= Joan Rivers filmography =

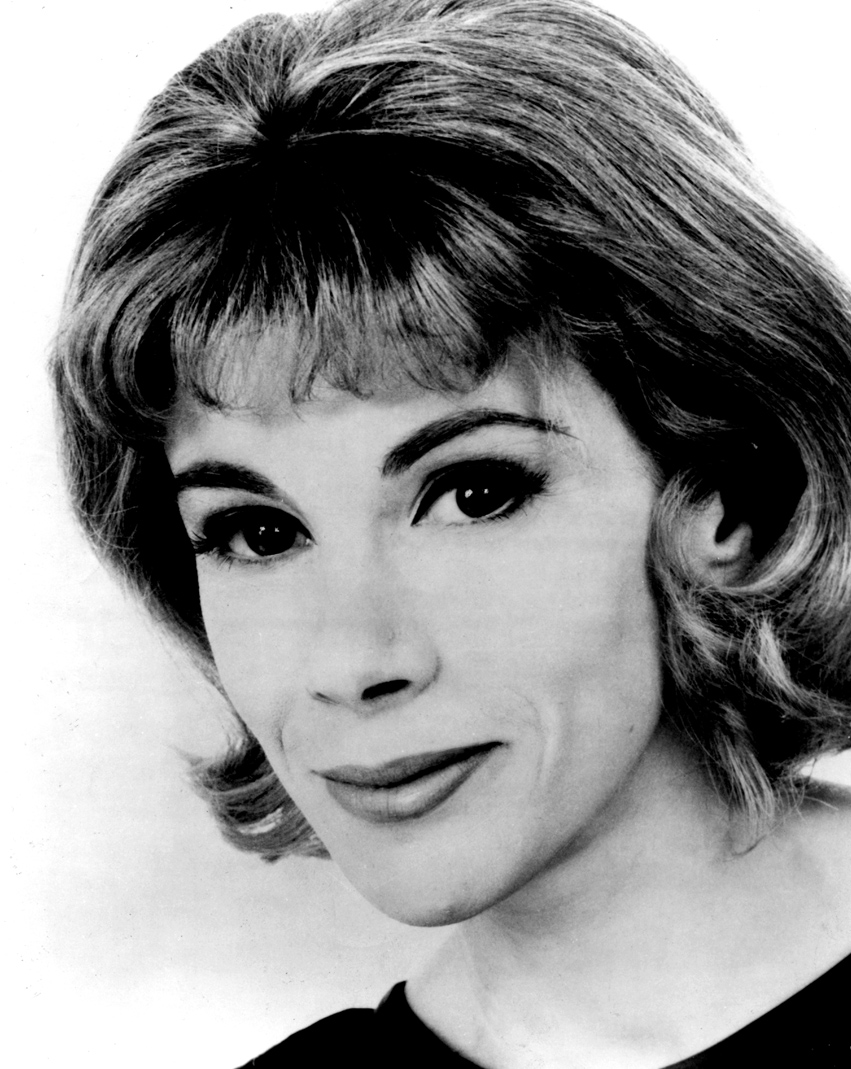
Rivers in 1967

The filmography of Joan Rivers includes over 25 feature films, numerous television and documentary series, seven filmed comedy specials, game shows, and other media. She began her career as a stand-up comedian, and had a years-long tenure as a host and regular guest on The Tonight Show with Johnny Carson from 1965 to 1986.

Rivers's first major film was Rabbit Test (1978), which she had a small part in and also co-wrote and directed. She would later supply the voice of Dot Matrix, the robot in Mel Brooks's Spaceballs (1986), and have a cameo as herself in John Waters's cult comedy-horror film Serial Mom (1994). In 1995, she provided a voice role in the Australian children's film Napoleon, and later appeared as herself in Shrek 2 (2004) and First Daughter (2004). From 2010 until her death in 2014, Rivers hosted the series Fashion Police, a panel series profiling and critiquing the red carpet attire of celebrities.

== Films ==
Year	Title	Role	Notes	Ref.
1951	Mister Universe	Teenage Girl in Audience	Cameo; uncredited	
1965	Hootenanny a Go-Go aka Once Upon a Coffee House	Herself	As folk singing trio "Jim, Jake and Joan"	
1968	The Swimmer	Joan	Cameo	
1978	Rabbit Test	Second nurse	Cameo, director and writer	
1981	Uncle Scam	Herself		
1984	The Muppets Take Manhattan	Perfume Saleswoman	Cameo	
1987	Les Patterson Saves the World	President Rivers	Uncredited	
1987	Spaceballs	Dot Matrix	Voice	|
1989	Look Who's Talking	Julie	Voice; credited under pseudonym of "Baby Guess"	
1990	How to Murder a Millionaire	Irma Summers		
1993	Public Enemy #2	Herself	Cameo	
1994	Serial Mom	Herself	Cameo	
1995	Napoleon	Mother Penguin	Voice	
1997	KnitWits	Becky	Voice	
1999	Goosed	Mom / Blanche		
2000	The Intern	Dolly Bellows		
2000	Whispers: An Elephant's Tale	Spike	Voice	
2002	Hip! Edgy! Quirky!	Floressa		
2004	Shrek 2	Herself	Voice	
2004	First Daughter	Herself	Cameo	
2009	The Hipsters	Floressa Malone		
2010	Wall Street: Money Never Sleeps	Herself	Cameo; uncredited	
2011	The Smurfs	Party Guest		
2011	Tower Heist	Herself	Uncredited	
2011	Growing Up Barnard	Herself	Short film	
2011	TMI with Joan Rivers	Herself	Funny or Die short	
2013	Iron Man 3	Herself	Cameo	
2014	Mostly Ghostly: Have You Met My Ghoulfriend?	Grandma Doyle	(Final film role)	

=== Documentaries ===
Year	Title	Director	Notes	Ref.
1990	The World of Jewish Humor	Rex Bloomstein	Television special	
1994	Stonewall 25: Voices of Pride and Protest	John Scagliotti	Documentary	
2002	The Making and Meaning of We Are Family	Danny Schechter	Television special	
2005	Spaceballs: The Documentary	Mel Brooks	Behind-the-scenes documentary	
2005	John Candy: Comic Spirit	Mel Brooks	Behind-the-scenes documentary	
2007	Making Trouble	Rachel Talbot	Documentary	
2007	Mr. Warmth: The Don Rickles Project	John Landis	Documentary special, HBO	
2008	Every Little Step	Adam Del Deo, James D. Stern	Television special	
2009	What's the Name of the Dame?	Allan Neuwirth	Documentary	
2010	Joan Rivers: A Piece of Work	Ricki Stern and Anne Sundberg	Documentary feature	
2013	Why We Laugh: Funny Women	Bernard Gourley	Documentary	
2013	Moms Mabley: I Got Somethin' to Tell You	Whoopi Goldberg	Documentary	
2013	Scatter My Ashes at Bergdorf's	Matthew Miele	Documentary	
2014	Women Aren't Funny	Bonnie McFarlane	Documentary	
2014	The Story of The Swimmer	Chris Innis	Behind-the-scenes documentary	
2014	Where the Sun Kisses the Ocean	Rainbeau Mars	Poetry.	
2016	Love, Sweat and Tears	Scott Jacobs	Documentary	
2016	Joan Rivers: Enter Laughing	Dan Karlock	Documentary	

== Television ==
=== Series ===
Year	Title	Role/Notes	Episodes
1973	Here's Lucy	Joan Reynolds (Juror)	Episode: "Lucy and Joan Rivers Do Jury Duty"
1973	Needles and Pins	Eleanor Karp	Episode: "The Wife You Save May Be Your Own"
1978	Husbands, Wives & Lovers	Creator/Writer	10 Eps.
1978	America 2-Night	Herself	Season 1 - Ep. 57
1983	The Love Boat	Allison Newman	Episode: "Gopher's Daisy/Our Son, the Lawyer/Salvaged Romance"
1987	The Dame Edna Experience	Herself	Season 1 - Ep. 2
1988	Offshore Television	Herself	1 Season, 1 Ep.
1990	227	Herself	Episode: "You Gotta Have Art"
1992	Roseanne	Claire	Episode: "This Old House"
1997	Another World	Meredith Dunston	Episode 8374
1997	Dr. Katz, Professional Therapist	Joan (voice) additional material writer	Episode: "Studio Guy"
1998–99	Suddenly Susan	Edie	2 episodes: "Oh, How They Danced", "Ben Rubenstein, Meet Joe Black"
2002	Curb Your Enthusiasm	Herself	Episode: "The Benadryl Brownie"
2004	I'm with Her	Herself	Season 1 - Eps. 15 and 16
2004	Dave the Barbarian	Zonthara - Empress of Evil (voice)	Season 1 - Eps. 3, 16 and 20
2004–05; 2010	Nip/Tuck	Herself	Season 2 - Ep. 16, Season 3 - Ep. 7 and Season 6 - Ep. 17
2005	Less than Perfect	Louise	Episode: "Pre-Wedded Bliss"
2006	Boston Legal	Herself	Episode: "Whose God Is It Anyway?"
2006-2007	Jakers! The Adventures of Piggley Winks	Shirley the Sheep (voice)	Season 3
2008–09	Z Rock	Herself - Aunt Joan (Dina's)	Season 1 - Eps. 1, 5, 8, 9 and 10; Season 2 - Ep. 20
2008–09	Spaceballs: The Animated Series	Dot Matrix (voice)	1 Season, 11 Eps.
2008-11	Arthur	Bubbe/Camel (voice)	Season 12 - Ep. 1 and Season 14 - Ep. 18
2011	Louie	Herself	Episode: "Joan"
2011	The Simpsons	Annie Dubinsky (voice)	Episode: "The Ten-Per-Cent Solution"
2012	Drop Dead Diva	Herself	Episode: "Rigged" and Ep. 9 "Ashes to Ashes"
2012	Hot in Cleveland	Anka	2 episodes: "Bye George, I Think He's Got It!", "Some Like It Hot"

=== Stand-up comedy series ===
Year	Title	Episodes/Role	Network
1984 2006	An Audience with...	Joan Rivers	ITV
2004	Just for Laughs	21 March 2004 / Performer	RTÉ
2004 2007	Jack Dee Live at the Apollo	Pilot / Featured Performer Season 3, Episode 5 / Guest Host	BBC One

=== Documentary series ===
Year	Title	Episode	Network
1993	Intimate Portrait	"Joan Rivers" (Available on VHS)	Lifetime
1993	Biography	"Vincent Price"	A&E
1997	Biography	"Fabulous World of Fabergé"	A&E
1998	Biography	"Roddy McDowall: Hollywood's Best Friend"	A&E
1999	The Hollywood Fashion Machine	"Hollywood Rocks"	American Movie Classics
1999	Heroes of Comedy	"Barry Humphries"	Channel 4
2000	Intimate Portrait	"Judy Collins"	Lifetime
2000	Biography	"Phyllis Diller"	A&E
2000	The Talk Show Story	2 Part Series	BBC
2000	E! Mysteries and Scandals	Hedy Lamarr	E!
2001	E! Mysteries and Scandals	Vincent Price	E!
2001	The Human Face	"Beauty"	BBC
2001	E! True Hollywood Story	Joan Rivers Parody aired April 1	E!
2002	Heroes of Black Comedy	"Whoopi Goldberg"	Channel 4/Comedy Central
2002	Heroes of Black Comedy	"Richard Pryor"	Channel 4/Comedy Central
2002	Hollywood Greats	"Burt Lancaster"	BBC
2002	E! News Live	"September 20th"	E!
2002	Biography	"Bio's 15 Sexiest"	A&E
2002	The South Bank Show	"Joan Rivers"	Bravo!/ITV
2003	E! True Hollywood Story	"Richard Pryor"	E!
2003	E! True Hollywood Story	"Hollywood Squares"	E!
2003	Heroes of Jewish Comedy	5 episodes	Channel 4/Comedy Central
2003	When I Was a Girl	"Singers"	We TV
2005	Favouritism	"Julian Clary's Showbiz Hissy Fits"	Channel 4
2006	Dawn French's Girls Who Do Comedy	3 Part Series / Full Interview	BBC
2006	The Story of Light Entertainment	3 episodes	BBC
2006	Dawn French's More Girls Who Do Comedy	1 episode	BBC
2007	E! True Hollywood Story	"Kathy Griffin"	E!
2012	E! True Hollywood Story	"Joan and Melissa Rivers"	E!

=== Television movies ===
Year	Title	Role	Notes	Ref.
1973	The Girl Most Likely To...	Writer of story/teleplay	ABC Movie of the Week starring Stockard Channing	
1977	Husbands and Wives	Writer	Spin-off TV series followed	
1985	Joan Rivers and Friends Salute Heidi Abromowitz	Host / Writer	Showtime sketch comedy	
1990	How to Murder a Millionaire	Irma	Starred with Morgan Fairchild	
1992	Lady Boss	Bibi Grant	Based on book by Jackie Collins	
1994	Tears and Laughter: The Joan and Melissa Rivers Story	Herself	Biographical teleplay about her and daughter Melissa Rivers	
1999	KnitWits Revisited	Becky (voice)	Animated	

=== Stand-up comedy specials ===
Year	Title	Role/Notes
1978	Bernard Manning in Las Vegas	Cameo (UK)
1981	Lily: Sold Out	Cameo (CBS)
1984	Johnny Carson Presents the Tonight Show Comedians	Performer (also featuring Bill Cosby, Steve Martin and Steven Wright)
1984	Garry Shandling: Alone in Vegas	Cameo (Showtime)
1990	Comic Relief IV	Performer (Comic Relief, Inc. HBO charity benefit)
1992	Joan Rivers: Abroad In London	Star–Writer–Producer (Showtime)
1994	The Annual Friars Club Tribute Presents a Salute to Barbara Walters	Roaster (Roast of the legend)
2002	Just for Laughs	Performer (stand-up festival doc with many comedians)
2006	Joan Rivers: Before Melissa Pulls the Plug	Star–Writer (with comic Jeremy Blaine and publicist Jordan Roberts)
2012	Joan Rivers: Don't Start With Me	Star–Writer–Producer (Showtime)

=== Documentaries ===
Year	Title	Notes	Network
2002	Cleavage	Narrated by Carmen Electra	A&E
2003	100 Greatest Sexy Moments	Narrated by Anna Chancellor	Channel 4
2003	The 100 Greatest Musicals	Presenter Denise van Outen	Channel 4
2004	Funny Already: A History of Jewish Comedy	Directed by Emma Cahusac	Channel 4
2004	CMT: 40 Greatest Done Me Wrong Songs	Writer	CMT
2004	Happy Birthday Oscar Wilde	Quote	BBC/RTÉ
2005	The Comedians' Comedian	Presenter Jimmy Carr	Channel 4
2005	Britain's 50 Greatest Comedy Sketches	Narrator Tom Baker	Channel 4
2005	50 Questions of Political Incorrectness	Presenter Clive Anderson	Sky UK
2006	The 50 Greatest Comedy Films	Narrator Stephen Fry	Channel 4
2006	The Electric Company's Greatest Hits & Bits	DVD 2007	PBS
2013	Whoopi Goldberg Presents Moms Mabley	Interviewee	HBO

=== Talk shows ===
Year	Title	Roles/Notes	Episodes
1965–86	The Tonight Show Starring Johnny Carson	Guest–Host–Writer	223
1965	The Jack Paar Program	Guest	1
1965–67	Girl Talk with Virginia Graham	Guest	5
1965–78	The Mike Douglas Show	Co-host–Guest	36
1968	Frost on Sunday	Guest	1
1968–69	That Show starring Joan Rivers	Host	71
1968–72	The Dick Cavett Show (ABC)	Guest	4
1969–72	The David Frost Show	Guest	3
1970	The Irv Kupcinet Show	Guest	1
1974	The Merv Griffin Show	Guest	1
1974–76	Dinah!	Guest	2
1978	The Bob Braun Show	Guest	1
1978	The Joe Franklin Show	Guest	1
1978, 1990	Donahue	Guest	2
1981–87	Hour Magazine	Guest	8
1982	The Regis Philbin Show	Guest	1
1982	The Barbara Walters Special	Guest	1
1984	Wogan	Guest	2
1985	America (CBS)	Guest	1
1986	Joan Rivers: Can We Talk?	Host	6
1986	Late Night with David Letterman	Guest	1
1986–87	The Late Show Starring Joan Rivers	Host–Writer (first season)	150
1987	Aspel & Company	Guest	1
1989	The Byron Allen Show	Guest (pilot episode)	1
1989	The Arsenio Hall Show	Guest	2
1989–91	CBS This Morning	Guest	3
1989–93	The Joan Rivers Show	Host–Writer	600
1990	Geraldo	Guest	1
1990–92	The Howard Stern Show (WWOR)	Guest	3
1991	The Full Wax	Guest	1
1991	Alan King: Inside the Comedy Mind	Guest	1
1991	The Dick Cavett Show (PBS)	Guest	1
1991	Tonight with Jonathan Ross	Guest	1
1993	The Howard Stern Interview	Guest	1
1994	Des O'Connor Tonight	Guest	1
1994–2004	Howard Stern	Guest	14
1995	Clive Anderson Talks Back	Guest	1
1995–2005	Late Night with Conan O'Brien	Guest	4
1995–2014	Can We Shop?	Host (QVC style shopping in a talk show format)	
1996	The Daily Show	Guest	1
1997	The Rosie O'Donnell Show	Guest	1
1997, 2010	Charlie Rose	Guest	2
1999	Linehan	Guest	1
1999	The Howard Stern Radio Show	Guest	1
2000	So Graham Norton	Guest	1
2002	V Graham Norton	Guest	2
2003	The Wayne Brady Show	Guest	1
2004	NY Graham Norton	Guest	1
2004	Film 2004 with Jonathan Ross	Guest	1
2004	Alf's Hit Talk Show	Cameo	Pilot
2004	The Graham Norton Effect	Guest	1
2004–06	The Joan Rivers Position	Host–Writer	18
2005	Nigella	Guest	1
2005	The Big Idea with Donny Deutsch	Guest	1
2005	Good Day Live	Guest	1
2005	The Late Late Show	Guest	1
2005	Distinguished Artists	Guest	1
2005	Friday Night with Jonathan Ross	Guest	1
2005	The Paul O'Grady Show	Guest	1
2005-06	The Tony Danza Show	Guest	3
2006	Tom Green Live!	Guest (voice)	1
2006	Straight Talk	Host–Writer (Bravo! pilot)	1
2008	Shrink Rap	Guest (with host Dr. Pamela Connolly)	1
2010–14	Fashion Police	Host	286
2013–14	In Bed with Joan	Host–Writer–Executive producer	72

=== Variety shows ===
Year	Title	Role	Episodes
1966	The Sammy Davis Jr. Show	Guest - Comedienne	1
1966	The Hollywood Palace	Guest - Comedienne	1
1966–70	The Ed Sullivan Show	Guest–Comedienne	18
1968	The Kraft Music Hall	Guest–Comedienne	3
1968	Operation: Entertainment	Guest–Comedienne	1
1970–75	The Carol Burnett Show	Guest–Comedienne	3
1971	The Jim Nabors Hour	Guest–Comedienne	1
1971	The Pearl Bailey Show	Guest–Comedienne	1
1971–73	The Flip Wilson Show	Guest–Comedienne	3
1972	Dean Martin Presents: The Bobby Darin Amusement Co.	Guest–Comedienne	1
1972–76	The Electric Company	Narrator (voice; The Adventures of Letterman segment)	60
1973	Stand Up and Cheer	Guest–Comedienne	1
1973	The Helen Reddy Show	Guest–Comedienne	1
1975	Sammy and Company	Guest–Comedienne	1
1978	The Jim Nabors Show	Guest–Comedienne	1
1978	The New Laugh-in	Guest–Comedienne	1
1979	Bonkers!	1	
1983	Saturday Night Live	Host–Writer	1
1983	On Stage America	Guest–Comedienne	1
1983	Live ... And in Person	Guest–Comedienne	1
1983–86	The Bob Monkhouse Show	Guest–Comedienne	2
1989–92	Sesame Street	Narrator (voice; The Adventures of Letterman segment)	3
1990–91	Shalom Sesame	Microphone (voice) Herself	"Chanukah" "The Aleph-Bet Telethon"
1991	Square One Television	Herself	1

=== Variety/Tribute specials ===
Year	Title	Role/Notes
1973	The Shape of Things	Variety special featuring Phyllis Diller, Brenda Vaccaro, Valerie Harper, Lynn Redgrave and directed by Lee Grant.
1977	Happy Birthday, Las Vegas	Variety special hosted by Don Meredith and Cindy Williams, featuring Rodney Dangerfield, Redd Foxx and David Brenner.
1978	ABC Presents Tomorrow's Stars	Talent contest hosted by John Ritter, featuring Charles Nelson Reilly, Norm Crosby and Dick Van Patten.
1978	Hollywood's Diamond Jubilee	Historical variety special hosted by Douglas Fairbanks Jr. and Raquel Welch, featuring Woody Allen, Fred Astaire, Marlon Brando and Bette Davis.
1979	The 3rd Annual People's Command Performance	Variety special featuring Chubby Checker, Lainie Kazan, Jerry Lewis, Vincent Price and Rod Stewart.
1980	Circus of the Stars #5	Circus-acts variety special featuring Lloyd Bridges, Angela Lansbury, Rock Hudson and Valerie Perrine.
1985	Moving Image Salutes Sidney Lumet	An honor celebrating the film director.
1986	George Burns' 90th Birthday Party: A Very Special Special	Celebration of the legendary comedian.
1986	WrestleMania 2	Second Pay-per-view WWF WrestleMania event.
1986	NBC 60th Anniversary Celebration	Unveiling of new peacock logo featuring Johnny Carson, Bob Hope, Sid Caesar, Ted Danson, The Monkees, Betty White and The Cosby Show kids.
1988	Pee-wee's Playhouse Christmas Special	Herself
1989	Macy's Thanksgiving Day Parade	Herself
1990	Happy Birthday, Bugs!: 50 Looney Years	Bugs Bunny celebration special.
1990	Night of 100 Stars III	Performer, charity benefit for the Actors Fund of America.
1992	Alistair Cooke Salute	A tribute hosted by Peter Ustinov, airing shortly after Cooke's last appearance as the 22-year host of "Masterpiece Theatre."
1995	The Beatles: All Together Now	Celebrities recall their earliest and fondest memories of the Beatles. Premiere of Free as a Bird music video to promote The Beatles Anthology.
1996	The Royal Variety Performance	Annual Royal Variety Charity benefit.
1996	Disney's Most Unlikely Heroes	Hosted by Roy E. Disney.
1997	50 Years of Television: A Celebration of the Academy of Television Arts & Sciences Golden Anniversary	Herself
2002	Stars: An Oscar's Party	Herself
2003	100 Years of Hope and Humor	Birthday celebration of the comedy legend.
2004	The Best of 'So Graham Norton'	DVD Special
2004	Bob Monkhouse: A BAFTA Tribute	Celebration of Britain's King of Comedy
2005	The Royal Wedding of HRH the Prince of Wales and Camilla Parker Bowles	Live broadcast coverage of the event
2014	Howard Stern Birthday Bash	SiriusXM Special

=== Award shows ===
Year	Title	Role/Notes
1976	The Second Annual Comedy Awards	Attendee
1983	The 35th Primetime Emmy Awards	Hostess & Presenter
1984	The 26th Annual Grammy Awards	Nominee – Best Comedy Album
1986	The 38th Primetime Emmy Awards	Presenter
1987	The 39th Primetime Emmy Awards	Presenter
1990	The 44th Tony Awards	Presenter: Best Scenic, Costume & Lighting Design
1990	The Horror Hall of Fame	Herself / Skit
1992	The 6th Annual American Comedy Awards	Nominee – Funniest Female Performer in a Television Special
1994	The 48th Tony Awards	Nominee – Best Performance by a Leading Actress in a Play
1995–2004	E! Live from the Red Carpet	Hostess
1998	The 50th Primetime Emmy Awards	Attendee
1999	The 51st Primetime Emmy Awards	Attendee
2005	Joan & Melissa: Live at the Golden Globes	Hostess for the TV Guide Channel Red carpet events
2005	Joan & Melissa: Live at the Grammys	Hostess for the TV Guide Channel Red carpet events
2005	Joan & Melissa: Live at the Academy Awards	Hostess for the TV Guide Channel Red carpet events
2005	Joan & Melissa: Live at the CMA Awards	Hostess for the TV Guide Channel Red carpet events
2006	Joan & Melissa: Live at the Academy Awards	Hostess for the TV Guide Channel Red carpet events
2006	Academy Awards Fashion Wrap with Joan and Melissa	Hostess for the TV Guide Channel Red carpet events
2006	Joan & Melissa: Live at the Emmys	Hostess for the TV Guide Channel Red carpet events
2006	Emmy Awards Fashion Wrap with Joan and Melissa	Hostess for the TV Guide Channel Red carpet events
2006	The 58th Primetime Emmy Awards	Attendee

=== Reality television shows ===
Year2013	Title project runway	Role
1960 1965	Candid Camera	Writer (4 episodes) Herself / "Bait"
1979	Celebrity Challenge of the Sexes 4	Bicycle racer
2003	I'm a Celebrity...Get Me Out of Here!	Herself
2005, 2007	Kathy Griffin: My Life on the D-List	Herself, 2 episodes
2008	Big Brother: Celebrity Hijack	Celebrity hijacker
2009	Celebrity Ghost Stories	Storyteller
2009	Celebrity Apprentice 2	Winner
2009–2010	How'd You Get So Rich?	Host (10 episodes)
2010	Celebrity Apprentice 3	Boardroom Advisor
2011–14	Joan & Melissa: Joan Knows Best?	Executive producer
2013	Celebrity Apprentice 6	Boardroom advisor
2015	Celebrity Apprentice 7	Boardroom advisor

=== Game shows ===
Year	Title	Host	Role	Episodes
1965–68	The Match Game	Gene Rayburn	Team Captain	25
1967–69	Personality	Larry Blyden	Contestant	6
1969	You're Putting Me On	Larry Blyden	Contestant	3
1970	The Movie Game	Larry Blyden	Contestant	1
1970	Concentration	Bob Clayton	Contestant	1
1970–80	The Hollywood Squares (Daytime version)	Peter Marshall	Panelist	80
1971	Can You Top This?	Wink Martindale	Contestant	1
1971–81	The Hollywood Squares (Syndicated version)	Peter Marshall	Panelist	Semi-regular
1973	The $10,000 Pyramid	Dick Clark	Celebrity contestant	1
1975	The Magnificent Marble Machine	Art James	Contestant	2
1987–89	The New Hollywood Squares	John Davidson	Center square	66
1997	Noel's House Party	Noel Edmonds	Celebrity contestant	Noel's New York House Party special
1999–2004	Hollywood Squares	Tom Bergeron	Panelist	65
2004	Ant & Dec's Saturday Night Takeaway	Ant & Dec	Celebrity guest	1
2006–07	8 Out of 10 Cats	Jimmy Carr	Contestant	3
2008	Celebrity Family Feud	Al Roker	Contestant	Ice-T vs. Joan & Melissa Rivers

== Home videos ==
=== Documentary ===
Year	Title	Studio	Formats
2010	Joan Rivers: A Piece of Work	IFC Independent Films	Theatrical, DVD, Blu-ray, Streaming

=== Stand-up comedy specials ===
Year	Title	Studio	Formats
1984	An Audience with Joan Rivers	Channel 4	Broadcast, DVD 2006
1992	Abroad In London	Showtime, Paramount Video	Broadcast, VHS 1995
2004	Live At the Apollo	BBC	Broadcast, Streaming
2005	(Still A) Live at the London Palladium (Allegedly)	Standing Room Only	DVD, Streaming
2006	Another Audience with Joan Rivers	ITV	Broadcast, DVD
2006	Before Melissa Pulls the Plug	Bravo!	Broadcast, Streaming
2012	Don't Start With Me	Showtime, Entertainment One	Broadcast, DVD/Blu-ray 2013, Streaming

=== Sketch/tribute specials ===
Year	Title	Studio	Formats
1985	Joan Rivers and Friends Salute Heidi Abromowitz	Showtime	Broadcast, VHS
1996	Shopping for Fitness	ABC Video	VHS
2009	Comedy Central Roast of Joan Rivers	Comedy Central	Broadcast, Streaming
2016	Joan Rivers - Exit Laughing	Gotham Comedy Club	Broadcast, Streaming

== Theater ==
Year	Show	Role/Credit	Venue
1965	The Game is Up	Material writer	Downstairs at the Upstairs, Off-Broadway
1972	Fun City	Jill Fairchild, original play written and performed	Morosco Theatre, Broadway
1988	Broadway Bound	Kate, replacement performer	Broadhurst Theatre, Broadway
1994	Sally Marr ... and her escorts	Sally Marr, original play written and performed	Helen Hayes Theatre, Broadway
2002–04	Joan Rivers: Broke and Alone Tour	Herself, original material written and performed	US and UK tour
2008	Joan Rivers: A Work in Progress by a Life in Progress	Herself, original material written and performed	Geffen Playhouse, Edinburgh Festival Fringe, Leicester Square Theatre
2012	Joan Rivers: The Now or Never Tour	Herself, original material written and performed	UK tour
