= Tony Tripoli =

American actor

Tony Tripoli (December 2, 1969) is an American actor, comedian and LGBT rights activist. He performs his stand-up comedy throughout the United States, and has produced, written and appeared on numerous TV series.

== Biography ==
Tripoli was born and raised in Phoenix, Arizona, where his parents owned a florist's shop. When he was young, his mother would take him to the launderette, where he would stand on the washing machines and sing for the customers there. He performed with The Phoenix Boys Choir for several years. After graduating from Central High School, he moved to Los Angeles, where he lived for 30 years. He went to the American Academy of Dramatic Arts in Los Angeles. He moved backed to Phoenix in 2017.

== Career ==
In 1987, he appeared in a local production of Neil Simon's play Brighton Beach Memoirs at The Phoenix Little Theatre. He has appeared on cruise ships, had a brief stint as a Chippendales stripper, was Aladdin at Disneyland, performed at the Laugh Factory, and once had a gig singing for the American Plumber's Association.

He was the co-executive producer and head writer of Fashion Police, with the late Joan Rivers. He was a producer and cast member on Joan & Melissa: Joan Knows Best?. He produced In Bed with Joan and What She Said, and was a staff writer on The Dish. He has appeared on television shows such as Kathy Griffin: My Life on the D-List, Fashion House and Two and a Half Men.

He has appeared on TV Guide's Funniest Commercials, TV Guides Hollywood's Sexiest Couples, Gossip Queens, Frank TV, Pretty Hurts, and E!'s 50 Super Epic TV Moments. He was also in the 2008 TV movie, Screening Party.

He performs his stand-up comedy throughout the United States and opened for Joan Rivers for 4 years. He discusses a number of topics in his standup ranging from sex and dating to his family and pop culture. After her death, he began touring in a tribute show called "The Bitch Is Back", featuring Joan Rivers impersonator Joe Posa.

== Personal life ==
He is openly gay, and his dog Bingham, frequently travels with him on tours.
