= Jewish-American comedy =

American-Jewish comedy is, in part, a continuation of the traditional role of humor in Jewish culture among historical and contemporary American performers. It has appealed to both Jewish and wider mainstream audiences. At various times in American history, the field of comedy has been dominated by Jewish comedians.

== History ==
The Borscht Belt arose in the early 20th century out of the tradition of Yiddish theater, in Jewish resort areas in the Catskill Mountains in New York. Many of the most famous Jewish comedians of the twentieth century launched their careers there. Many of the comedians gained a wider mainstream audience with the rise of Vaudeville.

Until recent years, most Jewish comedians adopted stage names that did not sound ethnic, as a way of gaining wider acceptance. Even among those who did not want to be considered Jewish comedians, their experiences as Jews were often included in their humor, including their moral sensibility.

== Themes and styles ==
Some common themes among American Jewish comedians include their heritage as Jews, experience of living between two worlds (ethnic and mainstream), anxiety of living as a minority in America and the foibles of American culture. Jewish comedy has often featured ridicule and insult jokes, including insulting other minority groups.

Characteristics of comedians include wit, verbal skills, self-mockery, and a "critical edge".

=== Women in Jewish-American humor ===
Whereas women had not been prominent in comedic roles in Europe, the changing roles of Jewish women in America allowed for the emergence of a class of female Jewish comedians, who have focused on their perspective as women, often adopting a feminist position.

== Representative examples ==
Following is a partial list of notable Americans for whom Jewishness is relevant to their role as comedians or humorists.

- Eric Andre
- Judd Apatow
- Roseanne Barr
- Todd Barry
- Belle Barth
- Jack Benny
- Gertrude Berg
- Milton Berle
- Shelley Berman
- Sandra Bernhard
- Lewis Black
- Alex Borstein
- David Brenner
- Fanny Brice
- Albert Brooks
- Mel Brooks
- Lenny Bruce
- George Burns
- Eddie Cantor
- Sid Caesar
- Emil Cohen
- Myron Cohen
- David Cross
- Billy Crystal
- Rodney Dangerfield
- Larry David
- Fran Drescher
- Susie Essman
- Wayne Federman
- Totie Fields
- David Frye
- Brad Garrett
- Ilana Glazer
- Judy Gold
- Gilbert Gottfried
- Gary Gulman
- Buddy Hackett
- Tiffany Haddish
- Goldie Hawn
- Jackie Hoffman
- Judy Holliday
- Abbi Jacobson
- George Jessel
- Jay Jason
- Al Jolson
- Madeline Kahn
- Andy Kaufman
- Danny Kaye
- Robert Klein
- Harvey Korman
- Nick Kroll
- Lisa Kron
- Tom Lehrer
- Wendy Liebman
- Jerry Lewis
- Richard Lewis
- Marc Maron
- Groucho Marx and the Marx Brothers
- Jackie Mason
- Elaine May
- Bette Midler
- Mike Nichols
- Molly Picon
- Rain Pryor
- Gilda Radner
- Carl Reiner
- Paul Reubens (Pee-wee Herman)
- Don Rickles
- Joan Rivers
- Seth Rogen
- Rita Rudner
- Mort Sahl
- Andy Samberg
- Adam Sandler
- Amy Schumer
- Jerry Seinfeld
- William Shatner
- Allan Sherman
- Monroe Silver
- Sarah Silverman
- Phil Silvers
- Jenny Slate
- David Steinberg
- Howard Stern
- Jon Stewart
- Ben Stiller
- The Three Stooges
- Sophie Tucker
- Gene Wilder
- Henny Youngman
