= Edgar Rosenberg =

German-born television producer (1925–1987)

- Born: September 21, 1925; Bremerhaven, Germany
- Died: August 14, 1987 (aged 61); Philadelphia, Pennsylvania, U.S.
- Education: Cambridge University
- Occupations: Film producer; television producer
- Years active: 1964–1987
- Spouse: Joan Rivers (m. 1965)
- Children: Melissa Rivers

Edgar Rosenberg (September 21, 1925 – August 14, 1987) was a German-born British film and television producer based in the United States.

== Early life ==
Edgar Rosenberg was born to German-Jewish parents in Bremerhaven in 1925. When he was a small boy, his family emigrated from Germany to Denmark and then South Africa to escape the Nazis. He was educated in England at Rugby School and Cambridge University.

== Career ==
Rosenberg moved to the United States as a young man and rose to become an assistant to Emanuel Sacks, vice president of entertainment at NBC. He was fired during a year of recovery after, sitting in a parked car, he had been hit by a runaway truck: he had to work as a night clerk in a bookstore. In the 1960s, he worked for the public relations firm run by Anna M. Rosenberg (to whom he was not related) and was a valued news source for journalists.

As a co-founder of the nonprofit Telsun Foundation production company affiliated with the United Nations, he helped to develop a series of television films promoting the United Nations, one of which, The Poppy Is Also a Flower (1966), was also released to theaters as a feature film. His other television credits included the 1950s U.S. educational TV series Omnibus and the short-lived 1970s sitcom Husbands, Wives & Lovers, which was created by his wife, Joan Rivers.

In the 1970s, he produced the feature film Rabbit Test (1978), written and directed by Rivers. He served as Rivers' manager for most of their marriage and was a producer on The Late Show Starring Joan Rivers, on the newly formed Fox Television Network.

== Personal life and death ==
Rosenberg married actress, comedian and commentator Joan Rivers in July 1965, five days after hiring her to work with him in Jamaica rewriting a screenplay for a joint movie deal with his friend Peter Sellers. The couple had one daughter, Melissa Rivers.

In August 1987, several months after Fox fired him and Rivers, Rosenberg took his own life, overdosing on prescription drugs in a Philadelphia hotel room. He had been clinically depressed, which Rivers believed was brought on by medication he had been taking since a heart attack in 1984. Nancy Reagan was the first person to telephone Rivers upon Rosenberg's death and arranged for his body to be moved from Philadelphia.
