= Sally Marr =

American comedian (1906–1997)

Sally Marr (December 30, 1906 – December 14, 1997) was an American stand-up comic, dancer and actress who is best known as being the mother of comic Lenny Bruce, whose act she influenced.

== Life and career ==
Born Sadie Kitchenberg in Jamaica, Queens, New York, Marr married Bruce's father, the British-born Myron (Mickey) Schneider, who was a shoe clerk, when she was 17 years old. Lenny was born on October 13, 1925. She divorced Schneider when her son Leonard was either five or eight years old.

Marr started out in show business as a dancer, necessitating that Lenny had to be brought up by relatives when he was young. Eventually, Lenny moved back in with her, and she supported them as a single-mother working as a maid and a waitress. She developed a night-club act based on impersonating movie stars and became a stand-up comic. After World War II, her son Lenny launched his own career in stand-up comedy, imitating his mother and then developing his own routines, many of which dealt with his life with his mother.

Marr said in an interview in 1989 "People are always saying that everything in comedy stems from Lenny -- that everything touches him. What can I tell you? He took after me!" In addition to her work as a comic and an actress, Marr served as a talent spotter. She discovered Tommy Chong, Cheech Marin, Pat Morita, and Sam Kinison. Marr died on December 14, 1997, in Los Angeles.

== Career ==
Marr started her career in comedy by doing stand-up and impressions of famous movie stars such as James Cagney and Humphrey Bogart.Showbiz was Marr's true calling. She started out as a dancer and outright performer. Much like her son, Lenny, comedy was her strong suit. Marr often worked in clubs as performer and emcee where she was able to meet many other up and coming comedians and performers of the time. In describing her own act, Marr said she was a "clown," she stayed away from profanity and was over the top in her comedy, often going on stage 'naked' or without written material.

Though Marr never officially signed anybody, she was still credited with finding numerous comedians. When interviewed about it, Marr stated " If you sign with someone what's the first thing you think about? 'I bet you I could've done better.' But if you get it for nothing, what could be better than nothing? . . . I would never give up my freedom, if I sign something it's a commitment."

After moving to Los Angeles later in her career, she stayed in the show biz industry, while also running a strip tease academy. Marr appeared in the 1974 film Harry and Tonto.

== Legacy ==
Joan Rivers, who was influenced by the comedy of Lenny Bruce, co-wrote and starred in the play Sally Marr...and Her Escorts, a play "suggested by the life of Sally Marr" and featuring the "Voice of Young Lenny". After 27 previews, the play ran on Broadway for 50 performances in May and June 1994. Rivers was nominated for a Drama Desk Award as Outstanding Actress in a Play and a Tony Award for Best Actress in a Play for playing Sally Marr.

Marr's impact on comedy is undoubtedly because of the comedians she discovered and of course her impact on her son, Lenny Bruce. She is credited with being his main comedic inspiration, as well as the one who initially gave Bruce material and convinced him to go into comedy.
