= How to Murder a Millionaire =

- Genre: Comedy
- Written by: Joan Rivers
- Directed by: Paul Schneider
- Starring: Joan Rivers
- Composer: Richard Gibbs
- Country of origin: United States
- Original language: English

Production
- Cinematography: James Pergola
- Editor: Robert Florio
- Running time: 100 minutes

Original release
- Network: ABC
- Release: January 7, 1990

How to Murder a Millionaire is a 1990 American made-for-television comedy film directed by Paul Schneider and written by and starring Joan Rivers. The film aired on ABC on January 7, 1990.

== Plot ==
Irma Summers is a wealthy Beverly Hills housewife who enjoys a luxurious lifestyle and frequent shopping trips, but her marriage to her husband Walter has become strained. She often confides in her friend Loretta about her dissatisfaction with their relationship. During an anniversary dinner with Loretta and Gilbert, Irma and Walter’s constant complaints about each other make it clear that their marriage is in trouble

Soon afterward, Irma begins experiencing a series of frightening incidents that make her question whether someone is trying to kill her. While driving home one day, her car’s brakes fail, causing her to crash through the garage door. The next night, she hears what she believes is a prowler outside and calls the police. While investigating the noise, she becomes trapped in the garage with smoke coming from a car. When the police arrive and see Walter outside, they dismiss the incident as a false alarm, leaving Irma even more unsettled.

Walter later surprises Irma with a new electric back massager in the bathtub. In elation, she accidentally drops a brush into the water and sparks fly, rendering her more suspicious. Irma’s suspicions intensify when she sees Walter at a restaurant with another woman. Walter places a necklace around the woman’s neck, and Irma assumes he is having an affair. Later, her mechanic informs her that someone had deliberately drained the brake fluid from her car, confirming that the crash was sabotage rather than an accident. With the failed brakes, the bathtub incident, and Walter’s apparent romantic involvement with another woman, Irma becomes convinced that her husband is plotting to kill her for her fortune.

When Irma sees Walter hide a box in a drawer, she discovers a gun inside and believes she has found proof of his actual intentions. She calls the police but to no avail, then leaves home with some clothing and valuables to escape.

Meanwhile, Danny and Teresa, a couple who believe stealing from the wealthy is acceptable, attempt to rob Loretta and Gilbert’s house, Irma sees Teresa there,(unconcerned by her presence since Teresa is a maid at the house) and confides in her about Walter’s alleged attempts to murder her, revealing that she is worth $3 million. Seeing an opportunity, Teresa takes Irma with her, but Danny suggests that they kill Irma themselves for her money. Teresa refuses; Irma, who overhears the argument, sneaks up behind Danny, and knocks him unconscious with a statue.

Walter goes to Gilbert’s office, where the woman Irma saw him with at the restaurant thanks him for the necklace he purchased for her. It is revealed that she is Walter’s secretary and that the necklace was a wedding gift for her, as she is about to be married. It is also revealed that Walter bought the gun for Irma for protection. Walter eventually learns that Irma has used her credit card and follows the trail to find her.

As Irma continues trying to protect herself whilst taking residence in a flea motel, she joins the maid service so she can return to her own home and secretly recover her jewelry. During this time, Teresa helps her retrieve her belongings. Back at the house, Loretta attempts to seduce Walter, but he rejects her advances.

Meanwhile, Irma's mechanic calls and tells Walter about the tampering of the brake fluids. Frantic, he leaves the house just as Gilbert secretly enters the residence and steal the gun out from the drawer. Upon hearing a voicemail from Danny and mention of a flight that Irma has booked (though it was actually Teresa, who intended to leave the country with Teresa's jewelry), Gilbert calls Danny and pretends to be Walter, convincing Danny to kill Irma for $50,000. Danny later finds Irma (who is searching for Teresa upon learning about the flight reservation and the missing jewelry) at the airport and tells her that Walter hired him to kill her. Realizing she is still in danger, Irma offers Danny $100,000 to spare her life. Leaving the airport, she then finds Teresa back at the motel with the jewelry still intact. Teresa admits that she could not go through with leaving, realizing that there was more to consider than simply taking money. The two reconcile, and Irma accepts that she must eventually confront Walter. However, she soon realizes with horror that Danny may be planning to kill Walter instead. She contacts her maid service and learns that a wedding is taking place at the Ambassador Hotel, where she goes and hides beneath the wedding cake.

At the hotel, Walter tells Gilbert that someone is actually trying to kill Irma. When Gilbert reveals that he has the gun, Walter realizes that Gilbert has been behind the scheme all along. Danny then arrives and tells Walter that Irma hired him to kill him and is willing to settle for more money to spare Walter and kill Irma instead. Walter is confused and insists that he never offered Danny any money and that he would never want his wife dead. Irma overhears this and is relieved and delighted to realize that Walter truly was not trying to murder her. A struggle follows, and Gilbert is subdued and arrested. It is revealed that Gilbert planned to have Irma killed and frame Walter for the crime so that he could take control of the company. With the truth finally exposed, Irma and Walter reconcile, and everyone celebrates together.

== Cast ==
- Joan Rivers as Irma Summers
- Alex Rocco as Walter Summers
- Morgan Fairchild as Loretta
- David Ogden Stiers as Gilbert
- Meshach Taylor as Danny
- Telma Hopkins as Teresa

== Production ==
The film was produced by Joan Rivers and Mace Neufeld. It was one of Rivers' early ventures into both writing and producing for television. The film's score was composed by Micky Erbe and Maribeth Solomon.

== Reception ==
While the film featured a strong cast, including Joan Rivers and Morgan Fairchild, it received poor reviews and was described as "[n]ot half as funny as it sets out to be" and "a one-joke wonder".
