= Rabbit Test (film) =

1978 film by Joan Rivers

- Theatrical release poster
- Directed by: Joan Rivers
- Written by: Joan Rivers; Jay Redack
- Produced by: Edgar Rosenberg
- Starring: Billy Crystal; Roddy McDowall; Joan Prather; Alex Rocco; Doris Roberts; Michael Keaton
- Cinematography: Lucien Ballard
- Edited by: Stanford C. Allen
- Music by: Pete Carpenter; Mike Post
- Production companies: Laugh or Die; Melvin Simon Productions
- Distributed by: AVCO Embassy Pictures
- Release date: April 9, 1978
- Running time: 84 minutes
- Country: United States
- Language: English
- Budget: $997,000
- Box office: $4.7 million

Rabbit Test is a 1978 American comedy film about the world's first pregnant man, directed and co-written by Joan Rivers and starring Billy Crystal in his film debut.

This was the only directing effort by Joan Rivers, who also plays a nurse in a brief scene, while her daughter Melissa Rivers also has a bit part. Rivers' husband, Edgar Rosenberg, was producer. It was the only theatrical feature to be scored by the team of Mike Post and Pete Carpenter. Michael Keaton made his feature-film debut in a small, nonspeaking role.

The title is a reference to the Friedman test, commonly known as the rabbit test, a medical procedure used for several decades in the 20th century to determine pregnancy.

== Plot ==
Lionel Carpenter (Billy Crystal) is a night-school teacher who has bad luck with women. He remains a virgin until his brash cousin Danny (Alex Rocco) sets him up with a one-night stand. Soon after, Lionel starts feeling nauseated and vomits, eventually doing so onto Segoynia Savaka (Joan Prather), one of his immigrant students. This turns out to be a blessing in disguise, as it gives him an excuse to ask her out on a date, and a romance develops.

When Lionel meets Segoynia's fortune-telling grandmother (played by Roddy McDowall in drag), she intuits that he is the world's first pregnant man. This results in a series of gags relating to his pregnancy and people's reactions to it. One side plot has Lionel being pursued by the Army because the President of the United States is afraid of what effect the widespread ability of men to conceive will have on population growth.

In the ending sequence, which is patterned after the Nativity, Lionel finally goes into labor. The camera rises to Heaven, where God announces to the viewers the successful delivery: "Oh my god... It's a girl!"

== Cast ==
The main cast includes:

- Billy Crystal as Lionel
- Joan Prather as Segoynia
- Alex Rocco as Danny
- Doris Roberts as Mrs. Carpenter
- Margaret Adachi as Interviewer
- Adam Anderson as Sobbing Sailor
- John Andersonio as African Chief
- Edward Ansara as Second Newscaster
- Billy Barty as Lester
- Imogene Coca as Madam Marie
- Richard Deacon as First Newscaster
- Norman Fell as Segoynia's Father
- Fannie Flagg as President's Wife
- Alice Ghostley as Nurse Tumm
- Roosevelt Grier as Taxi Driver
- George Gobel as President of the U.S.
- Paul Lynde as Dr. Roger Vidal, M.D.
- Roddy McDowall as Gypsy Grandmother/Dr. D & C Fishbine
- Sheree North as Mystery Lady
- Charles Pierce as Queen of the United Kingdom
- Tom Poston as Minister
- Charlotte Rae as Cousin Claire
- Jimmie Walker as Umbuto
- Michael Keaton as Sailor
- Joan Rivers as Second Nurse
- Ron Rifkin as Dr. Briscoe

== Production ==
When all the major studios turned Rivers down for funding, she raised about half the film's $997,000 budget by remortgaging her home and convincing her father to do the same, and raised the other half with a series of investment deals. Rivers explained how she got so many cameos on a tiny budget: "We had no money to spare. I made up a letter: 'Dear so-and-so, we'd love to have you be in a part; there is no money, no point in arguing, etc.'" All involved did stints for scale ($185), with a bonus if the film made over $18 million. Another $1 million were allotted for promotion and publicity.

== Release ==
The film opened in prerelease on February 17, 1978, in six cities (Nashville, Rochester, Columbus, Houston, Denver, and Portland) before an official opening in Los Angeles on April 7.

== Reception ==
Rabbit Test drew negative reviews from the majority of critics.

- Roger Ebert rated the film 1 star out of 4 and wrote that it "is not a funny movie. It really isn't. It's jammed from wall to wall with eccentric characters and throwaway one-liners and would-be funny signs (The Christian Science Memorial Hospital), but it's just not funny. And I know it's not, because I would have laughed if it had been."
- Gene Siskel of the Chicago Tribune gave the film 1.5 stars out of 4 and called it a "trivial and tasteless little movie ... It's nothing more than a series of tired ethnic insults and vulgar sex jokes."
- Janet Maslin of The New York Times wrote, "Miss Rivers has turned to directing without paying much heed to whether a whole movie constructed from one-liners is worth even the sum of its parts. In her case, it's not—and the one-liners weren't all that sparkling to begin with. When it winds up on television, which is where a movie this visually crude belonged in the first place, Rabbit Test may improve slightly: Constant commercial interruptions may help distract attention from the movie's continuity problems, which are severe. And the coarseness of its comedy may not seem so insufferable to an audience willing to sit still for Laverne and Shirley."
- Variety stated, "Rivers has taken a slim concept ... and come up with a generally slim feature. To be sure, it contains a few yocks, but the humor—from one liner to one liner—never emerges; it's 84 minutes of forced setups."
- Kevin Thomas of the Los Angeles Times wrote, "Ostensibly, this film, sure to be among the year's worst, is a comedy, but it's really a mystery, the mystery being how a lady as witty and talented as Miss Rivers, who showed such flair with her script for the TV movie The Girl Most Likely To..., could come up with something so crass and unfunny."
- Gary Arnold of The Washington Post called the film a "tiresome farce" full of jokes "which fall flat with dreadful consistency."

Joan Rivers heavily promoted the film by visiting theaters in Chicago showing the film. When she visited the Portage Theater on Chicago's northwest side, she arrived in a limo, told jokes, signed autographs, took photos with fans, and received a standing ovation from theater patrons during her visit.

The film received a 1.7/10 by the judges at its 2018 screening at The Secret Cinema, surpassing Wild Rovers (2.3/10) to become the lowest-rated film to be shown there.

Despite the negative reviews the film received, Rabbit Test was a box-office hit, grossing over $12 million in its first four months of release.
