= In Bed with Joan =

American weekly TV and streaming talk show (2013–2014)

- Genre: Talk show
- Starring: Joan Rivers
- Country of origin: United States
- Original language: English
- No. of episodes: 72

Production
- Executive producers: Joan Rivers; Melissa Rivers; Scott Sternberg
- Production location: Malibu, California
- Running time: 13 to 28 minutes
- Production company: Scott Sternberg Productions

Original release
- Network: iTunes; YouTube
- Release: March 5, 2013 – August 27, 2014

Related
- Joan & Melissa: Joan Knows Best?; Fashion Police

In Bed with Joan was an American weekly internet and television talk show hosted by Joan Rivers from her bed in her daughter Melissa's house near Malibu, California. Each week, Rivers invited a different guest to talk to her in bed about different things including their past, their love life and their career. Episodes were approximately 20 minutes, and were aired on iTunes and YouTube until her death.

== Premise ==
Each week, Rivers invited a different celebrity to her bed to talk with her about many things including their past, their love life and their career. Each episode started with the celebrity guest talking personally to the camera about what they expect the experience to be like, before the opening credits were then rolled. Rivers then started by saying, "Let's see who's coming out of the closet this week..." and then the guest emerged from the closet in the corner of the room. After casual conversation for the majority of the interview, they then focused on specific segments. Those were usually, 'I'm So Sorry' where the guest was given the opportunity to look into the camera and apologise to anyone they had offended or upset in the past. The next item was the opposite, called 'Sit on It and Rotate' where the celebrity insulted and really gave a piece of their mind to the people who'd been nasty and cruel to them in the past. The third and final segment was called 'Dead or Alive' where Melissa came in with flashcards with a different thing on each and the guest had to choose which one to kill and which one to keep alive (often this was between two different celebrities). The guest then finished the show by clapping the lights out.

The show was set in Rivers's room in the basement of her daughter's house in Malibu, California where she spent half her time living; the other half she spent at her apartment in New York.

Sarah Silverman was the first guest. Other guests on the show include Kelly Osbourne, Betsy Brandt, RuPaul and Howie Mandel.

== Rivers' death ==
After Rivers suffered cardiac arrest on August 28, 2014 and was put into a medically induced coma, the series was put on hiatus with unaired episodes still to be broadcast. She died on September 4, 2014, leaving the episodes unaired.

== Episodes ==
Episode	Original air date	Guest	Ref.
1	March 5, 2013	Sarah Silverman	
2	March 12, 2013	Nick Kroll	
3	March 19, 2013	Kelly Osbourne	
4	March 26, 2013	Belinda Carlisle	
5	April 2, 2013	Adam Pally	
6	April 9, 2013	Margaret Cho	
7	April 16, 2013	Anthony Jeselnik	
8	April 23, 2013	RuPaul	
9	April 30, 2013	Ed Weeks	
10	May 7, 2013	Gary Busey	
11	May 14, 2013	Kate Flannery	
12	May 21, 2013	Tichina Arnold	
13	May 28, 2013	Ellie Kemper	
14	June 4, 2013	Marc Maron	
15	June 18, 2013	Gabriel Iglesias	
16	June 26, 2013	Tom Green	
17	July 3, 2013	Redfoo	
18	July 9, 2013	Aisha Tyler	
19	July 16, 2013	Penn Jillette	
20	July 23, 2013	Jim Rash	
21	August 3, 2013	Howie Mandel	
22	August 6, 2013	Bill Engvall	
23	August 13, 2013	Alyssa Milano	
24	August 20, 2013	Betsy Brandt	
25	August 28, 2013	Theo Von	
26	September 4, 2013	Lance Bass	
27	September 10, 2013	Kevin Nealon	
28	September 17, 2013	Carmen Electra	
29	September 24, 2013	Jeff Garlin	
30	October 2, 2013	Jessie James and Eric Decker	
31	October 8, 2013	Tabatha Coffey	
32	October 15, 2013	Russell Peters	
33	October 22, 2013	Eric Andre	
34	October 29, 2013	Deon Cole	
35	November 5, 2013	Kris Jenner	
36	November 13, 2013	Rob Delaney	
37	November 19, 2013	Dan Bucatinsky	
38	December 3, 2013	Paul Scheer	
39	December 10, 2013	Billy Eichner	
40	December 17, 2013	Jen Kirkman	
41	January 15, 2014	Shiri Appleby	
42	January 21, 2014	Justine Ezarik	
43	January 28, 2014	Reza Farahan	
44	February 4, 2014	Loni Love	
45	February 11, 2014	Bonnie McKee	
46	February 19, 2014	Paul Rodriguez	
47	February 25, 2014	George Kotsiopoulos	
48 (Part 1)	March 4, 2014	Kathy Griffin	
48 (Part 2)	March 11, 2014	Kathy Griffin and Aubrey Plaza	
49	March 19, 2014	Jeff Ross	
50	March 26, 2014	Chris Hardwick	
51	April 2, 2014	Michaela Watkins	
52	April 9, 2014	Bob Saget	
53	April 16, 2014	Patti Stanger	
54	April 22, 2014	Jenna Marbles	
55	April 29, 2014	Lennon Parham and Jessica St. Clair	
56	May 7, 2014	Bart Baker and KingBach	
57	May 14, 2014	Greg Fitzsimmons	
58	May 21, 2014	Mamrie Hart	
59	May 28, 2014	Tom Papa	
60	June 4, 2014	Hannah Hart	
61	June 11, 2014	Jason Biggs	
62	June 18, 2014	Meghan McCain	
63	June 25, 2014	T. J. Miller	
64	July 2, 2014	Derek Waters	
65	July 9, 2014	Scott Aukerman	
66	July 16, 2014	Brett Gelman	
67	July 23, 2014	Grace Helbig	
68	July 30, 2014	Brittany Furlan	
69	August 6, 2014	Candace Cameron Bure	
70	August 13, 2014	Tyler Oakley	
71	August 20, 2014	Bianca Del Rio	
72	August 27, 2014	LeAnn Rimes and Eddie Cibrian	
