= The Late Show (1986 talk show) =

American talk show (1986–1988)

- Also known as: The Late Show Starring Joan Rivers (1986–1987); The Late Show Starring Ross Shafer (1988)
- Genre: Late-night talk show
- Starring: Joan Rivers (October 9, 1986 – May 15, 1987); Various guest hosts (May 18 – September 17, 1987); Arsenio Hall (September 18 – November 27, 1987); Various guest hosts (March 10 – April 14, 1988); Ross Shafer (April 15 – October 14, 1988)
- Announcer: Clint Holmes (1986–1987); Daniel Rosen (1988)
- Music by: Mark Hudson and the Party Boys/Late Show Band (1986–1987); Jack Mack and the Heart Attack (1988)
- Composer: Jay Richard Kennedy
- Country of origin: United States
- No. of seasons: 2

Production
- Executive producers: Edgar Rosenberg (1986–1987); Howard Bolter (1987–1988); Ron Vandor (1988)
- Producers: Bruce McKay; John Scura; Nora Fraser; Thomas Juvik
- Production locations: Fox Television Center, Los Angeles, California
- Camera setup: Multi-camera
- Running time: 45–48 minutes
- Production companies: Fox Square Productions; 20th Century Fox Television

Original release
- Network: Fox
- Release: October 9, 1986 – November 27, 1987
- Release: March 10 – October 14, 1988

Related
- The Wilton North Report; The Joan Rivers Show; The Arsenio Hall Show

The Late Show is an American late-night talk show that aired on the Fox network from October 9, 1986, to October 28, 1988. It was Fox's first regularly scheduled network program and was originally titled The Late Show Starring Joan Rivers, with comedian Joan Rivers as host.

The program was launched as a competitor to NBC's The Tonight Show Starring Johnny Carson, where Rivers had been the permanent guest host. After Rivers was fired in May 1987, the show continued with a series of guest hosts. Arsenio Hall subsequently hosted the program for 13 weeks, receiving his first sustained exposure as a late-night talk-show host.

Fox replaced the program in December 1987 with The Wilton North Report, but revived The Late Show in March 1988 after the replacement was quickly canceled. After another period of guest hosts, Seattle television personality Ross Shafer became the regular host. The series ended in October 1988.

== Background and launch ==
In May 1986, the newly formed Fox Broadcasting Company announced that Joan Rivers would host a late-night talk show as the first step in establishing a fourth commercial television network. Rivers had been the permanent guest host of NBC's The Tonight Show Starring Johnny Carson and had frequently been mentioned as a possible successor to Carson.

Fox positioned The Late Show Starring Joan Rivers as the cornerstone of its new network. The program was produced at the Fox Television Center in Hollywood, the former Metromedia Square, and was scheduled for Monday through Friday. Fox initially planned an 11 p.m. Eastern start, placing Rivers partly opposite Carson, whose program began at 11:30.

Rivers accepted the Fox offer after becoming dissatisfied with her position at NBC. She later wrote that NBC had declined to give her assurances about her future as Carson's permanent guest host and that she had become concerned that she was no longer being considered as a possible successor.

Rivers's move caused a highly publicized break with Carson, who learned of the deal shortly before Fox announced it. Rivers maintained that her dispute had been with NBC rather than Carson and that she had withheld the news because she feared the Fox agreement could collapse if negotiations became public.

The program premiered on October 9, 1986, on Fox's owned stations and approximately 80 affiliates. It marked Fox's entry into regularly scheduled network programming and preceded the network's launch of a prime-time schedule in April 1987.

=== Rivers and Carson ===
Fox was looking for a host for a late-night talk show for the network's launch in October 1986. Through its purchase of Metromedia, it had been airing The Merv Griffin Show (a syndication stalwart for two decades) but opted to drop that program (leading to its cancellation) to make room for its own show. The new network offered Rivers the job at a salary higher than what NBC was paying. She accepted and Carson was blindsided by the news when he saw the May 8, 1986, press conference on television. Moments later, when Rivers called him at home, he refused to take the call.

Carson was furious when he found out about Rivers going to Fox. Carson stated that he felt betrayed by Rivers – not because she dared to compete with him, but because she was not honest with him beforehand about her intentions and did not ask him for advice and his blessing. For her part, Rivers was adamant that her problem was with NBC and not with Carson, who was like a father figure to her. She stated that she didn't want to tell Carson before the announcement was made because she was afraid Fox would cancel the deal if word leaked out. She had previously been ordered by Carson's producers and lawyers not to go to him with her problems, as they kept Carson completely insulated since he was a major source of NBC profits; thus Carson had been completely unaware of Rivers' problems with NBC.

When other performers launched competing shows (such as David Brenner, Alan Thicke, Joey Bishop, and Pat Sajak), Carson always had them on The Tonight Show beforehand to wish them luck – and again after he had forced their show into cancellation by maintaining superior ratings. Rivers did not appear on the Tonight Show again during the remainder of Carson's tenure after 1986 or during that of his successors (in this case, Jay Leno and subsequently, Conan O'Brien) until February 17, 2014, when she appeared in a cameo on The Tonight Show Starring Jimmy Fallon's first show, by which point Carson had been dead for nine years.

Rivers spoke highly of Carson on the night he died (January 23, 2005), but revealed that he never spoke to her again.

=== Joan Rivers as host ===
The Late Show Starring Joan Rivers combined Rivers's opening monologue with celebrity interviews, comedy and musical performances. Clint Holmes served as announcer, while Mark Hudson led the house band. Rivers's husband, Edgar Rosenberg, was an executive producer of the program.

The show initially attracted considerable publicity, but after a moderate start ratings soon sagged during its first season and remained well behind The Tonight Show Starring Johnny Carson. The difficulties were compounded by Fox's still-developing network of affiliates; unlike NBC, Fox did not yet have nationwide coverage for its late-night programming. The ratings struggles also made it hard for Fox to attract affiliates for its primetime launch on April 5, 1987. Some prospective affiliates, such as Milwaukee's WCGV-TV, would only sign with the network if they did not have to carry The Late Show. KPTM in Omaha refused outright out of loyalty to Carson, who hailed from Corning, Iowa, east of Omaha and started his career on local radio and television. The network acquiesced to allow some stations out of that obligation so that it could launch in primetime with as many affiliates as possible, at the cost of ratings and access to The Late Show. For instance, at the time the show launched Fox had not closed on its purchase of its Boston station, WXNE-TV (later WFXT). That station's previous owners, the Christian Broadcasting Network, objected to the show's content and refused to clear it. As a result, until Fox took control of the station in January, its audio feed aired on a low-rated AM station.

Relations between Rivers and Fox management also deteriorated. In May 1987, Fox removed Rivers as the program's regular host, seven months after its premiere, as the network sought to improve its ratings by using other hosts. Rivers maintained that she had been fired, although Fox initially said that she could remain associated with the program and appear as an occasional guest host.

Rivers's final broadcast as regular host aired on May 15, 1987. During the closing portion of the program, guests overturned furniture and covered the set with toilet paper and shaving cream. Rivers told the audience that she had been informed of Fox's decision that day and said, "Sometimes things just don't work out."

=== Guest hosts ===
Soon afterward, the program continued as The Late Show with a rotating series of guest hosts. Among those who hosted during the first month after Rivers's departure were former Tomorrow host Tom Snyder, actress Suzanne Somers and actor Martin Sheen. Somers was invited back for multiple appearances, while Sheen hosted an edition featuring his son Emilio Estevez, Helen Shaver, Malick Bowens, comedians Mack and Jamie, Dick Van Patten and homeless advocate Mitch Snyder.

Frank Zappa was scheduled to guest-host the program on June 12, 1987, but Fox canceled his appearance shortly before the broadcast. Zappa had proposed guests including journalist Daniel Schorr and Gerard Straub, a former producer of The 700 Club, for a discussion that was expected to include allegations concerning Pat Robertson and the Nicaraguan Contras.

Comedian Arsenio Hall was brought in to host the June 12 broadcast in Zappa's place. His guests included actress and singer Gloria Loring, comedian Bob Zany and a hand puppeteer. Hall subsequently became one of the program's recurring guest hosts and was later given an extended run as host.

=== The Howard Stern Show ===
On April 16, 1987, a meeting was held between Howard Stern and management of WNYW, Fox's flagship television station. The network was considering Stern as replacement to The Late Show. Five one-hour pilots titled The Howard Stern Show were recorded at a cost of about $400,000. They featured rock guitarist Leslie West of Mountain fame as band leader and Steve Rossi as announcer and singer. By early June, air dates were yet to be scheduled; the pilots were instead being tested among focus groups in California. With no formal announcement, in July, the network decided not to put the Stern show on the air. Paul Noble, the former executive producer for WNYW, was never told of Fox's decision. "By today's standards, they were absolutely tame." He also said, "They were not the kind of thing that a local New York television station was prepared to get involved with at that time. It was more like off-the-wall radio."

=== Arsenio Hall ===
Arsenio Hall first appeared as one of the rotating guest hosts used after Rivers's departure. He was brought in on short notice to replace Frank Zappa for the June 12, 1987, broadcast. Hall continued to appear as a guest host and proved more successful with viewers than Fox had anticipated. Although The Late Show had already been slated for replacement, his ratings demonstrated his appeal as a talk-show host.

Fox eventually gave Hall an extended run while it developed the program's replacement, The Wilton North Report. His run as regular host began in September 1987 and continued through November 27.

Hall left the program after committing to co-star with Eddie Murphy in Coming to America. Fox later attempted to retain him for The Wilton North Report, but Hall was unavailable because of the film commitment. Hall later said that his reception on The Late Show prompted Paramount, with which he already had a contractual relationship, to reconsider his potential as a television host.

Clint Holmes remained the announcer during Hall's tenure, and Mark Hudson continued as bandleader.

=== Wilton North cancelation and Late Show return ===
Fox replaced The Late Show with The Wilton North Report, whose premiere was delayed from November 30 to December 11, 1987, while the producers reworked its opening news segment. During the postponement, Fox filled the late-night time slot with reruns of Arsenio Hall-hosted editions of The Late Show.

The Wilton North Report was canceled in January 1988 after only a few weeks on the air, and Fox again used reruns of The Late Show while developing another late-night program.

Beginning January 11, Fox temporarily filled the 11:30 p.m. time slot with reruns of Arsenio Hall-hosted episodes of The Late Show while developing another late-night program. Fox spokesman Brad Turrell said the network intended to remain in late-night television and cited Hall's earlier stint as evidence that a new host could succeed in the time period.

New episodes began airing March 10, 1988, with comedians Jeff Joseph and John Mulrooney as guest hosts; Daniel Rosen took over as announcer, while Jack Mack and the Heart Attack became the new house band. The new version of the show aired while the Tonight Show was in reruns due to the 1988 Writers Guild of America strike.

The program continued producing new episodes during the strike, which lasted from March 7 to August 7, 1988. The strike began four days before the revamped version of The Late Show premiered on March 10. Fox spokesman Michael Binkow said the labour dispute would not halt production because hosts Jeff Joseph and John Mulrooney were stand-up comedians who wrote their own material.

=== Ross Shafer ===
After a period of guest hosts, Fox selected Seattle television personality Ross Shafer as the regular host of The Late Show in April 1988. By May, Shafer had been hosting for approximately five weeks. Fox programming executive Peter Chernin said that the program was better produced than its previous incarnations and praised Shafer as a host, although the network was still attempting to refine the format.

After Shafer became the permanent host on April 15, the program continued production for the duration of the strike, relying in part on unscripted segments and theme shows until the strike ended on August 7, 1988.

The program continued to receive low ratings. Fox announced in October 1988 that it was canceling The Late Show effective October 14 and would not immediately replace it with another weeknight late-night program. Repeats aired for the second half of October until the program's final airdate of October 28, 1988.

Fox did not immediately replace The Late Show with another late-night program. Instead, affiliates were given back the 11 p.m. hour for local or syndicated programming.

==== Notable episodes ====
Shafer's tenure included several reunion and special-topic broadcasts.

- A few weeks after the 8th Golden Raspberry Awards, Bill Cosby appeared on The Late Show to accept the three awards won by Leonard Part 6: Worst Picture, Worst Actor and Worst Screenplay. Cosby became the first Razzie recipient to accept an award. At his request, the trophies presented to him were made of 24-karat gold and Italian marble.
- A reunion of the cast of the 1960s television series Batman aired on April 28, 1988. Participants included Adam West, Burt Ward, Frank Gorshin, Julie Newmar, Yvonne Craig, Alan Napier and Eartha Kitt, with Cesar Romero appearing in a prerecorded interview; Batmobile designer George Barris also appeared. The episode was one of Napier's final television appearances before his death on August 8, 1988.
- A reunion of the entire regular cast of Gilligan's Island aired on May 18, 1988, with Bob Denver, Alan Hale Jr., Jim Backus, Natalie Schafer, Tina Louise, Russell Johnson and Dawn Wells, as well as series creator Sherwood Schwartz. It was the last appearance of all seven regular cast members together; Backus died the following year. The program used a specially constructed set based on the series.
- A program devoted to television game shows featured former hosts Gene Rayburn, Gary Owens, Tom Kennedy, Dennis James and Jim Lange, along with Fred Wostbrock, co-author of The Encyclopedia of TV Game Shows. Shafer later succeeded Rayburn as host of the 1990 revival of Match Game.
- Artist Mark Kostabi appeared on the program, wrapping Shafer in aluminum foil and throwing money into the studio audience. Footage from the appearance was later used in the documentary Con Artist, directed by Michael Sladek.
- A reunion marking the tenth anniversary of National Lampoon's Animal House featured Tim Matheson, Martha Smith, Stephen Furst, James Daughton and John Vernon and aired on October 6, 1988.

== Legacy ==
The failure of The Late Show had significant consequences for several of its principal figures. Edgar Rosenberg, Rivers's husband, manager and executive producer of the program, died by suicide on August 14, 1987, three months after Rivers was fired from Fox. Rivers later described the cancellation of the Fox program and Rosenberg's death as a low point in her career.

Rivers returned to daily television with the syndicated daytime program The Joan Rivers Show in 1989. In 1990, she won the Daytime Emmy Award for Outstanding Talk Show Host for the program.

Arsenio Hall's guest-hosting stint on The Late Show helped establish him as a late-night television personality. His syndicated The Arsenio Hall Show premiered on January 3, 1989, and was distributed by Paramount to more than 100 stations, including many Fox affiliates.

Ross Shafer later hosted ABC's 1990 revival of Match Game, which premiered on July 16, 1990.

CBS later adopted the title The Late Show for an unrelated late-night franchise beginning with Late Show with David Letterman in 1993. The CBS program had no connection to the earlier Fox series.

Fox's next attempt at a late-night talk show was the short-lived The Chevy Chase Show in 1993.

== See also ==
- List of late night network TV programs
