= Melissa Rivers =

American television host (born 1968)

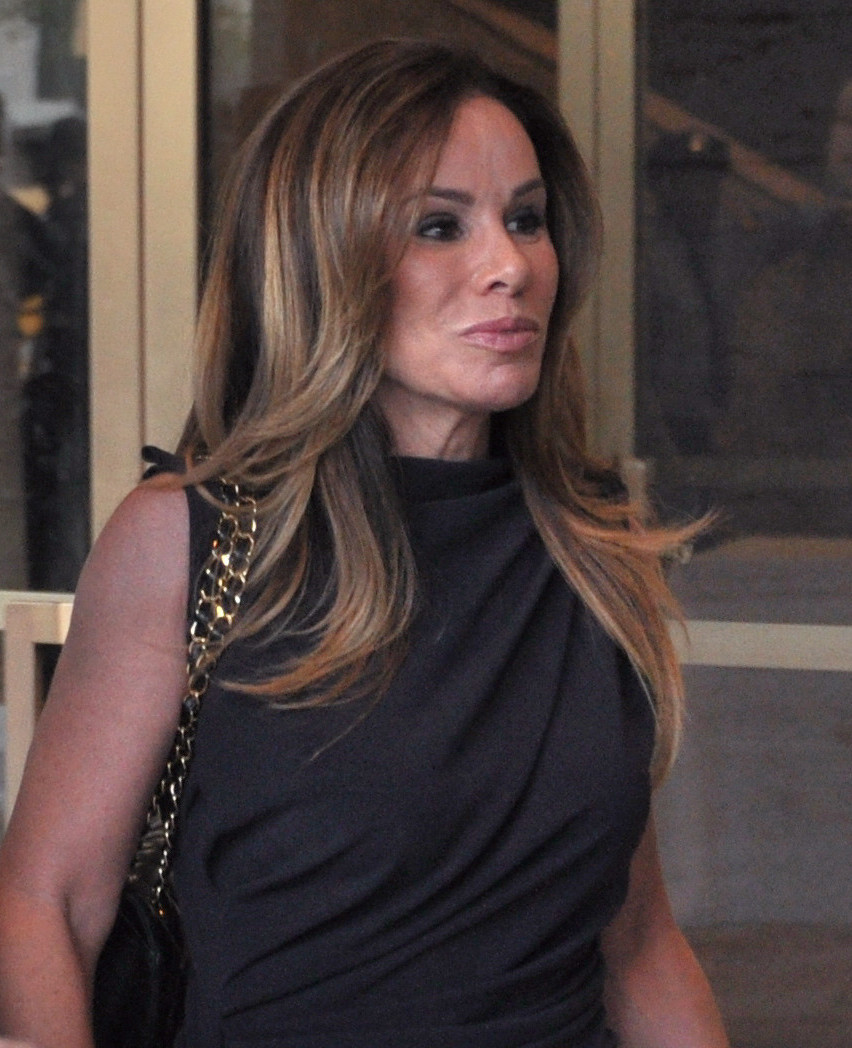
- Rivers during New York Fashion Week in 2012
- Born: Melissa Warburg Rosenberg; January 20, 1968 (age 58); New York City, New York, U.S.
- Other name: Melissa Endicott
- Education: University of Pennsylvania (BA)
- Occupations: Television host; producer; actress
- Years active: 1978–present
- Television: Joan & Melissa: Joan Knows Best?, Fashion Police
- Spouses: John Endicott (m. 1998; div. 2003) Steve Mitchel (m. 2025)
- Children: 1
- Parents: Edgar Rosenberg (father); Joan Rivers (mother)
- Website: melissarivers.com

Melissa Warburg Rosenberg (born January 20, 1968), known professionally as Melissa Rivers, is an American television host and actress. She is the only child of comedian Joan Rivers and producer Edgar Rosenberg.

== Early life ==
Melissa Warburg Rosenberg was born on January 20, 1968, in New York City. She is the only child of Joan Rivers and Edgar Rosenberg. She spent the majority of her childhood in Los Angeles, California. She attended the John Thomas Dye School, Marlborough School, and The Buckley School. Rivers started dancing at the age of 8, taking once-a-week group lessons. She became more serious about the activity at the age of 12, taking regular private lessons.

Rivers attended the University of Pennsylvania, where in 1989 she graduated with a Bachelor of Arts in history. During her second year of college, her father Edgar committed suicide. In 1990, she took on her mother's stage surname, after which she became known as Melissa Rivers.

== Career ==
As an actress, Rivers has had roles in television shows including Beverly Hills 90210, Silk Stalkings and The Comeback. In 1998, she also appeared in the sci-fi/comedy made-for-television movie Men in White and in the 1999 film The Big Tease, a comedy directed by Kevin Allen starring Craig Ferguson. She and her mother, Joan Rivers, portrayed themselves in the 1994 celebrity docudrama Tears and Laughter: The Joan and Melissa Rivers Story.

In the early 1990s, she branched out on the pre-show red carpet, interviewing celebrities on nationally televised awards shows. Rivers, who has hosted various events and served as a producer for the E! Network, has hosted two of the channel's highest-rated specials: Oh Baby! Melissa’s Guide to Pregnancy and Oh Toddler! Surviving the Early Years (aired in January 2002).

With her mother, she hosted fashion on the red carpet interviews for the E! cable network. In 2003, they left the red carpet pre-show on E! to accept a more lucrative deal with the TV Guide Channel valued at between $6 and $8 million. Also in 2003, she appeared on the ABC Network competitive reality show I'm a Celebrity... Get Me Out of Here!. She has been a regular guest on the webcast show Tom Green's House Tonight.

In 2013, she was a co-creator and co-producer of Joan's YouTube web series In Bed with Joan, a 15- to 30-minute show with a new video uploaded weekly in which Joan interviewed a celebrity about a wide variety of personal topics in Joan's bed, with Melissa conducting interview questions for the last several minutes. Featured videos that have garnered the most views featured comedians Kathy Griffin, Sarah Silverman, and Margaret Cho, television personalities Kelly Osbourne and RuPaul, as well as YouTubers Jenna Mourey (Jenna "Marbles"), Grace Helbig ("itsgrace") and Justine Ezarik ("iJustine"). Other guests included Russell Peters, Gary Busey, Rob Delaney, Gabriel Iglesias, Carmen Electra, Lance Bass, Howie Mandel, Chris Hardwick, Bill Engvall, Tom Green, Penn Jillette, Aisha Tyler, Anthony Jeselnik, Eric André, Theo Von, Nick Kroll and T.J. Miller. In 2013, Melissa and Joan were honored by the Ride of Fame and a double decker tour bus was dedicated to them.

On August 31, 2015, Fashion Police began featuring Rivers as a co-host.

In 2019, Rivers began hosting the Melissa Rivers’ Group Text podcast with Hurrdat Media Network.

In 2025, Rivers began hosting the "Women Our Age" podcast.

== Philanthropy ==
In 2003, Rivers appeared in a PETA anti-fur ad campaign, encouraging consumers to "Fake It...for the Animals' Sake."

She raised $100,000 for the Make-A-Wish Foundation, resulting from ABC's 2006 television show I'm a Celebrity... Get Me Out of Here! Live. On June 24, 2008, Rivers appeared on the NBC game show Celebrity Family Feud as part of the Rivers Family Team. She and her mother first battled against the Ice-T Family Team, then went on to compete against the Raven-Symoné Family Team. They won $50,000 for their charity, Guide Dogs for the Blind.

She appeared on the NBC reality television program Celebrity Apprentice playing for the Lili Claire Foundation. She was fired in the episode that aired April 26, 2009, after which she stormed out of the boardroom, verbally assaulted teammates Annie Duke and Brande Roderick, yelled at the production crew, and refused the obligatory exit interview. Her mother was also a contestant on that season of The Apprentice, and threatened to quit the show after Melissa's firing, but remained and ultimately won the competition.

She raised $22,250 on a special celebrity edition of Who Wants to Be a Millionaire, where all the celebrities played to raise money for the research of Alzheimer's disease.

== Personal life ==
Rivers married horse trainer John Endicott in December 1998, at New York City's Plaza Hotel in a $3 million wedding. They divorced in 2003. She has one son from that marriage, Edgar Cooper Endicott (b. 2000) who was featured with Rivers and her mother in the reality show Joan & Melissa: Joan Knows Best? She was in a relationship with sports coach Jason Zimmerman from 2008 to 2011.

In January 2015, Rivers filed a malpractice lawsuit against the clinic and doctors who performed surgery on her mother that caused her death.

From 2015 to 2021, Rivers was in a relationship with talent agent Mark Rousso.

In 2022 Rivers met attorney Steve Mitchel at a Didi Hirsch Mental Health and Suicide Prevention event. Rivers served as a Co-Chairman of the organization's board of directors and Mitchel was accompanying a friend. The couple got engaged in October 2023. On March 15, 2025, Rivers and Mitchel married in Jackson Hole.

In January 2025, her home was destroyed in the Palisades Fire.

== Filmography ==
Year	Film	Role	Notes
1978	Rabbit Test	Little girl	Feature film
1991	Beverly Hills, 90210	Mackenzie	Episode: "Fame Is Where You Find It"
1993	MTV Spring Break '93 Blind Date	Host	with Jon Stewart
1994	Tears and Laughter: The Joan and Melissa Rivers Story	Herself	Television film
1998	Tracey Takes On...	Herself	Episode: "Hollywood"
1998	Men in White	Female Reporter #1	Television film
1999	Silk Stalkings	Tegan Cook	Episode: "A Clockwork Florida Orange"
1999	The Big Tease	Dianne Abbott	Television film
2000	Best Actress	Herself	Television film
2001	Just Shoot Me!	Herself	Episode: "Sugar Momma"
2004	Out for Blood	Talk Show Host	Direct-to-video
2004	Dave the Barbarian	Princess Irmaplotz (voice)	Recurring role; 3 episodes
2005	The L Word	Herself	Cameo Appearance; 1 episode "Lagrimos de Oro"
2005	I Love the '80s 3-D	Herself	Episode: "1989"
2007–2008	Jury Duty	Herself	Guest star; 5 episodes
2009	The Bold and the Beautiful	Herself	Guest star; 4 episodes
2009–2015	The Apprentice	Herself	Host; 12 episodes
2010	Cubed	Human Resource Rep	Guest star
2011–2013	Joan & Melissa: Joan Knows Best?	Herself	Co-executive producer; 26 episodes Main cast; 34 episodes
2013–2014	In Bed with Joan	Herself	Executive producer; 71 episodes Guest star; 4 episodes
2015	Joy	Joan Rivers	Feature film
2010–2017	Fashion Police	Herself	Executive producer; 112 episodes Host; 31 episodes
2016–2023	Hell's Kitchen	Herself	Chef's table guest diner for the blue team in Season 16; Guest diner in Season 22

== Books ==
- Red Carpet Ready: Secrets for Making the Most of Any Moment You're in the Spotlight (Harmony, 2010) ISBN 9780307395320
- The Book of Joan: Tales of Mirth, Mischief, and Manipulation. Crown Archetype. 2015. (Biography/Humor) ISBN 9781101903827
- Joan Rivers Confidential: The Unseen Scrapbooks, Joke Cards, Personal Files, and Photos of a Very Funny Woman Who Kept Everything. Abrams. 2017. ISBN 9781419726736

== Honors ==
- On March 1, 2013, Rivers and her mother, Joan Rivers, were honored by the Ride of Fame and a double decker tour bus was dedicated to them in New York City.
