= Joan Rivers =

American comedian and television host (1933–2014)

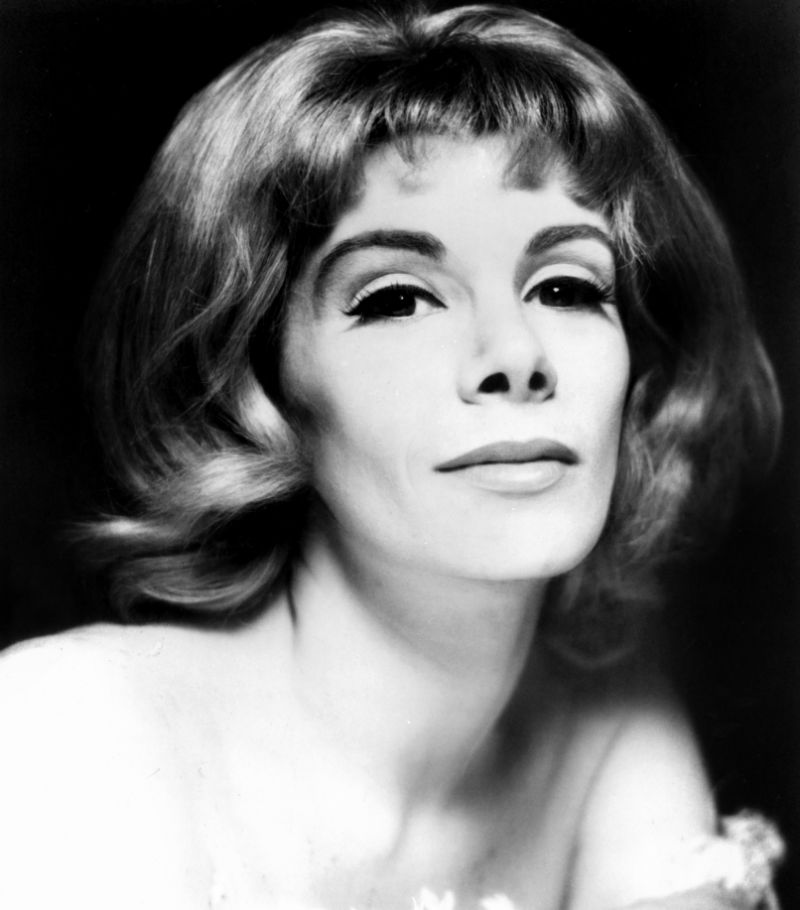
- Rivers in 1966
- Born: Joan Alexandra Molinsky; June 8, 1933; Brooklyn, New York City, U.S.
- Died: September 4, 2014 (aged 81); Manhattan, New York City, U.S.
- Education: Connecticut College; Barnard College (BA)
- Occupations: Comedian; actress; producer; writer; television host
- Years active: 1956–2014
- Works: Full list
- Spouses: James Sanger (m. 1955; ann. 1955); Edgar Rosenberg (m. 1965; died 1987)
- Partner: Orin Lehman (1993–2001)
- Children: Melissa Rivers

Comedy career
- Medium: Stand-up; television; film; literature; theater
- Genres: Observational comedy; insult comedy; shock comedy; black comedy; blue comedy; improvisational comedy
- Website: joanrivers.com

Joan Alexandra Molinsky (June 8, 1933 – September 4, 2014), known professionally as Joan Rivers, was an American comedian, actress, producer, writer and television host. She was noted for her blunt, often controversial comedic persona that was heavily self-deprecating and acerbic, especially towards celebrities and politicians, delivered in her signature New York accent. She is considered a pioneer of women in comedy. She received an Emmy Award and a Grammy Award, as well as nomination for a Tony Award.

Rivers began her career in comedy clubs in Greenwich Village alongside her peers George Carlin, Woody Allen and Richard Pryor. She then rose to prominence in 1965 as a guest on The Tonight Show. Hosted by her mentor, Johnny Carson, the show established Rivers's comedic style. In 1986, with her own rival program, The Late Show with Joan Rivers, Rivers became the first woman to host a late night network television talk show. She subsequently hosted The Joan Rivers Show (1989–1993), winning a Daytime Emmy for Outstanding Talk Show Host. From the mid-1990s, she became known for her comedic red carpet awards show celebrity interviews. Rivers co-hosted the E! celebrity fashion show Fashion Police from 2010 to 2014 and starred in the reality series Joan & Melissa: Joan Knows Best? (2011–2014) with daughter Melissa Rivers.

In addition to marketing a line of jewelry and apparel on the QVC shopping channel, Rivers authored twelve best-selling books and three LP comedy albums under her own name: Mr. Phyllis and Other Funny Stories (Warner Bros 1965), The Next to Last Joan Rivers Album (Buddah 1969) and What Becomes a Semi-Legend Most? (Geffen 1983). She was nominated in 1984 for a Grammy Award for her album What Becomes a Semi-Legend Most? and was nominated in 1994 for the Tony Award for Best Actress in a Play for her performance of the title role in Sally Marr ... and Her Escorts. In 2009, Rivers competed alongside her daughter Melissa on the second season of The Celebrity Apprentice, ultimately winning the season. In 2015, Rivers posthumously received a Grammy Award for Best Spoken Word Album for her book, Diary of a Mad Diva.

In 1968, The New York Times television critic Jack Gould called Rivers "quite possibly the most intuitively funny woman alive". In 2017, Rolling Stone magazine ranked her sixth on its list of the 50 best stand-up comics of all time, and in October the same year, she was inducted into the Television Academy Hall of Fame. She is the subject of the documentary Joan Rivers: A Piece of Work (2010).

== Early life and education ==
Rivers was born Joan Alexandra Molinsky on June 8, 1933, in the Brooklyn borough of New York City, to Russian Jewish immigrants Beatrice (née Grushman) and Meyer C. Molinsky, a doctor. She had an older sister named Barbara Waxler. Rivers spent her early life in Prospect Heights and Crown Heights in Brooklyn. At age eight, she created her first alter ego, J. Sondra Meredith. She attended the Brooklyn Society for Ethical Culture School, a progressive and since-defunct school and Adelphi Academy of Brooklyn, a college preparatory day school, where she was co-chair of her school, due to her past experiences in theatrical activities. Within two years, she performed in the School Cavalcades and in 1949, aged sixteen, she was vice president of the Dramatic Club. She graduated from the Adelphi Academy of Brooklyn, in 1951, at eighteen. In her adolescence, Rivers relocated with her family to Larchmont, north of New York City.

Rivers matriculated at Connecticut College; it was a family legacy to attend the institution, as her sister had done. Rivers stated in interviews that she was overweight throughout her childhood, adolescence and in college and that it had a profound impact on her body image, which she struggled with throughout her life. After two years, she transferred to Barnard College, where she graduated in 1954 with a B.A. in English literature and anthropology.

Rivers repeatedly said, and it was reported in The Washington Post, that she graduated summa cum laude and as a member of Phi Beta Kappa; however, biographers James Spada and Leslie Bennetts found that these were fabrications, as with other assertions such as sharing a lesbian kiss in a play with Barbra Streisand (they did both appear in a play named Driftwood, but were never on stage at the same time).

Before entering show business, Rivers worked at various jobs such as a tour guide at Rockefeller Center, a writer/proofreader at an advertising agency and a fashion consultant at Bond Clothing Stores. During this period, agent Tony Rivers (not the singer) advised her to change her name, so she chose Joan Rivers as her stage name. She stated that he stopped sending her to audition because of this.

== Career ==
=== 1950s–1960s ===
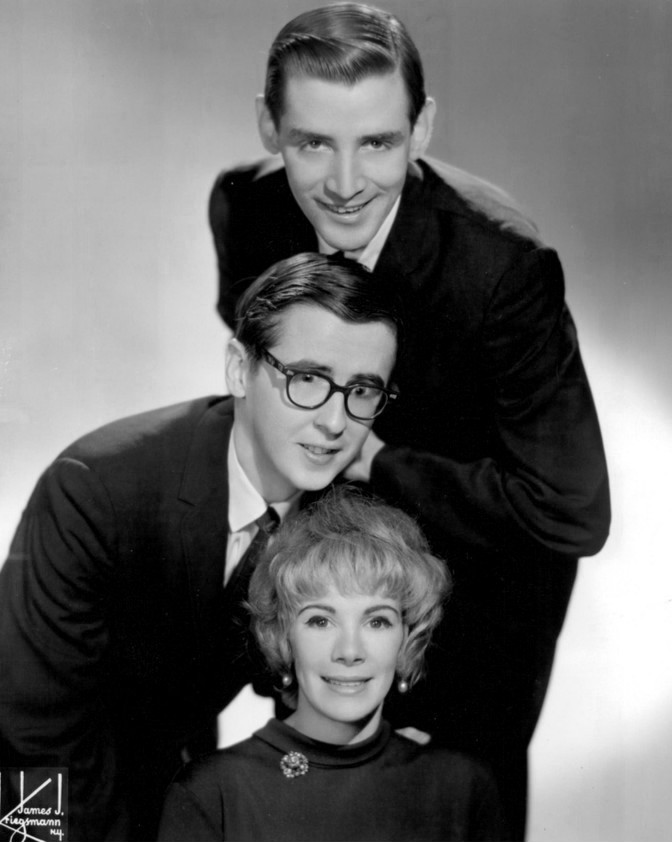
Rivers with Jim Connell and Jake Holmes in "Jim, Jake & Joan", early 1960s

During the late 1950s, Rivers appeared in a short off-Broadway play called Driftwood alongside Barbra Streisand. According to an interview with Adweek, the play ran for six weeks at the playwright Maurice Tei Dunn's apartment on 49th Street in New York. In the early 1960s, Rivers performed at various comedy clubs in Greenwich Village, including The Bitter End, The Gaslight Cafe and The Duplex. It was during this period that she befriended fellow comedians Woody Allen and George Carlin, often sharing meals with them. Rivers also had the opportunity to work alongside renowned musicians Bob Dylan, Barbra Streisand, Carly Simon, and Simon & Garfunkel in the Village.

She then moved to Chicago, where she famously flung an ashtray at the ground in fury during her audition for The Second City.

In 1961, Rivers made her MainStage debut in Second City’s seventh revue, Alarums and Excursions, her only production at the theater. Later in life, she would state that she was "born as a comedian at Second City. I owe it my career."

Between 1963 and 1964, Rivers joined forces with Jim Connell and Jake Holmes in the cabaret act "Jim, Jake & Joan". Their appearance at The Bitter End in 1964 led to their inclusion in the motion picture Once Upon A Coffee House, marking Rivers's first credit in a feature film. However, the group disbanded soon after. Holmes later recalled an incident that led to their separation: "We were supposed to perform at a rally for Bobby Kennedy, who was running for New York senator in 1964. Joan showed up wearing a [Republican Senate nominee Kenneth] Keating button, and Jim told her to remove it. She refused, staunchly sticking to her political beliefs, and Jim said, 'Who needs you, anyway?' That was the end of Jim, Jake & Joan..."

Rivers also made a guest appearance on The Tonight Show, hosted by Jack Paar, which originated in New York. She secured her first professional writing gig penning a Topo Gigio routine for The Ed Sullivan Show. In 1965, she worked as a gag writer and participant on Candid Camera, where she played the role of "the bait" to lure people into humorous situations for the show. After seven auditions over three years, she finally made her first appearance on The Tonight Show with its new host, Johnny Carson, on February 17, 1965. Rivers considered this episode to be her breakthrough, as Carson famously told her, "you're gonna be a star." She became a frequent guest on the show and developed a close friendship with Carson.

Her profile skyrocketed in the following years, and she began to make frequent guest appearances on popular shows like The Ed Sullivan Show, The Mike Douglas Show, The Dick Cavett Show, and Girl Talk with Virginia Graham. She even wrote material for the puppet mouse Topo Gigio. In addition, she had a small role in the cult drama film The Swimmer (1968), alongside Burt Lancaster. Around the same time, she hosted a short-lived syndicated daytime talk show called That Show with Joan Rivers, which premiered on September 16, 1968. Each episode had a unique theme, and Rivers opened with a monologue related to that day's topic, then hosted celebrity interviews. The show also featured an expert on the subject and a celebrity guest. Early episodes featured prominent figures such as Johnny Carson, Jerry Lewis, Joel Grey, Don Rickles, and Godfrey Cambridge. During the mid-1960s, she released at least two comedy albums: The Next to Last Joan Rivers Album and Rivers Presents Mr. Phyllis & Other Funny Stories.

=== 1970s ===
By the 1970s, Rivers continued to be a prominent fixture on television. Along with her other guest-spots on the late-night circuit, she also made appearances on The Carol Burnett Show, had a semi-regular stint on Hollywood Squares and guest-starred on Here's Lucy. Rivers made her Broadway debut in the play Fun City, which opened on January 2, 1972, and co-starred Gabriel Dell, Rose Marie and Paul Ford. It ran for only nine performances amid a negative critical reception. Though a New York Times reviewer criticized the production as "frenetic to the point of being frazzled," he praised Rivers as "a deft comedy writer" and "a very funny lady". From 1972 to 1976, she narrated The Adventures of Letterman, an animated segment for The Electric Company.

In 1973, Rivers co-wrote the made-for-television movie The Girl Most Likely To..., a black comedy starring Stockard Channing as an ugly girl who becomes beautiful after undergoing plastic surgery, and takes revenge on people who previously mistreated her. The film, based on Rivers's story, became a ratings success and has been considered a "cult classic". She also wrote a thrice-weekly column for The Chicago Tribune from 1973 to 1976, and published her first book, Having a Baby Can Be a Scream, in 1974; she described it as a "catalogue of gynaecological anxieties". In 1978, Rivers made her directorial debut with the comedy Rabbit Test, which she also wrote and which starred her friend Billy Crystal in his film debut as the world's first pregnant man. The film earned 12 million dollars at the box office. Janet Maslin of The New York Times concluded: "Miss Rivers has turned to directing without paying much heed to whether a whole movie constructed from one-liners is worth even the sum of its parts." During the same decade, she was the opening act for singers Helen Reddy, Robert Goulet, Paul Anka, Mac Davis, and Sergio Franchi on the Las Vegas Strip.

=== 1980s ===
During the early and mid-1980s, Rivers found further success in stand-up and television, though the decade subsequently proved to be controversial for her. The year 1983, in particular, was very successful; she performed at Carnegie Hall in February, did the March stand-up special An Audience with Joan Rivers, hosted the April 9 episode of Saturday Night Live, and released the best-selling comedy album What Becomes a Semi-Legend Most?, which reached No. 22 on the U.S. Billboard 200 and was nominated for a Grammy Award for Best Comedy Album. By August 1983, Carson established Rivers as his first permanent guest host on The Tonight Show. At the time, she spoke of her primary Tonight Show life as having been "Johnny Carson's daughter", a reference to his longtime mentoring of her.

During the 1980s and 1990s, Rivers served on the advisory board of the National Student Film Institute. A friend of Nancy Reagan, Rivers attended a state dinner in 1983, and later performed at a luncheon at the 1984 Republican National Convention. In 1984, Rivers published a best-selling humor book, The Life and Hard Times of Heidi Abramowitz, a mock memoir of her brassy, loose comedy character, which was mostly jokes about promiscuity – of a type that would have been considered unacceptable even in burlesque a generation earlier. A television special based on the character, a mock tribute called Joan Rivers and Friends Salute Heidi Abramowitz: Tramp of the Century, later aired on Showtime. She later wrote her next book, Enter Talking, which was released in 1986, and described her rise to stardom and the evolution of her comedic persona.

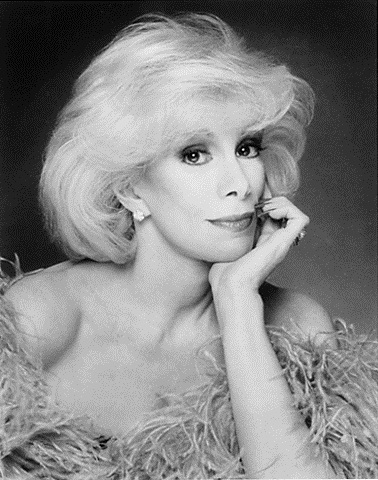
Rivers in 1987

In 1986, the move came that ended Rivers's longtime friendship with Johnny Carson. The soon-to-launch Fox Television Network announced that it was giving her a late night talk show, The Late Show Starring Joan Rivers, making Rivers the first woman to have her own late-night talk show on a major network. The new network planned to broadcast the show 11 p.m. to midnight Eastern Time, making her a Carson competitor. Carson learned of the show from Fox and not from Rivers. In the documentary Johnny Carson: King of Late Night, Rivers said that she only called Carson to discuss the matter after learning that he may have already heard about it and that he immediately hung up on her. "And he never spoke to me again. He took it as a complete betrayal," said Rivers. In the same interview, she said that she later came to believe that maybe she should have asked for his blessing before taking the job. Rivers was banned from ever appearing on The Tonight Show for the rest of Carson's tenure and the entire runs of Carson's first two successors Jay Leno and Conan O'Brien out of respect for Carson. Rivers did not appear on The Tonight Show again until February 17, 2014, at the age of 80, when she made a brief appearance on new host Jimmy Fallon's first episode. On March 27, 2014, Rivers returned to the show for an interview.

The Late Show Starring Joan Rivers premiered on October 9, 1986, but Rivers's tenure was short-lived. When Rivers challenged Fox executives, who wanted to fire her husband Edgar Rosenberg as the show's producer, the network fired them both on May 15, 1987.

On August 14, 1987, Rosenberg committed suicide in Philadelphia; Rivers blamed the tragedy on his "humiliation" by Fox. Shortly after Rosenberg's suicide the magazine GQ published what was purported to be an interview with Rivers, written by "Bert Hacker". The piece quoted Rivers saying terrible things about her dead spouse. One quote was "Listen, when I think of the way he makes me crazy, I really wonder if they didn't execute the wrong Rosenbergs." In fact, Bert Hacker was a pseudonym used by former Nixon speechwriter and sometime comic Ben Stein, who had never met Rivers and simply made up the entire account. Rivers sued Stein for libel and won an undisclosed amount which was distributed to charities she designated. Rivers credited Nancy Reagan with helping her after her husband's suicide.

During the airing of her late-night show, Rivers made the voice-over role of Dot Matrix in the science-fiction comedy Spaceballs (1987), a parody based (mainly) on Star Wars. The film, directed by and co-starring Mel Brooks, was a critical and commercial success, later becoming a "cult classic". After the Fox controversy, her career went into hiatus. Rivers subsequently appeared on various television shows, including the Pee-wee's Playhouse Christmas Special in December 1989. She also appeared as one of the center square occupants on the 1986–89 version of The Hollywood Squares, hosted by John Davidson. On September 5, 1989, The Joan Rivers Show, her daytime television program, premiered in broadcast syndication. The show, which ran for five seasons, was a success and earned Rivers the Daytime Emmy in 1990 for Outstanding Talk Show Host. Entertainment Weekly, in a September 1990 article, asserted: "The Joan Rivers Show is a better showcase for her funny edginess than her doomed 1988 Fox nighttime program was. The best thing about her daytime talker is that Rivers' stream-of-consciousness chattiness is allowed to guide the show — you never know where the conversation is going to go."

=== 1990s ===
In addition to winning the Emmy for The Joan Rivers Show, Rivers starred in the made-for-television comedy How to Murder a Millionaire, which premiered in May 1990 on CBS. In the film, co-starring Alex Rocco and Telma Hopkins, she took on the role of a Beverly Hills matron possessed with the idea her husband is trying to kill her. Also in 1990, she started to design jewelry, clothing and beauty products for the shopping channel QVC. On this professional endeavor, Rivers said: "In those days, only dead celebrities went on [QVC]. My career was over. I had bills to pay. ... It also intrigued me at the beginning". The sales of Rivers's products exceeded $1 billion by 2014, making her one of the network's top sellers. In 1991, she wrote her next book, Still Talking, which described the cancellation of her late-night show and her husband's suicide. Until 1993, she received five additional Emmy nominations for her daytime talk-show The Joan Rivers Show — two for Outstanding Writing – Special Class and three for Outstanding Talk Show Host.

In 1994, Rivers and daughter Melissa first hosted the E! Entertainment Television pre-awards show for the Golden Globe Awards and, beginning in 1995, E!'s annual Academy Awards pre-awards show as well. Rivers and her daughter quickly became credited for revolutionizing the red carpet as a space to showcase designers' work and celebrity interactions. "Joan and Melissa were the first people who came out and made it more of a true conversation between star and reporter", E!'s Senior Vice President of production, Gary Snegaroff, remarked to Vanity Fair. "They asked about what [actresses] were wearing because that's what the magazines would cover after the fact, and turned it into a candid conversation on the carpet where anything could happen". Rivers and Melissa, at the time, both portrayed themselves in the made-for-television drama Tears and Laughter: The Joan and Melissa Rivers Story, which chronicled the aftermath of Rosenberg's suicide. It aired on NBC on May 15, 1994. The next year, she wrote her book Jewelry by Joan Rivers.

Influenced by the stand-up comedy of Lenny Bruce, Rivers co-wrote and starred in a play about Bruce's mother Sally Marr, who was also a comic and influenced her son's development as a comic. After 27 previews, Sally Marr ... and Her Escorts, a play "suggested by the life of Sally Marr" ran on Broadway for 50 performances in May and June 1994. The production received mixed reviews, but her performance was applauded by critics. The Chicago Sun Times found Rivers to be "compelling" as an actress while The New York Times wrote: "... [S]he is exuberant, fearless and inexhaustible. If you admire performers for taking risks, then you can't help but applaud her efforts". Rivers was nominated for a Drama Desk Award as Outstanding Actress in a Play and a Tony Award for Best Actress in a Play for playing Marr. Beginning in March 1997, Rivers hosted her own radio show on WOR in New York City for several years, and wrote three self-help books: Bouncing Back: I've Survived Everything ... and I Mean Everything ... and You Can Too! in 1997, From Mother to Daughter: Thoughts and Advice on Life, Love and Marriage in 1998, and Don't Count the Candles: Just Keep the Fire Lit!, in 1999.

=== 2000s ===
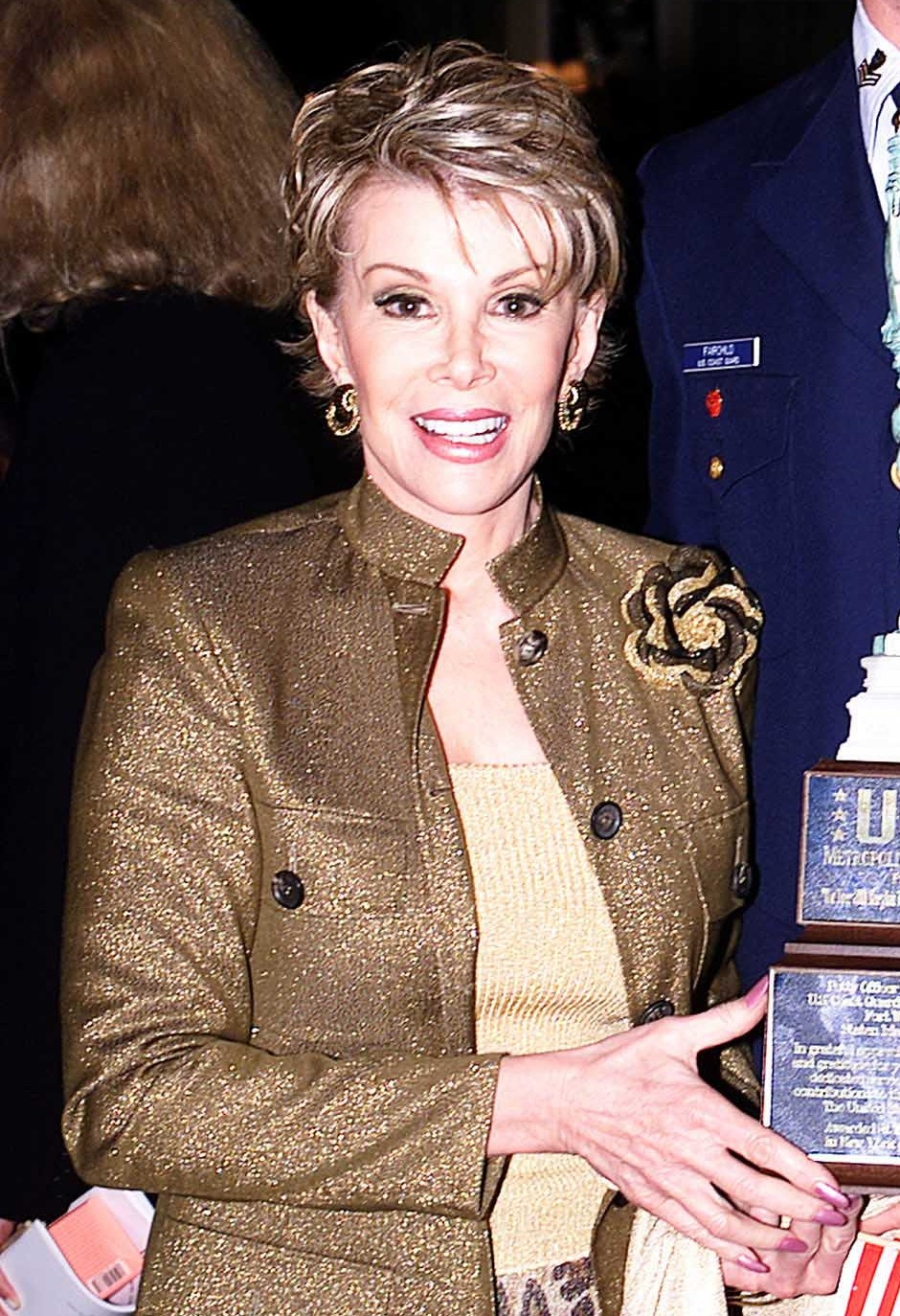
Rivers poses for a photograph at The Pierre hotel in New York City in 2001

Rivers was a guest speaker at the opening of the American Operating Room Nurses' San Francisco Conference in 2000, and by the first part of the decade, she continued to host the awards' red carpet for the E! channel. Between 2002 and 2004, she embarked on tour with her one-person comedy show Joan Rivers: Broke and Alone, which was presented in the United Kingdom (Edinburgh and London) and in the United States (Los Angeles, and Boston), to generally positive reviews. The Telegraph felt that her "hilarious assaults on fellow celebrities and tirades about the perils of ageing and plastic surgery are well worth the expense", while The Guardian remarked that "Rivers returned triumphant, a victorious heavyweight after a great fight, conscious that she is still the champion".

In 2003, Rivers left the network red-carpet show for a three-year contract (valued at $6–8 million) to cover award shows' red carpet events for the TV Guide Channel. Meanwhile, Rivers guest-starred as herself in several television series, including Curb Your Enthusiasm, Nip/Tuck, and Boston Legal, and also voiced herself for a brief scene in the 2004 animated fantasy film Shrek 2. In 2004, Rivers was part of the formal receiving party when Ronald Reagan was placed in state at the United States Capitol. On December 3, 2007, Rivers performed at the 79th Royal Variety Show at the Liverpool Empire Theatre, England, with Queen Elizabeth II and Prince Philip present. She wrote and starred in the play Joan Rivers: A Work in Progress by a Life in Progress, which was directed by Sean Foley, and presented through 2008 at the Geffen Playhouse in Los Angeles, the Edinburgh Festival Fringe and the Leicester Square Theatre, to a mixed critical reception.

In 2008, Rivers was invited to take part in a comedy event celebrating Prince Charles' 60th birthday titled, We Are Most Amused. She was the only American alongside Robin Williams invited to take part in the event. Other comedians included John Cleese, who served as the master of ceremonies, Eric Idle, Rowan Atkinson, and Bill Bailey. Those in attendance included Prince Charles, Camilla, Duchess of Cornwall and Prince Harry.

Throughout the decade, Rivers often appeared in various television game shows, including 8 Out of 10 Cats, Big Brother: Celebrity Hijack, and Celebrity Family Feud, in which she competed with her daughter against Ice-T and Coco. In 2009, Rivers and daughter Melissa were contestants on season eight of Celebrity Apprentice. During the season, each celebrity raised money for a charity of his or her choice; Rivers selected God's Love We Deliver. After a falling out with poker player Annie Duke, following Melissa's on-air firing (elimination) by Donald Trump, Rivers left the green room telling Clint Black and Jesse James that she would not be in the next morning. Rivers later returned to the show and on May 3, 2009, she became a finalist in the series. The other finalist was Duke. On the season finale, which aired live on May 10, Rivers was announced the winner and hired to be the 2009 Celebrity Apprentice.

Also in 2009, Rivers was a special "pink-carpet" presenter for the broadcast of the Sydney Gay and Lesbian Mardi Gras parade, was roasted in a Comedy Central special, and her reality show, How'd You Get So Rich?, premiered on TV Land. The program, which ran for two seasons, followed Rivers traveling around the United States interviewing self-made millionaires. She also wrote two books in 2009: Murder at the Academy Awards (R): A Red Carpet Murder Mystery and Men Are Stupid ... And They Like Big Boobs: A Woman's Guide to Beauty Through Plastic Surgery (with Valerie Frankel).

=== 2010s ===
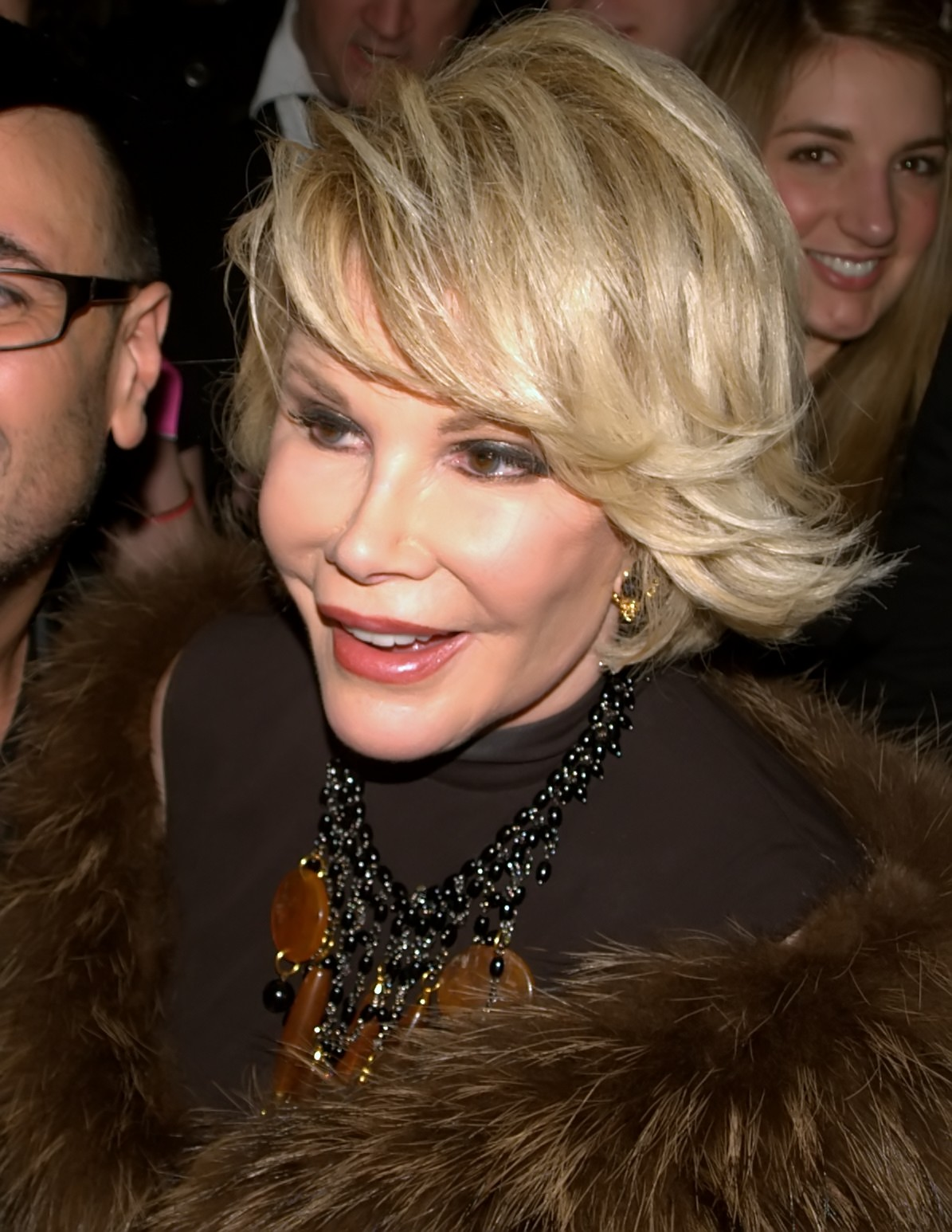
Rivers in 2010

A documentary film about Rivers, Joan Rivers: A Piece of Work, premiered at the Sundance Film Festival on January 25, 2010. The film follows Rivers for 14 months, mostly during the 76th year of her life, and made an effort to "[peel] away the mask" and expose the "struggles, sacrifices and joy of living life as a ground breaking female performer". The film was released in a limited release on June 11, 2010, and was acclaimed by critics for providing "an honest, behind-the-scenes look at [Rivers]' career — and at show business in general". Beginning on September 10, 2010, Rivers co-hosted the E! show Fashion Police, along with Giuliana Rancic, Kelly Osbourne, and George Kotsiopoulos, commenting on celebrity fashion. The show started as a half-hour program but due to its success with viewers, it was expanded to one hour on March 9, 2012. The August 26, 2014 episode of Fashion Police, about the 66th Primetime Emmy Awards and the 2014 MTV Movie Awards, was her last television appearance before her death.

In 2011, Rivers appeared in a commercial for Go Daddy, which debuted during the broadcast of Super Bowl XLV, and was featured as herself in the season two episode of Louis C.K.'s self-titled show Louie entitled "Joan", where she performed on stage and gave C.K. comedy advice. The A.V. Club's Nathan Rabin described the episode as a "funny and deeply moving exploration of the existential dilemma of the stand-up comic and a valentine to the artform." Also in 2011, Rivers and her daughter starred in the reality show Joan & Melissa: Joan Knows Best?, which premiered on We TV. The series follows her moving in with her daughter to California to be closer to her family. The show ran for four seasons until 2014. On the December 4, 2011 episode of The Simpsons, "The Ten-Per-Cent Solution", Rivers took on the role of Annie Dubinsky, an agent trying to revive Krusty's career. Hayden Childs of The A.V. Club praised the choice of having Rivers guest star since she was able to "employ her trademark humor within the world of The Simpsons without hijacking the plot or satire". In 2012, she guest-starred in two episodes of two series: Drop Dead Diva and Hot in Cleveland.

Rivers released her 11th book I Hate Everyone...Starting with Me on June 5, 2012. It received generally positive reviews and made The New York Times Best Seller list for several weeks. The New York Times remarked that there were "more punch lines per paragraph than any book I've read in years", and Publishers Weekly felt that "Rivers is equally passionate and opinionated on every subject she discusses. Hilarious and undeniably original". On August 7, 2012, Rivers showed up in Burbank, California to protest that the warehouse club Costco would not sell the book. She handcuffed herself to a shopping cart and shouted through a megaphone. The police were called to the scene and she left without incident; no arrests were made. On March 5, 2013, she launched the online talk show In Bed with Joan on YouTube. In it, Rivers invited a different guest to talk to her in bed about different things including their past, their love life and their career.

Rivers released her 12th book, Diary of a Mad Diva, on July 1, 2014, which also made The New York Times Best Seller list. For the book, she posthumously won the Grammy Award for Best Spoken Word Album in 2015. Before her death, she filmed a part, along with other female comedians, for the documentary Makers: Women in Comedy, which premiered on PBS in October 2014.

== Comedic style ==
He was an epiphany. Lenny told the truth. It was a total affirmation for me that I was on the right track long before anyone said it to me. He supplied the revelation that personal truth can be the foundation of comedy, that outrageousness can be cleansing and healthy. It went off inside me like an enormous flash.

— Rivers on seeing Lenny Bruce perform at a local club while she was in college, which influenced her developing style

During her over five-decade career as a comedian, her tough-talking style of satirical humor was both praised and criticized as truthful, yet too personal, too gossipy, and very often abrasive. Nonetheless, with her ability to "tell it like it is", she became a pioneer of contemporary stand-up comedy. Commenting about her style, she told biographer Gerald Nachman, "Maybe I started it. We're a very gossipy culture. All we want to know now is private lives." However, her style of humor, which often relied on joking about her own life and satirizing the lives of celebrities and public figures, was sometimes criticized as insensitive. Her jokes about Elizabeth Taylor and Adele's weight, for instance, were often commented on, although Rivers would never apologize for her humor.

Rivers, who was Jewish, was also criticized for joking about the Holocaust and later explained: "This is the way I remind people about the Holocaust. I do it through humor", adding, "my husband lost his entire family in the Holocaust." Her joke about the victims of the Ariel Castro kidnappings similarly came under criticism, but she again refused to apologize, stating, "I know what those girls went through. It was a little stupid joke." She received multiple death threats throughout her career. Rivers took such criticism as the price of using social satire as a form of humor: "I've learned to have absolutely no regrets about any jokes I've ever done ... You can tune me out, you can click me off, it's OK. I am not going to bow to political correctness. But you do have to learn, if you want to be a satirist, you can't be part of the party."

As an unknown stand-up comedian out of college, she struggled for many years before finding her comic style. She did stints in the Catskills and found that she disliked the older style of comedy at the time, such as Phyllis Diller's, who she nevertheless felt was a pioneer female comedian. Her breakthrough came at The Second City in Chicago in 1961, where she was dubbed "the best girl since Elaine May", who also got her start there. But May became her and fellow comedian Treva Silverman's role model, as Rivers saw her as "an assertive woman with a marvelous, fast mind and, at the same time, pretty and feminine". It was also there that she learned "self reliance", she said, "that I didn't have to talk down in my humor" and could still earn an income by making intelligent people laugh. "I was really born as a comedian at Second City. I owe it my career."

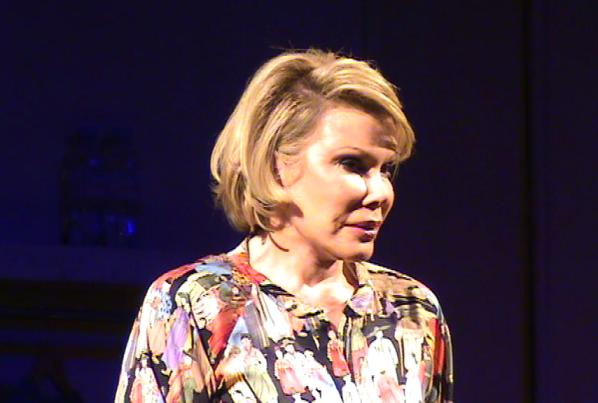
Rivers performing in her show at the 2008 Edinburgh Festival Fringe

In early 1965, at the suggestion of comedian Bill Cosby, Johnny Carson gave Rivers, whom he billed as a comedy writer, her debut appearance on his show. Cosby, who knew Rivers from their early stand-up days, described her as "an intelligent girl without being a weirdo...a human being, not a kook." Sitting alongside Johnny after her monologue, she displayed an intimate, conversational style which he appreciated, and she was invited back eight more times that year. Time magazine compared her humor to that of Woody Allen, by expressing "how to be neurotic about practically everything", but noting that "her style and femininity make her something special." Rivers also compared herself to Allen, stating: "He was a writer, which I basically was...and talking about things that affected our generation that nobody else talked about." The New York Times critic Charles L. Mee likewise compared her to Allen, explaining that her "style was personal, an autobiographical stream-of-consciousness".

According to biographer Victoria Price, Rivers's humor was notable for taking aim at and overturning what had been considered acceptable female behavior. She broke through long-standing taboos in humor, which paved the way for other women, including Roseanne Barr, Ellen DeGeneres and Rosie O'Donnell. Rivers became closely associated with her catchphrase: "Can we talk?".

== Personal life ==
Rivers was one of only four Americans invited to the wedding of Prince Charles and Camilla Parker Bowles on April 9, 2005. Rivers was licensed to carry a gun in New York City. She was threatened with the loss of the license after an altercation with a car rental clerk in 2002. She was a registered Republican.

=== Relationships and family ===
Rivers's first marriage was in 1955 to James Sanger, the son of a Bond Clothing Stores merchandise manager. The marriage lasted six months and was annulled on the basis that Sanger did not want children and had not informed Rivers before the wedding.

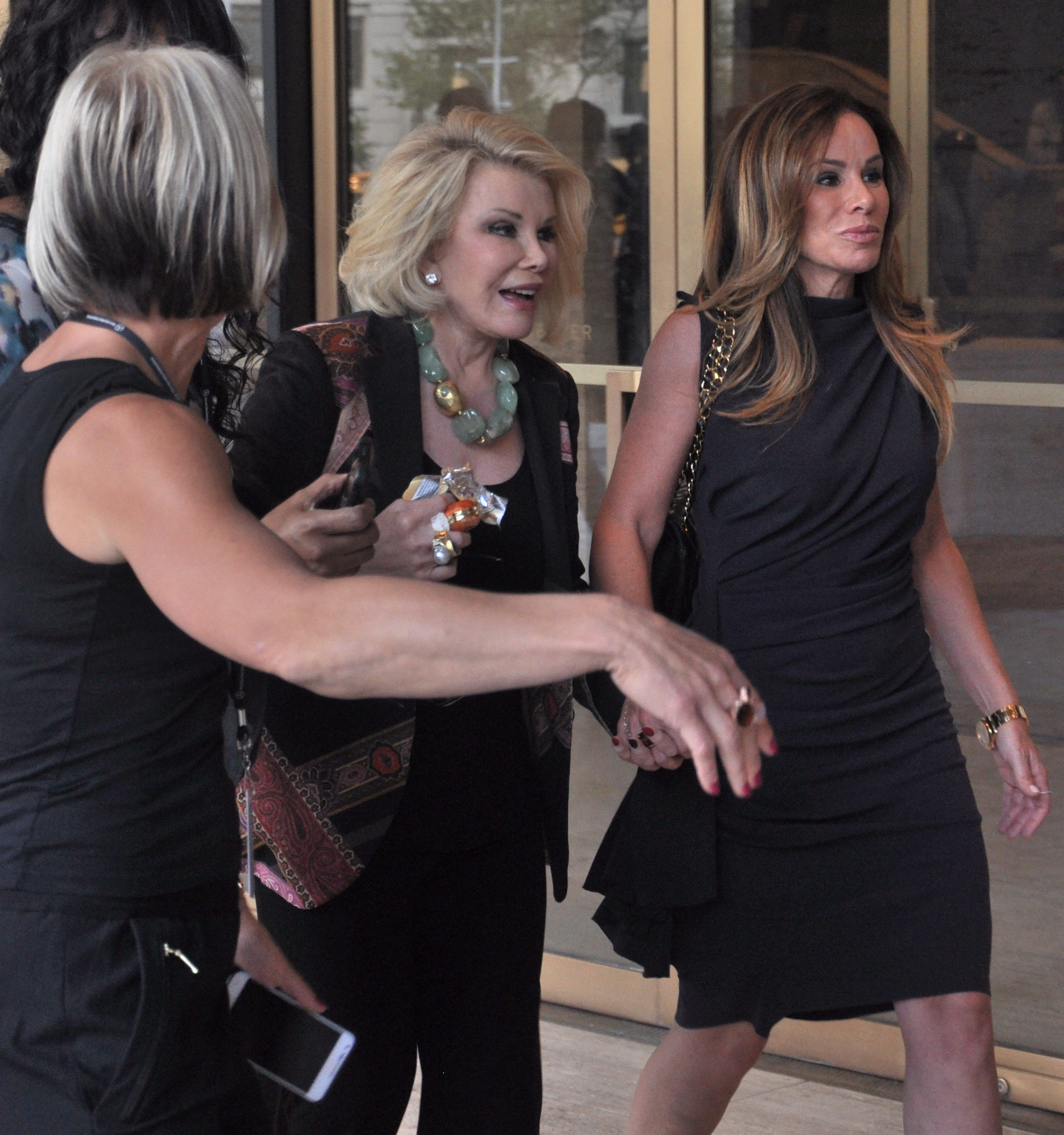
Rivers with her daughter Melissa during New York Fashion Week 2012

Rivers married Edgar Rosenberg on July 15, 1965. Their only child, Melissa Rivers, was born on January 20, 1968. Joan Rivers had one grandson, Cooper, born Edgar Cooper Endicott in 2000. Along with his mother and grandmother, Cooper was featured in the We TV series Joan & Melissa: Joan Knows Best? Rivers was married to Rosenberg until his suicide in 1987, four days after she asked him for a separation.

In a 2012 interview with Howard Stern, Rivers said she had several extramarital affairs when married to Rosenberg, including a one-night stand with actor Robert Mitchum in the 1960s and an affair with actor Gabriel Dell. Rivers was in an eight-year relationship with the commissioner of the New York State Office of Parks and Recreation, disabled World War II veteran Orin Lehman of the Lehman family. The couple were engaged, but Lehman ended their relationship in 2001.

In her book Bouncing Back, Rivers described how she developed bulimia nervosa after Rosenberg's 1987 suicide, and the subsequent death of her psychologist, with whom she had developed a close friendship, of an AIDS related illness. Additionally, Rivers's relationship with her daughter had been strained at the time, as Melissa blamed her for her father's death. According to Rivers, the confluence of events resulted in her contemplating suicide in her California home. "I got the gun out, the whole thing," she recalled in a 2008 interview. "And [then] my dog came and sat in my lap...and that was a big turning point in my life. My little, stupid dog, a Yorkie, who I adored, literally came and sat on my lap. ...and literally, he saved my life. Truly saved my life." Rivers eventually recovered with counseling and the support of her family.

In a 2002, ITV biography, Rivers reveals that she is the great niece (on her mother's side) of singer Happy Fanny Fields. She says that, "(Fanny) was the star of the family; she came over to the United States and married very, very rich and became very grand. But, she was the one person Noël Coward wanted to meet when he hit the United States."

=== Philanthropy ===
As a philanthropist, Rivers supported causes which included HIV/AIDS activism, and in May 1985, she appeared along with Nichols and May at a Comic Relief benefit for the new AIDS Medical Foundation in New York City, where tickets at the Shubert Theatre sold for as much as $500. She supported the Elton John AIDS Foundation and God's Love We Deliver, which delivers meals to HIV/AIDS patients in New York City. In 2008, she was commended by the City of San Diego, California for her philanthropic work on behalf of HIV/AIDS, where the HIV/AIDS community called her its "Joan of Arc".

Additionally, she served as an Honorary Director of the American Foundation for Suicide Prevention. She also supported Guide Dogs for the Blind, a non-profit organization which provides guide dogs to blind people. She donated to Jewish charities, animal welfare efforts, and suicide prevention causes. Among the other non-profit organizations which she helped were Rosie's Theater Kids, Habitat for Humanity, Human Rights Campaign and the Boy Scouts of America.

=== Cosmetic procedures ===
Rivers was open about her multiple cosmetic surgeries and had been a patient of plastic surgeon Steven Hoefflin since 1983. She had her nose thinned while still at college; her next procedure, an eye lift, was performed in 1965 (when she was in her 30s) as an attempt to further her career. When promoting her book, Men Are Stupid...And They Like Big Boobs: A Woman's Guide to Beauty Through Plastic Surgery, described by The New York Times Magazine as "a detailed and mostly serious guide to eye lifts, tummy tucks and other forms of plastic surgery", she quipped: "I've had so much plastic surgery, when I die they will donate my body to Tupperware."

== Death ==
On August 28, 2014, Rivers experienced serious complications and stopped breathing while undergoing what was scheduled to be a minor throat procedure at the Yorkville Endoscopy clinic in Yorkville, Manhattan. Resuscitated an hour later, Rivers was transferred to Mount Sinai Hospital in East Harlem and later put on life support. She died on September 4 at Mount Sinai, never having awakened from a medically induced coma. The New York City Medical Examiner's Office said that she died from brain damage caused by a lack of oxygen.

On September 7, after the cremation of Rivers's body at Garden State Crematory in North Bergen, New Jersey, a private memorial service took place at Temple Emanu-El in Manhattan. The service was attended by an estimated 1,500 people. The guest list included Rivers's many celebrity friends and public figures such as Howard Stern, Louis C.K., Whoopi Goldberg, Barbara Walters, Diane Sawyer, Joy Behar, Michael Kors, Matthew Broderick, Sarah Jessica Parker, Rosie O'Donnell, Bernadette Peters, Kathy Griffin, and Donald Trump. The musical performances included Hugh Jackman singing "Quiet Please, There's a Lady On Stage", as well as the New York City Gay Men's Chorus singing show tunes. Talk show host Howard Stern, who delivered the eulogy, described Rivers as "brassy in public [and] classy in private ... a troublemaker, trail blazer, pioneer for comics everywhere, ... [who] fought the stereotypes that women can't be funny." Daughter Melissa read a comedic note to her mother as part of her eulogy. Some of Rivers's ashes were scattered by her daughter in Wyoming.

After nearly two months of investigations, federal officials said on November 10 that the clinic made a number of mistakes both before and during the procedure. Among those were the clinic's failure to respond to Rivers's deteriorating vital signs, including a severe drop in her blood pressure, possibly administering an incorrect anesthetic dosage, performing a surgical procedure without her consent, and other medical-clinic irregularities.

On January 26, 2015, Melissa Rivers filed a malpractice lawsuit against the clinic and the doctors who performed surgery on her mother. The suit was settled for an undisclosed amount in May 2016, with the doctors accepting responsibility for Rivers's death.

=== Reactions and tributes ===
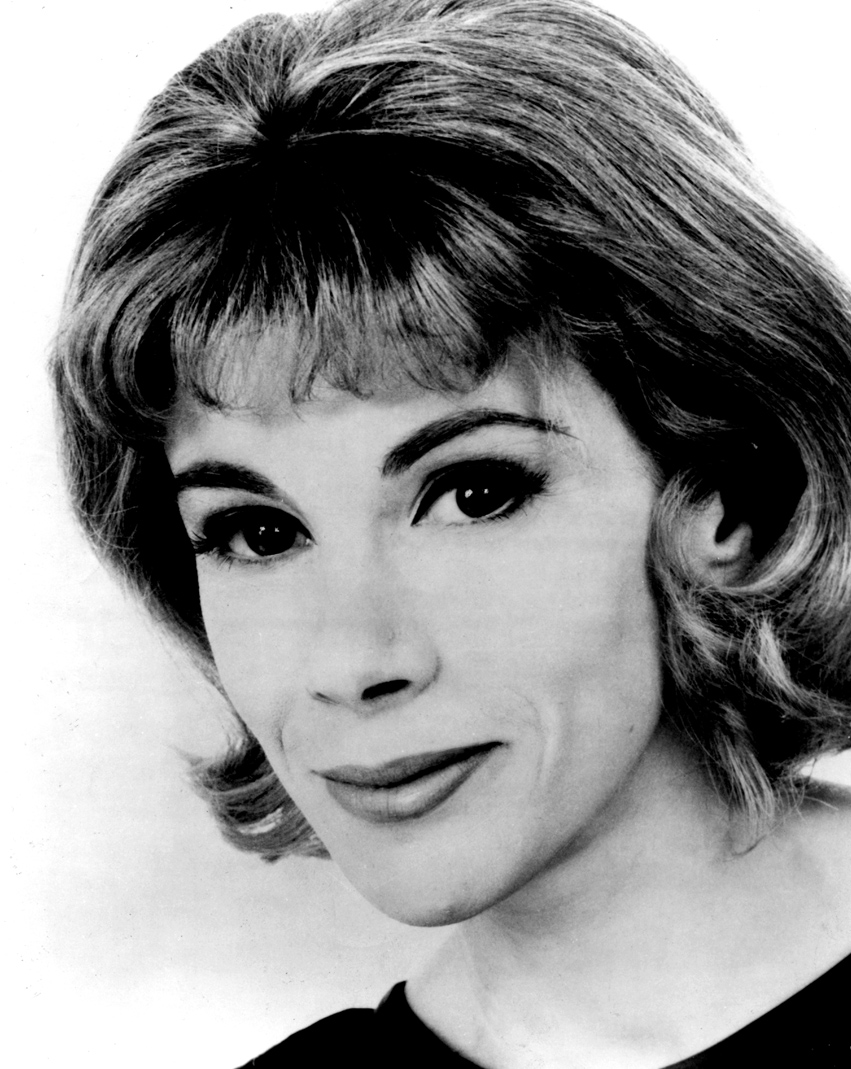
Rivers in 1967

Upon Rivers's death, friends, fans, family and celebrities paid tribute. Numerous comedians recognized Rivers's influence on their career, including Kathy Griffin, who considered Rivers her "mentor", noting, "She brought a fearlessness and a brand of humor into our homes that we really need." Chris Rock said "she was the hippest comedian from the time she started to the day she died". Describing her as a force in comedy, he added, "No man ever said, 'Yeah, I want to go on after Joan.' No, Joan Rivers closed the show every night." Other comedians recalled working with her on stage and television decades earlier: stand-up performer Don Rickles said "working with her and enjoying the fun times of life with her was special". Carol Burnett called Rivers "the poster child for the Energizer Bunny".

Numerous talk show hosts, including David Muir, Graham Norton, Jimmy Fallon, Jimmy Kimmel, Oprah Winfrey, Sally Jessy Raphael, Wendy Williams, Geraldo Rivera, Regis Philbin, Arsenio Hall, Ellen DeGeneres, and David Letterman, paid tribute to Rivers, often including video clips of her appearances. Letterman called her a "real pioneer for other women looking for careers in stand-up comedy. And talk about guts." Conan O'Brien discussed Rivers's legacy with fellow comedian and lifelong friend Chris Hardwick on Conan, while Seth Meyers recalled Rivers's appearance on his talk show, saying, "I have not sat next to anyone who told more jokes faster than Joan Rivers did when she was here." On The Daily Show, host Jon Stewart noted her contributions to comedy: "There are very few people in my business that you can say are, or were, actually groundbreaking talents. Joan Rivers was one of them."

Radio host Howard Stern, who delivered the eulogy at her funeral, devoted an entire one-hour show to Rivers. Stern sought help from comedian Louis C.K., another friend of Rivers', before giving the eulogy. When Stern spoke at the funeral, he began the eulogy with, "Joan Rivers had a dry vagina", a joke that was intended, and reportedly received by guests, as a humorous honoring of Rivers's comedic sensibility. Sarah Silverman paid tribute to Rivers while hosting Saturday Night Live; in one sketch, she portrayed Rivers in Heaven. Long-time friend, comedian, fellow talk show hostess and television personality Whoopi Goldberg tweeted: "My friend Joan Rivers has passed away". She said: "Once again to quote Billy Crystal... There are no words." Comedian Louis C.K. released a statement saying, "I looked up to her. I learned from her. I loved her. I liked her. And I already miss her very much. It really fucking sucks that she had to die all of a sudden." Amy Schumer, speaking at the 2014 Glamour magazine "Woman of the Year Awards" ceremony in Carnegie Hall, paid tribute to Rivers, calling her the bravest female comedian.

Political figures giving tribute to Rivers included former First Lady Nancy Reagan, who said she was one of the "funniest people I ever knew". Upon hearing of her death, Charles, Prince of Wales and his wife Camilla said she was "utterly irreplaceable". Israel's Prime Minister Benjamin Netanyahu noted that besides bringing laughter to millions of people around the world, she was "proud of her Jewish heritage". Donald Trump attended her funeral and tweeted that she "was an amazing woman and a great friend". After her mother's death, Melissa Rivers said she received a letter from President Barack Obama in which he wrote, despite being a frequent target of Rivers's jokes: "not only did she make us laugh, she made us think".

In a subsequent interview with The Huffington Post, Melissa Rivers cited Courtney Love's public tribute to her mother as her favorite, adding: "I loved seeing that outpouring from these women, especially the ones who took the heat on Fashion Police, because it meant they got it. It meant they loved her. It meant they saw the humor."

== Influences ==
=== Rivers's influences ===
Joan Rivers was strongly influenced by Lenny Bruce. As a female comic, Rivers felt indebted to, but also very distinct from, other female standups and comedians including Phyllis Diller (a close friend and companion), Fanny Brice, Sophie Tucker, Pearl Williams, Belle Barth, Totie Fields, Jean Carroll, Minnie Pearl, Jackie "Moms" Mabley, Johnny Carson, Zsa Zsa Gabor, Bob Newhart, Woody Allen, Don Rickles, Imogene Coca, Elaine May, Carol Burnett, and Gracie Allen. Rivers's early comedy in particular was influenced by vaudeville, Borscht Belt, and proto-feminist comedy of the early-1900s.

In the 1960s and 1970s, Rivers was in a comedy circuit with Lenny Bruce, Woody Allen, Richard Pryor, George Carlin, and Dick Cavett. Though she counted them as peers and friends, she never felt included due to sexist practices within the industry.

=== Comedians influenced by Rivers ===
Mainstream comedians and contemporaries who have claimed that Rivers was an influence on them include: Kathy Griffin, Sarah Silverman, Margaret Cho, Whitney Cummings, Chris Hardwick, Joy Behar, Amy Schumer, Whoopi Goldberg, Chelsea Handler, Louis C.K., Roseanne Barr, Greg Proops and David Letterman. She is considered a pioneer of women in comedy by many critics and journalists.

== Works ==
=== Discography ===
Comedy albums
Year	Title	Label	Formats	Notes
1965	Mr. Phyllis And Other Funny Stories	Warner Bros. Records	LP, CD 2012, Download	
1969	The Next To Last Joan Rivers Album	Buddah Records	LP, Cassette, CD 2015, Download	
1983	What Becomes A Semi-Legend Most?	Geffen Records	LP, Cassette, 8-Track, CD 2005, Download	Peaked at number 50 on the Australian album chart
2005	Live at the London Palladium	Redbush Entertainment	Audible Download (2012)	also a TV/video special
2013	Don't Start With Me	Entertainment One	CD, Download	also a TV/video special

Compilation/collaboration appearances
Year	Title	Label	Track	Formats
1960	Adam And Eve / Little Mozart w/ Sandy Baron	Sure Records	both sides	7″ Single
1963	Heaven on $5 a Day	Kapp Records	Various	LP
1963	At Home with That Other Family	Roulette Records	Cosmonaut's Wife, Telephone Operator, Reporter	LP
1970	The Golden Age of Comedy: 50 Years of Great Humor, from Vaudville to Video	Longines Symphonette Society	Various	5×LP Box Set
1970	Ben Bagley's Vernon Duke Revisited	Crewe Records/RCA Victor	Tracks 5 & 8	LP, CD
c. 1970s	The Comedians	Jericho Marketing Corp.	Side 1, Track 2	LP
1974	Zingers from The Hollywood Squares	Event Records	Side B, Track 4 "Divorce"	Book, LP, 8-Track, CD
1974	The Bitter End Years	Roxbury Records	Side D, Track 2 "First Four Minutes: Live"	3×LP Box Set
1986	Kings of Comedy: The Best of the Contemporary Comedians	K-Tel Records	Side A, Tracks 2 & 5	LP
1990	The Best of Comic Relief '90	Rhino Entertainment	Track 5	CD, Cassette, VHS
1991	The Sullivan Years: Comedy Classics	TVT Records	Track 2	LP, Cassette, CD
1995	Word of Mouth: The Very Best of Comedy	Speaking Books Ltd.	Side 2, Track 6	2×Cassette
2000	The Second City: Backstage at the World's Greatest Comedy Theater	Sourcebooks MediaFusion	Disc 1, Track 4 "Our Children"	Book & 2×CD
2005	The Ed Sullivan Show: A Classic Christmas	Ventura/SOFA Home Entertainment	Chapter 19 "Holiday Calendar"	DVD
2010	Fresh Air with Terry Gross: Just for Laughs	Highbridge Company/NPR	Disc 3, Track 3 Interview	3×CD, Digital
2011	The Rolling Stones: 4 Ed Sullivan Shows	SOFA Home Entertainment	Disc 2, Track 6 "Comedienne"	2×DVD
2014	The Midnight Special	StarVista Entertainment	Disc 9, "Comedy Routines"	11×DVD Box Set

=== Books ===
- Having a Baby Can Be a Scream. J.P. Tarcher. 1974. ISBN 978-0-87477-019-3. (self-help/humor)
- The Life and Hard Times of Heidi Abromowitz. Doubleday. 1984. ISBN 978-0-385-29359-4. (humor)
- Enter Talking. Dell Publishing Co. 1986. ISBN 978-0-440-12244-9. (autobiography)
- Still Talking. Random House. 1991. ISBN 978-0-394-57991-7. (autobiography)
- Jewelry by Joan Rivers. Abbeville Press. 1995. ISBN 978-1-55859-808-9. (non-fiction)
- Bouncing Back: I've Survived Everything...And I Mean Everything...And You Can Too!. HarperTorch. 1997. ISBN 978-0-06-109601-3. (self-help/humor)
- From Mother to Daughter: Thoughts and Advice on Life, Love and Marriage. Birch Lane Pr. 1998. ISBN 978-1-55972-493-7. (self-help)
- Don't Count the Candles: Just Keep the Fire Lit!. HarperCollins. 1999. ISBN 978-0-06-018383-7. (self-help)
- Murder at the Academy Awards (R): A Red Carpet Murder Mystery. Pocket. 2009. ISBN 978-1-4165-9937-1. (fiction)
- Rivers, Joan; Frankel, Valerie (2009). Men Are Stupid...And They Like Big Boobs: A Woman's Guide to Beauty Through Plastic Surgery (with Valerie Frankel). Gallery Books. ISBN 978-1-4165-9924-1. (non-fiction)
- I Hate Everyone...Starting with Me. Berkley Trade. 2012. ISBN 978-0-425-25589-6. (humor)
- Diary of a Mad Diva. Berkley Publishing Group. 2014. ISBN 978-0-425-26902-2. (humor)

Audiobooks

All are authored and read by Joan Rivers, except where noted.

Year	Title	Notes	Publisher	Reference	Formats
1986	Enter Talking	with Richard Meryman	Dove Entertainment / Phoenix Books	ASIN B00S00SSBU	Cassette, Digital
1987	Murder on the Aisle: The 1987 Mystery Writers of America Anthology	Narrator only	Dove Entertainment / Phoenix Books	ASIN B074QWM7TD	Cassette, Digital
1991	Still Talking	with Richard Meryman	Dove Entertainment / Phoenix Books	ASIN B01K3J268G	Cassette, Digital
1993	Carnival of the Animals	Narrator only	Dove Entertainment / Phoenix Books	ASIN B074QTYMFM	Cassette, Digital
1998	The Emperor's New Clothes: An All-Star Illustrated Retelling of the Classic Fairy Tale	Narrator only	Harcourt Brace & Company Audioworks	ISBN 978-0-671-04393-3	Cassette, Digital
2008	Men Are Stupid...And They Like Big Boobs: A Woman's Guide to Beauty Through Plastic Surgery	with Valerie Frankel	Simon & Schuster Audio	ISBN 978-0-7435-8150-9	CD, Digital
2009	New Treasury of Great Humorists	Narrator only	Phoenix Books	ASIN B002QUL4UW	Digital
2009	Murder in America	Narrator only	Phoenix Books	ASIN B002E04DH0	Digital
2012	I Hate Everyone...Starting with Me	Unabridged	Penguin Audio	ISBN 978-1-61176-065-1	CD, Digital
2014	Diary of a Mad Diva	Grammy winner	Penguin Audio	ISBN 978-1-61176-405-5	CD, Digital
2015	The Book of Joan: Tales of Mirth, Mischief, and Manipulation	Read by author Melissa Rivers	Random House Audio	ASIN B00UKDY6FW	CD, Digital
2016	Last Girl Before Freeway: The Life, Loves, Losses, and Liberation of Joan Rivers	Author Leslie Bennetts read by Erin Bennett	Hachette Audio	ASIN B01M279XBK	CD, Digital

== Awards and nominations ==
Year	Nominated work	Award	Category	Result
1984	What Becomes a Semi-Legend Most?	Grammy Award	Best Comedy Album	Nominated
1984	Career	Hasty Pudding Theatricals, USA	Woman of the Year	Won
1990	The Joan Rivers Show	Daytime Emmy Award	Outstanding Talk Show Host	Won
1991	The Joan Rivers Show	Daytime Emmy Award	Outstanding Talk Show Host	Nominated
1992	The Joan Rivers Show	Daytime Emmy Award	Outstanding Writing – Special Class	Nominated
1992	The Joan Rivers Show	Daytime Emmy Award	Outstanding Talk Show Host	Nominated
1993	The Joan Rivers Show	Daytime Emmy Award	Outstanding Writing – Special Class	Nominated
1993	The Joan Rivers Show	Daytime Emmy Award	Outstanding Talk Show Host	Nominated
1994	Sally Marr...and her Escorts	Tony Award	Best Actress in a Play	Nominated
2009	Arthur	Daytime Emmy Award	Outstanding Performer in an Animated Program	Nominated
2010	The Hipsters	Maverick Movie Award	Best Supporting Actress: Feature	Nominated
2011	Career	Alliance of Women Film Journalists	EDA Female Focus—Perseverance Award	Won
2011	Fashion Police	WIN Award	Actress—Comedy Series	Nominated
2014	Fashion Police: episode "September Issue"	WIN Award	Actress—Comedy Series	Nominated
2014	Iron Man 3	MTV Movie Award	Best Cameo	Nominated
2015	Diary of a Mad Diva	Grammy Award	Best Spoken Word Album	Won
Source: Note: Emmy nominations for Outstanding Writing – Special Class shared with Toem Perew and Hester Mundis.

=== Other honors ===
- On July 26, 1989, she received a star on the Hollywood Walk of Fame, in the 7000 block of Hollywood Boulevard.
- On March 1, 2013, Rivers and her daughter, Melissa Rivers, were honored by the Ride of Fame and a double decker tour bus was dedicated to them in New York City.
- In a Netflix special released in May 2022, The Hall: Honoring the Greats of Stand-Up inducted Joan Rivers into the National Comedy Center in Jamestown, NY. In June 2023, Melissa Rivers announced that a Joan Rivers career archive (including the joke file featured in Joan Rivers: A Piece of Work) would be housed at the center, premiering in 2025.

== General sources ==
- Colacello, Bob (October 1, 2004). Ronnie and Nancy: Their Path to the White House—1911 to 1980. Grand Central Publishing. ISBN 978-0-7595-1267-2.
- Hoyle, Matt (2013). Comic Genius: Portraits of Funny People. Chronicle Books.
- King, Norman (1993). Arsenio Hall. New York: William Morrow & Co. ISBN 978-0-688-10827-4.
- Nachman, Gerald (2003). Seriously Funny: The Rebel Comedians of the 1950s and 1960s. New York: Pantheon Books. ISBN 978-0-375-41030-7. OCLC 50339527. Archived from the original on September 19, 2018.
- Price, Victoria, ed. (2000). St. James Encyclopedia of Popular Culture. Vol. 4. St. James Press. OCLC 42295812.
- Riley, Sam G. (1995). Biographical Dictionary of American Newspaper Columnists. Greenwood Publishing Group. ISBN 978-0-313-29192-0.
- Rivers, Joan (1986). Enter Talking. Delacorte Press. ISBN 978-0-385-29440-9.
- Rivers, Joan (1997). Bouncing Back: I've Survived Everything...And I Mean Everything...And You Can Too!. HarperCollins. ISBN 978-0-06-017821-5.
- TV Guide Guide to TV. Barnes and Noble. 2004. ISBN 978-0-7607-5634-8.
