= Joan & Melissa: Joan Knows Best? =

- Genre: Reality
- Starring: Joan Rivers; Melissa Rivers
- Country of origin: United States
- Original language: English
- No. of seasons: 4
- No. of episodes: 34

Production
- Executive producers: Tara Sandler; Jennifer Davidson; Danny Salles; Lauren P. Gellert; Suzanne Murch; Joan Rivers; Melissa Rivers
- Running time: 41-43 minutes
- Production company: Pie Town Productions

Original release
- Network: We TV
- Release: January 25, 2011 – May 3, 2014

Joan & Melissa: Joan Knows Best? is an American reality television series that was broadcast from January 25, 2011, to May 4, 2014, for four seasons on We TV. It chronicled the lives of Joan and Melissa Rivers as they worked on their careers, took care of their family, and balanced their social lives with their work lives. The series concluded four months before Joan Rivers died.

== Episodes ==
=== Series overview ===
Season	Episodes	Originally released	
Season	Episodes	First released	Last released
1	8	January 25, 2011	March 15, 2011
2	10	January 24, 2012	March 27, 2012
3	8	February 23, 2013	April 13, 2013
4	8	March 29, 2014	May 3, 2014

=== Season 1 (2011) ===
No. overall	No. in season	Title	Original release date	Viewers (millions)
1	1	"Joan Moves In"	January 25, 2011	N/A
2	2	"Joan Takes Over"	February 1, 2011	N/A
3	3	"Kiss My Ash"	February 8, 2011	N/A
4	4	"Family Feud"	February 15, 2011	N/A
5	5	"Can We Not Talk?"	February 22, 2011	N/A
6	6	"Joan Looks for Love"	March 1, 2011	0.354
7	7	"Home Alone With Joan"	March 8, 2011	0.485
8	8	"Happily Ever After...Joan-Style"	March 15, 2011	0.711

=== Season 2 (2012) ===
No. overall	No. in season	Title	Original release date
9	1	"Skintervention"	January 24, 2012
10	2	"High Times"	January 31, 2012
11	3	"Picture Imperfect"	February 7, 2012
12	4	"Joan on the Range"	February 14, 2012
13	5	"A Very Public Affair"	February 21, 2012
14	6	"Joan Pulls a Beaver"	February 28, 2012
15	7	"East Side Story"	March 6, 2012
16	8	"Crossing the Line"	March 13, 2012
17	9	"Birthday Blues"	March 20, 2012
18	10	"What Happened in Vegas?"	March 27, 2012

=== Season 3 (2013) ===
No. overall	No. in season	Title	Original release date
19	1	"I Kissed a Girl"	February 23, 2013
20	2	"In Bed With Joan"	March 2, 2013
21	3	"Taking Liberty"	March 9, 2013
22	4	"The Big One"	March 16, 2013
23	5	"London Snog"	March 23, 2013
24	6	"Love Comes Knocking"	March 30, 2013
25	7	"The C Word"	April 6, 2013
26	8	"Pregnant Pause"	April 13, 2013

=== Season 4 (2014) ===
No. overall	No. in season	Title	Original release date
27	1	"The Sex Tape"	March 29, 2014
28	2	"Extreme Make Under"	April 5, 2014
29	3	"Dog Days of Fashion Week"	April 12, 2014
30	4	"Pill Popper"	April 19, 2014
31	5	"Turning Tricks"	April 26, 2014
32	6	"Addicted to Daily Doubles"	April 26, 2014
33	7	"Blue Balls"	May 3, 2014
34	8	"Get the F Out!"	May 3, 2014

== Broadcast ==
The series premiered on January 25, 2011, on We TV. The first season averaged 481,000 viewers. In March 2011, the show was renewed for a second season. The second season delivered a total gross viewership of 4.6 million. In July 2012, the show was renewed for a third season. In June 2013, the show was renewed for a fourth and final season.

== Critical reception ==
Season one received a score of 52 out of 100 on Metacritic based on seven reviews, indicating a "mixed or average" reception. Alessandra Stanley of The New York Times wrote a mixed review saying, "Ms. Rivers probably has plenty of fans who would say of this reality series, 'You don't need this.' But thankfully, everything about her unsinkable career screams that she does." Linda Staci of the New York Post wrote a negative review saying, "Added to these uncomfortable, setup situations are some others that simply defy explanation." Ed Barky of Uncle Barky graded the season a "D" saying, "Episodes are one hour each, requiring ample manufactured 'drama' to keep this thing percolating."
