= Cathy Ladman =

American actress

- Occupation(s): Stand-up comedian, Actress, Television writer
- Website: cathyladman.com

Cathy Ladman is an American stand-up comedian, television writer, and actress. She was featured in an installment of HBO's One Night Stand comedy series, was a guest on The Tonight Show on ten occasions (1989-1992, 2023), and a guest on The Late Late Show on six occasions (2007-2015).

She has had supporting roles in Don't Tell Mom the Babysitter's Dead (1991), My Fellow Americans (1996), and White Oleander (2002), and two Mike Nichols films: What Planet Are You From? (2000) and Charlie Wilson's War (2007), as well as TV shows like Mad Men, Modern Family, Roseanne, Dr. Katz, Professional Therapist, Caroline in the City (in a recurring role), Everybody Loves Raymond, Just Shoot Me! and Pretty Little Liars. She was one of the writers of The King of Queens episode "Ice Cubed". She won an American Comedy Award for Best Female Stand-Up Comic in 1992.

Ladman's comedy is self-described as "self-probing, anxiety-venting vehicle" for "exposing personal neurosis".

In 2007, she was featured in the Off-Broadway production J.A.P. - The Princesses of Comedy, which included live standup routines by four female Jewish comics juxtaposed with the stories of performers from the 1950s and 1960s, Totie Fields, Jean Carroll, Pearl Williams, Betty Walker and Belle Barth.
