= Altered States =

1980 film by Ken Russell

- Theatrical release poster
- Directed by: Ken Russell
- Screenplay by: Sidney Aaron
- Based on: Altered States by Paddy Chayefsky
- Produced by: Howard Gottfried
- Starring: William Hurt; Blair Brown; Bob Balaban; Charles Haid
- Cinematography: Jordan Cronenweth
- Edited by: Eric Jenkins
- Music by: John Corigliano
- Distributed by: Warner Bros.
- Release date: December 25, 1980
- Running time: 103 minutes
- Country: United States
- Language: English
- Budget: $15.0 million
- Box office: $19.9 million

Altered States is a 1980 American experimental surrealist science fiction horror film directed by Ken Russell, and adapted by playwright and screenwriter Paddy Chayefsky from his 1978 novel of the same name. The novel and the film are based in part on John C. Lilly's sensory deprivation research conducted in isolation tanks under the influence of psychoactive drugs like mescaline, ketamine, and LSD. The film features the elements of body and psychological horror.

Chayefsky withdrew from the project after disputes with Russell and took his name off the credits, substituting "Sidney Aaron", his actual first and middle names. The film stars William Hurt, Blair Brown, Bob Balaban, and Charles Haid. It marked the film debut of Hurt and Drew Barrymore (in a small role). The film score was composed by John Corigliano and conducted by Christopher Keene.

Warner Bros. gave the film a limited theatrical release in the United States on December 25, 1980, followed by a wide release in February 1981. The film garnered generally positive reviews from critics, and was nominated for Best Original Score and Best Sound at the 53rd Academy Awards.

== Plot ==
In 1967, Edward Jessup is a Columbia University psychopathologist studying schizophrenia. He thinks that "our other states of consciousness are as real as our waking states." He begins experimenting with sensory deprivation using a flotation tank, aided by like-minded researchers, Arthur Rosenberg and Mason Parrish. At a faculty party, he meets fellow "whiz kid" and his future wife, Emily.

Over a decade later, Edward is a tenured professor at Harvard Medical School. He and Emily have two daughters and are on the brink of divorce when they reunite – for the first time in seven years – with the couple who had first introduced them. When Edward hears about the Hinchi tribe, whose members experience shared hallucinatory states, he decides to travel to Mexico in order to participate in their ceremony.

During the climb up into the Hinchi hill country (a plateau covered in spectacular mushroom-shaped ventifacts), Edward is told by his guide, Eduardo Echeverria, that the Hinchi use in their ceremonies a potion containing the sacred mushroom Amanita muscaria and the shrub sinicuiche, which they are collecting for next year's ceremonies. The tribe calls sinicuiche by a Hinchi name meaning "first/primordial flower" in recognition of the deep memory states which it can evoke. An indigenous elder ("the brujo") is seen with a root in his hand, which he asks Edward to hold, before cutting Edward's hand in order to add drops of blood to the mixture he is preparing. Immediately after consuming the mixture, Edward experiences bizarre, intense hallucinations, including one of the petrifaction and subsequent erosion by blown sand of Emily and himself.

The following morning, Edward leaves the Hinchi plateau under a cloud, having killed, while in his intoxicated state, a large specimen of the Hinchi's sacred monitor lizard. He returns to the U.S. with a sample of the Hinchi potion for analysis by his colleagues and further self-experimentation and continues taking it in order to take his exploration of altered states of consciousness to a higher level.

When toxic concentrations of the substance make increased dosage dangerous, Edward returns to sensory deprivation, believing it will enhance the effects of the substance at his current dose. Repairing a disused tank, he uses it to experience a series of increasingly drastic visions, including one of early Hominidae. Monitored by his colleagues, Edward insists that his visions have "externalized". Emerging from the tank, his mouth bloody, frantically writing notes because he is unable to speak, he insists on being X-rayed before he "reconstitutes." A radiologist inspecting the X-rays says they belong to a gorilla.

In later experiments, Edward experiences actual, physical biological devolution. At one stage, he emerges from the isolation tank as a feral and curiously small-statured, light-skinned caveman, going on a rampage in town and breaking into a zoo before returning to his natural form. In the final experiment, he experiences a more profound regression, transforming into an amorphous mass of conscious, primordial matter. An energy wave released from the experiment stuns Edward's colleagues and destroys his tank. Emily recovers and finds a swirling maelstrom where the tank had been. She searches in the vortex for Edward, finding him as he is on the brink of becoming a non-corporeal energy being that will vanish from reality if this transformation reaches its conclusion.

His friends bring Edward home, hoping that the transformations will end. Watched over by Emily, Edward begins to regress uncontrollably, the transformations no longer requiring the intake of "first flower" or sensory deprivation. Urging Edward to fight the change, Emily grabs his hand, being enveloped by the primordial energy emanating from him. The sight of Emily apparently being consumed by the energy stirs the human consciousness in Edward's devolving form. He fights the transformation off by banging repeatedly into the hallway wall and returns to his human form. Edward then grabs Emily's form, and she returns to normal. The movie ends with the two on the floor in a nude embrace as Edward tells Emily that he loves her, which she had longed to hear him say.

== Cast ==
- William Hurt as Eddie Jessup
  - Miguel Godreau as Primal Man, into whom Eddie regresses
- Blair Brown as Emily Jessup
- Bob Balaban as Arthur Rosenberg
- Charles Haid as Mason Parrish
- Thaao Penghlis as Eduardo Echeverria
- Dori Brenner as Sylvia Rosenberg
- Peter Brandon as Alan Hobart, a guest at the Rosenberg's party
- Charles White Eagle as The Brujo
- Drew Barrymore as Margaret Jessup, Eddie and Emily's younger daughter
- Megan Jeffers as Grace Jessup, Eddie and Emily's older daughter
- Jack Murdock as Hector Orteco, the Harvard Medical night watchman
- Frank McCarthy as Obispo, a security guard at Harvard
- Deborah Baltzell as Schizophrenic Patient
- John Larroquette as X-Ray Technician
- George Gaynes as Dr. Wissenschaft, the radiologist who looks at Eddie's X-ray
- Ora Rubenstein as Young Medical Student, who sleeps with Eddie

== Production ==
=== Development ===
The film had its origins with a meeting Paddy Chayefsky had with his friends Bob Fosse and Herb Gardner at the Russian Tea Room in 1975. They were feeling "disgruntled" and as a joke conceived a movie they could make together. They wanted to pitch something to Dino De Laurentiis, who was making King Kong. After discussing a version of Frankenstein they decided to do a version of Dr. Jekyll and Mr Hyde. Chayefsky went home and wrote a three-page "dramatic statement and I have never seen something come together so fast."

Chayefsky decided to write a serious film on the American scientific community and the archetypal man in his search for his true self. A producer at Columbia Pictures, Daniel Melnick, suggested that Chayefsky turn a treatment he had written into a novel first, and he agreed. He did extensive research with scientists and anthropologists. The novel was published in early 1978. As was the case with his previous films, Chayefsky was granted full creative control over the film version of Altered States.

Film rights were sold to Melnick, who had greenlit Network while the head of production at MGM, and who had a deal with Columbia.

In April 1978, Chayefsky turned in his script to Columbia. In June 1978, Melnick became the head of production at Columbia, but under his deal, he was still allowed to produce Altered States. Melnick wound up resigning in October, taking Altered States with him.

=== Production ===
For the final transformation sequence a computer-assisted rotoscope system was created, which produced smooth movements without jitter or objectionable outline. The glow and particles were made on a computer. The frames were first manually traced with an electronic pen and transferred to a tablet. For more complex scenes a high-resolution scanner was used. When finished, a digital plotter would draw the frames in black and white on frosted mylar animation cels. The cels were then photographed on a computer-controlled animation stand. An optical printer added the colors, requiring multiple passes with color filtration and separate mattes.

=== Casting ===
The film's original director was Arthur Penn. He cast the movie, including the relatively unknown leads William Hurt (in his first movie) and Blair Brown. At one point, Scott Glenn was a contender for the male lead. Another key role went to Bob Balaban. Miguel Godreau, a dancer and teacher with the Alvin Ailey American Dance Theater, was cast as Jessup's caveman incarnation.

=== Change of director ===
Filming was to begin in November 1978. However, during rehearsals Penn resigned after a dispute with Chayefsky. Penn later recalled that the only way he could leave the project and get paid for his work was to be fired. But he and Chayefsky remained friends thereafter.

The eventual director was Ken Russell, who had struggled to find feature film work since the box office failure of Valentino (1977). Russell later recalled that "they wanted a director who has a very visual imagination, and they knew I had that."

Russell later said his agent told him directors who had turned down the project included Steven Spielberg, Stanley Kubrick, Sydney Pollack, Robert Wise, and Orson Welles. He says his agent told him he was the twenty-seventh choice. Filming was then set to begin in March 1979 for Columbia with Howard Gottfried as producer. The film would eventually be done for Warner Bros, in part because the cost rose from an original budgeted $9 million to $12.5 million. It would eventually come in at just under $15 million, with $4 million of that going on special effects.

Russell later replaced special effects expert John Dykstra with Bran Ferren, who is credited for Special Visual Effects in the front titles, and created the VFX actually used in the film. Dick Smith worked on the groundbreaking special makeup effects, which made extensive use of his pioneering air bladder technique.

It was the first time Russell had made a film in Hollywood. He later said, "I thought I would hate Hollywood, but I rather liked it. Everyone there is supposed to be terribly materialistic, but Altered States was the first movie I ever worked on where nobody—not Warner Bros., not Dan Melnick, the executive producer, or Howard Gottfried, the producer—ever mentioned money."

=== Locations ===
The film was shot at Sunset Gower Studios, Burbank Studios, Boston, and New York City. On-location filming locations included Harvard Medical School, Beacon Hill, Logan International Airport, Columbia University, the Payne Whitney Psychiatric Clinic, and the Bronx Zoo. Additionally, scenes set in Mexico were filmed on location in Creel, Chihuahua, and included real-life footage of Tarahumara people collecting psychotropic mushrooms.

=== Conflict between Russell and Chayefsky ===
There were three weeks of rehearsals in March 1979, during which Chayefsky and Russell had a massive dispute. The writer left the project and did not appear on set during filming, contrary to his normal practice.

Dave Itzkoff's book on Chayefsky, Mad as Hell: The Making of Network and the Fateful Vision of the Angriest Man in Movies, chronicles the making of Altered States and claims that Russell, objecting to Chayefsky's interference, had the writer banned from the set. Chayefsky reportedly tried to have Russell removed as director, but by then the film was already well under way, and the studio already had replaced one director (Penn). The film's producer, Howard Gottfried, told Chayefsky's biographer Shaun Considine that Russell was polite and deferential prior to production but after rehearsals began in 1979 "began to treat Paddy as a nonentity" and was "mean and sarcastic." Chayefsky called Russell a "duplicitous, mean man."

Russell said Chayefsky "didn't like the color of the paint on the isolation tank. Then it went on to other things. He didn't like the lighting, then he didn't like the machinery, then he thought I was making the actors appear drunk in a scene where they were written to be slightly tipsy in a bar ... There was a lot of embarrassing dialogue, and there was a hell of a lot more in the original script than there is now; it was a verbose script." "I couldn't work with someone else judging everything I did," said the director. "Chayefsky told me, 'I'll just be on the set as a benign influence.' The producer said, 'How do you spell benign, Paddy?' He answered, 'W-I-C-K-E-D'. He was joking but he wasn't joking." An unnamed source close to the film later opined that "two strong artists were jockeying for control and, at a given point, a movie becomes a director's movie. You can't stand over his shoulder. You either support him or fire him."

"Paddy's hallucinations were impossible to film," said Russell in another interview. "He'd write a direction, something like 'Interstellar gas shot through 5 million miles of universe like a puff of cigarette smoke.' But when I read the script, I realized the picture would only succeed to the extent that it dramatized a certain experience common to all men. And that experience isn't gas going through the universe." Russell added, "there is a great deal of dialogue in 'Altered States,' and as I saw it, my task was to make those scenes as visually interesting as possible so they wouldn't be swallowed up by the special effects." Russell said, "I don't shoot scenes as he was used to having them shot in other movies he has been involved in. I try to avoid the covering shot, long shot, close-up technique. Instead, I try for long, fluid sequences." The director said he felt Chayefsky had never "been involved with a director who wasn't malleable. He would make suggestions, and I would listen courteously, and then disagree. 'I can't use your eyes,' I told him. 'I've got to use my own. In any case, there can be only one director on a picture."

=== Chayefsky disavowal of film ===
Chayefsky later withdrew his name from the project, so the screenplay is credited to the pseudonymous Sidney Aaron. Film critic Janet Maslin, in her review of the film, thought it easy to guess why:

It's easy to guess why [screenwriter Chayefsky] and [director Ken Russell] didn't see eye to eye. The direction, without being mocking or campy, treats outlandish material so matter-of-factly that it often has a facetious ring. The screenplay, on the other hand, cries out to be taken seriously, as it addresses, with no particular sagacity, the death of God and the origins of man.

Film critic Richard Corliss attributed Chayefsky's disavowal of the film to distress over "the intensity of the performances and the headlong pace at which the actors read his dialogue."

Russell maintained that he changed almost nothing in Chayefsky's script. "We shot every word that Paddy wrote except for some trifling changes in the Mexican sequences," said Russell. "In fact, I was more faithful to the script in 'Altered States' than in any previous movie, and I think I did it great justice." "We're saying every word exactly as he wrote it," said Brown during filming. "I suppose the truth is he [Chayefsky] and Ken are such different personalities they found it impossible to work together."

According to screenwriter Joe Eszterhas, Chayefsky had a clause in his contract stipulating that the words in the script could not be changed. Russell, "at the height of his alcoholism," was rebuffed when attempting to change the words, and then "began purposely trying to destroy Paddy's dialogue by having the actors eat while they were delivering it, or having them deliver it in a staccato, machine-gun kind of style, so that you couldn't make out what they were saying." Eszterhas considered the direction of Russell to have "destroyed" the script and film, which was ultimately "a critical and commercial failure [...] a heartbreaking experience for Chayefsky, who had fought for decades against that, and for protecting his material. It was such a heartbreaking experience that he died shortly afterwards, some say from a broken heart."

=== Musical score ===
Russell discovered classical composer John Corigliano after going to one of his concerts. It was the composer's first time writing for a film (some of which would later be reused as Three Hallucinations).

== Release ==
Altered States began a limited theatrical release in New York and Los Angeles, California, on December 25, 1980. It received a nationwide theatrical release in the United States in February 1981 by Warner Bros.

== Reception and legacy ==
=== Box office ===
Altered States grossed $19.9 million in the United States and Canada, against a production budget of $15 million.

=== Critical response ===
On the review aggregator website Rotten Tomatoes, 85% of 53 critics' reviews are positive, with an average rating of 6.9/10. The website's consensus reads: "Extraordinarily daring for a Hollywood film, Altered States attacks the viewer with its inventive, aggressive mix of muddled sound effects and visual pyrotechnics." Metacritic, which uses a weighted average, assigned the film a score of 58 out of 100, based on 13 critics, indicating "mixed or average" reviews.

The initial reviews were generally strong. "It's been a while since I've gotten the acclaim I've gotten on Altered States," said Russell.

Janet Maslin of The New York Times termed the film a "methodically paced fireworks display, exploding into delirious special-effects sequences at regular intervals, and maintaining an eerie calm the rest of the time. If it is not wholly visionary at every juncture, it is at least dependably—even exhilaratingly—bizarre. Its strangeness, which borders cheerfully on the ridiculous, is its most enjoyable feature." She also called it "in fine shape as long as it revels in its own craziness, making no claims on the viewer's reason. But when it asks you to believe that what you're watching may really be happening, and to wonder what it means, it is asking far too much. By the time it begins straining for an ending both happy and hysterical, it has lost all of its mystery, and most of its magic."

Richard Corliss began his review of the film:

This one has everything: sex, violence, comedy, thrills, tenderness. It's an anthology and apotheosis of American pop movies: Frankenstein, Murders in the Rue Morgue, The Nutty Professor, 2001, Alien, Love Story. It opens at fever pitch and then starts soaring—into genetic fantasy, into a precognitive dream of delirium and delight. Madness is its subject and substance, style and spirit. The film changes tone, even form, with its hero's every new mood and mutation. It expands and contracts with his mind until both almost crack. It keeps threatening to go bonkers, then makes good on its threat, and still remains as lucid as an aerialist on a high wire. It moves with the loping energy of a crafty psychopath, or of film makers gripped with the potential of blowing the moviegoer's mind out through his eyes and ears. Ladies and gentlemen, welcome to Altered States.

Corliss calls the film a "dazzling piece of science fiction"; he recognizes the film's dialogue as clearly Chayefsky's, with characters that are "endlessly reflective and articulate, spitting out litanies of adjectives, geysers of abstract nouns, chemical chains of relative clauses", dialogue that's a "welcome antidote to all those recent...movies in which brutal characters speak only words of one syllable and four letters." But the film is ultimately Russell's, who inherited a "cast of unknowns" chosen by its original director and "gets an erotic, neurotic charge from the talking-heads scenes that recall Penn at his best."

Pauline Kael, on the other hand, wrote that the "grotesquely inspired" combination of "Russell, with his show-biz-Catholic glitz mysticism, and Chayefsky, with his show-biz-Jewish ponderousness" results in an "aggressively silly picture" that "isn't really enjoyable."

John C. Lilly liked the film, and noted the following in an Omni magazine interview published in January 1983:

The scene in which the scientist becomes cosmic energy and his wife grabs him and brings him back to human form is straight out of my Dyadic Cyclone (1976) ... As for the scientist's regression into an ape-like being, the late Dr. Craig Enright, who started me on K (ketamine) while taking a trip with me here by the isolation tank, suddenly "became" a chimp, jumping up and down and hollering for twenty-five minutes. Watching him, I was frightened. I asked him later, "Where the hell were you?" He said, "I became a pre-hominid, and I was in a tree. A leopard was trying to get me. So I was trying to scare him away." The manuscript of The Scientist (1978) was in the hands of Bantam, the publishers. The head of Bantam called and said, "Paddy Chayefsky would like to read your manuscript. Will you give him your permission?" I said, "Only if he calls me and asks permission." He didn't call. But he probably read the manuscript.

Christopher John reviewed Altered States in Ares Magazine #6 and commented that "Simply put, Altered States is very good at what it proposes to do – luckily it proposed to do very little."

In Ready for My Close-Up!: Great Movie Speeches (2007), screenwriter Denny Martin Flinn called Chayefsky's screenplay "brilliant" and selected Emily's speech as "Chayefsky's last great take on life and love."

In 2023, Christian Zilko of IndieWire included the film in a list of "the 20 best body horror movies", and wrote that, "The film's psychedelic scenes are visual marvels in and of themselves, and a strong early career performance by William Hurt (in his first film role) ensures that Altered States is still highly watchable four decades after its release".

According to TV Guide, Basil Dearden's 1963 film The Mind Benders "is the direct predecessor of Altered States."

=== Accolades ===
The film was nominated for two Academy Awards:

- Academy Award for Best Original Score – John Corigliano
- Academy Award for Best Sound – Arthur Piantadosi, Les Fresholtz, Michael Minkler and Willie D. Burton

== See also ==
- Body horror
- Genetic memory in fiction
- List of films featuring hallucinogens

== Bibliography ==
- Russell, Ken (1991). Altered States. Bantam Books. ISBN 9780553078312.
