= Pearl Williams =

American singer

Cover of Williams' album You'll never remember it, write it down!

Pearl Williams (September 10, 1914 – September 18, 1991) was an American entertainer.

== Career ==
Born Pearl Wolfe, Williams started out as a secretary, but quickly turned to playing the piano by ear and became an accomplished player. In 1938 she went to an audition for a singer as accompaniment. She was hired on the spot and that same night went on stage at the Famous Door on 52nd Street with Louis Prima's band. But it took 14 years and a heckler to make her find her calling. One night, in 1952, a heckler was consistently telling her to get off and that her jokes were horrible, and she said to him, "Oh, fuck off!" The audience howled, and she quickly became a hit.

"What Patsy Abbott? She's not in our class; what are you crazy? Where she belong with us? She's a nice girl."— Pearl Williams, The Cabaret nightclub, Miami Beach, 1961

In 1961, signed by Stanley Borden, the owner of After Hours Records, she recorded her first album, A trip around the world is not a cruise. Known for her bawdy humor and aggressive manner, she released nine best-selling "party" records during her career, including:

- All the Way
- Bagels & Lox!
- She's Doin' What Comes Naturally!
- A Trip Around the World is Not a Cruise
- You'll Never Remember it, Write it Down!
- Battle of the Mothers! (with Belle Barth)
- Party Snatches – the Best of . . . (featured)

Williams is one of several female Jewish comedians (along with Belle Barth, Patsy Abbott, Rusty Warren and Totie Fields) who traced their "bawdy" performance style back to Sophie Tucker. The back cover of A Trip around The World is Not a Cruise repeats the anecdote that when they met, Tucker told Williams that "You're me at your age, only better." An echo of Tucker can be discerned when Williams says in her act, "I get broads come in here, they sit in front of me and they stare at me. Everything I do, they stare at me. Then they walk out saying, 'She's so dirrr-ty!' If they're so refined how come they understand what I'm saying?"

Williams performed for 18 years at the Place Pigalle in Miami, Florida, before retiring in 1984, commenting "I'm tired, I need a rest. After 46 years in show business, night after night, day after day, non-stop, I'm tired". She hung up her microphone for good in April of that year. She lived out her final years in North Miami Beach and Long Island.

On September 18, 1991, aged 77, she died in her sleep from heart disease.

== Posthumous ==
In 2007, clips of Williams, along with those of Betty Walker, Belle Barth, Totie Fields, and Jean Carroll, were featured in the Off-Broadway production The J.A.P. Show: Jewish American Princesses of Comedy, which included live standup routines by four female Jewish comics juxtaposed with the stories of legendary performers from the 1950s and 1960s.

== See also ==
- The Actors' Temple
