= Betty Walker =

Jewish-American actress and comedian

- Born: Edith Seeman; August 7, 1928; Elizabeth, New Jersey, United States
- Died: July 26, 1982 (aged 53)
- Occupations: Actress and Comedian

Betty Walker (August 7, 1928 – July 26, 1982) was a Jewish-American actress and comedian who performed primarily during the 1950s and 1960s.

== Life and career ==
Walker was born Edith Seeman in Elizabeth, New Jersey to Latvian Jewish immigrants. She acted in the original cast of Paddy Chayefsky's play Middle of the Night, which first premiered in 1956, and she reprised her role as the Widow for the film adaptation three years later. In addition to performing in Chayefsky's play The Passion of Josef D, she acted in a number of other television dramas, such as Decoy, Playhouse 90, and The Doctors, playing a patient named Polly Merriweather in Dec. 1967.

As a popular comedian of the 1950s and 1960s, Walker was best known for her "telephone act", wherein she delivered a monologue to her unseen friend "Ceil" at the other end of the line. The humor of this act draws upon the Jewish stereotypes of the "overbearing mother", which had gained popularity originally in Jewish joke books after World War II. While the "Jewish mother" trope gained popularity in newer venues, such as on television, in print, and on comedy albums, notably, she was often personified in these media through her "son's vision" of her. It is also notable, then, that Walker actively assumed these traits, which gave her transgressive mimetic power over them. Walker made guest appearances on The Tonight Show Starring Johnny Carson, The Merv Griffin Show, The Mike Douglas Show, and The Steve Allen Show, where she often performed her monologue to "Ceil."

Walker released or performed on several comedy albums, including:

- Love and Laughter – 1960
- Hello, Ceil It's Me!!! – 1964
- You Don't Have to Be Jewish – 1965 (performer)
- When You're in Love the Whole World Is Jewish – 1966 (performer)
- The Yiddish Are Coming, The Yiddish Are Coming – 1967 (performer)
- Hum-Hum-Hum – 1969
- Aunt Lena and Her Entire Family Circle – 1979

== Death ==
Walker died from pancreatic cancer on July 26, 1982, 12 days before her 54th birthday.

== Critical reception ==
In the 1960 review of her debut album Love and Laughter, Billboard stated that she is "One of the theater's and the movies' top character actresses" and an "engaging comedienne" before concluding, "much that is funny is here." The reception of this album in the historically Jewish city of Newark suggests its popularity within concentrated Jewish communities: in another Billboard article on how radio stations are breaking up traditional news programs with comedy clips, the commentator for Newark's WNTA station noted that record sales in the area for her album greatly benefited from on-air exposure.

Bob Booker and George Foster's album on which Walker played a leading role, You Don't Have to Be Jewish, was a commercial and critical success. In a 1965 newspaper, journalist Walter Winchell jokes that, as "the No. 1 seller in suburbia", "It has replaced the fountain pen at bar mitzvahs." Like her other albums, Walker's humor is rooted in her portrayal of Jewish women who are loud, outspoken, and speak in a drawn-out Long Island accent. On account of its success, Booker and Foster released two more sequels, When You're in Love the Whole World Is Jewish and The Yiddish Are Coming, The Yiddish Are Coming. Walker was an integral performer on both.

== Posthumous ==
Walker was designated one of the "Queens of Comedy" along with Jean Carroll, Totie Fields, and Belle Barth in Corey Kahaney's innovative stand-up showcase The J.A.P. Show: Jewish American Princesses of Comedy. Along with Cathy Ladman, Jessica Kirson, and Jackie Hoffman, Kahaney honors these four "queens" in the show by interspersing footage from their routines throughout her own.

== Filmography ==
Year	Title	Role	Notes
1944	Frenchman's Creek	Minor Role	Uncredited
1945	Out of This World	Guitarist	Uncredited
1945	Incendiary Blonde	Cigarette Girl	Uncredited
1950	The Goldbergs	Mrs. Bertha Kramer	
1959	Middle of the Night	Rosalind Neiman	
1960	Exodus	Sarah	
1963	Violent Midnight		
1971	Who Is Harry Kellerman and Why Is He Saying Those Terrible Things About Me?	Margot Soloway	
