= Devery Freeman =

American writer, producer and union activist

- Born: February 13, 1913; New York City, U.S
- Died: October 7, 2005 (aged 92); Los Angeles, California, U.S.
- Resting place: Mount Sinai Memorial Park Cemetery, Los Angeles, California, U.S.
- Occupations: Screenwriter; short-story writer; novelist; TV producer; union activist
- Children: 2
- Relatives: Everett Freeman (brother)

Devery Freeman (February 13, 1913 – October 7, 2005) was an American screenwriter, short-story writer, novelist, television producer, and union activist, who helped to establish the Writers Guild of America. His negotiations with studios resulted in the guild's right to determine film writing credits. He was the younger brother of writer/producer Everett Freeman.

== Youth and World War II ==
Born in Brooklyn, New York City on February 13, 1913, to Jewish parents, Freeman attended Brooklyn College and began his career writing short stories for The Saturday Evening Post, The New Yorker and the British magazine Punch. After the attack on Pearl Harbor, he volunteered for service in the United States Navy, went through officer training and then was assigned to Armed Forces Radio, becoming one of the co-founding members of the Navy unit of Armed Forces Radio, where he wrote training films and entertainment programs for sailors and marines.

== Career ==
During the war, he had experienced how screenwriters were almost completely ignored by the studio brass and received close to no artistic recognition in movies they wrote. After his discharge from the Navy, he therefore lobbied among fellow writers for the foundation of a Screen Writers organization. In the era of McCarthyism, such efforts were closely observed and met with suspicion. He nonetheless succeeded and became one of the founding members of the Screen Writers' Guild and in 1954 was responsible for its reorganization in the Writers Guild of America. His efforts resulted in securing the right of writers to determine motion picture writing credits and establishing the system under which the guild determines those credits. He later served as secretary-treasurer and board member of the guild, as well as on the board of trustees of the Motion Picture & Television Fund and on the board of the Writers Guild Foundation. In the 1950s and 1960s, Freeman wrote for the radio program The Baby Snooks Show, starring comedian Fanny Brice. When MGM offered him work as a staff writer in Hollywood, he moved to the West Coast and subsequently wrote some 20 motion pictures, including Main Street Lawyer (1939), The Guilt of Janet Ames (1947), The Fuller Brush Man (1948), Miss Grant Takes Richmond (1949), Tell It to the Judge (1949), Borderline (1950), The Yellow Cab Man (1950), Three Sailors and a Girl (1953), Francis in the Navy (1955), The First Traveling Saleslady (1956), Dance with Me, Henry (1956), and The Girl Most Likely (1958). He also wrote the "Burglar" scene with his brother, Everett, which was used in Ziegfeld Follies (1945). For television, Freeman worked on shows like Playhouse 90 and wrote and produced several series, including The Loretta Young Show. He also created the successful television western series Sugarfoot, starring Will Hutchins. During his years in television, he served as an executive at CBS for three years, responsible for shows like The Dick Van Dyke Show, The Jack Benny Program, I Love Lucy, Sea Hunt, and The Beverly Hillbillies.

In later years, Freeman wrote Father Sky, a novel about a military school whose cadets revolt when threatened with the disarming and closure of the school, hoping for aid from a legendary U.S. Army general nicknamed "Father Sky." The novel, with a different, darker conclusion, was adapted into the 1981 motion picture Taps, starring Timothy Hutton, George C. Scott, Sean Penn and Tom Cruise. Leonard B. Stern, a fellow writer who worked on Get Smart with him, said in a statement by the Writers Guild of America, West: "His love of language never went unfulfilled in his writing, and he never exempted himself from the concerns and problems of writers," when announcing Freeman's death on behalf of WGA.

== Family ==
Freeman, a widower, had sons Seth and Jonathan. In 2006, his son Seth donated his father's extensive archive to the Brooklyn College Library Archive.

== Death ==
Freeman, who had been in poor health since the 1990s due to cardiac problems, had to undergo open-heart heart surgery in March 2005. Never fully recovering, he died from surgery complications in Los Angeles on October 10, 2005. He was buried at Mount Sinai Memorial Park Cemetery.

== Awards ==
Writers Guild of America Award for outstanding television drama in 1957 for his work on The Great American Hoax, based on a story by Paddy Chayefsky.

Best Written Musical nomination for The Girl Most Likely at the Writers Guild of America Awards 1958.

Writers Guild Service Award for his decades of work in the organization (1982).
