= Take It from Me (TV series) =

American TV sitcom (1953–1954)

Take It from Me is an American television situation comedy that was broadcast on ABC November 4, 1953 – January 6, 1954. It was also known as The Jean Carroll Show.

== Overview ==
Jean Carroll portrayed a housewife with Alan Carney as her "bumbling husband" Herbie. An "awkward, somewhat dopey daughter" played by Lynn Loring completed the New York City family. Alice Pearce was their neighbor. Scenes were set in the family's apartment or in the adjacent neighborhood. A structure similar to that of The Jack Benny Program had Carroll beginning each episode with a monologue. The sketch that followed typically had her using her wiles to get Herbie to do something. At times Carroll made humorous remarks about the sketch to the audience. Carroll's character was "a lower-middle-class housewife beset by endless household drudgery and a miserly, gluttonous husband".

== Production ==
Alan Dinehart produced and directed Take It from Me. The writers were Coleman Jacoby and Arnie Rosen. Bernard Green provided music. Eleven episodes were produced. The show was sustaining and it was broadcast on Wednesdays from 9 to 9:30 p.m. Eastern Time, originating from WABC-TV. Its competition included Strike It Rich on CBS, Colonel Humphrey Flack and Chicago Symphony on DuMont, and Kraft Television Theatre on NBC.

== Cancellation ==
Financial struggles were a problem for ABC at this time, and when Take It from Me was canceled, the network replaced it with The Big Picture, a military documentary series that the U. S. Army provided at no cost. The trade publication Billboard described the cancellation as an indication "that ABC-TV is on an economy kick", noting that Take It from Me was the network's "top budget sustainer". ABC cancelled two daytime programs at the same time. The network retained its options for the show, hoping to resume it in the spring of 1954 with a sponsor.

== Critical response ==
John Lester, writing in the Staten Island Advance, called the premiere episode "successfully funny". He acknowledged that the premiere was flawed, but said that was to be expected for any new series and he felt that those problems could be overcome. The positive aspects included "good, crisp dialog", "interesting characterization", and "broad and friendly but terse satire".

Bill Coleman wrote in The (Brooklyn, New York) Tablet that Carroll "is tremendous in a vehicle well suited to her particular style of humor". He described Carney as "very funny" and predicted that the two of them "will become the next big comedy team to win national fame on television".

A review in TV Guide called Take It from Me "a good show" and said that Carroll "is great, both in her monologues and in the action scenes". It also complimented Jacoby's and Rosen's writing and Carney's acting.

The trade publication Broadcasting classified the series as ABC's contribution to bad comedy shows. A review that focused on the December 9, 1953, episode said, "The show was thrown together. It lacked continuity, showmanship and the polish an audience justly expects of network productions." It noted that the episode contained three unrelated situations, each of which "could have been developed into a half-hour script. Jointly they got nowhere."

The trade publication Variety described the show as "fluid and funny" and said the writers had "hit a paydirt format". Its review said that Carroll "shines all the way" as the star, and it complimented Carney's performance as her foil, the directing of the show, and its musical score.
