= The Borgia Stick =

- Written by: A.J. Russell
- Directed by: David Lowell Rich
- Starring: Don Murray; Inger Stevens
- Music by: Kenyon Hopkins
- Country of origin: United States
- Original language: English

Production
- Producer: Richard Barton Lewis
- Running time: 100 minutes
- Production company: Universal Studios

Original release
- Release: February 25, 1967

The Borgia Stick is a 1967 American made-for-television crime drama film starring Don Murray and Inger Stevens. It featured Fritz Weaver, Barry Nelson, Barnard Hughes, Conrad Bain, and Sorrell Booke in supporting roles, and was directed by David Lowell Rich. Shot in New York City, the film was one of the highest-rated events of the 1966–1967 season.

The story of a couple trying to break free from a crime syndicate, it was made by Universal Studios.

== Plot ==
A typical suburban couple are actually working for the Mob. Tom Harrison (Don Murray) runs a company manufacturing toys, but in reality he travels the country secretly acquiring companies in order to launder the tremendous profits of The Syndicate. His picture perfect wife, Eve (Inger Stevens), is an ex hooker/junkie who was assigned to him for "cover". When the mob discovers that the FBI is on to him, they become expendable. Tom is given cash from "The Company" (Syndicate), which he distributes to various clean businesses. Hearing that the head of a company has died, he realizes they're ripe to acquire. He meets with several bank executives introducing himself as "Mr. Bennet with one t" and calling attention to his walking stick, its top is an antique from the Borgia Family of Italy, hence the movie's title. He gives them cash, which they put in trust accounts that they control. He then meets with his boss, Alton and a lawyer to review his plan: the bankers will use the money he's given them to buy stock in a company owned by "The Company". With that infusing of cash, the company can now buy the other company "The Company" wants. The lawyer gives his blessing and leaves, and Alton derides Tom for his modest project and how long his next one will take. As Alton says, "The Company" gives him three million a day and expects him to make it clean. Tom asks why he doesn't quit, if the work is so hard. This scares Alton as you don't just quit the company. Yet, he says he's not worried about dying. As he puts it, this is the age of science, they don't blow up people in cars anymore.

Later, Tom is accosted by a stranger who calls him by his real name. This worries him, especially when his neighbor and best friend Hal calls him by the name while drunk at a party. Tom goes to his boss at "The Company" for help. They decide to move him, but Eve won't be going with him. Their marriage is a sham anyway, so why should he or she care? He agrees, and Eve is asked if she wants to stay with Tom. She says no and is placed in a temporary job: hooker at a bar owned by "The Company". Not only is she to sleep with the clients, but also order expensive drinks and then actually be served something cheap. When she can't follow through on her first assignment, she's scolded for not telling the truth about wanting to stay with Tom, and she's sent back to him. At home, Hal and his FBI partner listen to tapes of recordings of Tom and Eve. Hal moved his family across the country to live next door to them and bugged the whole house in hopes of getting information on "The Company." When his son stumbles across the tapes, he recognizes the voices and turns the volume up. Tom hears it, Hal sees him, they have a confrontation, and Tom and Eve flee to his boss.

They're taken to a nursing home run by "The Company." Walking on the patio, they encounter one of the bank executives Tom worked with, and his wife. She tells them he came here for an ear operation and will be fine. His head is all bandaged up and he gazes off blankly. Then Tom sees the man who called him by his real name and figures everything out. "The Company" must have found out Hal was FBI and wanted to test Tom and Eve to see if they were working with him and where their loyalties lay. They're told that Dr. Willoughby will perform plastic surgery on them, but Tom suspects they'll end up like the executive - lobotomized. Just as his boss had said, "The Company" doesn't blow up people in cars anymore, it's the age of science. Once they're mental vegetables, they'll be cared for in the nursing home, which will collect on their health insurance. Escaping the building, a chase ensues that ends in a junkyard. Hal shows up with a machinegun and riddles both of them with bullets. Later, a man with a smoking pipe sticking up out of his breast pocket, which he turns toward the bodies, watches as Tom and Eve are loaded in a van. As it turns out, it's all a ruse, the bullets were blanks, and the two are being taken to a safe house where they'll be debriefed about everything they know about "The Company." Hal is with them and Tom jokingly laments not be bothered anymore for a cup of sugar.

== Cast ==
- Don Murray as Tom Harrison
- Inger Stevens as Eve Harrison
- Barry Nelson as Hal Carter
- Fritz Weaver as Anderson
- Sorrell Booke as Alton
- Marc Connelly as Davenport
- Kathleen Maguire as Ruth
- Dana Elcar as Craigmeyer
- Barnard Hughes as Doctor Helm
- Frederick Rolf as Rigley
- Hugh Franklin as Willoughby
- Ralph Waite as Man from Toledo
- John Randolph as Smith

== See also ==
- List of American films of 1967
