= Jean Carroll =

American actress (1911–2010)

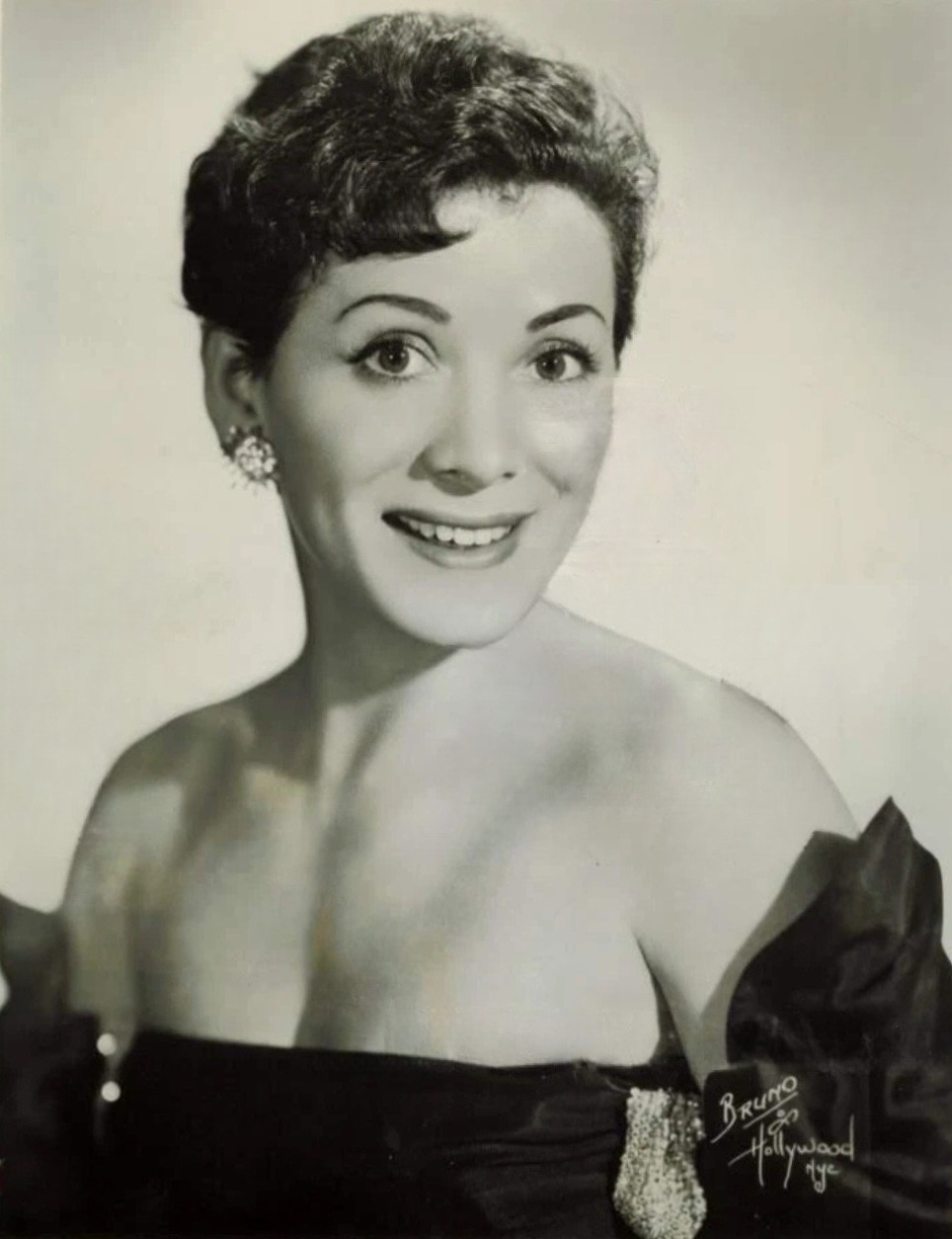
- Carroll in 1955
- Born: Celine Zeigman; January 7, 1911; Paris, France
- Died: January 1, 2010 (aged 98); White Plains, New York, U.S.
- Occupations: Actress, comedian
- Years active: 1949–1968
- Spouse: Buddy Howe

Jean Carroll (born Celine Zeigman, January 7, 1911 – January 1, 2010) was an American actress and comedian during the 1950s and 1960s.

== Biography ==
Jean Carroll was born Celine Zeigman on January 7, 1911, in Paris. She began her career as part of the comedy dance team Carroll and Howe with her husband, vaudevillian Buddy Howe, who later became her manager. She appeared on The Ed Sullivan Show more than 20 times and had her own short-lived sitcom The Jean Carroll Show (also known as Take It from Me). It aired for one season (1953–1954).

In November 2006, she was honoured with an evening at the Friar's Club in New York City. The emcee was Joy Behar and the main speaker was Lily Tomlin. In 2007, Carroll was featured in the Off-Broadway production The J.A.P. Show: Jewish American Princesses of Comedy, which includes live standup routines by four female Jewish comics juxtaposed with the stories of legendary performers from the 1950s and 1960s, Belle Barth; Pearl Williams and Betty Walker; Totie Fields, and Carroll. She was featured in the 2009 PBS documentary Make 'em Laugh. In December 2019, Carroll's career was highlighted in "The Marvellous Mrs. Carroll," an episode of the podcast Adventures in Jewish Studies. She is the subject of Grace Overbeke's 2024 biography "The First Lady of Laughs: the forgotten story of Jean Carroll, America's first Jewish woman stand-up comedian.

Carroll died from natural causes on January 1, 2010 aged 98, in White Plains, New York, six days before her 99th birthday.

== Legacy ==
Joy Behar praised her act in 2025, noting how she dressed professionally, as opposed to the wilder looks of contemporaries like Phyllis Diller.

Jean Carroll's work is credited as having embodied a positive model for Jewish femininity in stand-up comedy, transforming a genre which often circulated negative stereotypes about Jewish women.

== See also ==
- The Actors' Temple
