= The Great American Hoax =

- The 20th Century Fox Hour episode
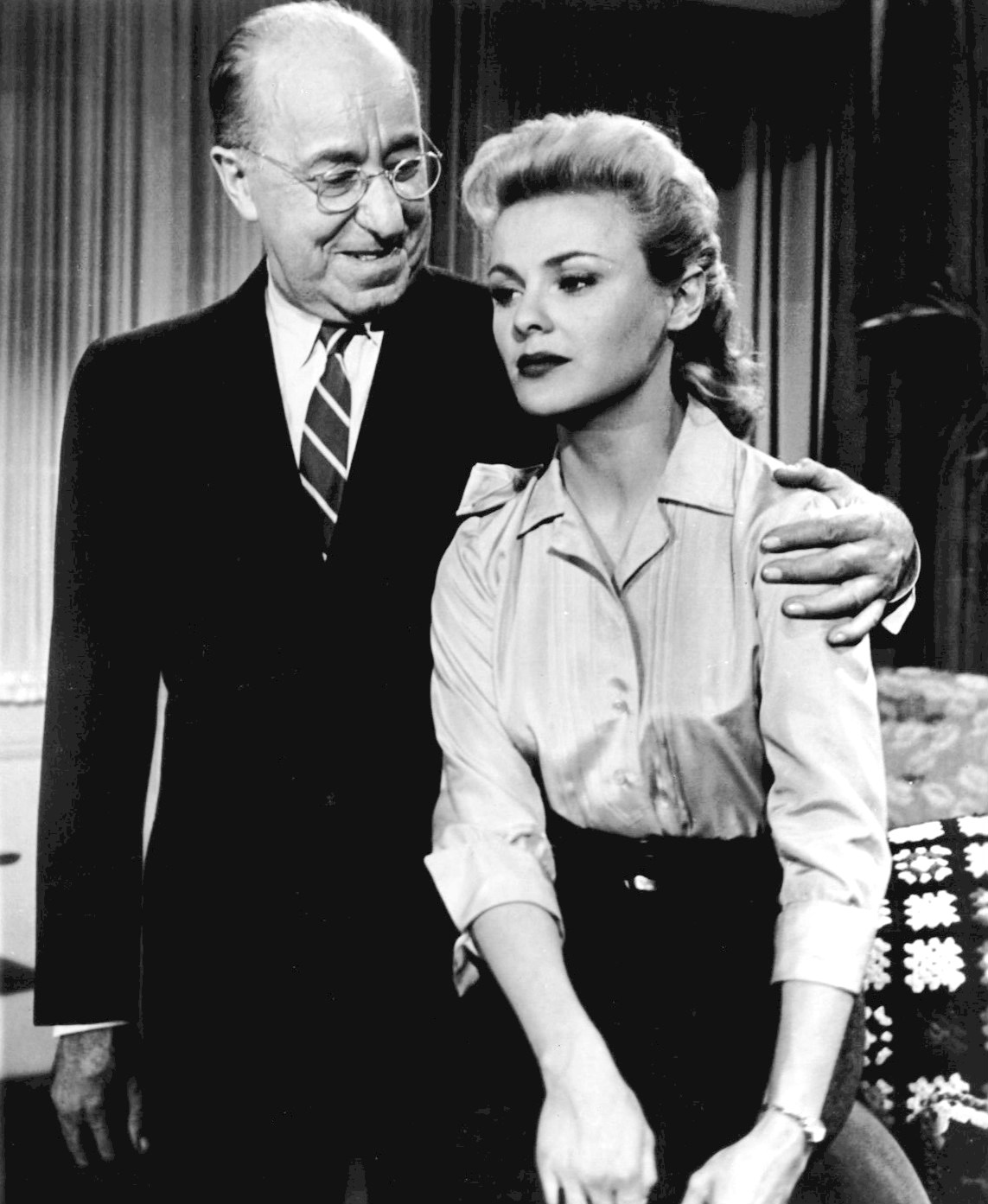
- * Ed Wynn and Kathleen Crowley in: "The Great American Hoax" (1957)
- Episode no.: Season 2 Episode 17
- Directed by: Don Weis
- Story by: Paddy Chayefsky
- Teleplay by: Devery Freeman
- Cinematography by: Frank Redman
- Editing by: Otto Meyer
- Original air date: May 15, 1957

Guest appearances
- Ed Wynn; Walter Abel; Kathleen Crowley; Richard Deacon

"The Great American Hoax" is a 1957 episode of the TV series The 20th Century Fox Hour.

This was the last TV play written by Paddy Chayefsky, and was based on a story of his, filmed as As Young as You Feel (1951). It originally was titled The Age of Retirement.

Ed Wynn was signed to play the lead in a rare non-comedy role. Filming took place in March 1957.
