= The Bachelor Party =

1957 film by Delbert Mann

- Theatrical release poster
- Directed by: Delbert Mann
- Written by: Paddy Chayefsky
- Produced by: Harold Hecht
- Starring: Don Murray; E. G. Marshall; Jack Warden; Phil Abbott; Larry Blyden; Patricia Smith; Carolyn Jones
- Cinematography: Joseph LaShelle
- Music by: Paul Mertz; Alex North (uncredited)
- Production companies: Hecht-Hill-Lancaster Productions; Norma Productions
- Distributed by: United Artists
- Release date: April 9, 1957
- Running time: 92 minutes
- Country: United States
- Language: English
- Budget: $960,000
- Box office: $1.5 million (US and Canada rentals)

The Bachelor Party is a 1957 American drama film directed by Delbert Mann and adapted by Paddy Chayefsky from his 1953 teleplay. The film stars Don Murray and co-stars E. G. Marshall, Jack Warden, Phil Abbott, Larry Blyden, Patricia Smith, and Carolyn Jones. Jones was nominated for an Academy Award for Best Supporting Actress for her portrayal of an outwardly carefree party girl who is actually very lonely.

== Plot ==
Charlie Samson is a hard-working, married bookkeeper in Manhattan who is seeking to advance himself by attending night school classes in accounting. He has just learned his wife Helen is pregnant with their first child. He has lately been feeling trapped in the marriage, and worries whether he is ready for fatherhood.

Charlie and three co-workers throw a bachelor party for fellow bookkeeper Arnold Craig. Charlie is to be best man at the wedding. Others attending the party include Walter, an older married man who recently was diagnosed with severe asthma, and Eddie, a happy-go-lucky bachelor. The night becomes a turning point for all five men.

The party begins with the men watching short, explicit stag films at one attendees' apartment. They then decide to go bar-hopping. Charlie's fidelity to his wife is tested during the evening, and he almost has an affair with a young woman he meets on the street as they head to a bohemian Greenwich Village party. Meanwhile, Helen at home is disturbed to hear that her visiting sister's husband is unfaithful.

As the drunken bachelor party proceeds, Walter feels despair about his personal situation, and wanders off. Arnold, who has become very inebriated, voices doubt about his upcoming marriage. He calls home late at night to cancel the wedding. He then sobers up a bit and changes his mind after a lecture from Charlie about the benefits of married life, despite Charlie's own expressed marital regrets and his seeming intention earlier in the evening to commit adultery.

We last see Eddie at a bar, engaged in an incoherent conversation with an older alcoholic woman. In the end, Charlie decides that married life and his struggle to build a home with Helen are worthwhile, and far better than the empty, lonely existence of his friend Eddie – whom he used to envy.

== Cast ==
- Don Murray as Charlie Samson
- E. G. Marshall as Walter
- Jack Warden as Eddie Watkins
- Philip Abbott as Arnold Craig, the bachelor
- Larry Blyden as Kenneth
- Patricia Smith as Helen Samson
- Carolyn Jones as the existentialist
- Nancy Marchand as Mrs. Julie Samson

== Production ==
In a 1955 essay about The Bachelor Party, Chayefsky questioned the soundness of his original teleplay:

I am not sure to this day where the basic approach was wrong; but obviously the line of the story is six inches off from beginning to end, and the third-act resolution is hardly an inevitable outgrowth of the preceding two acts.... I wanted to show the emptiness of an evening about town, and emptiness is one of the most difficult of all qualities to dramatize.

He then praised Delbert Mann for his sensitive direction which, in Chayefsky's view, masked some of the story's structural weaknesses.

The film's costumes were designed by Mary Grant, and music composed by Paul Mertz, with uncredited assistance from Alex North. The soundtrack featured songs by Irving Gordon and Roy Webb.

The Bachelor Party's subject matter raised censorship concerns. The Catholic Legion of Decency gave it a "B" rating, adding that "only a positive conclusion averts a more stringent classification." The film also faced complaints from Hollywood's Production Code Administration (PCA), which objected to the "suggestion of abortion and the intended extramarital affair." The filmmakers opted to defy the PCA and leave the film as is, resulting in the withdrawal of the PCA seal of approval.

== Reception ==
Bosley Crowther of The New York Times wrote of the film: "Mr. Chayefsky in his writing and Delbert Mann in his direction of this film have made it delightfully amusing and compensating as it flows. For the most poignant revelations of emptiness and fear, they have provided hilarious explosions in the serio-comic vein."

== Recognition ==
The Bachelor Party was nominated for one Oscar, one BAFTA award, and one award at the 1957 Cannes Film Festival:

Group	Award	Result
30th Academy Awards	Best Actress in a Supporting Role; Carolyn Jones	Nominated
BAFTA Award	Best Film from any Source (USA)	Nominated
1957 Cannes Film Festival	Palme d'Or	Nominated

== See also ==
- List of American films of 1957
