= Printer's Measure =

1953 teleplay by Paddy Chayefsky

- The Philco Television Playhouse episode
- Episode no.: Season 5 Episode 21
- Directed by: Delbert Mann
- Written by: Paddy Chayefsky
- Original air date: April 26, 1953

Guest appearances
- J. Pat O'Malley - Mr. Healey; Martin Newman - Boy; Peg Hillias - Mother; Joseph Boland - Boss; Joe Mantell - Linotype operator

Episode chronology
← Previous "The Recluse"	Next → "A Little Something in Reserve"

"Printer's Measure" is a Paddy Chayefsky-written episode of the TV anthology series, The Philco Television Playhouse. The episode was directed by Delbert Mann, produced by Fred Coe, and aired in April 1953.

The script was based on a short story Chayefsky had written in college, which he summarized as follows:

It was about a boy who comes to work in a print shop. He is befriended by a rancorous old compositor. The old compositor has an immense pride in his craft, but he knocks it down continually in the eyes of the boy. When the boy leaves for a better-paying if less rewarding job in a furrier's shop, the old compositor suddenly slaps the boy, revealing how deeply he is hurt by the boy's defection.

The "Printer's Measure" teleplay was one of six that Chayefsky selected for inclusion in a 1955 anthology of his television work. He called it "probably the best-constructed script in the book".
