= Belle Barth =

American comedian (1911–1971)

- Born: Annabelle Salzman; April 27, 1911
- Died: February 14, 1971 (aged 59); Miami Beach
- Spouse: m. five times (including Peter Barth)

Comedy career
- Years active: 1950s and 1960s
- Genres: Stand-up, music

"One time Sammy Davis Jr., Frank Sinatra, and Belle Barth came into the Gayety Theater when I was running it. We had a Chinese dinner together, and then started watching the coming attractions for an X-rated film that was going to be running. For fun we shut the sound off and the three of them -- Frank, Sammy, and Belle -- improvised the sounds to go along with the scenes. They were all moaning and groaning and making funny noises. It was hysterical."

— Adult theater owner and film producer Leroy Griffith, in Miami Beach Memories: A Nostalgic Chronicle of Days Gone By by Joanne Biondi (2006)

Belle Barth (born Annabelle Salzman, April 27, 1911 – February 14, 1971) was a Jewish American comedian who worked primarily during the 1950s and 1960s. She was known for her foul mouthed, bawdy, irreverent humor.

== Comedy career ==
Annabelle Salzman, born in 1911, was the ninth child of a Manhattan merchant and, at a very early age, started performing at Borscht belt hotels and small nightclubs. Her first husband was Peter Barth, whose surname she retained when they divorced. In 1950, she moved to Miami Beach, where she married executive D. Thorne in 1954. Belle worked small clubs throughout the area, occasionally travelling to New York and Chicago to perform.

In 1953, Barth was arrested and fined $25 (US$301 in 2025 dollars) for her act; several other cases against her were thrown out of court, including one lawsuit for 1.6 million dollars, brought by two schoolteachers who claimed that Barth's act had corrupted them morally and harmed their health. In spite of these charges, Barth did not modify her act. While living in Miami Beach, she opened Belle Barth's Pub in the Coronet Hotel on 21st Street and Collins Avenue.

During the 1960s, she performed often in New York and Las Vegas. In 1960 her talents were discovered by Stanley Borden who broke ground by signing her to his After Hours record label. Her 1960 single, If I Embarrass You Tell Your Friends, was the number one record of the year in Quebec. In 1961, she played both the Roundtable club in New York (where she recorded her second album) and a midnight show at Carnegie Hall on November 25, 1961.

In Las Vegas, she played at the Thunderbird, then Caesars Palace in Nero's Lounge. She returned to Miami Beach to play at venues including Harry's American Showroom at the Eden Roc, the Red Room at the Saxony, the Hotel Plaza in Joe's Lounge for Lovers, and Sans Souci lounge. She was usually accompanied by Margie Sherwin on piano.

Barth and Patsy Abbott owned their own nightclubs in Miami in the 1950s and 1960s.

== Personal life ==
Barth was married five times; she and her last husband George B. Martin married twice, either side of a month-long divorce through March 1966. She had no children, but her family included many siblings, nieces and nephews.

== Death ==
Barth became ill in Las Vegas in May 1970, after her final performance in Miami Beach, at Joe's Lounge at the Hotel Plaza, during March 1970. She performed at the Flamingo once more in September 1970. She died at 10 p.m. on February 14, 1971, aged 59, at her Miami Beach home.

== Posthumous ==
In 2000, Sophie, Totie & Belle, a fictional meeting of Sophie Tucker, Totie Fields and Belle Barth written by Joanne Koch and Sarah Blacher Cohen, with some original music by Mark Elliott, lyrics by Mark Elliott and Joanne Koch, appeared for a limited engagement off Broadway at Theatre Four. The show had numerous productions before and after 2000. An April 28, 1996 review in The New York Times by Alvin Klein of the Forum Theatre –Queens Theatre in the Park New York and New Jersey production singled out the Belle Barth section of the show as outstanding:

“If Belle — 'Miami's answer to Lenny Bruce' — is the star of this occasion, blame her defiantly funny, audience winning material. And blame Vicky Tripodo [as Belle] who is having the smash hit of her career.”

In 2007, Barth was featured in the Off-Broadway production, The J.A.P. Show: Jewish American Princesses of Comedy, which included live standup routines by four female Jewish comics (juxtaposed with the stories of legendary performers from the 1950s and 1960s, Jean Carroll, Pearl Williams and Betty Walker, Totie Fields, and Barth herself).

'Belle Barth: If I Embarrass You, Tell Your Friends' (STAGES 2008 Festival of New Musicals) will be presented by Theo Ubique at the No Exit Theatre Theatre Building Chicago Press Release

In 2018, Raunchy Little Musical – Belle Barth is Back! with Book by Joanne Koch, Music by Ilya Levinson, Lyrics by Owen Kalt, was performed at The PGA Arts Center, Palm Beach Gardens, FL.

== Recording history ==
Barth released nine "adult party record albums" of original material. All were recorded live at her night club gigs:

- If I Embarrass You Tell Your Friends (recorded live, Miami Beach, 1960)
- My Next Story Is a Little Risque (recorded at The Roundtable, 1961)
- In Person (recorded at the Roundtable, 1961)
- For Adults Only (recorded at the El Morocco, Montreal)
- I Don't Mean to Be Vulgar, but It's Profitable (Side 1 recorded live at the Roundtable, 1961; Side 2 is the original Side 2 of her 1st album)
- Belle Barth's Wild, Wild, Wild, Wild World! (1963)
- If I Embarrassed You, Forget It
- The Book of Knowledge (recorded live, Basin Street East, New York City, April 1966)
- Hell's Belle (compilation of other album material)
- The Customer Comes First
- Battle of the Mothers! (with Pearl Williams, compilation)
- Return Battle of the Mother!
- Party Snatches – the Best of... (compilation; Barth features)
