= Patricia Smith (actress) =

American actress (1930–2011)

- Smith in The Debbie Reynolds Show, 1969
- Born: Patricia Harlan Smith; February 20, 1930
- Died: January 2, 2011 (aged 80)
- Education: Skidmore College; Neighborhood Playhouse School of the Theatre; Actors Studio
- Occupation: Actress
- Years active: 1953–1997
- Known for: The Bachelor Party; The Spirit of St. Louis; Long Distance Call
- Spouse: John Lasell (m. 1964; div. 1974)
- Children: 2

Patricia Smith (born Patricia Harlan Smith; February 20, 1930 – January 2, 2011) was an American actress who performed on stage, in films, and on television from the early 1950s to the late 1990s.

== Early life and education ==
Born in Connecticut in 1930, Patricia was the younger of two children of Virginia and E. Allen Smith Jr., who worked in New Haven, Connecticut, as a salesman of plate glass. She began her primary education in New Haven public schools and completed her secondary education in her father's native state of New Jersey, where by 1940 the Smith family had moved to the city of Summit and where Allen was employed as a representative for a paint manufacturer. Then, during the late 1940s, Patricia obtained her higher education at Skidmore College in Saratoga Springs, New York, majoring there in English and drama.

== Stage training ==
By 1950 Smith was residing in New York City and studying acting at the Neighborhood Playhouse School of the Theatre, a full-time drama school and the alma mater of many other successful performers such as Gregory Peck, Suzanne Pleshette, Steve McQueen, Jessica Walter, and Amanda Plummer. Smith graduated from the Neighborhood Playhouse in the spring of 1951, and then spent the next several months performing on stage as Miss Tripp in a touring company's production of The Silver Whistle. Later that same year, she made her Broadway debut in the role of Jessica Lovell in Point of No Return. The play, starring Henry Fonda and Frances Bavier, opened at the Alvin Theatre in December 1951 and closed the following November after a successful run of 356 performances.

== Television and film careers ==
Smith appeared in a 1953 episode of Kraft Television Theater titled "A Room and a Half". A Neighborhood Playhouse alumna and a life member of The Actors Studio, Smith appeared in two films in 1957, The Bachelor Party with Don Murray and The Spirit of St. Louis with James Stewart.

Smith appeared in Gunsmoke in 1958, season three episode 18 "Buffalo Man", and again in 1961, season six episode 35 “Chester’s Dilemma”. She primarily starred on television during the 1960s and 1970s, including the role of murderer Wanda Buren in the 1965 Perry Mason episode "The Case of the Candy Queen" and the role of Sylvia Bayles in The Twilight Zone episode "Long Distance Call" (season two, episode 22, 1961). Her other roles included, The Fugitive episode "Goodbye my Love" in 1967 and was the focus of the second Hawaii Five-O show of the first season (1968), "Full Fathom Five", playing detective Joyce Weber. She appeared in a 1975 episode of The Streets of San Francisco. She also guest-starred on two episodes of Cannon including the role of Gwen O'Connor in the 1971 episode "Call Unicorn" and the role of Emily Matthews in the 1976 episode "The Reformer.

Smith was a regular on the 1969-70 short-lived television sitcom The Debbie Reynolds Show playing Reynolds' sister Charlotte. Smith also had an earlier role in the second season of Barnaby Jones, in the drama series' episode "Blind Terror". She had a recurring role too on The Bob Newhart Show during its initial season (1972–1973), played Jack Lemmon's wife in the 1973 feature film Save the Tiger, and appeared in the episode "You're Not Alone" from the 1977 anthology series Quinn Martin's Tales of the Unexpected (known in the United Kingdom as Twist in the Tale). She also appeared on the TV series Highway to Heaven in the season-one episode "A Child of God".

Smith continued to perform in supporting roles on television and in films into the late 1990s. In Star Trek: The Next Generation, in the episode "Unnatural Selection", she plays the role of Sara Kingsley, a healthy young doctor in her mid 30s who quickly deteriorates physically and mentally due to being afflicted by accelerated aging. Her final film role was in the 1997 film Mad City.

== Personal life and death ==
Smith was married to John W. Lasell in 1964. Before their divorce a decade later, the couple had two sons, Joseph and Peter. Smith, who had a "sixty-five year fight" with diabetes, died of a heart attack in Los Angeles, California, in 2011.

== Partial filmography ==
- The Bachelor Party (1957) - Helen Samson
- The Spirit of St. Louis (1957) - Mirror Girl
- Alfred Hitchcock Presents (1961) (Season 6 Episode 16: "A Crime for Mothers") as Jane Birdwell
- Barney (1965) (TV Movie) - Patricia
- Where's Everett (1966) (TV Movie) - Sylvia Baker
- Paint Your Wagon (1969) - Dance Hall Girl (uncredited)
- The Girl Who Knew Too Much (1969) - Tricia Grinaldi
- Helen Keller and Her Teacher (1970) - Mrs. Keller
- Save the Tiger (1973) - Janet Stoner
- Ace Eli and Rodger of the Skies (1973) - Mrs. Wilma Walford
- I Love You... Good-bye (1974) - Gwen
- A Case of Rape (1974) (TV Movie) - Marge Bracken
- Tell Me Where It Hurts (1974) (TV Movie) - Naomi
- Planet Earth (1974) (TV Movie) - Skylar (uncredited)
- Returning Home (1975) (TV Movie) - Mrs. Cameron
- Roots: The Next Generations (1979) (TV Mini-Series) - Mrs. Randall
- Diary of a Teenage Hitchhiker (1979) (TV Movie) - Marion Burke
- The Scarlett O'Hara War (1980) (TV Movie) - Louise Knight
- Who Will Love My Children? (1983) (TV Movie) - Cleta Thomas
- Making of a Male Model (1983) (TV Movie) - Mrs. Rockwell
- Into Thin Air (1985) (TV Movie) - Olga Conway
- Who Is Julia? (1986) (TV Movie) - Marlene
- Mimi & Me (1991) (TV Movie)
- Malibu Summer (1993) - Patient's Wife
- Mad City (1997) - Jenny's Mother (final film role)
