= The Passion of Josef D. =

Play based on the life of Stalin

The Passion of Josef D
- Original language: English
- Written by: Paddy Chayefsky
- Characters: Josef Stalin; Lenin
- Subject: Russian history
- Setting: Russia, 1917-24

Premiere
- Date: 11 February 1964
- Place: New York

The Passion of Josef D is a play by Paddy Chayefsky based on the life of Josef Stalin. It only had a short run on Broadway in 1964 despite being directed by Chayefsky himself and featuring a cast including Luther Adler and Peter Falk. This experience deterred Chayefsky from having his plays produced on Broadway for the rest of his career. David Amram composed acappella vocal music for the play and hired two perfect pitch singers to get the ensemble started on key. Tyrone Guthrie was scheduled to direct but when he became unavailable Chayefsky decided he would direct it himself, his first and last time directing. Many years later, when asked by original cast member Robert Aberdeen if he had any unproduced plays that he would consider having produced, Chayefsky replied, "Bob, I'm not interested in theater. There's no money in Theater." Jerome Robbins came in as a "show doctor" try to help to no avail. David Amram said of the play, "If Guthrie and not Chayefsky had directed it, we'd still be running."

== Original cast ==
- Luther Adler as Lenin
- Peter Falk as Stalin
- Alvin Epstein as Constable Kentinov/ Alexander Lomov/ Trotsky
- Elizabeth Hubbard as Nadezhda
- Milt Kamen (making his Broadway debut) as Kamenev /Grigori Nikitin
- Betty Walker as Olga Evgeyevna/ Krupskaya
- Sean Allen as Ensemble
- Robert Berdeen (aka Robert Aberdeen) as Ensemble
- Ramon Bieri as Alliluyev
- Frank Bouley as Second Sailor/Ensemble
- John Carver as First Sailor/Ensemble
- John A. Coe as Rykov/Ensemble
- Carole Crook as Ensemble
- Michael Enserro as Zinoviev/Ensemble
- Janet Frank as Ensemble
- Richard Frisch as Ensemble
- Rico Froehlich as Brustein /Cheidze
- Gene Gross as Muranov/Sverdlov
- Bruce Kimes as Bronsky/Ensemble
- Simm Landres as Molotov/Ensemble
- Penelope Laughton as Ensemble
- Royce Lenelle as Ensemble
- Michael McGuire as Kapinsky/Ensemble
- Sylvia O'Brien as Ensemble
- Anthony Palmer as Mirsky/Ensemble
- Gedda Petry as Ensemble
- Richard Robbins as Ensemble
- Nicholas Saunders as Sukhanov/Orjonikidze/Ensemble
- Jon Silo Klurman as General Kornilov
- Peggy Steffans as Ensemble
- Elaine Sulka as Ensemble
- Don Wesley as Chugurin
- Carol Wilder as Soloist/Ensemble
- Mervyn Williams as Rusikov/Skobelov/Ensemble
- Stafford Wing as Ensemble

== Reception ==
The Passion of Josef D. was not well-received upon its initial release. Howard Taubman wrote, "Since he can write with tension and power, Mr. Chayefsky has developed some scenes that have dramatic intensity. But his intoxication with the thunder of the English language also has betrayed him into bursts of rhetoric. His careful researching of his subject has led him into long discourses that are not dramatic at all, but oratorical flourishes in hindsight."
