= As Young as You Feel =

1951 film by Harmon Jones

- Directed by: Harmon Jones
- Screenplay by: Lamar Trotti
- Story by: Paddy Chayefsky
- Produced by: Lamar Trotti
- Starring: Monty Woolley; Thelma Ritter; David Wayne; Jean Peters
- Cinematography: Joseph MacDonald
- Edited by: Robert Simpson
- Music by: Cyril J. Mockridge
- Color process: Black and white
- Production company: 20th Century Fox
- Distributed by: 20th Century Fox
- Release dates: June 15, 1951 (Los Angeles); August 2, 1951 (New York)
- Running time: 77 minutes
- Country: United States
- Language: English

As Young as You Feel is a 1951 American comedy film directed by Harmon Jones and written by Lamar Trotti, based on a story by Paddy Chayefsky. It stars Monty Woolley, Thelma Ritter, David Wayne and Jean Peters and features Marilyn Monroe in a small early role.

== Plot ==
After printer John R. Hodges is forced to retire at age 65 because of a company policy, he dyes his hair and beard black to pose as Harold P. Cleveland, the president of his former employer's parent company. In disguise, he takes an inspection tour of his old workplace, with the firm's nervous, mystified executives accompanying him. While walking around the plant, Hodges encounters Joe Elliott, the boyfriend of his granddaughter Alice, and winks at him to subtly reveal his identity. Later, Hodges complains about the lack of experienced, older employees, causing company president Louis McKinley to promise to rescind the retirement policy and rehire all those affected by it within the past year.

Before he can depart, Hodges learns that McKinley has arranged for him to address the local chamber of commerce. He delivers a rousing speech about the virtues of the older worker and receives a standing ovation. The newspapers praise him and the stock market rises on the optimism generated.

Hodges is taken to dinner by McKinley and his neglected wife Lucille. McKinley has his eyes on Harriet, his curvaceous private secretary, although Harriet is more interested in another executive at the firm. Hodges dances with Lucille and she absorbs his compliments and attention, fancying herself in love with him. Back at home, Lucille tells her dumbfounded husband that she wants a divorce.

Joe is unable to convince anyone that Cleveland is actually an impostor. Frank Erickson, his rival for a promotion, and the entire Hodges family—son George, daughter-in-law Della and Alice—all think that Joe is crazy. However, when Hodges returns home with his dyed hair, Joe is vindicated. Because she is certain that Hodges will be exposed anyway, Della proposes that Joe reveal the ruse to the company in order to earn the promotion, but Joe refuses to do it. The next day, Erickson finally believes Joe and tries to warn their mutual boss Horace Gallagher, but Gallagher thinks that Erickson is mentally unstable and gives the promotion to Joe, enabling Joe to finally propose to Alice.

The real Harold Cleveland finds himself in an awkward position, as although the speech has greatly improved his image and that of the company's image, he is unsure of his impostor's motives. When McKinley discovers Hodges' identity and informs Cleveland, the boss decides to visit Hodges.

Lucille goes to see Hodges, but he tells her that he will not intervene between a man and his wife, and that he suspects that she is still in love with her husband. McKinley enters and apologizes to Lucille, and they reconcile and kisses. As McKinley is leaving, he fires Hodges in front of the real Cleveland.

When Cleveland meets Hodges, he is reassured that the old man has no sinister motives. In fact, Cleveland is so impressed that he offers Hodges a job advising him on public relations, but Hodges declines, as he is happy with his life as it is. Before Cleveland leaves, he tells Hodges that he will send McKinley a memo the next morning informing him that Hodges' job must be restored for as long as he wants it.

== Cast ==
- Monty Woolley as John R. Hodges
- Thelma Ritter as Della Hodges
- David Wayne as Joe Elliott
- Jean Peters as Alice Hodges
- Constance Bennett as Lucille McKinley
- Marilyn Monroe as Harriet
- Allyn Joslyn as George Hodges
- Albert Dekker as Louis McKinley
- Clinton Sundberg as Frank Erickson
- Minor Watson as Harold P. Cleveland
- Wally Brown as Horace Gallagher
- Russ Tamblyn as Willie McKinley
- Emerson Treacy as Ernest
- Don Beddoe as Consolidated Motors Salesman (uncredited)
- Raymond Greenleaf as Bill (uncredited)
- Frank Wilcox as Joe (uncredited)
- Harry Shannon as Detective Kleinbaum (uncredited)
- Charles Cane as Detective Rogell (uncredited)

== Reception ==
In a contemporary review for The New York Times, critic Bosley Crowther wrote: "[T]his little picture is surprisingly grown-up and sly about a great many other common problems than merely the one of growing old—about American big business, for instance, and the attitudes of husbands towards wives and how the efficient secretary should act with respect to her boss. Indeed, it is so deft and agile in getting around and about among number of tickling situations that it tends to get ahead of itself, not to mention ahead of the audience, which may find it slightly hard to string along. ... Quite as refreshing as the story is the manner in which it is played, with the whole cast working adroitly as a selfless and perfectly balanced team."

Critic Philip K. Scheuer of the Los Angeles Times wrote: "'As Young as You Feel' has a peculiarly perverted sense of humor for a comedy. ... There's nothing contagious about its atmosphere of sly shenanigans and even Mr. Woolley, who puts great emphasis on human dignity, is hardly a paragon of it. ... Apparently, writer-producer Lamar Trotti and director Harmon Jones were trying to get away from farce stereotypes in both people and their reactions. But something went wrong; perhaps they just forgot to feel young."

== Musical numbers ==
=== Songs ===
Title	Performer(s)	Note(s)
"You Make Me Feel So Young"	Sung by a chorus during the opening credits and played occasionally in the score	Music by Josef Myrow; Lyrics by Mack Gordon
"Russian Dance"	Played by the orchestra at the beginning	Music by Pyotr Ilyich Tchaikovsky; From The Nutcracker Suite, Op. 71a
"Waltz of the Flowers"	Played by the orchestra at the beginning	Music by Pyotr Ilyich Tchaikovsky; From The Nutcracker Suite, Op. 71a
"Temptation"	Sung by Thelma Ritter	Music by Nacio Herb Brown; Lyrics by Arthur Freed; Written for Going Hollywood (1933)
"Consolidated March"	—	Music by Alfred Newman and Cyril J. Mockridge
"The Cedars Waltz"	Played as dance music at the country club	Music by Alfred Newman
"Mama Inez"	Played as dance music at the country club	Music by Eliseo Grenet
"Maria, My Own (Maria La O)"	Played as dance music at the country club after McKinley leaves and occasionally in the score	Music by Ernesto Lecuona

== Remake ==
In 1957, the story, retitled "The Great American Hoax", was filmed as an episode of The 20th Century Fox Hour.

== See also ==
- List of American films of 1951
