= The Latent Heterosexual =

- Original language: English
- Written by: Paddy Chayefsky

Premiere
- Date: March 1968
- Place: Dallas

The Latent Heterosexual is a play by Paddy Chayefsky. The author would not permit it to be performed on Broadway, but it opened at the Dallas Theater Center in March 1968, directed by Burgess Meredith, with a cast that included Zero Mostel and Jules Munshin.
