= Kathleen Maguire =

American actress

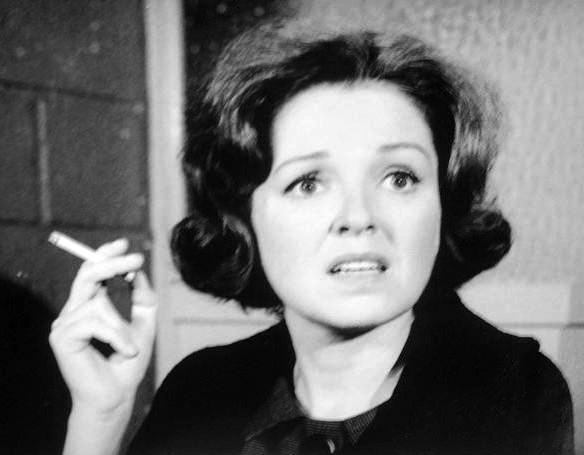
- Maguire in East Side/West Side 1963.
- Born: September 27, 1925; New York City, U.S.
- Died: August 9, 1989 (aged 63); The Bronx, New York, U.S.
- Years active: 1949–1986

Kathleen Maguire (September 27, 1925 – August 9, 1989) was an American actress who won an Obie Award in 1958 for her performance in the stage play, The Time of the Cuckoo.

== Early years ==
Born in New York City, Maguire was an acting student of Lee Strasberg and Sanford Meisner.

== Career ==
Maguire was also known for two roles in two short-lived soap operas on television, first as wealthy widow, Kate Austen on A Flame in the Wind; and as extremely conservative doctor's wife, Adrian Sims on the series A World Apart. She later replaced Doris Belack in the role of Anna Wolek Craig in the long-running serial One Life to Live. Among her film credits are the 1957 drama Edge of the City, Flipper (1963), The Borgia Stick (1967), The Concorde... Airport '79 (1979), Willie & Phil (1980), and the TV movie Bill (1981).

== Death ==
Maguire died from cancer of the esophagus on August 9, 1989, at Calvary Hospital, The Bronx, New York. She was 63 years old and lived in Manhattan.

== Filmography ==
=== Film ===
Year	Title	Role	Notes
1957	Edge of the City	Ellen Wilson	
1963	Flipper	Martha Ricks	
1979	The Concorde... Airport '79	Mary Parker	
1980	Willie & Phil	Mrs. Sutherland	
1986	Alone in the T-Shirt Zone	Party Fox	

=== Television ===
Year	Title	Role	Notes
1949	Actors Studio	Sarah	Episode: "A Child Is Born"
1953	Three Steps to Heaven	Mary Claire 'Poco' Thurmond Morgan	Lead role
1953	The Philco Television Playhouse	Helen	Episode: "The Bachelor Party"
1955	The Best of Broadway	Louise Mitchell	Episode: "Stage Door"
1955	Justice	Helen	Episode: "The Lonely"
1955	Goodyear Television Playhouse	Abby, Daughter	Episodes: "The Rabbit Trap", "The Catered Affair"
1955	Alfred Hitchcock Presents	Dorothy Crane	Season 1 Episode 11: "Guilty Witness"
1956	The Alcoa Hour	Eileen Dixon	Episode: "The Big Vote"
1956	Armstrong Circle Theatre	Susan	Episode: "A Baby Named X"
1956–57	Studio One	Evelyn Digger, Chris Juleson	Episodes: "A Christmas Surprise", "The Furlough"
1957	Alfred Hitchcock Presents	Mrs. Rogers	Season 2 Episode 22: "The End of Indian Summer"
1957	Alfred Hitchcock Presents	Betty	Season 2 Episode 29: "Vicious Circle"
1957	Kraft Television Theatre	Script Girl	Episode: "The Big Break"
1958	True Story	Joan Farrell	Episode: "22 March 1958"
1962	Ben Casey	Connie Dawson	Episode: "Of All Save Pain Bereft"
1962–63	The Defenders	Beverly Moffat, Verna Olson	Episodes: "Along Came a Spider", "Loophole"
1963	The Nurses	Mary Sullivan, Nurse Ayres	Episodes: "Many a Sullivan", "Strike"
1964	East Side/West Side	Josephine Stuart	Episode: "The $5.98 Dress"
1964	Suspense	Betty	Episode: "I, Christopher Bell"
1964	The DuPont Show of the Week	Helen	Episode: "A Day Like Today"
1964	The Fugitive	Nancy Gilman	Episode: "Man in a Chariot"
1964–65	A Flame in the Wind	Kate Austen	Main role
1966	Hawk	Nurse	Episode: "Do Not Mutilate or Spindle"
1967	The Borgia Stick	Ruth	TV film
1967	N.Y.P.D.	Rosemary Haines	Episode: "Fast Gun"
1968	The Doctors	Lila Anderson	Recurring role
1971	A World Apart	Adrian Sims	Episode: "25 June 1971"
1974	The Chadwick Family	Valerie Chadwick	TV film
1977–78	One Life to Live	Anna Wolek	TV series
1981	Bill	Florence Archer	TV film
