= Middle of the Night (film) =

1959 film

- Film poster
- Directed by: Delbert Mann
- Written by: Paddy Chayefsky
- Based on: Middle of the Night 1956 Broadway play by Paddy Chayefsky; Middle of the Night 1954 teleplay on Philco Television Playhouse by George Axelrod
- Produced by: George Justin
- Starring: Kim Novak; Fredric March
- Cinematography: Joseph C. Brun
- Edited by: Carl Lerner
- Music by: George Bassman
- Distributed by: Columbia Pictures
- Release date: June 17, 1959
- Running time: 118 minutes
- Country: United States
- Language: English
- Budget: $1 million
- Box office: $1.5 million (est. US/ Canada rentals)

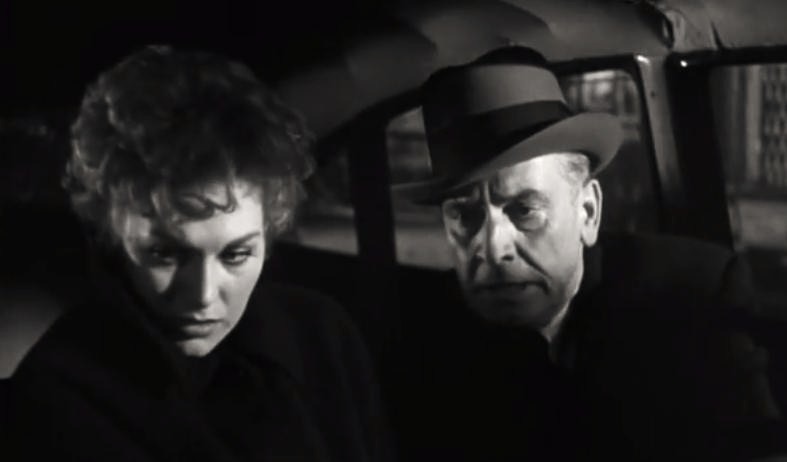
Kim Novak and Fredric March in a scene from the film

Middle of the Night is a 1959 American drama film directed by Delbert Mann and starring Kim Novak and Fredric March. This story of a May–December romance was adapted by Paddy Chayefsky from his own 1954 teleplay and 1956 Broadway play, both of the same name. The film was entered into the 1959 Cannes Film Festival, where it competed for the Palme d'Or, and was released by Columbia Pictures.

== Plot ==
Emotionally distraught, Betty Preisser, a 24-year-old receptionist for a New York City clothing manufacturer, leaves work early, taking some typing to finish at home. Her boss, Jerry Kingsley, a widower of 56 who lives with his spinster older sister Evelyn, needs the document she took, so he drops by the apartment Betty shares with her mother and younger sister to pick it up. Although they are professional, rather than personal, acquaintances, Betty ends up telling Jerry all about her loveless marriage to her musician ex-husband, George, who called her the previous night to say he wants to get back together. Jerry, who has a married daughter, Lillian, about Betty's age, listens attentively to Betty's story and gives her some fatherly advice, which, her own father having walked out on her family when she was young, helps cheer her up.

After this encounter, Jerry begins to feel other-than-fatherly feelings for Betty, and he eventually works up the nerve to invite her to dinner. Though Betty tries to end the relationship several times, saying she does not want to hurt Jerry, Jerry is always able to talk her through these periods, and they continue to see each other.

As they get more serious about each other, both Jerry and Betty are nervous about how their friends and relations will respond to their May–December romance, and, as they feared, the females in their lives, in particular, disapprove of the relationship. Betty's mother calls Jerry a "dirty old man" the first time they meet, Betty's friend Marilyn tries to convince Betty to get back together with George, Evelyn calls Betty a "fortune hunter" and Jerry a fool, and, when Lillian's husband Jack offers Jerry his congratulations, Lillian tells him to mind his own business. However, Jerry's business partner Walter Lockman, who is trapped in a long and unhappy marriage and spends his time chasing after young "tootsies", urges Jerry pursue any chance at happiness.

One night, Betty comes home after arguing with Jerry about his growing jealousy to find George waiting for her. Her mother and sister excuse themselves, and George tries to persuade Betty to return to him. In a moment of weakness, Betty gives in, and they have a romantic tryst, but she regrets it and tells Jerry what happened the next day, explaining that it meant nothing to her emotionally. Jerry feels humiliated and hurt, however, and says he no longer wants to see Betty.

Evelyn observes how depressed Jerry is when he returns home and tries to talk with him, but he says he does not want her to see him in the state he is in. The phone rings, and Walter's wife tells Jerry that Walter just called her from a hotel, saying he is going to kill himself. Dealing with this crisis makes Jerry's feelings clear to himself, and he decides to take Walter's advice and pursue what makes him feel alive. Jerry goes to Betty and tells her that he loves her, and they embrace.

== Cast ==
- Kim Novak as Betty Preisser (née Mueller), a young receptionist at Lock Lee Inc. Fashions
- Fredric March as Jerry Kingsley, one of the owners of Lock Lee
- Glenda Farrell as Mrs. Mueller, Betty and Alice's mother
- Albert Dekker as Walter Lockman, Jerry's partner in Lock Lee
- Martin Balsam as Jack Englander, Lillian's husband
- Lee Grant as Marilyn, Betty's friend
- Lee Philips as George Preisser, Betty's ex-husband
- Edith Meiser as Evelyn Kingsley, Jerry's older sister
- Joan Copeland as Lillian Englander, Jerry's daughter
- Betty Walker as Rosalind Neiman, a widow Evelyn tries to set up with Jerry
- Lou Gilbert as Sherman, who discusses aging and mortality with Jerry and Gould
- Rudy Bond as Louis Gould, who discusses aging and mortality with Jerry and Sherman
- Effie Afton as Mrs. Carroll, Mrs. Mueller's friend and neighbor
- Jan Norris as Alice Mueller, Betty's younger sister
- David Ford as Paul Kingsley, Jerry's son
- Audrey Peters as Elizabeth Kingsley, Paul's wife
- Dora Weissman as Lucy Lockman, Walter's wife
- Lee Richardson as Joey Lockman, Walter's son
- Anna Berger as Caroline, the head secretary at Lock Lee

== TV play ==
Middle of the Night first appeared as an episode of The Philco-Goodyear Television Playhouse that aired on September 19, 1954, also written by Paddy Chayefsky and directed by Delbert Mann, but starring E. G. Marshall and Eva Marie Saint in the lead roles.

== Stage play ==
Chayefsky adapted his teleplay as a stage play that premiered in 1956. Joshua Logan was so impressed by Chayefsky's writing that he agreed to direct the play when only the first two acts were written. Edward G. Robinson and Gena Rowlands appeared in the lead roles during the play's initial run, which was successful and ran for over a year on Broadway. Logan later criticized the film adaptation in his memoir Movie Stars, Real People, and Me (1978), writing that he felt Chayefsky, who he said "controlled everything", turned the story into a "goy play" for the screen, and saying that March and Novak were not as effective in their roles as Robinson and Rowlands had been.

== Production ==
Although the leads were recast for the film, Martin Balsam, Lee Philips, Betty Walker, and Effie Afton reprised their stage roles on screen. Frank Thompson designed the costumes for the film. Previously, Mann had worked with Chayefsky on Marty (1955) and The Bachelor Party (1957)

== Reception ==
In a mixed, but approving, review for The New York Times, Bosley Crowther wrote that the film "fitly" brought Chayefsky's play to the screen, but found it bleaker than the play, which he said had touches of ethnic humor that the film does not:

The characters are more intense and driven by their lonely and neurotic moods [than they are in the play]. They fumble and paw at each other in a more avid and frenzied way, and their squabbles and indecisions are more violent and sweaty with pain. Mr. Chayefsky and Delbert Mann, the director, have worked for the taut, dramatic thing. They haven't wasted much time on humor. This is loneliness, boy, and it is grim. But something that was quite attractive on the stage is not in the film. That is the humor and the temperament of a particular ethnic group. Mr. March is an excellent actor when it comes to showing joy and distress but he isn't successful at pretending to be a Jewish papa and business man.

== Awards ==
- 1959 Cannes Film Festival: Palme d'Or – nominated
- 17th Golden Globe Awards: Best Actor – Drama (Fredric March) – nominated
- National Board of Review: Top Ten Films of 1959
