= The Sixth Year =

- The Philco Television Playhouse episode
- Episode no.: Season 6 Episode 6
- Directed by: Arthur Penn
- Written by: Paddy Chayefsky
- Original air date: November 26, 1953

Guest appearances
- Kim Stanley; Warren Stevens; Kathleen Comegys

"The Sixth Year" is an episode of the TV anthology series The Philco Television Playhouse. It was written by Paddy Chayefsky, directed by Arthur Penn and stars Kim Stanley.

== Plot ==
A wife becomes exasperated with her husband who seems to have lost the will to work. She takes their child and leaves. He finds a menial job and asks her to come home. She seeks advice on the situation from her mother and father.

== Reception ==
The TV critic from the Christian Science Monitor wrote that "Mr Chayefsky's humanity operates to assist an understanding of even the unsympathetic mother. Kim Stanley portrayed the young wife with the subtle responsiveness and controlled emotional power that assist intimacy in television acting."
