= The Bachelor Party (The Philco Television Playhouse) =

1953 teleplay by Paddy Chayefsky

- The Philco Television Playhouse episode
- Episode no.: Season 6 Episode 2
- Directed by: Delbert Mann
- Written by: Paddy Chayefsky
- Original air date: October 11, 1953

Guest appearances
- Eddie Albert as Charlie; Kathleen Maguire as Helen; Bob Emmett as Kenneth; James Westerfield as The Bookkeeper; Joseph Mantell as The Bachelor; Douglas Gordon as The Groom; Olive Dunbar as The Fiancée

Episode chronology
← Previous "0 for 37"	Next → "The Girl with the Stop Watch"

"The Bachelor Party" is a Paddy Chayefsky-written episode of the TV anthology series, The Philco Television Playhouse. The live broadcast starring Eddie Albert was aired on October 11, 1953; it was directed by Delbert Mann and produced by Fred Coe.

== Description ==
The story centers on a group of accountants holding a bachelor party for Arnold, a soon-to-be-wed friend and co-worker. On the morning of the party, the lead character, Charlie, learns from his wife Helen that she is pregnant with their first child. Although outwardly happy with the news, he has been feeling trapped lately, and the prospect of imminent fatherhood contributes to that feeling. The other party attendees are also young married men like Charlie, with the exception of Eddie Watkins, known as "The Bachelor". He is a boastful free spirit who is envied by the others for his presumed sexual exploits.

As the men go bar-hopping, Charlie ogles an attractive woman, and the audience realizes he is contemplating adultery. The party devolves into a drunken affair in which the men reflect on their own lives, and confess their hopes and fears. The Bachelor is revealed to be not as swinging or enviable as previously believed. Charlie escorts home the very inebriated groom, and then returns to his own apartment where he recognizes that his marriage to Helen is what he values most.

In an essay on the writing and production of "The Bachelor Party", Chayefsky stated, "I wanted to show the emptiness of an evening about town, and emptiness is one of the most difficult of all qualities to dramatize." He felt the script had "holes in it":

I am not sure to this day where the basic approach was wrong; but obviously the line of the story is six inches off from beginning to end, and the third-act resolution is hardly an inevitable outgrowth of the preceding two acts.

Despite these criticisms, he attributed the show's excellent reception to the sensitive direction by Delbert Mann, and the strength of the acting, particularly by Eddie Albert.

== Aftermath ==
"The Bachelor Party" teleplay was one of six that Chayefsky selected for inclusion in a 1955 anthology of his television work.

After its TV broadcast, the story was adapted by Chayefsky into a 1957 feature film also titled The Bachelor Party, but it was not nearly as successful as his prior film adaptation of Marty.
