= Mad as Hell: The Making of Network and the Fateful Vision of the Angriest Man in Movies =

Book about Network (1976 film)

- Author: Dave Itzkoff
- Language: English
- Publication date: 2014

Mad as Hell: The Making of Network and the Fateful Vision of the Angriest Man in Movies is a 2014 book by Dave Itzkoff, published by Times/Henry Holt.

It is an analysis of Network, a 1976 film. The book also has information on the principal people involved in the film.

Rob Lowe of The New York Times described the work as "an inspiring, conflict-driven account of the" creation of a film.

== Background ==
Itzkoff used the writings of Paddy Chayefsky (the screenwriter of Network), interviews, and documentation from the filming as sources. People interviewed include Anderson Cooper, Stephen Colbert, and Bill O'Reilly.

== Reception ==
Ted Koppel stated that the book "is elegantly executed"; Koppel did not see as much reasoning in the book on the reasons why the film was made, while he found more information on how the creation was done. He concluded that the author "is right to give Paddy Chayefsky his due as a cultural icon."

Kirkus Reviews described the book as "solid" and that people who enjoy the film would deem the work "irresistible"; the magazine stated that people who were not fans of Network may not be "convinced by Itzkoff’s case for Network’s prescience and cultural significance".

Publishers Weekly wrote that the author's "chilling analysis of Network as prophecy" was "real achievement" of the author.
