= Paddy Chayefsky =

American playwright, screenwriter and novelist (1923–1981)

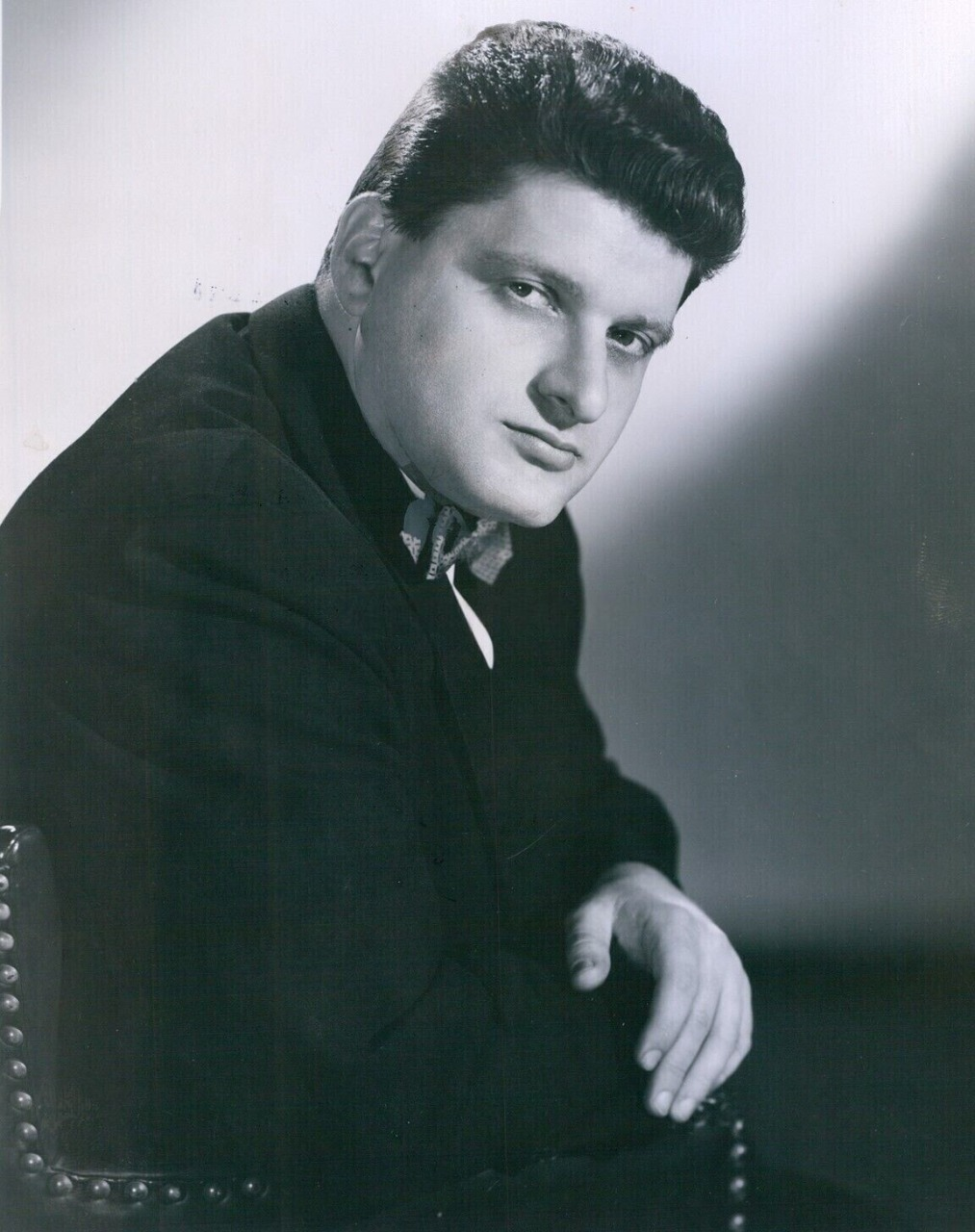
- Chayefsky in 1956
- Born: Sidney Aaron Chayefsky; January 29, 1923; New York City, U.S.
- Died: August 1, 1981 (aged 58); New York City, U.S.
- Resting place: Kensico Cemetery, Valhalla, New York
- Education: City College of New York (1943)
- Occupations: Playwright; novelist; screenwriter
- Years active: 1944–1980
- Spouse: Susan Sackler Chayefsky (m. 1949)
- Children: 1

Sidney Aaron "Paddy" Chayefsky (/ˌtʃaɪˈ(j)ɛfski/; January 29, 1923 – August 1, 1981) was an American playwright and screenwriter. He is the only person to have won three solo Academy Awards for writing both Adapted and Original screenplays.

He was one of the most renowned dramatists of the Golden Age of Television. His intimate, realistic scripts provided a naturalistic style of television drama for the 1950s, dramatizing the lives of ordinary Americans. Martin Gottfried wrote in All His Jazz that Chayefsky was "the most successful graduate of television's slice of life school of naturalism."

Following his critically acclaimed teleplays, Chayefsky became a noted playwright and screenwriter. As a screenwriter, he received three Academy Awards for Marty (1955), The Hospital (1971) and Network (1976). The movie Marty was based on his own television drama about two lonely people finding love. Network was a satire of the television industry and The Hospital was also satiric. Film historian David Thomson called The Hospital "years ahead of its time. … Few films capture the disaster of America's self-destructive idealism so well." His screenplay for Network is often regarded as his masterpiece, and has been hailed as "the kind of literate, darkly funny and breathtakingly prescient material that prompts many to claim it as the greatest screenplay of the 20th century."

Chayefsky's early stories were frequently influenced by the author's childhood in The Bronx. Chayefsky was part of the inaugural class of inductees into the Academy of Television Arts & Sciences' Television Hall of Fame. He received this honor three years after his death, in 1984.

== Early life ==
Sidney Aaron Chayefsky was born in the Bronx, New York City, to Russian-Jewish immigrants Harry and Gussie (Stuchevsky) Chayefsky. Harry Chayefsky's father served for twenty-five years in the Russian army so the family was allowed to live in Moscow, while Gussie Stuchevsky lived in a village near Odessa. Harry and Gussie emigrated to the United States in 1907 and 1909 respectively.

Harry Chayefsky worked for a New Jersey milk distribution company in which he eventually took a controlling interest and renamed Dellwood Dairies. The family lived in Perth Amboy, New Jersey, and Mount Vernon, New York, moving temporarily to Bailey Avenue in the West Bronx at the time of Sidney Chayefsky's birth while a larger house in Mount Vernon was being completed. He had two older brothers, William and Winn.

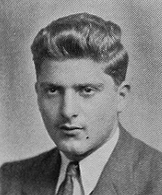
Chayefsky as a senior in high school, 1939

As a toddler, Chayefsky showed signs of being gifted, and could "speak intelligently" at two and a half. His father suffered a financial reversal during the Wall Street Crash of 1929, and the family moved back to the Bronx. Chayefsky attended a public elementary school. As a boy, Chayefsky was noted for his verbal ability, which won him friends. He attended DeWitt Clinton High School, where he served as editor of the school's literary magazine The Magpie. He graduated from Clinton in 1939 at age 16 and attended the City College of New York, graduating with a degree in social sciences in 1943. While at City College he played for the semi-professional football team Kingsbridge Trojans. He studied languages at Fordham University during his Army service.

=== Military service ===
In 1943, two weeks before his graduation from City College, Chayefsky was drafted into the United States Army, and served in combat in Europe. While in the Army he adopted the nickname "Paddy." The nickname was given spontaneously when he was awakened at dawn for kitchen duty. Although actually Jewish, he asked to be excused to attend Mass. "Sure you do, Paddy," said the officer, and the name stuck.

Chayefsky was wounded by a land mine while serving with the 104th Infantry Division in the European Theatre near Aachen, Germany. He was awarded the Purple Heart. The wound left him badly scarred, contributing to his shyness around women. While recovering from his injuries in the Army Hospital near Cirencester, England, he wrote the book and lyrics to a musical comedy, No T.O. for Love. First produced in 1945 by the Special Services Unit, the show toured European Army bases for two years.

The London opening of No T.O. for Love at the Scala Theatre in the West End was the beginning of Chayefsky's theatrical career. During the London production of this musical, Chayefsky encountered Joshua Logan, a future collaborator, and Garson Kanin, who invited Chayefsky to collaborate with him on a documentary of the Allied invasion, The True Glory.

== Career ==
=== 1940s ===
Returning to the United States, Chayefsky worked in his uncle's print shop, Regal Press, an experience which provided a background for his later teleplay, Printer's Measure (1953), as well as his story for the movie As Young as You Feel (1951). Kanin enabled Chayefsky to spend time working on his second play, Put Them All Together (later known as M is for Mother), but it was never produced. Producers Mike Gordon and Jerry Bressler gave him a junior writer's contract. He wrote a story, The Great American Hoax, which sold to Good Housekeeping but was never published.

Chayefsky went to Hollywood in 1947 with the aim of becoming a screenwriter. His friends Garson Kanin and Ruth Gordon found him a job in the accounting office of Universal Pictures. He studied acting at the Actor's Lab and Kanin got him a bit part in the film A Double Life. He returned to New York, submitted scripts, and was hired as an apprentice scriptwriter by Universal. His script outlines were not accepted and he was fired after six weeks. After returning to New York, Chayefsky wrote the outline for a play that he submitted to the William Morris Agency. The agency, treating it as a novella, submitted it to Good Housekeeping magazine. Movie rights were purchased by Twentieth Century Fox, Chayefsky was hired to write the script, and he returned to Hollywood in 1948. But Chayefsky was discouraged by the studio system, which involved rewrites and relegated writers to inferior roles, so he quit and moved back to New York, vowing not to return.

During the late 1940s, he began working full-time on short stories and radio scripts, and during that period, he was a gagwriter for radio host Robert Q. Lewis. Chayefsky later recalled, "I sold some plays to men who had an uncanny ability not to raise money."

=== Early 1950s ===
During 1951–52, Chayefsky wrote adaptations for radio's Theater Guild on the Air: The Meanest Man in the World (with James Stewart), Cavalcade of America, Tommy (with Van Heflin and Ruth Gordon), and Over 21 (with Wally Cox).

His play The Man Who Made the Mountain Shake was noticed by Elia Kazan, and by his wife Molly Kazan who helped Chayefsky with revisions. It was retitled Fifth From Garibaldi but was never produced. In 1951, the movie As Young as You Feel was adapted from a Chayefsky story.

At the start of the decade, Chayefsky moved into the new medium of television. His first TV credit was co-writing an adaptation of Budd Schulberg's What Makes Sammy Run?, which aired in April 1949. He then wrote half-hour scripts for the TV series Danger and Manhunt. After seeing Chayefsky's work, talent agent (and future TV producer) David Susskind encouraged him to contact Fred Coe, producer of The Philco Television Playhouse. As an initial assignment, Coe asked Chayefsky to adapt a Reader's Digest article by Paul Deutschman, "It Happened on a Brooklyn Subway", about a photographer on a New York City Subway train who reunites a concentration camp survivor with his long-lost wife. Since Chayefsky had always wanted to use a synagogue as a backdrop, he converted the photographer into a Jewish cantor who is having a crisis of faith on the eve of Rosh Hashanah. The result was Chayefsky's first hour-long TV show, Holiday Song, broadcast in September 1952 (and brought back for an encore performance a year later).

He submitted more work for Philco Playhouse, including Printer's Measure (1953), The Big Deal (1953), The Bachelor Party (1953), and Catch My Boy on Sunday (1954). He also wrote a story for Gulf Playhouse, "A Gift from Cotton Mather" (1953), directed by a young Arthur Penn.

The seventh season of Philco Playhouse began September 19, 1954 with E. G. Marshall and Eva Marie Saint in Chayefsky's Middle of the Night, a play which relocated to Broadway theaters 15 months later. In 1956, Middle of the Night opened on Broadway with Edward G. Robinson and Gena Rowlands, and its success led to a national tour. It was filmed by Columbia Pictures in 1959 with Kim Novak and Fredric March.

=== Marty and fame ===
In 1953, Chayefsky wrote Marty, which premiered on Philco Playhouse with Rod Steiger and Nancy Marchand. Marty is about a decent, hard-working Bronx butcher, pining for the company of a woman in his life but despairing of ever finding true love in a relationship. Fate pairs him with a plain, shy schoolteacher named Clara whom he rescues from the embarrassment of being abandoned by her blind date in a local dance hall. The production, the actors and Chayefsky's naturalistic dialogue received much critical acclaim and influenced subsequent live television dramas.

Chayefsky was initially uninterested when producer Harold Hecht sought to buy film rights for Marty for Hecht-Hill-Lancaster. Chayefsky, still upset by his treatment years before, demanded creative control, consultation on casting, and the same director as in the TV version, Delbert Mann. Surprisingly, Hecht agreed to all of Chayefsky's demands, and named Chayefsky "associate producer" of the film. Chayefsky then requested and was granted "co-director" status, so that he could take over production if Mann were fired.

The screenplay was little changed from the teleplay, but with Clara's role expanded. Chayefsky was involved in all casting decisions and had a cameo role, playing one of Marty's friends, unseen, in a car. Actress Betsy Blair, playing Clara, faced difficulties because of her affiliation with left-wing causes, and United Artists demanded that she be removed. Chayefsky refused, and her husband Gene Kelly also intervened on her behalf. Blair remained in the cast.

In September 1954, after most of the movie had been filmed, the studio ceased production due to accounting and financial difficulties. From the start, producer Harold Hecht encountered resistance to the Marty project from his partner Burt Lancaster, with the latter "only tolerating" it. The film had a limited publicity budget. But reviews were glowing, and the film won the Palme d'Or at the 1955 Cannes Film Festival, and the Academy Award for Best Picture as well as a Best Actor Oscar for the star Ernest Borgnine, greatly boosting Chayefsky's career.

=== Late 1950s ===
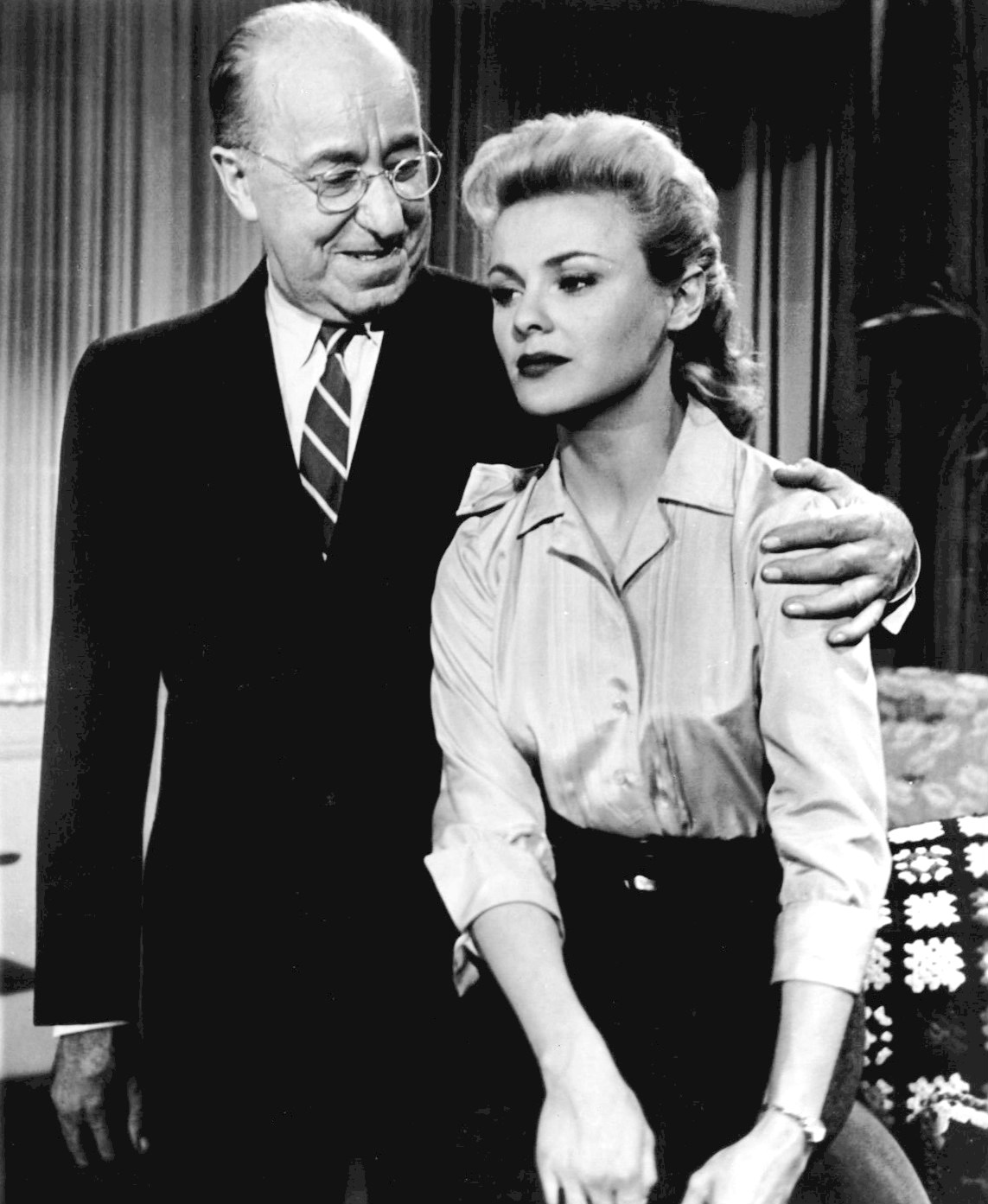
Ed Wynn and Kathleen Crowley in "The Great American Hoax" (1957), for The 20th Century Fox Hour

After his success with Marty, Chayefsky continued to write for TV and theater as well as for film. His teleplay, The Great American Hoax, was broadcast May 15, 1957 during the second season of The 20th Century Fox Hour.

His earlier work, The Bachelor Party, was bought by United Artists, with Chayefsky assigned to adapt it for the screen. His 1955 teleplay, The Catered Affair, was acquired by Metro-Goldwyn-Mayer, with Gore Vidal hired to write the screenplay. The Catered Affair (1956) film did well in Europe but poorly in U.S. theaters.

The Bachelor Party (1957) was budgeted at $750,000, twice Marty's budget, but received far less acclaim and was viewed by United Artists as artistically inferior. The studio chose instead to promote another Hecht-Hill-Lancaster film, Sweet Smell of Success, which it believed to be better. The Bachelor Party was a commercial failure, and never made a profit.

Chayefsky wrote a film adaptation of his Broadway play Middle of the Night, originally writing the female lead role for Marilyn Monroe. She passed on the part, which went to Kim Novak. He also commenced work on The Goddess, the story of the rise and fall of a movie star resembling Monroe. The star of The Goddess, Kim Stanley, despised the film and refused to publicize it. He and Stanley clashed during production of the film, in which Chayefsky served as producer as well as screenwriter. Despite her requests, Chayefsky refused to change any aspect of the script. Monroe's husband, Arthur Miller believed that the film was based on his wife's life and protested to Chayefsky. The film received positive reviews, and Chayefsky received an Academy Award nomination for his script. A New York Herald Tribune reviewer called the film "a substantial advance in the work of Chayefsky."

Chayefsky denied for years that the film was based on Monroe, but Chayefsky's biographer Shaun Considine observes that not only was she the prototype but the film "captured her longing and despair" accurately.

In 1958 Chayefsky began adapting Middle of the Night as a film, and he decided not to use the star of the Broadway version, Edward G. Robinson, with whom he had clashed, choosing instead Fredric March. Elizabeth Taylor initially agreed to appear in the female lead, but dropped out. Kim Novak was ultimately cast in the part. The film was chosen as the American entry at the Cannes Film Festival, but reviews were mixed and the film had only a short run in theaters.

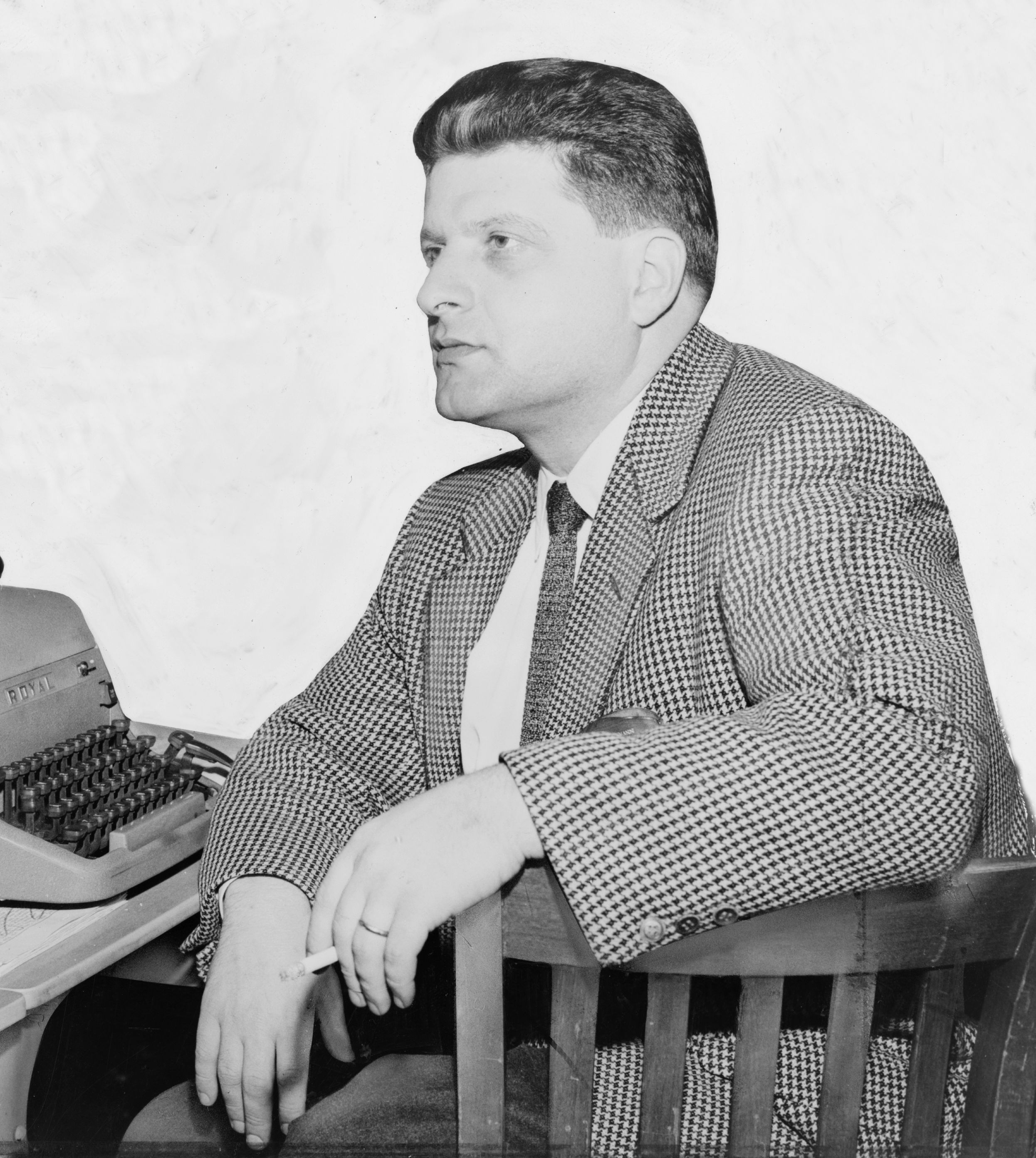
Chayefsky in 1958

The Tenth Man (1959) marked Chayefsky's second Broadway theatrical success, garnering 1960 Tony Award nominations for Best Play, Best Director (Tyrone Guthrie) and Best Scenic Design. Guthrie received another nomination for Chayefsky's Gideon, as did actor Fredric March. Chayefsky's final Broadway theatrical production, a play based on the life of Joseph Stalin, The Passion of Josef D, received unfavorable reviews and ran for only 15 performances.

Erik Barnouw wrote in The Image Empire—the third volume of his history of American broadcasting—that advertisers in the 1950s ended realistic television dramas from Chayefsky and other writers, because their scripts did not solve life's problems with the purchase of a new product. During the course of his career, Chayefsky constantly toyed with the idea of lampooning the television industry, which he succeeded in doing with Network.

=== The Americanization of Emily ===
Although Chayefsky wished only to do original screenplays, he was persuaded by producer Martin Ransohoff to adapt William Bradford Huie's 1959 novel that was eventually filmed with the book's title The Americanization of Emily (1964). The novel dealt with interservice rivalries prior to the Normandy landings during World War II, with a love story at the center of the plot. Chayefsky agreed to adapting the novel but only if he could fundamentally change the story. He made the titular character more sophisticated, but refusing to be "Americanized" by accepting material goods.

William Wyler was initially brought in as the director, but his relationship with Chayefsky deteriorated when he sought to change the script. William Holden was initially cast in the male lead, but that led to conflict when he asked that Julie Andrews be replaced by his then-girlfriend, Capucine. James Garner, adept at comedy with sophisticated dialogue but originally slated to play a supporting role, replaced Holden and delivered a critically acclaimed performance while James Coburn took over the part originally meant for Garner. Both James Garner and Julie Andrews always maintained that The Americanization of Emily was their favorite film of their own work. The film opened in August 1964 to superlative reviews but was a box office failure, possibly due to its extremely controversial anti-war stance at the dawn of the Vietnam War. The studio changed the title in the middle of its release, calling it Emily...she's super! to avoid confusing part of the public with a seven-syllable word in the title. The film has since been praised as a "vanguard anti-war film."

=== 1960s 'fallow period' ===
The failure of Americanization of Emily and Josef D. on Broadway shook Chayefsky's confidence, and was the beginning of what his biographer Shaun Considine calls a "fallow period." He agreed to do novel adaptations, which he had previously shunned, and was hired to adapt the Richard Jessup novel The Cincinnati Kid. Director Sam Peckinpah rejected the script, and Chayefsky was fired. Peckinpah was replaced by Norman Jewison shortly after the film began production.

Chayefsky worked for a time on adapting Huie's book Three Lives for Mississippi, about the murders of three civil rights workers in 1964, and in 1967 was hired to adapt the Broadway musical Paint Your Wagon. He was fired from the film after producing a script that Alan Jay Lerner, the playwright and producer, felt lacked "a musical structure." Chayefsky had his name removed as screenwriter but remained as adapter.

=== Comeback with The Hospital ===
In 1969 and 1970. Chayefsky began to consider a film that would be set among the civil unrest taking place at the time. When his wife Susan received poor care at a hospital, he pitched to United Artists a story based at a hospital. To ensure that he had the same kind of creative control given to playwrights, he formed Simcha Productions, named after the Hebrew version of his given name, Sidney. He then commenced research, reading medical books and visiting hospitals.

The leading character in the film, Dr. Herbert Bock, included many of Chayefsky's personal traits. Bock had been a "boy genius" who felt bitter and that his life was over. One of the monologues of George C. Scott as Bock in the film, in which Bock says he is miserable and considering suicide, was repeated verbatim from a conversation that Chayefsky had with a business associate during that time.

The long speeches written for Bock and other characters by Chayefsky, later praised by critics, met resistance from United Artists executives during the making of the film. The script was described as "too talky" and containing excessive medical terminology. But Chayefsky, as producer, prevailed. He also vetoed the studio's suggestion that Walter Matthau or Burt Lancaster be hired for the lead role, insisting on Scott. Chayefsky worked on the dialogue with Diana Rigg, the female lead, but Scott rejected his input.

After filming, Chayefsky spoke the opening narration after several actors were rejected for the job. It was supposed to be temporary, but became the one that was used in the film. Although some initial reviews were negative, the film received rave reviews from leading critics, and was a box office hit. Chayefsky won an Academy Award for his script, and his career was revived.

=== Network ===
Creating a story about a TV network had interested Chayefsky for a while. In 1968, he worked on a pilot script for a comedic TV series he called The Impostors or There's No Business, about "subversives who infiltrate a television network and undermine it from within." In a script note, he wrote: "We are not dealing with a human institution. We are dealing with an enormous profit-making machine." But the TV series was not pursued. Shaun Considine says the "opening hook" for the Network script came "when Chayefsky was watching a respected, supposedly learned TV anchor rattle off some scripted inanities on the evening news. 'Jesus, how can these guys live with themselves?'" Chayefsky believed that TV news was desensitizing viewers to violence and murder, and that it was affecting the broadcasters. In 1974, a local Florida news anchor, Christine Chubbuck, committed suicide during a broadcast. Chayefsky asked his friend, NBC News anchor John Chancellor, if it was possible for an anchorman to go crazy on the air, and Chancellor replied, "Every day." Within a week of that conversation, Chayefsky had written the rough draft of a script, centering on Howard Beale, an elderly, disillusioned anchor who announces he will commit suicide on the air.

Chayefsky researched the project by watching hours of television and consulting with NBC executive David Tebet, who allowed the writer to attend programming meetings. Chayefsky also gathered information at CBS and met with Walter Cronkite. The completed script reflected the writer's research and his political opinion, prevalent at the time, that Arabs were "buying up" U.S. corporations. The "mad as hell" speech was a deeply personal statement encapsulating the core of Chayefsky's beliefs during the early 1970s. He later called it an easy speech to write as it expressed his view that people had a right to get mad.

The script encountered difficulties because of film industry concerns that it was too tough on television. Ultimately it was decided, in a deal announced in July 1975, that Network would be a co-production of MGM and United Artists (UA), with Chayefsky having complete creative control. George C. Scott was offered the supporting role of Max Schumacher (Beale's friend and a traditional journalist representing integrity in the media) but rejected it, and the role went to William Holden. Chayefsky refused requests by MGM and UA to give the film a "softer" ending; the studios feared that the actual ending – with the Beale character assassinated at the order of network executives – would alienate audiences.

Outside the expected negative reviews from TV network-based film critics, Network was a critical and box office success, winning ten Academy Award nominations, and Chayefsky won his third Academy Award, making him the only three-time solo recipient of a screenwriting Oscar (all the other three-time winners—Francis Ford Coppola, Charles Brackett, Woody Allen, and Billy Wilder—shared at least one of their awards with co-writers). When Peter Finch posthumously won Best Actor for playing Beale, Chayefsky was chosen by prior arrangement to accept on the late actor's behalf. But on the night of the awards, Chayefsky defied the show's producer, William Friedkin, and called Finch's wife Eletha to the stage to receive the Oscar.

Network is said to have "presaged the advent of reality television by twenty years" and was a "sardonic satire" of the television industry, dealing with the "dehumanization of modern life."

=== Altered States ===
After Network, Chayefsky explored an offer from Warren Beatty to write a film based on the life of John Reed and his book Ten Days That Shook the World. He agreed to do research, and spent three months exploring the subject of what eventually became the Beatty film Reds. Negotiations with Beatty's lawyers failed.

In the spring of 1977, Chayefsky began work on a project delving into "man's search of his true self." The genesis of the idea was a joke with his friends Bob Fosse and Herb Gardner. The three cooked up a joke project to remake King Kong, in which Kong becomes a movie star. The comic project got Chayefsky interested in exploring the origins of the human spirit. That evolved into a project updating the theme of Dr. Jekyll and Mr. Hyde.

Chayefsky conducted research on genetic regression, speaking to doctors and professors of anthropology and human genetics. He then began a rough outline of a story in which the lead character immerses himself in an isolation tank, and with the aid of hallucinogens regresses to become a prehuman creature. Chayefsky wrote an eighty-seven page treatment and, at the suggestion of Columbia executive Daniel Melnick, he adapted it into a novel.

Film rights were bought by Columbia Pictures for nearly $1 million, and with the same creative control and financial terms as for Network. Chayefsky suffered greatly from stress while working on the novel, resulting in a heart attack in 1977. The heart attack resulted in strict dietary and lifestyle restrictions. The novel, titled Altered States, was published by HarperCollins in June 1978 and received mixed reviews. Chayefsky did not promote the book, which he viewed only as a blueprint for the screenplay.

Since his contract gave him creative control, Chayefsky participated in the selection of William Hurt and Blair Brown as the leads. Arthur Penn was initially hired as director, but left after disagreements with Chayefsky. He was replaced by Ken Russell.

Chayefsky made it clear that he would allow no input into the dialogue or narrative, which Russell felt was too "soppy." Russell was confident that he could get rid of Chayefsky, but found that "the monkey on my back was always there and wouldn't let go." Russell was polite and deferential prior to production but after rehearsals began in 1979 "began to treat Paddy as a nonentity" and was "mean and sarcastic," according to the film's producer Howard Gottfried.

Chayefsky had the power to fire Russell, but was told by Gottfried that he could only do so if he took over direction himself. He left for New York and continued to monitor production. The actors were not permitted to alter the dialogue. Chayefsky later said that in retaliation the actors were instructed to speak their lines while eating or talking too fast. Russell stated that the fast pace and overlapping dialogue was Chayefsky's idea.

Upset by the filming of his screenplay, Chayefsky withdrew from the production of Altered States and took his name off the credits, substituting the pseudonym Sidney Aaron.

== Personality and characteristics ==
In his book Mad as Hell: The Making of Network and the Fateful Vision of the Angriest Man in Movies, journalist Dave Itzkoff wrote that the Howard Beale character in Network was a product of Chayefsky's many frustrations. Itzkoff wrote: "Where others avoided conflict, he cultivated it and embraced it. His fury nourished him, making him intense and unpredictable, but also keeping him focused and productive." Itzkoff describes Chayefsky as "intensely troubled, a huge egomaniac and control freak, dispirited about the world, wryly comic, and a both present and absent family man."

In his biography of Chayefsky's friend Bob Fosse, drama critic Martin Gottfried said Chayefsky was

compact and burly in the bulky way of a schoolyard athlete, with thick dark hair and a bent nose that could pass for a streetfighter's. He was a grown-up with one foot in the boys' clubs of his city youth, a street snob who would not allow the loss of his nostalgia. He was an intellectual competitor, always spoiling for a political argument or a philosophical argument, or any exchange over any issue, changing sides for the fun of the fray. A liberal, he was annoyed by liberals; a proud Jew, he wouldn't let anyone call him a "Jewish writer".

In his biography Mad as Hell, author Shaun Considine says that Chayefsky had a "dual personality". Chayefsky's "Paddy" persona had "character, caprice; it appealed to his sense of swagger" and gave him confidence to stand up for his rights. "Sidney" was the "silent creator" who had the talent and genius.

Chayefsky was under psychoanalysis for years, beginning in the late 1950s, to deal with his volatile behavior and rage, which at times was difficult to control.

== Political activism ==
=== Opposition to McCarthyism ===
Early in his career, Chayefsky was an opponent of McCarthyism. He signed a telegram signed by other writers and performers protesting federal inaction after a concert featuring Paul Robeson in Peekskill, New York, prompted violence in which 150 people were injured. As a result, his name appeared in the anti-Communist vigilante publication The Firing Line, published by the American Legion. Although Chayefsky feared being subpoeanaed and his career ruined, that never happened. Actress Betsy Blair described Chayefsky as a Social Democrat and as an anti-Marxist.

He opposed the Vietnam War as a "stupid and utterly unnecessary war whose principal victim would be the United States" and sent a letter to President Richard Nixon decrying the My Lai Massacre, saying Americans were in danger of turning into "a nation of bad Germans."

=== Soviet Jews and Israel ===
In the 1970s Chayefsky worked for the cause of Soviet Jews, and in 1971 went to Brussels as part of a U.S. delegation to the International Conference on Soviet Jewry. Believing that the conference was insufficiently aggressive, he founded a new activist organization in New York, Writers and Artists for Peace in the Middle East. Co-founders included Colleen Dewhurst, Frank Gervasi, Leon Uris, Gerold Frank and Elie Wiesel. Chayefsky believed that "Zionists" was a code word for "Jews" by Marxist antisemites.

Chayefsky was increasingly interested in Israel at that time. In an interview with Women's Wear Daily in 1971, he said that he believed that Jews around the world were in imminent danger of genocide. Journalist Dave Itzkoff writes that in the 1970s his views on Israel possessed a "more aggressive and admittedly paranoid streak." He believed that antisemitism was rife in the U.S., especially in the New Left, and once physically confronted a heckler who used an antisemitic slur during a David Steinberg performance. While filming The Hospital, Chayefsky commenced work on a film project called "The Habbakuk Conspiracy," which he described as a "study of life within an Arab guerrilla cell on the West Bank of the Jordan." The project was sold to United Artists but never filmed, which resulted in lingering resentment toward the studio.

Chayefsky composed, without credit, pro-Israel ads for the Anti-Defamation League at the time of the Yom Kippur War in 1973. In the late 1970s Writers and Artists for Peace in the Middle East placed full-page newspaper ads written by Chayefsky attacking the Palestine Liberation Organization for the massacre of Israeli athletes at the 1972 Summer Olympics.

He rejected Jane Fonda and Vanessa Redgrave for the role of the female lead in Network because of what he alleged were their "anti-Israel leanings," even though Redgrave was director Sidney Lumet's first choice. Redgrave, accepting the Best Supporting Actress Academy Award for Julia at the 1978 Academy Awards, made a statement during her award acceptance speech denouncing protestors who were members of the Jewish Defense League (JDL), led by Rabbi Meir Kahane, who burned an effigy of Redgrave outside the Awards site, picketed the Academy Awards ceremony to protest against her, and had earlier called on 20th Century Fox to denounce Redgrave and promise never to hire her again, saying, "You should be very proud that in the last few weeks you have stood firm and you have refused to be intimidated by the threats of a small bunch of Zionist hoodlums whose behavior is an insult to the stature of Jews all over the world, and to their great and heroic record of struggle against fascism and oppression." Chayefsky, appearing later, upbraided Redgrave and said the following: "Uh, before I get on to the writing Awards, there's a little matter I'd like to tidy up, at least, if I expect to live with myself tomorrow morning. I would like to say, personal opinion of course, that I'm sick and tired of people exploiting the occasion of the Academy Awards, for the propagation of their own personal political propaganda. I would like to suggest to Miss Redgrave that her winning an Academy Award is not a pivotal moment in history, does not require a Proclamation, and a simple thank you would have sufficed." The Redgrave and Chayefsky remarks prompted controversy.

== Family ==
Chayefsky met his future wife Susan Sackler during his 1940s stay in Hollywood. The couple married in February 1949. Their son Dan was born in 1955.

Chayefsky's relationship with his wife was strained for much of their marriage, and she became withdrawn and unwilling to appear with him as he became more prominent. Gwen Verdon, wife of his friend Bob Fosse, only saw Susan Chayefsky five times in her life.

Susan Chayefsky suffered from muscular dystrophy, and Dan Chayefsky described himself to author Dave Itzkoff as "a self-destructive teen who brought more pressure to the family home." Despite an alleged affair with Kim Novak, which resulted in his asking his wife for a divorce, Paddy Chayefsky remained married to Susan Chayefsky until his death, and sought her opinion on his screenplays, including Network. She died in 2000.

== Death ==
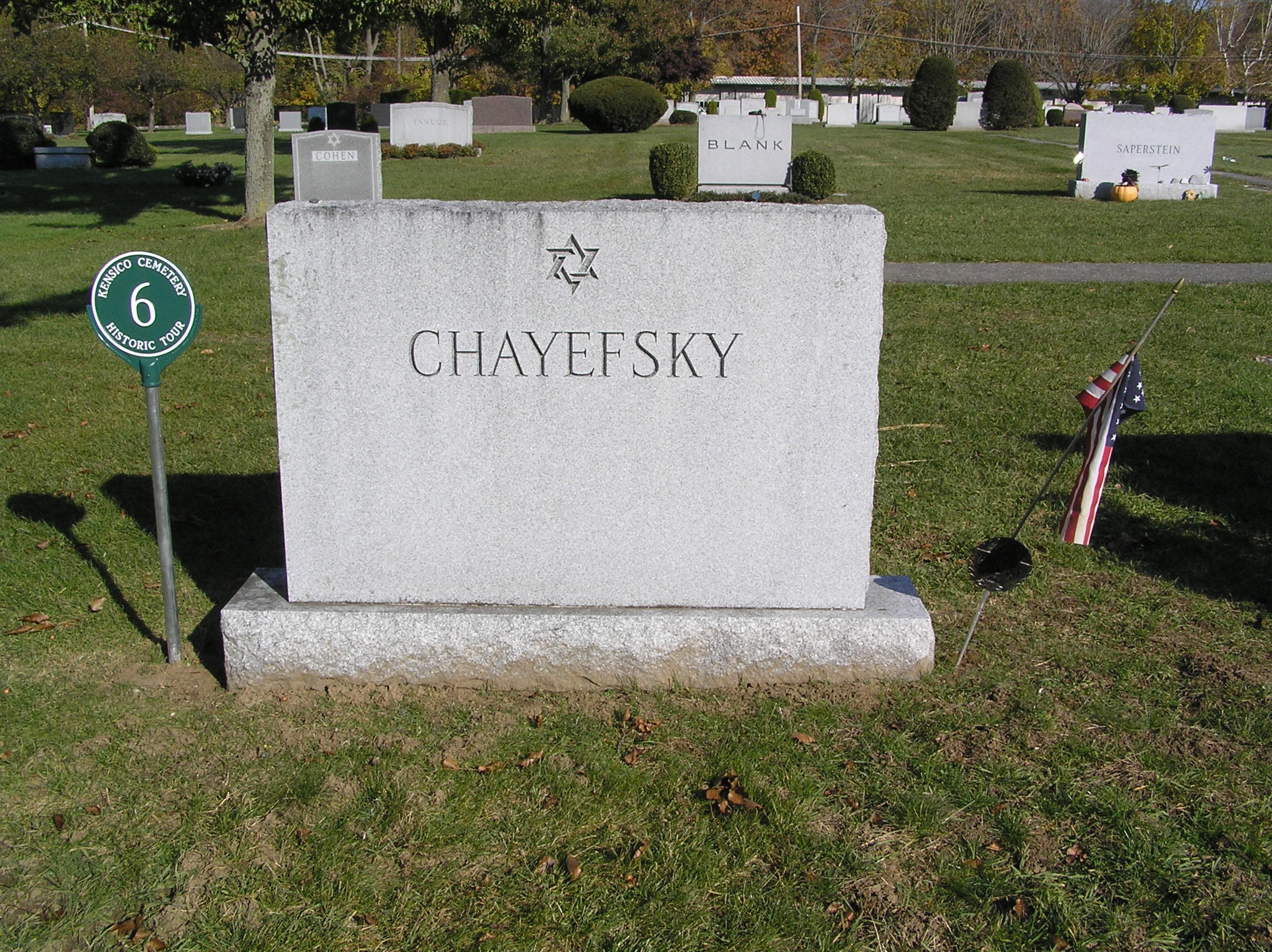
Paddy Chayefsky's grave in Kensico Cemetery

Chayefsky contracted pleurisy in 1980 and again in 1981. Tests revealed cancer, but he refused surgery out of fear that surgeons would "cut me up because of that movie I wrote about them," referring to The Hospital. He opted for chemotherapy. He died in a New York hospital on August 1, 1981, aged 58, and was interred in the Sharon Gardens Division of Kensico Cemetery in Valhalla, Westchester County, New York.

Longtime friend Bob Fosse performed a tap dance at the funeral, as part of a deal he and Chayefsky had made when Fosse was in the hospital for open-heart surgery. If Fosse died first, Chayefsky promised to deliver a tedious eulogy or Fosse would dance at Chayefsky's memorial if he were the one to die first. Fosse would dedicate his final film Star 80 to Chayefsky in 1983. Chayefsky's personal papers are at the Wisconsin Historical Society and the New York Public Library for the Performing Arts, Billy Rose Theatre Division.

== Filmography ==
- The True Glory (1945) (uncredited)
- As Young as You Feel (1951) (story)
- Marty (1955)
- The Catered Affair (1956) (based on his television play)
- The Bachelor Party (1957)
- The Goddess (1958)
- Middle of the Night (1959)
- The Americanization of Emily (1964)
- Paint Your Wagon (1969) (adaptation)
- The Hospital (1971)
- Network (1976)
- Altered States (1980) (as "Sidney Aaron")

== Television and stage plays ==
Television (selection)

- 1950–1955 Danger
- 1951–1952 Manhunt
- 1951–1960 Goodyear Playhouse
- 1952–1954 Philco Television Playhouse
- 1952 Holiday Song
- 1952 The Reluctant Citizen
- 1953 Printer's Measure
- 1953 Marty
- 1953 The Big Deal
- 1953 The Bachelor Party
- 1953 The Sixth Year
- 1954 Catch My Boy On Sunday
- 1954 The Mother
- 1954 Middle of the Night
- 1955 The Catered Affair
- 1956 The Great American Hoax

Stage

- No T.O. for Love (1945)
- Middle of the Night (1956)
- The Tenth Man (1959)
- Gideon (1961)
- The Passion of Josef D. (1964)
- The Latent Heterosexual (originally titled The Accountant's Tale or The Case of the Latent Heterosexual) (1968)

== Novels ==
- Altered States: A Novel (1978)

== Accolades ==
=== Academy Awards ===
Year	Category	Nominated work	Result	Ref.
1956	Best Adapted Screenplay	Marty	Won	
1959	Best Original Screenplay	The Goddess	Nominated	
1972	Best Original Screenplay	The Hospital	Won	
1977	Best Original Screenplay	Network	Won	

=== BAFTA Awards ===
Year	Category	Nominated work	Result	Ref.
1973	Best Screenplay	The Hospital	Won (Note: Tied with Larry McMurtry and Peter Bogdanovich for The Last Picture Show)	
1978	Best Screenplay	Network	Nominated	

=== Golden Globe Awards ===
Year	Category	Nominated work	Result	Ref.
1972	Best Screenplay	The Hospital	Won	
1977	Best Screenplay	Network	Won	

=== Tony Awards ===
Year	Category	Nominated work	Result	Ref.
1960	Best Play	The Tenth Man	Nominated	
1962	Best Play	Gideon	Nominated	

=== Primetime Emmy Awards ===
Year	Category	Nominated work	Result	Ref.
1955	Best Written Dramatic Material	The Philco Television Playhouse	Nominated	
1956	Best Original Teleplay Writing	The Catered Affair (Goodyear Television Playhouse)	Nominated	

=== Writers Guild of America Awards ===
Year	Category	Nominated work	Result	Ref.
1956	Best Written Drama	Marty	Won	
1972	Best Comedy Written Directly for the Screenplay	The Hospital	Won	
1977	Best Drama Written Directly for the Screenplay	Network	Won	

=== Big Four (American film critics awards) ===
Association	Year	Category	Nominated work	Result	Ref.
Los Angeles Film Critics Association	1976	Best Screenplay	Network	Won	
National Society of Film Critics	1976	Best Screenplay	Network	2nd Place	
New York Film Critics Circle	1976	Best Screenplay	Network	Won	

== See also ==
- List of Russian Academy Award winners and nominees

== Bibliography ==
- Considine, Shaun (1994). Mad as hell: the life and work of Paddy Chayefsky (1st ed.). New York: Random House. ISBN 0679408924.
- Itzkoff, Dave (2014). Mad as hell : the making of Network and the fateful vision of the angriest man in movies. New York: Times Books. ISBN 978-0805095692.
