= Dave Itzkoff =

American journalist

David Itzkoff
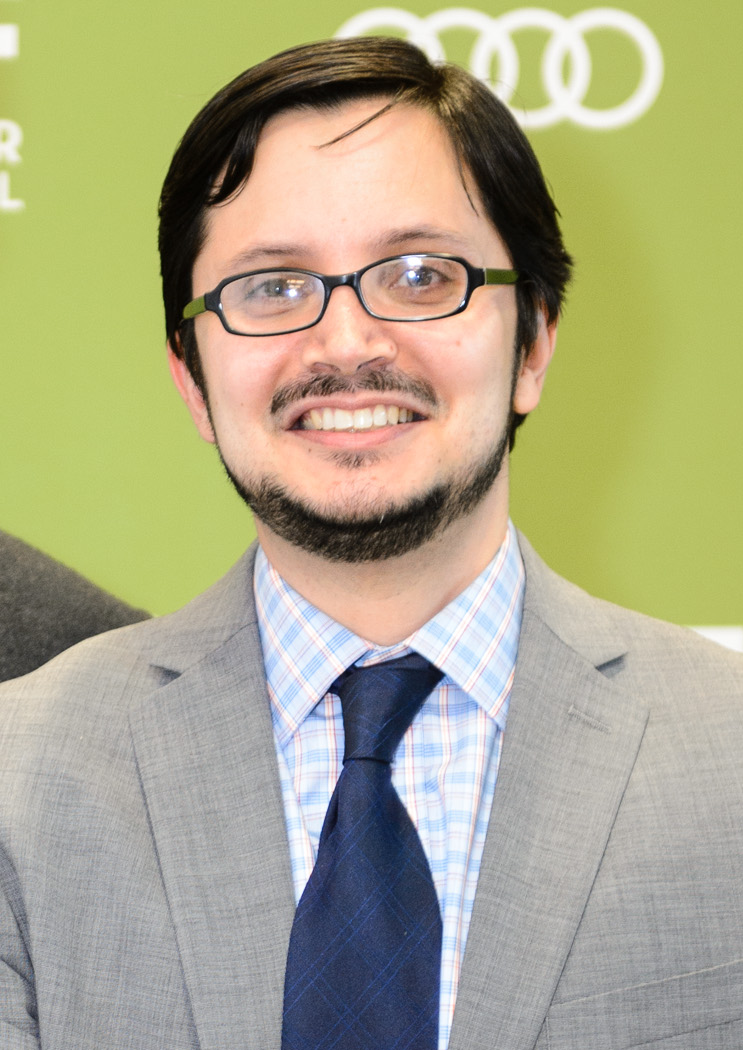
- Itzkoff at the 2014 Montclair Film Festival
- Born: David L. Itzkoff; March 2, 1976 (age 50); New York City, U.S.
- Education: Princeton University (BA)
- Occupations: Journalist; author
- Years active: 1999–present
- Spouse: Amy Justman (m. 2008)
- Children: 1

David L. Itzkoff (born March 2, 1976) is an American journalist and writer who is a former culture reporter for The New York Times. Before joining the Times, he was an associate editor at Spin and Maxim. He is the author of Cocaine's Son, a memoir about growing up with his drug-abusing father.

== Early and personal life ==
Itzkoff was born in New York City to Madelin and Gerald Itzkoff, and grew up in the Bronx. His father had a cocaine addiction, which affected Dave's home life. He has a sister, Amanda, a psychiatrist. He is Jewish; his paternal grandfather and great-grandfather were Russian Jews who worked in the fur trade.

Itzkoff obtained his B.A. in English literature from Princeton University in 1998.

== Career ==
In 1999, Itzkoff worked as an editorial assistant for Details magazine. He worked for Maxim magazine from 1999 to 2002 and Spin magazine from 2002 to 2006. From June 2007 to July 2008, Itzkoff worked as a freelance editor for the Sunday Styles section in The New York Times. He is a former culture reporter for The New York Times and writes frequently about film, television and comedy. His latest work is a biography of Robin Williams.

In 2023, Itzkoff was one of almost 1,000 New York Times contributors to sign an open letter expressing "serious concerns about editorial bias" in the newspaper's reporting on transgender people. The letter characterized the newspaper's reporting as using "an eerily familiar mix of pseudoscience and euphemistic, charged language," and raised concerns regarding the paper's employment practices regarding trans contributors.

== Personal life ==
He married actress and singer Amy Justman in 2008, and lives in New York. Together they have one son (b. 2015).

== Books ==
- Lads: A Memoir of Manhood, published in 2004
- Cocaine's Son: A Memoir, published in 2011
- Mad as Hell: The Making of Network and the Fateful Vision of the Angriest Man in Movies, published February 2014. ISBN 978-1250062246
- Robin, a biography of Robin Williams, published in May 2018
