= Totie Fields =

American comedian (1930–1978)

- Born: Sophie Feldman; May 7, 1930; Hartford, Connecticut, U.S.
- Died: August 2, 1978 (aged 48); Las Vegas, Nevada, U.S.
- Resting place: Mount Sinai Memorial Park Cemetery in Los Angeles
- Other name: Totie Fields Johnston
- Occupation: Comedian
- Years active: 1954–1978
- Spouse(s): George William Johnston, Jr. (1950–1978; her death)
- Children: 2

Totie Fields (born Sophie Feldman; May 7, 1930 – August 2, 1978) was an American comedian.

== Early life ==
Fields was born Sophie Feldman in Hartford, Connecticut. She started singing in Boston clubs while still in high school, taking the stage name of Totie Fields. She was Jewish.

== Career ==
Fields gained fame during the 1950s, '60s, and '70s. After years of Fields' successful appearances in nightclubs, Ed Sullivan gave Fields her first big break when he booked her on his show after seeing her perform at the Copacabana in New York City in March 1964. She made multiple appearances on The Ed Sullivan Show, The Mike Douglas Show, The Merv Griffin Show, and The Tonight Show Starring Johnny Carson. She also appeared in a 1971 episode of The Carol Burnett Show (season 4, episode 21) and a 1972 episode of Here's Lucy (season 5, episode 7) starring Lucille Ball.

On Mike Douglas' show in 1974, Totie met the band Kiss, who were making their first national TV appearance. Fields joked that it would be funny if bassist Gene Simmons, under the makeup, turned out to be "just a nice Jewish boy". Simmons (who is not only Jewish, but was born in Israel) responded, "You should only know", to which Fields said, "I do! You can’t hide the hook!" (Simmons and Fields became friends and corresponded until her death.)

Fields also appeared on various television game shows in the late 1960s and '70s, including multiple episodes of both Hollywood Squares and Tattletales with her husband George Johnston.

In 1972, Fields wrote a humorous diet book titled I Think I'll Start on Monday: The Official 8½ Oz. Mashed Potato Diet.

== Health problems ==
Fields was plagued with health problems in the last years of her life. She suffered from diabetes, and in March 1976, she had surgery to remove a blood clot, but it failed and she developed phlebitis. In April 1976, Fields' left leg was amputated above the knee. This caused her to use a scooter for mobility and file a $2 million lawsuit against the hospital and doctors who had initially treated her. While still recovering from the amputation, Fields suffered two heart attacks.

Fields' last television appearance before her surgery was in a rare straight dramatic guest-starring role on the CBS-TV drama series Medical Center, which aired on February 23, 1976. In that episode, "Life, Death, and Mrs. Armbruster", Fields played Phoebe Armbruster, a hospital janitor plagued by heart problems.

In June 1977, a much-thinner Fields starred in the Home Box Office special series Standing Room Only, beginning her show seated in a wheelchair. As the audience welcomed her, she stood up, causing the cheering audience to stand with her. Said Fields: "I've waited all my life to say this ... I weigh less than Elizabeth Taylor!" At the time, Taylor had gained over 50 pounds during her marriage to Senator John Warner. Rather than avoid the subject of her amputation, Totie used it as material in her touring comedy act at theaters around the country.

In October 1977, Fields was diagnosed with breast cancer and had a mastectomy to remove her right breast and also had an eye operation. However, Fields continued to perform, incorporating her health problems into her act. As a result, this changed the tone of her humor. Actor Van Johnson, who was a friend of Fields', was said to have remarked, "When Totie lost weight, she wasn't funny anymore."

Nevertheless in 1978, during the last year of her life, Fields was voted "Entertainer of the Year" and "Female Comedy Star of the Year" by the American Guild of Variety Artists.

=== Death ===
On August 2, 1978, Fields was scheduled to begin a two-week engagement at Las Vegas’ Sahara Hotel, when on the eve of the opening, she was stricken at home by a blood clot, suffering a fatal pulmonary embolism. She was rushed to nearby Sunrise Hospital and Medical Center, but was pronounced dead soon after. Her ashes were interred in Las Vegas, but after her husband George Johnston's death in January 1995, her remains were moved to the Mount Sinai Memorial Park Cemetery in Los Angeles to be interred with his.
