= The Catered Affair =

1956 film by Richard Brooks

- Theatrical release poster
- Directed by: Richard Brooks
- Screenplay by: Gore Vidal
- Based on: "The Catered Affair"; 1955 teleplay by Paddy Chayefsky
- Produced by: Sam Zimbalist
- Starring: Bette Davis; Ernest Borgnine; Debbie Reynolds; Barry Fitzgerald; Rod Taylor
- Cinematography: John Alton
- Edited by: Gene Ruggiero; Frank Santillo
- Music by: André Previn
- Production company: Metro-Goldwyn-Mayer
- Distributed by: Loew's Inc.
- Release date: June 14, 1956
- Running time: 92 minutes
- Country: United States
- Language: English
- Budget: $1 million
- Box office: $1.5 million

The article is about the film. For the stage adaptation, see A Catered Affair.

The Catered Affair trailer

The Catered Affair (also known as Wedding Party) is a 1956 American comedy drama film directed by Richard Brooks and produced by Sam Zimbalist from a screenplay by Gore Vidal, based on a 1955 television play from Goodyear Television Playhouse by Paddy Chayefsky. The film stars Bette Davis, Ernest Borgnine, Debbie Reynolds, Barry Fitzgerald, and Rod Taylor. The Catered Affair was Bette Davis' first picture for Metro-Goldwyn-Mayer, as it was for Rod Taylor after having signed a long-term contract with the studio. The film score was composed by André Previn, and the cinematographer was John Alton.

== Plot ==
Agnes Hurley is a disillusioned housewife married to Bronx cab driver Tom Hurley, who works for a large taxi fleet. Agnes (or Aggie) wants something better for her daughter Jane, while Tom has been saving for many years to purchase a taxi medallion and become self-employed.

When Jane announces her engagement to Ralph Halloran, Aggie sees this as an opportunity to have a romantic elaborate wedding, which she never had because they didn't have the money. However, Tom protests that they cannot afford it, and Jane is upset by the discord it is causing in the family.

Money troubles and conflicts within the family ensue, which also involve Uncle Jack Conlon, who lives with them. The conflict is resolved when Agnes realizes that it is the happiness of her family, rather than the expensive ceremony, that is most important. Plans for the expensive wedding are shelved, and Tom gets the medallion and a new taxi.

== Cast ==
- Bette Davis as Agnes Hurley
- Ernest Borgnine as Tom Hurley
- Debbie Reynolds as Jane Hurley
- Barry Fitzgerald as Uncle Jack Conlon
- Rod Taylor as Ralph Halloran
- Robert Simon as Mr. Halloran
- Madge Kennedy as Mrs. Halloran
- Dorothy Stickney as Mrs. Rafferty
- Carol Veazie as Mrs. Casey
- Joan Camden as Alice Scanlon
- Ray Stricklyn as Eddie Hurley
- Jay Adler as Sam Leiter

== Production ==
MGM bought the screen rights to the 1955 TV play that aired on Goodyear Television Playhouse in 1955. Ann Blyth was originally announced for the female lead Jane Hurley.

In 1964 Debbie Reynolds said she "hated making" the film "for personal reasons. I like the result and he directed me well, but the director made it difficult for me and gave me a hard time." She later wrote in Unsinkable: A Memoir that Richard Brooks hit her in the face and had to be pulled away by the assistant director.

== Reception ==
According to MGM records, the film earned $947,000 in the U.S. and Canada and $520,000 in other countries, resulting in a loss of $106,000. Critics' reviews were largely negative, with the film holding a 17% rating on Rotten Tomatoes.

The New York Times critic Bosley Crowther compared the film unfavorably to Marty and said the film lacked "compassion or appeal." He said that was "partly the fault of the writing, partly the fault of the film, and partly the fault of the direction, which is uneven in compass and style." Crowther criticized the acting, saying that Bette Davis' performance was "uncomfortably complicated and alien to the lowly locale." He wrote that Davis gave the role "the air of a gentlelady who has come down a little in the world and deliberately uses bad grammar, with some effort and considerable shame." Ernest Borgnine, he said, "gawks gargoylishly as her Bronx mate."

For her part, however, Davis said in 1973 that her performance was the most under-appreciated but the most self-satisfying of her career.

== Stage adaptation ==
A musical adaptation also titled A Catered Affair, with book by Harvey Fierstein and lyrics and music by John Bucchino, premiered at San Diego's Old Globe Theatre in 2007 and the following year played on Broadway at the Walter Kerr Theatre. The cast included Faith Prince, Tom Wopat, Leslie Kritzer, and Fierstein.

The play received mixed reviews and closed after 116 performances.

== See also ==
- List of American films of 1956
