= Umbrella marketing =

Marketing Strategy

Umbrella marketing refers to the explicit use of umbrellas in marketing campaigns, a phenomenon in China.

== Forms ==
The first high-profile case of umbrella marketing can be found in the 2017 Chinese Father's Day where Jingdong Mall utilised a 2015 online photo of a father and his son, causing a copyrights stir.

Since then, there has been a rise in umbrella marketing through umbrella-sharing schemes. In March 2017 Molisan introduced its umbrella-sharing scheme through its WeChat service account in Guangzhou, initially releasing 1000 umbrellas in six underground stations. In May 2017 e伞 (e-umbrella) released its scheme in Shenzhen, releasing 500 umbrellas the first day. Like the widespread bike-sharing schemes in China, these umbrella schemes work with a deposit followed by a pay-as-you-go service. In August 2017 Mosun was established as an umbrella-sharing scheme in Shanghai, running across Shanghai's Line 2 Metro stations.

In August 2017 Haier, the Chinese multinational consumer electronics company, also engaged in umbrella marketing through their launch of their custom umbrellas. Urbem Media, a Shanghai-based dining club, has similarly utilised umbrella marketing akin to other forms of guerilla marketing, whereby VIP members receive access to company customised umbrellas.

== See also ==
- Bicycle-sharing system
- Guerilla marketing
- Tissue-pack marketing
