= Polar Bear Café =

Japanese manga and anime series

- Cover of the first Blu-ray featuring Polar Bear, Panda, and Penguin

しろくまカフェ (Shirokuma Cafe)
- Genre: Slice of life, slapstick
- Manga

Polar Bear Café
- Written by: Aloha Higa
- Published by: Shogakukan
- English publisher: NA: Seven Seas Entertainment
- Imprint: Flower Comic Special
- Magazine: Flowers
- Original run: 2006 – 2013
- Volumes: 5
- Anime television series
- Directed by: Mitsuyuki Masuhara
- Produced by: Makoto Shiraishi; Shōji Matsui; Asakazu Iizumi
- Written by: Tōru Hosokawa
- Music by: Kenji Kondō
- Studio: Studio Pierrot
- Original network: TXN (TV Tokyo)
- Original run: April 5, 2012 – March 28, 2013
- Episodes: 50
- Manga

Polar Bear Café: Today's Special
- Written by: Aloha Higa
- Published by: Shueisha
- Magazine: Cocohana
- Original run: 2014 – present

Polar Bear Café (Japanese: しろくまカフェ, Hepburn: Shirokuma Cafe) is a Japanese manga series by Aloha Higa. The series serialized in Shogakukan's Josei magazine Monthly Flowers. It revolves around the everyday lives of a group of animals mingling with humans at a café run by a polar bear. An anime adaptation by Studio Pierrot aired in Japan between April 2012 and March 2013, and was simulcast globally on Crunchyroll.

== Characters ==
Polar Bear (シロクマ, Shirokuma)
Voiced by: Takahiro Sakurai
A polar bear who runs Polar Bear's Café, which serves organic foods and drinks and is popular with both humans and animals. He has a habit of making bad puns with his customers and friends, just for the amusement of hearing their retorts. He was born in Hudson Bay, Canada.
Panda (パンダ, Panda)
Voiced by: Jun Fukuyama
A lazy, somewhat dimwitted, and kind-hearted giant panda who works part-time at a zoo. He enjoys lazing around and eating bamboo and only orders iced coffee at the café until Polar Bear adds bamboo to the menu only for his sake. He is obsessed with all panda products and has a tendency to point out his popularity at the zoo and his own cuteness.
Penguin (ペンギン, Pengin)
Voiced by: Hiroshi Kamiya
An emperor penguin (コウテイペンギン, Kōtei Pengin; also his legal name) and a frequent customer of the café and friend of Polar Bear who generally orders a cafe mocha. He generally serves as the tsukkomi to the antics of Polar Bear and Panda. He has a crush on another penguin named Penko, and eventually upon learning that Penko has six identical sisters, he unintentionally ends up dating them all. However, Penguin's inability to get their names right sets off a chain of events that lead to them dumping him.
Grizzly (グリズリー, Gurizurī)
Voiced by: Yūichi Nakamura
A grizzly bear who is a childhood friend of Polar Bear. He runs a bar in the middle of town called "Bar the Grizzly" and has a rather fierce personality, though occasionally shows a soft side. He also usually serves as the tsukkomi to the antics of Polar Bear and Panda just like Penguin, a feature that curiously brought them to the point of becoming good friends. He hibernates during the winter but is constantly being woken up from his slumber by Polar Bear.
Panda-Mama (パンダママ)
Voiced by: Toshiyuki Morikawa
Panda and Mei Mei's mother who usually reprimands her son when he gets too lazy by threatening to suck him into her vacuum cleaner.
Sasako (笹子)
Voiced by: Aya Endo
A young human woman who works at the Polar Bear's Cafe. She used to live in the same town as Llama and her hobby is to take rides on her bicycle. Although not fond of scary stories, she's great at telling them, even making Mr. Handa faint of hearing it.
Handa (半田)
Voiced by: Wataru Hatano
The panda caretaker at the zoo Panda works at. Although he is quite popular with the animals at the zoo, he doesn't have as much luck getting the attention of women. He has a crush on Sasako. Also, he's really good at being scared, according to Penguin.
Llama (ラマ, Rama)
Voiced by: Daisuke Ono
A llama who likes grass and dreams of becoming a popular animal at the zoo just like Panda. He is often noted for his maturity.
Sloth (ナマケモノ, Namakemono)
Voiced by: Kishō Taniyama
A three-toed sloth who lives in the café's outskirts. True to his character, he has a very slow pace and speech.
Full Time Panda (常勤パンダ, Jōkin Panda)
Voiced by: Katsuyuki Konishi
An older giant panda who, until episode 44, worked full time at the zoo alongside Panda, not including his part-time job as a tissue-pack distributor. He is married and father of five, working hard to make ends meet for his family. He has since been transferred to a zoo in Singapore.
Penko (ペン子)
Voiced by: Sayuri Yahagi
A female penguin who works at a bakery near the Polar Bear's Cafe and Penguin's love interest. However, when Penguin finally confesses, it turns out that Penko is only one among seven identical sisters taking shifts at the bakery. Aside Penko, the other six are called Penmi (ペン美), Penna (ペン奈), Penka (ペン花), Penuelle (ペンニュエル, Pennyueru), Penno (ペン乃), and Penjolina (ペンジョリーナ, Penjorīna). Somehow Penguin started dating all seven at once, although he has a hard time dealing with them as he is unable to differentiate each one from the others, but when the girls make an ultimatum for Penguin to choose one among them, they realize that none of his traits are particularly interesting and dump him.
Tortoise (ゾウガメ, Zōgame)
Voiced by: Takayuki Kondo
A Galapagos tortoise who is a regular at the cafe. Has a very slow speech and pace.
Mei Mei (メイメイ)
Voiced by: Kana Hanazawa
Panda's little sister with a crush on Handa, whom she deems as handsome as a prince due to his short and chubby panda-like figure. She doesn't prefer Mr. Rintarou, despite his love for pandas, because she claims he is too skinny for her type.
Lesser Panda (レッサーパンダ, Ressā Panda)
Voiced by: Akiko Yajima
A red panda who usually looks up to Panda despite being far more capable and reliable than him.
Adélie, Chinstrap, Gentoo (アデリーペンギン、アゴヒモペンギン、ジェンツーペンギン, Aderī Pengin, Agohimo Pengin, Jentsū Pengin)
Voiced by: Katsuyuki Konishi, Tomokazu Sugita, and Daisuke Hirakawa respectively
Three penguins each representing a member of the genus Pygoscelis who come with a plan to have people learn the differences between the different species of penguins by developing a deck of penguin-related cards. The cards do not sell very well, but the penguins find more success with South Pole Squad: Penguinger, an action play at the zoo.
Mandrill (マンドリル, Mandoriru)
Voiced by: Yosuke Ito
A mandrill who works at the zoo and visits the café.
Anteater (コアリクイ, Koarikui)
Voiced by: Yuuki Fujiwara
A tamandua who works at the zoo and occasionally visits the café.
Badger (アナグマ, Anaguma)
Voiced by: Kōki Miyata
A japanese badger that applies for the part time job at Polar Bear's Café but was rejected. In the anime he complains of his living arrangements, as he cannot burrow in his wooden floored apartment.
Tree Kangaroo (キノボリカンガルー, Kinobori Kangarū)
Voiced by: Toshio Furukawa
A tree-kangaroo, coffee specialist, and owner of Tree-Climbing Coffee (キノボリコーヒー, Kinobori Kōhī) who provides coffee beans to Polar Bear's Café.
The Red Squirrels (エゾリスたち, Ezorisu-tachi)
Voiced by: Kōki Miyata (Mama), Hiro Nakajima, Aki Nakajima
A group of red squirrels who work at Tree-Climbing Coffee by selecting the coffee beans Tree Kangaroo roasts. The leader is the mother of the others, and is referred to as Red Squirrel Mama (エゾリスママ, Ezorisu Mama; alternatively Ezorisu-Haha (エゾリス母), Ezorisu Kaa-chan (エゾリス母ちゃん), and Ezorisu-Okan (エゾリスおかん)).
Wolf (オオカミ, Ōkami), Tiger (トラ, Tora), and Lion (ライオン, Raion)
Voiced by: Tomokazu Sugita, Kishō Taniyama, and Kazuhiko Inoue respectively
Three tenants of Grizzly's Bar who are huge fans of Polar Bear from the time he was a rapper known as "MC 469MA" ("469MA" is read as "Shirokuma").
Black Caiman (クロカイマン, Kuro Kaiman)
Voiced by: Kishō Taniyama
A black caiman who is a regular customer at Grizzly's Bar The Grizzly. When he first sees Panda, he calls him delicious before being spurned by Grizzly.
King Penguin (キングペンギン, Kingu Pengin)
Voiced by: Nobuyuki Hiyama
A king penguin who gets really upset when it is confused with Emperor Penguins, like Penguin, and a good friend of Panda-Mama. King Penguin's gender is left ambiguous (voice actor Hiyama is a man), but it uses the feminine personal pronoun atashi (あたし) to refer to itself, a trait shared with Panda Mama and Red Squirrel Mama.
Emperor Chick (コウテイ ヒナ, Kōtei Hina)
Voiced by: Ai Nonaka
An emperor penguin chick who is Penguin's nephew. He often plays train with King Chick.
King Chick (キング ヒナ, Kingu Hina)
Voiced by: Junko Takeuchi
A king penguin chick who is King Penguin's son. The fact that king penguin chicks do not look as cute as emperor penguin chicks is a running gag.
Grizzly's Mother (グリズリーの母, Gurizurī no Haha)
Voiced by: Kikuko Inoue
Grizzly's mother. When remembering her, Grizzly says that she was very scary when she was angry.
Crested Serpent Eagle (カンムリワシ, Kanmuriwashi)
Voiced by: Akio Suyama
Sea Otter (ラッコ, Rakko)
Voiced by: Kōki Miyata
A popular animal working at the zoo who while at the cafe complains that smashing shells on rocks is hard work.
Tapir (バク, Baku)
Voiced by: Yosuke Ito
Another worker at the zoo whom everyone believes eats dreams because of the Baku myth.
Rintaro Hayashi (林 厘太郎, Hayashi Rintarō)
Voiced by: Tokuyoshi Kawashima
A flower shop owner who is nicknamed Rin-Rin (リンリン) and is incredibly fond of Panda (and pandas in general). Although he is considered attractive by many female customers, Panda seems to not be interested in him. His intense love for pandas annoyed one school girl once.
Kirino (桐野)
Voiced by: Takayuki Kondo
One of the workers at the zoo Panda works at. He works under Handa.
Masaki (マサキ)
Voiced by: Hiro Shimono
A visitor of the café who becomes so moved by the taste of its black coffee that he decides to study under a tree kangaroo to learn how to roast coffee beans.

== Media ==
=== Manga ===
The original manga by Aloha Higa began serialisation in Shogakukan's Josei manga magazine Flowers from 2006 to 2013. Five tankōbon volumes have been released. The manga went on hiatus between May and July 2012, citing lack of communication concerning the anime adaptation.

The manga returned from hiatus in the September 2012 issue of Flowers, following Higa managing to talk with the anime production on her intellectual property. The manga was retitled Shirokuma Cafe Today's Special and moved to Shueisha's Josei manga magazine Cocohana in September 2014. The manga is licensed in North America by Seven Seas Entertainment.

=== Anime ===
An anime adaptation by Studio Pierrot aired in Japan on TV Tokyo between April 5, 2012, and March 28, 2013, and was simulcast by Crunchyroll.

The opening themes are "Boku ni Invitation (ボクにインビテーション, Boku ni Inbitēshon; Invitation to Me) by JP (episodes 1-26), "Rough & Laugh" by Clammbon (episodes 27–38), and "You & Me" by Rie fu and Saki (Episode 39 onwards). The ending themes in order are "Bamboo Scramble" by Jun Fukuyama (episodes 1–5), "Grizzly-san no G-Rock" (グリズリーさんのG☆ROCK; "Mr Grizzly's G-Rock") by Yuichi Nakamura, "Mizuiro" (みずいろ; Light Blue) by Aya Endō, "Zootto, ne♪" (ZOOっと、ね♪; "Always With Zoo") by Katsuyuki Konishi, "Michinoku Shiku Blues" (みちのく飼育ブルース, Michinoku Shiku Burūsu; Michinoku Raising Blues) by Wataru Hatano, "Zokkon! Penko-san" (ぞっこん！ペン子さん) by Hiroshi Kamiya, "Kimama ni Panda-Mama" (気ままにパンダママ; "The Indulgent Panda-Mama") by Toshiyuki Morikawa, "Llama-san no Llama Mambo" (ラマさんのラママンボ, Rama-san no Rama Manbo; "Mr. Llama's Llama Mambo") by Daisuke Ono, "Largo" (ラルゴ, Rarugo) by Kishō Taniyama, "Bamboo Rendezvous" (バンブー・ランデヴー♥, Banbū Randebū) by Kana Hanazawa, "Pandaholic!!" by Tokuyoshi Kawashima, and "My Dear" by Takahiro Sakurai.

==== Episode list ====
No.	Title	Original release date
1	"Welcome to the Polar Bear Café"; Transliteration: "Shirokuma Kafe e Yōkoso" (Japanese: しろくまカフェへようこそ)	April 5, 2012
1	"Panda-kun's Employment"; Transliteration: "Panda-kun no Shūshoku" (Japanese: パンダくんの就職)	April 5, 2012
Pushed by his mother to stop lazing around the house, a Panda searches for a part-time job but has troubling finding one to accommodate his laziness. He soon stumbles upon Polar Bear Café, run by a Polar Bear who is holding interviews for a part-time position with his faithful customer Penguin. Panda applies for the job but fails the interview, with the job instead going to a human girl named Sasako. However, the others soon point Panda towards a part-time job at a nearby zoo.
2	"Everyone's Café"; Transliteration: "Minna no Kafe" (Japanese: みんなのカフェ)	April 12, 2012
2	"The Café's Flower-viewing Party"; Transliteration: "Kafe no Ohanami" (Japanese: カフェのお花見)	April 12, 2012
Panda, Penguin and Llama come up with ideas for if they ran their own café. Later, everyone goes to a flower viewing party where Penguin gets very drunk and goes on about a penguin he likes.
3	"Polar Bear at the Zoo"; Transliteration: "Shirokuma-kun Dōbutsuen e" (Japanese: シロクマくん動物園へ)	April 19, 2012
3	"Panda's Problems"; Transliteration: "Panda-kun no Nayami" (Japanese: パンダくんの悩み)	April 19, 2012
Polar Bear and Penguin come to the zoo Panda works at, where they have trouble catching Panda when he's awake and visiting the other attractions. Later, Panda and the other animals discuss the problems they face doing their jobs.
4	"Obsessed with Smartphones"; Transliteration: "Sumafo ni Muchū" (Japanese: スマフォに夢中)	April 26, 2012
4	"Super Fun Drive Lesson"; Transliteration: "Wakuwaku Doraibu Ressun" (Japanese: わくわくドライブレッスン)	April 26, 2012
After seeing everyone with smartphones, Panda convinces his mother to buy him one, only for him to soon break the panda cover it had. Polar Bear cheers Panda up by making him an origami panda cover, only for him to end breaking the actual phone. Wanting to learn some driving techniques, Penguin joins Polar Bear and Panda on a drive.
5	"Panda gets Enthusiastic"; Transliteration: "Panda-kun Harikiru" (Japanese: パンダくん張り切る)	May 3, 2012
5	"Everyone's Parfait"; Transliteration: "Minna no Pafe" (Japanese: みんなのパフェ)	May 3, 2012
As Panda has to fill in for the full-time panda for a week, he is forced to ride packed trains for work. He cheers up and becomes more energetic when he starts receiving flowers from a supposed fan named Rin-Rin, only to later learn it was the male flower shop owner, Rintaro Hayashi. Later, Polar Bear decides to do a parfait fair and tries to come up with some special parfaits to serve.
6	"Panda's Diet"; Transliteration: "Panda-kun no Daietto" (Japanese: パンダくんのダイエット)	May 10, 2012
6	"Strive for it! Wild Panda"; Transliteration: "Mezase! Wairudo Panda" (Japanese: 目指せ！ワイルドパンダ)	May 10, 2012
Following an incident at work, Panda feels he is overweight and decides to go on a diet. Later, Panda decides he needs to get in touch with his wild side, so Polar Bear takes him to meet his childhood friend, Grizzly, who runs a bar.
7	"Mr. Handa's Makeover Plan"; Transliteration: "Handa-san Kaizō Keikaku" (Japanese: 半田さん改造計画)	May 17, 2012
7	"The Great Love Love Driving Operation"; Transliteration: "Rabu Rabu Doraibu Daisakusen" (Japanese: ラブラブドライブ大作戦)	May 17, 2012
Feeling he could do with being more popular, Panda decides to give Handa a makeover, although it ends up turning into a day out with Handa paying for everything. Having received his driving license, Penguin is tested by Polar Bear to try to achieve his 'dating license'.
8	"A Magazine Interview Comes By"; Transliteration: "Zasshi Shuzai ga Yattekita" (Japanese: 雑誌取材がやってきた)	May 24, 2012
8	"Salmon Hunter: Mr. Grizzly"; Transliteration: "Sake Hantā: Gurizurī-san" (Japanese: サケハンター・グリズリーさん)	May 24, 2012
Polar Bear is interviewed about his café by a magazine headed up by the editor who is a Shoebill. Later, Panda joins Polar Bear and Grizzly to catch some ingredients.
9	"Rin Rin Deeply Moved! Panda's House!"; Transliteration: "Rin Rin Kangeki! Panda-kun Chi!" (Japanese: リンリン感激！パンダくんち！)	May 31, 2012
9	"Mr. Penguin's Confession"; Transliteration: "Pengin-san no Kokuhaku" (Japanese: ペンギンさんの告白)	May 31, 2012
Rintaro gets excited when he gets to make a delivery to Panda's house and meet his family. Later, the others try to support Penguin as he tries to work up the courage to confess to Penko.
10	"Mr. Handa's Mixer?"; Transliteration: "Handa-san no Gōkon?" (Japanese: 半田さんの合コン？)	June 7, 2012
10	"Mr. Handa's Mixer!"; Transliteration: "Handa-san no Gōkon!" (Japanese: 半田さんの合コン！)	June 7, 2012
Thanks to Panda's interference, Handa is set up by his fellow employee, Kirino, to go on a mixer to meet some girls. When one of the guys cancels, Panda and Polar Bear fill in for the guy's side. However, the girls become more interested in Panda than they are in Handa.
11	"Mr. Penguin's Heartbreak"; Transliteration: "Pengin-san no Shitsuren" (Japanese: ペンギンさんの失恋)	June 14, 2012
11	"Panda's Night Out"; Transliteration: "Panda-kun no Yoasobi" (Japanese: パンダくんの夜遊び)	June 14, 2012
Penguin gets heartbroken when he assumes Penko is dating Tortoise. Later, Panda joins Polar Bear and Grizzly on a night out, visiting a batting center and a public bath.
12	"Panda, Tired of Boredom"; Transliteration: "Panda-kun, Hima ni Komaru" (Japanese: パンダくん、ヒマに困る)	June 21, 2012
12	"Panda's Advice Room for Troubles"; Transliteration: "Panda-kun no Nayami Sōdanshitsu" (Japanese: パンダの悩み相談室)	June 21, 2012
Panda and the Full-time Panda attempt to distract themselves during a boring and rainy day at the zoo, much to Handa's chagrin. Later, Handa asks his love life once again but finds some peace during his first visit to Polar Bear Café.
13	"Tanabata Decoration"; Transliteration: "Tanabata Kazari" (Japanese: 七夕飾り)	June 28, 2012
13	"Panda's Wish"; Transliteration: "Panda-kun no Negai" (Japanese: パンダくんの願い)	June 28, 2012
As the café prepares for Tanabata, everyone has trouble deciding what they should wish for. Noticing Handa seems to have a crush on Sasako, Panda tries to help him work up his confidence.
14	"Enthusiastic Polar Bear"; Transliteration: "Shirokuma-kun Harikiru" (Japanese: シロクマくん張り切る)	July 5, 2012
14	"Let's Go to the Beach!"; Transliteration: "Umi ni Ikō!" (Japanese: 海に行こう！)	July 5, 2012
As Panda laments having nothing to do whilst Polar Bear wishes he had more free time, Polar Bear takes Panda's place at the zoo pretending to be a panda, proving to be a hit. Later, Polar Bear, Panda and Penguin take a trip to the beach.
15	"Weeding in the Summer"; Transliteration: "Manatsu no Zassōtori" (Japanese: 真夏の雑草取り)	July 12, 2012
15	"Mr. Penguin's Romance"; Transliteration: "Pengin-san no Romansu" (Japanese: ペンギンさんのロマンス)	July 12, 2012
The backyard of the Polar Bear's Café needs weeding, but Penguin seems to be the only one taking things seriously. Later, Penguin finally works up the courage to confess to Penko, asking her out every day for a week. However, it turns out he inadvertently asked out seven identical girl penguins, leading to disaster when they all show up on the day.
16	"Mr. Grizzly Goes On an Adventure"; Transliteration: "Gurizurī-san Tabidatsu" (Japanese: グリズリーさん旅立つ)	July 19, 2012
16	"A Strange Restaurant"; Transliteration: "Mishiranu Omise" (Japanese: 見知らぬお店)	July 19, 2012
As the café starts serving a shaved ice dessert called "Polar Bear", Grizzly gets the wrong idea and believes Polar Bear had been eaten by otters. Later, a salaryman from another town arrives at Polar Bear Café for the first time and is astounded by the various customers.
17	"Let's Go Camping!"; Transliteration: "Kyanpu ni Ikō!" (Japanese: キャンプに行こう！)	July 26, 2012
17	"Rin Rin and the High School Girl"; Transliteration: "Joshikōsei to Rin Rin" (Japanese: 女子高生とリンリン)	July 26, 2012
Polar Bear, Panda, Penguin, and Grizzly go on a camping trip together, where Penguin and Grizzly find they have a lot in common whilst trying to keep Polar Bear and Panda in check. Later, Rin Rin asks a high school girl to accompany him to the zoo; the girl accepts, believing it to be a date, only to find that he just wanted someone to talk to about how cute Panda is.
18	"The Café's Ghost Stories"; Transliteration: "Kafe no Kaidan" (Japanese: カフェの怪談)	August 2, 2012
18	"Panda Runs Away From Home"; Transliteration: "Panda-kun no Iede" (Japanese: パンダくんの家出)	August 2, 2012
The café decides to hold a night of telling ghost stories, much to an easily-frighted Handa's dismay. Later, Panda decides to run away from home when his mother decides to lump his birthday celebration with his siblings.
19	"There Are Many Kinds of Penguin"; Transliteration: "Pengin ni mo Iroiro Aru yo" (Japanese: ペンギンにも色々あるよ)	August 9, 2012
19	"What is "Baisen"!?"; Transliteration: "Baisen-tte Nanda!?" (Japanese: バイセンってナンダ！？)	August 9, 2012
Polar Bear, Panda, and Penguin go to a water park. Penguin takes along his nephew, but ends up being cowed by Mama King Penguin, while her son and Penguin's nephew become fast friends. The Penko sisters have also tailed Penguin there, while Panda is on the receiving end of King Penguin Mama's grousing about how emperor penguins (like Penguin) are considered superior — and a trio of Pygoscelis penguins out to sell penguin cards. On the other hand, Sasako rode the train too far and arrives late at the water park. After becoming amazed by the taste of Polar Bear's Café's brand of black coffee, a man named Masaki decides to become the pupil of a tree kangaroo to learn how to roast coffee beans.
20	"The Ideal Single Life"; Transliteration: "Akogare no Hitorigurashi" (Japanese: 憧れの一人暮らし)	August 16, 2012
20	"Summer Festival"; Transliteration: "Natsu no Omatsuri" (Japanese: 夏のお祭り)	August 16, 2012
Panda imagines a dream life living on his own. After struggling to find a place that meets his expectations, Panda, along with Penguin, check out where the other animals live. Later, Polar Bear and Grizzly run a stand together at a summer festival, joined by Panda's relative, Lesser Panda. After selling everything, the gang enjoy the sights of the festival.
21	"Panda is No Longer a Panda"; Transliteration: "Panda-kun Panda Janakunaru" (Japanese: パンダくんパンダじゃなくなる)	August 23, 2012
21	"MeiMei's Prince"; Transliteration: "MeiMei no Ōji-sama" (Japanese: メイメイの王子様)	August 23, 2012
Panda is reassigned to one part of the zoo after another — even serving as a zookeeper. Later, Panda's sister Mei Mei goes on about her crush on Mr. Handa. However, after seeing Handa and Ms Badger at a realty office, Panda believes that the two are getting married.
22	"Sales Penguin"; Transliteration: "Eigyō Pengin" (Japanese: 営業ペンギン)	August 30, 2012
22	"Mr. Penguin's Picnic"; Transliteration: "Pengin-san no Pikunikku" (Japanese: ペンギンさんのピクニック)	August 30, 2012
The trio of Pygoscelis penguins from the water park try to figure out how to sell their excess of penguin cards, eventually settling on creating a concentration game with them, which becomes a hit. Meanwhile, Penguin ends up having to date all the Penko sisters equally, but still has trouble telling them apart. Sasako suggests he give the sisters differently coloured ribbons to better identify them, but it backfires when they decide to trade them with each other.
23	"Mr. Handa's Discussion"; Transliteration: "Handa-san no Sōdan" (Japanese: 半田さんの相談)	September 6, 2012
23	"Panda Mama's Daily Life"; Transliteration: "Panda Mama no Nichijō" (Japanese: パンダママの日常)	September 6, 2012
Mr. Handa meets up with Polar Bear to ask his advice on how to ask Sasako out, but Polar Bear seems to be more interested in the food where the meeting takes place. Meanwhile, Sasako winds up serving several good-looking men who come into the café, which worries Panda and Penguin. Later, Panda Mama goes to buy walnuts and learns the trick of stuffing the bag full from Mama Red Squirrel, and then endures a lecture from King Penguin Mama on how to eat at an all-you-can-eat cake buffet. The group then decides to eat at Polar Bear Café, where they end up taxing his sanity.
24	"Panda's Apprenticeship"; Transliteration: "Panda-kun no Deshiiri" (Japanese: パンダくんの弟子入り)	September 13, 2012
24	"A Sports Day Filled With Animals"; Transliteration: "Dōbutsu Darake no Undōkai" (Japanese: 動物だらけの運動会)	September 13, 2012
Panda decides he wants to become someone's apprentice but is rather picky about who his master is. He eventually settles on becoming Sloth's apprentice, but quits due to not being able match his levels of laziness. Later, Polar Bear abruptly tasks Sasako with being the emcee of a sport competition for animals (in which Handa is the only human participant), while Panda Mama and Mama Red Squirrel quarrel over how to prepare rice balls.
25	"Mr. Penguin's Hobbies"; Transliteration: "Pengin-san no Shumi" (Japanese: ペンギンさんの趣味)	September 20, 2012
25	"Their Boyhood Days"; Transliteration: "Futari no Shōnen Jidai" (Japanese: 二人の少年時代)	September 20, 2012
Penguin puts on an art exhibition, although none of the paintings are original and go unappreciated by the customers. After Polar Bear and Panda see the exhibit, Penguin gets involved in a discussion of what hobbies they have. Later, as Polar Bear gets Grizzly to help out with a few things, he tells about how they first met.
26	"The New Panda"; Transliteration: "Atarashī Panda" (Japanese: 新しいパンダ)	September 27, 2012
26	"Reunion at Grizzly Bar"; Transliteration: "Gurizurī Bā no Dōsōkai" (Japanese: グリズリーバーの同窓会)	September 27, 2012
As Full Time Panda takes on a side job, he starts to worry when he learns a temp Panda will be coming to the zoo, feeling he might be replaced. As Temp Panda arrives and acts rather sternly towards the other pandas, a ballot is held as to whom should be the central panda. Full Time Panda comes in last, though Temp Panda moves onto another site regardless. Meanwhile at Grizzly Bar, a Tiger, Wolf and Lion have a little reunion. As they lament how they've lost their youth, Polar Bear, who used to be a rap artist (469MA), gives them a surprise performance as a present.
27	"Animal Field Baseball"; Transliteration: "Animaru Kusa Yakyū" (Japanese: アニマル草野球)	October 4, 2012
27	"What's Jacu Coffee!?"; Transliteration: "Jakū Kōhītte Nanda!?" (Japanese: ジャクーコーヒーってナンダ！？)	October 4, 2012
The zoo animals from the Polar Bear's Cafe and the wild animals from Grizzly's bar face off against each other in a baseball match. At the beginning, the zoo team starts to struggle due to some of the animals getting easily distracted. However, Polar Bear manages to win the match by having all the Red Squirrels bat, guaranteeing ball runs. During the interval, the Red Squirrels teach Masaki about how coffee changes taste depending on how much it has been roasted, and he learns from Tree Kangaroo the unpleasant secret behind his favourite coffee, the "Jacu Coffee".
28	"Panda's Apology"; Transliteration: "Panda-kun no Owabi" (Japanese: パンダくんのおわび)	October 11, 2012
28	"RinRin is Invited"; Transliteration: "RinRin, Manekareru" (Japanese: リンリン、招かれる)	October 11, 2012
Polar Bear attempts to fill in for Panda but is questioned by the police. As expiation, Panda decides to give Polar Bear a day-off by working at the café in his place, but it is not as easy as he thinks. Meanwhile, Rin Rin is invited out drinking by Full Time Panda, who is curious as to why he considers Panda to be cute but not him.
29	"Panda's New Part Time Job"; Transliteration: "Panda-kun no Atarashii Baito" (Japanese: パンダくんの新しいバイト)	October 18, 2012
29	"Mr. Penguin Goes Flying"; Transliteration: "Soratobu Pengin-san" (Japanese: 空飛ぶペンギンさん)	October 18, 2012
Panda goes through various part-time jobs, including a car dealership, a stock marketer and a lecturer, where he somehow manages to make the respective companies successful and even become a CEO. Later, Penguin has aspirations of flight so the others try various attempts to get him airborne.
30	"Halloween"; Transliteration: "Harowīn" (Japanese: ハロウィーン)	October 25, 2012
30	"Llama Day"; Transliteration: "Rama Dē" (Japanese: ラマデー)	October 25, 2012
Polar Bear, Panda, and Penguin go trick-or-treat on Halloween, getting some curious treats from the homes they visit. Tired of being passed over all the time, Llama suggests the zoo should celebrate a Llama Day. However, the animals struggle with coming up with ideas to make Llama more appealing.
31	"Mr Penguin's Dilemma"; Transliteration: "Pengin-san no Shuraba" (Japanese: ペンギンさんの修羅場)	November 1, 2012
31	"Porcupine the Idol"; Transliteration: "Aidoru Yama Arashi" (Japanese: アイドル・ヤマアラシ)	November 1, 2012
As Penguin is put under the pressure to choose one of the Penko sisters, Llama helps him to differentiate between them, but this soon backfires. When the pressure builds, Panda questions the Penko sisters on why they like Penguin, leading them to realise they don't like Penguin after all. Later, Panda Mama goes with King Penguin Mama to a concert by porcupine pop group Yama Arashi, which is based on the Japanese pop star group Arashi.
32	"The Café Garden"; Transliteration: "Kafe no Niwa" (Japanese: カフェの庭)	November 8, 2012
32	"Sales Penguin's Sales"; Transliteration: "Eigyō Pengin no Eigyō" (Japanese: 営業ペンギンの営業)	November 8, 2012
Polar Bear takes the others to see the café's garden where all the ingredients are grown. Meanwhile, the sales penguins attempt to pitch their penguin trading card game to Handa so they can sell it in the zoo's shop, even suggesting they host a penguin-themed hero show to attract customers.
33	"Panda Corner's Contest"; Transliteration: "Panda Kōnā no Kontesuto" (Japanese: パンダコーナーのコンテスト)	November 15, 2012
33	"Coffee Roaster Masaki"; Transliteration: "Baisenshi Masaki" (Japanese: 焙煎士マサキ)	November 15, 2012
33	"Panda Corner's Project"; Transliteration: "Panda Kōnā no Kikaku" (Japanese: パンダコーナーの企画)	November 15, 2012
Panda becomes depressed as the penguin hero show appears to take customers away from the panda corner. Rin-Rin suggests to Panda that the zoo put on a photo contest to attract more customers. Meanwhile, Masaki has a go at roasting coffee, learning the meaning behind hand picking coffee beans. Despite some initial interest in the photo contest, the panda corner is still overshadowed by the penguin show, which Penguin also participates in. Thus Polar Bear suggests the Panda family put on their own performance, which proves to be a big hit.
34	"Wolf's Occupation Change"; Transliteration: "Ōkami-kun no Tenshoku" (Japanese: オオカミくんの転職)	November 22, 2012
34	"Mr. Penguin's New Love"; Transliteration: "Pengin-san no Atarashī Koi" (Japanese: ペンギンさんの新しい恋)	November 22, 2012
Wolf ends up quitting his job at a bakery, so Tiger recruits him for his sweets shops. After Wolf hears about a position at a famous bakery from Panda-Mama, Tiger encourages Wolf to go for it, and he manages to get the job. Later, the gang hear from Llama that Penguin has been visiting the neighbouring town's Brown Bear Café. As Polar Bear decides to check it out, he learns Penguin has gained a crush on the waitress penguin there, deciding not to come to Polar Bear Café until he works up the courage to ask her out. He eventually confesses but gets rejected, thus returning to Polar Bear Café.
35	"Sloth Wants to Work"; Transliteration: "Hatarakitai Namakemono-kun" (Japanese: 働きたいナマケモノくん)	November 29, 2012
35	"Mr. Handa's Present"; Transliteration: "Handa-san no Purezento" (Japanese: 半田さんのプレゼント)	November 29, 2012
Sloth starts working part-time at the café, which does not prove easy with his speed. When asked why Sloth wants to work, he says he wants to buy Sasako dinner to repay her for all of her help, though Sasako says she needn't do so as he was the one who helped get her job in the first place. Later, Handa asks for Polar Bear and Lesser Panda's help in figuring out what to get Sasako for Christmas. Despite their failed plans, Handa manages to think of something and ends up giving it to Sasako when he runs into her.
36	"Grizzly's Hibernation Preparation"; Transliteration: "Gurizurī-kun no Tōmin Junbi" (Japanese: グリズリーくんの冬眠準備)	December 6, 2012
36	"Grizzly's Hibernation"; Transliteration: "Gurizurī-kun no Tōmin" (Japanese: グリズリーくんの冬眠)	December 6, 2012
The pandas look for ways to hibernate at the zoo, but Handa calls them out on it. Grizzly takes Polar Bear shopping for a pillow to sleep on during hibernation, but Polar Bear doesn't seem to be interested in that. When Grizzly does get to hibernate, he is rudely interrupted by Polar Bear, who takes him to the driving range. When Panda and Penguin turn up, Grizzly, cranky from lack of sleep, takes them all out to a hot pot bistro.
37	"Christmas Planning"; Transliteration: "Kurisumasu Keikaku" (Japanese: クリスマス計画)	December 13, 2012
37	"Christmas Trouble"; Transliteration: "Kurisumasu Sōdō" (Japanese: クリスマス騒動)	December 13, 2012
Panda wonders whether he will get a present for Christmas until Rin Rin shows up with a knitted pochette for Panda, which the latter accepts reluctantly. Eager to show off his storytelling, Penguin tries in vain to find a party to appear at before deciding on Bar the Grizzly. Panda and Mei Mei argue over whose picture should be sent to Handa as a Christmas present, which Llama and Alpaca use their wool to create scarves and other garments.
38	"Big Cleaning at the Café"; Transliteration: "Kafe no Ōsōji" (Japanese: カフェの大掃除)	December 20, 2012
38	"For Whom Does the Bell Toll?"; Transliteration: "Dare ga Tame ni Kane wa Naru?" (Japanese: 誰が為に鐘は鳴る？)	December 20, 2012
Polar Bear ropes in everyone to do some spring cleaning around the cafe before Panda-Mama brings a salmon for everyone to have hotpot. Later, Polar Bear, Panda, Penguin, Sasako, and Llama spend New Year's Eve together where they reminisce about the past year. They are soon joined by the other animals to see the New Year in.
39	"The Animals' Hidden Talent Contest"; Transliteration: "Dōbutsu-tachi no Kakushigei Taikai" (Japanese: 動物達のかくし芸大会)	January 10, 2013
39	"New Year's Guest"; Transliteration: "Shinnen no Okyaku-san" (Japanese: 新年のお客さん)	January 10, 2013
As the New Year rolls in, the Polar Bear's Cafe holds a hidden talent contest. Later, Penguin comes to visit Panda's home whilst the cafe is closed, which does not impress Panda very much.
40	"The Hammock Sea"; Transliteration: "Hanmokku no Umi" (Japanese: ハンモックの海)	January 17, 2013
40	"Panda-Mama's Gardening"; Transliteration: "Panda-Mama no Gādeningu" (Japanese: パンダママのガーデニング)	January 17, 2013
Polar Bear sets up a hammock in his garden and invites Panda and Penguin to laze around with him. Later, after Panda upsets Panda-Mama by eating her tulips, he tries and find something to replace them.
41	"Scattering Beans With Everyone"; Transliteration: "Minna de Mamemaki" (Japanese: みんなで豆まき)	January 24, 2013
41	"Café in the Afternoon"; Transliteration: "Gogo no Kafe" (Japanese: 午後のカフェ)	January 24, 2013
The café celebrates Setsubun where everyone takes turns being the ogre. Later, Sasako and Llama reminisce about their elementary school days.
42	"Polar Bear's Insomnia"; Transliteration: "Shirokuma-kun no Fumishō" (Japanese: シロクマくんの不眠症)	January 31, 2013
42	"Grizzly's First Love"; Transliteration: "Gurizurī-kun no Hatsukoi" (Japanese: グリズリーくんの初恋)	January 31, 2013
The gang try to help Polar Bear as he has trouble sleeping due to insomnia. Later, Polar Bear and Grizzly reminisce their high school days, where Grizzly had a crush on an Asiatic black bear named Tsukiko. After learning Tsukiko's family was moving, Grizzly helped her find her missing school badge.
43	"Pun Café"; Transliteration: "Dajare Kafe" (Japanese: ダジャレカフェ)	February 7, 2013
43	"The Secret to Delicious Coffee"; Transliteration: "Kōhī no Oishi-sa no Himitsu" (Japanese: コーヒーのおいしさの秘密)	February 7, 2013
43	"Mr. Full-time Panda, Mr. Llama and Rin-Rin"; Transliteration: "Jōkin-san to Rama-san to RinRin" (Japanese: 常勤さんとラマさんとリンリン)	February 7, 2013
Fed up with Polar Bear's annoying puns, Grizzly and Penguin try to get everyone in town to beat Polar Bear at his own game. Later, Masaki is told how coffee can taste different depending on its preparation and wonders if he can win over the Red Squirrels with advice from Polar Bear. After a long day of work, Mr. Full-time Panda and Mr. Llama decide to have a few drinks. They later invite Rin Rin, who takes the drunk Panda and Llama to Grizzly's bar, where everyone there gets drunk into the morning.
44	"The Everyday Zoo"; Transliteration: "Itsumademo Dōbutsuen" (Japanese: いつまでも動物園)	February 14, 2013
44	"The Zoo in the Rain"; Transliteration: "Ame no Dōbutsuen" (Japanese: 雨の動物園)	February 14, 2013
After spending the previous day spending time together with him, Panda is shocked to learn that Full-Time Panda has been transferred to a zoo in Singapore, leaving behind a letter expressing his thanks for all the times they spent together. Despite being incredibly saddened by Full-Time Panda's departure, he agrees to work full-time until another panda is hired, causing some worry amongst his friends. When a Valentine's Day couple end up insulting Panda after two weeks of straight work, Penguin stands up against them. Panda soon cheers up after a new part-time panda is found and gives his thanks to Penguin.
45	"Rin Rin and Mei Mei's Heartbeating Plan"; Transliteration: "Rinrin to Meimei no Doki-doki Daisakusen" (Japanese: リンリンとメイメイのドキドキ大作戦)	February 21, 2013
45	"Smelt Fishing"; Transliteration: "Wakasagi Tsuri" (Japanese: ワカサギ釣り)	February 21, 2013
Rin Rin and Mei Mei find they have some common interests and work together to think of a plan to get closer to Panda and Handa. However, Rin Rin ends up catching a fever, so Mei Mei decides to instead look after him. Later, Polar Bear and the others go to the frozen lakes to do some smelt fishing, only to get distracted. After Grizzly helps to catch a whole bunch, Polar Bear sets up an igloo cafe to make use of their ingredients.
46	"Doll Festival"; Transliteration: "Hinamatsuri" (Japanese: ひなまつり)	February 28, 2013
46	"The Animal Doctor"; Transliteration: "Dōbutsu no Oisha-san" (Japanese: 動物のお医者さん)	February 28, 2013
The younger penguins set up a display for Hinamatsuri, which goes a little awry when the cafe-goers make their own contributions. Grizzly is called in to help them set it up, only to realise that there are no girls around to celebrate it apart from Sasako. Later, Polar Bear develops a fever and goes to the animal hospital for some medicine. Panda and Penguin decide to come over to look after him, only to end up catching fever themselves.
47	"South Pole Squad Penguinger"; Transliteration: "Nankyoku Sentai Penginjā" (Japanese: 南極戦隊ペンギンジャー)	March 7, 2013
47	"Even More, What is Roasting!?"; Transliteration: "Madamada Baisen-tte Nanda!?" (Japanese: まだまだ焙煎ってナンダ！？)	March 7, 2013
The Pygoscelis Penguins are approached by a TV studio to do a televised version of South Pole Squad Penginger alongside Yama Arashi, with some of the other animals making cameos. The segment follows the Penguingers as they fight to rescue Yama Arashi from the evil Emperor Penguin. The broadcast is a hit and helps make the zoo more popular. Meanwhile, Polar Bear teaches Masaki how a coffee's richness differs based on how it is prepared. He later learns Tree Kangaroo will let him start roasting his own coffee beans.
48	"Sloth's Trip"; Transliteration: "Namekemono-kun no Ryokō" (Japanese: ナマケモノくんの旅行)	March 14, 2013
48	"I Became a Doll"; Transliteration: "Ningyō ni Natta" (Japanese: 人形になった)	March 14, 2013
48	"White Day"; Transliteration: "Howaito Dē" (Japanese: ホワイトデー)	March 14, 2013
The animals go on a long walk to the hot springs where Sloth wants to get there on his own two feet. Later, the group become paper dolls as they interact in the real world. Meanwhile, Handa tries to figure out what to give Sasako for White Day.
49	"Mr. Grizzly's Reunion"; Transliteration: "Gurizurī-san no Saikai" (Japanese: グリズリーさんの再会)	March 21, 2013
49	"Mr Llama's Time Capsule"; Transliteration: "Rama-san no Taimu Kapsuru" (Japanese: ラマさんのタイムカプセル)	March 21, 2013
Grizzly is visited by his mother, who embarrasses him a little when she starts serving home cooking in his bar. After trying it for himself, it soon turns out to be a big hit. Later, the others visit their hometown to find a time capsule Llama buried five years ago. Upon arriving, they discover the tree he buried it under is in the middle of a private property. Luckily, they allow Badger to dig under the property and retrieve the time capsule. Inside, they find an audio cassette featuring a song sung by Llama's childhood self.
50	"Mr. Penguin's Secret"; Transliteration: "Pengin-san no Himitsu" (Japanese: ペンギンさんの秘密)	March 28, 2013
50	"Flower-viewing in Spring"; Transliteration: "Haru no Ohanami" (Japanese: 春のお花見)	March 28, 2013
Panda becomes curious about what Penguin does when he is not at the café. Although his investigation does not help him learn Penguin's secrets, he learns new things about some of the other animals. Later, Polar Bear becomes disappointed when Penguin expresses interest in moving house, but feels relieved once Penguin is revealed to only renew his apartment lease. Afterwards, everyone gathers during the flower-viewing festival to reminisce the time they have spent together.

== Reception ==
In 2019, Polygon named the anime series as one of the best anime of the 2010s.
