= AdPack USA =

American tissue-pack marketing company

- Website type: Tissue-pack marketing
- Founded: 2004
- Headquarters: New York City, {{{location_country}}}
- Industry: Advertising
- Products: Tissue packs
- Parent: Itochu
- Website: http://www.adpackusa.com

AdPack USA is a New York–based tissue-pack marketing company. It is the North American subsidiary of Itochu Corporation, a Japanese trading company.

== Background ==
AdPack USA is founded in 2004 and is a division of Itochu International, a Fortune 500 company. It specializes in intercept marketing, using packed tissues with branded messages given away for free. Its first tissue advertising was introduced in New York in 2005. The company has since served American clients including Blue Cross Blue Shield, Commerce Bank, Five Below retail stores, and Lowe's.

== Environmentally friendly ==
AdPack USA developed eco-friendly products and services; the packaging and the tissues in the green tissue packs are made from renewable resources and are biodegradable, and their resources are harvested and replanted in new growth forests.

== Campaigns ==
In 2007, AdPack USA produced 50,000 tissue packs for Bloom Supermarkets.

=== On Broadway ===
Legally Blonde The Musical was the first musical AdPack USA partnered with. Over 20,000 tissue-packs were distributed near Times Square. Partnership with Legally Blonde The Musical commenced through Brand Marketers. Distribution of the Legally Blonde-branded tissue-packs began in October 2007, 6 months after the show opened, and shortly after the Broadway strike. After a $10,000 media buy (about 10,000 tissue-packs), approximately $150,000 ticket sales were produced.

In the spring of 2008, AdPack USA partnered with the musical, A Catered Affair. A Catered Affair was managed by Serino Coine, a previous relationship of AdPack USA. Through the success of the Legally Blonde distribution, Serino Coine decided to try tissue-pack advertising. 10,000 pieces were distributed by Street Sampling (a street team distribution company) around the TKTS ticket booth stations; distribution occurred shortly before the close of production in July 2008.

Young Frankenstein opened on Broadway on November 7, 2007. Before production closed on January 4, 2009, AdPack USA partnered with the musical and distributed about 10,000 tissue-packs through direct mail marketing.

The most recent musical that AdPack USA partnered with is the 9-5 musical. The team at 9 to 5 approached AdPack USA, again, through Brand Marketers, and a 20,000 piece distribution of eco-friendly tissue-packs was established. The Broadway production of 9 to 5 closed on September 6, 2009.
