= Pat Henning =

American actor

Fred Patrick Henning (July 5, 1908 – April 28, 1973) was an American character actor, best known for playing Kayo Dugan in On The Waterfront (1954).

Henning was born in Boston as one of the fourth generation of a theatrical family. He first appeared on stage in a baby carriage at the age of two months as part of a vaudeville show. He traveled with his parents across much of the world, and in that process he became proficient in five languages. Although those travels prevented him from attending schools as a child, he was educated via correspondence courses from the Professional Children's School. He was a student at the New York Actors Studio, and he took a one-year course in television and film production at Lindsey Hopkins.

Henning headed bills in vaudeville shows and starred in George White's Scandals. His work in vaudeville led to his receiving a contract to act in films. After producer Andrew Stone saw Henning's vaudeville performance, he signed him to a contract the next day, and that resulted in Henning's being featured in Sensations of 1944.

In 1953 Henning received an Emmy Award for his performance in The Catered Affair. He also was in the TV shows Flipper, Gentle Ben, The Honeymooners, and Wagon Train. Films in which he appeared included Man on a Tightrope and Wind across the Everglades.

Henning was married to the former Elizabeth Croke for 32 years. He died at his Miami Beach, Florida, home on April 28, 1973, aged 62.

== Filmography ==
Year	Title	Role	Notes
1938	Shine On, Harvest Moon	Shag Jackson	
1939	Ride 'em, Cowgirl	Henchman Lingstrom	
1953	Man on a Tightrope	Konradin	
1954	On the Waterfront	Kayo Dugan	
1958	Wind Across the Everglades	Sawdust	
1963	The Cardinal	Hercule Menton	
1969	Hello Down There	Reilly	
