= Malcolm Johnson (journalist) =

American investigative journalist

Malcolm Johnson (September 24, 1904 – June 18, 1976) was an American investigative journalist of the 1940s and 1950s. His 24-part series in the New York Sun, Crime on the Waterfront, won the Pulitzer Prize for Local Reporting in 1949.

== Career and education ==
The Sun articles formed the basis for the 1954 Elia Kazan movie On the Waterfront, which starred Marlon Brando. Unlike the articles, which described corruption and organized crime infiltration on the New York City waterfront, the movie was set across the river in Hoboken, New Jersey.

Johnson graduated from Mercer University in 1926.

He was the father of Washington Post reporter Haynes Johnson, who also won a Pulitzer Prize, making the two the first ever father and son duo to take the award.

Johnson's New York Sun articles were compiled as a book in 2005.
