= Man on a Tightrope =

1953 film

- Theatrical poster
- Directed by: Elia Kazan
- Screenplay by: Robert E. Sherwood
- Based on: Man on a Tightrope: The Short Novel (1953) by Neil Paterson
- Starring: Fredric March; Terry Moore; Gloria Grahame; Paul Hartman; Richard Boone; Cameron Mitchell; Adolphe Menjou
- Cinematography: Georg Krause
- Edited by: Dorothy Spencer
- Music by: Franz Waxman
- Distributed by: Twentieth Century-Fox
- Release date: June 4, 1953
- Running time: 105 minutes
- Country: United States
- Language: English
- Budget: $1.2 million

Man on a Tightrope is a 1953 American drama directed by Elia Kazan, starring Fredric March, Terry Moore and Gloria Grahame. The screenplay by Robert E. Sherwood was based on a 1952 novel of the same title by Neil Paterson. Paterson based his true story, which first appeared as the magazine novelette International Incident, on the escape of the Circus Brumbach from East Germany in 1950. Members of the Circus Brumbach appeared in the film version in both character roles and as extras. The film was entered into the 3rd Berlin International Film Festival.

== Plot ==
In 1952 Czechoslovakia, circus man Karel Černík struggles to keep his beloved Cirkus Černík together, which belonged to his family before being nationalized by the Communist government. The government allows Černík to manage the circus, but he grapples with its deteriorating conditions, loss of his workers to the state, tension with his willful daughter Tereza, and his young second wife Zama, whom everyone suspects of being unfaithful. Černík wants to end a budding romance between Tereza and roustabout Joe Vosdek, who has been with the circus for only a year.

Černík is interrogated at the headquarters of the S.N.B. state security in Plzeň on why he is not performing the Marxist propaganda acts dictated by the government. Černík explains that the skits were not funny, and that audiences prefer his usual act. The S.N.B. chief orders him to resume the required act, and to dismiss a longtime trouper who calls herself "The Duchess". Propaganda minister Fesker casually asks him about a radio in his trailer, alerting Černík to a spy in his midst. Černík is fined and released although Fesker believes that he is a threat to the state.

Černík, inspired by a recent spate of escapes from behind the Iron Curtain, has decided to escape over the border to Bavaria in West Germany. Černík suspects that Joe is the spy but unknown to him, Tereza has learned that Joe is actually a deserter from the American Army who is planning an escape attempt of his own. Černík's longtime rival Barovik visits and reveals that he knows of the escape plan. Barovik assures Černík that, because they are both circus men, he will not betray him. Černík agrees to leave behind most of his equipment for Barovik. Realizing that he must act swiftly, Černík discovers that Krofta, who has worked for Černík for twenty years, is actually the spy. Černík ties up Krofta but is confronted by Fesker about a travel permit, which he issues to catch Černík in the act of trying to escape. Fesker is about to pursue the circus when he is arrested by a commissar sergeant for issuing the travel permit.

Joe reveals himself to Černík, who incorporates him into the plan. At the border crossing, Krofta escapes but is stopped by Černík from warning the border guards. In the fracas, Krofta mortally wounds him. Using an audacious and violent dash across the only bridge, most of the circus safely escape only to be told that Černík has paid with his life. Obeying his dying wish, Zama orders the troupe to march on.

== Cast ==
- Fredric March as Karel Černík
- Terry Moore as Tereza Černík
- Gloria Grahame as Zama Černík
- Cameron Mitchell as Joe Vosdek
- Adolphe Menjou as Fesker
- Robert Beatty as Barović
- Alexander D'Arcy as Rudolph
- Richard Boone as Krofta
- Pat Henning as Konradin
- Paul Hartman as Jaromír
- John Dehner as the SNB chief
- Willy Castello as Captain

== Production ==
The film was shot on location in Bavaria, then in West Germany. Authentic acts were used and the entire Circus Brumbach was employed for the production. The original plot to escape in small increments across the border was the actual means used by the Circus Brumbach in their escape.

== Reception ==
A. H. Weiler of The New York Times gave the film a positive review, praising the use of the real life Brumbach Circus, writing that it "captured not only geographical authenticity but the irrepressible showmanship of typical, itinerant performers..." and describing the film as "not only an arresting melodrama but a vivid commentary on a restricted way of life in our parlous times."
