= On the Waterfront =

1954 film by Elia Kazan

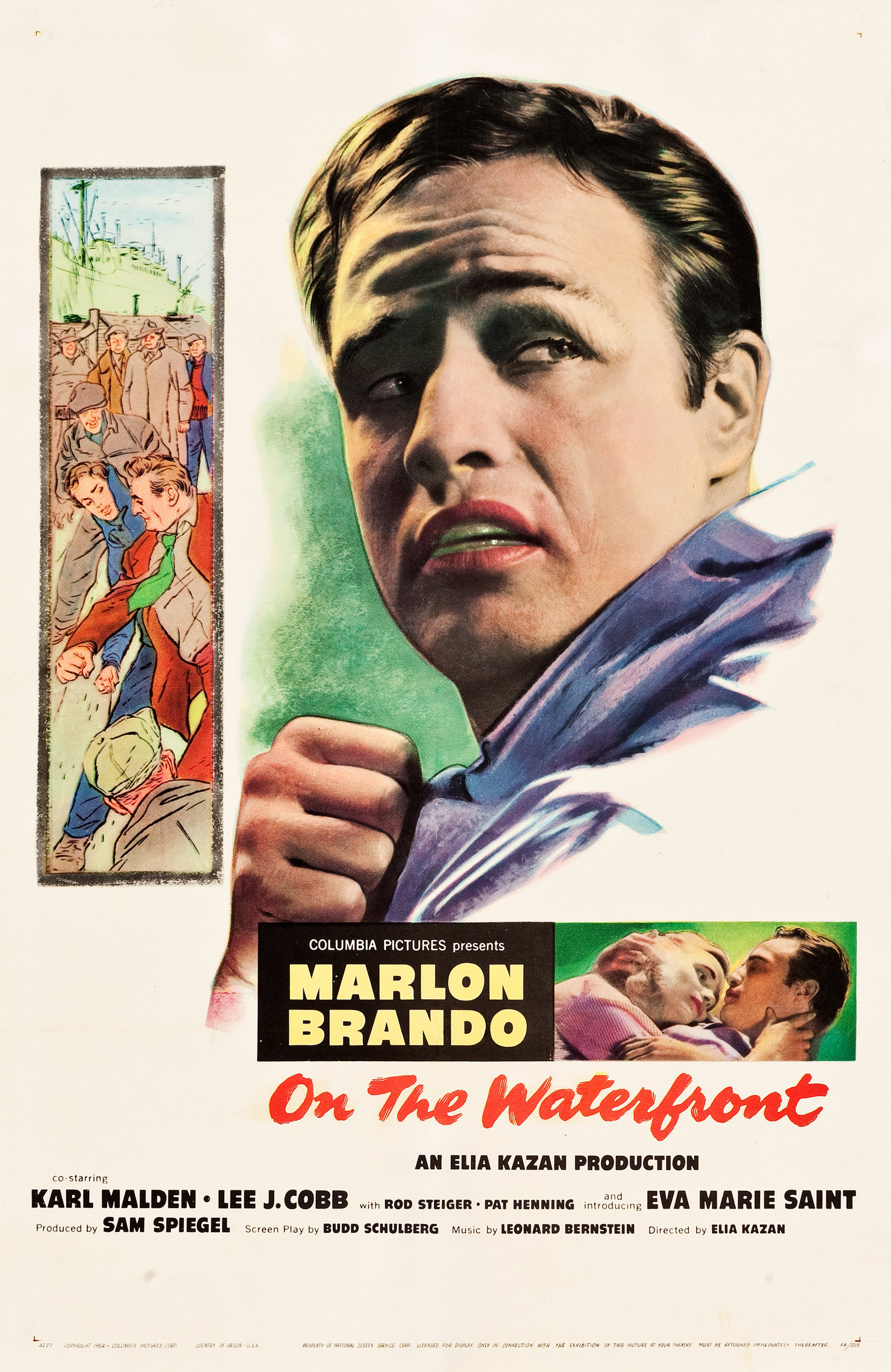
- Theatrical release poster
- Directed by: Elia Kazan
- Written by: Budd Schulberg
- Suggested by: "Crime on the Waterfront" by Malcolm Johnson
- Produced by: Sam Spiegel
- Starring: Marlon Brando; Karl Malden; Lee J. Cobb; Rod Steiger; Pat Henning; Eva Marie Saint
- Cinematography: Boris Kaufman
- Edited by: Gene Milford
- Music by: Leonard Bernstein
- Production company: Horizon Pictures
- Distributed by: Columbia Pictures
- Release date: July 28, 1954
- Running time: 108 minutes
- Country: United States
- Language: English
- Budget: $910,000
- Box office: $9.6 million

On the Waterfront is a 1954 American crime drama film, directed by Elia Kazan and written by Budd Schulberg. It stars Marlon Brando, and features Karl Malden, Lee J. Cobb, Rod Steiger, Pat Henning and Eva Marie Saint in her film debut. The musical score was composed by Leonard Bernstein, his only original film score. The black-and-white film was inspired by "Crime on the Waterfront" by Malcolm Johnson, a series of articles published in November–December 1948 in the New York Sun which won the 1949 Pulitzer Prize for Local Reporting, but the screenplay by Budd Schulberg is directly based on his own original story. The film focuses on union violence and corruption among longshoremen, while detailing widespread corruption, extortion, and racketeering on the waterfronts of Hoboken, New Jersey.

On the Waterfront was a critical and commercial success and is considered one of the greatest films ever made and is said to revolve around the subject matter of alienation at the lowest social level. It received twelve Academy Award nominations and won eight, including Best Picture, Best Actor for Brando, Best Supporting Actress for Saint, and Best Director for Kazan. In 1998, it was ranked by the American Film Institute as the eighth-greatest American movie of all time; in AFI's 2007 list, it was ranked 19th. It is Bernstein's only original film score not adapted from a stage production with songs.

In 1989, On the Waterfront was one of the first 25 films to be deemed "culturally, historically, or aesthetically significant" by the Library of Congress and selected for preservation in the United States National Film Registry.

== Plot ==
New York prizefighter Terry Malloy's career was cut short when he purposely lost a fight at the request of mob boss Johnny Friendly. Terry now works for Friendly's labor union as a longshoreman while his older, more educated brother Charley is Friendly's right-hand man. Terry is coerced into luring fellow worker Joey Doyle onto a rooftop, where he believes Friendly's henchmen want to talk Joey out of testifying to the Waterfront Crime Commission. When they instead murder Joey by throwing him off the roof, Terry confronts Friendly, but is threatened and bribed into acquiescence.

Joey's sister Edie and priest Father Barry try to inspire the dockworkers to stand up to Friendly. Terry attends the meeting as a snitch, but when it is violently broken up by Friendly's men, he helps Edie escape and misses Father Barry convincing one worker to testify. After the testimony, the worker is killed in a staged workplace accident.

Terry's unwillingness to testify is softened by his growing feelings for Edie, and her and Father Barry’s pursuit of justice. He confesses his role in Joey's death to both. Shocked by this, Edie distances herself from him.

Friendly sends Charley with a job offer to keep Terry quiet. Knowing refusal will get Terry killed, Charley urges him to comply. When Terry expresses regret about throwing his best fight and blames Charley for setting up the fix, Charley hands him a gun and tells him to run. Terry finds Edie and they kiss. After hearing someone in the street, they find Charley murdered.

Determined to kill Friendly, Terry is convinced by Father Barry to instead testify in court. Following the hearing, Friendly loses his powerful connections and faces indictment.

When he is excluded from the next hiring call at the harbor, Terry confronts Friendly together with the other workers, saying that he is proud of testifying and no longer betraying himself. After seeing Terry get beaten severely by Friendly’s thugs, the longshoremen refuse to work without him and renounce Friendly, wishing to run the union "on the up-and-up". Encouraged by Edie and Father Barry, Terry stumbles to the warehouse. The men follow him inside and the door closes, leaving Friendly outside, ignored by the workers and shippers.

== Cast ==
- Marlon Brando as Terry Malloy
- Karl Malden as Father Pete Barry
- Lee J. Cobb as Michael J. Skelly a.k.a. "Johnny Friendly"
- Rod Steiger as Charley "the Gent" Malloy
- Pat Henning as Timothy J. "Kayo" Dugan
- Leif Erickson as Lead Investigator for Crime Commission
- James Westerfield as Big Mac
- Tony Galento as Truck
- Tami Mauriello as Tillio
- John F. Hamilton as "Pop" Doyle
- John Heldabrand as Mott
- Rudy Bond as Moose
- Don Blackman as Luke
- Arthur Keegan as Jimmy
- Abe Simon as Barney
- Eva Marie Saint as Edie Doyle
- Fred Gwynne as Mladen "Slim" Sekulovich (uncredited)
- Martin Balsam as Gillette, Secondary Investigator for Crime Commission (uncredited)
- Katherine MacGregor as a longshoreman's mother (uncredited)
- Pat Hingle as Jocko (uncredited)
- Nehemiah Persoff as Cab Driver (uncredited)
- Thomas Hanley as Tommy (credited as Thomas Handley)

== Production ==
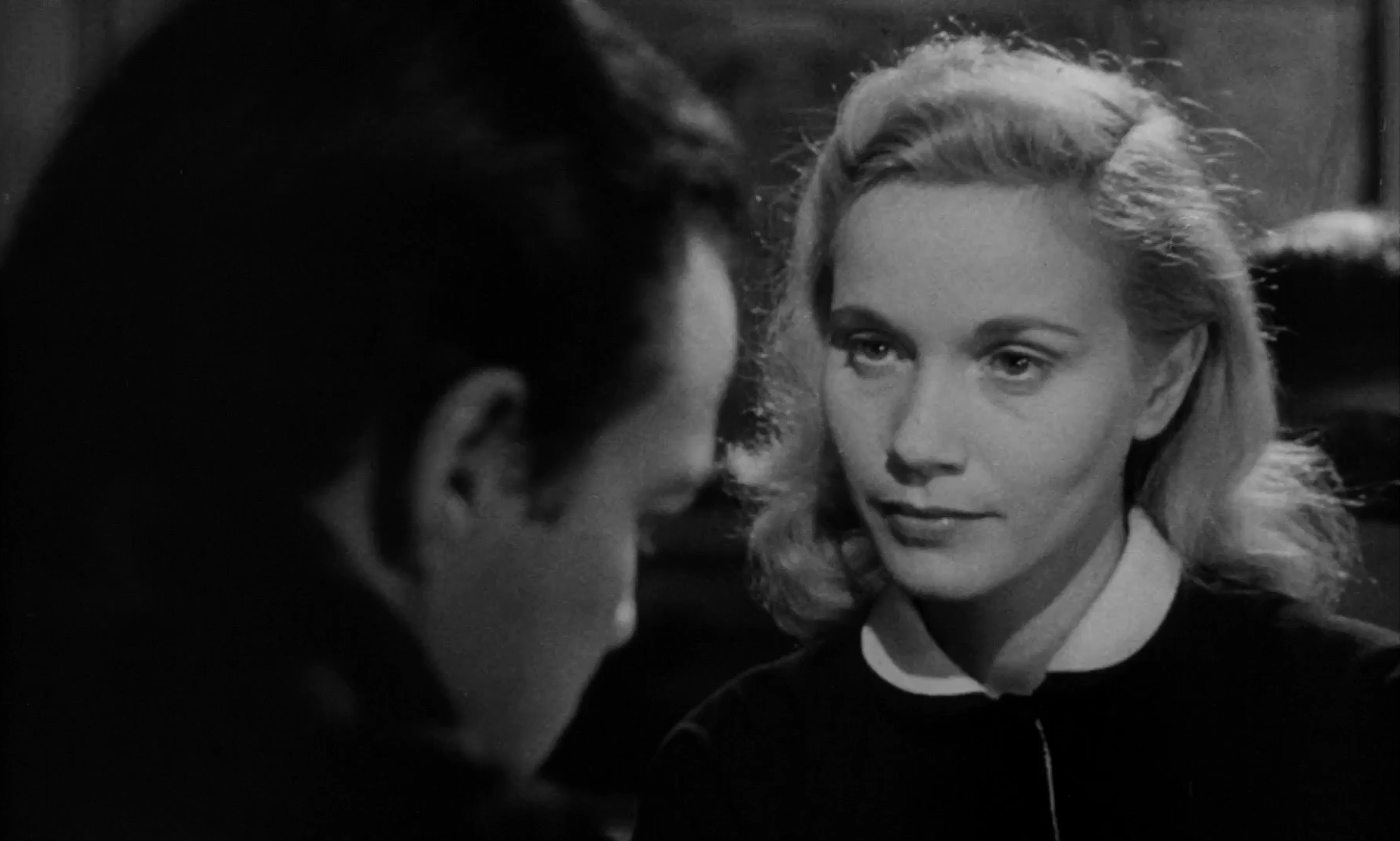
Marlon Brando as Terry Malloy and Eva Marie Saint as Edie Doyle in the film's trailer

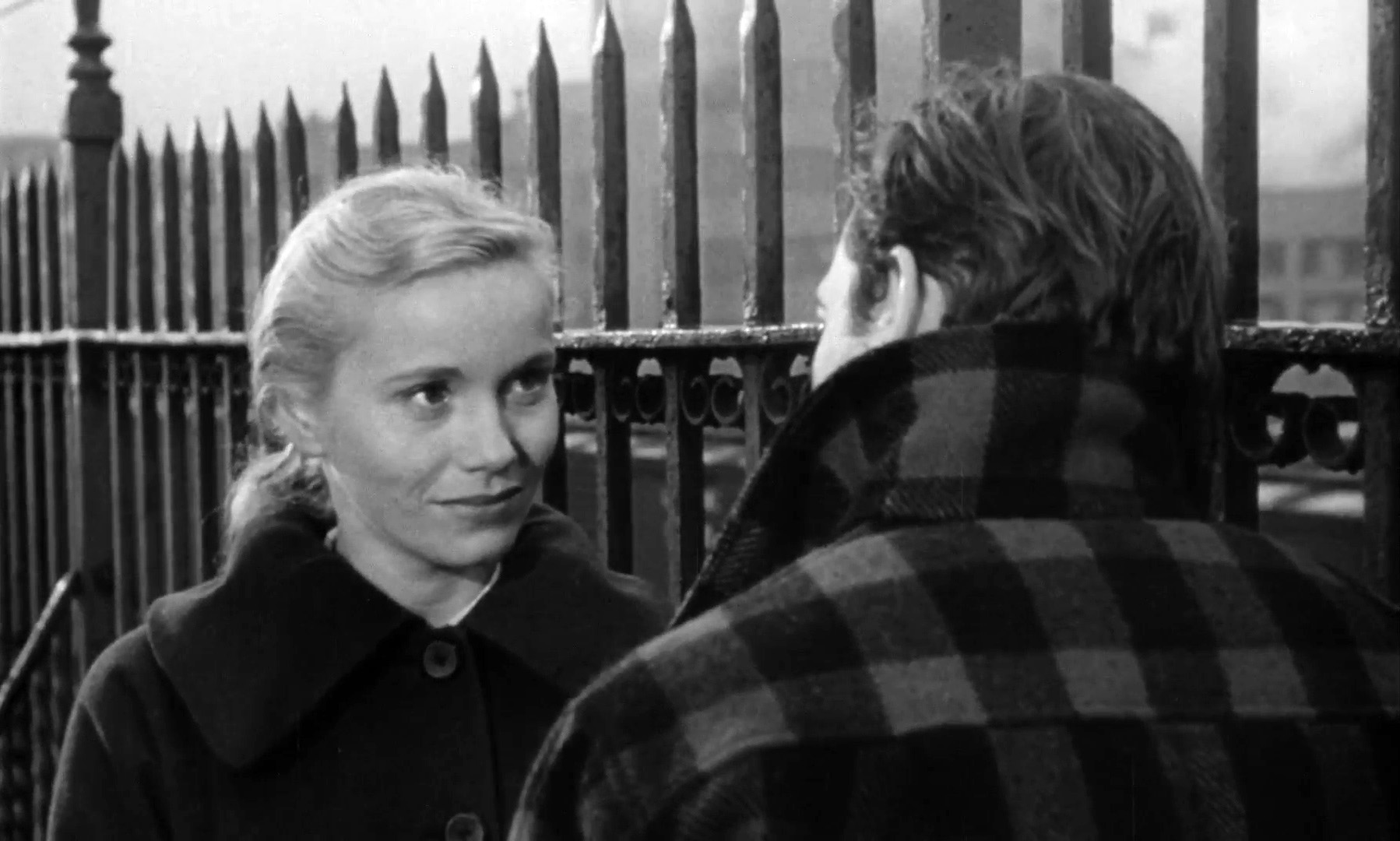
Eva Marie Saint as Edie Doyle and Marlon Brando as Terry Malloy

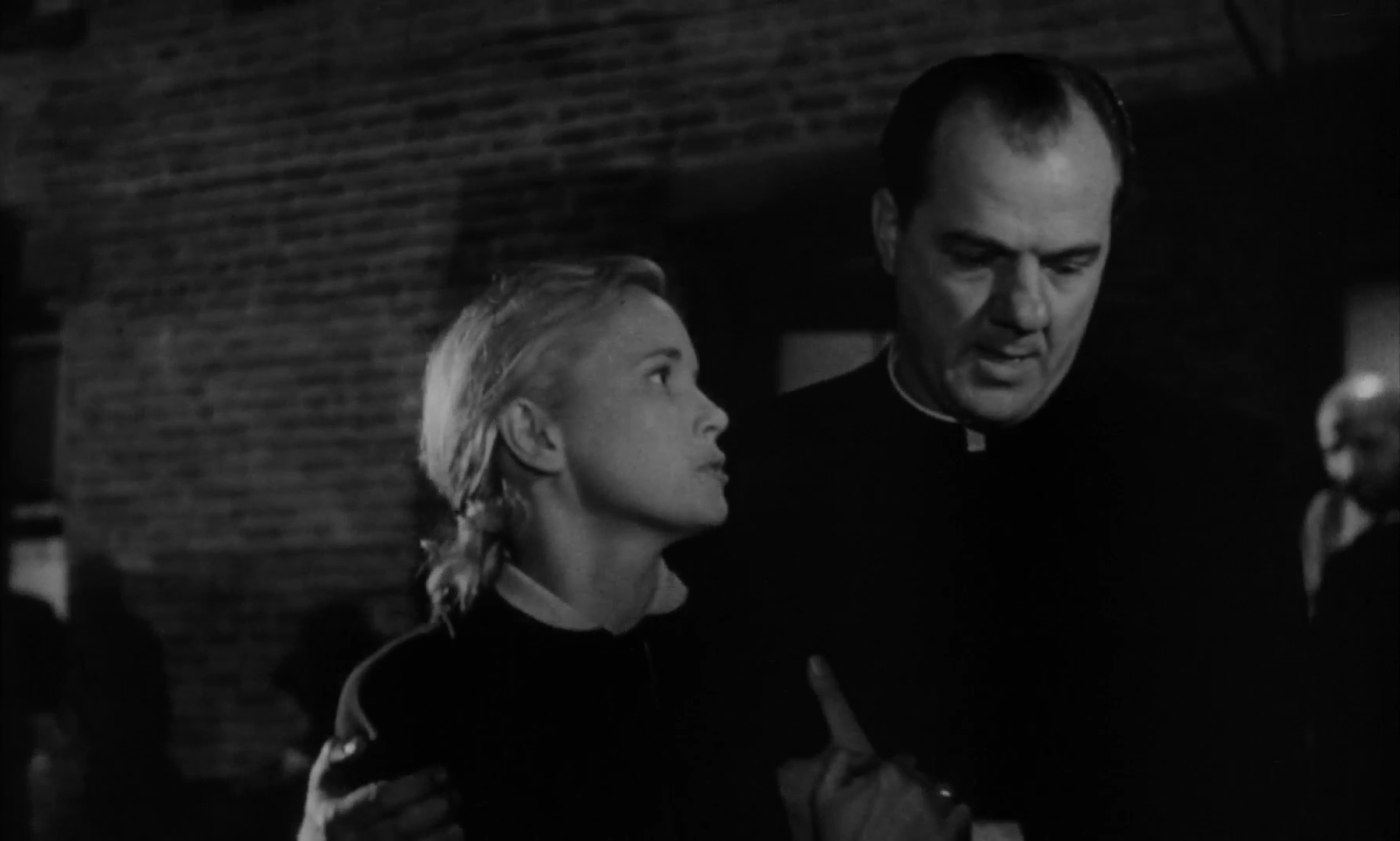
Karl Malden as Father Barry, with Eva Marie Saint

=== Screenplay and political context ===
The film is widely considered to be Elia Kazan's answer to those who criticized him for identifying eight Communists in the film industry before the House Committee on Un-American Activities (HUAC) in 1952. One of Kazan's critics was his friend and collaborator, the noted playwright Arthur Miller, who had earlier written the first version of the script, originally titled The Hook. Kazan had agreed to direct it, and in 1951 they met with Harry Cohn at Columbia Pictures about making the picture. Cohn agreed in principle to make The Hook, but there were concerns about the portrayal of corrupt union officials. When Cohn asked that the antagonists be changed to Communists, Miller refused. Cohn sent a letter telling Miller it was interesting he had resisted Columbia's desire to make the movie "pro-American". Kazan asked Miller to rewrite the script; Miller declined due to his disenchantment with Kazan's friendly testimony before the HUAC. Kazan then replaced Miller with Budd Schulberg. The screenwriter later recalled how he had researched the story on the docks: "I spent two years down there. I sat in on meetings the rebels held and roamed about the waterfront bars. I saw what a shapeup was like. I would report back to Kazan on what I had seen. Kazan made many suggestions in the course of my writing."

Cobb's character of Johnny Friendly was partly modeled on Johnny Dio, a real-life mobster known for involvement in labor racketeering.

=== Casting ===
According to Richard Schickel in his biography of Kazan, Marlon Brando initially declined the role of Terry Malloy, and Frank Sinatra (a native of Hoboken, where the film was being made) then had "a handshake deal" – but no formally signed contract – to play the part, even attending an initial costume fitting. But Kazan still favored Brando for the role, partly because casting Brando would assure a larger budget for the picture. While Brando's agent, Jay Kanter, attempted to persuade Brando to change his mind, Kazan enlisted actor Karl Malden, whom Kazan considered more suited to a career as a director than as an actor, to direct and film a screen test of a "more Brando-like" actor as Terry Malloy, to persuade producer Sam Spiegel that "an actor like Marlon Brando" could perform the role more forcefully than Sinatra. To that end, Malden filmed a screen test of Actors Studio members Paul Newman and Joanne Woodward performing the love scene between Terry and Edie. Persuaded by the Newman/Woodward screen test, Spiegel agreed to reconsider Brando for the role, and shortly afterward, Kanter convinced Brando to reconsider his refusal. Within a week, Brando signed a contract to perform in the film. At that point, a furious Sinatra demanded to be cast in the role of Father Barry, the waterfront priest. It was left to Spiegel to break the news to Sinatra that Malden had been signed for this role.

=== Filming locations ===
On the Waterfront was filmed over 36 days on location in various places in Hoboken, New Jersey, including the docks, workers' slum dwellings, bars, littered alleys, and rooftops. The church used for exterior scenes in the film was the historic Our Lady of Grace, built in 1874, while the interiors were shot at the Church of St. Peter and St. Paul at 400 Hudson Street.

== Reception ==
Upon its release, the film received positive reviews from critics, and was a commercial success, earning an estimated $4.2 million at the North American box office in 1954. In his July 29, 1954, review, New York Times critic A. H. Weiler called the film "an uncommonly powerful, exciting, and imaginative use of the screen by gifted professionals".

Film critic of the time Pauline Kael said of the film that it succeeded in creating a complicated and meaningful figure out of the "American lower depths."

Film showings at the time produced violent audience reactions where many theaters had to call in the police to keep order.

On Rotten Tomatoes, the film holds a score of 99% from 111 reviews, with an average rating of 9.2/10. The website's critics consensus reads, "With his electrifying performance in Elia Kazan's thought-provoking, expertly constructed melodrama, Marlon Brando redefined the possibilities of acting for film and helped permanently alter the cinematic landscape". On Metacritic, the film holds a weighted average score of 91 out of 100 based on 15 critics, indicating "universal acclaim".

Gaining the Academy Award for Best Actor and being named the greatest and second-greatest film performance of all time by Aaron West of Criterion and by Premiere respectively, Brando's performance is regarded as one of the watershed moments in the history of movies. Through his portrayal of Terry Malloy, Brando popularized method acting and conclusively exemplified the power of Stanislavski-based approach in cinema. Praising Brando in 2004, director Martin Scorsese noted: "Everything that we know about the power of great screen acting relates back to him: when you watch his work in On the Waterfront ... you're watching the purest poetry imaginable, in dynamic motion". Brando, at the time in which he accepted the Academy Award, gave a humble acceptance speech, stating that he was "sure [the winner] was going to be Bing [Crosby]" for his performance in The Country Girl. Kazan, the director of the film, would later write in his book, "If there is a better performance by a man in the history of film in America, I don't know what it is."

Al Pacino, recounting his own memories on first seeing On the Waterfront, told Playboy in a 1979 interview that he concentrated more on the lead actor than the film itself, "I couldn't move. I couldn't leave the theatre. I'd never seen the like of it." Anthony Hopkins said, "When you see Brando in the famous cab scene in On the Waterfront, it's still breathtaking." In a eulogy for Brando, Jack Nicholson described his display "probably the height of any age", and added that, "You just couldn't take your eyes off the guy. He was spellbinding."

In a 1982 interview, Orson Welles criticized the film and its director, saying, "Elia Kazan is a traitor. He is a man who sold to McCarthy all of his companions...and having sold all of his people to McCarthy he then made a film On the Waterfront, which was a celebration of the informant."

=== Awards and nominations ===
Award	Category	Nominee(s)	Result	Ref.
Academy Awards	Best Motion Picture	Sam Spiegel	Won	
Academy Awards	Best Director	Elia Kazan	Won	
Academy Awards	Best Actor	Marlon Brando	Won	
Academy Awards	Best Supporting Actor	Lee J. Cobb	Nominated	
Academy Awards	Best Supporting Actor	Karl Malden	Nominated	
Academy Awards	Best Supporting Actor	Rod Steiger	Nominated	
Academy Awards	Best Supporting Actress	Eva Marie Saint	Won	
Academy Awards	Best Story and Screenplay	Budd Schulberg	Won	
Academy Awards	Best Art Direction – Black-and-White	Richard Day	Won	
Academy Awards	Best Cinematography – Black-and-White	Boris Kaufman	Won	
Academy Awards	Best Film Editing	Gene Milford	Won	
Academy Awards	Best Music Score of a Dramatic or Comedy Picture	Leonard Bernstein	Nominated	
Bambi Awards	Best Film – International		Won	
Bambi Awards	Best Actor – International	Marlon Brando	Nominated	
Bodil Awards	Best American Film		Won	
British Academy Film Awards	Best Film from any Source		Nominated	
British Academy Film Awards	Best Foreign Actor	Marlon Brando	Won	
British Academy Film Awards	Most Promising Newcomer to Film	Eva Marie Saint	Nominated	
Directors Guild of America Awards	Outstanding Directorial Achievement in Motion Pictures	Elia Kazan	Won	
Golden Globe Awards	Best Motion Picture – Drama		Won	
Golden Globe Awards	Best Actor in a Motion Picture – Drama	Marlon Brando	Won	
Golden Globe Awards	Best Director – Motion Picture	Elia Kazan	Won	
Golden Globe Awards	Best Cinematography – Black and White	Boris Kaufman	Won	
International Film Music Critics Association Awards	Best Archival Release of an Existing Score – Re-Release or Re-Recording	Leonard Bernstein, Douglass Fake, Frank K. DeWald, and Joe Sikoryak	Won	
Nastro d'Argento	Best Foreign Film	Elia Kazan	Won	
National Board of Review Awards	Top Ten Films		Won	
National Board of Review Awards	Best Film		Won	
National Film Preservation Board	National Film Registry		Inducted	
New York Film Critics Circle Awards	Best Film		Won	
New York Film Critics Circle Awards	Best Director	Elia Kazan	Won	
New York Film Critics Circle Awards	Best Actor	Marlon Brando	Won	
New York Film Critics Circle Awards	Best Actress	Eva Marie Saint	Nominated	
Online Film & Television Association Awards	Hall of Fame – Motion Picture		Inducted	
Venice International Film Festival	Golden Lion	Elia Kazan	Nominated	
Venice International Film Festival	Silver Lion	Elia Kazan	Won	
Venice International Film Festival	OCIC Award	Elia Kazan	Won	
Venice International Film Festival	Pasinetti Award	Elia Kazan	Won	
Writers Guild of America Awards	Best Written American Drama	Budd Schulberg	Won	

In 1989, the film was deemed "culturally, historically, or aesthetically significant" by the Library of Congress, and selected for preservation in the United States National Film Registry. In 2006, Writers Guild of America ranked its screenplay 18th in WGA’s list of 101 Greatest Screenplays.

In 1995, it made it on the Vatican's list of 45 important films.

American Film Institute recognition

- AFI's 100 Years... 100 Movies – #8
- AFI's 100 Years... 100 Heroes and Villains:
  - Terry Malloy – #23 Hero
- AFI's 100 Years... 100 Movie Quotes:
  - "You don't understand! I coulda had class. I coulda been a contender. I coulda been somebody instead of a bum, which is what I am." – #3
- AFI's 100 Years of Film Scores – #22
- AFI's 100 Years... 100 Cheers – #36
- AFI's 100 Years... 100 Movies (10th Anniversary Edition) – #19

== Home media ==
The first home video release of the film was by Columbia Pictures Home Entertainment in 1982, on VHS and Beta. RCA/Columbia Pictures Home Video later re-released it in 1984, 1986, and 1990, respectively, the latter being a part of the Columbia Classics line-up. Columbia TriStar later reissued the film on VHS in 1995 as part of the line-up's "Studio Heritage Collection", and the first DVD version was released in 2001. Among the special features is the featurette "Contender: Mastering the Method", a video photo gallery, an interview with Elia Kazan, an audio commentary, filmographies, production notes, and theatrical trailers. The film has been added to the Criterion Collection.

The 2013 Criterion Collection release presents the film in three aspect ratios: 1.66:1, 1.85:1, and 1.33:1. The accompanying booklet explains the reasoning behind this choice: "In 1953, Columbia Pictures was transitioning to the new widescreen format and declared that all its upcoming films, including On The Waterfront, would be suitable for projection in any aspect ratio from the full frame of 1.33:1 to the then widest standard of 1.85:1. The customary frame of European cinematographer Boris Kaufman (Twelve Angry Men, Baby Doll) split the difference at 1.66:1, so that all that was required was for him to leave extra room at the top and bottom of the frame and make sure that nothing essential would be lost in the widescreen presentation. At its premiere in 1954, On The Waterfront was projected at 1.85:1. Over subsequent decades, millions of television viewers became accustomed to seeing the film with the open-matte 1.33:1 framing, a presentation that has carried over into the home video era. Here, for the first time, Criterion is presenting the film in all three aspect ratios so that viewers can compare and choose the version they prefer."

Sony Pictures Home Entertainment continued the three aspect ratios from the Criterion Collection release when it issued the film on Ultra HD Blu-ray in 2024 as part of the fifth volume of the Columbia Classics 4K Ultra HD Collection.

== Adaptations ==
In the same year that the film was released, Budd Schulberg published a novel simply entitled Waterfront based on his script. In the novel Terry Malloy dies. It is more heavily focused on the priest who stands up to the mob, and narrated in first person by him.

In 1984, the film script was adapted to stage by Schulberg, opening on Broadway in November. It had several technical innovations for the time, including lasers, filmlike scenic dissolves and sounds that enveloped the audience. As with Schulberg's earlier novel, the motivations of Father Barry are made more explicit, and the ending is less happy. It was revised in 1995 and lasted for only 8 performances, losing $2.6 million, a record on Broadway for a non-musical at the time.

The Indian films Baarish (1957), Kabzaa (1988), Parinda (1989), Ghulam (1998) and Sudhandhiram (2000) are inspired by On the Waterfront.

A 2009 British stage production was directed by Steven Berkoff, who also played Johnny Friendly, with Simon Merrells as Terry. It played at the Theatre Royal, Haymarket in London, after the Nottingham Playhouse and the Edinburgh Festival Fringe.

== See also ==
- List of oldest and youngest Academy Award winners and nominees — Youngest winners for Best Lead Actor
