= 1954 New York Film Critics Circle Awards =

20th New York Film Critics Circle Awards

20th New York Film Critics Circle Awards

unknown
(announced December 28, 1954)

On the Waterfront

The 20th New York Film Critics Circle Awards, honored the best filmmaking of 1954.

== Winners ==
- Best Film:
  - On the Waterfront
- Best Actor:
  - Marlon Brando – On the Waterfront
- Best Actress:
  - Grace Kelly – The Country Girl, Rear Window and Dial M for Murder
- Best Director:
  - Elia Kazan – On the Waterfront
- Best Foreign Language Film:
  - Gate of Hell (Jigokumon) – Japan
