= Zachary Borovay =

American media designer

- Occupations: Media Designer, Creative Director
- Website: https://borovaydesign.com/

Zachary Borovay is an American media designer, educator, creative director and team leader specializing in Broadway, Off Broadway, Concerts, Opera, Theme Parks, Corporate Events and Museum Installations. His work has been seen all over the world.

== Career ==
His credits include projection design for the Broadway production of Rock of Ages (also Las Vegas, London, Australia, Toronto, Norwegian Cruise Lines and more), "Holler If Ya Hear Me," "No Man's Land" and "Waiting For Godot" with Ian McKellen and Patrick Stewart, "Evita," Elf and Lombardi (2011 Drama Desk nomination) on Broadway, PEEPSHOW at the Planet Hollywood Resort and Casino in Las Vegas, and The Creature from the Black Lagoon at Universal Studios Hollywood, To Be Or Not To Be (Broadway), A Catered Affair (Broadway, for which he earned a 2008 Drama Desk nomination for best video or projection design) and Xanadu (Broadway, International Tour). Regional credits include projections for the national tour of Les Misérables, Jason Robert Brown's 13 at the Mark Taper Forum and NERDS for the Philadelphia Theatre Company. He is the recipient of numerous awards including the Helen Hayes, the IRNE, the Carbonell and more.

Internationally he designed video projections for Voyage de la Vie at RWS Resorts in Sentosa, Singapore, the Dutch version of the hit musical The Wiz as well as a number of concerts at the Barbican Centre in London. He designed projections for the Radio City Music Hall 75th Anniversary Christmas Spectacular. He is also known for his work as a journalist and educator, and is a contributing editor to LiveDesign magazine, for whom he has acted as Creative Consultant for LDI and the Broadway Master Classes. He has also designed and consulted for both Disney and Universal theme parks and for many cruise ships around the world.

In addition to his work as a visual artist, Borovay is also a formally trained musician, having studied jazz bass at both Berklee College of Music and New England Conservatory of Music. He has performed with the band Arsenal for the musical Rock of Ages.

Borovay worked with United Scenic Artists, a union which represents theatrical crafts such as scenic, lighting and costume design, to create a new category for projection designers.

In 2026 Borovay joined Image Engineering.
