= Shine On, Harvest Moon (1938 film) =

1938 film directed by Joseph Kane

- Theatrical release poster
- Directed by: Joseph Kane
- Screenplay by: Jack Natteford
- Produced by: Charles E. Ford
- Starring: Roy Rogers; Mary Hart
- Cinematography: William Nobles
- Edited by: Lester Orlebeck
- Music by: Cy Feuer
- Production company: Republic Pictures
- Distributed by: Republic Pictures
- Release date: December 30, 1938 (USA)
- Running time: 57 minutes
- Country: United States
- Language: English

Shine On, Harvest Moon is a 1938 American Western film directed by Joseph Kane and starring Roy Rogers and Mary Hart. Written by Jack Natteford, the film is about a crazed outlaw who looks up a former partner, who has "gone straight", and tries to blackmail him with his past into resuming a life of crime. When this plan fails, the outlaw and his two psychopathic sons re-establish their gang and begin a wave of violence and rustling in the surrounding area, and arrange evidence that his former partner is the actual criminal. The partner's daughter engages the sympathy of Roy Rogers in bringing the truth to light and the real villains to justice. The supporting cast includes Stanley Andrews and William Farnum, and features Lulu Belle and Scotty in their only film appearance.

== Cast ==
- Roy Rogers as Roy Rogers
- Mary Hart as Claire Brower (as Mary Hart)
- Myrtle Wiseman as Lulu Belle (as Lulu Belle and Scotty)
- Scotty Wiseman as Scotty (as Lulu Belle and Scotty)
- Stanley Andrews as Pa Jackson
- William Farnum as Milt Brower
- Frank Jaquet as Homer Sheldon
- Chester Gunnels as Chester
- Matty Roubert as Ben Jackson
- Pat Henning as Shag Jackson
- Jack Rockwell as Foreman Jim Mason
- Joe Whitehead as Sheriff Clay
