= The Catered Affair (Goodyear Television Playhouse) =

- Goodyear Television Playhouse episode
- Episode no.: Season 4 Episode 17
- Directed by: Robert Mulligan
- Written by: Paddy Chayefsky
- Production code: Showcase Productions
- Original air date: 22 May 1955

Guest appearances
- Thelma Ritter; Pat Henning

"The Catered Affair" is a television play episode from the television series Goodyear Television Playhouse. "The Catered Affair" was written by Paddy Chayefsky and was first shown on May 22, 1955. The cast included Pat Henning, Thelma Ritter, and J. Pat O'Malley.

The play was adapted into a 1956 feature film and 2008 stage musical.

It was the last original TV play Chayefsky wrote. A subsequent TV play, The Great American Hoax, was based on an early Chayefsky story.

== Reception ==
Chayefsky later called the play "an unfocused piece, in which the first act was farce, and the second was comedy-drama and the third was abruptly drama. There aren't a dozen actresses who could make one piece out of all that; Miss Ritter, of course, did."

The New York Times TV critic later wrote that "the playwright abandoned the stark simplicity that has become his trademark and tried to tell a family story from too many points of view. Parts of his play were rewarding but the whole was disappointing."

== Awards ==
Paddy Chayefsky and Thelma Ritter both received Emmy nominations for their work. Pat Henning won an Emmy for his performance.
