= A Catered Affair =

- Cover of Original Broadway Cast Recording
- Music: John Bucchino
- Lyrics: John Bucchino
- Book: Harvey Fierstein
- Basis: The Catered Affair by Paddy Chayefsky The Catered Affair by Gore Vidal
- Productions: 2007 San Diego Tryout; 2008 Broadway

The article is about the stage musical. For the 1956 film, see The Catered Affair.

A Catered Affair is a musical with a book by Harvey Fierstein and music and lyrics by John Bucchino. It is based on both the 1956 film The Catered Affair written by Gore Vidal and the original 1955 teleplay from Goodyear Television Playhouse by Paddy Chayefsky, set in 1953 in the Bronx. This is the first of Bucchino's scores produced on Broadway.

== Production ==
The show premiered on September 20, 2007 at San Diego's Old Globe Theatre in tryouts, with the official opening on September 30, running through November 11. The show began previews on Broadway at the Walter Kerr Theatre on March 25, 2008 and opened officially on April 17. The production closed on July 27, 2008 after 116 performances and 27 previews. John Doyle directed the production, which starred Fierstein, Faith Prince and Tom Wopat. This production received 12 Drama Desk Award nominations, the most of any show from the 2007–08 season.

== Plot synopsis ==
In the Bronx in 1953, young lovers Jane Hurley and Ralph Halloran decide to get married. Meanwhile, Jane's father, Tom, who owns a third-share in a taxi, agrees with one of his partners, Sam, that they will buy out the share of the third driver, Pasternak. Jane and Ralph, along with Tom and Sam, happily exclaim the virtues of partnership ("Partners"). Timing is inauspicious, since the bride's brother has just been killed in the Korean War. The couple does not want a large, expensive wedding, and Tom needs the money to buy out Pasternak. As Jane's mother Aggie announces that the upcoming wedding will be held quickly and quietly in City Hall, the neighborhood women react ("Women Chatter"). Dinner with Ralph's wealthier family leads Aggie to decide to give the couple a huge formal affair, committing her and Tom's life's savings and bereavement check to an elaborate wedding with an extensive guest list and a lavish catered reception ("Our Only Daughter"). Aggie feels guilty about having neglected Jane and sees an opportunity to plan the white wedding that she never had. The bride's gay Uncle Winston, initially hurt and furious at having been left off the original guest list, becomes a support for Aggie.

Jane is initially beguiled by the attention, and happily picks out a wedding dress ("One White Dress"). But soon relationships are strained to the breaking point under the pressure of costly bridesmaids' dresses, cake layers, and each detail. Aggie confesses to Jane that she and Tom were married because she was pregnant ("Vision"), and because her father bought Tom his share in the taxi. Finally Jane and Ralph decide to call off the elaborate wedding and party and marry quietly as they had planned. The quiet and unemotional Tom finally expresses his love and caring for Aggie ("I Stayed"), and Tom and Aggie come closer together. As they get ready for the small wedding ceremony, Aggie secretly makes arrangements for Tom to buy his share of the taxi, which arrives in time for him to drive her to their daughter's wedding. Uncle Winston has the last word ("Coney Island"):

"You paid your money, took the ride, but missed the view."

== Song list ==
- "Partners" — Tom Hurley, Sam, Ralph Halloran and Jane Hurley
- "Ralph and Me" — Jane Hurley
- "Married" — Aggie
- "Women Chatter" — Myra, Pasha and Dolores
- "No Fuss" — Aggie
- "Your Children's Happiness" — Mr. Halloran and Mrs. Halloran
- "Immediate Family" — Uncle Winston
- "Our Only Daughter" — Aggie
- "Women Chatter 2" — Dolores, Pasha and Uncle Winston
- "One White Dress" — Jane Hurley and Aggie
- "Vision" — Aggie
- "Don't Ever Stop Saying "I Love You"" — Jane Hurley and Ralph Halloran
- "I Stayed" — Tom Hurley
- "Married (Reprise)" — Aggie
- "Coney Island" — Uncle Winston
- "Don't Ever Stop Saying "I Love You" (Reprise)" — Ralph Halloran, Jane Hurley and Tom Hurley
- "Coney Island (Reprise)" — Uncle Winston and Company

== Roles and original cast ==
- Uncle Winston - Harvey Fierstein
- Aggie Hurley - Faith Prince
- Jane Hurley - Leslie Kritzer
- Tom Hurley - Tom Wopat
- Ralph Halloran - Matt Cavenaugh
- Mr. Halloran/Sam - Philip Hoffman
- Alice/Army Sergeant - Katie Klaus
- Delores/Caterer - Heather MacRae
- Mrs. Halloran/Pasha - Lori Wilner
- Myra/Dress Saleswoman - Kristine Zbornik

== Recording ==
The original cast recording was recorded by PS Classics and released on May 27, 2008.

== Critical response ==
A Catered Affair received mixed reviews.

Ben Brantley for The New York Times, wrote: "From Mr. Bucchino's trickling, self-effacing score to the tight-lipped stoicism of its leading performances, from David Gallo's tidy tenement-scape set to Zachary Borovay's tentative photographic projections, this show is all pale, tasteful understatement that seems to be apologizing for asking for your attention... Ms. Prince, best known for her madcap musical turns in revivals of Guys and Dolls and Bells Are Ringing, scrubs down to raw-skinned plainness here. Her performance is tight, disciplined and at times quite affecting, never more so than when Aggie looks silently at some distant horizon of missed opportunities."

Clive Barnes, reviewing for the New York Post, wrote: "Under John Doyle's expert, discreet direction, it emerges less like a musical and more like a play with music: lovely, urban chamber music. But you won't come out humming the tunes, or even the scenery. You'll come out humming the characters."

But Linda Winer, for Newsday, wrote: "How bold to make a Broadway musical on such restrained material as A Catered Affair. How sad that the results are so glum. Despite the dedication of a fine cast...this is a colorless little piece of '50s social realism about a Bronx family that isn't so much emotionally repressed as emotionally deficient." She panned the "meandering, conversational melodies ba[c]ked by innocuous accompaniments", and the "tasteful but bland production", and concluded: "Winston, who wants the big wedding, observes, 'Resigning oneself to small is sad. Requesting it is tragic.' He could be talking about the show."

== Awards and nominations ==
=== Original Broadway production ===
| Year | Award ceremony | Category | Nominee | Result |
|---|---|---|---|---|
| 2008 | Tony Award | Best Actor in a Musical | Tom Wopat | Nominated |
| 2008 | Tony Award | Best Actress in a Musical | Faith Prince | Nominated |
| 2008 | Tony Award | Best Orchestrations | Jonathan Tunick | Nominated |
| 2008 | Drama Desk Award | Outstanding Musical | | Nominated |
| 2008 | Drama Desk Award | Outstanding Book of a Musical | Harvey Fierstein | Nominated |
| 2008 | Drama Desk Award | Outstanding Actress in a Musical | Faith Prince | Nominated |
| 2008 | Drama Desk Award | Outstanding Featured Actor in a Musical | Tom Wopat | Nominated |
| 2008 | Drama Desk Award | Outstanding Featured Actress in a Musical | Leslie Kritzer | Nominated |
| 2008 | Drama Desk Award | Outstanding Director of a Musical | John Doyle | Nominated |
| 2008 | Drama Desk Award | Outstanding Orchestrations | Jonathan Tunick | Nominated |
| 2008 | Drama Desk Award | Outstanding Music | John Bucchino | Nominated |
| 2008 | Drama Desk Award | Outstanding Lyrics | John Bucchino | Nominated |
| 2008 | Drama Desk Award | Outstanding Set Design | David Gallo | Nominated |
| 2008 | Drama Desk Award | Outstanding Costume Design | Ann Hould-Ward | Nominated |
| 2008 | Drama Desk Award | Drama Desk Award for Outstanding Projection and Video Design | Zachary Borovay | Nominated |
| 2008 | Outer Critics Circle Award | Outstanding New Broadway Musical | | Nominated |
| 2008 | Outer Critics Circle Award | Outstanding Actress in a Musical | Faith Prince | Nominated |
| 2008 | Drama League Award | Outstanding New Broadway Musical | | Won |
| 2008 | Drama League Award | Distinguished Production of a Musical | | Won |
