= Harvey Fierstein =

American actor and playwright (born 1952)

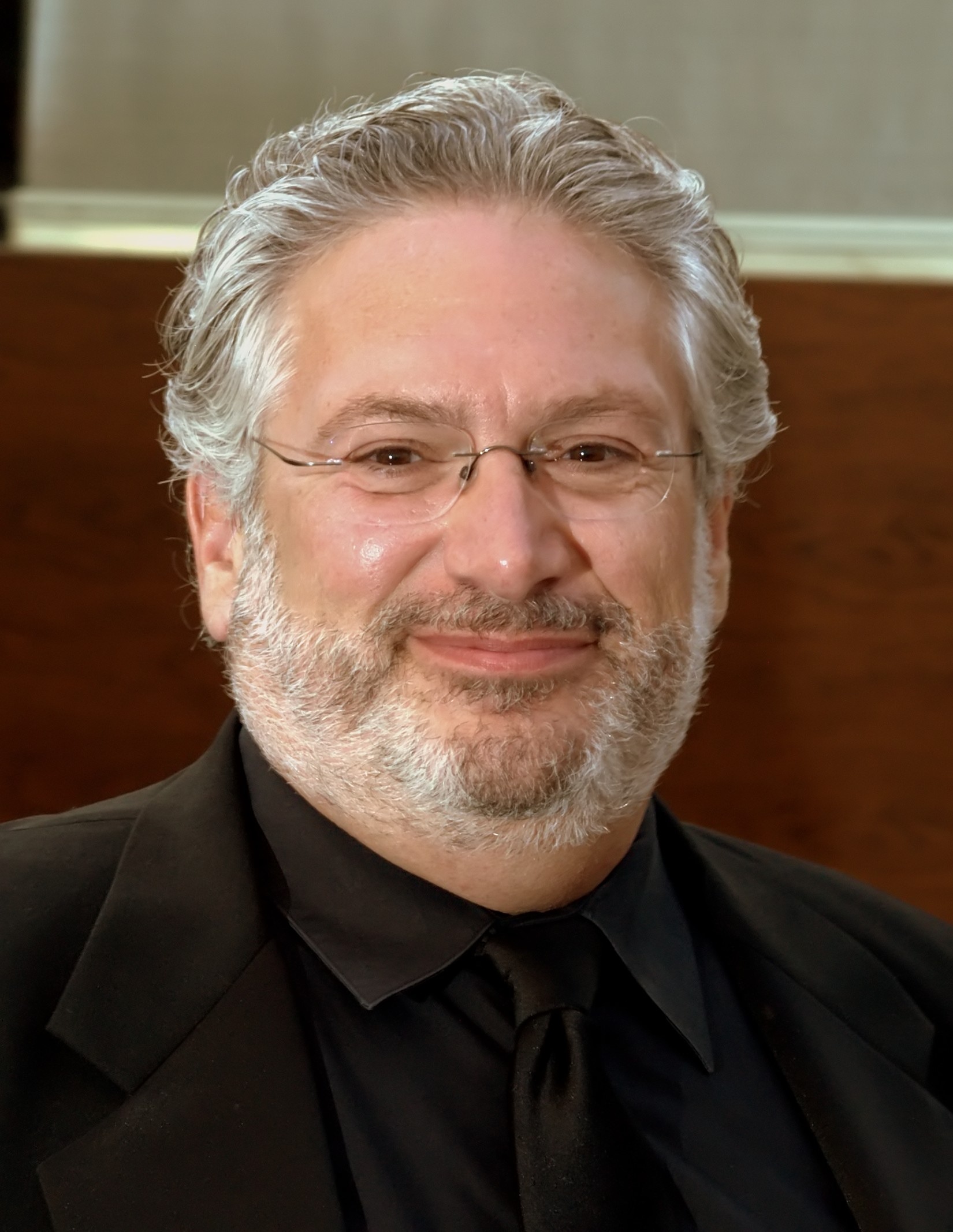
- Fierstein in 2009
- Born: Harvey Forbes Fierstein; June 6, 1952 (age 74); New York City, U.S.
- Education: Pratt Institute (BFA)
- Occupations: Actor; playwright; screenwriter
- Years active: 1981–present

Harvey Forbes Fierstein (/ˈfaɪərˌstiːn/ FIRE-steen; born June 6, 1952) is an American actor, playwright, and screenwriter, known for his distinctive gravelly voice. He gained notice for his theater work in Torch Song Trilogy, winning both the Tony Award for Best Play and Best Actor in a Play. He went on to win the Tony Award for Best Book of a Musical for La Cage aux Folles, then Best Actor in a Musical for playing Edna Turnblad in Hairspray, a role he reprised for the Hairspray Live! television special.

On film, he reprised his role in the film version of Torch Song Trilogy (1988), appeared in Mrs. Doubtfire, Independence Day, and as the voice of Yao in both Mulan and Mulan II.

Fierstein also wrote the books for the Tony Award-winning musicals Kinky Boots, Newsies, and Tony Award-nominated, Drama League Award-winner A Catered Affair. He was inducted into the American Theater Hall of Fame in 2007. In 2025 he was awarded a Lifetime Achievement Tony Award.

As one of the first openly gay celebrities in the United States, Fierstein helped turn gay and lesbian life into a viable subject for contemporary drama "with no apologies and no climactic suicides".

Fierstein's distinctive gravelly voice is a result of an overdeveloped vestibular fold in his vocal cords, essentially giving him a "double voice" when he speaks.

== Early life and education ==
Harvey Forbes Fierstein was born in Bensonhurst, Brooklyn, New York City, on June 6, 1952, the son of Jacqueline Harriet Gilbert, a school librarian, and Irving Fierstein, a handkerchief manufacturer. Fierstein has a brother, Ronald Fierstein. The family belonged to a Conservative Jewish temple. Prior to puberty, Fierstein was a soprano in a professional boys' choir.

Fierstein graduated from the High School of Art and Design and received a BFA from the Pratt Institute in 1973.

== Career ==
Fierstein has authored op-eds for The New York Times and the PBS series In the Life.

=== 1970s ===
Fierstein began working in the theater as a founding member of the Gallery Players of Park Slope before being cast in Andy Warhol's only play, Pork. Fierstein's other early roles included "a transvestite in his own Flatbush Tosca...a 300-year-old woman, Lillian Russell, and 26 other parts in Ronald Tavel's My Fetus Lived on Amboy Street". Fierstein also performed his own drag routine in Greenwich Village, including an impersonation of Ethel Merman singing "You Can't Get a Man With a Gun".

=== 1980s ===
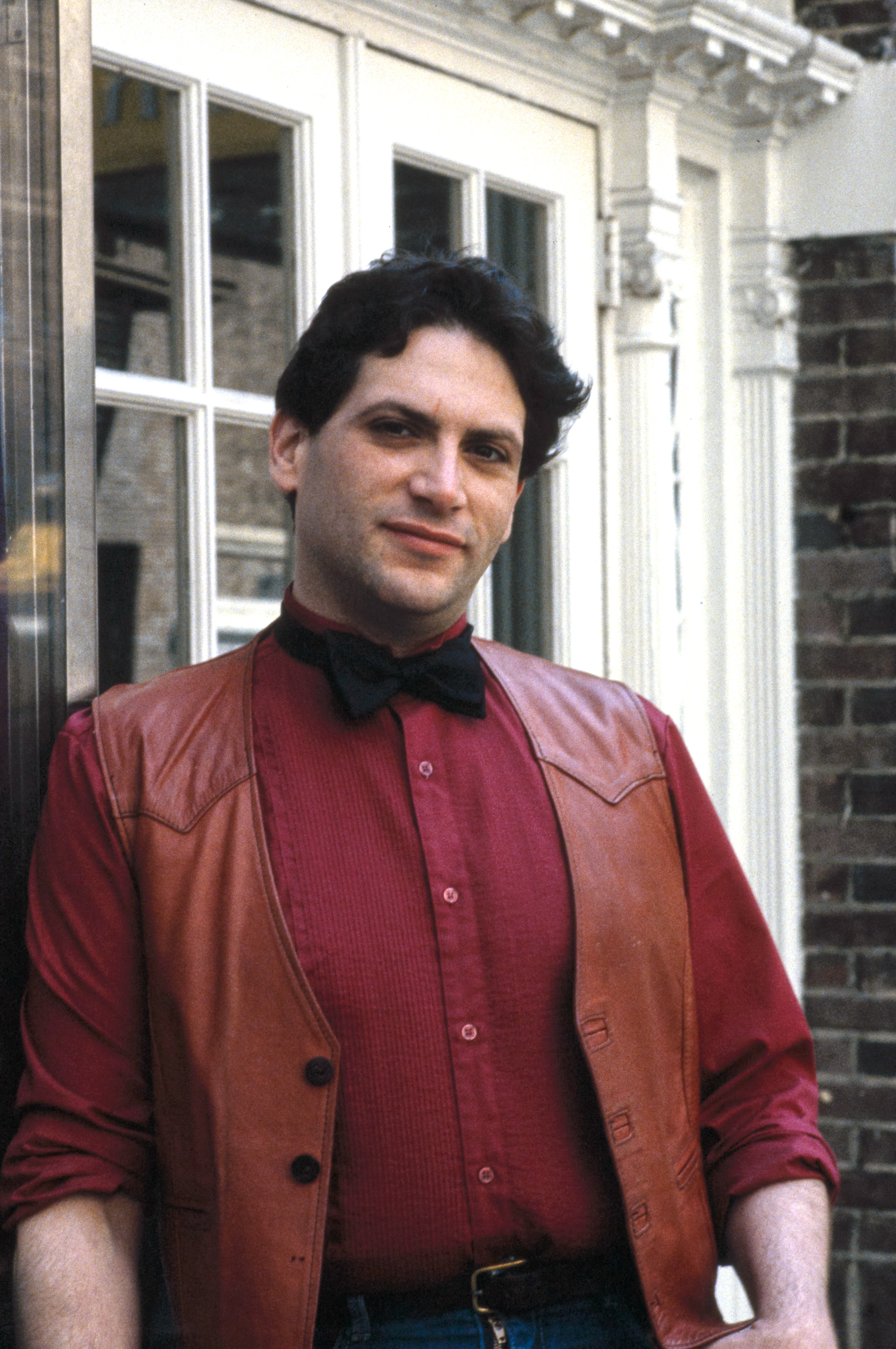
Fierstein in 1983

Fierstein is known for the play and film Torch Song Trilogy, which he wrote and starred in both off-Broadway (with a young Matthew Broderick) and on Broadway (with Estelle Getty and Fisher Stevens). The 1982 Broadway production won him two Tony Awards, for Best Play and Best Actor in a Play; two Drama Desk Awards, for Outstanding New Play and Outstanding Actor in a Play; and the Theatre World Award. Fierstein is the first openly gay actor to win a Tony Award for Best Actor in a Play. The film adaptation of Torch Song Trilogy earned him an Independent Spirit Award nomination as Best Male Lead.

Fierstein also wrote the book for La Cage aux Folles (1983), winning another Tony Award, this time for Best Book of a Musical, and a Drama Desk nomination for Outstanding Book. During his Tony Award acceptance speech, Fierstein acknowledged his male lover; according to Entertainment Weekly, this was "not a first", but was "still startling to many viewers".

Fierstein narrated the documentary The Times of Harvey Milk (1984), for which he won a News & Documentary Emmy Award. His playwriting credits include Spookhouse (1984), Safe Sex (1987), and Forget Him (1988). Legs Diamond, his 1988 collaboration with Peter Allen, was a critical and commercial failure, closing after 72 previews and 64 performances, but the songs live on in Peter Allen's biographical musical, The Boy from Oz.

=== 1990s ===
Fierstein was praised for his 1990 role as the voice of Karl, Homer Simpson's assistant, in the "Simpson and Delilah" episode of The Simpsons.

Fierstein portrayed Mark Newberger in Cheers, earning a Primetime Emmy Award nomination for Outstanding Supporting Actor in a Comedy Series in 1992.

In 1993, Fierstein co-starred with Mara Wilson, Lisa Jakub, Matthew Lawrence, Sally Field, Pierce Brosnan, and Robin Williams in Mrs. Doubtfire.

In 1994, Fierstein became the first gay actor to play a principal gay character in a television series when he appeared as fashion designer Dennis Sinclair in the short-lived CBS series Daddy's Girls.

Fierstein voiced the role of Yao in Disney's animated feature Mulan, a role he later reprised for the video game Kingdom Hearts II and the direct-to-DVD sequel Mulan II.

Fierstein voiced the character of Elmer in the 1999 HBO special based on his children's book The Sissy Duckling, which won the Humanitas Prize for Children's Animation.

=== 2000s ===
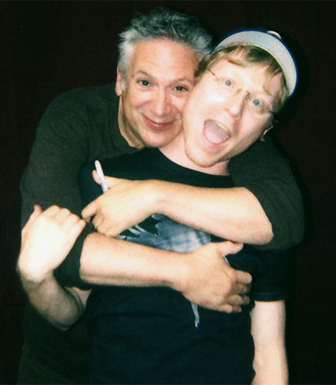
Fierstein (left) with Anthony Rapp at the Annual Flea Market and Grand Auction hosted by Broadway Cares/Equity Fights AIDS, September 2006

Fierstein's Broadway acting credits include playing the mother, Edna Turnblad, in Hairspray (2002), for which he won a Tony Award for Best Leading Actor in a Musical. He later replaced Alfred Molina as Tevye in the 2004 revival of Fiddler on the Roof.

In 2007, Fierstein wrote the book to the musical A Catered Affair; he also starred in the production. After tryouts at San Diego's Old Globe Theatre in September 2007, the show opened on Broadway April 17, 2008. It received 12 Drama Desk Award nominations and won the Drama League Award for Distinguished Production of a Musical.

Fierstein returned to the theater when he reprised the role of Tevye, replacing an injured Chaim Topol, in the national tour of Fiddler on the Roof starting in December 2009.

=== 2010s ===
On February 15, 2011, Fierstein replaced Douglas Hodge as Albin/Zaza in the Broadway revival of La Cage aux Folles. The show closed on May 1, 2011, after playing 433 performances and 15 previews.

Fierstein wrote the book for the stage musical Newsies, along with Alan Menken (music) and Jack Feldman (lyrics). The musical opened on Broadway in March 2012. Fierstein was nominated for the Tony Award for Book of a Musical.

Fierstein wrote the book for a stage musical version of the film Kinky Boots with music and lyrics by Cyndi Lauper. After a fall 2012 run at the Bank of America Theatre in Chicago, it opened at the Al Hirschfeld Theatre on Broadway in April 2013. The musical was nominated for thirteen 2013 Tony Awards and won six, including best musical.

Fierstein's play Casa Valentina was produced on Broadway by the Manhattan Theatre Club at the Samuel J. Friedman Theatre. The play opened in April 2014. It was directed by Joe Mantello, with a cast that featured Patrick Page, John Cullum, and Mare Winningham.

Fierstein wrote the teleplay for the December 3, 2015, NBC broadcast of The Wiz Live!, featuring Stephanie Mills as Aunt Em, Queen Latifah as The Wiz, and David Alan Grier as the Lion. The teleplay is an adaptation of The Wiz, which ran on Broadway from October 1974 until January 1979.

Fierstein then wrote the teleplay for, and starred in, the 2016 NBC TV broadcast of Hairspray Live! with Ariana Grande, Jennifer Hudson, Kristin Chenoweth, and Martin Short.

In April 2016, Fierstein, along with his Kinky Boots collaborator Cyndi Lauper, was honored with a star on the Hollywood Walk of Fame.

Fierstein wrote and starred in Bella Bella, a solo monologue play about New York Congresswoman Bella Abzug. It premiered at Manhattan Theatre Club's Stage One at City Center on October 1, 2019, directed by Kimberly Senior.

=== 2020s ===
Fierstein's book I Was Better Last Night: A Memoir was released on March 1, 2022, and quickly became a New York Times Bestseller.

== Personal life ==
Fierstein is openly gay. He reportedly dated journalist Ted Casablanca from 1987 to 1992.

Fierstein is Jewish. In 2005, he said that although he does not believe in God, he prays three or four times each day.

Fierstein has struggled with alcohol abuse. In a 2022 interview, he stated that he stopped drinking alcohol following a suicide attempt in 1996.

Speaking with People magazine in February 2022 to promote his memoir I Was Better Last Night, Fierstein stated, "I'm still confused as to whether I'm a man or a woman," and that as a child he often wondered if he had been born in the wrong body. "When I was a kid, I was attracted to men. I didn't feel like a boy was supposed to feel. Then I found out about gay. So that was enough for me for then". The interview also noted his ease at playing both Tevye in Fiddler on the Roof and Edna Turnblad in Hairspray. He avoided identifying as non-binary in the interview, saying he had thought about it a lot and "it's the term that bothers me", but concluded that "I don't think I've missed anything by not making up my mind". On the LGBTQ&A podcast the following month, Fierstein said, "I'm comfortable being me and if I ask myself, 'Would you want to transition?' The answer's no".

== Performances and works ==
=== Film ===
Year	Title	Role	Notes
1984	Garbo Talks	Bernie Whitlock	
1984	The Times of Harvey Milk	Narrator	Voice
1988	Torch Song Trilogy	Arnold Beckoff	Also the screenwriter (adapted his own play)
1992	The Harvest	Bob Lakin	
1993	Mrs. Doubtfire	Francis "Frank" Hillard	
1994	Bullets Over Broadway	Sid Loomis	
1995	Dr. Jekyll and Ms. Hyde	Yves DuBois	
1996	The Celluloid Closet	Himself	Documentary
1996	Independence Day	Marty Gilbert	
1996	Everything Relative	The Moyle	
1996	Elmo Saves Christmas	Easter Bunny	
1997	White Lies	Art Hoarder	
1997	Kull the Conqueror	Juba	
1997	Three Little Pigs	The Big Bad Wolf	Voice, short film
1998	Mulan	Yao	Voice
1998	Safe Men	Leo	
1999	Jump	Dish Macense	
2000	Playing Mona Lisa	Bennett	
2002	Death to Smoochy	Merv Green	
2003	Duplex	Kenneth	
2004	Mulan II	Yao	Voice, direct-to-video
2006	Farce of the Penguins	Sheila	Voice, direct-to-video
2012	Foodfight!	Fat Cat Burglar	Voice, direct-to-video
2014	Russian Broadway Shut Down	Book Writer	Short film
2017	Animal Crackers	Esmerelda	Voice
2020	Disarm Hate	Narrator	Voice, documentary
2022	Bros	Lewis	

=== Television ===
Year	Title	Role	Notes
1983	The Demon Murder Case	Demon	Voice, television film
1986	Miami Vice	Benedict	Episode: "The Fix"
1986	Apology	The Derelict	Television film
1988	Tidy Endings	Arthur	Television film
1990	The Simpsons	Karl	Voice, episode: "Simpson and Delilah"
1991	ABC Afterschool Specials	Andrew	Episode: "In the Shadow of Love: A Teen AIDS Story"
1992	Cheers	Mark Newberger	Episode: "Rebecca's Lover... Not"
1992	Murder, She Wrote	Stan Hatter	Episode: "The Dead File"
1994	Daddy's Girl	Dennis Sinclair	Series regular (3 episodes)
1997	The Larry Sanders Show	Himself	Episode: "The Matchmaker"
1997	Fame L.A.	Jeremy Pinter	Episode: "Do or Die"
1997	Happily Ever After: Fairy Tales for Every Child	Mrs. Leaperman	Voice, episode: "Thumbelina"
1998	Ellen	Himself	Episode: "It's a Gay, Gay, Gay, Gay World!"
1998	Hercules	Argus Panoptes	Voice, episode: "Hercules and the Bacchanal"
1998	Stories from My Childhood	Grambo	Voice, episode: "Alice and the Mystery of the Third Planet"
1999	Double Platinum	Gary Millstein	Television film
1999	The Sissy Duckling	Elmer	Voice, television film
2000	Common Ground	Don	Television film
2000	Behind the Music	Himself	Episode: "1984"
2004	Biography	Himself	Episode: "John Waters"
2004–07	Sesame Street	Himself	Recurring role (3 episodes)
2006	The Year Without a Santa Claus	Heat Miser	Television film
2008	Family Guy	Tracy	Voice, episode: "The Former Life of Brian"
2009	How I Met Your Mother	Lily's smoking voice	Voice, episode: "Last Cigarette Ever"
2010	Nurse Jackie	John Decker	Episode: "Monkey Bits"
2011	The Good Wife	Judge Francis Flamm	Episode: "Feeding the Rat"
2012	Submissions Only	Auditioner No. 5	Episode: "Another Interruption"
2013	Smash	Himself	Episode: "The Fallout"
2013	Watch What Happens Live with Andy Cohen	Himself	Episode: "Harvey Fierstein & Kim Zolciak"
2014	Saturday Night Live	Himself	Episode: "Bill Hader/Hozier"
2015	Family Guy	Buster Keaton	Voice, episode: "Stewie Is Enceinte"
2015	The Wiz Live!	—N/a	Television special (teleplay writer)
2016	Hairspray Live!	Edna Turnblad	Television special (teleplay writer)
2017	BoJack Horseman	Himself	Voice, episode: "Commence Fracking")
2018	Watch What Happens Live with Andy Cohen	Himself	Episode: "Jane Curtin & Harvey Fierstein"
2018–20	Big Mouth	Jerome	Voice, 2 episodes
2019	The Dark Crystal: Age of Resistance	The Gourmand	Voice, recurring role (7 episodes)

=== Theater ===
==== Acting ====
Year	Title	Role	Venue	Category
1982–1985	Torch Song Trilogy	Arnold Beckoff	Little Theatre	Broadway
1986	Torch Song Trilogy	Arnold Beckoff	Albery Theatre	West End
1987	Safe Sex	Ghee	Lyceum Theatre	Broadway
2002	Hairspray	Edna Turnblad	5th Avenue Theatre	Regional
2002–2004, 2008–2009	Hairspray	Edna Turnblad	Neil Simon Theatre	Broadway
2004–2006	Fiddler on the Roof	Tevye	Minskoff Theatre	Broadway
2008	A Catered Affair	Winston	Walter Kerr Theatre	Broadway
2009–2010	Fiddler on the Roof	Tevye	North American tour	
2011	La Cage aux Folles	Albin	Longacre Theatre	Broadway
2019	The Little Mermaid: An Immersive Live-to-Film Concert Experience	Ursula	Hollywood Bowl	Concert
2019	Bella Bella	Bella Abzug	Manhattan Theater Club	Off-Broadway
2022	Guys and Dolls	Joey Biltmore (prerecorded voice, uncredited)	The Kennedy Center	Washington, D.C.

==== Writing ====
Year	Title	Venue	Category	Notes
1982	Torch Song Trilogy	Little Theatre	Broadway	Also starred as Arnold
1983	La Cage aux Folles	Palace Theatre	Broadway	
1984	Spookhouse	Playhouse 91	Off-Broadway	
1987	Safe Sex	Lyceum Theatre	Broadway	Also starred as Ghee
1988	Legs Diamond	Mark Hellinger Theatre	Broadway	
2007	A Catered Affair	Old Globe Theatre	Broadway tryout	
2008	A Catered Affair	Walter Kerr Theatre	Broadway	Also starred as Winston
2011	Newsies	Paper Mill Playhouse	Broadway tryout	
2012	Newsies	Nederlander Theatre	Broadway	
2012	Kinky Boots	Bank of America Theatre	Broadway tryout	
2013	Kinky Boots	Al Hirschfeld Theatre	Broadway	
2014	Casa Valentina	Samuel J. Friedman Theatre	Broadway	
2015	Funny Girl	Menier Chocolate Factory	Off-West End	Book revisions
2016	Funny Girl	Savoy Theatre	West End	Book revisions
2022	Funny Girl	August Wilson Theatre	Broadway	Book revisions

=== Video games ===
Year	Title	Role	Notes
1998	Disney's Animated Storybook: Mulan	Yao	
1998	Mulan Story Studio	Yao	
2005	Kingdom Hearts II	Yao	English version
2007	Kingdom Hearts II Final Mix+	Yao	English version

== Awards and nominations ==
Year	Award	Category	Work	Result
1982	New York Drama Critics' Circle	Best American Play	Torch Song Trilogy	Nominated
1983	Tony Award	Best Play	Torch Song Trilogy	Won
1983	Tony Award	Best Actor in a Play	Torch Song Trilogy	Won
1983	Drama Desk Award	Outstanding Play	Torch Song Trilogy	Won
1983	Drama Desk Award	Outstanding Actor in a Play	Torch Song Trilogy	Won
1983	Theatre World Award	Theatre World Award	Torch Song Trilogy	Won
1984	Tony Award	Best Book of a Musical	La Cage aux Folles	Won
1984	Drama Desk Award	Outstanding Book of a Musical	La Cage aux Folles	Nominated
1992	Primetime Emmy Award	Outstanding Supporting Actor in a Comedy Series	Cheers	Nominated
2003	Tony Award	Best Actor in a Musical	Hairspray	Won
2003	Drama Desk Award	Outstanding Actor in a Musical	Hairspray	Won
2003	Outer Critics Circle Award	Outstanding Actor in a Musical	Hairspray	Nominated
2003	Drama League Award	Outstanding Performance	Hairspray	Won
2008	Drama League Award	Outstanding Production of a Musical	A Catered Affair	Won
2008	Drama Desk Award	Outstanding Book of a Musical	A Catered Affair	Nominated
2012	Tony Award	Best Book of a Musical	Newsies	Nominated
2012	Outer Critics Circle Award	Outstanding Book of a Musical	Newsies	Nominated
2013	Tony Award	Best Book of a Musical	Kinky Boots	Nominated
2013	Outer Critics Circle Award	Outstanding Book of a Musical	Kinky Boots	Nominated
2014	Tony Award	Best Play	Casa Valentina	Nominated
2025	Tony Award	Lifetime Achievement Tony Award		Won

== See also ==
- List of atheists in film, radio, television and theater
- LGBT culture in New York City
- List of LGBT people from New York City
