= Tissue-pack marketing =

Type of guerrilla marketing

A man handing out advertising tissues to passersby in Tokyo

Tissue-pack marketing (ティッシュ配り, Tisshukubari) is a type of guerrilla marketing that attaches advertisements to portable facial tissue packages to move advertising copy directly into consumers' hands. Its origins date back to the late 1960s in Japan as a replacement for free promotional matchboxes, which were falling out of favor.

== History ==
The concept of tissue-pack marketing was first developed in Japan. Its origins date back to the late 1960s when Hiroshi Mori, founder of a paper-goods manufacturer Meisei Industrial Co., was looking for ways to expand demand for paper products. At the time, the most common promotional item in Japan was matchboxes. These were often given away at banks and then used by women in the kitchen. However, the usefulness of matches waned with the rise of gas stoves and disposable lighters. Mori believed that tissues would have even wider appeal than the matches, and as a result he developed the machinery to fold and package tissues into easy-to-carry, pocket-size packs. The new product was marketed only as a form of advertising and was not sold to consumers. By the mid-2000s, it was estimated that four billion free packets of tissues were distributed in Japan with sales in the range of ¥75 billion annually. However, the practice began to slow considerably only a few years later. By 2010, Meisei's own production of the packets had decreased by more than half compared to six years prior and promotions company Cerebrix reduced their tissue distribution by half compared to 2008. Consumers having other similar products on hand as well as companies cutting back on advertising spending were cited as reasons for decline in tissue-pack marketing. Other free seasonal promotional giveaways such as uchiwa fans, wet wipes, cellphone screen wipes, and cloth face masks furthered the decline of the tissue's usage as a promotional item.

Since its creation in Japan, tissue-pack marketing has spread overseas. It was introduced in Montreal, Canada, in December 2000 by Promotion Par Main. In April 2005, the promotional product was also used in Ontario, Canada, by Hold'em Promotions Inc., after the company's founders saw tissue advertising during a trip to China. In the United States, a subsidiary of the Japanese trading company Itochu, AdPack USA, introduced tissue-pack marketing in New York in 2005, and now offers it throughout the country. In 2012, the tissue marketing company Adtishoo launched operations in the United Kingdom.

== Benefits ==
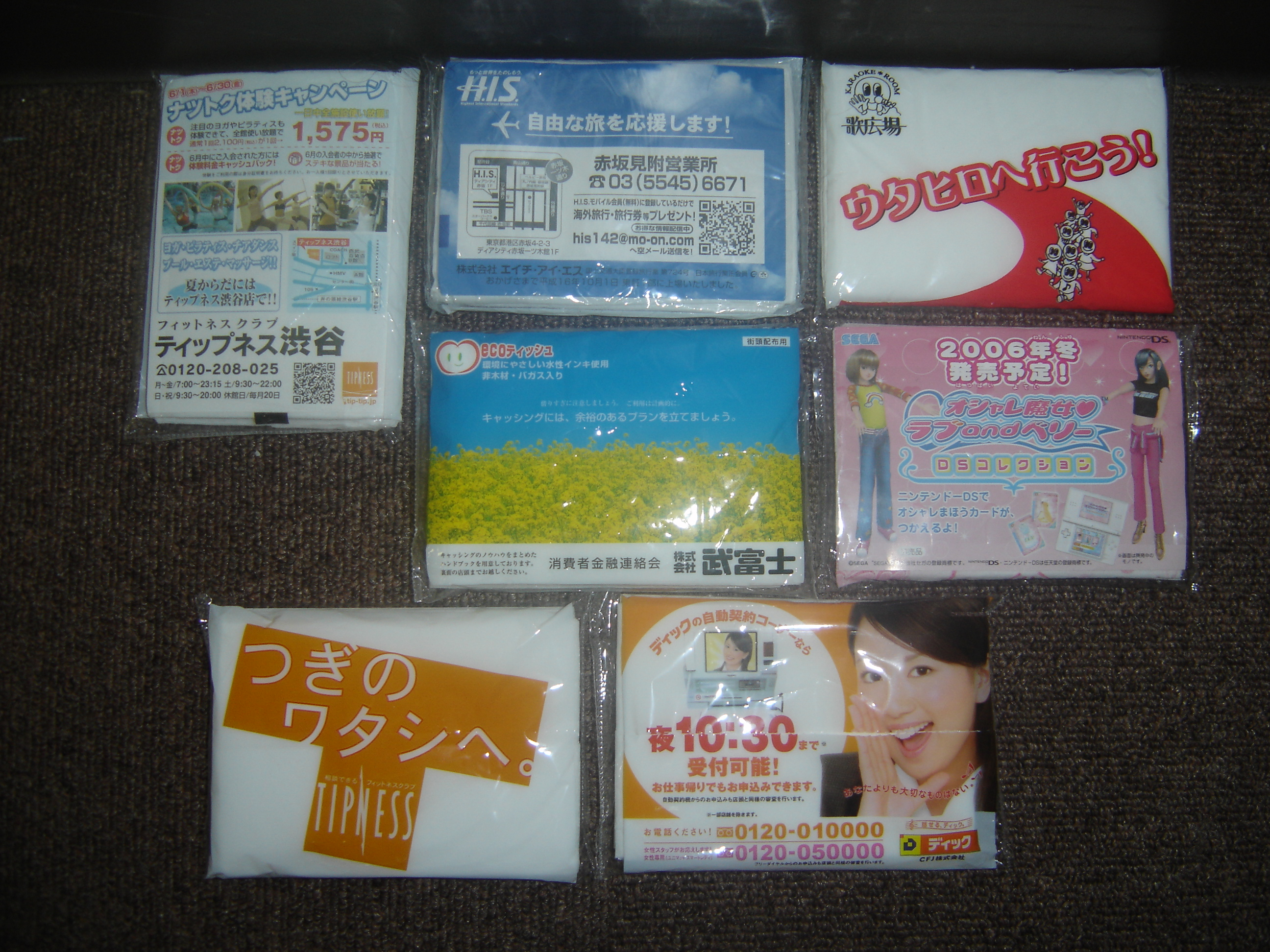
A variety of advertising tissue packages

Where the more traditional flyers are often discarded without being read or simply not accepted by the consumer, the same is not true of advertising tissue-packs. The most important reason for this is because the tissues add functionality to the advertisement. This functionality has several benefits:

- Gets the ad into consumers' hands

In an Internet survey of over 100,000 Japanese consumers conducted by Marsh Research, 76% said they accept free tissues. This is a much higher rate than either fliers or leaflets.

- Gets consumers to read/look at the advert after they have accepted it

In the same study referenced above, of those that accepted the tissue-pack, slightly more than half of the participants said they either "definitely look" or "at least glance at" the advertisement. One possible reason for this increased statistic when compared to fliers is that consumers were hoping to find coupons or special offers packaged inside with the tissues.

- Helps consumers to retain the ad and its message

The advertisement on the package is more likely to be retained by the consumer because they are being consistently exposed to it.

== See also ==
- Tissue paper
- Out-of-home advertising
- Communications in Japan
- Marketing strategies
