= The Plough and the Stars (film) =

1937 film directed by John Ford

- Film poster
- Directed by: John Ford
- Written by: Dudley Nichols; Seán O'Casey
- Produced by: Cliff Reid
- Starring: Barbara Stanwyck; Preston Foster
- Cinematography: Joseph H. August
- Edited by: George Hively
- Music by: Roy Webb
- Distributed by: RKO Radio Pictures
- Release date: January 15, 1937
- Running time: 72 minutes
- Country: United States
- Language: English

The Plough and the Stars is a 1937 American drama film directed by John Ford and starring Barbara Stanwyck and Preston Foster. It is based on the play of the same name written by Seán O'Casey.

== Plot ==
The Spring of 1916 found a divided Ireland, torn by conflicting Loyalties. Thousands of her sons were at the front fighting the cause of England in the World War. Other thousands remained home planning another fight---a fight, under the flag of the Plough and the Stars, to free their country so that Ireland could take its place among the nations of the world.

— Opening scroll

Nora Clitheroe runs a rooming house in Dublin while trying to avoid the political turmoil raging around her in revolutionary Ireland. However, she discovers that her husband Jack has joined a militia of Irish rebels seeking to oust the British from Ireland. Nora fears for Jack's safety and begs him to keep his distance from the revolutionary forces. Despite Jack's promises to Nora that he will cease his participation with the rebels, he becomes a commander with the Irish Citizen Army as it plans to occupy the Dublin General Post Office as part of the Easter Rising.

== Cast ==
- Barbara Stanwyck as Nora Clitheroe
- Preston Foster as Jack Clitheroe
- Barry Fitzgerald as Fluther Good
- Denis O'Dea as The Young Covey
- Eileen Crowe as Bessie Burgess
- F. J. McCormick as Capt. Brennan
- Una O'Connor as Maggie Gogan
- Arthur Shields as Padraig Pearse
- Moroni Olsen as James Connolly
- J. M. Kerrigan as Peter Flynn
- Bonita Granville as Mollser Gogan
- Erin O'Brien-Moore as Rosie Redmond
- Neil Fitzgerald as Lt. Langon
- Robert Homans as Timmy the Barman
- Brandon Hurst as Sgt. Tinley
- Cyril McLaglen as Cpl. Stoddard
- Wesley Barry as Sniper
- D'Arcy Corrigan as Priest
- Mary Gordon as Woman at Barricades
- Doris Lloyd as Woman at Barricades

== Production ==
=== Casting ===
Director John Ford wished to reuse the entire cast of the original Abbey Theatre play for the film, but RKO insisted upon proven stars for the leading roles and cast Barbara Stanwyck for the lead female role as well as a supporting cast of mostly Irish actors, including some who had appeared in the play.

MGM had originally agreed to lend Spencer Tracy to RKO for the lead role, but just before filming was to begin, Tracy withdrew from the project "because the part wasn't good enough." MGM had also become hesitant following Tracy's breakout success in the 1936 films Fury and San Francisco. To remain on schedule, RKO swiftly cast Preston Foster in place of Tracy.

Stanwyck was dismayed about her rather minor speaking part in the film and, during rehearsals, told Ford, "I can walk through this part." Ford used her remark derisively against her throughout filming.

Arthur Shields, who plays Padraig Pearse in the film, participated in the actual Easter Rising rebellion as a youth.

=== Filming ===
The play as originally presented on the Dublin stage contained a great deal of broad satire approaching farce, but the comedic aspects were removed entirely for the screenplay.

Production of the film began on July 6, 1936.

Ford prohibited the actors from wearing makeup in order to deliver a sense of realism. Stanwyck at first refused to appear without makeup but relented.

Ford was enraged with RKO over the film's casting and the softening of the story's political message. After the film's release, Ford complained that the studio "completely ruined the damned thing."

== Reception ==
In a contemporary review for The New York Times, critic Frank S. Nugent called the film "a freely translated version which has realized part of the play's intent but missed more of it" and wrote: Mr. O'Casey was not interested in glorifying the Easter rebellion of 1916; he thought it tragic and foolhardy and pitiful. He could not pretend that all the men and women of Dublin were heroic martyrs to a magnificent cause; he recognized sardonically that, while some went out to orate, to fight and to die, others dived from the shelter of their tenement warrens to the shelter of their pubs, bickering and carping, stooping to a bit of plunder when they had the chance. The RKO-Radio edition has softened Mr. O'Casey's ironical thrusts by seeing no more in his play than appeared on its surface.

Variety described the film as "skillfully made but not impressive" and felt that in adapting the play to the screen, the "tragic original had been modified into a romantic melodrama." The review commented on some of the performers and said that the film calls "for an actress of considerable [sic] more gifts than Barbara Stanwyck indicates she possesses", Barry Fitzgerald "has a joyful time", Bonita Granville "excellently plays a small part of a sickly tenement child", and Una O'Connor, Erin O'Brien-Moore and Eileen Crowe were commended for their performances.

In their March, 1937 edition, Modern Screen gave the film a two-star review and commented, "This film, directed by John Ford, who made The Informer, will be a distinct disappointment to most of his followers, for it lacks the vitality, the excitement and the fine performances which made The Informer one of the best pictures in the last several years." Barbara Stanwyck’s performance was described as "rather subdued throughout" and "doesn’t seem to be as inspired as usual." Barry Fitzgerald was credited as providing "most of the high points" for his comedic portrayal and Una O’Connor and J. M. Kerrigan were described as "excellent" in their smaller roles.

== See also ==
- The Informer (1935 film), a film also directed by John Ford and set in revolutionary Ireland
