= A Man Is Ten Feet Tall =

- The Philco Television Playhouse episode
- Episode no.: Season 8 Episode 3
- Directed by: Robert Mulligan
- Written by: Robert Alan Aurthur
- Original air date: October 2, 1955
- Running time: 52 mins

"A Man is Ten Feet Tall" is a 1955 American television play by Robert Alan Aurthur. It was adapted into the 1957 film Edge of the City.

The play is considered a landmark in American television because it featured a friendship between a black man and a white man, as well as providing an early star role for Sidney Poitier. Poitier wrote in his memoirs the role as a personal triumph for him, although he briefly forgot his lines during the broadcast.

== Cast ==
- Sidney Poitier
- Don Murray
- Florence Anglin
- Martin Balsam
- Joe Comadore
- Don Gordon
- Joanna Douglas
- Betty McDonald
- Kathleen Murray
- Hilda Simms
- Michael Strong
- Edward Walsh
- Meg Wyllie

== Reception ==
Variety wrote "That’s not to say that it lacked exciting elements. But over and above the script itself (and a part of it, of course, as far as intentions go) was what seemed an unprecedented item that may be looked upon years hence in tv as parallel to a major decision of a higher tribunal. It may well be Aurthur’s supreme contribution to television."

Donald Bogle noted the play was a landmark in its depiction of black characters although it "now looks like a prototype for Hollywood's fake idealized method for handling such Black/white friendships."
