= The Lost Man =

1969 film by Robert Alan Aurthur

- Theatrical release poster
- Directed by: Robert Alan Aurthur
- Screenplay by: Robert Alan Aurthur
- Based on: Odd Man Out by F.L. Green
- Produced by: Edward Muhl; Melville Tucker
- Starring: Sidney Poitier; Joanna Shimkus; Al Freeman Jr. Michael Tolan
- Cinematography: Gerald Perry Finnerman
- Edited by: Edward Mann
- Music by: Quincy Jones
- Production company: Universal Pictures
- Distributed by: Universal Pictures
- Release dates: June 25, 1969 (New York City); July 11, 1969 (United States)
- Running time: 122 minutes
- Country: United States
- Language: English
- Box office: $1.85 million (US/ Canada rentals)

The Lost Man is a 1969 American crime film, written and directed by Robert Alan Aurthur, loosely based on British author F.L. Green's 1945 novel Odd Man Out, which was previously made into a 1947 film directed by Carol Reed and starring James Mason.

== Plot ==
Former US Army lieutenant Jason Higgs, after becoming a black militant during the 1960s Black Revolutionary Movement, is wounded as he pulls a payroll heist to help imprisoned brothers, and has to hide from the police. Social worker Cathy Ellis falls in love with Higgs while helping him elude capture.

== Cast ==
- Sidney Poitier as Jason Higgs
- Joanna Shimkus as Cathy Ellis
- Al Freeman Jr. as Dennis Lawrence
- Michael Tolan as Inspector Hamilton
- Richard Dysart as Bernie
- David Steinberg as The Photographer
- Paul Winfield as Orville Turner
- Beverly Todd as Sally Carter / Dorothy Starr
- Vonetta McGee as Diane Lawrence
- Frank Marth as Warren

== Critical response ==
New York Times critic Vincent Canby called the film "Poitier's attempt to recognize the existence and root causes of black militancy without making anyone — white or black — feel too guilty or hopeless." Canby also included the movie in his list of “ten worst films of 1969” for the paper: “The film was better when it starred James Mason and was directed Carol Reed [1947], but it has some importance as containing Poitier’s first performance as a black militant in contemporary America….’The Lost Man’ doesn’t really want to alienate anybody.” Roger Ebert wrote that "Poitier has seldom been stronger or more human." but criticized the film for "a tendency to smooth corners and tinker with the plot."

== Musical score and soundtrack ==
The Lost Man

Soundtrack album by Quincy Jones
- Released: 1969
- Recorded: 1969
- Genre: Film score
- Length: 33:54
- Labels: Uni; UNI 73060
- Producers: Quincy Jones, Stanley Wilson

Quincy Jones chronology
The Italian Job (1969)	The Lost Man (1969)	Walking in Space (1969)

The film score was composed by Quincy Jones and conducted by Stanley Wilson, and the soundtrack album was released on the Uni label in 1969.

=== Reception ===
Professional ratings
Review scores
Source	Rating
Allmusic	4/5 stars

Allmusic's Brandon Burke said, "In the strict sense of the word, The Lost Man was not a blaxploitation film, but its soundtrack (arranged by Quincy Jones) might lead you to think otherwise. ... Jones takes the sparse, groove-oriented route heard on the J.J. Johnson scores for Cleopatra Jones and Across 110th Street. This is most evident on downtempo numbers like the sultry "Sweet Soul Sister" (featuring Nate Turner & the Mirettes) and the opening theme. "Main Squeeze," however, is a funk bomb if ever there was one and, thankfully, its bass-driven motif runs throughout the LP. Recommended if you can find it".

=== Track listing ===
All compositions by Quincy Jones except where noted

1. "The Lost Man (Main Title)" (Lyrics by Dick Cooper, Ernie Shelby) – 2:35
2. "Sweet Soul Sister" (Lyrics by Cooper, Shelby) – 2:48
3. "Slum Creeper" – 3:22
4. "Rap, Run It on Down" (Lyrics by Cooper, Shelby) – 2:31
5. "He Says He Loves Me" (Lyrics by Diane Hilderbrand, Cooper, Shelby) – 3:45
6. "Main Squeeze" – 2:48
7. "Try, Try, Try" (Lyrics by Cooper, Shelby) – 2:46
8. "Need to Be Needed" – 4:46
9. "Up Against the Wall" – 4:20
10. "He'll Wash You Whiter than Snow" (Cora Martin) – 2:15
11. "End Title" – 1:58

=== Personnel ===
- Unidentified orchestra arranged by Quincy Jones and conducted by Stanley Wilson including:
  - Ernestine Anderson (track 5), The Church Choir (track 10), Venetta Fields (tracks 4 & 7), Geraldine Jones (track 11), The kids from PASLA (track 1), The Mirettes (tracks 2, 4 & 7), The Pree Sisters (track 5), Nate Turner (tracks 2 & 4) − vocals
  - Ray Brown − bass (track 11)
  - Arthur Adams − guitar (track 11)
  - Emil Richards − percussion
  - Carol Kaye − electric bass
  - Bud Shank − saxophone

== See also ==
- List of American films of 1969
- List of hood films
