= Robert Alan Aurthur =

American screenwriter and playwright (1922–1978)

- Born: June 10, 1922; New York City, New York, U.S.
- Died: November 20, 1978 (aged 56); New York City, New York, U.S.
- Occupations: Screenwriter, playwright, producer, director
- Spouse: Bea Arthur (m. 1944; div. 1950)

Robert Alan Aurthur (June 10, 1922 – November 20, 1978) was an American screenwriter, playwright, and film and television producer. Described as “one of the leading dramatists of the golden age of television,” he rose to prominence for his work on the anthology programs The Philco Television Playhouse and Goodyear Television Playhouse, earning an Emmy Award nomination for the former in 1956. He transitioned to feature films with the crime drama Edge of the City (1959), starring Sidney Poitier.

Aurthur's subsequent film credits included Warlock (1959), Grand Prix (1966), and the Poitier vehicles For Love of Ivy (1968) and The Lost Man (1969). The latter was his sole directorial effort. He also wrote the Broadway musical Kwamina. He died in 1978 during the production of All That Jazz, and posthumously received Academy Award nominations for Best Picture and Best Original Screenplay for his work.

== Early life ==
Raised in Freeport, New York (on Long Island), he was a pre‐med student at the University of Pennsylvania. Once World War II broke out, he left to join the Marines during which he served as a combat correspondent.

== Career ==
=== Television ===
In the early years of television, he wrote for Studio One and then moved on to write episodes of Mister Peepers (1952–53). He followed with teleplays for Goodyear Television Playhouse (1953–54), The Campbell Playhouse (1954), Justice (1954) and Producers' Showcase (1955). One of his four 1951–55 plays for The Philco Television Playhouse was the Emmy-nominated "A Man Is Ten Feet Tall" (1955), with Don Murray and Sidney Poitier, which was adapted two years later as the theatrical film, Edge of the City (1957) with Poitier and John Cassavetes.

He wrote two teleplays for Playhouse 90. One of them, A Sound of Different Drummers (October 3, 1957), borrowed so heavily from Ray Bradbury's Fahrenheit 451 that Bradbury sued.

Aurthur appeared with Merle Miller in David Susskind's 2012 documentary about President Harry S. Truman titled Give 'em Hell, Harry, stating: "Going into a Howard Johnson's was bad enough, but with a President!" They discussed George Marshall, Dwight Eisenhower, and Richard Nixon, as well as their observations on Truman's respect for Marshall.

=== Film ===
After 1957, Aurthur continued to write screenplays. He was one of the writers on Spring Reunion (1957), Betty Hutton's final film, following with Warlock (1959), and his earlier association with Cassavetes led to script contributions on the actor's directorial debut with Shadows (1959). After an uncredited contribution to Lilith (1964), he scripted John Frankenheimer's Grand Prix (1966).

He wrote two more vehicles for Sidney Poitier, For Love of Ivy (1968) and The Lost Man (1969). The latter, a remake of the 1947 British film Odd Man Out, was also Aurthur's sole directorial effort.

In 1974, Aurthur was approached by his friend Bob Fosse to adapt the Hilma Wolitzer novel Ending into a feature film. The project eventually evolved into the semi-autobiographical All That Jazz. Aurthur died before production was completed, but was posthumously nominated for both Best Picture and Best Original Screenplay for his work.

=== Theatre ===
Three plays written by Aurthur were produced on Broadway: A Very Special Baby (1956), Kwamina (1961), and Carry Me Back to Morningside Heights (1968). Kwamina was a collaboration with composer and lyricist Richard Adler, starring Adler's wife, Sally Ann Howes. The subject material, an interracial love affair, proved too controversial and the show closed. Carry Me Back to Morningside Heights was directed by Sidney Poitier and starred African-American stars Louis Gossett Jr. and Cicely Tyson; the plot involved a young Jewish man who insisted on becoming a slave to an African-American law student as a penance for the years of wrongs whites have done to blacks. It closed after seven performances.

== Personal life ==
Aurthur was the first husband of actress Beatrice Arthur, who also served in the Marines; they divorced in 1950 and had no children. She used a variation of his surname as her professional name.

His second wife was Virginia Aurthur. One of their children was Jonathan Aurthur (1948–2004), who died by suicide eight years after his own son (Robert and Virginia's grandson) had committed suicide, and about which Jonathan Aurthur had written a book. At the time of his death, Robert Alan Aurthur was married to Jane Wetherell Aurthur, a former television producer; they had one daughter, Kate Aurthur, who as of 2019 is an editor-at-large at Variety.

=== Death ===
Aurthur died of lung cancer in New York City in 1978, aged 56. In 2009, his former wife, Bea Arthur, died of the same disease, aged 86.

== Filmography ==
=== Film ===
Year	Title	Functioned as		Director	Notes
Year	Title	Writer	Producer	Director	Notes
1956	Spring Reunion	Story	No	Robert Pirosh	
1957	Edge of the City	Yes	No	Martin Ritt	
1958	Shadows	Uncredited	No	John Cassavetes	Additional dialogue
1959	Warlock	Yes	No	Edward Dmytryk	
1964	Lilith	Uncredited	No	Robert Rossen	
1966	Grand Prix	Yes	No	John Frankenheimer	
1968	For Love of Ivy	Yes	No	Daniel Mann	
1969	The Lost Man	Yes	No	Himself	Also director
1979	All That Jazz	Yes	Yes	Bob Fosse	

== Awards and nominations ==
Ceremony	Category	Work	Result	Ref.
52nd Academy Awards	Best Picture	All That Jazz	Nominated (posthumous)	
52nd Academy Awards	Best Original Screenplay	All That Jazz	Nominated (posthumous)	
8th Primetime Emmy Awards	Best Original Teleplay Writing	The Philco Television Playhouse ("A Man Is Ten Feet Tall")	Nominated	
