= F. J. McCormick =

Irish actor

F.J.McCormick
- publicity still for Odd Man Out (1947)
- Born: Peter Judge; 1 June 1890; Skerries, County Dublin, Ireland
- Died: 24 April 1947 (aged 56); Dublin, Ireland
- Occupation: Actor
- Spouse: Eileen Crowe

F. J. McCormick (real name Peter Christopher Judge) (1 June 1890 in Skerries, County Dublin, Ireland – 24 April 1947 in Dublin, Ireland) was an Irish actor who became known for his work at Dublin's Abbey Theatre. He acquired the stage name F.J. McCormick to disguise his identity from his current and future employers, and to avoid parental disapproval. He joined the Abbey at age 19, and acted in some 500 productions there. He is especially remembered for his work in the plays of Seán O'Casey.

== Early life and family ==
After living in Skerries in his early years, at age 10 he moved to Dublin and proceeded to live here for the majority of the duration of his life. He was educated locally in Skerries. His father, Michael Judge, was a maltser and later became a brewery manager. McCormick was of medium height, with "expressive eyes" and thick brown hair. As a young man, he began writing by contributing articles to the press. He worked briefly as a post office clerk in London but returned to Dublin to work as a junior clerk in the Civil Service. Eventually, he resigned from his public service career in 1918 and decided to embrace acting as a full-time career as a member of the Abbey Theatre at age 19.

McCormick's mother died when he was 2 years old. He and his family moved to Dublin when he was 10 or 12 years old. He was raised in Skerries and attended the Holy Faith Convent for primary education. McCormick described his childhood in Skerries "as a very happy one". He married Eileen Crowe on 2 December 1925 in Rathdown. They met at the Abbey where Crowe was also an actor. In describing their performances together, De Burca wrote "F.J McCormick and Eileen Crowe lived a life together of perfect bliss". The couple had two children, a son, David, and a daughter, Marie.

== Career ==
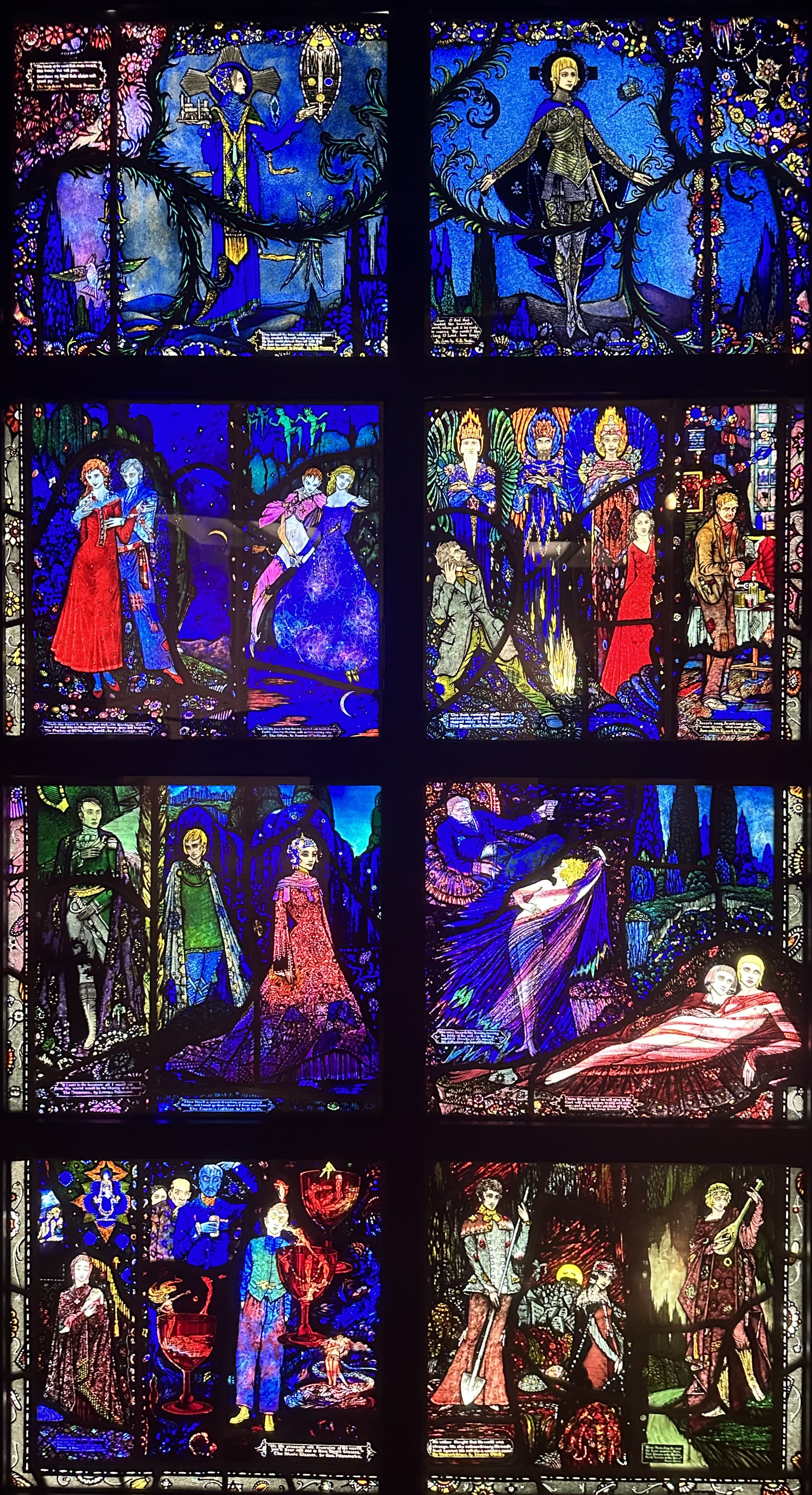
McCormick as Joxer in Juno and the Paycock, depicted in stained glass by Harry Clarke

After moving briefly to London, McCormick returned to Dublin, where he worked in the Civil Service. He also took acting roles in the Workmen's Club on York Street, and for the first time under the pseudonym by which he became known for roles with the Queen's Theatre, Dublin. By May 1919, he had a leading role in an independent production at the Abbey Theatre (The Curate of St. Chad's by Constance Powell Anderson). An attack on Irish acting by Edward Martyn was answered by McCormick in the pages of the journal Banba in June, 1921.

McCormick acted in over 500 plays at the Abbey Theatre, becoming particularly associated with the plays of Sean O'Casey staged there. From 1923 to 1925, he was also stage manager at the Abbey. Of his performance as Seumus Sheilds in The Shadow of a Gunman, O'Casey said that the actor had created a character greater than that O'Casey had written. He played Capt. Brennan in the filmed version of O'Casey's The Plough and the Stars but it was his return to film in Carol Reed's Odd Man Out (1947) that saw him singled out for praise in contemporaneous reviews. The Irish Times wrote that "the acting of the Irish players was unremittingly professional, and, in the case of F. J. McCormick, as Shell, a weak-minded and elderly corner-boy, quite outstanding." The Times of London found "it is Mr. F. J. McCormick as a sly, bird-like creature, who stops just the right side of informing, who catches most surely at the imagination."

In their review of the film Hungry Hill (also 1947), The New York Times wrote, "As the butler who served John Brodrick, his sons, and their sons in turn, the late F. J. McCormick is truly magnificent, giving an even more subtle portrayal of Irish character than he did as the wily tramp in Odd Man Out."

== Later life and death ==
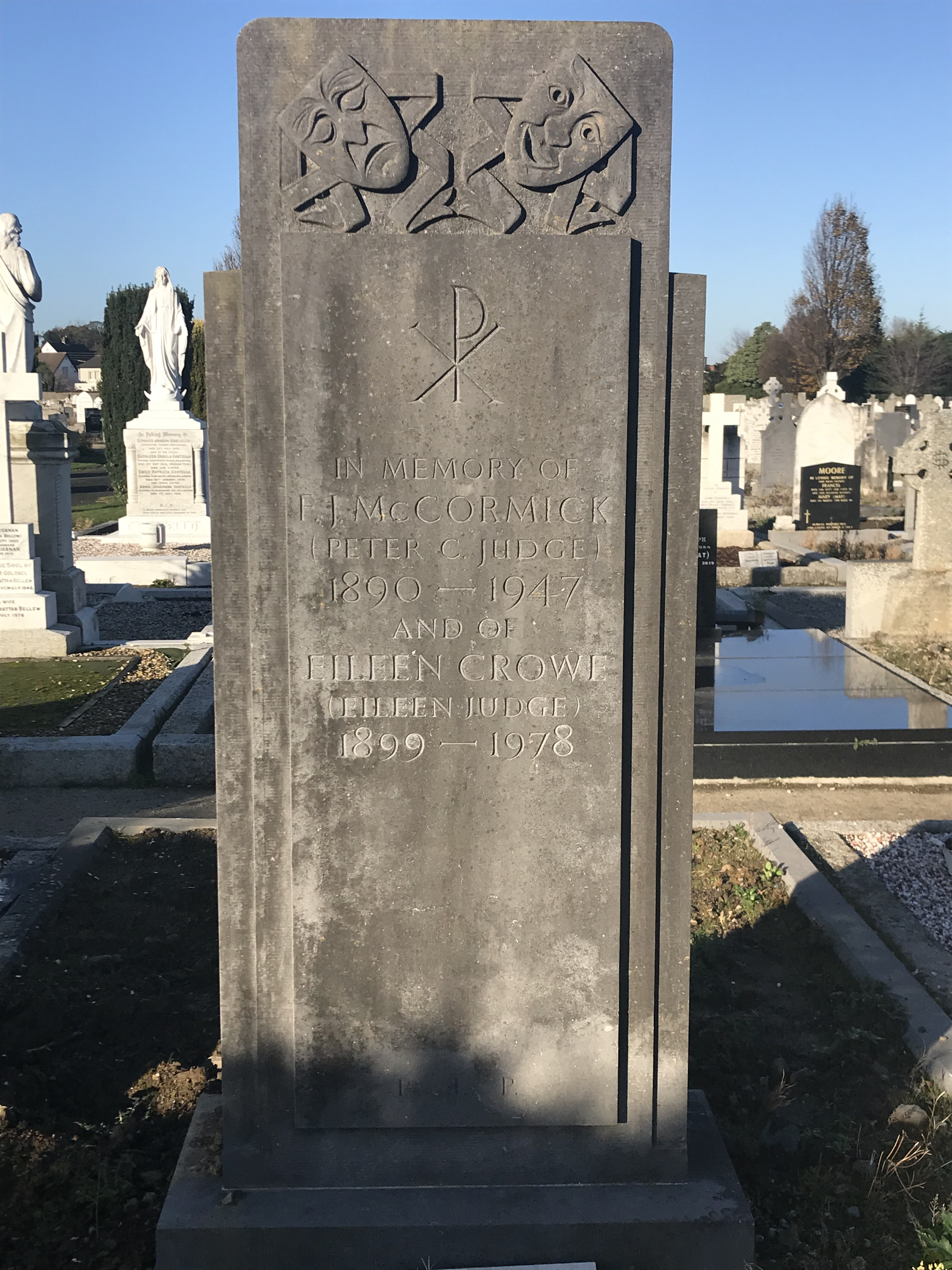
McCormick's grave, Deansgrange cemetery, Dublin

In the last 5 years of McCormick's life he continued to work in the Abbey where he acted in over 70 plays before he died. He only starred in one play in the theatre in the final year of his life, the play They Got What They Wanted playing the role of Bartley Murnaghan. He secured more leading roles in the film industry. McCormick died on the 24 April 1947 from a brain tumour at 56 years old, in Dublin. He is buried in Deansgrange, Blackrock. He continued to work right up until his death.

It is said that people regarded him as one of the greatest actors in his era. This comes from his work in 500 plays and 4 films over his career. A year after his death in 1948 Barry Fitzgerald said he only knew of two actors with the gift that McCormick had and they were Charles Laughton and Charlie Chaplin.

== Legacy ==
There are many popular plays and films that McCormick was part of which are still remembered to this day by many, some of them include the original The Plough and the Stars in (1926) where he originated the role of Commandant Jack Clitheroe. He also played the role of Captain Brennan in the John Ford film version of the play in 1936. In his appreciation for McCormick, Gabriel Fallon remembered him as both a great actor and a great man.

It is said that he was one of the most versatile actors of his generation, his early death was a huge loss to the Irish arts and more specifically the Abbey Theatre where he carried most of his work.

== Filmography ==
| Year | Title | Role | Notes |
|---|---|---|---|
| 1936 | The Plough and the Stars | Brennan | |
| 1947 | Hungry Hill | Old Tim | |
| 1947 | Odd Man Out | Shell | (final film role) |
