= Odd Man Out (novel) =

1945 novel

- Author: F. L. Green
- Language: English
- Genre: Crime thriller
- Publisher: Michael Joseph
- Publication date: 1945
- Publication place: United Kingdom
- Media type: Print

Odd Man Out is a 1945 crime thriller novel by the British writer F. L. Green. The novel is set in present-day Northern Ireland and portrays an IRA heist gone wrong.

== Film adaptation ==
In 1947, it was made into the British film of the same title directed by Carol Reed and starring James Mason, Kathleen Ryan, and Robert Newton. In 1969, it was loosely remade as The Lost Man an American film starring Sidney Poitier.

== Bibliography ==
- Goble, Alan. The Complete Index to Literary Sources in Film. Walter de Gruyter, 1999. ISBN 978-1-85739-229-6.
- Moore, Matthew Dwight. Watching Cosmic Time: The Suspense Films of Hitchcock, Welles, and Reed. Wipf and Stock Publishers, 26 Oct 2022. ISBN 978-1-6667-3262-7.
- Steel, Jayne. Demons, Hamlets and Femmes Fatales: Representations of Irish Republicanism in Popular Fiction. Peter Lang, 2007. ISBN 978-3-03911-007-0.
