= Eileen Crowe =

Irish actress

- Born: Alice Izabella Crowe; 2 March 1899; Drumcondra, Dublin, Ireland
- Died: 8 May 1978 (aged 79); Dublin
- Occupation: Actor
- Years active: 49 year
- Spouse: F. J. McCormick

Eileen Crowe (2 March 1899 – 8 May 1978) was an Irish actress. She was born in Dublin, Ireland. Eileen was married to Peter Judge, an actor whose stage name was F. J. McCormick.

== Career ==
Eileen had a career with the Abbey Theatre from 1921 to 1970.

She appeared in many films from 1936–1964 including The Plough and the Stars (1936), The Quiet Man (1952), Home is the Hero (1959) and Girl with Green Eyes (1964).

Between 1931–1953 she appeared in the Abbey Theatre productions of plays by Irish playwright Teresa Deevy including A Disciple (1931), Katie Roche (1936), (1937), (1949), (1953), Temporal Powers (1932), (1937) and The Reapers (1930).

== Early life ==
Born Alice Izabella at Carlingford Terrace in Drumcondra, Crowe was one of ten children born to grocer Moses Crowe and Therese Eglinton.

== Later life and death ==
Upon her entry to the Abbey School of Acting, Crowe made her debut in 1921 in the play The revolutionist, taking the lead role of Nora Mangan. Crowe played her last role of Miss Hatty in 'Grogan and the ferret', after which she retired. During these near five decades, she starred in many plays, including The marriage of Columbine (1921) and Juno and the Paycock (1924) in which she took the part of Mary Boyle. Even more, following her film debut in 1925 in The Land of her Fathers, Crowe made her last film appearance in Girl with Green Eyes, which debuted in 1964. That same year she appeared in the Aldwych Theatre's production of Juno and the Paycock in London. She worked in the Abbey for the vast majority of her career, except for when she was on a six month tour for Peg O' My Heart, touring Northern Ireland and England.

In 1924, when the play Grasshopper was being produced, Crowe met her husband Peter Judge, also known as F.J. McCormick. They got married in 1925, and later on they had a daughter and a son.

Crowe passed away on the 8 May 1978, and was buried in the Deansgrange Cemetery in Blackrock, County Dublin, Ireland, with her husband.

== Legacy ==
Eileen Crowe died on 8 May 1978 aged 79 and was buried in Dublin, Ireland.

After a 49 year long career with the Abbey Theater performing alongside her husband F.J. McCormick, she is now remembered as a devoted artist and a devoted wife. The couple had two children, a son and a daughter.

== Playography ==
- A Disciple 1931
- Katie Roche 1936, 1937, 1949, 1953
- Temporal Powers 1932, 1937
- The Reapers 1930

== Filmography ==
Year	Title	Role	Notes
1936	The Plough and the Stars	Bessie Burgess	
1947	Hungry Hill	Bridget	
1949	Top o' the Morning	Biddy O'Devlin	
1951	The Promise of Barty O'Brien	Mrs. O'Brien	
1952	Steel Town	Millie McNamara	
1952	The Quiet Man	Mrs. Elizabeth Playfair	
1957	The Rising of the Moon	Mrs. O'Hara - Police Sergeant's Wife	(3rd Episode)
1959	Home is the Hero	Daylia O'Reilly	
1959	Shake Hands with the Devil	Mrs. Madigan	
1960	A Terrible Beauty	Mrs. Kathleen O'Neill	
1960	Boyd's Shop	Miss McClure	
1964	Girl with Green Eyes	Mrs. Byrne	(final film role)
