= Denis O'Dea =

Irish actor (1905–1978)

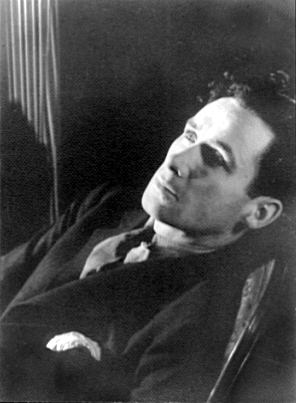
- Denis O'Dea in 1933. Photo by Carl Van Vechten
- Born: 26 April 1905; Dublin, Ireland
- Died: 5 November 1978 (aged 73); Dublin, Republic of Ireland
- Years active: 1935–1960
- Spouse: Siobhán McKenna (m. 1946)
- Children: 1

Denis O'Dea (26 April 1905 – 5 November 1978) was an Irish stage and film actor.

== Career ==
He was born in Dublin and attended Synge Street CBS. When very young he and his mother Kathleen (from County Kerry) moved in with her sister, who kept a boarding house at 54 South Richmond Street. He worked in insurance until taking up acting. O'Dea was a leading member of Dublin's Abbey Theatre where he had a great acting career from 1929 to 1953; a list of his performances can be found in the Abbey archives. He also appeared in numerous plays by Irish playwright Teresa Deevy, some of which toured New York and England. His work led to a number of notable film roles, including two mid-1930s John Ford films, The Informer and The Plough and the Stars (1936), and the part of the police inspector in pursuit of IRA man James Mason in Carol Reed's Odd Man Out (1947).

Other films in which he appeared include The Mark of Cain (1947), The Fallen Idol (1948, again for Reed, and again as a police inspector), Alfred Hitchcock's Under Capricorn (1949), The Bad Lord Byron (1949), Landfall (1949), Marry Me! (1949), Disney's Treasure Island (1950), Captain Horatio Hornblower (1951), The Long Dark Hall (1951), Mogambo (1953; another John Ford film), Niagara (1953), Never Take No for an Answer (1953), The Rising of the Moon (1957), Captain Lightfoot (1957), Darby O'Gill and the Little People (1959), and Esther and the King (1960).

== Family ==
He was married to actress Siobhán McKenna from 1946 until his death in 1978 at the age of 73; they had one son, Donnacha O'Dea, who is a champion swimmer and professional poker player.

== Filmography ==
- Guests of the Nation (1935)
- The Informer (1935) – Street Singer
- Beloved Enemy (1936) – Sean's I.R.A. Friend (uncredited)
- The Plough and the Stars (1936) – The Covey
- Odd Man Out (1947) – Inspector
- The Mark of Cain (1947) – Sir William Godgrey
- The Fallen Idol (1948) – Inspector Crowe
- The Bad Lord Byron (1949) – Prosecuting Counsel
- Marry Me! (1949) – Saunders
- Under Capricorn (1949) – Mr. Corrigan
- Landfall (1949) – Capt. Burnaby
- Treasure Island (1950) – Dr. Livesey
- The Long Dark Hall (1951) – Sir Charles Morton
- Captain Horatio Hornblower (1951) – RAdm. Sir Rodney Leighton
- Peppino e Violetta (1951) – Father Damico
- Never Take No for an Answer (1951) – Father Damico
- Niagara (1953) – Inspector Starkey
- Sea Devils (1953) – Lethierry
- Mogambo (1953) – Father Josef
- Captain Lightfoot (1955) – Regis Donnell
- The Rising of the Moon (1957) – Police Sergeant Tom O'Hara (3rd Episode)
- The Story of Esther Costello (1957) – Father Devlin
- Darby O'Gill and the Little People (1959) – Father Murphy
- Esther and the King (1960) – Mordecai (final film role)

== Theater credits ==
Year	Title	Role	Director	Venue/Notes
1929	The Woman			Abbey Theatre, a play by Margaret O'Leary
1930	The Reapers	Ted Doherty	Lennox Robinson	Abbey Theatre, lost work of Teresa Deevy
1931	A Disciple	Jack the Scalp		Abbey Theatre, Dublin, a play by Teresa Deevy
1931	The Moon in the Yellow River	Darrell Blake		Abbey Theatre, Dublin, a play by Denis Johnston
1932	Temporal Powers	Jim Slattery		Abbey Theatre, Dublin, a play by Teresa Deevy
1932	Things That Are Caesar's	Terrence Nooman		Martin Beck Theatre, New York, O'Dea's American debut
1932	The New Gossoon	Luke Carey		Martin Beck Theatre, New York
1933	Margaret Gillan	Michael Taafe		Abbey Theatre, Dublin, a play by Brinsley MacNamara
1934	The Plough and the Stars	Capt. Brennan		John Golden Theatre, New York, part of a reparatory performance in November of that year.
1934	The New Gossoon	Luke Carey		John Golden Theatre, New York, part of a reparatory performance in November of that year.
1934	Drama at Inish	Eddie Twohig		John Golden Theatre, New York, part of a reparatory performance in November of that year.
1934	Look at the Heffernans	Sidney Heffernan		John Golden Theatre, New York, part of a reparatory performance in November of that year.
1934	The Resurrection	The Syrian		John Golden Theatre, New York, part of a reparatory performance in November of that year.
1934	Church Street	The Evoked Hugh		John Golden Theatre, New York, part of a reparatory performance in November of that year.
1934	The Well of the Saints	Mat Simon		John Golden Theatre, New York, part of a reparatory performance in November of that year.
1934	The Coiner	A Police Sergeant		John Golden Theatre, New York, part of a reparatory performance in November of that year.
1934	Juno and the Paycock	An Irregular Mobilizer		John Golden Theatre, New York, part of a reparatory performance in November of that year.
1936	The Puritan	Francis Ferriter	Chester Erskin	Belmont Theatre, New York
1936	Green Waters	Michael Fraser		Theatre Masque, New York
1937	Katie Roche	Jo Mahoney		Cambridge, England
1937	Katie Roche	Jo Mahoney		Ambassador Theatre, New York
1937	The Plough and the Stars	The Young Covey		Ambassador Theatre, New York
1937	In a Train	Delancey		Ambassador Theatre, New York
1937	The Playboy of the Western World	Philly Cullen		Ambassador Theatre, New York
1937	The New Gossoon	Luke Carey		Ambassador Theatre, New York
1937	Juno and the Paycock	Jerry Devine		Ambassador Theatre, New York
1937	Drama at Inish	John Hegarty		Ambassador Theatre, New York
1938	Riders to the Sea	Bartley		Touring production
1938	The King of Spain's Daughter	Jim Harris		Abbey Theatre, Dublin
1939	The King of Spain's Daughter	Jim Harris		Cork, Ireland
1941	The Money Doesn't Matter	Philip Mannion		Abbey Theatre, Dublin
1942	Juno and the Paycock	Joxer Daly		
1942	The Plough and the Stars	Commandant Jack Clitheroe		
1944	John Bull's Other Island			Abbey Theatre, Dublin
1945	Juno and the Paycock	Jerry Devine	Lennox Robinson	Abbey Theatre, Dublin
1945	The Playboy of the Western World	Shawn Keogh		Abbey Theatre, Dublin
1946	The Shadow of a Gunman	Donal Davoren		Abbey Theatre, Dublin
1951	The Playboy of the Western World	Shawn Keogh		The Dublin Players, Edinburgh Festival
1953	The Playboy of the Western World	Shawn Keogh		Gaiety Theatre, Dublin
1953	Shadow and Substance	Rev. Thomas Canon Skerritt		Abbey Theatre, Dublin
1955	The Righteous Are Bold	Father O'Malley	Eddie Dowling	Holiday Theatre, New York
