= Guido Celano =

Italian actor (1904–1988)

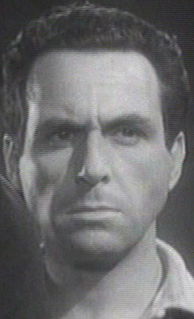
- Celano in the movie Four Steps in the Clouds (1942)
- Born: 19 April 1904; Francavilla al Mare, Kingdom of Italy
- Died: 7 March 1988 (aged 83); Rome, Italy
- Occupations: Actor; voice actor; film director
- Years active: 1929–1988

Guido Celano (19 April 1904 – 7 March 1988) was an Italian actor, voice actor and film director. He appeared in 120 films between 1931 and 1988. He also directed two spaghetti Westerns: Cold Killer and Gun Shy Piluk.

== Selected filmography ==
- Rotaie (1929, directed by Mario Camerini)
- The Charmer (1931, directed by Guido Brignone) - Un cliente del night club
- The Devil's Lantern (1931)
- La scala (1931, directed by Gennaro Righelli) – Il pianisto
- Palio (1932, directed by Alessandro Blasetti) – Zarre
- The Blue Fleet (1932, directed by Gennaro Righelli) – Castelli
- Acqua cheta (1933) – Cecco
- My Little One (1933) – Paolo Vallini – il corridore automobilista
- La serva padrona (1934)
- Music in the Square (1936, directed by Mario Mattoli)
- Squadrone bianco (1936, directed by Augusto Genina) – Il tenente Fabrizi
- Amore (1936) – Marco Albert
- Doctor Antonio (1937) – Domenico Morelli
- Pietro Micca (1938) – Pietro Micca
- The Black Corsair (1938, directed by Amleto Palermi) - Morgan - Korsar
- Giuseppe Verdi (1938) - Francesco Maria Piave
- Jeanne Doré (1938, directed by Mario Bonnard) - Avvocato Charles
- Le sorprese del divorzio (1939, directed by Guido Brignone) - Giovanni, il cameriere di Duval
- Ultima giovinezza (1939) - Reynaud
- Follie del secolo (1939) - Il delegato di Pubblica Sicurezza
- The Silent Partner (1939)
- Arditi civili (1940, directed by Domenico Gammino) - Il giovane vigile
- Fanfulla da Lodi (1940) - Il duca di Termoli
- The Cavalier from Kruja (1940, directed by Carlo Campogalliani) - Hasslan Haidar
- First Love (1941)
- Fedora (1942, directed by Camillo Mastrocinque)
- Don Cesare di Bazan (1942, directed by Riccardo Freda) - Il capitano del "Flavio Gioia"
- The Two Orphans (1942) - Monsieur Gérard
- La fabbrica dell'imprevisto (1942) - Il soggettista
- Sleeping Beauty (1942, directed by Luigi Chiarini) - Lo solfataro
- Fedora (1942) - Cirillo
- Four Steps in the Clouds (1942, directed by Alessandro Blasetti) - Pasquale - Fratello di Maria
- Knights of the Desert (1942)
- A Living Statue (1943) - L'amante di Rita
- Enrico IV (1943) - Barberis
- La maschera e il volto (1943) - Marco
- L'affaire du Grand Hôtel (1946)
- Il fabbro del convento (1947) - Boris
- Fatal Symphony (1947) - Giorgio
- Legge di sangue (1948) - Saverio
- Fabiola (1949) - Pompey
- Flying Squadron (1949)
- Deported (1950) - Aldo Brescia
- Pact with the Devil (1950) - Il sottuficiale dei carabinieri
- Women and Brigands (1950) - Sergente borbone
- Il Brigante Musolino (1950) - Brigadier Rinaldi
- The Thief of Venice (1950, directed by John Brahm) - Polo
- L' Amore di Norma (1951) - D'Emilis
- Without a Flag (1951) - Sottocapo Poggi
- Seven Hours of Trouble (1951, directed by Marcello Marchesi) - Achille
- The Seven Dwarfs to the Rescue (1951)
- Peppino e Violetta (1951) - Strotti
- Never Take No for an Answer (1951) - Strotti
- Viva il cinema! (1952)
- Femmina senza cuore (1952) - Vittorio Lombardo
- Times Gone By (1952) - Il tenente medico (segment "Il tamburino sardo")
- Black Feathers (1952, directed by Oreste Biancoli) - Olinto Cossutti
- Red Love (1952) - Bantine Fera
- Jolanda, the Daughter of the Black Corsair (1953) - Morgan, il pirata
- Legione straniera (1953) - Capitano Della Nave
- The Man from Cairo (1953) - Emile Touchard
- Ivan, Son of the White Devil (1953)
- Verdi, the King of Melody (1953) - Victor Hugo (uncredited)
- La prigioniera di Amalfi (1954)
- The Stranger's Hand (1954, directed by Mario Soldati) - Chief Constable
- A Slice of Life (1954) - Regista (segment "Scena all'aperto)
- Ho pianto per te! (1954) - Pagliaccio Toni
- Loves of Three Queens (1954) - Giove (segment: The Face That Launched a Thousand Ships)
- A Invasão dos Bárbaros (1954) - Capo della tribu / Tribe Chieftain
- The Boatman of Amalfi (1954) - Antonio Selva
- The River Girl (1954)
- I cinque dell'Adamello (1954) - Don Romualdo
- Non c'è amore più grande (1955)
- Il padrone sono me (1955, directed by Franco Brusati) - Maresciallo dei carabinieri
- Don Camillo's Last Round (1955, directed by Carmine Gallone) - Il maresciallo
- L'ultimo amante (1955, directed by Mario Mattoli)
- Seu Último Amante (1955) - Medico di guardia
- Girls of Today (1955)
- Storia di una minorenne (1956)
- War and Peace (1956) - Victor (uncredited)
- The Lebanese Mission (1956) - M. Hennequin
- The Wolves (1956, directed by Giuseppe De Santis) - Don Pietro
- Io, Caterina (1957) - Jacopo Benincasa
- Dreams in a Drawer (1957) - The Hospital Doctor
- La diga sul Pacifico (Orig.: This Angry Age) (1958, directed by René Clément) - Bart
- Seven Hills of Rome (1957) - Luigi
- Amarti è il mio destino (1957) - Franco Albonetti
- Mattino di primavera (1957) - Benzinaio
- Orizzonte infuocato (1957) - Padre di Manuela
- Young Husbands (1958) - Padre di Franco
- Fortunella (1958) - Concierge
- Il Conte di Matera (1958) - The Innkeeper Giacomo (uncredited)
- Valeria ragazza poco seria (1958)
- The Beautiful Legs of Sabrina (1958) - Tavernet
- Tempest (1958) - Contadino dell'isba
- Anche l'inferno trema (1958)
- Dubrowsky (1959) - Gerichtsvorsitzender
- The Indian Tomb (1959) - Gen. Dagh (uncredited)
- L'isola del tesoro (1959, TV Mini-Series, directed by Anton Giulio Majano) - Morgan
- Il padrone delle ferriere (1959, directed by Anton Giulio Majano) - Gobert
- The Great War (1959) - Italian major
- The Tiger of Eschnapur (1959, directed by Fritz Lang)
- Carthage in Flames (1960)
- Il bell'Antonio (1960, directed by Mauro Bolognini) - Calderana
- Five Branded Women (1960) - Drago
- Under Ten Flags (1960) - (uncredited)
- Il gobbo (1960, directed by Carlo Lizzani)
- La Donna dei Faraoni (AKA: The Pharaoh's Woman) (1960)
- Il carabiniere a cavallo (1961, directed by Carlo Lizzani) - Padre di Rita
- Goliath and the Vampires (1961) - Kobrak, the Vampire
- Sword of the Conqueror (1961) - Delfo
- Black City (1961) - Brigadiere
- The Italian Brigands (1961) - Muso
- Barabbas (1961, directed by Richard Fleischer) - Scorpio
- Hypnosis (1962) - Tony
- L'Immortelle (1963, directed by Alain Robbe-Grillet) - M, the Stranger
- Duel at the Rio Grande (1963)
- The Invincible Masked Rider (1963) - Dottor Aguilera
- Il disco volante (1964) - fratellastro di Vittoria
- The Hills Run Red (1966) - Jonathan Burger, Ferrier
- The Blonde from Peking (1967) - De Lucca
- The Cold Killer (1967) - Sheriff
- Giurò... e li uccise ad uno ad uno... Piluk il timido (1968) - Sam Wyler (uncredited)
- The Sicilian Checkmate (1972)
- Boccaccio (1972) - Anselmo
- Flavia the Heretic (1974, directed by Gianfranco Mingozzi) - Man who prepares the decoction
- Lo sgarbo (1975, directed by Marino Girolami) - Don Mimì
- Mark Shoots First (1975) - Mario Borelli
- Cross Shot (1976) - Blasi's Father
- L'educatore autorizzato (1980) - Mancuso
- Sciopèn (1982, directed by Luciano Odorisio) - zio Cesarino
- I due carabinieri (1984, directed by Carlo Verdone) - Uncle Renato
- Via Paradiso (1988, directed by Luciano Odorisio) - Andrea, nonno di Francesco (final film role)
