= Peppino e Violetta =

Never Take No for an Answer Peppino e Violetta
- Directed by: Maurice Cloche
- Written by: Maurice Cloche, Diego Fabbri
- Music by: Nino Rota
- Release date: 1950
- Country: Italy
- Language: Italian

Never Take No for an Answer (also known as Peppino e Violetta and The Small Miracle) is a 1950 Italian film directed by Maurice Cloche.

== Cast ==
- Roberto Adamina as Gianni
- Nerio Bernardi as Father Superior
- Guido Celano as Strotti
- Frank Coulson as Doctor Bartolo
- Arnoldo Foà
- Vittorio Manunta as Peppino
- John Murphy as Father O'Brien
- Denis O'Dea as Father Damico

== See also ==
- Never Take No for an Answer (1951)
