= Goodyear Television Playhouse =

- Also known as: Goodyear Playhouse
- Genre: Anthology
- Directed by: Sidney Lumet; Delbert Mann; Vincent J. Donehue; Robert Mulligan; Arthur Penn; Daniel Petrie; Jack Smight
- Country of origin: United States
- Original language: English
- No. of seasons: 6
- No. of episodes: 143

Production
- Producers: Robert Alan Aurthur; Fred Coe; Gordon Duff; David Susskind
- Camera setup: Multi-camera
- Running time: 48–50 minutes
- Production company: Showcase Productions

Original release
- Network: NBC
- Release: October 14, 1951 – September 29, 1957

Related
- The Philco Television Playhouse; The Alcoa Hour

Goodyear Television Playhouse is an American anthology series that was telecast live on NBC from 1951 to 1957 during the first Golden Age of Television.

Goodyear alternated sponsorship with Philco, and The Philco Television Playhouse was seen on alternate weeks. In October 1955, Alcoa took over alternating sponsorship from Philco, the title was shortened to The Goodyear Playhouse and it aired on alternate weeks with The Alcoa Hour.

Producer Fred Coe nurtured and encouraged a group of young, mostly unknown writers that included Robert Alan Aurthur, George Baxt, Paddy Chayefsky, Horton Foote, Howard Richardson, Tad Mosel and Gore Vidal. Notable productions included Vidal's Visit to a Small Planet (1955), Richardson's Ark of Safety and Chayefsky's The Catered Affair.

From 1957 to 1960, it became a taped, half-hour series titled Goodyear Theater, seen on Mondays at 9:30 p.m.

Goodyear Television Playhouse finished #16 in the Nielsen ratings for the 1951–1952 season, #15 for 1952–1953 and #22 for 1953–1954.

== Episodes ==
=== Season 1 (1951–52) ===
No. overall	No. in season	Title	Original release date
1	1	"October Story"	October 14, 1951
A chance human interest interview reveals a girl has created a television that would only cost a few dollars. NBC executives become interested and hire a young man to help the girl complete her plans at her home.
2	2	"The Copper"	October 28, 1951
A wimpy, accident prone little man aspires to marry a tough police sergeant's daughter, and becomes a rookie cop. He's given an undercover assignment, posing as a convict in a prison to learn more about his inmates.
3	3	"Flight to Freedom"	November 11, 1951
4	4	"The Eleventh Ward"	November 25, 1951
5	5	"Money to Burn"	December 9, 1951
6	6	"I Was Stalin's Prisoner"	December 23, 1951
7	7	"A Softness in the Wind"	January 6, 1952
8	8	"Raymond Schindler, Case One"	January 20, 1952
9	9	"Tour of Duty"	February 3, 1952
10	10	"Crown of Shadows"	February 17, 1952
11	11	"Treasure Chest"	March 2, 1952
12	12	"Three Letters"	March 16, 1952
13	13	"Tigers Don't Sing"	March 30, 1952
14	14	"The Madea Cup"	April 13, 1952
15	15	"The Travellers"	April 27, 1952
16	16	"The Twenty-Third Mission"	May 11, 1952
17	17	"The Lantern Copy"	May 25, 1952
18	18	"Four Meetings"	June 8, 1952
19	19	"It's a Small World"	June 22, 1952
20	20	"Leaf Out of a Book"	July 6, 1952
21	21	"The Trial of Steve Kent"	July 20, 1952
22	22	"The Duty Drawer"	August 3, 1952
23	23	"The Witness"	August 17, 1952
24	24	"Roman Fever"	August 31, 1952

=== Season 2 (1952–53) ===
No. overall	No. in season	Title	Original release date
25	1	"Holiday Song"	September 14, 1952
26	2	"The Room"	September 28, 1952
27	3	"O Romany"	October 12, 1952
28	4	"Better Than Walking"	October 26, 1952
29	5	"The Darkness Below"	November 9, 1952
30	6	"The Old Beginning"	November 23, 1952
31	7	"The Search"	December 7, 1952
31	8	"Mr. Quimby's Christmas Hats"	December 21, 1952
32	9	"A Medal in the Family"	February 1, 1953
33	10	"Wings On My Feet"	February 22, 1953
34	11	"The Rumor"	March 8, 1953
35	12	"The Gesture"	March 15, 1953
36	13	"Wish on the Moon"	March 29, 1953
37	14	"The Long Way Home"	April 19, 1953
38	15	"Printer's Measure"	April 26, 1953
39	16	"The Accident"	May 3, 1953
40	17	"The Oil Well"	May 17, 1953
41	18	"Before I Wake"	May 31, 1953
42	19	"Her Prince Charming"	June 14, 1953
43	20	"Catch a Falling Star"	June 28, 1953
44	21	"Nothing to Sneeze At"	July 12, 1953
45	22	"The Young and the Fair"	July 26, 1953
46	23	"Ernie Barger Is Fifty"	August 9, 1953
47	24	"Hollywood Tandem"	August 23, 1953

=== Season 3 (1953–54) ===
No. overall	No. in season	Title	Original release date
48	1	"Other People's Houses"	August 30, 1953
49	2	"The Happy Rest"	October 4, 1953
50	3	"The Heaven"	November 1, 1953
51	4	"John Turner"	November 15, 1953
52	5	"Madame Aphrodite"	December 6, 1953
53	6	"Wings Over Barriers"	December 20, 1953
54	7	"Moment of Panic"	January 3, 1954
55	8	"Here's Father"	January 17, 1954
56	9	"Brownstone"	January 31, 1954
57	10	"The Game of Hide and Seek"	February 7, 1954
58	11	"The Huntress"	February 14, 1954
59	12	"Buy Me Blue Ribbons"	February 28, 1954
60	13	"The Inward Eye"	March 14, 1954
61	14	"Native Dancer"	March 28, 1954
62	15	"Spring Reunion"	April 11, 1954
63	16	"Old Tasselfoot"	April 25, 1954
64	17	"And Crown Thy Good"	May 16, 1954
65	18	"The Lawn Party"	May 23, 1954
66	19	"Write Me Out Forever"	June 20, 1954
67	20	"Suitable for Farming"	July 4, 1954
68	21	"Dear Harriet Heart-Throb"	July 18, 1954
69	22	"The Arena"	August 1, 1954
70	23	"Recoil"	August 15, 1954
71	24	"Star in the Summer Night"	August 22, 1954
72	25	"The Power of Suggestion"	August 29, 1954
73	26	"The Big Man on Campus"	September 12, 1954

=== Season 4 (1954–55) ===
No. overall	No. in season	Title	Original release date
74	1	"Guilty is the Stranger"	September 26, 1954
75	2	"The Personal Touch"	October 10, 1954
76	3	"Flight Report"	November 7, 1954
77	4	"Thunder of Silence"	November 21, 1954
78	5	"Last Boat from Messina"	December 5, 1954
79	6	"Class of '58"	December 19, 1954
80	7	"A Case of Pure Fiction"	January 2, 1955
81	8	"Doing Her Bit"	January 16, 1955
82	9	"The Way Things Happen"	January 30, 1955
83	10	"The Rabbit Trap"	February 13, 1955
84	11	"Backfire"	February 27, 1955
85	12	"My Lost Saints"	March 13, 1955
86	13	"The Chivington Raid"	March 27, 1955
87	14	"Beloved Stranger"	April 10, 1955
88	15	"Do it Yourself"	April 24, 1955
89	16	"Visit to a Small Planet"	May 8, 1955
90	17	"The Catered Affair"	May 22, 1955
91	18	"Mr. Dorothy Allen"	June 5, 1955
92	19	"End of the Mission"	June 19, 1955
93	20	"Tangled Web"	July 3, 1955
94	21	"Man on Spikes"	July 17, 1955
95	22	"The Prize Winner"	July 31, 1955
96	23	"The Takers"	August 14, 1955

=== Season 5 (1955–56) ===
No. overall	No. in season	Title	Original release date
97	1	"Suit Yourself"	September 11, 1955
98	2	"The Merry-Go-Round"	September 25, 1955
99	3	"The Expendable House"	October 9, 1955
100	4	"A Patch of Faith"	TBD
101	5	"The Mechanical Heart"	November 6, 1955
102	6	"One Mummy to Many"	November 20, 1955
103	7	"The Trees"	December 4, 1955
104	8	"TBD"	TBD
105	9	"Rise Up and Walk"	January 1, 1956
106	10	"This Land is Mine"	January 15, 1956
107	11	"Starlet"	January 29, 1956
108	12	"Kyria Katina"	February 12, 1956
109	13	"The Terrorists"	February 26, 1956
110	14	"Conspiracy of Hearts"	March 11, 1956
111	15	"Joey"	March 25, 1956
112	16	"Footlight Frenzy"	April 8, 1956
113	17	"Career Girl"	April 22, 1956
114	18	"The Sentry"	May 6, 1956
115	19	"In the Days of Our Youth"	May 20, 1956
116	20	"The Primary Colors"	June 3, 1956
117	21	"The Pipes of Pan"	June 17, 1956
118	22	"The Film Maker"	July 1, 1956
119	23	"Country Fair Time"	July 15, 1956
120	24	"Pencil Sketch"	July 29, 1956
121	25	"Proud Passage"	August 12, 1956
122	26	"Grow Up"	August 26, 1956
123	27	"Ark of Safety"	September 9, 1956

== Notable guest stars ==
- Philip Abbott
- Eddie Albert
- Don Ameche
- Jean-Pierre Aumont
- Ed Begley
- Ralph Bellamy
- William Bendix
- Shelley Berman
- Theodore Bikel
- Claire Bloom
- Beulah Bondi
- Ernest Borgnine
- Eddie Bracken
- Lloyd Bridges
- Pat Carroll (actress)
- John Cassavetes
- Lee J. Cobb
- Hume Cronyn
- Don DeFore
- Melvyn Douglas
- Mildred Dunnock
- Bill Erwin
- Gracie Fields
- Geraldine Fitzgerald
- John Forsythe
- Anthony Franciosa
- Eva Gabor
- Larry Hagman
- Margaret Hamilton
- Julie Harris
- Eileen Heckart
- Judy Holliday
- Celeste Holm
- Grace Kelly
- Phyllis Kirk
- Jack Klugman
- Veronica Lake
- Viveca Lindfors
- June Lockhart
- Jack Lord
- Kathleen Maguire
- E. G. Marshall
- Nan Martin
- Raymond Massey
- Walter Matthau
- Roddy McDowell
- Steve McQueen
- Sal Mineo
- Mildred Natwick
- Patricia Neal
- Paul Newman
- Leslie Nielsen
- Anthony Perkins
- Robert Preston (actor)
- Tony Randall
- Thelma Ritter
- Jason Robards
- Gena Rowlands
- Eva Marie Saint
- Martha Scott
- William Shatner
- Lilia Skala
- Kim Stanley
- Maureen Stapleton
- Rod Steiger
- Susan Strasberg
- Elaine Stritch
- Jessica Tandy
- Eli Wallach
- Tuesday Weld
- Joanne Woodward
- Dick York

== Production ==
Goodyear Television Playhouse was a production of Showcase Productions, Incorporated. Herbert Brodkin was the producer. During his 12-week vacation in 1956, associate producer Philip Barry Jr. produced the series. Other producers included Gordon Duff. Directors included Arthur Penn.

== Critical response ==
A review in The New York Times praised Heckart's performance in "My Lost Saints" (1955), saying, "Miss Heckart's brilliant work overshadowed the deficiencies in script construction." The review said that the episode might not have exceeded soap-opera status had it not been for Heckart's acting, but she created "a moving and entirely believable characterization" of a housekeeper who faced a crisis. It concluded, "She raised what was basically an ordinary drama to a level of distinction."
