= Mist on the Waters =

1948 novel

- Author: F. L. Green
- Language: English
- Genre: Thriller
- Publisher: Michael Joseph
- Publication date: 1948
- Publication place: United Kingdom
- Media type: Print

Mist on the Waters is a 1948 thriller novel by the British writer F.L. Green. In an Irish city two men become involved in blackmail and soon begin to feel the effects of this underhand business.

== Adaptations ==
It was adapted twice for television: first in 1949 for The Philco Television Playhouse starring Torin Thatcher and again in 1956 for an episode of General Motors Presents featuring Katherine Blake and Barry Morse.

== Bibliography ==
- Hawes, William Live Television Drama, 1946–1951. McFarland, 2015.
- Hubin, Allen J. Crime Fiction, 1749–1980: A Comprehensive Bibliography. Garland Publishing, 1984.
- Willison, I.R. (ed.) The New Cambridge Bibliography of English Literature: Volume 4, 1900–1950. Cambridge University Press, 1972.
