= Edge of the City =

1957 film by Martin Ritt

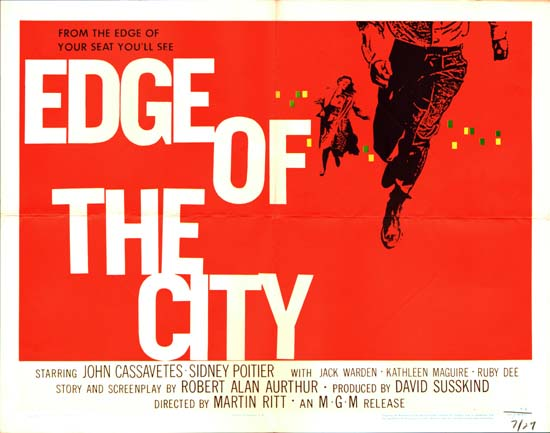
- Theatrical release poster by Saul Bass
- Directed by: Martin Ritt
- Screenplay by: Robert Alan Aurthur
- Based on: "A Man Is Ten Feet Tall" by Robert Alan Aurthur
- Produced by: Jim Di Gangi; David Susskind
- Starring: John Cassavetes; Sidney Poitier; Jack Warden; Kathleen Maguire; Ruby Dee
- Cinematography: Joseph Brun
- Edited by: Sidney Meyers
- Music by: Leonard Rosenman
- Production companies: David Susskind Productions; Jonathan Productions
- Distributed by: Metro-Goldwyn-Mayer
- Release date: January 29, 1957
- Running time: 85 minutes
- Country: United States
- Language: English
- Budget: $493,000
- Box office: $760,000

Edge of the City is a 1957 American crime drama film directed by Martin Ritt in his feature directorial debut, starring John Cassavetes and Sidney Poitier. The screenplay by Robert Alan Aurthur is based on his teleplay "A Man Is Ten Feet Tall", aired as a 1955 episode of the anthology series The Philco Television Playhouse, which also starred Poitier.

The film was considered unusual for its time because of its portrayal of an interracial friendship. It was praised by representatives of the NAACP, Urban League, American Jewish Committee and Interfaith Council for its portrayal of racial brotherhood. In 2023, the film was selected for preservation in the United States National Film Registry by the Library of Congress as being "culturally, historically or aesthetically significant."

== Plot ==
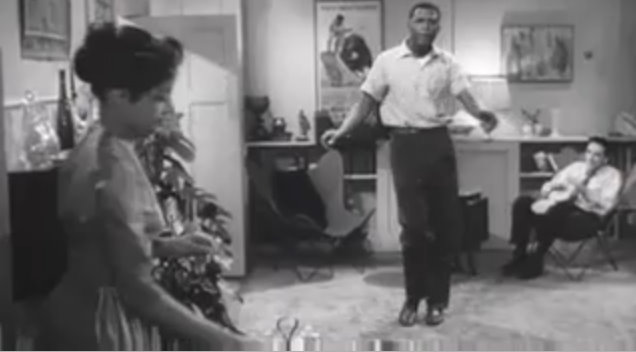
Ruby Dee, Sidney Poitier and John Cassavetes

Young, insecure drifter Axel Nordmann arrives at the waterfront on the west side of Manhattan, seeking employment as a longshoreman, and giving his name as "Axel North." He goes to work in a gang of stevedores headed by Charlie Malick, a vicious bully, and is befriended by his Black coworker Tommy Tyler, who also supervises a stevedore gang and has an engaging, charming sense of humor. Malick resents Black people and is antagonized when Axel goes to work for Tommy.

Axel moves into Tommy's neighborhood, becomes friends with Tommy's wife Lucy and develops a romantic relationship with her friend Ellen Wilson. Tommy serves as a mentor to Axel, urging him to stand up to Malick, and says that if he does, he will be "ten feet tall". It is apparent from the start that Axel is hiding something. It emerges that he is a deserter from the United States Army; Malick is aware of this, and is extorting money from him.

Malick frequently tries to provoke Tommy and Axel into fights, with Tommy coming to Axel's aid. Malick finally provokes Tommy into a fight, with both men using their baling hooks. At one point, Tommy disarms Malick and implores him to stop, but Malick seizes the hook and kills him. The police investigation is stymied by lack of cooperation from the longshoremen, including Axel.

But after meeting with the distraught Lucy, who accuses him of never being Tommy's friend, as he knows who killed Tommy but has not told the police, Axel finally decides to cooperate. He goes to Malick to tell him that. They get into a fight. In the end, though beaten, Axel strangles Malick unconscious and drags him away to face justice.

== Cast ==
Credits from the AFI Catalog of Feature Films:

- John Cassavetes as Axel "North" Nordmann
- Sidney Poitier as Tommy Tyler
- Jack Warden as Charlie Malick
- Kathleen Maguire as Ellen Wilson
- Ruby Dee as Lucy Tyler
- Val Avery as Brother
- Robert Simon as George Nordmann
- Ruth White as Katherine Nordmann
- William A. Lee as Davis
- John Kellogg as Detective
- David Clarke as Wallace
- Estelle Hemsley as Mrs. Price

== Production ==
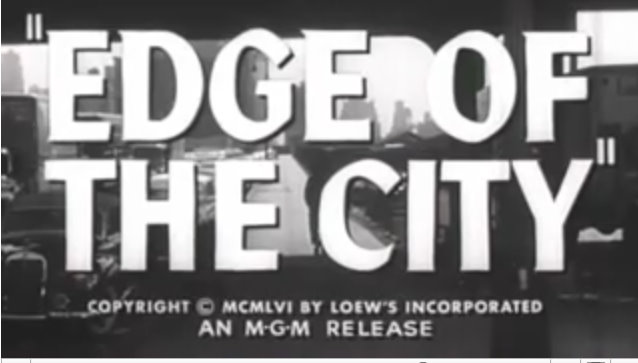
Title Card

The movie was based on the teleplay "A Man Is Ten Feet Tall". It was optioned by Jonathan Productions, an offshoot of Talent Associates formed by David Susskin, Robert Alan Aurthur and Al Levy. MGM agreed to finance. Martin Ritt had previously directed Aurthur's teleplay "A Very Special Baby" for The Play of the Week, and the author insisted he direct. Aurthur completely rewrote his script for the film, expanding its narrative considerably.

The budget was set at $475,000 and 32 were allocated for filming entirely in New York, 18 in studio and 14 on location, plus two weeks rehearsal. Jonathan was entitled to 25% of the profits and filming started April 1956. It was decided to change the title after market research.

Poitier was the only actor remaining from the TV version, in which the Jack Warden character was played by Martin Balsam and the Cassavetes character was played by Don Murray. He was paid $15,000 for the role and received his first co-star billing. Though this sum was considered small by movie industry standards, it was the largest fee Poitier received up to then. Ritt, who had been blacklisted, was paid only $10,000.

The film was shot on location at a railroad yard in Manhattan and on St. Nicholas Terrace in New York's Harlem.

The opening title sequence and theatrical release poster were designed by Saul Bass. The score was composed, conducted and orchestrated by Leonard Rosenman.

== Reception ==
=== Box office ===
MGM delayed release of the film because it was uneasy with the racial theme. However, the film was released after receiving rave reviews from preview audiences.

The film was not a commercial success. It did not play in the Southern United States, and was refused by many theater managers because of its depiction of an interracial relationship.

According to MGM records, the film earned rentals of $360,000 in the US and Canada and $400,000 elsewhere, resulting in a loss of $125,000.

=== Critical response ===
The film earned positive reviews, with critics praising the unusual multiracial relationship between the Poitier and Cassavetes characters. Up until then, whites were ordinarily shown in positions of authority. Time magazine noted that the Poitier character "is not only the white man's boss, but is his best friend, and is at all times his superior, possessing greater intelligence, courage, understanding, warmth and general adaptability." Variety said the film was "a milestone in the history of screen in its presentation of an American Negro... a courageous, thought-provoking and exciting film." The London Sunday Times said the film was "splendidly directed" by Ritt.

Poitier's performance received glowing reviews, and the film, along with Blackboard Jungle, helped establish him as "one of Hollywood's few established representatives for black Americans."

Cassavetes also won acclaim for his portrayal, which resembled that of Marlon Brando in On the Waterfront (1954). The Cassavetes character was notable for its hint of homosexuality, which was uncommon for the time. The Motion Picture Production Code Administration allowed the innuendo, but recommended "extremely careful handling to avoid planting the suspicion that he may be homosexual."

The New York Times film critic Bosley Crowther called Edge of the City an "ambitious little film" and "at times close to some sort of fair articulation of the complexities of racial brotherhood." In one scene in which they have lunch at the river, "the attitudes of the young fellows—the white man with terrors in his mind and the Negro with cordial disposition to be as generous with his friendship as with food—are swiftly and trenchantly established in this little scene and the pattern of deep devotion in their subsequent comradeship is prepared." At those times, Crowther said, Edge of the City was a "sharp and searching film." But more often, he said, Aurthur and Ritt "have let their drama fall too patly into the pattern and the lingo of an imitative television show—a television show imitating the film On the Waterfront."

=== Legacy ===
Los Angeles Times critic Dennis Lim, writing in 2009, described Edge of the City and Something of Value (1957) as "variations on an early Poitier specialty, the black-white buddy movie, the most vivid example of which is perhaps Stanley Kramer's The Defiant Ones (1958)," in which Poitier and Tony Curtis played escaped convicts shackled to each other.

One history of African-Americans in film, originally published by author Donald Bogle in 1973, was critical of Poitier's portrayal, referring to him as portraying a "colorless black" with "little ethnic juice in his blood." His death scene is described as being in the tradition of "the dying slave content that he has served the massa." Bogle writes that Poitier's "loyalty to the white Cassavetes destroys him just as much as the old slave's steadfastness kept him in shackles."

In 2023, the film was honored by the Library of Congress after being deemed "culturally, historically, or aesthetically significant", and selected for preservation in the National Film Registry.
