= Never Take No for an Answer =

1951 British–Italian film by Maurice Cloche and Ralph Smart

- American poster
- Directed by: Maurice Cloche; Ralph Smart
- Written by: Maurice Cloche; Paul Gallico; Pauline Gallico
- Based on: The Small Miracle by Paul Gallico
- Produced by: Anthony Havelock-Allan
- Starring: Denis O'Dea; Guido Celano; Nerio Bernardi
- Cinematography: Otto Heller
- Edited by: Sidney Hayers; Peter Graham Scott
- Music by: Nino Rota
- Production company: Constellation Films
- Distributed by: Independent Film Distributors
- Release dates: 18 December 1951 (UK); 28 April 1952 (US)
- Running time: 82 minutes
- Countries: United Kingdom; Italy
- Language: English
- Box office: £136,628 (UK)

Never Take No for an Answer is a 1951 British–Italian drama film directed by Maurice Cloche and Ralph Smart and featuring Denis O'Dea, Vittorio Manunta, Guido Celano and Nerio Bernardi. It is based on Paul Gallico's 1951 story The Small Miracle, about an Italian orphan boy who goes to visit the Pope.

== Plot ==
Nine-year-old war orphan Peppino Arrigo lives in the Italian town of Assisi with his donkey, Violetta. The two are devoted to each other and make a living transporting goods for the locals. One night, Violetta falls seriously ill and Peppino runs for the vet, who, on examining her, tells Peppino that he can do nothing to save her and that she may live for only another week or two. Very worried, Peppino takes Violetta to the church of St Francis, hoping that the priests will let him take her down into the crypt to be blessed and cured at the shrine of St Francis, but the priests will not allow it. Only the Holy Father himself could give such permission. So Peppino decides to take the matter to the very top and, leaving Violetta in the loving care of a friend, he sets off alone on an eighty-mile journey to see the Pope in Rome and get that permission. But, when he finally reaches Rome, he finds to his dismay that getting inside the Vatican to see the Pope will be no mean feat. However, Peppino will not take no for an answer...

== Production ==
The screenplay is by Paul and Pauline Gallico, adapted from his 1951 story. Produced by Anthony Havelock-Allan's Constellation Films, it was directed by Maurice Cloche and Ralph Smart, who both also received screenwriter credit. Assisting with production was Prince Alessandro Tasca di Cutò, a Sicilian aristocrat who was cousin of Giuseppe Tomasi di Lampedusa, author of The Leopard. Nino Rota composed the musical score. The film's actors were mostly dubbed in post-production at the Gate Studios in Elstree. In Italy a separate version was released known as Peppino and Violetta. The film was made with financial backing from the NFFC.

== Reception ==
The film was made by the British entirely in Italy, where special permission was granted for filming to take place inside the Vatican itself. Bosley Crowther, in The New York Times, observed that the film is "particularly adroit in the way in which it works in a stunning panorama of religious buildings in Assisi and Rome". The unusual and beautiful backgrounds of Assisi and Rome were also noted by John Fitzgerald of the BBC film program Current Release. The film was BAFTA nominated for Best British Film of 1951.

A remake was produced in 1974 for the Hallmark Hall of Fame television series.

Actor Ben Kingsley has repeatedly stated seeing the film at a young age inspired him to pursue acting, after being mistaken for "little Peppino" by fellow audience members; Kingsley would develop a friendship with Cloche and Smart at just four years old.

== Cast ==
- Vittorio Manunta as Peppino
- Denis O'Dea as Father Damico
- Guido Celano as Strotti
- Nerio Bernardi as Father Superior
- Clelia Matania as Mrs. Strotti
- Henri Vidon as monk
- Frank Coulson as Dr. Bartolo
- Eliso della Vedova as Sergente dei Carabinieri
- Carlo Borelli as chemist
- Giorgio Riganti as Giuseppe
- Edward Hitchcock as old workman
- Roberto Adamina as Gianni
- Riccardo Foti as Monsignor Magana
- John Murphy as Father O'Brien
- Enzo Fiermonte as Sergeant of Swiss Guards
- Dino Nardi as 1st Monsignor

== Reception ==
The Monthly Film Bulletin wrote: "'The main pleasures of this slender film are visual ones – prettily framed, attractively photographed views of Assisi, the Piazza San Pietro, in Rome, and backgrounds both in and outside the Vatican Palace. Vittorio Manunta gives an endearing performance as Peppino. ... The whimsical, broken English dialogue, mostly post-synchronised, is less to be recommended."

Variety wrote: "This adaptation of Paul Gallico's story will inevitably be compared with The Mudlark, dealing as it does with a small boy's gatecrashing of a holy of holies. ... Pic has some commendable camerawork, and is evenly and convincingly directed, with the Italian setting providing a static rather than a cooperative background. Artistically this picture is a gem, but there is very slender plot and its appeal will be limited to patrons of this restful kind of entertainment."

== See also ==
- Peppino e Violetta (1951)
- Ben Kingsley

== Bibliography ==
- Harper, Sue & Porter, Vincent. British Cinema of the 1950s: The Decline of Deference. Oxford University Press, 2007.
