= On the Night of the Fire =

1939 film by Brian Desmond Hurst

On the Night of the Fire The Fugitive
- Opening titles
- Directed by: Brian Desmond Hurst
- Written by: Brian Desmond Hurst; Patrick Kirwan; Terence Young
- Based on: On the Night of the Fire; 1939 novel by F. L. Green
- Produced by: Josef Somlo
- Starring: Ralph Richardson; Diana Wynyard
- Cinematography: Günther Krampf
- Edited by: Terence Fisher
- Music by: Miklós Rózsa
- Production companies: Greenspan & Seligman Enterprises
- Distributed by: General Film Distributors
- Release dates: 26 October 1939 (UK); 22 July 1940 (U.S.)
- Running time: 94 minutes
- Country: United Kingdom
- Language: English

On the Night of the Fire (U.S. title:The Fugitive) is a 1939 British thriller film directed by Brian Desmond Hurst and starring Ralph Richardson and Diana Wynyard. It was written by Hurst, Patrick Kirwan and Terence Young, based on the novel of the same name by F. L. Green. It was shot on location in Newcastle upon Tyne.

== Plot ==
Struggling Tyneside barber, Will Kobling is in financial trouble. One evening, opportunistically and on impulse, he steals £100 from a factory where a window has been left open. He hopes the money will represent a new start for him and wife Kit. His hopes are dashed when Kit confesses to being in debt to the local draper, Pilleger, who has been pressuring her to settle it. Most of the stolen cash has to go on this.

Pilleger banks the money, only for the police to inform him that the serial numbers of the notes match those stolen from the factory. He professes himself an innocent party, claiming not to know which of his customers they came from, and the police have to let the matter drop. Pilleger blackmails Kobling, promising silence in return for £3 per week. Kobling is horrified at this indefinite burden, but feels obliged to consent.

Some time later, and facing the loss of his business through lack of ready cash, Kobling decides to challenge Pilleger. An opportunity presents itself when a fire breaks out, distracting the police and public. He confronts Pilleger and a fight breaks out, ending in Pilleger's death. The police suspect that Kobling is involved and use psychological tactics to break him down, but he remains grimly silent and sends Kit and their baby to stay with her sister.

Kobling was seen at Pilleger's store on the night of his murder by Lizzie Crane, a well-known eccentric, who talks about what she saw. The populace shun Kobling and call for justice, but the police do not believe Lizzie's word will stand up as evidence. As they continue to put pressure on him, Kobling approaches breaking point. He finally cracks when he is told that Kit has been killed in a road accident.

== Cast ==
- Ralph Richardson as Will Kobling
- Diana Wynyard as Kit Kobling
- Romney Brent as Jimsey Jones
- Mary Clare as Lizzie Crane
- Henry Oscar as Pilleger
- Dave Crowley as Jim Smith
- Gertrude Musgrove as Dora Smith
- Frederick Leister as Inspector
- Ivan Brandt as Wilson
- Sara Allgood as charwoman
- Glynis Johns as Mary Carr
- Amy Dalby as hospital nurse
- Irene Handl as neighbour
- Maire O'Neill as neighbour

== Reception ==
The Monthly Film Bulletin wrote: "Ralph Richardson gives a well-thought-out and interesting performance. He makes Will a pathetic and not wholly unsympathetic figure. Diana Wynyard shows again what an artist she is. She enters wholeheartedly into the spirit , of the part, and her Kit is a moving and beautiful study. This is a gripping and thought-provoking film, but it is not for those in search of light entertainment."

Variety wrote: "With a straightforward story, it's the kind of film either liked very much, or very little. Intensely fascinating is the plot progression in the unravelling of a murder mystery. Picture, adapted from a novel, includes some circumstantial pictorial sequences cleverly substituted for descriptive writing. Ralph Richardson's performance as the harassed criminal is outstanding."

Film critic David Quinlan described the film as "grim but gripping".

Andrew Spicer, in European Film Noir, writes: "A riveting psychological study. With its sustained doom-laden atmosphere, Krampf’s expressive cinematography, its adroit mixture of location shooting and Gothic compositions and Richardson’s wonderful performance as a lower middle-class Everyman, On the Night of the Fire clearly shows that an achieved mastery of film noir existed in British cinema".
