= On the Night of the Fire (novel) =

1939 novel

- Author: F. L. Green
- Language: English
- Genre: Crime drama
- Publisher: Michael Joseph
- Publication date: 1939
- Publication place: United Kingdom
- Media type: Print

On the Night of the Fire is a 1939 crime drama novel by the British writer F. L. Green. It was Green's second published novel and his breakthrough work.

== Film adaptation ==
The same year it was adapted into a British film of the same title directed by Brian Desmond Hurst, and starring Ralph Richardson and Diana Wynyard. It is considered an early film noir.

== Bibliography ==
- Goble, Alan. The Complete Index to Literary Sources in Film. Walter de Gruyter, 1999.
- Grant, Kevin. Roots of Film Noir: Precursors from the Silent Era to the 1940s. McFarland, 2002.
- Moore, Matthew Dwight. Watching Cosmic Time: The Suspense Films of Hitchcock, Welles, and Reed. Wipf and Stock Publishers, 26 Oct 2022.
- Reilly, John M. Twentieth Century Crime & Mystery Writers. Springer, 2015.
