= The Philco Television Playhouse =

American TV anthology series (1948–1955)

- Genre: Anthology drama
- Directed by: Fred Coe; Vincent J. Donehue; Gordon Duff; Herbert Hirschman; Delbert Mann; Robert Mulligan; Arthur Penn; Ira Skutch
- Composer: Morris Mamorsky
- Country of origin: United States
- Original language: English
- No. of seasons: 7
- No. of episodes: 251

Production
- Producers: Fred Coe; Gordon Duff; Ira Skutch
- Running time: 46–50 minutes

Original release
- Network: NBC
- Release: October 3, 1948 – October 2, 1955

Related
- Goodyear Television Playhouse; The Alcoa Hour

The Philco Television Playhouse is an American television anthology series that was broadcast live on NBC from 1948 to 1955. Produced by Fred Coe, the series was sponsored by Philco. It was one of the most respected dramatic shows of the Golden Age of Television, winning a 1954 Peabody Award and receiving eight Emmy nominations between 1951 and 1956.

== Season overview and highlights ==
For the first season, Philco entered into a partnership with the Actors’ Equity Association to produce adaptations of Broadway plays and musicals with Bert Lytell, silent film era actor and Honorary Life President of Equity, as host. The first episode was Dinner at Eight by George S. Kaufman and Edna Ferber. Ronald Wayne Rodman, in his book Tuning in: American Narrative Television Music, noted, "Despite ensuing complications over the legalities of broadcasting copyrighted plays on television and several legal battles that ensued, the show flourished." That flourishing came at a cost, however, as the trade publication Variety reported in January 1949 that the program had gone $126,000 over budget since its premiere. Increased costs were said to result from fees spent for rights to produce plays and "considerably higher talent fees", with José Ferrer cited as an example. Philco executives were "reportedly seriously disturbed" that, despite the expenditures, the show had yet to make the top 10 shows in ratings, while Toast of the Town (its competition on CBS) was consistently rated second or third.

The title of the show was briefly changed to NBC Drama Theatre, Repertory Theatre and Arena Theatre during part of the first season, but then reverted to The Philco Television Playhouse.

The second season consisted mostly of adaptations of popular novels from the Book of the Month Club. During later seasons, both original stories and adaptations were used.

Beginning in October 1951, Philco shared sponsorship of the program with Goodyear, with the title alternating between Philco Television Playhouse and Goodyear Television Playhouse to reflect that week's sponsor. (Reference sources sometimes refer to the alternating programs collectively as the Philco/Goodyear Television Playhouse or the Philco-Goodyear Television Playhouse, although neither are actual program titles.)

In the sixth season, Cathleen Nesbitt and Maureen Stapleton starred in Chayefsky's The Mother (April 4, 1954). This is one of the rare teleplays from television's Golden Age to be restaged on TV decades later, a Great Performances production on October 24, 1994, with Anne Bancroft and Joan Cusack.

The seventh season began September 19, 1954, with E. G. Marshall and Eva Marie Saint in Chayefsky's Middle of the Night, a play which moved to Broadway 15 months later and was filmed under the same title by Columbia Pictures in 1959.

A single source suggests that Philco Television Playhouse continued into 1956, although most other sources agree that the final production came on October 2, 1955. This was Robert Alan Aurthur's A Man Is Ten Feet Tall, co-starring Don Murray and Sidney Poitier, which was adapted and expanded into the 1957 MGM feature film, Edge of the City, with Poitier recreating his original role and John Cassavetes in Murray's part.

On October 16, 1955, Alcoa took over sponsorship from Philco and The Alcoa Hour alternated with Goodyear Television Playhouse for two more seasons.

== Cast and writers ==
Among the many performers on the Philco Television Playhouse were James Dean, Lillian Gish, Janet De Gore, Melvyn Douglas, Grace Kelly, Jack Klugman, Cloris Leachman, Walter Matthau, Rod Steiger, Steve McQueen, Felicia Montealegre Bernstein, Paul Muni, ZaSu Pitts, Eva Marie Saint, Everett Sloane, Kim Stanley, Eli Wallach and Joanne Woodward. Many of these actors were making their first television appearance; one was Jose Ferrer, who recreated his stage performance in a one-hour television condensation of Cyrano de Bergerac on January 9, 1949, a full year before the 1950 film version, for which Ferrer won an Oscar, was released. Another was Paul Muni, who starred in the 1948 presentation Counsellor-at Law.

The series launched the television writing careers of Robert Alan Aurthur, Paddy Chayefsky, Sumner Locke Elliott, Horton Foote, Tad Mosel, William Templeton, Arnold Schulman, and Gore Vidal. Its most famous drama was Chayefsky's Marty (May 24, 1953), which starred Rod Steiger and was later made into a movie that won the Academy Award for Best Picture.

== Critical reception ==
The trade publication Variety commended the Playhouse's "Pride and Prejudice" episode (January 23, 1949) and generalized, "It's getting so that viewers can take for granted this show's superior taste and overall production excellence. This is video at its adult best." Regarding that specific production, the review praised Samuel Taylor's adaptation, Fred Coe's direction, Harry Sosnick's musical score, and the acting of Madge Evans and Viola Roache.

== U.S. television ratings ==
Seasonal rankings (based on average total viewers per episode) of The Philco Television Playhouse on NBC.

Season	TV season	Ranking	Viewers (in millions)
3rd	1950–1951	#3	4.620
4th	1951–1952	#12	6.181
5th	1952–1953	#17	7.609
6th	1953–1954	#19	8.450

== In popular culture ==
In 2006, the NBC series Studio 60 on the Sunset Strip referenced The Philco Television Playhouse as The Philco Comedy Hour, a comedy show that aired on the fictional NBS network. Eli Wallach made a guest appearance on Studio 60, playing a former show writer who was blacklisted in the 1950s.

== Episodes ==
=== Season 1 (1948–1949) ===
No. overall	No. in season	Title	Original release date
1	1	"Dinner at Eight"	October 3, 1948
2	2	"Rebecca"	October 10, 1948
3	3	"Counselor-at-Law"	October 17, 1948
4	4	"Angel in the Wings"	October 24, 1948
5	5	"Street Scene"	October 31, 1948
6	6	"This Thing Called Love"	November 7, 1948
7	7	"Camille"	November 14, 1948
8	8	"An Inspector Calls"	November 21, 1948
9	9	"I Like It Here"	November 28, 1948
10	10	"Suspect"	December 5, 1948
11	11	"Parlor Story"	December 12, 1948
12	12	"A Christmas Carol"	December 19, 1948
13	13	"The Old Lady Shows Her Medals"	December 26, 1948
14	14	"Ramshackle Inn"	January 2, 1949
15	15	"Cyrano de Bergerac"	January 9, 1949
16	16	"Papa Is All"	January 16, 1949
17	17	"Pride and Prejudice"	January 23, 1949
18	18	"Dark Hammock"	January 30, 1949
19	19	"The Late Christopher Bean"	February 6, 1949
20	20	"The Story of Mary Surratt"	February 13, 1949
21	21	"Twelfth Night"	February 20, 1949
22	22	"St. Helena"	February 27, 1949
23	23	"The Druid Circle"	March 6, 1949
24	24	"Quality Street"	March 13, 1949
25	25	"Dinner at Antoine's"	March 20, 1949
26	26	"Becky Sharp"	March 27, 1949
27	27	"And Never Been Kissed"	April 3, 1949
28	28	"What Makes Sammy Run?"	April 10, 1949
29	29	"Mr. Mergenthwirker's Lobblies"	April 17, 1949
30	30	"Burlesque"	April 24, 1949
31	31	"Macbeth"	May 1, 1949
32	32	"Romeo and Juliet"	May 15, 1949
33	33	"This Time, Next Year"	June 5, 1949
34	34	"It Pays To Advertise"	June 12, 1949
35	35	"Summer Formal"	June 19, 1949
36	36	"Jenny Kissed Me"	June 26, 1949
37	37	"Dark of the Moon"	July 3, 1949
38	38	"For Love or Money"	July 10, 1949
39	39	"The Five Lives of Richard Gordon"	July 17, 1949
40	40	"You Touched Me!"	July 24, 1949
41	41	"The Fourth Wall"	July 31, 1949
42	42	"Enter Madame"	August 7, 1949
43	43	"A Murder Has Been Arranged"	August 14, 1949
44	44	"Pretty Little Parlor"	August 21, 1949
45	45	"Three Concerned Moon"	August 28, 1949

=== Season 2 (1949–1950) ===
No. overall	No. in season	Title	Original release date
46	1	"What Every Woman Knows"	September 4, 1949
47	2	"Pride's Castle"	September 11, 1949
48	3	"The Little Sister"	September 18, 1949
49	4	"The Lonely"	September 25, 1949
50	5	"The Queen Bee"	October 2, 1949
51	6	"Something's Got To Give"	October 9, 1949
52	7	"The Last Tycoon"	October 16, 1949
53	8	"Because of the Lockwoods"	October 23, 1949
54	9	"Damion's Daughter"	October 30, 1949
55	10	"The House of the Seven Gables"	November 6, 1949
56	11	"The Promise"	November 13, 1949
57	12	"Medical Meeting"	November 20, 1949
58	13	"The Wonderful Mrs. Ingram"	November 27, 1949
59	14	"Mist on the Waters"	December 4, 1949
60	15	"The Beautiful Bequest"	December 11, 1949
61	16	"The Strange Christmas Dinner"	December 18, 1949
62	17	"In Beauty Like the Night"	December 25, 1949
63	18	"Little Boy Lost"	January 1, 1950
64	19	"Bethel Merriday"	January 8, 1950
65	20	"Murder at the Stork Club"	January 15, 1950
66	21	"The Marriages"	January 22, 1950
67	22	"Uncle Dynamite"	January 29, 1950
68	23	"The Sudden Guest"	February 5, 1950
69	24	"Ann Rutledge"	February 12, 1950
70	25	"Letter to Mr Priest"	February 19, 1950
71	26	"Hometown"	February 26, 1950
72	27	"The Life of Vincent Van Gogh"	March 5, 1950
73	28	"The Uncertain Molly Collicutt"	March 12, 1950
74	29	"The Trial of Steve Kent"	March 19, 1950
75	30	"The Second Oldest Profession"	March 26, 1950
76	31	"Nocturne"	April 2, 1950
77	32	"Dirty Eddie"	April 9, 1950
78	33	"The End Is Known"	April 16, 1950
79	34	"The Man in the Black Hat"	April 23, 1950
80	35	"The American"	April 30, 1950
81	36	"The Feast"	May 7, 1950
82	37	"Brat Farrar"	May 14, 1950
83	38	"The Charmed Circle"	May 21, 1950
84	39	"Semmelweis (Everett Sloane, Felicia Montealegre, E. G. Marshall, Mercer McLeod)"	May 28, 1950
85	40	"Sense and Sensibility"	June 4, 1950
86	41	"The Bump on Brannigan's Head"	June 11, 1950
87	42	"Anything Can Happen"	June 18, 1950
88	43	"Hear My Heart Speak"	June 25, 1950
89	44	"The Reluctant Landlord"	July 2, 1950
90	45	"The Tentacles"	July 9, 1950

=== Season 3 (1950–1951) ===
No. overall	No. in season	Title	Original release date
91	1	"High Tor"	September 10, 1950

Other episodes in this season included "Requiem for a Model A" on October 7, 1951.

== Awards and nominations ==
The Philco Television Playhouse awards and nominations
Awards and nominations
Award	Wins	Nominations
Peabody Award	1	1
Primetime Emmy Awards	0	7

Totals (Note: Certain award groups do not simply award one winner. They acknowledge several different recipients, have runners-up, and have third place. Since this is a specific recognition and is different from losing an award, runner-up mentions are considered wins in this award tally. For simplification and to avoid errors, each award in this list has been presumed to have had a prior nomination.)
- Wins: 1
- Nominations: 8

Year	Nominated work	Award	Category	Result
1951	The Philco Television Playhouse	Primetime Emmy Awards	Best Dramatic Show	Nominated
1952	Goodyear Television Playhouse	Primetime Emmy Awards	Best Dramatic Show	Nominated
1954	Goodyear Television Playhouse	Primetime Emmy Awards	Best Dramatic Show	Nominated
1954	NBC	Peabody Award	—N/a	Won
1955	The Philco Television Playhouse	Primetime Emmy Awards	Best Dramatic Series	Nominated
1955	Eva Marie Saint on The Philco Television Playhouse (Episode: "Middle of the Night")	Primetime Emmy Awards	Best Actress in a Single Performance	Nominated
1955	Paddy Chayefsky for The Philco Television Playhouse	Primetime Emmy Awards	Best Written Dramatic Material	Nominated
1956	Robert Alan Aurthur for The Philco Television Playhouse (Episode: "A Man Is Ten Feet Tall")	Primetime Emmy Awards	Best Original Teleplay Writing	
