= Hungry Hill (film) =

- Directed by: Brian Desmond Hurst
- Written by: Terence Young; Daphne du Maurier
- Based on: the novel by Daphne du Maurier
- Produced by: William Sistrom executive Filippo Del Giudice; J. Arthur Rank (uncredited)
- Starring: Margaret Lockwood; Dennis Price; Cecil Parker; Michael Denison; F. J. McCormick; Jean Simmons; Dermot Walsh
- Cinematography: Desmond Dickinson
- Edited by: Alan Jaggs
- Music by: John Greenwood, played by the London Symphony Orchestra, directed by Muir Mathieson
- Production company: Two Cities Films
- Distributed by: General Film Distributors (UK); Universal International (US)
- Release date: 7 January 1947 (London)
- Running time: 109 minutes
- Country: United Kingdom
- Language: English
- Budget: £375,600
- Box office: £174,000

Hungry Hill is a 1947 British film directed by Brian Desmond Hurst and starring Margaret Lockwood, Dennis Price and Cecil Parker with a screenplay by Terence Young and Daphne du Maurier, from the 1943 novel by du Maurier.

== Plot ==
A feud is waged between two families in Ireland – the Brodricks and the Donovans – over the sinking of a copper mine in Hungry Hill by "Copper John" Brodrick. The feud has repercussions down three generations.

Copper John Brodrick wants to mine copper at Hungry Hill. Of his two sons, Henry is enthusiastic but Greyhound John is reluctant. The mine goes ahead despite opposition of the Donovan family.

Fanny Rosa flirts with both John and Henry. The Donovans lead a riot at the mine which results in Henry's death.

John becomes a lawyer and is the heir to the mine, but is reluctant to take over. He resumes his romance with Fanny Rosa.

== Cast ==
- Margaret Lockwood as Fanny Rosa
- Dennis Price as Greyhound John Brodrick
- Cecil Parker as Copper John Brodrick
- Michael Denison as Henry Brodrick
- F.J. McCormick as Old Tim
- Jean Simmons as Jane Brodrick
- Dermot Walsh as Wild Johnnie Brodrick
- Arthur Sinclair as Morty Donovan
- Eileen Crowe as Bridget
- Eileen Herlie as Katherine
- Barbara Waring as Barbara Brodrick
- Michael Golden as Sam Donovan
- Siobhán McKenna as Kate Donovan
- Dan O'Herlihy as Harry Brodrick
- Henry Mollison as Dr. Armstrong
- Eddie Byrne as Hennessy
- Guy Rolfe as Miner

== Production ==
Daphne du Maurier's novel was a best seller. Film rights were bought by Two Cities who assigned William Sistrom to produce. Brian Desmond Hurst was the director and it was decided to film on location in Ireland.

Background filming began in County Wicklow in September 1945. Studio filming did not begin until March 1946 in Denham.

The female lead was offered to Geraldine Fitzgerald but she was unable to get out of her US commitments. The producers approached Sally Gray who turned it down as she did not wish to grow old on camera. Margaret Lockwood played the role instead, once she finished with Bedelia. Lockwood's real life daughter player her daughter in the film.

Robert Cummings was mentioned for the male lead.

According to Dermot Walsh, Brian Desmond Hurst wanted Seamus Locke to play Wild Johnny but producer Bill Sistrom insisted on Walsh. "They had a bit of a barney over that", says Walsh. "After I made an exhaustive test, Sistrom called in all the girls from the front office, sat them down and ran the test. The girls got me the part!"

Walsh says the film took around five months to make. "Every shot was composed, they'd spend hours trying to get it as beautiful and as dramatically effective as possible."

Variety reported its budget at US$1.5 million although the exact figure was £375,600.

== Reception ==
=== Box office ===
The producer's earned £113,200 from the film in the UK and only £40,800 from other territories, a total of £174,000. This was a disappointment compared to earlier Lockwood films. According to Rank's own records the film had made a loss of £201,200 for the company by December 1949.

=== Critical ===
The Monthly Film Bulletin wrote: "The film seems to leave only the dry bones of Daphne du Maurier's novel, and somehow what is left is not entirely convincing; it conveys a feeling of artificiality. Cecil Parker is excellent as John Brodrick, and Dennis Price entirely adequate as the younger John. All the Irish players are good and, left to themselves, would no doubt have created a genuinely Irish atmosphere. However, Margaret Lockwood, who dominates the film, is not Irish and gives no illusion of so being."

The New York Times wrote: "The film's running time is about average, ninety minutes, but the narrative, for all its ample conflict, progresses so ponderously that it seems interminable ... The few moments of effective cinema in Hungry Hill are so fleeting as to be easily forgotten, but the sequence wherein a staid ball is turned into a lively jig session by the infectious music of a fiddler from the town is a bit of expert staging which you probably won't see duplicated again soon. The spontaneity and brilliant conception of this scene is almost sufficient cause to make one show more tolerance toward Hungry Hill than it deserves." Variety wrote: "This adaptation of Daphne du Maurier's best-seller is a sombre heavyweight created with care, but falling with a sad crash through absence of humanity and real feeling. For painstaking thoroughness the film deserves commendation, but with one or two exceptions the characters have no red blood in their veins and little interest is aroused in the fate of most of the principals. Cardinal failing, as with so many British films, is lack of heart."
