= F. L. Green =

British author (1902–1953)

- Born: Frederick Laurence Green; 6 April 1902 Portsmouth, Hampshire, England
- Died: 14 April 1953 (aged 51) Bristol, England
- Occupation: Author, writer
- Genre: Fiction

Frederick Laurence Green (6 April 1902 – 14 April 1953) was a British writer who had 14 titles published between 1934 and 1952. He is best known for his 1945 novel, Odd Man Out, which was adapted into a film.

Born in Portsmouth, on 6 April 1902, Green published his first novel, Julius Penton, in 1934. It was his second book, 1939's On the Night of the Fire, which made his name. On the Night of the Fire was also adapted for the screen in 1939 and directed by Brian Desmond Hurst.

In 1929, he married Irish-born Margaret Edwards, with whom he lived in Belfast from the mid-1930s. His last novel, Ambush for the Hunter, was published in 1952.

Green died in Bristol, on 14 April 1953, aged 51.

== Works ==
- Julius Penton (John Murray, 1934)
- On the Night of the Fire (Michael Joseph, 1939)
- The Sound of Winter (Michael Joseph, 1940)
- Give Us the World (Michael Joseph, 1941)
- Music in the Park (Michael Joseph, 1942)
- A Song for the Angels (Michael Joseph, 1943)
- On the Edge of the Sea (Michael Joseph, 1944)
- Odd Man Out (Michael Joseph, 1945)
- A Flask for the Journey (Michael Joseph, 1946)
- A Fragment of Glass (Michael Joseph, 1947)
- Mist on the Waters (Michael Joseph, 1948)
- Clouds in the Wind (Michael Joseph, 1950)
- The Magician (Michael Joseph, 1951)
- Ambush for the Hunter (Michael Joseph, 1952)
