= 8th Primetime Emmy Awards =

1956 American television programming awards

- Date: March 17, 1956
- Location: Pan Pacific Auditorium, Los Angeles, California
- Presented by: Academy of Television Arts and Sciences
- Hosted by: Art Linkletter; John Charles Daly

Highlights
- Most awards: The Phil Silvers Show; Producers' Showcase (4)
- Most nominations: Producers' Showcase (12)
- Best Comedy Series: The Phil Silvers Show
- Best Dramatic Series: Producers' Showcase
- Best Variety Series: The Ed Sullivan Show

Television/radio coverage
- Network: NBC

The 8th Emmy Awards, later referred to as the 8th Primetime Emmy Awards, were held on March 17, 1956, to honor the best in television of the year. The ceremony was held at the Pan Pacific Auditorium in Hollywood, California and was hosted by Art Linkletter and John Charles Daly. All nominations are listed, with winners in bold and series' networks are in parentheses.

The top shows of the night were The Phil Silvers Show, and Producers' Showcase. Each show won a record four major awards. Producers' Showcase, with its twelve major nominations, became the first show to receive over ten major nominations. (Both of these records were subsequently passed by multiple shows).

== Winners and nominees ==
Winners are listed first, highlighted in boldface, and indicated with a double dagger (‡).

=== Programs ===
Programs
**Best Comedy Series**: **The Phil Silvers Show (CBS)**‡; The Bob Cummings Show (CBS); Caesar's Hour (NBC); The George Gobel Show (NBC); The Jack Benny Program (CBS); Make Room for Daddy (ABC)	**Best Dramatic Series**: **Producers' Showcase (NBC)**‡; Climax! (CBS); Goodyear Television Playhouse (NBC); Studio One (CBS); The United States Steel Hour (CBS)
**Best Variety Series**: **The Ed Sullivan Show (CBS)**‡; The Dinah Shore Show (NBC); Ford Star Jubilee (CBS); The Perry Como Show (NBC); Shower of Stars (CBS)	**Best Audience Participation Series (Quiz, Panel, Etc.)**: **The $64,000 Question (CBS)**‡; I've Got a Secret (CBS); People Are Funny (NBC); What's My Line? (CBS); You Bet Your Life (NBC)
**Best Action or Adventure Series**: **Disneyland (ABC)**‡; Alfred Hitchcock Presents (CBS); Dragnet (NBC); Gunsmoke (CBS); The Lineup (CBS)	**Best Children's Series**: **Lassie (CBS)**‡; Ding Dong School (NBC); Kukla, Fran and Ollie (ABC); The Mickey Mouse Club (ABC); The Pinky Lee Show (NBC); Puppet Playhouse (NBC)
**Best Documentary Program**: **Omnibus (CBS)**‡; Meet the Press (NBC); Person to Person (CBS); See It Now (CBS); Wide Wide World (NBC)	**Best Special Event or News Program**: **A-Bomb Coverage (CBS)**‡; 7th Primetime Emmy Awards (NBC); 27th Academy Awards (NBC); Rose Bowl (NBC); World Series (NBC)
**Best Music Series**: **Your Hit Parade (NBC)**‡; Coke Time with Eddie Fisher (NBC); The Dinah Shore Show (NBC); The Perry Como Show (NBC); The Voice of Firestone (CBS)	**Best Contribution to Daytime Programming**: **Matinee Theatre (NBC)**‡; The Bob Crosby Show (CBS); The Garry Moore Show (CBS); Home (NBC); Today (NBC)
**Best Single Program of the Year**: **Producers' Showcase: "Peter Pan" (NBC)**‡; Disneyland: "Davy Crocket and the River Pirates" (ABC); Ford Star Jubilee: "The Caine Mutiny Court-Martial" (CBS); Make Room for Daddy: "Peter Pan Meets Rusty Williams" (ABC); Producers' Showcase: "The Sleeping Beauty" (NBC); The United States Steel Hour: "No Time for Sergeants" (CBS); Wide Wide World: "The American West" (NBC)

=== Acting ===
==== Lead performances ====
Lead performances
**Best Actor in a Continuing Performance**: **Phil Silvers – The Phil Silvers Show as MSgt. Ernest G. Bilko (CBS)**‡; Robert Cummings – The Bob Cummings Show as Bob Collins (CBS); Jackie Gleason – The Honeymooners as Ralph Kramden (CBS); Danny Thomas – Make Room for Daddy as Danny Williams (ABC); Robert Young – Father Knows Best as Jim Anderson (CBS)	**Best Actress in a Continuing Performance**: **Lucille Ball – I Love Lucy as Lucy Ricardo (CBS)**‡; Gracie Allen – The George Burns and Gracie Allen Show as Gracie Allen (CBS); Eve Arden – Our Miss Brooks as Connie Brooks (CBS); Ann Sothern – Private Secretary as Susie McNamara (CBS)

==== Supporting performances ====
Supporting performances
**Best Actor in a Supporting Role**: **Art Carney – The Honeymooners as Ed Norton (CBS)**‡; Ed Begley – Kraft Television Theatre: "Patterns" as Andy Sloane (NBC); William Frawley – I Love Lucy as Fred Mertz (CBS); Carl Reiner – Caesar's Hour as various characters (NBC); Cyril Ritchard – Producers' Showcase: "Peter Pan" as Mr. Darling / Captain Hook (NBC)	**Best Actress in a Supporting Role**: **Nanette Fabray – Caesar's Hour as various characters (NBC)**‡; Ann B. Davis – The Bob Cummings Show: "Schultzy's Dream World" as Charmaine Schultz (CBS); Jean Hagen – Make Room for Daddy as Margaret Williams (ABC); Audrey Meadows – The Honeymooners as Alice Kramden (CBS); Thelma Ritter – Goodyear Television Playhouse: "The Catered Affair" as Aggie Hurley (NBC)

==== Single performances ====
Single performances
**Best Actor in a Single Performance**: **Lloyd Nolan – Ford Star Jubilee: "The Caine Mutiny Court-Martial" as Capt. Queeg (CBS)**‡; Ralph Bellamy – The United States Steel Hour: "The Fearful Decision" as the Father (CBS); José Ferrer – Producers' Showcase: "Cyrano de Bergerac" as Cyrano (NBC); Everett Sloane – Kraft Television Theatre: "Patterns" as the President (NBC); Barry Sullivan – Ford Star Jubilee: "The Caine Mutiny Court-Martial" as Defense Attorney Greenwald (CBS)	**Best Actress in a Single Performance**: **Mary Martin – Producers' Showcase: "Peter Pan" as Peter Pan (NBC)**‡; Julie Harris – The United States Steel Hour: "A Wind from the South" as Shevawn (CBS); Eva Marie Saint – Producers' Showcase: "Our Town" as Emily (NBC); Jessica Tandy – Producers' Showcase: "The Fourposter" as the Wife (NBC); Loretta Young – The Loretta Young Show: "Christmas Stopover" as Sadie (NBC)

=== Directing ===
Directing
**Best Director for a Film Series**: **The Phil Silvers Show – Nat Hiken (CBS)**‡; Alfred Hitchcock Presents: "The Case of Mr. Pelham" – Alfred Hitchcock (CBS); The Bob Cummings Show – Rod Amateau (CBS); Dragnet – Jack Webb (NBC); Make Room for Daddy – Sheldon Leonard (ABC); You Are There – Bernard Girard (CBS)	**Best Director for a Live Series**: **Ford Star Jubilee: "The Caine Mutiny Court-Martial" – Franklin Schaffner (CBS)**‡; Climax!: "Portrait in Celluloid" – John Frankenheimer (CBS); Producers' Showcase: "Our Town" – Delbert Mann (NBC); Producers' Showcase: "Peter Pan" – Clark Jones (NBC); The United States Steel Hour: "No Time for Sergeants" – Alex Segal (CBS)

=== Producing ===
Producing
**Best Producer for a Film Series**: **Disneyland – Walt Disney (ABC)**‡; The Bob Cummings Show – Paul Henning (CBS); Medic – Frank LaTourette (NBC); The Phil Silvers Show – Nat Hiken (CBS); You Are There – James D. Fonda (CBS)	**Best Producer for a Live Series**: **Producers' Showcase – Fred Coe (NBC)**‡; Alcoa-Goodyear Playhouse – Herbert Brodkin (NBC); Climax! – Martin Manulis (CBS); The George Gobel Show – Hal Kanter (NBC); The United States Steel Hour – The Theatre Guild (CBS); Wide Wide World – Barry Wood (NBC)

=== Writing ===
Writing
**Best Original Teleplay Writing**: **Kraft Television Theatre: "Patterns" – Rod Serling (NBC)**‡; Alcoa-Goodyear Playhouse: "A Catered Affair" – Paddy Chayefsky (NBC); Alcoa-Goodyear Playhouse: "Thunder over Washington" – David Davidson (NBC); The Philco Television Playhouse: "A Man is Ten Feet Tall" – Robert Alan Aurthur (NBC); The United States Steel Hour: "Fearful Decision" – Cyril Hume and Richard Maibaum (CBS)	**Best Television Adaptation**: **Ford Star Jubilee: "The Caine Mutiny Court-Martial" – Paul Gregory and Franklin Schaffner (CBS)**‡; The 20th Century Fox Hour: "Miracle on 34th Street" – John Monks (CBS); The 20th Century Fox Hour: "The Ox-Bow Incident" – David Dortort (CBS); Climax!: "The Champion" – Rod Serling (CBS); Producers' Showcase: "Our Town" – David Shaw (NBC)
**Best Comedy Writing**: **The Phil Silvers Show – Arnold Auerbach, Barry Blitzer, Vincent Bogert, Nat Hiken, Coleman Jacoby, Harvey Orkin, Arnold Rosen, Terry Ryan and Tony Webster (CBS)**‡; Caesar's Hour – Mel Brooks, Selma Diamond, Larry Gelbart, Sheldon Keller and Mel Tolkin (NBC); The George Gobel Show – Everett Greenbaum, Hal Kanter, Howard Leeds and Harry Winkler (NBC); I Love Lucy – Bob Carroll, Jr., Jess Oppenheimer, Madelyn Pugh Davis, Bob Schiller and Bob Weiskopf (CBS); The Jack Benny Program – George Balzer, Hal Goldman, Al Gordon and Sam Perrin (CBS)

=== Best Specialty Act – Single or Group ===
Best Specialty Act
**Best Specialty Act – Single or Group**
- **Marcel Marceau**
  - Harry Belafonte
  - Victor Borge
  - Sammy Davis Jr.
  - Donald O'Connor

== Most major nominations ==
Networks with multiple major nominations (Note: "Major" constitutes the categories listed above: Program, Acting, Directing, and Writing. Does not include the technical categories.)
Network	Number of Nominations
CBS	61
NBC	54
ABC	11

Programs with multiple major nominations
Program	Category	Network	Number of Nominations
Producers' Showcase	Drama	NBC	12
The United States Steel Hour	Drama	CBS	7
Ford Star Jubilee	Variety	CBS	6
The Bob Cummings Show	Comedy	CBS	5
Make Room for Daddy	Comedy	ABC	5
The Phil Silvers Show	Comedy	CBS	5
Caesar's Hour	Comedy	NBC	4
Climax!	Drama	CBS	4
Alcoa-Goodyear Playhouse	Drama	NBC	3
Disneyland	Action/Adventure	ABC	3
The George Gobel Show	Comedy	NBC	3
The Honeymooners	Comedy	CBS	3
I Love Lucy	Comedy	CBS	3
Kraft Television Theatre	Drama	NBC	3
Wide Wide World	Documentary	NBC	3
The 20th Century Fox Hour	Drama	CBS	2
Alfred Hitchcock Presents	Action/Adventure	CBS	2
The Dinah Shore Show	Music/Variety	NBC	2
Dragnet	Action/Adventure	NBC	2
Goodyear Television Playhouse	Drama	NBC	2
The Jack Benny Program	Comedy	CBS	2
The Perry Como Show	Music/Variety	NBC	2
You Are There	Documentary	CBS	2

== Most major awards ==
Networks with multiple major awards
Network	Number of Awards
CBS	14
NBC	8
ABC	2

Programs with multiple major awards
Program	Category	Network	Number of Awards
The Phil Silvers Show	Comedy	CBS	4
Producers' Showcase	Drama	NBC	4
Ford Star Jubilee	Variety	CBS	3
Disneyland	Action/Adventure	ABC	2
