= 10th Primetime Emmy Awards =

1958 American television programming awards

- Date: April 15, 1958
- Location: Coconut Grove, Hollywood, California
- Presented by: Academy of Television Arts and Sciences
- Hosted by: Danny Thomas

Highlights
- Most awards: Playhouse 90 (4)
- Most nominations: Playhouse 90 (11)
- Best Comedy Series: The Phil Silvers Show
- Best Dramatic Series with Continuing Characters: Gunsmoke
- Best Dramatic Anthology Series: Playhouse 90
- Best Musical, Variety, Audience Participation or Quiz Series: The Dinah Shore Chevy Show
- Best Public Service Program or Series: Omnibus

Television/radio coverage
- Network: NBC

The 10th Emmy Awards, later referred to as the 10th Primetime Emmy Awards, were held on April 15, 1958, to honor the best in television of the year. The ceremony was held at the Coconut Grove in Hollywood, California. It was hosted by Danny Thomas. All nominations are listed, with winners in bold and series' networks are in parentheses.

The anthology drama Playhouse 90, was the top show for the second consecutive year, earning the most major nominations (11) and wins (4).

== Winners and nominees ==
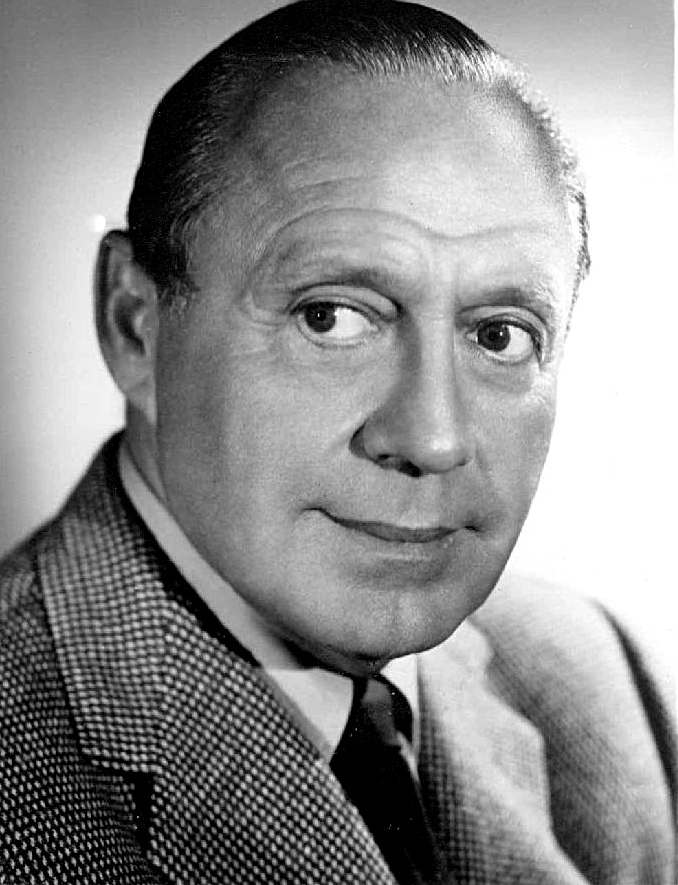
Jack Benny, Best Continuing Performance (Male) in a Series by a Comedian, Singer, Host, Dancer, M.C., Announcer, Narrator, Panelist, or any Person who Essentially Plays Himself winner

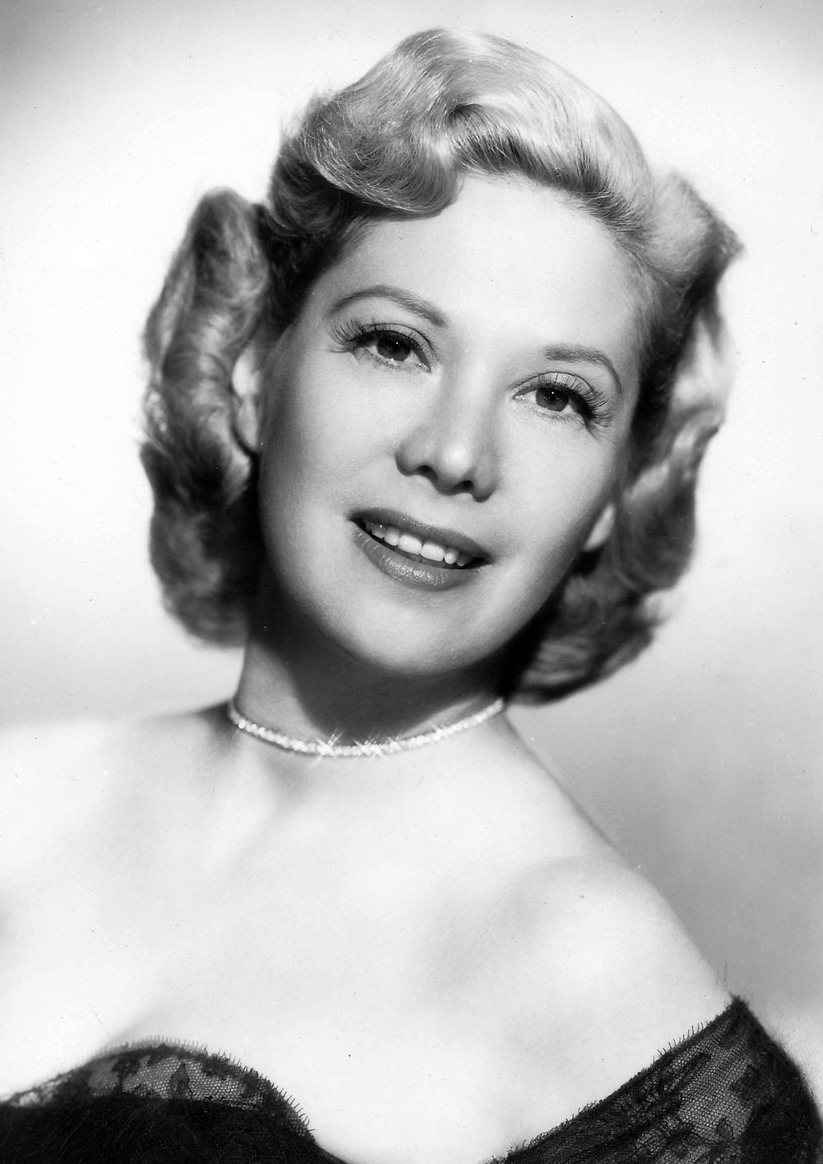
Dinah Shore, Best Continuing Performance (Female) in a Series by a Comedienne, Singer, Hostess, Dancer, M.C., Announcer, Narrator, Panelist, or any Person who Essentially Plays Herself winner

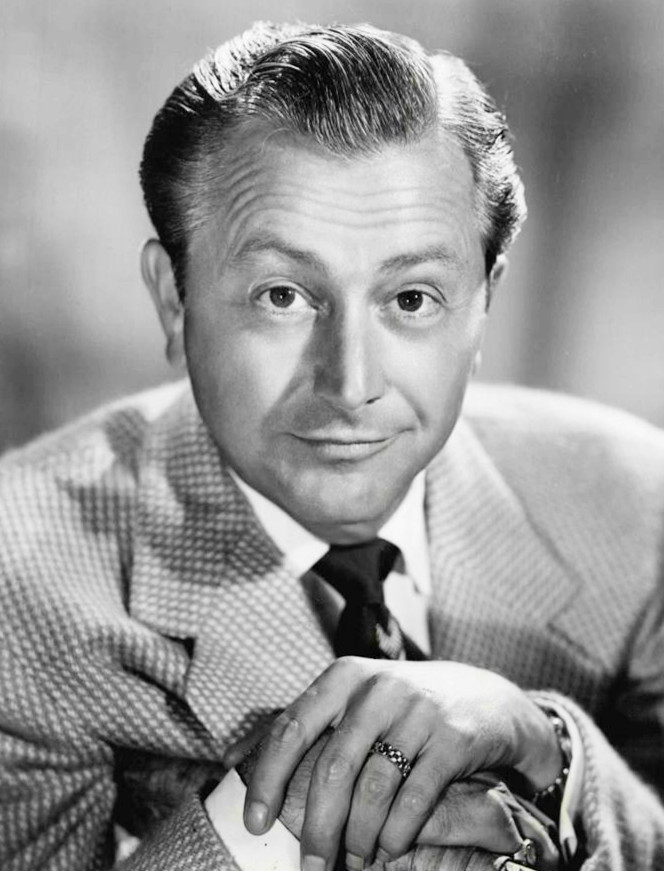
Robert Young, Best Continuing Performance by an Actor in a Leading Role in a Dramatic or Comedy Series winner

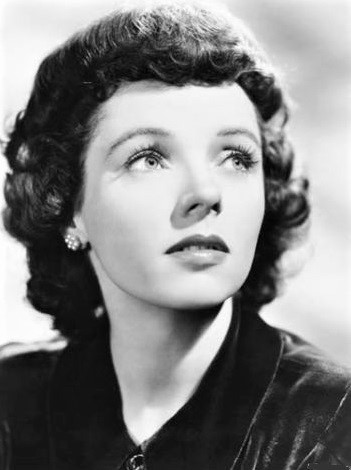
Jane Wyatt, Best Continuing Performance by an Actress in a Leading Role in a Dramatic or Comedy Series winner

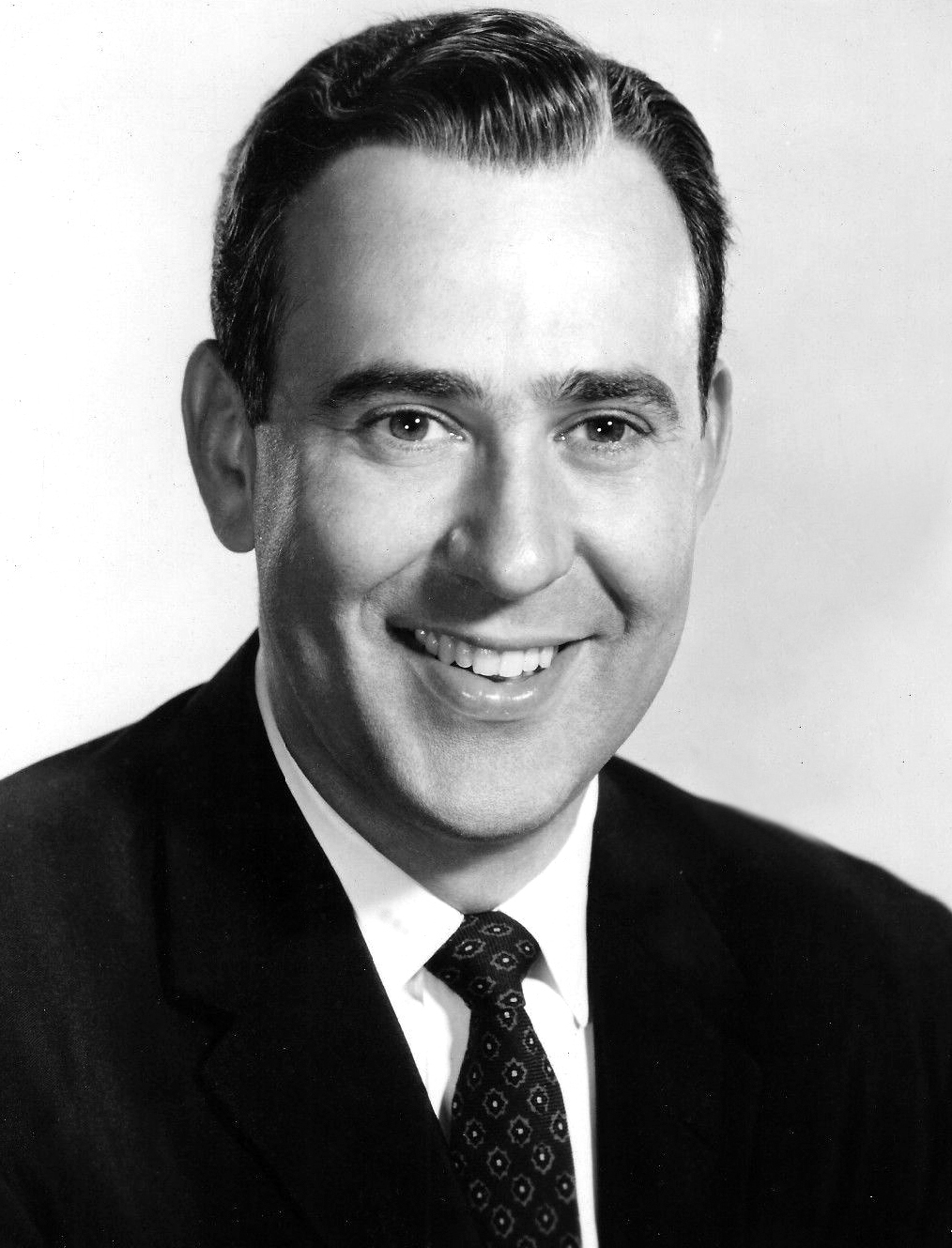
Carl Reiner, Best Continuing Supporting Performance by an Actor in a Dramatic or Comedy Series winner

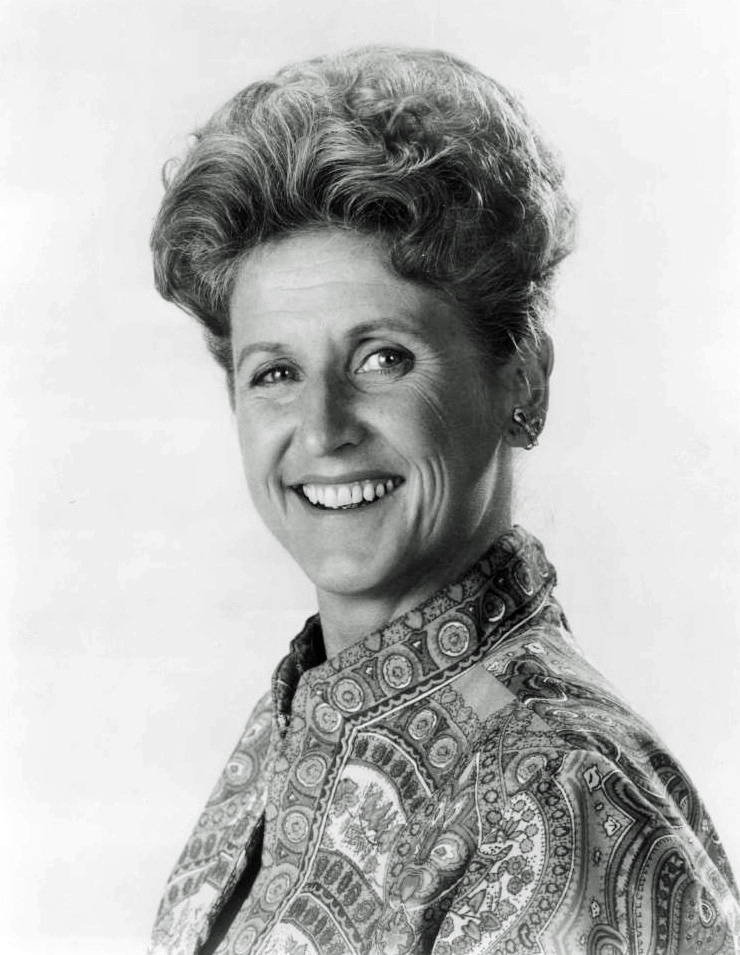
Ann B. Davis, Best Continuing Supporting Performance by an Actress in a Dramatic or Comedy Series winner

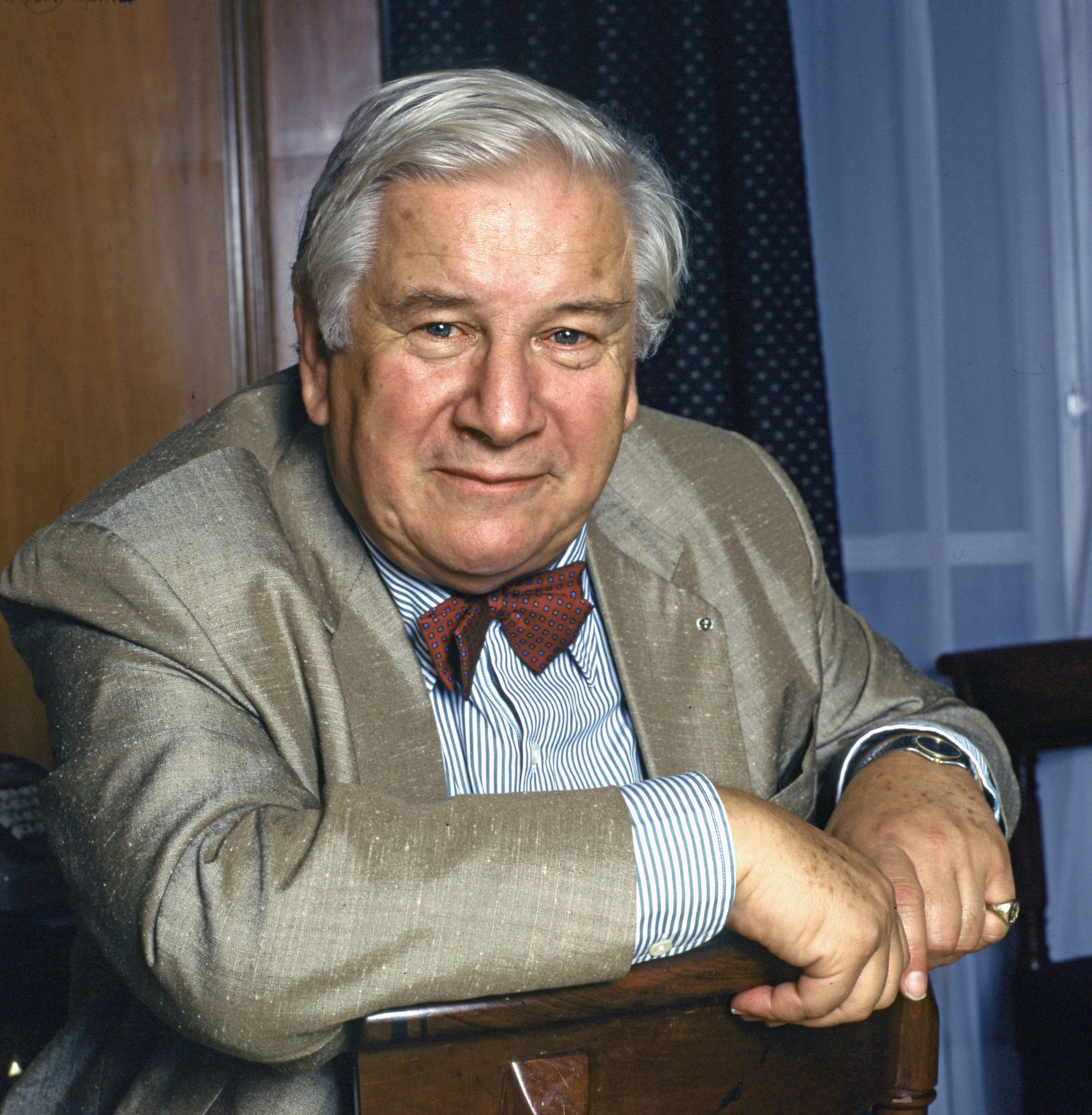
Peter Ustinov, Actor – Best Single Performance – Lead or Support winner

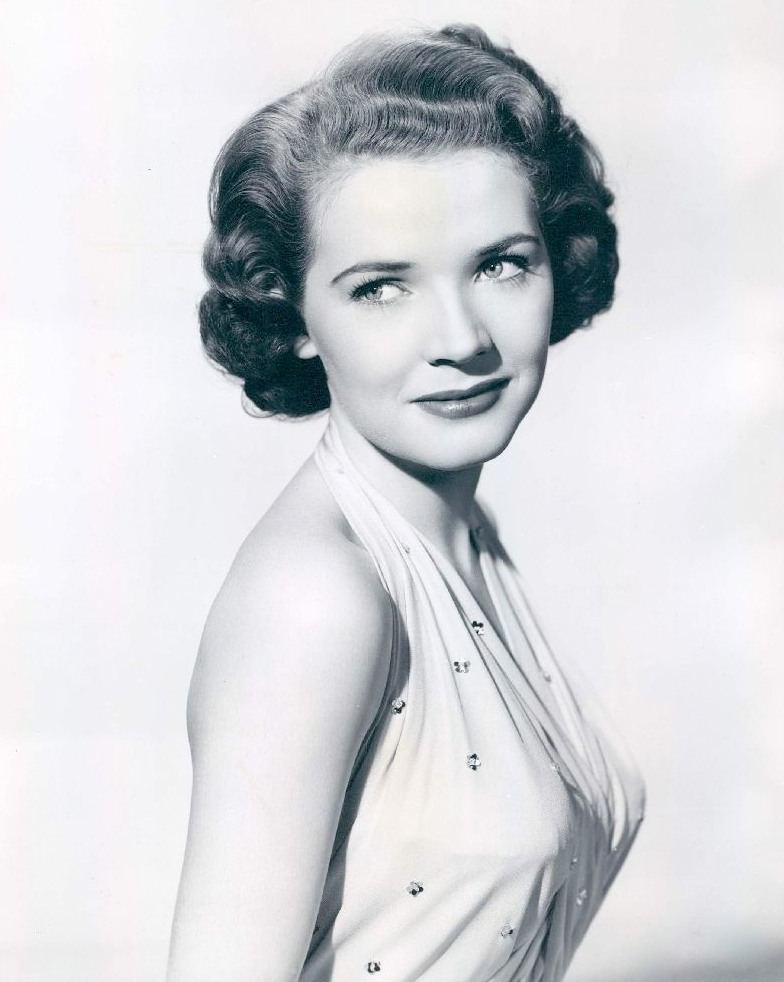
Polly Bergen, Actress – Best Single Performance – Lead or Support winner

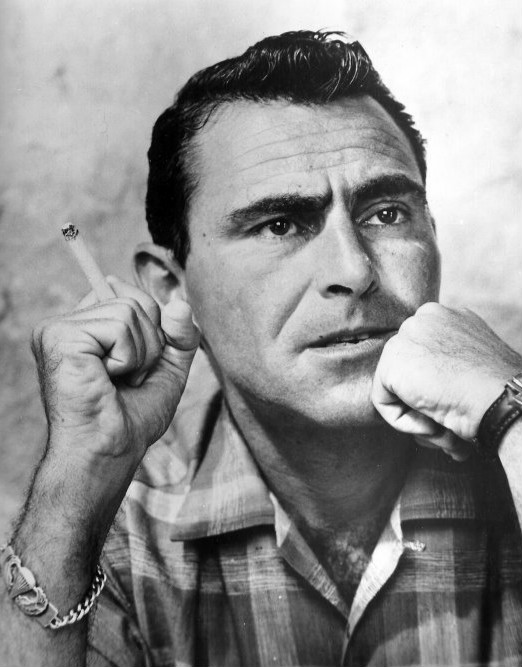
Rod Serling, Best Teleplay Writing, One Hour or More winner

Winners are listed first, highlighted in boldface, and indicated with a double dagger (‡).

=== Programs ===
Programs
**Best Comedy Series**: **The Phil Silvers Show (CBS)**‡; The Bob Cummings Show (CBS / NBC); Caesar's Hour (NBC); Father Knows Best (NBC); The Jack Benny Program (CBS)	**Best Dramatic Anthology Series**: **Playhouse 90 (CBS)**‡; Alfred Hitchcock Presents (CBS); Climax! (CBS); Hallmark Hall of Fame (NBC); Studio One (CBS)
**Best Dramatic Series with Continuing Characters**: **Gunsmoke (CBS)**‡; Lassie (CBS); Maverick (ABC); Perry Mason (CBS); Wagon Train (NBC)	**Best Musical, Variety, Audience Participation or Quiz Series**: **The Dinah Shore Chevy Show (NBC)**‡; The Ed Sullivan Show (CBS); The Perry Como Show (NBC); The Steve Allen Show (NBC); Tonight Starring Jack Paar (NBC)
**Best Public Service Program or Series**: **Omnibus (ABC / NBC)**‡; Bell Telephone Science Series (NBC); Person to Person (CBS); See It Now (CBS); Wide Wide World (NBC)	**Best New Program Series of the Year**: **The Seven Lively Arts (CBS)**‡; Leave It to Beaver (CBS); Maverick (ABC); Tonight Starring Jack Paar (NBC); Wagon Train (NBC)
**Best Single Program of the Year**: **Playhouse 90: "The Comedian" (CBS)**‡; The Edsel Show (CBS); General Motors 50th Anniversary Show (NBC); Hallmark Hall of Fame: "The Green Pastures" (NBC); Playhouse 90: "Helen Morgan" (CBS)

=== Acting ===
==== Lead performances ====
Lead performances
**Best Continuing Performance (Male) in a Series by a Comedian, Singer, Host, Dancer, M.C., Announcer, Narrator, Panelist, or any Person who Essentially Plays Himself**: **Jack Benny – The Jack Benny Program as Jack Benny (CBS)**‡; Steve Allen – The Steve Allen Show as himself (NBC); Sid Caesar – Caesar's Hour as himself (NBC); Perry Como – The Perry Como Show as himself (NBC); Jack Paar – Tonight Starring Jack Paar as himself (NBC)	**Best Continuing Performance (Female) in a Series by a Comedienne, Singer, Hostess, Dancer, M.C., Announcer, Narrator, Panelist, or any Person who Essentially Plays Herself**: **Dinah Shore – The Dinah Shore Chevy Show as herself (NBC)**‡; Gracie Allen – The George Burns and Gracie Allen Show as Gracie Allen (CBS); Lucille Ball – I Love Lucy as Lucy Ricardo (CBS); Dody Goodman – Tonight Starring Jack Paar as herself (NBC); Loretta Young – The Loretta Young Show as herself (NBC)
**Best Continuing Performance by an Actor in a Leading Role in a Dramatic or Comedy Series**: **Robert Young – Father Knows Best as Jim Anderson (NBC)**‡; James Arness – Gunsmoke as Marshal Matt Dillon (CBS); Bob Cummings – The Bob Cummings Show as Bob Collins (CBS / NBC); Phil Silvers – The Phil Silvers Show as MSgt. Ernest G. Bilko (CBS); Danny Thomas – The Danny Thomas Show as Danny Williams (ABC / CBS)	**Best Continuing Performance by an Actress in a Leading Role in a Dramatic or Comedy Series**: **Jane Wyatt – Father Knows Best as Margaret Anderson (NBC)**‡; Eve Arden – The Eve Arden Show as Liza Hammond (CBS); Spring Byington – December Bride as Lily Ruskin (CBS); Jan Clayton – Lassie as Ellen Miller (CBS); Ida Lupino – Mr. Adams and Eve as Eve Drake (CBS)

==== Supporting performances ====
Supporting performances
**Best Continuing Supporting Performance by an Actor in a Dramatic or Comedy Series**: **Carl Reiner – Caesar's Hour as various characters (NBC)**‡; Paul Ford – The Phil Silvers Show as Col. John T. Hall (CBS); William Frawley – I Love Lucy as Fred Mertz (CBS); Louis Nye – The Steve Allen Show as various characters (NBC); Dennis Weaver – Gunsmoke as Chester (CBS)	**Best Continuing Supporting Performance by an Actress in a Dramatic or Comedy Series**: **Ann B. Davis – The Bob Cummings Show as Charmaine Schultz (CBS / NBC)**‡; Pat Carroll – Caesar's Hour as Alice Brewster (NBC); Verna Felton – December Bride as Hilda Crocker (CBS); Marion Lorne – Sally as Myrtle Banford (CBS); Vivian Vance – I Love Lucy as Ethel Mertz (CBS)

==== Single performances ====
Single performances
**Actor – Best Single Performance – Lead or Support**: **Peter Ustinov – Omnibus: "The Life of Samuel Johnson" as Dr. Samuel Johnson (NBC)**‡; Lee J. Cobb – Studio One: "No Deadly Medicine" as Dr. Joseph Pearson (CBS); Mickey Rooney – Playhouse 90: "The Comedian" as Sammy Hogarth (CBS); David Wayne – Suspicion: "Heartbeat" as James Mennick (NBC); Ed Wynn – Hallmark Hall of Fame: "On Borrowed Time" as Gramps Northrup (CBS)	**Actress – Best Single Performance – Lead or Support**: **Polly Bergen – Playhouse 90: "Helen Morgan" as Helen Morgan (CBS)**‡; Julie Andrews – Cinderella as Cinderella (CBS); Helen Hayes – The Alcoa Hour: "Mrs. Gilling and the Skyscraper" as Mrs. Gilling (NBC); Piper Laurie – Studio One: "The Deaf Heart" as Ruth Cornelius (CBS); Teresa Wright – Playhouse 90: "The Miracle Worker" as Annie Sullivan (CBS)

=== Directing ===
Directing
**Best Direction, Half Hour or Less**: **Alfred Hitchcock Presents: "The Glass Eye" – Robert Stevens (CBS)**‡; The Danny Thomas Show – Sheldon Leonard (ABC / CBS); Father Knows Best – Peter Tewksbury (NBC); The Patrice Munsel Show – Clark Jones (ABC); Your Hit Parade – Bill Hobin (NBC)	**Best Direction, One Hour or More**: **The Dinah Shore Chevy Show – Bob Banner (NBC)**‡; Hallmark Hall of Fame – George Schaefer (NBC); Playhouse 90: "The Comedian" – John Frankenheimer (CBS); Playhouse 90: "Helen Morgan" – George Roy Hill (CBS); Playhouse 90: "The Miracle Worker" – Arthur Penn (CBS)

=== Writing ===
Writing
**Best Teleplay Writing, Half Hour or Less**: **Schlitz Playhouse of Stars: "The Lonely Wizard" – Paul Monash (CBS)**‡; Father Knows Best: "Margaret Hires a Gardener" – Roswell Rogers (NBC); Frontiers of Faith: "A Chassidic Tale" – Morton Wishengrad (NBC); Gunsmoke: "Born to Hang" – John Meston (CBS); Leave It to Beaver: "Beaver Gets 'Spelled" – Joe Connelly and Bob Mosher (CBS)	**Best Teleplay Writing, One Hour or More**: **Playhouse 90: "The Comedian" – Rod Serling (CBS)**‡; Hallmark Hall of Fame: "The Green Pastures" – Marc Connelly (NBC); Omnibus: "The Life of Samuel Johnson" – James Lee (NBC); Playhouse 90: "The Miracle Worker" – William Gibson (CBS); Studio One: "No Deadly Medicine" – Arthur Hailey (CBS)
**Best Comedy Writing**: **The Phil Silvers Show – Billy Friedberg, Nat Hiken, Coleman Jacoby, Arnold Rosen, A.J. Russell, Terry Ryan, Phil Sharp, Tony Webster and Sydney Zelinka (CBS)**‡; Caesar's Hour – Gary Belkin, Mel Brooks, Larry Gelbart, Sheldon Keller, Neil Simon, Michael Stewart, and Mel Tolkin (NBC); The Ernie Kovacs Show – Ernie Kovacs (NBC); Father Knows Best – Roswell Rogers and Paul West (NBC); The Jack Benny Program – George Balzer, Hal Goldman, Al Gordon, and Sam Perrin (CBS)

== Most major nominations ==
Networks with multiple major nominations (Note: "Major" constitutes the categories listed above: Program, Acting, Directing, and Writing. Does not include the technical categories.)
Network	Number of Nominations
CBS	57
NBC	43
ABC	6

Programs with multiple major nominations
Program	Category	Network	Number of Nominations
Playhouse 90	Drama	CBS	11
Father Knows Best	Comedy	NBC	6
Caesar's Hour	Comedy	NBC	5
Hallmark Hall of Fame	Drama	NBC	5
Gunsmoke	Drama	CBS	4
The Phil Silvers Show	Comedy	CBS	4
Studio One	Drama	CBS	4
Tonight Starring Jack Paar	Musical/Variety	NBC	4
The Bob Cummings Show	Comedy	CBS/NBC	3
The Dinah Shore Chevy Show	Musical/Variety	NBC	3
I Love Lucy	Comedy	CBS	3
The Jack Benny Program	Comedy	CBS	3
Omnibus	Public Service	NBC	3
The Steve Allen Show	Musical/Variety	NBC	3
Alfred Hitchcock Presents	Drama	CBS	2
The Danny Thomas Show	Comedy	CBS	2
December Bride	Comedy	CBS	2
Lassie	Drama	CBS	2
Leave It to Beaver	Comedy	CBS	2
Maverick	Drama	ABC	2
The Perry Como Show	Musical/Variety	NBC	2
Wagon Train	Drama	NBC	2

== Most major awards ==
Networks with multiple major awards
Network	Number of Awards
CBS	12
NBC	9

Programs with multiple major awards
Program	Category	Network	Number of Awards
Playhouse 90	Drama	CBS	4
The Dinah Shore Chevy Show	Musical/Variety	NBC	3
Father Knows Best	Comedy	NBC	2
Omnibus	Public Affairs	ABC/NBC	2
The Phil Silvers Show	Comedy	CBS	2
