= 9th Primetime Emmy Awards =

1957 American television programming awards

- Date: March 16, 1957
- Location: NBC Studios, Burbank, California
- Presented by: Academy of Television Arts and Sciences
- Hosted by: Desi Arnaz

Highlights
- Most awards: Caesar's Hour; Playhouse 90 (5)
- Most nominations: Playhouse 90 (11)
- Best Series - Half Hour or Less: The Phil Silvers Show
- Best Series - One Hour or More: Caesar's Hour
- Best New Program Series: Playhouse 90
- Best Public Service Series: See It Now
- Best Single Program of the Year: Playhouse 90: "Requiem for a Heavyweight"

Television/radio coverage
- Network: NBC

The 9th Emmy Awards, later referred to as the 9th Primetime Emmy Awards, were held on March 16, 1957, to honor the best in television of the year. The ceremony was held at the NBC Studios in Burbank, California. Desi Arnaz hosted the event. All nominations are listed, with winners in bold and series' networks are in parentheses. Categories were sorted based on running time, instead of by genre.

The top shows of the night were Caesar's Hour and Playhouse 90. Each show won a then-record five major awards, (however, two of Playhouse 90's wins came in now defunct categories).

Caesar's Hour became the first show to be nominated in all four major acting categories. Caesar's Hour also made history when it swept the four acting categories. For over fifty years, it remained the only show to win every major acting award. In 2004, the miniseries Angels in America became the second show, and first miniseries/television film, to sweep the acting field. In 2020, Schitt’s Creek became the first comedy or drama series to win in all four acting categories.

== Winners and nominees ==
Winners are listed first, highlighted in boldface, and indicated with a double dagger (‡).

=== Programs ===
Programs
**Best Series, Half Hour or Less**: **The Phil Silvers Show (CBS)**‡; Alfred Hitchcock Presents (CBS); Father Knows Best (NBC); The Jack Benny Program (CBS); Person to Person (CBS)	**Best Series, One Hour or More**: **Caesar's Hour (NBC)**‡; Climax! (CBS); The Ed Sullivan Show (CBS); Omnibus (CBS); The Perry Como Show (NBC)
**Best Live Camera Work**: **Kraft Television Theatre (NBC)**‡; Playhouse 90 (CBS); Producers' Showcase (NBC); Republican National Convention (ABC / CBS / NBC); Wide Wide World (NBC)	**Best Coverage of a Newsworthy Event**: **Years of Crisis (CBS)**‡; Andrea Doria Sinking (CBS); Andrea Doria Survivors Arrive in New York (CBS); National Political Conventions (ABC); National Political Conventions (NBC)
**Best Public Service Series**: **See It Now (CBS)**‡; Meet the Press (NBC); NBC Opera Theatre (NBC); Wide Wide World (NBC); You Are There (CBS)	**Best New Program Series**: **Playhouse 90 (CBS)**‡; Air Power (CBS); The Dinah Shore Chevy Show (NBC); The Ernie Kovacs Show (NBC); The Steve Allen Sunday Show (NBC)
**Best Single Program of the Year**: **Playhouse 90: "Requiem for a Heavyweight" (CBS)**‡; Kraft Television Theatre: "A Night to Remember" (NBC); Omnibus: "Leonard Bernstein" (CBS); See It Now: "Secret Life of Danny Kaye" (CBS); The Victor Borge Show (CBS)

=== Acting ===
==== Lead performances ====
Lead performances
**Best Continuing Performance by a Comedian in a Series**: **Sid Caesar – Caesar's Hour as various characters (NBC)**‡; Jack Benny – The Jack Benny Program as Jack Benny (CBS); Robert Cummings – The Bob Cummings Show as Bob Collins (CBS); Ernie Kovacs – The Ernie Kovacs Show as himself (NBC); Phil Silvers – The Phil Silvers Show as MSgt. Ernest G. Bilko (CBS)	**Best Continuing Performance by a Comedienne in a Series**: **Nanette Fabray – Caesar's Hour as various characters (NBC)**‡; Edie Adams – The Ernie Kovacs Show as herself (NBC); Gracie Allen – The George Burns and Gracie Allen Show as Gracie Allen (CBS); Lucille Ball – I Love Lucy as Lucy Ricardo (CBS); Ann Sothern – Private Secretary as Susie McNamara (CBS)
**Best Continuing Performance by an Actor in a Dramatic Series**: **Robert Young – Father Knows Best as Jim Anderson (NBC)**‡; James Arness – Gunsmoke as Marshal Matt Dillon (CBS); Charles Boyer – Four Star Playhouse as various characters (CBS); David Niven – Four Star Playhouse as various characters (CBS); Hugh O'Brian – The Life and Legend of Wyatt Earp as Wyatt Earp (ABC)	**Best Continuing Performance by an Actress in a Dramatic Series**: **Loretta Young – The Loretta Young Show as herself (NBC)**‡; Jan Clayton – Lassie as Ellen Miller (CBS); Ida Lupino – Four Star Playhouse as various characters (CBS); Peggy Wood – Mama as Mama (CBS); Jane Wyman – Jane Wyman Theatre as herself (NBC)

==== Supporting performances ====
Supporting performances
**Best Supporting Performance by an Actor**: **Carl Reiner – Caesar's Hour as various characters (NBC)**‡; Art Carney – The Jackie Gleason Show as Ed Norton (CBS); Paul Ford – The Phil Silvers Show as Col. John T. Hall (CBS); William Frawley – I Love Lucy as Fred Mertz (CBS); Ed Wynn – Playhouse 90: "Requiem for a Heavyweight" as Army (CBS)	**Best Supporting Performance by an Actress**: **Pat Carroll – Caesar's Hour as various characters (NBC)**‡; Ann B. Davis – The Bob Cummings Show as Charmaine Schultz (CBS); Audrey Meadows – The Jackie Gleason Show as Alice Kramden (CBS); Mildred Natwick – Ford Star Jubilee: "Blithe Spirit" as Madame Arcati (CBS); Vivian Vance – I Love Lucy as Ethel Mertz (CBS)

==== Single performances ====
Single performances
**Best Single Performance by an Actor**: **Jack Palance – Playhouse 90: "Requiem for a Heavyweight" as Harlan "Mountain" McClintock (CBS)**‡; Lloyd Bridges – Alcoa-Goodyear Playhouse: "Tragedy in a Temporary Town" as Alec Beggs (NBC); Fredric March – Producers' Showcase: "Dodsworth" as Sam Dodsworth (NBC); Sal Mineo – Studio One: "Dino" as Dino Minetta (CBS); Red Skelton – Playhouse 90: "The Big Slide" as Buddy McCoy (CBS)	**Best Single Performance by an Actress**: **Claire Trevor – Producers' Showcase: "Dodsworth" as Fran Dodsworth (NBC)**‡; Edna Best – Ford Star Jubilee: "This Happy Breed" as Ethel Gibbons (CBS); Gracie Fields – The United States Steel Hour: "The Old Lady Shows Her Medals" as Sarah Dowey (CBS); Nancy Kelly – Studio One: "The Pilot" as Sister M. Aquinas (CBS); Evelyn Rudie – Playhouse 90: "Eloise" as Eloise (CBS)

=== Directing ===
Directing
**Best Direction, Half Hour or Less**: **The Danny Thomas Show: "Danny's Comeback" – Sheldon Leonard (ABC)**‡; Camera Three: "As I Lay Dying" – Clay Yurdin (CBS); G.E. Theatre: "The Road That Led Afar" – Herschel Daugherty (CBS); Tales of the 77th Bengal Lancers: "The Traitor" – George Archainbaud (NBC); You Are There: "The First Moscow Purge Trial" – William Russell (CBS)	**Best Direction, One Hour or More**: **Playhouse 90: "Requiem for a Heavyweight" – Ralph Nelson (CBS)**‡; The 20th Century Fox Hour: "Child of the Regiment" – Lewis Allen (CBS); The Dinah Shore Chevy Show: "Frank Sinatra" – Bob Banner (NBC); Kraft Television Theatre: "A Night to Remember" – George Roy Hill (NBC); NBC Opera Theatre: "La Boheme" – Kirk Browning (NBC); Playhouse 90: "Forbidden Area"– John Frankenheimer (CBS)

=== Writing ===
Writing
**Best Teleplay Writing, Half Hour or Less**: **Alfred Hitchcock Presents: "Fog Closing In" – James P. Cavanagh (CBS)**‡; Frontier: "Patrol" – Morton Fine and David Friedkin (NBC); The Life and Legend of Wyatt Earp: "The Buntime" – Dan Ullman (ABC); The Loretta Young Show: "The Pearl" – Richard Morris (NBC); Telephone Time: "Man with the Beard" – John Nesbitt (ABC)	**Best Teleplay Writing, One Hour or More**: **Playhouse 90: "Requiem for a Heavyweight" – Rod Serling (CBS)**‡; Alcoa-Goodyear Playhouse: "Joey" – Louis Peterson (NBC); Alcoa-Goodyear Playhouse: "Tragedy in a Temporary Town" – Reginald Rose (NBC); Kraft Television Theatre: "A Night to Remember" – George Roy Hill and John Whedon (NBC); Playhouse 90: "Sizeman and Son" – Elick Moll (CBS)
**Best Comedy Writing - Variety or Situation Comedy**: **The Phil Silvers Show – Billy Friedberg, Nat Hiken, Coleman Jacoby, Arnold Rosen, Leonard Stern and Tony Webster (CBS)**‡; Caesar's Hour – Gary Belkin, Mel Brooks, Larry Gelbart, Sheldon Keller, Neil Simon, Michael Stewart and Mel Tolkin (NBC); The Ernie Kovacs Show – Louis M. Heyward, Ernie Kovacs, Rex Lardner and Mike Marmer (NBC); The Jack Benny Program – George Balzer, Hal Goldman, Al Gordon and Sam Perrin (CBS); The Perry Como Show – Goodman Ace, Jay Burton, Mort Green and George Foster (NBC)

== Most major nominations ==
Networks with multiple major nominations (Note: "Major" constitutes the categories listed above: Program, Acting, Directing, and Writing. Does not include the technical categories.)
Network	Number of Nominations
CBS	59
NBC	41
ABC	6

Programs with multiple major nominations
Program	Network	Number of Nominations
Playhouse 90	CBS	11
Caesar's Hour	NBC	6
The Ernie Kovacs Show	NBC	4
Kraft Television Theatre	NBC	4
The Phil Silvers Show	CBS	4
Alcoa-Goodyear Playhouse	NBC	3
Four Star Playhouse	CBS	3
I Love Lucy	CBS	3
The Jack Benny Program	CBS	3
Producers' Showcase	NBC	3
Alfred Hitchcock Presents	CBS	2
The Bob Cummings Show	NBC	2
The Dinah Shore Chevy Show	NBC	2
Father Knows Best	NBC	2
Ford Star Jubilee	CBS	2
The Jackie Gleason Show	CBS	2
The Life and Legend of Wyatt Earp	ABC	2
The Loretta Young Show	NBC	2
NBC Opera Theatre	NBC	2
Omnibus	CBS	2
The Perry Como Show	NBC	2
See It Now	CBS	2
Studio One	CBS	2
Wide Wide World	NBC	2
You Are There	CBS	2

== Most major awards ==
Networks with multiple major awards
Network	Number of Awards
CBS	11
NBC	8

Programs with multiple major awards
Program	Network	Number of Awards
Caesar's Hour	NBC	5
Playhouse 90	CBS	5
The Phil Silvers Show	CBS	2
