= Primetime Emmy Award for Outstanding Writing for a Comedy Series =

Award for comedy series writing

- Awarded for: Outstanding Writing for a Comedy Series
- Country: United States
- Presented by: Academy of Television Arts & Sciences
- First award: 1955
- Currently held by: Katie Dippold; Widow's Bay (2026)
- Website: emmys.com

The Primetime Emmy Award for Outstanding Writing for a Comedy Series is an annual award presented as part of the Primetime Emmy Awards. It recognizes writing excellence in regular comedic series, most of which can generally be described as situation comedies. (Note: In 1969 and 1970, the nominees for the comedy writing award were variety programs.) It was first presented in 1955 as Outstanding Written Comedy Material.

== Winners and nominations ==
=== 1950s ===
Year	Program	Episode	Nominee(s)	Network
Best Written Comedy Material
1955	The George Gobel Show		James B. Allardice, Jack Douglas, Hal Kanter and Harry Winkler	NBC
1955	I Love Lucy		Jess Oppenheimer, Madelyn Pugh and Bob Carroll Jr.	CBS
1955	The Jack Benny Show		George Balzer, Milt Josefsberg, Sam Perrin and John Tackaberry	CBS
1955	The Jackie Gleason Show		Jackie Gleason and staff writers	CBS
1955	Make Room for Daddy		Danny Thomas and staff writers	ABC
1955	Mister Peepers		Jim Fritzell and Everett Greenbaum	NBC
Best Comedy Writing
1956	The Phil Silvers Show		Arnold M. Auerbach, Barry Blitzer, Vincent Bogert, Nat Hiken, Coleman Jacoby, Harvey Orkin, Arnold Rosen, Terry Ryan and Tony Webster	CBS
1956	Caesar's Hour		Mel Brooks, Selma Diamond, Larry Gelbart, Sheldon Keller and Mel Tolkin	NBC
1956	The George Gobel Show		Everett Greenbaum, Hal Kanter, Howard Leeds and Harry Winkler	NBC
1956	I Love Lucy		Jess Oppenheimer, Madelyn Pugh, Bob Carroll Jr., Bob Schiller and Bob Weiskopf	CBS
1956	The Jack Benny Show		George Balzer, Hal Goldman, Al Gordon and Sam Perrin	CBS
Best Comedy Writing - Variety or Situation Comedy
1957	The Phil Silvers Show		Billy Friedberg, Nat Hiken, Coleman Jacoby, Arnold Rosen, Leonard B. Stern and Tony Webster	CBS
1957	Caesar's Hour		Gary Belkin, Mel Brooks, Larry Gelbart, Sheldon Keller, Neil Simon and Michael Stewart and Mel Tolkin	NBC
1957	The Ernie Kovacs Show		Louis M. Heyward, Ernie Kovacs, Rex Lardner and Mike Marmer	NBC
1957	The Jack Benny Show		George Balzer, Hal Goldman, Al Gordon and Sam Perrin	CBS
1957	The Perry Como Show		Goodman Ace, Jay Burton, George Foster and Mort Green	NBC
Best Comedy Writing
1958	The Phil Silvers Show		Billy Friedberg, Nat Hiken, Coleman Jacoby, Arnold Rosen, A.J. Russell, Terry Ryan, Phil Sharp, Tony Webster and Sydney Zelinka	CBS
1958	Caesar's Hour		Gary Belkin, Mel Brooks, Larry Gelbart, Sheldon Keller, Neil Simon and Michael Stewart and Mel Tolkin	NBC
1958	The Ernie Kovacs Show	"No Dialogue Show"	Ernie Kovacs	NBC
1958	Father Knows Best		Roswell Rogers and Paul West	NBC
1958	The Jack Benny Show		George Balzer, Hal Goldman, Al Gordon and Sam Perrin	CBS
Best Writing of a Single Program of a Comedy Series
1959	The Jack Benny Show	"Ernie Kovacs"	George Balzer, Hal Goldman, Al Gordon and Sam Perrin	CBS
1959	The Bob Cummings Show	"Grandpa Clobbers the Air Force"	Paul Henning and Dick Wesson	NBC
1959	Father Knows Best	"Medal for Margaret"	Roswell Rogers	CBS
1959	The Phil Silvers Show	"Bilko's Vampire"	Billy Friedberg, Coleman Jacoby and Arnie Rosen	CBS
1959	The Real McCoys	"Once There Was a Traveling Saleswoman"	Bill Manhoff	ABC

=== 1960s ===
Year	Program	Episode	Nominee(s)	Network
Outstanding Writing Achievement in Comedy
1960	The Jack Benny Show		George Balzer, Hal Goldman, Al Gordon and Sam Perrin	CBS
1960	The Ballad of Louie the Louse		Nat Hiken	CBS
1960	Father Knows Best		Dorothy Cooper and Roswell Rogers	CBS
1961	The Red Skelton Show		Dave O'Brien, Martin Ragaway, Al Schwartz, Sherwood Schwartz and Red Skelton	CBS
1961	The Danny Thomas Show		Jack Elinson and Charles Stewart	CBS
1961	Hennesey		Richard Baer	CBS
1962	The Dick Van Dyke Show		Carl Reiner	CBS
1962	The Bob Newhart Show		Ernest Chambers, Dean Hargrove, Don Hinkley, Robert Kaufman, Roland Kibbee, Norm Liebman, Bob Newhart, Milt Rosen, Charles Sherman, Larry Siegel and Howard Snyder	NBC
1962	Car 54, Where Are You?		Nat Hiken, Terry Ryan and Tony Webster	NBC
1962	Chun King Chow Mein Hour		Stan Freberg	ABC
1962	The Red Skelton Show		Dave O'Brien, Arthur Phillips, Martin Ragaway, Al Schwartz, Sherwood Schwartz, Ed Simmons and Red Skelton	CBS
1963	The Dick Van Dyke Show		Carl Reiner	CBS
1963	The Beverly Hillbillies		Paul Henning	CBS
1963	Car 54, Where Are You?		Nat Hiken	NBC
1963	The Jack Benny Show		George Balzer, Hal Goldman, Al Gordon and Sam Perrin	CBS
1963	The Red Skelton Show		Mort Greene, Bruce Howard, Rick Mittleman, Dave O'Brien, Arthur Phillips, Martin A. Ragaway, Larry Rhine, Ed Simmons, Red Skelton and Hugh Wedlock	CBS
Outstanding Writing Achievement in Comedy or Variety
1964	The Dick Van Dyke Show		Carl Reiner, Bill Persky and Sam Denoff	CBS
1964	The Danny Kaye Show		Herbert Baker, Gary Belkin, Ernest Chambers, Larry Gelbart, Saul Ilson, Sheldon Keller, Paul Mazursky, Mel Tolkin and Larry Tucker	CBS
1964	The Farmer's Daughter		Steven Gethers, Jerry Davis, Lee Loeb and John McGreevey	ABC
1964	That Was the Week That Was		Robert Emmett, Gerald Gardner, Thomas Meehan, David Panich, Ed Sherman, Saul Turteltaub and Tony Webster	NBC
Outstanding Individual Achievements in Entertainment – Writers
1965 (Note: The 17th Primetime Emmy Awards did not have genre-specific categories.)	The Defenders	"The 700 Year Old Gang"	David Karp	CBS
1965	The Danny Thomas Hour	The Wonderful World of Burlesque	Coleman Jacoby and Arnie Rosen	NBC
1965	The Dick Van Dyke Show	"Never Bathe on Saturday"	Carl Reiner	CBS
1965	Hallmark Hall of Fame	"The Magnificent Yankee"	Robert Hartung	NBC
1965	That Was the Week That Was		William Boardman, Dee Caruso, Robert Emmett, David Frost, Gerald Gardner, Buck Henry, Joseph Hurley, Thomas Meehan, Herbert Sargent, Larry Siegel, Gloria Steinem, Jim Stevenson, Calvin Trillin and Saul Turteltaub	NBC
Outstanding Writing Achievement in Comedy
1966	The Dick Van Dyke Show	"Coast to Coast Big Mouth"	Bill Persky and Sam Denoff	CBS
1966	The Dick Van Dyke Show	"The Ugliest Dog in the World"	Bill Persky and Sam Denoff	CBS
1966	Get Smart	"Mr. Big"	Mel Brooks and Buck Henry	NBC
1967	Get Smart	"Ship of Spies"	Buck Henry and Leonard B. Stern	NBC
1967	Family Affair	"Buffy"	Edmund Hartmann	CBS
1967	I Dream of Jeannie	"The Lady in the Bottle"	Sidney Sheldon	NBC
1968	He & She	"The Coming-Out Party"	Chris Hayward and Allan Burns	CBS
1968	He & She	"The Old Man and the She"	Leonard Stern and Arne Sultan	CBS
1968	The Lucy Show	"Lucy Gets Jack Benny's Account"	Milt Josefsberg and Ray Singer	CBS
1968	That Girl	"The Mailman Cometh"	Danny Arnold and Ruth Brooks Flippen	ABC
Outstanding Writing Achievement in Comedy, Variety or Music
1969	The Smothers Brothers Comedy Hour	"February 16, 1969"	Allan Blye, Bob Einstein, Carl Gottlieb, Cy Howard, Steve Martin, Lorenzo Music, Murray Roman, Cecil Tuck, Paul Wayne and Mason Williams	CBS
1969	The Carol Burnett Show	"November 11, 1968"	Bill Angelos, Stan Burns, Hal Goldman, Al Gordon, Don Hinkley, Buz Kohan, Mike Marmer, Gail Parent, Arnie Rosen and Kenny Solms	CBS
1969	Rowan & Martin's Laugh-In	"February 3, 1969"	Chris Bearde, Jim Carlson, David M. Cox, Phil Hahn, Jack Hanrahan, Coslough Johnson, Paul Keyes, Marc London, Allan Manings, Jack Mendelsohn, Lorne Michaels, James Mulligan, Hart Pomerantz, David Panich and Hugh Wedlock Jr.	NBC

=== 1970s ===
Year	Program	Episode	Nominee(s)	Network
Outstanding Writing Achievement in Comedy, Variety or Music
1970	Annie, the Women in the Life of a Man		Thomas Meehan, Peter Bellwood, Herb Sargent, Judith Viorst and Gary Belkin	CBS
1970	Rowan & Martin's Laugh-In	"November 3, 1969"	Jim Carlson, John Carsey, Jack Douglas, Gene Farmer, Coslough Johnson, Paul Keyes, Jeremy Lloyd, Marc London, Allan Manings, Jim Mulligan, David Panich, John Rappaport and Stephen Spears	NBC
1970	Rowan & Martin's Laugh-In	"December 20, 1969"	Jim Abell, Jim Carlson, John Carsey, Jack Douglas, Chet Dowling, Gene Farmer, Coslough Johnson, Jeremy Lloyd, Marc London, Allan Manings, Jim Mulligan, David Panich, John Rappaport, Stephen Spears and Barry Took	NBC
Outstanding Writing Achievement in Comedy
1971	The Mary Tyler Moore Show	"Support Your Local Mother"	Allan Burns and James L. Brooks	CBS
1971	All in the Family	"Meet the Bunkers"	Norman Lear	CBS
1971	All in the Family	"Oh My Aching Back"	Stanley Ralph Ross	CBS
1971	Here's Lucy	"Lucy Meets the Burtons"	Bob Carroll Jr. and Madelyn Pugh	CBS
1972	All in the Family	"Edith's Problem"	Burt Styler	CBS
1972	All in the Family	"Mike's Problem"	Story by : Alan J. Levitt; Teleplay by : Alan J. Levitt and Phil Mishkin	CBS
1972	All in the Family	"The Saga of Cousin Oscar"	Story by : Burt Styler; Teleplay by : Burt Styler and Norman Lear	CBS
1973	All in the Family	"The Bunkers and the Swingers"	Michael Ross, Bernie West and Lee Kalcheim	CBS
1973	M*A*S*H	"Pilot"	Larry Gelbart	CBS
1973	The Mary Tyler Moore Show	"The Good-Time News"	Allan Burns and James L. Brooks	CBS
Best Writing in Comedy
1974	The Mary Tyler Moore Show	"The Lou and Edie Story"	Treva Silverman	CBS
1974	M*A*S*H	"Hot Lips and Empty Arms"	Linda Bloodworth-Thomason and Mary Kay Place	CBS
1974	M*A*S*H	"The Trial of Henry Blake"	McLean Stevenson	CBS
Outstanding Writing in a Comedy Series
1975	The Mary Tyler Moore Show	"Will Mary Richards Go to Jail?"	Stan Daniels and Ed. Weinberger	CBS
1975	The Mary Tyler Moore Show	"Lou and That Woman"	David Lloyd	CBS
1975	Rhoda	"Rhoda's Wedding"	James L. Brooks, Allan Burns, David Davis, Lorenzo Music, Norman Barasch, Carroll Moore and David Lloyd	CBS
1976	The Mary Tyler Moore Show	"Chuckles Bites the Dust"	David Lloyd	CBS
1976	Barney Miller	"The Hero"	Danny Arnold and Chris Hayward	ABC
1976	M*A*S*H	"Hawkeye"	Larry Gelbart and Simon Muntner	CBS
1976	M*A*S*H	"The More I See You"	Larry Gelbart and Gene Reynolds	CBS
1976	Maude	"The Analyst"	Jay Folb	CBS
1977	The Mary Tyler Moore Show	"The Last Show"	James L. Brooks, Allan Burns, Ed. Weinberger, Stan Daniels, David Lloyd and Bob Ellison	CBS
1977	Barney Miller	"Quarantine, Part 2"	Tony Sheehan and Danny Arnold	ABC
1977	M*A*S*H	"Dear Sigmund"	Alan Alda	CBS
1977	The Mary Tyler Moore Show	"Mary Midwife"	David Lloyd	CBS
1977	The Mary Tyler Moore Show	"Ted's Change of Heart"	Earl Pomerantz	CBS
1978	All in the Family	"Cousin Liz"	Story by : Barry Harman and Harve Brosten; Teleplay by : Bob Schiller and Bob Weiskopf	CBS
1978	All in the Family	"Edith's Crisis of Faith, Part 2"	Story by : Erik Tarloff; Teleplay by : Erik Tarloff, Mel Tolkin and Larry Rhine	CBS
1978	All in the Family	"Edith's 50th Birthday"	Bob Schiller and Bob Weiskopf	CBS
1978	M*A*S*H	"Fallen Idol"	Alan Alda	CBS
Outstanding Writing in a Comedy or Comedy-Variety or Music Series
1979	M*A*S*H	"Inga"	Alan Alda	CBS
1979	All in the Family	"California, Here We Are, Part 2"	Milt Josefsberg, Phil Sharp, Bob Schiller and Bob Weiskopf	CBS
1979	M*A*S*H	"Point of View"	Ken Levine and David Isaacs	CBS
1979	Saturday Night Live	"Host: Richard Benjamin"	Dan Aykroyd, Anne Beatts, Tom Davis, James Downey, Brian Doyle-Murray, Al Franken, Brian McConnachie, Lorne Michaels, Don Novello, Herbert Sargent, Tom Schiller, Rosie Shuster, Walter Williams and Alan Zweibel	NBC
1979	Taxi	"Blind Date"	Michael J. Leeson	ABC

=== 1980s ===
Year	Program	Episode	Nominee(s)	Network
1980	Barney Miller	"The Photographer"	Bob Colleary	ABC
1980	The Associates	"The Censors"	Stan Daniels and Ed. Weinberger	ABC
1980	The Associates	"The First Day"	Story by : Charlie Hauck; Teleplay by : Michael J. Leeson	ABC
1980	M*A*S*H	"Goodbye Radar, Part 2"	Ken Levine and David Isaacs	CBS
1980	Taxi	"Honor Thy Father"	Glen and Les Charles	ABC
1981	Taxi	"Tony's Sister and Jim"	Michael J. Leeson	ABC
1981	The Greatest American Hero	"Pilot"	Stephen J. Cannell	ABC
1981	M*A*S*H	"Death Takes a Holiday"	Story by : Burt Metcalfe, Thad Mumford and Dan Wilcox; Teleplay by : Mike Farrell, John Rappaport and Dennis Koenig	CBS
1981	Taxi	"Going Home"	Glen and Les Charles	ABC
1981	Taxi	"Elaine's Strange Triangle"	David Lloyd	ABC
1982	Taxi	"Elegant Iggy"	Ken Estin	ABC
1982	Barney Miller	"Landmark, Part 3"	Frank Dungan, Jeff Stein and Tony Sheehan	ABC
1982	M*A*S*H	"Follies of the Living, Concerns of the Dead"	Alan Alda	CBS
1982	Police Squad!	"A Substantial Gift (The Broken Promise)"	Jim Abrahams, David Zucker and Jerry Zucker	ABC
1982	Taxi	"Jim the Psychic"	Story by : Holly Holmberg Brooks; Teleplay by : Barry Kemp	ABC
1983	Cheers	"Give Me a Ring Sometime"	Glen and Les Charles	NBC
1983	Buffalo Bill	"Pilot"	Tom Patchett and Jay Tarses	NBC
1983	Cheers	"The Boys in the Bar"	Ken Levine and David Isaacs	NBC
1983	Cheers	"Diane's Perfect Date"	David Lloyd	NBC
1983	Taxi	"Jim's Inheritance"	Ken Estin	NBC
1984	Cheers	"Old Flames"	David Angell	NBC
1984	Buffalo Bill	"Wilkinson's Sword"	Tom Patchett	NBC
1984	Buffalo Bill	"Jo-Jo's Problem, Part 2"	Jay Tarses	NBC
1984	Cheers	"Homicidal Ham"	David Lloyd	NBC
1984	Cheers	"Power Play"	Glen and Les Charles	NBC
1985	The Cosby Show	"Pilot"	Ed. Weinberger and Michael J. Leeson	NBC
1985	Cheers	"I Call Your Name"	Peter Casey and David Lee	NBC
1985	Cheers	"Rebound, Part 2"	Glen and Les Charles	NBC
1985	Cheers	"Sam Turns the Other Cheek"	David Lloyd	NBC
1985	The Cosby Show	"Goodbye Mr. Fish"	Earl Pomerantz	NBC
1986	The Golden Girls	"A Little Romance"	Mort Nathan and Barry Fanaro	NBC
1986	Cheers	"2 Good 2 Be 4 Real"	Peter Casey and David Lee	NBC
1986	The Cosby Show	"Denise's Friend"	John Markus	NBC
1986	The Cosby Show	"Theo's Holiday"	John Markus, Carmen Finestra and Matt Williams	NBC
1986	Family Ties	"The Real Thing, Part 2"	Michael J. Weithorn	NBC
1986	The Golden Girls	"Pilot"	Susan Harris	NBC
1987	Family Ties	"A, My Name is Alex"	Gary David Goldberg and Alan Uger	NBC
1987	Cheers	"Abnormal Psychology"	Janet Leahy	NBC
1987	The Days and Nights of Molly Dodd	"Here's Why Cosmetics Should Come in Unbreakable Bottles"	Jay Tarses	NBC
1987	The Golden Girls	"Isn't it Romantic?"	Jeffrey Duteil	NBC
1987	Newhart	"Co-Hostess Twinkie"	David Mirkin	CBS
1988	Frank's Place	"The Bridge"	Hugh Wilson	CBS
1988	Cheers	"Home Is the Sailor"	Glen and Les Charles	NBC
1988	Designing Women	"Killing All the Right People"	Linda Bloodworth-Thomason	CBS
1988	It's Garry Shandling's Show	"It's Garry and Angelica's Show, Part 2"	Sam Simon, Tom Gammill and Max Pross	Showtime
1988	It's Garry Shandling's Show	"No Baby, No Show"	Alan Zweibel and Garry Shandling	Showtime
1988	The Wonder Years	"Pilot"	Neal Marlens and Carol L. Black	ABC
1989	Murphy Brown	"Respect"	Diane English	CBS
1989	The Wonder Years	"Pottery Will Get You Nowhere"	Matthew Carlson	ABC
1989	The Wonder Years	"Coda"	Todd W. Langen	ABC
1989	The Wonder Years	"Loosiers"	David M. Stern	ABC
1989	The Wonder Years	"Our Miss White"	Michael J. Weithorn	ABC

=== 1990s ===
Year	Program	Episode	Nominee(s)	Network
1990	The Wonder Years	"Good-bye"	Bob Brush	ABC
1990	Cheers	"Death Takes a Holiday on Ice"	Ken Levine and David Isaacs	NBC
1990	The Famous Teddy Z	"Pilot"	Hugh Wilson	CBS
1990	Murphy Brown	"Brown Like Me"	Diane English	CBS
1990	Newhart	"The Last Newhart"	Mark Egan, Mark Solomon and Bob Bendetson	CBS
1991	Murphy Brown	"Jingle Hell, Jingle Hell, Jingle All the Way"	Gary Dontzig and Steven Peterman	CBS
1991	The Days and Nights of Molly Dodd	"Here's a Little Touch of Harry in the Night"	Jay Tarses	Lifetime
1991	Murphy Brown	"On Another Plane"	Diane English	CBS
1991	Seinfeld	"The Deal"	Larry David	NBC
1991	Seinfeld	"The Pony Remark"	Larry David and Jerry Seinfeld	NBC
1992	Seinfeld	"The Fix-Up"	Elaine Pope and Larry Charles	NBC
1992	Murphy Brown	"Come Out, Come Out, Wherever You Are"	Gary Dontzig and Steven Peterman	CBS
1992	Murphy Brown	"Uh-Oh, Part 2"	Story by : Diane English and Korby Siamis; Teleplay by : Diane English	CBS
1992	Roseanne	"A Bitter Pill to Swallow"	Amy Sherman and Jennifer Heath	ABC
1992	Seinfeld	"The Parking Garage"	Larry David	NBC
1992	Seinfeld	"The Tape"	Larry David, Bob Shaw and Don McEnery	NBC
1993	Seinfeld	"The Contest"	Larry David	NBC
1993	Dream On	"For Peter's Sake"	David Crane and Marta Kauffman	HBO
1993	The Larry Sanders Show	"The Hey Now Episode"	Garry Shandling and Dennis Klein	HBO
1993	The Larry Sanders Show	"The Spider Episode"	Garry Shandling, Rosie Shuster, Paul Simms and Peter Tolan	HBO
1993	Seinfeld	"The Outing"	Larry Charles	NBC
1994	Frasier	"The Good Son"	David Angell, Peter Casey and David Lee	NBC
1994	Frasier	"The Show Where Lilith Comes Back"	Ken Levine and David Isaacs	NBC
1994	The Larry Sanders Show	"Larry's Agent"	Story by : Victor Levin; Teleplay by : Garry Shandling, Paul Simms, Maya Forbes and Drake Sather	HBO
1994	Seinfeld	"The Mango"	Story by : Lawrence H. Levy; Teleplay by : Lawrence H. Levy and Larry David	NBC
1994	Seinfeld	"The Puffy Shirt"	Larry David	NBC
1995	Frasier	"An Affair to Forget"	Chuck Ranberg and Anne Flett-Giordano	NBC
1995	Frasier	"The Matchmaker"	Joe Keenan	NBC
1995	Friends	"The One Where Underdog Gets Away"	Jeff Greenstein and Jeff Strauss	NBC
1995	The Larry Sanders Show	"Hank's Night in the Sun"	Peter Tolan	HBO
1995	The Larry Sanders Show	"The Mr. Sharon Stone Show"	Garry Shandling and Peter Tolan	HBO
1996	Frasier	"Moon Dance"	Joe Keenan, Christopher Lloyd, Rob Greenberg, Jack Burditt, Chuck Ranberg, Anne Flett-Giordano, Linda Morris and Vic Rauseo	NBC
1996	The Larry Sanders Show	"Arthur After Hours"	Peter Tolan	HBO
1996	The Larry Sanders Show	"Hank's Sex Tape"	Jon Vitti	HBO
1996	The Larry Sanders Show	"Roseanne's Return"	Story by : Garry Shandling; Teleplay by : Maya Forbes and Steven Levitan	HBO
1996	Seinfeld	"The Soup Nazi"	Spike Feresten	NBC
1997	Ellen	"The Puppy Episode"	Story by : Ellen DeGeneres; Teleplay by : Mark Driscoll, Dava Savel, Tracy Newman and Jonathan Stark	ABC
1997	The Larry Sanders Show	"Ellen, or Isn't She?"	Story by : Garry Shandling, Judd Apatow and John Markus; Teleplay by : Judd Apatow and John Markus	HBO
1997	The Larry Sanders Show	"Everybody Loves Larry"	Jon Vitti	HBO
1997	The Larry Sanders Show	"My Name is Asher Kingsley"	Peter Tolan	HBO
1997	Seinfeld	"The Yada Yada"	Peter Mehlman and Jill Franklyn	NBC
1998	The Larry Sanders Show	"Flip"	Peter Tolan and Garry Shandling	HBO
1998	Ally McBeal	"Theme of Life"	David E. Kelley	Fox
1998	Ellen	"Emma"	Lawrence Broch	ABC
1998	Frasier	"The Ski Lodge"	Joe Keenan	NBC
1998	The Larry Sanders Show	"Putting the ‘Gay’ Back in Litigation"	Richard Day, Alex Gregory and Peter Huyck	HBO
1999	Frasier	"Merry Christmas, Mrs. Moskowitz"	Jay Kogen	NBC
1999	Ally McBeal	"Sideshow"	David E. Kelley	Fox
1999	Friends	"The One Where Everybody Finds Out"	Alexa Junge	NBC
1999	Just Shoot Me!	"Slow Donnie"	Steven Levitan	NBC
1999	Sports Night	"The Apology"	Aaron Sorkin	ABC

=== 2000s ===
Year	Program	Episode	Nominee(s)	Network
2000	Malcolm in the Middle	"Pilot"	Linwood Boomer	Fox
2000	Everybody Loves Raymond	"Bad Moon Rising"	Ray Romano and Philip Rosenthal	CBS
2000	Frasier	"Something Borrowed, Someone Blue"	Christopher Lloyd and Joe Keenan	NBC
2000	Freaks and Geeks	"Pilot"	Paul Feig	NBC
2000	Sex and the City	"Evolution"	Cindy Chupack	HBO
2000	Sex and the City	"Ex and the City"	Michael Patrick King	HBO
2001	Malcolm in the Middle	"Bowling"	Alex Reid	Fox
2001	Ed	"Pilot"	Jon Beckerman and Rob Burnett	NBC
2001	Freaks and Geeks	"Discos and Dragons"	Paul Feig	NBC
2001	Sex and the City	"Easy Come, Easy Go"	Michael Patrick King	HBO
2001	Will & Grace	"Lows in the Mid-Eighties"	Jeff Greenstein	NBC
2002	The Bernie Mac Show	"Pilot"	Larry Wilmore	Fox
2002	Andy Richter Controls the Universe	"Pilot"	Victor Fresco	Fox
2002	Everybody Loves Raymond	"The Angry Family"	Philip Rosenthal	CBS
2002	Everybody Loves Raymond	"Marie's Sculpture"	Jennifer Crittenden	CBS
2002	Sex and the City	"My Motherboard, My Self"	Julie Rottenberg and Elisa Zuritsky	HBO
2003	Everybody Loves Raymond	"Baggage"	Tucker Cawley	CBS
2003	The Bernie Mac Show	"Goodbye Dolly"	Steve Tompkins	Fox
2003	Everybody Loves Raymond	"Counseling"	Mike Royce	CBS
2003	Lucky	"Pilot"	Robb Cullen and Mark	FX
2003	Sex and the City	"I Love a Charade"	Cindy Chupack and Michael Patrick King	HBO
2004	Arrested Development	"Pilot"	Mitchell Hurwitz	Fox
2004	Frasier	"Goodnight, Seattle"	Christopher Lloyd and Joe Keenan	NBC
2004	Scrubs	"My Screw Up"	Neil Goldman and Garrett Donovan	NBC
2004	Sex and the City	"An American Girl in Paris: Part Deux"	Michael Patrick King	HBO
2004	Sex and the City	"The Ick Factor"	Julie Rottenberg and Elisa Zuritsky	HBO
2005	Arrested Development	"Righteous Brothers"	Mitchell Hurwitz and Jim Vallely	Fox
2005	Arrested Development	"Sad Sack"	Barbie Adler	Fox
2005	Arrested Development	"Sword of Destiny"	Brad Copeland	Fox
2005	Desperate Housewives	"Pilot"	Marc Cherry	ABC
2005	Everybody Loves Raymond	"The Finale"	Philip Rosenthal, Ray Romano, Tucker Cawley, Lew Schneider, Steve Skrovan, Jeremy Stevens, Mike Royce, Aaron Shure, Tom Caltabiano and Leslie Caveny	CBS
2006	My Name Is Earl	"Pilot"	Greg Garcia	NBC
2006	Arrested Development	"Development Arrested"	Story by : Richard Day and Mitchell Hurwitz; Teleplay by : Chuck Tatham and Jim Vallely	Fox
2006	Entourage	"Exodus"	Doug Ellin	HBO
2006	Extras	"Kate Winslet"	Ricky Gervais and Stephen Merchant	HBO
2006	The Office	"Christmas Party"	Michael Schur	NBC
2007	The Office	"Gay Witch Hunt"	Greg Daniels	NBC
2007	30 Rock	"Jack-Tor"	Robert Carlock	NBC
2007	30 Rock	"Tracy Does Conan"	Tina Fey	NBC
2007	Extras	"Daniel Radcliffe"	Ricky Gervais and Stephen Merchant	HBO
2007	The Office	"The Negotiation"	Michael Schur	NBC
2008	30 Rock	"Cooter"	Tina Fey	NBC
2008	30 Rock	"Rosemary's Baby"	Jack Burditt	NBC
2008	Flight of the Conchords	"Yoko"	James Bobin, Jemaine Clement and Bret McKenzie	HBO
2008	The Office	"Dinner Party"	Gene Stupnitsky and Lee Eisenberg	NBC
2008	Pushing Daisies	"Pie-lette"	Bryan Fuller	ABC
2009	30 Rock	"Reunion"	Matt Hubbard	NBC
2009	30 Rock	"Apollo, Apollo"	Robert Carlock	NBC
2009	30 Rock	"Kidney Now!"	Jack Burditt and Robert Carlock	NBC
2009	30 Rock	"Mamma Mia"	Ron Weiner	NBC
2009	Flight of the Conchords	"Prime Minister"	James Bobin, Jemaine Clement and Bret McKenzie	HBO

=== 2010s ===
Year	Program	Episode	Nominee(s)	Network
2010	Modern Family	"Pilot"	Steven Levitan and Christopher Lloyd	ABC
2010	30 Rock	"Anna Howard Shaw Day"	Matt Hubbard	NBC
2010	30 Rock	"Lee Marvin vs. Derek Jeter"	Kay Cannon and Tina Fey	NBC
2010	Glee	"Pilot"	Ryan Murphy, Brad Falchuk and Ian Brennan	Fox
2010	The Office	"Niagara"	Greg Daniels and Mindy Kaling	NBC
2011	Modern Family	"Caught in the Act"	Steven Levitan and Jeffrey Richman	ABC
2011	30 Rock	"Reaganing"	Matt Hubbard	NBC
2011	Episodes	"Episode 107"	David Crane and Jeffrey Klarik	Showtime
2011	Louie	"Poker/Divorce"	Louis C.K.	FX
2011	The Office	"Goodbye, Michael"	Greg Daniels	NBC
2012	Louie	"Pregnant"	Louis C.K.	FX
2012	Community	"Remedial Chaos Theory"	Chris McKenna	NBC
2012	Girls	"Pilot"	Lena Dunham	HBO
2012	Parks and Recreation	"The Debate"	Amy Poehler	NBC
2012	Parks and Recreation	"Win, Lose, or Draw"	Michael Schur	NBC
2013	30 Rock	"Last Lunch"	Tina Fey and Tracey Wigfield	NBC
2013	30 Rock	"Hogcock!"	Jack Burditt and Robert Carlock	NBC
2013	Episodes	"Episode 209"	David Crane and Jeffrey Klarik	Showtime
2013	Louie	"Daddy's Girlfriend, Part 1"	Story by : Pamela Adlon and Louis C.K. Teleplay by : Louis C.K.	FX
2013	The Office	"Finale"	Greg Daniels	NBC
2014	Louie	"So Did the Fat Lady"	Louis C.K.	FX
2014	Episodes	"Episode 305"	David Crane and Jeffrey Klarik	Showtime
2014	Orange Is the New Black	"I Wasn't Ready"	Liz Friedman and Jenji Kohan	Netflix
2014	Silicon Valley	"Optimal Tip-to-Tip Efficiency"	Alec Berg	HBO
2014	Veep	"Special Relationship"	Story by : Simon Blackwell, Armando Iannucci and Tony Roche; Teleplay by : Simon Blackwell and Tony Roche	HBO
2015	Veep	"Election Night"	Story by : Simon Blackwell, Armando Iannucci and Tony Roche; Teleplay by : Simon Blackwell and Tony Roche	HBO
2015	Episodes	"Episode 409"	David Crane and Jeffrey Klarik	Showtime
2015	The Last Man on Earth	"Alive in Tucson"	Will Forte	Fox
2015	Louie	"Bobby's House"	Louis C.K.	FX
2015	Silicon Valley	"Two Days of the Condor"	Alec Berg	HBO
2015	Transparent	"Pilot"	Jill Soloway	Amazon
2016	Master of None	"Parents"	Aziz Ansari and Alan Yang	Netflix
2016	Catastrophe	"Episode 1"	Rob Delaney and Sharon Horgan	Amazon
2016	Silicon Valley	"Founder Friendly"	Dan O'Keefe	HBO
2016	Silicon Valley	"The Uptick"	Alec Berg	HBO
2016	Veep	"Morning After"	David Mandel	HBO
2016	Veep	"Mother"	Alex Gregory and Peter Huyck	HBO
2017	Master of None	"Thanksgiving"	Aziz Ansari and Lena Waithe	Netflix
2017	Atlanta	"B.A.N."	Donald Glover	FX
2017	Atlanta	"Streets on Lock"	Stephen Glover	FX
2017	Silicon Valley	"Success Failure"	Alec Berg	HBO
2017	Veep	"Georgia"	Billy Kimball	HBO
2017	Veep	"Groundbreaking"	David Mandel	HBO
2018	The Marvelous Mrs. Maisel	"Pilot"	Amy Sherman-Palladino	Amazon
2018	Atlanta	"Alligator Man"	Donald Glover	FX
2018	Atlanta	"Barbershop"	Stefani Robinson	FX
2018	Barry	"Chapter One: Make Your Mark"	Alec Berg and Bill Hader	HBO
2018	Barry	"Chapter Seven: Loud, Fast, and Keep Going"	Elizabeth Sarnoff	HBO
2018	Silicon Valley	"Fifty-One Percent"	Alec Berg	HBO
2019
2019	Fleabag	"Episode 201"	Phoebe Waller-Bridge	Amazon
2019	Barry	"ronny/lily"	Alec Berg and Bill Hader	HBO
2019	The Good Place	"Janet(s)"	Josh Siegal and Dylan Morgan	NBC
2019	PEN15	"Anna Ishii-Peters"	Maya Erskine, Anna Konkle and Stacy Osei-Kuffour	Hulu
2019	Russian Doll	"Nothing in This World Is Easy"	Story by : Natasha Lyonne, Leslye Headland and Amy Poehler; Teleplay by : Leslye Headland	Netflix
2019	Russian Doll	"A Warm Body"	Allison Silverman	Netflix
2019	Veep	"Veep"	David Mandel	HBO

=== 2020s ===
Year	Program	Episode	Nominee(s)	Network
2020
2020	Schitt's Creek	"Happy Ending"	Daniel Levy	Pop TV
2020	The Good Place	"Whenever You're Ready"	Michael Schur	NBC
2020	The Great	"The Great"	Tony McNamara	Hulu
2020	Schitt's Creek	"The Presidential Suite"	David West Read	Pop TV
2020	What We Do in the Shadows	"Collaboration"	Sam Johnson and Chris Marcil	FX
2020	What We Do in the Shadows	"Ghosts"	Paul Simms	FX
2020	What We Do in the Shadows	"On the Run"	Stefani Robinson	FX
2021
2021	Hacks	"There Is No Line"	Lucia Aniello, Paul W. Downs and Jen Statsky	HBO Max
2021	The Flight Attendant	"In Case of Emergency"	Steve Yockey	HBO Max
2021	Girls5eva	"Pilot"	Meredith Scardino	Peacock
2021	PEN15	"Play"	Maya Erskine	Hulu
2021	Ted Lasso	"Make Rebecca Great Again"	Story by : Brendan Hunt and Joe Kelly; Teleplay by : Jason Sudeikis	Apple TV+
2021	Ted Lasso	"Pilot"	Story by : Jason Sudeikis & Bill Lawrence and Brendan Hunt & Joe Kelly; Teleplay by : Jason Sudeikis and Bill Lawrence	Apple TV+
2022
2022	Abbott Elementary	"Pilot"	Quinta Brunson	ABC
2022	Barry	"710N"	Duffy Boudreau	HBO
2022	Barry	"starting now"	Alec Berg and Bill Hader	HBO
2022	Hacks	"The One, the Only"	Lucia Aniello, Paul W. Downs and Jen Statsky	HBO Max
2022	Only Murders in the Building	"True Crime"	Steve Martin and John Hoffman	Hulu
2022	Ted Lasso	"No Weddings and a Funeral"	Jane Becker	Apple TV+
2022	What We Do in the Shadows	"The Casino"	Sarah Naftalis	FX
2022	What We Do in the Shadows	"The Wellness Center"	Stefani Robinson	FX
2023
2023	The Bear	"System"	Christopher Storer	FX
2023	Barry	"wow"	Bill Hader	HBO
2023	Jury Duty	"Ineffective Assistance"	Mekki Leeper	Amazon Freevee
2023	Only Murders in the Building	"I Know Who Did It"	John Hoffman, Matteo Borghese and Rob Turbovsky	Hulu
2023	The Other Two	"Cary & Brooke Go to an AIDS Play"	Chris Kelly and Sarah Schneider	HBO Max
2023	Ted Lasso	"So Long, Farewell"	Brendan Hunt, Joe Kelly and Jason Sudeikis	Apple TV+
2024
2024	Hacks	"Bulletproof"	Lucia Aniello, Paul W. Downs and Jen Statsky	Max
2024	Abbott Elementary	"Career Day"	Quinta Brunson	ABC
2024	The Bear	"Fishes"	Christopher Storer and Joanna Calo	FX
2024	Girls5eva	"Orlando"	Meredith Scardino and Sam Means	Netflix
2024	The Other Two	"Brooke Hosts a Night of Undeniable Good"	Chris Kelly and Sarah Schneider	Max
2024	What We Do in the Shadows	"Pride Parade"	Jake Bender and Zach Dunn	FX
2025
2025	The Studio	"The Promotion"	Seth Rogen, Evan Goldberg, Peter Huyck, Alex Gregory and Frida Perez	Apple TV+
2025	Abbott Elementary	"Back to School"	Quinta Brunson	ABC
2025	Hacks	"A Slippery Slope"	Lucia Aniello, Paul W. Downs and Jen Statsky	HBO Max
2025	The Rehearsal	"Pilot's Code"	Nathan Fielder, Carrie Kemper, Adam Locke-Norton and Eric Notarnicola	HBO
2025	Somebody Somewhere	"AGG"	Hannah Bos, Paul Thureen and Bridget Everett	HBO
2025	What We Do in the Shadows	"The Finale"	Sam Johnson, Sarah Naftalis and Paul Simms	FX
2026
2026	Widow's Bay	"Welcome to Widow's Bay"	Katie Dippold	Apple TV
2026	Abbott Elementary	"Team Building"	Quinta Brunson	ABC
2026	The Chair Company	"Life goes by too f**king fast, it really does."	Tim Robinson and Zach Kanin	HBO
2026	The Comeback	"Valerie Does It All"	Michael Patrick King and Lisa Kudrow	HBO
2026	Hacks	"Hacks"	Lucia Aniello, Paul W. Downs and Jen Statsky	HBO Max
2026	Jury Duty Presents: Company Retreat	"Mergers & Acquisitions"	Anthony King	Prime Video

== Total awards by network ==
- CBS – 22
- NBC – 19
- ABC – 8
- Fox – 5
- FX – 2
- HBO – 2
- HBO Max — 2
- Netflix – 2
- Prime Video – 2
- Apple TV+ - 1
- Pop TV – 1

== Individuals with multiple awards ==
3 awards

- Allan Burns
- Nat Hiken
- Coleman Jacoby
- Carl Reiner
- Arnold Rosen
- Tony Webster
- Ed. Weinberger

2 awards

- David Angell
- Lucia Aniello
- Aziz Ansari
- George Balzer
- James L. Brooks
- Louis C.K.
- Stan Daniels
- Sam Denoff
- Paul W. Downs
- Tina Fey
- Anne Flett-Giordano
- Billy Friedberg
- Hal Goldman
- Al Gordon
- Mitchell Hurwitz
- Michael Leeson
- Steven Levitan
- Christopher Lloyd
- David Lloyd
- Sam Perrin
- Bill Persky
- Chuck Ranberg
- Terry Ryan
- Jen Statsky
- Leonard Stern

== Individuals with multiple nominations ==
9 nominations

- David Lloyd

8 nominations

- Alec Berg

7 nominations

- George Balzer
- Larry David
- Larry Gelbart
- Hal Goldman
- Al Gordon
- Sam Perrin
- Garry Shandling

6 nominations

- Glen Charles
- Les Charles
- Nat Hiken
- Arnie Rosen
- Peter Tolan

5 nominations

- Lucia Aniello
- Allan Burns
- Louis C.K.
- David Crane
- Paul W. Downs
- David Isaacs
- Coleman Jacoby
- Joe Keenan
- Michael Patrick King
- Ken Levine
- Mel Tolkin
- Jen Statsky
- Tony Webster

4 nominations

- Alan Alda
- Gary Belkin
- James L. Brooks
- Mel Brooks
- Quinta Brunson
- Jack Burditt
- Robert Carlock
- Greg Daniels
- Diane English
- Tina Fey
- Bill Hader
- Sheldon Keller
- Jeffrey Klarik
- Michael Leeson
- Steven Levitan
- Christopher Lloyd
- David Panich
- Carl Reiner
- Bob Schiller
- Michael Schur
- Paul Simms
- Jay Tarses
- Ed. Weinberger
- Bob Weiskopf

3 nominations

- Danny Arnold
- Jim Carlson
- Bob Carroll, Jr.
- Peter Casey
- Stan Daniels
- Sam Denoff
- Jack Douglas
- Alex Gregory
- Buck Henry
- Matt Hubbard
- Brendan Hunt
- Mitchell Hurwitz
- Peter Huyck
- Coslough Johnson
- Milt Josefsberg
- Joe Kelly
- Norman Lear
- David Lee
- Marc London
- David Mandel
- Allan Manings
- Thomas Meehan
- Dave O'Brien
- Bill Persky
- Madelyn Pugh
- Martin Ragaway
- John Rappaport
- Stefani Robinson
- Roswell Rogers
- Philip Rosenthal
- Terry Ryan
- Herbert Sargent
- Red Skelton
- Leonard B. Stern
- Jason Sudeikis

2 nominations

- David Angell
- Aziz Ansari
- Simon Blackwell
- Linda Bloodworth-Thomason
- James Bobin
- John Carsey
- Tucker Cawley
- Ernest Chambers
- Larry Charles
- Cindy Chupack
- Jemaine Clement
- Richard Day
- Gary Dontzig
- Robert Emmett
- Maya Erskine
- Ken Estin
- Gene Farmer
- Paul Feig
- Anne Flett-Giordano
- Donald Glover
- Maya Forbes
- Gerald Gardner
- Ricky Gervais
- Everett Greenbaum
- Jeff Greenstein
- Chris Hayward
- Paul Henning
- Don Hinkley
- John Hoffman
- Peter Huyck
- Armando Iannucci
- Sam Johnson
- Hal Kanter
- Chris Kelly
- David E. Kelley
- Paul Keyes
- Ernie Kovacs
- Jeremy Lloyd
- John Markus
- Mike Marmer
- Bret McKenzie
- Stephen Merchant
- Lorne Michaels
- Jim Mulligan
- Lorenzo Music
- Sarah Naftalis
- Jess Oppenheimer
- Tom Patchett
- Steven Peterman
- Arthur Phillips
- Amy Poehler
- Earl Pomerantz
- Larry Rhine
- Tony Roche
- Ray Romano
- Julie Rottenberg
- Mike Royce
- Meredith Scardino
- Sarah Schneider
- Al Schwartz
- Sherwood Schwartz
- Phil Sharp
- Tony Sheehan
- Amy Sherman-Palladino
- Rosie Shuster
- Larry Siegel
- Ed Simmons
- Neil Simon
- Stephen Spears
- Michael Stewart
- Christopher Storer
- Burt Styler
- Saul Turteltaub
- Jim Vallely
- Jon Vitti
- Hugh Wedlock Jr.
- Michael J. Weithorn
- Hugh Wilson
- Harry Winkler
- Elisa Zuritsky
- Alan Zweibel

== Programs with multiple awards ==
5 awards

- The Mary Tyler Moore Show (4 consecutive)

4 awards

- The Dick Van Dyke Show (3 consecutive)
- Frasier (3 consecutive)

3 awards

- 30 Rock (2 consecutive)
- All in the Family (2 consecutive)
- The Phil Silvers Show (consecutive)

2 awards

- Arrested Development (consecutive)
- Cheers (consecutive)
- Hacks
- The Jack Benny Show (consecutive)
- Louie
- Malcolm in the Middle (consecutive)
- Master of None (consecutive)
- Modern Family (consecutive)
- Murphy Brown
- Seinfeld (consecutive)
- Taxi (consecutive)

== Programs with multiple nominations ==
13 nominations

- 30 Rock
- Cheers
- The Larry Sanders Show

12 nominations

- M*A*S*H

11 nominations

- Seinfeld

10 nominations

- All in the Family

9 nominations

- Frasier
- The Mary Tyler Moore Show

8 nominations

- Taxi

7 nominations

- The Jack Benny Show
- The Office
- Sex and the City
- Veep
- What We Do in the Shadows

6 nominations

- Barry
- The Dick Van Dyke Show
- Everybody Loves Raymond
- Murphy Brown
- Silicon Valley
- The Wonder Years

5 nominations

- Arrested Development
- Hacks
- Louie

4 nominations

- Abbott Elementary
- Atlanta
- Barney Miller
- The Cosby Show
- Episodes
- The Phil Silvers Show
- Ted Lasso

3 nominations

- Buffalo Bill
- Caesar's Hour
- Father Knows Best
- The Golden Girls
- The Red Skelton Show
- Rowan & Martin's Laugh-In

2 nominations

- Ally McBeal
- The Associates
- The Bear
- The Bernie Mac Show
- Car 54, Where Are You?
- The Danny Thomas Show (originally known as Make Room for Daddy)
- The Days and Nights of Molly Dodd
- Ellen
- Extras
- Family Ties
- Flight of the Conchords
- Freaks and Geeks
- Friends
- The George Gobel Show
- Get Smart
- Girls5eva
- The Good Place
- He & She
- I Love Lucy
- It's Garry Shandling's Show
- Jury Duty
- Malcolm in the Middle
- Master of None
- Modern Family
- Newhart
- Only Murders in the Building
- The Other Two
- Parks and Recreation
- PEN15
- Russian Doll
- Schitt's Creek
- That Was the Week That Was

== See also ==
- Primetime Emmy Award for Outstanding Writing for a Drama Series
- Primetime Emmy Award for Outstanding Writing for a Variety Series
