= 7th Primetime Emmy Awards =

- Date: March 7, 1955
- Location: Moulin Rouge Nightclub, Los Angeles, California
- Presented by: Academy of Television Arts and Sciences
- Hosted by: Steve Allen

Highlights
- Most awards: Studio One (3)
- Most nominations: I Love Lucy; The Jackie Gleason Show; Studio One (5)
- Best Dramatic Series: The United States Steel Hour
- Best Situation Comedy Series: Make Room for Daddy
- Best Variety Series Including Musical Varieties: Disneyland

Television/radio coverage
- Network: NBC

The 7th Emmy Awards, later referred to as the 7th Primetime Emmy Awards, were held on March 7, 1955, to honor the best in television of the year. The ceremony was held at the "Moulin Rouge Nightclub" in Hollywood, California. The ceremony, hosted by Steve Allen and broadcast on NBC, was the first Emmy Awards ceremony to be televised nationally. All nominations are listed, with winners in bold and series' networks are in parentheses. New categories for this ceremony included awards for writing and directing, as well as one-time performances in anthology series, (this category would eventually morph into the current guest-acting category). Studio One was the most successful show of the night, winning three awards.

Fredric March made Emmy history when he became the first actor to be nominated for two different works in the same category. However, he lost for both of his performances in the category of Best Actor in a Single Performance.

== Winners and nominees ==
Winners are listed first, highlighted in boldface, and indicated with a double dagger (‡).

=== Programs ===
Programs
**Best Situation Comedy**: **Make Room for Daddy (ABC)**‡; The George Burns and Gracie Allen Show (CBS); I Love Lucy (CBS); Mister Peepers (NBC); Our Miss Brooks (CBS); Private Secretary (CBS)	**Best Dramatic Program**: **The United States Steel Hour (ABC)**‡; Four Star Playhouse (CBS); Medic (NBC); The Philco Television Playhouse (NBC); Studio One (CBS)
**Best Variety Series including Musical Varieties**: **Disneyland (ABC)**‡; The Ed Sullivan Show (CBS); The George Gobel Show (NBC); The Jack Benny Program (CBS); The Jackie Gleason Show (CBS); Your Hit Parade (NBC)	**Best Audience, Guest Participation, or Panel Program**: **This Is Your Life (NBC)**‡; Masquerade Party (ABC); People Are Funny (NBC); What's My Line? (CBS); You Bet Your Life (CBS)
**Best Mystery or Intrigue Series**: **Dragnet (NBC)**‡; Foreign Intrigue (NBC); I Led Three Lives (NBC); Racket Squad (CBS); Waterfront (Syndicated)	**Best Children's Program**: **Lassie (CBS)**‡; Art Linkletter and the Kids (Syndicated); Ding Dong School (NBC); Kukla, Fran and Ollie (ABC); Time for Beany (PTN); Zoo Parade (NBC)
**Best Cultural, Religious, or Educational Program**: **Omnibus (CBS)**‡; Life Is Worth Living (DuMont); Meet the Press (NBC); See It Now (CBS)	**Best Sports Program**: **Gillette Cavalcade of Sports (NBC)**‡; Forrest Hills Tennis Matches (NBC); Greatest Moments in Sports (NBC); NCAA Football Games (ABC); Pabst Blue Ribbion Bouts (CBS); Professional Football (DuMont)
**Best Western or Adventure Series**: **Stories of the Century (Syndicated)**‡; The Adventures of Wild Bill Hickok (Syndicated); Annie Oakley (Syndicated); Death Valley Days (CBS); The Roy Rogers Show (NBC)	**Best Daytime Program**: **House Party (CBS)**‡; The Betty White Show (NBC); The Bob Crosby Show (CBS); The Garry Moore Show (CBS); The Robert Q. Lewis Show (CBS)
**Best Individual Program of the Year**: **Disneyland: "Operation Undersea" (ABC)**‡; Light's Diamond Jubilee (Simulcast); Medic: "White Is the Color" (NBC); Shower of Stars: "A Christmas Carol" (CBS); Studio One: "Twelve Angry Men" (CBS)

=== Acting ===
==== Lead performances ====
Lead performances
**Best Actor Starring in a Regular Series**: **Danny Thomas – Make Room for Daddy as Danny Williams (ABC)**‡; Richard Boone – Medic as Dr. Konrad Styner (NBC); Robert Cummings – My Hero as Bob Beanblossom (NBC); Jackie Gleason – The Jackie Gleason Show as Ralph Kramden (CBS); Jack Webb – Dragnet as Sgt. Joe Friday (NBC)	**Best Actress Starring in a Regular Series**: **Loretta Young – The Loretta Young Show as herself (NBC)**‡; Gracie Allen – The George Burns and Gracie Allen Show as Gracie Allen (CBS); Eve Arden – Our Miss Brooks as Connie Brooks (CBS); Lucille Ball – I Love Lucy as Lucy Ricardo (CBS); Ann Sothern – Private Secretary as Susie McNamara (CBS)

==== Supporting performances ====
Supporting performances
**Best Supporting Actor in a Regular Series**: **Art Carney – The Jackie Gleason Show as Ed Norton (CBS)**‡; Ben Alexander – Dragnet as Officer Frank Smith (NBC); Don DeFore – The Adventures of Ozzie and Harriet as Thorny (ABC); William Frawley – I Love Lucy as Fred Mertz (CBS); Gale Gordon – Our Miss Brooks as Osgood Conklin (CBS)	**Best Supporting Actress in a Regular Series**: **Audrey Meadows – The Jackie Gleason Show as Alice Kramden (CBS)**‡; Bea Benaderet – The George Burns and Gracie Allen Show as Blanche Morton (CBS); Jean Hagen – Make Room for Daddy as Margaret Williams (ABC); Marion Lorne – Mister Peepers as Mrs. Gurney (NBC); Vivian Vance – I Love Lucy as Ethel Mertz (CBS)

==== Single performances ====
Single performances
**Best Actor in a Single Performance**: **Robert Cummings – Studio One: "Twelve Angry Men" as Juror #8 (CBS)**‡; Frank Lovejoy – Lux Video Theatre: "Double Indemnity" as Walter Neff (CBS); Fredric March – The Best of Broadway: "The Royal Family" as Tony Cavendish (CBS); Fredric March – Shower of Stars: "A Christmas Carol" as Ebenezer Scrooge (CBS); Thomas Mitchell – The Ford Television Theatre: "The Good of His Soul" as Father Devlin (NBC); David Niven – Four Star Playhouse: "The Answer" as Deacon (CBS)	**Best Actress in a Single Performance**: **Judith Anderson – Hallmark Hall of Fame: "Macbeth" as Lady Macbeth (CBS)**‡; Ethel Barrymore – Climax!: "The Thirteenth Chair" as Mme. Rosalie La Grange (CBS); Beverly Garland – Medic: "White Is the Color" as Estelle Collins (NBC); Ruth Hussey – Lux Video Theatre: "Craig's Wife" as Harriet Craig (CBS); Dorothy McGuire – Climax!: "The Gioconda Smile" as Janet Spence (CBS); Eva Marie Saint – The Philco Television Playhouse: "Middle of the Night" as Betty (NBC); Claire Trevor – Lux Video Theatre: "Ladies in Retirement" as Ellen Creed (CBS)

=== Directing ===
Directing
**Best Direction**
- **Studio One: "Twelve Angry Men" – Franklin Schaffner (CBS)**‡
  - Four Star Playhouse – Roy Kellino (CBS)
  - The Loretta Young Show – Robert Florey (NBC)
  - The United States Steel Hour – Alex Segal (ABC)
  - Waterfront – Ted Post (Syndicated)
  - Your Hit Parade – Clark Jones (NBC)

=== Writing ===
Writing
**Best Written Comedy Material**: **The George Gobel Show – James B. Allardice, Jack Douglas, Hal Kanter and Harry Winkler (NBC)**‡; I Love Lucy – Jess Oppenheimer, Bob Carroll, Jr. and Madelyn Pugh Davis (CBS); The Jack Benny Program – George Balzer, Milt Josefsberg, Sam Perrin and John Tackaberry (CBS); The Jackie Gleason Show – Jackie Gleason (CBS); Make Room for Daddy – Danny Thomas (ABC); Mister Peepers – Jim Fritzell and Everett Greenbaum (NBC)	**Best Written Dramatic Material**: **Studio One: "Twelve Angry Men" – Reginald Rose (CBS)**‡; Climax!: "An Error in Chemistry" – David Dortort (CBS); Four Star Playhouse: "The Answer" – Leonard Freeman (CBS); Medic: "White Is the Color" – James Moser (NBC); The Philco Television Playhouse – Paddy Chayefsky (NBC)

=== News and miscellaneous category ===
Hosting
**Best News Reporter or Commentator**: **John Daly (ABC)**‡; Douglas Edwards (CBS); Clete Roberts (Syndication); John Cameron Swayze (NBC); Eric Sevareid (CBS)	**Most Outstanding New Personality**: **George Gobel (NBC)**‡; Richard Boone (NBC); Walt Disney (ABC); Preston Foster (Syndication); Tennessee Ernie Ford (CBS); Michael O'Shea (NBC); Fess Parker (ABC)

=== Singing ===
Singing
**Best Male Singer**: **Perry Como (NBC)**‡; Eddie Fisher (NBC); Frankie Laine (Syndication); Gordon MacRae (NBC); Tony Martin (NBC)	**Best Female Singer**: **Dinah Shore (NBC)**‡; Jane Froman (CBS); Peggy King (NBC); Gisele MacKenzie (NBC); Jo Stafford (CBS)

== Most major nominations ==
Networks with multiple major nominations (Note: "Major" constitutes the categories listed above: Program, Acting, Directing, and Writing. Does not include the technical categories.)
Network	Number of Nominations
CBS	60
NBC	44
ABC	15

Programs with multiple major nominations
Program	Category	Network	Number of Nominations
I Love Lucy	Comedy	CBS	5
The Jackie Gleason Show	Variety	CBS	5
Studio One	Drama	CBS	5
Four Star Playhouse	Drama	CBS	4
Make Room for Daddy	Comedy	ABC	4
Medic	Drama	NBC	4
Climax!	Drama	CBS	3
Dragnet	Mystery/Intrigue	NBC	3
The George Burns and Gracie Allen Show	Comedy	CBS	3
Lux Video Theatre	Drama	CBS	3
Mister Peepers	Comedy	NBC	3
Our Miss Brooks	Comedy	CBS	3
The Philco Television Playhouse	Drama	NBC	3
A Christmas Carol	Drama	CBS	2
Disneyland	Variety	ABC	2
The George Gobel Show	Variety	NBC	2
The Jack Benny Program	Variety	CBS	2
The Loretta Young Show	Drama	NBC	2
Private Secretary	Comedy	CBS	2
The United States Steel Hour	Drama	ABC	2
Waterfront	Mystery/Intrigue	Syndicated	2
Your Hit Parade	Variety	NBC	2

== Most major awards ==
Networks with multiple major awards
Network	Number of Awards
CBS	10
NBC	7
ABC	6

Programs with multiple major awards
Program	Category	Network	Number of Awards
Studio One	Drama	CBS	3
Disneyland	Variety	ABC	2
The Jackie Gleason Show	Variety	CBS	2
Make Room for Daddy	Comedy	ABC	2
