= The Pride of the Family =

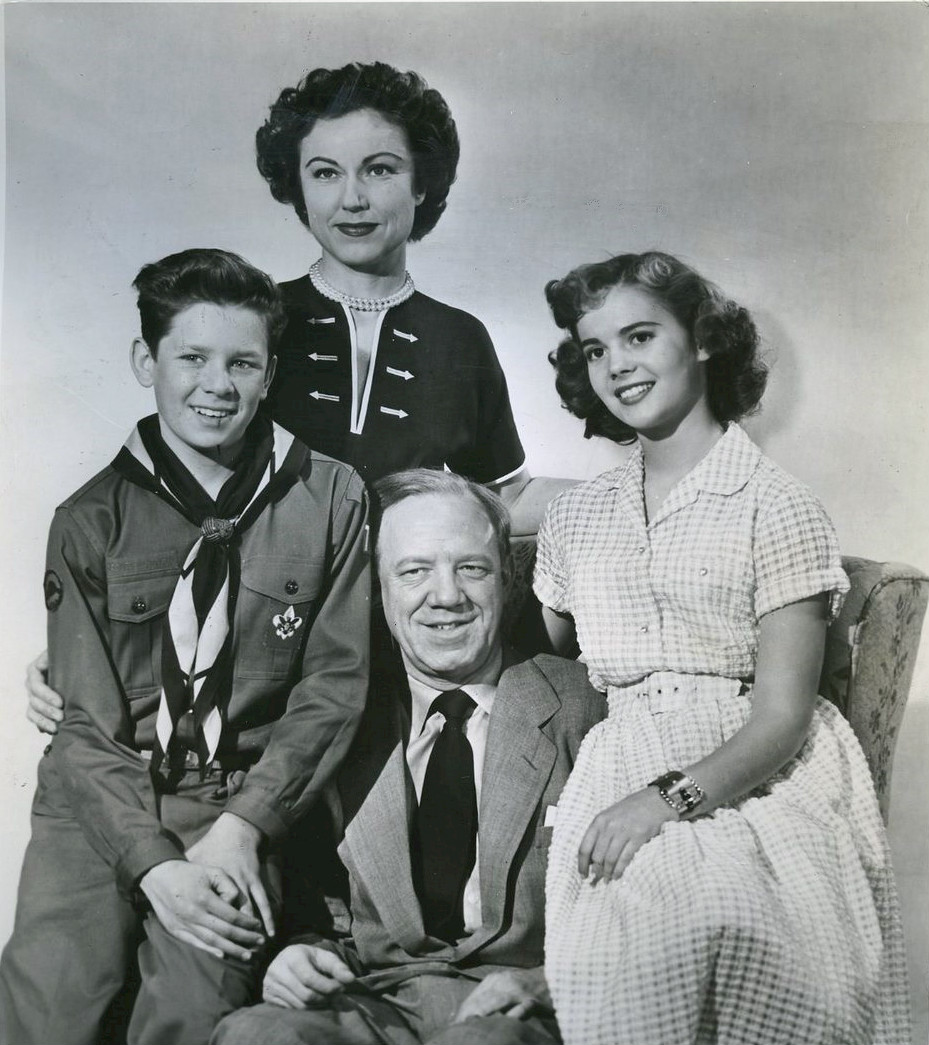
- Cast photo from Pride of the Family: Bobby Hyatt, Fay Wray, Paul Hartman and Natalie Wood.
- Genre: Situation comedy
- Written by: Paul Schneider; Clint Comerford; Fred Howard; Irving Phillips; Al Gordon; Jack Fleischman; Hal Goldman
- Directed by: Bob Finkel
- Starring: Paul Hartman; Fay Wray; Natalie Wood; Bobby Hyatt
- No. of seasons: 1
- No. of episodes: 39

Production
- Producer: Sam Perrin
- Running time: 30 minutes
- Production company: Revue Productions

Original release
- Release: October 2, 1953 – September 24, 1954

The Pride of the Family is a 30-minute American television situation comedy that was broadcast on ABC from October 2, 1953, until September 24, 1954. CBS showed reruns of the program in prime time in the summer of 1955.

== Premise ==
Albie Morrison headed a newspaper's advertising department and was head of a family that included his wife, Catherine; teenage daughter, Ann; and son, Junior.

== Cast ==
- Albie Morrison-Paul Hartman
- Catherine Morrison-Fay Wray
- Ann Morrison-Natalie Wood
- Junior Morrison-Bobby Hyatt

== Production ==
Sam Perrin was the producer, for Revue Productions. Bob Finkel was the director. Writers included Paul Schneider, Clint Comerford, Fred Howard, Irving Phillips, Al Gordon, Jack Fleischman, and Hal Goldman.

Thirty-nine episodes were filmed in black-and-white with a laugh track. Sponsors included Bufferin pain reliever, Ipana toothpaste, and Dial soap and shampoo.

== Reception ==
A review in TV Guide compared The Pride of the Family to many other situation comedies in that its "situations are contrived to the point of absurdity". The review attributed most of the laughs in the program to Hartman's "wonderfully mobile face" and said that Wray "deserves better" after she came out of retirement to be in this show.

The trade publication Billboard's review of the show's first episode described it as "a rather slow-moving situation comedy series with a competent cast, but only so-so scripting". Although it complimented Wray as "gracious and telegenic" and Hartman as revealing "an unexpected gift for pathos", it summarized the show overall as "average".
