= Tony Webster =

Tony Webster may refer to:

- Tony Webster (EastEnders), a character in British TV soap opera EastEnders
- Tony Webster, a character in the British TV sitcom The Fall and Rise of Reginald Perrin, played by Trevor Adams
- Tony Webster (screenwriter) (1922–1987), American screenwriter
- Tony Webster, a journalist whose Twitter account was banned during the December 2022 Twitter suspensions
