= Primetime Emmy Award for Outstanding New Series =

Television award category

The Primetime Emmy Award for Outstanding New Series was a Primetime Emmy Award presented to the best new television series sporadically from 1954 to 1973.

== Winners and nominations ==
=== 1950s ===
Year	Program	Network	Nominee(s)	Ref.
1953 (6th)
1953 (6th)	Make Room for Daddy	ABC	Louis F. Edelman, executive producer; Sheldon Leonard, Charles Stewart, producers	
1953 (6th)	The United States Steel Hour	ABC	George Kondolf, Carol Irwin, producers	
1953 (6th)	Adventure	CBS	Robert Northshield, producer	
1953 (6th)	Ding Dong School	NBC	Reinald Werrenrath, producer	
1953 (6th)	Letter to Loretta	NBC	Tom Lewis, Matthew Rapf, executive producers	
1953 (6th)	Person to Person	CBS	John Aaron, Jesse Zousmer, Charles Hill, Robert Sammon, Edward R. Murrow, producers	
1956 (9th)
1956 (9th)	Playhouse 90	CBS	Peter Kortner, executive producer; Julian Claman, Martin Manulis, Herbert Brodkin, producers	
1956 (9th)	Air Power	CBS	Perry Wolff, James B Faichney, producers	
1956 (9th)	The Dinah Shore Chevy Show	NBC	Bob Banner, Robert Wells, producers	
1956 (9th)	The Ernie Kovacs Show	NBC	Louis Heyward, producer	
1956 (9th)	The Steve Allen Sunday Show	NBC	Nick Vanoff, producer	
1957 (10th)
1957 (10th)	The Seven Lively Arts	CBS	John Houseman, executive producer; Robert Herridge, producer	
1957 (10th)	Leave it to Beaver	CBS	Joe Connelly, Bob Mosher, producers	
1957 (10th)	Maverick	ABC	William T. Orr, executive producer; Roy Huggins, Coles Trapnell, producers	
1957 (10th)	Tonight Starring Jack Paar	NBC	Perry Cross, Paul Keyes, Bob Shanks, producers	
1957 (10th)	Wagon Train	NBC	Howard Christie, Richard Lewis, executive producers; Frederick Shorr, producer	

=== 1970s ===
Year	Program	Network	Nominee(s)	Ref.
1969–1970 (22nd)
1969–1970 (22nd)	Room 222	CBS	Gene Reynolds, producer	
1969–1970 (22nd)	The Bill Cosby Show	NBC	Bill Cosby, executive producer; Marvin Miller, producer	
1969–1970 (22nd)	The Forsyte Saga	PBS	Donald Wilson, producer	
1969–1970 (22nd)	Marcus Welby, M.D.	ABC	David J. O'Connell, producer; David Victor, executive producer	
1969–1970 (22nd)	Sesame Street	NET	David D. Connell, executive producer; Sam Gibbon, producer; Lutrelle Horne, producer; Jon Stone, producer	
1970–1971 (23rd)
1970–1971 (23rd)	All in the Family	CBS	Norman Lear, producer	
1970–1971 (23rd)	The Bold Ones: The Senator	NBC	David Levinson	
1970–1971 (23rd)	The Flip Wilson Show	NBC	Bob Henry, producer; Monte Kay, executive producer	
1970–1971 (23rd)	Mary Tyler Moore	CBS	James L. Brooks, executive producer; Allan Burns, executive producer; David Davis, producer	
1970–1971 (23rd)	The Odd Couple	ABC	Jerry Belson, executive producer; Jerry Davis, producer; Garry Marshall, executive producer	
1971–1972 (24th)
1971–1972 (24th)	Elizabeth R	PBS	Roderick Graham, producer; Christopher Sarson, executive producer	
1971–1972 (24th)	Columbo	NBC	Everett Chambers, producer; Richard Levinson, executive producer; William Link, executive producer	
1971–1972 (24th)	Sanford and Son	NBC	Aaron Ruben, producer; Bud Yorkin, executive producer	
1971–1972 (24th)	The Six Wives of Henry VIII	PBS	Mark Shivas, producer; Ronald Travers, producer	
1971–1972 (24th)	The Sonny & Cher Comedy Hour	CBS	Chris Bearde, producer; Allan Blye, producer	
1972–1973 (25th)
1972–1973 (25th)	America: A Personal History of the United States	NBC	Michael Gill, producer	
1972–1973 (25th)	The Julie Andrews Hour	ABC	Julie Andrews, Star; Nick Vanoff, producer	
1972–1973 (25th)	Kung Fu	ABC	Jerry Thorpe, producer	
1972–1973 (25th)	M*A*S*H	CBS	Gene Reynolds, producer	
1972–1973 (25th)	Maude	CBS	Norman Lear, executive producer; Rod Parker, producer	
1972–1973 (25th)	The Waltons	CBS	Robert L. Jacks, producer; Lee Rich, executive producer	
