= Primetime Emmy Award for Program of the Year =

Television award category

- Awarded for: Outstanding Program of the Year
- Country: United States
- Presented by: Academy of Television Arts & Sciences
- First award: 1955
- Currently held by: A War of Children (1973)
- Website: emmys.com

The Primetime Emmy Award for Program of the Year was an annual award presented as part of the Primetime Emmy Awards. It recognized the best single television program of the year. In early Emmy ceremonies, anthology series were more common than traditional sitcoms or dramas; this made Program of the Year the highest honor.

Though traditional comedy and drama series were nominated, the majority of nominees and winners were: telefilms, variety specials, and documentaries. The award was last presented in 1973.

== Winners and nominations ==
=== 1950s ===
Year	Program	Episode	Network
1954 (7th)
1954 (7th)	Disneyland	"Operation Undersea"	ABC
1954 (7th)	Light's Diamond Jubilee	Variety Special	Simulcast
1954 (7th)	Medic	"White is the Color"	NBC
1954 (7th)	Chrysler Shower of Stars	"A Christmas Carol"	CBS
1954 (7th)	Westinghouse Studio One	"Twelve Angry Men"	CBS
1955 (8th)
1955 (8th)	Producers' Showcase	"Peter Pan"	NBC
1955 (8th)	Disneyland	"Davy Crockett and the River Pirates"	ABC
1955 (8th)	Ford Star Jubilee	"The Caine Mutiny Court-Martial"	CBS
1955 (8th)	Make Room for Daddy	"Peter Pan Meets Rusty Williams"	ABC
1955 (8th)	Producers' Showcase	"The Sleeping Beauty"	NBC
1955 (8th)	The United States Steel Hour	"No Time for Sergeants"	ABC
1955 (8th)	Wide Wide World	"The American West"	NBC
1956 (9th)
1956 (9th)	Playhouse 90	"Requiem for a Heavyweight"	CBS
1956 (9th)	Kraft Television Theatre	"A Night to Remember"	NBC
1956 (9th)	Omnibus	"Leonard Bernstein"	CBS
1956 (9th)	See It Now	"Secret Life of Danny Kaye"	CBS
1956 (9th)	Victor Borge: Comedy in Music	Variety Special	CBS
1957 (10th)
1957 (10th)	Playhouse 90	"The Comedian"	CBS
1957 (10th)	The Edsel Show	Variety Special	CBS
1957 (10th)	General Motors 50th Anniversary Show	Variety Special	NBC
1957 (10th)	Hallmark Hall of Fame	"The Green Pastures"	NBC
1957 (10th)	Playhouse 90	"The Helen Morgan Story"	CBS
1958–1959 (11th)
1958–1959 (11th)	An Evening with Fred Astaire	Variety Special	NBC
1958–1959 (11th)	Hallmark Hall of Fame	"Little Moon of Alban"	NBC
1958–1959 (11th)	Playhouse 90	"Child of Our Time"	CBS
1958–1959 (11th)	Playhouse 90	"The Old Man"	CBS

=== 1960s ===
Year	Program	Episode	Network
1959–1960 (12th)
1959–1960 (12th)	Not Awarded		
1960–1961 (13th)
1960–1961 (13th)	Hallmark Hall of Fame	"Macbeth"	NBC
1960–1961 (13th)	1960 Presidential Nominating Conventions	News Program	NBC
1960–1961 (13th)	An Hour with Danny Kaye	Variety Special	CBS
1960–1961 (13th)	Astaire Time	Variety Special	NBC
1960–1961 (13th)	NBC Sunday Showcase	"The Sacco-Venzetti Story"	NBC
1961–1962 (14th)
1961–1962 (14th)	Hallmark Hall of Fame	"Victoria Regina"	NBC
1961–1962 (14th)	Bell & Howell Close Up!	"Walk in My Shoes"	ABC
1961–1962 (14th)	CBS Reports	"Biography of a Bookie Joint"	CBS
1961–1962 (14th)	The Judy Garland Show	Variety Special	CBS
1961–1962 (14th)	Vincent Van Gogh: A Self-Portrait	Telefilm	NBC
1962–1963 (15th)
1962–1963 (15th)	The Tunnel	Documentary	NBC
1962–1963 (15th)	Alcoa Premiere	"The Voice of Charlie Pont"	ABC
1962–1963 (15th)	The Danny Kaye Show with Lucille Ball	Variety Special	NBC
1962–1963 (15th)	The Defenders	"The Madman"	CBS
1963–1964 (16th)
1963–1964 (16th)	The Making of the President 1960	Documentary	ABC
1963–1964 (16th)	The American Revolution of '63	News Program	NBC
1963–1964 (16th)	The Defenders	"Blacklist"	CBS
1963–1964 (16th)	The Kremlin	Documentary	NBC
1963–1964 (16th)	Town Meeting of the World	News Program	CBS
1964–1965 (17th)
1964–1965 (17th)	Not Awarded		
1965–1966 (18th) (Note: Limited to dramatic programs.)
1965–1966 (18th)	The Ages of Man	Telefilm	CBS
1965–1966 (18th)	Hallmark Hall of Fame	"Eagle in a Cage"	NBC
1965–1966 (18th)	Hallmark Hall of Fame	"Inherit the Wind"	NBC
1965–1966 (18th)	Slattery's People	"Rally 'Round Your Own Flag, Mister"	CBS
1966–1967 (19th)
1966–1967 (19th)	Death of a Salesman	Telefilm	CBS
1966–1967 (19th)	ABC Stage 67	"A Christmas Memory"	ABC
1966–1967 (19th)	ABC Stage 67	"The Love Song of Barney Kempinski"	ABC
1966–1967 (19th)	CBS Playhouse	"The Final War of Olly Winter"	CBS
1966–1967 (19th)	CBS Playhouse	"The Glass Menagerie"	CBS
1966–1967 (19th)	Mark Twain Tonight!	Telefilm	CBS
1967–1968 (20th)
1967–1968 (20th)	Hallmark Hall of Fame	"Elizabeth the Queen"	NBC
1967–1968 (20th)	CBS Playhouse	"Dear Friends"	CBS
1967–1968 (20th)	CBS Playhouse	"Do Not Go Gentle into that Good Night"	CBS
1967–1968 (20th)	NET Playhouse	"Uncle Vanya"	NET
1967–1968 (20th)	The Strange Case of Dr. Jekyll and Mr. Hyde	Telefilm	ABC
1967–1968 (20th)	Xerox Special	"Luther"	ABC
1968–1969 (21st)
1968–1969 (21st)	Hallmark Hall of Fame	"Teacher, Teacher"	NBC
1968–1969 (21st)	CBS Playhouse	"The People Next Door"	CBS
1968–1969 (21st)	Heidi	Telefilm	NBC
1968–1969 (21st)	A Midsummer Night's Dream	Telefilm	CBS
1968–1969 (21st)	Mission: Impossible	"The Execution"	CBS
1968–1969 (21st)	NET Playhouse	"Talking to a Stranger"	NET

=== 1970s ===
Year	Program	Episode	Network
1969–1970 (22nd)
1969–1970 (22nd)	Hallmark Hall of Fame	"A Storm in Summer"	NBC
1969–1970 (22nd)	David Copperfield	Telefilm	NBC
1969–1970 (22nd)	Marcus Welby, M.D.	"Hello, Goodbye, Hello"	ABC
1969–1970 (22nd)	My Sweet Charlie	Telefilm	NBC
1970–1971 (23rd)
1970–1971 (23rd)	The Andersonville Trial	Telefilm	PBS
1970–1971 (23rd)	Hallmark Hall of Fame	"Hamlet"	NBC
1970–1971 (23rd)	Hallmark Hall of Fame	"The Price"	NBC
1970–1971 (23rd)	Night Gallery	"They're Tearing Down Tim Riley's Bar"	NBC
1970–1971 (23rd)	Vanished	Telefilm	NBC
1971–1972 (24th)
1971–1972 (24th)	Brian's Song	Telefilm	ABC
1971–1972 (24th)	All in the Family	"Sammy's Visit"	CBS
1971–1972 (24th)	Elizabeth R	"The Lion's Cub"	PBS
1971–1972 (24th)	Hallmark Hall of Fame	"The Snow Goose"	NBC
1971–1972 (24th)	The Six Wives of Henry VIII	"Jane Seymour"	CBS
1972–1973 (25th)
1972–1973 (25th)	A War of Children	Telefilm	CBS
1972–1973 (25th)	That Certain Summer	Telefilm	ABC
1972–1973 (25th)	Long Day's Journey into Night	Telefilm	ABC
1972–1973 (25th)	The Marcus-Nelson Murders	Telefilm	CBS
1972–1973 (25th)	The Red Pony	Telefilm	NBC

== Total awards by network ==
- NBC – 8
- CBS – 5
- ABC – 3
- PBS – 1

== Programs with multiple awards ==
5 awards

- Hallmark Hall of Fame (2 consecutive; 3 consecutive)

2 awards

- Playhouse 90 (consecutive)

== Programs with multiple nominations ==
12 nominations

- Hallmark Hall of Fame (NBC)

5 nominations

- CBS Playhouse (CBS)
- Playhouse 90 (CBS)

2 nominations

- ABC Stage 67 (ABC)
- The Defenders (CBS)
- Disneyland (ABC)
- NET Playhouse (NET)
- Producers' Showcase (NBC)
