= James B. Allardice =

American television comedy writer (1919–1966)

- Born: March 20, 1919; Canton, Ohio, U.S.
- Died: February 15, 1966 (aged 46); Los Angeles, California, U.S.
- Occupations: American TV and film screenwriter/director
- Years active: 1942–1966

James Burns Allardice Jr. (March 20, 1919 – February 15, 1966) was an American television comedy writer of the 1950s and 1960s, best known for his decade-long association with Alfred Hitchcock.

== Early life and career ==
Born in Canton, Ohio, Allardice was the son of James Burns Allardice, a native of Scotland, and Lucinda (Lula) Masters Gladden. He attended McKinley High School, then the College of Wooster, where he was active in theater, collaborating on at least two musical comedies with fellow student, composer James Wise. Following his graduation in 1941, Allardice worked as a reporter for The Canton Repository for approximately one year.

During World War II he served in the US Army, rising to rank of Sergeant. Following the war, Allardice attended graduate school at Yale University and wrote the play At War with the Army under playwright Marc Connelly, who taught drama courses. At War with the Army ran 151 performances on Broadway in 1949. It was filmed in 1949 and released in 1950 in a production starring Dean Martin and Jerry Lewis.

Allardice is also known for his collaborations with writing partner Tom Adair on a number of American 1960s TV sitcoms including The Munsters, F Troop, My Three Sons, Gomer Pyle, USMC and Hogan's Heroes. In 1955, Allardice—along with Jack Douglas, Hal Kanter, and Harry Winkler—won an Emmy in the category "Best Written Comedy Material" for his work during the 1954-1955 season on NBC's new comedy series, The George Gobel Show.

He contributed to Alfred Hitchcock Presents, and wrote Hitchcock's prologues, intermissions and epilogues for all of the 359 episodes of the series, as well as many speeches for Hitchcock's public engagements.

== Personal life and death ==
Following his wartime service, Allardice married Utica, New York native and fellow Wooster alumnus Alice Neff, with whom he would have three children: a son, James, and daughters Jean and Barbara.

On February 15, 1966, Allardice died, aged 46, from a heart attack in Van Nuys, Los Angeles. Survived by his wife and children, as well as his mother and sister, Allardice was buried at Forest Lawn Memorial Cemetery.
