= An Error in Chemistry =

- Climax! episode
- Episode no.: Season 1 Episode 7
- Directed by: William H. Brown Jr.
- Teleplay by: David Dortort
- Based on: "An Error in Chemistry" by William Faulkner
- Presented by: William Lundigan
- Original air date: December 2, 1954
- Running time: 60 minutes

"An Error in Chemistry" is a 1954 American television play based on the like-named William Faulkner story, which first appeared in the June 1946 issue of Ellery Queen's Mystery Magazine. It was the seventh episode of the anthology series Climax! and starred Edmond O'Brien as Joel Flint.

The episode was broadcast live.

== Cast ==
- Edmond O'Brien as Joel Flint
- Lon Chaney as Old Man Pritchell
- Douglas Kennedy as Uncle Gavin
- Tommy Ivo as Billy Sartoris
- Margaret Field as M'Liss
- James Bell as Sheriff
- Dan White as Ben Berry
- William Schallert as Young Farmer

== Reception ==
Reviewing the episode for the New York Herald Tribune, John Crosby wrote, "this may have been the best television drama I have ever seen" (a fact he attributes equally to all parties concerned), while Hollywood Reporter critic Milton Luban's equally emphatic thumbs-up focuses primarily on Brown's "beautiful directing job, from both performance and acting viewpoints, his crowd handling being masterful," and on O'Brien's "brillian[ce]."

O'Brien has turned in far too many brilliant performances to call this his best, but it certainly ranks close to it, [...] getting every nuance out of the role yet maintaining a certain inscrutability that keeps his motives a complete mystery until the bitterly ironic climax.

Time magazine likewise singled out O'Brien's performance but deemed the story's climax "too forced and too trifling to support an hour show."

At the Seventh Annual Emmy Awards, adaptor David Dortort's script received a nomination for Best Written Dramatic Material.
