= Portrait in Celluloid (Climax!) =

- Climax! episode
- Episode no.: Season 2 Episode 11
- Directed by: John Frankenheimer
- Written by: Rod Serling
- Original air date: November 24, 1955
- Running time: 0:58:40

Guest appearances
- Jack Carson as Art Shaddick; Kim Hunter as Barbara Williams

Episode chronology
← Previous "A Promise to Murder"	Next → "Man of Taste"

"Portrait in Celluloid" was an American television movie broadcast by CBS on November 24, 1955, as part of the television series, Climax!. It was written by Rod Serling. John Frankenheimer was the director and Martin Manulis the producer. Frankenheimer was nominated for an Emmy for his direction.

== Plot ==
Art Shaddick (played by Jack Carson), was an Oscar-winning screenwriter many years ago and is now an unsuccessful, abrasive, and desperate literary agent. His secretary Barbara (played by Kim Hunter) presents him with an excellent script written by her friend, a talented young writer. Shaddick insists that the script needs rewriting and proposes to collaborate on the rewrite. Shaddick's contributions remove the script's freshness.

== Cast ==
The cast consisted of:

- Jack Carson as Art Shaddick
- Kim Hunter as Barbara Williams
- Don Taylor as John Appleby
- Audrey Totter as Edna Shaddick
- Robert F. Simon as Robert Chumley
- John Gallaudet as Boris Lotz

William Lundigan hosted the broadcast.

== Production ==
The movie was broadcast by CBS on November 24, 1955, as part of the television series, Climax!. It was written by Rod Serling. John Frankenheimer was the director and Martin Manulis the producer.

Frankenheimer received his first Emmy nomination for the production.
