= Phil Sharp (screenwriter) =

American producer and screenwriter

- Born: 1911
- Died: 1980 (aged 68–69)
- Occupation: Screenwriter
- Spouse: Barbara Avedon (divorced)

Phil Sharp (1911 – 1980) was an American producer and screenwriter. He won a Primetime Emmy Award and was nominated for another one in the category Outstanding Writing for a Comedy Series, for his work on the television programs, The Phil Silvers Show and All in the Family. Sharp died of a heart attack in 1980.
