= Person to Person =

- Logo for the 2012 version
- Genre: Interview
- Directed by: Franklin J. Schaffner (1953–1959); Bob Daily (1959–1960)
- Presented by: Edward R. Murrow (1953–1959); Charles Collingwood (1959–1961); Charlie Rose (2012); Lara Logan (2012); Norah O'Donnell (2022–present)
- Country of origin: United States
- Original language: English
- No. of seasons: 9

Production
- Executive producer: Susan Zirinsky (2012)
- Producers: John Aaron; Jesse Zousmer; Charles Hill; Robert Sammon; Edward R. Murrow
- Running time: 30 minutes (original run); 60 minutes (revival)

Original release
- Network: CBS
- Release: October 2, 1953 – September 8, 1961
- Release: February 8 – November 23, 2012

Person to Person is a television program in the United States that originally ran from 1953 to 1961, with two episodes of an attempted revival airing in 2012. Edward R. Murrow hosted the original series from its inception in 1953 until 1959, interviewing celebrities in their homes from a comfortable chair in his New York studio (his opening: "Good evening, I'm Ed Murrow. And the name of the program is 'Person to Person'. It's all live – there's no film"). In the last two years of its original run, Charles Collingwood was the host.

Although Murrow is best remembered as a reporter on programs such as Hear It Now and See It Now and for publicly confronting Senator Joseph McCarthy; on Person to Person he was a pioneer of the celebrity interview.

The program was well planned, but not strictly scripted, with as many as six cameras and TV lighting installed to cover the guest's moves through his home, and a microwave link to transmit the signals back to the network. The guests wore wireless microphones to pick up their voices as they moved around the home or its grounds. The interviews were done live. The two 15-minute interviews in each program were typically with very different types of people, such as a movie star and a scientist. Guests often used the appearance to promote their latest project or book.

== Guests ==
The first guest was Roy Campanella, who had just hit a home run to win game 3 for the Brooklyn Dodgers against the New York Yankees in the 1953 World Series. He later appeared in a wheelchair in 1959 following his automobile accident.

The long list of guests included then-Senator John F. Kennedy and his wife Jacqueline, Elizabeth Taylor, Andy Williams (1960), Dean Martin, Frank Sinatra, Leonard Bernstein and Felicia Montealegre Bernstein, Mae West, Jerry Lewis, Marlon Brando, Humphrey Bogart and Lauren Bacall, Liberace, Ethel Waters, Sammy Davis Jr., Groucho and Harpo Marx, Margaret Mead, Harry Truman, Marilyn Monroe, Milton Greene, W.C. Handy, Duke Ellington, Tallulah Bankhead, Noël Coward, Ethel Merman, Tony Curtis and Janet Leigh, Fidel Castro, Bing Crosby, Julie Newmar, Leopold Stokowski, Kirk Douglas, and John Steinbeck.

The show featuring Bing Crosby and Mary Margaret McBride in December 1954 was the first time the show appeared in the top-10 TV shows as measured by Trendex. The highest-rated featured Elizabeth Taylor, Mike Todd, and Mark Van Doren with a 35 Trendex.

== Revivals ==
On December 15, 2011, CBS News announced they would bring back the news series with Charlie Rose and Lara Logan as hosts. The network announced plans for two separately scheduled episodes, based on taped rather than live interviews. According to Susan Zirinsky, an executive producer of the new show and of 48 Hours, they "tried to stay true to Edward R. Murrow's concept. The two reporters remain in New York, and we are taken in by the artist or the newsmaker into a special place. There's an intimacy when someone allows you into their home."

The first episode, airing on February 8, 2012, featured interviews with George Clooney, Jon Bon Jovi, and Warren Buffett. The premiere attracted 5.9 million viewers, less than a third of the viewers watching American Idol and fewer than the 8.44 million who watched The Middle; it outrated One Tree Hill and Whitney, though the latter attracted a larger share of the 18–49 audience.

Had the two specially scheduled episodes been well-received, Person to Person could have become a regularly scheduled series. The second episode aired on November 23, 2012 (Black Friday), featuring Sean Penn, Alicia Keys, and Drew Brees.

In the rebranding of CBSN into CBS News in 2022, a second revival was announced to run on the service and be hosted by Norah O'Donnell.

== See also ==
- Person to Bunny, a 1960 Merrie Melodies cartoon inspired by Person to Person
