= Terry Ryan (screenwriter) =

American screenwriter

- Born: November 26, 1922; Cleveland, Ohio, U.S.
- Died: May 5, 2001 (aged 78); New York City, U.S.
- Occupation: Screenwriter
- Known for: The Phil Silvers Show

Terry Ryan (November 26, 1922 – May 5, 2001) was an American screenwriter.

== Awards and honors ==
Ryan won Emmy Awards for his work on The Phil Silvers Show in 1955 and 1957.
