= Al Gordon (screenwriter) =

American television comedy writer

Alvin Lawrence Gordon (April 21, 1923 – May 23, 2012) was an American television comedy writer. He was best known for his work on shows such as The Jack Benny Program, The Carol Burnett Show, Tony Orlando and Dawn, and Three's Company.

== Early life ==
Gordon was born in Akron, Ohio, the middle of three children born to Nathan Gordon (né Gorodetsky), a jeweler and Sylvia Gordon (née Milton), Jewish immigrants from Russia. The family relocated to The Bronx in his early childhood. He served in the Air Corps during World War II and was stationed in The Azores, where he pitched jokes to a troupe of writers stranded on the island. Post-War, these writers invited him to move to Los Angeles, where he began his comedy career in earnest.

== Career ==
After a brief stint working for Eddie Cantor, Al found work with The Jack Benny Program prior to its move to television. With partner Hal Goldman, he co-ran the radio show when Benny transitioned to television. Gordon, along with Goldman and the other Benny writers, received both the 1959 and 1960 Emmy Award for Outstanding Writing in a Comedy Series. Both Gordon and Goldman continued to work for Benny until his death in 1974.

In addition to his work for Benny, Gordon worked on dozens of other projects, including The Carol Burnett Show, 227, and The Smothers Brothers Comedy Hour, where a young Steve Martin got his start. Gordon also won the 1966 Primetime Emmy for Outstanding Writing Achievement in Variety for a Carol Channing special, An Evening With Carol Channing. He was nominated for seven other Emmys.

Notably, throughout his career, Al was employed for every single television season until his retirement.

== Personal life ==
Gordon married Charlotte (née Berkus), a first cousin, once removed of Nate Berkus, and together, they had two children: Neil Gordon (b. 1953), a television director, and Jill (b. 1955), a television writer. His granddaughter, Victoria Gordon, is also a comedy writer and performer.

Gordon retired in the early 1990s and spent much of the 90s and early 2000s as a caregiver to his wife, who had Alzheimer's disease. She was a resident of the Motion Picture & Television Country House and Hospital until her death in 2008.

Al's death was announced in May 2012.
