= Coleman Jacoby =

American comedy writer

- Born: Coleman Jacobs; April 16, 1915; Pittsburgh, Pennsylvania, U.S.
- Died: October 20, 2010 (aged 95); East Meadow, New York, U.S.
- Occupation(s): Radio and television comedy writer
- Spouse(s): • Violeta Velero (married 1940; divorced) • Gaby Monet (her death)
- Children: One daughter

Coleman Jacoby (April 16, 1915 – October 20, 2010) was an American comedy writer for radio and television.

== Early life ==
Born Coleman Jacobs in Pittsburgh, Pennsylvania, his mother died when he was young and his father abandoned the family. Because of this, he was raised at the Jewish Home for Babies and Children from age 7.

== Career ==
After studying art, he moved to New York City, New York, where he worked in a parking lot, was a doorman at a cafe and painted murals for nightclubs. He also started writing jokes for comedians. Joke writing for Bob Hope and Fred Allen paved the way for steady work in radio. He changed his name to Jacoby on the recommendation of columnist Earl Wilson.

He wrote for Sid Caesar and Imogene Coca on Your Show of Shows. Later, after teaming up with his longtime partner Arnie Rosen, he wrote extensively for Jackie Gleason and Art Carney. The team also wrote for Phil Silvers's character Sergeant Ernie Bilko for You'll Never Get Rich (later renamed The Phil Silvers Show).

== Personal life ==
Jacoby was married twice, first to Violetta Velero in 1940, from whom he divorced, and later to Gaby Monet, who predeceased him. He had one daughter.

He died of pancreatic cancer in East Meadow, New York.

== See also ==
- Lists of American writers
- List of Long Islanders
- List of people from the Pittsburgh metropolitan area
