= Harry Winkler (writer) =

American sitcom writer

Harry Winkler (December 21, 1915 – February 19, 1981) was an American sitcom writer who wrote for such shows as The George Gobel Show, The Addams Family, The Doris Day Show, and others. He shared an Emmy award in 1955 for The George Gobel Show and was nominated for the same show the following year. In that same year, 1956, one of his television scripts was featured in The Prize Plays of Television and Radio 1956, published by Random House.

Winkler also wrote the groundbreaking series Julia, starring Diahann Carroll. It was the first commercial television series to star an African-American female in the lead role of a single, professional woman with a family to support. He also wrote the original treatment "The Flagstones" for what ultimately became known as The Flintstones. Additional credits include being the ghostwriter for the Blondie comic strip series for over 25 years, from 1955 through 1980. He also wrote various comedy series, from Petticoat Junction to The Brady Bunch to The Odd Couple.

In 2014, Winkler received a posthumous award from the Writers Guild of America for his work on The Odd Couple television series. The script for this series was designated one of the top 100 television screenplays during the first 75 years of commercial television. Winkler also authorized three novels and a theatrical play, Edges.
