= Tony Webster (screenwriter) =

American screenwriter (1922–1987)

Tony Webster (January 9, 1922 – June 26, 1987) was an American screenwriter.

He wrote for Sid Caesar's Your Show of Shows, The Phil Silvers Show, Car 54, Where Are You? and The Love Boat. He died of esophagus cancer at his home in Beverly Hills, California, at the age 65.
