= George Balzer =

American screenwriter and television producer

- Born: September 1, 1915; Erie, Pennsylvania, U.S.
- Died: September 28, 2006 (aged 91); Van Nuys, California
- Occupation: Radio/TV Writer

George Balzer (September 1, 1915 - September 28, 2006) was an American screenwriter and television producer.

== Biography ==
Balzer was born to a Roman Catholic family in Erie, Pennsylvania, and spent most of his career writing for Jack Benny. He died In September 2006 at age 91, in Van Nuys, California.

Balzer wrote the book for the Broadway play Are You With It? (1945).
