= Hal Goldman =

American Emmy Award winning screenwriter

- Born: December 5, 1919; St. Paul, Minnesota
- Died: June 27, 2001 (aged 81); Los Angeles, California
- Occupations: Screenwriter, television director
- Awards: Three Emmy Awards

Harold "Hal" Goldman (December 5, 1919 – June 27, 2001) was an American Emmy Award-winning screenwriter, television director.
