= Sam Perrin =

American screenwriter (1901–1988)

Sam Perrin (August 15, 1901 – January 8, 1998) was an American screenwriter.

Perrin was born to a Jewish family. He died in Woodland Hills, Los Angeles, California.
