= See It Now =

1951 American newsmagazine and TV documentary series

- Genre: Newsmagazine; Documentary
- Created by: Fred W. Friendly; Edward R. Murrow
- Presented by: Edward R. Murrow
- Country of origin: United States
- Original language: English

Production
- Running time: 45–48 minutes
- Production company: Columbia Broadcasting System

Original release
- Network: CBS
- Release: November 18, 1951 – July 7, 1958

See It Now is an American newsmagazine and documentary series broadcast by CBS from 1951 to 1958. It was created by Edward R. Murrow and Fred W. Friendly, with Murrow as the host of the show. From 1952 to 1957, See It Now won four Emmy Awards, and was nominated three other times. It also won a 1951 Peabody Award. The program was based on Murrow's earlier radio show Hear It Now.

== Second Red Scare ==
Murrow produced a number of episodes of the show that dealt with the Second Red Scare (1947–57) (one of the more notable episodes resulted in a U.S. military officer, Milo Radulovich, being acquitted, after being charged with supporting Communism), before embarking on a broadcast on March 9, 1954.

== Production ==
Don Hewitt was the director. Aluminum Company of America (ALCOA) sponsored the program.

== 2000s ==
In September 2006, "See It Now" became the slogan for a relaunched CBS Evening News with new anchor Katie Couric.
