= List of Primetime Emmy Awards ceremonies =

This is a list of Primetime Emmy Awards ceremonies, the years which they were honoring, their hosts, and their ceremony dates.

== List of ceremonies ==
#	Date	Year	Host(s)	Network	Site	Most-awarded program(s)	U.S. viewers (millions)	Ref.
1st	January 25, 1949	1948	Walter O'Keefe	KTSL	Hollywood Athletic Club	Pantomime Quiz; Your Show Time	—N/a	
2nd	January 27, 1950	1949	Dick Lane; Bill Welsh	KFI	Ambassador Hotel	The Ed Wynn Show; Texaco Star Theater	—N/a	
3rd	January 23, 1951	1950	Syd Cassyd	KLAC	Ambassador Hotel	The Alan Young Show	—N/a	
4th	February 18, 1952	1951	Lucille Ball; Desi Arnaz	KECA	Cocoanut Grove	Your Show of Shows	—N/a	
5th	February 3, 1953	1952	Art Linkletter	KLAC	Hotel Statler	I Love Lucy	—N/a	
6th	February 11, 1954	1953	Ed Sullivan	KHJ	Hollywood Palladium	I Love Lucy; See It Now; The United States Steel Hour	—N/a	
7th	March 7, 1955	1954	Steve Allen (LA); Dave Garroway (NY)	NBC	Moulin Rouge Nightclub (LA); Nino's LaRue (NY)	Studio One	—N/a	
8th	March 17, 1956	1955	Art Linkletter (LA); Danny Thomas (NY)	NBC	Pan-Pacific Auditorium (LA); Grand Ballroom, Waldorf Astoria (NY)	The Phil Silvers Show; Producers' Showcase	—N/a	
9th	March 16, 1957	1956	Desi Arnaz	NBC	NBC Studios (LA & NY)	Caesar's Hour; Playhouse 90	—N/a	
10th	April 15, 1958	1957	Danny Thomas (LA); Phil Silvers (NY)	NBC	Cocoanut Grove (LA); Seventh Regiment Armory (NY)	Playhouse 90	—N/a	
11th	May 6, 1959	1958–59	Raymond Burr	NBC	Moulin Rouge Nightclub (LA); Ziegfeld Theatre (NY); Mayflower Hotel (DC)	An Evening with Fred Astaire	—N/a	
12th	June 20, 1960	1959–60	Fred Astaire (LA); Arthur Godfrey (NY)	NBC	NBC Studios (LA); Ziegfeld Theatre (NY)	The Jack Benny Show; The Moon and Sixpence	—N/a	
13th	May 16, 1961	1960–61	Dick Powell (LA); Joey Bishop (NY)	NBC	Moulin Rouge Nightclub (LA); Ziegfeld Theatre (NY)	Hallmark Hall of Fame: "Macbeth"	—N/a	
14th	May 22, 1962	1961–62	Bob Newhart (LA); Johnny Carson (NY); David Brinkley (DC)	NBC	Hollywood Palladium (LA); Hotel Astor (NY); Sheraton Park Hotel (DC)	The Defenders	—N/a	
15th	May 26, 1963	1962–63	Joey Bishop (LA); Arthur Godfrey (NY); Chet Huntley (DC)	NBC	Hollywood Palladium (LA); Americana Hotel (NY); Sheraton Park Hotel (DC)	The Defenders	—N/a	
16th	May 25, 1964	1963–64	Joey Bishop (LA); E. G. Marshall (NY)	NBC	Hollywood Palladium (LA); Texas Pavilion (NY)	The Dick Van Dyke Show	—N/a	
17th	September 12, 1965	1964–65	Danny Thomas (LA); Sammy Davis Jr. (NY)	NBC	Hollywood Palladium (LA); New York Hilton (NY)	Hallmark Hall of Fame: "The Magnificent Yankee"	—N/a	
18th	May 22, 1966	1965–66	Danny Kaye (LA); Bill Cosby (NY)	CBS	Hollywood Palladium (LA); Americana Hotel (NY)	The Dick Van Dyke Show	—N/a	
19th	June 4, 1967	1966–67	Joey Bishop; Hugh Downs	ABC	The Century Plaza Hotel (LA); Americana Hotel (NY)	Mission: Impossible	—N/a	
20th	May 19, 1968	1967–68	Frank Sinatra; Dick Van Dyke	NBC	Hollywood Palladium (LA); Americana Hotel (NY)	Get Smart	—N/a	
21st	June 8, 1969	1968–69	Bill Cosby (LA); Merv Griffin (NY)	CBS	Santa Monica Civic Auditorium (LA); Carnegie Hall (NY)	CBS Playhouse: "The People Next Door"	—N/a	
22nd	June 7, 1970	1969–70	Bill Cosby (LA); Dick Cavett (NY)	ABC	The Century Plaza Hotel (LA); Carnegie Hall (NY)	Marcus Welby, M.D.; Room 222	—N/a	
23rd	May 9, 1971	1970–71	Johnny Carson	NBC	Hollywood Palladium	The Bold Ones: The Senator; The Mary Tyler Moore Show	—N/a	
24th	May 14, 1972	1971–72	Johnny Carson	CBS	Hollywood Palladium	All in the Family	—N/a	
25th	May 20, 1973	1972–73	Johnny Carson	ABC	Shubert Theatre	The Waltons	—N/a	
26th	May 28, 1974	1973–74	Johnny Carson	NBC	Pantages Theatre	The Autobiography of Miss Jane Pittman; The Carol Burnett Show	—N/a	
27th	May 19, 1975	1974–75	—N/a	CBS	Hollywood Palladium	The Mary Tyler Moore Show	30.83	
28th	May 17, 1976	1975–76	John Denver; Mary Tyler Moore	ABC	Shubert Theatre	The Mary Tyler Moore Show	31.38	
29th	September 11, 1977	1976–77	Robert Blake; Angie Dickinson	NBC	Pasadena Civic Auditorium	Roots	—N/a	
30th	September 17, 1978	1977–78	Alan Alda	CBS	Pasadena Civic Auditorium	All in the Family; Holocaust	—N/a	
31st	September 9, 1979	1978–79	Cheryl Ladd; Henry Winkler	ABC	Pasadena Civic Auditorium	All in the Family; Friendly Fire; The Jericho Mile; Lou Grant; Roots: The Next Generations; Taxi	—N/a	
32nd	September 7, 1980	1979–80	Steve Allen; Dick Clark	NBC	Pasadena Civic Auditorium	Lou Grant	—N/a	
33rd	September 13, 1981	1980–81	Ed Asner; Shirley MacLaine	CBS	Pasadena Civic Auditorium	Hill Street Blues	—N/a	
34th	September 19, 1982	1981–82	John Forsythe; Marlo Thomas	ABC	Pasadena Civic Auditorium	Hill Street Blues	33.01	
35th	September 25, 1983	1982–83	Eddie Murphy; Joan Rivers	NBC	Pasadena Civic Auditorium	Cheers	24.50	
36th	September 23, 1984	1983–84	Tom Selleck	CBS	Pasadena Civic Auditorium	Hill Street Blues	20.28	
37th	September 22, 1985	1984–85	John Forsythe	ABC	Pasadena Civic Auditorium	Cagney & Lacey	—N/a	
38th	September 21, 1986	1985–86	David Letterman; Shelley Long	NBC	Pasadena Civic Auditorium	Cagney & Lacey	35.79	
39th	September 20, 1987	1986–87	Bruce Willis	Fox	Pasadena Civic Auditorium	Promise	14.38	
40th	August 28, 1988	1987–88	—N/a	Fox	Pasadena Civic Auditorium	Thirtysomething	15.43	
41st	September 17, 1989	1988–89	John Larroquette	Fox	Pasadena Civic Auditorium	Cheers	17.23	
42nd	September 16, 1990	1989–90	Candice Bergen; Jay Leno; Jane Pauley	Fox	Pasadena Civic Auditorium	L.A. Law	12.3	
43rd	August 25, 1991	1990–91	Jamie Lee Curtis; Dennis Miller; Jerry Seinfeld	Fox	Pasadena Civic Auditorium	Cheers	18.51	
44th	August 30, 1992	1991–92	Tim Allen; Kirstie Alley; Dennis Miller	Fox	Pasadena Civic Auditorium	Miss Rose White; Murphy Brown; Northern Exposure	20.41	
45th	September 19, 1993	1992–93	Angela Lansbury	ABC	Pasadena Civic Auditorium	Picket Fences; The Positively True Adventures of the Alleged Texas Cheerleader-Murdering Mom; Seinfeld	18.9	
46th	September 11, 1994	1993–94	Ellen DeGeneres; Patricia Richardson	ABC	Pasadena Civic Auditorium	Frasier	21.3	
47th	September 10, 1995	1994–95	Jason Alexander; Cybill Shepherd	Fox	Pasadena Civic Auditorium	Frasier	18.04	
48th	September 8, 1996	1995–96	Michael J. Fox; Paul Reiser; Oprah Winfrey	ABC	Pasadena Civic Auditorium	Dennis Miller Live; Frasier; Gulliver's Travels; Kennedy Center Honors; Picket Fences; Rasputin: Dark Servant of Destiny	20.58	
49th	September 14, 1997	1996–97	Bryant Gumbel	CBS	Pasadena Civic Auditorium	NYPD Blue	18.77	
50th	September 13, 1998	1997–98	—N/a	NBC	Shrine Auditorium	Frasier; George Wallace; NYPD Blue	19.36	
51st	September 12, 1999	1998–99	Jenna Elfman; David Hyde Pierce	Fox	Shrine Auditorium	The Practice	17.5	
52nd	September 10, 2000	1999–2000	Garry Shandling	ABC	Shrine Auditorium	The West Wing	21.8	
53rd	November 4, 2001 (Note: The ceremony was originally scheduled for September 16, 2001, but was postponed due to the September 11 attacks. The ceremony was then rescheduled for October 7, 2001, but was delayed again due to the start of the U.S. invasion of Afghanistan.)	2000–01	Ellen DeGeneres	CBS	Shubert Theatre (Note: The ceremony was originally scheduled to be held at the Shrine Auditorium, but the venue was changed due to the postponements.)	The West Wing	17.1	
54th	September 22, 2002	2001–02	Conan O'Brien	NBC	Shrine Auditorium	The West Wing	20.0	
55th	September 21, 2003	2002–03	—N/a	Fox	Shrine Auditorium	Door to Door; Everybody Loves Raymond; The Sopranos	17.7	
56th	September 19, 2004	2003–04	Garry Shandling	ABC	Shrine Auditorium	Angels in America	13.8	
57th	September 18, 2005	2004–05	Ellen DeGeneres	CBS	Shrine Auditorium	Everybody Loves Raymond; The Life and Death of Peter Sellers	18.7	
58th	August 27, 2006	2005–06	Conan O'Brien	NBC	Shrine Auditorium	Elizabeth I	16.1	
59th	September 16, 2007	2006–07	Ryan Seacrest	Fox	Shrine Auditorium	Broken Trail; Prime Suspect: The Final Act; The Sopranos; Tony Bennett: An American Classic	13.06	
60th	September 21, 2008	2007–08	Tom Bergeron; Heidi Klum; Howie Mandel; Jeff Probst; Ryan Seacrest	ABC	Peacock Theater (Note: Known as the Nokia Theatre until June 2015, then as the Microsoft Theater until July 2023.)	John Adams	12.2	
61st	September 20, 2009	2008–09	Neil Patrick Harris	CBS	Peacock Theater	30 Rock; Grey Gardens; Little Dorrit	13.47	
62nd	August 29, 2010	2009–10	Jimmy Fallon	NBC	Peacock Theater	Temple Grandin	13.50	
63rd	September 18, 2011	2010–11	Jane Lynch	Fox	Peacock Theater	Modern Family	12.44	
64th	September 23, 2012	2011–12	Jimmy Kimmel	ABC	Peacock Theater	Game Change; Homeland; Modern Family	13.26	
65th	September 22, 2013	2012–13	Neil Patrick Harris	CBS	Peacock Theater	Behind the Candelabra	17.63	
66th	August 25, 2014	2013–14	Seth Meyers	NBC	Peacock Theater	Breaking Bad	15.59	
67th	September 20, 2015	2014–15	Andy Samberg	Fox	Peacock Theater	Olive Kitteridge	11.87	
68th	September 18, 2016	2015–16	Jimmy Kimmel	ABC	Peacock Theater	The People v. O. J. Simpson: American Crime Story	11.30	
69th	September 17, 2017	2016–17	Stephen Colbert	CBS	Peacock Theater	Big Little Lies; The Handmaid's Tale	11.38	
70th	September 17, 2018	2017–18	Michael Che; Colin Jost	NBC	Peacock Theater	The Marvelous Mrs. Maisel	10.17	
71st	September 22, 2019	2018–19	—N/a	Fox	Peacock Theater	Fleabag	6.98	
72nd	September 20, 2020	2019–20	Jimmy Kimmel	ABC	Staples Center (Note: The ceremony was originally scheduled to be held at the Microsoft Theater, but the venue was changed due to the COVID-19 pandemic; nominees attended virtually from their homes or other locations.)	Schitt's Creek	6.36	
73rd	September 19, 2021	2020–21	Cedric the Entertainer	CBS/Paramount+	The Event Deck at L.A. Live (Note: The ceremony was originally scheduled to be held at the Microsoft Theater, but the venue was changed due to the COVID-19 pandemic.)	The Crown	7.83	
74th	September 12, 2022	2021–22	Kenan Thompson	NBC/Peacock	Peacock Theater	The White Lotus	5.92	
75th	January 15, 2024 (Note: The ceremony was originally scheduled for September 18, 2023, but was postponed due to the 2023 Hollywood labor disputes.)	2022–23	Anthony Anderson	Fox	Peacock Theater	The Bear; Succession	4.46	
76th	September 15, 2024	2023–24	Eugene Levy; Dan Levy	ABC	Peacock Theater	Baby Reindeer; The Bear; Shōgun	6.90	
77th	September 14, 2025	2024–25	Nate Bargatze	CBS/Paramount+	Peacock Theater	Adolescence	7.59	
78th	September 14, 2026	2025–26	Mariska Hargitay	NBC/Peacock	Peacock Theater	Widow's Bay		
79th		2026–27		Prime Video				
