= Emmy Awards =

American television awards

- Awarded for: Excellence in the world of television industry
- Country: United States
- Presented by: ATAS/NATAS/IATAS
- First award: January 25, 1949; 77 years ago
- Website: televisionacademy.com/awards; emmyonline.tv; iemmys.tv

The Emmy Awards, or Emmys, are an extensive range of awards for artistic and technical merit for the television industry. A number of annual Emmy Award ceremonies are held throughout the year, each with their own set of rules and award categories. The two events that receive the most media coverage are the Primetime Emmy Awards and the Daytime Emmy Awards, which recognize outstanding work in American primetime and daytime entertainment programming, respectively. Other notable American national Emmy events include the Children's & Family Emmy Awards for children's and family-oriented television programming, the Sports Emmy Awards for sports programming, News and Documentary Emmy Awards for news and documentary shows, and the Technology & Engineering Emmy Awards and the Primetime Engineering Emmy Awards for technological and engineering achievements. Regional Emmy Awards are also presented throughout the country at various times through the year, recognizing excellence in local television. In addition, the International Emmy Awards honor excellence in TV programming produced and initially aired outside the United States.

The Emmy statuette, depicting a winged woman holding an atom, is named after "immy", an informal term for the image orthicon tube that was common in early television cameras. It is considered one of the four major annual American entertainment awards, along with the Grammy for music, the Oscar (Academy Award) for film, and the Tony for Broadway theater.

The Emmys are presented by three related, but separate, organizations: the Academy of Television Arts & Sciences (ATAS), the National Academy of Television Arts & Sciences (NATAS), and the International Academy of Television Arts and Sciences (IATAS). Each of these three organizations is responsible for administering a particular set of Emmy Award ceremonies. The ATAS first awarded Emmys in 1949 to honor shows produced in the Los Angeles area before it became a national event in the 1950s to honor programs aired nationwide. Over the next two decades, the ATAS, the NATAS, and the IATAS expanded the award to honor other sectors of the TV industry.

== History ==
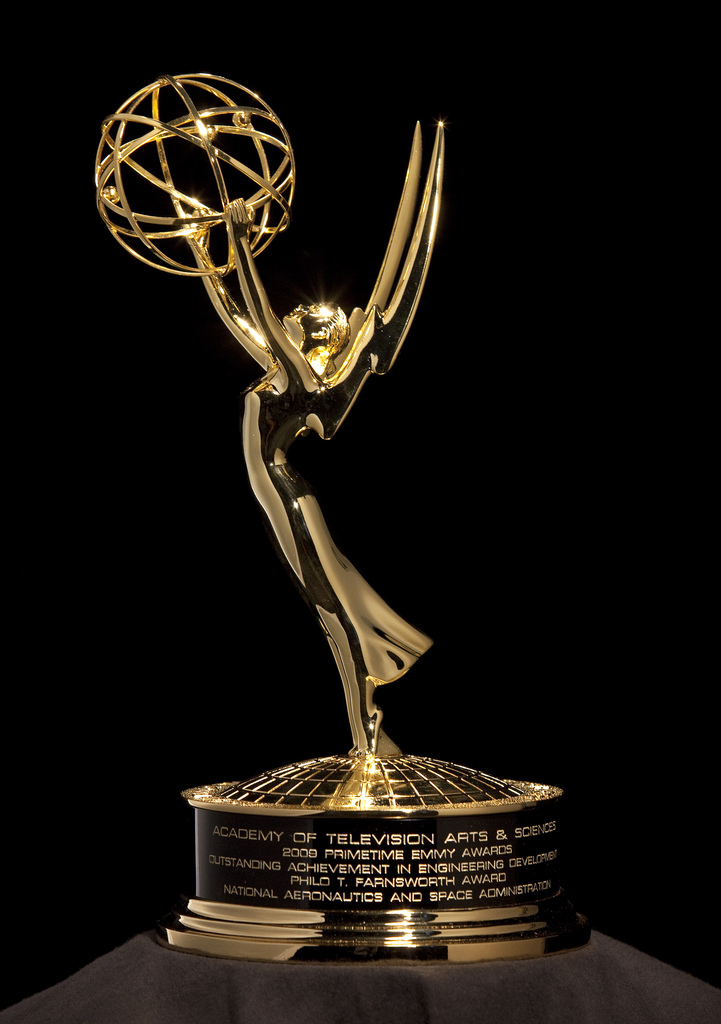
NASA Television's 2009 Philo T. Farnsworth Primetime Emmy trophy

The Los Angeles–based Academy of Television Arts & Sciences (ATAS) established the Emmy Award as part of an image-building and public relations opportunity. The first Emmy ceremony took place on January 25, 1949, at the Hollywood Athletic Club, but solely to honor shows produced and aired locally in the Los Angeles area. Shirley Dinsdale has the distinction of receiving the first Emmy Award for Most Outstanding Television Personality, during that first awards ceremony. The term "Emmy" derives from "Immy", the television industry slang for a TV camera image orthicon tube.

In the 1950s, the ATAS expanded the Emmys into a national event to honor shows aired nationwide on broadcast television. In 1955, the National Academy of Television Arts and Sciences (NATAS) was formed in New York City as a sister organization to serve members on the East Coast. While the ATAS maintained a separate ceremony to honor shows aired locally in the Los Angeles area, the NATAS established regional chapters throughout the rest of the United States, with each one developing their own local Emmy ceremony for local programming. The International Academy of Television Arts and Sciences (IATAS) was then initially founded as the International Council of the NATAS in 1969 to expose the importance of television as a global concept. The IATAS began operating its own board separately from the NATAS, and held the first International Emmy Awards ceremony in 1973.

Originally, there was only one Emmy event held per year to honor shows nationally broadcast in the United States. In 1974, the first Daytime Emmy ceremony was held to specifically honor achievement in national daytime programming. Other area-specific national Emmy events soon followed. Meanwhile, all Emmys awarded prior to the emergence of these separate, area-specific events are listed along with the Primetime Emmy Awards in the ATAS's official records.

In 1977, due to various conflicts, the ATAS and the NATAS broke ties. They agreed to share ownership of the Emmy statue and trademark, with each responsible for administering a specific set of award events. There was an exception regarding the Engineering Awards (those honoring individuals, companies, or scientific or technical organizations in recognition of significant developments and contributions to the engineering and technological aspects of television): The NATAS continues to administer the Technology & Engineering Emmy Awards, while the ATAS holds the separate Primetime Engineering Emmy Awards.

With the rise of cable television in the 1980s, cable programs first became eligible for the Primetime Emmys in 1988, and the Daytime Emmys in 1989. In 2011 ABC cancelled the soap operas All My Children and One Life to Live, and sold the two shows' licensing rights to the production company Prospect Park so they could be continued on streaming television; this prompted NATAS to create a new Daytime Emmys category for the 2013 ceremony to honor such web-only series. The ATAS also began accepting original online-only streaming television programs in 2013.

In December 2021, the ATAS and the NATAS announced a major realignment of the national Emmy Award ceremonies in response to the growth of streaming television programs, blurring the lines in determining which shows fall under Daytime or Primetime. Each of the ceremonies' scopes would now revolve around factors such as the themes and frequency of such programming, rather than dayparts. Among the major changes, daytime dramas would remain in the Daytime Emmys but most other scripted dramas and comedies would move to the Primetime Emmys, all children's programming would move to the newly created Children's & Family Emmys that the NATAS previously announced in November 2021, morning shows would move from the Daytime Emmys to the News & Documentary Emmys, and talk shows would now be divided between the Daytime and Primetime Emmys based on "format and style characteristics reflective of current programming in the daytime or late night space". The realignment of game shows and instructional programming categories was determined later in 2023.

In June 2026, the ATAS and the NATAS announced that they have begun exploratory discussions to re-merge.

== Statuette ==
The Emmy statuette, depicting a winged woman holding an atom, was designed by television engineer Louis McManus, who used his wife as the model. The ATAS rejected forty-seven proposals before settling on McManus's design in 1948. The statuette "has since become the symbol of the TV Academy's goal of supporting and uplifting the art and science of television: The wings represent the muse of art; the atom the electron of science."

When deciding a name for the award, ATAS founder Syd Cassyd originally suggested "Ike", the nickname for the television iconoscope tube. "Ike" was also the popular nickname of World War II hero and future U.S. President Dwight D. Eisenhower, and the ATAS members wanted something unique. Finally, television engineer and the third academy president Harry Lubcke suggested the name "Immy", a term commonly used for the image orthicon tube used in the early cameras. After "Immy" was chosen, it was later feminized to Emmy to match their female statuette.

The weight and dimensions of the Emmy statuette vary among the events. Each Primetime Emmy statuette weighs six pounds twelve and a half ounces (3.08 kg), and is made of copper, nickel, silver, and gold. The statue stands 15.5 inches (39 cm) tall with a base diameter of 7.5 inches (19 cm) and weight of 88 ounces (2.5 kg). The Regional Emmy Award statuette is 11.5 inches (29 cm) tall with a base diameter of 5.5 inches (14 cm) and weight of 48 ounces (1.4 kg). Each takes five and a half hours to make and is handled with white gloves to prevent fingerprints. The Primetime Emmy statues are manufactured by R.S. Owens & Company based in Chicago, Illinois, which was also charged with manufacturing the Academy Award statues until 2016, when AMPAS switched to Polich Tallix in Walden, New York. The Regional Emmy Awards are made by both R.S. Owens & Company and Society Awards, a New York–based company that also makes the Golden Globe Awards.

As its trademark owners, the ATAS and the NATAS hold firm rules on the use of the "Emmy" image as well as its name. For example, the Emmy statuette must always appear facing left. Any copyright notice for the statue should read "ATAS/NATAS", listing both academies. Academy members must also obtain permission to use the statue image or name for promotional uses even though they are winners of the award. Furthermore, DVDs of Emmy-winning shows may reference the fact that they received an Emmy, but cannot use the statue image unless it is capable of being removed from all copies one year after the award is presented.

== Types ==
Emmy events (partial list)
Administering academy	Events
ATAS	Primetime, Creative Arts, Primetime Engineering, Los Angeles Area, College TV
NATAS	Daytime, Daytime Creative Arts, Children's & Family, Sports, News & Documentary, Technology & Engineering, Regional (except for Los Angeles), National Student Production
IATAS	International

Various Emmy events competitions are held annually throughout the calendar year, ranging from honoring nationally televised shows to regionally and locally produced programs. Each event has its own set of award categories, nominating and voting procedures, and rules regarding voting committees, among others. It is not uncommon for one event to have some of the same category names that another event uses. (e.g. Primetime Emmy for Outstanding Drama Series and Daytime Emmy Award for Outstanding Drama Series).

A show that enters one of the Emmy events generally cannot also be entered into any of the others. For example, syndicated shows whose air times vary between media markets may be eligible for both the Daytime and Primetime Emmys, but cannot enter in both. In general, a show is considered national if it reaches more than 50 percent of U.S. households; programs that do not reach at least 50 percent of the country may enter into the Regional Emmys instead. Streaming television shows are treated similarly to syndicated shows: they must be available for downloading or streaming by more than 50 percent of the US national market to be eligible in one of the national Emmy competitions, and they can only enter into one of those national Emmy ceremonies. And a primetime show that is a co-production between U.S. and overseas companies might be eligible for both the Primetime and International Emmys, but also cannot enter in both.

Regardless of which area-specific competitions in which one wins an Emmy, all winners are called an "Emmy Winner". Nevertheless, some distinguish the Primetime Emmys as superior to the other Emmy competitions.

=== Primetime ===
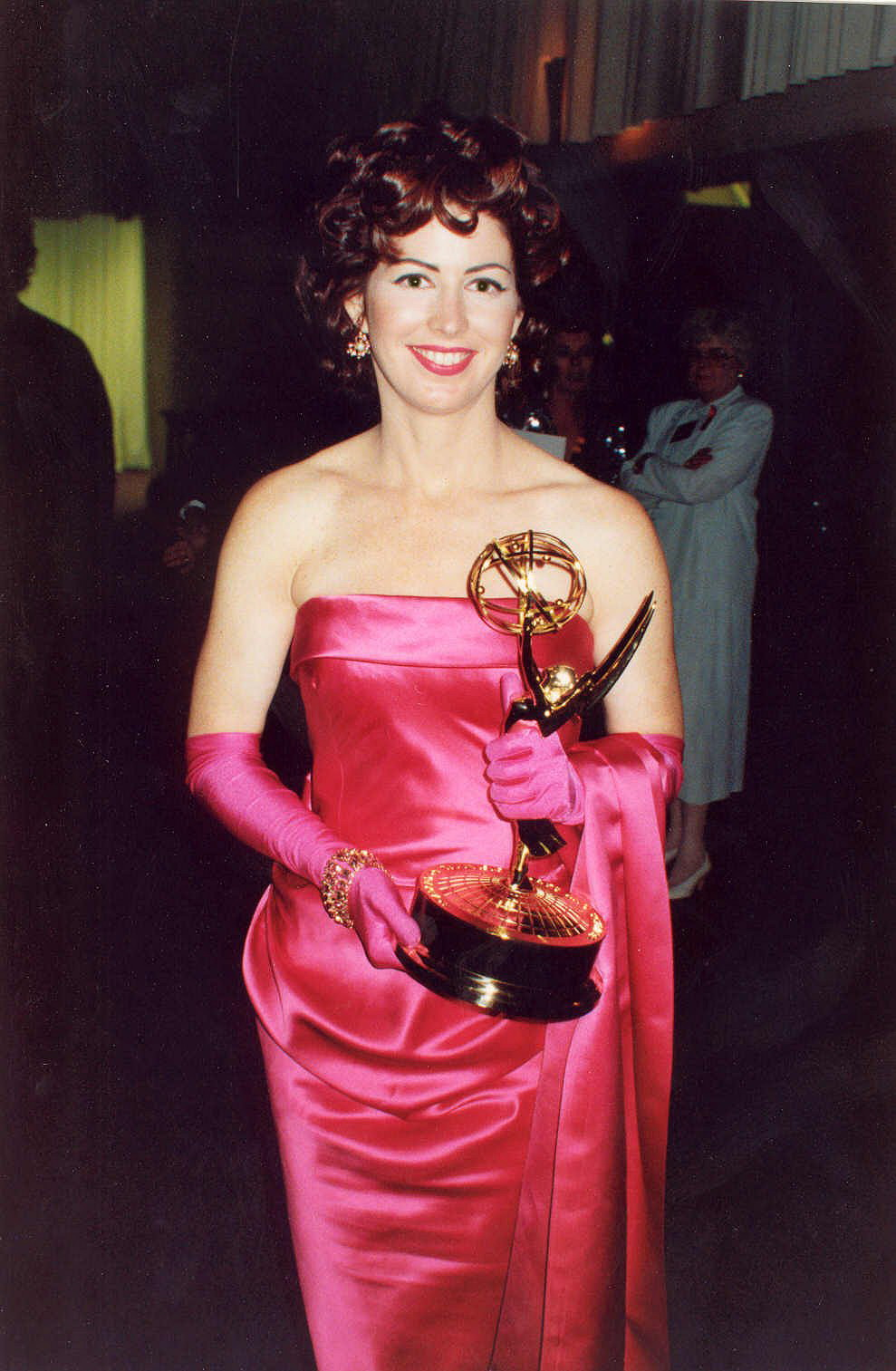
Actress Dana Delany holding a Primetime Emmy Award in 1992

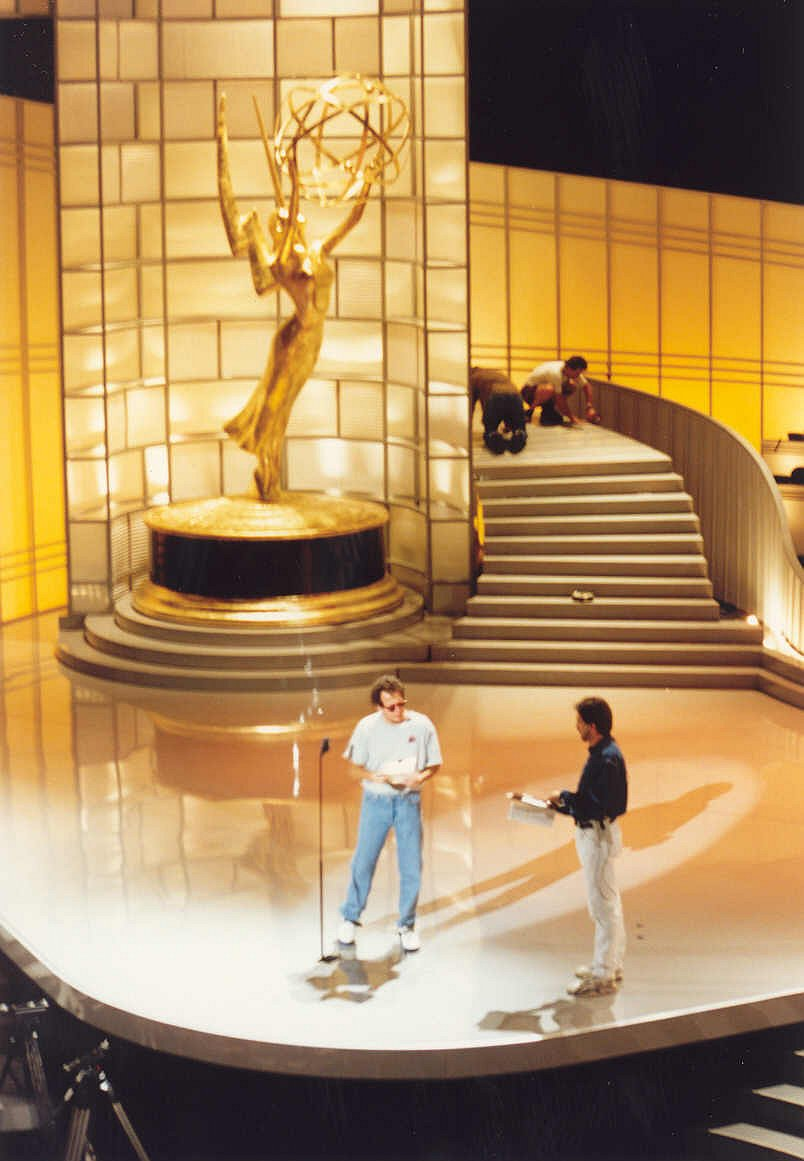
Comedian Garry Shandling during the rehearsal of the 45th Primetime Emmy Awards, in September 1993

The Primetime Emmys are presented in recognition of excellence in American primetime television programming. Ceremonies generally are held in mid-September, on the Sunday before the official start of the fall television season, and are currently broadcast in rotation among the ABC, CBS, NBC, and Fox networks, each network taking turns to air the ceremony every four years.

Some award categories presented to behind-the-scenes personnel such as art directors, costume designers, cinematographers, casting directors, and sound designers are awarded at a separate Creative Arts Emmys ceremony held a few days earlier.

The Primetime Emmys are run and voted on by members of the ATAS. For most categories, members from each of the ATAS's branches vote around June to determine the nominees only in their respective categories. All members can vote for nominations in the best program categories. The final voting to determine the winners is held in August.

=== Daytime ===
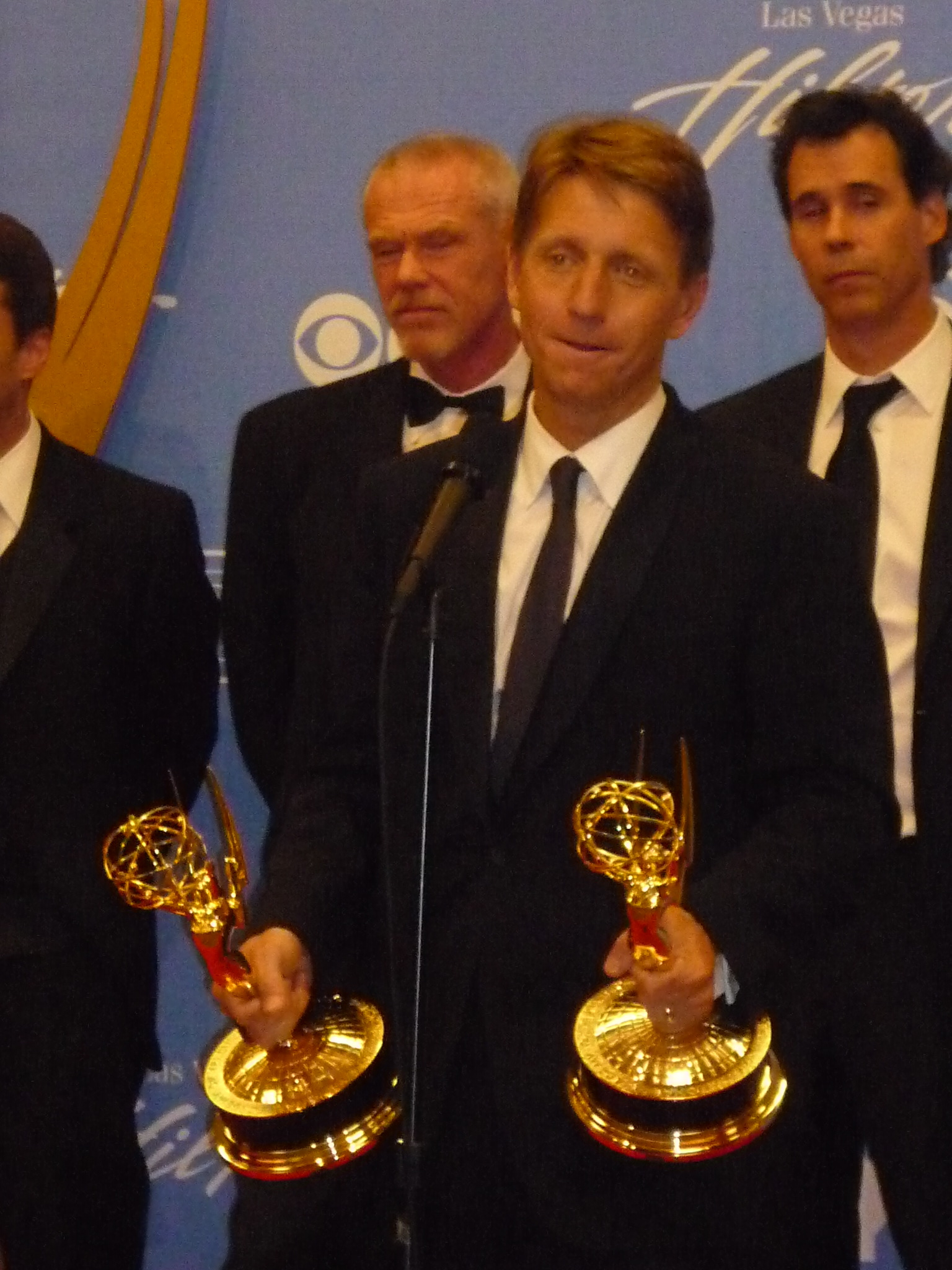
TV producer and writer Bradley Bell accepting Daytime Emmy Awards for his work on the daytime soap opera The Bold and the Beautiful in 2010

The Daytime Emmy Awards, generally held in May or June, are presented in recognition of excellence in American daytime television programming. The awards ceremony traditionally took place in May or June; in 2025 it was moved to October. The first daytime-themed Emmy Awards were given out at the primetime ceremony in 1972, but the first separate awards show made just for daytime programming was not held until 1974.

Like the Primetime Emmys, a separate Creative Arts Emmy ceremony is also held a few days earlier to honor the behind-the-scenes personnel working in daytime television.

The Daytime Emmys are run and voted on by members of the NATAS. Voting is done by peer judging panels. Any active member of the NATAS who has national credits for at least two years and within the last five years is eligible to be a judge. Depending on the category, voting is done using either a ratings score criteria or a preferential scoring system. All the drama acting categories have an additional preliminary voting round called the pre-nominations, where one or two actors from each show is selected to then move on and be considered for the primary nominations for the awards.

=== Sports ===
The Sports Emmy Awards are presented by the NATAS for excellence in sports programming. The awards ceremony takes place every Spring, usually sometime in the last two weeks in April or the first week in May and is held on a Monday night in New York City.

Voting is done by peer judging panels. The NATAS solicits anybody with significant experience in national sports production to serve as judges. The panels are organized so that they only have one representative from each corporate entity (i.e. Paramount Global, Disney, NBCUniversal, Fox Corporation, Warner Bros. Discovery etc.) Most categories only have a single voting round using preferential scoring system. The top 5 entries in each category are announced as the nominations, and then the top entry is announced as the Emmy winner later at the awards ceremony.

=== News and documentary ===
The News & Documentary Emmy Awards are presented by the NATAS for excellence in national news and documentary programming. The awards ceremony traditionally took place every fall; in 2025 it was moved to June.

Voting is done by peer judging panels. The NATAS solicits anybody with significant experience in national news or documentary reporting or production to serve as judges. Most categories have two voting rounds, with separate judging panels in each round. The top entries in each category are announced as the nominations, and then the top entry is announced as the Emmy winner later at the awards ceremony.

=== Children's and family ===
On November 17, 2021, the NATAS announced that it would begin to present the Children's & Family Emmys Awards beginning in 2022, for excellence in children's and family television. Previously, most award categories for children's and family television programs fell under the scope of the Daytime Emmys, while those programs that aired primarily in primetime fell under the Primetime Emmys. The NATAS stated that this new ceremony was necessary due to an explosive growth of children's and family programming within the last several years. Secondly, the ATAS retired its primetime children's television categories in 2020, agreeing with the NATAS to move all such award categories to the Daytime Emmys, citing that the proliferation of streaming services had created confusion over whether children's programs should fall under the Daytime or Primetime awards.

=== Engineering ===
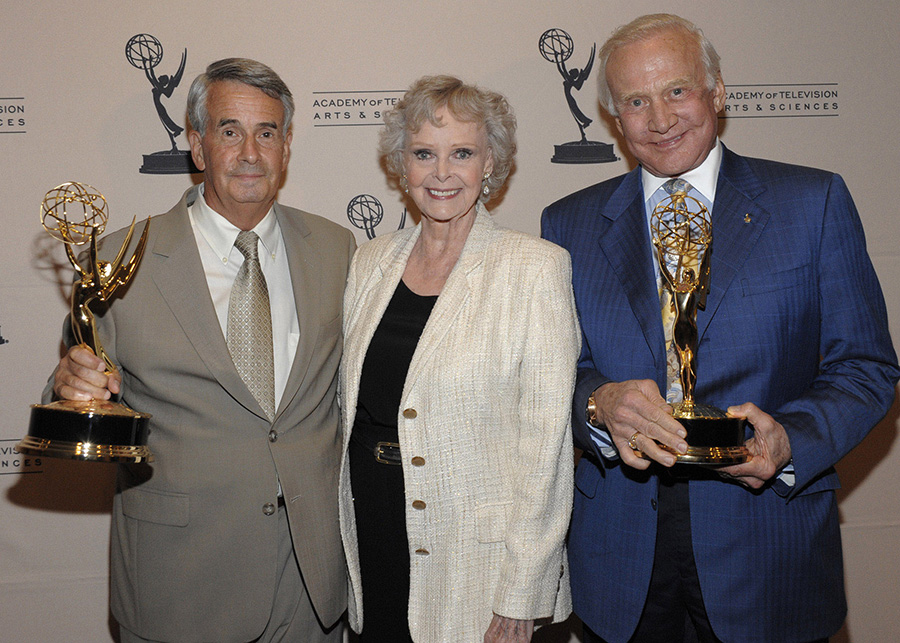
Goddard Space Flight Center Engineer Richard Nafzger, actress June Lockhart, and astronaut Buzz Aldrin accepting the Philo T. Farnsworth Emmy Award on behalf of NASA in 2009, honoring the technological innovations first used during the broadcasts of the Apollo 11 Moon landing

The Primetime Engineering Emmy Awards presented by the ATAS and the Technology & Engineering Emmy Awards presented by the NATAS are two separate competitions that honor individuals, companies, or to scientific or technical organizations in recognition of significant developments and contributions to the engineering and technological aspects of television. Generally, the NATAS's Technology & Engineering Emmys ceremony is held in January, while the ATAS's Primetime Engineering Emmys are presented in October.

Each academy has its own separate panel of highly qualified, experienced engineers in the television industry to determine their respective award recipients. Among the ATAS's Engineering Emmy Award repertoire is the Philo T. Farnsworth Award, given to honor companies who have significantly affected the state of television and broadcast engineering over a long period of time.

=== Regional ===
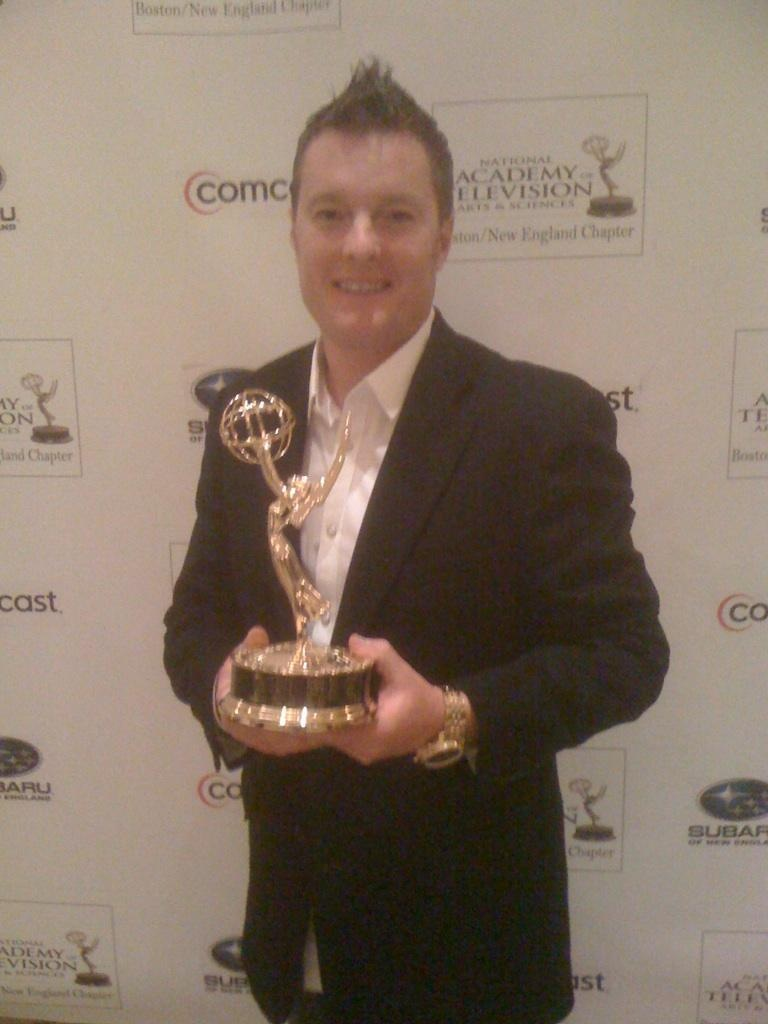
New England sports personality Charlie Moore holding a New England Emmy Award in 2011

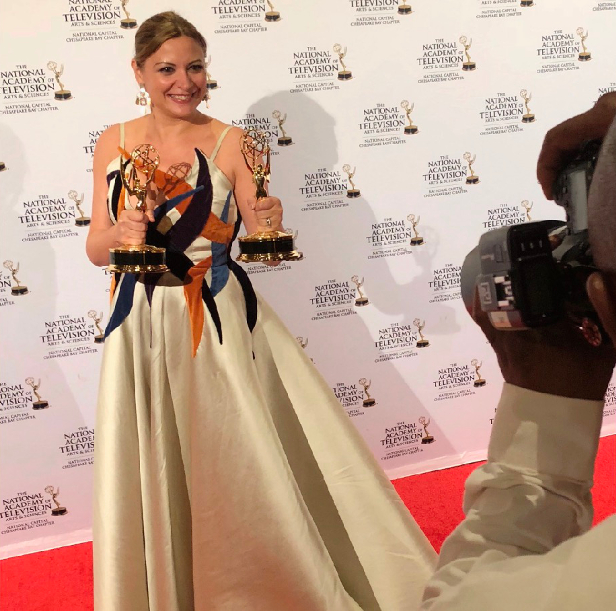
WZDC-CD news director Maria Rozman, winner of three National Capitol/Chesapeake Bay Regional Emmy Awards in 2018

There are 20 regional chapters located across the United States that each conduct regional awards to recognize excellence in all the regional television markets, including state to state programming as well as local news and locally produced shows. Nineteen of the regional chapters are affiliated with the NATAS, while the Los Angeles–based ATAS acts as the regional chapter serving the Los Angeles area.

In general, a show is considered regional if it does not reach more than 50 percent of U.S. households; programs that reach more than 50 percent of the country must enter into one of the national Emmy competitions instead.

Like the national awards, each region goes through their own nomination and voting procedures. Committees are formed to review entries for eligibility and high standards. Once accepted, each entry goes before different review committees, and their votes are cast to determine the final nominees. The final votes are then calculated by certified accounting firms within each region.

Donn Johnson, president of the Pacific Southwest chapter said in 2018: "The Emmy Award is considered the most prestigious award a television professional can receive".

Originally, each Regional Emmy Awards ceremony primarily focused on only honoring individuals in local news programming. The regionals have since been expanded to encompass all locally and state to state-produced shows that receive less than fifty percent of the country's viewing audience.

Regional chapter	States in region
Boston / New England	Maine, Massachusetts, New Hampshire, Rhode Island, and Vermont; Most of Connecticut
Chicago / Midwest	Parts of Illinois, Indiana, and Wisconsin
Highlands Ranch / Heartlands	Colorado, Wyoming, Kansas, and Oklahoma; Parts of Nebraska
Dallas / Lone Star	Texas; Parts of New Mexico
Los Angeles (ATAS)	Greater Los Angeles only
Brecksville / Central Great Lakes (formerly Lower Great Lakes)	Parts of Indiana, Ohio, and Pennsylvania
Southfield / Michigan	Michigan
Arkansas / Mid-America	Arkansas, Iowa, and Missouri; Parts of Illinois and Louisiana
Delaware / Mid-Atlantic	Delaware; Most of Pennsylvania; Parts of New Jersey and Ohio
Nashville / Midsouth	The Huntsville, Alabama television market; All of North Carolina except the Asheville television market; Tennessee
Maryland / National Capitol/Chesapeake Bay	Maryland, Virginia, and Washington, D. C.
New York / New York	New York; Parts of Connecticut and New Jersey
Alaska / Northwest	Alaska, Idaho, Montana, Oregon, and Washington
Kentucky / Ohio Valley	Kentucky and West Virginia; Parts of Indiana and Ohio
San Diego / Pacific Southwest	Most of Southern California (except Greater Los Angeles); Parts of Nevada
Rocky Mountain / Southwest	Arizona and Utah; Most of New Mexico; Imperial County, California
San Francisco / Northern California	Northern California and Hawaii; Parts of Nevada
Atlanta / Southeast	Mississippi and South Carolina; Most of Alabama and Georgia; The Asheville, North Carolina television market
Suncoast	Florida; Parts of Alabama, Louisiana, and Georgia
Minnesota / Upper Midwest	Minnesota, North Dakota, and South Dakota; Parts of Nebraska and Wisconsin

=== International ===
The International Emmy Awards recognizes excellence in TV programming that is produced initially outside the United States. They have been presented annually by the IATAS since 1973. The award ceremony generally takes place in November in New York City.

In general, any non-U.S. organization or individual (such as a network, a local or regional television station, producer, director, or writer) may submit a program, regardless of whether they are a member of the IATAS. For shows that are co-produced between U.S. and foreign production companies, they may be eligible if they initially aired outside of the U.S., or if their broadcast dates were within a few days of each other. A program that enters into the international competition cannot also be entered into any of the domestic ones.

=== Student ===
The College Television Awards are presented by the ATAS in recognition of excellence in college student-produced works. College students nationwide can submit productions and receive recognition in such categories as Comedy, Documentary, Drama, Music, Newscasts, and Series. Entries are first judged by members of the ATAS specializing in each respective field. Winners are then selected by Blue Ribbon Panels. Any work submitted must include a form signed from a faculty advisor to verify that it was produced for a school related group, project, or class.

Similarly, the National Student Production Awards are presented by the NATAS in recognition of excellence in high school student-produced works. High school students nationwide can submit productions and receive recognition in news, craft and programming categories.

=== Governors and trustees ===
The Governors Award is the highest award presented by the ATAS, honoring the achievements of an individual, company or organization whose works stand out with the immediacy of current achievement.

The Trustees Award is the highest award presented by NATAS, honoring the unusual or enduring achievements of an individual.

=== Humanitarian and public service ===
The Bob Hope Humanitarian Award is awarded by the ATAS Board of Governors to an individual in the industry whose humanitarian work has a lasting impact on society.

The Public Service Award is for public service announcements and programming to "advance the common good".

== Criticism ==
Some advocates of gender equality and non-binary people have criticized the separation of male and female acting categories in the Emmys, Academy Awards, and Tony Awards. Though some commentators worry that gender discrimination would cause men to dominate unsegregated categories, other categories are unsegregated. The Grammy Awards went gender-neutral in 2012, while the Daytime Emmy Awards introduced a single Outstanding Younger Performer in a Drama Series category in 2019 to replace their two gender-specific younger actor and actress categories.

== See also ==
=== Emmy related ===
- List of Daytime Emmy Award winners
- List of Primetime Emmy Award winners
- List of International Emmy Award winners

=== Other similar awards ===
- List of American television awards
- British Academy Television Awards (UK)
- National Television Awards (UK)
- Screen Actors Guild Award
- Streamy Awards
- Directors Guild of America Award
- Producers Guild of America Award
- Writers Guild of America Award
- TCA Awards
- Canadian Screen Awards – film and television industry awards in Canada
- Logie Awards – television broadcasting industry awards in Australia
- CableACE Award – defunct award for Cable-based programming
- ITA Awards ( India)
