= List of Primetime Emmy Award winners =

This list showcases the Primetime Emmy Award winners in the comedy program, drama program, variety program, and lead actors categories.

In the early days of the Primetime Emmy Awards, categories awarded by the Academy of Television Arts & Sciences changed year-to-year, causing irregularities in the continuity of the listed awards.

For several years, in the late 1950s and early 1960s, the Academy did not differentiate between comedy and dramas in the individual performance categories, issuing only a catch-all "Best Continuing Performance" or "Outstanding (Actor/Actress) in a Series".

During the mid-1950s, the Academy split Outstanding Drama into several categories, including "One Hour or More", "Half Hour or Less", and "Western or Adventure Series". Each winner is indicated below.

In 1965, Academy President Rod Serling initiated "Area Awards" that narrowed the categories to a select few and allowed for multiple winners in an attempt to foster less competition in favor of more programs and individuals receiving credit for their work. The experiment lasted for only one awards season.

Year	Comedy	Drama	Variety	Lead Comedy Actor	Lead Drama Actor	Lead Comedy Actress	Lead Drama Actress
1949	Pantomime Quiz (Most Popular Television Program) (KTLA); The Necklace (Best Film Made for Television) (Your Show Time series)			Shirley Dinsdale (Most Outstanding Television Personality) (KTLA)			
1950	Texaco Star Theatre (KNBH)		The Ed Wynn Show (KTTV)	Milton Berle (Most Outstanding Kinescoped Personality) (KNBH); Ed Wynn (Most Outstanding Live Personality) (KTTV)			
1951	Pulitzer Prize Playhouse (ABC)		The Alan Young Show (CBS)	Alan Young (CBS)		Gertrude Berg (CBS)	
1952	The Red Skelton Show (CBS)	Studio One (CBS)	Your Show of Shows (NBC)	Red Skelton (NBC)	Sid Caesar (NBC)	Imogene Coca (NBC)	
1953	I Love Lucy (CBS)	Robert Montgomery Presents (NBC)	Your Show of Shows (NBC)	Jimmy Durante (NBC)	Thomas Mitchell	Lucille Ball (CBS)	Helen Hayes
1954	I Love Lucy (CBS)	The U.S. Steel Hour (ABC); Dragnet (NBC)	Omnibus (CBS)	Donald O'Connor; The Colgate Comedy Hour (NBC)		Eve Arden; Our Miss Brooks (CBS)	
1955	Make Room for Daddy (ABC)	The U.S. Steel Hour (ABC); Dragnet (NBC); Stories of the Century (Syndicated)	Walt Disney's Disneyland (ABC)	Danny Thomas; Make Room for Daddy (ABC)		Loretta Young; The Loretta Young Show (NBC)	
1956	The Phil Silvers Show (CBS)	Producers' Showcase (NBC)	Toast of the Town (CBS)	Phil Silvers; The Phil Silvers Show (CBS)		Lucille Ball; I Love Lucy (CBS)	
1957	The Phil Silvers Show (CBS)	Playhouse 90 (CBS)	—N/a	Sid Caesar; Caesar's Hour (NBC)	Robert Young; Father Knows Best (CBS)	Nanette Fabray; Caesar's Hour (NBC)	Loretta Young; The Loretta Young Show (NBC)
1958	The Phil Silvers Show (CBS)	Gunsmoke (CBS); Playhouse 90 (CBS)	The Dinah Shore Chevy Show (NBC)	Robert Young; Father Knows Best (CBS)		Jane Wyatt; Father Knows Best (CBS)	
1959	The Jack Benny Program (CBS)	The Alcoa Hour / Goodyear Television Playhouse (NBC); Playhouse 90 (CBS); Maverick (ABC)	The Dinah Shore Chevy Show (NBC)	Jack Benny; The Jack Benny Program (CBS)	Raymond Burr; Perry Mason (CBS)	Jane Wyatt; Father Knows Best (CBS)	Loretta Young; The Loretta Young Show (NBC)
1960	Art Carney Special (NBC)	Playhouse 90 (CBS)	The Garry Moore Show (CBS)	Robert Stack; The Untouchables (ABC)		Jane Wyatt; Father Knows Best (CBS)	
1961	The Jack Benny Program (CBS)	Macbeth (Hallmark Hall of Fame) (NBC)	Astaire Time (NBC)	Raymond Burr; Perry Mason (CBS)		Barbara Stanwyck; The Barbara Stanwyck Show (NBC)	
1962	The Bob Newhart Show (NBC)	The Defenders (CBS)	The Garry Moore Show (CBS)	E. G. Marshall; The Defenders (CBS)		Shirley Booth; Hazel (NBC)	
1963	The Dick Van Dyke Show (CBS)	The Defenders (CBS)	The Andy Williams Show (NBC)	E. G. Marshall; The Defenders (CBS)		Shirley Booth; Hazel (NBC)	
1964	The Dick Van Dyke Show (CBS)	The Defenders (CBS)	The Danny Kaye Show (CBS)	Dick Van Dyke; The Dick Van Dyke Show (CBS)		Mary Tyler Moore; The Dick Van Dyke Show (CBS)	
1965	four winners (Note: The Dick Van Dyke Show (CBS), Hallmark Hall of Fame: "The Magnificent Yankee" (NBC), My Name Is Barbra (CBS), New York Philharmonic Young People's Concerts: "What Is Sonata Form?" (CBS)) (Program Achievements in Entertainment)			five winners (Note: Leonard Bernstein – New York Philharmonic Young People's Concerts (CBS), Lynn Fontanne – Hallmark Hall of Fame: "The Magnificent Yankee" (NBC), Alfred Lunt – Hallmark Hall of Fame: "The Magnificent Yankee" (NBC), Barbra Streisand – My Name Is Barbra (CBS), Dick Van Dyke – The Dick Van Dyke Show (CBS)) (Individual Achievements in Entertainment – Actors and Performers)			
1966	The Dick Van Dyke Show (CBS)	The Fugitive (ABC)	The Andy Williams Show (NBC)	Dick Van Dyke; The Dick Van Dyke Show (CBS)	Bill Cosby; I Spy (NBC)	Mary Tyler Moore; The Dick Van Dyke Show (CBS)	Barbara Stanwyck; The Big Valley (ABC)
1967	The Monkees (NBC)	Mission: Impossible (CBS)	The Andy Williams Show (NBC)	Don Adams; Get Smart (NBC)	Bill Cosby; I Spy (NBC)	Lucille Ball; The Lucy Show (CBS)	Barbara Bain; Mission: Impossible (CBS)
1968	Get Smart (NBC)	Mission: Impossible (CBS)	Rowan & Martin's Laugh-In (NBC)	Don Adams; Get Smart (NBC)	Bill Cosby; I Spy (NBC)	Lucille Ball; The Lucy Show (CBS)	Barbara Bain; Mission: Impossible (CBS)
1969	Get Smart (NBC)	NET Playhouse (NET)	Rowan & Martin's Laugh-In (NBC)	Don Adams; Get Smart (NBC)	Carl Betz; Judd for the Defense (ABC)	Hope Lange; The Ghost & Mrs. Muir (ABC)	Barbara Bain; Mission: Impossible (CBS)
1970	My World and Welcome to It (NBC)	Marcus Welby, M.D. (ABC)	The David Frost Show (Syndicated)	William Windom; My World and Welcome to It (NBC)	Robert Young; Marcus Welby, M.D. (ABC)	Hope Lange; The Ghost & Mrs. Muir (ABC)	Susan Hampshire; The Forsyte Saga (NET)
1971	All in the Family (CBS)	The Bold Ones: The Senator (NBC)	Singer Presents Burt Bacharach (CBS)	Jack Klugman; The Odd Couple (ABC)	Hal Holbrook; The Bold Ones: The Senator (NBC)	Jean Stapleton; All in the Family (CBS)	Susan Hampshire; The First Churchills (Masterpiece Theatre) (PBS)
1972	All in the Family (CBS)	Elizabeth R (Masterpiece Theatre) (PBS)	The Carol Burnett Show (CBS)	Carroll O'Connor; All in the Family (CBS)	Peter Falk; Columbo (NBC)	Jean Stapleton; All in the Family (CBS)	Glenda Jackson; Elizabeth R (Masterpiece Theatre) (PBS)
1973	All in the Family (CBS)	The Waltons (CBS)	The Julie Andrews Hour (ABC)	Jack Klugman; The Odd Couple (ABC)	Richard Thomas; The Waltons (CBS)	Mary Tyler Moore; The Mary Tyler Moore Show (CBS)	Michael Learned; The Waltons (CBS)
1974	M*A*S*H (CBS)	Upstairs, Downstairs (Masterpiece Theatre) (PBS)	The Carol Burnett Show (CBS)	Alan Alda; M*A*S*H (CBS)	Telly Savalas; Kojak (CBS)	Mary Tyler Moore; The Mary Tyler Moore Show (CBS)	Michael Learned; The Waltons (CBS)
1975	The Mary Tyler Moore Show (CBS)	Upstairs, Downstairs (Masterpiece Theatre) (PBS)	The Carol Burnett Show (CBS)	Tony Randall; The Odd Couple (ABC)	Robert Blake; Baretta (ABC)	Valerie Harper; Rhoda (CBS)	Jean Marsh; Upstairs, Downstairs (Masterpiece Theatre) (PBS)
1976	The Mary Tyler Moore Show (CBS)	Police Story (NBC)	Saturday Night Live (NBC)	Jack Albertson; Chico and the Man (NBC)	Peter Falk; Columbo (NBC)	Mary Tyler Moore; The Mary Tyler Moore Show (CBS)	Michael Learned; The Waltons (CBS)
1977	The Mary Tyler Moore Show (CBS)	Upstairs, Downstairs (Masterpiece Theatre) (PBS)	Van Dyke and Company (NBC)	Carroll O'Connor; All in the Family (CBS)	James Garner; The Rockford Files (NBC)	Bea Arthur; Maude (CBS)	Lindsay Wagner; The Bionic Woman (ABC)
1978	All in the Family (CBS)	The Rockford Files (NBC)	The Muppet Show (Syndicated)	Carroll O'Connor; All in the Family (CBS)	Ed Asner; Lou Grant (CBS)	Jean Stapleton; All in the Family (CBS)	Sada Thompson; Family (ABC)
1979	Taxi (ABC)	Lou Grant (CBS)	Steve & Eydie Celebrate Irving Berlin (NBC)	Carroll O'Connor; All in the Family (CBS)	Ron Leibman; Kaz (CBS)	Ruth Gordon; Taxi (ABC)	Mariette Hartley; The Incredible Hulk (CBS)
1980	Taxi (ABC)	Lou Grant (CBS)	Baryshnikov on Broadway (ABC)	Richard Mulligan; Soap (ABC)	Ed Asner; Lou Grant (CBS)	Cathryn Damon; Soap (ABC)	Barbara Bel Geddes; Dallas (CBS)
1981	Taxi (ABC)	Hill Street Blues (NBC)	Lily: Sold Out (CBS)	Judd Hirsch; Taxi (ABC)	Daniel J. Travanti; Hill Street Blues (NBC)	Isabel Sanford; The Jeffersons (CBS)	Barbara Babcock; Hill Street Blues (NBC)
1982	Barney Miller (ABC)	Hill Street Blues (NBC)	Night of 100 Stars (ABC)	Alan Alda; M*A*S*H (CBS)	Daniel J. Travanti; Hill Street Blues (NBC)	Carol Kane; Taxi (ABC)	Michael Learned; Nurse (CBS)
1983	Cheers (NBC)	Hill Street Blues (NBC)	Motown 25: Yesterday, Today, Forever (NBC)	Judd Hirsch; Taxi (NBC)	Ed Flanders; St. Elsewhere (NBC)	Shelley Long; Cheers (NBC)	Tyne Daly; Cagney & Lacey (CBS)
1984	Cheers (NBC)	Hill Street Blues (NBC)	Kennedy Center Honors (CBS)	John Ritter; Three's Company (ABC)	Tom Selleck; Magnum, P.I. (CBS)	Jane Curtin; Kate & Allie (CBS)	Tyne Daly; Cagney & Lacey (CBS)
1985	The Cosby Show (NBC)	Cagney & Lacey (CBS)	Motown Returns to the Apollo (NBC)	Robert Guillaume; Benson (ABC)	William Daniels; St. Elsewhere (NBC)	Jane Curtin; Kate & Allie (CBS)	Tyne Daly; Cagney & Lacey (CBS)
1986	The Golden Girls (NBC)	Cagney & Lacey (CBS)	Kennedy Center Honors (CBS)	Michael J. Fox; Family Ties (NBC)	William Daniels; St. Elsewhere (NBC)	Betty White; The Golden Girls (NBC)	Sharon Gless; Cagney & Lacey (CBS)
1987	The Golden Girls (NBC)	L.A. Law (NBC)	41st Tony Awards (CBS)	Michael J. Fox; Family Ties (NBC)	Bruce Willis; Moonlighting (ABC)	Rue McClanahan; The Golden Girls (NBC)	Sharon Gless; Cagney & Lacey (CBS)
1988	The Wonder Years (ABC)	thirtysomething (ABC)	Irving Berlin's 100th Birthday Celebration (CBS)	Michael J. Fox; Family Ties (NBC)	Richard Kiley; A Year in the Life (NBC)	Bea Arthur; The Golden Girls (NBC)	Tyne Daly; Cagney & Lacey (CBS)
1989	Cheers (NBC)	L.A. Law (NBC)	The Tracey Ullman Show (Fox)	Richard Mulligan; Empty Nest (NBC)	Carroll O'Connor; In the Heat of the Night (NBC)	Candice Bergen; Murphy Brown (CBS)	Dana Delany; China Beach (ABC)
1990	Murphy Brown (CBS)	L.A. Law (NBC)	In Living Color (Fox)	Ted Danson; Cheers (NBC)	Peter Falk; Columbo (ABC)	Candice Bergen; Murphy Brown (CBS)	Patricia Wettig thirtysomething (ABC)
1991	Cheers (NBC)	L.A. Law (NBC)	63rd Academy Awards (ABC)	Burt Reynolds; Evening Shade (CBS)	James Earl Jones; Gabriel's Fire (ABC)	Kirstie Alley; Cheers (NBC)	Patricia Wettig thirtysomething (ABC)
1992	Murphy Brown (CBS)	Northern Exposure (CBS)	The Tonight Show Starring Johnny Carson (NBC)	Craig T. Nelson; Coach (ABC)	Christopher Lloyd; Avonlea (Disney)	Candice Bergen; Murphy Brown (CBS)	Dana Delany; China Beach (ABC)
1993	Seinfeld (NBC)	Picket Fences (CBS)	Saturday Night Live (NBC)	Ted Danson; Cheers (NBC)	Tom Skerritt; Picket Fences (CBS)	Roseanne Barr; Roseanne (ABC)	Kathy Baker; Picket Fences (CBS)
1994	Frasier (NBC)	Picket Fences (CBS)	Late Show with David Letterman (CBS)	Kelsey Grammer; Frasier (NBC)	Dennis Franz; NYPD Blue (ABC)	Candice Bergen; Murphy Brown (CBS)	Sela Ward; Sisters (NBC)
1995	Frasier (NBC)	NYPD Blue (ABC)	The Tonight Show with Jay Leno (NBC)	Kelsey Grammer; Frasier (NBC)	Mandy Patinkin; Chicago Hope (CBS)	Candice Bergen; Murphy Brown (CBS)	Kathy Baker; Picket Fences (CBS)
1996	Frasier (NBC)	ER (NBC)	Dennis Miller Live (HBO)	John Lithgow; 3rd Rock from the Sun (NBC)	Dennis Franz; NYPD Blue (ABC)	Helen Hunt; Mad About You (NBC)	Kathy Baker; Picket Fences (CBS)
1997	Frasier (NBC)	Law & Order (NBC)	Tracey Takes On... (HBO)	John Lithgow; 3rd Rock from the Sun (NBC)	Dennis Franz; NYPD Blue (ABC)	Helen Hunt; Mad About You (NBC)	Gillian Anderson; The X-Files (Fox)
1998	Frasier (NBC)	The Practice (ABC)	Late Show with David Letterman (CBS)	Kelsey Grammer; Frasier (NBC)	Andre Braugher; Homicide: Life on the Street (NBC)	Helen Hunt; Mad About You (NBC)	Christine Lahti; Chicago Hope (CBS)
1999	Ally McBeal (Fox)	The Practice (ABC)	Late Show with David Letterman (CBS)	John Lithgow; 3rd Rock from the Sun (NBC)	Dennis Franz; NYPD Blue (ABC)	Helen Hunt; Mad About You (NBC)	Edie Falco; The Sopranos (HBO)
2000	Will & Grace (NBC)	The West Wing (NBC)	Late Show with David Letterman (CBS)	Michael J. Fox; Spin City (ABC)	James Gandolfini; The Sopranos (HBO)	Patricia Heaton; Everybody Loves Raymond (CBS)	Sela Ward; Once and Again (ABC)
2001	Sex and the City (HBO)	The West Wing (NBC)	Late Show with David Letterman (CBS)	Eric McCormack; Will & Grace (NBC)	James Gandolfini; The Sopranos (HBO)	Patricia Heaton; Everybody Loves Raymond (CBS)	Edie Falco; The Sopranos (HBO)
2002	Friends (NBC)	The West Wing (NBC)	Late Show with David Letterman (CBS)	Ray Romano; Everybody Loves Raymond (CBS)	Michael Chiklis; The Shield (FX)	Jennifer Aniston; Friends (NBC)	Allison Janney; The West Wing (NBC)
2003	Everybody Loves Raymond (CBS)	The West Wing (NBC)	The Daily Show with Jon Stewart (Comedy Central)	Tony Shalhoub; Monk (USA)	James Gandolfini; The Sopranos (HBO)	Debra Messing; Will & Grace (NBC)	Edie Falco; The Sopranos (HBO)
2004	Arrested Development (Fox)	The Sopranos (HBO)	The Daily Show with Jon Stewart (Comedy Central)	Kelsey Grammer; Frasier (NBC)	James Spader; The Practice (ABC)	Sarah Jessica Parker; Sex and the City (HBO)	Allison Janney; The West Wing (NBC)
2005	Everybody Loves Raymond (CBS)	Lost (ABC)	The Daily Show with Jon Stewart (Comedy Central)	Tony Shalhoub; Monk (USA)	James Spader; Boston Legal (ABC)	Felicity Huffman; Desperate Housewives (ABC)	Patricia Arquette; Medium (NBC)
2006	The Office (NBC)	24 (Fox)	The Daily Show with Jon Stewart (Comedy Central)	Tony Shalhoub; Monk (USA)	Kiefer Sutherland; 24 (Fox)	Julia Louis-Dreyfus; The New Adventures of Old Christine (CBS)	Mariska Hargitay; Law & Order: Special Victims Unit (NBC)
2007	30 Rock (NBC)	The Sopranos (HBO)	The Daily Show with Jon Stewart (Comedy Central)	Ricky Gervais; Extras (BBC / HBO)	James Spader; Boston Legal (ABC)	America Ferrera; Ugly Betty (ABC)	Sally Field; Brothers & Sisters (ABC)
2008	30 Rock (NBC)	Mad Men (AMC)	The Daily Show with Jon Stewart (Comedy Central)	Alec Baldwin; 30 Rock (NBC)	Bryan Cranston; Breaking Bad (AMC)	Tina Fey; 30 Rock (NBC)	Glenn Close; Damages (FX)
2009	30 Rock (NBC)	Mad Men (AMC)	The Daily Show with Jon Stewart (Comedy Central)	Alec Baldwin; 30 Rock (NBC)	Bryan Cranston; Breaking Bad (AMC)	Toni Collette; United States of Tara (Showtime)	Glenn Close; Damages (FX)
2010	Modern Family (ABC)	Mad Men (AMC)	The Daily Show with Jon Stewart (Comedy Central)	Jim Parsons; The Big Bang Theory (CBS)	Bryan Cranston; Breaking Bad (AMC)	Edie Falco; Nurse Jackie (Showtime)	Kyra Sedgwick; The Closer (TNT)
2011	Modern Family (ABC)	Mad Men (AMC)	The Daily Show with Jon Stewart (Comedy Central)	Jim Parsons; The Big Bang Theory (CBS)	Kyle Chandler; Friday Night Lights (DirecTV/NBC)	Melissa McCarthy; Mike & Molly (CBS)	Julianna Margulies; The Good Wife (CBS)
2012	Modern Family (ABC)	Homeland (Showtime)	The Daily Show with Jon Stewart (Comedy Central)	Jon Cryer; Two and a Half Men (CBS)	Damian Lewis; Homeland (Showtime)	Julia Louis-Dreyfus; Veep (HBO)	Claire Danes; Homeland (Showtime)
2013	Modern Family (ABC)	Breaking Bad (AMC)	The Colbert Report (Comedy Central)	Jim Parsons; The Big Bang Theory (CBS)	Jeff Daniels; The Newsroom (HBO)	Julia Louis-Dreyfus; Veep (HBO)	Claire Danes; Homeland (Showtime)
2014	Modern Family (ABC)	Breaking Bad (AMC)	The Colbert Report (Comedy Central)	Jim Parsons; The Big Bang Theory (CBS)	Bryan Cranston; Breaking Bad (AMC)	Julia Louis-Dreyfus; Veep (HBO)	Julianna Margulies; The Good Wife (CBS)
2015	Veep (HBO)	Game of Thrones (HBO)	The Daily Show with Jon Stewart (Comedy Central) (Variety Talk Series); Inside Amy Schumer (Comedy Central) (Variety Sketch Series)	Jeffrey Tambor; Transparent (Amazon)	Jon Hamm; Mad Men (AMC)	Julia Louis-Dreyfus; Veep (HBO)	Viola Davis; How to Get Away with Murder (ABC)
2016	Veep (HBO)	Game of Thrones (HBO)	Last Week Tonight with John Oliver (HBO) (Variety Talk Series); Key & Peele (Comedy Central) (Variety Sketch Series)	Jeffrey Tambor; Transparent (Amazon)	Rami Malek; Mr. Robot (USA)	Julia Louis-Dreyfus; Veep (HBO)	Tatiana Maslany; Orphan Black (BBC America)
2017	Veep (HBO)	The Handmaid's Tale (Hulu)	Last Week Tonight with John Oliver (HBO) (Variety Talk Series); Saturday Night Live (NBC) (Variety Sketch Series)	Donald Glover; Atlanta (FX)	Sterling K. Brown; This Is Us (NBC)	Julia Louis-Dreyfus; Veep (HBO)	Elisabeth Moss; The Handmaid's Tale (Hulu)
2018	The Marvelous Mrs. Maisel (Amazon)	Game of Thrones (HBO)	Last Week Tonight with John Oliver (HBO) (Variety Talk Series); Saturday Night Live (NBC) (Variety Sketch Series)	Bill Hader; Barry (HBO)	Matthew Rhys; The Americans (FX)	Rachel Brosnahan; The Marvelous Mrs. Maisel (Amazon)	Claire Foy; The Crown (Netflix)
2019	Fleabag (Amazon)	Game of Thrones (HBO)	Last Week Tonight with John Oliver (HBO) (Variety Talk Series); Saturday Night Live (NBC) (Variety Sketch Series)	Bill Hader; Barry (HBO)	Billy Porter; Pose (FX)	Phoebe Waller-Bridge; Fleabag (Amazon)	Jodie Comer; Killing Eve (BBC America)
2020	Schitt's Creek (Pop)	Succession (HBO)	Last Week Tonight with John Oliver (HBO) (Variety Talk Series); Saturday Night Live (NBC) (Variety Sketch Series)	Eugene Levy; Schitt's Creek (Pop)	Jeremy Strong; Succession (HBO)	Catherine O'Hara; Schitt's Creek (Pop)	Zendaya; Euphoria (HBO)
2021	Ted Lasso (Apple TV+)	The Crown (Netflix)	Last Week Tonight with John Oliver (HBO) (Variety Talk Series); Saturday Night Live (NBC) (Variety Sketch Series)	Jason Sudeikis; Ted Lasso (Apple TV+)	Josh O'Connor; The Crown (Netflix)	Jean Smart; Hacks (HBO)	Olivia Colman; The Crown (Netflix)
2022	Ted Lasso (Apple TV+)	Succession (HBO)	Last Week Tonight with John Oliver (HBO) (Variety Talk Series); Saturday Night Live (NBC) (Variety Sketch Series)	Jason Sudeikis; Ted Lasso (Apple TV+)	Lee Jung-jae; Squid Game (Netflix)	Jean Smart; Hacks (HBO)	Zendaya; Euphoria (HBO)
2023	The Bear (FX)	Succession (HBO)	The Daily Show (Comedy Central) (Talk Series); Last Week Tonight with John Oliver (HBO) (Scripted Variety Series)	Jeremy Allen White; The Bear (FX)	Kieran Culkin; Succession (HBO)	Quinta Brunson; Abbott Elementary (ABC)	Sarah Snook; Succession (HBO)
2024	Hacks (HBO Max)	Shōgun (FX)	The Daily Show (Comedy Central) (Talk Series); Last Week Tonight with John Oliver (HBO) (Scripted Variety Series)	Jeremy Allen White; The Bear (FX)	Hiroyuki Sanada; Shōgun (FX)	Jean Smart; Hacks (HBO Max)	Anna Sawai; Shōgun (FX)
2025	The Studio (Apple TV+)	The Pitt (HBO Max)	The Late Show with Stephen Colbert (CBS) (Talk Series); Last Week Tonight with John Oliver (HBO) (Scripted Variety Series)	Seth Rogen; The Studio (Apple TV+)	Noah Wyle; The Pitt (HBO Max)	Jean Smart; Hacks (HBO Max)	Britt Lower; Severance (Apple TV+)
2026	Widow's Bay (Apple TV+)	The Pitt (HBO Max)	The Late Show with Stephen Colbert (CBS)	Matthew Rhys; Widow's Bay (Apple TV+)	Noah Wyle; The Pitt (HBO Max)	Jean Smart; Hacks (HBO Max)	Rhea Seehorn; Pluribus (Apple TV+)

== See also ==
- List of Primetime Emmy Awards received by HBO
- List of Primetime Emmy Awards received by Netflix
- List of Daytime Emmy Award winners in acting and drama
- List of International Emmy Award winners
