= FSN =

FSN may refer to:

- Fate/stay night, a visual novel
- Federal State of Novorossiya, a separatist entity in eastern Ukraine
- Federal Stock Number, a defunct codification system used by the United States federal government
- Federation of Student Nationalists, the student wing of the Scottish National Party
- Fjölbrautaskóli Snæfellinga, an Icelandic high school (menntaskóli) located in Grundarfjörður
- FN Five-seven, a Belgian pistol
- Fox Sports Networks, an American television network
- Fox Sports News (Australia), an Australian television channel
- Fox Sports North, the former name of an American regional sports network by Fox Sports Networks
- Full Service Network, an American telecommunications company
- Fu's subcutaneous needle
- National Social Front (Italian: Fronte Sociale Nazionale), an Italian political party
- National Salvation Front (Romania) (Romanian: Frontul Salvării Naționale), a defunct Romanian political party
- File System Navigator, file manager software from Silicon Graphics
