= Primetime Emmy Awards =

American television awards

- Previous: 78th Primetime Emmy Awards; September 14, 2026; Next: 79th Primetime Emmy Awards; TBD 2027
- Awarded for: Excellence in primetime television
- Country: United States
- Presented by: Academy of Television Arts & Sciences
- First award: January 25, 1949; 77 years ago
- Website: emmys.com

Television/radio coverage
- Network: NBC (1955–1965); CBS / ABC / NBC (1966–1986, rotating); Fox (1987–1992); ABC (1993–1994); Fox / ABC / CBS / NBC (1995–2026, rotating); Amazon Prime Video (upcoming in 2027)

The Primetime Emmy Awards, or Primetime Emmys, are part of the extensive range of Emmy Awards for artistic and technical merit for the American television industry. Presented by the Academy of Television Arts & Sciences (ATAS), the Primetime Emmys are awarded in recognition of excellence in American primetime television programming. They are divided into three classes: the regular Primetime Emmy Awards, the Primetime Creative Arts Emmy Awards to honor technical and other similar behind-the-scenes achievements, and the Primetime Engineering Emmy Awards for recognizing significant contributions to the engineering and technological aspects of television. First presented in 1949, the award was originally known as simply the "Emmy Awards" until the International and Daytime Emmy Awards were created in the early 1970s to expand the Emmys to other sectors of the television industry. The Primetime Emmy Awards generally air in September, on the Sunday before the official start of the fall television season.

== History ==
The Academy of Television Arts & Sciences (ATAS) was founded by Syd Cassyd in 1946. The first Emmy ceremony was held on January 25, 1949, at the Hollywood Athletic Club. Tickets cost $5 and only six awards were presented.

The Emmys originally honored shows produced and aired locally in the Los Angeles area, but expanded into a national event in 1952, to honor shows aired nationwide on broadcast television. Originally, there was only one Emmy event held per year to honor shows nationally broadcast in the United States. In 1968, an "Outstanding Achievement in Daytime Programming" category was added, but due to the voting rules of the time, judges could opt to either award one or no Emmy, and in the end they decided that no one should be nominated. This omission outraged soap opera writer Agnes Nixon, causing her to write in The New York Times, "...after viewing the recent fiasco of the Emmy awards, it may well be considered a mark of distinction to have been ignored by this group." This eventually led to the creation of the separate Daytime Emmy Awards to honor daytime programming, run by the sister organization, the National Academy of Television Arts and Sciences (NATAS).

Cable programs first became eligible for the Primetime Emmys in 1988. Original online-only streaming television programs then became eligible in 2013.

Between 1949 and 2001, voting members were required to watch submissions at the ATAS or local hotels. From 2002 to 2014, members could watch submissions at home on DVDs. Starting in 2015, members could watch submissions through secure online platforms, with DVDs being eliminated in 2020.

In December 2021, the ATAS and NATAS announced major realignments to the Emmy Awards, accounting for the growth of streaming services by aligning their categories and the ceremonies' scopes around factors such as the themes and frequency of such programming, rather than dayparts:

- All categories for scripted comedies and dramas, excluding daytime serial dramas (defined as an episodic, multi-camera drama serial that airs on a weekday basis, or a revival or spin-off of such a series), and programming targeting viewers 15 and younger (which now fall under the Children's and Family Emmy Awards) fall under the ATAS and Primetime Emmy Awards, regardless of scheduling.
- Talk shows was divided between the Daytime and Primetime Emmy Awards based on "format and style characteristics reflective of current programming in the daytime or late night space".
- Awards for morning programs was moved to the News and Documentary Emmy Awards.
- Categories for game shows and instructional/DIY programming remained split between the Daytime and Primetime Emmy Awards for 2022. Most game show categories were then moved to the Primetime Emmys in 2023, while game shows featuring children as contestants were moved to the Children's and Family Emmys.

== Rules ==
Among the Primetime Emmy Award rules, a show must originally air on American television during the eligibility period between June 1 and May 31 of any given year. In the previous Emmy rules, in order to be considered a national primetime show, the program must air between 6:00 p.m. and 2:00 a.m., and to at least 50 percent of the country; since 2022, programming can enter the Primetime Emmys based on its genre, not airtime. A show that enters into the Primetime Emmy Awards are ineligible to also enter into the Daytime Emmy Awards or any other national Emmy competition. For shows in syndication, whose air times vary between media markets, they can either be entered in the Daytime or Primetime Emmy Awards (provided they still reach the 50 percent national reach), but not in both. Until 2022, for game shows that reach the 50 percent threshold, they could be entered into the Daytime Emmy Awards if they normally air before 8 p.m (including the former "access hour" from 7:00 p.m. to 8:00 p.m.); since 2023, most game shows are eligible for the Primetime Emmy Awards, regardless of airtime. For streaming television programs, they must be available for downloading or streaming to more than 50 percent of the country, and shows in syndication can only enter in one of the national Emmy competitions.

Shows that are offered for pre-sale to consumers, whether on home video devices or via the internet, are ineligible if the pre-sale period starts more than seven days before the show's initial airing. Also, a show that receives a "general theatrical release" before its first airing (either via television or the internet) is ineligible. The definition of this phrase excludes limited releases for the specific purpose of award qualification, such as screenings at film festivals or the one-week releases in Los Angeles (and, for documentaries, New York City) required for Oscar eligibility.

Entries must be submitted by the end of April, even if a show is not scheduled to originally air until the following month when the eligibility period ends in May. Most award categories also require entries to include DVDs or tape masters of the show. For most series categories, any six episodes that originally aired during the eligibility period must be submitted (programs that were canceled before airing their sixth episode are ineligible). For most individual achievement categories, only one episode is required to be submitted; if an episode is a two-parter, both parts may be included on the submitted DVD.

Ballots to select the nominations are sent to Academy members in June. For most categories, members from each of the branches vote to determine the nominees only in their respective categories (for example, writers vote for writing awards, actors vote for acting awards). As of July 1, 2021, the various television industry professions were sorted into 29 Peer Groups. All 16,000 members can vote for nominations in the outstanding program categories (including Drama Series, Comedy Series, Limited Series, Television Movies, Variety Series, Reality Competition, and Short Form Series). The final voting poll to determine the winners is held in August, and is done by judging panels. In June, the Academy solicits volunteers among its active members to serve on these panels. All active members may serve on the program panels; otherwise they are restricted to those categories within their own branch.

== Statuette ==
The Primetime Emmy statuette is made of copper, nickel, silver and gold and takes five and a half hours to make. Each Emmy weighs six pounds, twelve ounces.

The number of statuettes given to winners varies by category. All members of a team are not guaranteed their own trophy. However, winners in large teams (such as writers) can purchase their own trophy for an estimated $400.

== Telecast ==
With TV broadcasting still in its infancy, the first six ceremonies only aired in the Los Angeles area. KTSL (now KCBS) televised the first ceremony in 1949. KFI (now KCAL) then aired the second ceremony in 1950, followed by KLAC (now KCOP) in 1951, KECA (now KABC) in 1952, KLAC again in 1953, and KHJ (formerly KFI, now KCAL) in 1954.

NBC became the first broadcast network to nationally televise the Emmys, airing the ceremonies from 1955 to 1965. The Emmys then rotated among CBS, ABC, and NBC (in that order) between 1967 and 1986. The 1977 ceremony began a three-decade practice of having the telecast on a tape-delay in the West Coast.

The "Big Three" broadcast networks lost their rights to the fledgling Fox Network in 1987, which televised the ceremonies until 1992. The Emmys then returned to ABC in 1993 and 1994.

The telecast then rotated among Fox, ABC, CBS, and NBC (in that order) between 1995 and 2026. In 2006 and 2010, NBC aired the ceremony in the last Sunday in August, to avoid conflicts with NBC's commitment to broadcasting Sunday-night NFL games. 2010 also marked the first time in more than three decades that the ceremonies aired live from coast-to-coast, ending the practice of having a West Coast-tape-delay. The 2014 ceremony was moved to a Monday but remained in August, due to another conflict with the MTV Video Music Awards being presented on a Sunday. In 2018, 2022, and 2026, the ceremony returned to September and airing on the Monday on NBC due to conflicts with Sunday Night Football.

In October 2026, Amazon Prime Video signed a six-year deal to stream the Emmys and moving it off of broadcast TV for the first time, starting with the 2027 ceremony.

== Categories ==
=== Primetime Emmy Awards ===
The Primetime Emmy Award is awarded in the following categories:

==== Programs ====
- Outstanding Comedy Series
- Outstanding Drama Series
- Outstanding Limited or Anthology Series
- Outstanding Reality Competition Program
- Outstanding Variety Series

==== Directing ====
- Outstanding Directing for a Comedy Series
- Outstanding Directing for a Drama Series
- Outstanding Directing for a Limited or Anthology Series or Movie

==== Writing ====
- Outstanding Writing for a Comedy Series
- Outstanding Writing for a Drama Series
- Outstanding Writing for a Limited or Anthology Series or Movie

==== Acting ====
===== Lead actor =====
- Outstanding Lead Actor in a Comedy Series
- Outstanding Lead Actor in a Drama Series
- Outstanding Lead Actor in a Limited or Anthology Series or Movie

===== Lead actress =====
- Outstanding Lead Actress in a Comedy Series
- Outstanding Lead Actress in a Drama Series
- Outstanding Lead Actress in a Limited or Anthology Series or Movie

===== Supporting actor =====
- Outstanding Supporting Actor in a Comedy Series
- Outstanding Supporting Actor in a Drama Series
- Outstanding Supporting Actor in a Limited or Anthology Series or Movie

===== Supporting actress =====
- Outstanding Supporting Actress in a Comedy Series
- Outstanding Supporting Actress in a Drama Series
- Outstanding Supporting Actress in a Limited or Anthology Series or Movie

=== Primetime Creative Arts Emmy Awards ===
The Primetime Creative Arts Emmy Awards are awarded in the following categories (some of which separately recognize work based on whether a single-camera or multi-camera setup was used):

==== Programs ====
- Outstanding Documentary or Nonfiction Series
- Outstanding Documentary or Nonfiction Special
- Outstanding Emerging Media Program
- Exceptional Merit in Documentary Filmmaking
- Outstanding Game Show
- Outstanding Hosted Nonfiction Series or Special
- Outstanding Movie
- Outstanding Short Form Comedy, Drama or Variety Series
- Outstanding Short Form Nonfiction or Reality Series
- Outstanding Structured Reality Program
- Outstanding Unstructured Reality Program
- Outstanding Variety Special (Live)
- Outstanding Variety Special (Pre-Recorded)

==== Acting ====
- Outstanding Character Voice-Over Performance
- Outstanding Guest Actor in a Drama Series
- Outstanding Guest Actor in a Comedy Series
- Outstanding Guest Actress in a Drama Series
- Outstanding Guest Actress in a Comedy Series
- Outstanding Narrator
- Outstanding Performer in a Short Form Comedy or Drama Series

==== Animation ====
- Outstanding Animated Program
- Outstanding Individual Achievement in Animation

==== Casting ====
- Outstanding Casting for a Comedy Series
- Outstanding Casting for a Drama Series
- Outstanding Casting for a Limited or Anthology Series or Movie
- Outstanding Casting for a Reality Program

==== Choreography ====
- Outstanding Choreography for Scripted Programming
- Outstanding Choreography for Variety and Reality Programming

==== Cinematography ====
- Outstanding Cinematography for a Limited or Anthology Series or Movie
- Outstanding Cinematography for a Nonfiction Program
- Outstanding Cinematography for a Reality Program
- Outstanding Cinematography for a Series (Half-Hour)
- Outstanding Cinematography for a Series (One Hour)

==== Commercial ====
- Outstanding Commercial

==== Costumes ====
- Outstanding Contemporary Costumes
- Outstanding Fantasy/Sci-Fi Costumes
- Outstanding Period Costumes
- Outstanding Costumes for a Variety, Nonfiction, or Reality Programming

==== Directing ====
- Outstanding Directing for a Documentary/Nonfiction Program
- Outstanding Directing for a Reality Program
- Outstanding Directing for a Variety Series
- Outstanding Directing for a Variety Special

==== Hairstyling ====
- Outstanding Contemporary Hairstyling
- Outstanding Hairstyling for a Variety, Nonfiction or Reality Program
- Outstanding Period or Fantasy/Sci-Fi Hairstyling

==== Hosting ====
- Outstanding Host for a Game Show
- Outstanding Host for a Reality or Reality Competition Program

==== Lighting design / direction ====
- Outstanding Lighting Design / Lighting Direction for a Variety Series
- Outstanding Lighting Design / Lighting Direction for a Variety Special

==== Makeup ====
- Outstanding Contemporary Makeup (Non-Prosthetic)
- Outstanding Makeup for a Variety, Nonfiction or Reality Program
- Outstanding Period or Fantasy/Sci-Fi Makeup (Non-Prosthetic)
- Outstanding Prosthetic Makeup

==== Motion design ====
- Outstanding Motion Design

==== Music ====
- Outstanding Music Composition for a Documentary/Nonfiction or Reality Program (Original Dramatic Score)
- Outstanding Music Composition for a Limited or Anthology Series, Movie or Special (Original Dramatic Score)
- Outstanding Music Composition for a Series (Original Dramatic Score)
- Outstanding Music Direction
- Outstanding Music Supervision
- Outstanding Original Main Title Theme Music
- Outstanding Original Music and Lyrics

==== Picture editing ====
- Outstanding Picture Editing for a Multi-Camera Comedy Series
- Outstanding Picture Editing for a Single-Camera Comedy Series
- Outstanding Picture Editing for a Drama Series
- Outstanding Picture Editing for a Limited or Anthology Series or Movie
- Outstanding Picture Editing for a Nonfiction Program
- Outstanding Picture Editing for a Structured Reality or Competition Program
- Outstanding Picture Editing for an Unstructured Reality Program
- Outstanding Picture Editing for Variety Programming

==== Production design ====
- Outstanding Production Design for a Narrative Contemporary Program (One Hour or More)
- Outstanding Production Design for a Narrative Program (Half-Hour)
- Outstanding Production Design for a Narrative Period or Fantasy Program (One Hour or More)
- Outstanding Production Design for a Variety or Reality Series
- Outstanding Production Design for a Variety Special

==== Sound editing ====
- Outstanding Sound Editing for a Comedy or Drama Series (One-Hour)
- Outstanding Sound Editing for a Comedy or Drama Series (Half-Hour) and Animation
- Outstanding Sound Editing for a Limited or Anthology Series, Movie or Special
- Outstanding Sound Editing for a Nonfiction or Reality Program

==== Sound mixing ====
- Outstanding Sound Mixing for a Comedy or Drama Series (One-Hour)
- Outstanding Sound Mixing for a Comedy or Drama Series (Half-Hour) and Animation
- Outstanding Sound Mixing for a Limited or Anthology Series or Movie
- Outstanding Sound Mixing for a Nonfiction Program
- Outstanding Sound Mixing for a Reality Program
- Outstanding Sound Mixing for a Variety Series or Special

==== Special and visual effects ====
- Outstanding Special Visual Effects in a Season or a Movie
- Outstanding Special Visual Effects in a Single Episode

==== Stunts ====
- Outstanding Stunt Coordination for Comedy Programming
- Outstanding Stunt Coordination for Drama Programming
- Outstanding Stunt Performance

==== Technical direction ====
- Outstanding Technical Direction and Camerawork for a Series
- Outstanding Technical Direction and Camerawork for a Special

==== Title design ====
- Outstanding Title Design

==== Writing ====
- Outstanding Writing for a Nonfiction Program
- Outstanding Writing for a Variety Series
- Outstanding Writing for a Variety Special

=== Primetime Emmy Engineering Awards ===
The Primetime Engineering Emmy Awards are given specifically for outstanding achievement in engineering. They are presented to an individual, company, or organization for engineering developments so significant an improvement on existing methods or so innovative in nature that they materially affect the transmission, recording, or reception of television. The award, which is television's highest engineering honor, is determined by a jury of highly qualified, experienced engineers in the television industry.

- Engineering plaque
- Engineering certificate
- Outstanding Achievement in Engineering Development (Primetime Emmy statuette)
- Charles F. Jenkins Lifetime Achievement Award
- Outstanding Achievement in Engineering Development
- Philo T. Farnsworth Corporate Achievement Engineering Award

=== Retired categories ===
A number of awards have been retired throughout the years, including some that have been replaced by similar award categories in the Daytime Emmy Awards, Sports Emmy Awards, and other areas of recognition:

- Best Live Show
- Best New Program
- Super Emmy Award
- Outstanding Children's Program (Note: Replaced by a similar category in the Children's and Family Emmy Awards)
- Best Specialty Act – Single or Group
- Outstanding Voice-Over Performance
- Outstanding Actor in a Short Form Comedy or Drama Series
- Outstanding Actress in a Short Form Comedy or Drama Series
- Outstanding Art Direction for a Miniseries or Movie
- Outstanding Art Direction for a Single-Camera Series
- Outstanding Cinematography for a Multi-Camera Series (Half-Hour)
- Outstanding Costumes for a Miniseries, Movie, or Special
- Outstanding Costumes for a Series
- Outstanding Creative Achievement in Interactive Media within a Scripted Program
- Outstanding Creative Achievement in Interactive Media within an Unscripted Program
- Outstanding Hairstyling for a Limited Series or Movie
- Outstanding Hairstyling for a Single-Camera Series
- Outstanding Makeup for a Single-Camera Series (Non-Prosthetic)
- Outstanding Short Form Animated Program
- Outstanding Short Form Comedy or Drama Series
- Outstanding Short Form Variety Series
- Outstanding Scripted Variety Series
- Outstanding Talk Series
- Outstanding Individual Performance in a Variety or Music Program
- Program of the Year
- Best Kinescope Show
- Best Sports Coverage (Note: Replaced by a similar category in the Sports Emmy Awards)
- Best Western Series
- Outstanding Sports Personality
- Outstanding Live Sports Special
- Most Outstanding Live Personality
- Most Outstanding Kinescoped Personality
- Outstanding Classical Music-Dance Program
- Outstanding Program Achievement in Daytime Drama (Note: Replaced by a similar category in the Daytime Emmy Awards)
- Outstanding Program Achievement by Individuals in Daytime Drama

== See also ==
- TCA Awards
- National Television Awards
- Critics' Choice Television Awards
- British Academy Television Awards
- List of American television awards
