= Evertz Microsystems =

Canadian electronics corporation

Evertz Microsystems Limited
- Company type: Public
- Traded as: TSX: ET
- Industry: Broadcast engineering
- Founded: Scarborough, Ontario (1966)
- Founder: Dieter Evertz, Rose Evertz
- Headquarters: Burlington, Ontario, Canada
- Area served: Worldwide
- Key people: Romolo Magarelli (CEO); Douglas DeBruin (Chairman); Rakesh Patel (CTO)
- Products: Electronics
- Revenue: ▼CAD$ 502 million (2025)
- Net income: ▼CAD$ 59.8 million (2025)
- Total assets: ▼CAD$ 469 million (2025)
- Number of employees: 2000
- Website: evertz.com av.evertz.com evertz.io

Evertz Microsystems Limited is a Canadian multinational developer of software and hardware products and services for the broadcast industry. The company designs, manufactures, and markets video and audio infrastructure equipment and solutions for the television broadcast, telecommunications, professional audio-visual, government, military, enterprise, and new media sectors. Evertz offers systems for signal routing, distribution, monitoring, and content management, along with support for high-definition, Ultra HD (4K/8K), and high dynamic range (HDR) formats. The company also provides cloud-based virtualized technologies and software-defined solutions for video processing and delivery.

Evertz supplies hardware and software solutions to a global customer base which includes: media and entertainment companies (Warner Bros. Discovery, ESPN, NBC, Rogers, Mediaset, Groupe M6, DAZN), broadcasters (Telemundo, MTVA, SBS, Euromedia, TVN Group), sports leagues and teams (NFL, NBA, NHL, MLB, RBFA), major events (Super Bowl, World Cup, Olympics, UEFA EURO), network providers (Lumen, GlobeCast), Esports (Electronic Arts (EA) Competitive Gaming, Riot Games), OB/mobile production (NEP Group, Game Creek Video), colleges/universities (Notre Dame, SMU), theatres/venues (Grand Ole Opry, Metropolitan Opera, Rudolfinum), and more.

Evertz was founded in 1966 as DynaQuip Electron Devices Limited by Dieter and Rose Evertz, specializing in equipment for film timecode and closed captioning. The company was renamed Evertz Microsystems Limited from Evertz Technologies Limited in 1983. In 1997, it was purchased and reorganized by a group of former employees of Leitch Technology (now owned by Harris Corporation).

Evertz held an initial public offering in June 2006 and raised $67 million CAD, listing its stock on the Toronto Stock Exchange. In June, 2011, Evertz announced it would buy back as many as 3.8 million of its 74.47 million outstanding shares.

== Acquisitions ==
Evertz acquired router manufacturer Quartz Electronics in 2005 and software developer Pharos Communications in 2011.

In 2012, Evertz acquired the manufacturer of the Simulsat multi-beam RF signal antenna, Antenna Technology Communications Inc. (ATCi). ATCi also provides teleport services such as RF uplink, downlink and disaster recovery.

In 2018, Evertz acquired Quintech Electronics & Communication Inc., a manufacturer of RF switching products.

In October 2020, Evertz acquired Norwegian streaming and graphics software company Ease Live AS.

On February 9, 2021, Evertz acquired the iconic Studer audio brand from HARMAN International.

== Awards ==
In 2008, Evertz was awarded the Philo T. Farnsworth Corporate Achievement Award, which is a Primetime Emmy award given by the Academy of Television Arts & Sciences to honor companies which have significantly affected the state of television and broadcast engineering over a long period of time.

In 2016, the National Academy of Television Arts & Sciences (NATAS) awarded Evertz a Technology & Engineering Emmy Award for Live Production Technology Beyond HD to Achieve Non-Interpolated Video for Instant Replay in reference to its DreamCatcher product line. Additionally, in 2019, NATAS awarded Evertz a Technology & Engineering Emmy Award for Pioneering Public Cloud Based linear Media Supply Chains in reference to its Mediator-X, OvertureRT-LIVE, and Render-X products.
