= Armchair Detective =

American TV game series (1949)

- Country of origin: United States
- Original language: English

Original release
- Network: CBS
- Release: July 6 – September 28, 1949

Armchair Detective is an American television game show that was broadcast on CBS from July 6, 1949, through September 28, 1949. It was the first CBS TV program to originate on the West Coast and be shown in the East and Midwest via kinescope recordings, and it was nominated for the Most Popular Television Program Emmy Award in 1949.

== Overview ==
Each week's episode contained two one-act mysteries with John Milton Kennedy as a Mr. Crime Investigator and H. Allen Smith as Mr. Crime Authority. At the end of each play, Smith explained how clues in that skit related to the solution of the mystery.

== Production ==
Armchair Detective originated from KTLA-TV in Los Angeles. The sponsor was Whitehall Pharmacal Company. Mike Stokey was the producer. It was broadcast on Wednesdays from 9 to 9:30 p.m. Eastern Time.

== Critical response ==
A review of the premiere episode in the trade publication Variety found the kinescope flawed in comparison to live transmissions, which had been customary for many viewers on the East Coast. "Kine," the review said, "as was to be expected, came out on the losing end of the deal." Specifically the review mentioned "considerable haze" on the kinescope and excessive brightness that "at times washed out the action on the screen fringes". Beyond that problem, the review said that Armchair Detective "was as good as many eastern programs", holding interest for fans of mystery shows. It said that the cast was "capable".

A review in the trade publication Billboard said that the show's basic concept was sound, but "Even an armchair detective would have trouble finding a clue to any sort of entertainment in the program". In addition to having "two utterly trite and transparent stories", the review said, "the entire presentation ... acting, staging, lighting, script — was so dreadful as to be acutely embarrassing."
