= Philo T. Farnsworth Award =

Television engineering and technology award

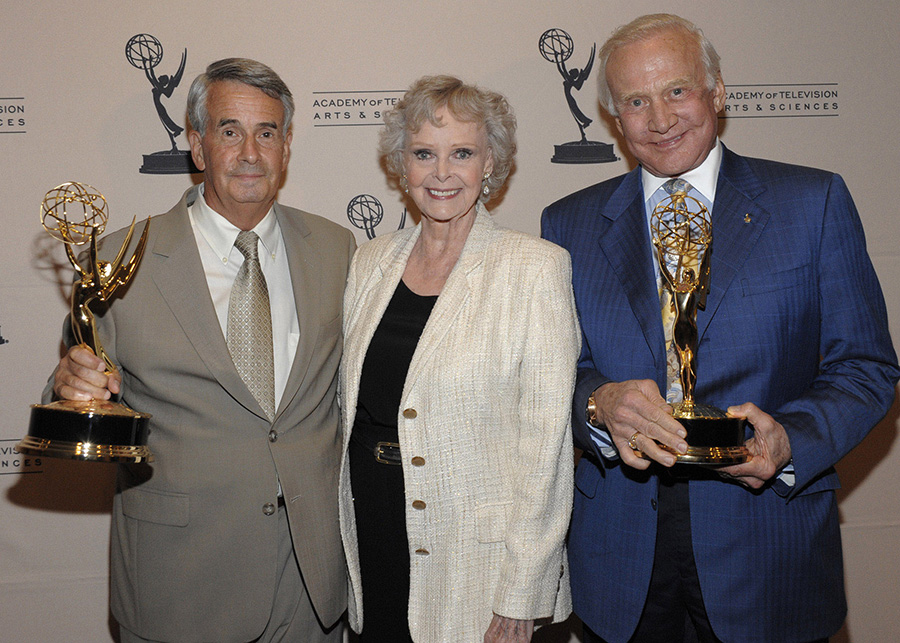
- The Philo T. Farnsworth Award being accepted by Goddard Space Flight Center engineer Richard Nafzger, actress June Lockhart, and Apollo 11 astronaut Buzz Aldrin on behalf of NASA in 2009.
- Awarded for: "An agency, company or institution whose contributions over time have significantly impacted television technology and engineering"
- Country: United States
- Presented by: Academy of Television Arts & Sciences
- Reward: Statuette
- First award: 2003
- Currently held by: Chapman/Leonard Studio Equipment Inc. (2026)
- Website: Official website

The Philo T. Farnsworth Award (also called the Philo T. Farnsworth Corporate Achievement Award) is a non-competitive award presented by the Academy of Television Arts & Sciences (ATAS) as part of the Primetime Engineering Emmy Awards to "an agency, company or institution whose contributions over time have significantly impacted television technology and engineering". Named for Philo Farnsworth, the inventor of the first fully working all-electronic television system and receiver, the recipient is selected by a jury of television engineers from ATAS's Engineering Emmy Awards Committee, who consider "all engineering developments which have proven their efficacy during the awards year and determines which, if any, merit recognition with an Engineering Emmy statuette". The accolade was first awarded in 2003 as a result of about a year of lobbying to ATAS by Farnsworth's wife Pam Farnsworth and Hawaii-based Skinner Entertainment management and production firm owner Georja Skinner.

At an annual award ceremony held in various locations, the ATAS presents the recipient with a copper, gold, nickel and silver statuette of a winged woman holding an atom that was designed by engineer Louis McManus. It was first presented at the 55th Primetime Engineering Emmy Awards ceremony in September 2003. Motion picture equipment company Panavision was selected as the inaugural recipient for its work in developing "specialty camera items, cranes and dollies, Video assists, 35mm optics, cameras, lighting, trucks and grips". Since then, another 21 agencies, companies and institutions have received the award and none have been presented it more than once. No award was given between 2005 and 2007 and in 2020. It has been presented to two separate recipients for different reasons in a calendar year once, in 2010, to the Desilu production company and the Digidesign audio technology firm. As of the 78th Primetime Engineering Emmy Awards in 2026, Chapman/Leonard Studio Equipment Inc. is the most recent recipient in this category for its role in "leading and pioneering custom camera support equipment manufacturer and supplier for television and motion picture productions".

== Recipients ==
List of Philo T. Farnsworth Award recipients
Year	Recipient	Nationality	Rationale	Ref.
2003	Panavision	United States	"for its cumulative feats in the advancements of specialty camera items, cranes and dollies, Video assists, 35mm optics, cameras, lighting, trucks and grips"	
2004	Chyron Corporation	United States	"for inventing and developing the character generator"	
2005–2007	Not awarded			
2008	Evertz Microsystems	Canada	"for the design, manufacture and marketing of video and audio infrastructure equipment for the production, post production, broadcast and Internet Protocol television"	
2009	NASA	United States	"in commemoration of the 40th anniversary of the technological innovations that led to the first broadcast from the Moon by Apollo 11 astronauts on July 20, 1969"	
2010	Desilu	United States	"for innovating the multi-camera film setup before a live studio audience"	
2010	Digidesign	United States	"commemorates Digidesign's historic role while recognizing its ongoing industry importance"	
2011	Time Warner	United States	"for their pioneering work in bringing true interactive and versatile on-demand television to audiences as exemplified by the Full Service Network"	
2011	Time Warner Cable	United States	"for their pioneering work in bringing true interactive and versatile on-demand television to audiences as exemplified by the Full Service Network"	
2012	Kodak	United States	"for its impact on television technology and engineering through innovation in image capture, processing and manipulation, as well as its research contributing to the invention of digital cameras"	
2013	Sennheiser	Germany	"helped to create innovative audio products and have provided impeccable customer service in the fields of TV and broadcasting"	
2014	Society of Motion Picture and Television Engineers	United States	"for the impact of [their] work in advancing the creation, production, and delivery of television content and services"	
2015	Grass Valley	Canada	"for its five-decade history of providing the tools to create signal infrastructure as the television industry grew; for its years of leadership in video routing, switching and manipulation; and for its industry-changing, pioneering strides in digital-image processing and effects"	
2016	NHK Science & Technology Research Laboratories	Japan	"for the development across several decades of pioneering technologies which have expanded the possibilities of broadcasting technology in Japan and all over the world"	
2017	Sony	Japan	"Sony Corporation's contributions in technology, content and services have significantly influenced all areas of television production"	
2018	Avid	United States	"to honor 30 years of continuous, transformative technology innovations, including products that have improved and accelerated the entire editing and post production process for television"	
2019	American Society of Cinematographers	United States	"for the organization's 100 years of commitment to excellence in motion-picture image making"	
2020	Not awarded			
2021	Dolby	United States	"for its contributions to TV technology and engineering from its early work on noise reduction and Dolby Stereo to its Dolby Atmos immersive sound and Dolby Vision high dynamic range technologies"	
2022	Arri	Germany	"for its more than a century of designing and manufacturing camera and lighting systems as well as its development of systemic technological solutions and service networks for a worldwide complex of film, broadcast, and media industries."	
2023	National Association of Broadcasters	United States	"The award recognizes NAB's centennial anniversary as 'the voice of America's broadcasters', working to advance their interests through public policy advocacy, educational initiatives and support for content and technology innovation. NAB has played a part in major technological and engineering milestones throughout television history, including: the development of the digital television standard, the development of the ATSC 3.0 broadcast standard and supporting the ongoing NextGen TV transition, stereo sound for analog television, UHF channel allocation and the inclusion of V-chips in television sets."	
2024	Adobe Inc.	United States	"For over 40 years, Adobe has been a leader in delivering groundbreaking technology that empowers everyone, everywhere to express themselves and bring their stories to life. From students to creative professionals, and from small businesses to the world's largest enterprises, Adobe's customers use Adobe tools to unleash their creativity, accelerate document productivity and power digital businesses — including Adobe Acrobat; Creative Cloud tools such as Premiere Pro, Photoshop, After Effects and Adobe Express; Substance 3D collection; collaboration tools like Frame.io; and Experience Cloud enterprise solutions, such as Adobe GenStudio."	
2025	BBC Research & Development	United Kingdom	"Since its founding in 1930, the team has led the way in breakthroughs that became everyday essentials — like FM radio, stereo sound and the Radio Data System that sends song titles and traffic updates to car radios. Over the decades, they’ve been central to important advancements in television, playing a pivotal role in the development and standardization of High-Definition Television (HDTV), Ultra High-Definition Television (UHDTV), Hybrid Log-Gamma (HLG) for the carriage of High Dynamic Range (HDR) information and 5G networks. Looking ahead, their work continues to help define the future of television in its research on Augmented Reality (AR) and Virtual Reality (VR). BBC Research & Development continues to lead and participate in the important industry collaboration on the impact and use of Artificial Intelligence (AI). As co-founders of the Coalition for Content Provenance and Authenticity, BBC Research & Development is also helping to create standards that will allow media creators to understand better human/AI collaboration and copyrightability of AI-generated media."	
2026	Chapman/Leonard Studio Equipment Inc.	United States	"For more than 80 years, Chapman/Leonard has been a leading and pioneering custom camera support equipment manufacturer and supplier for television and motion picture productions, accredited with fundamentally expanding the creative possibilities of camera movement in production. The company’s original Hercules Mobile Crane offered crab steering, an electric battery drive and first-of-its-kind hydraulic self-leveling. The Lenny Arm became an industry standard for its modular design, wide payload and high reach. Their Hustler and PeeWee dolly series provided responsive boom hydraulics, maneuverability, and versatility on and off track. Their work in sports broadcasting led to the development of its Olympian series of sideline vehicles utilized in the Olympics and NFL. Chapman/Leonard continues to push boundaries with new inventions big and small, like the Hydroscope Telescoping Crane, which can be submerged underwater, and its smallest dolly, which utilizes a 4-stage nitrogen pneumatic column."	

== Statistics ==
Awards by country
Country	Wins
United States	15
Canada	2
Germany	2
Japan	2
United Kingdom	1
