= Shirley Dinsdale =

American ventriloquist, television and radio personality (1926–1999)

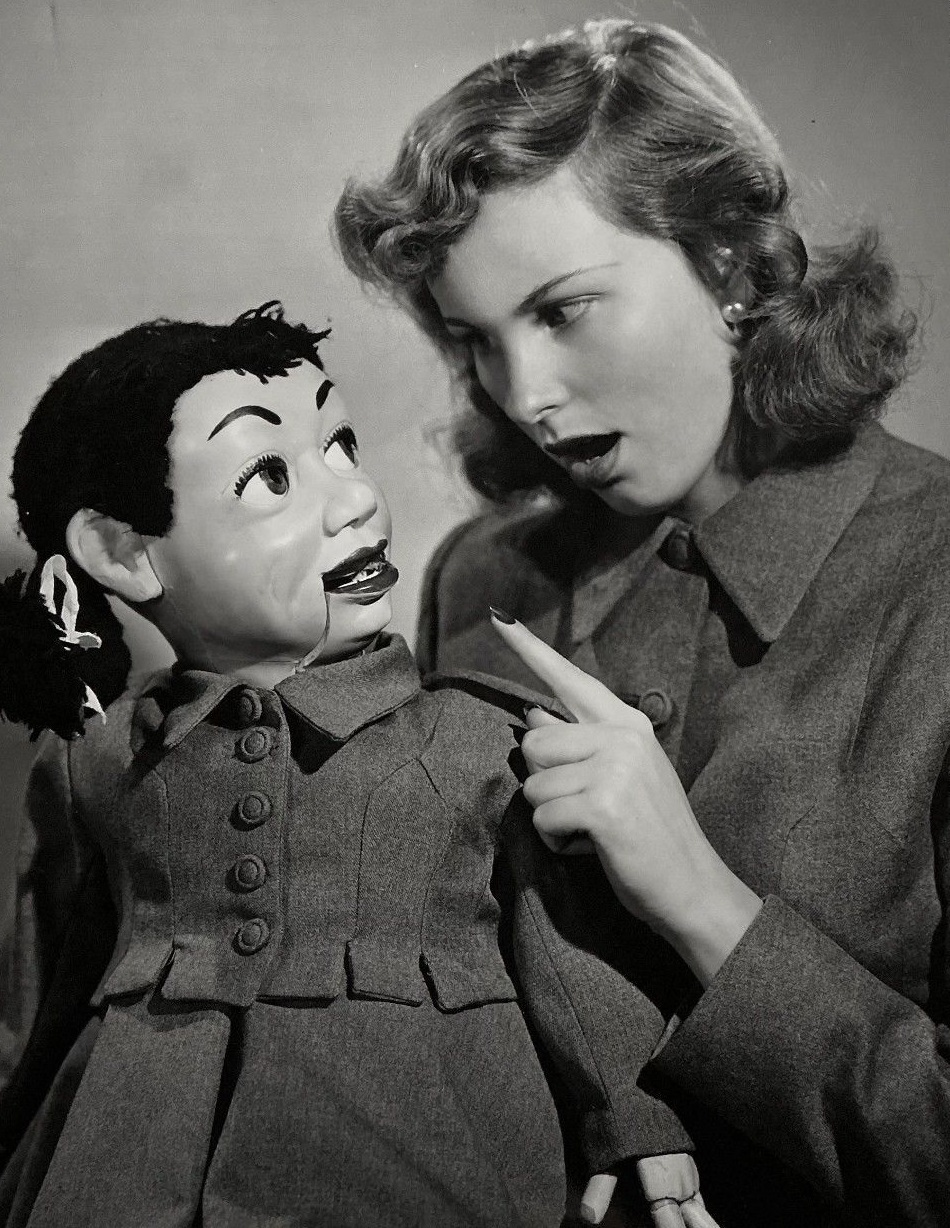
- Born: Shirley L Dinsdale Layburn; October 31, 1926; San Francisco, California, U.S.
- Died: May 9, 1999 (aged 72); Stony Brook, New York, U.S.
- Education: Stony Brook University
- Occupations: Ventriloquist/TV and radio personality
- Years active: 1940–1986
- Spouse: Frank Layburn (1953–her death) 2 children

Shirley Dinsdale Layburn (October 31, 1926 – May 9, 1999), better known by her maiden name of Shirley Dinsdale, was an American ventriloquist and television and radio personality of the 1940s and early 1950s.

She is best remembered for her dummy "Judy Splinters" and for the early 15-minute children's television show that bears that name. In 1949, she received the first Emmy award (first award in the first presentation) for Outstanding Television Personality when she was a student at UCLA. After her television career, she also achieved success in a second career as a cardiopulmonary therapist.

== Early life ==
Dinsdale was born in San Francisco, California in 1926. After being badly burned in a household accident when she was 5 years old, she was given a ventriloquist's dummy by her father, who manufactured dummies for department stores, as part of her recovery. That dummy, which she named Judy Splinters, inspired her to make her break into radio. Lawrence Johnson, a ventriloquist, helped Dinsdale improve her natural talent for throwing her voice.

Dinsdale was an A student at Drew School in San Francisco. By the time she was 16, she had received a Distinguished Honor Citation from the United States government for her promotion of war bonds. During World War II, she was student chairman for Southern California Schools at War.

== Career ==
=== Radio ===
Dinsdale made her start in radio in 1941 with Judy in Wonderland on KGO in San Francisco. The program later moved to KPO in San Francisco.

In 1942, she and her family moved to Los Angeles and she was given a spot on Eddie Cantor's program. She was called "radio's most refreshing discovery in years." A successful season on Nelson Eddy's The Electric Hour program on CBS in 1945 led to a tour lasting almost 11 months, during which she visited patients in military hospitals under the auspices of the United Service Organizations and participated in more than 500 USO shows during that span.

=== Television ===
During World War II, she was an active member of the Hollywood Victory Committee. After the war, she made her break into the budding television industry on KTLA (also in Los Angeles) doing show announcements, birthday greetings, and small spots. These spots, while not initially prominent, garnered her critical acclaim and an Emmy award for Outstanding Television Personality (the award was given jointly to both her and her puppet). This was the first Emmy award ever presented at the ceremony for the 1st Primetime Emmy Awards.

After receiving the award, Dinsdale was given her own weekly children's show (entitled simply Judy Splinters), which ran from June 13, 1949, to June 30, 1950, on NBC. It originated at KNBH in Los Angeles and was shown in the Midwest and East via Kinescope. In the years following, she had shows in both Chicago and New York City.

== Post-ventriloquism career ==
In 1953, she embarked on the second phase of her life: retiring from show business, getting married and having two children. She remained married till her death.

In 1958, she appeared as a guest challenger on the TV panel show To Tell the Truth.

In 1970, Dinsdale enrolled at the State University of New York at Stony Brook to study respiratory and cardiopulmonary therapy. She graduated class of 1972. Dinsdale served as the head of the Respiratory Therapy Department at John T. Mather Memorial Hospital in Port Jefferson, New York, from 1973 to her second retirement in 1986.

== Family and death ==
On July 14, 1953, Dinsdale married Frank Layburn, a field engineer, in Springfield, Massachusetts.

She died from cancer on May 9, 1999, at her home in Stony Brook, New York. Survivors included her husband, a son, a daughter, and two grandchildren.
