= Fu's subcutaneous needle =

Fu's Subcutaneous Needle (FSN), invented by Dr. Zhonghua Fu in 1996, is a method for the treatment of myofascial pain and trigger points related to Traditional Chinese Medicine (TCM) and invented by Dr. D. Simons and Dr. Janet G. Travell.

FSN does not follow the rules and principles of TCM and the chosen insertion points do not coincide with traditional acupuncture points. The similarities are limited to the distal insertion of the needle to the affected area, the needle itself being a non-injection needle, and the fact that both needles are manipulated and act on soft connective tissue. FSN abstains from the muscle and deep fascia layers and is confined to only the subcutaneous layer where collagen fibers are most abundant. As the subcutaneous layer is poorly innervated, pain is less than other needling therapies.

FSN is also currently being used to treat non-musculoskeletal conditions; however more research is to be carried out to conclude its effectiveness.

== Mechanism ==
FSN and traditional acupuncture may both share the same mechanism of action in terms of the measurable or physiological effects they relate on the body.

The described effects of FSN on the body are by means of mechanotransduction as the swaying of the needle reportedly triggers a response on the connective tissue, specifically the collagen fibers by stimulating signal transduction and gene expression in fibroblasts of the subcutaneous tissue.

A drawing or magnetic effect on connective tissue has been observed upon needle manipulation as the contraction and shape changes of fibroblasts cause pulling of collagen fibers and secondary alignment of fibroblasts and collagen fibers. During manipulation of the needle, collagen fibers would wind and tighten around the needle shaft, and dispersing of nociceptive substances and PH balance has also been observed in skeletal muscles. As collagen fibers are most abundant in the subcutaneous layer, this may explain why FSN exhibits a more immediate effect than traditional acupuncture in relieving muscle dysfunction as the FSN comes into contact with more connective tissue during needle manipulation.

== Development ==
Zhonghua Fu runs a clinic in Nanjing, China, affiliated with Nanjing University of Chinese Medicine. At the FSN clinic for pain medicine, FSN is used as the sole means to treat musculoskeletal disorders and some chronic benign visceral disorders.

Fu originally trained as a TCM doctor, completing his masters in acupuncture. While practicing and teaching traditional acupuncture in Guangzhou, he realized that several innovations were needed to improve and accelerate the acupuncture effect. Because some techniques for painful problems in the ancient Huangdi Neijing were punctured obliquely surrounding some painful spots, Fu thought inserting horizontally was a good choice, and then FSN came into being after a number of trials.

After completing his Ph.D., Fu conducted research in his lab for two years on arthritic rats. During these trials, when the needle was inserted into the local point of sensitivity, there were no profound changes in VAS and range of motion. Notable changes in VAS and range of motion were observed however when the needle was inserted parallel to the skin surface.

== The FSN needle ==
The FSN needle is a modified trocar needle similar to an I.V. Catheter and has been patented in China. There are 3 parts to the needle: soft tube, protecting sheath, and needle core. The needle core is 31 mm in length and 1 mm in diameter. Each needle is individually packaged and sterilized with ethylene oxide gas.
