= Louis McManus =

American television engineer, film editor, and designer (1898–1968)

- Born: Louis Manuel McManus; May 31, 1898; Mexico
- Died: April 17, 1968 (aged 69); Los Angeles, California, U.S.
- Occupations: Film editor Film engineer Designer
- Awards: Special Emmy Award

Louis Manuel McManus (May 31, 1898 – April 17, 1968) was an American television engineer, film editor, and designer of the 1930s and 1940s. He is best known as the designer for the appearance of the Emmy award statuette and symbol for the Academy of Television Arts & Sciences.

During the 1930s, McManus worked primarily as an editor and edited many films and shorts, including those featuring Laurel and Hardy and the Our Gang characters. In addition to editing, he also designed the title cards for many films.

It was his work as a designer that inspired him to submit a design entry for the Emmy award in 1948. He used his wife, Dorothy, as a model for the figure. His design was ultimately chosen for the award, out of a field of forty-eight other proposals submitted.

McManus was awarded an Emmy statue (in the Special Award category) in 1949 (the first year awards were presented) for his work in designing the Emmy.
