= 2nd Primetime Emmy Awards =

- Date: January 27, 1950
- Location: Ambassador Hotel, Los Angeles, California
- Presented by: Academy of Television Arts and Sciences
- Hosted by: Bill Welsh

Highlights
- Best Kinescope Show: Texaco Star Theater
- Best Live Show: The Ed Wynn Show
- Best Public Service, Cultural or Educational Program: Crusade in Europe

Television/radio coverage
- Network: KFI

The 2nd Emmy Awards, retroactively known as the 2nd Primetime Emmy Awards after the debut of the Daytime Emmy Awards, were presented at the Ambassador Hotel in Los Angeles, California on January 27, 1950. Like the 1st Primetime Emmy Awards, Emmys were primarily given out to Los Angeles–based TV shows and stations. The Awards Committee was chaired by Martha Gaston Bigelow of KFOX radio.

Several new award categories were introduced, including "Best Sports Coverage". However, it would be a few decades later until that category would become a permanent fixture in the Sports Emmys.

== Winners and nominees ==
Winners are listed first, highlighted in boldface, and indicated with a double dagger (‡).

=== Programs ===
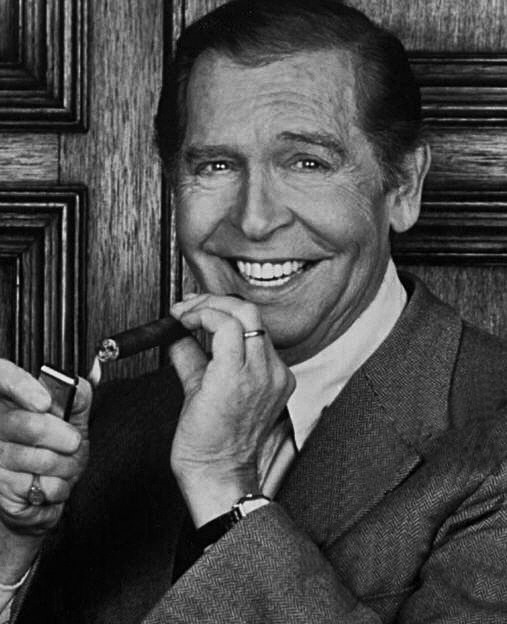
Milton Berle, Most Outstanding Kinescoped Personality winner

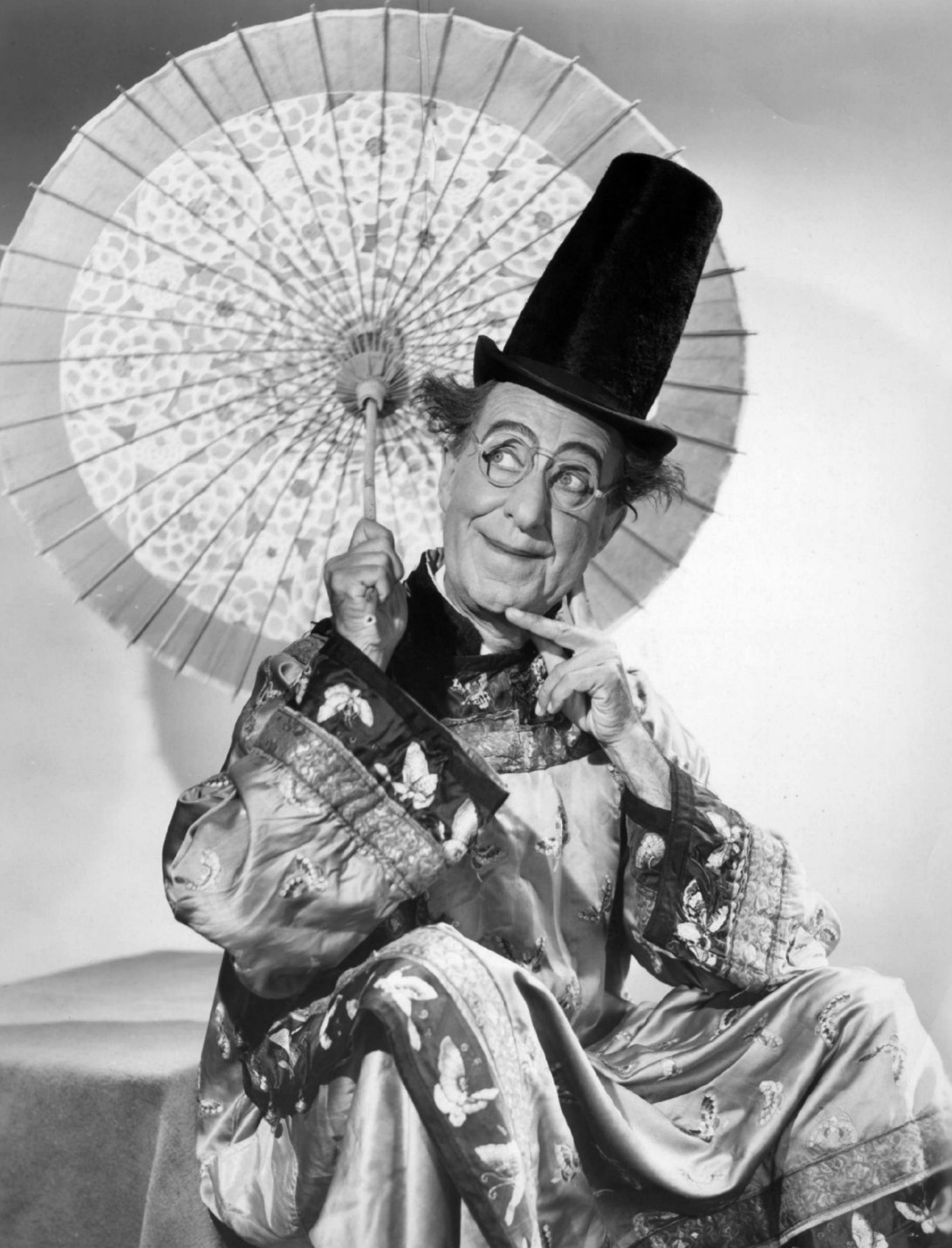
Ed Wynn, Most Outstanding Live Personality winner

Programs
**Best Kinescope Show**: **Texaco Star Theatre (KNBH)**‡; Studio One (KTTV); The Fred Waring Show (KTTV); The Goldbergs (KTTV)	**Best Children's Show**: **Time for Beany (KTLA)**‡; Cyclone Malone (KNBH); Kukla, Fran and Ollie (KNBH)
**Best Live Show**: **The Ed Wynn Show (KTTV)**‡; Pantomime Quiz (KTTV); Your Witness (KECA)	**Best Public Service, Cultural, or Educational Program**: **Crusade in Europe (KTTV)**‡; Ford News and Weather (KNBH); Kathy Fiscus Rescue (KTLA); Man's Best Friend (KTLA); Nuremberg Trials (KTSL); Teleforum (KTLA)

=== Hosting ===
Hosting
**Most Outstanding Kinescoped Personality**: **Milton Berle (KNBH)**‡; Fran Allison (KNBH); Arthur Godfrey (KTTV)	**Most Outstanding Live Personality**: **Ed Wynn (KTTV)**‡; Tom Harmon (KECA and KFI); Mike Stokey (KTTV and KTLA); Bill Welsh (KFI and KTLA)

=== Sports ===
Sports
**Best Sports Coverage**
- **Wrestling (KTLA)**‡
  - Amateur Boxing (KTLA)
  - Baseball (KLAC)
  - College Basketball (KTTV)
  - Ice Hockey (KTLA)
  - USC-UCLA Football (KECA)

=== Best Commercial ===
- **Lucky Strike**
