= Full Service Network =

Full Service Network, also known as FSN, was an 18-month trial interactive television service launched by Time Warner Inc. in Orlando, Florida. The FSN was active between 1994 and 1997 targeting an initial number of 4,000 households with services that ranged from video-on-demand to ordering fast food using just the TV remote. At its time, it was dubbed the "most futuristic network introduced so far."

The trial aimed to study how interactive services would work, as well as their costs and advertising capabilities. It also aimed to find out "what people will want when the equipment that is now so expensive becomes affordable several years down the road."

== Concept ==
Time Warner's Full Service Network was described as "the first in the world to integrate emerging cable, computer, and telephone technologies over a fiber-optic and coaxial cable network." This meant that the service offered traditional cable, interactive television, telephone services, and high-speed PC access to on-line services.

Regardless of its first-time advantages, the FSN was not television's first attempt at interactivity, nor was it Time Warner Cable's first attempt. Previous efforts included 1977's QUBE, a service offered by Warner-Amex (a joint venture between Warner Cable and American Express) initially in Columbus, OH, then expanding into cities such as Dallas, and Pittsburgh; as well as the 1950s children television show Winky Dink and You, which prompted interactivity through the use of plastics 'Magic Screens' that parents would place on the actual television display so kids could draw on them.

However, the FSN's service was very similar to 2008 interactive services. Users would be plugged into the network using set top boxes and selecting the offerings of their choice using just the remote control. The drawback: the cost of set top-boxes was extremely high in the 1990s (over $1000.)

According to Gerald M. Levin, chairman and CEO of Time Warner at the time, the FSN was part of the company's strategy for driving the growth of its copyright businesses:

We are the largest creator and distributor of copyrights in the world, and as the first to deploy the FSN – an entirely new distribution channel – we can now accurately assess the potential for such on-demand programming as movies, sports, news, advertising, shopping, education, games, music and more. This knowledge, and having it before anyone else, will give us a competitive advantage ... Over the long term, the FSN opens a whole new world of distribution opportunities for every division of Time Warner. It will challenge us to do more of what we do best: create the most innovative information and entertainment content anywhere in the world.

== History ==
The FSN's first households were plugged-in in December 1994 in Orlando, Florida.

According to the Hong Kong University of Science and Technology, the city of Orlando was chosen because of its worry-free weather, the fact that it was Time Warner Cable's second largest division and because it already featured fiber-optic network installations (which would reduce implementation costs.) The city's high growth demographics, with large percentages of households with children, complemented the decision.

The specific test area was suburban Orlando, including southwest Seminole County and parts of Orange County (Wekiva, Sweetwater, Lake Brantley, and Spring Lake Hills).

Available interactive services were added to the network bit by bit. They included on-demand games, sports and movies, food ordering, and also local information, events and shopping opportunities through GOtv, an interactive entertainment guide.

GOtv worked in association with other media, such as The Orlando Sentinel, in compiling reviews and other information on restaurants, their menus, prices, location and hours.

In 1996, the services of FSN were made available for the general public to check out at Walt Disney World's Epcot Center Innoventions expo, where "Five stations are available for guests to interact with the television through the network's Carousel navigator."

Michael Colglazier, General Manager of Innoventions, qualified the technology as life changing, and was very pleased to offer the Disney's guests a chance to experience it.

The Orlando Business Journal announced in 1997 the closing of the Full Service Network. The article listed as the reason Time Warner's shifting emphasis toward an evolved form of the technology being developed by outside companies under contract with Time Warner Cable.

The company had 156 employees at the time at its main office in Maitland.

== Partner services ==
Hewlett-Packard was one of the early partners of the FSN, which was also the only trial to offer full-page, color printing for interactive television.

HP participated "to learn about the printing and order fulfillment needs of interactive-TV users, service providers and advertisers".

The service aimed to offer users the possibility to print out the information available in the FSN's interactive guides, as well as the map locations for shops and restaurants, or ticket events.

As for pizza, Pizza Hut was the FSN partner. The service offered users the chance to order pizza, drinks and other products from the chain's menu using their remote.

This, according to Pizza Hut's spokesperson, Chris Romoser, represented an advantage for everyone involved: users had to press fewer buttons on their remote control than they would have to dialing for delivery, and less restaurant-employee time will be required for the completion of the ordering process.

According to Tom Feige, president of the FSN:

Pizza Hut is a great example of how FSN customers not only watch television, they use television as well. The future of television lies in its potential to give users greater choice, convenience and control of their viewing habits and consumer activities.
