= 1st Primetime Emmy Awards =

1949 television awards event

- Date: January 25, 1949
- Location: Hollywood Athletic Club, Los Angeles, California
- Presented by: Academy of Television Arts and Sciences
- Hosted by: Walter O'Keefe

Highlights
- Most Popular Television Program: Pantomime Quiz Time

Television/radio coverage
- Network: KTSL

The 1st Emmy Awards, retroactively known as the 1st Primetime Emmy Awards after the debut of the counterpart Daytime Emmy Awards, were presented at the Hollywood Athletic Club in Los Angeles on Tuesday, January 25, 1949. Only shows produced in Los Angeles County, California and aired in the Los Angeles media market were eligible to win. The awards were hosted by Walter O'Keefe who substituted for Rudy Vallée when he had to leave town at the last minute. A special award category was introduced and awarded to Louis McManus for designing the actual Emmy Award statuette.

== Winners and nominees ==
Winners are listed first, highlighted in boldface, and indicated with a double dagger (‡).

=== Programs ===
Programs
**Most Popular Television Program**: **Pantomime Quiz (KTLA)**‡; Armchair Detective (KTLA); Don Lee Music Hall (KTSL); Felix De Cola Show (KTLA); Judy Splinters (KTLA); Mabel's Fables (KTLA); Masked Spooner (KTSL); Treasure of Literature (KFI-TV); Tuesday Varieties (KTLA); What's the Name of that Song (KTSL)	**Best Film Made for Television**: **The Necklace (Your Show Time Series)**‡; Christopher Columbus; Hollywood Brevities; It Could Happen to You; Tell Tale Heart; Time Signal

=== Hosting ===
Hosting
**Most Outstanding Television Personality**
- **Shirley Dinsdale**‡
  - Rita LeRoy
  - Patricia Morison
  - Mike Stokey
  - Bill Welsh

==== Station Award ====
- KTLA for Outstanding Overall Performance in 1948

==== Special Award ====
- Louis McManus – for designing the Emmy Award statuette.

McManus was presented with a plaque as an award instead of a copy of the very statue which he was being honored for.

==== Technical Award ====
- Charles Mesak of Don Lee Television for the introduction of TV camera technology Phasefader
