= Syd Cassyd =

- Born: Sydney Cassyd; December 28, 1908; Teaneck, New Jersey, U.S.
- Died: February 4, 2000 (aged 91); Los Angeles, California, U.S.
- Occupation: Television executive
- Known for: Founder of the Academy of Television Arts & Sciences
- Spouse: Miriam Kirshenbaum (m. 1938)

Sydney Cassyd (December 28, 1908 – February 4, 2000) was the founder of the Academy of Television Arts & Sciences in 1946.

== Biography ==
Born in Teaneck, New Jersey, Cassyd worked for the Army Signal Corps as a film editor under then-Col. Frank Capra during World War II. After the war, Cassyd moved to Hollywood, where he worked as an editor for Box Office magazine, as well as a grip at Paramount Pictures.

It was at Paramount that he met and teamed up with TV groundbreaker Klaus Landsberg, known for, among other things, pioneering live TV news coverage. Cassyd and Landsberg worked on an experimental Los Angeles television station that would eventually become KTLA-TV Channel 5.

While at KTLA, Cassyd felt that TV needed an organization in which people could share their ideas about the fledgling medium and talk about the future of the industry. He founded the academy with seven people who came to the first meeting. By the fifth meeting, there were 250 members.

Cassyd founded the Academy of Television Arts & Sciences in 1946, which has grown into one of the most influential organizations in the entertainment industry. In addition to sponsoring the annual Emmy Awards, which recognize outstanding entertainment and news achievement in television, the academy has a variety of outreach and archival programs.

Cassyd became the fourth president of the academy in 1950 and over the years held various other positions. In 1991, the academy's board of governors created the Syd Cassyd Founder's Award in his honor and presented the first to him.

Cassyd died at his home in Los Angeles, at the age of 91.

== Awards and honors ==
In 1996, Cassyd received a star on the Hollywood Walk of Fame.
