= Hollywood Athletic Club =

Building in Los Angeles, California

Coordinates: 34.098157°N 118.331961°W

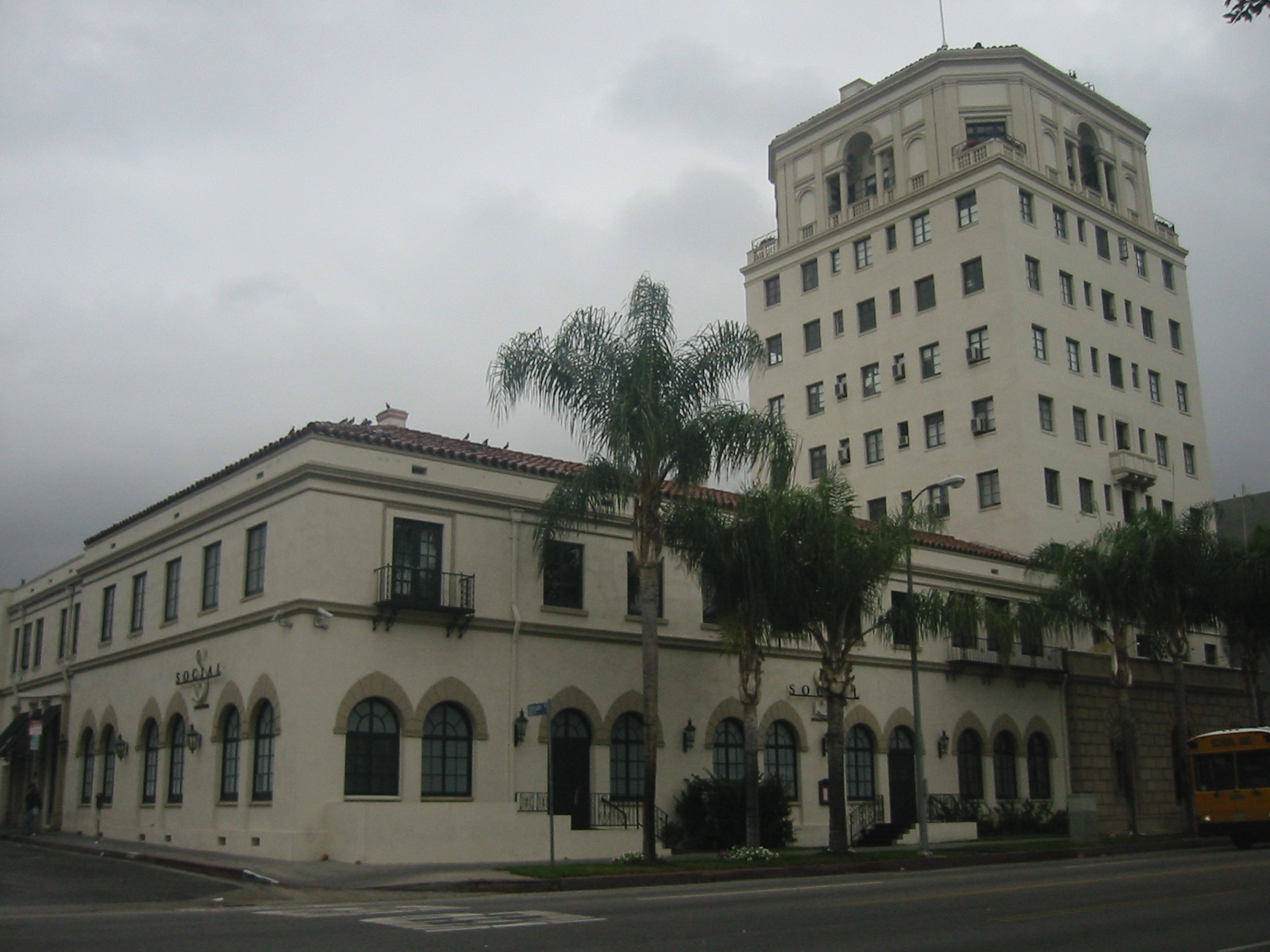
Hollywood Athletic Club

The Hollywood Athletic Club is an office building and event space in the Hollywood district of Los Angeles.

Since it was built in 1924, it has had a varied history as a health club, bar, music venue, and billiard room.

It is located on Sunset Boulevard.

== History ==
The building at 6525 Sunset Blvd has been known as the Hollywood Athletic Club, University of Judaism, Berwin Entertainment Complex, and Hollywood Landmark. It was completed in 1924 and designed by Meyer & Holler, the same architectural firm that built the Grauman's Chinese Theatre and the Egyptian Theatre. At the time, it was the tallest building in Hollywood.

When the Hollywood Athletic Club opened in 1924, Hollywood was entering its greatest and most productive period. The building was the tallest building in Hollywood and loomed above Sunset Boulevard. Membership was originally $150 for initiation fees and $10 for monthly dues.

During its early years as a health club, its membership included Johnny Weissmuller, Errol Flynn, Charlie Chaplin, John Wayne, Walt Disney, John Ford, Douglas Fairbanks Sr., Mary Pickford, Cecil B. deMille, Cornel Wilde, Humphrey Bogart, Clark Gable, Jean Harlow, George O'Brien, Frances X. Bushman, Howard Hughes, Joan Crawford, Rudolph Valentino, Mae West, Buster Crabbe, and Pola Negri.

When the building was first established, the first two floors and the basement were to be used only for clubbing. (Note: This statement may be about the Hollywood Athletic Club in Hollywood, FL. See note on Talk page.)

The building later became the University of Judaism, and after they started building at their new location, this building gradually fell into disrepair. The building was up for sale for eight years until concert promoter and investor Gary Berwin purchased it in 1978 and set about the huge task of restoring the building to its former grandeur.

Berwin also purchased the bungalows and the two-story Spanish-style building situated on Hudson behind 6525 Sunset Blvd. The project was renovated at a cost of approximately $11 million. The restaurant, which is a replica of the 14th century Davanzati Palace in Florence, Italy, underwent a complete makeover. The original ceilings had been covered over with a false ceiling and after it was removed, Berwin hired carpenters, artists, and wood carvers to restore the beams and ceilings.

The Berwin Entertainment Complex quickly became popular with the jet set and celebrities. Some of the famous tenants included the Beach Boys, Van Halen, Jose Feliciano, Island Records, and Baby-O Recording Studios. The list of celebrities who visited the building include Priscilla Presley, Lisa-Marie Presley, members of the Michael Jackson family, Steven Spielberg, Muhammad Ali (a regular visitor and friend), Mayor Tom Bradley, Sally Field, Princess Stephanie, Dudley Moore, Michael J Fox, Prince Mashour ben Saud of Saudi Arabia, Madonna, Rodney Dangerfield, Melanie Griffith, Lesley Ann Down, Jon Voigt, Paul Newman, George Lucas, Jaclyn Smith, Jane Fonda, Alice Cooper, Julio Iglesias, Stevie Wonder, Billy Crystal, Shirley McLane, and Gov. Jerry Brown.

Berwin donated office space and worked with Mayor Tom Bradley's office to start a program for runaway youth in Hollywood. The building served as a fund-raising entity for the March of Dimes, the American Cancer Society, the Los Angeles Library Association, and the Thalians. In November 1983, the State of California recognized Gary Berwin's renovation efforts with the Hollywood Beautification Award. Presented by Senator David Roberti, the award was given in the category of remodeled community property.

At the end of 1984, Berwin decided to take in a partner or sell the building and in February 1985 real estate broker Bill Beachem, representing the Michael Jackson family, came by the building and made Berwin an offer. The Jacksons, who at the time were the #1 entertainment family in the world, would buy the building and Berwin would retain a percentage as a partner. They intended to use a good portion of the 80,000 square feet (7,400 m^{2}) for offices and recording and rehearsal studios. Joe Jackson became an almost daily visitor to the building, the papers were signed, a deposit was put into escrow, phones were ordered, and a liquor license sign went up outside stating “Jackson/Berwin Entertainment.”

The Jacksons stipulated in the escrow instructions that while the building was in escrow, they would have final approval of everyone leasing space in the building. During this time period, many famous parties including record executive David Geffen, Studio 54, Maxim's of Paris, and Princess Stephanie of Monaco all came to the building inquiring about the possibility of renting space for studios and clubs, but the Jacksons would not approve any of them.

In 1983, Bryan Adams made his “Cuts Like A Knife” music video in the empty pool. It was directed by Steve Barron, produced by Simon Fields and Paul Flattery for Gowers, Fields Flattery/Limelight.

A critical scene of the film The Usual Suspects was filmed in one of the rooms of the club.

David Bowie performed at the club during his Earthling Tour on September 12, 1997.

The Hollywood Athletic Club was acquired by the Nourmand family 1986 and is still operated by them today.

== In popular culture ==
It has been featured in a variety of TV series and movies:

- Kiss Me Deadly (1955)
- Two Idiots in Hollywood (1988)
- Mad Men (2007–2015)
- Introducing Dorothy Dandridge (1999)
- Profiler (1996–2000)
- Unsolved Mysteries (1987–2010)
- Million Dollar Baby (2004)
- The Usual Suspects (1995)
- Scorpion (2014–2018)

Furthermore, it was also the location of director Quentin Tarantino's premiere party for his film Kill Bill: Volume 1.

== Notable members ==
- Arthur Alber, Los Angeles City Council member, 1927–29
