= The Angry Family =

- Everybody Loves Raymond episode
- Michael presenting a page of "The Angry Family" in class
- Episode no.: Season 6 Episode 1
- Directed by: Gary Halvorson
- Written by: Philip Rosenthal
- Cinematography by: Mike Berlin
- Editing by: Patricia Barnett
- Original air date: September 24, 2001
- Running time: 22 minutes

Guest appearances
- Elizabeth Anne Smith as Eileen; Charles Durning as Father Hubley; Richard Israel as Adam Burk; Rhyon Nicole Brown as Grace; Mitch Holleman as Ian

Episode chronology
← Previous "Ally's Birth"	Next → "No Roll"
- Everybody Loves Raymond (season 6)

"The Angry Family" is the season six premiere of the American sitcom Everybody Loves Raymond (1996–2005), a series about the titular Newsday sportswriter Ray Barone (Ray Romano) and his oddball family. In the episode, all of the Barones are in a counseling session after Ray's son Michael (Sullivan Sweeten) presents a short story in class about an "Angry Family," which they assume is about them. Directed by Gary Halvorson and written by series creator and showrunner Philip Rosenthal, the episode also features early roles for future Empire star Rhyon Nicole Brown and Reba star Mitch Holleman. Originally broadcast on CBS on September 24, 2001, "The Angry Family" has been critically well-received and was nominated for a Primetime Emmy Award for Outstanding Writing for a Comedy Series.

== Plot ==
The Barones attend a gathering at Michael's school, where the students present their own short stories to their parents. Michael showcases "The Angry Family," which depicts parents and grandparents angry at each other and screaming to the point of "hurt[ing] the kids' ears." Most of the parents show a hint of discomfort with the story, the Barones horrified. Ray, Debra, Frank, and Marie are hurt by their supposed portrayals in the story, Robert concerned about not even being mentioned. Ray blames Debra for the yelling, Debra retorting that Ray is the source of it. At a parent-teacher meeting Ray and Debra have with Eileen, Michael's teacher, they try to act as normal of a family as possible. However, this fails and Eileen mentions Debra is behaving in a similar way to the characters in "The Angry Family." Debra lashes out at the teacher, stating her feelings about his husband's relatives.

This leads to a counseling session involving the family, Father Hubley, Eileen, and counselor Adam Burk. When Burk asks for the origins of the family's anger, Marie points to Debra, who reacts negatively to the accusation. Robert, as an "outsider" of the family drama, claims Raymond to be the source due to being the center of love and affection by his relatives. Frank then suggests Marie, reasoning that she can't handle his son being married to Debra. The accusation leads to an enraged Marie commenting on modern society and the child psychology field's over-rewarding of the children and constant blame on mothers. Father Hubley concludes that there is no one source to the problem, that it's a result of all the family members being very close to each other, and that Michael's story was a "sweet" and "simple" way to send a message. The meeting ends with Hubley offering parenting books to the Barones. As Ray and Debra are about to go to bed, Michael comes to their room and tells them the book was actually inspired by the animated series Monster Maniacs, which depicts a family yelling at each other.

== Production ==
Show-runner Philip Rosenthal wrote "The Angry Family" based on an experience he had in 2001, when he saw his son Ben read a story for his elementary school project, also titled "The Angry Family" and about a mother and father squabbling with each other. Rosenthal admitted to conceiving the episode at Ben's presentation: "At first, I was mortified. And the very next split-second, I thought, 'How lucky am I that I have a son who writes such beautiful material for my television show?' I apologize to Ben for his therapy later, but listen, I've got a show to do." He later admitted "The Angry Family" was his favorite Raymond episode. "The Angry Family" is Gary Halvorson's 15th directing credit for Everybody Loves Raymond, after "High School," "The Letter," "Civil War," "How They Met," and a plethora of fifth season episodes.

== Analysis ==
Ashley Spurgeon described the premise of "The Angry Family" as a symbolic commentary of child characters being the worst parts of most sitcoms: "one of the kids writes a short story called 'The Angry Family,' and everyone has to go see a counselor." SUNY Press' book The Sitcom Reader (2016) suggested the twist of Michael's inspiration for his story being a TV series was a message of most families in sitcoms, including Raymond: "the Barones of Everybody Loves Raymond are flawed, hurtful, and selfish, but they love each other, and that premise endures everything will work out in the end."

== Reception ==
When "The Angry Family" first aired on September 24, 2001, it was the third highest-viewed program of the week; it had a Nielsen rating (a percentage of 100.8 million televisions) of 14.4 as a result of having 7 million viewers. Upon the initial airing of the episode, the Los Angeles Daily News scored it three-and-a-half stars out of four and claimed it "finds the writers and cast in championship-season form." The first half of the sixth season of Everybody Loves Raymond topped lists of best fall 2001 series from the Daily Herald and the Orlando Sentinel, both of which claimed "The Angry Family" to be a highlight of the season. Upon the 2005 end of Everybody Loves Raymond, Chris Hunt of The Oregonian ranked it the ninth best Raymond episode. DVD Talk praised "The Angry Family" for starting the sixth season out "with a bang," elaborating that it was "full of fun moments."

For writing "The Angry Family," Philip Rosenthal was nominated for a Primetime Emmy Award for Outstanding Writing for a Comedy Series. Jennifer Crittenden, in the same ceremony, was also nominated for the award for writing "Marie's Sculpture." This marked second and third instances Everybody Loves Raymond was nominated for the writing accolade, as Romano and Rosenthal were previously nominated in 2000 for their work on "Bad Moon Rising."

== Home media ==
On May 9, 2006, "The Angry Family," along with the rest of the sixth season of Everybody Loves Raymond, was released to DVD.

== See also ==
- Dysfunctional family
