= Baggage (Everybody Loves Raymond) =

- Everybody Loves Raymond episode
- Robert finds Raymond and Debra in the midst of their suitcase argument.
- Episode no.: Season 7 Episode 22
- Directed by: Gary Halvorson
- Written by: Tucker Cawley
- Cinematography by: Mike Berlin
- Editing by: Patricia Barnett
- Production code: 0221
- Original air date: May 5, 2003
- Running time: 22 minutes

Episode chronology
← Previous "The Shower"	Next → "The Bachelor Party"
- Everybody Loves Raymond (season 7)

"Baggage" is the twenty-second episode of the seventh season of the American television sitcom Everybody Loves Raymond. Written by Tucker Cawley and directed by Gary Halvorson, the episode aired on May 5, 2003, on CBS. The series follows the life of Newsday sportswriter Ray Barone (Ray Romano) and his family, consisting of wife Debra (Patricia Heaton), parents Frank (Peter Boyle) and Marie (Doris Roberts), brother Robert (Brad Garrett), daughter Ally (Madylin Sweeten), and twin sons Michael (Sullivan Sweeten) and Geoffrey (Sawyer Sweeten). In the episode, a battle arises between Ray and Debra's refusal to bring upstairs and unpack a suitcase they took on a Connecticut vacation, which has remained on the landing for three weeks.

Like most episodes of Everybody Loves Raymond, "Baggage" was inspired from real arguments the writers had with their spouses. Tucker based the episode off a fight he had with his wife—of which was also about a suitcase. Upon filming the episode, multiple people spoke to Tucker about their own "suitcase stories".

"Baggage" received critical acclaim upon release, mainly for its humor and writing; and, in 2024, was ranked seventy-seventh by Rolling Stone in their list of the "100 Best TV Episodes Of All Time". Also in 2024, Romano revealed that the episode was one of his favorites, giving it a personal score of 96/100. In an online poll run by CBS that allowed viewers to vote for their favorite episodes of the series, "Baggage" finished as number three. It has been the subject of critical analysis, with one discussing the episode in the context of marriage and faith.

== Plot ==
After a trip to Connecticut, Raymond and Debra are too tired to bring their suitcase upstairs and unpack it, so they leave it on the landing. Raymond expects Debra to take care of it later, but she pretends to not notice it. To draw attention to it, they each start grabbing clothes from the suitcase and wearing them around the house, but their efforts are futile. After a continuous series of petty behavior between the two, the suitcase is still left on the landing three weeks later. In the present day, Raymond is preparing for a road trip to cover the New York Mets. Just as he's about to finally unpack the suitcase for his trip, his father, Frank, tells him to leave it there to spite Debra. Frank also tells Debra the same thing, hoping to instigate an argument between them.

Raymond packs his belongings into a small plastic bag, which offends Debra. To further spite her, he sneaks a week-old moldy block of cheese into the suitcase before he leaves. The next day, Debra and Marie, Raymond's mother, notice the pungent scent of the cheese before finding it in the suitcase. Marie suggests taking the suitcase outside, but Debra refuses, determined not to let Raymond win.

Realizing the situation, Marie brings Debra to her house to explain a similar conflict she had with Frank over a large decorative fork and spoon hanging on their kitchen wall. Marie and Frank received them as a wedding gift and disliked them, but neither returned them for months, each expecting the other to do it. This led to the couple's first argument. In retaliation, Frank hung them on the wall, and Marie responded by placing the fork higher. She advises Debra to simply move the suitcase so that she doesn't have her own "fork and spoon" with Raymond.

As Debra comes home, Raymond gets back early from his trip, feeling guilty. The two briefly reconcile before another fight breaks out: a petty competition over who will carry up the suitcase. This is halted by Ray's brother, Robert, entering the house to ask if he could borrow the suitcase. At Marie and Frank's house, Marie attempts to end her battle with Frank by taking down the fork and spoon; however, their shape remains on the wall as a result of wallpaper discoloration, forcing Marie to put them back. As she storms off, Frank remarks that he does not remember receiving them.

== Production ==
Romano (left) and Cawley (right) behind the scenes of the episode.

"Baggage", produced as the 169th episode of the series, was written by Tucker Cawley and directed by Gary Halvorson. It was based on a real-life argument Tucker had with his wife about an unmoved suitcase. After a vacation, Tucker and his wife left a suitcase next to their bed; when it remained there for a long time, Tucker realized his wife expected him to move it. He decided not to, considering it a "stubborn kind of standoff that all couples have". In the writer's room, series co-creator Philip Rosenthal asked Tucker and other writers what had happened over their weekend, attempting to spark an episode concept.

Jokingly, he asked if anyone had recently fought with their wives, something he usually did. Seeing potential in the story, Tucker pitched the concept of Raymond and Debra fighting over a suitcase to Rosenthal and other writers, who were immediately "hooked". Tucker planned to eventually move it, but was encouraged not to by Rosenthal. The suitcase remained there, and was not touched until Tucker and his wife went on another vacation, when they finally "picked it up on the bed and put new clothes in it.". Tucker recounted in the book Everybody Loves Raymond: Our Family Album that, on the day of filming, multiple audience members met with him near the set's railing and told him their own "suitcase stories"; of these stories included a woman not moving a ballpoint pen because of stubbornness and a miscommunication with her husband. This, as Tucker noted, was when he "[knew that we] had something good".

== Analysis ==
"In the first half of ["Baggage"], it is quite clear that people can and do live with the results of a stalemated power over others attempt. In the last half, Debra simply decides to not fight a prolonged war and instead lets Raymond win this one. Still you can be sure that, in real life, Debra would be keeping score."

— Iris Lynch on the episode.

In her book The Miracle of Self Power, author Iris Lynch cites "Baggage" as an example of television making a "power play" humorous. Lynch compares the episode to "[making] our own choices and [keeping] our power over self"; encouraging readers to stop letting others "manipulate" their lives, much like Debra and Raymond's arguments over the suitcase. Jason Mittell highlighted how the episode distinguishes Everybody Loves Raymond from most sitcoms, as it takes an often overlooked detail—the fork and spoon seen in Marie and Frank's home—and expands on it with a backstory. It, as Mittell puts it, allows for a unique narrative development not found in other series.

In the book 9 Lies That Will Destroy Your Marriage, authors Greg Smalley and Robert Paul liken Debra and Raymond's argument to surrounding and pride, arguing that "Baggage" profoundly explores often unnecessary "tug-of-war" battles between spouses, despite the episode’s brief running time. Smalley and Paul interpret the episode within the context of Christianity, emphasizing how sacrifice, such as the brief reconciliation between Debra and Raymond, is often an integral part of marriage and faith.

== Release and reception ==
In its original broadcast on CBS on May 5, 2003, "Baggage" was the sixth highest-rated program of the week, acquiring approximately 19.59 million viewers. It was up 9.27% from the previous episode, "The Shower", which acquired approximately 17.93 million viewers.

"Baggage" has been named by critics as one of the best episodes of Everybody Loves Raymond, notably as the number-one best by Chris Hunt of The Oregonian; and sixth on a ranking by TV Guide of the 65 Best Episodes of the 21st Century. It is the fourth highest-rated episode of Everybody Loves Raymond on IMDb as of May 2023, with a rating of 8.7; and in a March 2005 online viewers poll ran by CBS of the greatest Everybody Loves Raymond episodes, "Baggage" finished as number three.

As Screen Rant summarized the episode, it is "as simple as [its] premise is, it created a lot of comedic moments. It proved that the show had strongly-written characters because even with not much to do, their solid personalities and quirks took over, causing fans to fall in love with the humor." In 2024, Ray Romano revealed he had rewatched the entire series, and had given each episode a rating from 1 to 100; doing so, he gave "Baggage" a 96, tying it with "Good Girls" and "She's the One" for his highest-rated. In 2024, Alan Sepinwall of Rolling Stone listed the episode seventy-seventh in its list of the "100 Best TV Episodes Of All Time", highlighting "Don’t let a suitcase filled with cheese be your big fork and spoon" as a "great sitcom line". Sepinwall complimented Romano and Heaton for their "physical-comedy chops" presented in the episode, noting the slapstick fight Debra and Raymond have as an example of this.

"Baggage", along with the rest of the season, was released on DVD on September 19, 2006, in The Complete Seventh Season box set. The set also included audio commentary for the episode from creators Ray Romano and Philip Rosenthal; and episode writer Tucker Cawley. All of Everybody Loves Raymond was added to Paramount+ in December 2022. The entire series was also made available on the American streaming service Peacock upon the service's launch.

=== Awards ===
Cawley won two awards for writing "Baggage": a Primetime Emmy Award for Outstanding Writing for a Comedy Series and Best Writing in a Comedy Series from the Online Film & Television Association's TV Awards. Heaton also received a Primetime Emmy Award nomination for Outstanding Lead Actress in a Comedy Series for the episode.
