= The Annoying Kid =

- Everybody Loves Raymond episode
- Brett Buford as the titular "Annoying Kid" Spencer Williamson
- Episode no.: Season 7 Episode 8
- Directed by: Jerry Zaks
- Written by: Lew Schneider
- Cinematography by: Mike Berlin
- Editing by: Patricia Barnett
- Production code: 0208
- Original air date: November 11, 2002
- Running time: 22 minutes

Guest appearances
- Cheryl Hines as Lauren Williamson; Craig Anton as Neil Williamson; Brett Buford as Spencer Williamson

Episode chronology
← Previous "The Sigh"	Next → "She's the One"
- Everybody Loves Raymond (season 7)

"The Annoying Kid" is the eighth episode of the seventh season of the American sitcom Everybody Loves Raymond (1996–2005). The series follows the life of Newsday sportswriter Ray Barone as he tries to cope with being with his neurotic family, consisting of wife Debra (Patricia Heaton), parents Frank (Peter Boyle) and Marie (Doris Roberts), brother Robert (Brad Garrett), daughter Ally (Madylin Sweeten), and twin sons Michael (Sullivan Sweeten) and Geoffrey (Sawyer Sweeten).

In "The Annoying Kid," Ray and Debra try to become friends with a couple, Lauren (Cheryl Hines) and Neil Williamson (Craig Anton), but Ray's encounters with their son Spencer (Brett Buford) test his ability to do that. The episode, directed by Jerry Zaks from a story and teleplay by Lew Schneider, originally aired on CBS on November 11, 2002. It garnered 8.2 million viewers that night, making it the fifth most-viewed television program of the week. It has been critically well-received, with Buford nominated for a Young Artist Award for his role in the episode.

== Plot ==
Ray and Debra are acquainting with Lauren and Neil Williamson, whose son Spencer is a loud and rambunctious kid. He initially gets along with Lauren and Neil, but becomes flustered with Spencer, who eats the last cannoli in the fridge that Ray originally wanted. Ray explains to Debra that he won't allow the Williamsons to come over if they bring over Spencer again. However, Debra is very committed to making a new friend and doesn't want Ray's opinion towards Spencer to ruin it; she dismisses Ray's claims as nothing more than a hatred for kids, and tells him to suck it up.

The next visit of the Williamsons, Spencer starts to bother Ray's daughter Ally. When Ray and Debra tell Ally to play on the computer and Spencer, Geoffrey and Michael to play somewhere else, Spencer announces he'll jump on the beds. Ray then tries to talk Spencer out of it, but Spencer refuses, reasoning that he, Michael, and Geoffrey are "flying spiders." Ray then makes up a bunch of facts about how spiders don't fly, which includes citing superhero comic book franchises such as Spider-Man and Superman, but Spencer doesn't fall for it. When Spencer and the other kids go upstairs, Ray finds "Ray Stinks" spelled on the refrigerator with magnetic letters, which he concludes Spencer did.

Ray then goes upstairs to Michael and Geoffrey's room, finding Spencer jumping on the bed. He says the phrase spelled on the fridge to Ray's face, and runs downstairs into the backyard. Raymond cracks and chases him; when arriving at the backyard, Spencer pretends to have a "system failure" after Ray yells his name. Debra, Lauren, and Neil then walk into the backyard, and Ray informs the three about Spencer's poor behavior. Lauren and Neil then inform Ray and Debra of Spencer being diagnosed as "gifted," which is a reason for his conduct and the couple's inability to start relationships with other people. When the family leaves, Ray and Debra also notice Spencer being unable to follow his parents' order, and they ultimately agree not to have the Williamsons back over.

At the home of Ray's parents, Frank also uses letter magnets to spell "Marie Stinks" on the fridge, which upsets his wife.

== Production ==
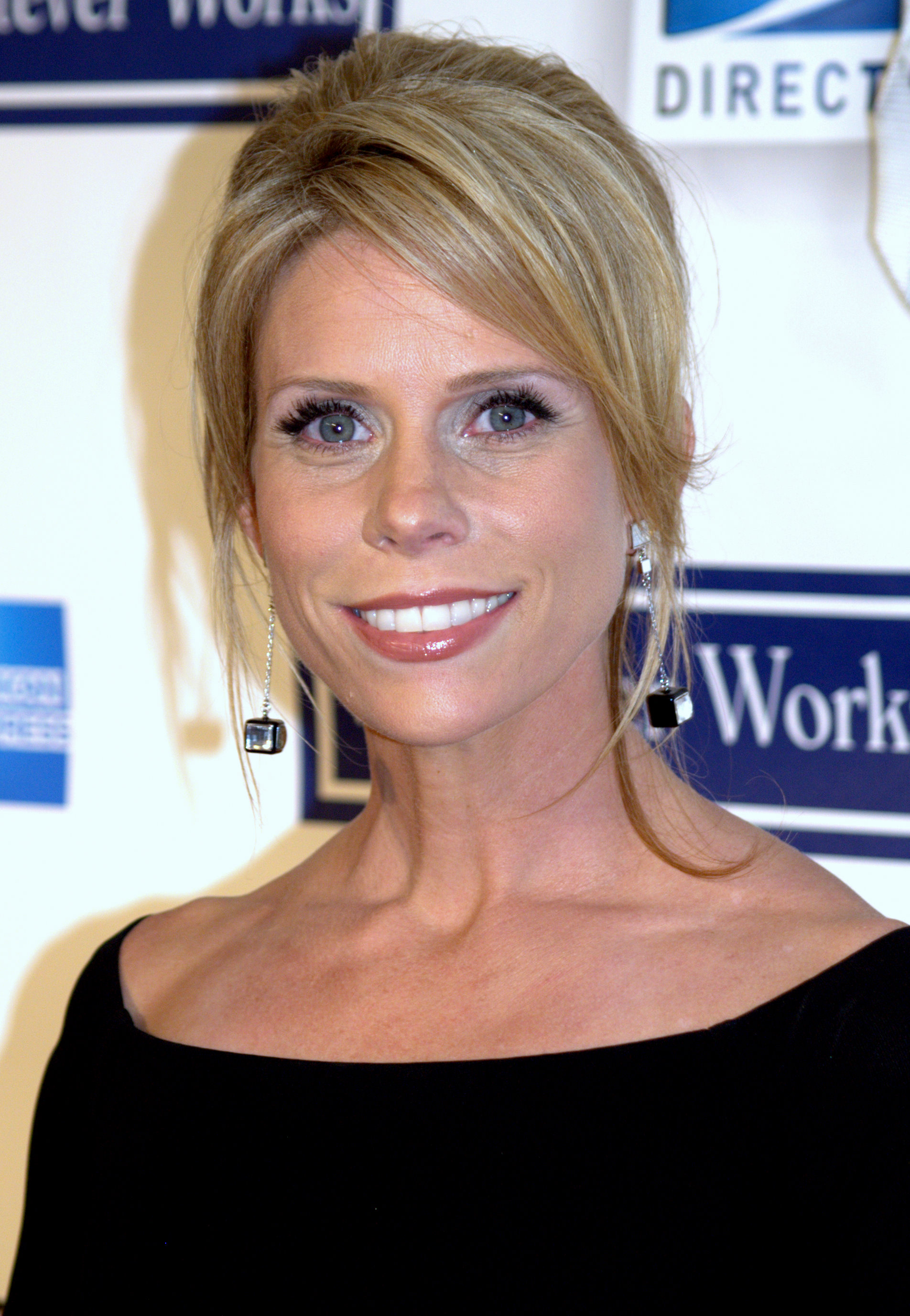
Cheryl Hines guest stars as Spencer's mom in "The Annoying Kid."

"The Annoying Kid" was written by Jerry Zaks, his second writing credit for Everybody Loves Raymond's seventh season after "The Sigh;" and directed by Lew Schneider. In addition to Brett Buford as the titular kid and Craig Anton and his father; Cheryl Hines, who was most known at the time of the episode's airing for starring in Curb Your Enthusiasm, plays the kid's mother; the episode aired during the 2002 November sweeps month, where other series also had episodes with celebrity guest stars.

== Reception ==
According to the Nielsen ratings, "The Annoying Kid" was the fifth most-viewed television program of the week of November 11 to 17, 2002; it garnered 12.9% of 106.7 million television screens, meaning around 8.2 million viewers tuned in to see the episode.

Upon its original airing, "The Annoying Kid" was featured as a "Best Bet" in a feature published in the Arkansas Democrat-Gazette. The Oregonian, in 2005, ranked "The Annoying Kid" the tenth best episode of the entirety of the series. Screen Rant, in 2019, ranked it the ninth funniest Raymond episode, stating, "The premise of a schoolyard-style grudge match between a man and someone old enough to be his son is funny enough, but the authentic performance by the child, played by Brett Buford, adds a little extra something." For acting in the episode, Buford was nominated for a Young Artist Award for Best Performance in a TV Comedy or Drama Series (Guest Starring Young Actor Age Ten or Younger).

== Home media ==
"The Annoying Kid", along with the rest of the seventh season, was released to DVD on September 19, 2006. It, along with the whole series, was also available on Netflix until September 1, 2016.
