= 54th Primetime Emmy Awards =

2002 American television programming awards

- Promotional poster
- Date: September 22, 2002 (Ceremony); September 14, 2002 (Creative Arts Awards)
- Location: Shrine Auditorium, Los Angeles, California
- Presented by: Academy of Television Arts & Sciences
- Hosted by: Conan O'Brien

Highlights
- Most awards: The West Wing (4)
- Most nominations: The West Wing (13)
- Outstanding Comedy Series: Friends
- Outstanding Drama Series: The West Wing
- Outstanding Miniseries: Band of Brothers
- Outstanding Variety, Music or Comedy Series: Late Show with David Letterman
- Website: http://www.emmys.com/

Television/radio coverage
- Network: NBC
- Produced by: Don Mischer

The 54th Primetime Emmy Awards were held on Sunday, September 22, 2002. Nominations were announced July 22, 2002. The ceremony was hosted by Conan O'Brien and was broadcast on NBC. Two networks, FX and VH1, received their first major nominations this year. The program America: A Tribute to Heroes was simulcast on every major network and, therefore, is not designated with one below. 27 competitive awards were presented.

After four nominations during its first seven seasons, Friends won Outstanding Comedy Series without a directing or a writing nomination. Everybody Loves Raymond led all comedies with nine major nominations and three major wins. Meanwhile, after eight consecutive nominations (including five consecutive wins for its first five seasons), Frasier was excluded from the Outstanding Comedy Series nomination for the first time. It would not be nominated for its final two seasons either.

For the third straight year, the drama field was conquered by The West Wing. In addition to winning its third consecutive trophy for Outstanding Drama Series, The West Wing achieved a milestone when it became the third series (all dramas) to gain nine acting nominations for its main cast members. This tied the mark set by Hill Street Blues in 1982 and later matched by L.A. Law in 1989. Game of Thrones would also match this in 2019. The West Wing also set a record with twelve total acting nominations when including the guest category, a category that existed for L.A. Law, but was not available for Hill Street Blues during its second season (1981–82) of nine acting nominations. Overall, The West Wing led all series in major nominations and wins with thirteen and four.

In addition, Stockard Channing joined an exclusive club of actors that have won two awards in one ceremony for different roles. Furthermore, Michael Chiklis became the second actor in a cable network series to win for Outstanding Lead Actor in a Drama Series (after James Gandolfini for The Sopranos in 2000 and 2001) for his performance as Vic Mackey in The Shield whilst becoming FX's first ever acting win.

When Band of Brothers won Outstanding Miniseries, the audience gave a standing ovation to the miniseries' subjects: the soldiers of "Easy" Company, 2nd Battalion, 506th Parachute Infantry Regiment of the 101st Airborne Division, as their surviving members were shown both in the auditorium and on the broadcast at the Los Angeles St. Regis Hotel. Co-creator and executive producer Steven Spielberg then invited Major Richard "Dick" Winters, their D-Day commanding officer who was played by Damian Lewis in the miniseries and attended the ceremony live, to speak.

== Winners and nominees ==
Winners are listed first and highlighted in bold:

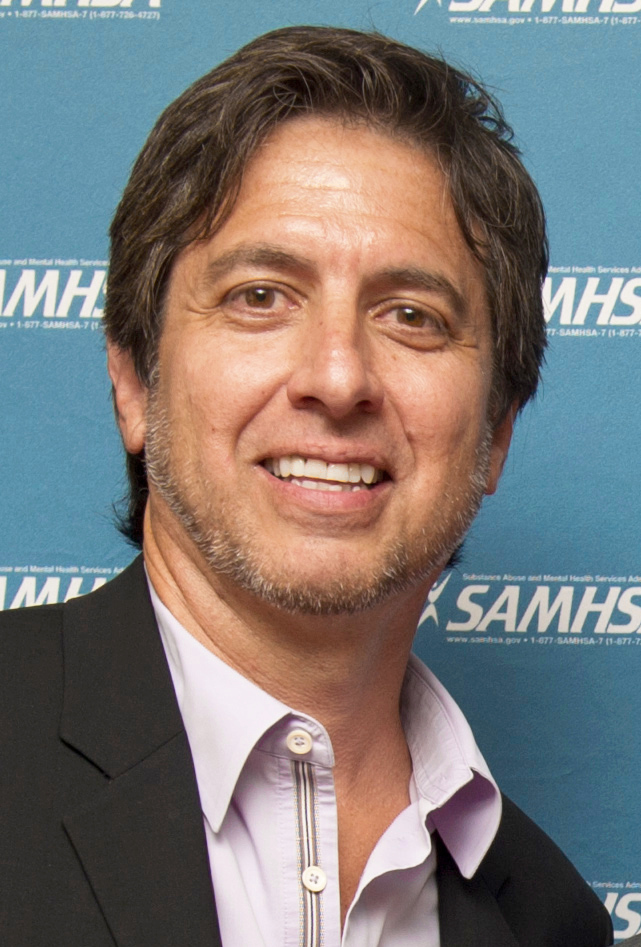
Ray Romano, Outstanding Lead Actor in a Comedy Series winner

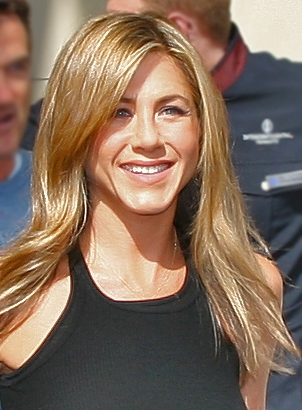
Jennifer Aniston, Outstanding Lead Actress in a Comedy Series winner

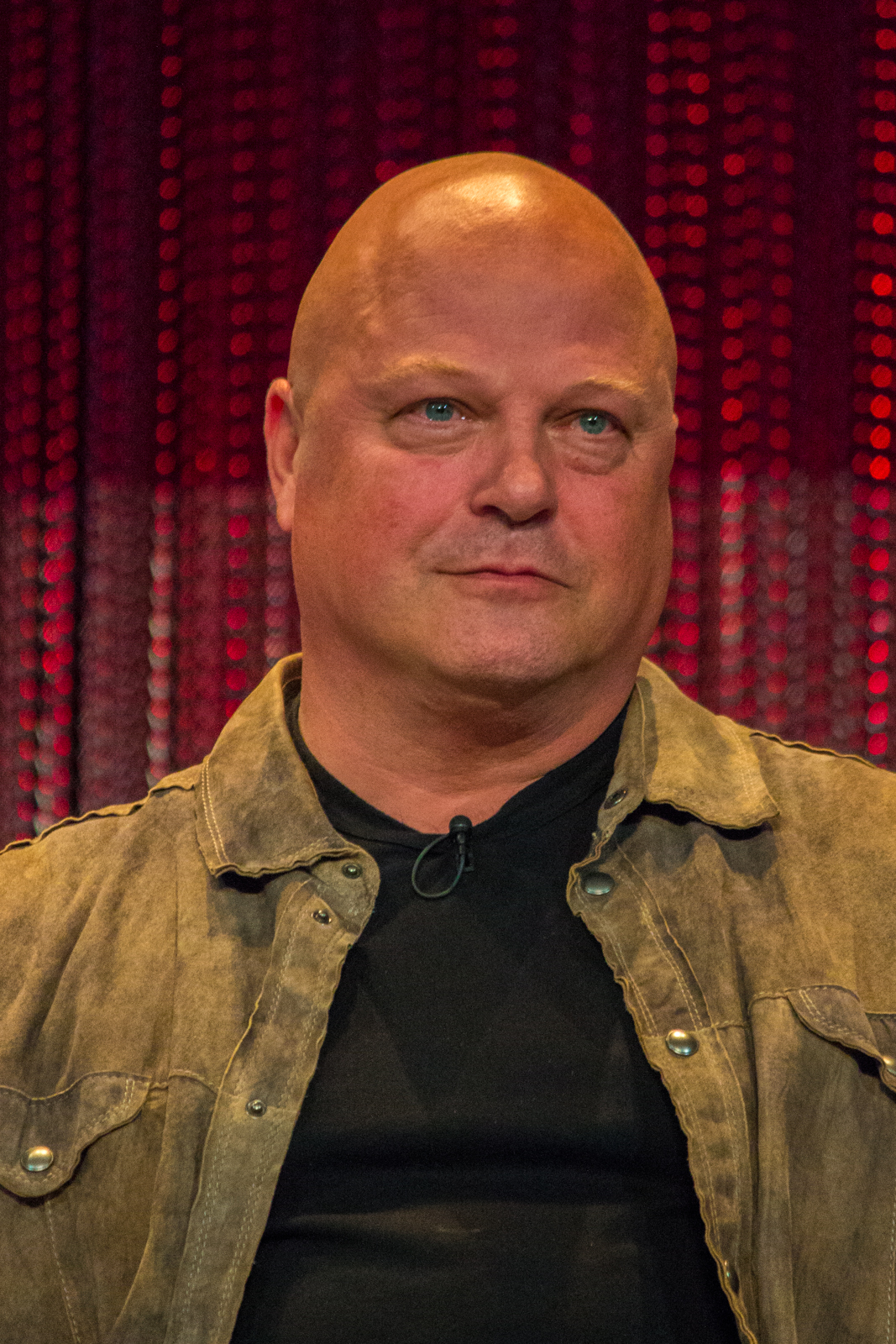
Michael Chiklis, Outstanding Lead Actor in a Drama Series winner

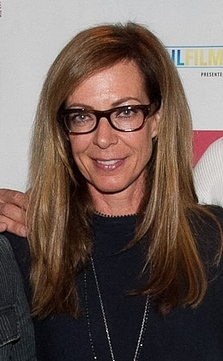
Allison Janney, Outstanding Lead Actress in a Drama Series winner

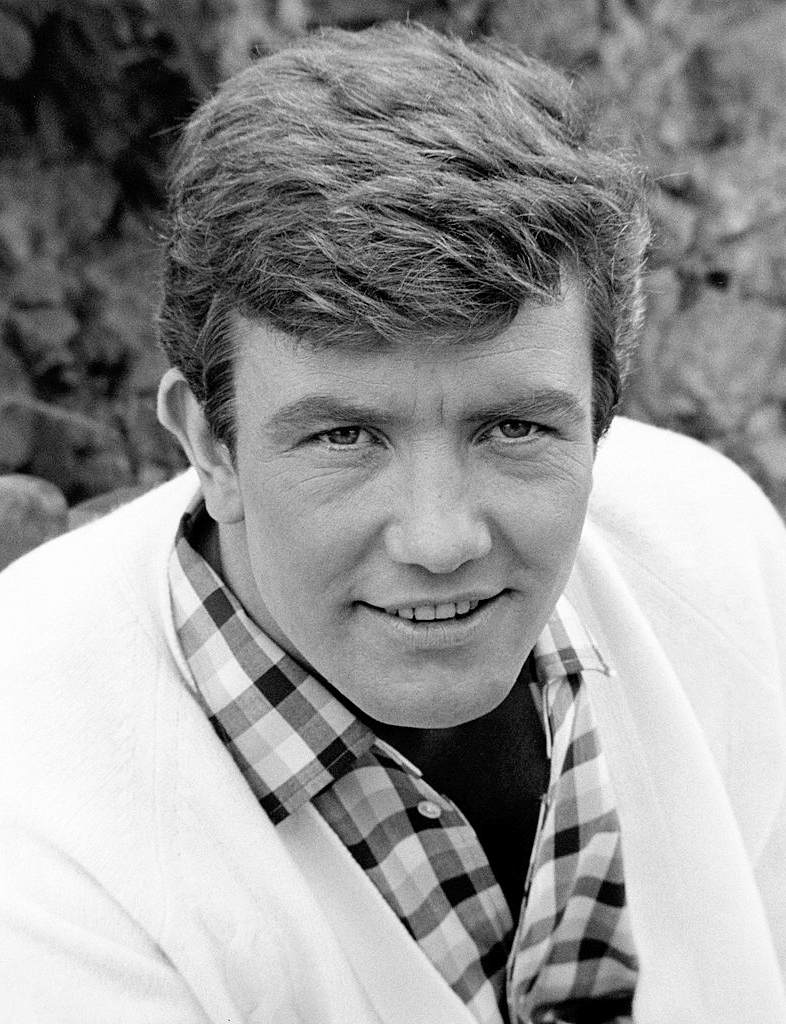
Albert Finney, Outstanding Lead Actor in a Miniseries or Movie winner

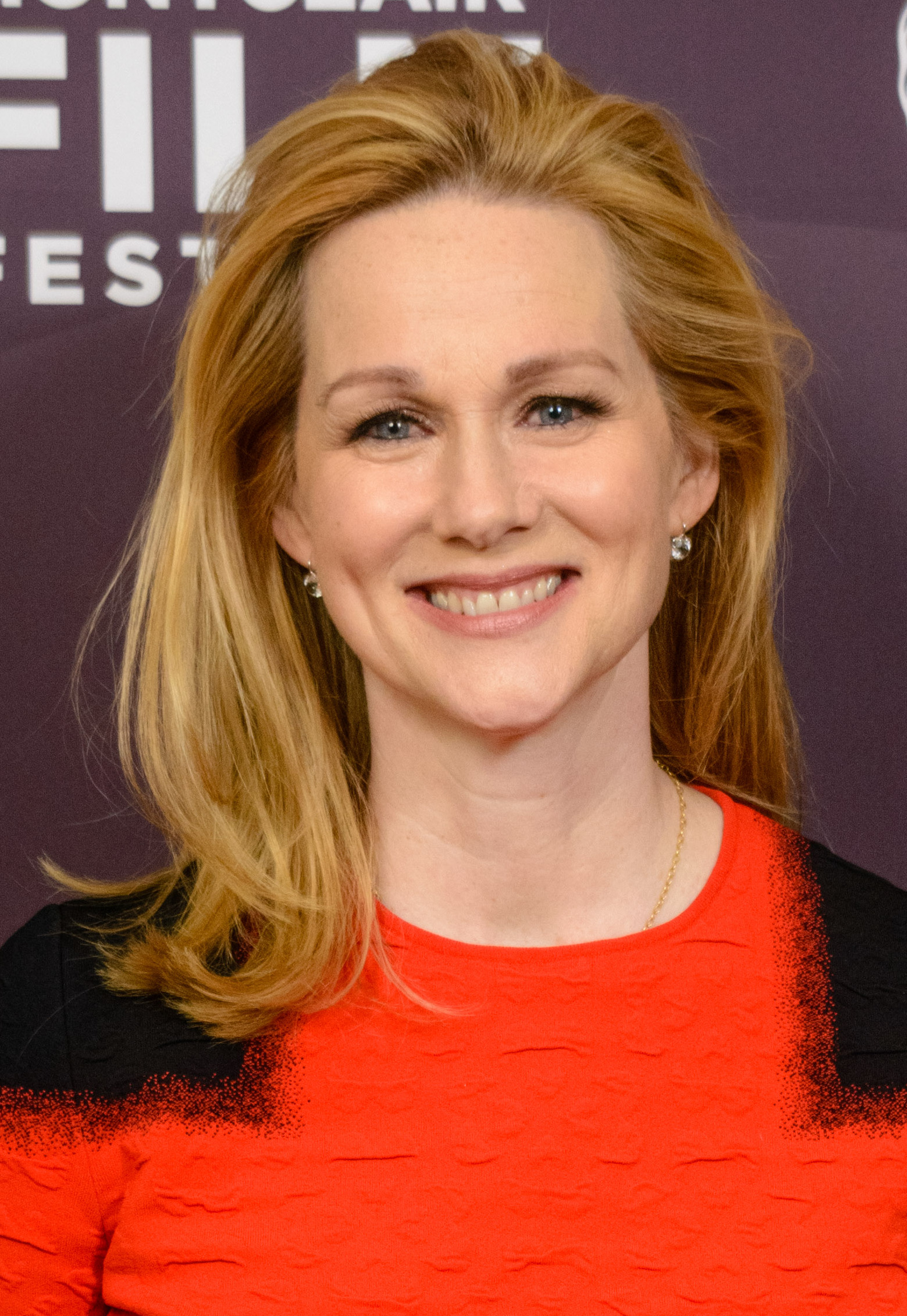
Laura Linney, Outstanding Lead Actress in a Miniseries or Movie winner

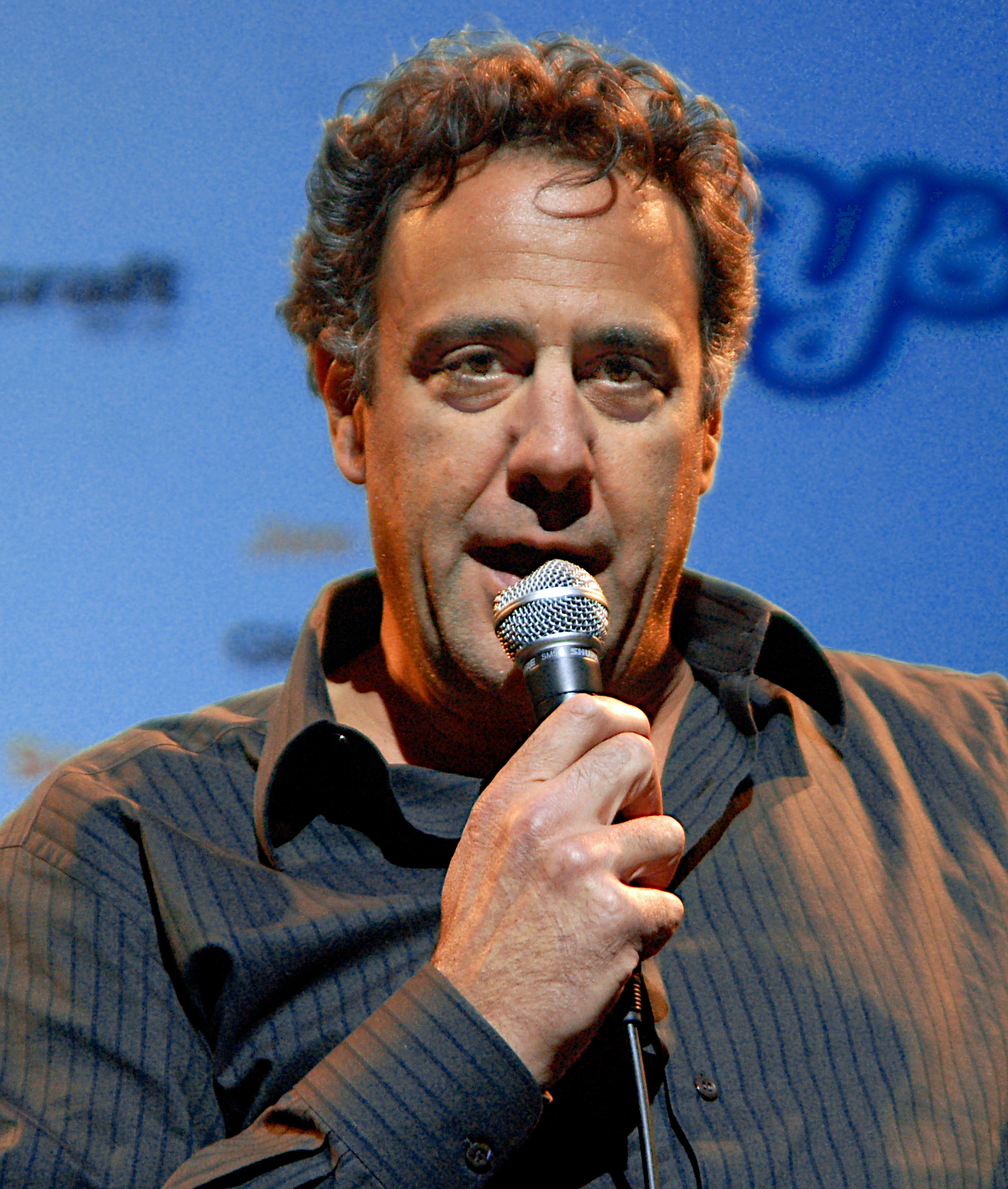
Brad Garrett, Outstanding Supporting Actor in a Comedy Series winner

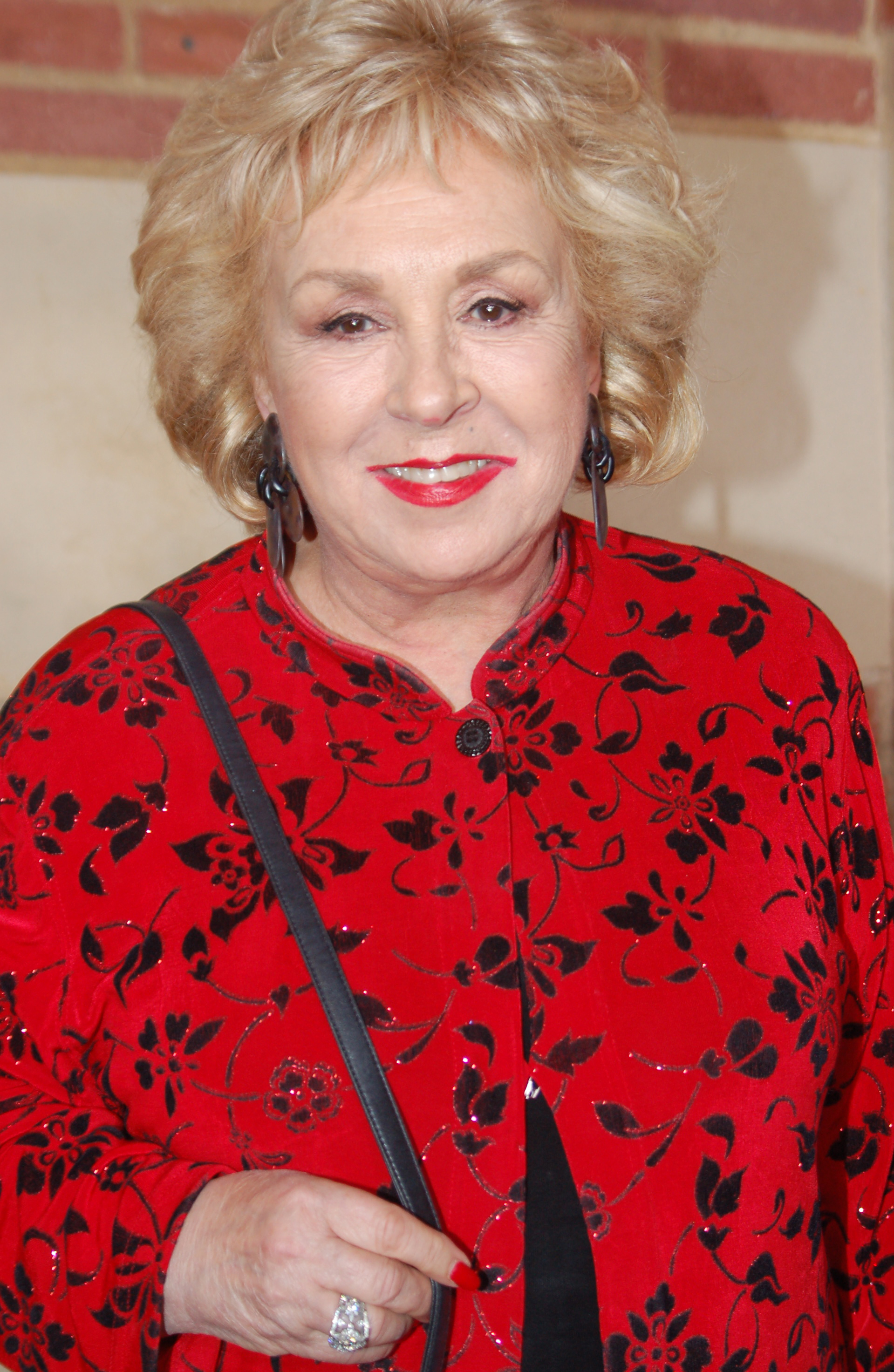
Doris Roberts, Outstanding Supporting Actress in a Comedy Series winner

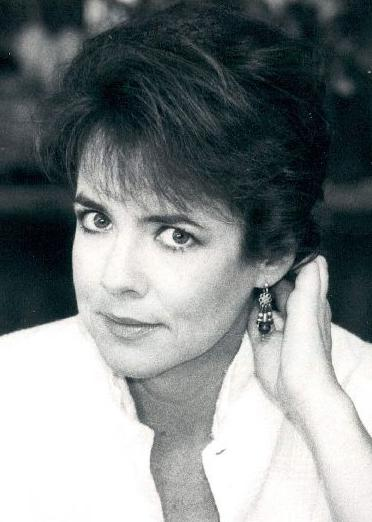
Stockard Channing, Outstanding Supporting Actress in a Drama Series and Outstanding Supporting Actress in a Miniseries or Movie winner

=== Programs ===
Programs
**Outstanding Comedy Series**: **Friends (NBC)**; Curb Your Enthusiasm (HBO); Everybody Loves Raymond (CBS); Sex and the City (HBO); Will & Grace (NBC)	**Outstanding Drama Series**: **The West Wing (NBC)**; 24 (Fox); CSI: Crime Scene Investigation (CBS); Law & Order (NBC); Six Feet Under (HBO)
**Outstanding Variety, Music or Comedy Series**: **Late Show with David Letterman (CBS)**; The Daily Show with Jon Stewart (Comedy Central); Politically Incorrect with Bill Maher (ABC); Saturday Night Live (NBC); The Tonight Show with Jay Leno (NBC)	**Outstanding Variety, Music or Comedy Special**: **America: A Tribute to Heroes**; 2002 Salt Lake Olympic Winter Games Opening Ceremony (NBC); 74th Annual Academy Awards (ABC); Carol Burnett: Show Stoppers (CBS); Cirque du Soleil: Alegria (Bravo); The Concert for New York City (VH1)
**Outstanding Made for Television Movie**: **The Gathering Storm (HBO)**; Dinner with Friends (HBO); James Dean (TNT); The Laramie Project (HBO); Path to War (HBO)	**Outstanding Miniseries**: **Band of Brothers (HBO)**; Dinotopia (ABC); The Mists of Avalon (TNT); Shackleton (A&E)

=== Acting ===
==== Lead performances ====
Lead performances
**Outstanding Lead Actor in a Comedy Series**: **Ray Romano – Everybody Loves Raymond as Ray Barone (CBS) (Episode: “The Breakup Tape”)**; Kelsey Grammer – Frasier as Dr. Frasier Crane (NBC); Matt LeBlanc – Friends as Joey Tribbiani (NBC); Bernie Mac – The Bernie Mac Show as Bernie McCullough (Fox); Matthew Perry – Friends as Chandler Bing (NBC)	**Outstanding Lead Actress in a Comedy Series**: **Jennifer Aniston – Friends as Rachel Green (NBC)**; Patricia Heaton – Everybody Loves Raymond as Debra Barone (CBS) (Episode: “A Vote For Debra”); Jane Kaczmarek – Malcolm in the Middle as Lois (Fox) (Episode: “Poker”); Debra Messing – Will & Grace as Grace Adler (NBC); Sarah Jessica Parker – Sex and the City as Carrie Bradshaw (HBO)
**Outstanding Lead Actor in a Drama Series**: **Michael Chiklis – The Shield as Vic Mackey (FX)**; Michael C. Hall – Six Feet Under as David Fisher (HBO); Peter Krause – Six Feet Under as Nate Fisher (HBO); Martin Sheen – The West Wing as President Jed Bartlet (NBC); Kiefer Sutherland – 24 as Jack Bauer (Fox)	**Outstanding Lead Actress in a Drama Series**: **Allison Janney – The West Wing as C. J. Cregg (NBC)**; Amy Brenneman – Judging Amy as Judge Amy Gray (CBS); Frances Conroy – Six Feet Under as Ruth Fisher (HBO); Jennifer Garner – Alias as Sydney Bristow (ABC); Rachel Griffiths – Six Feet Under as Brenda Chenowith (HBO)
**Outstanding Lead Actor in a Miniseries or Movie**: **Albert Finney – The Gathering Storm as Winston Churchill (HBO)**; Kenneth Branagh – Shackleton as Ernest Shackleton (A&E); Beau Bridges – We Were the Mulvaneys as Michael Mulvaney (Lifetime); James Franco – James Dean as James Dean (TNT); Michael Gambon – Path to War as President Lyndon B. Johnson (HBO)	**Outstanding Lead Actress in a Miniseries or Movie**: **Laura Linney – Wild Iris as Iris Bravard (Showtime)**; Angela Bassett – The Rosa Parks Story as Rosa Parks (CBS); Blythe Danner – We Were the Mulvaneys as Corinne Mulvaney (Lifetime); Vanessa Redgrave – The Gathering Storm as Clementine Churchill (HBO); Gena Rowlands – Wild Iris as Minnie Brinn (Showtime)

==== Supporting performances ====
Supporting performances
**Outstanding Supporting Actor in a Comedy Series**: **Brad Garrett – Everybody Loves Raymond as Robert Barone (CBS) (Episodes: “Raybert” and “Lucky Suit”)**; Peter Boyle – Everybody Loves Raymond as Frank Barone (CBS) (Episodes: “Frank Goes Downstairs” and “The Kicker”); Bryan Cranston – Malcolm in the Middle as Hal (Fox) (Episodes: “Poker” and “Monkey”); Sean Hayes – Will & Grace as Jack McFarland (NBC); David Hyde Pierce – Frasier as Dr. Niles Crane (NBC)	**Outstanding Supporting Actress in a Comedy Series**: **Doris Roberts – Everybody Loves Raymond as Marie Barone (CBS) (Episodes: "Marie's Sculpture" and “Lucky Suit”)**; Kim Cattrall – Sex and the City as Samantha Jones (HBO); Wendie Malick – Just Shoot Me! as Nina Van Horn (NBC); Megan Mullally – Will & Grace as Karen Walker (NBC); Cynthia Nixon – Sex and the City as Miranda Hobbes (HBO)
**Outstanding Supporting Actor in a Drama Series**: **John Spencer – The West Wing as Leo McGarry (NBC)**; Victor Garber – Alias as Jack Bristow (ABC); Dulé Hill – The West Wing as Charlie Young (NBC); Freddy Rodriguez – Six Feet Under as Federico Diaz (HBO); Richard Schiff – The West Wing as Toby Ziegler (NBC); Bradley Whitford – The West Wing as Josh Lyman (NBC)	**Outstanding Supporting Actress in a Drama Series**: **Stockard Channing – The West Wing as First Lady Abbey Bartlet (NBC)**; Lauren Ambrose – Six Feet Under as Claire Fisher (HBO); Tyne Daly – Judging Amy as Maxine Gray (CBS); Janel Moloney – The West Wing as Donna Moss (NBC); Mary-Louise Parker – The West Wing as Amy Gardner (NBC)
**Outstanding Supporting Actor in a Miniseries or Movie**: **Michael Moriarty – James Dean as Winton Dean (TNT)**; Alec Baldwin – Path to War as Robert McNamara (HBO); Jim Broadbent – The Gathering Storm as Desmond Morton (HBO); Don Cheadle – Things Behind the Sun as Chuck (Showtime); Jon Voight – Uprising as Jürgen Stroop (NBC)	**Outstanding Supporting Actress in a Miniseries or Movie**: **Stockard Channing – The Matthew Shepard Story as Judy Shepard (NBC)**; Joan Allen – The Mists of Avalon as Morgause (TNT); Anjelica Huston – The Mists of Avalon as Viviane (TNT); Diana Rigg – Victoria & Albert as Louise Lehzen (A&E); Sissy Spacek – Last Call as Zelda Fitzgerald (Showtime)

==== Individual performances ====
Individual performances
**Outstanding Individual Performance in a Variety or Music Program**
- **Sting – A&E in Concert: Sting in Tuscany...All This Time (A&E)**
  - Wayne Brady – Whose Line Is It Anyway? (ABC)
  - Billy Joel – Billy Joel: In His Own Words (A&E)
  - Jon Stewart – The Daily Show with Jon Stewart (Comedy Central)
  - Ryan Stiles – Whose Line Is It Anyway? (ABC)

=== Directing ===
Directing
**Outstanding Directing for a Comedy Series**: **Sex and the City: "The Real Me" – Michael Patrick King (HBO)**; Curb Your Enthusiasm: "The Doll" – Robert B. Weide (HBO); Malcolm in the Middle: "Christmas" – Jeff Melman (Fox); Scrubs: "My Old Lady" – Marc Buckland (NBC); Will & Grace: "A Chorus Lie" – James Burrows (NBC)	**Outstanding Directing for a Drama Series**: **Six Feet Under: "Pilot" – Alan Ball (HBO)**; The Shield: "Pilot" – Clark Johnson (FX); 24: "12:00 a.m. – 1:00 a.m." – Stephen Hopkins (Fox); The West Wing: "The Indians in the Lobby" – Paris Barclay (NBC); The West Wing: "Posse Comitatus" – Alex Graves (NBC)
**Outstanding Directing for a Variety, Music or Comedy Program**: **2002 Salt Lake Olympic Winter Games Opening Ceremony – Ron de Moraes, Kenny Ortega, and Bucky Gunts (NBC)**; 74th Annual Academy Awards – Louis J. Horvitz (ABC); America: A Tribute to Heroes – Joel Gallen and Beth McCarthy-Miller; Great Performances: Dance in America: "From Broadway: Fosse" – Matthew Diamond (PBS); Late Show with David Letterman: "1688" – Jerry Foley (CBS)	**Outstanding Directing for a Miniseries, Movie or Dramatic Special**: **Band of Brothers – David Frankel, Tom Hanks, David Leland, Richard Loncraine, David Nutter, Phil Alden Robinson, Mikael Salomon, and Tony To (HBO)**; The Gathering Storm – Richard Loncraine (HBO); James Dean – Mark Rydell (TNT); The Laramie Project – Moisés Kaufman (HBO); Path to War – John Frankenheimer (HBO)

=== Writing ===
Writing
**Outstanding Writing for a Comedy Series**: **The Bernie Mac Show: "Pilot" – Larry Wilmore (Fox)**; Andy Richter Controls the Universe: "Pilot" – Victor Fresco (Fox); Everybody Loves Raymond: "The Angry Family" – Philip Rosenthal (CBS); Everybody Loves Raymond: "Marie's Sculpture" – Jennifer Crittenden (CBS); Sex and the City: "My Motherboard, My Self" – Julie Rottenberg and Elisa Zuritsky (HBO)	**Outstanding Writing for a Drama Series**: **24: "12:00 a.m. – 1:00 a.m." – Joel Surnow and Robert Cochran (Fox)**; Alias: "Truth Be Told" – J. J. Abrams (ABC); ER: "On the Beach" – John Wells (NBC); The Shield: "Pilot" – Shawn Ryan (FX); The West Wing: "Posse Comitatus" – Aaron Sorkin (NBC)
**Outstanding Writing for a Variety, Music or Comedy Program**: **Saturday Night Live (NBC)**; America: A Tribute to Heroes; The Daily Show with Jon Stewart (Comedy Central); Late Night with Conan O'Brien (NBC); Late Show with David Letterman (CBS)	**Outstanding Writing for a Miniseries, Movie or Dramatic Special**: **The Gathering Storm – Story by : Larry Ramin and Hugh Whitemore** **Screenplay by : Hugh Whitemore (HBO)**; Band of Brothers – Erik Bork, E. Max Frye, Tom Hanks, Erik Jendresen, Bruce C. McKenna, John Orloff, and Graham Yost (HBO); The Laramie Project – Stephen Belber, Leigh Fondakowski, Amanda Gronich, Moisés Kaufman, Jeffrey LaHoste, John McAdams, Andy Paris, Greg Pierotti, Barbara Pitts, Kelli Simpkins, and Stephen Wangh (HBO); Path to War – Daniel Giat (HBO); Shackleton – Charles Sturridge (A&E)

== Most major nominations ==
Networks with multiple major nominations (Note: "Major" constitutes the categories listed above: Program, Acting, Directing, and Writing. Does not include the technical categories.)
Network	No. of Nominations
NBC	47
HBO	38
CBS	17
Fox	12

Programs with multiple major nominations
Program	Category	Network	No. of Nominations
The West Wing	Drama	NBC	13
Everybody Loves Raymond	Comedy	CBS	8
Six Feet Under	Drama	HBO	8
The Gathering Storm	Movie	HBO	6
Sex and the City	Comedy	HBO	6
Path to War	Movie	HBO	5
Will & Grace	Comedy	NBC	5
24	Drama	Fox	4
Friends	Comedy	NBC	4
James Dean	Movie	TNT	4
The Laramie Project	Movie	HBO	4
Alias	Drama	ABC	3
America: A Tribute to Heroes	Variety	Various	3
Band of Brothers	Miniseries	HBO	3
The Daily Show with Jon Stewart	Variety	Comedy Central	3
Late Show with David Letterman	Variety	CBS	3
Malcolm in the Middle	Comedy	Fox	3
The Mists of Avalon	Miniseries	TNT	3
Shackleton	Miniseries	A&E	3
The Shield	Drama	FX	3
2002 Winter Olympics Opening Ceremony	Variety	NBC	2
74th Annual Academy Awards	Variety	ABC	2
The Bernie Mac Show	Comedy	Fox	2
Curb Your Enthusiasm	Comedy	HBO	2
Frasier	Comedy	NBC	2
Judging Amy	Drama	CBS	2
Saturday Night Live	Variety	NBC	2
We Were the Mulvaneys	Movie	Lifetime	2
Whose Line Is It Anyway?	Variety	ABC	2
Wild Iris	Movie	Showtime	2

== Most major awards ==
Networks with multiple major awards
Network	No. of Awards
NBC	9
HBO	7
CBS	4
Fox	2

Programs with multiple major awards
Program	Category	Network	No. of Awards
The West Wing	Drama	NBC	4
Everybody Loves Raymond	Comedy	CBS	3
The Gathering Storm	Movie	HBO	3
Band of Brothers	Miniseries	HBO	2
Friends	Comedy	NBC	2

== Presenters ==
The awards were presented by the following people:

Presenter(s)	Role(s)
The cast of Friends	Presented the awards for Outstanding Supporting Actor in a Comedy Series and Outstanding Supporting Actress in a Comedy Series
Marg Helgenberger; William Petersen	Presented the award for Outstanding Supporting Actor in a Drama Series
Cloris Leachman; Anthony LaPaglia	Presented the award for Outstanding Writing for a Drama Series
Jon Stewart	Presented the award for Outstanding Directing for a Comedy Series
Maura Tierney; Noah Wyle	Presented the award for Outstanding Directing for a Drama Series
Heather Locklear; Simon Baker	Presented the award for Outstanding Supporting Actress in a Drama Series
Bernie Mac	Presented the award for Outstanding Writing for a Variety, Music or Comedy Program
Tina Fey; Jimmy Fallon	Presented the award for Outstanding Writing for a Comedy Series
The cast of The Osbournes	Presented the award for Outstanding Directing for a Variety, Music or Comedy Program
Debra Messing; Eric McCormack	Presented the award for Outstanding Individual Performance in a Variety or Music Program
Michael Chiklis; Jill Hennessy	Presented the awards for Outstanding Supporting Actor in a Miniseries or Movie and Outstanding Directing for a Miniseries, Movie or Dramatic Special
Charles S. Dutton; Patricia Clarkson	Presented the awards for Outstanding Supporting Actress in a Miniseries or Movie and Outstanding Writing for a Miniseries, Movie or Dramatic Special
Ray Romano	Presented the award for Outstanding Variety, Music or Comedy Series
Tom Hanks	Presented the Bob Hope Humanitarian Award to Oprah Winfrey
Ellen DeGeneres	Presented the award for Outstanding Variety, Music or Comedy Special
Jennifer Garner; Kiefer Sutherland	Presented the awards for Outstanding Lead Actor in a Miniseries or Movie and Outstanding Lead Actress in a Miniseries or Movie
Amy Brenneman; Jimmy Smits	Presented the award for Outstanding Made for Television Movie
Martin Sheen; Dennis Haysbert	Presented the award for Outstanding Miniseries
Garry Shandling	Presented the award for Outstanding Lead Actor in a Comedy Series
Bob Newhart; Suzanne Pleshette	Presented the award for Outstanding Lead Actress in a Comedy Series
Kelsey Grammer	Presented the award for Outstanding Lead Actress in a Drama Series
Cynthia Nixon; Kim Cattrall; Kristin Davis	Presented the award for Outstanding Lead Actor in a Drama Series
Rudy Giuliani	Presented the Governor's Award to America: A Tribute to Heroes and the award for Outstanding Drama Series
Jay Leno	Presented the award for Outstanding Comedy Series

== In Memoriam ==
- Rod Steiger
- James Gregory
- Kim Hunter
- Roy Huggins
- LaWanda Page
- Chick Hearn
- Rosemary Clooney
- Paul Tripp
- Peter Matz
- Jack Buck
- Avery Schreiber
- Dave Wilson
- Matt Robinson Jr.
- Howard K. Smith
- Dudley Moore
- Chuck Jones
- Dick Schaap
- Reginald Rose
- Pat Weaver
- Ted Demme
- Robert Urich
- Eileen Heckart
- John Frankenheimer
- Lew Wasserman
- Milton Berle
