= Marie's Sculpture =

- Everybody Loves Raymond episode
- Marie shows her abstract sculpture to her family, unaware most of the members think it looks like a vulva
- Episode no.: Season 6 Episode 5
- Directed by: Randy Suhr
- Written by: Jennifer Crittenden
- Cinematography by: Mike Berlin
- Editing by: Patricia Barnett
- Production code: 0105
- Original air date: October 22, 2001
- Running time: 22 minutes

Guest appearances
- Lauri Johnson as Sister Ann; Mary Gillis as Sister Beth

Episode chronology
← Previous "Ray's Ring"	Next → "Frank Goes Downstairs"
- Everybody Loves Raymond (season 6)

"Marie's Sculpture" is the fifth episode of the sixth season of the American sitcom Everybody Loves Raymond (1996–2005), written by Jennifer Crittenden and directed by Randy Suhr. Everybody Loves Raymond follows the life of Newsday sportswriter Ray Barone (Ray Romano) and his oddball family, which includes wife Debra (Patricia Heaton), parents Frank (Peter Boyle) and Marie (Doris Roberts), brother Robert (Brad Garrett), daughter Ally (Madylin Sweeten), and twin sons Michael (Sullivan Sweeten) and Geoffrey (Sawyer Sweeten).

In "Marie's Sculpture," Marie takes up sculpting, producing an abstract sculpture that (while not of her intentions) looks like a vagina, and as such, makes most of the family very uncomfortable. Lauri Johnson and Mary Gillis guest star as two Sisters who look at the statue for a church auction. Originally airing on CBS on October 22, 2001, "Marie's Sculpture" was the top-rated television program that night, scoring 21.21 million viewers aged 18 to 49. It has been considered by some television critics to be one of the best Raymond episodes and by TV Guide the 42nd Greatest Episode of All-Time. Crittenden received a nomination for the Primetime Emmy Award for Outstanding Writing for a Comedy Series for "Marie's Sculpture."

== Plot ==
Marie Barone is taking a sculpting class that her daughter-in-law Debra suggested to her. Marie brings an abstract sculpture she did in class to Debra's house and shows it to her, sons Raymond and Robert, and husband Frank. The family is initially impressed, until they realize that it resembles a vagina, although this doesn't occur to Marie or Frank. Debra, Ray, and Robert get nervous from standing in front of the sculpture, which is worsened by Marie stating she made it as a "gift" for Ray to keep in the house. However, it catches Frank's attention to the point where he's staring at it, although he's not sure why.

Although Debra initially instructs to keep the statue in the house to not upset his mother, that changes the next day when she starts to "see it in [her] sleep." Ray starts his plan of removing the statue by covering it up with a garbage bag, but Marie walks in the house as he does this. Ray and Debra successfully convince Marie to remove the sculpture from the living room while pretending to love it; however, she does this via a church auction where two Sisters come to the house to view it. They observe it the same way as Debra, Ray, and Robert did when they first saw it, and refuse to take it. One of the Sisters, Ann, informs Marie about the vaginal likeness; Marie initially takes offense to the interpretation, but when she takes a closer look, she suspects she's a lesbian.

Following the failed auction, Marie is initially discontent over not being able to do what she planned, that being to make something abstract instead of a piece that resembles a real-life object; however, Ray cheers her up by complimenting the sculpture, commending how she was able to produce art that "shocked" people and got the family to discuss it, which is "what real artists do." Her sculpture is presented at an exhibit and receives a positive reception, although at the same exhibit, Frank's emotion towards the sculpt turns from appreciative to horrified when a janitor tells him that it looks like a vagina.

== Production ==
"Marie's Sculpture" is the only episode of Everybody Loves Raymond to be directed by Randy Suhr, who was usually a first assistant director on the series. It is also Jennifer Crittenden's ninth writing credit for the series, after "The Will," "Robert's Rodeo," "Alone Time," "Robert's Divorce," "Meant to Be," "What Good Are You?," "Ray's Journal," and "Let's Fix Robert." When the series ended production of new episodes in 2005, Marie actress Doris Roberts took home the statue and placed it in her living room.

== Broadcast ==
"Marie's Sculpture" garnered 21.21 million viewers of the 18–49 demographic with a 7.8/18 rating; it was the top show of the night, scoring the fifth number-one episode for Everybody Loves Raymond's sixth season.

== Reception ==
Some critics have called "Marie's Sculpture" one of Everybody Loves Raymond's best episodes. It was number two in a March 2005 online viewers poll ran by CBS of top Raymond episodes, ranking just behind "Bad Moon Rising;" and as of October 2019, it is the seventh highest-rated Raymond episode on IMDb with a rating of 8.6/10. The first half of the sixth season of Everybody Loves Raymond topped lists of best fall 2001 series from the Daily Herald and the Orlando Sentinel, both of which claimed "The Angry Family" to be a highlight of the season. A week after the episode's airing, Entertainment Weekly included the line "Oh my God — I’m a lesbian!" as part of its Sound Bites feature, a compilation of best lines from recent television episodes; and in 2016, E! News and Hollywood.com highlighted the episode as Roberts' best moment in the entire series.

Summarized Screen Rant, "The moment Marie shows her masterpiece to Ray and Debra is unforgettable, and the story that follows is equally entertaining." Reviewing the episode upon its 2001 airing, Kevin McDonough claimed, "the episode unfolds in a series of subtle reaction shots and clever understatement, proving that words unsaid and things unseen can often be far more amusing than blatant vulgarity." DVDTalk claimed, "What makes this a really fun episode is how everyone reacts when they find out exactly what the sculpture resembles." Stated Di Nunzio, "The scenes in which one by one (except for Marie) they begin to associate the work with the exact part of a woman's body are some of the funniest moments in any television sitcom in history."

"Marie's Sculpture" is most known for its graphic content, and has never aired in the United Kingdom. It is an all-time favorite television episode for I'm Sorry creator Andrea Savage, who explained its importance in prime-time television history in a 2019 Variety interview: "at the time I think this was a groundbreaking thing. I felt like [Raymond] was an edgier show than its packaging. So it sort of slipped into people’s homes. It had some edgier stuff."

== Accolades ==
Crittenden was nominated for a Primetime Emmy Award for Outstanding Writing for a Comedy Series for writing "Marie's Sculpture." Philip Rosenthal, in the same ceremony, was also nominated for the award for writing "The Angry Family." This was the second time Everybody Loves Raymond was nominated for the writing accolade, as Romano and Rosenthal were previously nominated in 2000 for their work on "Bad Moon Rising." Pat Barnett was also nominated for an Eddie Award for Best Editing for a Half-hour Series for Television for her work on the episode. "Marie's Sculpture" made two TV Guide lists in the 2000s; it ranked number 62 on its list of the "Top 100 Most Unexpected Moments in TV History" in 2005 and 42 on its 2009 edition of the 100 Greatest Episodes of All-Time, the only Raymond episode on that list, with the following caption: "We don’t know art, but we know what we like: this bawdy screamer about a suggestive statue."

== Home media ==
On May 9, 2006, "Marie's Sculpture" was a included of the official DVD set for the sixth season, which also features an audio commentary track of the episode featuring Romano, Rosenthal, and Roberts. It, along with the whole series, was also available on Netflix until September 1, 2016.
