= Everybody Loves Raymond season 7 =

Everybody Loves Raymond
- Season 7
- DVD cover
- Starring: Ray Romano; Patricia Heaton; Brad Garrett; Madylin Sweeten; Doris Roberts; Peter Boyle
- No. of episodes: 25

Release
- Original network: CBS
- Original release: September 23, 2002 – May 19, 2003

Season chronology
- ← Previous; Season 6 Next → Season 8

The seventh season of Everybody Loves Raymond consisted of 25 episodes and aired on CBS from September 23, 2002, to May 19, 2003.

== Production ==
On January 22, 2001, it was revealed CBS was preparing to sign a deal with HBO Independent Productions and Worldwide Pants to renew Everybody Loves Raymond for a sixth and seventh season; creator Philip Rosenthal explained that he and star Ray Romano planned for the seventh to be the show's last, as he "never saw a show get better after seven years."

== Cast ==
=== Main ===
- Ray Romano as Raymond "Ray" Barone
- Patricia Heaton as Debra (née Whelan) Barone
- Brad Garrett as Robert Barone
- Doris Roberts as Marie Barone
- Peter Boyle as Francis "Frank" Barone
- Madylin Sweeten as Alexandra "Ally" Barone
- Sawyer Sweeten and Sullivan Sweeten as Geoffrey Barone and Michael Barone

=== Supporting ===
- Monica Horan as Amy McDougall-Barone
- Georgia Engel as Pat MacDougall
- Fred Willard as Hank MacDougall
- Chris Elliott as Peter MacDougall
- Andy Kindler as Andy
- Jon Manfrellotti as Gianni
- Sherri Shepherd as Judy
- Tom McGowan as Bernie Gruenfelder
- Maggie Wheeler as Linda Gruenfelder
- Victor Raider-Wexler as Stan
- Len Lesser as Garvin
- Fred Stoller as Gerard
- Amy Aquino as Peggy
- Alexandra Romano as Molly
- Albert Romano as Albert
- Max Rosenthal as Max
- Renata Scott as Harriet Lichtman

== Episodes ==
No. overall	No. in season	Title	Directed by	Written by	Original release date	Prod. code	U.S. viewers (millions)
147	1	"The Cult"	Kenneth Shapiro	Philip Rosenthal & Tucker Cawley	September 23, 2002	0201	23.27
Robert joins a strange self-help group to escape the tension coming from Marie and Debra's feud, but realizes that they are just using him to gain fame by way of his brother, Raymond. When Ray realizes that they can use this to bring Debra and Marie together, they stage a fake intervention for Robert, and with the help of Frank and Judy, they bring Marie and Debra together.
148	2	"Counseling"	Kenneth Shapiro	Mike Royce	September 23, 2002	0202	24.04
Bernie and Linda come over for dinner and during the meal they mention that they have been fighting a lot and recently started counseling. Ray and Debra realize that they have also been fighting and go to the therapist – against Ray's firm protests. Ray puts on a false front for her and Debra gets mad. Marie then decides to help and while talking Ray blurts out that he wants Debra to be like his mother.
149	3	"Homework"	Gary Halvorson	Jeremy Stevens	September 30, 2002	0203	21.96
Ray thinks Ally gets too much homework and complains to her teacher. She asks him to bring it up at the board meeting to review the syllabus. He keeps avoiding the work and Marie ends up filling in the evaluation forms. Ray then talks to the school board, but his bad grammar leads to them increasing the English homework. And even homework for Ray himself.
150	4	"Pet the Bunny"	John Fortenberry	Aaron Shure	October 7, 2002	0204	19.87
Robert and Debra accidentally discover that Ray has written a eulogy for Frank. In it he mentions that he once saw Frank petting the bunny Ray had as a kid. The word spreads around and the lodge buddies make fun of Frank. He gets annoyed with Ray because this incident has spoiled his tough-guy image, which offends Ray. In a sub-plot, Marie asks Ray to write her eulogy too.
151	5	"Who Am I?"	John Fortenberry	David Regal	October 14, 2002	0205	20.74
When Ray finds spending time with his friends boring, he starts to question his life. Debra is overjoyed that he is finally "growing up" and takes him to a lecture, where he falls asleep. Finally Frank takes him to his lodge steam room and Ray enjoys it. He then starts to behave like an old man. To revive his youth Debra kisses him passionately. Note: Ray Romano and Phil Rosenthal's fathers make an appearance in this episode as Frank's lodge buddies.
152	6	"Robert Needs Money"	Michael Zinberg	Tom Caltabiano	October 21, 2002	0206	21.54
Debra forces Ray to give Robert a thousand dollars due to his complaints of poverty. When he uses the money for a vacation in Las Vegas, Ray gets angry and says that he is not his brother anymore. Robert gets offended that Ray's gift "came with rules attached". Ray then goes over to Robert's place to work it all out.
153	7	"The Sigh"	Jerry Zaks	Steve Skrovan	November 4, 2002	0207	20.41
Ray and Debra are trying to use the bathroom sink at the same time, and Ray accidentally spits on her while brushing his teeth. Debra sighs, and it's loaded with meaning. To make her happy, he gives up the bathroom and uses the kid's bathroom. Debra re-decorates her whole bathroom. When Frank and Robert tease Ray, he says that he is still the king in the basement. When Debra starts using the basement, he complains. Debra gives back his bathroom. They have a huge fight and start spraying water on each other.
154	8	"The Annoying Kid"	Jerry Zaks	Lew Schneider	November 11, 2002	0208	20.76
Debra and Ray have some new friends over for dinner. They love the couple and the twins love their son, but Ray dislikes the son because he is annoying and keeps targeting Ray. Debra does not want to offend her new friends and asks Ray to put up with the boy. But when the couple casually mention that their son, Spencer, is better than the twins, Debra decides to not allow them to visit the house anymore, much to Ray's satisfaction.
155	9	"She's the One"	John Fortenberry	Ray Romano & Philip Rosenthal	November 18, 2002	0209	20.44
Robert thinks he has found his dream girl, until Ray witnesses her appetite....for flies. Robert doesn't believe that Ray saw her eat a fly – until he goes to her apartment, which is filled with frogs. He is shocked by her and escapes through the window. After confiding to his family what has happened about his relationship ending and admitting that Ray was right about her, he decides to give up dating and goes to a bar, where he accidentally spills the drink on a girl – who turns out to be Amy.
156	10	"Marie's Vision"	Sheldon Epps	Jay Kogen	November 25, 2002	0210	20.53
After getting glasses to correct her vision, Marie is able to notice the little flaws in everything, including the family's appearances, which leads to everyone becoming self-conscious of themselves and changing to make her stop criticizing. Raymond dyes his hair with shoe polish, Debra goes overboard with eye-liner and Robert gets Botox injections. Frank is the only one who doesn't listen to her suggestions. When Marie realizes the truth she apologizes for her comments, but tells Frank that they have a loveless marriage. An upset Frank breaks the new glasses in front of her. She later apologizes to him too.
157	11	"The Thought That Counts"	Gary Halvorson	Tucker Cawley	December 9, 2002	0211	19.09
When Ray puts a lot of thought into his mom's birthday gift, Debra asks for a thoughtful gift too. When Ray can't figure out what to get, Robert gives him the perfect idea. He gives her the first edition of To Kill a Mockingbird, the book on which she did her thesis. She is very happy and Robert is jealous because Ray did not give him his due credit. Robert obsesses over it and tells Debra the truth. Amy then confronts him on the gift he got her (tickets to the Ice Capades), which was Marie's idea. The girls are furious with the boys up until Marie stops by to pick up items anyone wants to return for "not being right", and Debra decides on keeping the book. Robert and Ray go to the Ice Capades anyway.
158	12	"Grandpa Steals"	Jerry Zaks	Lew Schneider	January 6, 2003	0213	19.71
Ally sees Frank "sample" some food at the store. When he gets caught, he argues with a worker (Jeff Garlin). Ally then gets scared and refuses to talk to him. He then has a one-on-one conversation with her to sort out the issue. On Ally's suggestion, Frank goes back to the store to apologize.
159	13	"Somebody Hates Raymond"	Jerry Zaks	Steve Skrovan	January 27, 2003	0214	17.20
Andy starts working for a DJ, Jerry Musso, who hates Ray. Ray obsesses over it, and to find out the reason Musso hates him, Ray goes to a party to meet him. Robert is happy to hear about it and follows him to the party to meet Jerry, but when Jerry insults Ray, Robert stands up for him.
160	14	"Just a Formality"	Gary Halvorson	Philip Rosenthal & Steve Skrovan	February 3, 2003	0212	20.35
Robert decides to propose to Amy and decides to ask Amy's parents for her hand in marriage. They refuse. He also discovers that Amy's brother Peter especially hates him. Even after this, he proposes to Amy and she agrees to marry him. For Amy, he goes to her parents’ house again, this time with Ray, to talk to them again. He does not succeed. When Amy learns about this, she tells Robert that she does not care what her parents think, and she still wants to marry him. Note: Ray Romano's brother makes an appearance in this episode as one of the officers who "arrest" Amy.
161	15	"The Disciplinarian"	Jerry Zaks	Mike Royce	February 10, 2003	0215	18.05
Debra is the only one who is disciplining the kids and Ray is too lenient. Debra asks Ray to take some responsibility and be a bit firm. Ray tries to get the twins to clean up the room and goes overboard with the punishment when they don't listen to him. The adults have a discussion on ways to discipline children and all learn a lesson after a few revelations.
162	16	"Sweet Charity"	Jerry Zaks	Mike Royce & Lew Schneider	February 17, 2003	0216	17.46
For church charity, Debra signs Ray up to work at the hospital and she volunteers to work with the homeless. Initially Ray is apprehensive, but he starts to love the work. He becomes too popular and Debra gets a bit jealous. She plots a terrible plan to end Ray's popularity and to get her back in charge of the hospital.
163	17	"Meeting the Parents"	Jerry Zaks	Aaron Shure	February 24, 2003	0217	22.20
Amy's straight-laced mom and dad finally meet the Barone family, when they show up unexpectedly as Robert is emerging from the shower, and insult Frank and Marie for lacking Christian values. Debra tries to help smooth things over and fails. When Amy realizes that her parents want to take her back home, she locks herself up in a room. Finally, Ray sends them out to let them escape from the family.
164	18	"The Plan"	Jerry Zaks	Tucker Cawley	March 10, 2003	0218	19.48
Following Raymond and Frank's advice, Robert purposefully botches the wedding invitations in hopes of getting Amy to do all the preparations on her own. The wrong invitations are sent to people by accident and Amy finds out about the whole plan. The women confront the men and the subject of "faking" inabilities raises questions on both sides.
165	19	"Sleepover at Peggy's"	Gary Halvorson	Joe Rubin & George B. White III	March 31, 2003	0219	18.65
Debra is sick so Ray has to drop Ally off at the home of his arch-enemy, Peggy. He helps her assemble a tent for the kids, and when Peggy pats his behind in appreciation, he starts to believe that Peggy likes him. He escapes her house as quickly as he can but when Ally wants to return home, Ray is forced to go back. There he talks to Peggy and she clears up the issue. Note: This is the final of four episodes in the series in which Peter Boyle (Frank Barone) does not appear; the other three are in season 3.
166	20	"Who's Next?"	Gary Halvorson	Story by : Miriam Trogdon; Teleplay by : Steve Skrovan	April 14, 2003	0220	17.72
When Marie's friend, Mrs. Caputo dies, Marie reveals that she had chosen Mrs. Caputo to be Frank's wife after her death. Frank says that he wants Harriet Lichmann instead. The idea of selecting an after-death mate confuses Debra, but later she chooses Linda Gruenfelder for Ray, which gets Ray to start fantasizing about Linda. Ray chooses Bernie Gruenfelder for Debra, but this disgusts her and she gets upset because he isn't putting any thought into it (she doesn't like the idea because Bernie is not conventionally attractive). Debra cancels dinner plans with Bernie and Linda the next day, lying because she has become jealous. Later, the Barones, Amy, Harriet Lichmann and the Gruenfelders all meet at Mrs. Caputo's funeral, and conflict ensues, with Frank yelling "I wouldn't be caught dead next to Rose Caputo!", causing them to leave in humiliation.
167	21	"The Shower"	Jerry Zaks	Leslie Caveny	April 28, 2003	0223	17.93
Debra gives a bridal shower for Amy but as usual Marie interferes. Annoyed, Debra drinks too much champagne. She is unable to drive, so she calls Ray and then naps in the car. A policeman (Billy Mayo) finds her in the car and she gets arrested for DUI. Ray bails her out. Marie thinks that Debra has a drinking problem and overreacts. Debra's license is suspended and she gets stuck with Marie driving her around. During the hearing, Marie interferes again but this time it actually helps her get Debra's license back.
168	22	"Baggage"	Gary Halvorson	Tucker Cawley	May 5, 2003	0221	19.59
Ray and Debra go out for a weekend and, when they return, leave a suitcase on the stairs landing temporarily. Weeks pass, but they both behave passive-aggressively and ignore the luggage. Finally, to take the final revenge, Ray puts smelly cheese inside it, just before his road trip, to make Debra move it. Debra just removes the cheese and leaves the luggage. Marie then tells Debra the story of the ugly fork and spoon hanging in her kitchen. Finally Debra and Ray both want to take the luggage and end up fighting over that.
169	23	"The Bachelor Party"	Gary Halvorson	Tom Caltabiano & Ray Romano & Mike Royce	May 12, 2003	0222	18.71
Ray gives Robert a very low key bachelor party. When the women find out about it, they force him to do a better job. He then uses Frank's lodge to give him a surprise party. At the party, the banners are wrong, there is no alcohol and Gerard provides the music. In spite of all this, Robert is overjoyed and enjoys the party. Hank and Peter attend the party. Peter then reveals that the women forced Ray to give this second party. Robert, though initially hurt, doesn't mind as Ray did something good for him.
170	24	"Robert's Wedding"	Jerry Zaks	Philip Rosenthal	May 19, 2003	0224	22.68
171	25	"Robert's Wedding"	Jerry Zaks	Philip Rosenthal	May 19, 2003	0224	22.68
Robert and Amy are finally getting married. The Barones drive down to Pennsylvania for the wedding. At the wedding hall, Robert hides in the bathroom, nervous. The priest is missing, and Ray thinks that it's all Peter's fault. Frank is upset that the bar is not an open bar. Finally, everything falls into place and Robert and Amy finally make it to the altar. Just before the "I Do's", Marie interrupts with an objection, to everyone's chagrin. She cites her fear of Robert marrying from pressure and doubt about Amy's family accepting him, while Robert lambasts Marie's pattern of untimely intrusion on his events. Finally, Robert and Amy get married. At the reception, Frank and Hank squabble about the bar pricing, and Pat gently suggests to Marie that she acted from narcissism. Ray gives a Best Man speech, urging everyone to "edit" what they want to remember about their families, restoring good spirits. Robert and Amy happily perform a dance routine to Elvis Presley's "A Little Less Conversation".
