= Everybody Loves Raymond season 6 =

Everybody Loves Raymond
- Season 6
- DVD cover
- Starring: Ray Romano; Patricia Heaton; Brad Garrett; Madylin Sweeten; Doris Roberts; Peter Boyle
- No. of episodes: 24

Release
- Original network: CBS
- Original release: September 24, 2001 – May 20, 2002

Season chronology
- ← Previous; Season 5 Next → Season 7

This is a list of episodes for the sixth season of Everybody Loves Raymond. The season consisted of 24 episodes and aired on CBS from September 24, 2001, to May 20, 2002.

== Production ==
On January 22, 2001, it was revealed CBS was about to sign with HBO Independent Productions and Worldwide Pants to renew Everybody Loves Raymond for two more seasons; creator Philip Rosenthal explained that he and star Ray Romano also planned for the seventh season to be the show's last, as "I never saw a show get better after seven years." Starting the sixth season, Heaton was paid $250,000 per episode. During the promotion for Season 6 Premier the cast were scheduled to appear on CBS' The Early Show and The Rosie O'Donnell Show on September 11, 2001; due to the terrorist attacks, the latter was cancelled, and the cast remained at their hotel in New York. Romano later stated that in the afternoon the cast went for a walk in Central Park and met someone who had been at the World Trade Center and was unable to get home so they decided to take them back to the hotel gave them a room and invited them to dine with them that evening.

== Cast ==
=== Main ===
- Ray Romano as Raymond "Ray" Barone
- Patricia Heaton as Debra (née Whelan) Barone
- Brad Garrett as Robert Barone
- Doris Roberts as Marie Barone
- Peter Boyle as Francis "Frank" Barone
- Madylin Sweeten as Alexandra "Ally" Barone
- Sawyer Sweeten and Sullivan Sweeten as Geoffrey Barone and Michael Barone

=== Supporting ===
- Monica Horan as Amy McDougall
- Andy Kindler as Andy
- Jon Manfrellotti as Gianni
- Tom McGowan as Bernie Gruenfelder
- Alex Meneses as Stefania Fogagnolo
- David Proval as Marco Fogagnolo
- Katherine Helmond as Lois Whelan
- Robert Culp as Warren Whelan
- Charles Durning as Father Hubley
- Victor Raider-Wexler as Stan
- Len Lesser as Garvin
- Fred Stoller as Gerard
- Amy Aquino as Peggy
- Alexandra Romano as Molly
- Max Rosenthal as Max
- Debra Mooney as Lee
- David Hunt as Bill Parker
- Elizabeth Anne Smith as Eileen

== Ratings ==
In the sixth season, Everybody Loves Raymond increased its average viewers from 21 million in 2000 to 22 million, performing better than usual in viewership; according to network executives and Rosenthal, this was the result of the September 11 attacks, as families wanted to be comforted by seeing familiar characters in shows devoid of current event themes.

== Reviews ==
Everybody Loves Raymond topped lists of best fall 2001 series from the Daily Herald and the Orlando Sentinel. The Daily Herald claimed that "every episode has been daring, bold and, above all, hilarious," and the Sentinel stated that "no series had more winning episodes this fall." "The Angry Family" and "Marie's Sculpture" were highlighted in both lists, with "Older Women" highlighted in Sentinel's and "Raybert" praised by the Herald as a new take on a "stale" sitcom setup.

== Episodes ==
| No. overall | No. in season | Title | Directed by | Written by | Original release date | Prod. code | U.S. viewers (millions) |
|---|---|---|---|---|---|---|---|
| 123 | 1 | "The Angry Family" | Gary Halvorson | Philip Rosenthal | September 24, 2001 | 0101 | 22.80 |
Michael writes a story for class titled "The Angry Family" which includes many family members who fight and yell at each other. Concerned about Michael's family life, his teacher and Father Hubley have a conference with all the Barones, all of whom blame each other for the disharmony. Ray Romano's real-life wife Anna appears in the background at Geoffrey and Michael's school.
| 124 | 2 | "No Roll" | Jerry Zaks | Aaron Shure | October 1, 2001 | 0102 | 22.46 |
When Debra seems uninterested in sex, Ray tries to spice up things by getting a board game called "Sensualopolly", a very intimate game. His parents and Robert catch him. They make fun of him, but eventually Debra agrees to play with him at the evening. While playing she brings up some issues that Ray is not able to cope with.
| 125 | 3 | "Odd Man Out" | Jerry Zaks | Steve Skrovan & Jeremy Stevens | October 8, 2001 | 0103 | 21.44 |
Frank becomes jealous when Marco spends a lot of time learning piano with Marie and not in the lodge with him. They start to argue and then later decide to let Marco decide who his friend is. Ray is not very supportive of Marie having a male friend, which angers Debra. During Marie's birthday party, Marco decides to be Frank's friend. Frank then offers Marco to Marie, and Marie refuses. They wind up arguing over who is to be "stuck" with Marco.
| 126 | 4 | "Ray's Ring" | Kenneth Shapiro | Mike Royce | October 15, 2001 | 0104 | 21.63 |
In a motel during a road trip with Robert, Ray takes off his wedding ring because he likes to spin it. When Robert tries spinning it, it falls into a vent. Now ringless and seemingly available, Ray is hit on by a girl at the airport. Debra becomes jealous of this. She takes off her own ring and goes out shopping to make a point, but all does not go as planned, and she is offended that Ray is more hit on by girls than she is by men.
| 127 | 5 | "Marie's Sculpture" | Randy Suhr | Jennifer Crittenden | October 22, 2001 | 0105 | 21.21 |
Marie tries to find a new hobby, eventually finding joy in sculpting. When Marie shows the family an abstract sculpture she has made, everyone is shocked by the sculpture, resembling a vulva, but they pretend that they are overjoyed by it. Marie is oblivious to this, and seeing how much Ray "likes" it, she gives it to him. When Ray and Debra try to hide it, Marie is offended and decides to donate it to the church auction. The nuns who come to pick it up make Marie realize what the sculpture resembles. Notes: In 2005, TV Land included this episode as part of its "100 Most Unexpected Moments in TV History", ranking it #62. Because of the series timeslot and the content of the episode, it's not repeated in an early morning timeslot on Channel 4 in the UK. In 2009, TV Guide ranked this episode #42 on its list of the 100 Greatest Episodes.
| 128 | 6 | "Frank Goes Downstairs" | Gary Halvorson | Jennifer Crittenden | October 29, 2001 | 0107 | 20.66 |
Ray and Debra are hurt during rough sex play and Ray brags about it to his friends. When Robert talks about it in front of Frank, Ray lies to him that they fell down the stairs. Frank tries to fix the stairs and falls through to the basement, injuring him and placing him to the hospital. Ray feels guilty and tells him the truth while he is in the hospital.
| 129 | 7 | "Jealous Robert" | Gary Halvorson | Tom Caltabiano & Ray Romano | November 5, 2001 | 0106 | 21.72 |
Marie and Debra set up Amy with Gianni to get Robert jealous so he'll want to get back together with Amy. But their plan backfires when Amy starts dating Gianni and eventually falls in love with him. When Robert decides to get back with Amy, due to his jealous feelings, Ray tells him the truth, which angers Robert.
| 130 | 8 | "It's Supposed to Be Fun" | Gary Halvorson | Lew Schneider | November 12, 2001 | 0108 | 21.99 |
Ray pushes Geoffrey a bit too much at a basketball match, which is supposed to be just fun. Other parents complain about his attitude and when Geoffrey decides to quit because of Ray's comments, Ray decides to change. In the next match he goes overboard with the support, annoying everybody.
| 131 | 9 | "Older Women" | Gary Halvorson | Tucker Cawley & Philip Rosenthal | November 19, 2001 | 0109 | 21.88 |
Debra's father brings an older woman to Thanksgiving dinner. When Ray says that "He only wanted someone different", it upsets Lois and makes Debra and Marie mad. They leave and Warren explains that an older woman makes him feel young and vibrant. Later Ray apologizes to Lois and calls her "Mom", making Debra happy and Marie insulted.
| 132 | 10 | "Raybert" | Gary Halvorson | Steve Skrovan | November 26, 2001 | 0110 | 24.26 |
Robert pretends to be Ray in order to hook up with a girl, Natasha. When he mentions this to Ray, he gets all excited and they call their combo Raybert. They even try it on a girl at the laundromat. Robert later introduces Ray as Robert. When Natasha visits Ray's house to donate clothes for the police drive, thinking he is Robert, confusion arises and everything comes out in the open, causing her to break up with Robert.
| 133 | 11 | "The Kicker" | Gary Halvorson | Aaron Shure | December 10, 2001 | 0111 | 19.30 |
While enjoying a college football game, Frank catches a football from a record-setting field goal and refuses to give it back to the kicker. When word of this gets back to the local sports community via a talk radio show, he becomes a wanted man among sports fans, even admitting that he is Ray's father (humiliating him in front of the community). The rest of the family devise a way to get the football away from Frank and back to its rightful owner, but Frank might be too crafty for them.
| 134 | 12 | "Season's Greetings" | Jerry Zaks | Tucker Cawley | December 17, 2001 | 0112 | 22.20 |
When Marie writes a Christmas letter that shows Debra in a bad light, Debra blows her top and demands that Marie not send it. Marie says she has to send it because of the letter she received from her sister Theresa. Debra reads Theresa's letter and agrees that Theresa needs a smackdown, but suggests they write a new one together. When Ray, Robert and Frank read the letter they come up with, they have their own objections. In the end, each of them tear away the pieces of the letter which talk about them and walk away.
| 135 | 13 | "Tissues" | Jerry Zaks | Mike Royce | January 7, 2002 | 0113 | 22.28 |
Ray objects to calling an exterminator to kill the ants in the kitchen. Debra decides that, because of the mess and in spite of Ray's objections, they are going to take the kids and go out to dinner, an event which turns out to be a disaster. Ray tells Debra that she ignores his suggestions and rejects his plans, that he constantly has to shut his mouth to keep the peace, and that she always gets her way in every decision. She replies that when she lets him make decisions he screws them up. After the fight Debra relents and decides to let him make some decisions. Later Ray goes grocery shopping and buys an organic spray to kill the ants and 10 boxes of tissues which everyone hates. When Debra goes upstairs he tries to make dinner. The tissues catch on fire, which spreads to the sprayed counter and ends up setting the entire kitchen on fire.
| 136 | 14 | "Snow Day" | Gary Halvorson | Kathy Ann Stumpe | January 14, 2002 | 0114 | 21.06 |
Ray, Debra, Robert and Amy are stuck with Marie and Frank when a snowstorm blows in. They all have a great time dancing, until Debra says to Frank, "I can't believe I'm actually having a good time with you". He gets upset and walks away. When she tries to apologize, Marie points out that Debra thinks she is better than the Barones. She denies it, but Ray points out all the crazy things his family does. She finally, out of sheer frustration agrees with him, and goes to apologize to Frank. In the end, they all make up and dance.
| 137 | 15 | "Cookies" | Gary Halvorson | Steve Skrovan | January 28, 2002 | 0115 | 20.64 |
The Frontier Girls hold a competition to sell cookies. Ray and the troop leader, Peggy, do not get along. Peggy assigns "Ally's Dad" to selling cookies in front of Petey's Mufflers, a dead spot. When Ray discovers that Peggy has swooped into his neighborhood and sold cookies to Marie and Frank, he sets up a table at her high-traffic spot in front of Marco's Pizza. They end up having a huge fight, in which Peggy beats him. Finally Debra saves him and Ray wins the beach chair by selling the most number of cookies.
| 138 | 16 | "Lucky Suit" | Gary Halvorson | Tucker Cawley | February 4, 2002 | 0116 | 20.94 |
Robert gets an interview with the FBI and decides to wear his lucky suit. Marie over-irons the suit while distracted and he wears another suit. During the interview Marie sends an apologetic fax to the interviewer which embarrasses Robert. When he returns home he yells at Marie, calling her a saboteur and telling her to stay out of his life. Marie, instead of doing this, then personally goes to the FBI office with cookies, where under coaxing, she confesses that while Robert was going to retire and this new job scared her, she wants him to be happy. When she goes to visit Robert, he reveals a recent conversation with the interviewer over Marie's visit and forgives her.
| 139 | 17 | "The Skit" | Gary Halvorson | Lew Schneider | February 25, 2002 | 0117 | 22.48 |
Ray and Debra write a skit for Lee and Stan's anniversary party, in which they compare Stan and Lee's normal marriage to Marie and Frank's unusual one. They are a big hit at the party. Later, Marie and Frank imitate Debra and Ray, and they get offended. When Robert accuses them of being too sensitive and not able to take a joke, they pretend that they can.
| 140 | 18 | "The Breakup Tape" | Jerry Zaks | Tom Caltabiano & Aaron Shure | March 4, 2002 | 0118 | 21.63 |
Debra finds a tape of Ray's, a message left from an old girlfriend of his: she dumped him over the phone. Debra is curious to know why Ray kept it all these years. They start discussing gifts from previous relationships and Debra points out all the items in the house that were gifts from her old boyfriends. Ray gets new substitutes and tries to throw all the old gifts away, including his own.
| 141 | 19 | "Talk to Your Daughter" | Jerry Zaks | Tucker Cawley & Ray Romano | March 18, 2002 | 0119 | 21.24 |
Ray is finally able to talk with Ally about the "birds and the bees", but it turns out that what she really wants to know is the meaning of life. Ray, totally unprepared, tries to talk with his family about the answer, with some unfortunate results.
| 142 | 20 | "A Vote for Debra" | Jerry Zaks | Lew Schneider & Steve Skrovan | March 25, 2002 | 0120 | 22.01 |
Debra decides to run for school president. Ray isn't sure he can handle the kids by himself during all those meetings so he votes against her. When Debra finds out, she accuses him of being non-supportive and mentions that at the potluck dinner at school she was so ashamed of him she told people she did not know him. This upsets Ray, since denying he exists in no way resembles voting against her. Realizing that she is once again the worse partner in their marriage, Debra apologizes.
| Special | TBA | "The First Six Years" | Kenneth Shapiro | Philip Rosenthal, Ray Romano & Tony DeSena | April 28, 2002 | 0125 | 16.32 |
An hour of the best moments of Everybody Loves Raymond's first six years. With interviews from celebrities about why they love the show and how they can relate to the characters.
| 143 | 21 | "Call Me Mom" | Kenneth Shapiro | George B. White III & Joe Rubin | April 29, 2002 | 0121 | 17.55 |
Ray calls Debra's mother "Mom" in front of Marie, which offends her. Ray then convinces Debra to call Marie "Mom". When Debra does so, Marie is cold to her and asks not to do that. Debra is hurt and Ray confronts Marie. Finally Marie agrees to Debra calling her "Mom", but then this offends Lois. Everyone agrees to go back to calling each other what they had before, and which makes Marie and Lois very happy.
| 144 | 22 | "Mother's Day" | Gary Halvorson | Jennifer Crittenden | May 6, 2002 | 0122 | 19.46 |
When Debra is struggling with the kids, Marie barges in with her friends for a knock-knock joke. Debra gets angry and yells at her. Marie takes an offense and gives Debra the silent treatment. After Ray talks to her, she gives Debra an apology that is very insulting, again placing Marie in front of Debra. She is insulted with this and they both give themselves the silent treatment. Mother's Day arrives and both the mothers are at loggerheads. Meanwhile, Ray, Robert and Frank are confronted by both Debra and Marie to choose sides, placing them in the difficult positions.
| 145 | 23 | "The Bigger Person" | Gary Halvorson | Tucker Cawley & Lew Schneider | May 13, 2002 | 0124 | 19.41 |
The feud continues, but Ray and Frank discover that they can use this feud to their advantage. Robert is not too thrilled, and tries to patch things up by bringing his brother's and Frank’s scheme in open to place himself to his advantage. Nothing works and all are miserable again.
| 146 | 24 | "The First Time" | Gary Halvorson | Tom Caltabiano & Mike Royce & Ray Romano | May 20, 2002 | 0123 | 20.18 |
When Debra turns down Ray for sex again, he makes her sign a pact for a nooner the next day. Marie and Debra are totally ignoring each other, and when Marie returns an old gift, Debra gets mad and tears up the pact. She points out that Ray is incapable of reading her mood and reminds him of the first time they were together. In the flashback, Debra invites Ray for a candle light dinner. Ray's friends think it's an invitation for sex. Marie eavesdrops and decides to ruin their evening by barging in with Frank, Robert, Father Hubley and a lasagna. When Debra realizes the situation, she asks Marie to be frank and open in the future. Remembering this event, Debra tries to patch things up with Marie, but Marie gets mad when she discovers that Ray and Debra had sex fifteen years ago, despite her interference, and doesn't take the apology back. Note: This is the last season finale of the series that is a "flashback."
