= Florence Hanford =

American television chef (1909–2008)

Florence P. Hanford (née Peirce) (June 23, 1909 – July 1, 2008) was a home economist who was best known for her television cooking show Television Kitchen, which aired 1,006 episodes between 1949 and 1969. The show was aired live at 2:30 PM Wednesdays on Channel 3 in Philadelphia, WRCV-TV WPTZ-TV, which was the only airwave available in Philadelphia at that time, and later on Channel 6. It was sponsored by the Philadelphia Electric Company and was one of the earliest televised cooking shows, closely following that of James Beard. She published books of television recipes in 1964 and 1969.

She grew up in Bristol, Pennsylvania, and studied home economics at Temple University, where she earned a bachelor's degree in education in June 1931. She married Harry B. Hanford the same month. She worked as a substitute teacher and also taught cooking to nursing students at Temple University prior to her employment with Philadelphia Electric (now PECO). In 1947, she auditioned for a cooking show position after it was learned that the model previously selected could not cook. The show was called Television Matinee, which evolved into Television Kitchen.

She and her husband built a farmhouse in Glen Mills, Pennsylvania, in 1947, where she lived until shortly before her death in 2008. They raised race horses there. She also produced prize-winning needlepoint. Her husband died in 1978; they had no children.

The Broadcast Pioneers of Philadelphia posthumously inducted Hanford into their Hall of Fame in 2009.
