= Peter Boyle =

American actor (1935–2006)

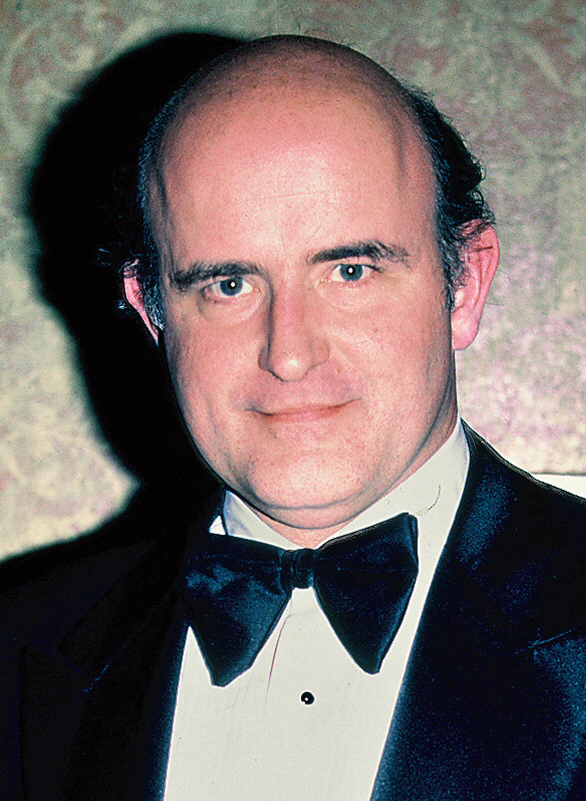
- Boyle in 1978
- Born: Peter Richard Boyle; October 18, 1935; Norristown, Pennsylvania, U.S.
- Died: December 12, 2006 (aged 71); New York City, U.S.
- Occupation: Actor
- Years active: 1956–2006
- Spouse: Loraine Alterman (m. 1977)
- Children: 2

Peter Richard Boyle (October 18, 1935 – December 12, 2006) was an American actor. He is known for his work as a character actor on film and television and received several awards including a Primetime Emmy Award and a Screen Actors Guild Award.

He is known for his role as the patriarch Frank Barone on the CBS sitcom Everybody Loves Raymond from 1996 to 2005. For his role he received seven nominations for the Primetime Emmy Award for Outstanding Supporting Actor in a Comedy Series. For his role as Clyde Bruckman in the Fox science-fiction drama The X-Files in 1996 he won the Primetime Emmy Award for Outstanding Guest Actor in a Drama Series.

On film, he starred as the comical monster in Mel Brooks's film spoof Young Frankenstein (1974). He won praise in both comedic and dramatic parts in Joe (1970), The Candidate (1972), The Friends of Eddie Coyle (1973), Taxi Driver (1976), F.I.S.T. (1978) and Where the Buffalo Roam (1980). He later took supporting roles in Honeymoon in Vegas (1992), The Shadow (1994), That Darn Cat (1997), and The Adventures of Pluto Nash (2002).

== Early life and education ==
Peter Richard Boyle was born in Norristown, Pennsylvania, the son of Alice (née Lewis) and Francis Xavier Boyle. He was the youngest of three children and had two elder sisters. He moved with his family to nearby Philadelphia.

His father, Francis, was a Philadelphia TV personality from 1951 to 1963. Among many other roles, he played the Western show host Chuck Wagon Pete, as well as hosting the after-school children's program Uncle Pete Presents the Little Rascals, which showed vintage Little Rascals and Three Stooges comedy shorts alongside Popeye cartoons. He also appeared at times on Ernie Kovacs' morning program on WPTZ (now KYW-TV).

Boyle's paternal grandparents were Irish immigrants, and his mother was of mostly French, English, Scottish and Irish descent. He was raised Catholic and attended St. Francis de Sales School and West Philadelphia Catholic High School for Boys. After graduating from high school in 1953, Boyle spent three years in formation with the De La Salle Brothers, a Catholic teaching order. He lived in a house of studies with other novices earning a Bachelor of Arts degree from La Salle University in Philadelphia in 1957, but left the order because he did not feel called to religious life. He had described living in a monastery as similar to “living in the Middle Ages.”

While in Philadelphia, he worked as a cameraman on the cooking show Television Kitchen hosted by Florence Hanford.

After graduating from Officer Candidate School in 1959, he was commissioned as an ensign in the United States Navy, but his military career was shortened by a nervous breakdown. In New York City, Boyle studied with acting coach Uta Hagen at HB Studio while working as a postal clerk and a maitre d'.

== Career ==
=== 1960s–1971: Early roles and breakthrough ===
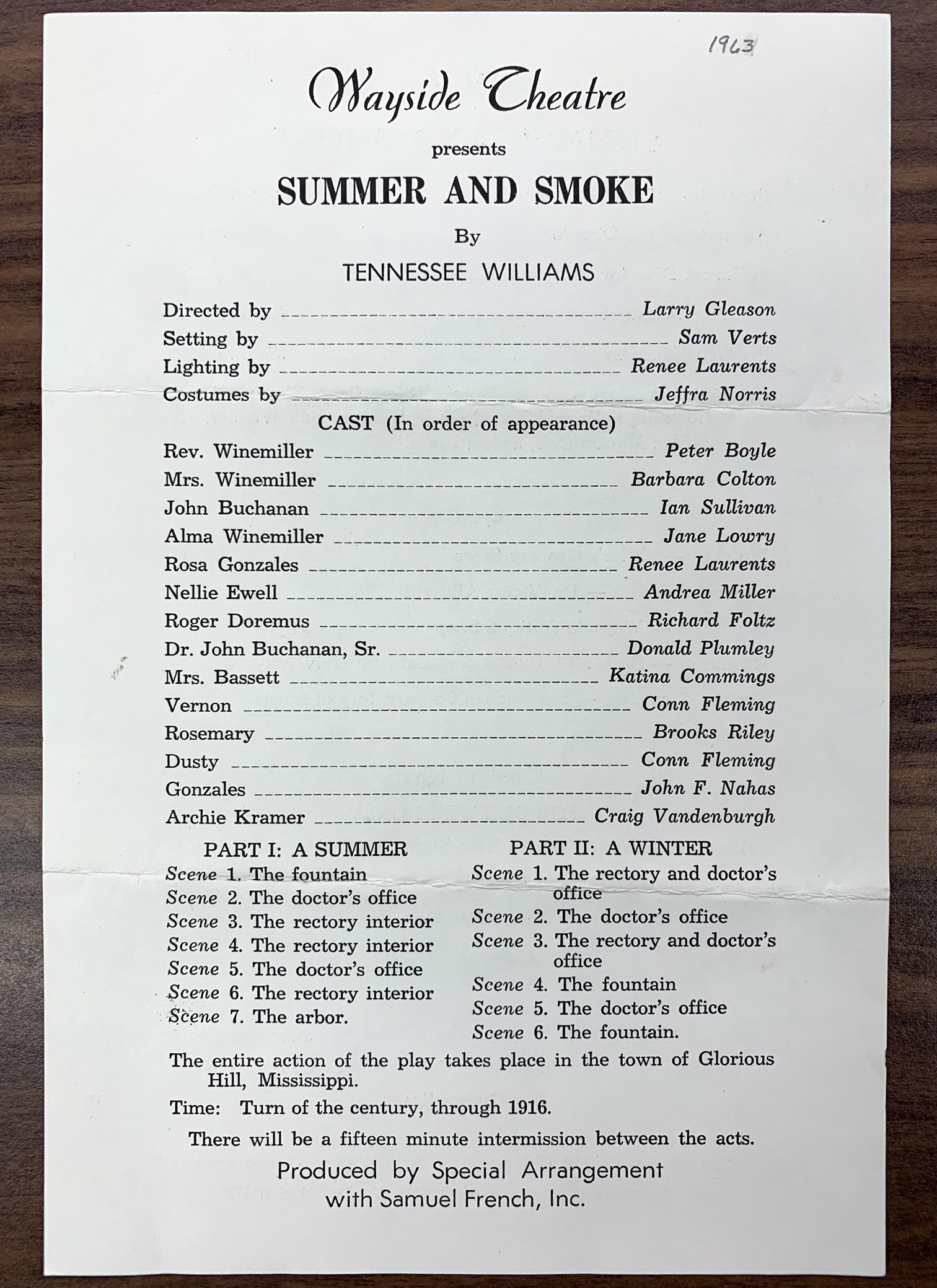
A program from Wayside Theatre listing Boyle as one of the actors in the 1963 production of ''Summer and Smoke

In 1963, Boyle was hired for the Wayside Theatre's opening season. One of his starring roles that year was in Summer and Smoke by Tennessee Williams. Boyle played Murray the cop in a touring company of Neil Simon's The Odd Couple, leaving the tour in Chicago and joining The Second City ensemble there. He had a brief scene as the manager of an indoor shooting range in the critically acclaimed 1969 film Medium Cool, filmed in Chicago.

Boyle gained acclaim for his first starring role as the title character, a bigoted New York City factory worker, in the 1970 movie Joe. The film's release was surrounded by controversy over its violence and language. During this time, Boyle became close friends with actress Jane Fonda, and he participated with her in many protests against the Vietnam War. After seeing people cheer at his role in Joe, Boyle refused the lead role in The French Connection (1971), as well as other film and television roles that he believed glamorized violence. However, in 1974, he starred in a film based on the life of murdered New York gangster "Crazy" Joey Gallo, called Crazy Joe.

=== 1972–1995: Character actor roles ===
His next major role was as the campaign manager for a U.S. Senate candidate (Robert Redford) in The Candidate (1972). In 1973, he appeared in Steelyard Blues with Jane Fonda and Donald Sutherland, a film about a bunch of misfits trying to get a Catalina flying boat in a scrapyard flying again so they could fly away to somewhere with not so many rules. He also played an Irish mobster opposite Robert Mitchum in The Friends of Eddie Coyle (1973). Boyle had another hit role as Frankenstein's monster in the 1974 Mel Brooks comedy Young Frankenstein, in which, in an homage to King Kong, the monster is placed onstage in top hat and tails, grunt-singing and dancing to "Puttin' on the Ritz". Boyle said at the time, "The Frankenstein monster I play is a baby. He's big and ugly and scary, but he's just been born, remember, and it's been traumatic, and to him the whole world is a brand-new, alien environment. That's how I'm playing it". Boyle met his wife, Loraine Alterman, on the set of Young Frankenstein while she was there as a reporter for Rolling Stone. He was still in his Frankenstein makeup when he asked her for a date. Through Alterman and her friend Yoko Ono, Boyle became friends with John Lennon, who was the best man at Boyle and Alterman's 1977 wedding. Boyle and his wife had two daughters, Lucy and Amy.

Boyle received his first Emmy nomination for his acclaimed dramatic performance in the 1977 television film Tail Gunner Joe, in which he played Senator Joseph McCarthy. He was more often cast as a character actor than as a leading man. His roles include the philosophical cab driver Wizard in Martin Scorsese's Taxi Driver (1976), starring Robert De Niro; a bar owner and fence in The Brink's Job (1978); the private detective hired in Hardcore (1979); the attorney of gonzo journalist Hunter S. Thompson (played by Bill Murray) in Where the Buffalo Roam (1980); a corrupt space mining-facility boss in the science-fiction film Outland (1981), opposite Sean Connery; Boatswain Moon in the (1983) pirate comedy Yellowbeard, also starring Cheech and Chong, Madeline Kahn, and members of the comedy troupe Monty Python.

In 1984, he played a local crime boss named Jocko Dundee on his way to retirement, starring with Michael Keaton in the comedy film Johnny Dangerously, a psychiatric patient who belts out a Ray Charles song in the comedy The Dream Team (1989), also starring Michael Keaton; a boss of an unscrupulous corporation in the sci-fi movie Solar Crisis (1990) with Charlton Heston and Jack Palance; the title character's cab driver in The Shadow (1994), starring Alec Baldwin; the father of Sandra Bullock's fiancée in While You Were Sleeping (1995); the corporate raider out to buy Eddie Murphy's medical partnership in Dr. Dolittle (1998); the hateful father of Billy Bob Thornton's prison-guard character in Monster's Ball (2001); Muta in The Cat Returns (2002); and Old Man Wickles in the comedy Scooby Doo 2: Monsters Unleashed (2004). Boyle was also in all three of The Santa Clause films. In the original, The Santa Clause (1994), he plays Scott Calvin's boss Mr. Whittle. In The Santa Clause 2 (2002) and The Santa Clause 3: The Escape Clause (2006), he plays Father Time. In cameo roles, he can be seen as a police captain in Malcolm X (1992), and as a drawbridge operator in Porky's Revenge (1985). In 1992, he starred in Alex Cox's Death and the Compass, an adaptation of Jorge Luis Borges' La Muerte y la Brujula. However, the film was not released until 1996.

His New York theater work included playing a comedian who is the object of The Roast, a 1980 Broadway play directed by Carl Reiner. Also in 1980, he co-starred with Tommy Lee Jones in an off-Broadway production of playwright Sam Shepard's acclaimed True West. Two years later, Boyle played the head of a dysfunctional family in Joe Pintauro's less well-received Snow Orchid, at the Circle Repertory.

In 1986, Boyle played the title role of the television series Joe Bash, created by Danny Arnold. The comedy drama followed the life of a lonely, world-weary, and sometimes compromised New York City beat cop, whose closest friend was a prostitute, played by actress DeLane Matthews.

In October 1990, Boyle suffered a near-fatal stroke that rendered him completely speechless and immobile for nearly six months. After recovering, he went on to win an Emmy Award in 1996 as Outstanding Guest Actor in a Drama Series for his appearance on The X-Files. In the episode, "Clyde Bruckman's Final Repose", he played an insurance salesman who could see selected things in the near future, particularly others' deaths. Bruckman was named after a real person, also named Clyde Bruckman, who was a comedy director and writer who had worked with Buster Keaton, Laurel and Hardy and The Three Stooges among others. Boyle also guest-starred in two episodes as Bill Church Sr. in Lois and Clark: The New Adventures of Superman. He appears in Sony Music's unaired Roger Waters music video "Three Wishes" (1992) as a scruffy genie in a dirty coat and red scarf, who tries to tempt Waters at a desert diner.

=== 1996–2005: Everybody Loves Raymond ===
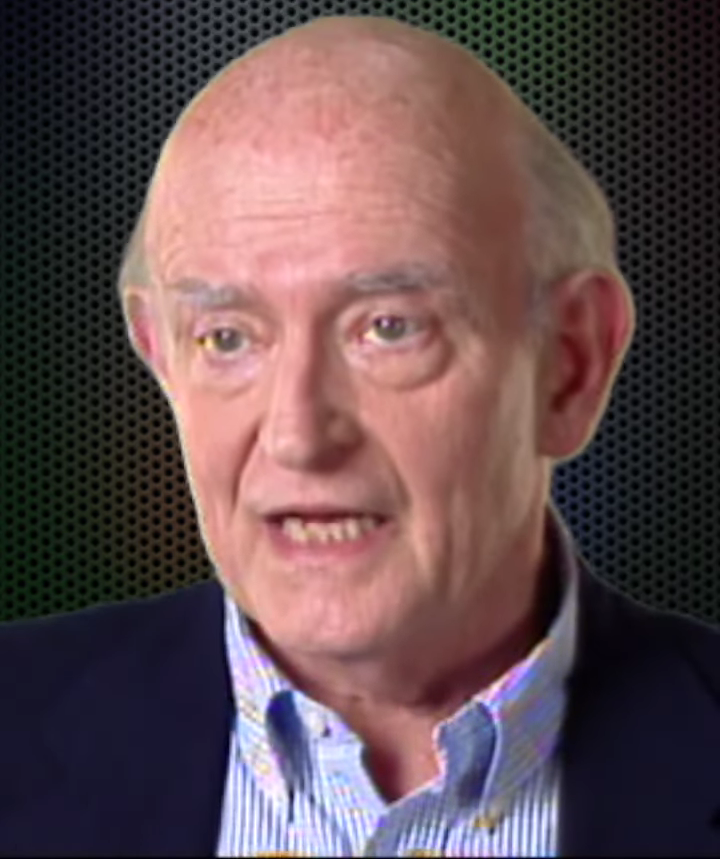
Boyle during an interview c. 2005–2006

Boyle played Frank Barone in the CBS sitcom Everybody Loves Raymond, which aired from 1996 to 2005. He was nominated for an Emmy seven times for this role and never won, though fellow co-stars Brad Garrett, Ray Romano, Patricia Heaton, and Doris Roberts won at least one Emmy each for their performances.

In 1999, he had a heart attack on the set of Everybody Loves Raymond. He soon regained his health and returned to the series. After the incident, Boyle was drawn back to his Catholic faith and resumed attending Mass.

In 2001, he appeared in the film Monster's Ball as the bigoted father of Billy Bob Thornton's character. Introduced by comedian Carlos Mencia as "the most honest man in show business", Boyle made guest appearances on three episodes of the Comedy Central program Mind of Mencia, one of which was shown as a tribute in a segment made before Boyle's death, in which he read hate mail, explained the "hidden meanings" behind bumper stickers, and occasionally told Mencia how he felt about him.

Starting in late 2005, Boyle and former television wife Doris Roberts appeared in television commercials for the 75th anniversary of Alka-Seltzer, reprising the famous line, "I can't believe I ate that whole thing!" Although this quote has entered into popular culture, it is often misquoted as, "...the whole thing."

== Death and reactions ==
On December 12, 2006, Boyle died at the age of 71 at New York Presbyterian Hospital in New York City after having suffered from multiple myeloma and heart disease. He had been diagnosed with myeloma in 2002 after experiencing difficulty breathing and kept his diagnosis private. At the time of his death, he had completed his roles in the films All Roads Lead Home and The Santa Clause 3: The Escape Clause—the latter being released one month before his death—and was scheduled to appear in The Golden Boys. The end credits of All Roads Lead Home include a dedication to his memory.

Boyle's death had a tremendous effect on his former co-stars from Everybody Loves Raymond, which had ceased production less than two years before his death. When asked to comment on Boyle's death, his cast members heaped praise on Boyle. Ray Romano was personally affected by the loss, saying, "He gave me great advice, he always made me laugh, and the way he connected with everyone around him amazed me." Patricia Heaton stated, "Peter was an incredible man who made all of us who had the privilege of working with him aspire to be better actors."

On October 18, 2007 (which would have been Boyle's 72nd birthday), his friend Bruce Springsteen dedicated "Meeting Across the River" to Boyle during a Madison Square Garden concert with the E Street Band in New York. Springsteen segued into "Jungleland" in memory of Boyle, stating: "An old friend died a while back – we met him when we first came to New York City... Today would have been his birthday."

After Boyle died, his widow Loraine Alterman Boyle established the Peter Boyle Memorial Fund in support of the International Myeloma Foundation (IMF). Boyle's closest friends, family, and co-stars have since gathered yearly for a comedy celebration fundraiser in Los Angeles. Acting as a tribute to Boyle, the annual event is hosted by Ray Romano and has included performances by many comedic veterans including Dana Carvey, Fred Willard, Martin Mull, Richard Lewis, Kevin James, Jeff Garlin, and Martin Short. Performances typically revolve around Boyle's life, recalling favorite moments with the actor. The comedy celebration has been noted as the most successful fundraiser in IMF history. The first event held in 2007 raised over $550,000, while the following year over $600,000 was raised for the Peter Boyle Memorial Fund in support of the IMF's research programs.

== Filmography ==
=== Film ===
Year	Title	Role	Notes
1966	The Group	Unknown role	Uncredited
1968	The Virgin President	General Heath	
1969	Medium Cool	Gun Clinic Manager	
1969	The Monitors	Production Manager	
1970	Joe	Joe Curran	
1970	Diary of a Mad Housewife	Man in Group Therapy Session	Uncredited
1971	T.R. Baskin	Jack Mitchell	
1972	The Candidate	Marvin Lucas	
1972	F.T.A.	Himself	Documentary
1973	Steelyard Blues	Eagle Thornberry	
1973	Slither	Barry Fenaka	
1973	Kid Blue	Preacher Bob	
1973	The Friends of Eddie Coyle	Dillon	
1974	Crazy Joe	Joe Gallo	
1974	Young Frankenstein	The Monster	
1974	Ghost in the Noonday Sun	Ras Mohammed	
1976	Taxi Driver	Wizard	
1976	Swashbuckler	Lord Durant	
1978	F.I.S.T.	Max Graham	
1978	The Brink's Job	Joe McGinnis	
1979	Hardcore	Andy Mast	
1979	Beyond the Poseidon Adventure	Frank Mazzetti	
1980	Where the Buffalo Roam	Carl Lazlo	
1980	In God We Trust (or Gimme That Prime Time Religion)	Dr. Sebastian Melmoth	
1981	Outland	Mark B. Sheppard	
1982	Hammett	Jimmy Ryan	
1983	Yellowbeard	Moon	
1984	Johnny Dangerously	Jocko Dundee	
1985	Turk 182	Detective Ryan	
1987	Surrender	Jay	
1987	Walker	Cornelius Vanderbilt	
1988	The in Crowd	"Uncle Pete" Boyle	
1988	Red Heat	Lou Donnelly	
1988	Funny	Himself	Documentary
1989	The Dream Team	Jack McDermott	
1989	Speed Zone	Police Chief Spiro T. Edsel	
1990	Solar Crisis	Arnold Teague	
1990	Men of Respect	Matt Duffy	
1991	Kickboxer 2: The Road Back	Justin Maciah	
1992	Nervous Ticks	Ron Rudman	
1992	Honeymoon in Vegas	Chief Orman	
1992	Malcolm X	Captain Green	
1994	Bulletproof Heart	George	
1994	The Shadow	Moe Shrevnitz	
1994	The Santa Clause	Mr. Whittle	
1994	The Surgeon	Lieutenant McEllwaine	
1995	Born to Be Wild	Gus Charnley	
1995	While You Were Sleeping	Ox Callaghan	
1996	Sweet Evil	Jay Glass	
1996	Milk & Money	Belted Galloway	
1997	That Darn Cat	Pa	
1998	Species II	Dr. Herman Cromwell	Uncredited
1998	Dr. Dolittle	Calloway	
2001	Monster's Ball	Buck Grotowski	
2001	Lunch Break	Lou	Short
2002	The Cat Returns	Muta (voice role)	English version
2002	The Adventures of Pluto Nash	Rowland	
2002	The Santa Clause 2	Father Time	Uncredited Cameo
2003	True Confessions of the Legendary Figures	Father Time	Short
2003	Bitter Jester	Himself	Documentary
2004	Scooby-Doo 2: Monsters Unleashed	Old Man Wickles	
2006	The Santa Clause 3: The Escape Clause	Father Time	
2007	The Shallow End of the Ocean	Larry Aims (voice role)	Short, posthumous release
2008	All Roads Lead Home	Poovey	Posthumous release

=== Television ===
Year	Title	Role	Notes
1973	The Man Who Could Talk to Kids	Charlie Datweiler	TV movie
1976, 1999	Saturday Night Live	Himself / host / guest	2 episodes
1977	Tail Gunner Joe	Joe McCarthy	TV movie
1979	From Here to Eternity	Fatso Judson	Miniseries
1986	Joe Bash	Joe Bash	6 episodes
1987	Conspiracy: The Trial of the Chicago 8	David Dellinger	TV movie
1987	Echoes in the Darkness	Sergeant Joe Van Nort	Miniseries
1988	Superman 50th Anniversary	James "Jimmy" Malone	TV movie
1988	Cagney & Lacey	Phillip Greenlow	Episode: "A Class Act"
1988	Disaster at Silo 7	General Sanger	TV movie
1989	Guts and Glory: The Rise and Fall of Oliver North	Admiral John Poindexter	TV movie
1989–1991	Midnight Caller	J.J. Killian	3 episodes
1990	American Playwrights Theater: The One-Acts	Jake	Episode: "27 Wagons Full of Cotton"
1990	Challenger	Roger Boisjoly	TV movie
1990	Poochinski	Stanley Poochinski (voice role)	TV Short
1990	The Tragedy of Flight 103: The Inside Story	Fred Ford	TV movie
1992	In the Line of Duty: Street War	Detective Dan Reilly	TV movie
1992	Cuentos de Borges	Erik Lonnrot	Episode: "Death and the Compass"
1992–1993	Flying Blind	Alicia's Dad	2 episodes
1993	Tribeca	Harry	Episode: "The Hopeless Romantic"
1993	Taking the Heat	Judge	TV movie
1994	Royce	Huggins	TV movie
1994	Philly Heat	Stanislas Kelly	TV pilot
1994–1995	NYPD Blue	Dan Breen	5 episodes
1994–1995	Lois & Clark: The New Adventures of Superman	Bill Church	2 episodes
1995	The X-Files	Clyde Bruckman	Episode: "Clyde Bruckman's Final Repose"
1996	In the Lake of the Woods	Tony Carbo	TV movie
1996–1997	The Single Guy	Walter Eliot	2 episodes
1996–2005	Everybody Loves Raymond	Frank Barone	210 episodes
1997	A Deadly Vision	Detective Salvatore DaVinci	TV movie
1997	Cosby	Frank Barone	Episode: "Lucas Raymondicus"
1998	The King of Queens	Frank Barone	Episode: "Road Rage"
1999	Hollywood Squares	Himself / Panelist	5 episodes
2000	Behind the Music	Himself	Episode: "John Lennon: The Last Years"
2002	Master Spy: The Robert Hanssen Story	Howard Hanssen	TV movie
2005–2006	Mind of Mencia	Himself	2 episodes
2005	Tripping the Rift	Marvin (voice role)	Episode: "Roswell"

== Awards and nominations ==
Year	Category	Project	Results	Ref.
Primetime Emmy Awards
1977	Outstanding Lead Actor in a Drama or Comedy Special	Tail Gunner Joe	Nominated	
1989	Outstanding Guest Actor in a Drama Series	Midnight Caller (episode: "Fathers and Sins")	Nominated	
1996	Outstanding Guest Actor in a Drama Series	The X-Files (episode: "Clyde Bruckman's Final Repose")	Won	
1999	Outstanding Supporting Actor in a Comedy Series	Everybody Loves Raymond (episodes: "Driving Frank" + "Ping Pong")	Nominated	
2000	Outstanding Supporting Actor in a Comedy Series	Everybody Loves Raymond (episodes: "Prodigal Son" + "Debra Makes Something Good")	Nominated	
2001	Outstanding Supporting Actor in a Comedy Series	Everybody Loves Raymond (episodes: "Frank Paints the House" + "Wallpaper")	Nominated	
2002	Outstanding Supporting Actor in a Comedy Series	Everybody Loves Raymond (episodes: "Frank Goes Downstairs" + "The Kicker")	Nominated	
2003	Outstanding Supporting Actor in a Comedy Series	Everybody Loves Raymond (episodes: "Grandpa Steals" + "Meeting the Parents")	Nominated	
2004	Outstanding Supporting Actor in a Comedy Series	Everybody Loves Raymond (episodes: "Jazz Records" + "The Mentor")	Nominated	
2005	Outstanding Supporting Actor in a Comedy Series	Everybody Loves Raymond (episodes: "Boys Therapy" + "Tasteless Frank")	Nominated	
Screen Actors Guild Awards
1999	Outstanding Ensemble in a Comedy Series	Everybody Loves Raymond (season 3)	Nominated	
2000	Outstanding Ensemble in a Comedy Series	Everybody Loves Raymond (season 4)	Nominated	
2002	Outstanding Actor in a Comedy Series	Everybody Loves Raymond (season 5)	Nominated	
2002	Outstanding Ensemble in a Comedy Series	Everybody Loves Raymond (season 5)	Nominated	
2003	Outstanding Ensemble in a Comedy Series	Everybody Loves Raymond (season 6)	Won	
2004	Outstanding Actor in a Comedy Series	Everybody Loves Raymond (season 7)	Nominated	
2004	Outstanding Ensemble in a Comedy Series	Everybody Loves Raymond (season 7)	Nominated	
2005	Outstanding Ensemble in a Comedy Series	Everybody Loves Raymond (season 8)	Nominated	
2006	Outstanding Ensemble in a Comedy Series	Everybody Loves Raymond (season 9)	Nominated	
Miscellaneous awards
1996	Sci Fi Magazine Awards Best Guest Actor in a Genre Television Series	The X-Files	Won	
2000	American Comedy Awards Funniest Supporting Male in a Television Series	Everybody Loves Raymond	Nominated	
1998	Viewers for Quality Television Best Supporting Actor Comedy Series	Everybody Loves Raymond	Nominated	
1999	Viewers for Quality Television Best Supporting Actor Comedy Series	Everybody Loves Raymond	Nominated	
