= 14th Primetime Emmy Awards =

1962 American television programming awards

- Date: May 22, 1962
- Location: Hollywood Palladium, Los Angeles, California
- Presented by: Academy of Television Arts and Sciences
- Hosted by: Johnny Carson, Bob Newhart, David Brinkley

Highlights
- Most awards: The Defenders (4)
- Most nominations: Ben Casey (7)
- Outstanding Program Achievement in the Field of Humor: The Bob Newhart Show
- Outstanding Program Achievement in the Field of Drama: The Defenders
- Outstanding Program Achievements in the Fields of Variety and Music - Variety: The Garry Moore Show
- Outstanding Program Achievements in the Fields of Variety and Music - Music: Leonard Bernstein and the New York Philharmonic in Japan
- The Program of the Year: Hallmark Hall of Fame: "Victoria Regina"

Television/radio coverage
- Network: NBC

The 14th Emmy Awards, later referred to as the 14th Primetime Emmy Awards, were held on May 22, 1962, to honor the best in television of the year. It was hosted by Johnny Carson in New York, Bob Newhart in Los Angeles and David Brinkley in Washington, DC. All nominations are listed, with winners in bold and series' networks are in parentheses.

The top show of the night was the CBS courtroom drama The Defenders which swept the four major categories it was nominated in. The Bob Newhart Show won top honors for comedy, and in doing so, became the first show to win a top program prize (comedy or drama) for what would be the show's only season. Composer Richard Rodgers would also become the first person to complete the Grand Slam of entertainment awards (Emmy, Grammy, Oscar, and Tony) when winning for Outstanding Achievement in Original Music Composed with Winston Churchill: The Valiant Years.

Among the better-known presenters were Fred Astaire, Lucille Ball, Barbara Stanwyck, Judy Garland, Jimmy Durante, Jack Webb, Walter Brennan, Eartha Kitt, Supreme Court Justice William O. Douglas, and Cyril Ritchard, whose pronunciation of "tomatoes" as "tomahtoes" greatly amused the audience; he humorously apologized and repeated it with the American pronunciation.

== Winners and nominees ==
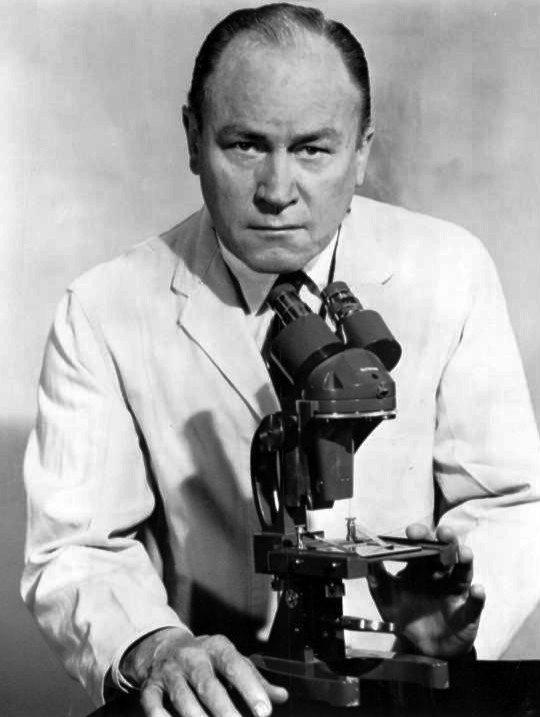
E. G. Marshall, Outstanding Continued Performance by an Actor in a Series (Lead) winner

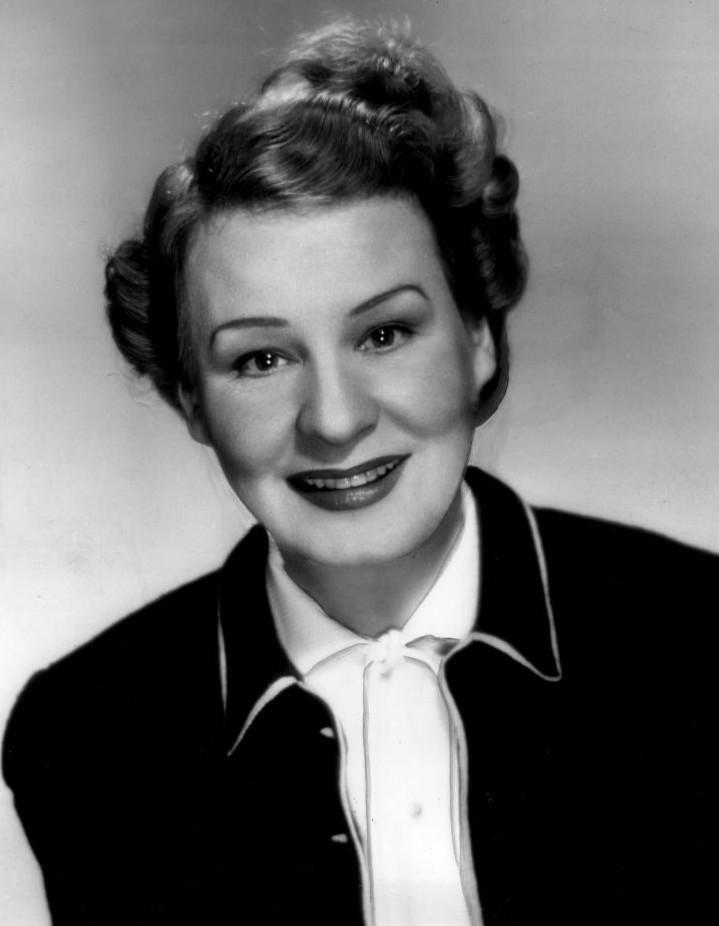
Shirley Booth, Outstanding Continued Performance by an Actress in a Series (Lead) winner

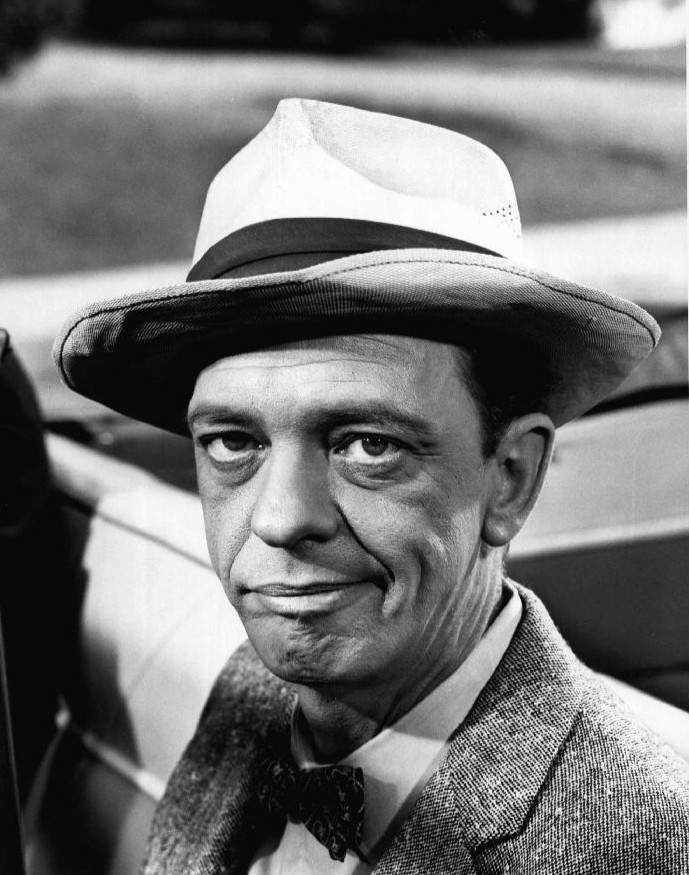
Don Knotts, Outstanding Performance in a Supporting Role by an Actor winner

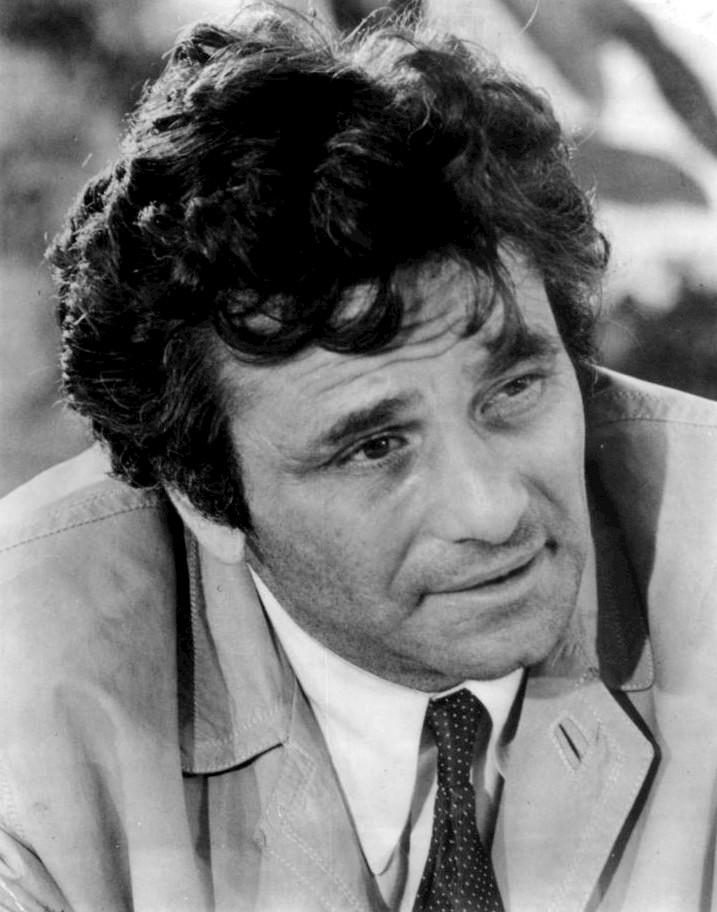
Peter Falk, Outstanding Single Performance by an Actor in a Leading Role winner

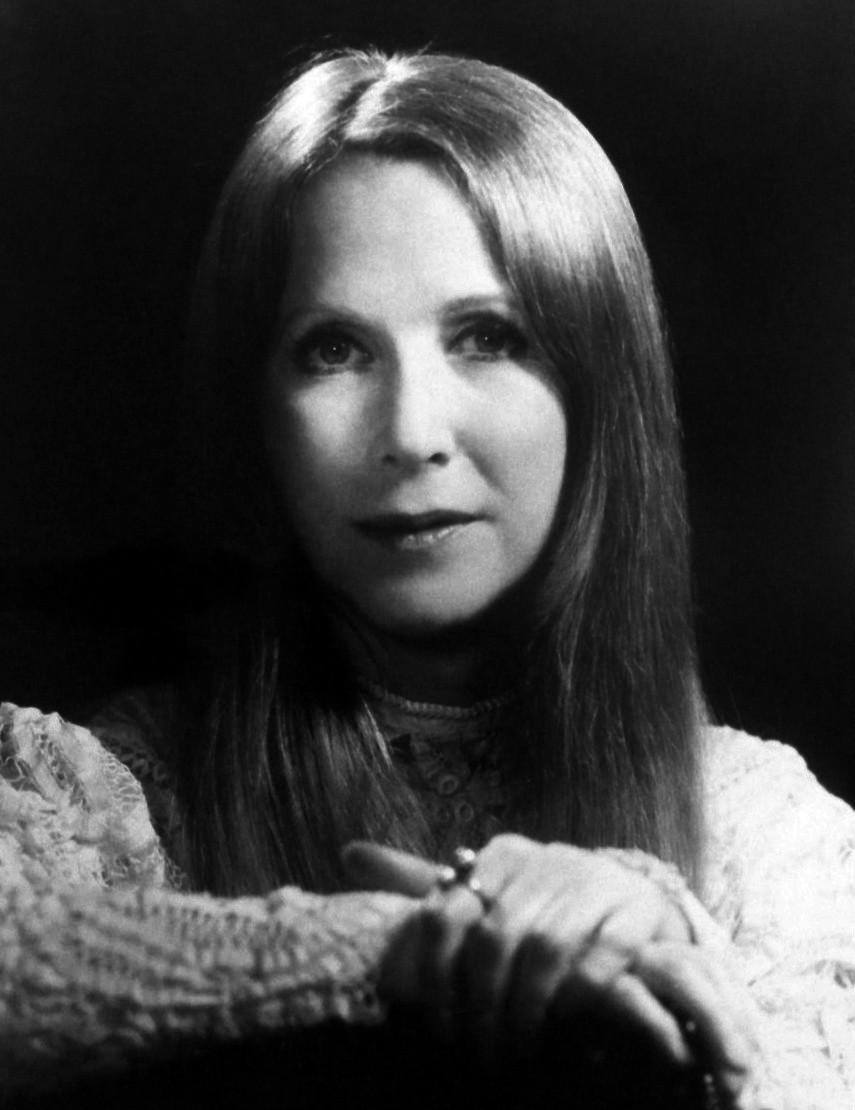
Julie Harris, Outstanding Single Performance by an Actress in a Leading Role winner

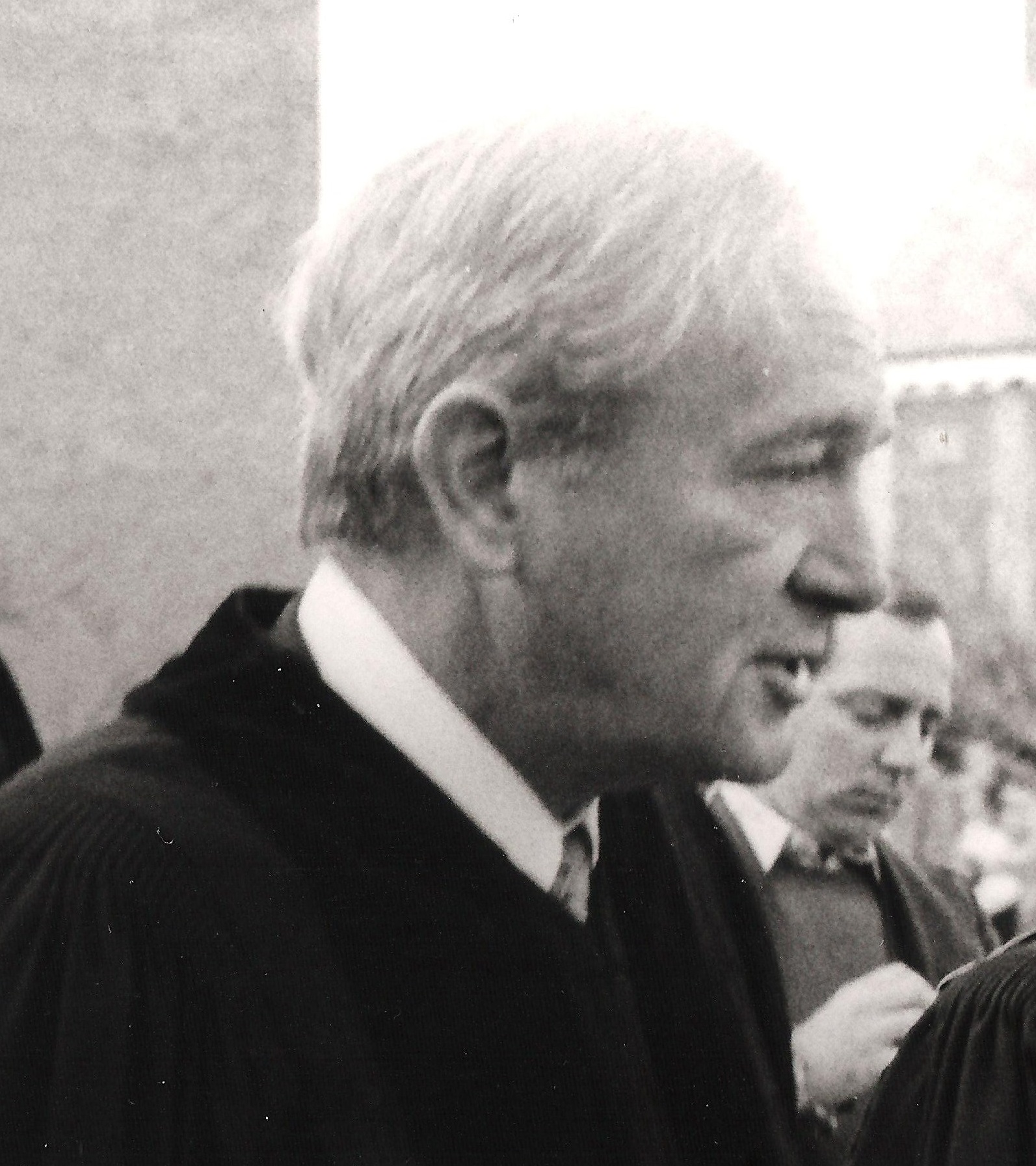
Franklin J. Schaffner, Outstanding Directorial Achievement in Drama winner

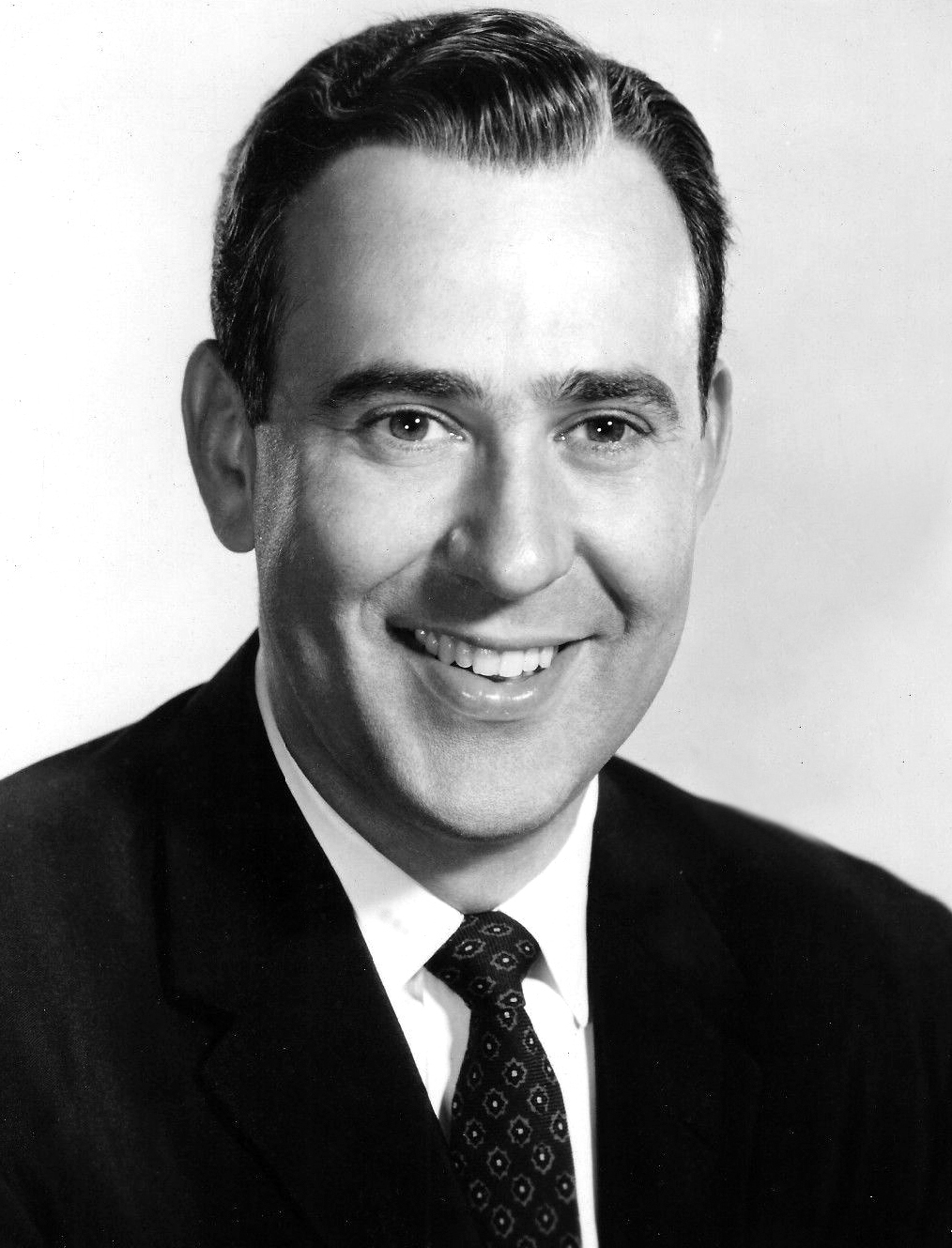
Carl Reiner, Outstanding Writing Achievement in Comedy winner

=== Programs ===
Programs
**Outstanding Program Achievement in the Field of Humor**: **The Bob Newhart Show (NBC)**; The Andy Griffith Show (CBS); Car 54, Where Are You? (NBC); Hazel (NBC); The Red Skelton Show (CBS)	**Outstanding Program Achievement in the Field of Drama**: **The Defenders (CBS)**; Alcoa Premiere (ABC); Ben Casey (ABC); The Dick Powell Theatre (NBC); Hallmark Hall of Fame (NBC); Naked City (ABC)
**Outstanding Program Achievements in the Fields of Variety and Music – Variety**: **The Garry Moore Show (CBS)**; Here's Edie (ABC); The Judy Garland Show (CBS); Perry Como's Kraft Music Hall (NBC); Walt Disney's Wonderful World of Color (NBC)	**Outstanding Program Achievements in the Fields of Variety and Music – Music**: **Leonard Bernstein and the New York Philharmonic in Japan (CBS)**; The Bell Telephone Hour (NBC); Directions (ABC); NBC Television Opera Theatre (NBC)
**Outstanding Daytime Program**: **Purex Summer Specials (NBC)**; Calendar (CBS); The Linkletter Show (CBS); Today (NBC); The Verdict is Yours (CBS)	**Outstanding Program Achievement in the Field of Children's Programming**: **New York Philharmonic Young People's Concerts with Leonard Bernstein (CBS)**; 1, 2, 3 Go! (NBC); Captain Kangaroo (CBS); The Shari Lewis Show (NBC); Update (NBC); Walt Disney's Wonderful World of Color (NBC)
**Outstanding Program Achievement** **in the Field of Educational and Public Affairs Programming**: **David Brinkley's Journal (NBC)**; ABC's Wide World of Sports (ABC); Bell and Howell Close-Up! (ABC); CBS Reports (CBS); Howard K. Smith (ABC); NBC White Paper (NBC)	**The Program of the Year**: **Hallmark Hall of Fame (NBC): "Victoria Regina"**; Bell and Howell Close-Up! (ABC): "Walk in My Shoes"; CBS Reports (CBS): "Biography of a Bookie Joint"; The Judy Garland Show (CBS); Vincent Van Gogh: A Self-Portrait (NBC)

=== Acting ===
==== Lead performances ====
Acting
**Outstanding Continued Performance by an Actor in a Series (Lead)**: **E. G. Marshall as Lawrence Preston in The Defenders (CBS)**; Paul Burke as Det. Adam Flint in Naked City (ABC); Jackie Cooper as Lt. Chick Hennesey in Hennesey (CBS); Vince Edwards as Dr. Ben Casey in Ben Casey (ABC); George Maharis as Buz Murdock in Route 66 (CBS)	**Outstanding Continued Performance by an Actress in a Series (Lead)**: **Shirley Booth as Hazel Burke in Hazel (NBC)**; Gertrude Berg as Sarah Green in The Gertrude Berg Show (CBS); Donna Reed as Donna Stone in The Donna Reed Show (ABC); Mary Stuart as Joanne Gardner Barron Tate Reynolds Vincente Tourneur in Search for Tomorrow (CBS); Cara Williams as Gladys Porter in Pete and Gladys (CBS)

==== Supporting performances ====
**Outstanding Performance in a Supporting Role by an Actor**: **Don Knotts as Deputy Barney Fife in The Andy Griffith Show (CBS)**; Sam Jaffe as Dr. David Zorba in Ben Casey (ABC); Barry Jones as The Dean in Hallmark Hall of Fame (NBC) (Episode: "Victoria Regina"); Horace McMahon as Lt. Mike Parker in Naked City (ABC); George C. Scott as Dr. Karl Anders in Ben Casey (ABC) (Episode: "I Remember a Lemon Tree")	**Outstanding Performance in a Supporting Role by an Actress**: **Pamela Brown as The Duchess of Kent in Hallmark Hall of Fame (NBC) (Episode: "Victoria Regina")**; Jeanne Cooper as Linda Miller in Ben Casey (ABC) (Episode: "But Linda Only Smiled"); Colleen Dewhurst in Focus (NBC); Joan Hackett as Ellen Parker in Ben Casey (ABC) (Episode: "A Certain Time, A Certain Darkness"); Mary Wickes as Maxfield in The Gertrude Berg Show (CBS)

==== Single performances ====
**Outstanding Single Performance by an Actor in a Leading Role**: **Peter Falk as Aristidi Fresco in The Dick Powell Theatre (NBC): "The Price of Tomatoes"**; Milton Berle as Eddie Doyle in The Dick Powell Theatre (NBC): "Doyle Against the House"; James Donald as Prince Albert in Hallmark Hall of Fame (NBC): "Victoria Regina"; Lee Marvin as Hughes in Alcoa Premiere (ABC): "People Need People"; Mickey Rooney as Augie Miller in The Dick Powell Theatre (NBC): "Somebody's Waiting"	**Outstanding Single Performance by an Actress in a Leading Role**: **Julie Harris as Queen Victoria in Hallmark Hall of Fame (NBC): "Victoria Regina"**; Geraldine Brooks as Katherine Barnes in Bus Stop (ABC): "Call Back Yesterday"; Suzanne Pleshette as Julie Lawler in Dr. Kildare (NBC): "Shining Image"; Inger Stevens as Anna Beza in The Dick Powell Theatre (NBC): "The Price of Tomatoes"; Ethel Waters as Jenny Henderson in Route 66 (CBS): "Goodnight, Sweet Blues"

=== Directing ===
Directing
**Outstanding Directorial Achievement in Comedy**: **Car 54, Where Are You? (NBC) – Nat Hiken**; The Dick Van Dyke Show (CBS) – John Rich; The Garry Moore Show (CBS) – Dave Geisel; Henry Fonda and the Family (CBS) – Bud Yorkin; The Red Skelton Show (CBS) – Seymour Berns	**Outstanding Directorial Achievement in Drama**: **The Defenders (CBS) – Franklin J. Schaffner**; Alcoa Premiere (ABC): "People Need People" – Alex Segal; Dr. Kildare (NBC): "Shining Image" – Buzz Kulik; Naked City (ABC) – Arthur Hiller; Westinghouse Presents: "Come Again to Carthage" (CBS) – Jack Smight

=== Writing ===
Writing
**Outstanding Writing Achievement in Comedy**: **The Dick Van Dyke Show (CBS) – Carl Reiner**; The Bob Newhart Show (NBC) – Roland Kibbee, Bob Newhart, Don Hinkley, Milt Rosen, Ernest Chambers, Dean Hargrove, Robert Kaufman, Norm Liebmann, Charles Sherman, Howard Snyder and Larry Siegel; Car 54, Where Are You? (NBC) – Nat Hiken, Tony Webster and Terry Ryan; Chun King Chow Mein Hour (ABC) – Stan Freberg; The Red Skelton Show (CBS) – Ed Simmons, David O'Brien, Martin Ragaway, Arthur Phillips, Al Schwartz, Sherwood Schwartz and Red Skelton	**Outstanding Writing Achievement in Drama**: **The Defenders (CBS) – Reginald Rose**; Alcoa Premiere (ABC): "People Need People" – Henry F. Greenberg; Ben Casey (ABC): "I Remember a Lemon Tree" – Jack Laird; The Dick Powell Theatre (NBC): "The Price of Tomatoes" – Richard Alan Simmons; The Twilight Zone (CBS) – Rod Serling
**Outstanding Writing Achievement in the Documentary Field**: **Vincent Van Gogh: A Self-Portrait (NBC) – Lou Hazam**; Bell and Howell Close-Up! (ABC): "Walk In My Shoes" – Arthur Holch; CBS Reports (CBS): "Biography of a Bookie Joint" – Jay McMullen; NBC White Paper (NBC): "Battle of Newburgh" – Al Wasserman and Arthur Zegart; Purex Summer Specials (NBC) – George Lefferts

== Most major nominations ==
Networks with multiple major nominations (Note: "Major" constitutes the categories listed above: Program, Acting, Directing, and Writing. Does not include the technical categories.)
Network	Number of Nominations
NBC	37
CBS	35
ABC	26

Programs with multiple major nominations
Program	Category	Network	Number of Nominations
Ben Casey	Drama	ABC	7
The Dick Powell Theatre	Drama	NBC	6
Hallmark Hall of Fame	Drama	NBC	6
Alcoa Premiere	Drama	ABC	4
The Defenders	Drama	CBS	4
Naked City	Drama	ABC	4
Bell and Howell Close-Up!	Documentary/Educational	ABC	3
Car 54, Where Are You?	Comedy	NBC	3
CBS Reports	Documentary/Educational	CBS	3
The Red Skelton Show	Comedy	CBS	3
The Andy Griffith Show	Comedy	CBS	2
The Bob Newhart Show	Comedy	NBC	2
The Dick Van Dyke Show	Comedy	CBS	2
Dr. Kildare	Drama	NBC	2
The Garry Moore Show	Comedy/Variety	CBS	2
The Gertrude Berg Show	Comedy	CBS	2
Hazel	Comedy	NBC	2
The Judy Garland Show	Variety	CBS	2
NBC White Paper	Daytime/Documentary	NBC	2
Purex Summer Specials	Daytime/Documentary	NBC	2
Route 66	Drama	CBS	2
Vincent Van Gogh: A Self-Portrait	Documentary	NBC	2
Walt Disney's Wonderful World of Color	Children's/Variety	NBC	2

== Most major awards ==
Networks with multiple major awards
Network	Number of Awards
NBC	10
CBS	9

Programs with multiple major awards
Program	Category	Network	Number of Awards
The Defenders	Drama	CBS	4
Hallmark Hall of Fame	Drama	NBC	3
