= List of Massachusetts General Court members expelled or censured =

The following is a list of Massachusetts General Court members that have been expelled or censured.

== Massachusetts Senate ==
=== Expelled senators ===
Year	Senator	Party	City or Town (District)1	Vote Count	Reason
1937	George W. Stanton	Democratic	Fitchburg (3rd Worcester)	24–13	Senate found his opponent to be the rightful winner of the 1936 election.
1977	Joseph DiCarlo	Democratic	Revere (Suffolk, Essex and Middlesex)	28–8	Convicted of extortion.

== Massachusetts House of Representatives ==
=== Expelled representatives ===
Year	Senator	Party	City or Town (District)1	Vote Count	Reason
1855	Joseph Hiss	Know Nothing	Boston	230–30	Sharing a hotel room with a woman who was not his wife during a controversial legislative investigative trip.
1906	Frank J. Gethro	Democratic	Boston (9th Suffolk)	142–54	Offering another representative money in exchange for his vote on bucket shop legislation.
1916	Harry C. Foster	Republican	Gloucester (21st Essex)	Voice vote	Found to have committed conduct unbecoming a member of the General Court "by collecting money from persons he knew interested in legislation before said General Court"
2014	Carlos Henriquez	Democratic	Boston (5th Suffolk)	146–5	Convicted of assault and battery

=== Censured representatives ===
Year	Senator	Party	City or Town (District)1	Vote Count	Reason
1906	Simon Swig	Republican	Taunton (3rd Bristol)	Voice vote	Making conflicting statements in relation to a representative under investigation (Frank J. Gethro)
1962	Harrison Chadwick	Republican	Winchester (29th Middlesex)	110–98	Failing to substantiate the accusation he made on a television program that bookmakers had an influence the state legislature. House voted to revoke the censure two years later.
