= Victoria Regina (film) =

- Julie Harris and James Donald
- Based on: Victoria Regina by Laurence Housman
- Screenplay by: Robert Hartung
- Directed by: George Schaefer
- Starring: Julie Harris; James Donald; Felix Aylmer; Pamela Brown; Isabel Jeans; Barry Jones; Basil Rathbone; Inga Swenson
- Composers: Brad Fiedel; George Kahn
- Country of origin: United States
- Original language: English

Production
- Producer: George Schaefer
- Running time: 77 minutes
- Production companies: Compass Productions; Hallmark Hall of Fame Productions

Original release
- Network: NBC
- Release: November 30, 1961

Related
- Macbeth (1960); Arsenic & Old Lace (1962)

Victoria Regina is an American historical drama television film that aired on NBC on November 30, 1961, as part of the anthology series Hallmark Hall of Fame. The production, covering 60 years in the life of Queen Victoria, was nominated for seven Primetime Emmy Awards, winning Program of the Year, Outstanding Single Performance by an Actress in a Leading Role (for Julie Harris), and Outstanding Performance in a Supporting Role by an Actress (for Pamela Brown).

== Plot ==
The production depicts the life of Great Britain's Queen Victoria through vignettes starting with her accession to the throne at age 18, covering her romance with Prince Albert, and ending with her time as an elderly widow at age 78.

== Cast ==
The actors noted in the opening credits were:

- Julie Harris as Queen Victoria
- James Donald as Prince Albert
- Felix Aylmer as Lord Melbourne
- Pamela Brown as Duchess of Kent, Victoria's mother
- Isabel Jeans as mistress of the robes
- Barry Jones as the Dean
- Basil Rathbone as Lord Beaconsfield
- Inga Swenson as Lady Jane

== Production ==
Victoria Regina was based on Laurence Housman's play of the same name, which ran on Broadway in the 1930s with Helen Hayes in the title role. Robert Hartung adapted Housman's play for television. George Schaefer served as producer and director.

One of the film's challenges was to have Harris believably age by 60 years from age 18 to age 78. NBC makeup artist Bob O'Bradovich used a combination of makeup and various devices, including a rubber mask and false nose to achieve the effect. One reviewer noted that the devices were a debit to the production, as Harris seemed "barely animated" behind the layers of latex.

The film aired on NBC on November 30, 1961, as part of the Hallmark Hall of Fame series.

== Reception ==
=== Reviews ===
In The New York Times, Jack Gould described Harris' performance as impeccable, magnificent, inspired, touching, and "a work of flowing ecstasy and poignancy." Gould also credited Robert O'Bradovich with a triumph for his makeup work.

In the Los Angeles Times, Cecil Smith called it "a rich and delicately woven tapestry that gave television its most rewarding 90 minutes of the season." For special honors, he called out Harris ("a superb performance"), Warren Clymer (scenery), and Noel Taylor (costumes).

Cynthia Lowry of the Associated Press wrote that it was "beautifully produced" and "meticulously performed". However, partly due to the shadow cast by Helen Hayes who played the role in the original stage production, Lowry opined that Harris "never was convincing as the great imperious queen".

Fred Danzig of the UPI wrote: "Beautiful, beautiful acting. Sensible and sensitive direction by George Schaefer. And my compliments to Miss Harris's makeup man – 60 years from start to finish – was accomplished with impressive skill." Danzig also praised writer Robert Hartung for improving upon the original play.

In January 1962, Percy Shain of The Boston Globe selected Victoria Regina as television's best drama of 1961, noting that it was a "fairly easy" pick.

=== Emmy Awards ===
The production was nominated for seven Primetime Emmy Awards, winning three: Program of the Year, Outstanding Single Performance by an Actress in a Leading Role (for Harris), and Outstanding Performance in a Supporting Role by an Actress (for Brown). Additional nominations included Outstanding Single Performance by an Actor in a Leading Role for James Donald and Outstanding Performance in a Supporting Role by an Actor for Barry Jones.
