= Victoria Regina (play) =

1934 play by Laurence Housman

- Original language: English
- Written by: Laurence Housman
- Characters: Queen Victoria; Prince Albert of Saxe-Coburg and Gotha; Princess Victoria of Saxe-Coburg-Saalfeld
- Genre: biography

Victoria Regina is a 1934 play by Laurence Housman about Queen Victoria, staged privately in London in 1935, produced on Broadway in 1935, and given its British public premiere in 1937.

== Background ==
There was a ban on personations of Victoria in public theatres in Britain, and the play was first given at the Gate Theatre, London in May 1935. The Gate, being a theatre club, was technically private and therefore exempt from the prohibition. In 1936 Edward VIII had the ban revoked, and public performances of the play were possible. The first was in 1937 at the Lyric Theatre, London, where Pamela Stanley repeated her performance in the title role seen at the Gate two years earlier. The play ran at the Lyric for 337 performances.

== 1937 cast ==
- Lord Conyngham – Allan Aynesworth
- Archbishop of Canterbury – Douglas Jefferies
- Duchess of Kent – Irma Cioba
- Victoria – Pamela Stanley
- Prince Albert – Carl Esmond
- Prince Ernest – Albert Lieven
- Mr Anson – John Garside
- Lady Muriel – Pamela Henry-May
- Lady Grace – Frances Clare
- Lady in Waiting – Enid Lindsey
- Duchess of Sutherland – Mabel Terry-Lewis
- Lady Jane – Penelope Dudley Ward
- General Grey – Douglas Jefferies
- John Brown – James Woodburn
- Earl of Beaconsfield – Ernest Milton

Source: The Times.

== Broadway ==
The play was staged three times on Broadway, New York – between 1935 and 1937, twice at the Broadhurst and in 1938 at the Martin Beck. All three productions featured Helen Hayes as Victoria. A twenty-four year old Vincent Price enjoyed his appearance as Prince Albert in the Broadhurst productions. Hayes as Victoria was recorded on radio in an episode of The Campbell Playhouse.

== Adaptations ==
In 1961, it was adapted by Robert Hartung as a Hallmark Hall of Fame Production and broadcast on NBC. It starred Julie Harris as Victoria, with James Donald as Albert, and Basil Rathbone as Disraeli.

Peter Wildeblood adapted the play as a four-part serial for Granada Television in 1964. This production starred Patricia Routledge as Victoria, Joachim Hansen as Albert, and Max Adrian as Disraeli. This was released on DVD by Network in 2019.

== See also ==
- Victoria Regina (film) - 1961 television adaptation

== Sources ==
- Mander, Raymond; Joe Mitchenson (1963). The Theatres of London. London: Rupert Hart-Davis. OCLC 1151457675.
