= James Donald =

Scottish actor (1917–1993)

- Born: James Robert MacGeorge Donald; 18 May 1917; Aberdeen, Scotland
- Died: 3 August 1993 (aged 76); West Tytherley, Hampshire, England
- Occupation: Actor
- Years active: 1938–1978
- Spouse(s): Ann Donald (?–1993; his death; 1 child)

James Robert MacGeorge Donald (18 May 1917 – 3 August 1993) was a Scottish actor. Tall and thin, he specialised in playing authority figures, particularly military doctors.

== Early life ==
Donald was born in Aberdeen, the fourth son of a Scottish Presbyterian minister. His mother died when he was 18 months old and his father remarried.

Donald grew up in Galashiels and was educated at Rossall School on Lancashire's Fylde coast. He briefly attended McGill University in Montreal but, due to asthma, he transferred to the University of Edinburgh.

Donald originally intended to be a teacher, but seeing Cedric Hardwicke and Edith Evans in The Late Christopher Bean made him decide to be an actor. He began seeing as many shows as possible and studied at the London Theatre Studio for two years. He made his stage debut in 1938 in The White Guard and he began to get work regularly on stage. He appeared in Twelfth Night with Michael Redgrave and understudied John Gielgud in King Lear. He toured the provinces in The Cherry Orchard.

== War service ==
In 1939, Donald tried to enlist but a medical examination classified him as unfit for military service, so he joined ENSA. He played minor roles in several war films, including Alibi (1942), In Which We Serve (1942), Went the Day Well? (1942), San Demetrio London (1943) and The Way Ahead (1944). He achieved fame on stage appearing in Present Laughter by Noël Coward. In 1943 he was signed by MGM.

After The Way Ahead in 1944, the British Army reversed its earlier decision and called up Donald. He joined the RASC before being assigned to British Army Intelligence, where he typed up decoded enemy messages.

== Acting career ==
After the war he resumed his acting career. On stage he was in The Eagle with Two Heads (1947) and You Never Can Tell (1948) In films, MGM loaned him to Gainsborough Studios for Broken Journey (1948). He was also in The Small Voice (1948) and MGM's Edward, My Son (1949).

Donald had great success on stage in The Heiress (1949) with Ralph Richardson, Peggy Ashcroft and Donald Sinden. It led to Laurence Olivier's casting him in a production of Captain Caravallo (1950).

For films, he was Jean Kent's love interest in Trottie True (1949) and supported Jean Simmons in Cage of Gold (1950) and Googie Withers in White Corridors (1951).

Donald had the lead in a comedy Brandy for the Parson (1952) and supported Trevor Howard and Richard Attenborough in Gift Horse (1952). He played Mr Winkle in the 1952 film version of The Pickwick Papers.

He had the lead in The Net (1953) and was cast in his first Hollywood film in MGM's Beau Brummell (1954). The same studio hired him to play Theo Van Gogh in Lust for Life (1956). It was Donald's voice that read aloud the famous letters from the artist, played by Kirk Douglas, to his brother, which formed the narrative backbone of the film.

=== International work ===
He portrayed Major Clipton, the doctor who expresses grave doubts about the sanity of Colonel Nicholson's (Alec Guinness) efforts to build the bridge in order to show up his Japanese captors, in the war film The Bridge on the River Kwai (1957). He spoke the film's final words: "Madness! Madness!"

Donald was in much demand to play supporting roles in action and prisoner-of-war films: The Vikings (1958); Third Man on the Mountain (1959); Group Captain Ramsey, the Senior British Officer in The Great Escape (1963); King Rat (1965), a doctor in a POW camp; and Cast a Giant Shadow (1966). He played a colonel in a comedy The Jokers (1967) and had a part as a heroic scientist in Quatermass and the Pit (1967).

Donald starred in a 1960 television adaptation of A. J. Cronin's The Citadel and appeared regularly in many other television dramas in the UK and US. He starred in two episodes of Alfred Hitchcock Presents directed by Hitchcock himself: "Poison" (from the story by Roald Dahl) and "The Crystal Trench" (based on the story by A.E.W. Mason). In 1961, he played Prince Albert opposite Julie Harris's Queen Victoria, in the Hallmark Hall of Fame production of Laurence Housman's play Victoria Regina, for which he received an Emmy nomination.

He performed Write Me a Murder (1961) on Broadway.

== Later life ==
Later film roles included Hannibal Brooks (1969), The Royal Hunt of the Sun (1969), David Copperfield (1969), Conduct Unbecoming (1975) and The Big Sleep (1978).

== Death ==
Donald retired from acting in part because of a lifelong asthmatic condition. He grew grapes and made wine on his farm in Hampshire. He died of stomach cancer on 3 August 1993 in West Tytherley, Hampshire. He was survived by his wife Ann, and a stepson.

== Filmography ==
Film
Year	Title	Role	Notes
1942	The Missing Million		
1942	One of Our Aircraft Is Missing		Uncredited
1942	Alibi	Barman	Uncredited
1942	In Which We Serve	Doc	
1942	Went the Day Well?	German Corporal	Uncredited
1943	San Demetrio London	Gunnery Control Officer	
1944	The Way Ahead	Private Evan Lloyd	
1948	Broken Journey	Bill Haverton	
1948	The Small Voice	Murray Byrne	
1949	Edward, My Son	Bronton	
1949	Trottie True	Lord Digby Landon	
1950	Cage of Gold	Alan	
1951	White Corridors	Neil Marriner	
1952	Brandy for the Parson	Bill Harper	
1952	Gift Horse	Lieutenant Richard Jennings, No. 1	
1952	The Pickwick Papers	Nathaniel Winkle	
1953	The Net	Professor Michael Heathley	
1954	Beau Brummell	Lord Edwin Mercer	
1956	Lust for Life	Theo Van Gogh	
1957	The Bridge on the River Kwai	Major Clipton	
1958	Alfred Hitchcock Presents	Harry Pope	Season 4 Episode 1: "Poison"
1958	The Vikings	Egbert	
1959	Alfred Hitchcock Presents	Mark Cavendish	Season 5 Episode 2: "The Crystal Trench"
1959	Third Man on the Mountain	Franz Lerner	
1961	Victoria Regina	Prince Albert	
1963	The Great Escape	Group Captain Ramsey "The SBO"	
1965	King Rat	Dr. Kennedy	
1966	Cast a Giant Shadow	Major Safir	
1967	The Jokers	Colonel Gurney-Simms	
1967	Quatermass and the Pit	Dr. Mathew Roney	(Released as Five Million Years to Earth in the US)
1969	Hannibal Brooks	Padre	
1969	The Royal Hunt of the Sun	King Carlos	
1970	David Copperfield	Mr. Murdstone	TV movie
1975	Conduct Unbecoming	The Doctor	
1978	The Big Sleep	Inspector Gregory	(final film role)

== Theatre & stage ==
- "White Guard" (1938)
- "Swords About the Cross" (1938)
- "Weep for the Spring" (1939)
- "Twelfth Night" (1939)
- "King Lear" (1940)
- "Thunder Rock" (1943)
- "The Time of Your Life" (1943)
- "Present Laughter" (1943)
- "This Happy Breed" (1943)
- "The Brothers Karamazov" (1946)
- "The Eagle Has Two Heads" (1947)
- "The Cherry Orchard" (1948)
- "You Never Can Tell" (1948)
- "The Heriress" (1949)
- "Captain Carvallo" (1950)
- "Peter Pan" (1952)
- "Slightly Soiled" (1953)
- "The Dark is Light Enough" (1954)
- "The Gates of Summer"(1956)
- "Face of a Hero" (1960)
- "Write Me a Murder" (1961)
- The Wings of the Dove" (1963)
- "The Doctor's Dilemma" (1963)
- "School for Scandal" (1970)
- "The Marquise" (1971)
- "Emperor Henry IV" (1973)
