= Biography of a Bookie Joint =

- CBS Reports episode
- Narrated by: Walter Cronkite; Jay McMullen
- Original air date: November 30, 1961

Episode chronology
← Previous "Eisenhower on the Presidency: Part 2"	Next → "The Balance of Terror: Can We Disarm?"

"Biography of a Bookie Joint" is an American documentary that aired on November 30, 1961, on CBS under the network's CBS Reports banner. It documented Swartz's Key Shop, an illegal bookmaking establishment located at 364 Massachusetts Avenue in Boston. It was narrated by Walter Cronkite and producer/reporter Jay McMullen.

== Production ==
Filming began as early as May 30, 1961. According to Fred W. Friendly, Swartz's Key Shop was chosen because "there was a prolonged attempt by law agencies to close up this one place". CBS's crew concealed cameras in an apartment across the street. McMullen used an 8mm camera hidden in a lunch box to get footage of bookmakers accepting bets from hundreds of people inside the shop.

== Overview ==
The film showed 10 uniformed officers of the Boston Police Department and one recently retired BPD detective entering the establishment while illegal betting took place. Cameras also captured members of the BPD walking past a burning trash can. One of the bookmakers was filmed leaving the shop around 8:30 AM to drive to his regular job at the Metropolitan District Commission headquarters. On September 29 the shop was raided by members of the United States Department of the Treasury. The shop reopened again a week later. On October 27 it was raided again, this time by members of the Massachusetts State Police.

In addition to footage of the key shop, Biography of a Bookie Joint featured interviews with members of the Internal Revenue Service's intelligence unit, the Massachusetts State Police, and the New England Citizen's Crime Commission. State Representative Harrison Chadwick spoke about the influence bookmakers had on the state legislature. MSP Col. Carl Larson stated that he had informed Boston Police Commissioner Leo J. Sullivan on at least four occasions that illegal gambling was occurring at the key shop. Each time, Sullivan sent back word to Larson that members of his department had visited the shop and found nothing to warrant an arrest.

== Broadcast history ==
CBS elected not to air the program in Boston, Hartford, and Providence due to pending charges against the gamblers. It was rebroadcast nationally and for the first time in New England on March 20, 1963.

== Reaction ==
=== Critical reception ===
George McKinnon of The Boston Globe called Biography of a Bookie Joint "a brilliantly handled documentary, far more intriguing than any TV private eye drama". Jerome Sullivan stated that it may have been "the biggest thing that has hit Boston in 20 years".

Biography of a Bookie Joint was nominated for the Primetime Emmy Award for Program of the Year. It lost to the Hallmark Hall of Fame episode Victoria Regina.

=== Political reaction ===
The day after the program aired, Governor John Volpe announced that he would have a "showdown" with commissioner Sullivan. On December 8, Volpe asked Sullivan for his resignation. Sullivan refused and Volpe hired James D. St. Clair to prepare removal proceedings against Sullivan. Sullivan was brought before the Massachusetts Governor's Council's on charges of neglecting his duty by not ordering an investigation into the officers who were filmed visiting Swartz's Key Shop as well as three unrelated offenses. Sullivan resigned on March 15, 1962, during the hearings on his removal. Following Sullivan's resignation, a number of changes were made to the department. Fiscal control of the BPD and the power to appoint the police commissioner was transferred from the Governor of Massachusetts to the Mayor of Boston. Edmund McNamara was brought in from the FBI to become police commissioner and Quinn Tamm was hired to perform a survey of the department.

Harrison Chadwick was publicly censured by the Massachusetts House of Representatives for his remarks in the film. In 1964 the House voted to reverse its censure.

=== Arrests ===
Abraham Swartz, proprietor of the shop, was fined $1,000 and given a three-month suspended sentence in November 1961. He died on February 26, 1962. Harry Portnoy, principal in the gambling operation, was not arrested because he possessed a federal wagering stamp. He was later convicted of assaulting a U.S. Marshal who attempted to serve him a summons. Michael DiNunzio, a key maker who served as a front for the operation, was fined $1,000 and spent three months in jail. In 1963, DiNunzio was arrested in a raid of gambling operation located in a key shop across the street from Swartz's.
