= An Englishwoman's Love-letters =

1900 novel by Laurence Housman

- Title page for An Englishwoman's Love-letters (1900)
- Author: Laurence Housman
- Language: English
- Genre: Novel
- Published: 1900 (John Murray)
- Publication place: United Kingdom
- Pages: 322
- OCLC: 560081781

An Englishwoman's Love-letters is a 1900 novel by Laurence Housman, initially published anonymously. It was a scandal in its time due to its frankness, which excitement turned to disappointment as the public learned the author was no Englishwoman but Housman. One year later, in 1901, a parody of the book, entitled Another Englishwoman's Love-letters and written by Barry Pain, was published by T. Fisher Unwin.

Winston Churchill wrote a P.S. in a letter of 22 January 1901 to his mother, Lady Randolph Churchill: "I have been reading 'An English Woman's Love Letters' Are all Mothers the same?"
