= Arthur Holch =

American filmmaker

Arthur Everett Holch, Jr. [pronounced Holtsch] (March 13, 1924 – September 23, 2010) was an American television documentary filmmaker whose works in the early days of television covered controversial topics relating to race relations and political issues in the United States. Holch earned an Emmy Award for a 1991 documentary broadcast on HBO documenting the life of a German man who had been a member of the Hitler Youth and then turned against the Nazis.

Holch was born on March 13, 1924, in Omaha, Nebraska. Raised in Denver, he earned his undergraduate degree there from the University of Denver and was awarded a master's degree from the Medill School of Journalism at Northwestern University. During the Korean War, Holch served as a military intelligence officer in United States Army Reserve, stationed in Tokyo. He started in the news field as a reporter at the Rocky Mountain News before heading east. Moving to New York City, Holch was hired by CBS Radio and then for the NBC television network.

Establishing Round Hill Productions for his own independent work, Holch wrote the script for the hour-long documentary Walk in My Shoes which was produced and directed by Nicholas Webster. The film, nominated for an Emmy Award, was broadcast on ABC television in 1961, though some stations in the South pre-empted the show, with a Chattanooga, Tennessee station choosing to air a Billy Graham program in its place. The documentary featured profiles of African American life across social classes in New York City as seen through the eyes of such individuals as taxi divers, comedian Dick Gregory and lawyer-turned-politician Percy Sutton. The New York Herald Tribune credited "Walk in My Shoes" with providing "an infinitely deeper understanding and sense of concern for an appalling American problem" and said it was "one of the finest documentaries ever offered on television". Television critic Jack Gould of The New York Times called Walk in My Shoes "nothing short of an unforgettable visit to the world of the Negro in the United States" providing "a viewer the sobering experience of living for a moment in the Negro's world and sharing the frustration that is his lot" that was captured "to a degree never before achieved in TV documentary".

Heil Hitler! Confessions of a Hitler Youth was a half-hour documentary Holch developed for HBO, which described Alfons Heck who had been a member of the Hitler Youth in his teens and had been a vigorous supporter of Adolf Hitler, but had turned against the Nazis and spoke widely about his transformation. The film won a 1992 Emmy Award for News & Documentary. He also created documentaries about life behind the Iron Curtain which were broadcast on ABC, producing and directing the 1967 film The Beautiful Blue and Red Danube and Cuba: The Castro Generation in 1977. His 1972 work Chile: Experiment in Red documented life under the rule of Salvador Allende.

A resident of Greenwich, Connecticut since 1955, Holch later learned that he came from one of the city's founding families. At the time of his death he was working on Greenwich: The Golden Apple: Big Bucks, Big Names, Big Deals, a book about Greenwich over the past two centuries. Holch died in a hospital in Greenwich at the age of 86 on September 23, 2010, due to heart failure. He was survived by his wife, the former Ellen O'Keefe Hare, as well as by four daughters, three sons, and seven grandchildren.
