= Florence Slocomb =

American politician

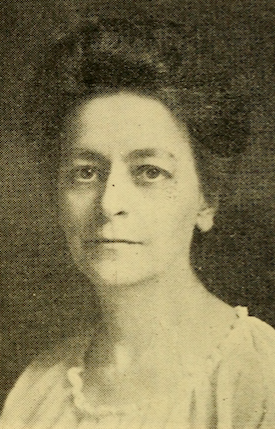

Member of the Massachusetts House of Representatives
- In office 1926–1928
- Constituency: 20th Worcester District

Personal details
- Born: April 26, 1867 Walpole, New Hampshire
- Died: November 11, 1955 (aged 88) Roxbury, Massachusetts
- Resting place: Forest Hills Cemetery, Boston, Massachusetts; 42°17′N 71°06′W
- Party: Republican
- Spouse: George Albert Slocomb
- Parent(s): Rev. Nathan Seaver, Marietta (White) Seaver
- Profession: Teacher and suffragist
- One of the first three women in Massachusetts to be elected to the Massachusetts House of Representatives and the first woman from Worcester to win a state legislative seat.

Florence W. (Seaver) Slocomb (April 26, 1867 – November 11, 1955) was one of the first three women in the Commonwealth of Massachusetts to be elected to the Massachusetts House of Representatives and the first woman from Worcester to win a state legislative seat, representing that district from 1926 to 1928. A longtime suffragist, she was also active in the women's club movement, serving as president of the Ward 8 Republican Woman's Club, the Worcester Women's Club, and the Worcester Smith College Club.

== Formative years ==
Born in Walpole, New Hampshire on April 26, 1867, Florence White Seaver was a daughter of Rev. Nathan Nathan Seaver (1835-1919), a pastor of the Unitarian Church, and Marietta Mills (White) Seaver (1838-1912). Her siblings were Etta Anne Seaver (1869-1934) and William Nathanael Seaver (1877-1960).

Florence Seaver and her sister graduated from Smith College in Northampton, Massachusetts in 1889 and 1892, respectively; their brother, William, graduated from Harvard University in June 1900.

On July 16, 1895, Florence W. Seaver wed George Albert Slocomb (1857-1938), MD, a physician in Springfield, Massachusetts who was a son of Christopher Slocomb and Harriet (King) Slocomb. The ceremony took place in Leicester, Massachusetts. Marriage records confirm that Florence Seaver was a teacher in Walpole, New Hampshire at the time of her marriage.

== Political career and suffrage work ==
In 1889, she was appointed to the Massachusetts State Republican Committee to represent the first senatorial district. She was also reported by The Smith Alumnae Quarterly as being "a member of the Speakers' Bureau" that year who was "speaking widely throughout the state on Republican issues."

One of the first three women in the Commonwealth of Massachusetts to be elected to the Massachusetts House of Representatives and the first woman from Worcester to hold a state legislative seat, she represented the 20th Worcester District from 1926 to 1928, according to her 1955 obituary in The Boston Globe, or the 19th Worcester District, according to an earlier edition of that newspaper. Per a front-page article about her in the November 3, 1926 Globe:

"A woman wielding the power of women and not bothering her head about the men's vote won the election to represent the 19th Worcester District in the General Court.

Mrs. Florence Seaver Slocomb, the first woman Legislator from Worcester, attributes her victory to her women supporters, efficiently organized.... Her campaign committee was composed of women, 60 members of the Women's Republican Club. She reached every Republican woman in the district by phone or person and every Democratic woman by letter. A number of the Democratic women became her hardest workers. Through the women she expected to reach the men. One woman has often meant five votes, says Mrs. Slocomb....

She stayed at the polls all day checking up on the arrival of voters. A fleet of 25 autos operated by her women's transportation committee went after the tardy Republican housewives. In Mrs. Slocomb's own precinct she got out all but five of the Republican women voters. Her check-off and fetching system operated at every other precinct, according to her carefully laid organization.

At midnight the assurance came she would be Representative-elect, the award of an experience for which she forsook a lifelong anticipation of a trip to Europe....

'I'm a born fighter,' says Mrs. Slocomb, who appears anything but belligerent. 'Let's show them they can't help it, I challenged the Republican women.' And unhesitatingly she chose the long, hard work for the Representative election instead of basking in the sun in Southern France....

'The campaigning has been exhilarating. I am tired now, but I am satisfied. The men didn't expect we could do it....'"

Among the issues that she championed during her tenure was an effort to secure jury rights for women. After losing her bid for reelection, she continued to advocate for women's rights by launching petition drives and speaking publicly regarding suffrage matters.

In addition, she served as the president of the Republican Woman's Club (Ward 8), Worcester Smith College Club and, from 1910 to 1912, president of the Worcester Women's Club.

== Family life and community service ==
Sometime around 1933, she relocated with her husband from Worcester to Cohasset, where she resided for the remainder of her life.

According to her 1955 obituary, she "was long an advocate of woman's suffrage and pure food laws."

She was also an active member of the Unitarian Church, and served on several committees which were part of the National Alliance of Unitarian and Other Liberal Christian Women.

== Death and interment ==
Preceded in death by her husband in 1938, Florence (Seaver) Slocomb died at the age of 88 on Friday, November 11, 1955, in Roxbury, Massachusetts. Funeral services were held at 2 p.m. on Monday, November 14, 1955, in the Lucy Stone Chapel at the Forest Hills Crematorium in Jamaica Plain, Massachusetts. The couple's graves are located on the grounds of the cemetery associated with that crematorium. A resident of Cohasset at the time of her death, she was survived by her brother, William N. Seaver, a resident of Melrose, Massachusetts.
