= Jay McMullen =

American journalist

- Born: Jay Latimer McMullen; April 8, 1921; Minneapolis, Minnesota
- Died: March 10, 2012 (aged 90); Greenwich, Connecticut
- Education: Columbia University
- Occupation: Journalist
- Spouse: Diane (nee Fryburg) McMullen
- Children: Anne McMullen; Diana Lepis

Jay Latimer McMullen (April 8, 1921 – March 10, 2012) was an investigative journalist for CBS News.

== Early years ==
McMullen was born on April 8, 1921, in Minneapolis, Minnesota. He grew up in Cleveland, Ohio. He briefly attended Dartmouth College. After the war, he completed his undergraduate degree at Columbia University (B.S. in 1948).

== Career ==
=== World War II ===
In 1941, McMullen served with the Volunteer Ambulance Corps. In 1943, he enlisted with the United States Army for World War II, with whom he served two years as an Army correspondent for the NBC Radio program, "Army Hour."

=== CBS ===
He joined CBS Radio in 1949 and later switched to television with CBS News.

In 1954, McMullen was awarded for a radio report on adoption titled "Babies, C.O.D."

In 1958, he received the George Polk Award for a story, "Who Killed Michael Farmer," about the murder of a disabled boy by a gang. Edward R. Murrow was the narrator.

In 1961, McMullen made an undercover film, "Biography of a Bookie Joint," which led to the resignation of Boston Police Commissioner Leo J. Sullivan and the demotion of some officers. Using an 8 mm film camera concealed in a lunchbox, McMullen's crew recorded illegal bets being taken in the back room of a key shop. From an apartment across the street, reporters filmed police officers entering and leaving the premises. McMullen and Walter Cronkite were the narrators.

The 1964 CBS Evening News ran a story on illegal mail-order traffic in amphetamines and barbiturates.

In 1967, he received the Hillman Prize for "The Tenement."

McMullen's 1972 undercover film, "The Mexican Connection," won an Emmy award. Posing as a prospective drug buyer, McMullen spent eight months in Mexico documenting how marijuana and opium were smuggled by airplane into the U.S., and was able to capture a deal with his hidden camera and microphone.

He retired from CBS News in 1984.

== Death ==
McMullen died on March 10, 2012, at the age of 90 in Greenwich, Connecticut.
