= Harrison Chadwick =

Massachusetts politician (1903–1993)

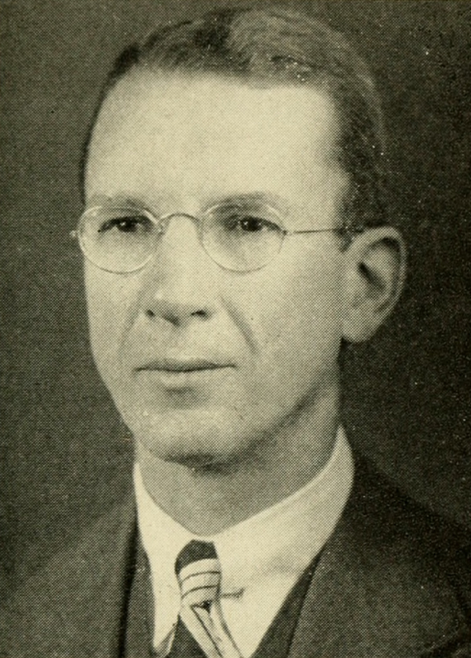

Member of the Massachusetts House of Representatives from the 18th Middlesex district
- In office 1947–1974

Personal details
- Born: February 25, 1903 Winchester, Massachusetts, US
- Died: August 12, 1993 (aged 90) Winchester, Massachusetts, US
- Education: Harvard College (BA)

Harrison Chadwick (February 25, 1903– August 12, 1993) was an American politician who was the member of the Massachusetts House of Representatives from the 12th Middlesex district.
