= Laurence Housman =

English writer and illustrator (1865–1959)

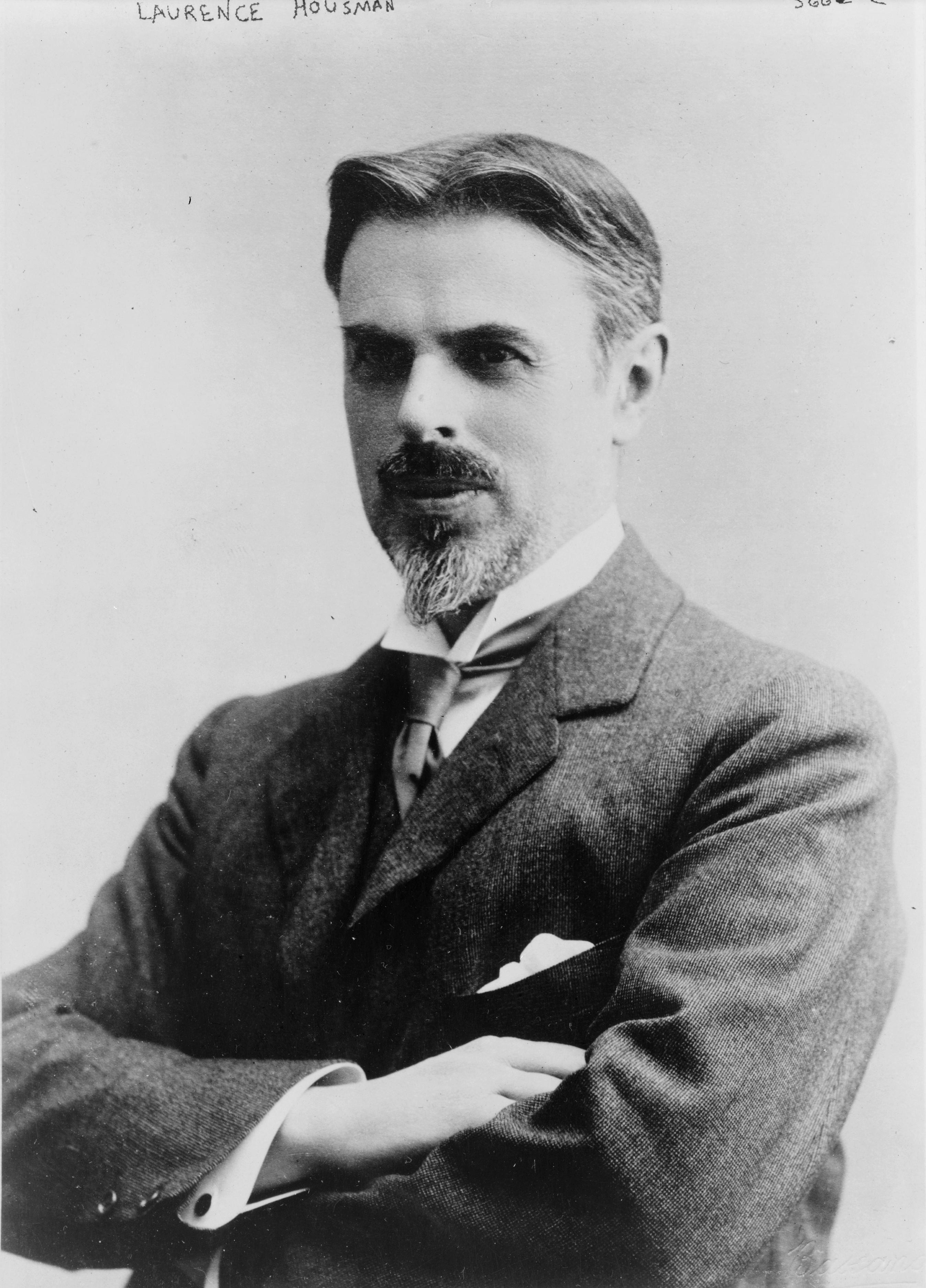
- Photo portrait by George Grantham Bain, 1915
- Born: 18 July 1865; Bromsgrove, Worcestershire, England
- Died: 20 February 1959 (aged 93); Street, Somerset, England
- Education: Lambeth School of Art; Royal College of Arts
- Occupations: Dramatist/playwright, writer, illustrator

Laurence Housman (/ˈhaʊsmən/; 18 July 1865 – 20 February 1959) was an English playwright, writer and illustrator whose career stretched from the 1890s to the 1950s. He studied art in London and worked largely as an illustrator during the first years of his career, before shifting focus to writing. He was a younger brother of the poet A. E. Housman and his sister and fellow activist in the women's suffrage movement was writer/illustrator Clemence Housman.

== Early life ==
Laurence Housman was born in Bromsgrove, Worcestershire to Edward Housman, a solicitor and tax accountant, and Sarah Jane Housman (née Williams). He was one of seven children including an older brother and sister, the classical scholar and poet Alfred E. Housman and the writer and engraver Clemence Housman. In 1871 his mother died, and his father remarried to a cousin, Lucy Housman. Under the influence of their eldest brother, Alfred, Housman and his siblings enjoyed many creative pastimes amongst themselves, including poetry competitions, theatrical performances and a family magazine.

The Housmans suffered increasing financial distress as Edward’s business floundered and he succumbed to drinking and illnesses. Despite this, Housman and his brothers managed to receive an education at Bromsgrove School on scholarships. He and his sister Clemence attended a local art class in 1882, and in 1883 they each received a £200 inheritance, which they used to go to study art at the Lambeth School of Art and the Royal College of Art in London.

== Illustrating ==
He first worked with London publishers by illustrating such works as George Meredith's Jump to Glory Jane (1892), Jonas Lie's Weird Tales (1892), Christina Rossetti's Goblin Market (1893), Jane Barlow's The End of Elfintown (1894) and his sister's novella The Were-Wolf (1896) in an intricate Art Nouveau style. During this period, he also wrote and published several volumes of poetry and a number of hymns and carols.

== Writing ==
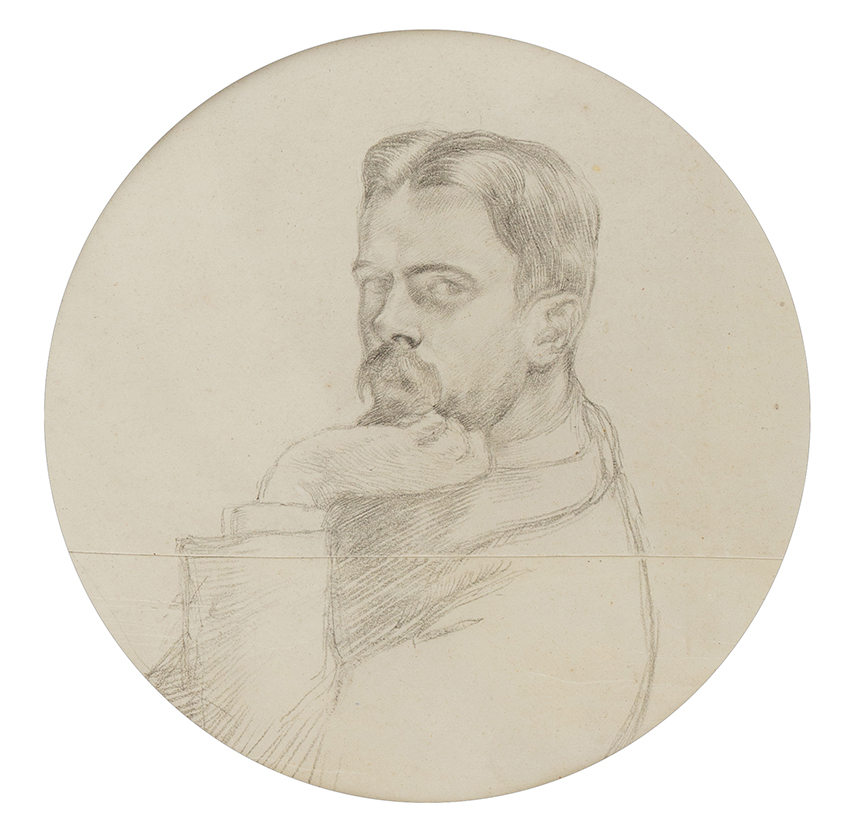
Undated portrait by William Rothenstein (1872–1945)

Housman turned more and more to writing after his eyesight began to fail. His first literary success came with the novel An Englishwoman's Love-letters (1900), published anonymously. He then turned to drama with Bethlehem (1902) and was to become best known and remembered as a playwright. His other dramatic works include Angels and Ministers (1921), Little Plays of St. Francis (1922) and Victoria Regina (1934) which was even staged on Broadway. Housman's play, Pains and Penalties, about Queen Caroline, was produced by Edith Craig and the Pioneer Players.

Some of Housman's plays were scandalous for depicting biblical characters and living members of the Royal House on stage, and many of them were performed only privately until the subsequent relaxation of theatrical censorship. In 1937 the Lord Chamberlain ruled that no British sovereign might be portrayed on the stage until 100 years after his or her accession. For this reason, Victoria Regina could not be staged until the centenary of Queen Victoria's accession, 20 June 1937. This was a Sunday, so the premiere took place the next day.

Housman also wrote children's fairy tales such as A Farm in Fairyland (1894) and fantasy stories with Christian undertones for adults, such as All-Fellows (1896), The Cloak of Friendship (1905), and Gods and Their Makers (1897).

A prolific writer with around a hundred published works to his name, his output eventually covered all kinds of literature from socialist and pacifist pamphlets to children's stories. He wrote an autobiography, The Unexpected Years (1937), which, despite his record of controversial writing, said little about his homosexuality, the practice of which was then illegal.

After his brother's A.E.'s death in 1936, Laurence was made literary executor, and over the next two years brought out further selections of poems from his brother's manuscripts. His editorial work has been deprecated recently: "The text of many poems was misrepresented: poems not completed by Housman were printed as though complete; versions he cancelled were reinstated; separate texts were conflated; and many poems were mistranscribed from the manuscripts."

== Activism ==
=== Suffrage movement ===
Laurence Housman identified himself as a feminist, contributing mainly to the Suffrage movement in England. His activism was largely through works of art such as creating banners, creating propaganda, writing and contributing to women's newspapers. However, he also participated in physical protests, frequently speaking at suffrage rallies. He took part in handing in a petition against force feeding, and was arrested during associated disturbances.

==== The Suffrage Atelier ====
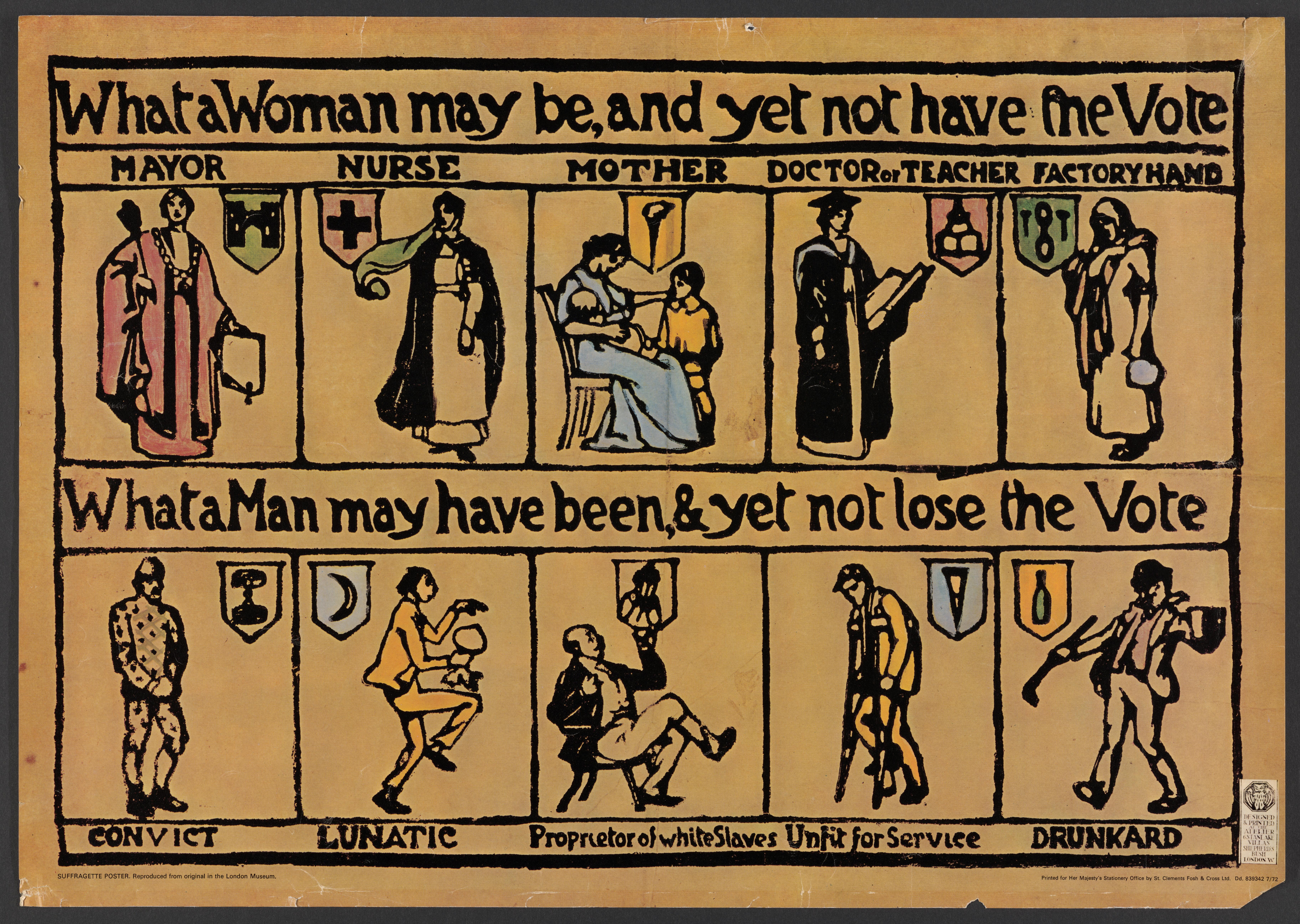
A poster from the Suffrage Atelier, 1913

Laurence Housman and his sister, Clemence Housman, founded the Suffrage Atelier in February 1909. This was a studio that produced artistic propaganda for the suffrage movement. The studio was located at his house, No. 1 Pembroke Cottage Kensington. Although there were other studios throughout England also creating propaganda for the suffrage movement such as the Artists’ Suffrage League and the Women’s Social and Political Union, the Suffrage Atelier was unique because they paid their artists by selling the work to the suffrage community. This studio was important not only in creating propaganda for the suffrage movement but because the creation of banners required collective work. This was significant as it created an environment for women to find other women. Additionally, work such as embroidery, which was known to be domestic, was utilized to propel a political movement and allowed women to earn money.

==== No. 1 Pembroke Cottage Kensington ====
Aside from his Suffrage Atelier studio, Housman opened his house to the suffrage movement and it quickly became a hub for the feminist movement. Along with housing the Suffrage Atelier studio, it additionally held educational classes to help women explore their feminist identities, bringing in public speakers and hosting writing lessons. The house was also used as a safe house on the night of the 1911 census, protecting women participating in the organized Census Boycott.

==== Art and design ====
The Anti-Suffrage Alphabet was a book designed by Housman that incorporated illustrations from several women, including Alice B. Woodward and Pamela Colman Smith, which worked to raise funds for the suffrage campaign. The main goal of the book was to criticize women’s disenfranchisement by mocking negative attitudes towards women.

"From Prison to Citizenship" was the first banner created by Housman as a contribution to the Women’s Social and Political Union. This banner was displayed at the Queen’s hall at an unveiling ceremony and has been used regularly by the Women’s Social and Political Union.

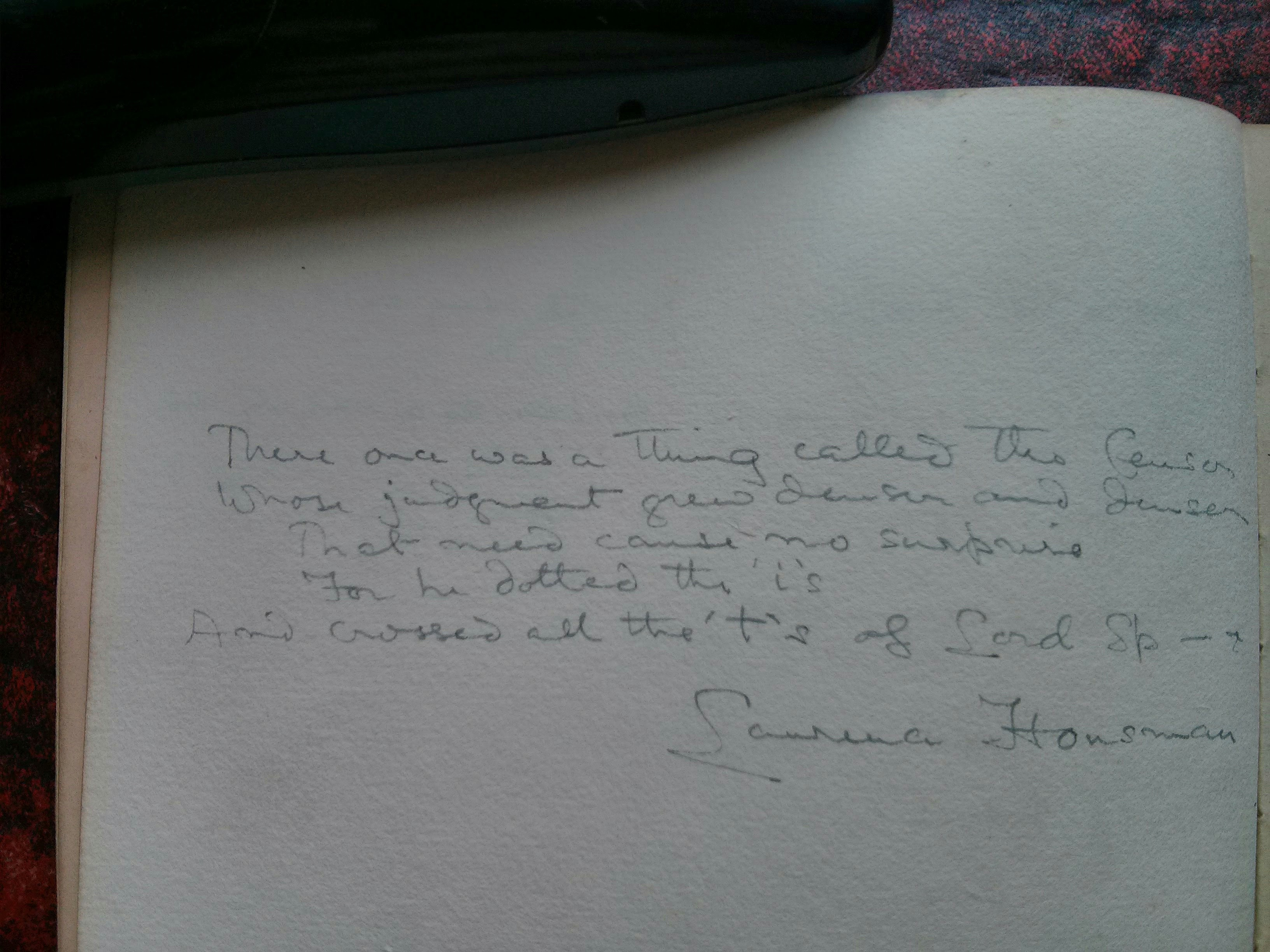
Dedication by Laurence Housman in Mabel Cappers' WSPU prisoners' scrapbook October 1910

==== Writing ====
Housman incorporated his passion for writing in his work with the feminist movement. He was popular for taking other people’s work and giving it a feminist twist. For example, he read “Tommy this Tommy that” by Rudyard Kipling as “Women this Women that” at a Hyde Park rally.

He also contributed to newspapers, advising women on how to protest; his advice can be found in the Women’s Freedom League. Additionally, a series of poems supporting the Suffragette movement was published in The Women’s Press as well as Votes for Women.

In 1911 the Census Boycott, a feminist movement with the goal of disrupting government processes, asked women to refuse to give their information for the census. The movement was advertised by Housman through a series of articles published in The Vote, in which he argued for the reasoning and tactical benefits of the proposal. He also wrote fiction supporting the movement, setting this series in a potential future where the boycott went well.

==== Men’s League for Women’s Suffrage ====
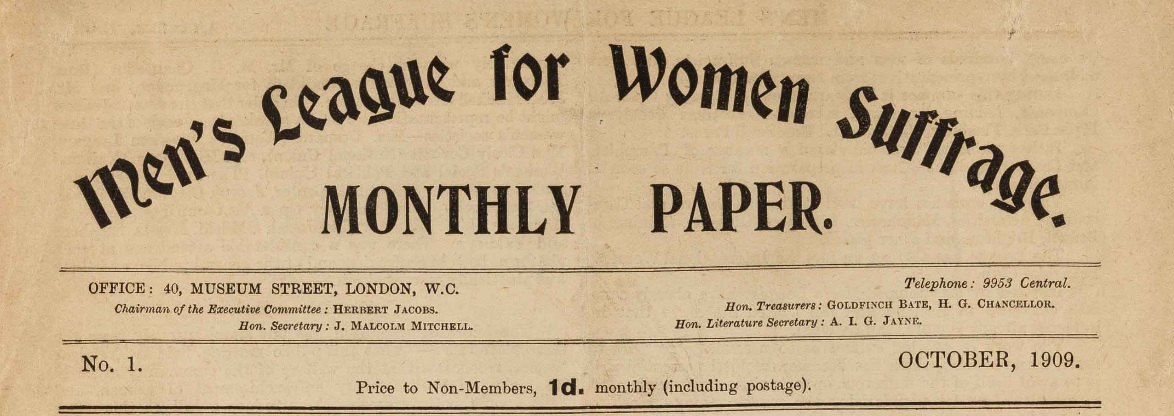
A newspaper published by the Men's League for Women's Suffrage in October 1909

Housman believed men should be an active participant of the suffrage movement. Therefore, Housman along with Israel Zangwill, Henry Nevinson and Henry Brailsford formed the Men’s League for Women’s Suffrage to propel the movement. These four writers were able to successfully convince some men in the 1910 general election to write Vote for Women on their ballot. He was also active in another male feminist group, the Men’s Social and Political Union.

==== Economic beliefs ====
Housman thought economics was a central component working to oppress women. He believed the Suffragettes perceived masculinity to value market values while feminine values leaned to be more utopian and reflect collective values. The Suffrage movement, therefore, centred maternal values, de-individualizing the movement. This, was important as it helped break the stereotype that women, especially mothers, who were active in the movement, were bad citizens.

=== Other activism ===
==== Humanist movement ====
An atheist, though a writer or translator of several hymns (below), Housman was a leading light of the British Ethical and humanist movements in his lifetime. A Vice President of the Ethical Union (today known as Humanists UK), "Housman's humanism was active and lifelong, evidenced by his myriad efforts towards equality and social reform, guided by reason and compassion," to which he donated 40 years of activism. In 1929, he also gave the Conway Hall Memorial Lecture on the topic of ‘The Religious Advance Towards Rationalism’ (using "religious" in the sense of "organised", as in "religious humanism").

Housman attributed his own loss of faith and adoption of humanist beliefs to his strict Victorian upbringing. He said: "It was this sanction of obscurantism... which started the breach between myself and the narrow Conservatism of my upbringing. I could not feel that any social or religious system, which so sedulously refused to tell and to face the truth, deserved respect; and though for a while I still conformed, it was without heart or conviction." Later he opined that many in the Victorian era conformed to Christianity in name only, while acting on "worldly" convictions of right and wrong: "One hears a good deal of talk nowadays about the decay of religion; and the Victorian age is spoken of as though it had been an age of faith. My own impression of it is that it combined much foolish superstition with a smug adaptation of Christianity to social convention and worldly ends."

==== His sexuality ====
Housman was openly homosexual and invested himself to help other homosexuals to be less stigmatized by society. To do so, he joined an organization called the Order of Chaeronea which was a secret society that worked to gain homosexuals social recognition. Additionally, he also was a founder of the British Society for the Study of Sex Psychology. This was an organization which aimed to advance sex reform hoping for a more open society regarding sexualities by breaking prejudices. It was originally known as the British Society of Psychiatry; however, Housman wanted it known as a society and had it changed. Housman also brought his artistic contributions to the fight of de-stigmatizing homosexuality. For example, he created pamphlets for the organization such as The Relation of Fellow-Feeling to Sex.

==== Peace Pledge Union ====
In 1945 he opened Housmans Bookshop in Shaftesbury Avenue, London, founded in his honour by the Peace Pledge Union, of which he was a sponsor. In 1959, shortly after his death, the shop moved to Caledonian Road, where it is still a source of literature on pacifism and other radical approaches to living.

== Later life ==
After World War I, Laurence and Clemence left their Kensington home and moved to the holiday cottage which they had previously rented in the village of Ashley in Hampshire. They lived there until 1924, when they moved to Street, Somerset, where Laurence lived the last 35 years of his life.

== Posthumous recognition ==
His name and picture (and those of 58 other women's suffrage supporters) are on the plinth of the statue of Millicent Fawcett in Parliament Square, London, unveiled in 2018.

== Collections ==
University College London holds c.450 volumes of Housman's works. The collection formed part of the holdings of Ian Kenyur-Hodgkins, an antiquarian bookseller whose material was purchased by the University in 1978.

The Harry Ransom Center at the University of Texas holds an archive of Housman's material which includes manuscripts and correspondence.

== Published writings ==
Source: Open Library list of his works.
This list includes no publications by Housman as illustrator only.

=== Novels ===
- Gods and Their Makers (1897)
- An Englishwoman's Love-letters (1900)
- A Modern Antaeus (1901)
- Sabrina Warham (1904)
- John of Jingalo (1912) — US title: King John of Jingalo
- The Royal Runaway and Jingalo in Revolution: A Sequel to King John of Jingalo (1914)
- The Sheepfold (1918)
- Trimblerigg: A Book of Revelation (1924) — political satire
- Uncle Tom Pudd (1927)
- The Life of H.R.H. the Duke of Flamborough (1928) — political satire

=== Short fiction ===
- A Farm in Fairyland (1894)
- The House of Joy (1895)
- All-fellows (1896)
- The Field of Clover (1898)
- Blind Love (1901) — chapbook; short story later included in Ironical Tales
- The Blue Moon (1904)
- The Cloak of Friendship (1905)
- Stories from the Arabian Nights, Retold by Laurence Housman (1907) — illustrated by Edmund Dulac
- Princess Badoura: A Tale from the Arabian Nights (1913) — illustrated by Edmund Dulac
- Gods and Their Makers and other stories (novel and four stories, 1920)
- Wish to Goodness! (1920) — chapbook; short story later included in Turn Again Tales
- A Thing to be Explained (1920) — chapbook; short story later included in Turn Again Tales
- Moonshine & Clover (1922) — selected from the 1894, 1895, 1898, and 1904 collections
- A Doorway in Fairyland (1922)
- All-fellows and the Cloak of Friendship (1923)
- The Open Door (1925) — chapbook; short story later included in Turn Again Tales
- Odd Pairs: A Book of Tales (1925)
- Ironical Tales (1926)
- Cotton-Woolleena (1930) — chapbook; U.S. title: Cotton-Wooleena; short story included in Turn Again Tales
- Turn Again Tales (1930)
- A Clean Sweep: The Tale of a Cat and a Broomstick (1931) — chapbook
- What-O'Clock Tales (1932)
- What Next? Provocative Tales of Faith and Morals (1938)
- Strange Ends and Discoveries (1948)
- The Kind and the Foolish (1952)

=== Plays ===
- Little Plays of St. Francis: a dramatic cycle from the life and legend of St. Francis of Assisi (1900)
- Followers of St. Francis (1900)
- Bethlehem: A Nativity Play (1902)
- Prunella, or, Love in a Dutch garden (1906; with Harley Granville-Barker)
- The Chinese Lantern (1908)
- Lysistrata: A Modern Paraphrase from the Greek of Aristophanes (1911)
- Pains and Penalties (1911)
- A Likely Story (1916)
- The Lord of the Harvest: A Morality in One Act (1916)
- As Good as Gold (1916)
- The Return of Alcestis (1916)
- The Snow Man (1916)
- Bird in Hand (1916)
- Nazareth (1916)
- The Wheel (1919)
- A Mint o' Money (1920)
- The Death of Orpheus (1921)
- Angels & Ministers: Four Plays of Victorian Shade & Character (1921)
- Possession (1921)
- Brother Sin (1922)
- Sister Gold (1922)
- Brother Sun (1922)
- The House of Bondage (1922)
- Little Plays of St. Francis (1922)
- False Premises (1922)
- Echo de Paris (1923)
- The Death of Socrates: a dramatic scene, founded upon two of Plato's Dialogues, the "Crito" and the "Phaedo" (1925)
- The Comments of Juniper: six plays from the life and legend of St. Francis of Assisi (1926)
- Ways and Means: Five one-act plays of village characters (1928)
- Cornered Poets: A Book of Dramatic Dialogues (1929)
- The New Hangman (1930)
- Palace Plays (1930)
- 20 Selected Little Plays of Saint Francis (1930)
- Ye Fearful Saints! Plays of creed, custom, and credulity (1932)
- The Queen's Progress (1932)
- Victoria and Albert (1933)
- Ashes to Ashes: A Palace Epilogue (1934)
- Four Plays of St. Clare (1934)
- Victoria Regina, a Dramatic Biography (1934) — collection of 30 short plays; illustrated by E. H. Shepard
- Little Plays of Saint Francis, volume III (1935)
- Palace Scenes: more plays of Queen Victoria (1937)
- The Golden Sovereign (1937) — collection of 19 short plays; illustrated by E. H. Shepard
- The Rose and the Thorn (1938)
- The Six o'Clock Call (1938)
- The Bed-chamber Plot (1938)
- The Queen! God bless Her! (1938)
- 'A great relief' (1938)
- Enter Prince (1938)
- Under Fire (1938)
- Gracious Majesty (1941)
- Palestine Plays (1942)
- Happy and Glorious: A Dramatic Biography of Queen Victoria (1943)
- Samuel, the King-maker (1944)
- The Family Honour (1950)
- Old Testament Plays (1950)

=== Hymns ===
- The Maker of the sun and moon (Christmastide) (New English Hymnal #38)
- Lord God of Hosts, within whose hand (St George's Day) (New English Hymnal #162)
- The Saint who first found grace to pen (St Mark's Day) (New English Hymnal #163)
- Now in holy celebration (Visitation of the BVM, translation) (New English Hymnal #166)
- Mary, weep not, weep no longer (St Mary Magdalene, translation) (New English Hymnal #174)
- When Christ was born in Bethlehem (Holy Innocents' Day) (New English Hymnal #203)
- O Light of light, Love given birth (Epiphany) (The Hymnal 1982 #133)
- O Light of light, Love given birth (Epiphany) (The Hymnal 1982 #134)
- Father eternal, Ruler of creation (Christian Responsibility) (The Hymnal 1982 #573)

=== Verse ===
- Green Arras (1896)
- Spikenard: A Book of Devotional Love-Poems (1898)
- The Little Land: With Songs from Its Four Rivers (1899)
- The Story of the Seven Young Goslings (1899) — illustrated by Mabel Dearmer
- Rue (1899)
- Mendicant Rhymes (1906)
- Selected Poems (1908)
- The New Child's Guide to Knowledge (1911)
- The Heart of Peace, and Other Poems (1918)
- The Love Concealed (1928)
- The Collected Poems of Laurence Housman (1937)
- Hop o'-me-heart: A Grown-Up Fairy Tale (1938)
- Cynthia: A True Love Tale (1947)

=== Translation ===
- Of Aucassin and Nicolette: A Translation in Prose and Verse from the Old French together with Amabel and Amoris (1902)

=== Non-fiction ===
- Arthur Boyd Houghton (collection of art by Arthur Boyd Houghton, 1896)
- Articles of Faith in the Freedom of Women (1910)
- National Art Training (1911)
- Sex-war and Woman's Suffrage: A Lecture Given by Laurence Housman (1912)
- Great Possessions (1915) — chapbook; lecture later included in Ploughshare and Pruning-Hook
- St. Francis Poverello (1918)
- Ploughshare and Pruning-Hook: Ten Lectures on Social Subjects (1919)
- The Rubáiyat of Omar Khayyám (1922) — introduction only
- Dethronements: Imaginary Portraits of Political Characters, Done in Dialogue (1922)
- Echo de Paris (1925) — an account of Housman's last meeting with Oscar Wilde
- Modern Religious Belief (1925)
- The "Little Plays" handbook (1927)
- A Substitute for Capital Punishment (1928)
- The Religious Advance Toward Rationalism: Delivered at Conway Hall, Red Lion Square, W.C.1, on 25 September 1929 (1929)
- The Long Journey: A Tale of Our Past (with C. H. K. Marten, 1933)
- The Unexpected Years (autobiography; 1936)
- My Brother, A. E. Housman (1938)
- What Can We Believe? Letters exchanged between Dick Sheppard and Laurence Housman (1939)
- Autarchy, Internationalism and Common Sense (1940)
- The Preparation of Peace (1941)
- Terrorism by Ordinance (1942)
- Back Words and Fore Words (1945)
- Edward FitzGerald, preface

=== Works edited ===
- The Venture: An Annual of Art and Literature (1903) — edited by Laurence Housman and W. Somerset Maugham
- A.E.H.: some poems, some letters and a personal memoir by his brother Laurence Housman (1937)
- War Letters of Fallen Englishmen (1930)
