= Everybody Loves Raymond season 3 =

Everybody Loves Raymond
- Season 3
- DVD cover
- Starring: Ray Romano; Patricia Heaton; Brad Garrett; Madylin Sweeten; Doris Roberts; Peter Boyle
- No. of episodes: 26

Release
- Original network: CBS
- Original release: September 21, 1998 – May 24, 1999

Season chronology
- ← Previous; Season 2 Next → Season 4

The third season of Everybody Loves Raymond ran in the United States on CBS from September 21, 1998, to May 24, 1999.

== Production ==
The third season of Everybody Loves Raymond was produced by HBO Independent Productions, creator Philip Rosenthal's company Where's Lunch, and David Letterman's Worldwide Pants. Patricia Heaton was pregnant with her fourth son during filming of the season, which the producers and directors try to hide, such as with her holding a large telephone book in the season's premiere.

On March 22, 1999, Peter Boyle suffered a heart attack on set; he initially refused to go to the hospital, despite strong insistence from the paramedics, but changed his mind after Rosenthal told the actor he would be liable if Boyle died. While he survived, he would've been dead if he'd arrived at the hospital fifteen minutes later. This resulted in Boyle being absent for three episodes in order to recover. Despite media coverage reporting that he would likely appear in the season finale, this didn't happen. The dance choreography in "Dancing with Debra" was done by Travis Payne, who become popular a year before after choreographing a Gap advertisement. Some content of the season made the airwaves despite disapproval from CBS, such as the use of the word "ass" in "Big Shots" and the entirety of "Halloween Candy".

== Cast ==
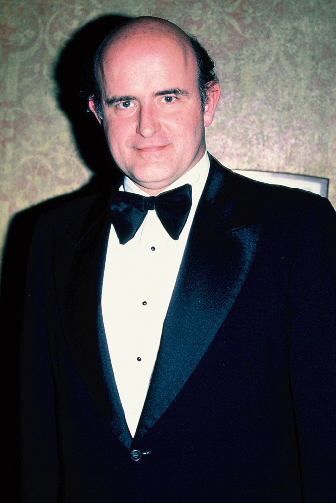
Peter Boyle had a heart attack that led him to miss the shooting of three episodes of the season.

=== Main ===
- Ray Romano as Raymond "Ray" Barone
- Patricia Heaton as Debra (née Whelan) Barone
- Brad Garrett as Robert Barone
- Doris Roberts as Marie Barone
- Peter Boyle as Francis "Frank" Barone
- Madylin Sweeten as Alexandra "Ally" Barone
- Sawyer Sweeten as Geoffrey Barone
- Sullivan Sweeten as Michael Barone

=== Recurring ===
- Monica Horan as Amy McDougall
- Andy Kindler as Andy
- Jon Manfrellotti as Gianni
- Kevin James as Doug Heffernan
- Shamsky II
- Katherine Helmond as Lois Whelan
- Robert Culp as Warren Whelan
- Sherri Shepherd as Judy
- Victor Raider-Wexler as Stan
- Len Lesser as Garvin
- Charles Durning as Father Hubley
- Joseph V. Perry as Nemo
- Tina Arning as Angelina
- John David Conti as Abe Warchiser
- David Hunt as Bill Parker

== Reception ==
=== Ratings ===
Beginning season two, Raymond was in competition with the Fox series Ally McBeal (1997–2002); while media experts expected Ally McBeal to garner better ratings than Raymond through its entire run, this was ultimately not the case. By December 1998, in comparison to the same month of the previous season, the series was 6% higher in its average rating of 10.5 and a 16 share, and 23% with its 18–49 demographic rating of 5.3/13. A June 1999 feature from The New York Times reported the series to be "one of the biggest comedies on television" and also a part of a mainstream television trend of shows without bankable stars becoming hits. "The Sitter" received 363,000 male viewers who were 12 to 17 years old and was the highest-rated non-sports show in the demographic that week.

=== Reviews ===
Everybody Loves Raymond topped Entertainment Weekly's list of the best series of 1998: "This organic vision of family life as a chain reaction of comic agita is vividly rendered by a flawless ensemble," and the "comedy is rooted in characters as deeply drawn as those of TV’s best dramas." In October 1998, an Omaha World-Herald critic included Everybody Loves Raymond as one of his "shows I would like to watch nearly every night of the week." The State Journal-Register, in the middle of the TV season, claimed the show's third season to be the best of all Raymond years so far, also calling "Halloween Candy" a "particularly funny" episode for the Frankenstein costumes of Frank and Robert.

Reviewing the fall 1998 television season, Chicago Tribune critic Steve Johnson wrote the show was a "deserved hit" for CBS. Everybody Loves Raymond topped Daily Herald critic Ted Cox's list of the best shows of the 1998–99 season: "the family sitcom cut dangerously close to the bone on how and why the family unit is at once so aggravating and enduring. And Brad Garrett established himself as the single funniest man on TV, displaying unexpected range as a physical comedian in two hilarious dance sequences at the beginning and the end of the season." Upon the 1998–99 TV season's closure, The Tampa Tribune named Raymond "a contender for the best sitcom on television, appealing to young and old viewers." The Star Tribune also praised the ensemble acting in the season, and the Hartford Courant called it one of the few "signs of life" in a landscape of series focus on demographics and profits over quality.

Three episodes of the season made The Star-Ledger's unranked list of top ten Everybody Loves Raymond episodes: "Frank's Tribute" for its inclusion of both the "funniest" and "most poignant" sequences of the entire show, "Robert's Date" for Garrett's dancing and date slang, and "How They Met" for being the show's best flashback episode.

=== Awards ===
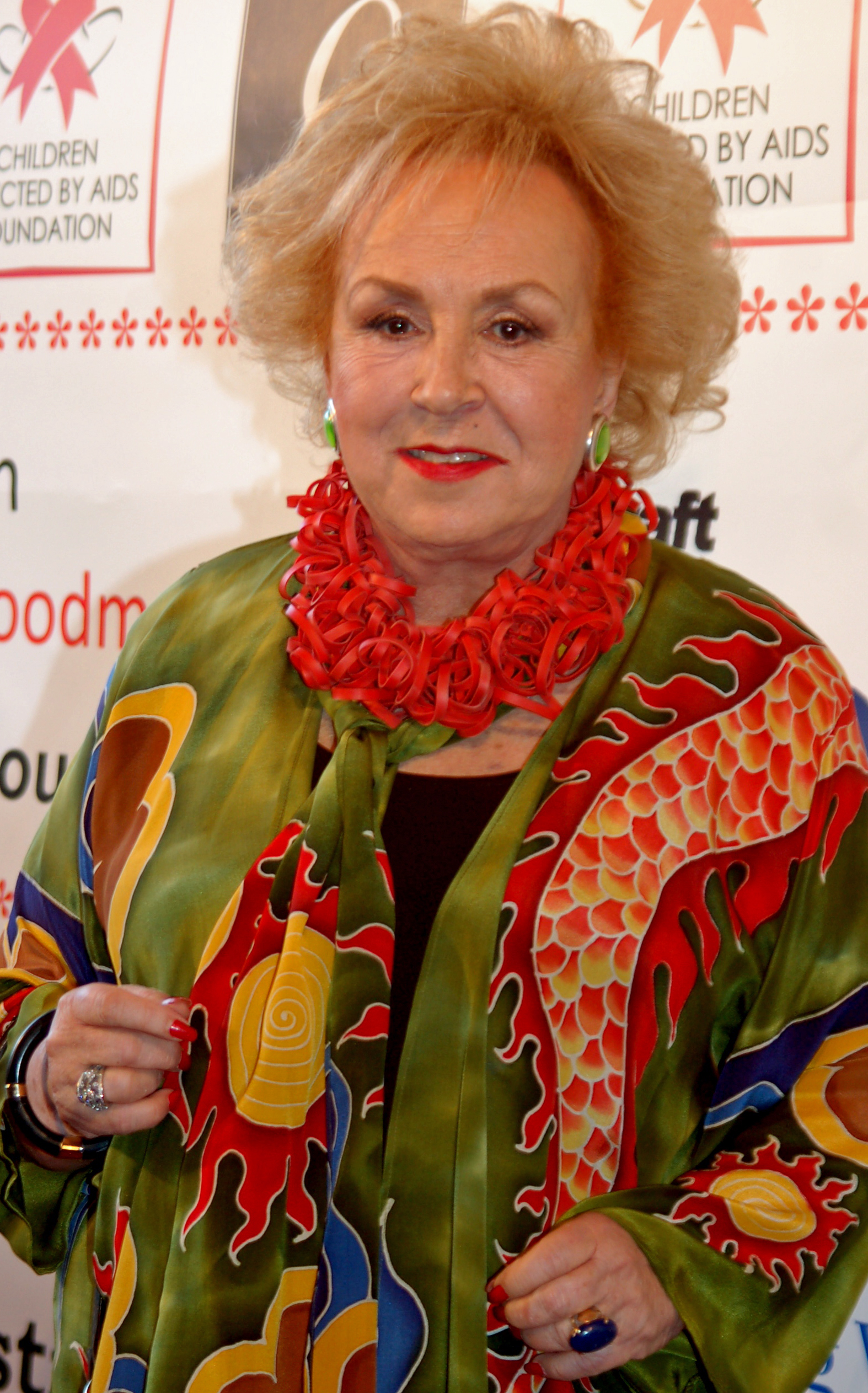
In addition to being nominated for a Primetime Emmy Award for Outstanding Supporting Actress in a Comedy Series, Roberts also won Best Supporting Actress in a Quality Comedy Series by the Viewers for Quality Television for a second year in a row.

Everybody Loves Raymond's third season was the series' first to garner Primetime Emmy nominations. According to The New York Times, "many critics felt [it] had been overlooked in its first two seasons." The show itself was nominated for Outstanding Comedy Series, with acting nominations for Romano for Outstanding Lead Actor in a Comedy Series, Heaton for Outstanding Lead Actress in a Comedy Series, Boyle for Outstanding Supporting Actor in a Comedy Series, and Roberts for Outstanding Supporting Actress in a Comedy Series. Will Mackenzie was nominated for Outstanding Directing for a Comedy Series for his work on "Robert's Date." Patricia Bennett's editing of the episode was also nominated for an Eddie Award for Best Edited Half-Hour Series for Television, while Eric Cohen was nominated for a Humanitas Prize in the 30-minute show category for writing "Frank's Tribute."

In a 1999 ceremony, the season was nominated for six Q awards by the Viewers for Quality Television, such as Best Quality Comedy Series, Best Actor in a Quality Comedy Series for Romano, Best Actress in a Quality Comedy Series for Heaton, Best Supporting Actor in a Quality Comedy Series for Boyle, Best Supporting Actress in a Quality Comedy Series for Roberts, and the same award for Garrett. That year, all of these nominations were the only ones for CBS, and the season tied with The Practice's (1997–2004) second season for the highest amount of nominations that year. Raymond also ended up obtaining the most wins, with the season winning the Comedy Series award, Heaton taking home her Actress award, Romano receiving his Best Actor award, and Roberts winning the Supporting Actress accolade for a second year in a row.

At the fifth Screen Actors Guild Award ceremony, the lead actors were nominated for Outstanding Performance by an Ensemble in a Comedy Series for acting in the season. Madylin Sweeten was nominated for a Youth in Film award for Best Performance in a TV Comedy Series: Supporting Young Actress and a YoungStar Award for Best Performance by a Young Actress in a Comedy TV Series. Roberts also won Funniest Supporting Female Performer in a TV Series at the 1999 American Comedy Awards, Romano nominated for Funniest Male Performer in a TV Series (Leading Role). He also won the honor of Individual Achievement in Comedy at the 15th TCA Awards, the same event that nominated the season not just for Outstanding Achievement in Comedy but also Program of the Year. The season was also nominated for a TV Guide Award for Favorite Comedy Series.

== Episodes ==
No. overall	No. in season	Title	Directed by	Written by	Original release date	Prod. code	U.S. viewers (millions)
48	1	"The Invasion"	Will Mackenzie	Ellen Sandler	September 21, 1998	9801	14.83
When Ray and Debra's house is fumigated for termites, they move in with Frank and Marie. However, when Marie informs Ray that Debra is being intrusive, Debra and Ray team up to teach Ray's parents a lesson by interfering with their lives. Debra cooks her own meals for the family and spoils Marie's. Ray hides the TV remote from Frank and breaks the fridge door. However, despite their efforts, their plan backfires.
49	2	"Driving Frank"	Will Mackenzie	Cindy Chupack	September 28, 1998	9802	14.07
After Frank has another car accident, a fed-up Robert gives him a ticket, which leads Debra to be worried about Frank driving the kids. Ray and Debra then find out that Frank's driver's license is expired since one year after he cuts off a funeral procession. Ray takes Frank for his test, resulting in a harrowing ride for him, and to Ray's astonishment he passes. Debra then reminds him that he is getting old and they can't trust their kids with him anymore. Eventually Frank realizes this himself.
50	3	"The Sitter"	Will Mackenzie	Lew Schneider	October 5, 1998	9803	14.13
After the kids cause chaos at the supermarket, Ray and Debra hire a baby sitter, Lisa, much to Marie's shock and disappointment. At first Ray and Debra think it's a good idea because they are able to spend more time with each other, but when the kids favor Lisa more than Debra, Debra decides to give her up and leave the babysitting jobs to Marie. Marie gets hurt during sitting and Ray tries to get Lisa back, but the Parkers have already hired her. Note: First appearance of Bill and Carrie Parker.
51	4	"Getting Even"	Steve Zuckerman	Steve Skrovan	October 12, 1998	9804	14.37
When Ray embarrasses Debra at a school fundraiser, Debra feels humiliated. When Ray asks her to stop feeling that way, she tells him that she would get back at him. For the next few days Ray becomes very neurotic and finally Debra tells him that she didn't do anything, and just let him imagine everything.
52	5	"The Visit"	Richard Marion	Susan Van Allen	October 19, 1998	9806	14.56
Debra's mother comes to visit, but she seems very detached. When Marie is very helpful during dinner, Debra blurts out that she wants her mother to be more like Marie. This delights Marie and shocks Lois. Ray tries his best to be nice to Lois.
53	6	"Halloween Candy"	Steve Zuckerman	Steve Skrovan	October 26, 1998	9805	14.99
Debra pressures Ray into getting a vasectomy, but Ray has another idea. He buys multicolour condoms and leaves it in the kitchen shelf. They leave Frank alone at the house to give out candy, while they take the kids out for Trick or Treat. When Frank runs out of candy sooner than expected due to snacking on some himself, he gives out the coloured condoms by mistake, which embarrasses Ray and Debra.
54	7	"Moving Out"	Will Mackenzie	Tucker Cawley	November 2, 1998	9807	14.60
Robert moves out of Marie and Frank's house to get some privacy with Amy. When Ray visits Robert’s new home, he notices Robert's landlord's, Rita and Harry, behavior is similar to Marie and Frank's.
55	8	"The Article"	Will Mackenzie	Tom Caltabiano	November 9, 1998	9808	15.68
Andy asks for Ray's feedback on an article he wrote. When Ray gives his comments, Andy is devastated. But when Sports Illustrated publishes the article without any changes, Ray is jealous because he could not get into Sports Illustrated himself. Debra then points out to Ray that he is very self-centered. Robert, Marie and Frank also agree with her.
56	9	"The Lone Barone"	Will Mackenzie	Tom Caltabiano & Jeremy Stevens	November 16, 1998	9809	17.02
When Amy starts decorating Robert's new place he feels pressured to move forward in his relationship. When he comes to Ray for advice, his comments on marriage do not help his fears. When Robert breaks up with Amy, Marie and Debra blame Ray. When Ray tries to fix the issue, Robert clarifies that it was his own decision and Ray is not responsible for the break-up.
57	10	"No Fat"	Steve Zuckerman	Ellen Sandler & Susan Van Allen	November 23, 1998	9810	16.41
When Marie's cholesterol is close to the danger zone, she decides to cook a fat free Thanksgiving dinner (This includes a tofu turkey). Debra convinces the family to be supportive, but when Ray orders a real Thanksgiving meal from a restaurant, all pounce on it. In the end, Marie also joins them.
58	11	"The Apartment"	Steve Zuckerman	Kathy Ann Stumpe	December 7, 1998	9811	15.21
Ray is jealous of Robert's new apartment, where there is a hot tub and many pretty girls. Ray starts visiting Robert often and lies to Debra that Robert is lonely and wants his company. When Debra drops by, she realizes the truth. Meanwhile, Frank turns Robert's old room into a lounge and installs a hot tub.
59	12	"The Toaster"	Steve Zuckerman	Philip Rosenthal	December 14, 1998	9812	15.89
Ray finally gets a gift (an engraved toaster) he thinks everyone will love. Everyone but his parents likes it. When Ray discovers that Frank and Marie have returned it without even looking at it, he feels bad. Marie then tries to get back the toaster Ray gave them, with disastrous results.
60	13	"Ping Pong"	Will Mackenzie	Aaron Shure	January 11, 1999	9814	17.09
Ray discovers that Frank had let him win once in Ping Pong, which Ray wasn't aware of. To prove that Ray can play Ping Pong better than Frank, he challenges him. They get into a match and Frank keeps beating and teasing him. When Frank wins, Ray tells him that he let him win. This makes Frank mad and he finally admits that Ray had actually beaten him.
61	14	"Pants on Fire"	Will Mackenzie	Tucker Cawley	January 18, 1999	9813	18.78
When Ray retrieves a beer bottle cap from the heat vent the day before his birthday, he confesses to a party he had 20 years ago when Marie and Frank were out of town, impressing Frank but angering Marie, who starts to favor Robert, causing tension at Ray’s birthday party. When Robert asks if Marie would be as mad if he had a party, she just assumes that Ray was covering-up for Robert, refusing to hear otherwise and forgives Ray.
62	15	"Robert's Date"	Will Mackenzie	Jeremy Stevens	February 1, 1999	9815	18.04
When Robert's partner Judy confronts him about his plans for the night, he reveals that he has none. She takes him out dancing and he likes it. He goes overboard to fit into her group of friends. When she tries to tell him about it, he thinks that she has started to like him. He takes Ray along to ruin the evening. Meanwhile, Marie thinks that they are dating and tries not to freak out.
63	16	"Frank's Tribute"	Will Mackenzie	Eric Cohen	February 8, 1999	9816	14.53
When Frank wins "Man of the Year" at his lodge, Robert and Ray are asked to make a video about him. When they discover none of his friends have anything nice to say and Frank was elected out of pity, they ask them about chocolate and then edit it out. When Frank sees it, he is disappointed that his lodge buddies lied just to make him feel good, and shows his anger at Ray and Robert instead. Frank and Marie give a tribute to each other.
64	17	"Cruising with Marie"	Richard Marion	Steve Skrovan & Susan Van Allen	February 15, 1999	9817	16.70
When Frank "hurts" his knee, Ray is stuck with going on a cruise with Marie. He keeps eating at all the buffets and Marie gets close to a group of widows. The cruise manager thinks that Ray and Marie are a married couple. Back at home, Frank reveals to Robert that he fakes the injury. Then Frank actually gets hurt and Robert is forced to look after him. Note: Patricia Heaton (Debra Barone) does not appear in this episode due to her maternity leave, making this the only episode she is not in within the entire show.
65	18	"Ray Home Alone"	Steve Zuckerman	Tom Caltabiano & Tucker Cawley & Ray Romano	February 22, 1999	9818	15.12
Debra and the kids leave for the weekend to visit their other grandparents. After his friends leave, Ray finds it difficult to sleep in an empty house, so he goes to Robert's apartment and intrudes on his date. After Robert sends him away, he goes to his parents' place, where he finds Robert. They re-live some of the childhood fears with Marie and Frank. They then try to scare Frank for scaring them as kids, but he foils them.
66	19	"Big Shots"	Steve Zuckerman	Jason Gelles & Mike Haukom	March 1, 1999	9819	15.39
In order to impress Robert at the Baseball Hall of Fame, Ray tries to use his status as a sportswriter to jump to the front of the line to meet the 1969 Mets. Robert wants to wait in the line, but Ray insists on cutting the line. They end up being ejected from the event and Robert does not get the autograph of Art Shamsky in Shamsky II's dog collar. On the journey back, when Ray is pulled over for speeding, Robert tries to bail him out, but fails.
67	20	"Move Over"	Will Mackenzie	Kathy Ann Stumpe	March 15, 1999	9820	18.02
Ray tells Debra he's not sleeping well because of her being too close to him when they're sleeping. He cooks up a story about his granny to get out of touching Debra in a non-sexual way. When Debra learns the truth from Robert, she gets mad. Ray consults Father Hubley over this and he suggests being physically close during the day to avoid the closeness at night. Meanwhile, Ally takes Robert to school for Show-and-Tell.
68	21	"The Getaway"	Steve Zuckerman	Cindy Chupack	April 5, 1999	9821	16.65
When Ray complains about the vacation plan, Debra asks him to pick up a place. They go to a BandB in Vermont. Amy and Debra go shopping and Debra confides in her that she feels that Ray finds her boring. When Marie moves-in for baby-sitting, Robert feels left out and wants to baby-sit instead. Ray then asks Robert, but Marie moves in anyway and supervises in stealth. In the BandB there is no TV and a common bathroom. They clash a lot and end up having a fight in the bathroom.
69	22	"Working Girl"	Michael Zinberg	Cindy Chupack & Kathy Ann Stumpe	April 26, 1999	9823	16.46
Debra decides to go back to her PR job for part-time. She finds a job in Manhattan but gets fired on the very first day. Ray who has trouble looking after the kids is secretly happy. He then feels bad for Debra and gets her job back, but she gets upset with him for interfering. However, she soon realizes his true intentions and apologizes. Marie then applies at Debra’s work to keep an eye on her. Note: This is the first of four episodes in the series in which Peter Boyle (Frank Barone) does not appear; three episodes in season 3 due to suffering a heart attack on set.
70	23	"Be Nice"	Steve Zuckerman	Lew Schneider	May 3, 1999	9822	14.29
Debra and Ray realize they are nicer to strangers than to each other. They decide to be nicer to their own families. But the situation gets awkward when they are just pretend-nice to avoid being honest.
71	24	"Dancing with Debra"	Brian K. Roberts	Aaron Shure & Steve Skrovan	May 10, 1999	9824	15.09
On Ray's suggestion, Robert takes Debra swing dancing and they start to love it. Ray becomes a little jealous and tries to break them up, but gets caught, leaving Debra and Robert shocked that Ray would believe such an absurd thought. Note: This is the second of four episodes in the series in which Peter Boyle (Frank Barone) does not appear.
72	25	"Robert Moves Back"	Brian K. Roberts	Lew Schneider & Aaron Shure	May 17, 1999	9825	15.07
Robert and Amy get back together and spend a night together in Robert's apartment, but the whole building ends up seeing them from their window. Robert is too embarrassed and moves into Ray's basement. While spending another night with Amy, a horrified Marie walks in on them. A semi-dressed Robert and Amy try to explain themselves when Debra, Ray and Frank also join them. Amy ends up losing her temper with Marie for being too possessive of Robert.
73	26	"How They Met"	Gary Halvorson	Ray Romano & Philip Rosenthal	May 24, 1999	9826	13.36
A flashback to when Ray and Debra first met. Ray is working as a futon delivery guy and he brings her a futon. After fixing up a date with her, he accidentally sees her naked. Embarrassed, he cancels his date. Later she visits him and asks him over with a false complaint and then offers him food, making it their first official date. Note: This is the third of four episodes in the series in which Peter Boyle (Frank Barone) does not appear.
