= Everybody Loves Raymond season 1 =

Everybody Loves Raymond
- Season 1
- DVD cover
- Starring: Ray Romano; Patricia Heaton; Brad Garrett; Madylin Sweeten; Doris Roberts; Peter Boyle
- No. of episodes: 22

Release
- Original network: CBS
- Original release: September 13, 1996 – April 7, 1997

Season chronology
- Next → Season 2

The first season of the American sitcom Everybody Loves Raymond originally aired on CBS from September 13, 1996, until April 7, 1997, and consists of 22 episodes. Created and run by Philip Rosenthal, the series revolves around the squabbles of the suburban Long Island Barone family, consisting of titular Newsday sportswriter Ray Romano, wife Debra (Patricia Heaton), parents Marie (Doris Roberts) and Frank (Peter Boyle), and brother Robert (Brad Garrett). Madylin Sweeten and her two brothers, Sullivan and Sawyer Sweeten, also star as the children of Ray and Debra.

Produced by HBO Independent Productions, Where's Lunch, and Worldwide Pants, the season features episodes written by Romano, Rosenthal, Jeremy Stevens, Tucker Cawley, Kathy Ann Stumpe, Lew Schneider, Tom Paris, Bruce Kirschbaum, Steve Skrovan, Carol Gary, and Stephen Nathan; and directed by Jeff Meyer, Rod Daniel, Michael Lembeck, Alan Kirschenbaum, Howard Storm, and Paul Lazarus. The season, despite having strong critical support, had incredibly low ratings due to its place in the Friday night death slot, although the show did significantly better once moved to Monday in March 1997. It and the following season were also the only two of the entire series to not receive Primetime Emmy Award nominations, although the first season received four Viewers for Quality Television nominations.

== Production ==
The first season of Everybody Loves Raymond was produced by HBO Independent Productions, creator Philip Rosenthal's company Where's Lunch, and Worldwide Pants, a company owned by David Letterman. Television executives offered Ray Romano several development deals for a sitcom immediately after he performed on Letterman's late-night talk show in the middle of 1995, which led to the creation of Everybody Loves Raymond. With the exception of the pilot shot at Universal City Studios, the season was filmed at Hollywood Center Studios; it was also the only season of the show to be shot there, as all of the later seasons were shot at Warner Bros. Studios.

Rosenthal's first concept for Everybody Loves Raymond's pilot focused on the titular protagonist paying too much attention to his career as a sportswriter over spending time with his family; the second act of the episode depicted him being stuck at home dealing with not only his wife and kids, but also his parents. CBS disliked this premise for being more exposition-based than a "typical episode." It took Rosenthal four more attempts at coming up with the pilot for CBS to give him the go-ahead to write the screenplay.

Two opening sequences are used in for the season: one depicting Ray Barone describing the premise of the show while getting stuck in a playhouse set, and another one of him talking while his family members move behind him on a conveyor belt.

== Cast ==
=== Main ===
- Ray Romano as Raymond "Ray" Barone
- Patricia Heaton as Debra (née Whelan) Barone
- Brad Garrett as Robert Barone
- Doris Roberts as Marie Barone
- Peter Boyle as Francis "Frank" Barone
- Madylin Sweeten as Alexandra "Ally" Barone
- Sawyer Sweeten as Geoffrey Barone
- Sullivan Sweeten as Michael Barone

=== Supporting ===
- Monica Horan as Amy McDougall
- Andy Kindler as Andy
- Kevin James as Kevin Daniels
- Tom McGowan as Bernie Gruenfelder
- Maggie Wheeler as Linda Gruenfelder
- Shamsky II
- Katherine Helmond as Lois Whelan
- Robert Culp as Warren Whelan
- Victor Raider-Wexler as Stan
- Len Lesser as Garvin
- Joseph V. Perry as Nemo
- Tina Arning as Angelina
- Dave Attell as Dave
- Phil Leeds as Uncle Mel
- Jean Stapleton as Alda

== Reception ==
=== Reviews ===
John P. McCarthy of Variety gave the pilot a mixed review, criticizing the lack of "major neuroses, "stellar wit or unique personality" in the lead protagonist; bland direction; "washed-out look;" and the writing not going beyond "domestic pandemonium and squabbles." However, he also praised the performances of the parents, particularly Boyle's "diabolical air." Very early in the season, Ken Tucker wrote that while writing wasn't "top-notch," it had a unique protagonist, "a beleaguered family man, but one who’s happy about it" and "accepting his responsibilities." The Los Angeles Times, reviewing the pilot, claimed the performances indicated a "promising" series, "even though its premise and characters may not wear well with time."

The New York Times reported Everybody Loves Raymond to be CBS's "most critically praised new show of the [1996–97] season." Entertainment Weekly critic Bruce Fretts opined that while it started as a "predictable" and "witty distillation of Romano’s stand-up act," it progressed into a "fascinatingly humane portrait of suburban dysfunction," specifically "the struggle of a grown man trying to separate from his parents and establish his own family." On Rotten Tomatoes, the season holds a 67% "Fresh" rating based on six professional reviews. Jeffrey Robinson, reviewing the season in 2004, wrote, "the plotlines are a little hollow and seem like every other sitcom, but it has a wonderful cast and some hilarious dialogue that really make this series a winner."

Both contemporaneous season reviews and retrospective pieces about the entire series spotlighted the Fruit of the Month Club sequence.

=== Ratings ===
When Everybody Loves Raymond first aired in September 1996, CBS' scheduling strategy was having series with bankable stars perform at times that usually garnered the most viewers. Shows such as the Bill Cosby-starring Cosby (1996–2000), the Ted Danson-starring Ink (1996–97), and the Rhea Perlman-starring Pearl (1996–97) aired new episodes Monday night; this resulted in Everybody Loves Raymond, which starred an unknown Romano with only a first-time showrunner and a production company only associated with Letterman, being put in the Friday night death slot.

During the fall 1996 season, Everybody Loves Raymond ached both in ratings and focus group test scores of episodes rated by 25 members at ASI Research in North Hollywood. With scores often being "average" or "below average," focus group members disliked the unlikeable characters, "thin" stories, lack of a contemporary tinge, and unclear categorization (A December CBS report stated, "If it is to be a family show, people often question 'where are the kids?' and 'why aren't the kids shown more?'"). Recalled test session conductor Lynne Gross, "The comment I remember occurring most often was that it was a one-joke show—nothing but a bunch of mother-in-law jokes." The network tried to persuade Rosenthal to make the show more "hip" and "edgy," but Rosenthal refused.

According to CBS president Les Moonves, the low ratings concerned network executives: "If the show is as good as we think it is, why isn't it improving like a tenth of a rating point every week? Just show me a little tick--that it's heading in the right direction." Nonetheless, CBS had faith the show would be successful in the future; one episode that aired on November 29 gained 24% in ratings, and another special that aired on a Monday did far better than the other episodes." CBS vice president Kelly Kahl stated in a December 1996 interview, "it is outperforming what we had last year in that time period. This is a baby step forward, which is what CBS is aiming for." The New York Times suggested CBS didn't want to cancel to series because doing so would "offend" Letterman, who owned Worldwide Pants, one of the show's production companies; and Heaton explained the series' low budget motivated the network to keep at it.

Following the poor performances of what were supposed to be a popular Monday night series, Everybody Loves Raymond was moved into in the Monday slot in March 1997, playing alongside Cosby. As a result, the series went up to a 12 ranking and doubled its average rating to 12.1, higher than Ink.

=== Awards ===
The first season of Everybody Loves Raymond received four Q award nominations from Viewers for Quality Television: Best Quality Comedy Series, Best Actor in a Quality Comedy Series for Romano, Best Actress in a Quality Comedy Series for Heaton, and Best Supporting Actor in a Quality Comedy Series for Garrett. The show's casting director, Lisa Miller, also received an Artios Award for Outstanding Achievement in Comedy Pilot Casting.

== Episodes ==
No. overall	No. in season	Title	Directed by	Written by	Original release date	Prod. code	U.S. viewers (millions)
1	1	"Pilot"	Michael Lembeck	Philip Rosenthal	September 13, 1996	9601	8.8
Debra Barone is upset with her husband Ray's family's invasive behavior, especially Ray's mother Marie. The elder Barones live across the street and have the habit of bursting in unannounced. When Debra wants to be alone on her birthday, and Ray's family are adamant on attending the party, he tries to make everyone happy by telling his family there will not be a party, but it ends up in a mess.
2	2	"I Love You"	Paul Lazarus	Philip Rosenthal	September 20, 1996	9602	9.9
During dinner with their friends, Bernie and Linda, they witness public display of affection. Later Debra is dying to know why Ray cannot do the same for her as he does not even say, "I love you" anymore. Ray involves his parents and gets everyone upset.
3	3	"I Wish I Were Gus"	Paul Lazarus	Kathy Ann Stumpe	September 27, 1996	9604	8.9
When Ray's uncle Gus dies, his will makes it Ray's job to give the eulogy at the funeral ceremony, as Uncle Gus’s last hope of getting his wish of Ray overcoming his fear of public speaking. Things get no better for Ray when his aunt Alda (Jean Stapleton), Marie’s long-estranged sister, also comes to the funeral. Marie and Alda have a huge fight during the funeral about Ray's wedding and it is up to Ray to patch them up.
4	4	"Standard Deviation"	Jeff Meyer	Steve Skrovan	October 4, 1996	9605	9.3
Robert wants Ray and Debra to take an intelligence quotient (IQ) test as part of a police assignment. Ray becomes neurotic when he discovers Debra is smarter than he is. But Ray and Debra's moods change when they discover that Ray was the one who scored the highest. Later Robert reveals that he was just playing with their self-image for a class of his.
5	5	"Look, Don't Touch"	Jeff Meyer	Lew Schneider	October 11, 1996	9606	9.5
Ray finds himself attracted to a new waitress at Nemo's named Angelina (Tina Arning) and Debra finds out about the so-called "attraction" after Ray accidentally leaves his wallet at the restaurant. She then drags the whole family to Nemo's to meet the waitress.
6	6	"Frank, the Writer"	Paul Lazarus	Tucker Cawley	October 18, 1996	9603	8.8
Frank begins to consider himself a writer after Reader's Digest publishes one of his humorous stories in the "Humor in Uniform" section. He then writes his own column and asks Ray to give it to his editor. Ray must now risk either jeopardizing his career or crushing his father’s newfound happiness.
7	7	"Your Place or Mine?"	Howard Storm	Jeremy Stevens	October 28, 1996	9607	12.8
Ray is babied again when Marie moves in with them after a fight with Frank. Debra, however, upset about the idea of Marie moving in, decides to spend time with Frank.
8	8	"In-Laws"	Alan Kirschenbaum	Philip Rosenthal	November 1, 1996	9608	10.2
Debra's parents, Warren (Robert Culp) and Lois Whelan (Katherine Helmond) visit for a weekend. The Barones and Whelans are polar opposites in everything and when they try to have dinner together in a fancy restaurant, it turns into a complete disaster that pushes Ray to his breaking point due to his in-laws’ bragging and his own parents acting up as usual.
9	9	"Win, Lose or Draw"	Alan Kirschenbaum	Story by : Stephen Nathan & Kathy Ann Stumpe; Teleplay by : Kathy Ann Stumpe	November 8, 1996	9609	9.8
As soon as Debra finds out that Ray lost $2,300 to his father while playing poker at Nemo's with Frank's lodge buddies, she and Marie try to get the money returned.
10	10	"Turkey or Fish"	Michael Lembeck	Tucker Cawley	November 22, 1996	9611	9.0
Debra wants to start her own Thanksgiving tradition by serving fish instead of turkey, but Marie is complaining that she is doing this on her year. Debra tries her best to make sure that the meal is a huge success when she discovers that Marie is rooting for her failure, and inviting more guests to witness it. When Ray puts the fish in the dishwasher and Marie brings her own turkey, Debra loses her cool.
11	11	"Captain Nemo"	Michael Lembeck	Lew Schneider & Steve Skrovan	December 13, 1996	9610	7.1
When Nemo's basketball team performs badly in the Pizza League, the other players elect Robert as their captain. When Robert leaves him out of the second half, Ray is disappointed and jealous of his brother. Debra suggests giving up the team and spending time with the family, and Ray agrees. Robert bosses the team around and they kick him out. Ray becomes their new captain and misses a day out with Debra and the kids. Eventually, Ray quits and Robert joins the opposing team and wins the game for them.
12	12	"The Ball"	Jeff Meyer	Bruce Kirschbaum	December 20, 1996	9613	8.3
When Ray confronts Frank at Christmas about a baseball signed by Mickey Mantle, Frank admits that it is a fake and that he signed it himself. Ray is very hurt and decides never to lie to his kids. His resolution is put to test when Ally asks about Santa Claus. Ray starts to question his beliefs and talks to Frank about it, and is shockingly touched when Frank reveals his true motives for the deception.
13	13	"Debra's Sick"	Michael Lembeck	Stephen Nathan	January 3, 1997	9612	9.62
Debra, Ally and Michael are all sick, and Ray has to take the kids to the doctor. He has a meeting with Terry Bradshaw that he cannot avoid, so he tries to do the interview at the pediatrician's office. There he discovers that he brought Geoffrey to the doctor instead of Michael, forcing Robert to sort out the confusion. Marie drops in to interfere in Debra's life, and gets on her nerves. Frank and Robert follow her and make it worse.
14	14	"Who's Handsome?"	Howard Storm	Carol Gary	January 17, 1997	9614	9.44
When Debra's friend Amy MacDougall (Monica Horan) contributes to Robert's Police Welfare Fund, she and Robert hit it off. When Robert is unsure about going on a date, Debra mentions that he is the most handsome Barone she has met. Ray becomes very insecure about this comment and becomes obsessed with his appearance. Robert begins dating Amy. Ray gets a spray-on tan and a new hairstyle. Debra gets upset with Ray for his obsession with besting his brother. Note: First appearance of Monica Horan as Amy MacDougall.
15	15	"The Car"	Howard Storm	Lew Schneider	January 31, 1997	9615	10.11
After buying the Plymouth Valiant from his father for $462.25, Ray gives the car to Debra. She complains about all the problems with the car and asks him to return it. Later she discovers that Ray wants to keep the car because it is the car in which he first fooled around with a girl in high school - an experience ruined by Robert.
16	16	"Diamonds"	Michael Lembeck	Kathy Ann Stumpe	February 7, 1997	9617	10.02
Ray is shocked to learn that the engagement ring he bought for Debra, with Frank's help, is fake. He comes up with schemes to exchange the ring with a new one. He succeeds and throws out the fake ring. But the tables are turned when Debra announces she had already changed it when she realized it was cheap, replacing the stone with a $15,000.00 gem from one of her ancestors. The couple are forced to go hunting for the ring in the trash. Amy gets Robert a tie with guns for Valentine's Day and he gets her a unique Valentine's Day gift, an iguana because her favorite color is green.
17	17	"The Game"	Jeff Meyer	Tucker Cawley	February 21, 1997	9616	9.30
When the cable goes out, Frank, Marie and Robert come barging into Ray and Debra's house, but their television service is dead as well. The guys all freak out and decide to rent a movie. The women suggest a game and pick up Scruples. Naturally, all hell breaks loose, and tempers only boil over when the cable comes back on and Ray and Debra are subsequently fined because the cable only went out due to an illegal splitter installed by Frank. Note: Jon Manfrellotti appears as the cable guy from Lynbrook Cable. He would later play Ray's friend Gianni for the remainder of the series.
18	18	"Recovering Pessimist"	Jeff Meyer	Steve Skrovan	February 28, 1997	9618	8.96
Robert wins a Perfect Attendance Medal, but Ray's Sports Writer of the Year nomination overshadows it. Ray refuses to enjoy it because he is scared of losing and does not want to raise his expectations. Ray wins, but is still sad. Debra then points out that Ray is a pessimist and proves it. He promises to be more optimistic. He tries to enjoy the promotion that came from the award, but his parents are not helpful. The promotion leads to coverage of a dog-sledge ride in Alaska in extreme temperatures. His pessimism returns and he is truly happy. Katarina Witt and Marv Albert make cameo appearances as themselves, attending the banquet where Ray wins his award.
19	19	"The Dog"	Rod Daniel	Bruce Kirschbaum	March 3, 1997	9619	17.17
A bulldog follows Ray home and he decides to keep it. After Debra's objection he gives it to Robert, because Robert had a bulldog named Shamsky when they were young and Robert had to give him up because of Ray's allergies. Robert gets quite attached to the bulldog and calls him Shamsky II. When the owner comes looking for her pet, Robert is shattered. However, the owner is upset when she sees that Shamsky II has been neutered, and she forces Ray to buy it for $2,000, and he returns it to a delighted Robert.
20	20	"Neighbors"	Jeff Meyer	Jeremy Stevens	March 10, 1997	9620	14.69
Ray presents Frank with a book of hobbies to keep him from disturbing them, but it backfires. Frank then starts disturbing the entire neighborhood with the buzz saw, car alarm, etc. The neighbors come to Ray and Debra's house to discuss the issues and Marie walks into it. They then get upset and Ray feels guilty. Frank and Marie have a small party for the neighbors and patch things up.
21	21	"Fascinatin' Debra"	Jeff Meyer	Story by : Kathy Ann Stumpe & Lew Schneider; Teleplay by : Jeremy Stevens & Tucker Cawley	March 17, 1997	9621	13.75
Dr. Nora Sarrazin (Mary Kay Adams), a radio psychologist comes to interview Debra for a book, but she winds up being more interested in Raymond and his family — which makes Debra falsely believe she is too boring.
22	22	"Why Are We Here?"	Jeff Meyer	Ray Romano & Tom Paris	April 7, 1997	9622	14.33
Debra and Ray think about the time when Debra was pregnant with the twins. The flashback shows them in their old apartment and looking for a new house. Although Ray warns her about his parents, Debra wants to buy a house near Frank and Marie. In the present, Debra is regretting not listening to Ray.
