= Everybody Loves Raymond season 2 =

Everybody Loves Raymond
- Season 2
- DVD cover
- Starring: Ray Romano; Patricia Heaton; Brad Garrett; Madylin Sweeten; Doris Roberts; Peter Boyle
- No. of episodes: 25

Release
- Original network: CBS
- Original release: September 22, 1997 – May 18, 1998

Season chronology
- ← Previous; Season 1 Next → Season 3

The second season of the CBS sitcom Everybody Loves Raymond aired from September 22, 1997, to May 18, 1998.

== Season overview ==
In the premiere season, Everybody Loves Raymond was critically acclaimed and considered to be a quality series by CBS executives. While most of its episodes suffered from low ratings due to being scheduled Friday night, the average ratings doubled when it was moved to Monday in March 1997. CBS renewed Raymond for a second season a month later on April 11, 1997. The second season of Everybody Loves Raymond was produced by HBO Independent Productions, creator Philip Rosenthal's company Where's Lunch, and David Letterman's Worldwide Pants. While the season continues the episodic format and comedy style established in the first season, there are a few minor differences. These include its increased presence of supporting actors such as Kevin James, Andy Kindler, and Monica Horan; and the filming location switching from Hollywood Center Studios to Warner Bros. Studios, also the location of all later seasons. The intro for the second season depicts Romano sitting on a lawn chair while family members fly around him, except Robert.

== Cast ==
=== Main ===
- Ray Romano as Raymond "Ray" Barone
- Patricia Heaton as Debra (née Whelan) Barone
- Brad Garrett as Robert Barone
- Doris Roberts as Marie Barone
- Peter Boyle as Francis "Frank" Barone
- Madylin Sweeten as Alexandra "Ally" Barone
- Sawyer Sweeten as Geoffrey Barone
- Sullivan Sweeten as Michael Barone

=== Supporting ===
- Monica Horan as Amy McDougall
- Andy Kindler as Andy
- Kevin James as Kevin Daniels
- Jon Manfrellotti as Gianni
- Shamsky II
- Tom McGowan as Bernie Gruenfelder
- Maggie Wheeler as Linda Gruenfelder
- Katherine Helmond as Lois Whelan
- Robert Culp as Warren Whelan
- Sherri Shepherd as Judy
- Charles Durning as Father Hubley
- Joseph V. Perry as Nemo
- Tina Arning as Angelina
- Fred Stoller as Gerard
- Phil Leeds as Uncle Mel
- Dave Attell as Dave
- Dan Castellaneta as Bryan Trenberth

== Reception ==
=== Reviews ===
Entertainment Weekly named Raymond the second best series of 1997, claiming "No sitcom enjoyed a better batting average: Every episode has been a home run." In May 1998, Neal Justin of the Star Tribune called Everybody Loves Raymond the "best sitcom" of the 1997–98 season, reasoning that it "hit a great stride in [its] second [year] with likable but flawed characters, crisp dialogue and unpredictable twists." Kevin Baxter of the Los Angeles Times was ecstatic towards Heaton's perform in the season, and gave the finale four-out-of-four stars for being "a sweet, unpredictable and very funny flashback." In a retrospective review, IGN writer Adam Tierney called it "one of the best seasons for one of the better shows of recent TV," although also noted that it "didn't mix things up much from year one."

=== Awards ===
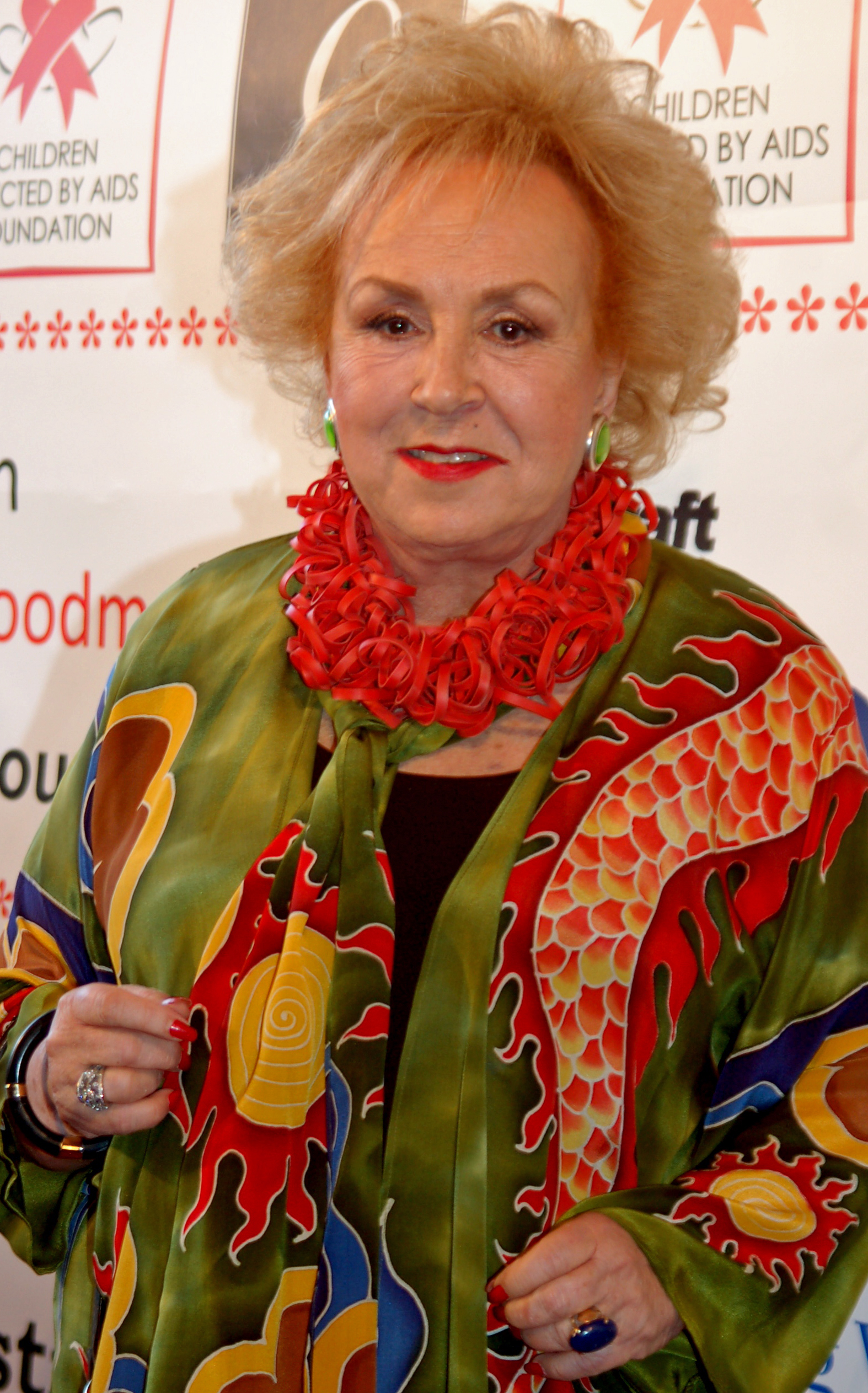
For her acting in the season, Doris Roberts won a Viewers for Quality Television award.

For acting in the season, Madylin Sweeten won a Youth in Film award for Best Supporting Young Actress (Ten or Under) in a TV Comedy Series and a YoungStar Award for Best Young Actress in a Comedy TV Series. The season was also nominated for another Youth in Film award for Best Family TV Comedy Series, losing to Sabrina the Teenage Witch. At the 14th Viewers for Quality Television award ceremony, the season garnered six nominations, tying with Frasier's fifth season for having the second-highest number of nominations; the series also made up most of the nominations CBS garnered, as they only received two more nominations for different shows, Chicago Hope and Dr. Quinn, Medicine Woman. Doris Roberts won one of the nominations, Best Supporting Actress in a Comedy. At the 14th TCA Awards, the season was nominated for Outstanding Achievement in Comedy. The New York Times reported critics being "surprised" the season garnered zero Primetime Emmy Award nominations, a fact that CBS president Les Moonves called the ceremony's "biggest injustice."

== Episodes ==
No. overall	No. in season	Title	Directed by	Written by	Original release date	Prod. code	U.S. viewers (millions)
23	1	"Ray's on TV"	Michael Lessac	Tucker Cawley	September 22, 1997	9701	12.64
Ray is invited to give his views on live television and he is asked about his article on steroids, which does not go very well. His family is excited and they all watch it together. They all initially appreciate him. When he is called on the show again, the family gives him an honest feedback, which makes Ray very conscious on TV.
24	2	"Father Knows Least"	Michael Lessac	Lew Schneider	September 29, 1997	9702	15.30
Ally is having trouble listening and is becoming stubborn, so Ray and Debra take a parenting class. Debra finds it difficult to use the active listening technique on Ally, but Ray is able to catch on. He succeeds when he tries it on Marie and Frank as well as on Ally.
25	3	"Brother"	Michael Lessac	Jeremy Stevens	October 6, 1997	9703	13.12
Robert is feeling lonely on the anniversary of his divorce. Frank and Marie suggest to Ray that he take Robert out to get his mind off it. It turns out to be a good night, until Robert finds out why it happened. Later Ray tells him that he actually loved spending time with him and they make up.
26	4	"Mozart"	Ellen Gittelsohn	Philip Rosenthal	October 13, 1997	9705	14.10
Ally decides to quit her piano lessons and to encourage her not to, Ray asks Marie to revive his own childhood piano lessons so he can play something for Ally. However, Ray remembers very little and this mortifies his mother. However, Marie and Ray soon bond over the lessons and Robert decides to take up drumming again in hopes of bonding with Marie as well.
27	5	"Golf"	Ellen Gittelsohn	Ray Romano & Tom Caltabiano & Kevin James	October 20, 1997	9704	14.13
Ray tricks Debra into letting him play golf, and it gives him an anxiety attack. He is not completely honest with the doctor and he recommends more golf to relax him. Even though Debra is not pleased, she lets him rest and play golf. Later when Ray confesses, Debra gets very mad.
28	6	"Anniversary"	Ellen Gittelsohn	Kathy Ann Stumpe	October 27, 1997	9706	14.62
Frank and Marie have a fight on their 40th anniversary and accidentally let Ray know that they separated for a year while he was young. Then they got back together again when Ray broke his arm in an accident caused by Robert, which bothers Ray, who thinks that he ruined his parents’ life by keeping them together.
29	7	"Working Late Again"	Will Mackenzie	Ellen Sandler & Cindy Chupack	November 3, 1997	9707	14.68
Debra becomes upset with Ray because he is habitually late coming home from work. When Debra catches him having pizza and playing at work, he reluctantly decides to work from home. At home, he starts to make a shambles on the house and allows Frank and Robert to visit regularly, and Debra soon realizes all the goofing off at work was to spare her from misery at home.
30	8	"The Children's Book"	Will Mackenzie	Steve Skrovan	November 10, 1997	9708	14.50
Ray and Debra decide to write a children's book together, but due to creative differences, they do so separately. Ally chooses Ray's story over Debra's, which leads Debra to learn to never ask Ray for help if she ever wants to get something done.
31	9	"The Gift"	Will Mackenzie	Ellen Sandler & Cindy Chupack	November 17, 1997	9709	13.97
Ray forgets to buy Frank a 65th birthday present, so he decides to get him an aquarium (which tops Robert's present of a television remote holder). Frank is thrilled initially with the gift, but soon changes his mind after one of the fish dies. Debra thinks that it is because it reminds Frank of his own death, but Ray later realizes that it was because of the cost of the fish and the aquarium.
32	10	"High School"	Gary Halvorson	Lew Schneider	November 24, 1997	9710	14.31
Debra goes with Ray to his high school reunion. She has a great time with the popular kids, but Ray just sulks. Back at home, Ray reveals that he was never popular in school, unlike Robert. Note: This episode retcons a crossover with The Nanny, where Ray appears in-character at a different high school reunion and was said to be popular.
33	11	"The Letter"	Gary Halvorson	Kathy Ann Stumpe	December 8, 1997	9711	13.23
After Marie ruins her Tupperware party, Debra decides to write Marie a letter telling her how she makes her feel. The letter accidentally gets sent and Frank reads it aloud in front of everyone, leaving Marie upset. Later, Marie and Debra bring everything out in the open and reconcile.
34	12	"All I Want for Christmas"	Jeff Meyer	Steve Skrovan	December 15, 1997	9713	11.28
Ray wants to be romantic with Debra around Christmas time. For a change Debra feels the same way. The family then walks in and ruins the moment. Later Ray suggests to Frank that they take the kids over to their place and everybody starts teasing them. When Ray and Debra are in the bedroom, Robert accidentally breaks their window by flying a remote-controlled USAF toy airplane through it.
35	13	"Civil War"	Gary Halvorson	Tucker Cawley	January 5, 1998	9712	14.91
Ray gets involved in a re-enactment of the Civil War because he feels that Frank asked Robert and not him. He then finds out that Robert volunteered, so Ray himself decides to volunteer, but he discovers that he is to fight for the Confederacy, due to a uniform shortage, whilst Robert and Frank will fight for the Union.
36	14	"Mia Famiglia"	Brian K. Roberts	Ellen Sandler & Cindy Chupack	January 12, 1998	9714	15.20
Ally and Ray write a letter to one of Ray's distant relatives in Italy; Frank’s sister Sarina. Soon, this relative shows up at the Barones' front door. She brings warmth and togetherness to the family until a problem arises — she is not really their relative.
37	15	"Marie's Meatballs"	Brian K. Roberts	Susan Van Allen	January 19, 1998	9715	13.68
Debra wants to learn how to make meatballs the way Marie does. Marie teaches Debra, but secretly sabotages her ingredients setting Debra up for failure. When confronted by Ray, Marie admits to doing it in order to make sure everything "stays right". However, Marie apologizes and passes her recipes on to Debra.
38	16	"The Checkbook"	John Fortenberry	Tom Caltabiano	February 2, 1998	9716	14.02
When Ray is unappreciative of Debra's efforts to maintain a proper checkbook and plan a budget, she asks him to take care of it. He ends up bouncing some important checks and the power is cut-off. He tries to borrow money from Robert and lies to him that Debra has spending issues. When he tries to rectify his mistakes with a fake checkbook and trying to put money in the bank with Robert before Debra realizes the situation, they’re caught by one of Robert’s superiors. Debra then takes over the house finance again. Note: Ray Romano's real brother makes an appearance as the senior officer with Robert and the old lady at the cashpoint.
39	17	"The Ride-Along"	John Fortenberry	Jeremy Stevens	February 23, 1998	9717	14.54
Ray gets more than he bargained for when he accompanies Robert on a "Citizen's Ride-Along" to get a glimpse of what a typical police shift entails – he witnesses Robert halt a robbery at Nemo's. Determined to give Robert recognition, he has his newspaper write a story about it, but things don't go as planned.
40	18	"The Family Bed"	Steve Zuckerman	Steve Skrovan	March 2, 1998	9718	15.05
Ally is having trouble sleeping in her own room, and Debra wants Ray to spend the night in Ally’s bed, but he refuses. Eventually, Ray turns to Marie for help, with disastrous results when Frank barges over as he refuses to sleep without Marie. Finally the entire family ends up in the same bed on Ray’s invitation so Debra will not yell at him.
41	19	"Good Girls"	Joyce Gittlin	Tucker Cawley	March 9, 1998	9719	15.54
Marie reveals why she likes Amy so much: both women are pre-marital virgins. This upsets Debra and Ray tells his mother that Debra was also a virgin until they got married. During a family dinner party, it is revealed that Marie lied; she and Frank engaged in pre-marital relations and held a shotgun wedding due to her pregnancy with Robert.
42	20	"T-Ball"	Jeff Melman	Lew Schneider	April 6, 1998	9720	13.56
Ally is involved in T-Ball and Debra tangles with the event chairman, Bryan (Dan Castellaneta), about approved snacks, and expects Ray to support her. Ray, however, complies with the demands of the snacks and attempts to keep it from Debra.
43	21	"Traffic School"	John Fortenberry	Kathy Ann Stumpe	April 20, 1998	9721	11.69
Robert teaches traffic school to earn some extra cash, but the students disliked his lessons, so he practices his teaching routine on his family. The initial lesson does not go well, so Robert attempts to lighten the mood with ventriloquism. Using the dummy, Robert brings out some of his earlier unsaid feelings about Frank, Marie and Ray.
44	22	"Six Feet Under"	Jeff Melman	Cindy Chupack & Steve Skrovan & Tom Caltabiano	April 27, 1998	9722	13.03
Ray believes that he is shrinking, and immediately believes he is going through a mid-life crisis. He panics and vastly overanalyses the situation, and starts planning his death. Debra then points out that she has already gone through it and planning death is not a solution.
45	23	"The Garage Sale"	Jeff Melman	Ellen Sandler & Jeremy Stevens & Lew Schneider & Tucker Cawley	May 4, 1998	9723	11.74
Frank holds a garage sale to clear out his basement. Ray and Debra help out, but it appears that Ray is not quite ready to part with his baby clothes and crib, as he is not sure that he wants to be done having children. He finally decides he is when the sale ends, but Debra is now beginning to reconsider.
46	24	"The Wedding: Part I"	Jeff Melman	Ray Romano & Philip Rosenthal	May 11, 1998	9724	12.62
Flashback to Ray and Debra's wedding. Ray indirectly proposes to Debra, who happily accepts. Ray, however, begins to wonder if Debra really loves him and if she is marrying him only to have a fancy wedding.
47	25	"The Wedding: Part II"	Jeff Melman	Ray Romano & Philip Rosenthal	May 18, 1998	9725	11.87
When Ray and Debra meet with Father Hubley (Charles Durning) for pre-marital counselling, Ray begins to have second thoughts. Debra yells at him and leaves. At the wedding, Frank attempts to take some of the pressure off of Ray by encouraging him to drink whiskey before the ceremony. Ray is too jubilant throughout the wedding. When Debra thinks he is drunk, he reveals that he never had any whiskey and that he is really very happy.
