= Driving Frank =

- Everybody Loves Raymond episode
- Frank giving a "signal" to another driver during a driving test
- Episode no.: Season 3 Episode 2
- Directed by: Will Mackenzie
- Written by: Cindy Chupack
- Cinematography by: Mike Berlin
- Editing by: Patricia Barnett
- Production code: 9802
- Original air date: September 28, 1998
- Running time: 22 minutes

Episode chronology
| ← Previous "The Invasion" | Next → "The Sitter" |
- Everybody Loves Raymond (season 3)

"Driving Frank" is the second episode of the third season of the American sitcom Everybody Loves Raymond (1996–2005). The series follows the life of Newsday sportswriter Ray Barone (Ray Romano) and his oddball family, which includes wife Debra (Patricia Heaton), parents Frank (Peter Boyle) and Marie (Doris Roberts), brother Robert (Brad Garrett), daughter Ally (Madylin Sweeten), and twin sons Michael (Sullivan Sweeten) and Geoffrey (Sawyer Sweeten). The episode aired on September 28, 1998 on CBS.

== Plot ==
Members of the Barone family, including Ray, Debra, Robert, and Marie, are turned off by grandfather Frank's poor ethics as a driver, which is executed via him driving in police officer Robert's patrol car and cutting off a funeral procession while driving to an arcade named The Happy Zone. Ray and Debra are considering not have Frank drive their kids. Frank then, proudly, reveals he didn't renew his license (that had expired the previous year) because he didn't "want to wait in those long lines and has more hair on his last photo." Ray, with this realization, takes Frank's car keys out of his hand officially revoking his privileges to drive, which he then gives to Marie where she puts them in her bra.

Frank then goes to the DMV to take his driving test, and (as part of a rule where a licensed driver has to ride with a student) Ray goes along with him. On the ride over, Frank fails to look for any oncoming cars, accidentally flipping off a pedestrian, running a stop sign, and having to brake so sudden at a stoplight. Despite encompassing the same driving habits that have turned off his other relatives, he passes the test and gets another license. Although Debra reacts negatively, Ray feels a "little proud" for Frank because it shows that he's "really not that old." This gives both Ray and Debra the realization that they have to be the real "parents" of Frank.

== Reception ==
Upon its airing, "Driving Frank" was the 21st most-viewed episode of the week with a Nielsen rating of 9.9, contributing to a ratings victory CBS had that week. Screen Rant claimed "Driving Frank" to be a great example of Raymond's handling of family dynamics, also noting that it has some "pretty funny situations which include his own son (a police officer) giving him a ticket, in addition to Ray sitting through a particularly rough DMV test with Frank." An extremely favorable December 1998 review from Matt Zoller Seitz of The Cincinnati Post highlighted a scene from "Driving Frank," where Debra says, "[Frank]'s not going to be able to drive forever." Seitz wrote, "Immediately you knew what [Raymond] was really thinking and why he looked so sad. Beneath the word 'drive' lurked the word 'live.' That the show had too much class to spell this out is extraordinary for TV." As of December 2019, it is the seventh highest-rated Raymond episode about Frank on IMDb with a rating of 7.8/10. For acting in "Driving Frank" and "Ping Pong," Peter Boyle was nominated for a Primetime Emmy Award for Outstanding Supporting Actor in a Comedy Series.
