= Frank's Tribute =

- Everybody Loves Raymond episode
- Episode no.: Season 3 Episode 16
- Directed by: Will Mackenzie
- Written by: Eric Cohen
- Cinematography by: Mike Berlin
- Editing by: Patricia Barnett
- Production code: 9816
- Original air date: February 8, 1999
- Running time: 22 minutes

Guest appearances
- Len Lesser as Garvin; Victor Raider-Wexler as Stan; Charles C. Stevenson Jr. as Milt; John David Conti as Abe; T.R. Richards as Guy; Jack Axelrod as Lodge Member; Lou Charloff as Lodge Member; Ancel Cook as Lodge Member; Al Eben as Lodge Member

Episode chronology
← Previous "Robert's Date"	Next → "Cruising with Marie"
- Everybody Loves Raymond (season 3)

"Frank's Tribute" is the 16th episode of the third season of the American sitcom Everybody Loves Raymond (1996–2005). The episode aired on February 8, 1999 on CBS. It was written by Eric Cohen and directed by Will Mackenzie.

== Plot ==
Frank has been named "Man of the Year" at The Lodge, Ray and Robert are asked to make a tribute video about him. They go to the lodge, armed with a camera, to conduct interviews about Frank. When it becomes evident that no one has anything nice to say about Frank (including Stan and Garvin), Ray and Robert realize that Frank was only elected "Man of the Year" out of pity. To keep their father from knowing the truth, they asked the Lodge members about chocolate and then edit "Chocolate" out, replacing it with "Frank Barone". When Frank sees the video however, he becomes angry and storms out of the lodge for home.

Marie tries to talk to Frank about the source of his anger. Frank reveals that he is disappointed that his friends lied to him just to make him feel good. He then asks Marie what she would say in a tribute to him. Marie gives him a heartfelt tribute, which Frank accepts. When Marie asks him what he would say about her in a tribute, Frank balks and could only give her flimsy statements. Hurt and angry, Marie points out Frank's inability to show any love, that he "takes and takes and never gives anything away" and expects everyone to put up with his lazy, snarky attitude. Her final point is "You are surrounded by people who love you anyway… and you push them away. You push all of us away. Well, you don't have to push anymore." Unable to get him to respond, Marie sulks to bed in disappointment (whilst still pointing out that they are still not done with the issue). Frank pretends not to hear her and ends up sleeping in front of the TV. After a while, he wakes up and heads to bed. There, he is confronted by a still cross Marie, who is now wearing over-night facial cream (To which the startled Frank remarks, "A man wants to go to bed and he gets attacked by a Kabuki!"). Marie again demands Frank for a compliment. Frank tries to avoid it by asking to sleep on it. Marie tearfully proclaims, "It's all jokes!" Before lying down and a crying in silence. In an unexpected show of tenderness, Frank goes to the bathroom to wet a towel and proceeds to gently wipe the facial cream off Marie's face. Marie tries to protest, but acquiesces when Frank says, "I like you better without the crap on your face!" The two reconcile in bed.

Sometime later, Ray feels guilty about how the video tribute turned out. Debra, however, thinks that video was great and "it made her hungry" as she happens to be eating a chocolate bar. Ray tries to call his parent to apologize, and is surprised to get an earful from his father. Marie confides in Frank that she wishes that Ray and Debra didn't live across the street - a feeling that Debra had expressed to Ray in previous episodes.

== Reception ==
Upon its airing, "Frank's Tribute" received a mixed review from Virginia Rohan of The Record, who criticized the dramatic tonal shift in its second act and found it "well-acted, but wrenchingly unfunny" overall. However, the episode has been more well-received in later years. It landed in a 2002 unranked list of the top ten best Everybody Loves Raymond episodes by The Star-Ledger, which claimed it had the "funniest" and "most poignant" sequences of the entire show. It was also claimed the second funniest episode of the series by Screen Rant, which highlighted Ray and Robert's tribute video.

As of December 2019, it is the ninth-highest Raymond episode primarily about Frank on IMDb, with a rating of 7.8/10. DVDTalk, in a review of season three of the show, called both "Frank's Tribute" and "Cruising with Marie" "pretty funny and put the characters at the center of some great situations." For writing "Frank's Tribute," Cohen was nominated for a Humanitas Prize in the 30-minute show. Roberts was also nominated for a Primetime Emmy Award for Outstanding Supporting Actress in a Comedy Series for acting in "Frank's Tribute" and "The Toaster."

== Home media ==
On May 3, 2005, all of the third season of Everybody Loves Raymond was released to DVD, including "Frank's Tribute." The episode was also released to Amazon Prime on November 8, 2013 alongside the other season three episodes. It, along with the whole series, was available on Netflix until September 1, 2016.
