= List of Everybody Loves Raymond characters =

The entire Barone family.

This is a list of fictional characters from Everybody Loves Raymond, an American sitcom, originally broadcast on CBS from September 13, 1996, to May 16, 2005.

The show revolves around the life of Italian-American Ray Barone, a sportswriter from Long Island, and his wife, Debra Barone. Other main characters include Ray's parents, Frank and Marie Barone, Ray's children Ally, Michael, and Geoffrey Barone, and Ray's brother Robert Barone, with his wife Amy Barone.

Some of the main characters had crossover appearances in other sitcoms, including The King of Queens, The Nanny, Becker, and Cosby.

== Overview ==
Character	Actor	Seasons								
Character	Actor	1	2	3	4	5	6	7	8	9
Ensemble cast
Ray Barone	Ray Romano	Main	Main	Main	Main	Main	Main	Main	Main	Main
Debra Barone	Patricia Heaton	Main	Main	Main	Main	Main	Main	Main	Main	Main
Marie Barone	Doris Roberts	Main	Main	Main	Main	Main	Main	Main	Main	Main
Frank Barone	Peter Boyle	Main	Main	Main	Main	Main	Main	Main	Main	Main
Robert Barone	Brad Garrett	Main	Main	Main	Main	Main	Main	Main	Main	Main
Ally Barone	Madylin Sweeten	Main	Main	Main	Main	Main	Main	Main	Main	Main
Amy MacDougall	Monica Horan	Recurring	Recurring	Recurring	Recurring	Recurring	Recurring	Recurring	Main	Main
Geoffrey Barone	Sullivan Sweeten	Recurring	Recurring	Recurring	Recurring	Recurring	Recurring	Recurring	Recurring	Recurring
Michael Barone	Sawyer Sweeten	Recurring	Recurring	Recurring	Recurring	Recurring	Recurring	Recurring	Recurring	Recurring
Recurring characters
Bernie Gruenfelder	Tom McGowan	Recurring	Guest		Recurring		Recurring	Recurring	Recurring	Guest
Linda Gruenfelder	Maggie Wheeler	Recurring	Guest		Recurring			Recurring	Recurring	
Suzy	Susan Varon	Recurring	Guest	Guest	Guest	Recurring				
Angelina	Tina Arning	Guest	Recurring	Guest						
Nemo	Joseph V. Perry, Robert Ruth	Recurring	Recurring	Guest	Guest	Recurring				
Mel Barone	Phil Leeds	Guest	Recurring							
Garvin	Len Lesser	Guest		Guest	Recurring		Guest	Recurring	Guest	
Stan	Victor Raider-Wexler	Guest		Guest	Recurring		Guest	Recurring	Guest	
Warren Whelan	Robert Culp	Recurring	Recurring	Guest	Recurring	Recurring	Guest			Guest
Lois Whelan	Katherine Helmond	Recurring	Recurring	Recurring	Recurring	Recurring	Recurring		Guest	Guest
Andy	Andy Kindler	Recurring	Recurring	Recurring	Recurring	Recurring	Guest	Recurring	Recurring	Guest
Doug Heffernan	Kevin James	Guest	Recurring	Recurring						
Shamsky II (dog)	Uncredited	Recurring	Recurring	Recurring						
Gianni	Jon Manfrellotti		Recurring	Recurring	Recurring	Recurring	Recurring	Recurring	Recurring	Recurring
Judy Potter	Sherri Shepherd		Guest	Guest	Recurring	Guest		Recurring		
Father Hubley	Charles Durning		Guest	Guest	Recurring		Recurring			
Gerard	Fred Stoller		Guest		Recurring		Guest	Recurring		
Bill Parker	David Hunt			Guest	Guest		Guest			
Joanne Glotz	Suzie Plakson				Guest	Guest				
Marco Fogagnolo	David Proval					Recurring	Guest			
Stefania Fogagnolo	Alex Meneses					Recurring	Guest			Guest
Peggy Ardolino	Amy Aquino						Guest	Guest	Guest	Guest
Molly Ardolino	Alexandra Romano						Guest	Guest	Recurring	
Hank MacDougall	Fred Willard							Recurring	Recurring	Recurring
Pat MacDougall	Georgia Engel							Recurring	Recurring	Recurring
Peter MacDougall	Chris Elliott (Note: Played by Paul Reubens as "Russel" in Season 4.)							Recurring	Recurring	Recurring

== Main characters ==
=== Ray Barone ===
Ray Barone
- First appearance: "Pilot"
- Last appearance: "The Finale"; The King of Queens – "Raygin' Bulls" (Final character appearance)
- Created by: Ray Romano & Philip Rosenthal
- Portrayed by: Ray Romano
- Number of episodes: 210

In-universe information
- Gender: Male
- Occupation: Sportswriter; Futon repairman (former)
- Family: Frank Barone (father); Marie Barone (mother); Robert Barone (brother); Joe Barone (grandfather); Sal Barone (great-grandfather)
- Spouse: Debra Barone
- Children: Ally Barone (daughter); Geoffrey Barone (son); Michael Barone (son)
- Relatives: Gerard (maternal cousin); Stacey (maternal cousin); Mel (great-uncle); Alda (aunt); Coletta (third cousin); Sarina Barone (great-aunt); Mario Barone (great-uncle); Ciccio Barone (great-uncle); Federico Barone (great-uncle)

Raymond Albert "Ray" Barone (Ray Romano) is the protagonist of the show. He lives on Long Island, with his wife, Debra Barone, and their three children, daughter Ally Barone and twin boys Michael and Geoffrey Barone. The family lives across the street from Raymond's parents, Marie and Frank. Ray attended St. John's University in Queens, New York. He is well-known and well-liked in his community as a result of his profession as a sportswriter for Newsday, later being promoted to chief sports writer. In the early episodes, he is sometimes seen interviewing a famous sportsperson, but this happens less frequently in the later seasons. Due to the nature of his work, Ray is often seen on the couch watching sports, rather than assisting Debra with household duties and the children. His attempts to have sex with Debra are a recurring theme of the show.

Raymond rants in a nasal, whiny voice, but he also wants to be liked by everyone he meets regardless of his reputation in the community, occasionally to the point of appearing neurotic. As a result, he finds it difficult to confront people, especially his mother, Marie.

Parts of his backstory explain Raymond's attitude and personality; as a child, Raymond was spoiled rotten by Marie and had behavioral problems among his peers. His father, Frank, worked long hours and rarely showed him and Robert any forms of affection. Unfortunately, Ray sometimes displays a similar pattern of behavior with his children.

Raymond's laziness and immaturity as a result of his mother's coddling is another major running gag in the show. Very often, to defend himself from Debra during conflicts, he goes to his mother for advice and protection. He is also very scared of her and often sides with her instead of Debra.

Despite him constantly trying to avoid his obnoxious parents who interfere with his life on a daily basis, it is perfectly clear that he still loves and cares for them.

In 2004, TV Guide ranked Ray Barone number 10 on its '50 Greatest TV Dads of All Time' list.

The character has made several crossover appearances:

- 1997: Cosby – "Lucas Raymondicus"
- 1998: The Nanny – "The Reunion Show"
- 1998–2005: The King of Queens (4 episodes)
- 1999: Becker – "Drive, They Said"

Ray Barone made his final character appearance in an episode of The King of Queens that aired after Everybody Loves Raymond ended.

=== Debra Barone ===
Debra Barone
- First appearance: "Pilot"
- Last appearance: "The Finale"
- Portrayed by: Patricia Heaton
- Number of episodes: 209

In-universe information
- Gender: Female
- Occupation: Housewife; Public relations correspondent (former)
- Family: Warren Whelan (father); Lois Whelan (mother); Jennifer Whelan (sister)
- Spouse: Ray Barone (1988–)
- Children: Ally Barone (daughter); Geoffrey Barone (son); Michael Barone (son)

Debra Louise Barone (née Whelan) (Patricia Heaton) is Ray Barone's wife. She was raised by wealthy parents, Lois and Warren Whelan, and grew up in an upper-class background, unlike the other major characters. She has a sister, Jennifer Whelan, who is only seen once in the entire series. Following her graduation from high school, she travelled a lot and dated a few famous sportsmen. Before marrying Ray, she worked in public relations for the New York Rangers hockey team.

Debra is vulnerable and emotionally sensitive. She is sometimes unhappy as a housewife, having to put up not only with Ray's jokes and laziness, but more with his intrusive family members, who very often barge in uninvited, leaving havoc in their wake. Though Ray's parents frustrate her, she rarely shows her feelings to them, resulting in occasional bursts in private of yelling, stomping, and throwing objects. Debra does, however, subject her husband to infrequent bouts of verbal abuse, yelling at and insulting him whenever Ray messes up even over the smallest things. Occasionally, she has also been physically abusive towards him, once shoving him into a bookcase in a fit of rage.

Debra has a feud with her mother-in-law Marie Barone, who shows distrust of her ability to be a mother and a wife. Throughout the series, Debra often finds Robert Barone easily the nicest and friendliest of the Barones, and at times she is shown to get along with Frank Barone, who thinks of her as a daughter and understands Debra's resentment of Marie. Despite the frustration she often holds on Ray's parents, it is evident that she still loves and cares for them, as well as Robert and Ray.

She is also depressed about her parents when they argue, and she is distraught when she finds out they are divorcing. Even though she grew up in a traditional conservative family, she was a free-spirited and a popular teen in her early years. Ray once noted that, during college, she went to Mardi Gras and flashed her breasts to many people who gave her beads and also ended up topless in the newspaper, much to her horror and fury.

The character has also appeared in the King of Queens episode "Dire Strayts".

=== Marie Barone ===
Marie Barone
- First appearance: "Pilot"
- Last appearance: "The Finale"
- Portrayed by: Doris Roberts
- Number of episodes: 210

In-universe information
- Gender: Female
- Occupation: Homemaker
- Family: Alda (sister)
- Spouse: Frank Barone (1957–2006)
- Children: Ray Barone (son); Robert Barone (son)
- Relatives: Ally Barone (granddaughter); Geoffrey Barone (grandson); Michael Barone (grandson); Gerard (nephew); Stacey (niece); Coletta (second cousin)

Marie Barone (née Janella) (Doris Roberts) is the wife of Frank, and matriarch of the Barone family. As a housewife, she excels in household duties, including cooking, cleaning, and keeping and maintaining a good household. She is very nosy, snobbish, and insulting, and has a strong hold over her family, using guilt and a victim complex to get her way. Her penchant for this type of behavior becomes a focal point of many episodes of the show. She has very high self-esteem and regards herself as a positive example of what every wife, mother and woman should be, but is also responsible, at least in part, for much of the misery and conflict within the Barone family. She takes special pride in the family's Italian heritage and even arranges a vacation to Italy for them out of her own savings.

Throughout the series, she is shown to have favorites with certain people, with her younger son, Raymond, being the first and her daughter-in-law, Debra being possibly the last. Other than Frank, nearly everyone has a hard time standing up to Marie due to her ability to make people feel guilty, although Debra does occasionally take a stand. She is well aware of Raymond's reluctance to stand up to her, and in many situations takes advantage of this to achieve her own interests.

It is established in the flashbacks of "How They Met" that she has never liked Debra, even back when Ray and Debra were dating. Marie has never admitted her dislike of Debra outright and is careful about not saying it out loud, but she jumps at most every chance to annoy her or indirectly insult her on many occasions just for her own pleasure.

She has saved a little money on the side every day and admitted to Debra that she collected over $46,000 since her wedding. Marie is also shown to actually control the family's finances in front of Frank, who had always thought he was the one in charge and remained oblivious to much of her savings or expenses.

As her boys were growing up, she spoiled Raymond rotten while mostly allowing Robert to fend for himself. In a later episode, she claims that this was because Robert was able to take care of himself and was independent, in contrast to Ray who was a sensitive, timid, needy little boy (much to Ray's complete shock). For example, in the season 7 episode "The Disclipinarian", Robert remembers how Marie always let Ray play and always put him on chores. However, this was just said to manipulate Robert into getting Amy MacDougall pregnant. Marie then winks to Ray, indicating this is another manipulation. In some cases, however, she is shown to care and be overprotective of Robert as well. This includes when he had nightmares growing up, when his first wife announced her intention to divorce him and Marie threw her out of the house, when he was attacked by a bull on the job, when he was interviewing for an FBI position, and her frequent attempts to get Robert out of the police force in an effort to keep him safe.

Marie is also seen constantly arguing with Frank in nearly every episode, with them constantly fighting and annoying each other. However, in some situations, there have been times when they do evidence their love for one another, despite their reluctance to be open with it. Much to Debra's annoyance, even Debra's parents find them more interesting, since they are honest to each other.

Her catchphrase is "I don't like that, [insert name]." whenever anyone says anything inappropriate.

The final episode reveals that her birthday is December 9 (this was one of Frank's classic "one-liners" as he adds "1802").

The character has also appeared in the King of Queens episode "Rayny Day".

=== Frank Barone ===
Frank Barone
- First appearance: "Pilot"
- Last appearance: "The Finale"
- Portrayed by: Peter Boyle
- Number of episodes: 206

In-universe information
- Gender: Male
- Occupation: Soldier (former); Bookkeeper (retired)
- Family: Joe Barone (father); Sal Barone (grandfather)
- Spouse: Marie Barone (1957–2006)
- Children: Ray Barone (son); Robert Barone (son)
- Relatives: Ally Barone (granddaughter); Geoffrey Barone (grandson); Michael Barone (grandson); Mel (great-uncle); Sarina Barone (aunt); Mario Barone (uncle); Ciccio Barone (uncle); Federico Barone (uncle)

Francis Oscar "Frank" Barone (Peter Boyle) is the husband of Marie Barone and a retired bookkeeper and veteran. In the episode "The Gift" (season 2), it is Frank's 65th birthday, making his year of birth 1932. He can be seen as aggressive, selfish, uncaring, and masculine. Although it is briefly mentioned that he has a sensitive side, Frank refuses to accept it. In episodes like "Pet the Bunny", "Christmas Present", "Fathers Knows Least" and "Frank Goes Downstairs", he indicates that, though capable of patience and kindness, he deliberately cultivates a tough guy persona. However, Frank often proves himself to be a good family man, such as taking the fall for Debra Barone when Marie's prized canister goes missing or even trying to console Robert Barone after he becomes upset from a breakup.

He is almost always seen at Ray Barone and Debra's house on the black armchair with his pants unbuttoned and zipper open watching sports or at home ordering Marie to prepare his meals while sitting and reading the paper. During his sons’ childhood, Frank was virtually absent and had refused to show any sign of affection and love to either boy. He was constantly at odds with his wife Marie concerning how the boys were to be raised. He is very opinionated, outspoken, and has no problem insulting family members and strangers out in the open (this applies in particular to his wife, Marie). He calls men names like "Nancy", "Shirley", "Peaches", and "Mary" when they do not live up to his standards for what it takes to be a man.

Frank is shown to have socially conservative values, particularly regarding minority groups such as gays and lesbians, and ethnic groups such as the Koreans, Chinese and Japanese – he occasionally mutters "Japanese crap" when having trouble with various electronics. He does not follow or accept anything outside the social norms, to which Marie proclaims "Frank lives in blissful ignorance". Despite Marie's constant self-regard, she is accepting of these minority groups. Much to other characters' dismay, Frank is not above engaging in illegal or immoral activities such as gambling, extortion, or stealing cable from Ray.

In his spare time, Frank is a skilled handyman and a history buff, with a particular interest in the American Civil War. He's frequently seen making repairs in Ray and Debra's house, and in "Frank Goes Downstairs" is injured while fixing their staircase. His regular get-away activity is having naked pool bath with his elderly friends at a community center, referred to as "the lodge". On every other Saturday, he takes Raymond's children to The Happy Zone.

Frank survived through World War II and fought in the Korean War. He often uses this as a reference for recounting stories of survival and how he came to be a "man". In one particular incident, where all three Barone men were pretending to go to counselling sessions it was revealed that Ray and Robert had a long line of physically disciplinarian grandparents, with Frank's father, Joe, and his grandfather, Sal, hitting him often. However, Frank vowed to never be physically abusive towards his sons, never enforcing corporal punishment on them and never engaging in anything more than yelling at them.

His main catchphrase on the show is "Holy crap," which is often said after he sees or hears something surprising.

He is outspoken and brutally honest in his relationships with others, and is depicted as the only member of the family who is not only unafraid of Marie, but the only one who will always tell her off, much to the combined relief and horror of the other characters. Many of their arguments revolve around trivial and even irrational subjects, such as who invented the lawn and literally comparing apples and oranges.

They also come into conflict over Debra, whom Frank, unlike Marie, overwhelmingly approves of, and even tends to be more affectionate with than he is with either of his sons. He says to Debra that he sees her as a daughter, as mentioned in “Debra at the Lodge” when he sticks up for her when she comes to help increase membership for the lodge and all of the lodge members start ogling her. True to his blunt personality, in one episode in which the entire family (the adults) were at a counselling session with their Church priest, Father Hubley, he yelled out in front of everyone the main reason why Marie looks down on Debra – "She [Debra] married him [Raymond], and [Marie] still can't deal with it."

=== Robert Barone ===
Robert Barone
- First appearance: "Pilot"
- Last appearance: "The Finale"
- Portrayed by: Brad Garrett
- Number of episodes: 209

In-universe information
- Gender: Male
- Occupation: Police Officer (NYPD)
- Family: Frank Barone (father); Marie Barone (mother); Ray Barone (brother); Joe (grandfather); Sal (great-grandfather)
- Spouses: Joanne Glotz (1993–1995); Amy MacDougall (2003–)
- Relatives: Ally Barone (niece); Geoffrey Barone (nephew); Michael Barone (nephew); Gerard (maternal cousin); Stacey (maternal cousin); Mel (great-uncle); Alda (aunt); Coletta (third cousin); Sarina Barone (great-aunt); Mario Barone (great-uncle); Ciccio Barone (great-uncle); Federico Barone (great-uncle)

Robert Charles Barone (Brad Garrett), called Robbie by Marie Barone, is Ray Barone's older brother by four years (In reality, Garrett is 3 years younger than Romano) and the first-born son of Marie and Frank. His birthday is April 6. At 6 ft 8.5 in (2.045 m), he is the tallest Barone. Robert has several quirks, the biggest being a nervous habit of touching food to his chin before eating it, commonly known as the "Crazy Chin", which he developed to cope with anxiety which started when Raymond was born and all of Marie's attention turned to Raymond. Robert is a loving uncle and still deeply cares for his little brother Raymond. Robert has been a police officer with the NYPD for 27 years, eventually attaining the rank of Sergeant and then, by the end of the series, Lieutenant. His height, appearance and demeanor are the source of much humor, but despite his imposing size, Robert is a very skilled dancer.

After divorcing his first wife, Joanne Glotz, in 1995, Robert moved back in with his parents, became a workaholic, and was acknowledged by the NYPD for not missing one day of work for three years. Robert's advanced skills as a police officer even earned him an interview with the FBI, but Marie intentionally interfered in the interview process. Robert was passed over but simply because the other candidates were more qualified. Once, he was injured on the job when he was gored in the bottom by a bull while breaking up an illegal rodeo. When he returned from his injuries, he briefly left the police force out of a lack of self-confidence, and nearly became a telemarketer. In a later episode, he took a side job as an alarm salesman and considered retiring from the force to join the alarm company full-time. He returned to the NYPD both times, mainly with Raymond's help.

Robert dated his sister-in-law's, Debra Barone's, best friend, Amy MacDougall, for several years, despite a number of breakups. After a bad date with another woman, Robert ran into Amy in a bar and they soon got back together and married in 2003. In 2004, they purchased Frank and Marie's home for $26,000, but had to welcome the elder Barones back in when they were kicked out of a retirement community in New Jersey in the episode "Not So Fast."

In the Season 2 episode "Good Girls", it was revealed that Robert was conceived out of wedlock. His impending birth drove Frank and Marie into marriage. Because of the relatively socially conservative values of the United States in the 1950s which viewed premarital sex as a sin, Frank and Marie planned to lie to friends and family that Robert was two months premature. According to Frank, this was a hard thing to do, as Robert's birth weight was 12 lb (5.4 kg). For the same reason, Robert grew up believing his birthday was June 6 instead of April 6.

Robert is very envious of his brother Raymond, who was favored by their mother, and though Robert is four years older than Ray and much taller, he constantly feels as if he's stuck in Ray's shadow. Despite the obvious favoring of Ray, Marie has claimed that there was never any favoritism. He has a very dark sense of humor and will make fun of Raymond to no end to get a little belated revenge. He is also known for being very passive-aggressive.

While he enjoys taunting Ray himself, Robert is very protective of his younger brother; in one episode, he overheard a radio sports show host insulting Ray at length and publicly berated the man in retaliation. He also respects Ray as a well-meaning, if generally absent, father, in the pattern of Frank. Robert serves as the moral conscience in the family, as the most virtuous of the characters, and often pleads with others when they are considering doing something morally questionable.

Robert's catchphrase in the show is when he finds the family gathered together silent and says: "Is this about me?"

Robert also appears in the King of Queens's episode "Road Rayge".

=== Amy MacDougall ===
Amy MacDougall
- First appearance: "Who's Handsome?"
- Last appearance: "The Finale"
- Portrayed by: Monica Horan
- Number of episodes: 66

In-universe information
- Gender: Female
- Family: Hank MacDougall (father); Pat MacDougall (mother); Peter MacDougall (brother); Russel McDougall (brother)
- Spouse: Robert Barone (2003–)
- Relatives: Judy (aunt)

Amy Louise MacDougall (Monica Horan) is Robert Barone's on-and-off girlfriend, and eventual wife. They met because Amy is Debra Barone's best friend. She and Debra share the same middle name. Although Amy marries Robert in the Season 7 finale "Robert's Wedding", she also appears in the previous seasons. Many issues have caused Amy and Robert to break up in the first six seasons, with one being blamed on Raymond Barone and another happening because Robert was seeing other women, one of whom was his ex-wife. Frequently, Amy apologizes to someone even if she didn't do anything wrong.

She is a bubbly and cheerful woman who was raised in a family of devout Protestants, who live in Pennsylvania. She describes her parents as "people who wouldn't yell if they were on fire." Amy was a virgin when she met Robert, which Ray had a hard time understanding, as Amy was 33 at the time. She eventually lost her virginity to Robert before they were married, but they were spotted having sex by Robert's neighbors, causing them to sign a sheet mandating bedroom curtains in the apartment building.

Like Debra, she also at times gets into conflict with Marie Barone (albeit less frequently). Although she is known for her cheerful personality, she has shown herself to not be afraid to push back against Marie's manipulation. Notable examples of this are found in "Robert Moves Back", "Thank You Notes", and "A Job for Robert".

=== Barone children ===
- Alexandra "Ally" Barone (154 episodes; played by Madylin Sweeten) – Ray and Debra Barone's only daughter. She is six years old at the beginning of the series, and is fourteen by the series finale. She was named after Ray Romano's real-life daughter who made a cameo appearance in the series. In the beginning, she is somewhat mischievous and naughty much like her brothers, but becomes loyal and helpful by the end. However, she still occasionally fibs and mouths off to her parents if she doesn't get what she wants, such as a $250 silk dress which would only be worn once.
- Michael and Geoffrey Barone (130 episodes; played by Sullivan and Sawyer Sweeten respectively) – Ray and Debra's identical twin sons. They are two years old at the beginning of the series and are ten years old by the show's finale. Learning that Debra was pregnant with twins is what prompted Ray and Debra to move out of their apartment and into the house across the street from Frank and Marie. A running joke is Frank Barone's insistence that Geoffrey may have homosexual tendencies, such as when he walks in on the two boys rehearsing to play fairies in a school production. The two are playful, energetic, and prone to causing chaos even without trying but in general are well-behaved. In the pilot episode, they were played by a set of triplets and were called "Gregory" and "Matthew" after Romano's real-life twin sons. Their names were then changed to Geoffrey and Michael respectively.

== Recurring characters ==
Episode count	Character	Actor	Circumstances
26	Andy	Andy Kindler	A fellow sportswriter and friend of Ray's, and a bachelor. He is known to have bad luck with women and is often made fun of for being short and overweight.
25	Gianni	Jon Manfrellotti	A contractor, ex-futon repairman, and friend of Ray's. He briefly dated Amy, much to Robert's consternation, and is disliked by Debra as she considers him immature. He worked with Ray when they were younger. He also appeared on The King of Queens. Manfrellotti first appeared as a cable guy in season 1.
17	Bernie Gruenfelder	Tom McGowan	A married couple, who are friends of Ray and Debra Barone. Ray and Debra request that they become their children's caretakers in the event they die, but Bernie and Linda decline due to Ray's parents. They later talk to Ray and Debra about their experience in marriage counselling. They have one child.
11	Linda Gruenfelder	Maggie Wheeler	A married couple, who are friends of Ray and Debra Barone. Ray and Debra request that they become their children's caretakers in the event they die, but Bernie and Linda decline due to Ray's parents. They later talk to Ray and Debra about their experience in marriage counselling. They have one child.
14	Warren Whelan	Robert Culp	Debra's parents. They are from Connecticut. They are also an upper class couple and have different beliefs from the middle class Barones. Lois and Warren have a huge amount of respect for Marie and Frank Barone to start to imitate them, angering Debra. Lois is a housewife and traveled around on fundraisers. She is friendly and patient, but easily insulted. She acts nervously around Robert, who also acts nervously around her. Warren is a businessman and a caring, happy father. He is very passionate about antiques, and, in a running joke on the show, is often referred to as having a problem with alcohol. Lois and Warren have a struggling relationship and go to marriage counselling in New Jersey. Warren eventually files for a divorce, since neither of them can find love in their marriage any more. Debra is distraught and furious with Lois, believing that she filed it, but Warren later tells her that it was him. Debra believes her parents are getting back together when they are spotted having sex a few years later, but they reassure her that they are staying divorced.
11	Lois Whelan	Katherine Helmond	
13	Hank MacDougall	Fred Willard	Amy and Peter MacDougall's parents who first appear in Season 7. They are devout conservative Presbyterians from Pennsylvania and oppose their daughter's marriage to Robert due to his previous marital status and Catholic faith. This is not helped by the fact that the Barones and MacDougalls are not the most compatible of families, although the Barones have always loved Amy, and the MacDougalls come to accept Robert. Hank is a former professor and now a high school deputy principal. He is known to be opposed to smoking. Pat is a housewife, and has a high-pitched, gentle voice. She is shown to be a protective and loving mother. In the second to last episode of the show, it is revealed Pat has a smoking addiction to Hank's disappointment.
13	Pat MacDougall	Georgia Engel	
10	Peter MacDougall	Chris Elliott	Amy's older brother. He has a strange and psychologically unstable personality and a duplicitous, quick-witted mind. Opposed to his sister's marriage, he insists that he will keep trying to break it up. Peter is single and lives with his pet house cat, Miss Puss. At first, Peter and Robert hate each other, but the two later find common ground in the fact that they both suffered from being the overshadowed older sibling and living with their parents. He is fond of Ray, although the feeling isn't mutual. Peter was originally introduced as "Russell", the owner of a comic book shop (played by comedian Paul Reubens) in a one-time appearance.
9	Garvin	Len Lesser	A friend of Frank's. He is always seen with Stan. Whenever Garvin notices Ray, he shouts, "Hey, Ray's here! Ha-ha-ha!", while shaking his arms in the air. Lesser used a similar gag on Seinfeld when he portrayed Uncle Leo, enthusiastically yelling, "Jerry! Hello!", while holding out his arms every time he greeted his nephew, Jerry.
9	Judy Potter	Sherri Shepherd	Robert's partner on the New York Police Department. She takes him out to a black bar and helps Debra and Marie mend their relationship.
9	Shamsky II	Uncredited	Robert's pet bulldog he keeps after having him neutered and later finding out he was a purebred, used for breeding stock. Shamsky II, named after baseball player Art Shamsky, makes brief cameos in other episodes. In one episode, Robert is seen saying, "Beat it, Shamsky", to order his dog out of the room he is in.
9	Stan	Victor Raider-Wexler	A friend of Frank and Marie's, and the husband of Lee. Stan is almost always seen with Garvin.
6	Kevin Daniels	Kevin James	The announcer for the New York Mets, and a friend and golf buddy of Ray's. He is also the co-host of "Sports Talk with Roy Firestone". Kevin James later appears on the show as Doug Heffernan in crossovers with The King of Queens.
7	Nemo	Joseph V. Perry; Robert Ruth	The owner of Nemo's Pizzaria. Nemo is not seen again in the series after Marco Fogagnolo takes over his pizzeria and calls it Marco's. For his final two appearances, Nemo was played by Robert Ruth.
7	Suzy	Susan Varon	A waitress at Nemo's Pizzaria. She doesn't seem too fond of her job, but she can have a sense of humor.
6	Father Hubley	Charles Durning	The local parish priest. He loves Marie's lasagna. He is very wary of his long-time parishioners, the Barones, but often gives helpful advice.
6	Marco Fogagnolo	David Proval	The intimidating and threatening Italian father of Stefania, who takes over Nemo's Pizzeria after he moves to the United States.. Although he dislikes Robert for dating his daughter, he befriends Robert's parents. Marie and Frank Barone end up fighting for Marco's friendship.
6	Molly Ardolino	Alexandra Romano	Peggy Ardolino's daughter and Ally's best friend. Alexandra Romano was first seen in the show as an unnamed flower girl in a flashback of Ray and Debra's wedding. Ray Romano's real life daughter.
6	Stefania Fogagnolo	Alex Meneses	Robert's beautiful ex-girlfriend. They met while Robert was vacationing with the Barone clan in Italy. Stefania later comes to America, but Robert breaks up with her after realizing that the two have little in common. Stefania befriends Robert's other ex-girlfriend, Amy MacDougall, after she discovers Robert was cheating on Amy with her.
4	Angelina	Tina Arning	A waitress at Nemo's Pizzeria. Ray, Robert, Andy, Gianni, Berny and Doug often go to the restaurant to fantasize about Angelina's beauty.
4	Mel Barone	Phil Leeds	Frank's uncle. Mel is sometimes mean and always seems agitated. Due to never being married, and sometimes showing up to family functions with other men, he feels a need to remind people that he's not gay. Mel is also seen taking a liking to Sarina Barone, despite believing she is a relative.
3	Albert	Albert Romano	A lodge friend of Frank's, who often appears alongside Stan, Garvin and Max. He is played by the father of Ray Romano.
3	Bill Parker	David Hunt	Ray's nemesis neighbor. Bill intentionally trades Hackidu cards with Ray's daughter, Ally, on behalf of his own son, to show that he is a better father than Ray. Bill and his wife later catch Ray trying to take their babysitter. Ray often jokes that Debra wishes she had married him instead, the in-joke being that he is played by Patricia Heaton's real-life husband. Bill has two children.
3	Gerard	Fred Stoller	Ray and Robert's unintelligent and hypochondriacal maternal cousin. He stays with Barone, his aunt, briefly and plays the accordion (mostly the first notes of Deep Purple's "Smoke on the Water" or The Carpenters' "(They Long to Be) Close to You").
3	Jerry	Jerry Lambert	One of the parents of Ally Barone's class. Jerry sides with Ally's father, Ray, and the other parents when they get angry at their children's form teachers. Jerry and Ray also protest against Peggy Ardolino. Although clearly stating his morals in every situation, Jerry is too scared to speak up with Ray and allows him to do the talking.
3	Lee	Debra Mooney	Stan's wife, and Frank and Marie Barone's friend. She celebrates her wedding anniversary at Frank and Marie's house, and later thanks Marie for helping to choose out Robert's wedding gift.
3	Max	Max Rosenthal	A lodge friend of Frank's, who often appears alongside Stan, Garvin and Albert. He is played by the father of the show's executive producer, Philip Rosenthal.
3	Peggy Ardolino	Amy Aquino	Molly Ardolino's mother and the leader of a girl scouts troop, who bullies Ray Barone when he tries to help the girl scouts group. When Debra finds Peggy beating Ray up, she scares Peggy off. Peggy admits to Ray that she became mean when she kicked her lousy husband out of the house. Peggy later becomes Peter MacDougall's girlfriend. Peggy's characteristics are similar to Adolf Hitler, according to Ray.
3	Sally Parker	Tess Oakland	Bill and Carrie Parker's young daughter, who is scared of Ray Barone and is classmates with Ally Barone.
2	Bryan Trenberth	Dan Castellaneta	The coach of a junior tee-ball and basketball team, who is disliked by Ray and Debra for his snacks policy.
2	Aunt Colletta	Silvana De Santis	Marie Barone's second cousin. Colletta and her husband, Giorgio, allow the Barones to stay at their house in Italy. Coletta washes Ray to his embarrassment.
2	Dave	Dave Attell	A friend of Ray's and a member of the Nemo's Pizzaria sponsored basketball team. Ray's wife, Debra, does not like Dave because he smokes.
2	Giorgio	Pierrino Mascarino	Coletta's husband, who gets along with Frank when they make fun of their wives.
2	Harry Stipe	David Byrd	An elderly man who, with his wife Rita Stipe, rents their attic out to Robert Barone. Harry uncannily resembles Robert's father, Frank, and after Ray makes Robert realize this, he moves out. Harry gets mad at Ray for convincing Robert to leave, because he is then been left alone with his wife, like Frank is with Marie. Harry and Rita later meet up with Frank and Marie, and leave Robert jealous as they are fond of Ray.
2	Joanne Glotz	Suzie Plakson	Robert's first wife, who is depicted as a domineering and mean woman. She and Robert divorced before the beginning of the series. After their divorce, she initially hooked up with a man Robert had previously arrested. She formerly worked as a stripper in Atlantic City named Cinnamon. Marie knew about her former job since she appeared on the show, but kept quiet for Robert's sake until Joanne asked for a divorce. Years later, Joanne greets the Barones when she sees them in a restaurant and leaves Robert her number. Robert contacts her and they go on a date, but Joanne leaves when she realizes he wants a relationship and not just sex.
2	Miss Puss	Uncredited	Peter MacDougall's pet cat. She lives with him at his parents house and later moves to Long Island with him.
2	Nester	Uncredited	A bull that gores Robert in the buttocks and injures him. Nestor is first seen on television in a replay of the accident and Robert later confronts the animal at a petting zoo when he is fully recovered.
2	Rita Stipe	Anna Berger	An elderly woman who, with her husband Harry Stipe, rents their attic out to Robert Barone. Rita uncannily resembles Robert's mother, Marie, and after Ray makes Robert realize this, he moves out. Rita later befriends Marie and Frank Barone, before becoming very fond of Robert's brother, Ray.
2	Scott Preman	Bob Odenkirk	Ray's high school friend and Warren's best friend, who meets up with Ray and his wife, Debra at their high school reunion. Scott and Ray attended the same school as Fran Fine and Valerie Toriello. In a later episode, Scott and Walter give a presentation to Ray and Debra, pitching for funds for a go-carting business.
2	Traffic Cop Timmy	Unapplicable	Robert Barone's plastic ventriloquy doll, which he uses to teach road safety and later to cheer people up in the hospital.
2	Warren; Walter	Brian Posehn	As Warren, Ray's high school friend and Scott Preman's best friend, who see Ray at the reunion of their graduating class, which Fran Fine and Valerie Toriello were also in. In a later episode, as Walter, he and Scott give a presentation of their prospective go-carting business to Ray and his wife Debra. Warren was originally credited as Walter.

== Guest characters ==
The following is a list of characters who only had one appearance. They are listed by seasons.

=== Season 1 ===
Episode number	Character	Actor	Circumstances
1	Leo	Stephen Lee	A friend of Ray's, who comes to his house. Leo is only seen in the first episode.
3	Ancient Guy	Carmen Filpi	A war veteran and battle companion of Gus, who attends his funeral and gets scared when he sees a toothbrush moustache painted on one of Ray Barone's children.
3	Alda	Jean Stapleton	Marie Barone's sister, who attends Gus' funeral. She and Marie constantly bicker.
3	Funeral Director	Hugh Holub	The director of Gus' funeral, who announces Ray Barone up to read Gus' elegy.
3	Member of Family	Marlene	A relative of the Barones. She attends Gus' funeral and complains about Marie's cooking at Ray and Debra Barone's wedding reception.
3	Audience Member	Joey Dente	A man at Gus' funeral. He starts a crowd-wide dispute about Marie Barone's behavior at her son's wedding.
6	Kareem Abdul-Jabbar	Himself	A professional basketballer, who goes to Ray Barone's house to meet Debra.
6	Japanese Woman	Kotoko Kawamura	Frank Barone's acquaintance, spotted reading a magazine with Frank.
8	Maitre'd	Wayne Dvorak	A worker at a fancy restaurant that Warren and Lois Whelan take the Barones to.
8	Gerard	Richard Stegman	A waitress, who serves the Barones and Debra's parents at a fancy restaurant.
9	Eddie	Murray Rubin	Frank Barone's friend, who plays poker with Ray, Stan and Garvin.
10	Emma	Pearl Shear	A friend of Mel Barone, who attends his family's Thanksgiving lunch uninvited with her dog, Maggie.
10	Maggie	Uncredited	Emma's pet chihuahua.
11	Tom	Tom Paris	One of the players of Nemo's Pizzaria basketball team.
13	Parent #1	Cynthena Sanders	The mother of a ten month old child, who brings him to the doctor's.
13	Parent #2	Jonathan Chapin	A parent of a child at the doctor's. He is stunned when he sees Terry Bradshaw enter the room.
13	Terry Bradshaw	Himself	A professional footballer. When Ray is forced to take his children to the doctor's, he invited Terry to the waiting room to discuss a book Ray wants to write.
13	Little Kid	Hannah Swanson	A girl in the doctor's waiting room, who asks to touch Terry Bradshaw's bald head.
13	Staring Kid	Curtis Blanck	A boy in the doctor's waiting room on his Game Boy, who stares at Ray Barone.
15	Lisa	Kristin Bauer van Straten	Ray Barone's ex-girlfriend seen in a flashback.
16	Barry Bonds	Himself	A professional baseball player, who talks with Ray.
17	Cable Guy	Jon Manfrellotti	A cable guy from Lynbrook, who comes to fix Ray Barone's television. It was Manfrellotti's first character on the show, his second being Gianni.
18	Katarina Witt	Herself	A professional figure skater, who sees Ray and Debra Barone at the Sportswriter of the Year Awards ceremony.
18	Announcer	Tom Paris	The announcer of the Sportswriter of the Year Awards ceremony.
18	Marv Albert	Himself	A famous sportscaster, who announces the winner of the Sportswriter of the Year Award.
19	Kristi Yamaguchi	Herself	A professional figure skater, who watches Ray Barone's interviews.
19	Phylis	Patience Cleveland	A dog breeder and Shamsky II's original owner. When she comes to pick up Shamsky from the Barones, she refuses to take him after seeing the "fixes" they made to him, so Robert keeps him.
20	Tommy Lasorda	Himself	A professional baseball player, who visits Ray Barone's house and tells him how to cook properly after tasting his sauce.
20	Arthur	Steven Hack	One of Ray and Debra Barone's neighbors, who visits their house to complain about Ray's parents, however he joins Lisa, Mack, Ruth Greene and Robert for lunch at Ray's parents' house the following day.
20	Lisa	Cathy Ladman	One of Ray and Debra Barone's neighbors, who visits their house to complain about the noise Frank makes. She pulls back from her complaints when Frank invites her over for lunch.
20	Mack	Lance E. Nichols	One of Ray and Debra Barone's neighbors. He joins the other nearby residents in protesting against Ray's parents and complains about the rubbish he receives on his lawn from Barone. He reveals that he has been taping Frank in his front yard for a few weeks and presents the meeting with a recording that captures Frank's behavior. He later attends Frank and Marie's lunch.
20	Ruth Greene	Patricia Belcher	One of Ray and Debra Barone's neighbors, who expresses her concerns over Ray's parents by calling a meeting between all the neighbors. She is later invited to Ray's parents' house for lunch.
20	The Pope	Gene Greytak	Ray imagines Pope John Paul II expressing his anger in the mirror when Ray feels guilty for betraying his parents by hosting a meeting about them behind their backs. He is played by Gene Greytak, a professional impersonator of Pope John Paul II.
20	Priest	Don Perry	A local parish priest, who Ray has a counselling session with to discuss his guilt over his parents. The priest forgives Ray when he discovers his parents are Frank and Marie Barone.
21	Bartender	Lorraine Shaw	A bartender, who serves Ray when he is talking to Desmond Howard.
21	Desmond Howard	Himself	A professional football player, who talks with Ray Barone at a sports bar.
21	Dr. Nora	Mary Kay Adams	A radio psychotherapist, who Debra Barone meets with. Nora ends up speaking with the rest of the Barones as well.

=== Season 2 ===
Episode number	Character	Actor	Circumstances
1	Roy Firestone	Himself	A professional sports commentator, who is on a talk show with, Ray Barone, Kevin Daniels and James Worthy.
1	James Worthy	Himself	A professional sports commentator, who is on a talk show with Ray Barone, Kevin Daniels and Roy Firestone.
2	Celia	Linda Kash	The instructor of a parenting class that Ray and Debra Barone attend. She tells Ray to be softer with his children and refrain from shouting.
5	Dr. Sundram	Iqbal Theba	A doctor who treats Ray Barone and suggests he plays more golf to alleviate stress.
6	Young Ray	Daniel Hansen	Ray and Robert Barone when they were children. They are only ever seen in a flashback of when their parents temporarily separated.
6	Young Robert	Ethan Glazer	Ray and Robert Barone when they were children. They are only ever seen in a flashback of when their parents temporarily separated.
7	Pat O'Brien	Himself	A professional sports commentator, who is commentating Ray and Andy's paper football game at work.
7	Guy	Christopher Michael Moore	A delivery guy, who brings Ray's stuff to his house when he decides to work from home.
9	Wo-Hop	John Lee	The owner of Wo-Hop's Chinese Takeout restaurant.
10	Jessica Bell	Pamela Bowen	A pretty girl that Ray Barone, Scott Preman and Warren went to school with. Ray, Scott and Warren see her at their high school reunion.
10	Pete	Marty Rackham	A bully at Ray Barone's old high school, who used to push Ray into the girls' bathroom. Robert Barone later reveals that he once pushed Pete into the girls' bathroom.
10	Cool Guy	Andrew Williams	One of Ray Barone's popular old classmates. Ray sees him at their high school reunion.
11	Gayle	Kristen Trucksess	A friend of Debra's, who goes to Debra's house for a Tupperware party. Gayle is mentioned numerous times throughout the sitcom.
11	Helen	Nora Dunn	A lady running a Tupperware party at Debra's house.
12	Erin	Christine Cavanaugh	A lady at Ray Barone's work, who speaks to Ray and Andy about women being in the mood for sex.
13	Harry	John F. O'Donohue	A friend of Frank Barone's, who enjoys participating in war reenactments. He, Frank, Robert and Ray participate in an American Civil War reenactment.
14	Sarina Barone	Argentina Brunetti	Zia Sarina Barone comes to Long Island to stay with the Barones, believing Frank Barone is her nephew. She is proud of her grandnephew, Ray, when she sees his sportswriting awards. However, when Zia Sarina and Frank realize that they are not actually related, Anna Barone comes to pick Sarina up.
14	Cab Driver	Mike Batay	A taxi driver, who drops Sarina Barone off at Ray and Debra Barone's house. He asks for a tip from Debra.
14	Anna Barone	Stella Farentino	Sarina Barone's grand niece, who comes to pick her up. She explains the Barones that there a lot of people with the last name Barone and that one family moved to the United States and named themselves Barones, the family being Frank's father and uncles.
16	Old Woman	Martha Faulkner	An old woman waiting in the ATM line. Ray Barone goes in front of her, so she goes to find a policeman and gets Robert to tell Ray off.
17	Hold-Up Guy	Stephen Bruno	A criminal who holds up Ray, Robert, Nemo, Suzy and Angelina in Nemo's Pizzaria. Robert and Judy Potter then arrest him.
20	Lisa Trenberth	Jenny Buchanan	Bryan Trenberth's wife and the junior tee-ball team's healthy snacks coordinator.
20	Parent	Jerry Hauck	The parent of a child in a junior tee-ball team. He shouts out in encouragement for the team.
20	Teacher	Yolanda Snowball	One of Geoffrey and Michael Barone's teachers at their junior tee-ball game.
23	Mrs. Scarpula	Unknown	Ray and Debra Barone's neighbor. She is only seen once at Frank Barone's garage sale, but is often mentioned in the earlier seasons of the sitcom.
23	Pregnant Woman	Susan Segal	A pregnant woman at Frank Barone's garage sale, who is interested in buying a crib.
23	Wendell	Nick DeGruccio	A man at Frank Barone's garage sale, who overhears Ray and Debra talking about having another child.
23	Don	Richard Marion	A man at Frank Barone's garage sale, who is interested in buying his sofa.
23	Woman	Sarah Rush	A woman at Frank Barone's garage sale, who asks Robert Barone if photos of him as a child dressed in a skirt are for sale.
25	Duddie	Michael Duddie	One of Ray's groomsmen at his wedding. Duddie is only ever seen in a flashback.
25	Lewis	Al Romano	A friend of Mel Barone's, who attended Ray's wedding. Lewis is only ever seen in a flashback. Ray Ramano's real father.

=== Season 3 ===
Episode number	Character	Actor	Circumstances
3	Lisa	Senta Moses	A babysitter Ray and Debra Barone hire for their children. Lisa is liked by the Barone children, but when Marie gets jealous of her work, Ray is forced to fire Lisa. Lisa becomes Sally Parker's babysitter and when Ray tries to get Lisa back, Sally's parents shoo him off.
6	Dracula	Vinnie Buffolino	A child dressed as Count Dracula for Halloween. He is given candy by Frank Barone, but when Ray realizes Frank accidentally gave him a condom instead of a chocolate coin, Ray chases after him and pays him money to get the condom back.
6	Halloween Trick-or-Treater	Zachary Robinson	Four Halloween trick-or-treaters who all visit the Barone house and are given candy by Frank Barone. The trick-or-treaters are all played by family members of the show's production crew.
6	Halloween Trick-or-Treater	Ben Rosenthal	Four Halloween trick-or-treaters who all visit the Barone house and are given candy by Frank Barone. The trick-or-treaters are all played by family members of the show's production crew.
6	Halloween Trick-or-Treater	Nicholas Rossitto	Four Halloween trick-or-treaters who all visit the Barone house and are given candy by Frank Barone. The trick-or-treaters are all played by family members of the show's production crew.
6	Halloween Trick-or-Treater	Sam Skrovan	Four Halloween trick-or-treaters who all visit the Barone house and are given candy by Frank Barone. The trick-or-treaters are all played by family members of the show's production crew.
10	Delivery Man	Joe Durrenberger	A delivery man who delivers Ray Barone a freshly cooked turkey during Marie Barone's healthy Thanksgiving lunch.
11	Michelle	Betsy Monroe	A woman who lives in Robert Barone's apartment building, who constantly asks Robert for washing detergent. She meets Robert's brother, Ray, in the elevator, then goes to Robert's room to ask for more detergent.
11	Sandy	Janelle Paradee	A woman who lives in Robert Barone's apartment building, who always asks to use Robert's phone when she is locked out of her apartment.
11	Jessica	Kelly Rebecca Walsh	Sandy's best friend. She invites Robert and Ray Barone to their party on Saturday night.
12	Leann	Drenda Spohnholtz	A skier Robert Barone is dating. Leann joins Debra Barone's family for Christmas and gives Marie Barone second-hand bath salts.
12	Exchange Lady	P.B. Hutton	An exchange lady at Bloomingdale's Store. When Frank Barone wishes her a merry Christmas, wanting to exchange a gift, she tells him that she is Jewish. She later calls security when Marie Barone is trying to steal a gift of an elderly customer.
12	Sales Clerk	Phillip Abrams	A sales clerk for Bloomingdale's Store, who suggests to Frank Barone that there is more stock in the storage room.
12	Elderly Lady	Peggy Doyle	An elderly woman Marie Barone spots, holding a lost gift of hers. She tries to get it back, but the lady insists it is hers, until Marie snatches it off her and runs off.
14	Drunk Kid	Bradley Warden	One of Ray Barone's high school friends, who attended a party Ray through behind his parents back in the 70s. He is only ever seen in a flashback.
15	Sareesa	Shelley Robertson	Two of Judy Potter's friends. They meet Judy's partner on the police force, Robert, at a black bar and tell Robert they like to dance, so the four of them later dance on the dance floor in front of the DJ.
15	Man	Kivi Rogers	Two of Judy Potter's friends. They meet Judy's partner on the police force, Robert, at a black bar and tell Robert they like to dance, so the four of them later dance on the dance floor in front of the DJ.
16	Abe "Bullethead" Warchiser	John David Conti	A member of the lodge Frank Barone attends. Bullethead is Frank's worst enemy and tells Robert and Ray that he does not like Frank when they are trying to make a tribute video for him. Bullethead is mentioned a few times throughout the sitcom, but only seen once.
16	Milt	Charles C. Stevenson, Jr.	Members of the lodge Frank Barone attends. They all take part in a tribute to Frank that his sons are making, despite disliking him.
16	Guy	TR Richards	Members of the lodge Frank Barone attends. They all take part in a tribute to Frank that his sons are making, despite disliking him.
16	Lodge Member	Jack Axelrod	Members of the lodge Frank Barone attends. They all take part in a tribute to Frank that his sons are making, despite disliking him.
16	Lodge Member	Lou Charloff	Members of the lodge Frank Barone attends. They all take part in a tribute to Frank that his sons are making, despite disliking him.
16	Lodge Member	Ancel Cook	Members of the lodge Frank Barone attends. They all take part in a tribute to Frank that his sons are making, despite disliking him.
16	Lodge Member	Al Eben	Members of the lodge Frank Barone attends. They all take part in a tribute to Frank that his sons are making, despite disliking him.
16	Lodge Member	Stuard Gold	Members of the lodge Frank Barone attends. They all take part in a tribute to Frank that his sons are making, despite disliking him.
16	Lodge Member	Greg Lewis	Members of the lodge Frank Barone attends. They all take part in a tribute to Frank that his sons are making, despite disliking him.
16	Lodge Member	Allan Lurie	Members of the lodge Frank Barone attends. They all take part in a tribute to Frank that his sons are making, despite disliking him.
16	Lodge Member	Fred Ornstein	Members of the lodge Frank Barone attends. They all take part in a tribute to Frank that his sons are making, despite disliking him.
16	Lodge Member	John Spaulding	Members of the lodge Frank Barone attends. They all take part in a tribute to Frank that his sons are making, despite disliking him.
17	Ted	Hiram Kasten	An employee on the cruise ship Ray and Marie Barone go on. Ted mistakes Marie for Ray's girlfriend and makes fun of him throughout the cruise due to their age gap, despite Marie being Ray's mother.
17	Walter	Jack Betts	A man who meets Marie Barone on a cruiseship and takes a liking towards her. He plays shuffleboard and dances with her.
17	Thelma	Bobbie Norman	A woman Marie Barone meets on a cruisehip. They become friends.
17	Mary Beth	Sharon Houston	A young lady Marie Barone meets on a cruisehip. They do Tai chi and a Jazzercise session with one another, whilst Marie continuously gives marriage advice to Mary, who is on her honeymoon.
17	Merry Widow #1	Beecey Carlson	Four widows on a cruiseship. They all befriend Marie Barone, who pretends that she is a widow too, and they sing together in front of Marie's son.
17	Merry Widow #2	Leigh Rose	Four widows on a cruiseship. They all befriend Marie Barone, who pretends that she is a widow too, and they sing together in front of Marie's son.
17	Merry Widow #3	Jean Sincere	Four widows on a cruiseship. They all befriend Marie Barone, who pretends that she is a widow too, and they sing together in front of Marie's son.
17	Merry Widow #4	Edrie Warner	Four widows on a cruiseship. They all befriend Marie Barone, who pretends that she is a widow too, and they sing together in front of Marie's son.
18	Aileen	Leslie Windram	A woman who goes on a date with Robert Barone and heads to his apartment. Robert's brother, Ray, crashes their night, so Aileen leaves.
19	Art Shamsky	Himself	Eight 1969 New York Mets players, who are signing autographs to a crowd. Robert Barone forces Ray to take to him to the signing to get Art Shamsky's autograph, however they are kicked out when Ray cuts in line.
19	Tommie Agee	Himself	Eight 1969 New York Mets players, who are signing autographs to a crowd. Robert Barone forces Ray to take to him to the signing to get Art Shamsky's autograph, however they are kicked out when Ray cuts in line.
19	Jerry Grote	Himself	Eight 1969 New York Mets players, who are signing autographs to a crowd. Robert Barone forces Ray to take to him to the signing to get Art Shamsky's autograph, however they are kicked out when Ray cuts in line.
19	Bud Harrelson	Himself	Eight 1969 New York Mets players, who are signing autographs to a crowd. Robert Barone forces Ray to take to him to the signing to get Art Shamsky's autograph, however they are kicked out when Ray cuts in line.
19	Cleon Jones	Himself	Eight 1969 New York Mets players, who are signing autographs to a crowd. Robert Barone forces Ray to take to him to the signing to get Art Shamsky's autograph, however they are kicked out when Ray cuts in line.
19	Ed Kranepool	Himself	Eight 1969 New York Mets players, who are signing autographs to a crowd. Robert Barone forces Ray to take to him to the signing to get Art Shamsky's autograph, however they are kicked out when Ray cuts in line.
19	Tug McGraw	Himself	Eight 1969 New York Mets players, who are signing autographs to a crowd. Robert Barone forces Ray to take to him to the signing to get Art Shamsky's autograph, however they are kicked out when Ray cuts in line.
19	Ron Swoboda	Himself	Eight 1969 New York Mets players, who are signing autographs to a crowd. Robert Barone forces Ray to take to him to the signing to get Art Shamsky's autograph, however they are kicked out when Ray cuts in line.
19	Man #1	D'Wayne Gardner	A man in line at the New York Mets meet and greet. He tells Ray Barone that he loves his sports column.
19	Man #2	Harry Freedman	A man in line at the New York Mets meet and greet, who pushes Ray Barone out of line when Ray cuts in front of him.
19	Man #3	John Fairlie	Another man in line at the New York Mets meet and greet. He talks to Robert Barone about the 1969 players.
19	Security Guard	Gene Arrington	A security guard for the New York Mets meet and greet, who removes Ray Barone from the line when pushes in front.
19	Waitress	Valerie DeKeyser	A waitress in a small café. She takes Ray and Robert Barone's orders.
19	Police Officer	Chip Heller	A policeman, who pulls Ray Barone's car over and gives him a ticket. When Ray mispronounces his name, the officer gets mad at him.
20	Kid #2	Julia Skrovan	A child in Ally Barone's class. When Ally brings Constable Robert Barone in for show and tell, the child asks Robert if she can climb on him.
20	Kid #3	Martin Abbe-Schneider	Another child in Ally Barone's class, named Marty. He asks Robert Barone if he is going to eat the children due to his tallness.
