= Halloween Candy =

- Everybody Loves Raymond episode
- Frank in costume as the Frankenstein monster
- Episode no.: Season 3 Episode 6
- Directed by: Steve Zuckerman
- Written by: Steve Skrovan
- Cinematography by: Mike Berlin
- Editing by: Patricia Barnett
- Production code: 9805
- Original air date: October 26, 1998
- Running time: 22 minutes

Episode chronology
← Previous "The Visit"	Next → "Moving Out"
- Everybody Loves Raymond (season 3)

"Halloween Candy" is the sixth episode of the third season of the American sitcom Everybody Loves Raymond (1996–2005). The episode aired on October 26, 1998 on CBS.

== Production ==
According to Philip Rosenthal, "we had always wanted to do an adult show about families" since season one of Everybody Loves Raymond. Steve Skrovan, for instance, had pitched "Halloween Candy" to CBS before the filming of the season; however, the network rejected due to being a Friday-night show It took until its third year when the series moved to Mondays at 9:00 PM for the episode to be produced and publicly aired. The episode is both writer Skrovan and director Steve Zuckerman's second collaboration of the season after "Getting Even."

== Reception ==
Upon "Halloween Candy"'s original airing, The Palm Beach Post named it one of the "funniest moments" of all shows of the 1998–99 season. The Oregonian ranked it the seventh best episode of the entire series, and Russell Engebretson of DVD Verdict claimed it to be his favorite season three installment, alongside "Dancing with Debra" and "How They Met." As of October 2019, "Halloween Candy" is the eighth highest-rated Halloween-themed television episode on IMDb with a rating of 8.1/10. Both Tech Times and the International Business Times include "Halloween Candy" in unranked lists of best Halloween episodes to view on Netflix.
