= The Toaster (Everybody Loves Raymond) =

- Everybody Loves Raymond episode
- Episode no.: Season 3 Episode 12
- Directed by: Steve Zuckerman
- Written by: Philip Rosenthal
- Cinematography by: Mike Berlin
- Editing by: Patricia Barnett
- Production code: 9812
- Original air date: December 14, 1998
- Running time: 22 minutes

Guest appearances
- Robert Culp as Warren Whelan; Katherine Helmond as Lois Whelan; Patricia Bethune as Exchange Lady; Peggy Doyle as Elderly Woman; Drenda Spohnholtz as Leann; Phil Abrams as Sales Clerk

Episode chronology
← Previous "The Apartment"	Next → "Ping Pong"
- Everybody Loves Raymond (season 3)

"The Toaster" is the 12th episode of the third season of the American sitcom Everybody Loves Raymond (1996–2005). The episode aired on December 14, 1998 on CBS. The series follows the life of Newsday sportswriter Ray Barone as he tries to cope with being with his neurotic family, consisting of wife Debra (Patricia Heaton), parents Frank (Peter Boyle) and Marie (Doris Roberts), brother Robert (Brad Garrett), daughter Ally (Madylin Sweeten), and twin sons Michael (Sullivan Sweeten) and Geoffrey (Sawyer Sweeten).

== Reception ==
According to Nielsen Media Research, "The Toaster" tied with the CBS television film Christmas in My Hometown for the 12th most-viewed program of the week of December 16, 1998, garnering 10.8% of 97 million American homes. Reviewing season three of Raymond, Jeffrey Robinson of DVD Talk called the episode "quite funny" and filled with "some classic moments." It has been named the eighth best episode of Raymond by The Oregonian and is a series favorite for Rosenthal.

"The Toaster" has been placed on several retrospective lists of best Christmas episodes. Screen Rant ranked it the second best Christmas episode from a 1990s sitcom, and The New York Observer placed it at number ten on its list of all-time Christmas episodes. The Herald-Dispatch ranked it number two on its list, and Channel 24 number nine. Both lists highlighted the episode's lines "You’re a trophy wife? What contest in hell did I win?" which also topped Screen Rant's list of best Frank Barone quotes. Channel 28 also named it one of the top ten best Raymond one-liners. People put Marie and Frank's argument about the toaster as one of Roberts' best moments in the show, elaborating that it showcased "some of the finest acting Peter Boyle and Roberts would ever do together."

== Home media ==
On May 3, 2005, all of the third season of Everybody Loves Raymond was released to DVD; the set not only features "The Toaster," but also an audio commentary track of the episode by Romano and Rosenthal. It was also released to Amazon Prime on November 8, 2013 alongside the other season three episodes. It, along with the whole series, was also available on Netflix until September 1, 2016.
