= Sweetin =

Sweetin can refer to two American actresses:

- Jodie Sweetin, best known for her role as Stephanie Tanner on Full House and Fuller House
- Madylin Sweeten, who played Ally Barone on Everybody Loves Raymond
