= Ping Pong (Everybody Loves Raymond) =

- Everybody Loves Raymond episode
- Episode no.: Season 3 Episode 13
- Directed by: Will Mackenzie
- Written by: Aaron Shure
- Cinematography by: Mike Berlin
- Editing by: Patricia Barnett
- Production code: 9814
- Original air date: January 11, 1999
- Running time: 22 minutes

Episode chronology
← Previous "The Toaster"	Next → "Pants on Fire"
- Everybody Loves Raymond (season 3)

"Ping Pong" is the 13th episode of the third season of the American sitcom Everybody Loves Raymond (1996–2005). The episode aired on January 11, 1999 on CBS.

== Reception ==
Following the end of the 1998 Monday Night Football season Everybody Loves Raymond was competing with, CBS chose to air the sports-themed "Ping Pong" in order to attract the football series' male demographic. Upon its original airing, "Ping Pong" attracted 11.6% of 980,000 American homes, making it the fourteenth most-viewed program of the week. According to Screen Rant, "Ping Pong" "is one of the most iconic of the entire series, as it finds Ray and Frank pitted against each other in a vicious battle." However, the source criticized Ray's insult to Robert, "zero serving zero - you experimented in camp," for its homophobic nature. For his acting in [["Ping Pong"]] and [["Driving Frank,"]] Peter Boyle was nominated for a Primetime Emmy Award for Outstanding Supporting Actor in a Comedy Series.

=== King of Queens Connection ===
A similar premise was also used for companion series The King of Queens (1998-2007): in the Season 6 episode "King Pong", Doug enlists Arthur's help in defeating Carrie.
