= Scruples (game) =

Card game based on ethical dilemmas

The Game of Moral Dilemmas
- Designers: Henry Makow
- Publishers: High Game Enterprises
- Players: 4–12
- Setup time: 1 minute
- Playing time: about 1 hour
- Chance: Low (card drawing, luck)
- Skills: Simple social skills Bluffing

A Question of Scruples is a card game based on ethical dilemmas. The game was invented by Henry Makow in 1984 and developed by High Game Enterprises.

== Gameplay ==
Players are given five yellow cards apiece, each yellow card with a moral dilemma such as, "You accidentally damage a car in a parking lot. Do you leave a note with your name and phone number?" Each player also has a single red card, with either "YES", "NO", or "DEPENDS" printed upon it. The player must ask the question on a yellow card of the person whom the holder of the yellow card believes most likely to reply with the answer on the questioner's red card. The game thus tests how well players know each other.

If the answer matches that on the red card, the questioner discards both yellow card and red card, then takes another red card. The game is won by the player who first discards all five of his yellow cards.

== Release history ==
The game was originally designed and marketed by Henry Makow in Canada in 1984, who licensed the game to Maruca Industries–Carl Eisenberg. The game took off in the United States due to a marketing program by Schwartz Public Relations Associates, representing Maruca, that resulted in the game being played twice on The Tonight Show Starring Johnny Carson, and featured in The Wall Street Journal along with other publications and newspapers. Carl Eisenberg negotiated a deal with Steven Hassenfeld of Hasbro, through licensing agent Douglas Polumbaum, to sell the US rights to Hasbro, which resulted in Hasbro also licensing other rights directly from Henry Makow in 1986.

Maruca initially sold 500,000 copies and, being a small company, could not produce the product fast enough. Hasbro was so excited by the potential of the game that they gave Maruca the ultimatum of licensing to them, or being knocked off and advertised out of business. Maruca licensed the game for a sum of $1,500,000, and Makow was paid $1,000,000 plus a royalty.

The game sold to Hasbro, who marketed the game (partly through Parker Brothers) for several years. The game has since sold over seven million copies worldwide and has been translated into five languages. Hasbro later returned the rights to Henry Makow of High Game Enterprises.

Due to the cultural aspect of the moral dilemma questions, Scruples was updated every five years, until the Millennium edition, which is the latest version. It contains 150 questions from four previous versions and 100 new questions.

== Other versions ==
Popularity of the game led to several computer versions developed by Leisure Genius in 1987. Versions were released for the Commodore 64, ZX Spectrum, and Amstrad CPC.

At one time, pilots for a game show version of the game were taped.

In 2016, the original inventor introduced an iOS version for Apple products.

== In other media ==
The game was featured in a first-season episode of Everybody Loves Raymond, "The Game". A version of the game called "Ethical Dilemma" appeared in an episode of Married... with Children. 2 Broke Girls featured a bootleg version of the game called Scrumples.

== Reviews ==
- Jeux & Stratégie #40
