= Joseph V. Perry =

American actor (1931–2000)

- Perry in I Dream of Jeannie, 1968
- Born: Joseph Victor Perry; February 13, 1931; Pittsburgh, Pennsylvania, U.S.
- Died: February 23, 2000 (aged 69); Burbank, California, U.S.
- Education: UCLA

Joseph Victor Perry (February 13, 1931 – February 23, 2000) was an American actor who appeared in multiple films and television programs during the 1970s and 1980s. Frequently cast as a criminal or police officer in popular, dramatic, television series and comedies that were broadcast across the United States, he was possibly best known for his role as Nemo in Everybody Loves Raymond.

== Early years ==
Born in Pittsburgh, Pennsylvania, Perry began acting in his youth, winning the Glenn Ford Award at Santa Monica High School in California in 1949. His successes continued in 1952 with a best actor award from UCLA.

== Career ==
Perry officially started his film career in 1955 at the age of 24 and spent the next 45 years appearing in hundreds of films and television shows, including dramatic anthologies, westerns, medical dramas, police dramas, and classic sitcoms. He appeared in The Twilight Zone S1 E29 "Nightmare as a Child" 1960, Night Gallery in the episode "Midnight Never Ends" and on other shows including Rawhide, Dr. Kildare, Gunsmoke, Official Detective, The Doris Day Show (in 3 episodes), Bewitched (in 4 episodes), M*A*S*H, I Dream of Jeannie, and The Partridge Family (in 4 episodes). In the 1970s his visibility peaked with guest appearances on shows, including Mannix (in 5 episodes), The F.B.I. (in 8 episodes), Emergency! (in 3 episodes), The Streets of San Francisco (in 2 episodes), Sara, Barney Miller (in 4 episodes), The Rockford Files and Kojak (in 3 episodes). He failed to land any mainstream acting roles until 1978, however, when he got several roles in shows such as The Incredible Hulk, MacGyver, Cheers, Murder, She Wrote (in 2 episodes) and Seinfeld. On the series Everybody Loves Raymond he got the biggest break of his later career when he portrayed Nemo, a pizza restaurant owner from 1996 to 1999, in a total of seven episodes, until his death in 2000.

== Death ==
On February 23, 2000, Perry died in Burbank, California. His character's last appearance in Everybody Loves Raymond was shown posthumously when his restaurant got bought out. Nemo's last two appearances were played by Robert Ruth.

== Partial filmography ==
Year	Title	Role	Notes
1958	The Left Handed Gun	Clerk	Uncredited
1965	The Greatest Story Ever Told	Archelaus	Uncredited
1965	Lust and the Flesh	Bob	
1968	Don't Just Stand There!	Jean-Jacques	
1968	A Lovely Way to Die	Reporter	Uncredited 1968 - The Shakiest Gun In The West - Indian Enamored with Jesse dressed as squaw - Uncredited
1968	Fade In	George	
1969	The Love God?	Big Joe	
1972	Stand Up and Be Counted	Foreman	Uncredited
1974	Herbie Rides Again	First Cab Driver	Uncredited
1977	The Domino Principle	Bowkemp	
1981	Longshot	Marty	
1988	Vibes	Dave	
1989	The Freeway Maniac	Salesman	
1989	Wizards of the Lost Kingdom II	Merchant	
1989	The Karate Kid Part III	Uncle Louie LaRusso	
1990	Repossessed	Special Effects Man	
1993	Hot Shots! Part Deux	Singing Waiter	

== Selected television ==
Year	Title	Role	Notes
1959	Have Gun - Will Travel	Sheriff	Season 3, Episode 9 "The Black Handkerchief"
1960	Wanted: Dead or Alive	Flint Bickford	Season 2, Episode 23 "Tolliver Bender"
1962 & 1963	Gunsmoke	Outlaw Lee & Outlaw Moran	S7:E27 "Wagon Girls" & S8:E21 “The Cousin”
1967	The Monkees	Vernon	S1:E20, "Monkees in the Ring"
1968	I Dream Of Jeannie	Bartender	"Jeannie, Jeannie Who's Got The Jeannie?"
1968	I Dream Of Jeannie	SGT Marion	"Jeannie and the Top Secret Secret"
1971	The Virginian	Harvey	Season 9, Episode 24 "Jump-up"
