= Katherine Helmond =

American actress (1929–2019)

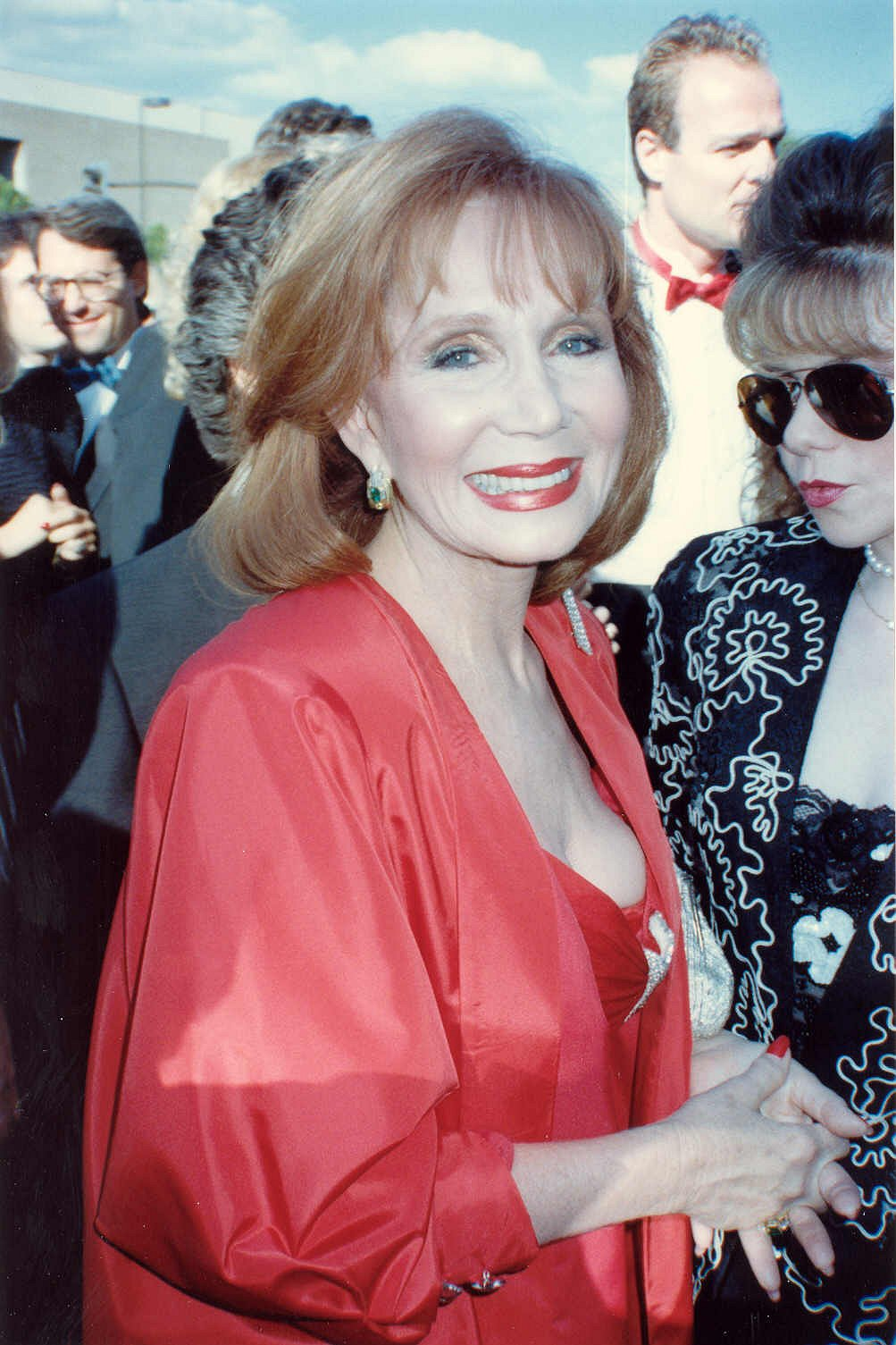
- Helmond at the 41st Primetime Emmy Awards in 1989
- Born: Katherine Marie Helmond; July 5, 1929; Galveston, Texas, U.S.
- Died: February 23, 2019 (aged 89); Los Angeles, California, U.S.
- Occupation: Actress
- Years active: 1955–2018
- Known for: Soap; Who's the Boss? Coach; Everybody Loves Raymond
- Spouses: George N. Martin (m. 1959; div. 1962) David Christian (m. 1969)

Katherine Marie Helmond (July 5, 1929 – February 23, 2019) was an American actress. Over an acting career spanning six decades, she was best known for her starring role as Jessica Tate on the sitcom Soap (1977–1981) and her co-starring role as Mona Robinson on Who's the Boss? (1984–1992). Helmond also played Doris Sherman on Coach (1995–1997) and Lois Whelan (the mother of Debra Barone) on Everybody Loves Raymond (1996–2004). She also appeared as a guest on several talk and variety shows.

Helmond had featured roles in a number of films including Alfred Hitchcock's Family Plot (1976), Terry Gilliam's Time Bandits (1981) and Brazil (1985), and Garry Marshall's Overboard (1987). She also voiced Lizzie in the Cars film franchise by Disney/Pixar between 2006 and 2017.

== Early life ==
Helmond was born on July 5, 1929, in Galveston, Texas, to Irish Catholic parents Thelma Louise (née Walker) and Patrick Joseph Helmond, a laborer. Her name on her birth certificate was misspelled as "Catherine". She had a younger sister, Jo Ann, born three years later, who died in infancy.

Helmond experienced economic hardship during her childhood: ‘we were very poor...from as early as I can remember I had to work to help support the family. I had to learn to stand on my own two feet’. She was raised by her mother and grandmother, both devout Catholics. Her father left the family and her mother eventually remarried in 1937, to Marshall Phillips. She attended a Catholic primary school and appeared in school plays.

== Career ==
After graduating from high school, she moved to Houston, Dallas and New York. She was not professionally trained, but learned her craft through experience: ‘My training was all practical and on the job'. She cleaned toilets and repaired costumes while acting in plays in New York. After her stage debut in As You Like It, Helmond began working in New York City in 1955. She later ran a summer theatre in the Catskills for three seasons and taught acting in university theatre programs. She made her uncredited television debut in 1962 on Car 54, Where Are You?, but did not begin to appear on television regularly until 1973. She also acted on stage, earning a Tony Award nomination for her performance on Broadway in Eugene O'Neill's The Great God Brown (1973). Her other appearances on Broadway included roles in Private Lives, Don Juan, and Mixed Emotions.

Helmond appeared in such feature films as Family Plot (1976), Time Bandits (1981), Brazil (1985), in which she played the mother of Jonathan Pryce's character, and Overboard (1987). In 1983, she studied at the American Film Institute's Directing Workshop. She picked up Emmy nominations for her role as Mona Robinson in Who's the Boss and as Lois Whelan in Everybody Loves Raymond. She also received acclaim for her stage performance in Eve Ensler's The Vagina Monologues.

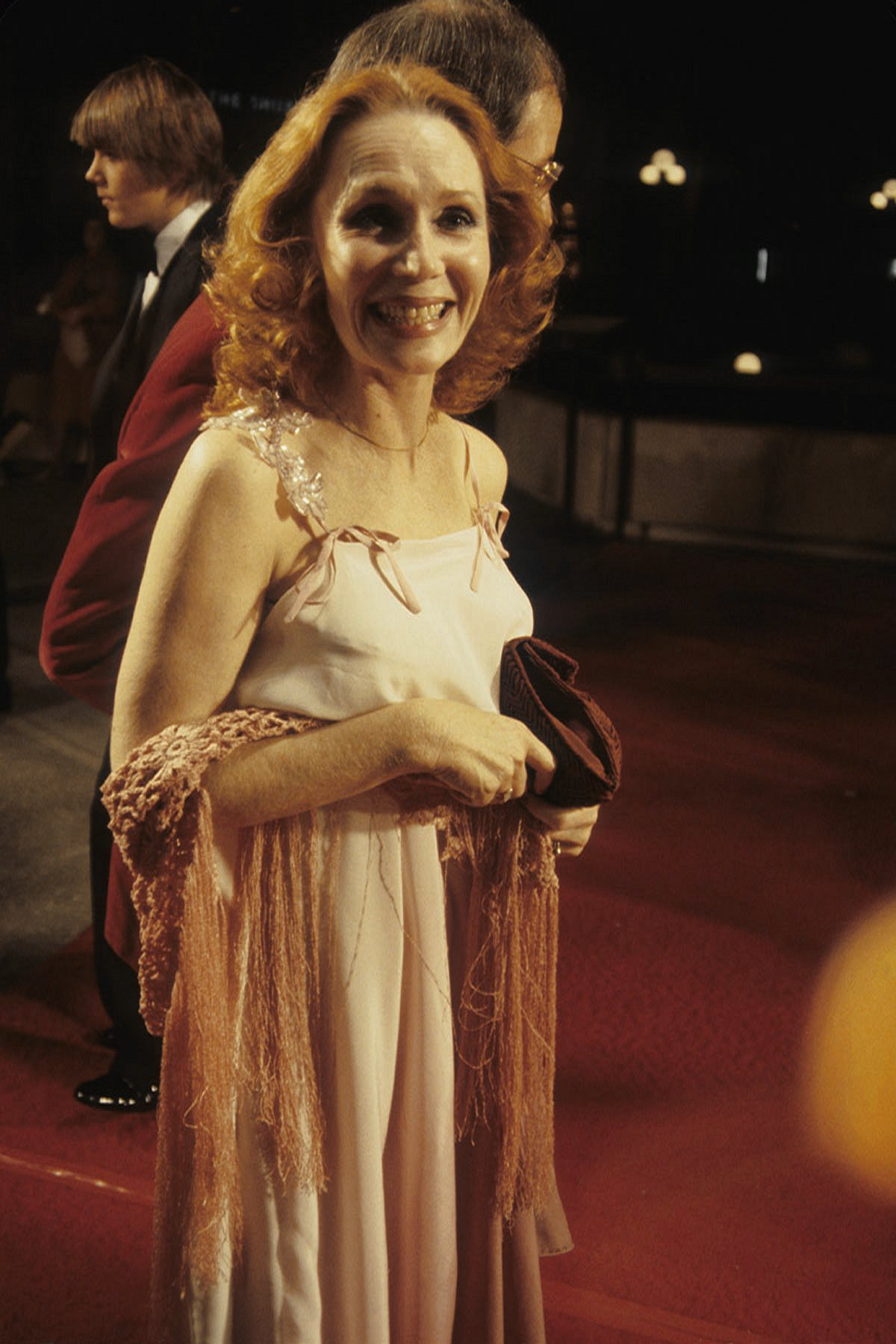
Helmond in 1979

Helmond appeared in The Legend of Lizzie Borden (1975) as Emma Borden, the title character's sister. She appeared in an episode of the short-lived 1976 CBS adventure series, Spencer's Pilots, starring Gene Evans. Helmond gained prominence as Jessica Tate, the ditzy matriarch of the Tate family in Soap (1977–1981) on ABC. From 1984 to 1992, she played the role of Mona Robinson on the ABC sitcom Who's the Boss? She appeared in a 1993 episode of The Upper Hand, the British version of Who's the Boss? From 1995 to 1997, she starred in the ABC sitcom Coach as Doris Sherman, eccentric owner of the fictional Orlando Breakers professional football team. From 1996 to 2004, she had a recurring role on Everybody Loves Raymond as Lois Whelan (Ray Barone's mother-in-law). On July 25, 2010, she guest-starred on A&E Network's The Glades and as Caroline Bellefleur on HBO's True Blood. She was also the voice of Lizzie in the Cars film franchise (2006–2017).

== Award nominations ==
Helmond was nominated for Broadway's 1973 Tony Award as Best Supporting or Featured Actress (Dramatic) for Eugene O'Neill's The Great God Brown. She was nominated for an Emmy for her role on Soap four times in a row (1978–1981) as Best Actress in a Comedy Series. In 1988 and 1989, she was nominated as Best Supporting Actress in a Comedy Series for her role on Who's the Boss? In 2002, she was nominated as Guest Actress in a Comedy Series for her role in Everybody Loves Raymond. She won two Golden Globe awards for Who's the Boss? and Soap.

== Personal life ==
In 1959, Helmond married George N. Martin in New York; they divorced in 1962.

She met her second husband, David Richard Christian, in 1962, when he was 19. They married in 1969, in New York, after dating for seven years. They remained married until her death, residing in Los Angeles, New York City, Long Island, and London. She and Christian had a history as students of Zen. After Helmond died, her husband said: ‘She was the love of my life...We spent 57 beautiful, wonderful, loving years together, which I will treasure forever… The night she died, I saw that the moon was exactly half-full, just as I am now … half of what I’ve been my entire adult life.’

== Death ==
Helmond died on February 23, 2019, from Alzheimer's disease at her home in Los Angeles, aged 89. Her death was announced a week later.

== Selected filmography ==
=== Film ===
Year	Film	Role	Notes
1971	Believe in Me	Saleslady	
1971	The Hospital	Mrs. Marilyn Mead	
1975	The Hindenburg	Mrs. Mildred Breslau	
1976	Family Plot	Mrs. Maloney	
1981	Time Bandits	Mrs. Ogre	
1985	Brazil	Mrs. Ida Lowry	
1985	Shadey	Lady Constance Landau	British film
1987	Overboard	Edith Mintz	
1988	Lady in White	Amanda Harper	Nominated — Saturn Award for Best Supporting Actress (1990)
1992	Inside Monkey Zetterland	Honor Zetterland	
1998	Fear and Loathing in Las Vegas	Desk Clerk at Mint Hotel	
2006	Cars	Lizzie	Voice role
2011	Cars 2	Lizzie	Voice role
2017	Cars 3	Lizzie	Voice role
2018	Frank & Ava	Betty Burns	Final film role

=== Television ===
Year	Title	Role	Notes
1962	Car 54, Where Are You?	Betty Lou Creco (uncredited)	1 episode
1972	Gunsmoke	Ena Spratt in "The Judgment."	1 episode
1973	The Bob Newhart Show	Dr. A.J. Webster	1 episode
1974	Mannix	Mrs. Sylvia Jarrud/Martha Cole	
1974	The Rookies	Molly Phillips - Season 3, Episode 10	
1974	The Autobiography of Miss Jane Pittman	Lady at House	TV film
1974	Larry	Maureen Whitten	TV film
1975	The Legend of Lizzie Borden	Emma Borden	TV film
1975	The Six Million Dollar Man	Middy	Episode: "The White Lightning War"
1975	The Rookies	Joyce Lanson	Season 4 Episode 7 "The Death Lady"
1977–81	Soap	Jessica Tate	85 episodes Won — Golden Globe Award for Best Actress – Television Series Musical or Comedy (1980); Nominated — Emmy Award for Outstanding Lead Actress in a Comedy Series (1978–1981)
1979	$weepstake$	Sarah	Episode: "Lynn and Grover and Joey"
1979–83	Benson	Jessica Tate	2 episodes also as director
1982	Rosie: The Rosemary Clooney Story	Frances Clooney	TV film
1983	Faerie Tale Theatre	Jack's mother	1 episode
1984–92	Who's the Boss?	Mona Robinson	196 episodes Won — Golden Globe Award for Best Supporting Actress – Series, Miniseries or Television Film (1989); Nominated — Golden Globe Award for Best Supporting Actress – Series, Miniseries or Television Film (1986); Nominated — Emmy Award for Outstanding Supporting Actress in a Comedy Series (1988–1989)
1986	Girls on Top	Mrs DuPont	1 episode "Mr Yummie Brownie"
1993	The Upper Hand	Madame Alexandra	1 episode "Tunnel of Love"
1995–97	Coach	Doris Sherman	11 episodes
1996–2004	Everybody Loves Raymond	Lois Whelan	14 episodes Nominated — Emmy Award for Outstanding Guest Actress in a Comedy Series (2002)
2002	Mr. St. Nick	Queen Carlotta	TV film
2007	A Grandpa for Christmas	Roxanne "Roxie" Ritter	TV film
2010	Pound Puppies	Mildred	1 episode "My Fair Rebound"
2010	The Glades	Evelyn	1 episode
2010	Melissa & Joey	Mrs. Geller	1 episode
2011	True Blood	Caroline Bellefleur	1 episode
2011	Harry's Law	Mrs. Gold	1 episode
2012	Cars Toons: Mater's Tall Tales	Lizzie (voice)	Episode: "Time Travel Mater"
