= Madylin Sweeten =

American actress (born 1991)

- Born: Brownwood, Texas, U.S.
- Occupation: Actress
- Years active: 1996–present
- Spouse: Sean Durrie
- Children: 1
- Relatives: Sawyer Sweeten (brother)

Madylin Sweeten is an American actress, best known for her portrayal of Ally Barone on the CBS family sitcom Everybody Loves Raymond (1996–2005).

== Early life ==
Sweeten was born in Brownwood, Brown County, Texas, the eldest of four children born to Timothy Lynn "Tim" Sweeten and Elizabeth Anne Gini (nee Millsap). She is the sister to Sullivan and Sawyer Sweeten, who co-starred in the American sitcom Everybody Loves Raymond.

== Personal life ==
Sweeten married Sean Durrie in 2018 and has a son born in 2025.

== Filmography ==
Film and television
Year	Title	Role	Notes
1996	A Promise to Carolyn	Young Debra	TV movie
1996–2005	Everybody Loves Raymond	Ally Barone	Main & Recurring Cast
1998	The Christmas Path	Dora	TV movie
1999	A Dog of Flanders	Young Aloise	Movie
1999	Toy Story 2	Additional Voices	Movie
2001	Ask Me No Questions		TV movie
2003	American Splendor	Danielle	Movie
2008	Eagle Eye	Becky	Movie
2013	The Next Steps	Denise	1 episode
2013	Christmas Party Conversations: Part II	Party Girl #2	Short
2013–2015	TMI Hollywood	Various/Herself-Sketch Actor	32 episodes
2014	Wedding Frisk	Sarah	Short executive producer and co-writer
2014	Human Centipede 3 Parody with Bree Olson	Mad Doctor	Short
2014	The 5 Minute Sketch Show		2 episodes
2014	Our Friends Are F*cking		Short
2015	Spare Change	Claire	Movie
2015	Mommy		Short executive producer
2015	Bree Does Comedy	Denise	1 episode
2015	After Dark with Julian Clan		1 episode
2015	Kim Jong-Un Hosts the Tonight Show	Lena Dunham	Video short
2016	Mildred and Maggie	Maggie	1 episode
2016	Sam and Me	Lauren Frederick	Movie
2016	Games Gone Wrong	Jane	6 episodes
2017	Catalyst	Christine	Short
2017	New Years Eve	Girlfriend	Short
2017	Grey's Anatomy	Quiet Interviewee	1 episode
2017	Choice		Short
2019	Lucifer	Talkative Young Lass	1 episode
2026	Abbott Elementary	Sally	1 episode
