= List of Everybody Loves Raymond episodes =

The CBS sitcom television series Everybody Loves Raymond aired 210 episodes throughout its 9-season run, from September 13, 1996, to May 16, 2005. The series follows the life of Ray Romano as the titular Newsday sportswriter Ray Barone and how he handles conflicts with his neurotic family, including wife Debra (Patricia Heaton), mother Marie (Doris Roberts), father Frank (Peter Boyle), brother Robert (Brad Garrett), daughter Ally (Madylin Sweeten), and twin boys Michael and Geoffrey (Sullivan and Sawyer Sweeten).

Although originally suffering low ratings due to being in the Friday night death slot, Everybody Loves Raymond, after its move to Monday night in March 1997, rose up to tying with Friends and Monday Night Football in the 2000–01 television season. The show was also critically acclaimed and won 15 Primetime Emmy Awards, including Outstanding Comedy Series in 2003 and 2005. The series has been ranked the 60th best of all time by TV Guide and the eleventh-best sitcom starring a stand-up comedian by Rolling Stone, with the episode "Marie's Sculpture" on TV Guide's 2009 all-time list of 100 Greatest Episodes at number 42. Each season has been released on DVD, with a few compilation DVDs and complete series sets also issued.

== Series overview ==
Season	Episodes	Originally released		Rank	Rating (Note: Figures for season 1 are in households, while figures for seasons 2-9 are in viewers (millions))
Season	Episodes	First released	Last released	Rank	Rating
1	22	September 13, 1996	April 7, 1997	84	7.8
2	25	September 22, 1997	May 18, 1998	33	13.3
3	26	September 21, 1998	May 24, 1999	10	15.5
4	24	September 20, 1999	May 22, 2000	12	17.1
5	25	October 2, 2000	May 21, 2001	5	19.1
6	24	September 24, 2001	May 20, 2002	4	20.0
7	25	September 23, 2002	May 19, 2003	7	18.6
8	23	September 22, 2003	May 24, 2004	9	17.4
9	16	September 20, 2004	May 16, 2005	9	16.9

== Episodes ==
=== Season 1 (1996–97) ===
No. overall	No. in season	Title	Directed by	Written by	Original release date	Prod. code	U.S. viewers (millions)
1	1	"Pilot"	Michael Lembeck	Philip Rosenthal	September 13, 1996	9601	8.8
2	2	"I Love You"	Paul Lazarus	Philip Rosenthal	September 20, 1996	9602	9.9
3	3	"I Wish I Were Gus"	Paul Lazarus	Kathy Ann Stumpe	September 27, 1996	9604	8.9
4	4	"Standard Deviation"	Jeff Meyer	Steve Skrovan	October 4, 1996	9605	9.3
5	5	"Look, Don't Touch"	Jeff Meyer	Lew Schneider	October 11, 1996	9606	9.5
6	6	"Frank, the Writer"	Paul Lazarus	Tucker Cawley	October 18, 1996	9603	8.8
7	7	"Your Place or Mine?"	Howard Storm	Jeremy Stevens	October 28, 1996	9607	12.8
8	8	"In-Laws"	Alan Kirschenbaum	Philip Rosenthal	November 1, 1996	9608	10.2
9	9	"Win, Lose or Draw"	Alan Kirschenbaum	Story by : Stephen Nathan & Kathy Ann Stumpe; Teleplay by : Kathy Ann Stumpe	November 8, 1996	9609	9.8
10	10	"Turkey or Fish"	Michael Lembeck	Tucker Cawley	November 22, 1996	9611	9.0
11	11	"Captain Nemo"	Michael Lembeck	Lew Schneider & Steve Skrovan	December 13, 1996	9610	7.1
12	12	"The Ball"	Jeff Meyer	Bruce Kirschbaum	December 20, 1996	9613	8.3
13	13	"Debra's Sick"	Michael Lembeck	Stephen Nathan	January 3, 1997	9612	9.62
14	14	"Who's Handsome?"	Howard Storm	Carol Gary	January 17, 1997	9614	9.44
15	15	"The Car"	Howard Storm	Lew Schneider	January 31, 1997	9615	10.11
16	16	"Diamonds"	Michael Lembeck	Kathy Ann Stumpe	February 7, 1997	9617	10.02
17	17	"The Game"	Jeff Meyer	Tucker Cawley	February 21, 1997	9616	9.30
18	18	"Recovering Pessimist"	Jeff Meyer	Steve Skrovan	February 28, 1997	9618	8.96
19	19	"The Dog"	Rod Daniel	Bruce Kirschbaum	March 3, 1997	9619	17.17
20	20	"Neighbors"	Jeff Meyer	Jeremy Stevens	March 10, 1997	9620	14.69
21	21	"Fascinatin' Debra"	Jeff Meyer	Story by : Kathy Ann Stumpe & Lew Schneider; Teleplay by : Jeremy Stevens & Tucker Cawley	March 17, 1997	9621	13.75
22	22	"Why Are We Here?"	Jeff Meyer	Ray Romano & Tom Paris	April 7, 1997	9622	14.33

=== Season 2 (1997–98) ===
No. overall	No. in season	Title	Directed by	Written by	Original release date	Prod. code	U.S. viewers (millions)
23	1	"Ray's on TV"	Michael Lessac	Tucker Cawley	September 22, 1997	9701	12.64
24	2	"Father Knows Least"	Michael Lessac	Lew Schneider	September 29, 1997	9702	15.30
25	3	"Brother"	Michael Lessac	Jeremy Stevens	October 6, 1997	9703	13.12
26	4	"Mozart"	Ellen Gittelsohn	Philip Rosenthal	October 13, 1997	9705	14.10
27	5	"Golf"	Ellen Gittelsohn	Ray Romano & Tom Caltabiano & Kevin James	October 20, 1997	9704	14.13
28	6	"Anniversary"	Ellen Gittelsohn	Kathy Ann Stumpe	October 27, 1997	9706	14.62
29	7	"Working Late Again"	Will Mackenzie	Ellen Sandler & Cindy Chupack	November 3, 1997	9707	14.68
30	8	"The Children's Book"	Will Mackenzie	Steve Skrovan	November 10, 1997	9708	14.50
31	9	"The Gift"	Will Mackenzie	Ellen Sandler & Cindy Chupack	November 17, 1997	9709	13.97
32	10	"High School"	Gary Halvorson	Lew Schneider	November 24, 1997	9710	14.31
33	11	"The Letter"	Gary Halvorson	Kathy Ann Stumpe	December 8, 1997	9711	13.23
34	12	"All I Want for Christmas"	Jeff Meyer	Steve Skrovan	December 15, 1997	9713	11.28
35	13	"Civil War"	Gary Halvorson	Tucker Cawley	January 5, 1998	9712	14.91
36	14	"Mia Famiglia"	Brian K. Roberts	Ellen Sandler & Cindy Chupack	January 12, 1998	9714	15.20
37	15	"Marie's Meatballs"	Brian K. Roberts	Susan Van Allen	January 19, 1998	9715	13.68
38	16	"The Checkbook"	John Fortenberry	Tom Caltabiano	February 2, 1998	9716	14.02
39	17	"The Ride-Along"	John Fortenberry	Jeremy Stevens	February 23, 1998	9717	14.54
40	18	"The Family Bed"	Steve Zuckerman	Steve Skrovan	March 2, 1998	9718	15.05
41	19	"Good Girls"	Joyce Gittlin	Tucker Cawley	March 9, 1998	9719	15.54
42	20	"T-Ball"	Jeff Melman	Lew Schneider	April 6, 1998	9720	13.56
43	21	"Traffic School"	John Fortenberry	Kathy Ann Stumpe	April 20, 1998	9721	11.69
44	22	"Six Feet Under"	Jeff Melman	Cindy Chupack & Steve Skrovan & Tom Caltabiano	April 27, 1998	9722	13.03
45	23	"The Garage Sale"	Jeff Melman	Ellen Sandler & Jeremy Stevens & Lew Schneider & Tucker Cawley	May 4, 1998	9723	11.74
46	24	"The Wedding: Part I"	Jeff Melman	Ray Romano & Philip Rosenthal	May 11, 1998	9724	12.62
47	25	"The Wedding: Part II"	Jeff Melman	Ray Romano & Philip Rosenthal	May 18, 1998	9725	11.87

=== Season 3 (1998–99) ===
No. overall	No. in season	Title	Directed by	Written by	Original release date	Prod. code	U.S. viewers (millions)
48	1	"The Invasion"	Will Mackenzie	Ellen Sandler	September 21, 1998	9801	14.83
49	2	"Driving Frank"	Will Mackenzie	Cindy Chupack	September 28, 1998	9802	14.07
50	3	"The Sitter"	Will Mackenzie	Lew Schneider	October 5, 1998	9803	14.13
51	4	"Getting Even"	Steve Zuckerman	Steve Skrovan	October 12, 1998	9804	14.37
52	5	"The Visit"	Richard Marion	Susan Van Allen	October 19, 1998	9806	14.56
53	6	"Halloween Candy"	Steve Zuckerman	Steve Skrovan	October 26, 1998	9805	14.99
54	7	"Moving Out"	Will Mackenzie	Tucker Cawley	November 2, 1998	9807	14.60
55	8	"The Article"	Will Mackenzie	Tom Caltabiano	November 9, 1998	9808	15.68
56	9	"The Lone Barone"	Will Mackenzie	Tom Caltabiano & Jeremy Stevens	November 16, 1998	9809	17.02
57	10	"No Fat"	Steve Zuckerman	Ellen Sandler & Susan Van Allen	November 23, 1998	9810	16.41
58	11	"The Apartment"	Steve Zuckerman	Kathy Ann Stumpe	December 7, 1998	9811	15.21
59	12	"The Toaster"	Steve Zuckerman	Philip Rosenthal	December 14, 1998	9812	15.89
60	13	"Ping Pong"	Will Mackenzie	Aaron Shure	January 11, 1999	9814	17.09
61	14	"Pants on Fire"	Will Mackenzie	Tucker Cawley	January 18, 1999	9813	18.78
62	15	"Robert's Date"	Will Mackenzie	Jeremy Stevens	February 1, 1999	9815	18.04
63	16	"Frank's Tribute"	Will Mackenzie	Eric Cohen	February 8, 1999	9816	14.53
64	17	"Cruising with Marie"	Richard Marion	Steve Skrovan & Susan Van Allen	February 15, 1999	9817	16.70
65	18	"Ray Home Alone"	Steve Zuckerman	Tom Caltabiano & Tucker Cawley & Ray Romano	February 22, 1999	9818	15.12
66	19	"Big Shots"	Steve Zuckerman	Jason Gelles & Mike Haukom	March 1, 1999	9819	15.39
67	20	"Move Over"	Will Mackenzie	Kathy Ann Stumpe	March 15, 1999	9820	18.02
68	21	"The Getaway"	Steve Zuckerman	Cindy Chupack	April 5, 1999	9821	16.65
69	22	"Working Girl"	Michael Zinberg	Cindy Chupack & Kathy Ann Stumpe	April 26, 1999	9823	16.46
70	23	"Be Nice"	Steve Zuckerman	Lew Schneider	May 3, 1999	9822	14.29
71	24	"Dancing with Debra"	Brian K. Roberts	Aaron Shure & Steve Skrovan	May 10, 1999	9824	15.09
72	25	"Robert Moves Back"	Brian K. Roberts	Lew Schneider & Aaron Shure	May 17, 1999	9825	15.07
73	26	"How They Met"	Gary Halvorson	Ray Romano & Philip Rosenthal	May 24, 1999	9826	13.36

=== Season 4 (1999–2000) ===
No. overall	No. in season	Title	Directed by	Written by	Original release date	Prod. code	U.S. viewers (millions)
74	1	"Boob Job"	Will Mackenzie	Lew Schneider	September 20, 1999	9901	18.39
75	2	"The Can Opener"	Will Mackenzie	Aaron Shure & Susan Van Allen	September 27, 1999	9903	18.17
76	3	"You Bet"	Will Mackenzie	Ellen Sandler & Steve Skrovan	October 4, 1999	9902	15.76
77	4	"Sex Talk"	Will Mackenzie	Tod Himmel & Lisa K. Nelson	October 11, 1999	9904	17.72
78	5	"The Will"	Will Mackenzie	Story by : Michael Feldman and Jennifer Crittenden; Teleplay by : Jennifer Crittenden	October 18, 1999	9905	16.73
79	6	"The Sister"	Will Mackenzie	Kathy Ann Stumpe	October 25, 1999	9906	17.29
80	7	"Cousin Gerard"	Will Mackenzie	Jason Gelles & Mike Haukom	November 8, 1999	9907	16.15
81	8	"Debra's Workout"	Will Mackenzie	Tom Caltabiano & Ray Romano & Mike Royce	November 15, 1999	9908	16.94
82	9	"No Thanks"	Will Mackenzie	Tucker Cawley & Jeremy Stevens	November 22, 1999	9909	17.37
83	10	"Left Back"	Will Mackenzie	Philip Rosenthal	November 29, 1999	9910	17.72
84	11	"The Christmas Picture"	Will Mackenzie	Lew Schneider	December 13, 1999	9911	18.52
85	12	"What's with Robert?"	Will Mackenzie	Cindy Chupack	January 10, 2000	9912	20.79
86	13	"Bully on the Bus"	Will Mackenzie	Tucker Cawley	January 17, 2000	9913	19.01
87	14	"Prodigal Son"	Will Mackenzie	Steve Skrovan	January 31, 2000	9914	18.53
88	15	"Robert's Rodeo"	Will Mackenzie	Jennifer Crittenden	February 7, 2000	9915	16.15
89	16	"The Tenth Anniversary"	Will Mackenzie	Aaron Shure	February 14, 2000	9916	17.74
90	17	"Hackidu"	Will Mackenzie	Lew Schneider & Steve Skrovan	February 21, 2000	9917	17.92
91	18	"Debra Makes Something Good"	Will Mackenzie	Kathy Ann Stumpe	February 28, 2000	9918	17.53
92	19	"Marie and Frank's New Friends"	Steve Zuckerman	Mike Royce	March 20, 2000	9919	18.39
93	20	"Alone Time"	Steve Zuckerman	Jennifer Crittenden	April 17, 2000	9920	17.69
94	21	"Someone's Cranky"	Steve Zuckerman	Tucker Cawley	May 1, 2000	9921	17.13
95	22	"Bad Moon Rising"	David Lee	Ray Romano & Philip Rosenthal	May 8, 2000	9922	17.12
96	23	"Confronting the Attacker"	Brian K. Roberts	Lew Schneider & Kathy Ann Stumpe	May 15, 2000	9923	16.72
97	24	"Robert's Divorce"	Wil Shriner	Tucker Cawley & Jennifer Crittenden & Steve Skrovan	May 22, 2000	9924	18.52

=== Season 5 (2000–01) ===
No. overall	No. in season	Title	Directed by	Written by	Original release date	Prod. code	U.S. viewers (millions)
98	1	"Italy"	Gary Halvorson	Philip Rosenthal	October 2, 2000	0001	22.01
99	2	"Italy"	Gary Halvorson	Philip Rosenthal	October 2, 2000	0002	22.01
100	3	"Wallpaper"	Gary Halvorson	Lew Schneider	October 9, 2000	0003	19.92
101	4	"Meant to Be"	Michael Zinberg	Jennifer Crittenden & Kathy Ann Stumpe	October 16, 2000	0004	21.26
102	5	"Pet Cemetery"	Ken Levine	Steve Skrovan	October 23, 2000	0005	19.64
103	6	"The Author"	Andy Ackerman	Mike Royce	October 30, 2000	0006	20.23
104	7	"The Walk to the Door"	Asaad Kelada	Tucker Cawley	November 6, 2000	0007	20.57
105	8	"Young Girl"	Michael Zinberg	Tom Caltabiano & Aaron Shure	November 13, 2000	0009	20.52
106	9	"Fighting In-Laws"	Michael Zinberg	Kathy Ann Stumpe	November 20, 2000	0008	21.37
107	10	"The Sneeze"	Ken Levine	Aaron Shure & Steve Skrovan	November 27, 2000	0010	19.29
108	11	"Christmas Present"	Gary Halvorson	Kathy Ann Stumpe	December 11, 2000	0011	21.25
109	12	"What Good Are You?"	Ken Levine	Jennifer Crittenden	January 8, 2001	0012	20.28
110	13	"Super Bowl"	Gary Halvorson	Story by : Joe Bolster and Ray Romano & Mike Royce; Teleplay by : Ray Romano & Mike Royce	January 29, 2001	0014	21.48
111	14	"Ray's Journal"	Kenneth Shapiro	Jennifer Crittenden	February 5, 2001	0013	21.13
112	15	"Silent Partners"	Gary Halvorson	Tucker Cawley	February 12, 2001	0016	18.56
113	16	"Fairies"	Gary Halvorson	Aaron Korsh	February 19, 2001	0015	18.38
114	17	"Stefania Arrives"	Gary Halvorson	Tucker Cawley & Lew Schneider	February 26, 2001	0017	18.08
115	18	"Humm Vac"	Gary Halvorson	Lew Schneider	March 19, 2001	0018	19.07
116	19	"The Canister"	Gary Halvorson	David Regal	April 9, 2001	0021	18.74
117	20	"Net Worth"	David Lee	Jason Gelles & Mike Haukom	April 23, 2001	0019	17.19
118	21	"Let's Fix Robert"	Gary Halvorson	Jennifer Crittenden & Mike Royce	April 30, 2001	0024	17.07
119	22	"Say Uncle"	Kenneth Shapiro	Aaron Shure	May 7, 2001	0022	18.34
120	23	"Separation"	Asaad Kelada	Philip Rosenthal	May 14, 2001	0023	17.22
121	24	"Frank Paints the House"	David Lee	Scott Buck	May 21, 2001	0020	20.13
122	25	"Ally's Birth"	Jerry Zaks	Tucker Cawley	May 21, 2001	0025	20.13

=== Season 6 (2001–02) ===
No. overall	No. in season	Title	Directed by	Written by	Original release date	Prod. code	U.S. viewers (millions)
123	1	"The Angry Family"	Gary Halvorson	Philip Rosenthal	September 24, 2001	0101	22.80
124	2	"No Roll"	Jerry Zaks	Aaron Shure	October 1, 2001	0102	22.46
125	3	"Odd Man Out"	Jerry Zaks	Steve Skrovan & Jeremy Stevens	October 8, 2001	0103	21.44
126	4	"Ray's Ring"	Kenneth Shapiro	Mike Royce	October 15, 2001	0104	21.63
127	5	"Marie's Sculpture"	Randy Suhr	Jennifer Crittenden	October 22, 2001	0105	21.21
128	6	"Frank Goes Downstairs"	Gary Halvorson	Jennifer Crittenden	October 29, 2001	0107	20.66
129	7	"Jealous Robert"	Gary Halvorson	Tom Caltabiano & Ray Romano	November 5, 2001	0106	21.72
130	8	"It's Supposed to Be Fun"	Gary Halvorson	Lew Schneider	November 12, 2001	0108	21.99
131	9	"Older Women"	Gary Halvorson	Tucker Cawley & Philip Rosenthal	November 19, 2001	0109	21.88
132	10	"Raybert"	Gary Halvorson	Steve Skrovan	November 26, 2001	0110	24.26
133	11	"The Kicker"	Gary Halvorson	Aaron Shure	December 10, 2001	0111	19.30
134	12	"Season's Greetings"	Jerry Zaks	Tucker Cawley	December 17, 2001	0112	22.20
135	13	"Tissues"	Jerry Zaks	Mike Royce	January 7, 2002	0113	22.28
136	14	"Snow Day"	Gary Halvorson	Kathy Ann Stumpe	January 14, 2002	0114	21.06
137	15	"Cookies"	Gary Halvorson	Steve Skrovan	January 28, 2002	0115	20.64
138	16	"Lucky Suit"	Gary Halvorson	Tucker Cawley	February 4, 2002	0116	20.94
139	17	"The Skit"	Gary Halvorson	Lew Schneider	February 25, 2002	0117	22.48
140	18	"The Breakup Tape"	Jerry Zaks	Tom Caltabiano & Aaron Shure	March 4, 2002	0118	21.63
141	19	"Talk to Your Daughter"	Jerry Zaks	Tucker Cawley & Ray Romano	March 18, 2002	0119	21.24
142	20	"A Vote for Debra"	Jerry Zaks	Lew Schneider & Steve Skrovan	March 25, 2002	0120	22.01
Special	TBA	"The First Six Years"	Kenneth Shapiro	Philip Rosenthal, Ray Romano & Tony DeSena	April 28, 2002	0125	16.32
143	21	"Call Me Mom"	Kenneth Shapiro	George B. White III & Joe Rubin	April 29, 2002	0121	17.55
144	22	"Mother's Day"	Gary Halvorson	Jennifer Crittenden	May 6, 2002	0122	19.46
145	23	"The Bigger Person"	Gary Halvorson	Tucker Cawley & Lew Schneider	May 13, 2002	0124	19.41
146	24	"The First Time"	Gary Halvorson	Tom Caltabiano & Mike Royce & Ray Romano	May 20, 2002	0123	20.18

=== Season 7 (2002–03) ===
No. overall	No. in season	Title	Directed by	Written by	Original release date	Prod. code	U.S. viewers (millions)
147	1	"The Cult"	Kenneth Shapiro	Philip Rosenthal & Tucker Cawley	September 23, 2002	0201	23.27
148	2	"Counseling"	Kenneth Shapiro	Mike Royce	September 23, 2002	0202	24.04
149	3	"Homework"	Gary Halvorson	Jeremy Stevens	September 30, 2002	0203	21.96
150	4	"Pet the Bunny"	John Fortenberry	Aaron Shure	October 7, 2002	0204	19.87
151	5	"Who Am I?"	John Fortenberry	David Regal	October 14, 2002	0205	20.74
152	6	"Robert Needs Money"	Michael Zinberg	Tom Caltabiano	October 21, 2002	0206	21.54
153	7	"The Sigh"	Jerry Zaks	Steve Skrovan	November 4, 2002	0207	20.41
154	8	"The Annoying Kid"	Jerry Zaks	Lew Schneider	November 11, 2002	0208	20.76
155	9	"She's the One"	John Fortenberry	Ray Romano & Philip Rosenthal	November 18, 2002	0209	20.44
156	10	"Marie's Vision"	Sheldon Epps	Jay Kogen	November 25, 2002	0210	20.53
157	11	"The Thought That Counts"	Gary Halvorson	Tucker Cawley	December 9, 2002	0211	19.09
158	12	"Grandpa Steals"	Jerry Zaks	Lew Schneider	January 6, 2003	0213	19.71
159	13	"Somebody Hates Raymond"	Jerry Zaks	Steve Skrovan	January 27, 2003	0214	17.20
160	14	"Just a Formality"	Gary Halvorson	Philip Rosenthal & Steve Skrovan	February 3, 2003	0212	20.35
161	15	"The Disciplinarian"	Jerry Zaks	Mike Royce	February 10, 2003	0215	18.05
162	16	"Sweet Charity"	Jerry Zaks	Mike Royce & Lew Schneider	February 17, 2003	0216	17.46
163	17	"Meeting the Parents"	Jerry Zaks	Aaron Shure	February 24, 2003	0217	22.20
164	18	"The Plan"	Jerry Zaks	Tucker Cawley	March 10, 2003	0218	19.48
165	19	"Sleepover at Peggy's"	Gary Halvorson	Joe Rubin & George B. White III	March 31, 2003	0219	18.65
166	20	"Who's Next?"	Gary Halvorson	Story by : Miriam Trogdon; Teleplay by : Steve Skrovan	April 14, 2003	0220	17.72
167	21	"The Shower"	Jerry Zaks	Leslie Caveny	April 28, 2003	0223	17.93
168	22	"Baggage"	Gary Halvorson	Tucker Cawley	May 5, 2003	0221	19.59
169	23	"The Bachelor Party"	Gary Halvorson	Tom Caltabiano & Ray Romano & Mike Royce	May 12, 2003	0222	18.71
170	24	"Robert's Wedding"	Jerry Zaks	Philip Rosenthal	May 19, 2003	0224	22.68
171	25	"Robert's Wedding"	Jerry Zaks	Philip Rosenthal	May 19, 2003	0224	22.68

=== Season 8 (2003–04) ===
No. overall	No. in season	Title	Directed by	Written by	Original release date	Prod. code	U.S. viewers (millions)
172	1	"Fun with Debra"	Gary Halvorson	Mike Scully	September 22, 2003	0301	20.63
173	2	"Thank You Notes"	Kenneth Shapiro	Philip Rosenthal	September 29, 2003	0303	20.47
174	3	"Home From School"	Kenneth Shapiro	Steve Skrovan	October 6, 2003	0302	18.04
175	4	"Misery Loves Company"	Gary Halvorson	Aaron Shure	October 13, 2003	0304	18.18
176	5	"The Contractor"	Gary Halvorson	Mike Royce	October 20, 2003	0305	18.02
177	6	"Peter on the Couch"	Gary Halvorson	Steven James Meyer	November 3, 2003	0306	18.62
178	7	"Liars"	Kenneth Shapiro	Tucker Cawley	November 10, 2003	0307	19.25
179	8	"The Surprise Party"	Jerry Zaks	Lew Schneider	November 17, 2003	0308	19.44
180	9	"The Bird"	Kenneth Shapiro	Tucker Cawley & Mike Royce & Jeremy Stevens	November 24, 2003	0309	19.15
181	10	"Jazz Records"	Gary Halvorson	Tom Caltabiano	December 15, 2003	0310	18.05
182	11	"Debra at the Lodge"	Gary Halvorson	Lew Schneider	January 5, 2004	0311	19.10
183	12	"Slave"	Jerry Zaks	Leslie Caveny	January 12, 2004	0312	19.33
184	13	"Whose Side Are You On?"	Kenneth Shapiro	Mike Royce	February 2, 2004	0313	18.80
185	14	"Lateness"	Jerry Zaks	Steve Skrovan	February 9, 2004	0314	17.58
186	15	"Party Dress"	Kenneth Shapiro	Mike Scully	February 16, 2004	0315	19.80
187	16	"Security"	Gary Halvorson	Tucker Cawley	February 23, 2004	0317	17.80
188	17	"The Ingrate"	Gary Halvorson	Aaron Shure	March 1, 2004	0316	17.79
189	18	"Crazy Chin"	Gary Halvorson	Story by : Adam Lorenzo; Teleplay by : Tom Caltabiano & Mike Royce	March 22, 2004	0318	18.04
190	19	"The Nice Talk"	Brian K. Roberts	Steve Skrovan & Aaron Shure	April 19, 2004	0322	16.08
191	20	"Blabbermouths"	Gary Halvorson	Story by : Susan Van Allen; Teleplay by : Leslie Caveny & Jeremy Stevens & Mike Scully	May 3, 2004	0319	17.27
192	21	"The Model"	Gary Halvorson	Leslie Caveny	May 10, 2004	0321	16.93
193	22	"The Mentor"	Gary Halvorson	Tod Himmel	May 17, 2004	0320	16.07
194	23	"Golf for It"	Gary Halvorson	Tom Caltabiano & Tucker Cawley & Mike Royce	May 24, 2004	0323	18.33

=== Season 9 (2004–05) ===
No. overall	No. in season	Title	Directed by	Written by	Original release date	Prod. code	U.S. viewers (millions)
195	1	"The Home"	Kenneth Shapiro	Tucker Cawley & Jeremy Stevens	September 20, 2004	0401	17.99
196	2	"Not So Fast"	Gary Halvorson	Philip Rosenthal & Mike Royce	September 27, 2004	0402	18.69
197	3	"Angry Sex"	Kenneth Shapiro	Ray Romano & Lew Schneider & Mike Scully	October 4, 2004	0403	17.35
198	4	"P.T. & A."	Kenneth Shapiro	Tom Caltabiano	October 11, 2004	0404	17.97
199	5	"Ally's F"	Kenneth Shapiro	Steve Skrovan	October 18, 2004	0405	16.71
200	6	"Boys' Therapy"	Kenneth Shapiro	Philip Rosenthal	November 15, 2004	0406	17.80
201	7	"Debra's Parents"	Gary Halvorson	Leslie Caveny	November 22, 2004	0407	18.54
202	8	"A Job for Robert"	Gary Halvorson	Steven James Meyer	November 29, 2004	0408	18.71
203	9	"A Date for Peter"	Brian K. Roberts	Mike Royce	January 3, 2005	0409	18.84
204	10	"Favors"	Gary Halvorson	Aaron Shure	January 17, 2005	0410	19.25
205	11	"The Faux Pas"	Gary Halvorson	Lew Schneider	February 7, 2005	0411	17.49
206	12	"Tasteless Frank"	Gary Halvorson	Leslie Caveny and Steve Skrovan	February 14, 2005	0412	17.18
207	13	"Sister-in-Law"	Gary Halvorson	Tucker Cawley & Mike Royce & Tim Peach & Frank Pines	April 18, 2005	0415	16.96
208	14	"The Power of No"	Andy Ackerman	Tucker Cawley & Aaron Shure	May 2, 2005	0414	19.42
209	15	"Pat's Secret"	Gary Halvorson	Tucker Cawley	May 9, 2005	0413	19.79
210	16	"The Finale"	Gary Halvorson	Philip Rosenthal, Ray Romano, Tucker Cawley, Lew Schneider, Steve Skrovan, Jeremy Stevens, Mike Royce, Aaron Shure, Tom Caltabiano & Leslie Caveny	May 16, 2005	0416	32.94

== Ratings ==
Everybody Loves Raymond : U.S. viewers per episode (millions)

Season	Episode number																									
Season	1	2	3	4	5	6	7	8	9	10	11	12	13	14	15	16	17	18	19	20	21	22	23	24	25	26
1	8.8	9.9	8.9	9.3	9.5	8.8	12.8	10.2	9.8	9.0	7.1	8.3	9.62	9.44	10.11	10.02	9.30	8.96	17.17	14.69	13.75	14.33	–			
2	12.64	15.30	13.12	14.10	14.13	14.62	14.68	14.50	13.97	14.31	13.23	11.28	14.91	15.20	13.68	14.02	14.54	15.05	15.54	13.56	11.69	13.03	11.74	12.62	11.87	–
3	14.83	14.07	14.13	14.37	14.56	14.99	14.60	15.68	17.02	16.41	15.21	15.89	17.09	18.78	18.04	14.53	16.70	15.12	15.39	18.02	16.65	16.46	14.29	15.09	15.07	13.36
4	18.39	18.17	15.76	17.72	16.73	17.29	16.15	16.94	17.37	17.72	18.52	20.79	19.01	18.53	16.15	17.74	17.92	17.53	18.39	17.69	17.13	17.12	16.72	18.52	–	
5	22.01	22.01	19.92	21.26	19.64	20.23	20.57	20.52	21.37	19.29	21.25	20.28	21.48	21.13	18.56	18.38	18.08	19.07	18.74	17.19	17.07	18.34	17.22	20.13	20.13	–
6	22.80	22.46	21.44	21.63	21.21	20.66	21.72	21.99	21.88	24.26	19.30	22.20	22.28	21.06	20.64	20.94	22.48	21.63	21.24	22.01	17.55	19.46	19.41	20.18	–	
7	23.27	24.04	21.96	19.87	20.74	21.54	20.41	20.76	20.44	20.53	19.09	19.71	17.20	20.35	18.05	17.46	22.20	19.48	18.65	17.72	17.93	19.59	18.71	22.68	22.68	–
8	20.63	20.47	18.04	18.18	18.02	18.62	19.25	19.44	19.15	18.05	19.10	19.33	18.80	17.58	19.80	17.80	17.79	18.04	16.08	17.27	16.93	16.07	18.33	–		
9	17.99	18.69	17.35	17.97	16.71	17.80	18.54	18.71	18.84	19.25	17.49	17.18	16.96	19.42	19.79	32.94	–									

Audience measurement performed by Nielsen Media Research (Note: The viewership statistics in the graph and table are sourced from the citations in the season-specific tables above.)
