= Everybody Loves Raymond season 9 =

Everybody Loves Raymond
- Season 9
- DVD cover
- Starring: Ray Romano; Patricia Heaton; Brad Garrett; Monica Horan; Madylin Sweeten; Doris Roberts; Peter Boyle
- No. of episodes: 16

Release
- Original network: CBS
- Original release: September 20, 2004 – May 16, 2005

Season chronology
- ← Previous; Season 8

The ninth and final season of the American sitcom Everybody Loves Raymond aired on CBS from September 20, 2004, to May 16, 2005.

== Cast ==
=== Main ===
- Ray Romano as Raymond "Ray" Barone
- Patricia Heaton as Debra (née Whelan) Barone
- Brad Garrett as Robert Barone
- Doris Roberts as Marie Barone
- Peter Boyle as Francis "Frank" Barone
- Monica Horan as Amy McDougall/Barone
- Madylin Sweeten as Alexandra "Ally" Barone
- Sawyer Sweeten and Sullivan Sweeten as Geoffrey Barone and Michael Barone

=== Recurring ===
- Georgia Engel as Pat MacDougall
- Fred Willard as Hank MacDougall
- Chris Elliott as Peter MacDougall
- Andy Kindler as Andy
- Jon Manfrellotti as Gianni
- Tom McGowan as Bernie Gruenfelder
- Katherine Helmond as Lois Whelan
- Robert Culp as Warren Whelan
- Amy Aquino as Peggy
- Albert Romano as Albert
- Alex Meneses as Stefania Fogagnolo
- Robert Joy as Mr. Putnam

== Awards ==
Rosenthal's speech for the season winning an Emmy for Best Comedy Series was placed on a 2012 Entertainment Weekly list of "17 Greatest Emmy TV Moments."

== Episodes ==
No. overall	No. in season	Title	Directed by	Written by	Original release date	Prod. code	U.S. viewers (millions)
195	1	"The Home"	Kenneth Shapiro	Tucker Cawley & Jeremy Stevens	September 20, 2004	0401	17.99
Frank and Marie return from a trip down to a retirement home in New Jersey, where they end up making plans to live. Ray, Robert, Debra and Amy are all thrilled by the possibility of the two leaving, but when Frank and Marie actually move, there is a strange sadness in the air. Robert and Amy get Marie and Frank's house for $26,000.
196	2	"Not So Fast"	Gary Halvorson	Philip Rosenthal & Mike Royce	September 27, 2004	0402	18.69
When Ray and Debra visit Frank and Marie's condo, they learn that the owners are going to kick them out due to their annoying behavior. Robert and Amy are now forced to live with Marie and Frank when they return to their house.
197	3	"Angry Sex"	Kenneth Shapiro	Ray Romano & Lew Schneider & Mike Scully	October 4, 2004	0403	17.35
When Debra and Marie have a big fight, Ray is struck with worry when he thinks Debra's anger will cause her to forget about their sex that night. Much to his surprise, he finds that this "angry sex" is better than ever, and goes to great lengths to keep the feud between Debra and Marie going, making Debra's rage grow more.
198	4	"P.T. & A."	Kenneth Shapiro	Tom Caltabiano	October 11, 2004	0404	17.97
After being chided for wearing a shoddy shirt and getting stains on it, Ray lies and tells Debra that members of the PTA called her outfit "trampy." Debra plans to "get back" at the women by hosting a PTA meeting in her home and dressing as provocatively as possible. When Ray finally admits that he lied, Debra gets humiliated at the PTA meeting, and then gets mad at Ray.
199	5	"Ally's F"	Kenneth Shapiro	Steve Skrovan	October 18, 2004	0405	16.71
After Ally comes home with an "F" on her report card, Debra feels she is not paying enough attention, so she and Ray visit her math teacher, Mr. Putnam. Ray is left unimpressed, believing that Mr. Putnam is mean and takes his frustrations out on the kids. Debra later discovers from Amy that Ally has a crush on one of her classmates and blames that for causing the distraction. Debra decides to go and meet with Mr. Putnam again, only to discover that Ray was right about Mr. Putnam's attitude. She then has a heart-to heart with Ally about this.
200	6	"Boys' Therapy"	Kenneth Shapiro	Philip Rosenthal	November 15, 2004	0406	17.80
The women pressure Ray and Frank to accompany Robert to one of his therapy sessions. Instead, the men go to the tracks and it isn't long before the wives figure out their lie and as punishment, Debra doesn't let Ray touch her at bed, Marie makes no dinner for Frank and Amy is simply disappointed in Robert. The irony is that the men actually talked and communicated at the track more than they would have in therapy.
201	7	"Debra's Parents"	Gary Halvorson	Leslie Caveny	November 22, 2004	0407	18.54
Debra invites her divorced parents, Warren and Lois, to the family Thanksgiving. Ray walks in on them having sex. Debra thinks that they are getting back together and becomes very happy. But to her disappointment, they reveal that they are still divorced and they were just having some fun. Things get bad on the Thanksgiving day, when Debra walks in on them, and in a fit of rage, starts yelling at them. It turns worse when Amy's parents barge in while they are naked in the hallway, and Robert makes it into a catastrophe when he lies that he has a part in a local musical, making them leave.
202	8	"A Job for Robert"	Gary Halvorson	Steven James Meyer	November 29, 2004	0408	18.71
Marie is extra nice to Robert and Amy. Robert is happy until he discovers that Marie has been trying to manipulate him and Amy into having children (buying him candles, loose underwear and playing romantic music in their bedroom). Ray becomes jealous when Marie starts treating Robert better than she treats Ray. Marie then talks to Robert and explains her good intentions and says that he was always her favorite son, which no-one believes. Robert doesn't believe it either, but pretends to in order to continue the good treatment for a while.
203	9	"A Date for Peter"	Brian K. Roberts	Mike Royce	January 3, 2005	0409	18.84
Amy's parents ask Ray to give their son, Peter, some encouragement about his failing dating life. Ray arranges for a singles party for Peter and invites a few girls over. Debra invites Peggy, which angers Ray. He tries to push Stefania on Peter when he realizes that Peter is getting along well with Peggy. Finally Peter starts dating Peggy, much to Ray's dismay.
204	10	"Favors"	Gary Halvorson	Aaron Shure	January 17, 2005	0410	19.25
Debra complains to Ray about leaving things around the house and accidentally throws out a letter Ray got from Muhammad Ali. To save her from Ray's wrath, Marie takes the blame for the letter and as a return favor she blames Debra for throwing away Frank's old clothes. Debra confesses to Frank and she is forced to cover for Frank when he digs up Marie's rose bush. She gives up and tells Ray the truth. Marie then tells Debra that she bought Debra's birthday gift, because he forgot it. Marie's method of using favors to control them comes out in the open, but Marie tries to save herself by pretending to be sick and weak.
205	11	"The Faux Pas"	Gary Halvorson	Lew Schneider	February 7, 2005	0411	17.49
Ray accidentally insults the twins' new friend at a basketball game by making a joke about his father's profession. To rectify it he invites his friend's father and tries to apologize, but ends up insulting him more. His family walks in and it worsens the situation. Debra tries to rectify the situation, but makes it even worse with the biggest faux pas.
206	12	"Tasteless Frank"	Gary Halvorson	Leslie Caveny and Steve Skrovan	February 14, 2005	0412	17.18
Frank adds salt to Marie's lasagna one night. Marie becomes hysterically depressed, as her cooking has always been her strongest point. Ray and Robert soon discover that Frank has lost his sense of taste due to medicine he has been secretly taking to help his "foot" (His manhood), but when Frank calls Debra's cooking good, Marie freaks out. The word goes around and finally Marie finds out the real reason. She then tells him that she would rather have his taste back rather than a "good foot".
207	13	"Sister-in-Law"	Gary Halvorson	Tucker Cawley & Mike Royce & Tim Peach & Frank Pines	April 18, 2005	0415	16.96
Ray tells Robert that Amy talks too much after she chats with Ray for over an hour while he tries to watch a basketball game on television. Later that night, Robert tries to get Amy to talk less and tells her about Ray's comment. She then gets mad at Robert. At the party Amy apologizes to Ray, but Robert and Debra complain. Accidentally, Ray calls Amy annoying and she walks away, upset. When Ray goes to apologize, she calls Ray boring. Finally, they make-up.
208	14	"The Power of No"	Andy Ackerman	Tucker Cawley & Aaron Shure	May 2, 2005	0414	19.42
To gain power over Debra, Ray keeps turning down Debra for sex. She keeps doing nice things to make him happy because she thinks that Ray doesn't find her attractive anymore. When Debra finds out the truth, she returns the favour and they get into an ego battle over it, making a bet how much he would survive without sex. After 27 lousy nights, Ray finally gives up and admits defeat to have sex with her, but the kids arrive and Debra is forced to take care of them, much to Ray's dismay.
209	15	"Pat's Secret"	Gary Halvorson	Tucker Cawley	May 9, 2005	0413	19.79
Robert discovers Pat smoking, but promises not to tell, but this turns out bad when Marie catches him, and tells the whole family. The next day, his father-in-law accuses him of smoking, and starts lecturing him. Ray defends Robert by blabbing Pat's secret, and soon, everyone starts talking about the odd ways that they deal with stress.
210	16	"The Finale"	Gary Halvorson	Philip Rosenthal, Ray Romano, Tucker Cawley, Lew Schneider, Steve Skrovan, Jeremy Stevens, Mike Royce, Aaron Shure, Tom Caltabiano & Leslie Caveny	May 16, 2005	0416	32.94
Ray fears getting his adenoids removed, but Debra convinces him to go through with the surgery. In the waiting room, where the family is, Marie goes to the bathroom briefly. A nurse comes out with bad news, saying they're having trouble waking up Ray. 30 seconds later, a doctor comes out, saying Ray has finally woken up. Later on, whilst Marie and Frank are in bed together, Frank tells Marie what happened, while she was in the bathroom. Later on, everyone is in Ray and Debra's room, and Ray finds out what happened to him. Towards the end of the episode, everybody comes over for breakfast. Then the show slowly fades to black, ending the series.
