= Everybody Loves Raymond season 8 =

Everybody Loves Raymond
- Season 8
- DVD cover
- Starring: Ray Romano; Patricia Heaton; Brad Garrett; Monica Horan; Madylin Sweeten; Doris Roberts; Peter Boyle
- No. of episodes: 23

Release
- Original network: CBS
- Original release: September 22, 2003 – May 24, 2004

Season chronology
- ← Previous; Season 7 Next → Season 9

This is a list of episodes for the eighth season of Everybody Loves Raymond. The season consisted of 23 episodes and aired on CBS from September 22, 2003, to May 24, 2004.

== Production ==
The eighth season was produced by HBO Independent Productions, creator Philip Rosenthal's company Where's Lunch, and David Letterman's Worldwide Pants.

Ray Romano was paid $40 million to work on the season, or $1.8 million per episode, which made him the highest-paid television star at the time. Romano's contract renewal also included a deal that Romano would earn royalties through syndicated re-runs of older episodes. Co-star Brad Garrett, earning $150,000-$160,000 per episode, refused to show up for production and tapings unless CBS producers would negotiate a new contract with him; As a result, his character was written out of the first episode of the season.

The producers threatened to write out his character permanently, but when fellow cast-mates Patricia Heaton, Doris Roberts and Peter Boyle all called in sick the following week, CBS entered negotiations. Garrett's rep confirmed the cast had no problems with Ray personally, stating "Ray deserves every penny, all Brad wants is compensation commensurate with what other similarly situated actors have made in the past and are making today." Garrett's pay was later increased to $250,000 per episode, which was similar to Robert's and Boyle's pay, and was increased again to $315,000 per episode during the show's ninth season.

The new negotiations included deals on syndication, with each cast member (excluding Romano) receiving a 0.5% ownership of the show. Doris Roberts stated, "In the years to come, my grandchildren will always have some money coming in from syndication, and that's great." Ray Romano called the situation "inevitable," but also showed support for his cast-mates, stating, "When my salary came out in the papers, I knew stuff would happen. I'd do exactly the same thing."

== Cast ==
=== Main ===
- Ray Romano as Raymond "Ray" Barone
- Patricia Heaton as Debra (née Whelan) Barone
- Brad Garrett as Robert Barone
- Doris Roberts as Marie Barone
- Peter Boyle as Francis "Frank" Barone
- Madylin Sweeten as Alexandra "Ally" Barone
- Sawyer Sweeten and Sullivan Sweeten as Geoffrey Barone and Michael Barone

=== Supporting ===
- Monica Horan as Amy McDougall/Barone
- Georgia Engel as Pat MacDougall
- Fred Willard as Hank MacDougall
- Chris Elliott as Peter MacDougall
- Andy Kindler as Andy
- Jon Manfrellotti as Gianni
- Tom McGowan as Bernie Gruenfelder
- Maggie Wheeler as Linda Gruenfelder
- Katherine Helmond as Lois Whelan
- Victor Raider-Wexler as Stan
- Len Lesser as Garvin
- Amy Aquino as Peggy
- Alexandra Romano as Molly
- Albert Romano as Albert
- Max Rosenthal as Max
- Debra Mooney as Lee
- Bunny Levine as Hilda
- Norma Michaels as Mrs. Pechi
- Elsa Raven as Mrs. Lopman

== Episodes ==
No. overall	No. in season	Title	Directed by	Written by	Original release date	Prod. code	U.S. viewers (millions)
172	1	"Fun with Debra"	Gary Halvorson	Mike Scully	September 22, 2003	0301	20.63
When Ray has a nice time with the twins at the golf course, Debra decides to go with him too. Initially they have a lot of fun, with Debra complimenting Ray and Ray teaching Debra, having a good time with him. As the day progresses, they start fighting about golfing and Debra finally admits that she hates golfing. Note: As Robert and Amy are on their honeymoon, this is the only episode in the entire series that Brad Garrett (Robert) does not appear.
173	2	"Thank You Notes"	Kenneth Shapiro	Philip Rosenthal	September 29, 2003	0303	20.47
Robert and Amy are back from their honeymoon, and Marie tries to guilt Amy into writing thank you notes. When Amy answers back and Marie leaves, fuming. Debra takes this as an opportunity to team with her and sideline Marie altogether, but Ray and Robert are too afraid of Marie to team up with them. Marie hears about this and puts an end to it, turning Amy against Debra.
174	3	"Home From School"	Kenneth Shapiro	Steve Skrovan	October 6, 2003	0302	18.04
When Michael stays home from school for two days in a row for no obvious reason and then miss a third day of school, Ray makes Michael spend the day without television, games or comics to teach him a lesson. This leads him to confide why he doesn't want to return to class: he was teased for accidentally calling the teacher "Mommy" and crying about it. Ray then tells him an embarrassing story from his school days, which makes him return to school.
175	4	"Misery Loves Company"	Gary Halvorson	Aaron Shure	October 13, 2003	0304	18.18
Debra and Ray are annoyed at the over-the-top affection Robert and Amy express. Robert and Amy then give Ray marriage advice and Debra a book about it. This ticks off Ray and Debra and they make a scene at the dinner table. Marie then gives them both some sound marriage advice.
176	5	"The Contractor"	Gary Halvorson	Mike Royce	October 20, 2003	0305	18.02
Debra persuades Ray to hire Gianni to do some remodeling in their kitchen, but they both soon regret it due to his friend's laziness. Frank is upset about Ray hiring outside help and decides not to talk to him. Debra also recommends Gianni to Amy, but Robert also gets mad at him because of the laziness. When their new stove doesn't fit because of Gianni's faulty measuring, Debra decides to fire him but Ray refuses in defending his friend. In trying to force the new stove in, Ray throws his back out. When Gianni gives them a huge bill for the work, Ray gets mad, rips the bill in half, and they break off their friendship, although Gianni ends up returning to Ray's house to apologize and repair their friendship. All is going well, until Robert comes with the bill that Gianni was giving him for the repairs to Robert's place and Gianni takes off with Robert telling Ray: "You're next".
177	6	"Peter on the Couch"	Gary Halvorson	Steven James Meyer	November 3, 2003	0306	18.62
Amy's brother Peter visits Amy and just stays at their apartment. This makes Robert very uncomfortable and he convinces him to move back after an argument. Ray drives Peter back, and they discover that Hank and Pat have thrown away Peter's stuff and made a prayer room. Peter then returns to Long Island. He and Robert end up bonding over their common experiences as the eldest child and Robert decides to help Peter find a home in New York.
178	7	"Liars"	Kenneth Shapiro	Tucker Cawley	November 10, 2003	0307	19.25
Ray fakes a headache to get out of spending time with Marie and lies to her about it. This lie leads to a series of lies from Ray and Debra which leads to a huge mess. Marie finally cracks it, and then the lies of Robert and Amy and also Marie come out in the open.
179	8	"The Surprise Party"	Jerry Zaks	Lew Schneider	November 17, 2003	0308	19.44
Debra's mother suggests throwing Debra an "old-fashioned English tea party" for her birthday with Ray's help. When Debra discovers that Ray has some plan, she insists on a Chinese banquet instead. Ray lies to Lois and gets her to plan a Chinese party. During the party, Ray blurts out that Debra knows about the surprise and that the theme was her idea. When Debra walks in and acts surprised, she makes a fool of herself.
180	9	"The Bird"	Kenneth Shapiro	Tucker Cawley & Mike Royce & Jeremy Stevens	November 24, 2003	0309	19.15
At Thanksgiving at the McDougalls', Pat puts an injured bird out of its misery, much to everyone's despair. Soon, the families take sides during the live-action pageant of the First Thanksgiving.
181	10	"Jazz Records"	Gary Halvorson	Tom Caltabiano	December 15, 2003	0310	18.05
Thirty years ago, the furnace melted Frank’s favorite jazz records on Christmas, and Frank has never forgiven Ray for it. Ray attempts to make it up to him by buying him CDs of the same records, which Frank does not appreciate, having never used a CD player or liking how loud the audio of the music on the CD gets. Robert and Amy then find some old jazz records at the garage sales and Robert finally confesses that he was the one who long ago moved the records.
182	11	"Debra at the Lodge"	Gary Halvorson	Lew Schneider	January 5, 2004	0311	19.10
Debra accepts a position at Frank's lodge to help plan a member recruitment party, and quickly becomes very popular with the lodge brothers. Ray is upset about all the time Debra is spending away from home-and surprisingly, so is Frank, who dislikes his friends' treatment of his daughter-in-law. Marie and the wives of the lodgers are also upset about it, since the lodgers are coming home to them all "preheated", forcing Ray and Frank to tell her the truth.
183	12	"Slave"	Jerry Zaks	Leslie Caveny	January 12, 2004	0312	19.33
Debra and Ray accidentally leave Michael and Geoffrey home alone when they go to the grocery store. When they get home, they are surprised to find that Ally took over, cooking them breakfast and doing laundry. Debra quickly gets used to the idea of having Ally as her helper, but Marie accuses her of "enslaving" her granddaughter.
184	13	"Whose Side Are You On?"	Kenneth Shapiro	Mike Royce	February 2, 2004	0313	18.80
After realizing that Debra places bets with the kids on his questionable behavior traits, Ray is disgusted that his own children now think he's a "doof". He objects to the fact in Robert and Marie's presence. Their comments on it make Ray realize that Marie did the same with them in their childhood. Ray and Robert then try to bond with Frank.
185	14	"Lateness"	Jerry Zaks	Steve Skrovan	February 9, 2004	0314	17.58
Fed up with his wife's constant lateness, Ray makes a deal with Debra on ESPY awards night. Debra keeps up her end of the deal, but in the end, a curling iron gets stuck to her hair and she comes out to ask for Ray's help. She then realizes that she was a minute late and Ray has driven off without her. Ray finally realizes his mistakes and comes home to find Debra in her formal dress with the curling iron still stuck to her hair.
186	15	"Party Dress"	Kenneth Shapiro	Mike Scully	February 16, 2004	0315	19.80
Ray and Debra disagree over whether they should purchase an expensive dress for Ally to wear to a friend's formal 13th birthday party, which costs $250. When all the other family members agree with Ray, Debra gives in. When Ally refuses to go the party, Ray buys her the dress.
187	16	"Security"	Gary Halvorson	Tucker Cawley	February 23, 2004	0317	17.80
After Robert takes a second job selling home security systems, he reveals he's been asked to join the security firm full-time. He is unable to decide whether he should quit the police force. He asks everyone for his or her opinion. Frank, Hank, Debra and Amy want him to continue as a cop, but Marie and Pat want him to quit. Finally Ray decides to interfere and convinces Robert in the basement to make his own opinion, and Robert decides to stay in the police force. Marie, who has been eavesdropping to the basement, starts to slowly walk to Ray in a rage.
188	17	"The Ingrate"	Gary Halvorson	Aaron Shure	March 1, 2004	0316	17.79
Ray hurts Debra's feelings when he forgets to thank her during an acceptance speech for an honorary degree. To make up for it, he thanks her in his column. This angers Marie and Robert. The entire family starts yelling at Ray and asks for credit in his life. He finally gives them all a sarcastic thank you, which they seem to like.
189	18	"Crazy Chin"	Gary Halvorson	Story by : Adam Lorenzo; Teleplay by : Tom Caltabiano & Mike Royce	March 22, 2004	0318	18.04
The MacDougalls notice that Robert touches food to his chin when he eats. Amy thinks it is a response to stress and tries to help out. Robert dislikes the fact that everyone considers him a "freak". Ray, Frank and Marie all recall when Robert first started doing the "chin thing", prompting Debra to piece together the origin of his habit.
190	19	"The Nice Talk"	Brian K. Roberts	Steve Skrovan & Aaron Shure	April 19, 2004	0322	16.08
The MacDougalls and the Barones attempt to bond over a 500-piece puzzle during Easter, but only Ray and Pat stay up to do it. While they work, they share private stories about themselves and their families. Soon, everyone is talking about their "weird" friendship. Ray tries to defend his sweet relationship with her only to realize that she is nice to everyone.
191	20	"Blabbermouths"	Gary Halvorson	Story by : Susan Van Allen; Teleplay by : Leslie Caveny & Jeremy Stevens & Mike Scully	May 3, 2004	0319	17.27
Debra shares Ray's "choo choo gone" dream with the girls, and Amy tells Robert. The guys make fun of Ray for dreaming about a train and he tells them that he was dreaming about a girl whose nickname was "Choo Choo." They then start talking about their wives. This snowballs into a lot of gossip and all their feelings get hurt.
192	21	"The Model"	Gary Halvorson	Leslie Caveny	May 10, 2004	0321	16.93
A modelling agent convinces Robert to pose for headshots with their "in-house" photographer. But when they later return to collect them, the agent has disappeared with Robert's $2000. Ray then photographs Robert to fool the family, which turn out to be very bad.
193	22	"The Mentor"	Gary Halvorson	Tod Himmel	May 17, 2004	0320	16.07
A young man, Sam, arrives at Frank's house and everyone is surprised when they fondly embrace. He explains Frank had been like a mentor to him. His sons scoff, claiming that gruff Frank cannot possibly be warm and kind, which hurts Frank's feelings. They then realize that Frank was rude to Sam too, but Sam actually appreciated it.
194	23	"Golf for It"	Gary Halvorson	Tom Caltabiano & Tucker Cawley & Mike Royce	May 24, 2004	0323	18.33
Marie tries to guilt Robert and Ray into helping her with a shelf-building project. The brothers band together to resist her, and go to get a prime spot on a golf course. While there, they engage in a long battle over who will take care of Marie when she becomes too old to live alone. They decide to golf for it. Finally the boys make Marie her shelf and Ray informs Debra that he won at golf and Marie is going to live with them after Frank dies.
