= List of awards and nominations received by Everybody Loves Raymond =

This is a list of awards and nominations received by Everybody Loves Raymond.

== American Film Institute ==
=== 2002 ===
- Comedy Series of the Year (nominated)
- Actor of the Year - Male - TV Series – Ray Romano (nominated)
- Actor of the Year - Female - TV Series – Doris Roberts (nominated)

=== 2003 ===
- TV Program of the Year (Top 10)
  "This modern classic consistently makes big comedy out of small things, and its laughs are often enriched with insights into family togetherness that many dramas struggle to characterize."

=== 2004 ===
- TV Program of the Year (Top 10)
  "Everybody Loves Raymond continues to tilt America's laugh meter as it enters its eighth season. The show's writers never fail to find timeless comedy in the simplest details of everyday life. Each member of this peerless comic cast makes the effort appear effortless, and together, they have become part of the nation's extended family."

== Emmy Awards ==
=== 1999 (Season 3) ===
Primetime Emmy Awards

- Outstanding Comedy Series (nominated)
- Outstanding Lead Actor in a Comedy Series – Ray Romano (nominated)
- Outstanding Lead Actress in a Comedy Series – Patricia Heaton (nominated)
- Outstanding Supporting Actor in a Comedy Series – Peter Boyle (nominated)
- Outstanding Supporting Actress in a Comedy Series – Doris Roberts (nominated)
- Outstanding Directing for a Comedy Series – Will Mackenzie for "Robert's Date" (nominated)

=== 2000 ===
Primetime Emmy Awards

- Outstanding Comedy Series (nominated)
- Outstanding Lead Actress in a Comedy Series – Patricia Heaton (won)
- Outstanding Lead Actor in a Comedy Series – Ray Romano (nominated)
- Outstanding Supporting Actor in a Comedy Series – Peter Boyle (nominated)
- Outstanding Supporting Actor in a Comedy Series – Brad Garrett (nominated)
- Outstanding Supporting Actress in a Comedy Series – Doris Roberts (nominated)
- Outstanding Directing for a Comedy Series – Will Mackenzie for "The Christmas Picture" (nominated)
- Outstanding Writing for a Comedy Series – Ray Romano and Philip Rosenthal for "Bad Moon Rising" (nominated)

Creative Arts Emmy Awards

- Outstanding Cinematography for a Multi-Camera Series – Episode: "Robert's Rodeo" (nominated)

=== 2001 ===
Primetime Emmy Awards

- Outstanding Comedy Series (nominated)
- Outstanding Lead Actress in a Comedy Series – Patricia Heaton (won)
- Outstanding Lead Actor in a Comedy Series – Ray Romano (nominated)
- Outstanding Supporting Actress in a Comedy Series – Doris Roberts (won)
- Outstanding Supporting Actor in a Comedy Series – Peter Boyle (nominated)

Creative Arts Emmy Awards

- Outstanding Multi-Camera Picture Editing for a Series – Episode: "Italy" (nominated)
- Outstanding Cinematography for a Multi-Camera Series – Episode: "Italy" (nominated)
- Outstanding Multi-Camera Sound Mixing for a Series or Special – Episode: "Italy" (won)

=== 2002 ===
Primetime Emmy Awards

- Outstanding Comedy Series (nominated)
- Outstanding Lead Actor in a Comedy Series – Ray Romano (won)
- Outstanding Supporting Actor in a Comedy Series – Brad Garrett (won)
- Outstanding Supporting Actress in a Comedy Series – Doris Roberts (won)
- Outstanding Supporting Actor in a Comedy Series – Peter Boyle (nominated)
- Outstanding Lead Actress in a Comedy Series – Patricia Heaton (nominated)
- Outstanding Writing for a Comedy Series – Philip Rosenthal for "The Angry Family" (nominated)
- Outstanding Writing for a Comedy Series – Jennifer Crittenden for "Marie's Sculpture" (nominated)

Creative Arts Emmy Awards

- Outstanding Guest Actress in a Comedy Series – Katherine Helmond (nominated)
- Outstanding Multi-Camera Picture Editing for a Series – Episode: "Talk to Your Daughter" (nominated)
- Outstanding Multi-Camera Sound Mixing for a Series or Special – Episode: "It's Supposed to Be Fun" (nominated)

=== 2003 ===
Primetime Emmy Awards

- Outstanding Comedy Series (won)
- Outstanding Supporting Actor in a Comedy Series – Brad Garrett (won)
- Outstanding Lead Actor in a Comedy Series – Ray Romano (nominated)
- Outstanding Supporting Actress in a Comedy Series – Doris Roberts (won)
- Outstanding Supporting Actor in a Comedy Series – Peter Boyle (nominated)
- Outstanding Lead Actress in a Comedy Series – Patricia Heaton (nominated)
- Outstanding Writing for a Comedy Series – Tucker Cawley for "Baggage" (won)
- Outstanding Writing for a Comedy Series – Mike Royce for "Counseling" (nominated)

Creative Arts Emmy Awards

- Outstanding Guest Actor in a Comedy Series – Fred Willard (nominated)
- Outstanding Guest Actress in a Comedy Series – Georgia Engel (nominated)
- Outstanding Multi-Camera Picture Editing for a Series – Episode: "She's the One" (nominated)
- Outstanding Cinematography for a Multi-Camera Series – Episode: "Just a Formality" (nominated)
- Outstanding Multi-Camera Sound Mixing for a Series or Special – Episode: "She's the One" (won)

=== 2004 ===
Primetime Emmy Awards

- Outstanding Comedy Series (nominated)
- Outstanding Lead Actress in a Comedy Series – Patricia Heaton (nominated)
- Outstanding Supporting Actor in a Comedy Series – Peter Boyle (nominated)
- Outstanding Supporting Actor in a Comedy Series – Brad Garrett (nominated)
- Outstanding Supporting Actress in a Comedy Series – Doris Roberts (nominated)

Creative Arts Emmy Awards

- Outstanding Guest Actor in a Comedy Series – Fred Willard (nominated)
- Outstanding Guest Actress in a Comedy Series – Georgia Engel (nominated)
- Outstanding Multi-Camera Picture Editing for a Series – Episode: "Golf for It" (nominated)
- Outstanding Multi-Camera Sound Mixing for a Series or Special – Episode: "The Model" (nominated)

=== 2005 ===
Primetime Emmy Awards

- Outstanding Comedy Series (won)
- Outstanding Supporting Actor in a Comedy Series – Brad Garrett (won)
- Outstanding Lead Actor in a Comedy Series – Ray Romano (nominated)
- Outstanding Supporting Actress in a Comedy Series – Doris Roberts (won)
- Outstanding Supporting Actor in a Comedy Series – Peter Boyle (nominated)
- Outstanding Lead Actress in a Comedy Series – Patricia Heaton (nominated)
- Outstanding Directing for a Comedy Series – Gary Halvorson for "The Finale" (nominated)
- Outstanding Writing for a Comedy Series – Philip Rosenthal, Ray Romano, Tucker Cawley, Lew Schneider, Steve Skrovan, Jeremy Stevens, Mike Royce, Aaron Shure, Tom Caltabiano, and Leslie Caveny for "The Finale" (nominated)

Creative Arts Emmy Awards

- Outstanding Guest Actor in a Comedy Series – Fred Willard (nominated)
- Outstanding Guest Actress in a Comedy Series – Georgia Engel (nominated)
- Outstanding Multi-Camera Picture Editing for a Series – Episode: "The Faux Pas" (nominated)
- Outstanding Cinematography for a Multi-Camera Series – Episode: "Pat's Secret" (nominated)
- Outstanding Multi-Camera Sound Mixing for a Series or Special – Episode: "Boys' Therapy" (nominated)

== Golden Globe Awards ==
=== 2000 ===
- Best Actor in a Television Series (Musical or Comedy) – Ray Romano (nominated)

=== 2001 ===
- Best Actor in a Television Series (Musical or Comedy) – Ray Romano (nominated)

== Producers Guild of America Awards ==
=== 2003 ===
- Best Television Producer of the Year Award – Episodic Comedy (nominated)

=== 2004 ===
- Best Television Producer of the Year Award – Episode Comedy (nominated)

== Satellite Awards ==
=== 2002 ===
- Best Television Series – Musical or Comedy (nominated)
- Best Actor in a Television Series (Musical or Comedy) – Ray Romano (nominated)

=== 2003 ===
- Best Supporting Actress in a Television Series (Musical or Comedy Series) – Doris Roberts (won)

== Screen Actors Guild Awards ==
=== 1999 ===
- Outstanding Performance by an Ensemble in a Comedy Series (nominated)

=== 2000 ===
- Outstanding Performance by an Ensemble in a Comedy Series (nominated)
- Outstanding Performance by a Male Actor in a Comedy Series – Ray Romano (nominated)

=== 2002 ===
- Outstanding Performance by an Ensemble in a Comedy Series (nominated)
- Outstanding Performance by a Male Actor in a Comedy Series – Peter Boyle (nominated)
- Outstanding Performance by a Male Actor in a Comedy Series – Ray Romano (nominated)
- Outstanding Performance by a Female Actor in a Comedy Series – Patricia Heaton (nominated)

=== 2003 ===
- Outstanding Performance by an Ensemble in a Comedy Series (won)
- Outstanding Performance by a Male Actor in a Comedy Series – Ray Romano (nominated)
- Outstanding Performance by a Female Actor in a Comedy Series – Patricia Heaton (nominated)

=== 2004 ===
- Outstanding Performance by an Ensemble in a Comedy Series (nominated)
- Outstanding Performance by a Male Actor in a Comedy Series – Peter Boyle (nominated)
- Outstanding Performance by a Male Actor in a Comedy Series – Brad Garrett (nominated)
- Outstanding Performance by a Male Actor in a Comedy Series – Ray Romano (nominated)
- Outstanding Performance by a Female Actor in a Comedy Series – Doris Roberts (nominated)
- Outstanding Performance by a Female Actor in a Comedy Series – Patricia Heaton (nominated)

=== 2005 ===
- Outstanding Performance by an Ensemble in a Comedy Series (nominated)
- Outstanding Performance by a Male Actor in a Comedy Series – Ray Romano (nominated)
- Outstanding Performance by a Female Actor in a Comedy Series – Doris Roberts (nominated)
- Outstanding Performance by a Female Actor in a Comedy Series – Patricia Heaton (nominated)

=== 2006 ===
- Outstanding Performance by an Ensemble in a Comedy Series (nominated)
- Outstanding Performance by a Female Actor in a Comedy Series – Patricia Heaton (nominated)
