= Steve Skrovan =

American producer, writer, and director

Steve Skrovan is an American producer, writer, director and television host.

== Early life ==
Skrovan grew up in Cleveland, Ohio, and went to Gilmour Academy during his high-school years. He majored in English and was a varsity football defensive back at Yale, where he graduated with a B.A. in 1979.

== Career ==
Skrovan began his career as a stand-up comic. He hosted a short-lived talk show on MTV, Mouth to Mouth, in 1988. In 1989, he became the original host of Totally Hidden Video, which aired on FOX from 1989 to 1992. Starting in 1991, he was the host for the first two seasons of the game show That's My Dog on what was then The Family Channel.

Skrovan co-wrote the 1993 Seinfeld episode "The Movie". He was then a writer for the CBS sitcom Everybody Loves Raymond, for the entire nine-year run (from 1996 to 2005). In 2001 he played a police officer in Season 2, Episode 1 of Curb Your Enthusiasm.

Skrovan produced the 2005 TV special Earth to America, which covered environmental issues. He wrote, produced, and directed An Unreasonable Man, a 2006 documentary about Ralph Nader. He then worked as a producer on the 2006-2010 show 'Til Death, which starred former Raymond cast member Brad Garrett. Since 2014, Skrovan has co-hosted, with David Feldman, the weekly Ralph Nader Radio Hour program from the Pacifica Radio Network.

== Everybody Loves Raymond episodes ==
This is a list of Everybody Loves Raymond episodes written or co-written by Skrovan.

=== Season One ===
- "Standard Deviation"
- "Captain Nemo" (with Lew Schneider)
- "Recovering Pessimist"

=== Season Two ===
- "The Children's Book"
- "All I Want for Christmas"
- "The Family Bed"
- "Six Feet Under" (with Cindy Chupack & Tom Caltabiano)

=== Season Three ===
- "Getting Even"
- "Halloween Candy"
- "Cruising with Marie" (with Susan Van Allen)
- "Dancing with Debra" (with Aaron Shure)

=== Season Four ===
- "You Bet" (with Ellen Sandler)
- "Prodigal Son"
- "Hackidu" (with Lew Schneider)
- "Robert's Divorce" (with Jennifer Crittenden & Tucker Cawley)

=== Season Five ===
- "Pet Cemetery"
- "The Sneeze" (with Aaron Shure)

=== Season Six ===
- "Odd Man Out" (with Jeremy Stevens)
- "Raybert"
- "Cookies"
- "A Vote for Debra" (with Lew Schneider)

=== Season Seven ===
- "The Sigh"
- "Somebody Hates Raymond"
- "Just a Formality" (with Philip Rosenthal)

=== Season Eight ===
- "Home From School"
- "Lateness"
- "The Nice Talk" (with Aaron Shure)

=== Season Nine ===
- "Ally's F"
- "Tasteless Frank" (with Leslie Caveny)
- "The Finale" (with Philip Rosenthal, Ray Romano, Tucker Cawley, Lew Schneider, Jeremy Stevens, Mike Royce, Aaron Shure, Tom Caltabiano & Leslie Caveny)
