= The Finale (Everybody Loves Raymond) =

- Everybody Loves Raymond episode
- The final shot of "The Finale," where all of the Barones eat breakfast at Raymond's kitchen table
- Episode no.: Season 9 Episode 16
- Directed by: Gary Halvorson
- Written by: Philip Rosenthal; Ray Romano; Tom Caltabiano; Leslie Caveny; Tucker Cawley; Mike Royce; Lew Schneider; Aaron Shure; Steve Skrovan; Jeremy Stevens
- Production code: 0416
- Original air date: May 16, 2005

Episode chronology
← Previous "Pat's Secret"	Next → —

"The Finale" is the series finale of the American television sitcom Everybody Loves Raymond. The sixteenth episode of the ninth season, and the 210th episode of the series overall; it originally aired on CBS on May 16, 2005, and was preceded by an hour-long special looking back on the whole series.

== Synopsis ==
Ray tells Debra that the doctor told him his adenoids have to come out. Debra tells him that it's a routine procedure and Ray is appalled at Debra's lack of concern for his well-being. Ray gives Debra a hard time over the course of the next week, fretting about his upcoming surgery. On the day of the operation, Ray goes into surgery as the family waits in the waiting room. A few moments after Marie leaves to go to the bathroom, a nurse enters the waiting room and tells Debra that they are having trouble bringing Ray out of the anesthesia, causing everyone (minus Marie) to panic. Just before Robert walks through the door, the doctor emerges and says that Ray is awake and that it occasionally happens due to hypertension. Everyone is relieved and agrees that they can't tell Ray or Marie about what happened.

Later that evening, Debra brings Ray ice cream in bed. She watches as he starts eating and looks at him lovingly, telling him about what she is planning to do the next day, breaking down when she starts talking about the kids. Ray asks her if it is "that time of the month." Debra begins passionately kissing Ray.

Meanwhile, over at Marie's and Frank's, Frank is still reflecting on what happened. Marie notices something is up because he's too silent and he turned down dessert. She finally coerces Frank to tell her what happened at the hospital and is hysterical when she finds out that "her son almost died" and nobody told her. Back across the street, Ray and Debra are still in bed kissing when Marie rushes in, clumsily jumps over Debra and then smothers Ray with affection, causing an annoyed Debra to remark, "I knew one day this would happen", while Ray is mortified that his "worst nightmare is coming true" before jumping out of the bed and demanding to know what is going on.

Amy, Robert, and Frank come into the bedroom and Frank tells Ray about what happened at the hospital. Initially, Ray is furious that nobody told him, but then becomes curious as to how everyone reacted when they thought he might be dead. There is a pause and Ray irritably envisions what he thinks must have been going through Debra's head, saying that while she has to plan a funeral and raise three kids herself, she can finally start dating again. The scene takes on a moment of seriousness when Frank shouts that he saw Debra fall apart in the waiting room, telling Ray, "I've never seen her like that, and I'll tell you, I never want to see her like that again!"

Amy says that Robert had to pull the car over on the way home from the hospital because he was crying after "You Are the Sunshine of My Life" came on the radio- though Robert claims he pulled over because he thought he hit a cat. Everyone leaves and Debra and Ray are alone again, and the two reiterate that they really do love each other.

The final scene shows the entire family eating breakfast together in Ray's kitchen. Marie arrives after Frank breaks Marie's stove in an attempt to "work on it". All the other characters, seeming to emote an amalgam of their signature qualities. all arrive in the kitchen to sit and eat together, and with Ray at the center of the table, Debra tells Ray, "It's getting a little crowded in here," to which Ray responds, "Yeah, you know what? We need a bigger table." The camera angle slowly widens at the end before the picture fades, while we can still hear dialogue after the screen goes to black.

== Production ==
"The Finale" was directed by Gary Halvorson and written by Philip Rosenthal, Ray Romano, Tom Caltabiano, Leslie Caveny, Tucker Cawley, Mike Royce, Lew Schneider, Aaron Shure, Steve Skrovan, and Jeremy Stevens. The episode's table read was done on January 18, 2005, and was the only time a "rehearsal" was ever done for the series. During the read, Patricia Heaton began to cry. Filming of the episode began on January 20, 2005; it was delayed twice because Heaton contracted laryngitis. Following the filming of the episode, Romano claims he was "very worried" about how he would feel; he said that, on the day of filming, "you sensed the ending of it all."

== Broadcast and reception ==
On the night of its airing, "The Finale" aired after Everybody Loves Raymond: The Last Laugh, an hour-long behind-the-scenes documentary of making the episode; and an episode of Late Show with David Letterman that re-showed Romano's 1995 skit on the show that caused Everybody Loves Raymond to be green-lit. The top price for a 30-second commercial during the U.S. broadcast was approximately $1 million. The episode brought in the largest audience in the show's nine-year run: 32.94 million viewers, a 20.2 rating and a 29 share, along with an 11.2 rating and a 26 share in the 18-49 demographic, ranking as the most watched program of the week.

Miriam Di Nunzio of Chicago Sun-Times, awarding "The Finale" three-and-a-half stars, wrote the premise of all the family members loving each other made the episode "emotional and unforgettable." Jeffrey Robinson called it "a great episode with a solid combination of heartwarming material and comedy," also stating no other Raymond episode had the same level of sentimentality.
