= Wish You Were Here (American TV series) =

- Created by: Steven Bawol
- Starring: Lew Schneider; Sándor Szabó; Anna Feher; Vince Metcalfe; Jayne Eastwood; Tom Riis Farrell
- Music by: Bob Telson
- Country of origin: United States
- Original language: English
- No. of seasons: 1
- No. of episodes: 6

Production
- Executive producers: Carole Hart; Marlo Thomas; Katie Berlin
- Running time: 30 minutes
- Production companies: Hart, Thomas & Berlin; Those Guys International; Viacom Productions

Original release
- Network: CBS
- Release: July 20 – August 24, 1990

Wish You Were Here is an American sitcom that was premiered on July 20, 1990, as a summer replacement on CBS in the 9:30pm slot, which lasted for only six episodes. Its premise was that a stockbroker, Donny Cogswell, portrayed by Lew Schneider, quits his job and sends video cassette postcards of his European adventures to family and friends back in the United States.

== Cast ==
- Lew Schneider as Donny Cogswell
- Sándor Szabó as Grandpa Ziggy
- Anna Feher as Anna
- Vince Metcalfe as Stan
- Tom Riis Farrell as Gary
- Jayne Eastwood as Stella

== Plot ==
Donny Cogswell, a stockbroker on Wall Street in New York acquires a new video camera. He begins recording with it much to the chagrin of his boss who notes Donny's attitude problem. Donny decides to quit his job before being fired (all the while recording his conversation with his boss) and to travel the world with his camcorder, mailing videotapes of his adventures and interviews he conducts with local people back to his family, friends and girlfriend in the USA near Cleveland. Sometimes his destinations are chosen by other characters met along the way.

== Episodes ==
No.	Title	Directed by	Written by	Original release date
1	"Paris"	George Mihalka	Peter Tolan	July 20, 1990
2	"Budapest"	George Mihalka	Story by : Steven Bawol; Teleplay by : Steven Bawol & Sean Kelly	July 27, 1990
3	"Barcelona"	Steven Bawol	Story by : Peter Tolan & Larry Jacobson; Teleplay by : Sean Kelly	August 3, 1990
4	"Marrakech"	Naill Leonard	Story by : Peter Tolan; Teleplay by : Sean Kelly & Chris Kelly	August 10, 1990
5	"French Riviera"	George Mihalka	Ellis Weiner	August 17, 1990
6	"Balkans"	Unknown	Unknown	August 24, 1990

== Production ==
Some, if not all, of the footage from Donny's camera was shot on Hi-8mm videotape.

== Production crew ==
- Created by Steven Bawol
- Produced by Carole Hart, Robert Altman, Stephen Skip Lane, Steven Bawol
- Directed by George Mihalka, Nail Leonard, Steve Bawol, Bob Altman
- Written by Steven Bawol, Sean Kelly, Peter Tolan
- Director of photography, Robert Draper
- Executive story editor, Sean Kelly
- Music by Bob Telson
- Costumes by Candice Clements
- Line producer, Rémi Kessler
- Production designer, Mike Moran
- Executive producers - Carole Hart, Marlo Thomas & Katie Berlin Productions and Bob Altman, Steve Bawol and Stephen Skip Lane
- Developed by Those Guys International; Stephen Skip Lane, CEO
