= Boys' Therapy =

- Everybody Loves Raymond episode
- Episode no.: Season 9 Episode 6
- Directed by: Kenneth Shapiro
- Written by: Philip Rosenthal
- Cinematography by: Mike Berlin
- Editing by: Patricia Barnett
- Production code: 0406
- Original air date: November 15, 2004
- Running time: 22 minutes

Episode chronology
← Previous "Ally's F"	Next → "Debra's Parents"
- Everybody Loves Raymond (season 9)

"Boys' Therapy" is the sixth episode of the ninth season of the American sitcom Everybody Loves Raymond (1996–2005), and the 200th overall episode of the series. The episode aired on November 15, 2004 on CBS.

== Production ==
The two-hundredth episode of Everybody Loves Raymond, "Boys' Therapy" was written to expand on "something we hadn't yet known about the characters".

== Reception ==
Critics at Variety ranked "Boys' Therapy" the fourth-best episode of any comedy series of the 2004–05 TV season, praising its handling of serious subject matter; claimed one of the critics, Neal Justin, "that the sitcom could touch on Frank’s (Peter Boyle) childhood abuse without sacrificing laughs is proof that the writers and Boyle are tremendous tightrope walkers." Screen Rant ranked a line of the episode, "And I owe it all to Marie's Mouth," as the ninth best line in Everybody Loves Raymond spoken by Frank. DVDTalk, in a season nine review, highlight "Boys' Therapy" as one of its "fun episodes." Boyle was nominated for a Primetime Emmy Award for Outstanding Supporting Actor in a Comedy Series for acting in "Boys' Therapy" and "Tasteless Frank;" and Brentley Walton, Kathy Oldham, and John Bickelhaupt were nominated for Outstanding Multi-Camera Sound Mixing for a Series or Special for working on the episode. "Boys' Therapy" was one of Boyle's favorite episodes of Everybody Loves Raymond.
