= Pat's Secret =

- Everybody Loves Raymond episode
- Episode no.: Season 9 Episode 15
- Directed by: Andy Ackerman
- Written by: Tucker Cawley
- Cinematography by: Mike Berlin
- Editing by: Patricia Barnett
- Production code: 0413
- Original air date: May 9, 2005
- Running time: 22 minutes

Guest appearances
- Chris Elliott as Peter MacDougall; Fred Willard as Hank MacDougall; Georgia Engel as Pat MacDougall

Episode chronology
← Previous "The Power of No"	Next → "The Finale"
- Everybody Loves Raymond (season 9)

"Pat's Secret" is the 15th episode of the ninth season of the American sitcom Everybody Loves Raymond (1996–2005). The episode aired on May 9, 2005 on CBS.

== Reception ==
As of October 2019, "Pat's Secret" is the sixth highest-rated Raymond episode on IMDb with a rating of 8.6/10. Critics at Variety ranked it the second-best episode of any comedy series of the 2004–05 TV season. Summarized Screen Rant, "The stakes continually build throughout the episode and the subtle absurdity of it all makes this one comedy gold. It's always great to see such a strong episode so late in a series."

=== Awards ===
Garrett won a Primetime Emmy Award for Outstanding Supporting Actor in a Comedy Series, which was for acting in "Pat's Secret" and "A Job for Robert." Both Willard and Engel were nominated for Primetime Emmy Awards for Outstanding Guest Actor in a Comedy Series and Outstanding Guest Actress in a Comedy Series respectively, which was for acting in "Pat's Secret," "A Date for Peter," and "Debra's Parents." Mike Berlin was also nominated for Outstanding Cinematography for a Multi-Camera Series for his work on "Pat's Secret."
