= Hank (2009 TV series) =

American sitcom

- Also known as: Awesome Hank; PRYORS
- Genre: Sitcom
- Created by: Tucker Cawley
- Starring: Kelsey Grammer; David Koechner; Melinda McGraw; Jordan Hinson; Nathan Gamble
- Composer: Matter Music
- Country of origin: United States
- Original language: English
- No. of seasons: 1
- No. of episodes: 10 (5 unaired in the U.S.)

Production
- Executive producers: Tucker Cawley; Kelsey Grammer; Mike Clements; Tom Werner
- Camera setup: Multi-camera
- Running time: 30 minutes
- Production companies: McMonkey Productions; Grammnet Productions; Werner Entertainment; Bonanza Productions; Warner Bros. Television

Original release
- Network: ABC
- Release: September 30 – November 4, 2009

Hank (originally titled Awesome Hank and PRYORS) is an American sitcom that originally aired on ABC from September 30, 2009 to November 4, 2009. The series was created by Tucker Cawley and is about a Wall Street executive who loses his job and reconnects with his small-town family. Hank originally aired on Wednesday nights in the fall season and starred Frasier actor Kelsey Grammer. It was produced by McMonkey Productions and Werner Entertainment, in association with Warner Bros. Television.

== Cast ==
- Kelsey Grammer as Hank Pryor – a Wall Street CEO who loses his job
- Melinda McGraw as Tilly Pryor – Hank's wife of 19 years
- Jordan Hinson as Maddie Pryor – Hank and Tilly's 15-year-old daughter
- Nathan Gamble as Henry Pryor – Hank and Tilly's son
- David Koechner as Grady Funk – Tilly's hillbilly brother

== Episodes ==
A total of 10 episodes of Hank were filmed and five have been aired, but on November 11, 2009, ABC said it had "no immediate plans" to air the others.

No.	Title	Directed by	Written by	Original release date	Prod. code	US viewers (millions)
1	"Pilot"	Andrew D. Weyman	Tucker Cawley	September 30, 2009	2J5341	8.336
A legendary entrepreneur in the sports retail world, Hank Pryor, and his wife, Tilly, have been living the high life in New York City. That is until Hank is forced out of his CEO job and has to downsize and move his family back home to the small town of River Bend, Virginia.
2	"Yard Sale"	Kelsey Grammer	Bill Martin & Mike Schiff	October 7, 2009	2J5302	6.446
Hank gets back into business by testing his entrepreneurial skills with a neighborhood yard sale.
3	"Drag Your Daughter to Work Day"	Andrew D. Weyman	Tucker Cawley	October 14, 2009	2J5301	6.153
When Hank tells Maddie that she needs to get a job like he used to have at her age, he ends up having to prove what he said was true by taking a job alongside her at the mall.
4	"Relax, Don't Do It"	Andrew D. Weyman	Jackie Filgo & Jeff Filgo	October 21, 2009	2J5303	5.775
Hank finds it challenging to "do nothing" while unemployed and is the ultimate over-achiever in his roles as a house-husband as well as a hunter
5	"Hanksgiving"	Andrew D. Weyman	Jackie Filgo & Jeff Filgo	November 4, 2009	2J5308	5.093
Hank's worst holiday nightmare comes true when his mother-in-law comes to visit for the first annual suburban Pryor Family "Hanksgiving".
6	"Got It"	Kelsey Grammer	Ilana Wernick	January 15, 2013 (SBT)	2J5304	N/A
Hank has had it with Tilly's annoying habit of saying "got it, got it, got it," but is afraid to discuss the issue directly with her, so he recruits his ever-so-subtle brother-in-law, Grady, to approach her about the problem.
7	"Hank's Got a Friend"	Andrew D. Weyman	DJ Nash	January 22, 2013 (SBT)	2J5305	N/A
Hank gets more than he bargained for when he finds a friend in suburbia.
8	"The Pryor Name"	Andrew D. Weyman	Steve Skrovan	February 2, 2013 (SBT)	2J5306	N/A
Hank gears up for his first big meeting since his career 'downsized'.
9	"Tree House"	Andrew D. Weyman	Tucker Cawley & DJ Nash	January 29, 2013 (SBT)	2J5307	N/A
Henry helps with a tree house, while Maddie is skipping her chores.
10	"Dog"	Gail Mancuso	Bill Martin & Mike Schiff	February 19, 2013 (SBT)	2J5309	N/A
When Henry chooses a grizzled old hound for a pet, Hank realizes he has a lot in common with the doddery old dog.

== U.S. ratings ==
Episode Number	Episode	Rating	Share	Rating/Share (18–49)	Viewers (millions)	Rank (Timeslot)	Rank (Night)
1	"Pilot"	5.4	9	2.2/7	8.46	4	10
2	"Yard Sale"	4.4	7	1.6/5	6.72	6	14
3	"Drag Your Daughter to Work Day"	4.2	7	1.6/5	6.24	6	14
4	"Relax, Don't Do It"	3.9	7	1.5/5	5.84	6	13
5	"Hanksgiving"	3.6	6	1.4/4	5.33	7	13
6	"Got It"	TBA	TBA	TBA	TBA	TBA	TBA
7	"Hank's Got a Friend"	TBA	TBA	TBA	TBA	TBA	TBA
8	"The Pryor Name"	TBA	TBA	TBA	TBA	TBA	TBA
9	"Tree House"	TBA	TBA	TBA	TBA	TBA	TBA
10	"Dog"	TBA	TBA	TBA	TBA	TBA	TBA

== Reception ==
The show received negative reviews from critics, scoring a 36/100 in Metacritic, with viewers agreeing with the critics, scoring it at a 4.1/10. The Los Angeles Times has noted "There's nothing here you couldn't imagine from the premise, but there's also nothing wrong with what's here: McGraw is a good foil for Grammer, and Grammer is good at what he does." The New York Post panned the show: "Hank is one of the worst new (or old) comedies of this or many other seasons".

== Cancellation ==
Hank was officially cancelled on November 11, 2009 amidst low ratings and bad reviews. A total of ten episodes of the series have been produced, leaving five episodes unaired. ABC stated that they had no immediate plans to air the remaining episodes. Special programs and reruns of comedy shows aired in its place. In a December 2009 interview with Jay Leno, Kelsey Grammer admitted that he had initially called Warner Bros. to ask that the show be cancelled because it was too unfunny. The unaired episodes have since aired in the UK on BT Vision and in Croatia on Doma TV.
