= Sawyer Sweeten =

American child actor (1995–2015)

- Born: Sawyer Storm Sweeten; May 12, 1995; Brownwood, Texas, U.S.
- Died: April 23, 2015 (aged 19); Austin, Texas, U.S.
- Occupation: Actor
- Years active: 1996–2005
- Relatives: Madylin Sweeten (sister), Sullivan Sweeten (twin brother)

Sawyer Storm Sweeten (May 12, 1995 – April 23, 2015) was an American child actor. He was best known for his role as Geoffrey Barone on the sitcom Everybody Loves Raymond.

== Life and career ==
Sweeten was born in Brownwood, Texas, to parents Timothy Sweeten and Elizabeth Millsap. He had two sisters, Madylin and Maysa, and an identical twin brother, Sullivan. Sawyer rose to prominence when he, Sullivan, and Madylin had recurring roles on the CBS sitcom Everybody Loves Raymond for nine seasons.

The Sweeten family moved to California when the twins were six months old; the siblings were cast less than a year later. Later, Sawyer and Sullivan owned a house together in Riverside, California.

== Death and tributes ==
On April 23, 2015, Sweeten died from a self-inflicted gunshot wound to the head at the age of 19. His death prompted public tributes by his Everybody Loves Raymond co-stars.

His on-screen father Ray Romano was shocked by the news and said he was a "wonderful and sweet kid to be around." Sweeten's on-screen mother Patricia Heaton said that he was "a funny and exceptionally bright young man. He is gone from us far too soon."

Brad Garrett, who portrayed Sweeten's on-screen uncle, released a statement: "The Sweeten family was our family for those nine years on Raymond. My deepest condolences and love go out to them during this unimaginable time." Phil Rosenthal, creator of Everybody Loves Raymond and husband of co-star Monica Horan, remembered Sawyer, his twin brother Sullivan, and their older sister Madylin as "children that never failed to make us laugh, or remind us of how we feel about our own children."

His on-screen/real-life sister Madylin released a statement regarding her brother's death and pleaded for everyone "to reach out to the ones you love."

== Filmography ==
=== Film ===
Year	Title	Role	Notes
2002	Frank McKlusky, C.I.	Young Frank McKlusky	

=== Television ===
Year	Title	Role	Notes
1996–2005	Everybody Loves Raymond	Geoffrey Barone	Recurring cast
2000	Even Stevens	Milton	Episode: "All About Yvette"
