= Men of a Certain Age =

American comedy-drama television series (2009–2011)

- Genre: Comedy drama
- Created by: Ray Romano; Mike Royce
- Starring: Ray Romano; Scott Bakula; Andre Braugher; LisaGay Hamilton; Richard Gant; Brian J. White; Lil' JJ; Kwesi Boakye; Brittany Curran; Braeden Lemasters; Isaiah Montgomery; Melinda McGraw
- Opening theme: "When I Grow Up (To Be a Man)" by The Beach Boys
- Country of origin: United States
- Original language: English
- No. of seasons: 2
- No. of episodes: 22

Production
- Executive producers: Cary Hoffman; Ray Romano; Rory Rosegarten; Mike Royce; Scott Winant; Marshall Boone
- Editor: Kevin D. Ross
- Running time: 43 minutes
- Production companies: Snowpants Productions; Papa Al Productions; TNT Original Productions

Original release
- Network: TNT
- Release: December 7, 2009 – July 6, 2011

Men of a Certain Age is an American comedy-drama television series created by Ray Romano and Mike Royce, that ran on TNT from December 7, 2009, to July 6, 2011. The hour-long program stars Romano, Andre Braugher, and Scott Bakula as three best friends in their late forties dealing with the realities of being middle aged. The show won a Peabody Award, and Braugher was twice nominated for the Primetime Emmy Award for Outstanding Supporting Actor in a Drama Series.

On July 15, 2011, TNT cancelled the series after two seasons spanning 22 episodes.

== Plot ==
The series follows the adventures of Joe, Owen, and Terry, three men in their late 40s who have been friends since college. Joe (Ray Romano) is a timid, separated (later divorced) father of two (Brittany Curran as Lucy, and Braeden Lemasters as Albert) who had dreamed of becoming a pro golfer but now owns a party supply store, and has a gambling addiction. Owen (Andre Braugher) is an anxiety-stricken, diabetic husband and father, who works at a job he hates, selling cars at a dealership owned and managed by his authoritative father, former NBA player Owen Thoreau, Sr. (Richard Gant). Terry (Scott Bakula) is an apartment building manager and semi-retired actor desperate to relive his past glory. He has never married, and usually dates much younger women.

In the second season, Owen's father has retired and left Owen in charge of the dealership, where Owen hires Terry as a salesman. Joe, now officially divorced, turns 50 and attempts to qualify for the PGA Senior Tour.

== Cast and characters ==
=== Main cast ===
- Ray Romano as Joe Tranelli, an aspiring golfer who never reached the professional level. Joe now owns a party store. He is separated from his wife and has two children.
- Scott Bakula as Terry Elliot, an apartment building manager and former actor struggling to relive his glory days. He has never married.
- Andre Braugher as Owen Thoreau, Jr., an anxiety-suffering, diabetic car salesman working for his father. He is married and has three children.
- LisaGay Hamilton as Melissa Thoreau, Owen's wife.
- Richard Gant as Owen Thoreau, Sr, Owen's father, the owner of a Chevrolet car dealership and former NBA player.
- Brian J. White as Marcus, a car salesman who works with Owen.
- Lil' JJ as Dashaun (season 1, recurring season 2), a party store employee
- Kwesi Boakye as Jamie Thoreau
- Brittany Curran as Lucy Tranelli
- Braeden Lemasters as Albert Tranelli
- Isaiah Montgomery as Michael Thoreau
- Melinda McGraw as Erin Riley (season 2)

=== Recurring cast ===
- Emily Rios as Maria
- Eddie Shin as Carl
- Carla Gallo as Annie
- Matt Price as Lawrence
- Michael Hitchcock as Dave
- Albert Hall as Bruce
- Patricia de Leon as Joe's Fantasy Woman
- Jon Manfrellotti as Manfro, Joe's bookmaker
- Penelope Ann Miller as Joe's ex-wife, Sonia Tranelli
- Robert Loggia as Joe's father, Artie

== Development ==
In March 2008, TNT announced that it had ordered a pilot based on a script written by Ray Romano and Mike Royce. Both men had previously worked together on Everybody Loves Raymond. Andre Braugher and Scott Bakula were announced in June and July, respectively, to also star in the series with Romano. In January 2009, TNT ordered 10 episodes of Men of a Certain Age. It is Bakula's first series as a regular cast member since Star Trek: Enterprise, Braugher's first regular role since Thief ended in 2006, and Romano's first series since Everybody Loves Raymond wrapped in May 2005. Men of a Certain Age premiered on TNT on December 7, 2009. It was given a TV-MA-L rating because of strong language. On January 14, 2010 TNT renewed the show for a second season, which premiered on December 6, 2010. The second season was aired in two batches of six episodes each.

On July 15, 2011, TNT announced that they would not be renewing Men of a Certain Age for a third season.

== Episodes ==
=== Series overview ===
| Season | Episodes | Originally released | |
| Season | Episodes | First released | Last released |
|---|---|---|---|
| 1 | 10 | December 7, 2009 | February 23, 2010 |
| 2 | 12 | December 6, 2010 | July 6, 2011 |

=== Season 1 (2009–10) ===
| No. overall | No. in season | Title | Directed by | Written by | Original release date | U.S. viewers (millions) |
|---|---|---|---|---|---|---|
| 1 | 1 | "Pilot" | Scott Winant | Ray Romano & Mike Royce | December 7, 2009 | 5.4 |
In the series premiere, we are introduced to Joe, Owen and Terry, who have been friends for years. Joe, who once had a dream of becoming a professional golfer, is now a party-store owner who is dealing with his recent separation from his wife. Owen is a married father of three working for his father as a car salesman in order to make ends meet and Terry is a former actor who is trying to recapture his past glory. The three of them support each other through their mid-life challenges during daily lunch meetings at a local diner and hikes in the hills of Los Angeles. Owen collapses due to low blood sugar during a hike and is hospitalized. Afterwards, he has a falling out with his father over his sales figures, while Joe meets a bookmaker named Manfro and Terry auditions for a role but finds the odds are against him.
| 2 | 2 | "Let It Go" | Scott Winant | Ray Romano & Mike Royce | December 14, 2009 | 4.4 |
Joe, who has been living in a hotel room since separating from his wife, begins to think about renting an apartment. Owen uses an old dealership model as his new car, much to his wife's dismay and Terry sets out to find the rude driver who almost ran him down.
| 3 | 3 | "Mind's Eye" | Phil Traill | Rick Muirragui | December 21, 2009 | 3.7 |
Joe makes an attempt to bond with his son by teaching him the basics of golf, and winds up hearing about his son's personal issues. Meanwhile, Terry and an actress friend team up to pose as a married couple at an open-house, but Terry takes his role too seriously and Owen attempts to get his sales figures up but is stifled by a moral dilemma.
| 4 | 4 | "The New Guy" | Ed Bianchi | Bridget Bedard | December 28, 2009 | 3.1 |
Terry and Owen intend to go to the local school fund-raiser auction, as they do every year, but discover that for the first time, Joe is not planning on going; this is because his ex-wife Sonia will be there with her new boyfriend Harold. Instead, Joe plans to stay home. However, he soon finds himself bored out of his mind, and ends up spending a wild night out with his bookie, Manfro. Meanwhile, at the auction, Melissa and Owen find themselves seated at the same table as Sonia and Harold, who accidentally let slip that they had started dating nearly a full year before Joe and Sonia had split up. Owen is furious and is unable to "make nice" as Melissa wants, and is shocked by Terry's laid-back attitude about the news that Sonia had been cheating on their friend. Terry, who is there as auctioneer, finds himself a hit with the ladies, but is at first unable to fully work his charms, thanks to unintended interference by a friendly but boorish coworker. Terry eventually manages to arrange a rendezvous with a former lover, despite the fact that she is engaged. However, thoughts about the implications of Sonia cheating on Joe cause Terry to change his mind at the last minute, and he decides to skip the rendezvous. The next morning, Owen visits Joe at his motel and tells him about Sonia's cheating on him. Joe takes it in stride, confessing that he too was confiding in an old friend while married to Sonia and Sonia found out about it, and that they were heading towards a separation anyway. Owen returns home and hugs Melissa.
| 5 | 5 | "Powerless" | David Paymer | Mark Stegemann | January 4, 2010 | 3.1 |
Owen and his family must stay at his demanding father's house when their own home loses power. Adding to the headache: Construction on Owen's house halts because of a crooked contractor. Meanwhile, Joe suspects that his daughter is being stalked by her ex-flame.
| 6 | 6 | "Go with the Flow" | Millicent Shelton | Jack Orman | January 11, 2010 | 2.9 |
Joe recounts the tale of the first date he has gone on in 20 years with Dory (Sarah Clarke). The misadventures include a black eye, a potentially embarrassing encounter with one of his employees, an unfortunate piece of advice from Terry, an anxious Little Leaguer and a poorly placed lamp.
| 7 | 7 | "Father's Fraternity" | Ed Bianchi | Warren Hutcherson | January 25, 2010 | 2.3 |
Daddy issues plague both Joe and Owen, as Joe pays a visit to his curmudgeonly retired father (Robert Loggia) and Owen's dad produces an auto-dealership commercial that suggests Owen is not his son—but Owen's coworker is. Meanwhile, Terry is applying to volunteer as a Big Brother.
| 8 | 8 | "You Gonna Do That the Rest of Your Life?" | David Boyd | Lew Schneider | February 1, 2010 | 2.3 |
Joe's bookie finds out that Joe is an excellent golfer and exploits his skills in a scam. Meanwhile, Owen's weight gain is worrying his family and Terry moves into a new apartment building and becomes the apartment manager.
| 9 | 9 | "How to Be an All-Star" | Phil Traill | Bridget Bedard | February 15, 2010 | 2.1 |
When his son's anxiety level rises because of the poor family situation, Joe decides that it is time to buy a house. In order to get some of the money, he places a $25,000 bet on a basketball game. Meanwhile at the dealership, Owen must deal with an irritable, disrespectful customer and Terry reunites with a former friend who has gone on to become a famous actor.
| 10 | 10 | "Back in the S#!t" | David Boyd | Story by : Lew Schneider & Mark Stegemann; Teleplay by : Ray Romano & Mike Royce | February 23, 2010 | 2.6 |
Feeling guilty about his rapid downward spiral, which includes out of control gambling and having to cut back on staff at his store, Joe decides to stop gambling. Owen finds a new sense of purpose when he goes to work for a rival auto dealership following his father's decision to turn management over to Marcus. And Terry's life spins out of control when his gig on a movie results in disasters at the apartment complex he manages.

=== Season 2 (2010–11) ===
| No. overall | No. in season | Title | Directed by | Written by | Original release date | U.S. viewers (millions) |
|---|---|---|---|---|---|---|
| 11 | 1 | "If I Could, I Surely Would" | Ed Bianchi | Ray Romano & Mike Royce | December 6, 2010 | 2.4 |
Joe is determined to get himself back in good shape on the golf course, but having to get up at the crack of dawn to practice is starting to wear on him. Plus, his new house just happens to be in the same neighborhood as his former bookie. Owen is now manager of his father's auto dealership, but his decision to hire Terry is starting to look like a bad move. It turns out Terry's acting skills are not helping him succeed in selling any cars. He is also not exactly cut out for a 9-to-5 job.
| 12 | 2 | "Same as the Old Boss" | Jennifer Getzinger | Mark Stegemann | December 13, 2010 | 2.2 |
Joe attempts to stick to a schedule that will allow him time to practice his golf game, but it is a fruitless endeavor. Owen tries to assert some authority over the car dealership's service department, but being the manager is starting to have a negative impact on his life, especially his marriage. Terry becomes the butt of his coworker's pranks when they discover a video of one of his old commercials online.
| 13 | 3 | "Cold Calls" | Ed Bianchi | Itamar Moses | December 20, 2010 | 2.3 |
Joe finds himself dating two women at the same time, but he is not quite sure how to handle the situation. Terry agrees to a bet with a fellow car salesman over who can unload the most cars by the end of the week. Owen pushes his father to stop undermining his authority at the dealership.
| 14 | 4 | "The Bad Guy" | Millicent Shelton | Siân Heder | December 27, 2010 | 2.3 |
In the midst of finalizing his divorce, Joe makes a surprising discovery about his teenage daughter. Owen goes to a car convention, where he gets some important and unexpected news from his father. And Terry is approached about a television commercial he did many years ago. Penelope Ann Miller guest-stars.
| 15 | 5 | "And Then the Bill Comes" | David Boyd | Bridget Bedard | January 3, 2011 | 2.1 |
Joe feels conflicted after finding out some news about his former bookie, Manfro (guest star Jon Manfrellotti). Terry begins to embrace the benefits of having a 9-to-5 job. Owen takes a huge step towards resolving the tension between sales and service.
| 16 | 6 | "Let the Sunshine In" | David Boyd | Tucker Cawley | January 10, 2011 | 3.3 |
When Terry announces he is going to get a colonoscopy for his 50th birthday, the guys all decide to get one, making a weekend out of it in Palm Springs. While there, Joe deals with his "mind" bets, Terry cannot stop thinking about Erin and Owen opens up about his dad and the dealership.
| 17 | 7 | "The Great Escape" | Millicent Shelton | Lew Schneider | June 1, 2011 | 1.8 |
Joe decides to spend some time with his former bookie Manfro (guest star Jon Manfrellotti), who is preparing to undergo a difficult medical treatment. Terry and Erin take a bold new step in their relationship. And Owen receives an intriguing offer from a rival dealership. Penelope Ann Miller also guest-stars.
| 18 | 8 | "The Pickup" | Phil Traill | Ken Blankstein | June 8, 2011 | 1.3 |
Joe does a favor for Manfro (guest star Jon Manfrellotti) that could have a lasting effect. Terry struggles to deal with the latest development in his love life. And Owen tries to keep things on the lot from getting out of control as a feud develops between his top salesmen. Penelope Ann Miller also guest stars.
| 19 | 9 | "A League of Their Owen" | David Boyd | Tucker Cawley & Itamar Moses | June 15, 2011 | 1.4 |
Owen is handed the reins to the Thoreau Chevrolet softball team right before the season opener against a rival dealership. Joe's dad (guest star Robert Loggia) comes to visit and brings along his new girlfriend to meet the family. And Terry's relationship troubles come to a head. Patrick Gallagher and Alanna Ubach also guest-star.
| 20 | 10 | "Can't Let That Slide" | Mike Royce | Siân Heder & Lew Schneider | June 22, 2011 | 1.5 |
Joe's friendship with Manfro becomes more complicated. (Guest star Jon Manfrellotti). Owen observes the sales guys in action after installing hidden cameras at the dealership. And Terry's date night goes awry. Alanna Ubach also guest-stars.
| 21 | 11 | "Whatever Gets You Through the Night" | Geoff Haley | Bridget Bedard & Mike Royce | June 29, 2011 | 1.5 |
Owen and Terry team up on a new commercial for the dealership. Joe tries to get his store and his life back on track but old relationships complicate matters. Jon Manfrellotti and Sarah Clarke guest-star.
| 22 | 12 | "Hold Your Finish" | David Boyd | Bridget Bedard & Mark Stegemann | July 6, 2011 | 1.7 |
Joe's big day – the senior tour pre-qualifier – has finally arrived. Terry realizes a new dream and passion. And Owen discusses the future of the auto dealership with his father.

== Critical reception ==
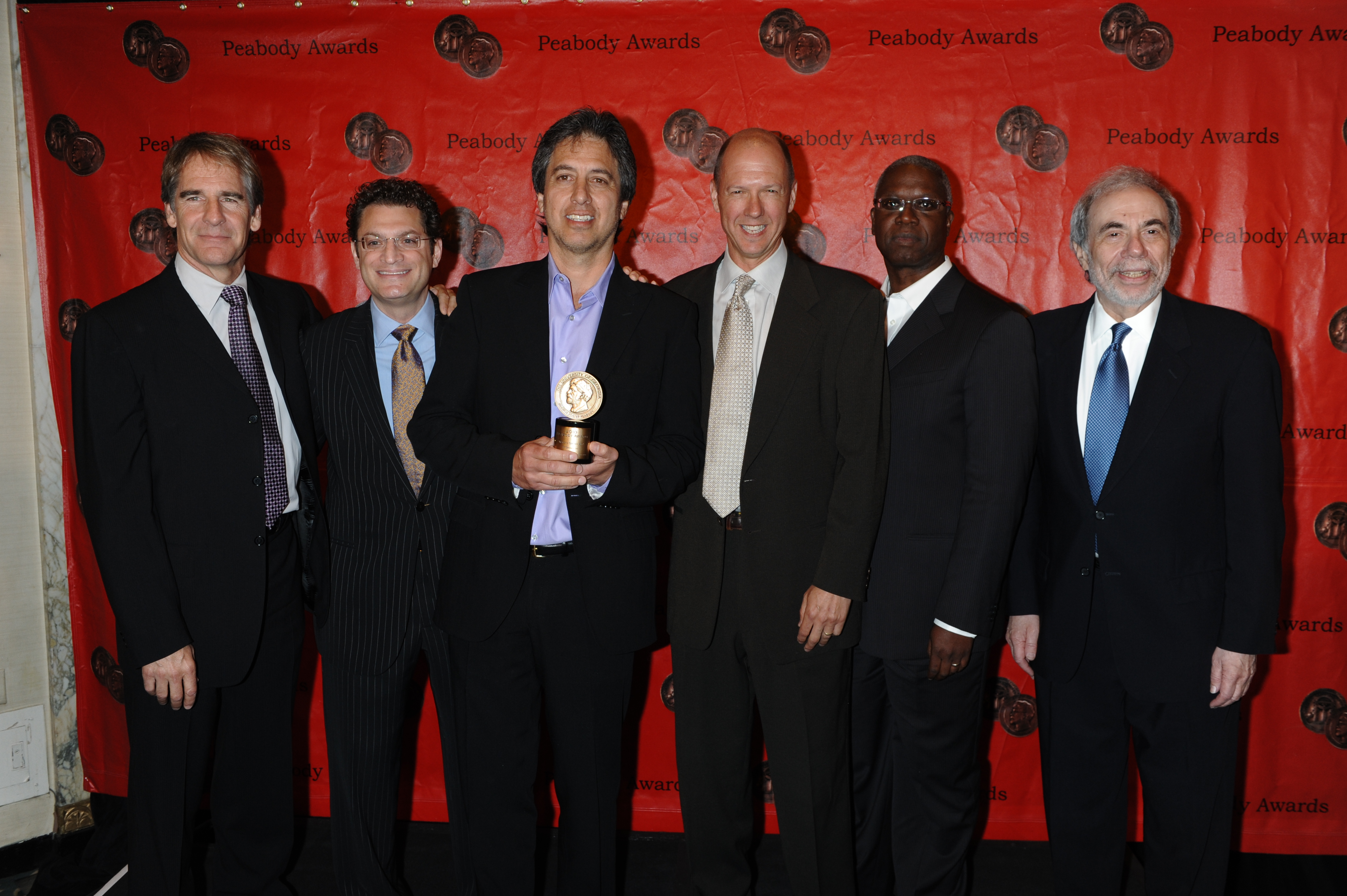
Scott Bakula, Rory Rosegarten, Ray Romano, Mike Royce, Andre Braugher, and Cary Hoffman of Men of a Certain Age at the 70th Annual Peabody Awards

Season one was met with positive reviews. According to aggregate review site Rotten Tomatoes, it holds an 89% approval rating based on 18 reviews. The site's consensus reads: "Witty, insightful, and poignant, Men of a Certain Age is a second-act triumph for stars Scott Bakula, Andre Braugher, and Ray Romano." It holds a Metacritic score of 78 out of 100, based on 24 collected reviews, indicating "generally favorable reviews".

Season two was met with equally positive reviews. It holds a 100% approval rating on Rotten Tomatoes based on 14 reviews. The sites consensus reads: "Sharply written and deftly acted, Men of a Certain Age continues to be an observational sitcom of rare insight and depth." It holds a Metacritic score of 86 out of 100, based on 15 collected reviews, indicating "universal acclaim".

== Home media ==
| Name | Region 1 | Region 2 | Region 4 | Discs |
|---|---|---|---|---|
| Men of a Certain Age: The Complete First Season | November 9, 2010 | —N/a | —N/a | 2 |
| Men of a Certain Age: The Complete Second and Final Season | December 4, 2012 | —N/a | —N/a | 3 |

== Awards and nominations ==
| Year | Association | Category / Recipient | Results | Ref |
|---|---|---|---|---|
| 2010 | Humanitas Prize Awards | 60 Minute Category (for episode "Father's Fraternity") (writer) Hutcherson | Nominated | |
| 2010 | Peabody Awards | Men of a Certain Age | Won | |
| 2010 | Primetime Emmy Awards | Outstanding Supporting Actor in a Drama Series (for episode "Powerless") / Andre Braugher | Nominated | |
| 2011 | Guild of Music Supervisors Awards | Best Music Supervisor for Television / Gary Calamar | Won | |
| 2011 | NAACP Image Awards | Outstanding Directing in a Drama Series / Millicent Shelton | Won | |
| 2011 | NAACP Image Awards | Outstanding Supporting Actor in a Drama Series / Andre Braugher | Nominated | |
| 2011 | Online Film & Television Association | Best Supporting Actor in a Drama Series / Andre Braugher | Nominated | |
| 2011 | Peabody Awards | Men of a Certain Age / TNT (production company) | Won | |
| 2011 | Peabody Awards | Braeden Lemasters | Won | |
| 2011 | Primetime Emmy Awards | Outstanding Supporting Actor in a Drama Series (for episode "Let the Sunshine In") / Andre Braugher | Nominated | |
| 2011 | Writers Guild of America | New Series / Men of a Certain Age (writer) Bridget Bedard (writer) Tucker Cawley (writer) Warren Hutcherson (writer) Rick Muirragui (writer) Jack Orman (writer) Ray Romano (writer) Mike Royce (writer) Lew Schneider (writer) Mark Stegemann | Nominated | |
| 2011 | Young Artists Awards | Best Performance in a TV Series (Comedy or Drama) — Supporting Young Actor / Braedon Lemasters | Nominated | |
| 2011 | Young Artists Awards | Best Performance in a TV Series (Comedy or Drama) — Supporting Young Actress / Brittany Curran | Nominated | |
| 2012 | Guild of Music Supervisors Awards | Best Music Supervision for Television / Gary Calamar | Won | |
| 2012 | NAACP Image Awards | Outstanding Actor in a Drama Series / Andre Braugher | Nominated | |
| 2012 | NAMIC Vision Awards | Best Performance — Drama / Andre Braugher | Won | |
| 2012 | NAMIC Vision Awards | Best Performance — Drama / LisaGay Hamilton | Nominated | |

== Broadcasting ==
=== International ===
In Canada, Men of a Certain Age can be seen on Super Channel. In Latin America, Men of a Certain Age premiered on July 13, 2010 on the prime time block of Warner Channel.

=== Streaming ===
Men of a Certain Age is available to stream for two seasons on WarnerMedia's HBO Max, which launched on May 27, 2020.
