= Robert's Date =

- Everybody Loves Raymond episode
- Episode no.: Season 3 Episode 15
- Directed by: Will Mackenzie
- Written by: Jeremy Stevens
- Cinematography by: Mike Berlin
- Editing by: Patricia Barnett
- Production code: 9815
- Original air date: February 1, 1999
- Running time: 22 minutes

Guest appearances
- Sherri Shepherd Sergeant Judy; Shelley Robertson as Sareesa

Episode chronology
← Previous "Pants on Fire"	Next → "Frank's Tribute"
- Everybody Loves Raymond (season 3)

"Robert's Date" is the 15th episode of the third season of the American sitcom Everybody Loves Raymond (1996–2005). The episode aired on February 1, 1999 on CBS.

== Reception ==
"Robert's Date" is one of Everybody Loves Raymond's most well-known episodes with viewers, ranking number five in a March 2005 online poll ran by CBS of top Raymond episodes; and is considered by some critics one of the best episodes of the entire series. Randy Cordova of The Arizona Republic highlighted "Robert's Date" as an "episode you must see," reasoning that it had "lots of laughs, but also a thoughtful look at Robert's insecurity." Garrett also admitted "Robert's Date" to be his favorite Raymond episode. Summarized Screen Rant, "this episode is rife with plenty of hilariously awkward moments featuring Robert at his comedic best, and some humorous back-and-forth between Ray and his brother as he tries to subtly pass along Judy's message to 'cool it' with the act." However, the publication also criticized the episode for its out-of-date use of stereotypes of African-Americans (particularly with Robert speaking Ebonics) and Italians.

== Awards ==
Will Mackenzie was nominated for a Primetime Emmy Award for Outstanding Directing for a Comedy Series for his work on "Robert's Date," while Patricia Bennett was nominated for an Eddie Award for Best Edited Half-Hour Series for Television for editing the episode.

== Home media ==
On May 3, 2005, all of the third season of Everybody Loves Raymond was released to DVD; the set not only features "Robert's Date," but also a blooper reel that includes outtakes of the episode.
