= Jon Manfrellotti =

American actor

Jon Manfrelotti
- Born: Jonathan Manfrelotti; 1953 (age 72–73); Little Italy, New York
- Occupation: Actor

Jon Manfrellotti (born 1953) is an American actor who has appeared in several sitcoms. He is best known for his role as Gianni in Everybody Loves Raymond.

== Career ==
Manfrellotti got his first role in Flodder in Amerika! in 1992. Since then, he has made several minor appearances in several mainstream shows. These include Law & Order, Seinfeld, Platypus Man, NYPD Blue and Mad Men. He has also appeared in several films including Grilled, Just My Luck, Welcome to Mooseport, Crime of the Century and Spy Hard.

His first major role was as Ray Barone's friend "Gianni" for 25 episodes on Everybody Loves Raymond. Before he got that steady role on Everybody Loves Raymond, he made his first appearance during the show's first season as the Cable Guy on the episode “The Game”.

Manfrellotti appeared in a recurring role on the comedy-drama Men of a Certain Age during its two-season run on TNT.

== Filmography ==
=== Film ===
Year	Title	Role	Notes
1992	Flodders in America	Limousinebestuurder	
1996	Spy Hard	Bouncer / Doorman	
2004	Welcome to Mooseport	Reporter	
2006	Just My Luck	Palace Cab Driver	
2006	Grilled	Chef	
2016	Dating Daisy	Nathan	
2019	Tell Me I Love You	Barry	
2022	Somewhere in Queens	Petey	

=== Television ===
Year	Title	Role	Notes
1992	Law & Order	Detective Morelli	Episode: "Self Defense"
1995	Seinfeld	Guy in Police Lineup	Episode: "The Beard"
1995	Platypus Man	Ben	Episode: "Without a Hitch"
1996	Crime of the Century	Reporter	Television film
1997–2005	Everybody Loves Raymond	Gianni / Cable Guy	24 episodes
2000, 2005	The King of Queens	Ed / Gianni	2 episodes
2005	NYPD Blue	Ed Corbelli	Episode: "Sergeant Sipowicz' Lonely Hearts Club Band"
2009	'Til Death	Tom	Episode: "No Complaints"
2010–2015	Mad Men	Art Garten	3 episodes
2009–2011	Men of a Certain Age	Manfro	13 episodes
2018	I'm Dying Up Here	Phil	2 episodes
2021	Made for Love	Jerry	Episode: "I Want a Lawyer"
2025	High Potential	Carson Wood	Episode: "Eleven Minutes"
