= Tom Caltabiano =

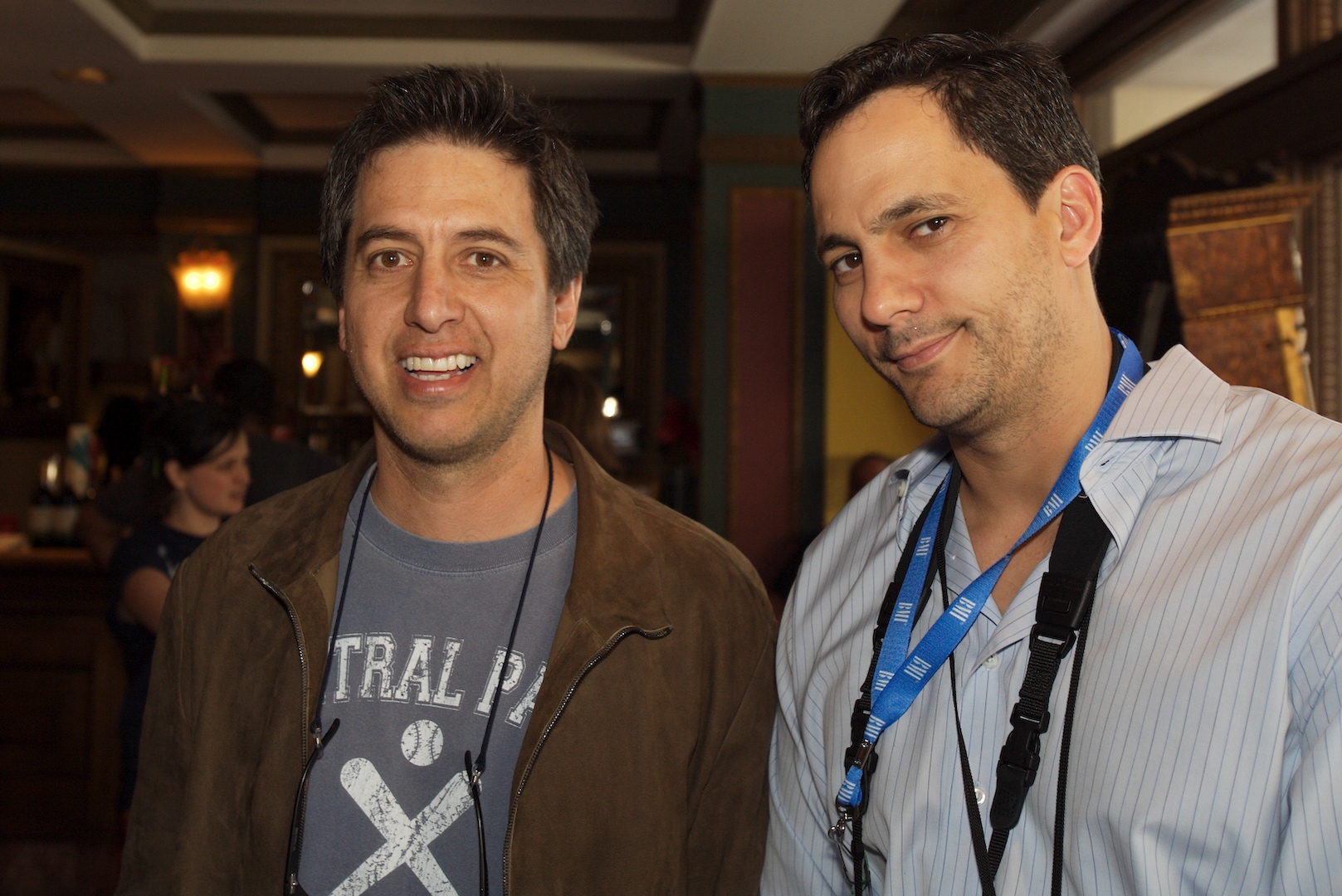
Tom Caltabiano (right) with Ray Romano in 2006

Tom Caltabiano is a writer and stand-up comedian. He directed and co-starred in the documentary 95 Miles to Go with longtime friend Ray Romano. He was a writer/producer on Everybody Loves Raymond and took over 30,000 behind-the-scenes photos of the show. Caltabiano was a guest host for CBS's The Late Late Show in 2004 when Craig Kilborn abruptly exited. He was the inspiration for Terry Elliott, the character Scott Bakula played on TNT's Men of a Certain Age.

Caltabiano, a former resident of Sparta, New Jersey, graduated in 1983 from County College of Morris and earned degrees in finance and management from New York University.
