= Monica Horan =

American actress (born 1963)

- Born: Monica Louise Horan; January 29, 1963 (age 63); Darby, Pennsylvania, U.S.
- Education: Hofstra University
- Occupation: Actress
- Years active: 1990–present
- Spouse: Philip Rosenthal (m. 1990)
- Children: 2

Monica Louise Horan (born January 29, 1963) is an American actress, best known for her role as Amy MacDougall-Barone on the television sitcom Everybody Loves Raymond.

== Life and career ==
Horan was born in Darby, Pennsylvania, the daughter of Selma (née Spencer), a clerk, and Robert J. Horan, a courthouse officer of Irish descent. She graduated from Archbishop Prendergast Catholic High School for Girls in Drexel Hill, Pennsylvania in 1980. Horan attended Hofstra University in Hempstead, New York, graduating with a degree in Theater Performance in 1984. She then moved to New York City where she performed in off-off Broadway theatre while working as a telephone sales agent for Telecharge. Horan met her future husband, Philip Rosenthal, who served as executive producer of Everybody Loves Raymond, while attending Hofstra, and she converted to Judaism before their marriage in 1990.

Horan is best known for her appearance in the part of Amy McDougall (later Barone), Robert Barone's off-on again girlfriend, then wife, on the CBS-TV sitcom series Everybody Loves Raymond. Horan appeared in 66 episodes of the series, making her first appearance in the episode titled "Who's Handsome?" (Season 1, episode #14). She currently lives in Los Angeles with her husband and their two children. Horan has guest-starred on the Hot in Cleveland series (Season 2) playing an Amish woman, and in 2017 was reunited with her Everybody Loves Raymond co-star Patricia Heaton when she guest-starred on a Season 8 episode of The Middle. She is featured in her husband's travel/food show, Somebody Feed Phil.

Horan's maternal grandfather was Jewish and her paternal grandfather was Irish. Horan is a Democrat.

== Filmography ==
=== Film ===
Year	Film	Role	Notes
2016	Pee-wee's Big Holiday	Ruby	
2016	Carpool	Tracy	Short film

=== Television ===
Year	Film	Role	Notes
1990	L.A. Law	Reporter #1	Episode: "Happy Trails"
1991	In Living Color		Episode: "Homey the Sellout: Part 2"
1993	Coach	Nurse	Episode: "The Pioneer Bowl"
1994	Maureen		Episode: "Jailbirds"
1996	In the House	April	Episode: "Come Back, Kid"
1997–2005	Everybody Loves Raymond	Amy MacDougall Barone	Recurring Role (Season 1–7); Series regular (Season 8–9)
2011	Hot in Cleveland	Sarah	Episode: "Where's Elka?"
2011	The Whole Truth		Episode: "Lost in Translation"
2013	Enlightened	Sharon	Episodes: "Revenge Play" & "Agent of Change"
2015	The Adventures of Mr. Clown	Monica	Episode: "Word of the Day: Mother"
2016-2019	The Bold and the Beautiful	Kieran Cannistra	Recurring role, 8 episodes
2017	The Middle	Anna Ferguson	Episode: "The Confirmation"
2019	Better Things	Jaia	Episode: "No Limits"
2021	The Corona Dialogues: a Dylan Brody project	Arlene Winter	Episode: "Conditional"

== Awards and nominations ==
Year	Award	Category	Nominated work	Result
2005	Screen Actors Guild Awards	Outstanding Performance by an Ensemble in a Comedy Series (with Peter Boyle, Brad Garrett, Patricia Heaton, Doris Roberts, Ray Romano & Madylin Sweeten)	Everybody Loves Raymond	Nominated
2006	Gracie Awards	Outstanding Supporting Actress in a Comedy Series	Everybody Loves Raymond	Won
2006	Screen Actors Guild Awards	Outstanding Performance by an Ensemble in a Comedy Series (with Peter Boyle, Brad Garrett, Patricia Heaton, Doris Roberts, Ray Romano & Madylin Sweeten)	Everybody Loves Raymond	Nominated
2017	Daytime Emmy Awards	Outstanding Guest Performer in a Drama Series	The Bold and the Beautiful	Nominated
