= Gary Halvorson =

American director

Gary S. Halvorson is an American director of television shows, stage and film, best known for directing and producing the NBC show, Friends and directing the CBS show, Everybody Loves Raymond. He is also known directing the movie, The Adventures of Elmo in Grouchland.

== Directing ==
Halvorson was trained as a classical pianist. He is primarily noted as the director of sitcoms such as Friends (of which he directed 55 episodes) and The Drew Carey Show. In 1999, he also made his directorial film debut The Adventures of Elmo in Grouchland, a children's film based on Sesame Street.

While working at the New York Metropolitan Opera for four years, he directed high-definition theater simulcasts of The Magic Flute (12/30/2006), I Puritani (1/6/2007), Il Barbiere di Siviglia (3/24/2007), Il Tabarro (4/28/2007), Roméo et Juliette (12/15/2007), Macbeth (1/11/2008), Peter Grimes (3/15/2008), La Bohème (4/5/2008), La fille du régiment (4/26/2008), the 2008-09 gala night opening with Renée Fleming (9/22/2008), Doctor Atomic (1/8/2008), Aida (10/23/2008),Thaïs (12/20/2008), Lucia di Lammermoor (2/7/2009), Madama Butterfly (3/7/2009), La Cenerentola (5/9/2009), Tosca (10/10/2009), Turandot (11/7/2009), Les Contes d'Hoffmann (12/19/2009), Carmen (1/16/2010), Armida (5/1/2010), Das Rheingold (10/9/2010), Don Pasquale (11/13/2010) and Don Carlo (12/11/2010).

Halvorson also directed Paul Simon's "You're The One" live concert in Paris, Europe, which aired on PBS and is available on DVD.

== Filmography ==
=== Film ===
Year	Title	Notes
1984	The Quintessential Peggy Lee	Direct-to-Video
1999	The Adventures of Elmo in Grouchland	
2018	The King and I	

=== Television ===
Year	Title	Notes
1976	Standing Room Only	— "Vanities"
1980	Broadway on Showtime	— "Little Johnny Jones"
1981	Jules Feiffer's Hold Me	TV movie
1982	The Country Girl	TV movie
1984	Hizzoner!	TV movie
1985–93	Kids Incorporated	Director (7 episodes)
1986	Solid Gold	Director (13 episodes)
1987–2008	Great Performances	Director (11 episodes)
1989	A Conversation with...	— "Betty White"
1991	Riders in the Sky	Director (11 episodes)
1991	On the Television	Director (38 episodes)
1992	Roundhouse	— "TV on Trial"
1992–94	Adventures in Wonderland	Director (14 episodes)
1993	Xuxa	Director (65 episodes)
1994	Herman's Head	— "You Say Tomato"
1994	Growing Up Funny	TV movie
1995	Muscle	Director (13 episodes)
1995–96	Minor Adjustments	Director (6 episodes)
1995–96	The Drew Carey Show	Director (2 episodes) — "Drew Gets Motivated" (1996) — "Isomers Have Distinct Characteristics" (1995)
1996	The Wayans Bros.	Director (2 episodes) — "Goin' to the Net" — "The Return of the Temptones"
1996–97	Roseanne	Director (8 episodes)
1996–97	Muppets Tonight	Director (11 episodes)
1996–98	Grace Under Fire	Director (3 episodes)
1996–99	Sabrina the Teenage Witch	Director (28 episodes) Producer (13 episodes)
1997	Bouncers	TV movie
1997	Teen Angel	Director (3 episodes)
1997–2001	The Metropolitan Opera Presents	Director (3 episodes)
1997–2004	Friends	Director (55 episodes)
1997–2005	Everybody Loves Raymond	Director (61 episodes)
1999	Whole World Comedy	— "Pilot"
1999	Norm	— "Norm vs. Norm"
1999–2000	Jesse	Director (7 episodes)
2000	Don Giovanni	TV movie
2001	Grounded for Life	— "Lily B. Goode"
2001	Everything But the Girl	TV movie
2001	The Back Page	TV movie
2001	Bliss	TV movie (Executive Producer)
2002	True West	TV movie
2002	Faith Hill: When the Lights Go Down	TV movie (also Producer)
2002	B.S.	TV movie
2002–2004	What I Like About You	Director (7 episodes)
2003	Regular Joe	Director (1 Episode) (also Executive Producer)
2003	These Guys	TV movie
2003–04	The Tracy Morgan Show	Director (3 episodes)
2004	Eddie's Father	TV movie
2004–05	Complete Savages	Director (2 episodes) — "The Complete Savages in... 'Hot Water' " (2005) — "Nick Kicks Butt" (2004)
2004–06	Joey	Director (9 episodes)
2004–07	Two and a Half Men	Director (34 episodes)
2005	Committed	Director (5 episodes)
2005	Kenny Chesney: Somewhere in the Sun	TV special
2005	Lies and the Wives We Tell Them To	TV movie
2005	Blue Skies	TV movie
2006	Grand Union	TV movie
2006	Lucky Louie	— "Pilot"
2007	Rules of Engagement	Director (4 episodes)
2007	'Til Death	— "No More Mr. Vice Guy"
2007	Elmo's Christmas Countdown	TV movie
2007	Making It Legal	TV movie
2008	Do Not Disturb	Director (2 episodes) — "Dosing" — "Birdcage"
2009	Canned	TV movie
2009–2011	True Jackson, VP	Director (16 episodes) Producer (26 episodes)
2010	Telepathetic	TV movie
2010–11	Better with You	Director (11 episodes)
2012	How to Be a Gentleman	Director (2 episodes) — "How to Be Shallow" — "How to Get Along with Your Boss's New Girlfriend"
2012	Duets	Director (8 episodes)
2012	Yo Gabba Gabba!	— "Gooble"
2012	Michael Buble: Home for the Holidays	TV special
2012–13	Marvin Marvin	Director (3 episodes)
2012–13	Work It	Director (3 episodes)
2013	Mom	Directors (2 episodes) — "A Small Nervous Breakdown and a Misplaced Fork" — "A Pee Stick and an Asian Raccoon"
2015	Your Family or Mine	— "The Couch"
2015	The Dunes Club	TV movie

== Awards and nominations ==
In 1996, Halvorson was awarded a Daytime Emmy Award for "Outstanding Directing in a Children's Series" for Disney's Adventures in Wonderland. In 2004, he was awarded an Emmy for "Outstanding Special Class Directing" for the 78th Annual Macy's Thanksgiving Day Parade. He has also been nominated for "Outstanding Directing for a Comedy Series", for his work on Everybody Loves Raymond, shown on CBS.
