= Lew Schneider =

American actor/comedian

- Born: July 18, 1961 (age 65); Chapel Hill, North Carolina, US
- Occupations: Actor, comedian, producer, writer
- Years active: 1989–present

Lew Schneider (born July 18, 1961) is an American television producer, writer, director, actor and comedian.

== Career ==
In the fall of 1989, Schneider landed his first regular TV job as the host of the Nickelodeon game show, Make the Grade. He hosted the show until 1990. His stand-up act was featured on HBO's One Night Stand in 1992 and in guest appearances on Comedy Central's Dr. Katz, Professional Therapist. He starred in two TV sitcoms, Wish You Were Here (1990) and Down the Shore (1992–93).

Schneider appeared as Marty in the 2004 film comedy Seeing Other People.

Schneider began writing for television in 1993. His credits include The George Wendt Show, The John Larroquette Show, and The Naked Truth. He began writing for Everybody Loves Raymond in its first season and also served as a supervising and executive producer on the series. As part of the production team for Raymond, he was the recipient of two Emmys for Outstanding Comedy Series (2003 and 2005). Since Everybody Loves Raymond, he has written for the television shows American Dad!, The New Adventures of Old Christine and the Peabody Award-winning Men of a Certain Age. He is currently an executive producer and director on ABC's The Goldbergs.

Schneider's essays have been published in the anthologies, Afterbirth: Stories You Won't Read in a Parenting Magazine (St. Martin's Press) and Fathers and Sons and Sports (ESPN Books). He has also taught a writing course at the University of Pennsylvania.

He can frequently be heard as a contributor on The Madeleine Brand Show on KPCC.

== Personal life ==
Schneider was born in Chapel Hill, North Carolina, and grew up in Brookline, Massachusetts, graduating from Brookline High School in 1979. He graduated cum laude from the University of Pennsylvania in 1983. While at Penn he got his first taste of sketch comedy as a member of the all-male musical and comedy performing troupe The Mask and Wig Club.

Schneider married Elizabeth Abbe in 1986, and the couple have three sons.
