= Mike Royce =

American screenwriter

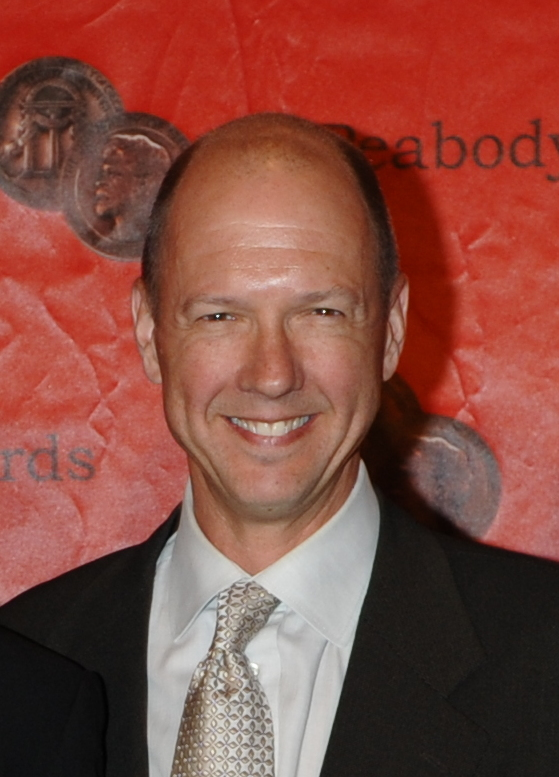
- Royce at the 70th Annual Peabody Awards
- Born: 1964 (age 61–62)
- Education: Ithaca College
- Occupations: Screenwriter; television producer
- Years active: 1988–present

Mike Royce (born 1964) is an American screenwriter and television producer.

== Education ==
Raised in Syracuse, New York, Royce graduated from Jamesville-Dewitt High School in 1982, then went on to film school at Ithaca College where he graduated in 1986.

== Career ==
From 1986 to 1999, Royce was a stand-up comedian in New York City. For several years, he was also a warmup comedian for such shows as The Maury Povich Show, Viva Variety, and Spin City. In 1997, he got his first job as a writer on MTV's Apartment 2F, which starred Randy and Jason Sklar. In 1999, Royce joined the writing staff of Everybody Loves Raymond, where he eventually worked his way up to the position of executive producer for the last two seasons. In 2005, Louis C.K. asked Royce to be the executive producer and show runner of a new sitcom, HBO's Lucky Louie.

In 2008, TNT ordered a pilot for a new series written by Royce and Ray Romano. By January 2009, TNT had ordered 10 episodes for the new series Men of a Certain Age, which premiered on Monday December 7, 2009 at 10:00. TNT picked up Men of a Certain Age for a second season as the ratings have increased with men in the age demographic of 25 to 54. On July 15, 2011, TNT cancelled the series after two seasons.

In 2011, Mike Royce and his Snowpants Productions company signed a deal with 20th Century Fox Television. In addition to two pilots, he produced two series under his Fox deal, 1600 Penn and Enlisted.

In 2015, he moved to Sony Pictures in an overall deal and developed a pilot for CBS, as well as the reimagining of Norman Lear's '70s sitcom "One Day at a Time" for Netflix

In 2017, One Day at a Time premiered on Netflix starring Justina Machado and Rita Moreno. A reimagining of the 1975 Norman Lear sitcom, Royce co-created the 2017 version with Gloria Calderon Kellett. He is executive producer and co-showrunner of the series, alongside Ms. Kellett.

== Awards and nominations ==
Royce was nominated for an Emmy Award in 2003 for Outstanding Writing for a Comedy Series, for the Everybody Loves Raymond episode "Counseling". He and the other Raymond writers and producers won the Emmy for Best Comedy twice, in 2003, and 2005.

| Year | Award | Category | Work | Result | Ref(s) |
|---|---|---|---|---|---|
| 2003 | 55th Primetime Emmy Awards | Outstanding Comedy Series | Everybody Loves Raymond | Won | |
| 2003 | 55th Primetime Emmy Awards | Outstanding Writing for a Comedy Series | Everybody Loves Raymond | Nominated | |
| 2004 | 56th Primetime Emmy Awards | Outstanding Comedy Series | Everybody Loves Raymond | Nominated | |
| 2005 | 57th Primetime Emmy Awards | Outstanding Comedy Series | Everybody Loves Raymond | Won | |
| 2005 | 57th Primetime Emmy Awards | Outstanding Writing for a Comedy Series | Everybody Loves Raymond | Nominated | |
| 2005 | 57th Primetime Emmy Awards | Outstanding Variety, Music, or Comedy Special | Everybody Loves Raymond: The Last Laugh | Nominated | |
| 2010 | Writers Guild of America Awards | Television: New Series | Men of a Certain Age | Nominated | |
