= Leslie Caveny =

American film and television writer

- Born: United States
- Occupation: Writer

Leslie Caveny is an American film and television writer and producer. Caveny was a staff writer and producer for Everybody Loves Raymond for several years in which she shared the Primetime Emmy Award for Outstanding Comedy Series.

She later went on to write the screenplay for Penelope. She co-wrote the screenplay for the cancelled Pixar film Newt. Caveny is also a playwright. Her published play "Love of a Pig" originated at Theatre West in Los Angeles, and moved to Dublin and New York City. She also had another, The Survival of the Fiddest, at Theatre West in 1995, where she continues as a member artist.

Caveny grew up in a housing community called Jefferson Estates in West Windsor Township, New Jersey, and attended West Windsor-Plainsboro High School (now West Windsor-Plainsboro High School South) until 1978, when she transferred to a private boarding school, Peddie School, in Hightstown, New Jersey, from 1978 to 1980, graduating in 1980. Caveny attended Boston University.
