= Tucker Cawley =

American television comedy writer and producer

Tucker Cawley is an American television comedy writer and producer, best known for writing episodes for Everybody Loves Raymond. He has also written for Men of a Certain Age, Parks and Recreation, Up All Night, and the short-lived Kelsey Grammer sitcom Hank. He has won three Emmy Awards, including the 2003 Emmy for Outstanding Writing for a Comedy Series.

== Career ==
He is a 1986 graduate of Gonzaga College High School (Washington, DC) and a 1990 graduate of the University of Virginia.

He has written episodes for Everybody Loves Raymond, Out of Practice, Welcome to the Captain, Parks and Recreation, Hank, Men of a Certain Age, Up All Night, The Mindy Project, Growing Up Fisher, The Odd Couple, Superior Donuts, A Million Little Things, Merry Happy Whatever, and Home Economics.

== Awards and nominations ==
He won three Emmys for Everybody Loves Raymond, including the 2003 Emmy for best writing for a comedy.
