= Philip Rosenthal =

American television writer and producer (born 1960)

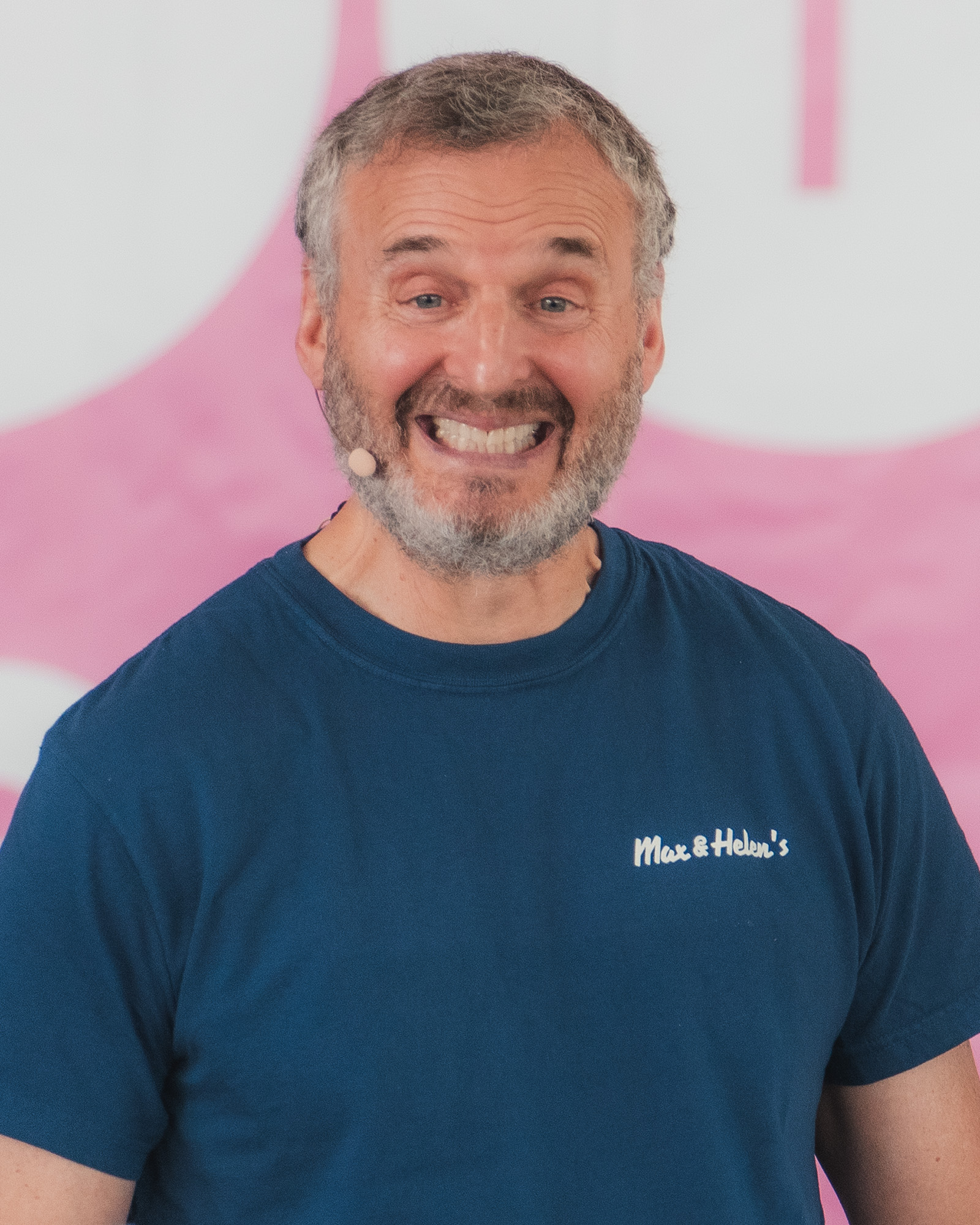
- Rosenthal in 2026
- Born: January 27, 1960 (age 66); Queens, New York City, U.S.
- Education: Hofstra University
- Occupations: Television writer, producer
- Years active: 1989–present
- Known for: Everybody Loves Raymond; I'll Have What Phil's Having; Somebody Feed Phil
- Spouse: Monica Horan (m. 1990)
- Children: 2, including Lily
- Parent(s): Helen K. Rosenthal; Max Rosenthal

Philip Rosenthal (born January 27, 1960) is an American television writer and producer who was the creator, writer, and executive producer of the CBS sitcom Everybody Loves Raymond (1996–2005). In recent years, he has presented food and travel documentaries I'll Have What Phil's Having on PBS and Somebody Feed Phil on Netflix.

== Biography and career ==
Rosenthal's parents were both born in Germany: his mother Helen (1933–2019) in Hamburg and his father Max (1926–2021) in Berlin; after surviving a concentration camp in France, his mother moved to Cuba after World War II, then to Manhattan, where she met her husband, who had left Nazi Germany shortly after Kristallnacht. Rosenthal was born to a Jewish family in Queens, New York City, but spent most of his childhood living in New City, New York, located in Rockland County. He attended Clarkstown North High School where he became very active in the school's drama club, Cue 'N Curtain, and in theatre. Rosenthal graduated from Clarkstown North in 1977. After high school, he attended Hofstra University, from which he graduated in 1981.

In the early 1980s, Rosenthal was an actor in New York City before shifting his focus to production work, becoming a writer and producer of such shows as Coach with Craig T. Nelson and the short-lived Baby Talk.

Rosenthal's largest commercial success and longest-running project was the sitcom Everybody Loves Raymond. The show was co-produced by Ray Romano, and was based in part on Romano's comedy material. Rosenthal's wife, actress Monica Horan, played the role of Amy MacDougall-Barone, the off-and-on girlfriend (wife after season 7) of Robert Barone (Brad Garrett) in the series. Over the objections or reservations of the other cast members, Rosenthal and Romano made the decision to end the series. Twenty-one of the show's episodes were written by Rosenthal or a co-writer.

Rosenthal has occasionally acted as well, in projects such as James L. Brooks' Spanglish, The Simpsons Movie, Curb Your Enthusiasm, 30 Rock, The TV Set, Walk Hard: The Dewey Cox Story, and Nobody Wants This.

Rosenthal is the author of the book You're Lucky You're Funny: How Life Becomes a Sitcom, which was published on October 21, 2006. He recounts how his life led to the success of Everybody Loves Raymond.

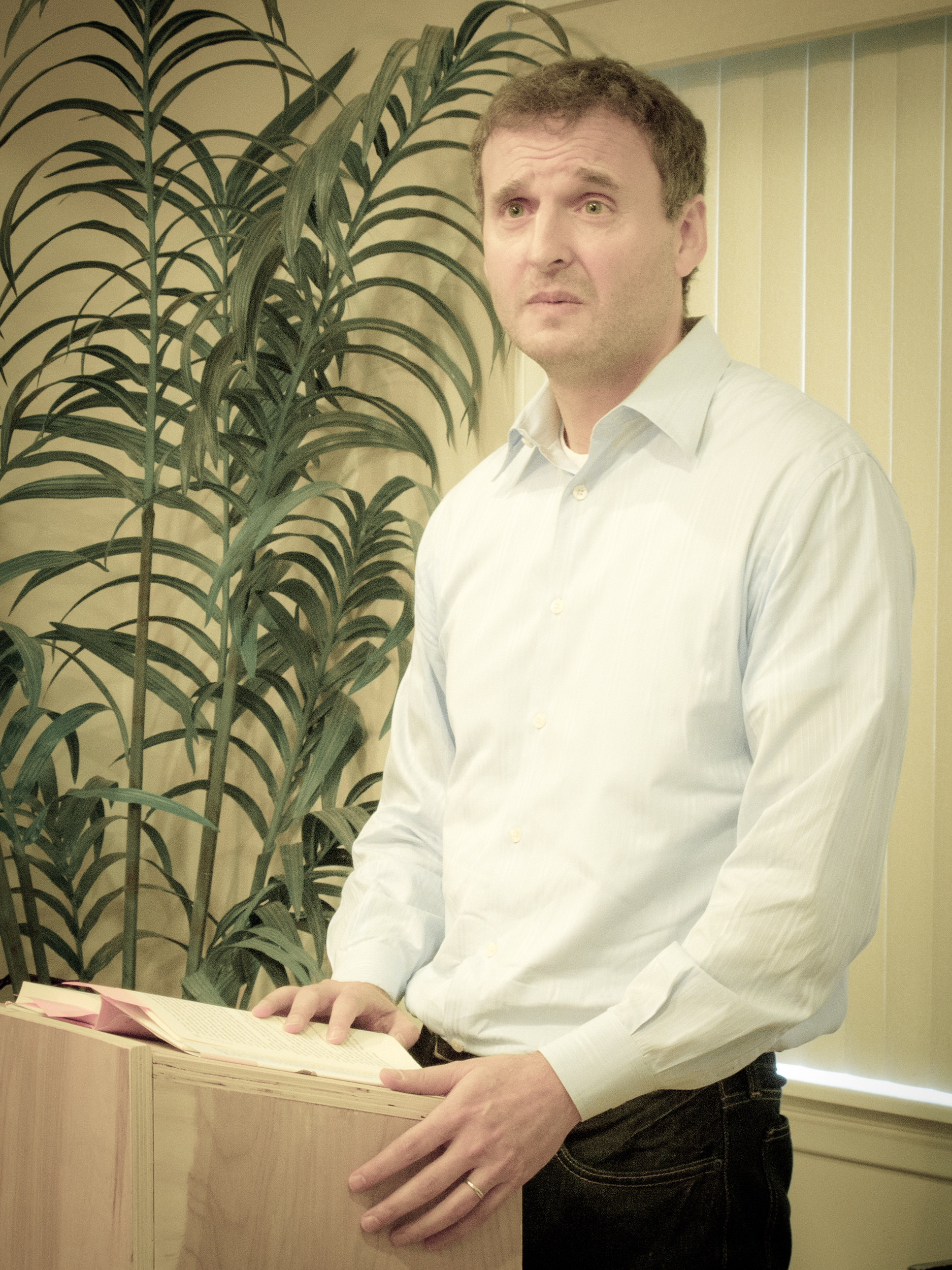
Rosenthal in 2011

Rosenthal directed President Bill Clinton in a White House Correspondents' Dinner video, which was shown to wide acclaim at the April 2000 event. Rosenthal co-wrote the 9/11 telethon America: A Tribute to Heroes, which aired on all four networks, and won a Peabody Award and an Emmy nomination for Outstanding Writing. Rosenthal wrote and directed a documentary film for Sony Pictures called Exporting Raymond, which depicts his efforts to adapt Everybody Loves Raymond for Russian television, despite his having little knowledge of Russian culture.

In August 2015, he was one of 98 members of the Los Angeles Jewish community who signed an open letter supporting the proposed nuclear agreement between Iran and six world powers led by the United States "as being in the best interest of the United States and Israel."

Beginning on September 28, 2015, PBS presented the six-episode television series I'll Have What Phil's Having, in which Rosenthal goes to locations around the world to explore their food culture. After six episodes, the series was not renewed. On January 12, 2018, Netflix premiered a reworked version of the show, titled Somebody Feed Phil. His brother Richard "Rich" Rosenthal serves as an executive producer.

In addition to the film industry, Rosenthal became involved in the dining business. His newest investment is the diner "Max and Helen's", in partnership with award-winning chef Nancy Silverton in the Los Angeles neighborhood of Larchmont Village.

=== Books ===
Just Try It! Someplace New! (A Phil & Lil Book) (2026) (with Lily Rosenthal)

Phil's Favorites: Recipes from Friends and Family to Make at Home (A Cookbook) (2025)

Just Try It! (Phil & Lil) (2024) (with Lily Rosenthal)

Somebody Feed Phil the Book: Untold Stories, Behind-the-Scenes Photos and Favorite Recipes: A Cookbook (2022)

You're Lucky You're Funny: How Life Becomes a Sitcom (2007)

== Philanthropy ==
Rosenthal serves on the Creative Council of Represent.Us, a nonpartisan anti-corruption organization.

He and the Rosenthal Family Foundation launched a national campaign called "Somebody Feed the People" to support organizations that provided meals to voters waiting in long lines during the 2020 United States presidential election, matching contributions up to $250,000.

== Personal life ==
Rosenthal married Monica Horan, whom he met in college at Hofstra, in 1990. They have 2 children, Lily, who has written several children's books with him, and Ben. They live in Los Angeles.
