= Drake's Cakes =

Brand of American baked goods

Drake's

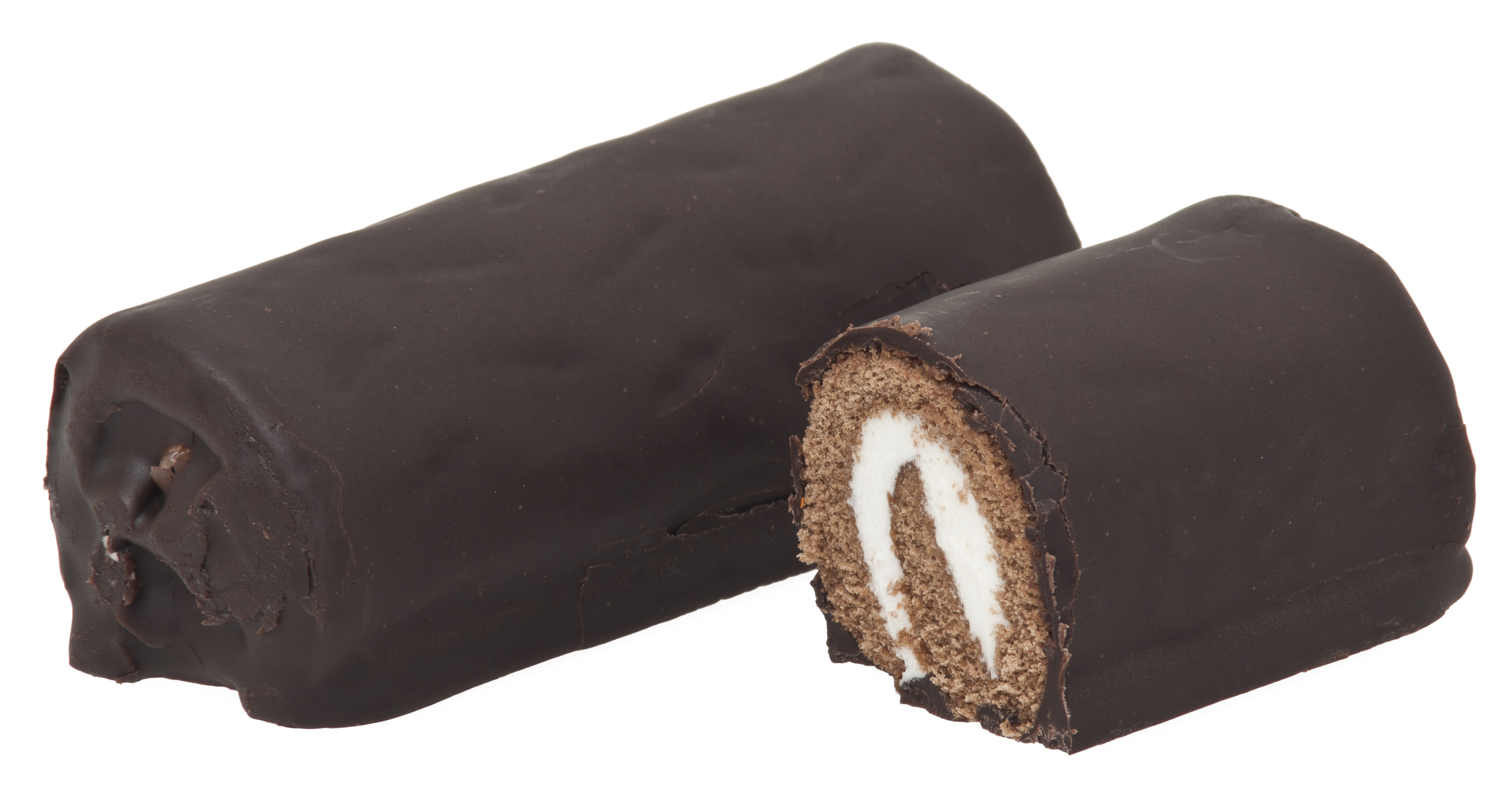
- Drake's Yodels
- Product type: Baked goods
- Current owner: McKee Foods
- Produced by: McKee Foods
- Country: United States
- Introduced: November 14, 1896; 129 years ago
- Headquarters: New York City (founding); Wayne, New Jersey (at time of bankruptcy); Collegedale, Tennessee (current)
- Markets: Worldwide
- Previous owners: List: The N.E. Drake Baking Company (1896–1900); National Biscuit Company (1900–1902); Drake Brothers Company (1902–1924); Drake Bakeries, Inc. (1924–1986); Ralston Purina (1986–1987); Rock Capital Partners (1987–1990); Culinar, Inc. (1990–1998); Interstate Bakeries Corporation (1998–2013)
- Website: www.drakescake.com

Drake's is a brand of American baked goods. The company was founded by Newman E. Drake in 1896 in Harlem, New York, as The N.E. Drake Baking Company, but it is now owned by McKee Foods. The company makes snack cake products, such as Devil Dogs, Funny Bones, Coffee Cakes, Ring Dings, and Yodels. Drake's has traditionally been marketed primarily in the Northeastern U.S., but it expanded to the Mid-Atlantic and Southeastern U.S. regions in 2016. The products are made under the Orthodox Union kosher certification guidelines.

== History ==
Drake's other products

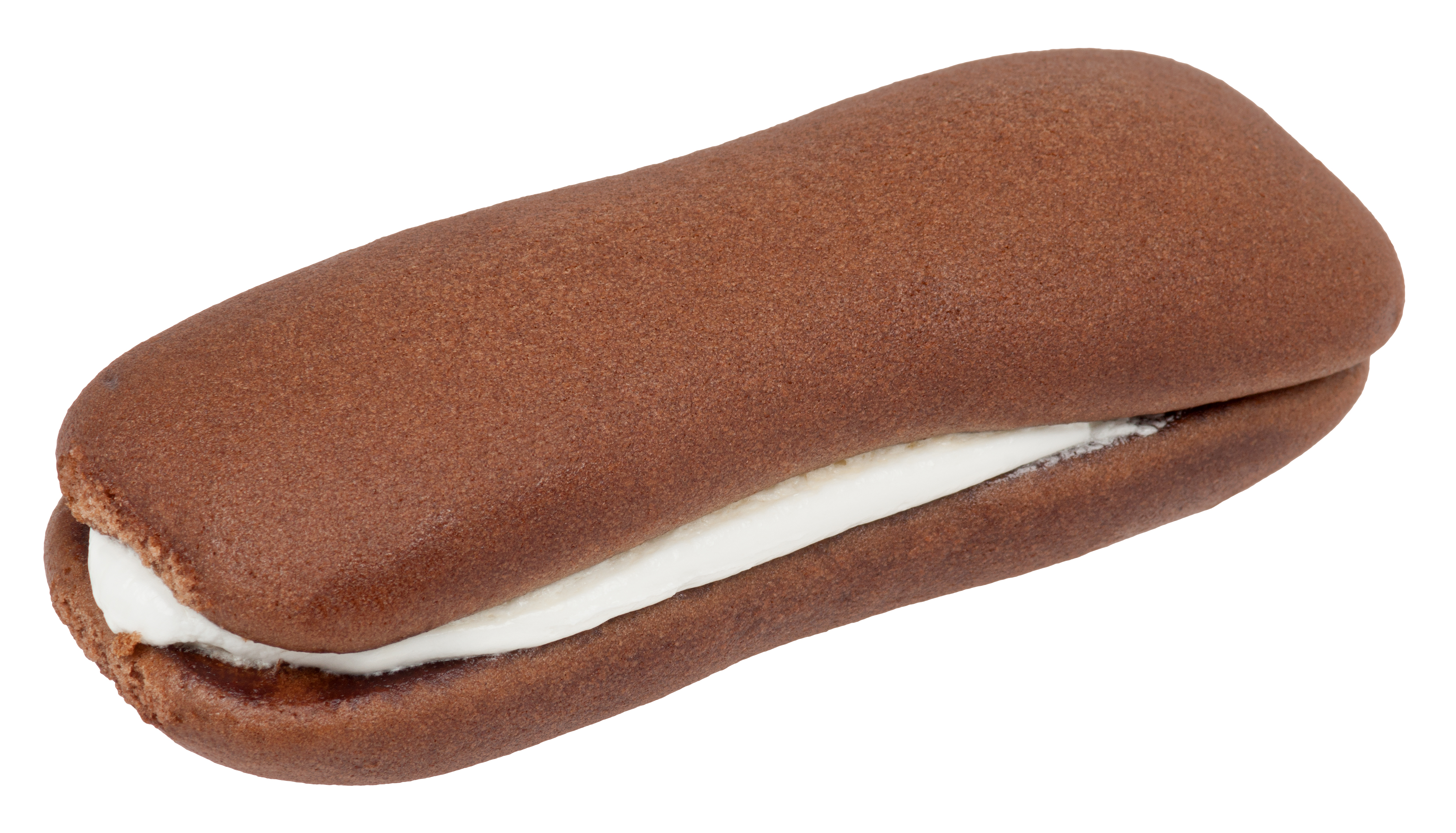
Devil Dog

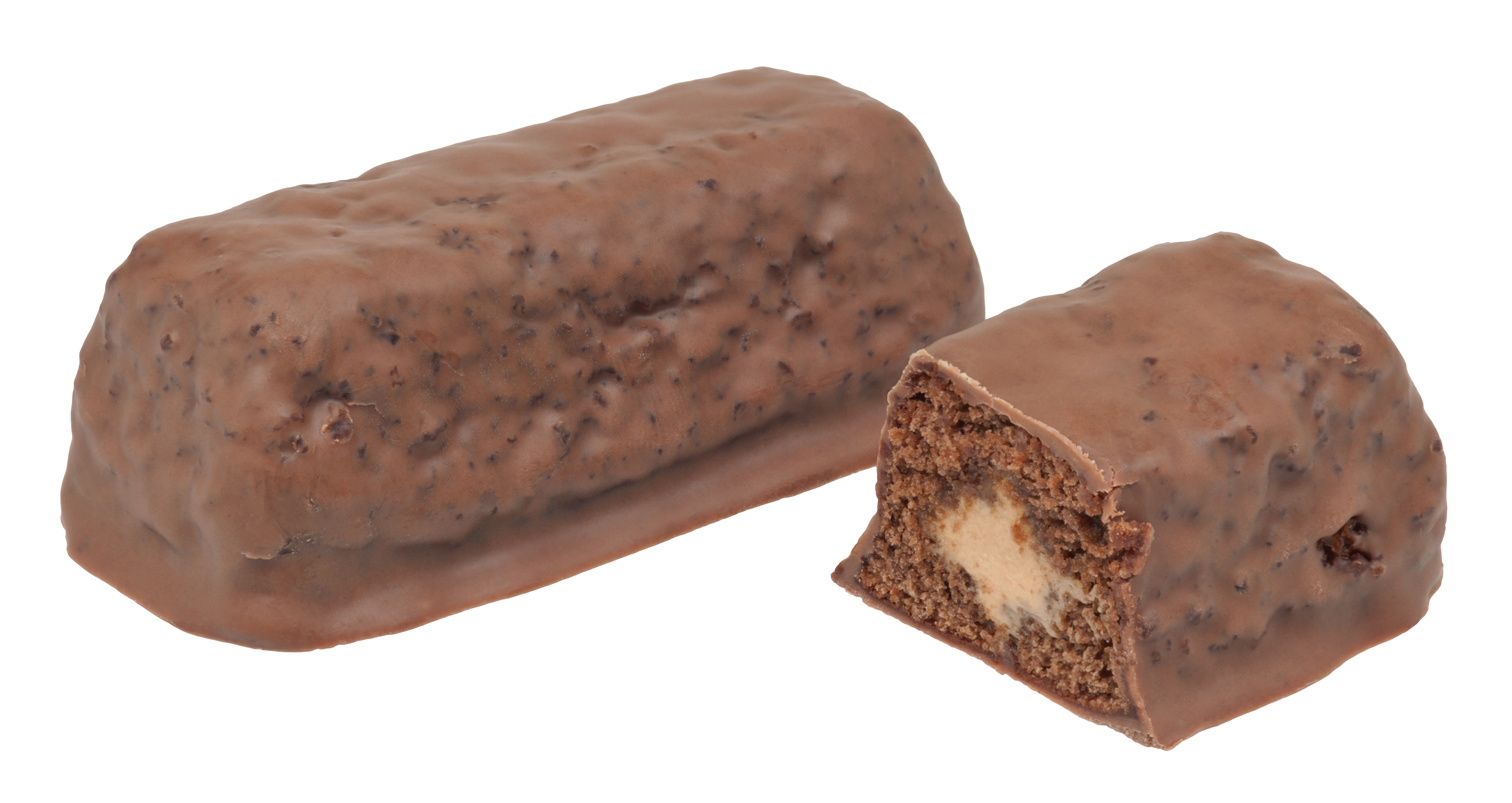
Funny Bones

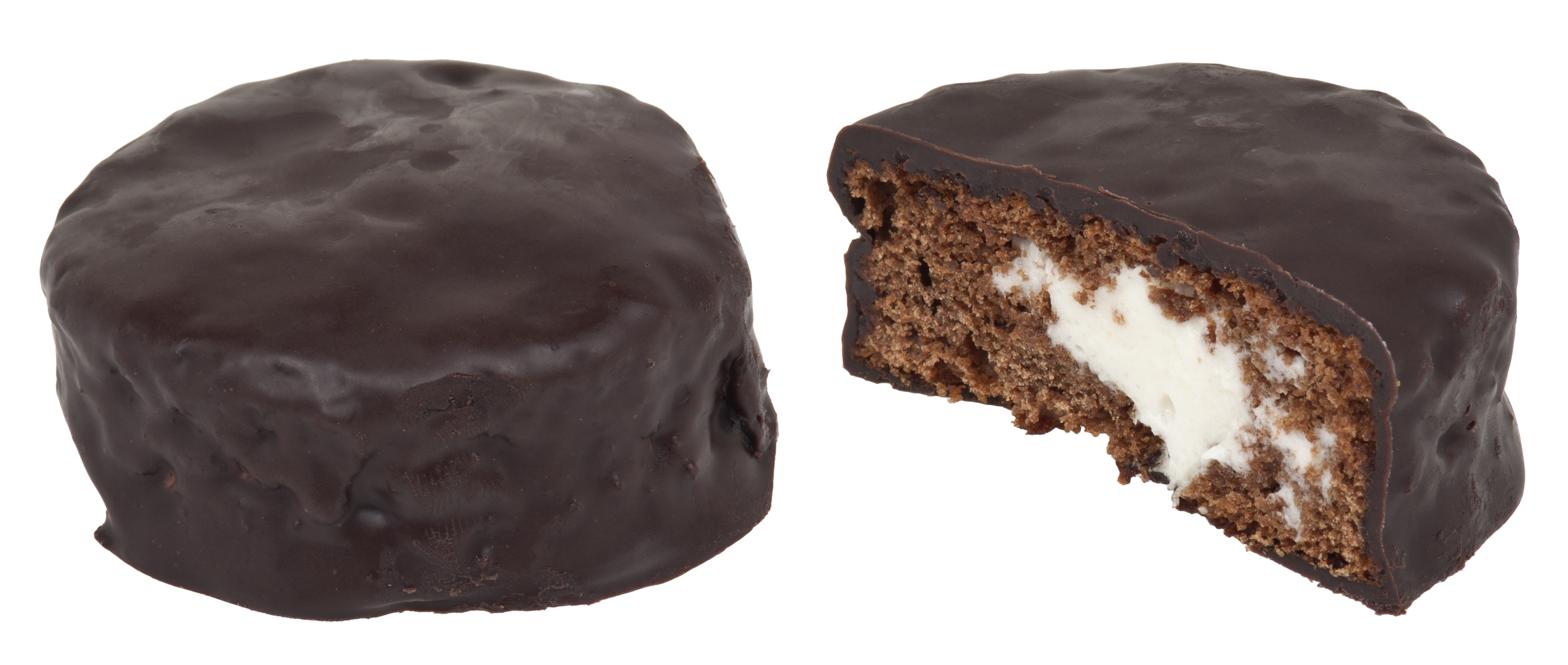
Ring Dings

=== Early years ===
Drake's brand began as The N.E. Drake Baking Company, incorporated on November 14, 1896, in New York City and founded by Newman E. Drake. The first bakery was in Harlem at 36–38 West 135th Street.

Drake's youngest brother Judson was working with him at the founding, and his brother Charles was with him in the later business in Brooklyn. Judson left the business in 1898 for the National Biscuit Company where he had a long and well-regarded career in bakery management. Charles was a vice president for the Brooklyn business, but he sold his interest and retired in 1907. At some point, all four of Newman's sons worked in the business.

Newman Drake came into this entrepreneurial venture with experience in large scale commercial baking. In 1888, he joined Vanderveer and Holmes Biscuit Company, and he had become a salesman traveling internationally for this cracker business by 1894. He was traveling in England on business in 1893–94 when he observed commercially baked fine cakes sold in grocery stores, and he was inspired to bring the idea to America.

By March 1898, retailer ads featured Drake's pound cakes by brand name in various flavors. The ads stated that the products were baked fresh daily and sold for 17 cents per pound. In 1900, retailer ads featured Drake's layer cakes with chocolate or vanilla icing at 18 cents. One Drake's ad touted that the price was half of what it would cost to make at home. By 1901, retailer ads referred to Drake's "celebrated" pound cakes and included Drake's macaroons.

=== National Biscuit Company ===
In the 1890s, the cracker industry consolidated in a multitiered fashion. In 1898, the three major players consolidated into one large enterprise, the National Biscuit Company, later known as Nabisco. As early as 1899, but definitively by November 1900, the National Biscuit Company had purchased the Drake bakery and referred to the bakery as the N.E. Drake Baking Co. Branch. Retailer ads show that the N.E. Drake's Famous Loaf Cakes continued to sell under that brand name at least to December 30, 1902. The Drake Baking Company was dissolved in 1903, however National Biscuit Company continued to produce cakes and macaroons at the same Harlem bakery at least into 1908, but the products were under brand names other than Drake, for example Regina, Golden Glory, and Imperial. It is not known how Newman Drake was able to hold onto the Drake brand for later Drake baking enterprises, but National Biscuit Company moved onto other brand names.

=== Drake Brothers Company ===
On December 4, 1902, Drake reestablished his business as Drake Brothers Company with his brother Charles and his brother-in-law Frank S. Vreeland and by at least May 10, 1903, Drake was operating a bakery at 1006 Wallabout Market in Brooklyn, New York. Newman was president, his brother Charles was vice president, and sons John Harold and Walter were bakers. By 1904, Newman's third son, Arthur, was working in the business as a salesman.

An article covering a Brooklyn food show in April 1904 indicated that Drake continued to produce pound cakes, macaroons, and other cakes at the Brooklyn bakery. The firm was noted as having been the first to have produced cakes in large quantities for grocery stores, which must reference the origins of the Harlem bakery. The new bakery was servicing over 1,000 stores in Brooklyn and extended "over a large portion of surrounding country."

In 1904, Drake Brothers began sales recognition dinners that became grand affairs with speakers, guests, and monetary awards recognizing sales performance. A photograph of the fourteenth annual dinner in 1917, captures the grandeur of the event held at Silsbe and Son Oyster Bar and Chop House in Manhattan (established 1863), with attendees in suits, custom menus on the tables, tuxedoed wait staff, and lavish décor.

In 1905, Drake opened a bakery in Boston's Roxbury neighborhood at 83-85 Savin Street with J. Harold Drake, Newman's son, as manager.

The Wallabout Market bakery expanded in 1909 with the addition into 1704–1705 Wallabout Market and the addition of a 16-foot oven. Also in 1909, Drake's commissioned "Drake's Cake Walk", sheet music for a "rag" or "ragtime" music for piano.

In 1910, Newman Vanderveer Drake, Newman E. Drake's youngest son, joined the firm in Wallabout Market.

In May 1913, Drake Brothers announced that they would build a new five story bakery built of brick and concrete on Clinton Avenue in Brooklyn on a lot 80 by 125 feet. The ovens were on the top floor to allow the heat to escape, mixing was on the fourth floor, packing was on the third floor, offices on the second floor, and shipping and receiving on the ground level as seen in photographs of the facility. The facility had a laundry to clean the white uniforms. There was a rooftop garden that served as a break area.

=== Early branding and advertising ===
Drake Brothers was recognized in a leading advertising magazine of the day for branding and advertising efforts. With much of the product sold by the pound, the products were vulnerable to substitution by retailers. Drake implemented pan liners that were perforated with the Drake's brand name so that the product could be identified by the end consumer. Drake's advertised this feature. Drake also made wide use of the trademark on trucks, advertising, and "everything that leaves our bakery".

A White (brand) three-ton truck in the small fleet at the Drake's Boston bakery was featured in a trucking publication in 1914 for having operated for 14 months without the loss of a day.

In 1920 and again in 1927, Drake's added garages to store their fleet of vehicles just down the street from the bakery at 35-37 Clinton Avenue and 41-43 Clinton Avenue.

In the early 1900s, Newman Drake was looking for something new and different to grace the door of his delivery trucks. Joseph Gross, a German immigrant who came to the U.S. in 1898 and worked as striper painting lines and designs on horse wagons and automobiles, drew the original Drake's logo which consisted of a duck with a chef's hat holding a tray of cakes. Drake was so pleased with the design that Gross received a bonus in the amount of $500 for his work.

=== Drake Bakeries, Inc. ===
On July 29, 1924, a new corporation was formed as Drake Bakeries, Incorporated. Ralph Ward became president of the company. Ralph Ward was the grandson of the founder of Ward Baking Company, a major bakery enterprise founded in 1849 that went on to be Continental Baking and introduce the Hostess brand, develop competitive products like Twinkies, and eventually after transitioning to Interstate Bakeries Corporation, own the Drake's brand in 1998, 74 years later, after having made an unsuccessful attempt to gain the Drake's brand in 1986.

The preferred shares of Drake Bakeries, Incorporated were owned by Bessemer Investment Company, the investment arm of the Bessemer Trust which was founded in 1907 by Henry Phipps from proceeds from the sale of Carnegie Steel, which Phipps founded with Andrew Carnegie. Newman E. Drake and other Drake family members, Ralph Ward and other Ward family investments, B. B. Vanderveer, and others were among the closely held group of common stockholders of Drake Bakeries.

In 1925, Drake Bakeries advertised with full page ads a new freshness policy where they would remove products from store shelves after 48 hours. The ad also featured recipes for three Drake's products, highlighting to readers the wholesome ingredients used and how much easier it would be to buy the same product you would make at home from Drake. The ad also introduced the products in cartons, termed the "Fresh Cake" package.

In 1925, Drake's began a series of collectable cards including two featuring Babe Ruth. These cards had brand information on the back. Drake's baseball cards continued for decades.

Also in 1925, work began on a new three story bakery in Irvington, New Jersey, near Newark.

One of the top sellers for Drake's still today, Devil Dogs, was filed for trademark protection in 1926 and shown as first sold in commerce on June 15, 1926. The owner of the trademark was S. Gumpert Co., Inc. of Brooklyn.

Yankee Doodles, a chocolate cupcake with creme filling and no icing, was first sold in interstate commerce in 1928 by the Yankee Cake Company of Providence, Rhode Island. The firm built a bakery around that time at 24 Althea Street in Providence. In 1936, Drake's was running ads for Yankee Doodles under the Drake's brand. Around 1937, Drake Bakeries was sharing the building with Yankee Cake Company and later became sole occupant. The "Old Formula Book" of Drake Bakeries from the late 1930s to early 1940s references the Providence bakery. The Yankee Cake Company was stated as a wholly owned subsidiary of Drake Bakeries in a 1941 article.

On August 28, 1928, Drake Bakeries was purchased by acquisition of common stock by Central Distributors, Inc. Central Distributors was formed March 9, 1928, by Ralph Ward, his cousin, William Ward, and Benjamin Titman as a holding company for food companies. Drake common shareholders received shares in Central Distributors, Inc. Newman E. Drake and Ralph Ward were signatories of documents related to the purchase.

Less than a year later, on August 8, 1929, The Borden Company purchased Central Distributors, Inc. for Borden stock, gaining control of Drake Bakeries, Inc. as it was a company held within Central Distributors, Inc. Ralph Ward became a vice president within The Borden Company in October 1931 while continuing to serve as President of Drake Bakeries, Inc. without interruption.

In 1929, Drake begins advertising that the products are wrapped in cellophane, noting that shoppers could see what they were buying and that it was a "flavor-sealed" package.

=== 1930s and 1940s ===
Newman E. Drake, the founder of the business, died March 18, 1930, at 69 years old. one month after its founder's death his wife Elizabeth Drake and their son Arthur Drake took over to continue running the business, in April 1930.

In December 1930, Drake's Coffee Cakes, still one of the top-selling products, came on the scene in newspaper advertisements that mentioned a radio broadcast that offered to share the recipe. The advertisement is another example of Drake's forward stance promoting product quality. The ad is assumed to be the introduction of coffee cakes because the product is not listed in previous advertisements, even as late as 1929, that provide a listing of cake products.

On August 28, 1933, Drake Bakeries Incorporated is established at 2224 N. Marshall Street in Philadelphia. In 1941, in addition to the aforementioned Brooklyn, Boston, Irvington, NJ, and Providence, bakeries, the Philadelphia branch is noted as well as two distribution points in the Bronx and Jamaica (Queens) in an article. Photographs of delivery vehicles for the Philadelphia branch exist, but very little other information has been found regarding this bakery. By the mid-1950s, an order ticket showing the various Drake's bakeries does not include a Philadelphia bakery.

Drake's participated in the 1939 New York World's Fair (in Queens) with Drake's cake stand providing cake to attendees. They produced a miniature version of the Big Duck structure built in Long Island, under the condition that it was to be destroyed following the fair.

During World War II, Drake's production was limited due to rationing of sugar and shortening. Ralph Ward, president of the Drake Bakeries, Incorporated, was the president of the American Bakers Association (American Institute of Baking) in the 1942–1944 term and chairman of the War Advisory Committee of the American Bakers Association.

By the end of 1949, Drake Bakeries had a bakery at 21 – 30 44th Avenue in Long Island City, NY (Queens).

=== 1950s and 1960s ===
While the Devil Dogs brand was first owned by another company (see 1926), Devil Dogs are marketed in advertisements under the Drake's brand in 1956.

Drake's Ring Dings launched in January 1958, still one of the top-selling items.

Drake's Funny Bones launched on April 12, 1961.

On April 18, 1962, Drake Bakeries had a case heard in front of the United States Supreme Court.

Drake's Yodels launched on August 15, 1962, and continues to be one of their top-selling items.

Drake's Fruit Doodles, a trademarked name for fruit pies, were introduced on October 29, 1964, but were known as Drake's Fruit Pies by the early 1970s.

In 1969, a bakery in Wayne, New Jersey, was built to supplement the existing bakeries in Brooklyn, Boston, Long Island City, and Newark.

=== 1980s and 1990s ===
In 1981, Drake Bakeries conducted a contest to name the duck mascot. Webster was the selected name.

On July 1, 1986, Borden announced the sale of Drake Bakeries to Ralston Purina Co. to be part of their Continental Baking Co. subsidiary. Ralston Purina paid $115 million for Drake. Tasty Baking Co. filed a federal antitrust suit against Ralston in August 1986 and was successful with efforts to block Ralston's Continental Baking subsidiary from holding the Drake's brand along with its existing Hostess brand.

On July 13, 1987, Ralston Purina Co. announced its agreement to sell Drake Bakeries to a private group led by Drake management and funded by support from Rock Capital Partners L.P. Purina completed the sale of the Drake Bakery unit which was sold for $176 million on August 22, 1987. Rock Capital Partners was formed by the heirs of John D. Rockefeller with funds from mortgaging Rockefeller Center.

By September 1987, Drake management informed the route salespeople that they would need to buy their routes or lose their jobs as a cost savings effort and an opportunity to increase earnings for the salespeople. Union officials representing the route salespeople condemned the effort.

In April 1988, Drake Bakeries held a 100th-anniversary celebration with the cutting of a 500-pound Ring Ding. Evidence points to 1896 as being the founding of the company, and 1888 was simply the year its founder entered the baking industry (in another company), so this celebration was technically about eight years early.

On December 31, 1990, Rock Capital Partners sold Drake Bakeries to Culinar Inc. for $35 million. Culinar was a CA$500 million sales Canadian food company based in Montreal that held the popular Canadian cake brand Vachon.

Culinar refocused on improved bakery operations resulting in greater efficiencies, gained work rule concessions, and reconfigured routes resulting in improved profitability.

On August 16, 1998, Interstate Bakeries Corporation completed the purchase of Drake Bakeries from Culinar Inc. Interstate Bakeries added Drake's to their line including the Hostess brand of competitive products. In the fiscal year, Hostess had one major acquisition (Drake) and one minor acquisition (My Bread Baking Co.) with the total paid of $106 million. If the purchase price was proportional to sales, Interstate may have paid in the neighborhood of $80 million for Drake Baking. Gilles Boudreau, Vice President and Controller for Drake during the Culinar era and later Vice President of Finance with Interstate Bakeries stated that Hostess paid around $100 million for Drake Bakeries.

=== 2000s and 2010s ===
Hostess Brands Inc. (formerly Interstate Bakeries Corporation) filed for bankruptcy a second time on January 11, 2012 and eventually filed for liquidation on November 16, 2012.

On April 9, 2013, McKee Foods Corporation completed the purchase of the Drake's brand for $27.5 million out of liquidation from Hostess Brands. McKee Foods reintroduced the Drake's top-selling items on September 22, 2013.

During the fall of 2017, and without warning to consumers, McKee stopped production and distribution of Drake's Coffee Cakes. On July 27, 2018, McKee announced that Drake's Coffee Cakes would return in the fall.

== In popular culture ==
Drake's Coffee Cakes are mentioned in the season 3 episode of the NBC sitcom Seinfeld titled "The Suicide", which aired on January 29, 1992. In addition, in the season 5 episode "The Dinner Party", which aired on February 3, 1994, George Costanza suggests bringing Ring Dings and Pepsi to a dinner party. As a result, the brand has become associated with Seinfeld. In the 1993 movie A Bronx Tale, the character C says a man is called Frankie Coffeecake because his face looked like a Drake's coffee cake.

They also became somewhat associated with comedian Rosie O'Donnell when she gave them away on her TV talk show. Yodels are referenced in the season 4 episode of the CBS sitcom Everybody Loves Raymond titled "Robert's Rodeo", which aired on February 7, 2000. Drake's Devil Dogs are mentioned in the season 4 episode of the HBO series The Sopranos titled "The Weight", which aired on October 6, 2002.

Both Yodels and RingDings were frequently mentioned on the sitcom The King of Queens as favorites of main character Doug Heffernan; Devil Dogs were also mentioned in the episode "Roamin' Holiday [S2E10]".
