= 53rd Primetime Emmy Awards =

2001 American television programming awards

- Date: November 4, 2001 (Ceremony); September 8, 2001 (Creative Arts Awards)
- Location: Shubert Theatre, Los Angeles, California, U.S. (ceremony); Shrine Auditorium, Los Angeles, California, U.S. (Creative Arts Awards)
- Presented by: Academy of Television Arts and Sciences
- Hosted by: Ellen DeGeneres

Highlights
- Most awards: The West Wing (4)
- Most nominations: The Sopranos (14)
- Outstanding Comedy Series: Sex and the City
- Outstanding Drama Series: The West Wing
- Outstanding Miniseries: Anne Frank: The Whole Story
- Outstanding Variety, Music or Comedy Series: Late Show with David Letterman
- Website: http://www.emmys.com/

Television/radio coverage
- Network: CBS
- Produced by: Gary Smith

The 53rd Primetime Emmy Awards were held on Sunday, November 4, 2001, seven weeks later than originally scheduled. The ceremony was rescheduled twice from its original date of September 16 at the Shrine Auditorium because of the September 11th attacks that occurred five days prior to the event. It was also removed from its rescheduled date of October 7 again at the same venue as a result of the start of the War in Afghanistan. The event was then relocated to the smaller Shubert Theater, which had previously hosted the 1973 and 1976 ceremonies, and would be demolished in 2002. The ceremony was hosted by Ellen DeGeneres and was broadcast on CBS. 27 awards were presented.

Barbra Streisand sang "You'll Never Walk Alone" in a surprise appearance at the close, in honor of the victims of the attacks.

Sex and the City became the first premium channel show to win Outstanding Comedy Series; this was its only major award. The NBC cult hit Freaks and Geeks accomplished a rare feat: though it only ran for one season, it was nominated in two different years for writing. Frasier, now in its eighth season, earned its final Outstanding Comedy Series nomination after eight consecutive nominations including five consecutive wins (seasons 1–5).

The episode "Bowling" made Malcolm in the Middle just the second show, and first comedy, to have two different episodes win awards for directing and writing. The Defenders was the first show to do this in 1963 and 1965. (Specific episodes were not nominated in the comedy categories until the late 1960s). Game of Thrones would also achieve this in 2015 and 2016.

For his portrayal of John Cage in Ally McBeal, Peter MacNicol won Outstanding Supporting Actor in a Comedy Series, the first in this category for Fox and the first in this category for any show outside the Big Three television networks.

In the drama field, The West Wing won Outstanding Drama Series for its second straight year and led all shows with four major awards on the night. The Sopranos led all shows with 14 major nominations and was second to The West Wing with three major wins.

Mike Nichols' win made him the ninth person to become an EGOT winner.

== Rescheduling ==
The ceremony was originally scheduled to be held on September 16, 2001 at the Shrine Auditorium in Los Angeles.

On September 11, just hours following the September 11th attacks, CBS announced the event would be postponed indefinitely, but were hopeful it would take place September 23.

On September 15, CBS and officials from the Academy of Television Arts & Sciences (ATAS) announced they had chosen a new date of October 7, with the venue remaining unchanged.

On October 1, CBS and ATAS announced that a scaled down ceremony would take place in both Los Angeles and New York. The majority of the night's 30 awards given would still be given at the Shrine Auditorium in Los Angeles, but some would be given at a simultaneous event in studio 6A at NBC Studios (New York) where Late Night with Conan O'Brien was normally filmed. According to then-executive producer Don Mischer, this was to accommodate nominees who were reluctant to fly to Los Angeles so soon after the attacks.

On October 7 at 12:30 p.m. (PST), only hours before the ceremony's 5 p.m. scheduled commencement, CBS and ATAS announced that the ceremony was cancelled due to the start of the War in Afghanistan earlier in the day.

On October 9, ATAS officials and CBS execs announced their intention to reschedule the ceremony, but that it would not take place at the Shrine Auditorium.

On October 16, representatives from CBS and ATAS announced that the ceremony would now be held on November 4 at the Shubert Theater in Los Angeles, a smaller venue, and that the simultaneous event in New York would no longer be taking place.

On November 4, the awards ceremony was held at the Shubert Theater in Los Angeles. To ensure security, sharpshooters were placed rooftops, attendees passed through metal detectors, nearby businesses were closed, and the Shubert complex's two lowest underground parking levels were blocked off due to the risk of car bombs.

The awards took place simultaneously with Game 7 of the 2001 World Series. During that game, the broadcast flashed updates across the bottom of the screen, informing viewers about who had won various Emmy Awards.

== Winners and nominees ==
Winners are listed first, highlighted in boldface, and indicated with a double dagger (‡). (Note: The outlets listed for each program are the U.S. broadcasters or streaming services identified in the nominations, which for some international productions are different from the broadcaster(s) that originally commissioned the program.) For simplicity, producers who received nominations for program awards, as well as nominated writers for Outstanding Writing for a Variety or Music Program, have been omitted.

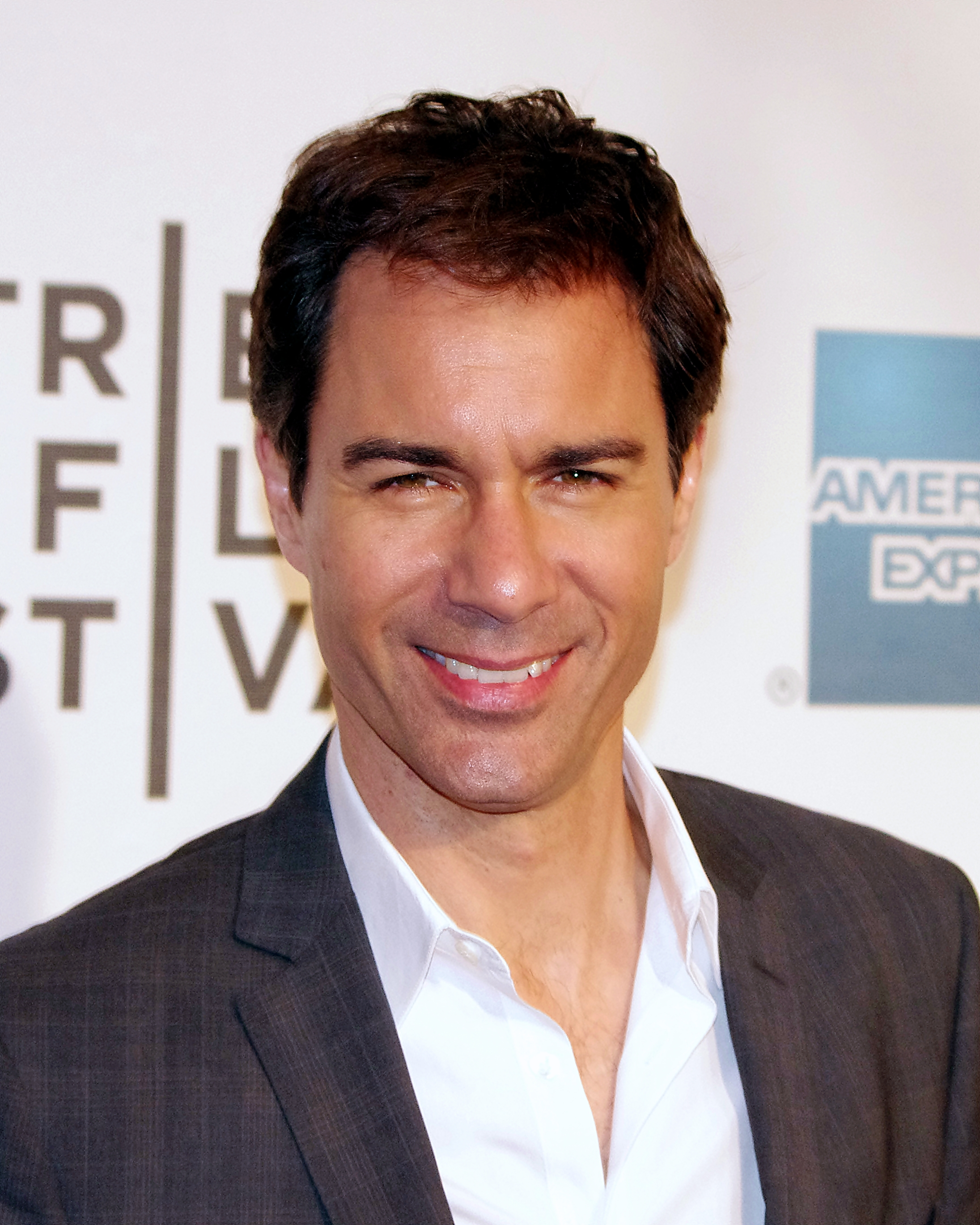
Eric McCormack, Outstanding Lead Actor in a Comedy Series winner

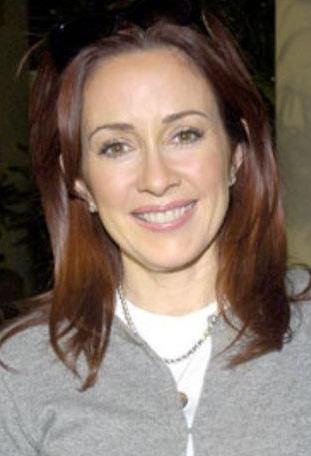
Patricia Heaton, Outstanding Lead Actress in a Comedy Series winner

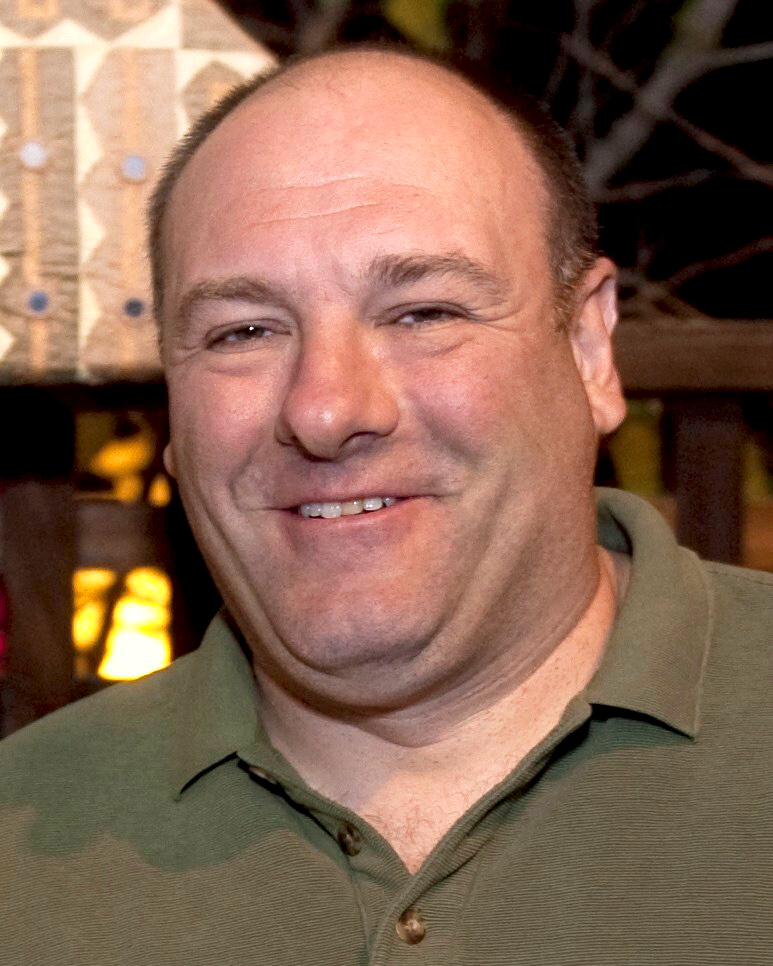
James Gandolfini, Outstanding Lead Actor in a Drama Series winner

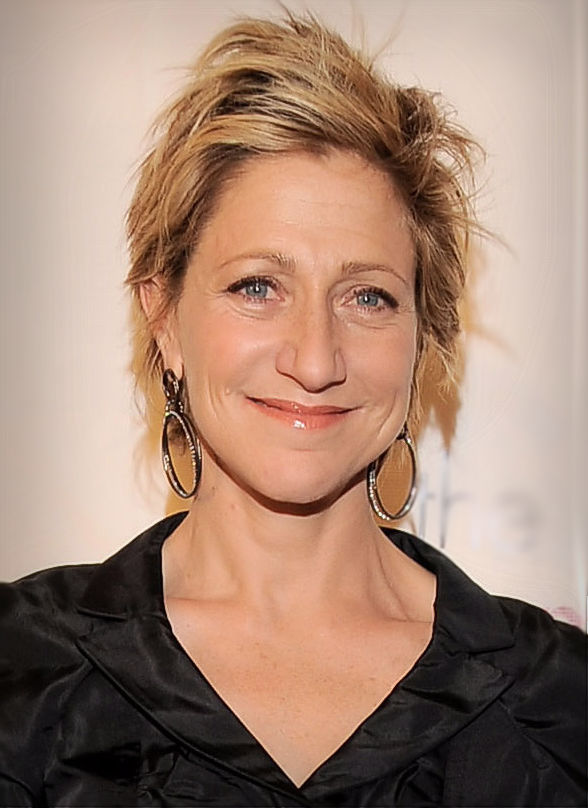
Edie Falco, Outstanding Lead Actress in a Drama Series winner

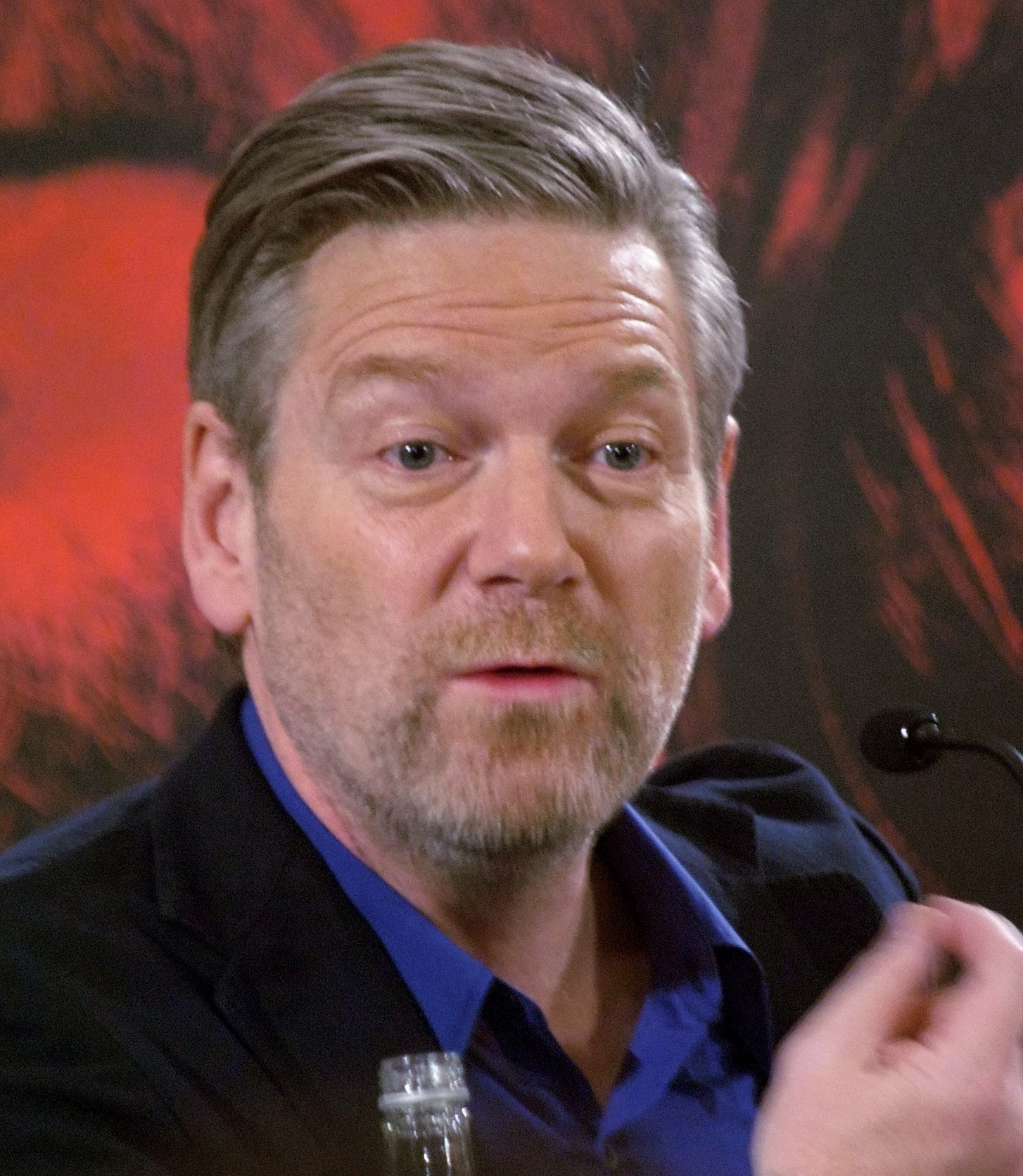
Kenneth Branagh, Outstanding Lead Actor in a Miniseries or Movie winner

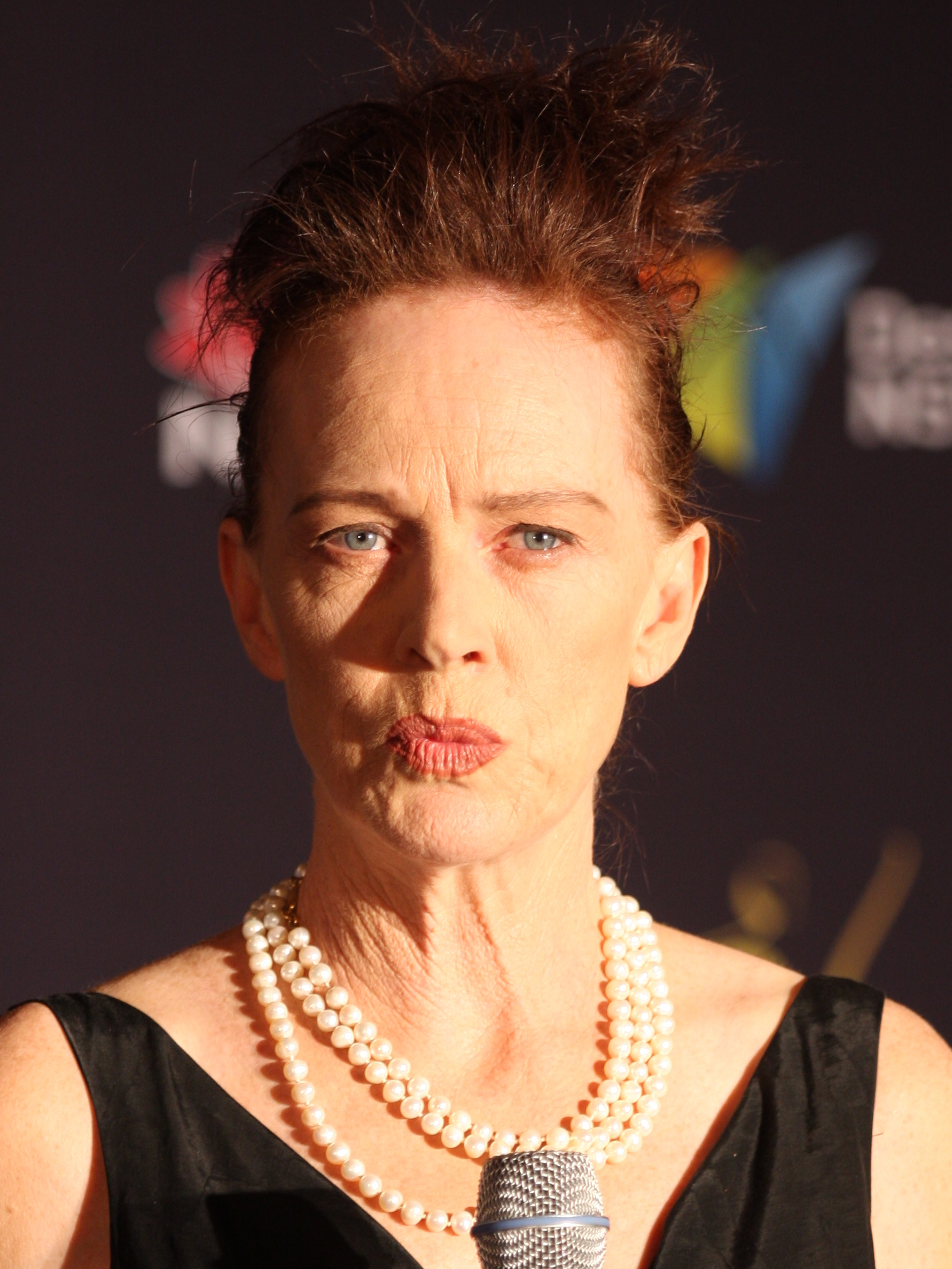
Judy Davis, Outstanding Lead Actress in a Miniseries or Movie winner

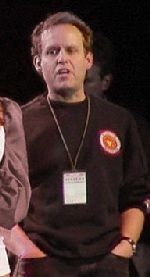
Peter MacNicol, Outstanding Supporting Actor in a Comedy Series winner

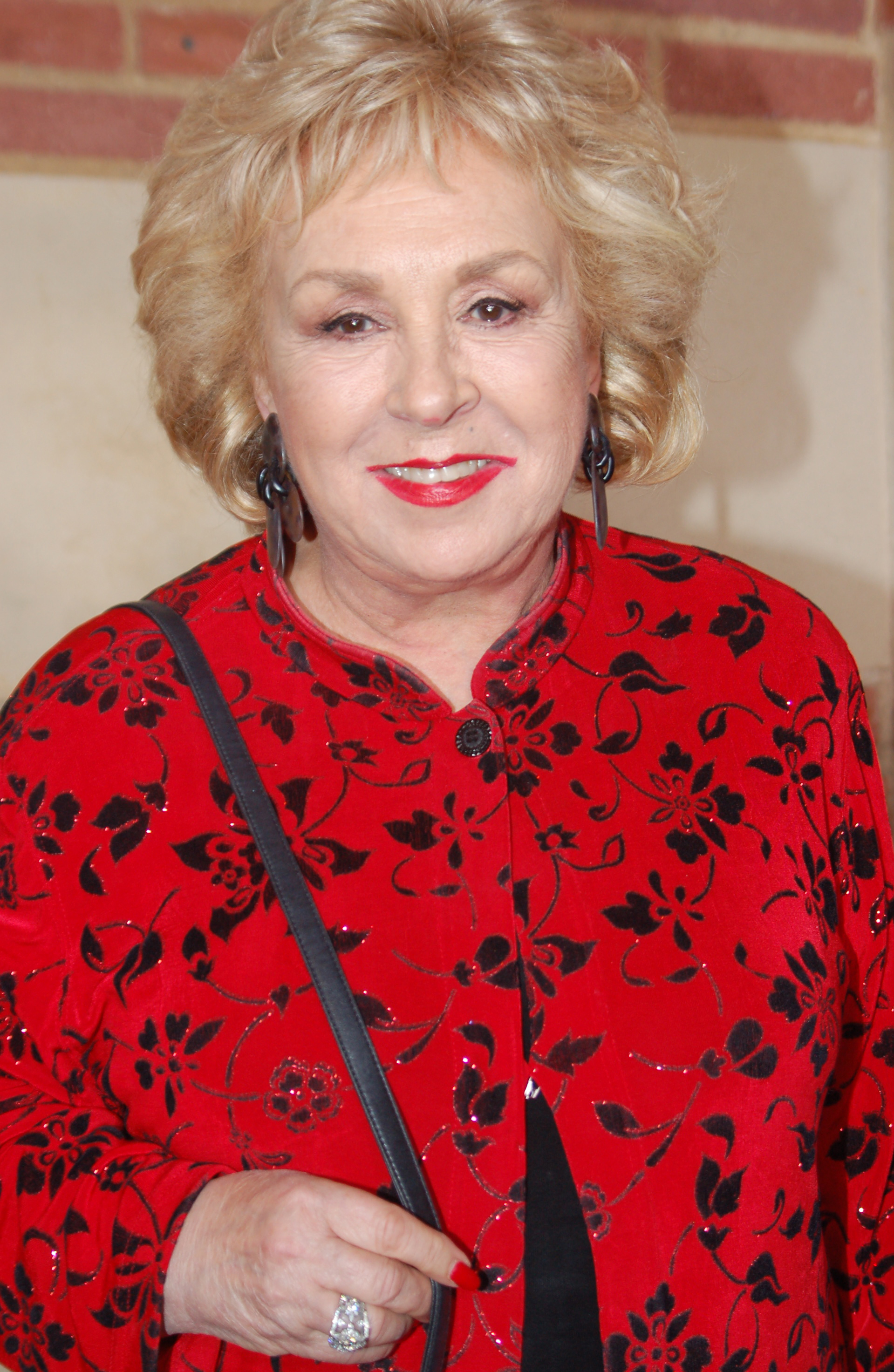
Doris Roberts, Outstanding Supporting Actress in a Comedy Series winner

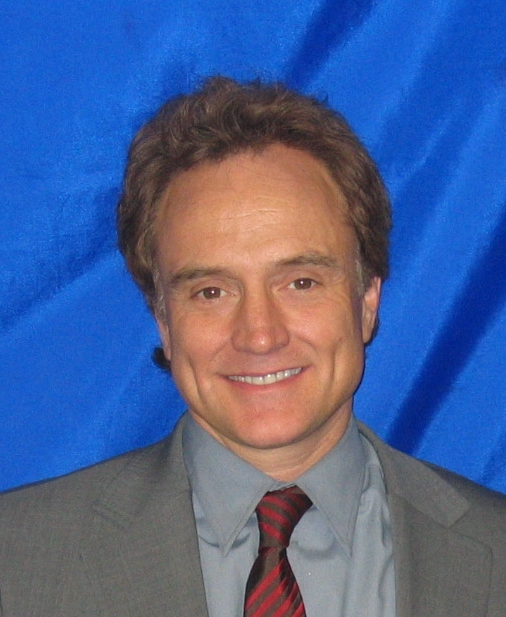
Bradley Whitford, Outstanding Supporting Actor in a Drama Series winner

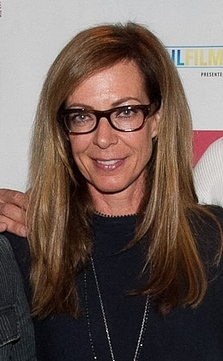
Allison Janney, Outstanding Supporting Actress in a Drama Series winner

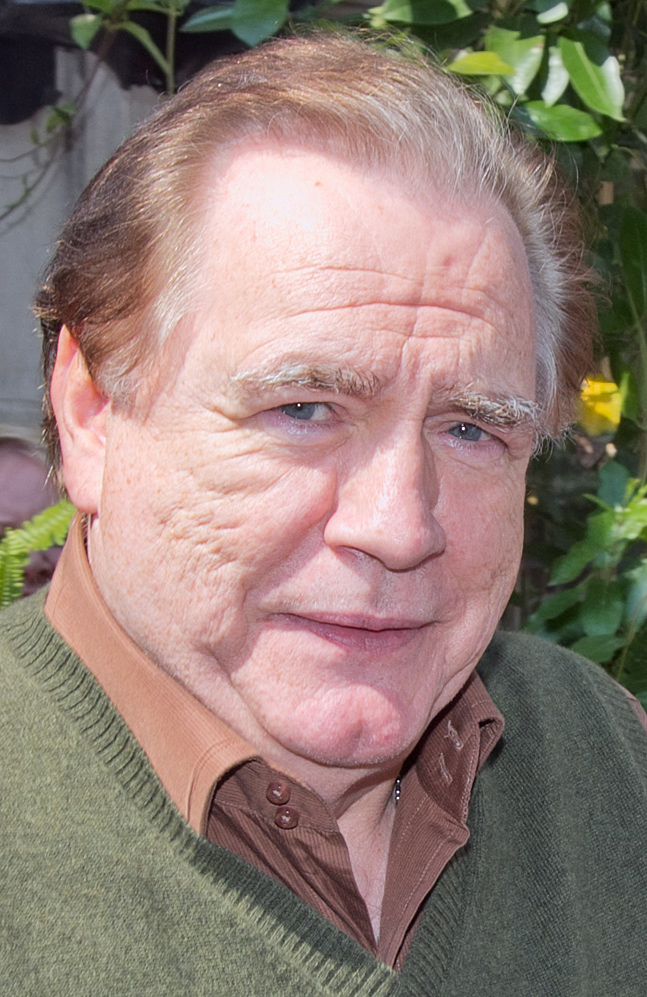
Brian Cox, Outstanding Supporting Actor in a Miniseries or Movie winner

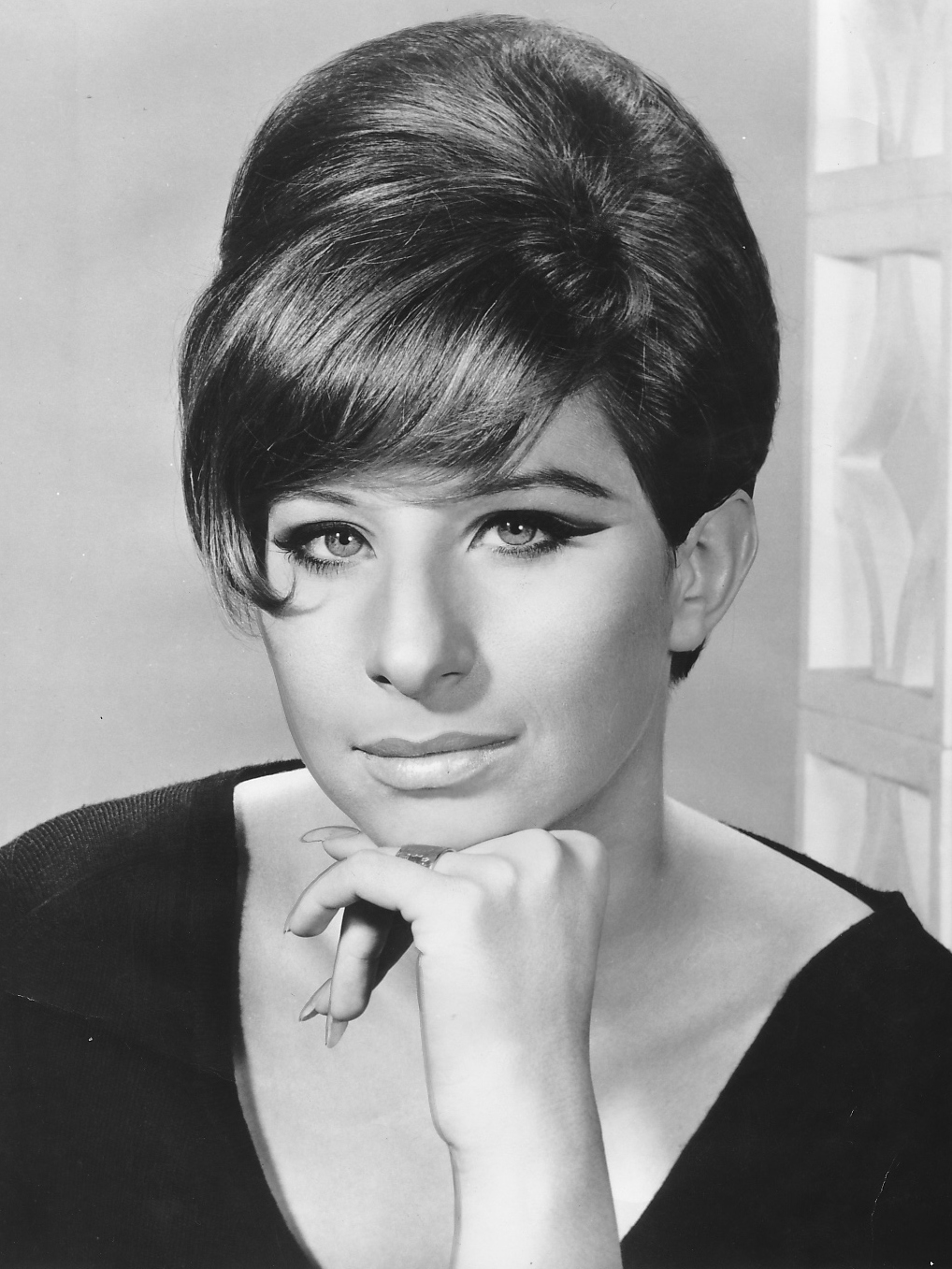
Barbra Streisand, Outstanding Individual Performance in a Variety or Music Program winner

=== Programs ===
Programs
**Outstanding Comedy Series**: **Sex and the City (HBO)**‡; Everybody Loves Raymond (CBS); Frasier (NBC); Malcolm in the Middle (Fox); Will & Grace (NBC)	**Outstanding Drama Series**: **The West Wing (NBC)**‡; ER (NBC); Law & Order (NBC); The Practice (ABC); The Sopranos (HBO)
**Outstanding Variety, Music or Comedy Series**: **Late Show with David Letterman (CBS)**‡; The Chris Rock Show (HBO); The Daily Show with Jon Stewart (Comedy Central); Politically Incorrect with Bill Maher (ABC); Saturday Night Live (NBC)	**Outstanding Variety, Music or Comedy Special**: **Cirque du Soleil's Dralion (Bravo)**‡; 73rd Annual Academy Awards (ABC); Bruce Springsteen & The E Street Band (HBO); Ellen DeGeneres: The Beginning (HBO); Saturday Night Live's Presidential Bash 2000 (NBC)
**Outstanding Made for Television Movie**: **Wit (HBO)**‡; 61* (HBO); Conspiracy (HBO); For Love or Country: The Arturo Sandoval Story (HBO); Neil Simon's Laughter on the 23rd Floor (Showtime)	**Outstanding Miniseries**: **Anne Frank (ABC)**‡; Armistead Maupin's Further Tales of the City (Showtime); Horatio Hornblower (A&E); Life with Judy Garland: Me and My Shadows (ABC); Nuremberg (TNT)

=== Acting ===
==== Lead performances ====
Lead performances
**Outstanding Lead Actor in a Comedy Series**: **Eric McCormack – Will & Grace as Will Truman (NBC)**‡; Kelsey Grammer – Frasier as Dr. Frasier Crane (NBC); John Lithgow – 3rd Rock from the Sun as Dick Solomon (NBC); Frankie Muniz – Malcolm in the Middle as Malcolm (Fox) (Episode: “Bowling”); Ray Romano – Everybody Loves Raymond as Raymond Barone (CBS) (Episode: “Ray's Journal”)	**Outstanding Lead Actress in a Comedy Series**: **Patricia Heaton – Everybody Loves Raymond as Debra Barone (CBS) (Episode: “The Canister”)** ‡; Calista Flockhart – Ally McBeal as Ally McBeal (Fox); Jane Kaczmarek – Malcolm in the Middle as Lois (Fox) (Episode: “Flashback”); Debra Messing – Will & Grace as Grace Adler (NBC); Sarah Jessica Parker – Sex and the City as Carrie Bradshaw (HBO)
**Outstanding Lead Actor in a Drama Series**: **James Gandolfini – The Sopranos as Tony Soprano (HBO)**‡; Andre Braugher – Gideon's Crossing as Dr. Ben Gideon (ABC); Dennis Franz – NYPD Blue as Andy Sipowicz (ABC); Rob Lowe – The West Wing as Sam Seaborn (NBC); Martin Sheen – The West Wing as President Josiah Bartlet (NBC)	**Outstanding Lead Actress in a Drama Series**: **Edie Falco – The Sopranos as Carmela Soprano (HBO)**‡; Lorraine Bracco – The Sopranos as Dr. Jennifer Melfi (HBO); Amy Brenneman – Judging Amy as Judge Amy Madison Gray (CBS); Marg Helgenberger – CSI: Crime Scene Investigation as Catherine Willows (CBS); Sela Ward – Once and Again as Lily Manning (ABC)
**Outstanding Lead Actor in a Miniseries or Movie**: **Kenneth Branagh – Conspiracy as Reinhard Heydrich (HBO)**‡; Andy García – For Love or Country: The Arturo Sandoval Story as Arturo Sandoval (HBO); Gregory Hines – Bojangles as Bill "Bojangles" Robinson (Showtime); Ben Kingsley – Anne Frank as Otto Frank (ABC); Barry Pepper – 61* as Roger Maris (HBO)	**Outstanding Lead Actress in a Miniseries or Movie**: **Judy Davis – Life with Judy Garland: Me and My Shadows as Judy Garland (ABC)**‡; Judi Dench – The Last of the Blonde Bombshells as Elizabeth (HBO); Hannah Taylor-Gordon – Anne Frank as Anne Frank (ABC); Holly Hunter – When Billie Beat Bobby as Billie Jean King (ABC); Emma Thompson – Wit as Vivian Bearing (HBO)
**Outstanding Individual Performance in a Variety or Music Program**: **Barbra Streisand – Barbra Streisand: Timeless (Fox)**‡; Wayne Brady – Whose Line Is It Anyway? (ABC); Ellen DeGeneres – Ellen DeGeneres: The Beginning (HBO); Will Ferrell – Saturday Night Live: "Host: Alec Baldwin" (NBC); David Letterman – Late Show with David Letterman: "#1596" (CBS); Steve Martin – 73rd Annual Academy Awards (ABC)

==== Supporting performances ====
Supporting performances
**Outstanding Supporting Actor in a Comedy Series**: **Peter MacNicol – Ally McBeal as John Cage (Fox)**‡; Peter Boyle – Everybody Loves Raymond as Frank Barone (CBS) (Episodes: “Wallpaper” and “Frank Paints The House”); Robert Downey Jr. – Ally McBeal as Larry Paul (Fox); Sean Hayes – Will & Grace as Jack McFarland (NBC); David Hyde Pierce – Frasier as Niles Crane (NBC)	**Outstanding Supporting Actress in a Comedy Series**: **Doris Roberts – Everybody Loves Raymond as Marie Barone (CBS) (Episode: “Ray's Journal”)** ‡; Jennifer Aniston – Friends as Rachel Green (NBC); Kim Cattrall – Sex and the City as Samantha Jones (HBO); Lisa Kudrow – Friends as Phoebe Buffay (NBC); Megan Mullally – Will & Grace as Karen Walker (NBC)
**Outstanding Supporting Actor in a Drama Series**: **Bradley Whitford – The West Wing as Josh Lyman (NBC)**‡; Dominic Chianese – The Sopranos as Corrado "Uncle Junior" Soprano (HBO); Michael Imperioli – The Sopranos as Christopher Moltisanti (HBO); Richard Schiff – The West Wing as Toby Ziegler (NBC); John Spencer – The West Wing as Leo McGarry (NBC)	**Outstanding Supporting Actress in a Drama Series**: **Allison Janney – The West Wing as C. J. Cregg (NBC)**‡; Stockard Channing – The West Wing as Dr. Abigail Bartlet (NBC); Tyne Daly – Judging Amy as Maxine Gray (CBS); Maura Tierney – ER as Abby Lockhart (NBC); Aida Turturro – The Sopranos as Janice Soprano (HBO)
**Outstanding Supporting Actor in a Miniseries or Movie**: **Brian Cox – Nuremberg as Hermann Wilhelm Göring (TNT)**‡; Alan Alda – Club Land as Willie Walters (Showtime); Colin Firth – Conspiracy as Stuckart (HBO); Victor Garber – Life with Judy Garland: Me and My Shadows as Sid Luft (ABC); Ian Holm – The Last of the Blonde Bombshells as Patrick (HBO); Stanley Tucci – Conspiracy as Eichmann (HBO)	**Outstanding Supporting Actress in a Miniseries or Movie**: **Tammy Blanchard – Life with Judy Garland: Me and My Shadows as Young Judy Garland (ABC)**‡; Anne Bancroft – Haven as Mama Gruber (CBS); Brenda Blethyn – Anne Frank as Auguste Van Pels (ABC); Holly Hunter – Things You Can Tell Just by Looking at Her as Rebecca (Showtime); Audra McDonald – Wit as Susie Monahan (HBO)

=== Directing ===
Directing
**Outstanding Directing for a Comedy Series**: **Malcolm in the Middle: "Bowling" – Todd Holland (Fox)**‡; Ed: "Pilot" – James Frawley (NBC); Malcolm in the Middle: "Flashback" – Jeff Melman (Fox); Sex and the City: "Easy Come, Easy Go" – Charles McDougall (HBO); Will & Grace: "Lows in the Mid-Eighties" – James Burrows (NBC)	**Outstanding Directing for a Drama Series**: **The West Wing: "In the Shadow of Two Gunmen, Parts I and II" – Thomas Schlamme (NBC)**‡; ER: "The Visit" – Jonathan Kaplan (NBC); The Sopranos: "Amour Fou" – Tim Van Patten (HBO); The Sopranos: "Pine Barrens" – Steve Buscemi (HBO); The Sopranos: "University" – Allen Coulter (HBO); The West Wing: "Shibboleth" – Laura Innes (NBC)
**Outstanding Directing for a Variety or Music Program**: **Cirque du Soleil's Dralion – David Mallet (Bravo)**‡; 73rd Annual Academy Awards – Louis J. Horvitz (ABC); Bruce Springsteen & The E Street Band – Chris Hilson (HBO); Late Show with David Letterman: "#1527" – Jerry Foley (CBS); The Tony Awards – Paul Miller (CBS)	**Outstanding Directing for a Miniseries or Movie**: **Wit – Mike Nichols (HBO)**‡; 61* – Billy Crystal (HBO); Anne Frank – Robert Dornhelm (ABC); Conspiracy – Frank Pierson (HBO); Life with Judy Garland: Me and My Shadows – Robert Allan Ackerman (ABC)

=== Writing ===
Writing
**Outstanding Writing for a Comedy Series**: **Malcolm in the Middle: "Bowling" – Alex Reid (Fox)**‡; Ed: "Pilot" – Rob Burnett and Jon Beckerman (NBC); Freaks and Geeks: "Discos and Dragons" – Paul Feig (NBC); Sex and the City: "Easy Come, Easy Go" – Michael Patrick King (HBO); Will & Grace: "Lows in the Mid-Eighties" – Jeff Greenstein (NBC)	**Outstanding Writing for a Drama Series**: **The Sopranos: "Employee of the Month" – Robin Green and Mitchell Burgess (HBO)**‡; The Sopranos: "Amour Fou" – Frank Renzulli and David Chase (HBO); The Sopranos: "Pine Barrens" – Terence Winter and Tim Van Patten (HBO); The Sopranos: "Second Opinion" – Lawrence Konner (HBO); The West Wing: "In the Shadow of Two Gunmen, Parts I and II" – Aaron Sorkin (NBC)
**Outstanding Writing for a Variety or Music Program**: **The Daily Show with Jon Stewart (Comedy Central)**‡; The Chris Rock Show (HBO); Late Night with Conan O'Brien (NBC); Late Show with David Letterman (CBS); Saturday Night Live (NBC)	**Outstanding Writing for a Miniseries or Movie**: **Conspiracy – Loring Mandel (HBO)**‡; 61* – Hank Steinberg (HBO); Anne Frank – Kirk Ellis (ABC); Life with Judy Garland: Me and My Shadows – Robert L. Freedman (ABC); Wit – Emma Thompson and Mike Nichols (HBO)

== Most major nominations ==
Networks with multiple major nominations (Note: "Major" constitutes the categories listed above: Program, Acting, Directing, and Writing. Does not include the technical categories.)
Network	No. of Nominations
HBO	44
NBC	43
ABC	24
CBS	15
Fox	13

Programs with multiple major nominations
Program	Category	Network	No. of Nominations
The Sopranos	Drama	HBO	14
The West Wing	Drama	NBC	11
Will & Grace	Comedy	NBC	7
Anne Frank: The Whole Story	Miniseries	ABC	6
Conspiracy	Movie	HBO	6
Life with Judy Garland: Me and My Shadows	Miniseries	ABC	6
Malcolm in the Middle	Comedy	Fox	6
Everybody Loves Raymond	Comedy	CBS	5
Sex and the City	Comedy	HBO	5
Wit	Movie	HBO	5
61*	Movie	HBO	4
Late Show with David Letterman	Variety	CBS	4
The 73rd Annual Academy Awards	Variety	ABC	3
Ally McBeal	Comedy	Fox	3
ER	Drama	NBC	3
Frasier	Comedy	NBC	3
Saturday Night Live	Variety	NBC	3
Bruce Springsteen & The E Street Band	Variety	HBO	2
The Chris Rock Show	Variety	HBO	2
Cirque du Soleil's Dralion	Variety	Bravo	2
The Daily Show with Jon Stewart	Variety	Comedy Central	2
Ed	Comedy	NBC	2
Ellen DeGeneres: The Beginning	Variety	HBO	2
For Love or Country: The Arturo Sandoval Story	Movie	HBO	2
Friends	Comedy	NBC	2
Judging Amy	Drama	CBS	2
The Last of the Blonde Bombshells	Movie	HBO	2
Nuremberg	Miniseries	TNT	2

== Most major awards ==
Networks with multiple major awards
Network	No. of Awards
HBO	8
NBC	5
Fox	4
ABC	3
CBS	3
Bravo	2

Programs with multiple major awards
Program	Category	Network	No. of Awards
The West Wing	Drama	NBC	4
The Sopranos	Drama	HBO	3
Cirque du Soleil's Dralion	Variety	Bravo	2
Conspiracy	Movie	HBO	2
Everybody Loves Raymond	Comedy	CBS	2
Life with Judy Garland: Me and My Shadows	Miniseries	ABC	2
Malcolm in the Middle	Comedy	Fox	2
Wit	Movie	HBO	2

== Presenters ==
The awards were presented by the following people:

Presenter(s)	Role(s)
Dennis Franz	Presented the awards for Outstanding Supporting Actress in a Drama Series and Outstanding Directing for a Drama Series
Marg Helgenberger; William Petersen	Presented the award for Outstanding Supporting Actor in a Drama Series
Sally Field; Michael Emerson	Presented the award for Outstanding Writing for a Drama Series
Martin Short	Presented the award for Outstanding Supporting Actor in a Comedy Series
Kelsey Grammer	Presented the award for Outstanding Directing for a Comedy Series
Frankie Muniz	Presented the award for Outstanding Supporting Actress in a Comedy Series
Jean Smart	Presented the award for Outstanding Writing for a Comedy Series
Wayne Brady	Presented the award for Outstanding Writing for a Variety, Music or Comedy Program
Jessica Alba; Jennifer Garner	Presented the award for Outstanding Directing for a Variety or Music Program
Debra Messing; Eric McCormack	Presented the awards for Outstanding Individual Performance in a Variety or Music Program and Outstanding Supporting Actor in a Miniseries or Movie
Amy Brenneman	Presented the award for Outstanding Directing for a Miniseries, Movie or Special
Andy Garcia	Presented the award for Outstanding Supporting Actress in a Miniseries or Movie
Kevin James; Leah Remini; Jerry Stiller	Presented the award for Outstanding Variety, Music or Comedy Special
Ray Romano; Patricia Heaton	Presented the award for Outstanding Variety, Music or Comedy Series
Jane Kaczmarek; Bradley Whitford	Presented the award for Outstanding Writing for a Miniseries or Movie
Calista Flockhart	Presented the award for Outstanding Lead Actor in a Miniseries or Movie
Andre Braugher	Presented the award for Outstanding Miniseries
Lorraine Bracco; Edie Falco	Presented the award for Outstanding Made for Television Movie
Martin Sheen	Presented the award for Outstanding Lead Actress in a Miniseries or Movie
Kim Cattrall; Kristin Davis	Presented the award for Outstanding Lead Actor in a Comedy Series
Mary Tyler Moore	Presented the award for Outstanding Lead Actress in a Comedy Series
Jimmy Smits	Presented the award for Outstanding Lead Actor in a Drama Series
Simon Baker	Presented the award for Outstanding Lead Actress in a Drama Series
Tim Conway	Presented the award for Outstanding Comedy Series
Angela Bassett	Presented the award for Outstanding Drama Series

== In Memoriam ==
Before the segment began, Rob Reiner briefly paid tribute to his All in the Family co-star Carroll O' Connor. Throughout the segment, it showed the victims of the September 11th attacks, in which Barbara Olson, Berry Berenson, and David Angell were honored.

- Carroll O'Connor
- Jack Elliott
- Richard Mulligan
- William Hanna
- Robert Trout
- Perry Como
- Rosemary DeCamp
- Alan Rafkin
- John Cannon
- Werner Klemperer
- Dale Evans
- Arlene Francis
- Stan Margulies
- Beah Richards
- Fred de Cordova
- Ann Sothern
- Ray Walston
- Imogene Coca
- Victor Borge
- Jack Haley Jr.
- Jason Robards
- Kathleen Freeman
- Jack Lemmon
- Steve Allen
- Barbara Olson
- Berry Berenson
- David Angell
