= Everybody Loves Raymond season 4 =

Everybody Loves Raymond
- Season 4
- DVD cover
- Starring: Ray Romano; Patricia Heaton; Brad Garrett; Madylin Sweeten; Doris Roberts; Peter Boyle
- No. of episodes: 24

Release
- Original network: CBS
- Original release: September 20, 1999 – May 22, 2000

Season chronology
- ← Previous; Season 3 Next → Season 5

The fourth season of Everybody Loves Raymond aired on CBS from September 20, 1999, to May 22, 2000.

== Production ==
The fourth season of Everybody Loves Raymond was produced by HBO Independent Productions, creator Philip Rosenthal's company Where's Lunch, and David Letterman's Worldwide Pants. The episode "Marie and Frank's New Friends" was the final appearance of character actor David Byrd, who died at the age of 68 on February 2, 2001 due to cancer. Starting in the season, episodes of Everybody Loves Raymond were produced in high definition.

== Cast ==
=== Main ===
- Ray Romano as Raymond "Ray" Barone
- Patricia Heaton as Debra (née Whelan) Barone
- Brad Garrett as Robert Barone
- Doris Roberts as Marie Barone
- Peter Boyle as Francis "Frank" Barone
- Madylin Sweeten as Alexandra "Ally" Barone
- Sawyer Sweeten as Geoffrey Barone
- Sullivan Sweeten as Michael Barone

=== Supporting ===
- Monica Horan as Amy McDougall
- Andy Kindler as Andy
- Jon Manfrellotti as Gianni
- Tom McGowan as Bernie Gruenfelder
- Maggie Wheeler as Linda Gruenfelder
- Katherine Helmond as Lois Whelan
- Robert Culp as Warren Whelan
- Sherri Shepherd as Judy
- Victor Raider-Wexler as Stan
- Len Lesser as Garvin
- Charles Durning as Father Hubley
- Fred Stoller as Gerard
- Suzie Plakson as Joanne Glotz
- Ashley Crow as Jennifer Whelan
- David Hunt as Bill Parker
- David Byrd as Harry Stipe

== Reception ==
=== Reviews ===
During the 1999–2000 TV season, some critics claimed Everybody Loves Raymond to be one of the greatest sitcoms in an otherwise terrible season for the genre. Bruce Fretts of Entertainment Weekly, ranking Raymond the second-best series of 1999, claimed the cast "returned to full strength" in the season, and "no show has ever deserved its better-late-than-never ratings success more." Mitchell J. Near of Lawrence Journal-World called Marie and Frank "the best TV parents (from Hell)" of the 1999–2000 TV season, while Contra Costa Times ranked Raymond the second best show of the season. It was also on TV Guide's list of the best shows of 1999. Upon each episode's initial airing, Mike Hughes, a TV critic for Gannett News Service, included "Boob Job," "Sex Talk," "The Will," "Cousin Gerard," "Debra's Workout," "No Fat," "Left Back," "What's with Robert?," "Debra Makes Something Good," and "Confronting the Attacker" in his weekly feature of "Tonight's Must-See" programs. He called "Left Back" "a terrific episode, even by this show's high standards." Hal Boedeker gave a positive review of the season finale, labeling it "far more impressive than most ballyhooed sweeps programs." As he elaborated about the episode, "[Suzie] Plakson gives a memorably chilly performance, and the episode even manages a surprising cliffhanger."

=== Awards ===
==== Emmys ====
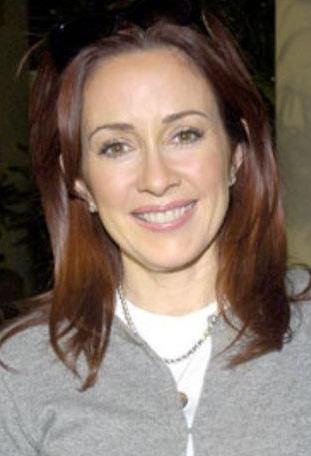
Patricia Heaton gave the show its first Primetime Emmy Award win.

On May 24, 2000, a truck of 9,600 videotapes, each containing four segments from season four of Raymond, was stolen from a North Hollywood parking lot; they were meant for voters of the Emmy Awards, and the robbery occurred a week before content submission to the Emmys was due. The tapes had been dubbed only hours before by a Technicolor company in Camarillo, California. Although this resulted in a delay, as HBO and Worldwide Pants had to re-produce the tapes, Rosenthal responded that he had no worries about Raymond not gaining Emmy nominations as a result. On June 21, the truck was spotted by a driver in a location five minutes away from the parking lot; 9,100 of the tapes were found in the truck, and CBS donated them to hospitals and nursing homes.

Everybody Loves Raymond's fourth season received nine Primetime Emmy Award nominations, including one Outstanding Comedy Series accolade for the season itself. Rosenthal and Romano were also nominated for Outstanding Writing for a Comedy Series for writing "Bad Moon Rising," Will MacKenzie was nominated for Outstanding Directing for a Comedy Series for his work on "The Christmas Picture," and Mike Berlin was nominated for Outstanding Cinematography for a Multi-Camera Series for "Robert's Rodeo."

Five acting award nominations were for the lead performers. Romano was nominated for Outstanding Lead Actor in a Comedy Series; Heaton was nominated for Outstanding Lead Actress in a Comedy Series; Roberts was nominated for Outstanding Supporting Actress in a Comedy Series; and Garrett and Boyle were both nominated for Outstanding Supporting Actor in a Comedy Series. In the end, Heaton won the Lead Actress award, giving Everybody Loves Raymond its first-ever Emmy win. Analyzed Rosenthal, the public airing of Heaton's September 10, 2000 winning increased the popularity of Raymond's cast, which was a prominent factor of "Italy," an episode that aired a month later, garnering 22 million viewers, a record for the show.

==== Other ====
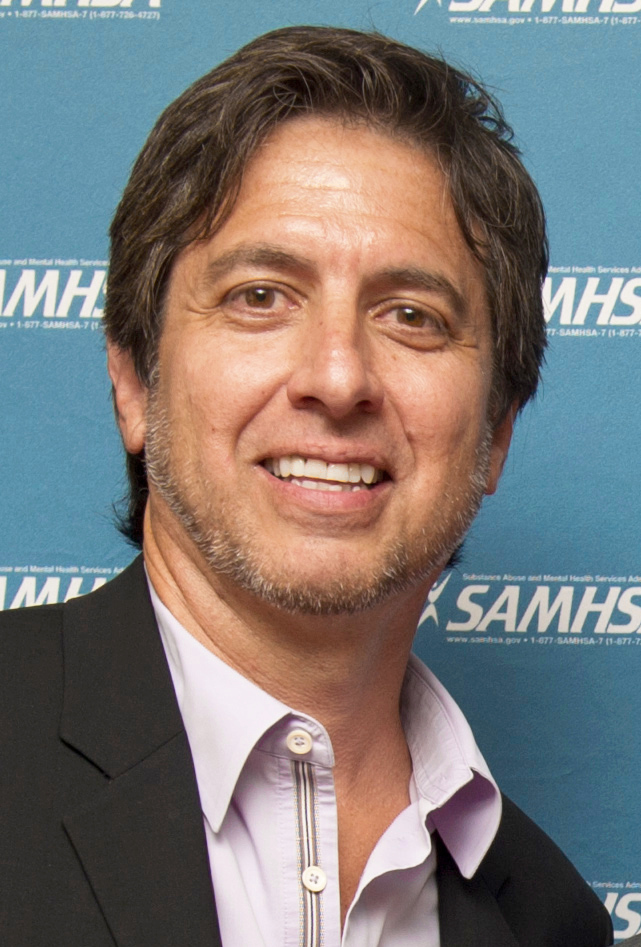
Ray Romano was responsible for the show's only two Golden Globe Award nominations it ever received, one of them for acting in the fourth season.

For acting in the season, Romano was nominated for a Golden Globe Award for Best Actor in a Television Series Musical or Comedy; it was the first of only two nominations the series received throughout its nine-year run, as Romano would be nominated for the same award a year later. In what was Viewers for Quality Television's last Q award ceremony, the season was nominated for five awards, such as Best Supporting Actor in a Quality Comedy Series for Garrett, and won four: Best Quality Comedy Series, Best Actress in a Quality Comedy Series for Heaton, Best Actor in a Quality Comedy Series for Romano, and Best Supporting Actress in a Quality Comedy Series for Roberts.

At the 16th TCA Awards, the season was nominated for Outstanding Achievement in Comedy, and Romano was nominated for Individual Achievement in Comedy. In regards to the fourth Online Film & Television Association TV Awards ceremony, Romano won Best Actor in a Comedy Series, Heaton was nominated for Best Actress in a Comedy Series, Boyle was nominated for Best Supporting Actor in a Comedy Series, the leads were nominated for Best Ensemble in a Comedy Series, and the season received a nomination for Best Comedy Series. The season garnered another Comedy Series Ensemble nomination at the sixth Screen Actors Guild Awards, an event where Romano was also nominated for Outstanding Performance by a Male Actor in a Comedy Series.

At the 2000 American Comedy Awards, Romano won Funniest Leading Male Performer in a TV Series, other nominations including Funniest Supporting Male Performer in a TV Series for Boyle, Funniest Supporting Female Performer in a TV Series for Roberts, and Funniest Television Series for the season. As an ASCAP composer, Rick Marotta received a Top Television Series award from the company's Film and Television Music Awards for his music on the latter half of season three and the first half of season four. The season also won Best Comedy Series awards from the American Cinema Foundation as an E Pluribus Unum award, the TV Guide Awards, and the Association of National Advertisers' Family Television Awards.

== Episodes ==
No. overall	No. in season	Title	Directed by	Written by	Original release date	Prod. code	U.S. viewers (millions)
74	1	"Boob Job"	Will Mackenzie	Lew Schneider	September 20, 1999	9901	18.39
After a PTA meeting Debra makes a comment about a mother who had a "boob job", to which Ray responds enthusiastically, upsetting Debra. When Ray returns home from a trip, an enhanced Debra surprises him. Robert, Marie and Frank are also shocked. After getting Ray to admit that he likes Debra better this way, she reveals that she just stuffed a pair of socks in her bra to trick him.
75	2	"The Can Opener"	Will Mackenzie	Aaron Shure & Susan Van Allen	September 27, 1999	9903	18.17
To fix his own dinner, Ray tries to open a tin of tuna with a new can opener Debra has bought. He spills tuna water and blames the can opener. This incident is shared by Debra and Ray with Robert and Marie respectively, but their viewpoints are radically different.
76	3	"You Bet"	Will Mackenzie	Ellen Sandler & Steve Skrovan	October 4, 1999	9902	15.76
After an accidental tip-off from Ray which allows him to win a bet, Frank hangs out a lot with Ray to get more insider information. The sudden generosity and affection creates a lot of suspicion. When the truth comes out, Ray is disappointed and sets up Frank to teach him a lesson.
77	4	"Sex Talk"	Will Mackenzie	Tod Himmel & Lisa K. Nelson	October 11, 1999	9904	17.72
Marie sees Debra reading a book to help her talk to Ally about sex. Marie then reveals that her and Frank's sex life has been almost dead for the past 20 years. Debra is shocked and tries to spice up her own sex life. When the guys talk about it, Frank mentions that his sex life is very healthy. Finally Debra and Ray confront Marie and Frank and realize that Marie was lying.
78	5	"The Will"	Will Mackenzie	Story by : Michael Feldman and Jennifer Crittenden; Teleplay by : Jennifer Crittenden	October 18, 1999	9905	16.73
Upon drafting their wills, Ray and Debra must decide who would make the best guardians for their children. They choose Bernie and Linda, which offends the family. During dinner, when Debra and Ray try to ask Bernie and Linda, the family interrupts and makes them uncomfortable. Bernie and Linda refuse the offer because of their crazy family and Debra and Ray are forced to choose Marie and Frank.
79	6	"The Sister"	Will Mackenzie	Kathy Ann Stumpe	October 25, 1999	9906	17.29
Debra's sister Jennifer drops in for a visit. She announces that she is leaving her pot-smoking hippie nudist lifestyle to become a nun. The attitude of the entire family suddenly changes and Debra gets very upset.
80	7	"Cousin Gerard"	Will Mackenzie	Jason Gelles & Mike Haukom	November 8, 1999	9907	16.15
Ray's cousin Gerard (Fred Stoller) tries to help him write a book, but ends up annoying the entire family. When Debra points out that Gerard is very similar to Ray, he tries to change Gerard.
81	8	"Debra's Workout"	Will Mackenzie	Tom Caltabiano & Ray Romano & Mike Royce	November 15, 1999	9908	16.94
Ray gets suspicious when Debra has more sex with him than she normally does. He discovers that her good mood is coinciding with her aerobics class, which is taught by a very handsome man. He goes to the class to investigate some more.
82	9	"No Thanks"	Will Mackenzie	Tucker Cawley & Jeremy Stevens	November 22, 1999	9909	17.37
Inspired by how well the Barones get along at a Thanksgiving dinner, Debra is intent on finding a way to improve her relationship with Marie. She tries to be extra nice and laughs at herself, but Marie finds it sarcastic and asks her to be honest about her feelings.
83	10	"Left Back"	Will Mackenzie	Philip Rosenthal	November 29, 1999	9910	17.72
While discussing the possibility of having to hold Michael back for another year of pre-school, Ray is shocked to discover that he too was left back at that age. The twins perform a comedy act in school.
84	11	"The Christmas Picture"	Will Mackenzie	Lew Schneider	December 13, 1999	9911	18.52
Ray decides to get a family picture taken for Marie's Christmas gift, which Debra doesn't like much. When she suggests spending Christmas Eve with her parents, Marie acts disappointed and Ray does not support her. To avenge this, she invites her parents into the family picture without informing Ray. This angers Marie and the whole picture is ruined.
85	12	"What's with Robert?"	Will Mackenzie	Cindy Chupack	January 10, 2000	9912	20.79
The family talks about how Robert is unable to keep a girlfriend and decide that he must be gay. Robert is shocked, Frank blames Marie for being smothering and Marie is too supportive. Robert starts doubting his own sexuality, but later decides that he is not gay after talking to Ray.
86	13	"Bully on the Bus"	Will Mackenzie	Tucker Cawley	January 17, 2000	9913	19.01
Ally says she is being bullied on the bus, and Ray is very concerned. Debra wants Ally to deal with it on her own, but Ray's family interferes. Ray rides on the bus with her and discovers that Ally is actually the bully, and the boy whom she complained about was actually defending the little girl that Ally was bullying. Debra and Ray then have a talk with her, and Ally promises to be good.
87	14	"Prodigal Son"	Will Mackenzie	Steve Skrovan	January 31, 2000	9914	18.53
Ray does not want to go to church, and his entire family is disappointed. When Ally makes a picture of him in hell, because of skipping church, he decides to start going to the church regularly to make his father happy. He then realizes that his dad is an usher who never really sits through the mass.
88	15	"Robert's Rodeo"	Will Mackenzie	Jennifer Crittenden	February 7, 2000	9915	16.15
In order to go Go-Carting with friends, Ray lies to Robert about having to work. Robert decides to work an extra shift with the police and gets gored by a bull while trying to shut down an illegal rodeo. Because of his injury he has to move back in with his parents. The guilt drives Ray to confess to Robert and help him with the bandages.
89	16	"The Tenth Anniversary"	Will Mackenzie	Aaron Shure	February 14, 2000	9916	17.74
On their 10th wedding anniversary, Debra wants to watch her wedding video and discovers that Ray has taped a football game over it. When Ray is unsuccessful in getting a copy, he decides to have a vows renewal ceremony and tape that for her. Debra wants Ray to arrange it, but Marie wants to help. In the ceremony, Ray forgets to write his new vows and also to tape the ceremony, but he remembers her favorite flower, Lily of the Valley.
90	17	"Hackidu"	Will Mackenzie	Lew Schneider & Steve Skrovan	February 21, 2000	9917	17.92
In a spoof of the Pokémon craze, Ally makes a Hackidu card trade (all of her cards for one Scramisaur card) which Ray does not agree with. He reverses the trade, only to find out that the Scramisaur card that Ally was getting is actually a very rare and an expensive one. Ally is devastated and to make it right, Ray tries to buy her a Scramisaur from Amy's eccentric brother (guest star Paul Reubens).
91	18	"Debra Makes Something Good"	Will Mackenzie	Kathy Ann Stumpe	February 28, 2000	9918	17.53
Debra makes braciole, which Ray finds delicious. In spite of that he makes fun of it at work and Debra gets mad and dumps sauce all over his pants. Robert and Frank also love it and keep coming over to eat it. This makes Marie jealous and she confronts Debra.
92	19	"Marie and Frank's New Friends"	Steve Zuckerman	Mike Royce	March 20, 2000	9919	18.39
To get rid of Marie and Frank, Ray and Debra try to find them new friends, the Stipes, Robert's former landlords. After dinner at Marie's they come over to meet Ray and interrupt a romantic moment. Ray initially tries to get rid of them, but starts entertaining when they show a lot of interest in him. When they visit again with their son, Debra wants to get out. The Stipes drop-in before they can escape, but Ray stays back. After many attempts to get him out, she finally gets annoyed and leaves alone.
93	20	"Alone Time"	Steve Zuckerman	Jennifer Crittenden	April 17, 2000	9920	17.69
When Ray barges in on Debra while she is bleaching her upper lip, she demands for some alone time. So Ray takes the kids to his parents' place to leave her alone. Curious about the alone time, Ray spies on her and catches her crying. He thinks that she is very sad with him and tries to talk to her. She explains that she likes to cry to let some of her emotions out. Later Ray tries the same, but ends up dancing to Lady Marmalade by Labelle.
94	21	"Someone's Cranky"	Steve Zuckerman	Tucker Cawley	May 1, 2000	9921	17.13
Still recuperating from his recent run-in with a bull, a cantankerous Robert is driving everyone crazy with his mean-spirited and nasty behavior. When he insults Debra on a birthday gift, she gets angry with him. Confronting him about his anger she discovers some deeper issues he has with his parents.
95	22	"Bad Moon Rising"	David Lee	Ray Romano & Philip Rosenthal	May 8, 2000	9922	17.12
Debra has PMS. Trying to find a cure for her irritable and over-emotional behavior, Ray gets her some medicine. She denies that her behavior is not normal, and refuses to take the drugs. Ray tapes one of her rants to show her how mean she has been lately. Confronted with this, Debra gets abusive, hitting Ray and insulting him. She eventually explains that the answer to PMS is not medicine, it is compassion.
96	23	"Confronting the Attacker"	Brian K. Roberts	Lew Schneider & Kathy Ann Stumpe	May 15, 2000	9923	16.72
Robert and Amy get back together. After losing his nerve on the job during his first day back from medical leave, Robert decides to quit the police force and take up a telemarketing job. Ray takes him to a petting zoo to face his fear: the bull that hurt him. Finding the bull to be docile now that it is in a non-stressful environment, he talks to the bull and comes to terms with it. He then decides to go back to his job.
97	24	"Robert's Divorce"	Wil Shriner	Tucker Cawley & Jennifer Crittenden & Steve Skrovan	May 22, 2000	9924	18.52
While eating out, the Barones see Robert's ex-wife, Joanne, dining at another table, leading Ray to tell Amy the story of what led to Robert's divorce five years ago. In the flashback, Robert's wife Joanne is very mean to Robert and also to Debra and Ray when they visit their house. When Robert stands up to her asks her to behave, she asks for a divorce. Marie walks in at that time and, upon learning of Joanne's treatment of Robert, throws her out of the house. After the flashback, Joanne comes over to the table and hands Robert her business card. He initially throws it away, but later takes it, indicating that he may be considering getting back with her.
