= Newman E. Drake =

American entrepreneur and philanthropist who founded Drake's

Newman E. Drake (December 16, 1860 – March 17, 1930) was an American entrepreneur and philanthropist who founded Drake's, an American baking company now owned by McKee Foods.

== Biography ==
=== Early life ===
Newman E. Drake was born in Andover, New Jersey, on December 16, 1860. Newman was the eldest child of John B. Drake (1835–1916), a carpenter who later worked as a mechanic for the Sussex Railroad Company, and his wife Mary Elizabeth Stackhouse (1840–1908).

=== Drake's Cakes ===
In 1888, Drake established his company in Brooklyn as Drake Brothers, with a commercial bakery located at 1006 Wallabout Market in Brooklyn. The company's "Drake’s Cakes" sold pound cake by the slice. As the company expanded, it was renamed Drake Bakeries, Inc., and built a factory facility at 77 Clinton Avenue on the border of the Fort Greene and Clinton Hill neighborhoods of Brooklyn. Drake Bakeries was one of the few snack cake companies to be produced under kosher guidelines, not using lard or tallow which are prohibited under kosher food laws.

In the 1960s, the Drake's brand—which involved familiar products including Ring Dings, Yodels, Devil Dogs, Yankee Doodles, Sunny Doodles, Funny Bones, and its trademark round coffee cake—was purchased by large food manufacturing companies. It was first owned by Borden until 1987 when it was sold to Ralston Purina, and operations were overseen by Ralston Purina's ITT Continental Baking Company. In 1991, it was sold to Culinar, and later Interstate Bakeries Corporation which acquired Hostess Brands and Wonder Bread. Hostess filed for bankruptcy liquidation in 2012 and shuttered its plants. On January 28, 2013, McKee Foods of Chattanooga, Tennessee (makers of Little Debbie snack cakes) was the lead bidder for the Drake's brand and equipment.

=== Death and burial ===
Newman Drake died at Lenox Hill Hospital in New York City's Upper East Side on March 17, 1930. His wife, Elizabeth Drake, died October 29, 1940. Both were interred at a private family mausoleum in Tranquility Cemetery in the Tranquility section of Green Township, New Jersey.

=== Philanthropy to Newton, New Jersey ===
On September 5, 1928, Drake purchased 10.84 acres (4.39 ha) of meadowland on the north side of Newton, which in November he and his wife donated as “a playground and general recreation field under direction of the Town of Newton.” Newton accepted the donation and in 1929 appointed a Board of Recreation Commissioners, including Drake as president, to transform this tract into a public park.
