= Wallpaper (Everybody Loves Raymond) =

- Everybody Loves Raymond episode
- Marie and Frank crash into Ray and Debra's house
- Episode no.: Season 5 Episode 3
- Directed by: Gary Halvorson
- Written by: Lew Schneider
- Cinematography by: Mike Berlin
- Editing by: Patricia Barnett
- Production code: 0003
- Original air date: October 9, 2000
- Running time: 22 minutes

Episode chronology
← Previous "Italy: Part Two"	Next → "Meant to Be"
- Everybody Loves Raymond (season 5)

"Wallpaper" is the third episode of the fifth season of the American sitcom Everybody Loves Raymond (1996–2005). The episode aired on October 9, 2000 on CBS.

== Plot ==
Ray and Debra reminisce about their trip to Italy, (Note: Portrayed in "Italy") then decide to go upstairs. Right then, Frank and Marie crash their car into the house. Marie, who drove the car, explains that she constantly put her foot on the brakes, but as a result of Frank's failure to get it repaired, they did not work. Debra is upset about her house having been ruined, and she insists that Frank pays for the damage. However, Ray is unsupportive.

Later, the house is repaired, and Ray and Debra kiss in celebration. However, Ray soon notices that the new wallpaper doesn't exactly match the old paper. When Frank and Marie return to check out the new wallpaper, Debra, at Ray's instruction, tells Frank that he will have to pay more to correct the paper. When Frank refuses, Ray releases all his built-up frustrations toward his parents and orders them out. However, Debra stops them from leaving and asks Ray to tell his parents in a nice manner why he's really upset.

Ray calmly tells his parents he is upset with them constantly barging in and overstaying their welcome, then wrecking his house, and that the wallpaper was the last straw. Frank and Marie then tell Ray that he should not yell. Debra agrees, though she tells Frank and Marie they need to be more considerate of their son, which they agree to do.

== Reception ==
According to Screen Rant, "Wallpaper" is an iconic episode of the series for Marie's car crash, and "a premise involving a car smashing through the wall of our lead characters almost writes itself in terms of funny banter." In a review of season five, DVDTalk highlighted "Wallpaper" as one of the season's many "fun episodes." For acting in "Wallpaper" and "Frank Paints the House," Boyle was nominated for a Primetime Emmy Award for Outstanding Supporting Actor in a Comedy Series. "Wallpaper" was number four in a March 2005 online viewers poll ran by CBS of top Raymond episodes. As of October 2019, the 8.5-rated "Wallpaper," "Raybert," and "The Bird" were close to being the tenth highest-rated Everybody Loves Raymond episode on IMDb, but the first part of "Italy" was beaten for having more votes. However, by December 2019, it was highest-rated episode to be primarily about Frank.
