= Wallabout Market =

Market in Brooklyn, New York

Coordinates: 40°42′0″N 73°58′1″W

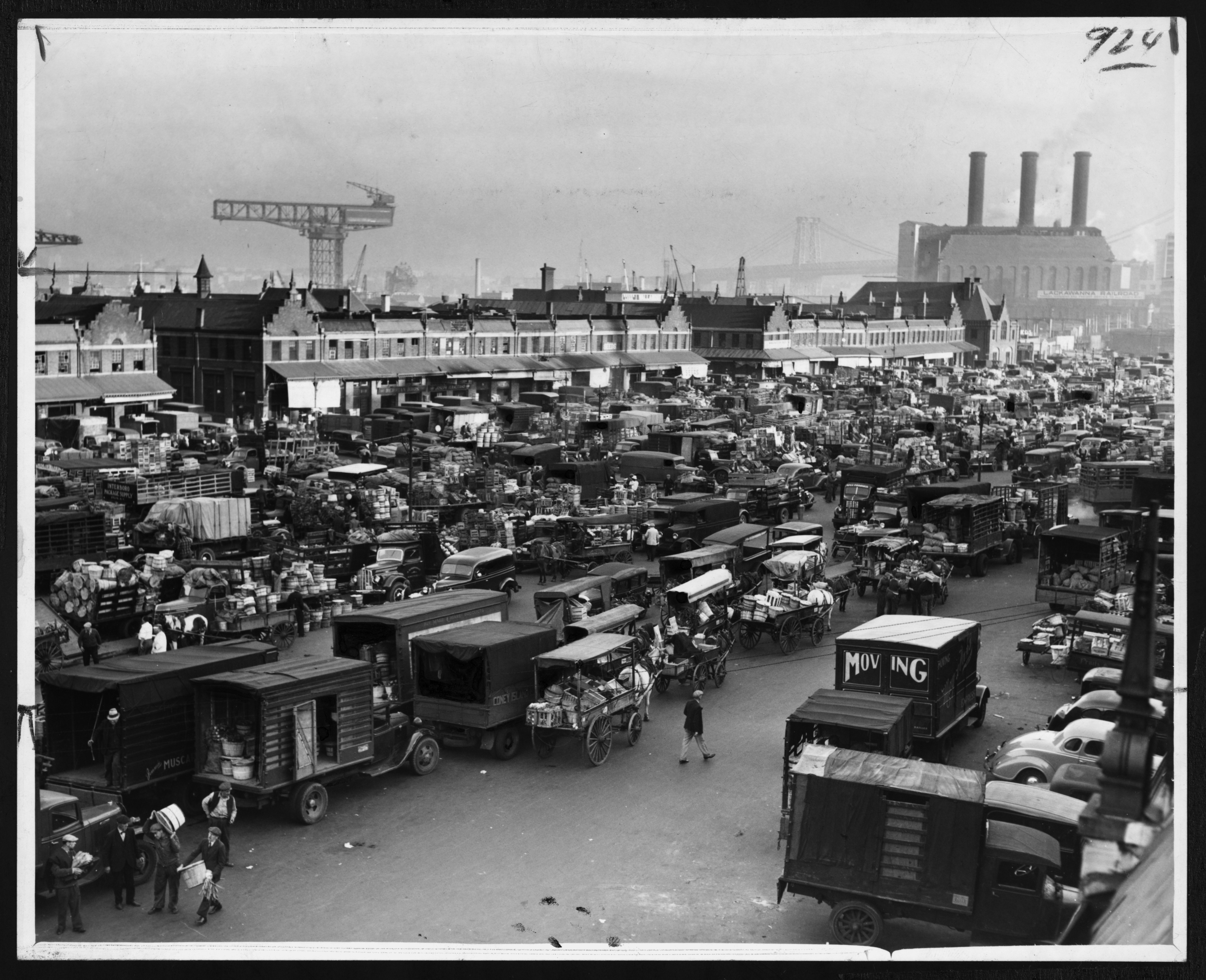
Wallabout Market in 1940

Wallabout Market was the second largest market located at Wallabout Bay in Brooklyn, New York City.

== History ==
Wallabout gained its name from the French-speaking Walloons of Belgium who were the first settlers on the bay in 1624. The bay was a good location for ferries across the east river to New Amsterdam. By 1884, a wholesale produce, meat and provisions market was in place in Wallabout. While originally in 1884 there was a few wooden stalls for vendors, as the market continued to grow the city of Brooklyn decided they would build a new market with great architectural design.

The halls were constructed in the Dutch Colonial Revival architecture by the architect William Tubby in 1894-1896. The Market was a host to produce, meat, dairy, fish and other food vendors in addition to grocery stores, restaurants and wholesalers. The market is said to have been beautiful compared to other competing markets.

They were demolished during World War II for the expansion of the Brooklyn Navy Yard.
