= Robert's Rodeo =

- Everybody Loves Raymond episode
- Episode no.: Season 4 Episode 15
- Directed by: Will Mackenzie
- Written by: Jennifer Crittenden
- Cinematography by: Mike Berlin
- Editing by: Patricia Barnett
- Production code: 9915
- Original air date: February 7, 2000
- Running time: 22 minutes

Guest appearances
- Andy Kindler as Andy; Jon Manfrellotti as Gianni

Episode chronology
← Previous "Prodigal Son"	Next → "The Tenth Anniversary"
- Everybody Loves Raymond (season 4)

"Robert's Rodeo" is the 15th episode of the fourth season of the American sitcom Everybody Loves Raymond (1996–2005). The episode aired on February 7, 2000 on CBS.

== Synopsis ==
Ray is excited after being invited to go go-kart racing with some friends, however in his excitement he forgets that he had made plans with Robert for the same time to watch football. When Robert arrives, Ray makes up an excuse that he has to work on Saturday. That evening, as Ray and Debra prepare to sleep Frank bursts in and says that Robert has been injured while working and is in the hospital. The worried family immediately head to the hospital.

Arriving, while the rest of the family show their concern for Robert, Ray instead makes jokes to try and keep the atmosphere light. Robert explains that he and his partner were sent to shut down an illegal rodeo when one of the bulls got loose and chased him before goring him through his buttock. Ray finds this funny and makes more jokes, which Debra admonishes him for (noting that for once Frank isn't being the most insensitive person in the room). Ray's mood quickly turns however when he learns that Robert wasn't meant to be working but picked up an extra shift when Ray cancelled their plans to watch football. He also learns that while Robert recovers he will have to move back in with Marie and Frank.

Ray feels extremely guilty over being the indirect cause of Robert's injury, and visits Robert in the hospital with gifts as well as Robert's ex-girlfriend Amy, with her brief visit being awkward for everyone involved. After Amy has left, Ray confesses to Robert he didn't have to work but had made plans with someone else and then lied about it. Robert is upset, knowing that Ray is only confessing to make himself feel better, and refuses to accept the apology and hides under the bedsheet so he doesn't have to look at him.

When Ray tells Debra what happened, Debra tells Ray he has to go and visit Robert again and make sure his brother knows how much he cares. Ray visits Robert, who is now back with his parents and living in Ray's old bedroom, and tries to open up to him and offers to do anything to make up for his mistake, but is put out when Robert needs his bandage changing. Ray initially refuses but then feels guilty again and agrees, and while uneasily doing so is shocked to see the extent of Robert's injury. After changing the bandage successfully, Robert thanks Ray and the two reconcile by making jokes about what happened. The episode ends with the two watching TV, although they are shocked when footage of Robert being chased by the bull ends up on the local news.

== Reception ==
As Screen Rant stated when placing "Robert's Rodeo" number seven on its list of the best Robert episodes of Everybody Loves Raymond, "While this wacky scenario makes Robert the 'butt' of quite a few jokes, it's also somewhat endearing, as it shows Ray's willingness to go out of his way to help his brother out and be there for him while stuck in the hospital." DVDTalk, reviewing the show's fourth season, praised the arc started by "Robert's Rodeo," which "sets up some great situations and jokes for the season." For his work on "Robert's Rodeo," Mike Berlin was nominated for Outstanding Cinematography for a Multi-Camera Series. Upon the end of Everybody Loves Raymond in 2005, Garrett claimed "Robert's Rodeo" to be one of his favorites of the entire series.
