= Everybody Loves Raymond season 5 =

Everybody Loves Raymond
- Season 5
- DVD cover
- Starring: Ray Romano; Patricia Heaton; Brad Garrett; Madylin Sweeten; Doris Roberts; Peter Boyle
- No. of episodes: 25

Release
- Original network: CBS
- Original release: October 2, 2000 – May 21, 2001

Season chronology
- ← Previous; Season 4 Next → Season 6

This is a list of episodes for the fifth season of Everybody Loves Raymond. The season consisted of 25 episodes and aired on CBS from October 2, 2000, to May 21, 2001.

== Cast ==
=== Main ===
- Ray Romano as Raymond "Ray" Barone
- Patricia Heaton as Debra (née Whelan) Barone
- Brad Garrett as Robert Barone
- Doris Roberts as Marie Barone
- Peter Boyle as Francis "Frank" Barone
- Madylin Sweeten as Alexandra "Ally" Barone
- Sawyer Sweeten and Sullivan Sweeten as Geoffrey Barone and Michael Barone

=== Recurring ===
- Monica Horan as Amy McDougall
- Andy Kindler as Andy
- Jon Manfrellotti as Gianni
- Katherine Helmond as Lois Whelan
- Robert Culp as Warren Whelan
- Sherri Shepherd as Judy
- Alex Meneses as Stefania Fogagnolo
- David Proval as Marco Fogagnolo
- Suzie Plakson as Joanne Glotz

== Ratings ==
Everybody Loves Raymond's fifth season tied with Friends and Monday Night Football for the fifth most-viewed program of the 2000–01 television season, far higher that the previous year's #13 ranking for the 1999–2000 season; this was an incredibly unusual boost for an established show, with Marc Berman of Mediaweek stating that "I don't think I've seen such an improvement since Cheers." The season premiere garnered 22 million viewers, which was a record for the show. Rosenthal attributed the sudden increase in viewership to Survivor giving attention to Raymond's summer re-airings and Heaton's win of Outstanding Lead Actress in a Comedy Series at the 52nd Primetime Emmy Awards. Some of the season's episodes beat Monday Night Football airings in viewership. From November 2001 to the next month, viewership for the series grew 20%.

== Reviews ==
However, the season also received coverage for having zero female or minority directors involved, due to a January 2002 Directors Guild of America study showing an extreme amount of white males directing major network drama and comedy series (663 of 826 episodes).

== Awards ==
The fifth season on Everybody Loves Raymond won three Primetime Emmy Awards. Heaton won Outstanding Lead Actress in a Comedy Series for a second year in a row, and Roberts received Outstanding Supporting Actress in a Comedy Series. Brentley Walton, Doug Gray, Anthony Constantini, and Rick Himot won Outstanding Multi-Camera Sound Mixing for a Series or a Special for their work on "Italy," an episode that also gave nominations to Mike Berlin and Alessio Gelsini Torresi for Outstanding Cinematography for a Multi-Camera Series and Patricia Barnett for Outstanding Multi-Camera Picture Editing for a Comedy Series. The fifth season's other Emmy nominations included Outstanding Comedy Series, Outstanding Lead Actor in a Comedy Series for Romano, and Outstanding Supporting Actor in a Comedy Series for Boyle.

The season won an American Comedy Award for Funniest Television Series, Romano nominated for Funniest Male Performer in a TV Series (Leading Role). He was also nominated for a Golden Globe Award for Best Actor in a Television Series Musical or Comedy, the last of only two nominations the series received throughout its nine-year run; he was nominated for the same award the previous year. The season obtained three wins at the 2001 TV Guide Award, including Favorite Comedy Series, Actor of the Year in a Comedy Series for Romano, and Supporting Actress of the Year in a Comedy Series for Roberts. At the same event, Heaton was nominated for Actress of the Year in a Comedy Series, and Garrett was nominated for Supporting Actor of the Year in a Comedy Series.

At the 17th TCA Awards, the season was nominated for Outstanding Achievement in Comedy, and Romano was nominated for Individual Achievement in Comedy. The season was also nominated for a Family TV Comedy Series Young Artist Award, with Sweeten nominated for Best Performance in a TV Series (Comedy or Drama): Young Actress Age Ten or Under. As an ASCAP composer, Rick Marotta received a Top Television Series award from the company's Film and Television Music Awards for his music on the latter half of season four and the first half of season five. For writing "Ray's Journal," Jennifer Crittenden won a Humanitas Prize in the 30-minute show category.

== Episodes ==
No. overall	No. in season	Title	Directed by	Written by	Original release date	Prod. code	U.S. viewers (millions)
98	1	"Italy"	Gary Halvorson	Philip Rosenthal	October 2, 2000	0001	22.01
99	2	"Italy"	Gary Halvorson	Philip Rosenthal	October 2, 2000	0002	22.01
Marie has saved up some money and takes the whole family on a trip to Italy, where they stay with Marie's relatives. Marie, Debra, Frank and Ray follow the holiday plan made by Marie. Raymond is not enjoying himself because he has caught a cold from the airplane's air conditioning, and as a result he's always complaining and pessimistic, while Debra is constantly nagging him to get with the program and have a good time. Robert meets Stefania at an Italian Ice stand and is instantly smitten, experiencing what Frank calls "The Thunderbolt". He courts her during the entire trip, although Stefania's father does not approve. Finally Ray's cold clears up, and he manages to get some time away from Debra and finally starts to enjoy the trip. Ray gets romantic with Debra, giving her flowers, taking her for a bicycle ride around the island and, unfortunately, injuring her several times in his clumsy excitement about Italian life. When it comes time for Robert to say goodbye to Stefania, he tells her she can visit him in America sometime.
100	3	"Wallpaper"	Gary Halvorson	Lew Schneider	October 9, 2000	0003	19.92
Marie drives Frank's car backwards through Ray's front door, crushing the house. Debra is mad and insists that Frank pay to repair everything that was damaged, but Ray is not very supportive. When the new wallpaper doesn't exactly match the old paper, Ray releases all the pent-up frustrations and finally yells at his parents.
101	4	"Meant to Be"	Michael Zinberg	Jennifer Crittenden & Kathy Ann Stumpe	October 16, 2000	0004	21.26
Robert has been seeing his ex-wife Joanne, so now with her, Amy and Stefania, three women are interested in Robert. Ray and Frank tell him he has to choose. He decides that he and Amy are "meant to be" and tells her the same at dinner. To start an honest relationship, he confesses about Joanne. Amy gets mad and leaves. Back at home, she complains to Debra and Debra accidentally blurts out about Robert's relationship with Stefania. Amy breaks up with Robert and leaves. Robert then tries to patch-up with Joanne, but she is not interested in a serious relationship. They break-up too. He tries calling Amy to make up, but she repeatedly hangs up on him. In desperation he calls Stefania in Italy, but her father tells him to drop dead.
102	5	"Pet Cemetery"	Ken Levine	Steve Skrovan	October 23, 2000	0005	19.64
Ally's hamster, Pumpernickel, passes away due to Ray's carelessness (he accidentally placed the hamster in the ice-cream box, freezing him to death). Ray tries to fool Ally and replace him with a new hamster, but Ally quickly finds out the truth, and she is not interested in a new hamster. On Debra's suggestion, the family holds a funeral for Pumpernickel to cheer Ally up.
103	6	"The Author"	Andy Ackerman	Mike Royce	October 30, 2000	0006	20.23
Ray's dreams of writing a sports book get squashed when the publishing company takes a pass on it, just when Robert is promoted to lieutenant, which places the family into the dilemma about cheering Robert or comforting Ray. The brothers discuss their need for winning the never-ending competition between them, and getting in a fight.
104	7	"The Walk to the Door"	Asaad Kelada	Tucker Cawley	November 6, 2000	0007	20.57
When Ray learns that he will be seeing an old girlfriend, Elizabeth, at a wedding, he confesses to the family that he regrets that after their first date 25 years ago he did not walk her to her door. During the wedding reception he meets her and apologizes to her. She replies that she doesn't even remember the incident and laughs at the thought that he might have been waiting 25 years to tell her. In an effort to irritate Ray, Debra orders him to describe one regret he has in his relationship with her. At a loss, he steals one from Robert, but gets caught. Debra tells Ray that sometimes she regrets marrying him, but not all the time. Marie confesses that she set up the date Ray had with Elizabeth, and Ray realizes that it was a pity date, and that he was a pathetic loser back then.
105	8	"Young Girl"	Michael Zinberg	Tom Caltabiano & Aaron Shure	November 13, 2000	0009	20.52
Robert dates a 22-year-old girl named Erica. Ray and Frank are excited to meet her, but Debra and Marie are annoyed. After a disastrous birthday party (Frank's), Ray, Debra, Robert and Erica go out for dinner. While Ray and Robert are away, Debra discovers that the girl is just 19. When Robert learns this he is shocked. Ray and Debra then find out that Robert had told her that he is 35 (his actual age being 43) and that Ray is 37. They break up and the remaining three finish their meals.
106	9	"Fighting In-Laws"	Michael Zinberg	Kathy Ann Stumpe	November 20, 2000	0008	21.37
Debra's parents drop in for Thanksgiving dinner, on their way to a spa hotel in Baden-Baden, Germany. On Thanksgiving eve, late in the night, Ray goes downstairs into the kitchen and accidentally overhears that they are having marital troubles and they are on the way to counseling in New Jersey, even having to hide and sleep in the garage to avoid being seen. During dinner next day, the truth comes out into the open.
107	10	"The Sneeze"	Ken Levine	Aaron Shure & Steve Skrovan	November 27, 2000	0010	19.29
Ray is sneezed on in the airport rest room. He becomes obsessed with it and thinks he is getting sick. Marie pampers him and puts him to bed. Debra is annoyed by all the mothering and asks Ray to get up. Later the doctor calls to inform that Ray is actually sick.
108	11	"Christmas Present"	Gary Halvorson	Kathy Ann Stumpe	December 11, 2000	0011	21.25
Ray buys Debra an elaborate Christmas gift in the hope that she will be so impressed she will let him go on a weekend golf trip. It backfires when Debra gets him a better gift and willingly allows him to go to the golf trip. Ray then thinks that she has some ulterior motive and confronts her. He goes overboard and ends up losing the golfing trip and also gets stuck with all the household work.
109	12	"What Good Are You?"	Ken Levine	Jennifer Crittenden	January 8, 2001	0012	20.28
Debra starts to choke on a piece of orange, but Ray does nothing. When she accuses him of being useless during emergencies, he talks to his mother. Marie agrees with Debra. Andy, Gianni and Robert make fun of him, so Ray tries to be too manly with Debra that evening, which turns out to be a bad evening.
110	13	"Super Bowl"	Gary Halvorson	Story by : Joe Bolster and Ray Romano & Mike Royce; Teleplay by : Ray Romano & Mike Royce	January 29, 2001	0014	21.48
Ray gets two tickets to the Super Bowl and he chooses Gianni to go with him. Frank, Robert and Debra get very upset, each wanting to be his companion. In the hotel, Ray realizes that his colleagues have brought their wives and he arranges to have Debra flown in. When Debra realizes that he has no plans to spend time with her, she decides to leave. To please her, he cancels the entire plan and also throws away the Super Bowl tickets. This makes Debra even angrier, having bluffed to get the tickets.
111	14	"Ray's Journal"	Kenneth Shapiro	Jennifer Crittenden	February 5, 2001	0013	21.13
Ray discovers Marie read his diary during middle and high school, and Marie makes him feel guilty for writing the things he did in it for her own interests. Ray discovers that Robert kept two journals, placing a fake one in the place where she would easily find it to fool her. Ray apologizes to Marie and edits out the entry saying: "I e-hat my mom".
112	15	"Silent Partners"	Gary Halvorson	Tucker Cawley	February 12, 2001	0016	18.56
After an uncomfortable meal at the restaurant, Ray and Debra discover they have nothing to say to each other anymore. They decide to take interest in each other's life. Debra starts watching sports with Ray and asks Ray to read a book with her. When Debra realizes that Ray did not read the book and is not interested in watching a game with her, she gets mad.
113	16	"Fairies"	Gary Halvorson	Aaron Korsh	February 19, 2001	0015	18.38
The twins play fairies in the school play and Frank tells Ray that this will make them gay. Ray is initially fine with the twins playing the parts, believing that the school assigned the roles, but objects when he realizes Debra specifically signed them up as fairies. He tries to change their part to boulders, but when he discovers that the twins actually want to be fairies, he gets their parts back and trains them.
114	17	"Stefania Arrives"	Gary Halvorson	Tucker Cawley & Lew Schneider	February 26, 2001	0017	18.08
Stefania (Alex Meneses), Robert's Italian girlfriend visits from Italy with her father. Robert initially likes it, but then realizes that she is annoying and breaks up with her. Stefania's father loves America and buys Nemo's to settle down in Long Island. After the break-up, to avoid Stefania's father's wrath, he lies to him that he is gay.
115	18	"Humm Vac"	Gary Halvorson	Lew Schneider	March 19, 2001	0018	19.07
Ray buys a new vacuum cleaner, which cleans well and makes Debra happy. When she realizes that Marie had sent over the salesgirl, Debra tries to find dirt in Marie's house. Debra then claims that Marie's obsessive cleaning and plastic covers on the furniture makes their house cold and the guests uncomfortable. Marie tries to loosen up, but after Frank makes a mess, she returns to her normal behavior.
116	19	"The Canister"	Gary Halvorson	David Regal	April 9, 2001	0021	18.74
Marie asks Debra to return a canister she borrowed, repeatedly brushing off Debra's insistence that she returned it already. Finally, Debra insists that Marie stop patronizing her and accept that it was returned. Marie apologizes to Debra, which astonishes Ray and Robert. Debra is elated that her relationship with Marie has taken a big step forward, just as Ally walks in with the canister that was in her room. Horrified, Debra first tries to destroy it, then attempts to sneak it into Marie's house, but gets caught. Frank takes the canister, lying that he had hidden it. When Debra confronts him about this, he admits to her that she is like a daughter to him, and doesn't like Marie's treatment of her.
117	20	"Net Worth"	David Lee	Jason Gelles & Mike Haukom	April 23, 2001	0019	17.19
Debra becomes angry when, without her knowledge, Ray contributes $1,000 to his friends' scheme to open a go-cart business. When he says that it's his money to invest, Debra gets upset and makes a bill for the services she does at home. When Marie, Frank and Robert walk in, they have a huge debate over the worth of their contribution towards the house. While Frank and Marie are at Ray's side, Robert is, of course, at Debra's side.
118	21	"Let's Fix Robert"	Gary Halvorson	Jennifer Crittenden & Mike Royce	April 30, 2001	0024	17.07
When Robert hears that Stefania and Amy have met, he is shocked. Marie hears about it and calls a meeting of Stefania, Amy and Judy to find out what's wrong with Robert and then fix him. Robert is forced to attend. Robert, shocked with it, apologizes to them. Marie then points out that he is not usable anymore and he leaves to Ray's house. He points out the fight and Debra fights with him, telling him that he pictured a perfect woman in his mind and that he dumps every girl that is not pictured like that. Robert admits that Debra is perfect in front of her and Ray, creating an uncomfortable situation.
119	22	"Say Uncle"	Kenneth Shapiro	Aaron Shure	May 7, 2001	0022	18.34
When Ray realizes that his kids would rather spend time with their Uncle Robert than with him, he decides to do take the kids to the zoo instead of letting Robert take them. When Robert objects that Ray doesn't like spending time with his kids, Ray tells him he should get his own life. Robert takes it badly and goes away. After Marie talks to Ray, he apologizes to Robert, who is "getting a life" by hot tubbing with his beautiful neighbors. Robert regrets his accusation, because, unlike Ray, Robert gets to leave when the kids get annoying.
120	23	"Separation"	Asaad Kelada	Philip Rosenthal	May 14, 2001	0023	17.22
Lois arrives at Debra's house and announces that she and Warren are separated. Lois' calm, casual manner makes it even more disturbing to Debra, who blames Lois for the separation. Ray is unable to understand why Debra is getting upset over something that was long coming, even smiling a bit in front of her, offending her deeply. Warren arrives at Debra's house on Ally's birthday to tell her that Lois is not at fault and it was all mutual, making her cry. Her world shaken, Debra asks Ray to hold her tightly.
121	24	"Frank Paints the House"	David Lee	Scott Buck	May 21, 2001	0020	20.13
Frank paints Ray's house against his wishes, and enlists Robert and Ray to help. When Frank bosses them around and chooses a color Ray does not approve of, Ray tells him to go home. Marie then explains that Frank was fired from his last job. Ray confronts Frank, and Frank loudly explains his reasons for making the decisions he had made about painting the house, stating that he shouldn't need to explain. Ray apologizes and brings him back, agreeing that Frank will be in charge. In the end, Ray then plays a prank on Robert who gets to use the power-brush, but he end up spraying lemon-meringue paint on Marie's face. A passing Frank dryly notes that she will require another coat.
122	25	"Ally's Birth"	Jerry Zaks	Tucker Cawley	May 21, 2001	0025	20.13
At a father/daughter dance, Ray realizes his daughter is growing up and recalls the days before Ally was born. In the flashback, Debra and Ray's pregnancy is constantly interrupted by Marie, who intrudes in everything from telling Ray about the baby to bossing Debra around about how to behave during pregnancy. After 9 months, when Debra is ready to give birth, she is fed up with Marie's constant intrusion. When her water breaks, she lies to Marie and just goes to the hospital with Ray and Robert. When they are stuck in traffic, Robert tries to deliver the baby, but it turns out to be a false alarm. Finally, Ally is born in a hospital, and Marie gives a cold shoulder for all of ten seconds.
