= Ray's Journal =

- Everybody Loves Raymond episode
- Episode no.: Season 5 Episode 14
- Directed by: Kenneth Shapiro
- Written by: Jennifer Crittenden
- Cinematography by: Mike Berlin
- Editing by: Patricia Barnett
- Production code: 0013
- Original air date: February 5, 2001
- Running time: 22 minutes

Episode chronology
← Previous "Super Bowl"	Next → "Silent Partners"
- Everybody Loves Raymond (season 5)

"Ray's Journal" is the 14th episode of the fifth season of the American sitcom Everybody Loves Raymond (1996–2005). The episode aired on February 5, 2001 on CBS.

== Reception ==
DVDTalk reviewer Jeffrey Robinson called "Ray's Journal" the best episode of the fifth season: "What kind of stuff [Ray puts] in [his journal] is a pure comic genius. His entries are very personal and very embarrassing. You will just have to watch the episode to hear about it. You will not regret it." The Star-Ledger put it in an unranked list of the top ten best episodes of Everybdoy Loves Raymond, describing it as "the most honest exploration of this usually smothering mother-son relationship," and was one of Roberts' favorite episodes of the series. For their involvement in "Ray's Journal," Roberts won a Primetime Emmy Award for Outstanding Supporting Actress in a Comedy Series, and Romano was nominated for Outstanding Lead Actor in a Comedy Series. Crittenden also won a Humanitas Prize in the 30-minute show category for writing the episode.
