= Italy (Everybody Loves Raymond) =

- Everybody Loves Raymond episodes
- Episode nos.: Season 5 Episodes 1/2
- Directed by: Gary Halvorson
- Written by: Philip Rosenthal
- Production code: 0001/0002
- Original air date: October 2, 2000
- Running time: 44 minutes

Guest appearances
- Silvana De Santis as Colletta; Pierrino Mascarino as Giorgio; Alex Meneses as Stefania; David Proval as Marco Fogagnolo

Episode chronology
← Previous "Robert's Divorce"	Next → "Wallpaper"

"Italy" is the hour-long season five premiere of the American television sitcom Everybody Loves Raymond. Constituting the 98th and 99th overall episodes of the series, they were written by the creator Philip Rosenthal and directed by Gary Halvorson. In this episode of the show, which revolves around the life of Italian-American Newsday sportswriter Raymond Barone and his oddball family, his parents, Marie and Frank, announce that they're all going to Italy to visit the former's cousin Colletta, and everyone is excited to go except Raymond. Meanwhile, during the trip, Ray's brother Robert is attracted to a woman named Stefania, and tries to get past her father Signore Fogagnolo to meet her. With both parts originally airing on October 2, 2000, on CBS as an hour-long episode, the episode has earned positive reviews from critics and received a Writers Guild of America Award.

== Plot ==
Frank and Marie announce to their family that they're all going to Italy for two weeks. Marie reasons that with her birthday coming up, she is using the money she had kept aside for 45 years to pay for the family to meet her cousin Colletta, who lives in a small village outside of Rome. Everyone is excited to go, except Ray. Ray informs Debra that he doesn't want to go on the trip because he has no interest in other cultures. Debra replies that she doesn't want his "dumbness" to ruin the vacation.

The family arrive at Colleta's home, who welcomes them along with her husband Giorgio. Ray begins developing a cold which he claims he got from the air conditioning on the van they rode. Robert also becomes miserable, due to his "dilemma"; because he plans to marry Amy but keeps focusing on his ex-wife Joanne, he claims that he is unable to sort out his feelings. At a gelato parlor, he becomes attracted to a waitress named Stefania Fogagnolo, whose father Signore Fogagnolo is also the owner. He visits Rome with Stefania, but she tells him she doesn't want her dad to know she is dating. Meanwhile, Ray also goes to the city with the rest of the family, but while Debra, Frank, and Marie are apparently having a great time, Ray is bored and unimpressed with the renowned sights, complaining they are decrepit.

After some time visiting Rome, Debra finally bursts out about Ray's attitude towards the trip and compares his behavior to Frank and Marie's; she argues that while his parents are at least trying to make the best out of things, he has been "a grumpy pain-in-the-ass". Angered, Ray tells her he "will not be a pain in anyone's ass anymore" and gets away from the three. Meanwhile, Signore Fogagnolo catches Stefania and Robert about to make out in her room, and goes after Robert. It also appears that the trip is starting to go downhill for Frank, Marie, and Debra. Marie decides Ray should take a walk with her to lighten him up and release her stress from Debra's behavior towards him moping and not wanting to have fun. During the walk, he realizes that his cold has cleared up, and starts to become positive and enjoys the vacation.

At lunch, Robert, who confronts Marco again, decides to talk with him in Italian so he can convince him to be with Stefania. Meanwhile, Ray gives flowers to some of the women, including Colleta, Marie, and Debra. Ray shows Debra that he is starting to enjoy the beautiful scenery and slower pace of Italy and interacting with the locals, which makes Debra happy, and the two go on their own date around Rome, as well and Marie and Frank. Colleta and Giorgio give a farewell to the family, while Robert and Stefania say goodbye to each other with Marco watching them. During the van ride, all the family members together sing "C'è La Luna Mezzo Mare".

The episode ends with Ray annoying his fellow passengers by singing loudly in Italian on the plane back to New York.

== Production ==
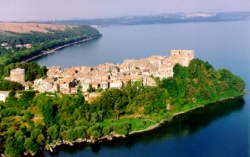
"Italy" was filmed in the town of Anguillara Sabazia outside of Rome.

After the first season of Everybody Loves Raymond ended in 1997, series creator Philip Rosenthal asked Ray Romano what he was going to do over the summer. Romano wanted to go to the Jersey Shore, and Rosenthal suggested they go to Italy; Romano, an Italian himself, did not accept his offer because he was "not really interested in other cultures." At that moment, Rosenthal began to conceive of the episode. Romano was sent to Italy by Rosenthal, and he eventually came around on the country. Rosenthal and a reluctant Romano pitched "Italy" to a CBS, who eventually accepted the idea. A major reason Romano did the episode was to vacation with his wife Anna Romano while off-camera. It was filmed in July 2000 in the town Anguillara Sabazia outside of Rome. Since it was shot on-location, it was filmed single-camera juxtaposed to the series' usual multi-camera setup.

Romano enjoyed his time filming the episode, highlighting the food, but noting the small toilet seats as a complaint. Patricia Heaton had not gone to Italy since the 1980s as a model for a shoe company. Doris Roberts complained of copious walking, especially on uneven cobblestone; Brad Garrett joked about gorging himself on food during the trip; and Peter Boyle thought of it as an earned "working vacation".

Directed by Gary Halvorson, "Italy" guest stars Silvana De Santis as Colletta, Pierrino Mascarino as Giorgio, Alex Meneses as Stefania, David Proval as Signore Fogagnolo, Enzo Vitagliano as the Bocce player, Sergio Sivori, Vanni Bramat, Luca Francucci and Alessandro Francucci. Romano first hinted of the episode in an interview published that same month in the Rome News-Tribune.

According to the Los Angeles Times, Brad Garrett threatened not to participate in the two-part episode unless he got a raise, which he was given.

== Release and reception ==
"Italy" initially aired on the American television network CBS as an hour-long episode on October 2, 2000. In 2005, it was released to DVD as part of the official DVD release for the fifth season, which also came with an audio commentary for both parts of the episode by Phil Rosenthal and Ray Romano. "Italy" has been positively received by critics. Former DVD Verdict writer Russell Engebretson said that while the episode "veers into sentimentality, it provides a dose of sweetness to counter a few of the more darkly comic episodes [of season five], especially the funny but bitter "Christmas Present." He also praised the impressive cinematography. DVD Talk's Jeffrey Robinson called it "a fun way to start the season. It was a nice change of pace after the same settings and atmospheres." He also highlighted the introduction of a new love interest for Robert. However, in a mixed review published in The Gadsden Times, David Kronke opined that in keeping with the nature of usual "special" episodes, "it's not quite up to the series' usual laugh quotient." On March 2, 2002, Rosenthal won the Writers Guild of America Award for Episodic Comedy for writing "Italy". He has cited the episode to be one of his favorites of Everybody Loves Raymond.

=== Legacy ===
Rosenthal based the general idea of his television series Somebody Feed Phil on the episodes, mainly due to him seeing how the character of Ray reacted to visiting a new location.
