= Sarah Rush =

American actress (born 1955)

- Born: Sarah Kathleen Rush; September 20, 1955 (age 71); Waynesburg, Pennsylvania, U.S.
- Education: Waynesburg Central High School
- Alma mater: Pennsylvania State University
- Occupation: Actress
- Years active: 1978–present
- Known for: Battlestar Galactica; Catch Me If You Can
- Spouse: Fred Bova (divorced)
- Children: Amanda Grace Bova
- Website: No longer active

Sarah Kathleen Rush is an American actress, best known in television for her work in the original Battlestar Galactica. She narrated and starred in the 2005 documentary The Bituminous Coal Queens of Pennsylvania, produced by Patricia Heaton and directed by David Hunt, who is Heaton's husband, which won the 2006 Heartland Film Festival Award. Rush was herself crowned Coal Queen in 1972.

Rush was born on September 20, 1955, in Waynesburg, Pennsylvania and graduated from Waynesburg Central High School in Waynesburg in 1973. She is a member of the Actors Studio in Midtown Manhattan, New York, an acting student of Uta Hagen and Milton Katselas, and graduated with a BFA degree in theater summa cum laude from Pennsylvania State University. She was married to Fred Bova and they have a daughter, Amanda Grace Bova.

== Theater ==
- Our Town directed by Gower Champion and also starring Eddie Albert
- As You Like It directed by Tony Richardson and also starring Stockard Channing
- The Glass Menagerie directed by Lee Shallat
- Toyer at the Kennedy Center directed by Sir Tony Richardson and also starring Kathleen Turner, Brad Davis, and Kevin Spacey
- She Stoops to Conquer in the title role
- The Belle of Amherst, a one-woman show on the life of Emily Dickinson
- Alma in Summer and Smoke
- Angel in When You Comin' Back, Red Ryder? starring Christopher McDonald

== Television ==
- The Incredible Hulk (1978) — Young Woman (1 episode)
- Dr. Strange (1978) — Nurse (1 episode)
- Sword of Justice (1978) — Cathy (1 episode)
- Battlestar Galactica (1978–1979) — Flight Cpl. Rigel (11 episodes)
- Happy Days (1979) — Fern (1 episode) (episode "Fonzie and the She-Devils")
- The Seekers (1979) — Amanda Kent
- Roughecks (1980) — Carol McBride
- Quincy, M.E. (1978–1980) — Trish Granby, Dr. Harriett Bowlin (3 episodes)
- Modesty Blaise (1982) — Emma Woodhouse
- For Love of Angela (1982) — Angela Tanner
- Bret Maverick (1982) — Princess Athena (1 episode)
- Tales from the Darkside (1986) — Laura Burns (1 episode)
- Monty — Psychic (1 episode)
- Crossroads Cafe (1996) — Anna Brashov (2 episodes)
- Everybody Loves Raymond (1998) — Woman (1 episode)
- Chicken Soup for the Soul (2000) — Mrs. Calloway (1 episode)
- Friends (2002) — Nurse #3 (1 episode)
- The Megan Mullally Show (2006) — Herself (1 episode)
- Monk (2009) — Nurse Judy Fitzgerald (1 episode)

== Filmography ==
- Joni (1979) — Kathy Eareckson
- The Nude Bomb (1980) — Pam Krovney
- Years of the Beast (1981) — Cindy
- The Prodigal (1983) — Laura
- Talking to Strangers (1988) — Potter
- Fangs (2001) — Lois Bostwick
- Max Keeble's Big Move (2001) — Ms. Lane
- Destiny (2002) — Diane
- Catch Me If You Can (2002) — Secretary
- Legally Blonde 2: Red, White & Blonde (2003)
- The Bituminous Coal Queens of Pennsylvania (2005) — Narrator
