= The Bituminous Coal Queens of Pennsylvania =

- Directed by: David Hunt; Jody Eldred
- Produced by: Patricia Heaton
- Starring: Sarah Rush; Fabian
- Cinematography: Jody Eldred; René Jung
- Edited by: Edgar Burcksen
- Music by: Michael Wolff
- Distributed by: Netflix
- Release date: October 16, 2005 (Heartland Film Festival)
- Running time: 89 minutes
- Country: United States
- Language: English
- Budget: $350,000

The Bituminous Coal Queens of Pennsylvania is a 2005 documentary film directed by David Hunt and Jody Eldred about the fiftieth annual "Pennsylvania Bituminous Coal Queen" beauty pageant which took place on Sunday, August 17, 2003, at the State Theatre Center for the Arts (Uniontown, Pennsylvania). The film is produced by Hunt's wife Patricia Heaton, and prominently features actress Sarah Rush, who was herself a Coal Queen in her youth. Heaton describes the film as "an homage to small town America".

The film follows the past and present contestants and winners of the annual beauty pageant sponsored by the bituminous coal industry of Greene County, Pennsylvania and was shot over a 10-day period in August 2003. The film's budget swelled from $45,000 to $350,000 after the licensing for the various song snippets that appear in the contestants' acts.

A memorable character is the pageant's stage manager, who is easily offended when the contestants make requests and suggestions. He has since been fired.

Featured contestants
Name	Act	Representing
Dana Bukovitz	Tap dance	Frazier High School
Alyssa Corfont	Tap dance to "Fame"	Waynesburg Central High School
Elizabeth Gessner	Piano and voice performance of "Change the World"	Geibel Catholic High School
Mary Hawkins	Dance	Jefferson-Morgan High School
Christine Henry	Dance	Mapletown Junior-Senior High School
Jessica Levo	Voice performance of "I Enjoy Being a Girl"	Carmichaels Area High School
Abbey Lion	Dance	Laurel Highlands High School
Ryann Over	Dance/lipsync to "All That Jazz"	Uniontown Area Senior High School
Malana Piatt	Baton performance to "All That Jazz"	Bethlehem Center High School
Michelle Tanner	Voice performance of "The Rose"	Albert Gallatin High School
Laura Yost	Xylophone	Clay-Battelle High School
