= Brave, Pennsylvania =

Unincorporated community in Pennsylvania, US

- Census-designated place
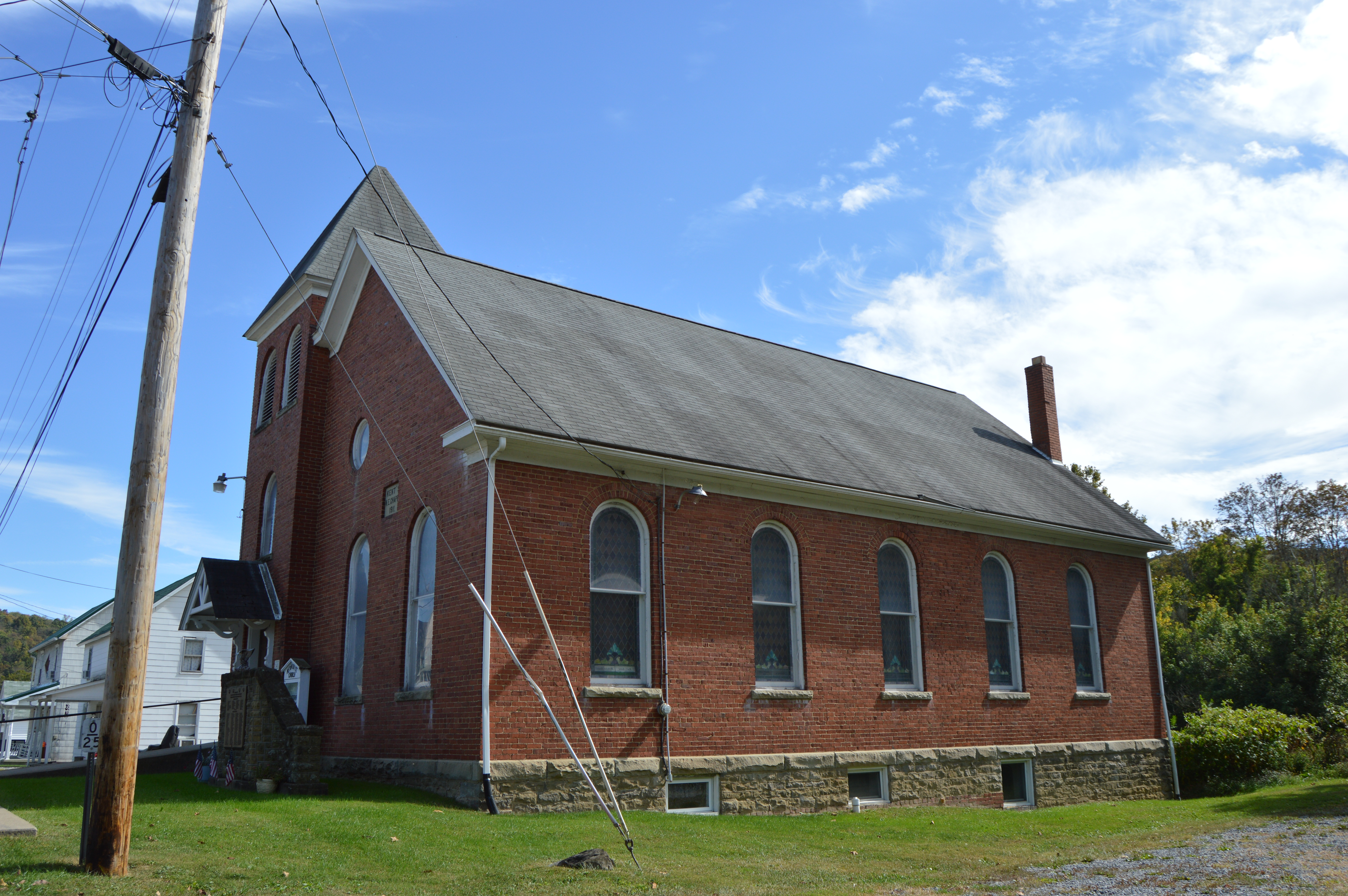
- Kents Chapel United Methodist Church

- Location within Pennsylvania Location within the United States
- Coordinates: 39°43′35″N 80°15′33″W
- Country: United States
- State: Pennsylvania
- County: Greene
- Township: Wayne

Area
  - Total: 0.89 sq mi (2.31 km^{2})
  - Land: 0.89 sq mi (2.31 km^{2})
  - Water: 0 sq mi (0.00 km^{2})
- Elevation: 965 ft (294 m)

Population (2020)
  - Total: 142
  - Density: 159.2/sq mi (61.46/km^{2})
- Time zone: UTC-5 (Eastern (EST))
  - Summer (DST): UTC-4 (EDT)
- ZIP code: 15316
- FIPS code: 42-08312
- GNIS feature ID: 2629999

Brave is an unincorporated community and census-designated place (CDP) in Wayne Township, Greene County, Pennsylvania, United States. It lies in Pennsylvania's southwestern corner near the West Virginia border. As of the 2010 census the population was 201.

== Demographics ==
Historical population
Census	Pop.	Note	%±
2010	201		—
2020	142		−29.4%
U.S. Decennial Census

== History ==
During the early 1900s, a cooling system was built on the Dunkard Creek by People's Natural Gas Company to facilitate its operations at a compressor station in Brave. This system consisted of pipes which were placed at the creek's bottom, plus two dams built to provide a consistent flow of water supply to and through the cooling system, enabling the compressor station to cool the gas which was processed there. Although the compressor station was closed in 1959, the apparatus from that cooling system was left in place, causing a series of environmental issues. Among the problems, the presence of the system prevented fish from migrating, and was also found to have contributed to a golden algae bloom, which was responsible for a massive fish kill that destroyed most of the aquatic life along a 43-mile stretch of the stream in 2009. In response, the U.S. Department of Agriculture's Natural Resources Conservation Service contacted Ed and Verna Presley, the present-day owners of the land where the lower dam was located, and Anderson Fittings, the owner of the upper dam and brass plant, in 2010 to arrange to demolish both dams. The project, which was made possible with funds from the American Recovery and Reinvestment Act, was initially estimated to cost between $77,000 and $150,000.

Skylar Neese was murdered on July 6, 2012 in a site in Wayne Township, near Brave.

== Education ==
The school district for all of Wayne Township is Central Greene School District.
