= Patricia Heaton Parties =

American cooking television series

- Genre: Cooking show; Food reality television
- Presented by: Patricia Heaton
- Country of origin: United States
- Original language: English
- No. of seasons: 2
- No. of episodes: 16

Production
- Producer: Relativity Media
- Running time: 22:00

Original release
- Network: Food Network
- Release: October 24, 2015 – August 13, 2016

Patricia Heaton Parties is an American cooking television series that aired on Food Network. It was presented by actress Patricia Heaton, and it featured Heaton showcasing how to prepare different recipes for themed parties. The series debuted on October 24, 2015, and was initially supposed to air for only one season, but a second season began airing on June 11, 2016; and concluded on August 13, 2016.

In 2016, the series won a Daytime Emmy Award for Outstanding Culinary Program.

== Episodes ==
=== Season 1 (2015) ===
No.	Title	Original air date	Production code
1	"Heaton Up Halloween"	October 24, 2015	PP0101H
2	"Beauties and the Bites"	October 31, 2015	PP0102H
3	"Tailgate Temptations" (Note: "Tailgate Temptations" was produced as the fourth episode of the first season, but it aired as the third episode of the season.)	November 7, 2015	PP0104H
4	"Comfort Food Favorites" (Note: "Comfort Food Favorites" was produced as the final episode of the first season, but it aired as the fourth episode of the season.)	November 14, 2015	PP0106H
5	"Silver Anniversary Surprise" (Note: "Silver Anniversary Surprise" was produced as the third episode of the first season, but it aired as the fifth episode of the season.)	November 28, 2015	PP0103H
6	"Family Circus" (Note: "Family Circus" was produced as the fifth episode of the first season, but it aired as the sixth episode of the season.)	December 5, 2015	PP0105H

=== Season 2 (2016) ===
No.	Title	Original air date	Production code
1	"1970s Throwback"	June 11, 2016	PP0201H
2	"Steakhouse Snacks"	June 18, 2016	PP0202H
3	"Movie Night Memories"	June 25, 2016	PP0203H
4	"Americana Barbecue"	July 2, 2016	PP0204H
5	"Staycation"	July 9, 2016	PP0205H
6	"Camp Patty"	July 16, 2016	PP0206H
7	"Bubbly Birthday Brunch"	July 23, 2016	PP0207H
8	"Luau Party"	July 30, 2016	PP0208H
9	"Patty Pampers"	August 6, 2016	PP0209H
10	"Reunion Cast Party"	August 13, 2016	PP0210H
