= The Beldham =

2024 horror film

- Theatrical release poster
- Directed by: Angela Gulner
- Written by: Angela Gulner
- Produced by: Angela Gulner; Talia Bella; Mark Meir; Randy Wayne
- Starring: Patricia Heaton; Katie Parker; Emma Fitzpatrick; Corbin Bernsen
- Cinematography: Ksusha Genenfeld
- Edited by: Dashiell Reinhardt
- Music by: Stephen Limbaugh
- Production companies: Rebellium Films; Wicked Myth Films
- Distributed by: Signature Entertainment (United Kingdom, Ireland, Latin America); Quiver Distribution (United States)
- Release dates: October 2024 (Sitges); October 20, 2025 (United Kingdom, Ireland, Latin America); November 7, 2025 (United States)
- Running time: 85 minutes
- Country: United States
- Language: English

The Beldham (also known as The House at Hallow End) is a 2024 American psychological horror film written and directed by Angela Gulner in her directorial debut. The film stars Patricia Heaton, Katie Parker, Emma Fitzpatrick and Corbin Bernsen. It follows a young mother with a child returning to her mother's family home, where something evil threatens her and her child. Signature Entertainment released the film on video on demand in the United Kingdom, Ireland and Latin America on October 20, 2025 . The film was released by Quiver Distribution in the United States on November 7, 2025.

== Cast ==
- Patricia Heaton as Sadie
- Katie Parker as Harper
- Emma Fitzpatrick as Bette
- Corbin Bernsen as Frank
- Hannah Reese as The Beldham

== Production ==
On February 22, 2023, it was reported that Patricia Heaton would star in The Beldham, a psychological horror film written and directed by Angela Gulner. Corbin Bernsen, Katie Parker, Emma Fitzpatrick and Hannah Reese also was cast. Filming began in Oklahoma later in February.

== Release ==
The film premiered at The 57th Sitges International Fantastic Film Festival of Catalonia in October 2024. It later screened at the Austin Film Festival on October 25, 2024.

== Reception ==
On the review aggregator website Rotten Tomatoes, 82% of 11 critics' reviews are positive. Stephanie Malone from the Morbidly Beautiful gave it 3.5/5 stars writing: "You don’t have to be a mother to appreciate The Beldham in all its gut-wrenching glory, but it certainly helps. An exquisite payoff adds depth and makes every meticulously crafted piece of the puzzle fall perfectly into place." DarkSkyLady critic gave it a positive review praising the performances of female cast. Roberto Tyler Ortiz from Loud and Clear Reviews gave it 3/5 stars writing: "In striving to deliver a fresh take on a familiar trope, The Beldham highlights the chilling isolation of motherhood but loses its grip on the emotional depth that could have made its narrative truly haunting." In a review by Catherine Bray of The Guardian, she compared the film positively to The Babadook, released in 2014.
