= Murder of Skylar Neese =

2012 murder in Pennsylvania, United States

- Skylar Neese (c. 2009–2010)
- Location: Wayne Township, Greene County, Pennsylvania
- Date: July 6, 2012
- Attack type: Murder by stabbing
- Weapon: Two knives
- Victim: Skylar Neese
- Perpetrators: Shelia Eddy; Rachel Shoaf
- Verdict: Both Eddy and Shoaf pleaded guilty
- Convictions: Eddy: First-degree murder Shoaf: Second-degree murder
- Sentence: Eddy: Life imprisonment with eligibility for parole after 15 years Shoaf: 30 years in prison with eligibility for parole after 10 years

Skylar Annette Neese (February 10, 1996 – July 6, 2012) was a sixteen-year-old American girl who disappeared from her home in Star City, West Virginia, around midnight on July 6, 2012. Her body was found in January 2013, across the nearby state line, in Wayne Township, Greene County, Pennsylvania.

Neese was murdered by two of her high school best friends, Shelia Eddy and Rachel Shoaf. In January 2013, Shoaf confessed to authorities that she and Eddy planned and carried out Neese's murder. Shoaf pleaded guilty to second-degree murder on May 1, 2013, and was sentenced to 30 years in prison with eligibility for parole after 10 years. Eddy pleaded guilty to first-degree murder on January 24, 2014, and was sentenced to life in prison with eligibility for parole after 15 years. Neese's disappearance led to new West Virginia legislation that made changes to the Amber alert missing child alert system.

== Background ==
=== Victim ===
Skylar Annette Neese was born February 10, 1996, and was the only child of Mary and Dave Neese. At the time, Mary Neese was working as an administrative assistant at a cardiac laboratory and Dave Neese was a product assembler at Walmart. Skylar was an honor student at University High School in Monongalia County and wanted to become a criminal defense attorney. She had a part-time job at Wendy's.

=== Perpetrators ===
Shelia Rae Eddy (born September 28, 1995) was born in Blacksville, West Virginia, to Tara Clendenen and Greg Eddy. Eddy's parents divorced in 2000 after her father was in a car wreck that left him with a traumatic brain injury. Eddy had been friends with Skylar Neese since they were eight years old, after having met at a local children's activity program called The Shack. After her mother remarried in 2010, she and her mother moved from Blacksville to Morgantown, West Virginia, where Shelia then started to attend University High School alongside Skylar Neese.

Rachel Elizabeth Shoaf (born June 10, 1996) was raised in Morgantown, West Virginia. She is the daughter of Rusty and Patricia Shoaf. Rachel Shoaf attended a private Catholic school until high school. She then started attending University High School, where she met Eddy and Neese.

== Disappearance ==
On July 5, 2012, Neese returned to her family's Star City, West Virginia, apartment after working a shift at Wendy's. Her apartment complex's surveillance video shows Neese left the apartment via her bedroom window at 12:30 a.m. on July 6 and got into a light-colored sedan. At first, the identities of the occupants were unknown, until early fall of 2012. After having been caught in a lie about the timeline of when Neese was picked up, Eddy admitted that the car was hers. Neese's father said she did not take her cell phone charger, contact lenses, or solution; that her window was left open; and that he thought she had planned on coming home.

=== Murder ===
According to the court transcript, Shoaf said that she and Eddy picked up Neese in Eddy's car. In the trunk of the car, Eddy and Shoaf had hidden cleaning rags, bleach, wet wipes, a shovel, and clean clothes to change into once the murder was completed. They wrapped the knives in towels and tucked them under their arms. They pulled up to Neese's apartment complex around 12:30 AM, where she was seen climbing into the back seat of the car. The girls then drove to Brave, Pennsylvania, approximately 30 miles from Neese's home, and stopped at a location that all three girls were familiar with as they had been there on occasions to smoke marijuana. The three girls got out of the car and began socializing. Shoaf and Eddy claimed that they had forgotten to bring a lighter with them. Neese said she would go to the car to retrieve a lighter. After turning her back to them, Shoaf and Eddy counted to three, after which the two attacked Neese and stabbed her to death. Neese attempted to run, but was tackled by Shoaf. At some point during the murder, Neese managed to get Shoaf's knife from her and stabbed her above the ankle. Shoaf claimed that she stopped the attack after being injured but that Eddy continued to stab Neese until there was complete silence and Neese's neck "stopped making weird sounds." After they were certain Neese was dead, the teens attempted to bury Neese's body, but were unable to do so because the ground was too hard and rocky, so they instead covered the body with branches, dirt, and leaves. Shoaf and Eddy changed out of their bloody clothing, wiped themselves and the car down with wet wipes, and left the scene, several hours before Neese's absence from her room was noticed.

== Investigation ==
Neese was initially considered by law enforcement authorities to be a runaway and an Amber alert was not issued for the then-minimum 48 hours in connection with her disappearance. An early tip indicated that Neese had been seen in Carolina Beach, North Carolina, but the Star City Police Department determined that the person spotted was not Neese. Neese's parents posted flyers about their missing daughter around Monongalia County.

Police determined that the unknown sedan in which Neese was last seen belonged to Eddy and interviewed her. Eddy admitted to picking up Neese but stated that she had dropped her off an hour later. However, cellphone location data and surveillance camera footage contradicted Eddy's story. The Federal Bureau of Investigation and West Virginia State Police joined the search for Neese on September 10, 2012, and began interviewing Neese's school friends. Approximately six months after the murder occurred, Rachel Shoaf suffered a nervous breakdown, prompting her mother to call 911. In the background of the call, Shoaf can be heard screaming. She was taken to a local psychiatric hospital, where she remained for five days. After she was released Shoaf asked to be immediately taken to her lawyer's office, where she then confessed to the crime. The motivation Shoaf gave for the murder was they "didn't like her" and "didn't want to be friends with her anymore". In one of many attempts to get Eddy to incriminate herself, investigators had Shoaf wear a wire during a conversation with Eddy but were not successful. Investigators obtained a search warrant for Eddy's home, where they confiscated her devices, several kitchen knives, and a Toyota Camry. Forensic testing matched DNA found in the trunk of Eddy's car to Neese. David Neese stated that the two girls were among his daughter's best friends and that Eddy had helped the family by distributing missing person flyers. After her confession, Shoaf led investigators to Neese's body. On March 13, 2013, U.S. Attorney William J. Ihlenfeld II issued a press release stating that a body found just over the nearby state line on January 16, 2013, in Wayne Township, Greene County, Pennsylvania, had been identified as the body of Neese. Neese's body was found less than 30 miles (48 km) away from her home.

== Criminal charges ==
On May 1, 2013, Shoaf pleaded guilty to second-degree murder. The court transcript indicates that other students overheard conversations between Shoaf and Eddy about the murder plot, but failed to report it, even after the murder, initially mistakenly believing that the girls were joking. According to Shoaf's plea agreement, she pleaded guilty to murder in the second degree by "unlawfully, feloniously, willfully, maliciously and intentionally causing the death of Skylar Neese by stabbing her and causing fatal injuries". In the plea agreement, the State of West Virginia recommended a sentence of 20 years incarceration. Shoaf's family issued a public apology, through their lawyer, for their daughter's actions. Following her guilty plea on May 1, 2013, on February 26, 2014, Shoaf received a sentence of 30 years in prison, with eligibility for parole after 10 years.

On September 4, 2013, West Virginia prosecutors publicly identified Eddy as the second alleged perpetrator of the murder of Neese and announced that she would be tried as an adult. Eddy was indicted by a grand jury on September 6, 2013, on one count of kidnapping, one count of first-degree murder and one count of conspiracy to commit murder. She pleaded not guilty.

The date of the trial was originally set for January 28, 2014. Facing the prospect of additional charges from Pennsylvania authorities, Eddy pleaded guilty to first-degree murder. She expressed no remorse, but was sentenced to life in prison "with mercy"; while sentenced as an adult, West Virginia law (as confirmed by Miller v. Alabama) requires that a juvenile offender have a possibility of parole on a whole-life sentence, with Eddy eligible for parole after 15 years. Pennsylvania authorities did not file charges as per the plea deal.

Eddy originally was held in a facility for juveniles after her arrest. As of February 2026, Eddy and Shoaf both remain in custody at the Lakin Correctional Center and Jail (LCC), adjacent to the Ohio River. Shoaf has been denied parole three times, in 2023 and 2024, and 2026. She will have another parole hearing in June 2027 with the date of April 30, 2028 as the projected release date. According to the West Virginia Division of Corrections and Rehabilitation, Eddy's first parole hearing is set for May 1, 2028.

== Skylar's Law ==
An Amber alert was not issued in Skylar Neese's disappearance because the circumstances did not meet all four criteria for an alert to be issued: (1) a child is believed to be abducted; (2) the child is under 18; (3) the child may be in danger of death or serious injury; (4) there is sufficient information to indicate the Amber alert would be helpful. At the time, a waiting period of 48 hours had to elapse before a teenager could be considered missing. In any case, Neese was killed long before she was reported missing.

Delegate Charlene Marshall introduced a bill, called Skylar's Law, to modify West Virginia's Amber Alert plan to allow for immediate issue of public announcements when any child is reported missing and in danger, regardless of whether the child is believed to have been kidnapped. Opinion columns appeared in both West Virginia and national media in support of Skylar's Law, although there was also some criticism of the legislation. On March 27, 2013, the West Virginia House of Delegates unanimously approved Skylar's Law. On April 12, 2013, the West Virginia Senate unanimously passed the law, but made minor technical changes to the bill which the House of Delegates voted to accept on the same day. West Virginia Governor Earl Ray Tomblin signed the legislation into law in May 2013.

== See also ==
- Child murder
- List of murdered American children
- List of solved missing person cases (post-2000)
- Murder of Michele Avila
- Murder of Shanda Sharer
- Murder of Maryann Measles
- Murder of Reena Virk
- Murder of Tristyn Bailey
- Murder of Laurie Show
- Missing person
- National Center for Missing & Exploited Children
- Slender Man stabbing
