= Beck (British TV series) =

- Genre: Mystery
- Written by: Paul Hines
- Directed by: Ken Grieve; Maurice Phillips; James Hazeldine
- Starring: Amanda Redman; Caroline Loncq; David Hunt; David Herlihy; Nigel Clauzel; William Ash; Timothy Gleed; Camilla Power
- Country of origin: United Kingdom
- Original language: English
- No. of series: 1
- No. of episodes: 6

Production
- Executive producer: Adrian Bate
- Producers: Jacky Stoller; Simon Mills
- Production locations: London, England
- Editor: Roy Sharman
- Running time: 50 minutes
- Production companies: Tempest Films & Television

Original release
- Network: BBC1
- Release: 2 October – 1 November 1996

Beck is a British television mystery series, first broadcast on 2 October 1996, that ran for a total of six episodes on BBC1. The series starred Amanda Redman as the title character, Beck, who runs Locate, a missing persons agency based in Kings Cross, London. The series co-starred Caroline Loncq, David Hunt, David Herlihy and William Ash. All six episodes were written by Paul Hines, with Ken Grieve, Maurice Phillips and James Hazeldine each directing two episodes.

Notably, Redman began a relationship with director Maurice Phillips while working together on the show. A review from The Independent said of the series; "Beck, the new private dick series, is set in this world of whores, pimps, addicts and runaways. It features our old friend, gritty realism, so there is vomit on the floor again and a dosser on every doorstep." A second series was confirmed to have been in the works at the time of broadcast, although it never materialised. Notably, the series has never been released on DVD.

== Cast ==
- Amanda Redman as Beck; private detective and owner of 'Locate', a missing persons agency
- Caroline Loncq as Therese
- David Hunt as Mick Farrant
- David Herlihy as Tally
- Nigel Clauzel as Muffy
- William Ash as Ralph
- Timothy Gleed as Joe
- Camilla Power as Charity

== Episodes ==
No.	Title	Directed by	Written by	British air date
1	"Embers"	Maurice Phillips	Paul Hines	2 October 1996
When she hears that human remains have been found near Reading, Beck fears that a teenager on the agency's books is dead.
2	"I'll Be Seeing You"	Maurice Phillips	Paul Hines	9 October 1996
A woman who has been held prisoner by her brutal husband is set free by his death. She asks Beck to track down her wartime love.
3	"Me, Myself and I"	Ken Grieve	Paul Hines	16 October 1996
Beck is asked to find a recently widowed pharmacist.
4	"Pride Before A Fall"	Ken Grieve	Paul Hines	23 October 1996
Beck's personal and professional pride is hit hard after she finds Karen Quinn, a young woman in her mid-twenties suffering from depression. Beck reunites her with her husband and baby, only for her to go missing again a few hours later. Beck also takes the case of a missing bridegroom when members of his stag party turn up offering £700 to locate him.
5	"Limbo – Part 1"	James Hazeldine	Paul Hines	30 October 1996
Mick introduces Beck to Martin, a middle-aged man who has been found wandering the streets with complete memory loss. Beck does not have an easy task in finding out Martin's true identity, but she later discovers him to be Andy Dwyer, an accountant with a daughter who is in a coma after a road accident. Moreover, the young girl's trust fund has disappeared.
6	"Limbo – Part 2"	James Hazeldine	Paul Hines	1 November 1996
Beck continues to help Andy Dwyer. But is his amnesia genuine? Who took the money from his daughter's trust fund? And is Joan Jacobs' new lodger all that he claims to be? Meanwhile, Beck also has to deal with problems at her office and with her employees.
