= Chuck Heaton =

American sportswriter, columnist, author, and commentator

- Born: Charles Walter Heaton Jr. October 22, 1917; Yonkers, New York, U.S.
- Died: February 14, 2008 (aged 90); Westlake, Ohio, U.S.
- Education: Bachelor of Arts, Journalism
- Alma mater: John Carroll University
- Occupations: Sportswriter, columnist, author, TV sports commentator
- Spouses: Patricia Hurd (m. 1949; died 1971) Cecilia Evers (m. 1975)
- Children: 5, including Patricia Heaton

Charles Heaton Jr. (October 22, 1917 – February 14, 2008) was an American sports news columnist, journalist, commentator, and reporter.

He worked for 50 years as a sportswriter for The Cleveland Plain Dealer in Cleveland, Ohio. He was the father of actress Patricia Heaton of Everybody Loves Raymond and The Middle. He was also the father of Michael Heaton, who was a writer and movie critic for the Cleveland Plain Dealer and served for 30 years as the newspaper's "Minister of Culture." Michael is the author of four books, and is the screenwriter for Hallmark's movie, The Christmas Heart.

Among the many awards he received during his career was the 1980 Dick McCann Memorial Award, given by the Pro Football Writers Association for distinguished reporting. After his death from pneumonia at the age of 90, the Press Club in Cleveland established the annual Chuck Heaton Award, given to a print, radio, online or television journalist "who best exemplifies the sensitivity and humility that, along with his journalism heart, were traits exhibited by Chuck Heaton during his exemplary career as a sports writer at The Plain Dealer".

== Early life and education ==
Heaton graduated from Lakewood High School in 1934 and John Carroll University in 1938. After graduation, he worked at John Carroll University as the publicity director and in 1942, he joined The Plain Dealer. He served in the United States Army from December 1942 to November 1945. He was initially a private. He served in Germany during World War II and was the recipient of the Bronze Star Medal.

== Bibliography ==
- A Fond Look Back At Five Decades of Football from a Legendary Cleveland Sportswriter, by Chuck Heaton, ISBN 978-1-59851-043-0, Gray & Co., Publishing, 2007.
- The Cleveland Browns: Power and Glory, ISBN 0-13-136754-4, Prentice-Hall Publishing, 1974.
