= King Covered Bridge =

- U.S. National Register of Historic Places
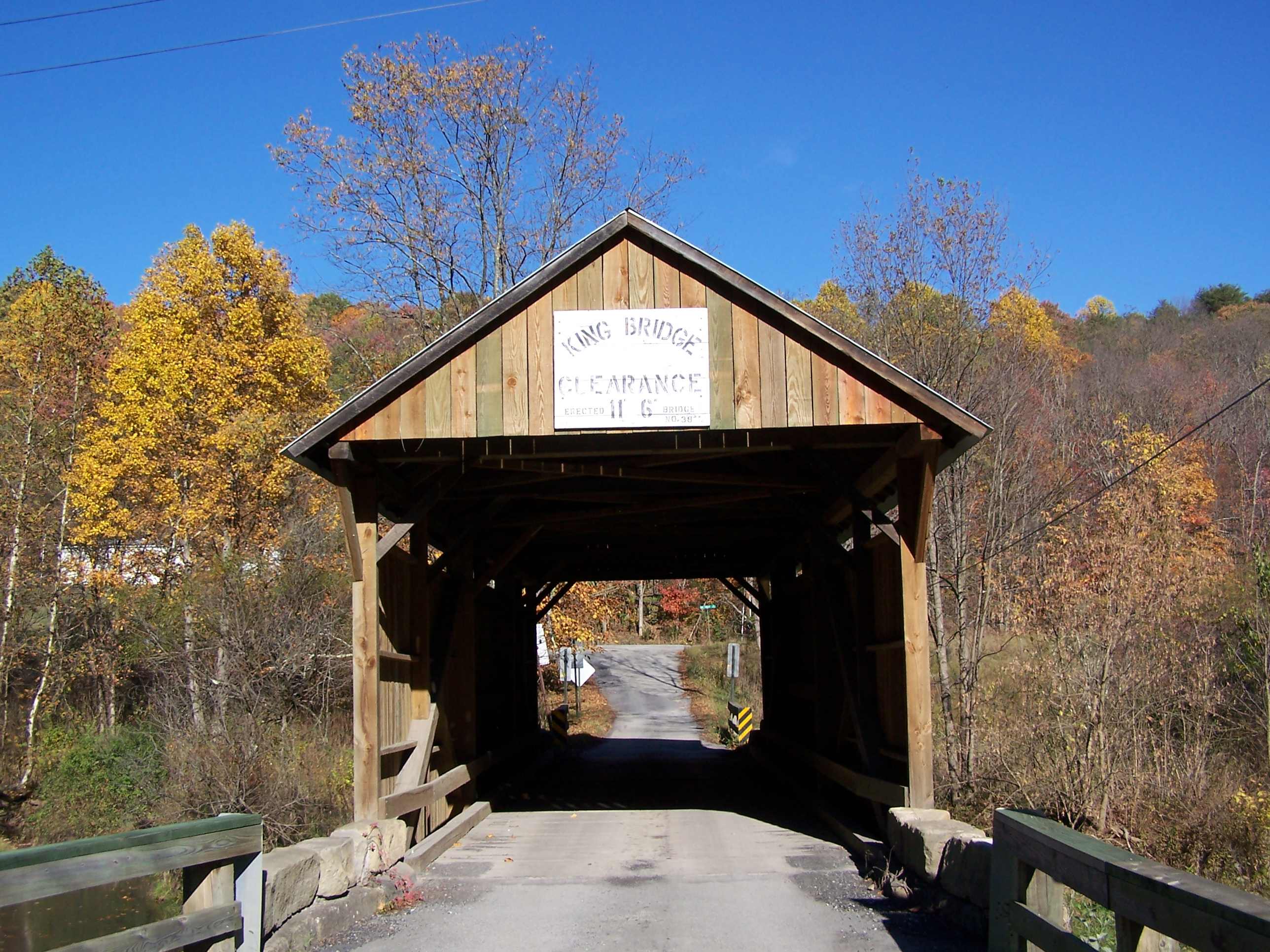
- King Covered Bridge, October 2007

- Location within Pennsylvania Location within the United States
- Location: South of Kuhntown at the crossing of Hoover Run, Wayne Township, Pennsylvania
- Coordinates: 39.75704°N 80.27259°W
- Area: 0.1 acres (0.040 ha)
- Architectural style: Queenpost truss
- MPS: Covered Bridges of Washington and Greene Counties TR
- NRHP reference No.: 79003816
- Added to NRHP: June 22, 1979

King Covered Bridge is a historic wooden covered bridge located at Wayne Township in Greene County, Pennsylvania. It is a 46.5-foot-long (14.2 m), Queenpost truss bridge with a tin covered gable roof. It crosses the Hoover Run. As of October 1978, it was one of nine historic covered bridges in Greene County.

It was listed on the National Register of Historic Places in 1979.
