= Todd Tamanend Clark =

American singer-songwriter

- Born: August 10, 1952 (age 73); Greensboro, Pennsylvania, U.S.
- Genres: Avant-garde, psychedelic rock, jazz fusion, electronic, industrial, experimental rock, Native American
- Occupations: Singer-songwriter, musician, author, composer, poet
- Instruments: Voice, vocoder, theremin, synthesizer, sampler, combo organ, prepared piano, electric violin, electric guitar, bass pedals, drum machine, electronic drum, percussion, flute, ocarina
- Years active: 1974–present
- Labels: Deathguard, World Theater, Jeree, TMI, Primal Pulse, Anopheles

Todd Tamanend Clark (born Todd Clark; August 10, 1952) is an American poet, composer, multi-instrumentalist, cultural historian, author, artist, and activist. He is known for "his musical blend of Native American heritage, glam fashion consciousness, cyberpunk attitude, and lyrical approach to scientific and sociological subjects."

== Biography ==
Clark was born on August 10, 1952, in Greensboro, Pennsylvania, to Frederick Leland Clark (1923–2003) and Hope Ramona Harvey (1925–2001). Author Adrienne Mayor describes him as being Seneca and Lenape. He graduated from Waynesburg Central High School in 1970 and from Slippery Rock University of Pennsylvania with a B.A. in Communication in 1983. He then went on to graduate school at Indiana University of Pennsylvania studying art and anthropology.

In 1975, he started to record music under the alias The Stars. Two years later, he formed the Butler, Pennsylvania based rock band The Eyes. The band's album, New Gods: Aardvark Through Zymurgy was released in 1977 and has been called "the holy grail of psychedelic collectibles." In 1978, The Eyes (with two personnel changes) evolved into The Todd Clark Group, who released their "We're Not Safe!" album in 1979.

In the early 1980s, he mutated his psychedelic rock style into a more electronic music-oriented sound. The "Secret Sinema" and "Flame Over Philadelphia" singles, which were released in 1980 and 1985 respectively, became college radio hits. In 1984, Clark released Into The Vision, which featured appearances from Allen Ravenstine of Pere Ubu and Cheetah Chrome of The Dead Boys, as well as a sample of Beat Generation author William S. Burroughs. During this time, he immersed himself more deeply into his Native American heritage, adopting the middle name "Tamanend", which is what his grandfather called him as a child. In between 1986 and 1999, he stopped releasing new material and devoted his time to his children, although he continued to compose music and perform at occasional concerts.

Between 2000 and 2004, Clark released three interrelated instrumental albums: Owls In Obsidian (2000), Staff, Mask, Rattle (2002), and Monongahela Riverrun (2004). In 2005, his first decade of recordings was collected chronologically on the double-disc compilation album, Nova Psychedelia, through Anopheles Records. In 2014, he released a complexly orchestrated darkly psychedelic cyberpunk album Dancing Through The Side Worlds, which contains many autobiographical songs. The front cover features a painting of Clark shapeshifting into an owl by Steven Johnson Leyba. Clark released a thematically related follow-up album Whirlwind Of The Whispering Worlds in 2020. The two albums combine to make a four-disc set.

A photograph of his son, X Tecumseh Clark (born October 7, 1984), was featured on the cover art of Canadian electronic music band Crystal Castles' second eponymous album in 2010.

Another of his five sons, Sachem Orenda Clark (born February 21, 1988), has his own solo career as a multi-instrumentalist and also plays guitar on some of his father's albums.

Clark has resided in Fayette County, Pennsylvania, since January 1992.

== Political activism ==
While an art school student in San Francisco, Clark was friends with Wilma Mankiller and participated in the Native American occupation of Alcatraz Island.

== Literary style ==
Despite playing a multitude of musical instruments, Clark is first and foremost a poet. He even considers his instrumental songs to be tone poems. Poetically, he was influenced by Allen Ginsberg, Leonard Cohen, Buffy Sainte-Marie, Jim Morrison, and Patti Smith. His poetry is regarded with much more complexity than what is typically usually found in rock music. In a 2006 review, Julian Cope called him "the T.S. Eliot of his time." Clark also writes essays on Native American cultures and civil rights.

== Musical style ==
Clark's music in the 1970s was described as "electro-psychedelic glam-rock" and "unique fusion of wild 60s-style experimentalism and proto-new wave synth-freakery." His early influences included the 1960s psychedelic rock of The Mothers Of Invention, The Doors, The Electric Prunes, Jimi Hendrix, and especially the early adopters of analog synthesizers such as The United States of America, Lothar and the Hand People, and Silver Apples, while he was also attuned to the sounds of the proto punk rock scene, such as The Seeds, The Music Machine, The Velvet Underground, The MC5, and The Stooges.

In the 1980s, he switched to an experimental rock sound, taking inspirations from artists like The Residents and Laurie Anderson and the works of science fiction, cyberpunk and stream-of-consciousness writers such as Harlan Ellison and William S. Burroughs. He was also inspired by comic books, most prominently by Turok and Doctor Strange, but also by Batman, Green Arrow, The Haunt of Fear, Shock SuspenStories, Strange Tales, Strange Adventures, Challengers of the Unknown, Adam Strange, The Doom Patrol, Animal Man, Swamp Thing, Love and Rockets, Coyote, Aztec Ace, and Scout, as well as 1950s monster movies, most prominently by Forbidden Planet and Creature From the Black Lagoon, but also by It Came From Outer Space, Terror From the Year 5000, The Flame Barrier, Kronos, Invasion of the Body Snatchers, and Attack of the 50 Foot Woman.

== Music Equipment ==
=== Synthesizers ===
ARP 2600, ARP Avatar, ARP Quadra, ARP Odyssey, Ashun Sound Machines Hydrasynth Deluxe, Dave Smith Instruments Pro 2, Dave Smith Instruments Prophet '08, Dave Smith Instruments Prophet Rev2-16, E-mu Emulator II+HD, E-mu Emax, E-mu E-Synth, E-mu Morpheus, E-mu Orbit, E-mu Planet Earth, E-mu Vintage Keys, E-mu Xtreme Lead-1, Ensoniq MR-61, Ensoniq MR-Rack, Ensoniq TS-10, Hammond 102200, Korg Kronos 2–88, Maestro Theremin, Moog Etherwave Plus Theremin, Moog Memorymoog Plus, Moog Micromoog, Moog Minimoog Model D, Moog Minimoog Voyager, Moog Polymoog 203A, Moog Taurus 1, Moog Taurus 3, Oberheim Matrix-1000, Oberheim Xpander, Sequential Circuits Prophet-5

=== Guitars and Violins ===
Ampeg Dan Armstrong, B.C. Rich Warlock USA seven-string, Ernie Ball Music Man Saint Vincent, Fender Jaguar, Fender Stratocaster, Fender Tom Morello Stratocaster, Gibson SG Gothic, NS Design NXTa (fretted electric violin), Parker Fly Deluxe Vibrato, Paul Reed Smith Custom 24, Reverend Reeves Gabrels Spacehawk, Rickenbacker 360 twelve-string, Steinberger GL2S, Steinberger GM5T

=== Amplifiers ===
Fender Twin Reverb, Gallien-Krueger 200GT, Johnson Millennium Stereo One-Fifty, Magnatone M35, Rocktron Taboo 100

=== Effects ===
Catalinbread Antichthon, Catalinbread Belle Epoch Deluxe, Catalinbread Bicycle Delay, Catalinbread Fuzzrite, Chase Bliss Warped Vinyl, Death By Audio Evil Filter, Death By Audio Ghost Delay, Death By Audio Rooms, DigiTech DigiDelay, DigiTech DigiVerb, DigiTech Hyper Phase, DigiTech Metal Master, DigiTech Synth Wah, DigiTech Turbo Flange, DigiTech Whammy, DOD Gonkulator, Dunlop Crybaby From Hell, Earthquaker Levitation, Electro-Harmonix Synth9, Electro-Harmonix Talking Wah, Ensoniq DP/2, Ensoniq DP/4+, Ensoniq DP Pro, Eventide H90 Dark, Fender Shields Blender, Fender The Pinwheel, Hardwire Delay/Looper, Hardwire Metal Distortion, Hardwire Stereo Chorus, Hardwire Stereo Phaser, Hardwire Stereo Reverb, Hardwire Supernatural, Hardwire Tremolo/Rotary, Keeley Caverns, Keeley Compressor Plus, Keeley Mesmer, Keeley Monterey, Line 6 DL4 MkII, Maestro Echoplex, Maestro Phase Shifter, Maestro Ring Modulator, Malekko Charlie Foxtrot, Malekko Downer, Malekko Scrutator, Malekko Sneak Attack, Mister Black Downward Spiral, Moog Minifooger Chorus, Moog Minifooger Delay, Moog Minifooger Drive, Moog Minifooger Flange, Moog Minifooger Ring, Moog Minifooger Trem, Moog Moogerfooger Analog Delay, Moog Moogerfooger Cluster Flux, Moog Moogerfooger FreqBox, Moog Moogerfooger Lowpass Filter, Moog Moogerfooger MIDI Murf, Moog Moogerfooger Ring Modulator, Moog Moogerfooger Twelve-Step Phaser, Moog Vocoder, Morley Bad Horsie, Morley Echo-Chorus-Vibrato, Morley Little Alligator, Morley Skeleton Wah, Mu-Tron Bi-Phase, MXR Digital Delay, MXR Pitch Transposer, Rivera Metal Shaman, Seymour Duncan Andromeda, Seymour Duncan Shape Shifter, SubDecay Harmonic Antagonizer, SubDecay Vitruvian Mod, SubDecay Vocawah

=== Percussion ===
All One Tribe Hand Drum, E-mu Pro/cussion, Linn Linndrum, Native American handmade rattles, Pollard Syndrums Quad, Rhythm Tech Maracas, Rhythm Tech Rainmakers, Rhythm Tech Shakers, Roland SPD-SX-Pro Sampling Pad, Roland TD-50KV2 V-Drums, Taos Hand Drum

=== Woodwinds ===
Mayan Clay Flute, Mayan Ocarina, Orion's Gate Double Chamber Wood Flute, Stellar Single Chamber Wood Flute

== Discography ==
=== Studio albums ===
- A Deathguard Sampler (1976)
- New Gods: Aardvark Through Zymurgy (1977)
- We're Not Safe (1979)
- Into The Vision (1984)
- Owls In Obsidian (2000)
- Staff, Mask, Rattle (2002)
- Monongahela Riverrun (2004)
- Owls In Obsidian: Magma Mix (2012)
- Dancing Through The Side Worlds (2014)
- Whirlwind Of The Whispering Worlds (2020)
- Isolation Quotient (2021)

=== Compilations ===
- Nova Psychedelia (2005)
- The Deathguard Remnants (2014)
- Nova Psychedelia: Special Edition (2016)
- Poetic Electricity (2020)

=== Singles ===
- "Flame Over Africa" b/w "2000 Light Years From Home" (1975)
- "Secret Sinema" b/w "Nightlife Of The New Gods" (1980)
- "Flame Over Philadelphia" b/w "Oceans Of She" (1985)
- "Rise Up Dancing" (2020)
- "Mushrooms Of Thunder" (2021)
