= Wayne Township, Greene County, Pennsylvania =

Township in Pennsylvania, US

Coordinates: 39°47′00″N 80°13′59″W

- Township
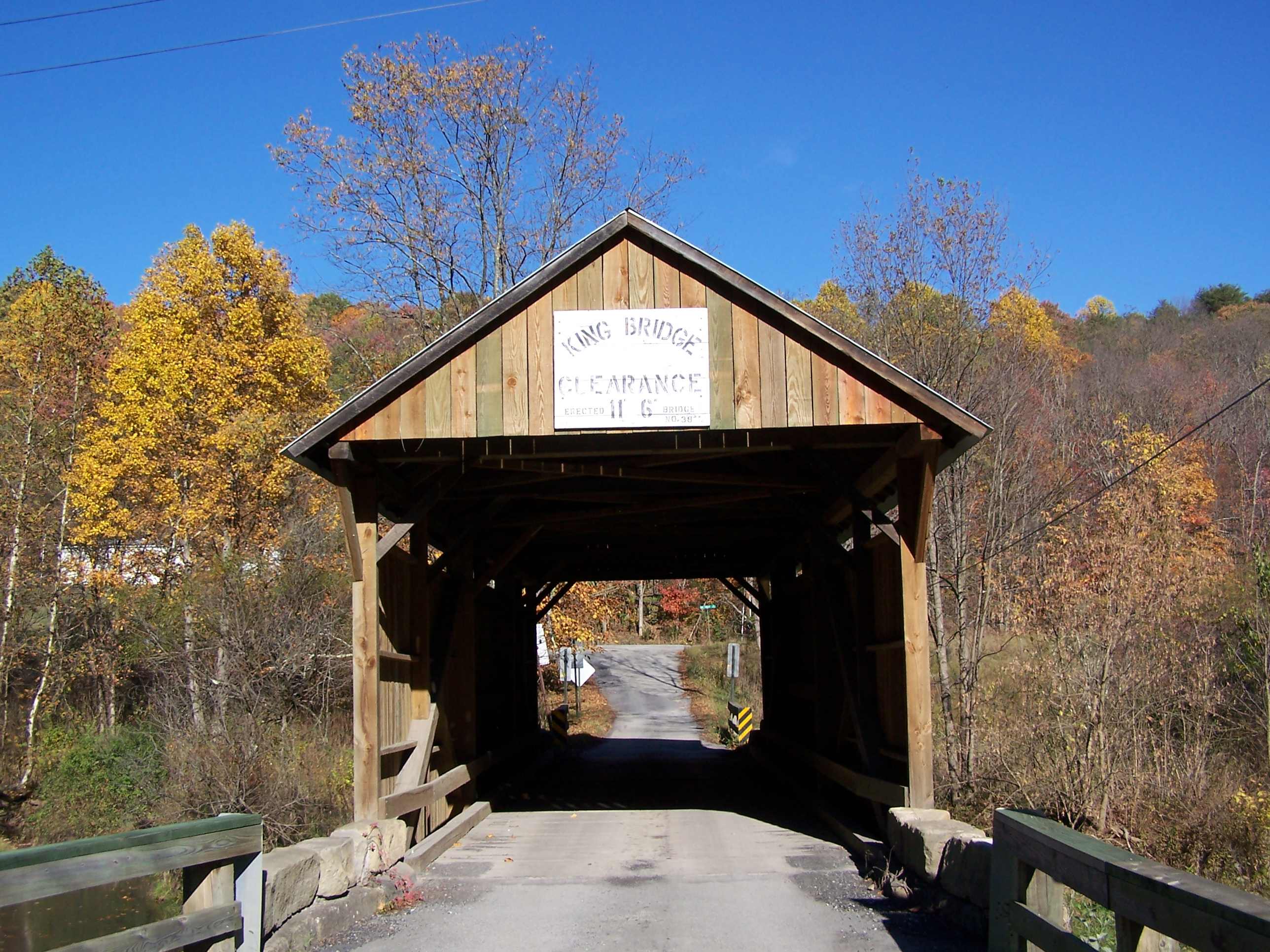
- King Covered Bridge (1890); National Register of Historic Places

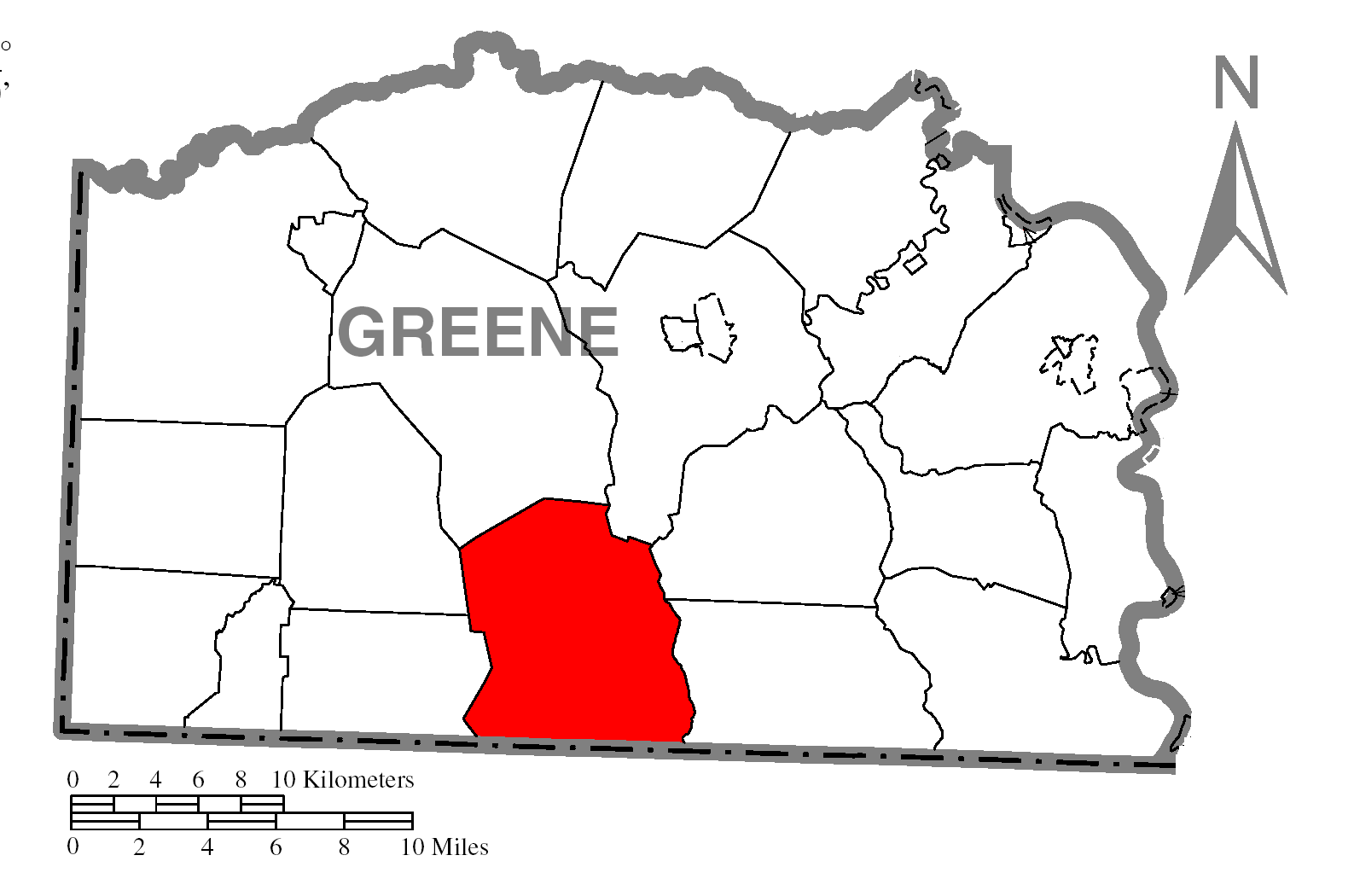
- Location of Wayne Township in Greene County

- Location of Greene County in Pennsylvania
- Country: United States
- State: Pennsylvania
- County: Greene

Area
  - Total: 39.29 sq mi (101.75 km^{2})
  - Land: 39.24 sq mi (101.64 km^{2})
  - Water: 0.039 sq mi (0.10 km^{2})

Population (2020)
  - Total: 1,026 ▼
  - Estimate (2023): 1,012
  - Density: 30.0/sq mi (11.59/km^{2})
- Time zone: UTC-4 (EST)
  - Summer (DST): UTC-5 (EDT)
- Area code: 724
- FIPS code: 42-059-81768

Wayne Township is a township that is located in Greene County, Pennsylvania, United States. The population was 1,026 at the time of the 2020 census.

== History ==
The King Covered Bridge and Ernest Thralls House are listed on the National Register of Historic Places. The township was the site of the highly publicized murder of West Virginia teenager Skylar Neese on July 6, 2012.

== Geography ==
Wayne Township is located in south-central Greene County and is bordered to the south by Monongalia County, West Virginia. According to the United States Census Bureau, the township has a total area of 39.3 square miles (101.7 km^{2}), of which 39.2 square miles (101.6 km^{2}) are land and 0.04 square miles (0.1 km^{2}), or 0.10%, are water.

Unincorporated communities in the township include Rush Crossroads, Kuhntown, Spraggs, Brock, and Brave, the primary settlement. The town of Blacksville, West Virginia, borders part of the southern edge of the township.

== Demographics ==
Historical population
Census	Pop.	Note	%±
2000	1,223		—
2010	1,197		−2.1%
2020	1,026		−14.3%
2025 (est.)	1,009		−1.7%
U.S. Decennial Census

As of the census of 2000, there were 1,223 people, 465 households, and 344 families residing in the township.

The population density was 31.0 inhabitants per square mile (12.0/km^{2}). There were 536 housing units at an average density of 13.6/sq mi (5.2/km^{2}).

The racial makeup of the township was 99.02% White, 0.33% African American, 0.33% Native American, 0.08% Asian, and 0.25% from two or more races. Hispanic or Latino of any race were 0.90% of the population.

There were 465 households, out of which 31.8% had children under the age of eighteen living with them, 61.5% were married couples living together, 8.4% had a female householder with no husband present, and 26.0% were non-families. Out of all of the households that were documented, 21.1% were made up of individuals, and 9.2% had someone living alone who was sixty-five years of age or older.

The average household size was 2.63 and the average family size was 3.04.

Within the township, the population was spread out, with 25.8% of residents who were under the age of 18, 6.5% from 18 to 24, 27.6% from 25 to 44, 28.0% from 45 to 64, and 12.0% who were 65 years of age or older. The median age was 38 years.

For every one hundred females, there were 102.8 males. For every one hundred females who were aged eighteen or older, there were 98.9 males.

The median income for a household in the township was $29,950, and the median income for a family was $35,625. Males had a median income of $32,727 compared with that of $21,528 for females.

The per capita income for the township was $14,296.

Approximately 13.3% of families and 13.8% of the population were living below the poverty line, including 14.1% of those who were under the age of eighteen and 7.5% of those who were aged sixty-five or older.

== Education ==
The school district which serves this township is Central Greene School District.
