= Ernest Thralls House =

Historic house in Pennsylvania, United States

- U.S. National Register of Historic Places
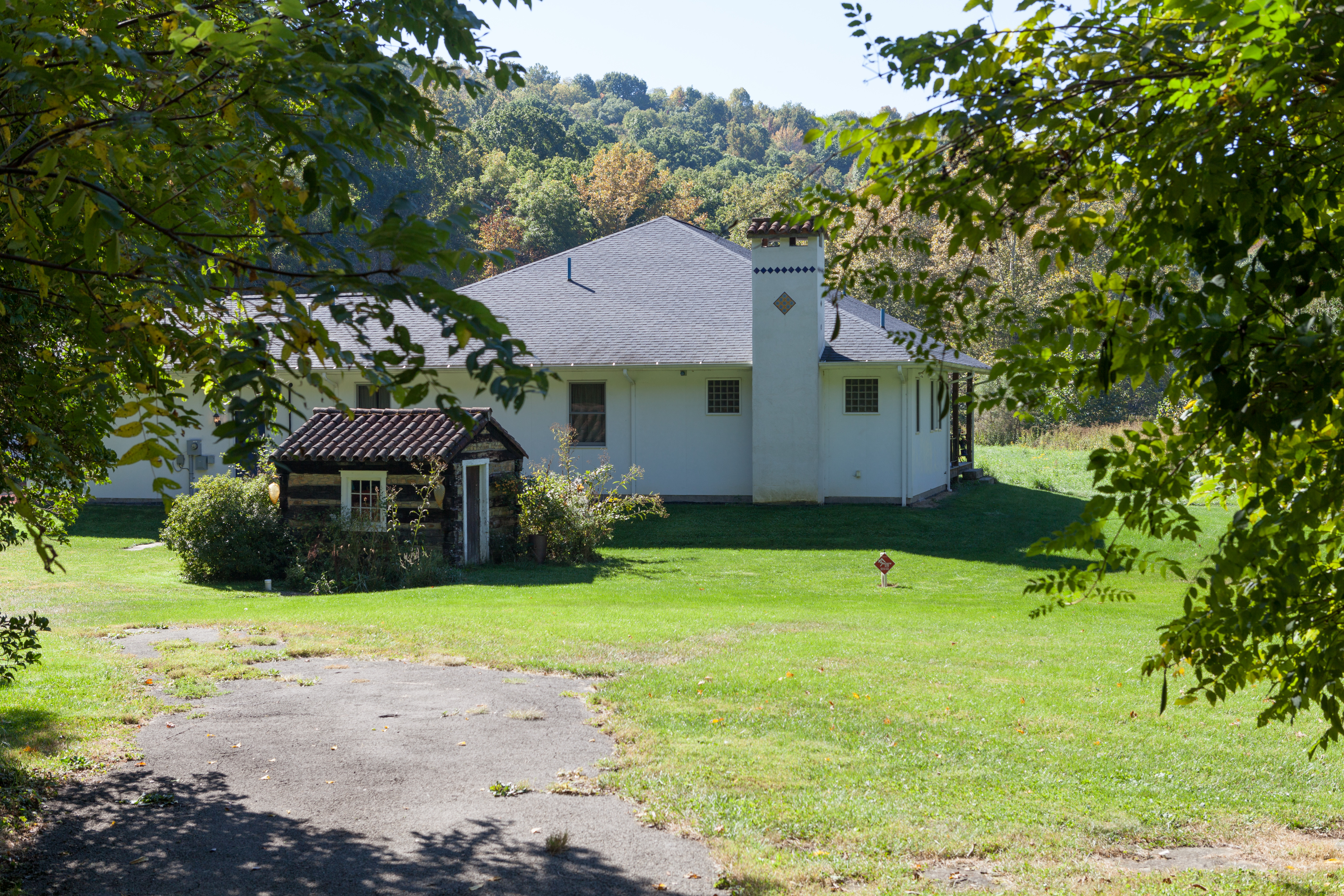
- The new house in September 2014, built just behind the location of the original house

- Location within Pennsylvania Location within the United States
- Location: PA 218 S at TR 353 and TR 522, Wayne Township, Pennsylvania
- Coordinates: 39°45′13″N 80°13′03″W
- Area: 9 acres (3.6 ha)
- Built: 1939-1940
- Built by: Thralls, Ernest
- Architectural style: Mission/spanish Revival
- NRHP reference No.: 99000513
- Added to NRHP: May 12, 1999

Ernest Thralls House was a historic home located at Wayne Township in Greene County, Pennsylvania. The house was built in 1939–1940, and is a 2 1/2-story, concrete block dwelling in the Spanish Revival-style. It measures 64 feet wide and 51 feet deep, and has terraces on the front and rear. Also on the property are a contributing tenant house (c. 1940), three sheds, a horse barn, open sheep shed, pig shed, and chicken coop.

The house was demolished several years after it was damaged in 2000 by subsidence caused by Consol Energy's Blacksville No. 2 longwall mine. A new one story house now sits near the site of the previous house.

The Ernest Thralls House was listed on the National Register of Historic Places in 1999.
