= David Hunt (actor) =

English actor, producer, and director

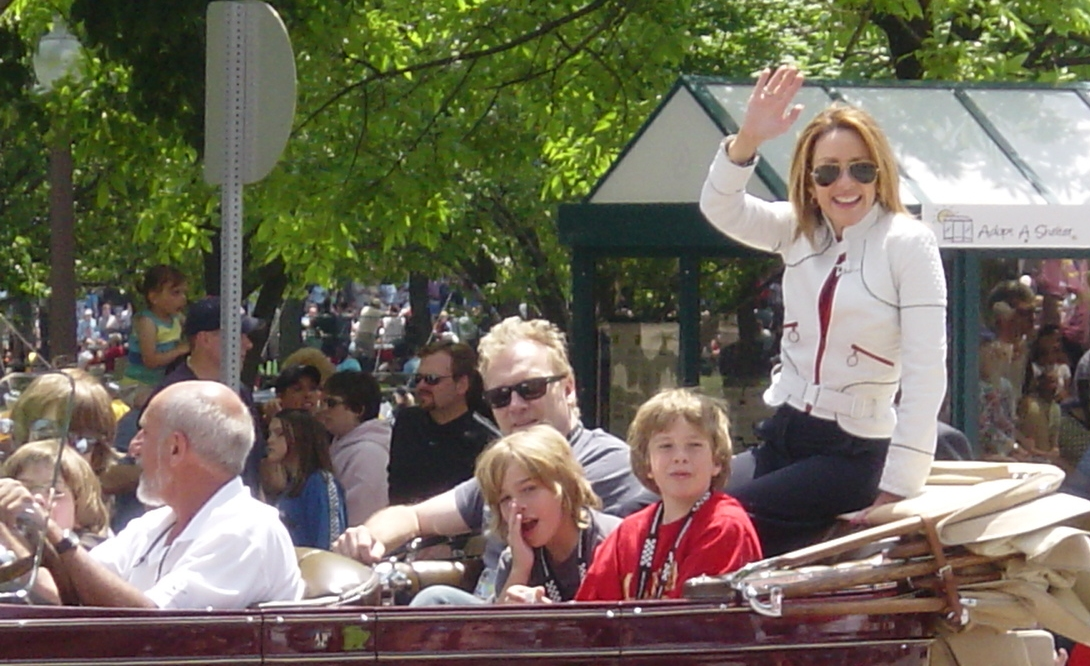
- Hunt (back centre) with his family in 2008
- Born: London, England
- Occupations: Actor, producer, director
- Years active: 1988–present
- Spouse: Patricia Heaton (m. 1990)
- Children: 4

David Hunt is an English actor, producer, and director who has worked in both the United Kingdom and the United States. His best known U.S. film role is Harlan Rook, in the 1988 action film The Dead Pool, the fifth installment in the Dirty Harry series. He has also had guest roles on the television sitcom Everybody Loves Raymond as Ray's nemesis neighbor, Bill Parker. He also appeared in the recurring role of Darren McCarthy during season 6 of 24. Back in the UK, Hunt was in the 1991 award-winning period drama, The Black Velvet Gown, as well as being a regular cast member of the series Beck for the BBC.

In 2005, Hunt directed the documentary The Bituminous Coal Queens of Pennsylvania, which won a Crystal Heart Award at the Heartland Film Festival. Other film appearances include The Deal with William H. Macy, Meg Ryan and Jason Ritter and Moms' Night Out.

Amongst Hunt's productions are the romantic comedy The Engagement Ring, a two-hour movie for TNT in which he also starred; Amazing Grace, a motion picture directed by Michael Apted and starring Albert Finney; and the television comedy Versailles, which he directed.

== Biography ==
Hunt graduated from Loughborough University, Leicestershire. He worked as a schoolteacher and American football coach before moving to New York City. Hunt graduated from the Juilliard School in New York. In 2001, he founded a production company, Four Boys Entertainment, with his wife, American actress Patricia Heaton. They have four sons and they divide their time between Los Angeles and Cambridge. In 2019, Broti Gupta, a writer on Hunt's wife's television show Carol's Second Act, complained that David Hunt had inappropriate contact with her, a claim which Hunt and his lawyer denied. Gupta and another writer subsequently left the show and Hunt underwent work harassment sensitivity training.

== Filmography ==
=== Film ===
- 1988 Closing Ranks as Platoon Commander Albert Thom
- 1988 The Dead Pool as Harlan Rook
- 1989 Nasty Boys as Dale Lofton
- 1991 The Black Velvet Gown as Laurence Gallmington
- 1992 Just Like a Woman as Police Officer #1
- 1993 Trip nach Tunis as Howard Ingham
- 1995 Jade as Detective Pat Callendar
- 2001 Murder on the Orient Express as Bob Arbuthnot
- 2004 Bobby Jones: Stroke of Genius as Dr. Begg (uncredited)
- 2006 Amazing Grace as Lord Camden
- 2008 The Deal as Grier Clark
- 2008 Justice League: The New Frontier as Harry (voice)
- 2012 Liz & Dick as Ifor Jenkins
- 2014 Moms' Night Out as Cabbie
- 2017 Kepler's Dream as Abercrombie
- 2025 Merv as Jack Owens

=== Television ===
- 1988 Sonny Spoon (1 episode) as Atlas
- 1995 The Client (1 episode) as Tom Halstead
- 1998–2002 Everybody Loves Raymond (3 episodes) as Bill Parker
- 2005 Numb3rs (1 episode) as Elliot Cole
- 2005 Monk (1 episode) as Michael Norfleet
- 2007 24 (4 episodes) as Darren McCarthy
- 2011 Castle (1 episode) as Falco
- 2012 Mad Men (episode: "Signal 30") as Edwin Baker
- 2015 Transformers: Robots in Disguise as Chop Shop (voice)
