= Patricia Heaton =

American actress (born 1958)

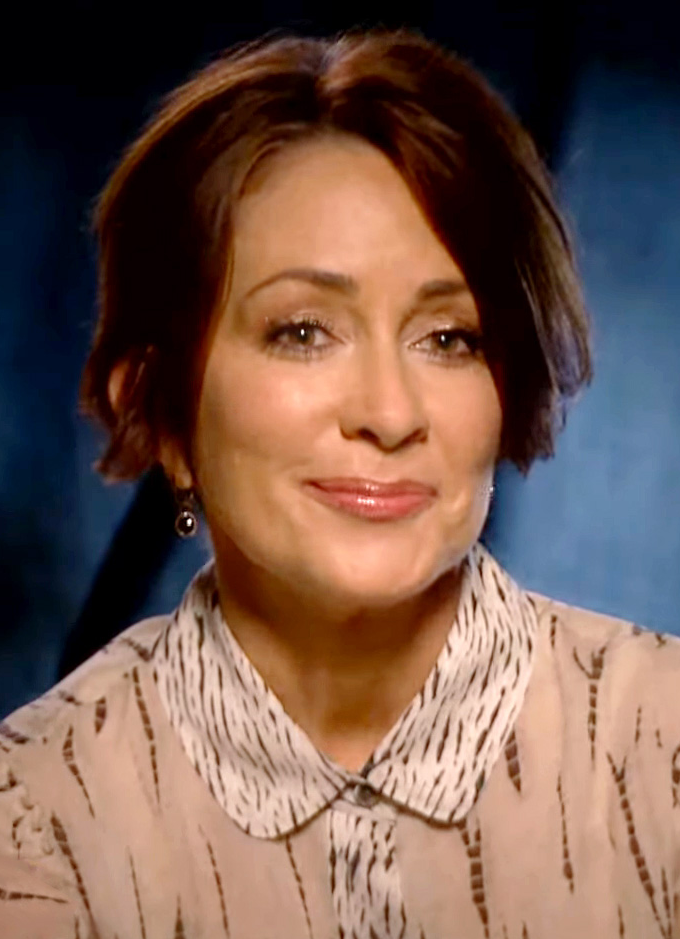
- Heaton in 2011
- Born: Patricia Helen Heaton; March 4, 1958 (age 68); Bay Village, Ohio, U.S.
- Education: Ohio State University (BA)
- Occupations: Actress; producer
- Years active: 1983–present
- Television: Everybody Loves Raymond; The Middle
- Spouse(s): Constantine Yankoglu (m. 1984; div. 1987) David Hunt (m. 1990)
- Children: 4
- Father: Chuck Heaton

Patricia Helen Heaton (born March 4, 1958) is an American actress. Heaton achieved her career breakthrough and global fame with her portrayal of Debra Barone in the CBS sitcom Everybody Loves Raymond (1996–2005). She began her career appearing in a recurring role in the ABC drama series Thirtysomething (1989–1991) and later appearing in the comedy films Memoirs of an Invisible Man and Beethoven (both 1992). Heaton went on to star in the short-lived sitcoms Room for Two (1992–93), Someone Like Me (1994) and Women of the House (1995).

Her Raymond performance earned her seven nominations for the Primetime Emmy Award for Outstanding Lead Actress in a Comedy Series, winning the award in 2000 and 2001. She received five nominations for a Screen Actors Guild Award for Outstanding Performance by a Female Actor in a Comedy Series as well and won Outstanding Performance by an Ensemble in a Comedy Series in 2003. She also played the leading roles in the made-for-television movies A Town Without Christmas (2001), The Goodbye Girl (2004) for which she received Screen Actors Guild Award nomination for Outstanding Performance by a Female Actor in a Miniseries or Television Movie, and Front of the Class (2008).

From 2009 to 2018, Heaton starred as Frances "Frankie" Heck in the ABC comedy series The Middle for which she received Critics' Choice Television Award nomination for Best Actress in a Comedy Series. She hosted and produced Food Network cooking series Patricia Heaton Parties (2015–16), winning a Daytime Emmy Award for Outstanding Culinary Program.

== Early life ==
Patricia Heaton was born in Bay Village, Ohio, the daughter of Patricia (née Hurd) and Chuck Heaton, who was a sportswriter for The Plain Dealer. When she was 12, her mother died of an aneurysm. The fourth of five children, Heaton was raised as a devout Catholic.

Heaton has three sisters, Sharon, Alice, and Frances, and one brother, Michael, who died in September 2022 at the age of 66 and was the "Minister of Culture" columnist for The Plain Dealer and a writer for the paper's Friday Magazine.

== Career ==
=== Early career (1980s–1995) ===
While attending Ohio State University, she became a sister of Delta Gamma sorority. She later graduated with a Bachelor of Arts in drama. In 1980, Heaton moved to New York City to study with drama teacher William Esper. Heaton made her first Broadway appearance in the chorus of Don't Get God Started (1987), after which she and fellow students created Stage Three, an off-Broadway acting troupe.

Heaton auditioned for the role of Elaine Benes on Seinfeld in 1989. When Stage Three brought one of its productions to Los Angeles, Heaton caught the eye of a casting director for the ABC drama series Thirtysomething. She was cast as an oncologist, leading to six appearances on the series from 1989 to 1991. Other guest appearances include Alien Nation (1989) and Matlock (1990) and supporting role in the made-for-television movie Shattered Dreams (1990).

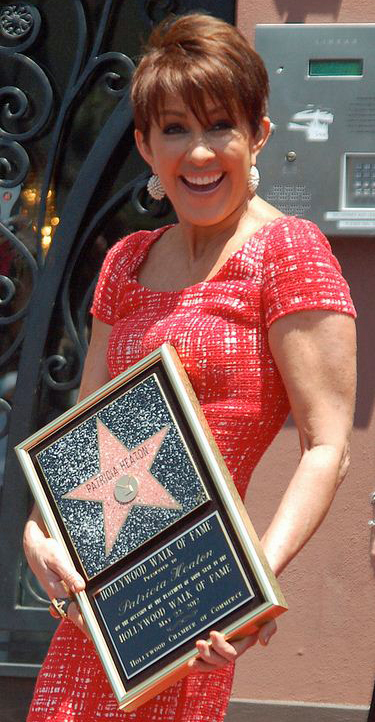
Heaton at her Hollywood Walk of Fame ceremony on May 22, 2012

In 1992, Heaton made her big screen debut appearing in a supporting role in the comedy-drama film Memoirs of an Invisible Man directed by John Carpenter. Later that year, she appeared in the box-office hit family comedy film Beethoven. From 1992 to 1993, Heaton starred as a lead character in the ABC sitcom Room for Two. The series was canceled after two seasons. In 1994, she starred in another short-lived sitcom, Someone Like Me, it lasted on NBC only six episodes. Later that year, Heaton appeared in the comedy-drama film The New Age. In 1995, she starred opposite Delta Burke in the CBS sitcom Women of the House, a spin-off of Designing Women. The series also was canceled after one season.

=== 1996–2018: Everybody Loves Raymond and The Middle ===
In 1996, Heaton landed the role of Debra Barone in the CBS sitcom Everybody Loves Raymond opposite Ray Romano. The series received positive reviews and has been on top ten television rankings and won Primetime Emmy Award for Outstanding Comedy Series twice. She was nominated in each of the series' last seven seasons for the Primetime Emmy Award for Outstanding Lead Actress in a Comedy Series, winning in 2000 and 2001. With her win in 2000, she became the first of the cast members on the show to win an Emmy. She has also collected two Viewers for Quality Television Awards for Best Actress in a Quality Comedy Series and a Screen Actors Guild trophy for Outstanding Performance by an Ensemble in a Comedy Series and five Screen Actors Guild Award for Outstanding Performance by a Female Actor in a Comedy Series nominations for her work on the series. The series ended in 2005 after nine seasons.

While starring on Everybody Loves Raymond, Heaton played the leading roles in a number of made-for-television movies. In 1997 she starred alongside Meredith Baxter and Della Reese in the drama film Miracle in the Woods. In 2001, she starred in the Christmas drama A Town Without Christmas. In 2004, she starred in the comedy-drama The Goodbye Girl, a remake of the 1977 film of the same name. For her performance, Heaton received Screen Actors Guild Award nomination for Outstanding Performance by a Female Actor in a Miniseries or Television Movie. In 2005, she starred in and produced the romantic comedy-drama film The Engagement Ring.

In 2003, Heaton appeared in a series of television and radio commercials as spokesperson for the various incarnations of the grocery chain Albertsons, such as Acme, Jewel and Shaw's. Heaton also was featured on the cover of the company's 2003 and 2004 annual reports. In 2007, Albertsons created the Crazy About Food slogan/campaign and Heaton's association with the company ended. She has also appeared in advertisements for Pantene hair-care products. Heaton was the producer for the 2005 documentary The Bituminous Coal Queens of Pennsylvania, which was directed by her husband, David Hunt. She was also one of the producers of the William Wilberforce drama Amazing Grace (2006).

In 2006, Heaton played United States Ambassador Barbara Bodine in the controversial miniseries The Path to 9/11 about the 1993 World Trade Center bombing in New York City and the events leading up to the September 11, 2001, terrorist attacks. Also that year, she starred in and produced the untitled ABC comedy pilot about a widowed mother who joins the P.T.A. where she befriends two women she initially dislikes. In January 2007, Heaton returned to the stage to co-star with Tony Shalhoub in the off-Broadway play The Scene at Second Stage Theatre in New York City. For this performance, Heaton was nominated in the Outstanding Lead Actress category for the 22nd Lucille Lortel Awards. From 2007 to 2008, she starred with Kelsey Grammer in the Fox comedy series, Back to You. The show about squabbling anchors of a news program was canceled in May 2008. For her performance, she was nominated for the Satellite Award for Best Actress – Television Series Musical or Comedy at the 10th Satellite Awards. In 2008, she starred in the Hallmark Hall of Fame movie Front of the Class, based on the real story of a mother, Ellen Cohen, raising a son, Brad Cohen, who has Tourette syndrome.

In 2009, Heaton began starring as Frankie Heck in the ABC comedy series, The Middle. The series received positive reviews from critics and lasted nine seasons with 215 produced episodes. She received Critics' Choice Television Award nomination for Critics' Choice Television Award for Best Actress in a Comedy Series in 2011. In 2011, Heaton was ranked at number 24 on the TV Guide Network special, Funniest Women on TV. She received a star on the Hollywood Walk of Fame on May 22, 2012. Her production company is FourBoys Entertainment. She starred in and produced the 2014 comedy film Moms' Night Out. The film was released by Sony Pictures Releasing on May 9, 2014, receiving mostly negative reviews from critics.

In October 2015, Heaton began hosting Patricia Heaton Parties, a cooking show on Food Network. The program showcases party-friendly foods and home-entertaining tips. The series won a Daytime Emmy Award in 2016 for Outstanding Culinary Program. The show ended after two seasons. She also did voice over work in the animated films The Star (2017) and Smallfoot (2018).

=== 2019–present ===
In 2019, Heaton returned to television with the CBS comedy series, Carol's Second Act. The series received average reviews from critics, but her performance was praised. Carol's Second Act was canceled after single season in 2020. Heaton wrote a book called Your Second Act: Inspiring Stories of Transformation with a release date of July 21, 2020. The following year, it was announced that Heaton began producing her new sitcom for Fox. Two years later it was announced that Heaton will star as the host of an upscale lifestyle show, sent to prison for embezzlement and tax evasion. She gets out after two years, forgotten and broke, and moves to Tennessee to live with her estranged sister.

In 2022, Heaton starred opposite Brian Cox in a drama film, Mending the Line, directed by Joshua Caldwell. It received positive reviews from film critics. It received limited release on June 9, 2023. She starred in the drama film The Unbreakable Boy for Lionsgate. In 2023, she was cast in the leading role in the psychological horror-thriller film The Beldham. In 2024, she was cast for a recurring role during the second season of Paramount+ series Frasier. In 2025, she starred opposite Al Pacino in the horror film The Ritual.

== Personal life ==
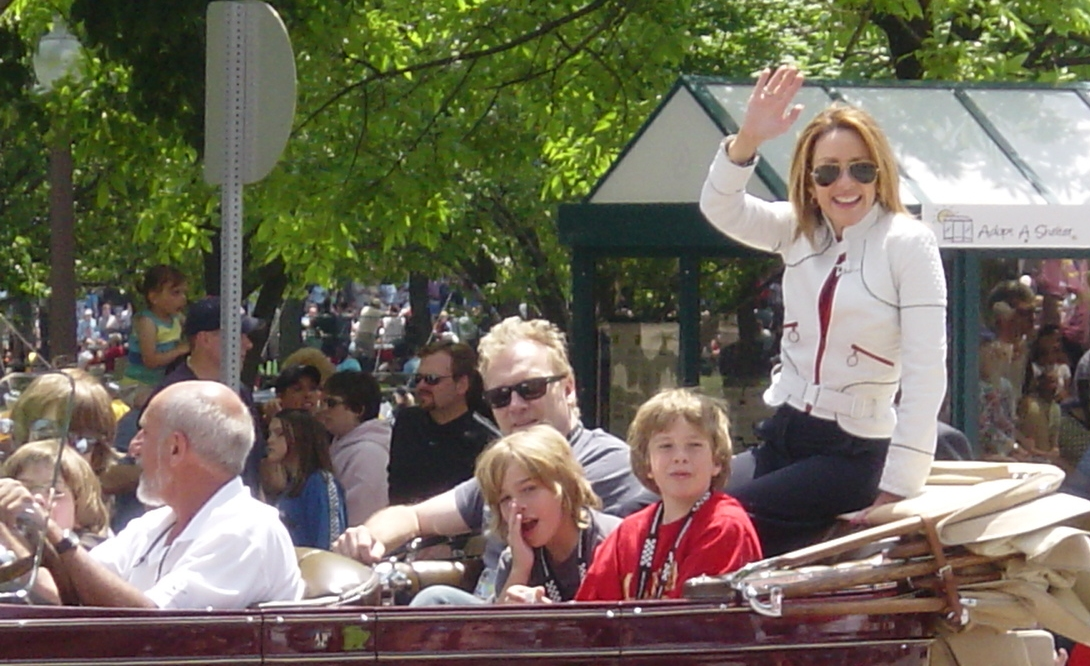
Patricia Heaton and family in the Indianapolis 500 Parade, May 2008

Heaton has been married to English actor and director David Hunt since 1990. They have four sons and as of 2002, they divided their time between Los Angeles and Cambridge. Her memoir, Motherhood and Hollywood: How to Get a Job Like Mine, was published by Villard Books in 2002.

After her divorce from her first husband, Constantine Yankoglu, she went through a self-described "Protestant wilderness". As of June 2017, Heaton's first marriage had been annulled by the Catholic Church and she has returned to being a practicing Catholic.

Heaton has been open about having plastic surgery, citing having a tummy-tuck and a breast reduction after undergoing four Caesarean sections.

In a 2020 interview for Parade, Heaton revealed that she had quit drinking two years prior.

== Activism and political views ==
Heaton's political views have been described as conservative, and until 2021, she was a registered Republican. In 2016, she voiced her disapproval of her party's then-presidential nominee Donald Trump. She later stated that she had "given up politics" following the election, but continued to express her admiration for Mitt Romney. After the January 6 United States Capitol attack, Heaton condemned the event, and announced that she would leave the Republican Party and become an independent voter. In 2025, she voiced strong support for Trump, stating that the US was on the right track and that she was looking forward to the next four years of the Trump presidency.

=== Abortion and birth control ===
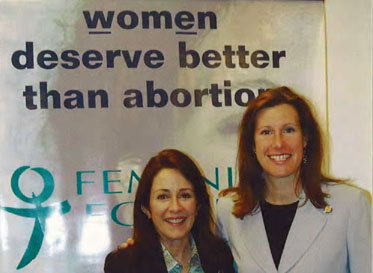
Heaton (left) with Melissa Hart at a Feminists for Life event in 2005

Heaton is a vocal anti-abortion activist and is vocally supportive of groups and causes opposing abortion, euthanasia, and the death penalty. Her advocacy became particularly visible during the debate regarding the Terri Schiavo case. In addition, Heaton is honorary chair of Feminists for Life, an organization which opposes abortion and embryonic stem cell research and supports other pro-life causes on the basis of feminism.

On February 29, 2012, Heaton criticized Georgetown University law student Sandra Fluke, who advocated in favor of a contraceptive mandate for health insurance plans. Heaton said on Twitter, "I don't care if anyone uses birth control – just don't charge me for it", and wrote a series of tweets mocking Fluke's activism, as well as retweeting similar remarks from her followers. After incurring criticism, Heaton apologized and deleted most of the posts.

=== Other views ===
In August 2006, Heaton's name was in an advertisement in the Los Angeles Times that condemned Hamas and Hezbollah and supported Israel in the 2006 Israel-Lebanon conflict. In October 2023, Heaton was a vocal supporter of Israel during the Gaza war, releasing a video in which she compared October 7 to the Holocaust during World War II, and encouraged her followers to donate through the Beth Jacob Congregation.

In October 2006, Heaton appeared in a commercial opposing a Missouri state constitutional amendment concerning embryonic stem cell research, which subsequently passed. The advertisement was a response to the election of Democratic Senate hopeful Claire McCaskill and aired at the same time as Michael J. Fox's advertisement supporting the amendment. Appearing with Heaton were actor Jim Caviezel, St. Louis Cardinals pitcher Jeff Suppan, Seattle Mariner Mike Sweeney, and St. Louis Rams/Arizona Cardinals quarterback Kurt Warner. Following a public outcry, Heaton later said she regretted doing the ad and sent an apology to Fox, saying she was unaware of his ad. Fox accepted her apology and later stated, "If we can have a healthy dialogue about issues that people see differently, that's marvelous."

== Filmography ==
=== Film ===
Year	Title	Role	Notes
1992	Memoirs of an Invisible Man	Ellen	
1992	Beethoven	Brie Wilson	
1994	The New Age	Anna	
1996	Space Jam	Woman Fan	
2006	Amazing Grace	—N/a	Producer
2014	Moms' Night Out	Sondra	Also executive producer
2017	The Star	Edith (voice)	
2018	Smallfoot	Mama Bear (voice)	
2022	Mending the Line	Dr. Burke	
2023	Unexpected	—N/a	Producer
2024	The Beldham	Sadie	
2025	The Unbreakable Boy	Marcia	
2025	The Ritual	Mother Superior	
2025	Merv	MJ Owens	

=== Television ===
List of Patricia Heaton television credits
Year	Title	Role	Notes
1989	Alien Nation	Amanda Russell	Episode: "The Red Room"
1989–1991	Thirtysomething	Dr. Silverman	Recurring role
1990	Shattered Dreams	Older Dotti	TV movie
1990	Matlock	Ellie Stanford	Episode: "The Brothers"
1991	DEA	Paula Werner	Episode: "The Fat Lady Sings Alone"
1992–1993	Room for Two	Jill Kurland	Main role
1994	Someone Like Me	Jean Stepjak	Main role
1995	Women of the House	Natalie Hollingsworth	Main role
1996	Party of Five	Robin Merrin	2 episodes
1996–2005	Everybody Loves Raymond	Debra Barone	Main role
1997	Miracle in the Woods	Wanda Briggs	TV movie
1999	The King of Queens	Debra Barone	Episode: "Dire Strayts"
2001	A Town Without Christmas	M.J. Jensen	TV movie
2004	The Goodbye Girl	Paula McFadden	TV movie
2004	Danny Phantom	Lunch Lady Ghost (voice)	Episode: "Mystery Meat"
2005	The Engagement Ring	Sara Rosa Anselmi	TV movie
2006	Untitled Patricia Heaton Project	Janet Daily	Pilot
2006	The Path to 9/11	Ambassador Bodine	Miniseries
2007–2008	Back to You	Kelly Carr	Main role
2008	Front of the Class	Ellen Cohen	TV movie
2009–2018	The Middle	Frances “Frankie” Heck	Main role
2011	Easy to Assemble	Mrs. Hullestaad	3 episodes
2015–2016	Patricia Heaton Parties	Herself	Host
2019–2020	Carol's Second Act	Carol Kenney	Main role
2024	Frasier	Holly	3 episodes
2025	Everybody Loves Raymond: 30th Anniversary Reunion	Herself	TV special

== Awards and nominations ==
Critics Choice Television Awards
Year	Nominated work	Category	Result	Ref
2011	The Middle	Best Actress in a Comedy Series	Nominated	
Christopher Awards
Year	Nominated work	Category	Result	Ref
2008	Amazing Grace	Feature Films	Won	
Daytime Emmy Awards
Year	Nominated work	Category	Result	Ref
2016	Patricia Heaton Parties	Outstanding Culinary Program (Executive Producer)	Won	
2016	Patricia Heaton Parties	Outstanding Culinary Host	Nominated	
Online Film & Television Association
Year	Nominated work	Category	Result	Ref
2000	Everybody Loves Raymond	Best Actress in a Comedy Series	Nominated	
2000	Everybody Loves Raymond	Best Ensemble in a Comedy Series	Nominated	
2001	Everybody Loves Raymond	Best Actress in a Comedy Series	Nominated	
2001	Everybody Loves Raymond	Best Ensemble in a Comedy Series	Nominated	
2002	Everybody Loves Raymond	Best Actress in a Comedy Series	Nominated	
2002	Everybody Loves Raymond	Best Ensemble in a Comedy Series	Nominated	
2003	Everybody Loves Raymond	Best Actress in a Comedy Series	Nominated	
2003	Everybody Loves Raymond	Best Ensemble in a Comedy Series	Nominated	
Primetime Emmy Awards
Year	Nominated work	Category	Result	Ref
1999	Everybody Loves Raymond	Outstanding Lead Actress in a Comedy Series	Nominated	
2000	Everybody Loves Raymond	Outstanding Lead Actress in a Comedy Series	Won	
2001	Everybody Loves Raymond	Outstanding Lead Actress in a Comedy Series	Won	
2002	Everybody Loves Raymond	Outstanding Lead Actress in a Comedy Series	Nominated	
2003	Everybody Loves Raymond	Outstanding Lead Actress in a Comedy Series	Nominated	
2004	Everybody Loves Raymond	Outstanding Lead Actress in a Comedy Series	Nominated	
2005	Everybody Loves Raymond	Outstanding Lead Actress in a Comedy Series	Nominated	
Satellite Awards
Year	Nominated work	Category	Result	Ref
2007	Back to You	Best Actress in a Series, Comedy or Musical	Nominated	
Screen Actors Guild Awards
Year	Nominated work	Category	Result	Ref
1999	Everybody Loves Raymond	Outstanding Ensemble in a Comedy Series	Nominated	
2000	Everybody Loves Raymond	Outstanding Ensemble in a Comedy Series	Nominated	
2002	Everybody Loves Raymond	Outstanding Female Actor in a Comedy Series	Nominated	
2002	Everybody Loves Raymond	Outstanding Ensemble in a Comedy Series	Nominated	
2003	Everybody Loves Raymond	Outstanding Female Actor in a Comedy Series	Nominated	
2003	Everybody Loves Raymond	Outstanding Ensemble in a Comedy Series	Won	
2004	Everybody Loves Raymond	Outstanding Female Actor in a Comedy Series	Nominated	
2004	Everybody Loves Raymond	Outstanding Ensemble in a Comedy Series	Nominated	
2005	Everybody Loves Raymond	Outstanding Female Actor in a Comedy Series	Nominated	
2005	Everybody Loves Raymond	Outstanding Ensemble in a Comedy Series	Nominated	
2005	The Goodbye Girl	Outstanding Female Actor in a Miniseries or Television Movie	Nominated	
2006	Everybody Loves Raymond	Outstanding Female Actor in a Comedy Series	Nominated	
2006	Everybody Loves Raymond	Outstanding Ensemble in a Comedy Series	Nominated	
TV Guide Awards
Year	Nominated work	Category	Result	Ref
2001	Everybody Loves Raymond	Actress of the Year in a Comedy Series	Nominated	
Viewers for Quality Television Awards
Year	Nominated work	Category	Result	Ref
1997	Everybody Loves Raymond	Best Actress in a Quality Comedy Series	Nominated	
1998	Everybody Loves Raymond	Best Actress in a Quality Comedy Series	Nominated	
1999	Everybody Loves Raymond	Best Actress in a Quality Comedy Series	Won	
2000	Everybody Loves Raymond	Best Actress in a Quality Comedy Series	Won	
Walk of Fame
Year	Nominated work	Category	Result	Ref
2012	—N/a	Television – 653 Hollywood, Blvd.	Won	
