= Waynesburg Central High School =

Coordinates: 39.89528°N 80.14871°W

Location
- 30 Zimmerman Drive; Franklin Township, Greene County, Pennsylvania; Waynesburg, Greene, Pennsylvania 15370

Information
- School type: Public High School
- Opened: 1969
- School district: Central Greene
- NCES District ID: 4205430
- Superintendent: Matthew Blair
- NCES School ID: 420543005118
- Principal: Bob Stephenson
- Teaching staff: 41.46 (FTE)
- Grades: 9-12
- Enrollment: 516 (2020-21)
  - Grade 9: 132
  - Grade 10: 135
  - Grade 11: 133
  - Grade 12: 116
- Student to teacher ratio: 12.45
- Colors: Red and Black
- Slogan: "Nothing Greater than a Raider"
- Athletics conference: PIAA District VII (WPIAL)
- Mascot: Raiders
- Team name: Raiders
- Newspaper: The Raider Review
- Yearbook: Oracle
- Feeder schools: Waynesburg Central Elementary School

Waynesburg Central High School is a public high school serving around 500 students in grades 9-12 and is located near Waynesburg, the county seat of Greene County. WCHS is the sole high school of the Central Greene School District.

== School Campus ==
Recently renovated and expanded, the campus was constructed in 1969 and features an auditorium, natatorium and an artificial turf Football field.

== Alma Mater ==
The Alma Mater for WCHS:
Waynesburg, dear Waynesburg
Our teams won't yield
And sportsmen you’ll find them
In class, floor and field;
And our banner glorious
Our red and black
We’ll always honor
Nor courage we’ll lack
For Waynesburg, dear Waynesburg
Our cheer we’ll raise
And thee will we cherish
Through all our days
And even as old grads
We will come back,
To swell the chorus
For red and black.

== Clubs ==
The following clubs are available at WCHS:

- Debate
- Drama
- Envirothon
- Fellowship of Christian Athletes
- Letterman's Club
- National Honor Society
- Oracle (Yearbook)
- PRIDE
- Relay for Life (Student Chapter)
- Ski Club
- The Raider Review
- WCHS Track and Field
- Future Business Leaders of America
- Spanish Club
- Creative Writing Club

== Athletics ==
Waynesburg Central High School is a member of the Pennsylvania Interscholastic Athletic Association (PIAA) and the Western Pennsylvania Interscholastic Athletic League (WPIAL). Waynesburg Central is in PIAA District 7.

Sport Name	Boys	Girls
Baseball	Class AA	
Basketball	Class AAA	Class AAA
Cross-Country	Class AA	Class AA
Football	Class AAA	
Golf	Class AA	
Soccer	Class AA	Class AA
Softball		Class AA
Track and Field	Class AA	Class AA
Volleyball		Class AA
Wrestling	Class AAA	

== Notable Graduates ==
- Todd Tamanend Clark, poet and composer (1970)
- Sarah Rush, actress (1973)
- Josh Koscheck, professional MMA fighter (1997)
- Jesse Richardson, Draw the Lines PA 2018 winner (2019)
- Bill George, Linebacker Chicago Bears and LA Rams. In the Pro Football hall of fame.
- Coleman Scott, four-time All American wrestler and 2008 national champion for Oklahoma State, 2012 Olympic bronze medalist (2004)
