= Central Greene School District =

School district in Pennsylvania

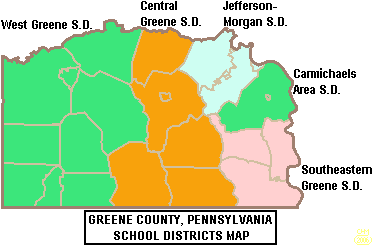

Address
- 250 South Cumberland Street Waynesburg, Greene County, Pennsylvania, 15370-0472; United States

District information
- Type: Public

Students and staff
- District mascot: Raiders

Other information
- Website: cgsd.org

The Central Greene School District is a small, rural public school district located in Greene County, Pennsylvania. The district serves: the Borough of Waynesburg and Franklin Township, Perry Township, Washington Township, Wayne Township and Whiteley Township. It encompasses approximately 168 square miles (440 km^{2}). In 1962, the district was created through an agreed joining of school administrations in each six townships served. The district is located about sixty miles south of Pittsburgh and twenty miles north of Morgantown, West Virginia. According to the 2000 federal census data, Central Greene School District served a resident population of 16,681. By 2010, the district's population declined to 15,902 people. In 2009, the district residents' per capita income was $14,354, while the median family income was $39,358. The educational attainment levels for the population 25 and over were 84.8% high school graduates and 15.8% college graduates.

Central Greene School District operates three schools: Waynesburg Central Elementary School, Margaret Bell Miller Middle School and Waynesburg Central High School. The facilities include a pool, a football stadium, an auditorium, a soccer field and indoor basketball courts that are used as a community center for the Waynesburg area. High school students may choose to attend Greene County Career and Technology Center for training in the construction and mechanical trades. The Intermediate Unit IU1 provides the district with a wide variety of services like specialized education for disabled students and hearing, speech and visual disability services and professional development for staff and faculty.

== Extracurriculars ==
Central Greene School District offers a variety of clubs, activities and interscholastic sports.

=== Sports ===
The district funds:

Boys

- Baseball – AAA
- Basketball- AAA
- Cross Country – AA
- Football – AA
- Golf – AA
- Rifle
- Soccer – AA
- Track and Field – AA
- Wrestling – AA

Girls

- Basketball – AAA
- Cross Country – AA
- Rifle
- Soccer (Fall) – AA
- Softball – AA
- Track and Field – AA
- Volleyball – AA

Middle School Sports

Boys

- Basketball
- Football
- Soccer
- Track and Field
- Wrestling

Girls

- Basketball
- Soccer
- Softball
- Track and Field
- Volleyball

According to PIAA directory July 2012

== Closed school ==
On August 9, 2011, the Central Greene School Board voted to close Perry Elementary as a cost-saving measure. All elementary students in the district were shifted to attend Waynesburg Central Elementary School.
