= 1982 in the United States =

- Decades: 1960s; 1970s; 1980s; 1990s; 2000s
- See also: History of the United States (1980–1991); Timeline of United States history (1970–1989); List of years in the United States

Events from the year 1982 in the United States.

== Incumbents ==
=== Federal government ===
- President: Ronald Reagan (R-California)
- Vice President: George H. W. Bush (R-Texas)
- Chief Justice: Warren E. Burger (Virginia)
- Speaker of the House of Representatives: Tip O'Neill (D-Massachusetts)
- Senate Majority Leader: Howard Baker (R-Tennessee)
- Congress: 97th

==== State governments ====
Governors and lieutenant governors

=== Governors ===
- Governor of Alabama: Fob James (Democratic)
- Governor of Alaska: Jay Hammond (Republican) (until December 6), Bill Sheffield (Democratic) (starting December 6)
- Governor of Arizona: Bruce Babbitt (Democratic)
- Governor of Arkansas: Frank D. White (Republican)
- Governor of California: Jerry Brown (Democratic)
- Governor of Colorado: Richard Lamm (Democratic)
- Governor of Connecticut: William A O'Neill (Democratic)
- Governor of Delaware: Pierre S. du Pont, IV (Republican)
- Governor of Florida: Bob Graham (Democratic)
- Governor of Georgia: George Busbee (Democratic)
- Governor of Hawaii: George Ariyoshi (Democratic)
- Governor of Idaho: John V. Evans (Democratic)
- Governor of Illinois: James R. Thompson (Republican)
- Governor of Indiana: Robert D. Orr (Republican)
- Governor of Iowa: Robert D. Ray (Republican)
- Governor of Kansas: John W. Carlin (Democratic)
- Governor of Kentucky: John Y. Brown Jr. (Democratic)
- Governor of Louisiana: David C. Treen (Republican)
- Governor of Maine: Joseph E. Brennan (Democratic)
- Governor of Maryland: Harry R. Hughes (Democratic)
- Governor of Massachusetts: Edward J. King (Democratic)
- Governor of Michigan: William Milliken (Republican)
- Governor of Minnesota: Al Quie (Republican)
- Governor of Mississippi: William Winter (Democratic)
- Governor of Missouri: Kit Bond (Republican)
- Governor of Montana: Ted Schwinden (Democratic)
- Governor of Nebraska: Charles Thone (Republican)
- Governor of Nevada: Robert List (Republican)
- Governor of New Hampshire: Hugh J. Gallen (Democratic) (until December 29), Vesta M. Roy (Republican) (starting December 29)
- Governor of New Jersey: Brendan Byrne (Democratic) (until January 19), Thomas Kean (Republican) (starting January 19)
- Governor of New Mexico: Bruce King (Democratic)
- Governor of New York: Hugh Carey (Democratic) (until end of December 31)
- Governor of North Carolina: Jim Hunt (Democratic)
- Governor of North Dakota: Allen I. Olson (Republican)
- Governor of Ohio: Jim Rhodes (Republican)
- Governor of Oklahoma: George Nigh (Democratic)
- Governor of Oregon: Victor G. Atiyeh (Republican)
- Governor of Pennsylvania: Dick Thornburgh (Republican)
- Governor of Rhode Island: J. Joseph Garrahy (Democratic)
- Governor of South Carolina: Richard Riley (Democratic)
- Governor of South Dakota: William J. Janklow (Republican)
- Governor of Tennessee: Lamar Alexander (Republican)
- Governor of Texas: Bill Clements (Republican)
- Governor of Utah: Scott M. Matheson (Democratic)
- Governor of Vermont: Richard A. Snelling (Republican)
- Governor of Virginia: John N. Dalton (Republican) (until January 16), Chuck Robb (Democratic) (starting January 16)
- Governor of Washington: John Spellman (Republican)
- Governor of West Virginia: Jay Rockefeller (Democratic)
- Governor of Wisconsin: Lee S. Dreyfus (Republican)
- Governor of Wyoming: Edgar J. Herschler (Democratic)

=== Lieutenant governors ===
- Lieutenant Governor of Alabama: George McMillan (Democratic)
- Lieutenant Governor of Alaska: Terry Miller (Republican) (until December 6), Stephen McAlpine (Democratic) (starting December 6)
- Lieutenant Governor of Arkansas: Winston Bryant (Democratic)
- Lieutenant Governor of California: Mike Curb (Republican)
- Lieutenant Governor of Colorado: Nancy Dick (Democratic)
- Lieutenant Governor of Connecticut: Joseph J. Fauliso (Democratic)
- Lieutenant Governor of Delaware: Michael N. Castle (Republican)
- Lieutenant Governor of Florida: Wayne Mixson (Democratic)
- Lieutenant Governor of Georgia: Zell Miller (Democratic)
- Lieutenant Governor of Hawaii: Jean King (Democratic) (until December 2), John D. Waihee III (Democratic) (starting December 2)
- Lieutenant Governor of Idaho: Phil Batt (Democratic)
- Lieutenant Governor of Illinois: vacant
- Lieutenant Governor of Indiana: John Mutz (Republican)
- Lieutenant Governor of Iowa: Terry E. Branstad (Republican)
- Lieutenant Governor of Kansas: Paul V. Dugan (Democratic)
- Lieutenant Governor of Kentucky: Martha Layne Collins (Democratic)
- Lieutenant Governor of Louisiana: Robert "Bobby" Freeman (Democratic)
- Lieutenant Governor of Maryland: Samuel Bogley (Democratic) (until January 19), vacant (starting January 19)
- Lieutenant Governor of Massachusetts: Thomas P. O'Neill III (Democratic)
- Lieutenant Governor of Michigan: James H. Brickley (Republican) (until December 27), vacant (starting December 27)
- Lieutenant Governor of Minnesota: Lou Wangberg (Republican)
- Lieutenant Governor of Mississippi: Brad Dye (Democratic)
- Lieutenant Governor of Missouri: Kenneth Rothman (Democratic)
- Lieutenant Governor of Montana: George Turman (Democratic)
- Lieutenant Governor of Nebraska: Roland Luedtke (Republican)
- Lieutenant Governor of Nevada: Myron E. Leavitt (Democratic)
- Lieutenant Governor of New Mexico: Roberto Mondragón (Democratic)
- Lieutenant Governor of New York: Mario Cuomo (Democratic) (until end of December 31)
- Lieutenant Governor of North Carolina: James C. Green (Democratic)
- Lieutenant Governor of North Dakota: Ernest Sands (Republican)
- Lieutenant Governor of Ohio: vacant
- Lieutenant Governor of Oklahoma: Spencer Bernard (Democratic)
- Lieutenant Governor of Pennsylvania: William Scranton, III (Republican)
- Lieutenant Governor of Rhode Island: Thomas R. DiLuglio (Democratic)
- Lieutenant Governor of South Carolina: Nancy Stevenson (Democratic)
- Lieutenant Governor of South Dakota: Lowell C. Hansen II (Republican)
- Lieutenant Governor of Tennessee: John S. Wilder (Democratic)
- Lieutenant Governor of Texas: William P. Hobby Jr. (Democratic)
- Lieutenant Governor of Utah: David Smith Monson (Republican)
- Lieutenant Governor of Vermont: Madeleine M. Kunin (Democratic)
- Lieutenant Governor of Virginia: Chuck Robb (Democratic) (until January 16), Richard Joseph Davis (Democratic) (starting January 16)
- Lieutenant Governor of Washington: John Cherberg (Democratic)
- Lieutenant Governor of Wisconsin: Russell A. Olson (Republican)

== Events ==
=== January ===
- January 1 – Eddie Murphy makes his first appearance on "The Tonight Show Starring Johnny Carson".
- January 7 – The Commodore 64 8-bit home computer is launched by Commodore International in Las Vegas
- January 8 – AT&T agrees to divest itself into 22 subdivisions.
- January 11–17 – A brutal cold snap sends temperatures to all-time record lows in dozens of cities throughout the Midwestern United States.
- January 13 – Shortly after takeoff, Air Florida Flight 90 crashes into Washington, D.C.'s 14th Street Bridge and falls into the Potomac River, killing 78 (five survive). On the same day, a Washington Metro train derails to the north, killing three (the system's first fatal accident).
- January 17 – Cold Sunday sweeps over the northern United States.
- January 26 – President Reagan delivers his first State of the Union Address.
- January 28 – United States Army Brigadier General James L. Dozier is rescued by the Italian anti-terrorism Nucleo Operativo Centrale di Sicurezza (NOCS) force after being held captive for 42 days by the Red Brigades.

=== February ===
- February – Brake Masters, an automotive repair chain is founded in Tucson, Arizona.
- February 1 – Late Night with David Letterman makes its debut on NBC. The first guest is Bill Murray, who, 33 years later, will be the last guest David Letterman has on.
- February 27 – Atlanta murders of 1979–81: Wayne Williams is convicted of murdering two children and is sentenced to two consecutive life terms.
- February 28 – Adobe Systems is founded in the United States.

=== March ===
- March 10 – The United States places an embargo on Libyan oil imports, alleging Libyan support for terrorist groups.
- March 16 – In Newport, Rhode Island, Claus von Bülow is found guilty of the attempted murder of his wife.
- March 26 – A ground-breaking ceremony for the Vietnam Veterans Memorial is held in Washington, DC.
- March 29 – The 54th Academy Awards, hosted by Johnny Carson, are held at Dorothy Chandler Pavilion in Los Angeles. Hugh Hudson's Chariots of Fire wins Best Picture and three other Academy Awards. Warren Beatty wins Best Director for Reds out of 12 nominations, while Steven Spielberg's Raiders of the Lost Ark wins five awards.

=== April ===
- April 6 – A blizzard unprecedented in size for April dumps 1–2 feet of snow on the northeastern United States, closing schools and businesses, snarling traffic, and canceling several major league baseball games.
- April 21 – Queen Beatrix becomes the first Dutch monarch to address the United States Congress.
- April 23 – Dennis Wardlow, mayor of Key West, Florida, declares the independent "Conch Republic" for a day.

=== May ===
- May 1 – A crowd of over 100,000 attends the first day of the 1982 World's Fair in Knoxville, Tennessee. The fair is kicked off with an address by President Ronald Reagan. Over 11 million people attend the fair during its 6-month run.
- May 2 – The Weather Channel is begun in the U.S.
- May 5 – A Unabomber bomb explodes in the computer science department at Vanderbilt University; secretary Janet Smith is injured.
- May 12 – Braniff International Airways is declared bankrupt and ceases all flights.
- May 30
  - Indianapolis 500: In what Indianapolis Motor Speedway historian Donald Davidson and Speedway public address announcer Tom Carnegie later call the greatest moment in the track's history, 1973 winner Gordon Johncock wins his second race over 1979 winner Rick Mears by 0.16 seconds, the closest finish to that date, after Mears draws alongside Johncock with a lap remaining, after erasing a seemingly insurmountable advantage of more than 11 seconds in the final 10 laps.
  - Cal Ripken Jr. plays the first of what eventually becomes his record-breaking streak of 2,632 consecutive Major League Baseball games in the United States.

=== June ===
- June 4 – Steven Spielberg and Tobe Hooper's horror film collaboration, Poltergeist, is released.
- June 8 – President Reagan becomes the first American chief executive to address a joint session of the British Parliament.
- June 12 – A rally against nuclear weapons draws 750,000 to New York City's Central Park. Jackson Browne, James Taylor, Bruce Springsteen and Linda Ronstadt attend. An international convocation at the Cathedral of St. John the Divine features prominent peace activists from around the world and afterward participants march on Fifth Avenue to Central Park for the rally.
- June 19 – Murder of Vincent Chin: Vincent Chin, a 27 year old Chinese American, is beaten unconscious by two white auto-workers in Highland Park, Michigan, who think he is Japanese and the cause of the declining prosperity of the American auto industry; he dies four days later.
- June 25 – The Institute for Puerto Rican Policy is founded in New York City to research and advocate for Puerto Rican and Latino community issues. In 2006, it changes its name to the National Institute for Latino Policy.
- June 30 – The Equal Rights Amendment to the Constitution of the United States falls short of the 38 states needed to pass.

=== July ===
- July 2 – Larry Walters, a.k.a. Lawnchair Larry, flies 16,000 feet above Long Beach, California, in a lawn chair with weather balloons attached.
- July 9 – Pan Am Flight 759 (Boeing 727) crashes in Kenner, Louisiana, killing all 146 on board and eight on the ground.
- July 12 – Checker Motors Corporation, an American taxicab manufacturer, ceases production.
- July 16 – In New York City, The Reverend Sun Myung Moon is sentenced to 18 months in prison and fined $25,000 for tax fraud and conspiracy to obstruct justice.
- July 23 – A helicopter crash in Santa Clarita, California, kills actor Vic Morrow and child actors Myca Dinh Le and Renee Shin-Yi Chen during the production of Twilight Zone: The Movie.

=== August ===
- August 20
  - Lebanese Civil War: A multinational force lands in Beirut to oversee the PLO withdrawal from Lebanon. French troops arrive August 21, U.S. Marines August 25.
  - School teacher Carl Robert Brown murders eight people inside a welding shop in Miami, Florida, before being shot dead by a passing motorist.

=== September ===
- September 1 – The United States Air Force Space Command is founded.
- September 3 – Speaker O'Neill and President Reagan settle one of the most unforgettable deals in US history (Tax Equity and Fiscal Responsibility Act), which would cut the ratio of spending of three to one and add more taxes.
- September 5 – Iowa paperboy Johnny Gosch is kidnapped.
- September 15 – The first edition of USA Today is published.
- September 28 – 13 year old Lisa Ann Millican is murdered in Georgia after being abducted from a mall three days earlier by Alvin and Judith Neelley. She is tortured and raped, with Judith Neelley injecting her with Drano and Liquid Plumber in her neck and later shooting her to death.
- September 29–October 1 – The 1982 Chicago Tylenol murders occur when seven people in the Chicago area die after ingesting capsules laced with potassium cyanide.

=== October ===
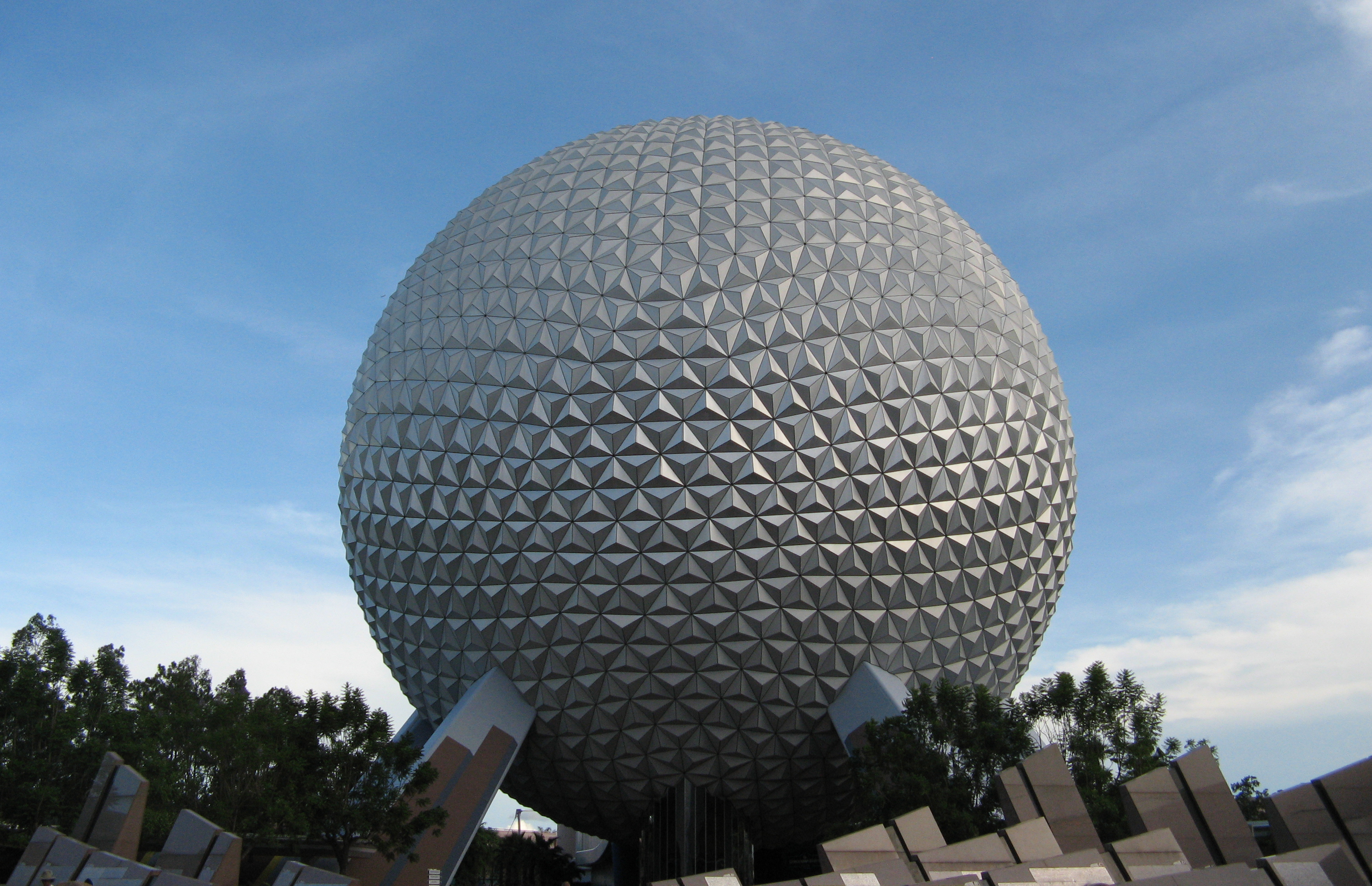
October 1: EPCOT Center opens

- October 1 – In Orlando, Florida, Walt Disney World opens the second largest theme park, EPCOT Center, to the public for the first time.
- October 15 – The Garn–St. Germain Depository Institutions Act deregulates the U.S. savings and loan industry.
- October 19 – Car designer John DeLorean is arrested for selling cocaine to undercover FBI agents (he is later found not guilty on the grounds of entrapment).
- October 20 – World Series: The St. Louis Cardinals defeat the Milwaukee Brewers, 4 games to 3, to win their 9th World Series Title.
- October 30 – The DeLorean Motor Company ceases production.

=== November ===
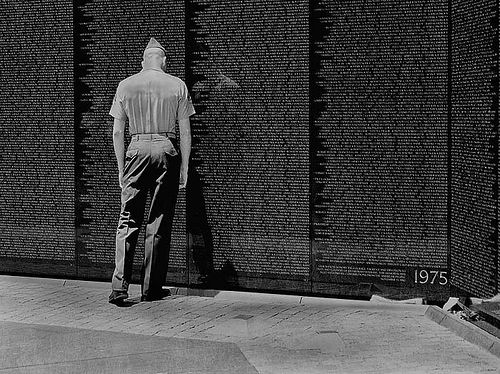
November 13: The Vietnam Veterans Memorial is dedicated

- November – The severe early 1980s recession ends sometime this month.
- November – The unemployment rate peaks at 10.8%.
- November 2 – United States elections, 1982. The Republican Party loses 27 seats to the majority Democratic Party in the House.
- November 3 – The Dow Jones Industrial Average surges 43.41 points, or 4.25%, to close at 1,065.49, its first all-time high in more than 9 years. It last hit a record on January 11, 1973, when the average closed at 1,051.70. The points gain is the biggest ever up to this point.
- November 13 – The Vietnam Veterans Memorial is dedicated in Washington, D.C., after a march to its site by thousands of Vietnam War veterans.
- November 20 – University of California, Berkeley, executes "The Play" in a college football game against Stanford. Completing a wacky 57-yard kickoff return that includes 5 laterals, Kevin Moen runs through Stanford band members who had prematurely come onto the field. His touchdown stands and California wins 25–20.
- November 25 – The Minneapolis Thanksgiving Day fire destroys an entire city block of downtown Minneapolis, including the headquarters of Northwestern National Bank.
- November 30 – Michael Jackson releases Thriller, the biggest-selling album of all time.

=== December ===
- December – John Warnock and Charles Geschke founds Adobe Systems Incorporated (now Adobe Inc.).
- December 2 – At the University of Utah, 61-year-old retired dentist Barney Clark becomes the first person to receive a permanent artificial heart (he lives for 112 days with the device).
- December 3 – A final soil sample is taken from the site of Times Beach, Missouri. It is found to contain 300 times the safe level of dioxin.
- December 7 – The first U.S. execution by lethal injection is carried out in Texas on Charles Brooks Jr.
- December 23 – The United States Environmental Protection Agency recommends the evacuation of Times Beach, Missouri, due to dangerous levels of dioxin contamination.
- December 24 – The "Christmas Eve Blizzard of '82" hits Denver.
- December 29 – Paul "Bear" Bryant coaches his final college football game, leading Alabama to a 21–15 victory over Illinois in the Liberty Bowl at Memphis, Tennessee. Bryant dies of a massive heart attack four weeks later at age 69.

=== Undated ===
- A severe recession intensifies in the United States as part of the early 1980s recession.
- Seattle is officially dubbed the Emerald City after a contest is held to choose a new city slogan.

=== Ongoing ===
- Cold War (1947–1991)
- Early 1980s recession (1981–1982)

== Births ==
=== January ===
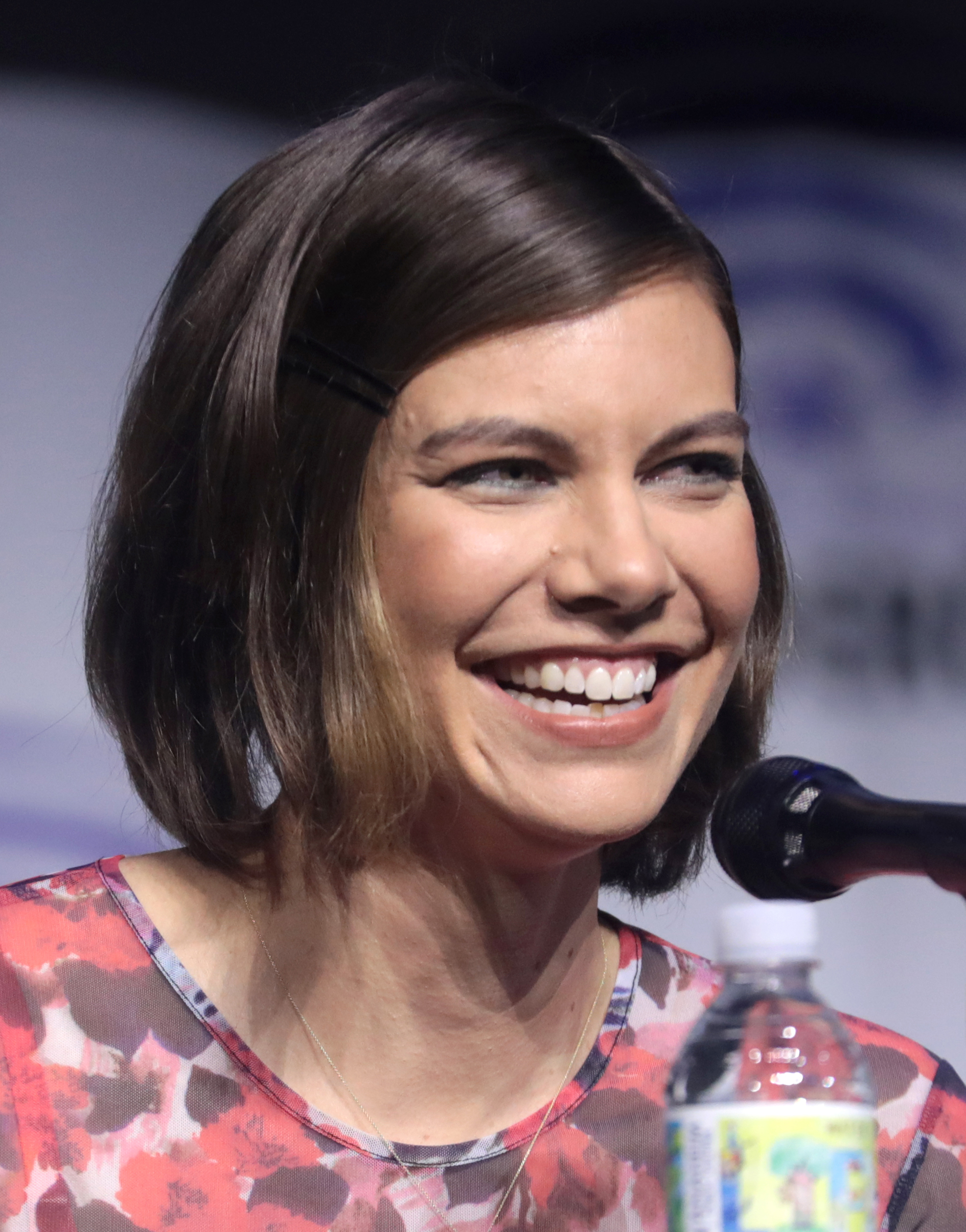
Lauren Cohan

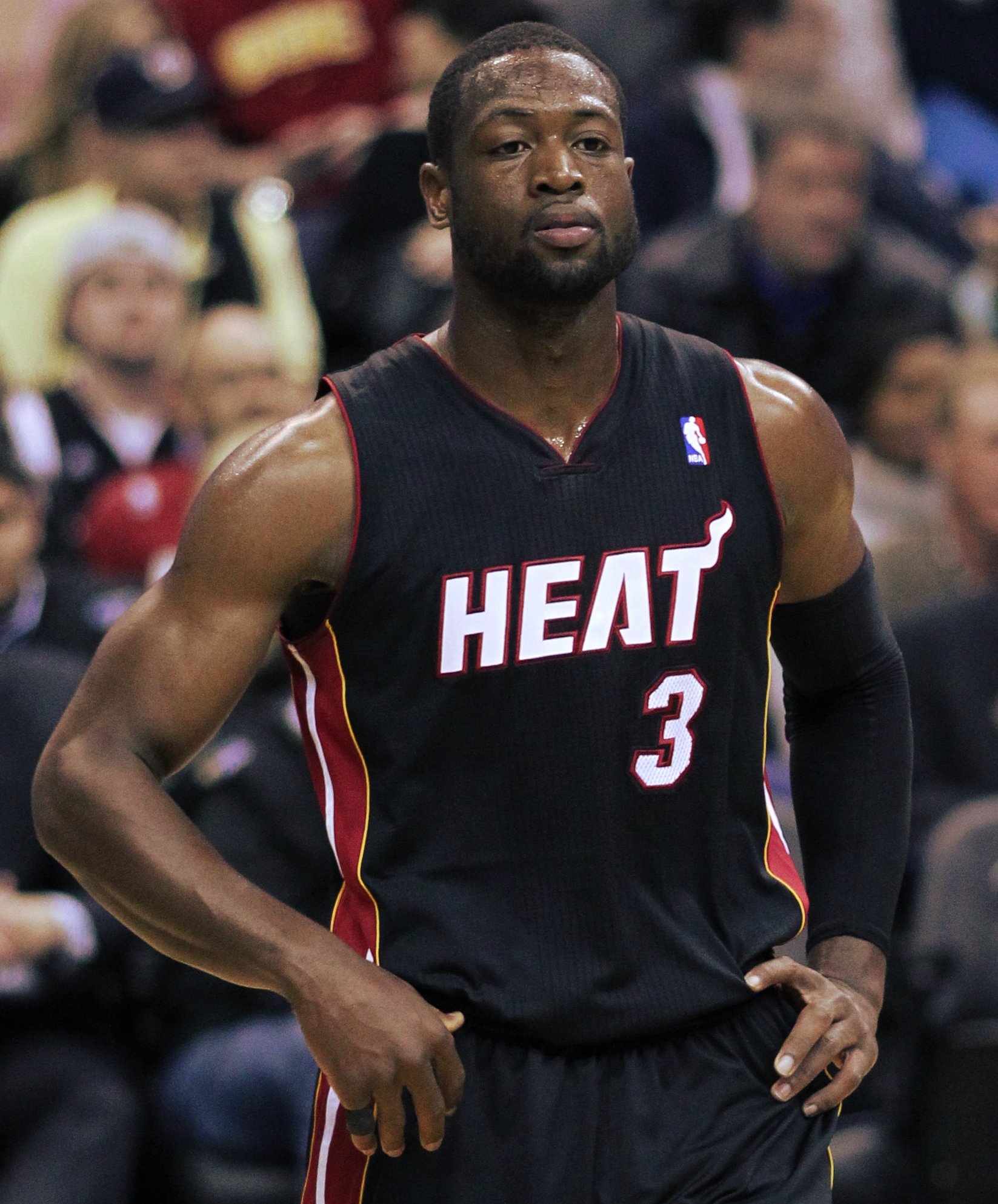
Dwyane Wade

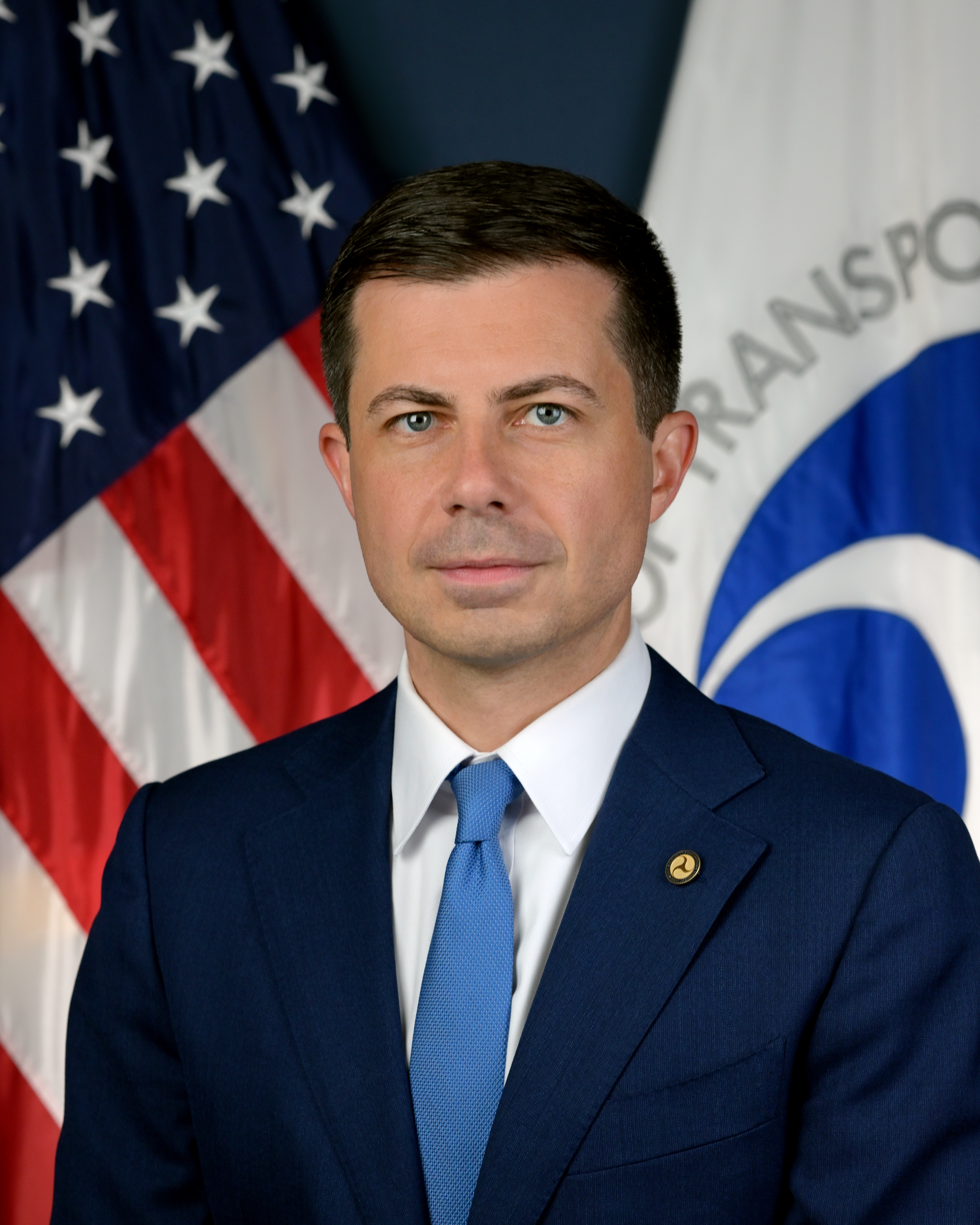
Pete Buttigieg

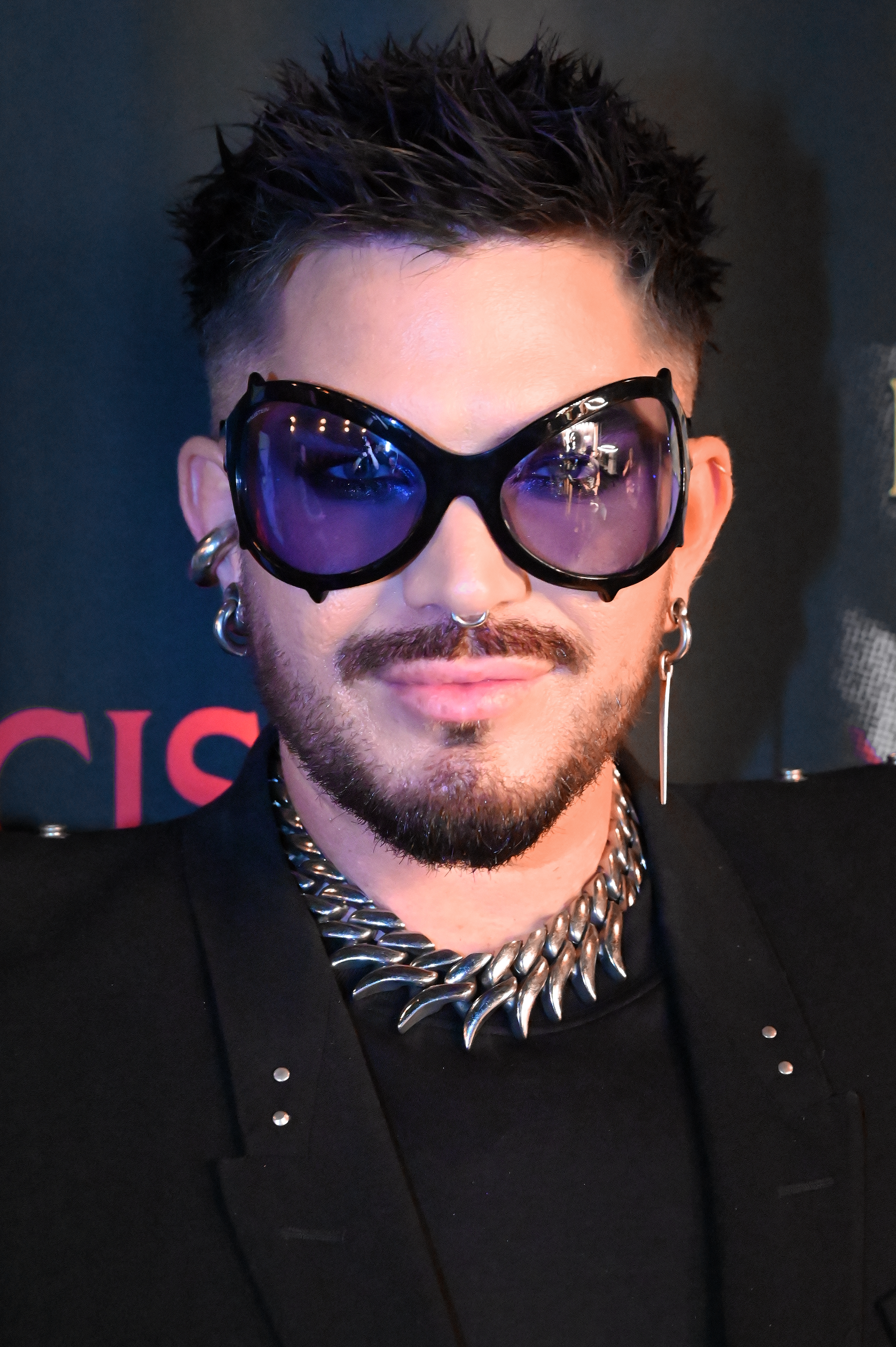
Adam Lambert

- January 2 – Kevin Dudley, football player
- January 4 – Hollie Stevens, pornographic actress and model (d. 2012)
- January 5 – Jessica Chaffin, actress, comedian, and writer
- January 6 – Gilbert Arenas, basketball player
- January 7 – Lauren Cohan, actress
- January 8
  - Wil Francis, rock musician, record producer, author, and artist
  - Gaby Hoffmann, actress
  - Cristina Tzintzún Ramirez, labor organizer, writer, and political candidate
- January 10
  - Tavoris Cloud, boxer
  - Josh Ryan Evans, actor (d. 2002)
- January 11
  - Tony 'The Grindfather' Allen, basketball player
  - Blake Heron, actor (d. 2017)
- January 12 – Dontrelle Willis, baseball player
- January 13
  - Jason Ayers, wrestling referee
  - Pawel Szajda, actor
- January 14
  - Chad Aquino, boxer
  - Vincent Bennett, singer and frontman for The Acacia Strain
- January 15
  - Benjamin Agosto, skater
  - Brett Lebda, hockey player
- January 17
  - David Blue, actor
  - Dwyane Wade, basketball player
- January 18
  - Ruby Franke, former vlogger
  - Quinn Allman, guitarist for The Used (2001–2015)
  - Joanna Newsom, singer, harpist, pianist, and songwriter
  - Danny Ledonne, film director, and former video game developer
- January 19
  - Pete Buttigieg, politician
  - Jodie Sweetin, actress
- January 20 – Erin Wasson, model and actress
- January 22 – Jason Peters, football player
- January 23 – Patrick Levis, actor
- January 24 – Daveed Diggs, actor and rapper
- January 25 – Bella Blue, burlesque dancer
- January 26
  - Reggie Hodges, football player
  - Nicole Saphier, journalist, radiologist, and writer
- January 28 – Erika M. Anderson, singer/songwriter
- January 29
  - Adam Lambert, singer/songwriter and actor
  - Heidi Mueller, actress
  - Riff Raff, rapper and television personality
- January 30 – DeStorm Power, internet personality

=== February ===
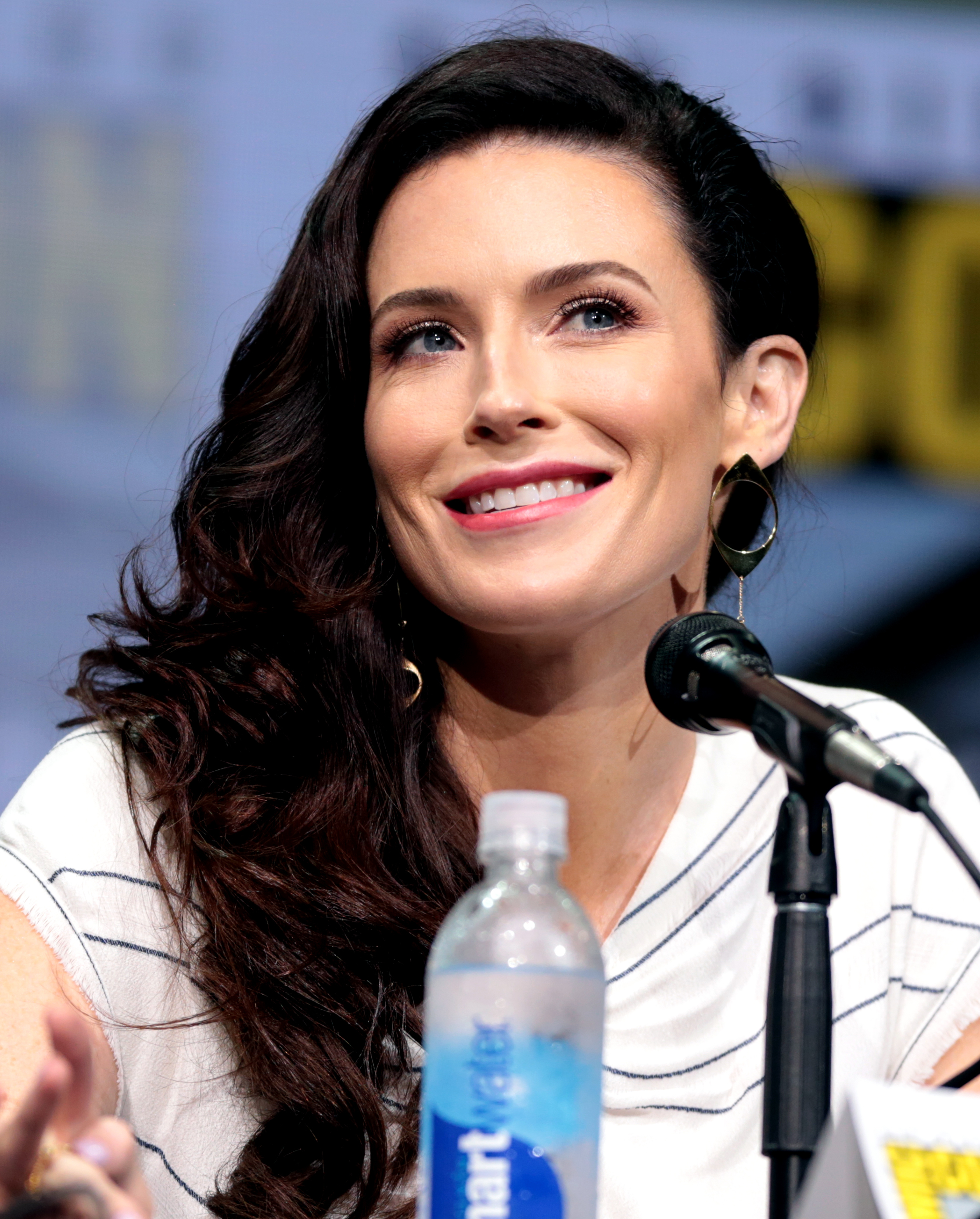
Bridget Regan

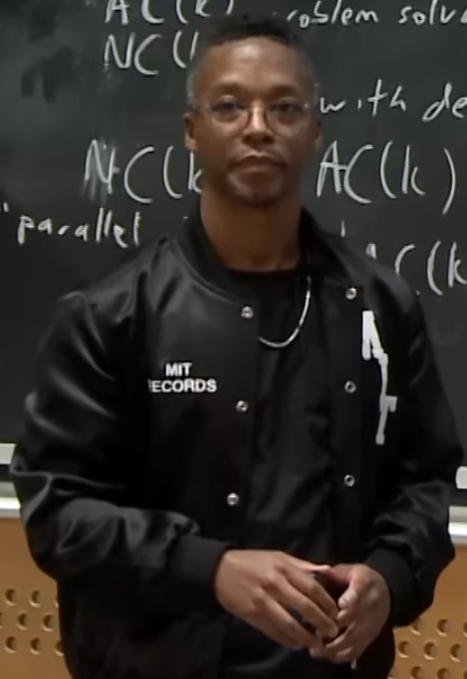
Lupe Fiasco

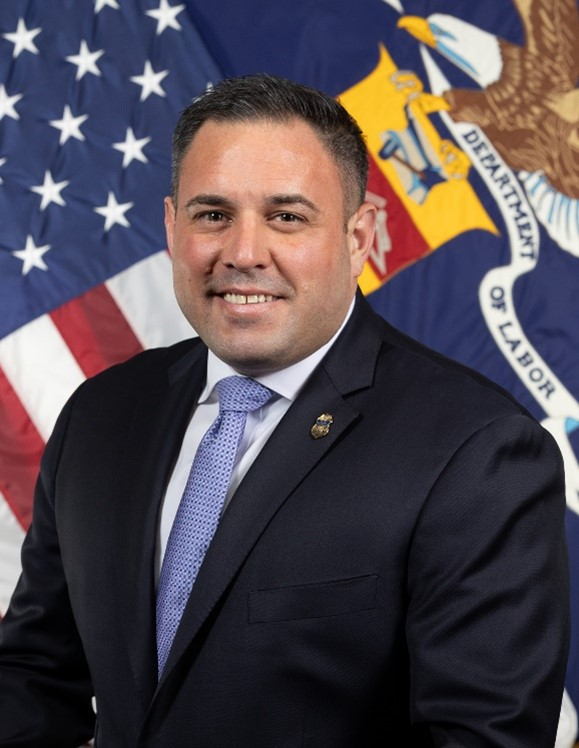
Anthony D'Esposito

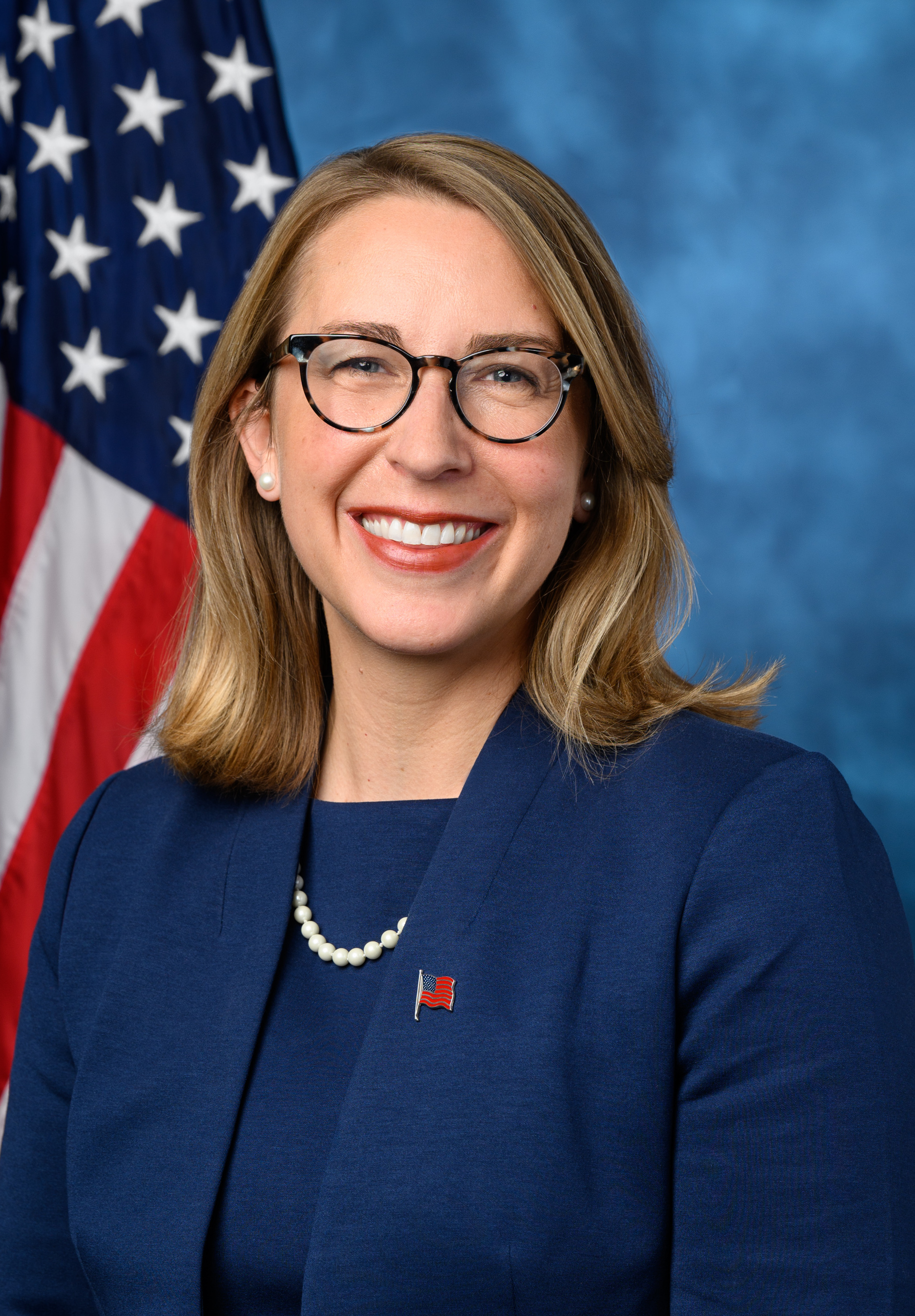
Hillary Scholten

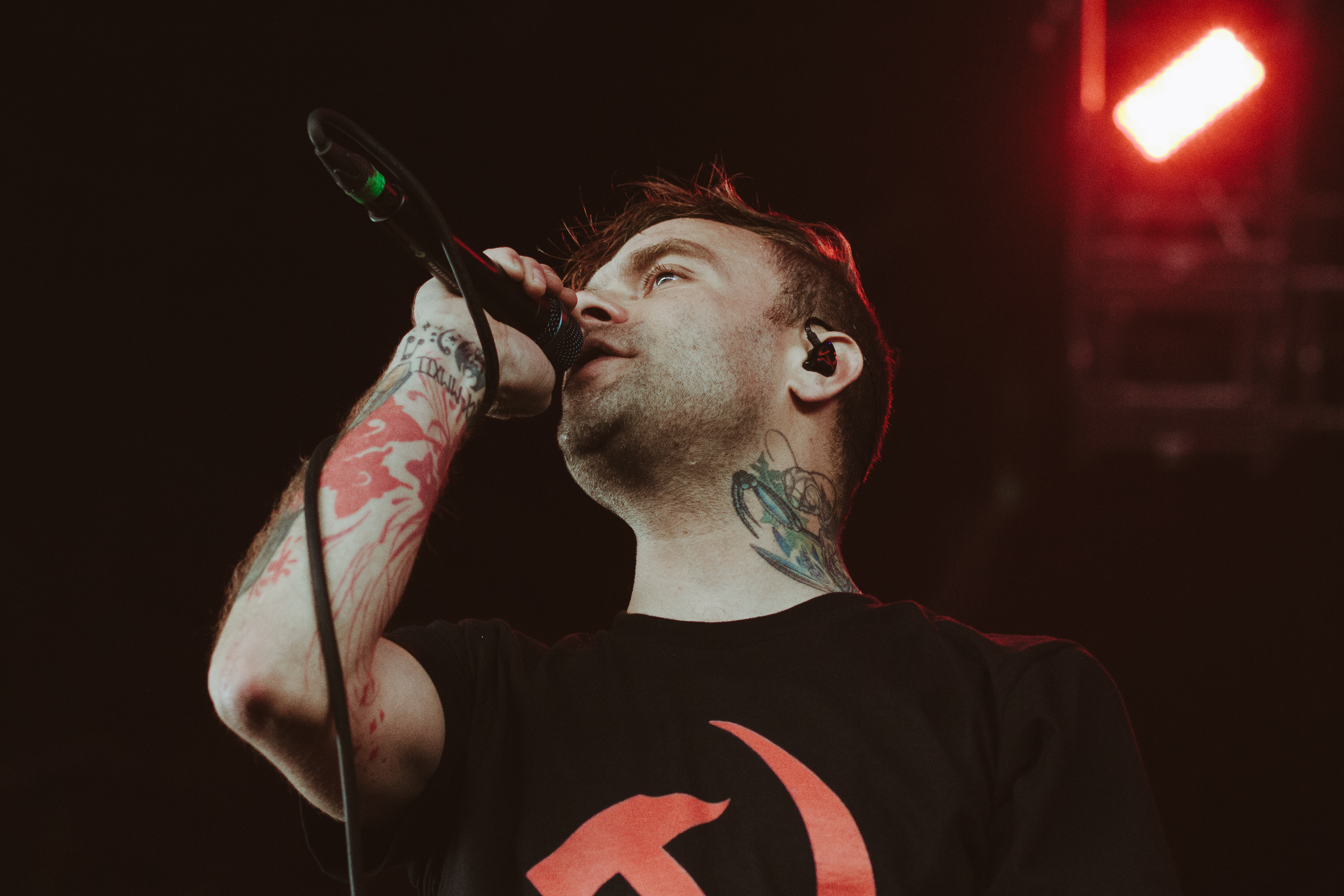
Bert McCracken

- February 2
  - Katie Britt, U.S. Senator from Alabama
  - Kelly Mazzante, basketball player
- February 3
  - Becky Bayless, wrestler
  - Bridget Regan, actress
- February 4
  - Nelson Akwari, soccer player
  - Chris Sabin, wrestler
  - Mandisa Stevenson, basketball player
  - Kimberly Wyatt, television personality, actress, singer, dancer, and member of The Pussycat Dolls (2003–2010)
- February 5
  - China Mac, rapper
  - Kevin Everett, football player
- February 6 – John Murante, politician
- February 8
  - Eric Alexander, football player
  - Danny Tamberelli, actor
- February 10 – Sean Anthony, DJ, music producer, rapper, songwriter, and screenwriter
- February 19 – Justin Gatlin, athlete
- February 13 – Lanisha Cole, model
- February 14
  - Sean Danielsen, singer/songwriter, guitarist, and frontman for Smile Empty Soul and World Fire Brigade
  - Tati Westbrook, makeup artist
- February 16
  - Lupe Fiasco, rapper and music educator
  - Conway the Machine, rapper
- February 17 – Vanessa Atler, gymnast
- February 18 – Jessie Ward, actress
- February 22
  - Cory Allen, author, podcast host, musician, composer, and mastering engineer
  - Kim Allen, actress
  - Kimball Allen, writer, journalist, playwright, and actor
  - Anthony D'Esposito, politician
  - Kelly Johnson, baseball player
  - Hillary Scholten, politician
- February 23 – Adam Hann-Byrd, actor and screenwriter
- February 25
  - Kimberly Caldwell, singer
  - Maria Kanellis, wrestler and model
  - Bert McCracken, singer and frontman for The Used
- February 26
  - Mario Austin, basketball player
  - DeRay Davis, actor and comedian
- February 28 – Randi Zuckerberg, businesswoman, author, and television creator

=== March ===
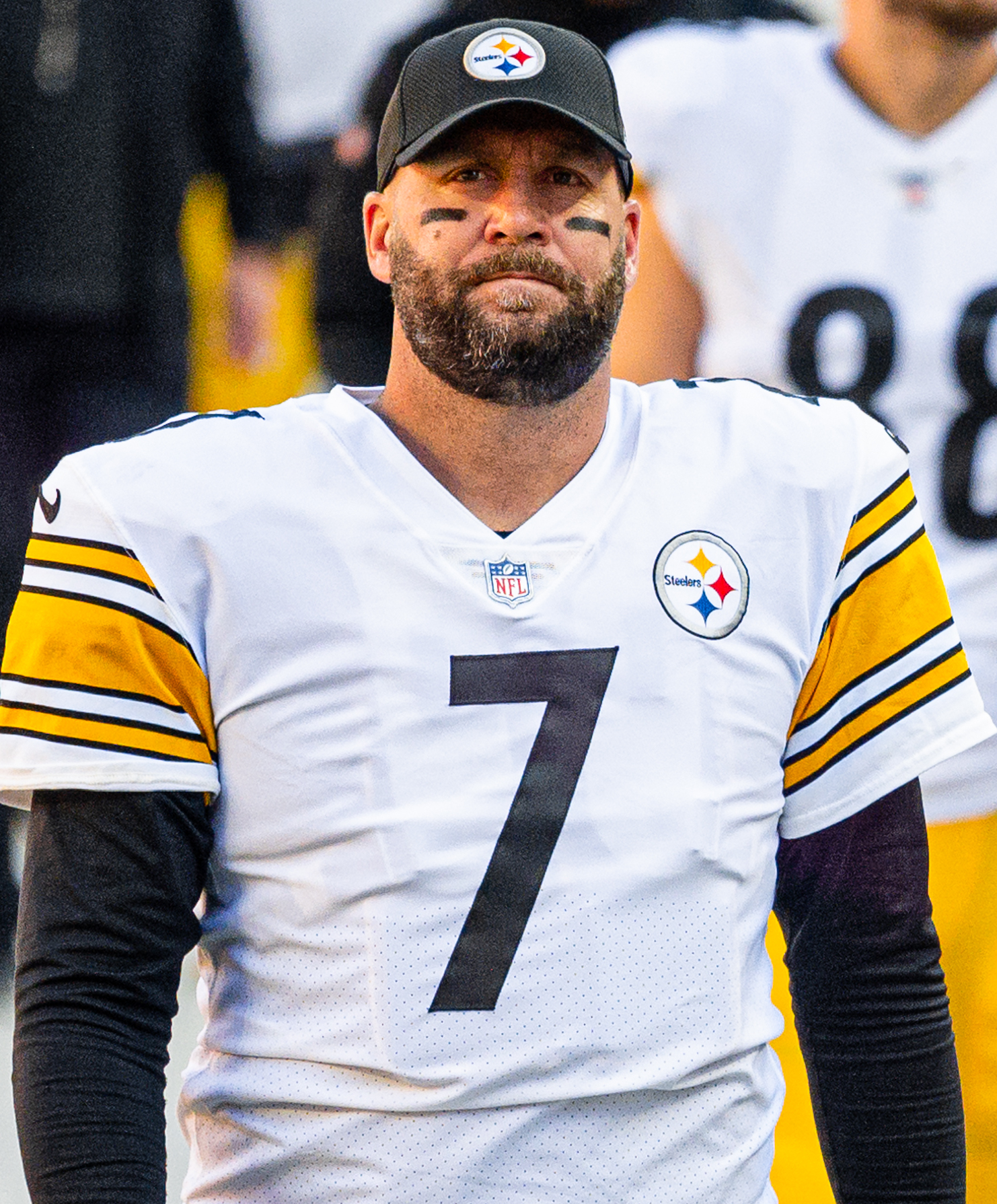
Ben Roethlisberger

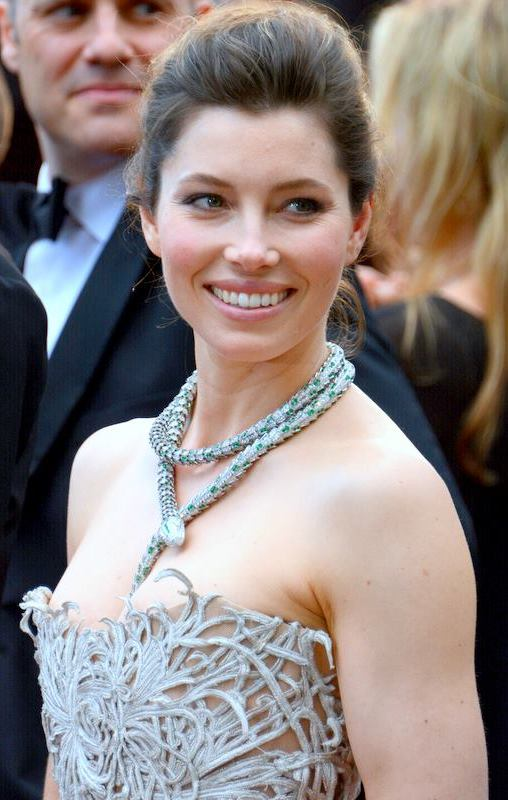
Jessica Biel

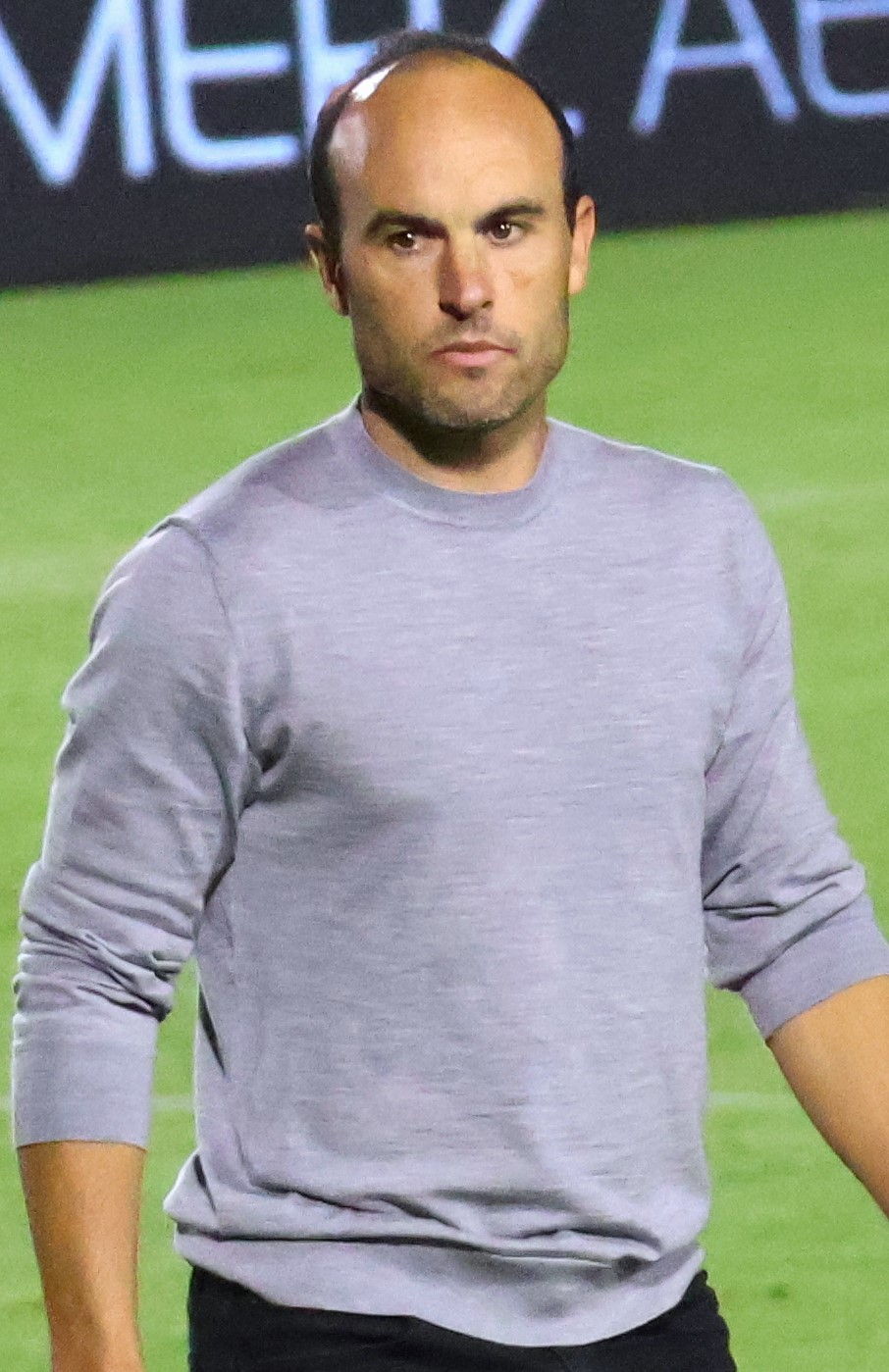
Landon Donovan

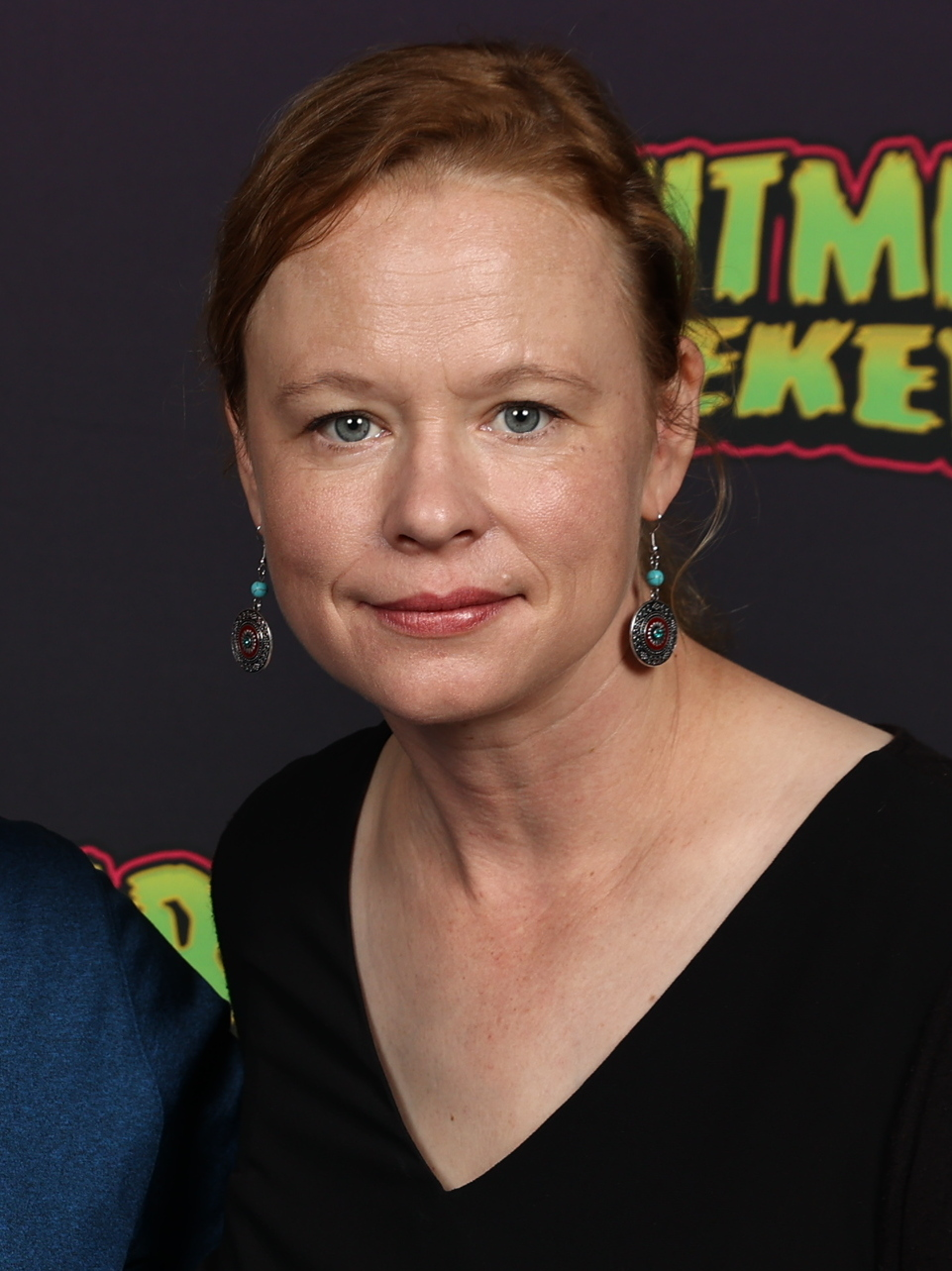
Thora Birch

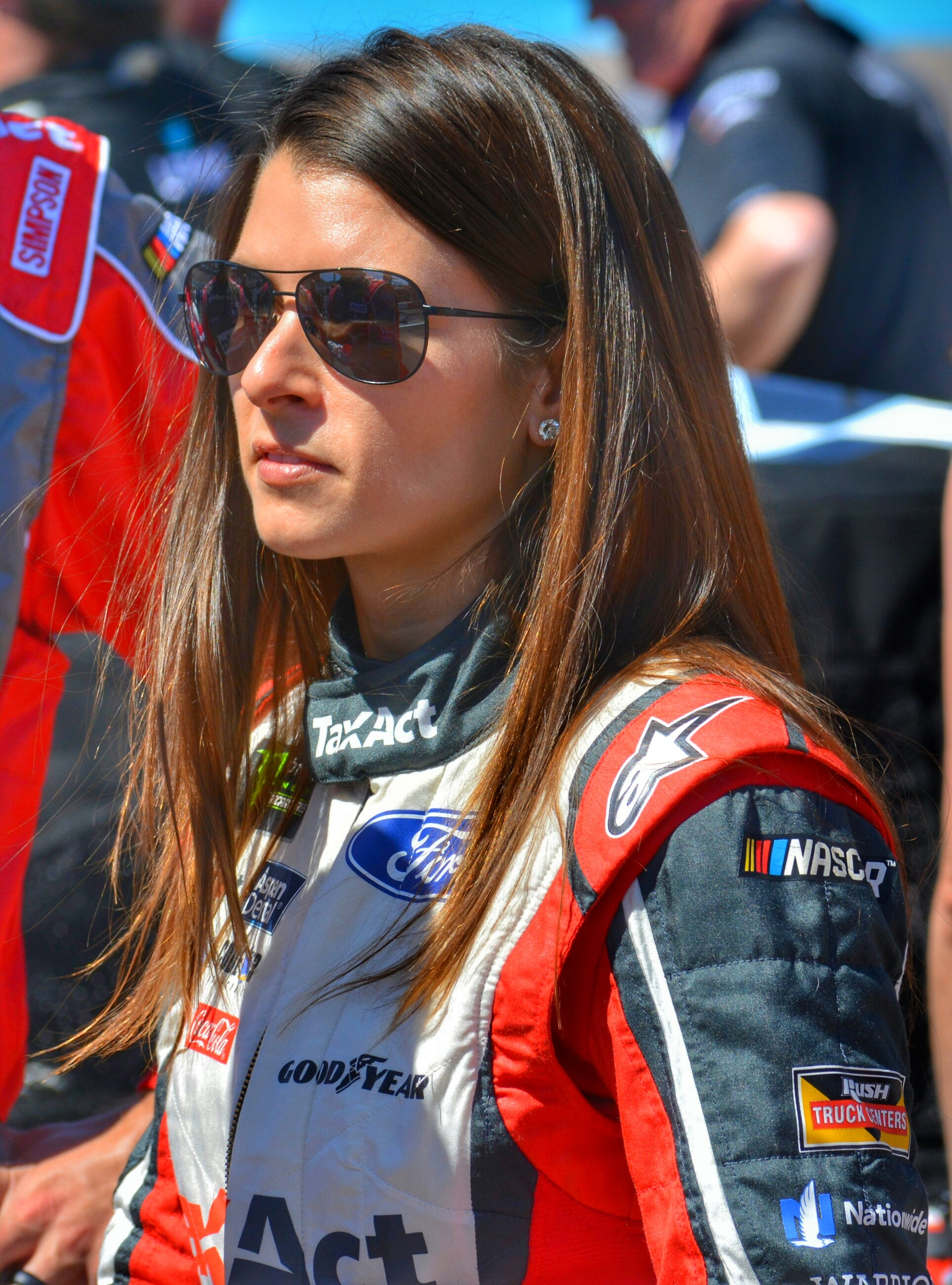
Danica Patrick

- March 1
  - Eugene Amano, football player
  - Brett Erlich, political comedian
  - Dominic Rains, Iranian-born actor
- March 2
  - Mike Nugent, football player
  - Ben Roethlisberger, football player
- March 3 – Jessica Biel, actress
- March 4 – Landon Donovan, soccer player
- March 8
  - Daniel Keem, YouTuber
  - Kat Von D, Mexican-born tattoo artist, reality television star, musician, and makeup artist
- March 10
  - Kwame Brown, basketball player
  - Tasha Butts, basketball player (d. 2023)
  - Dr DisRespect, streamer and internet personality
- March 11
  - Brian Anderson, baseball player
  - Thora Birch, actress and producer
  - Lindsey McKeon, actress
- March 12 – Samm Levine, actor, comedian, and podcaster
- March 15 – Bobby Boswell, soccer player
- March 18
  - Divya Narendra, businessman, co-founder and CEO of SumZero, and co-founder of ConnectU
  - Adam Pally, actor and comedian
- March 20
  - Chris August, Christian singer/songwriter
  - Robbie Lawler, mixed martial artist
- March 22 – Constance Wu, actress
- March 24 – Nivea, singer
- March 25
  - Sean Faris, actor
  - Alex Moffat, actor and comedian
  - Danica Patrick, race car driver
  - Jenny Slate, actress and comedian
- March 27 – Iman Crosson, actor
- March 28 – Pat Ryan, politician
- March 30 – Jason Dohring, actor
- March 31
  - Calvin Armstrong, football player
  - Ryland Blackinton, guitarist and vocalist for Cobra Starship
  - Brian Tyree Henry, actor
  - Falk Hentschel, German-born actor, dancer, and choreographer
  - Chloé Zhao, Chinese-born film director

=== April ===
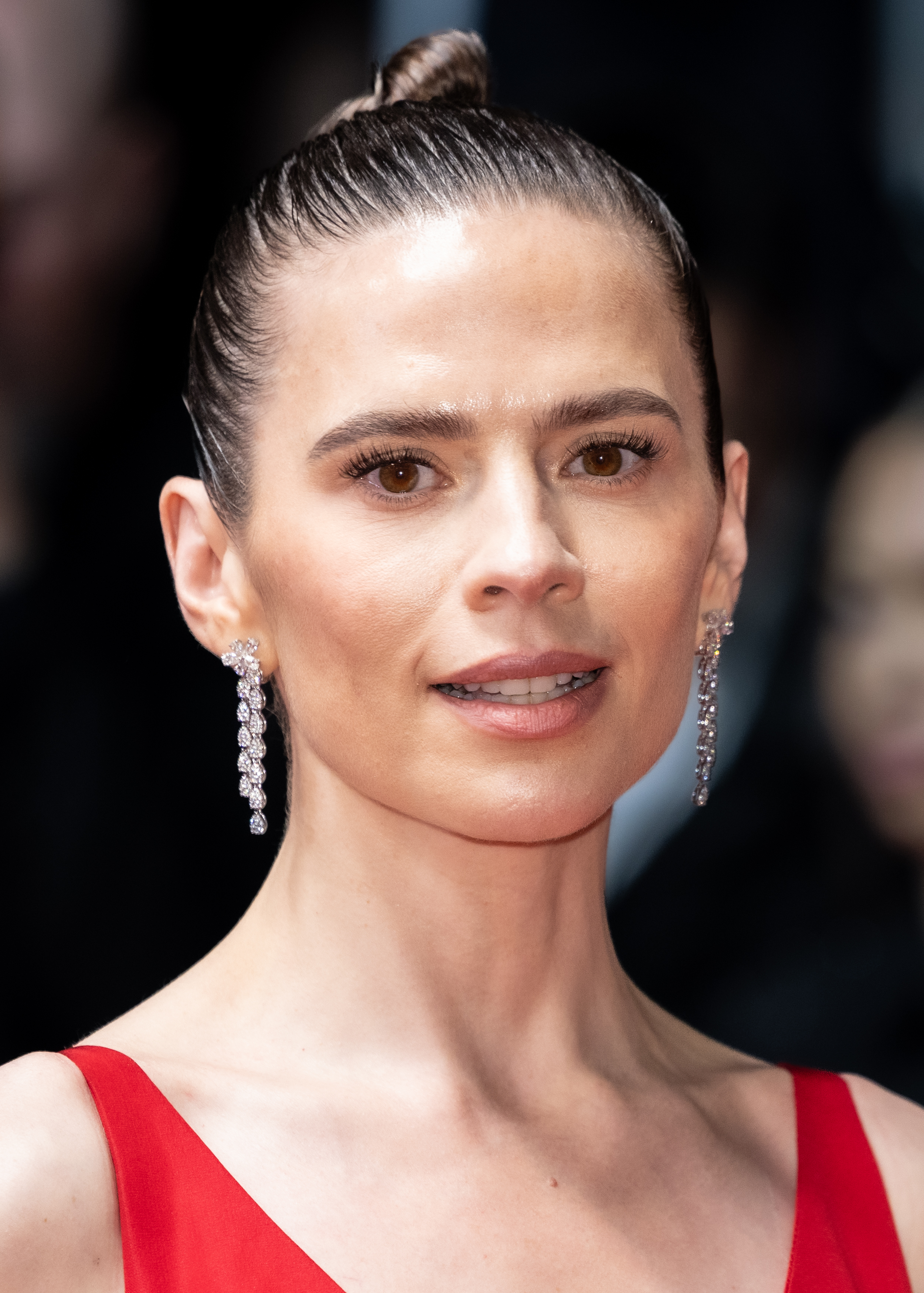
Hayley Atwell

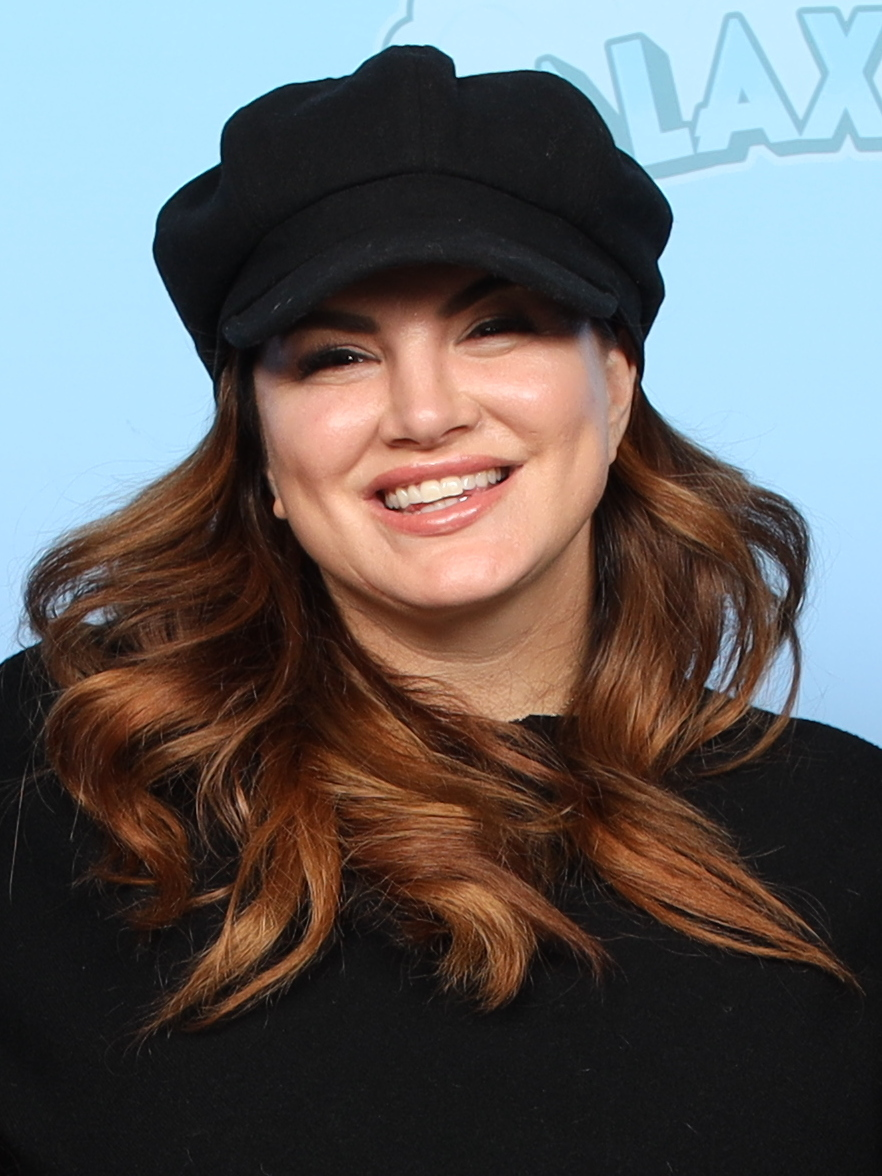
Gina Carano

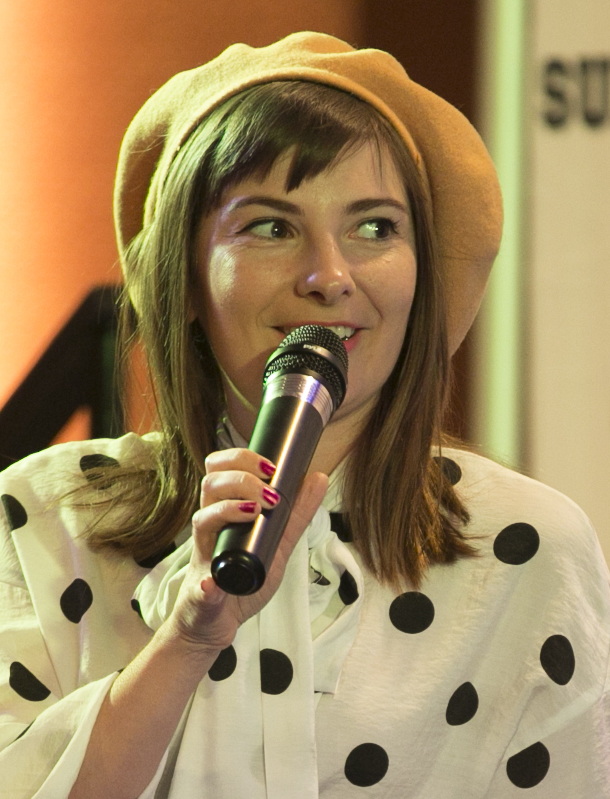
Cassandra Lee Morris

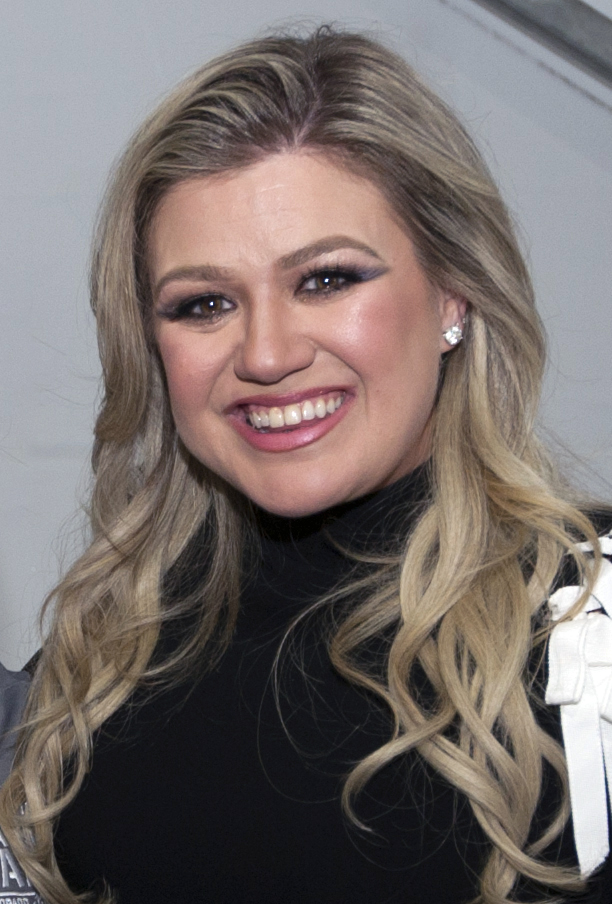
Kelly Clarkson

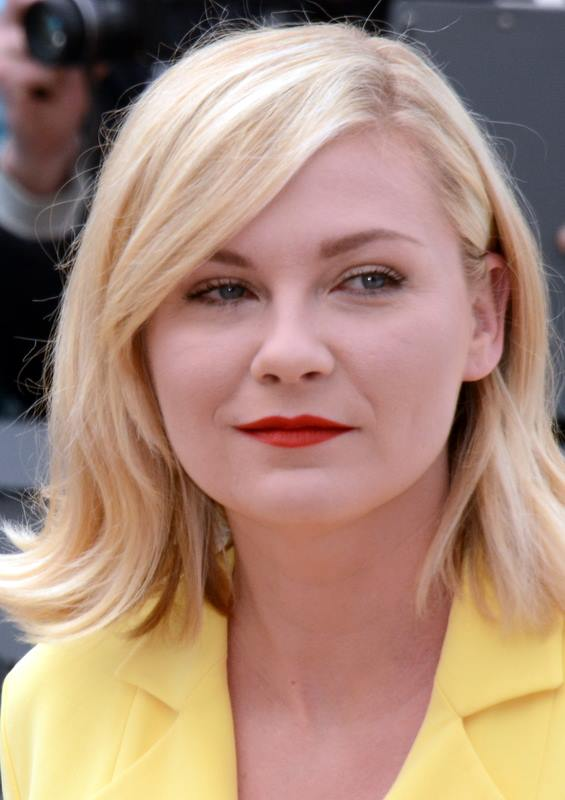
Kirsten Dunst

- April 1
  - Sam Huntington, actor
  - Taran Killam, actor, comedian, and writer
- April 3
  - Jared Allen, football player
- April 4 – Justin Cook, voice actor
- April 5
  - Wendy Allen, softball player
  - Hayley Atwell, British-born actress
  - Matt Pickens, soccer player
- April 6
  - Aqua, record producer and composer
  - Alana Austin, actress
  - Bret Harrison, actor and singer
- April 7
  - Sonjay Dutt, Indian-born wrestler
  - Tyron Woodley, mixed martial artist
- April 10 – Chyler Leigh, actress
- April 12 – Easton Corbin, country singer
- April 13 – Ty Dolla $ign, singer/songwriter, rapper, and record producer
- April 14 – Neil Anderson, politician
- April 15
  - Mike Anchondo, boxer
  - Michael Aubrey, baseball player
  - Anthony Green, singer/songwriter
  - Tommy Vext, singer/songwriter and frontman for Bad Wolves, Divine Heresy, and Westfield Massacre
- April 16
  - Gina Carano, actress, television personality, fitness model, and mixed martial artist
  - Joe Doering, wrestler (d. 2026)
- April 17
  - Aja Brown, politician
  - Tyron Woodley, mixed martial artist
- April 19
  - Shotti, record executive
  - Cassandra Lee Morris, voice actress
- April 21
  - Chagmion Antoine, broadcast journalist
  - Claybourne Elder, actor, singer, and writer
- April 23
  - Kyle Beckerman, soccer player
  - Justin Woodward, chef (d. 2025)
- April 24 – Kelly Clarkson, singer and American Idol winner
- April 26
  - Benjamin Arthur, animator
  - Brock Gillespie, basketball player
  - Cooper Wallace, football player
- April 28
  - Michael Carbonaro, television personality, actor, host, magician, and improv artist
  - Donna Feldman, model and actress
  - Nikko Smith, singer
  - Travis Smith, drummer for Trivium (1999–2009)
  - Kelly Thiebaud, actress and model
- April 30
  - Lloyd Banks, rapper
  - Kirsten Dunst, actress, singer, and model

=== May ===
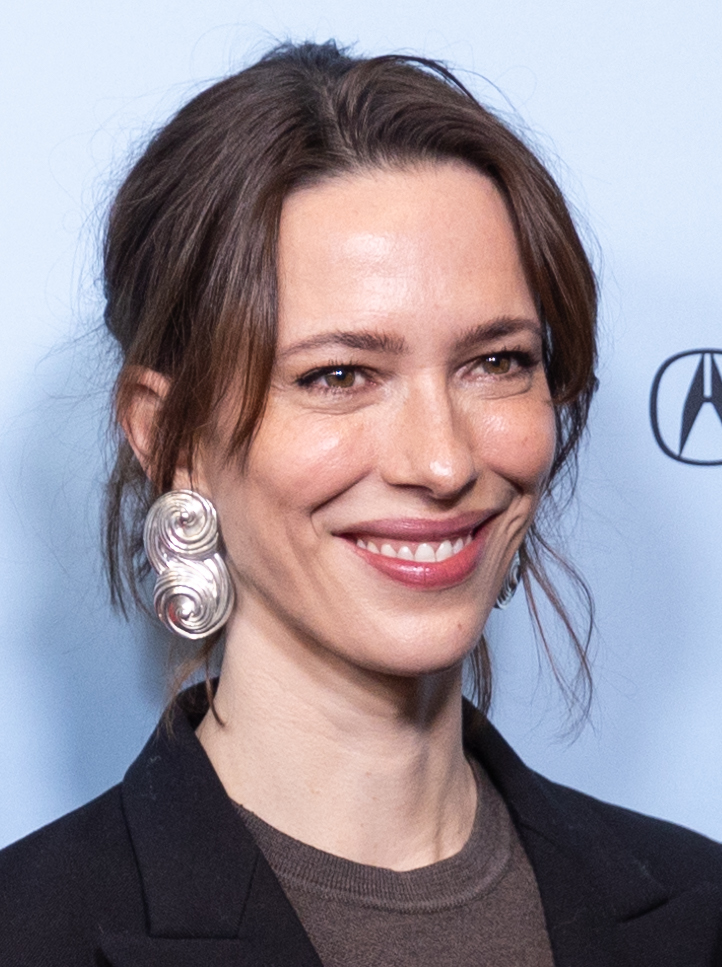
Rebecca Hall

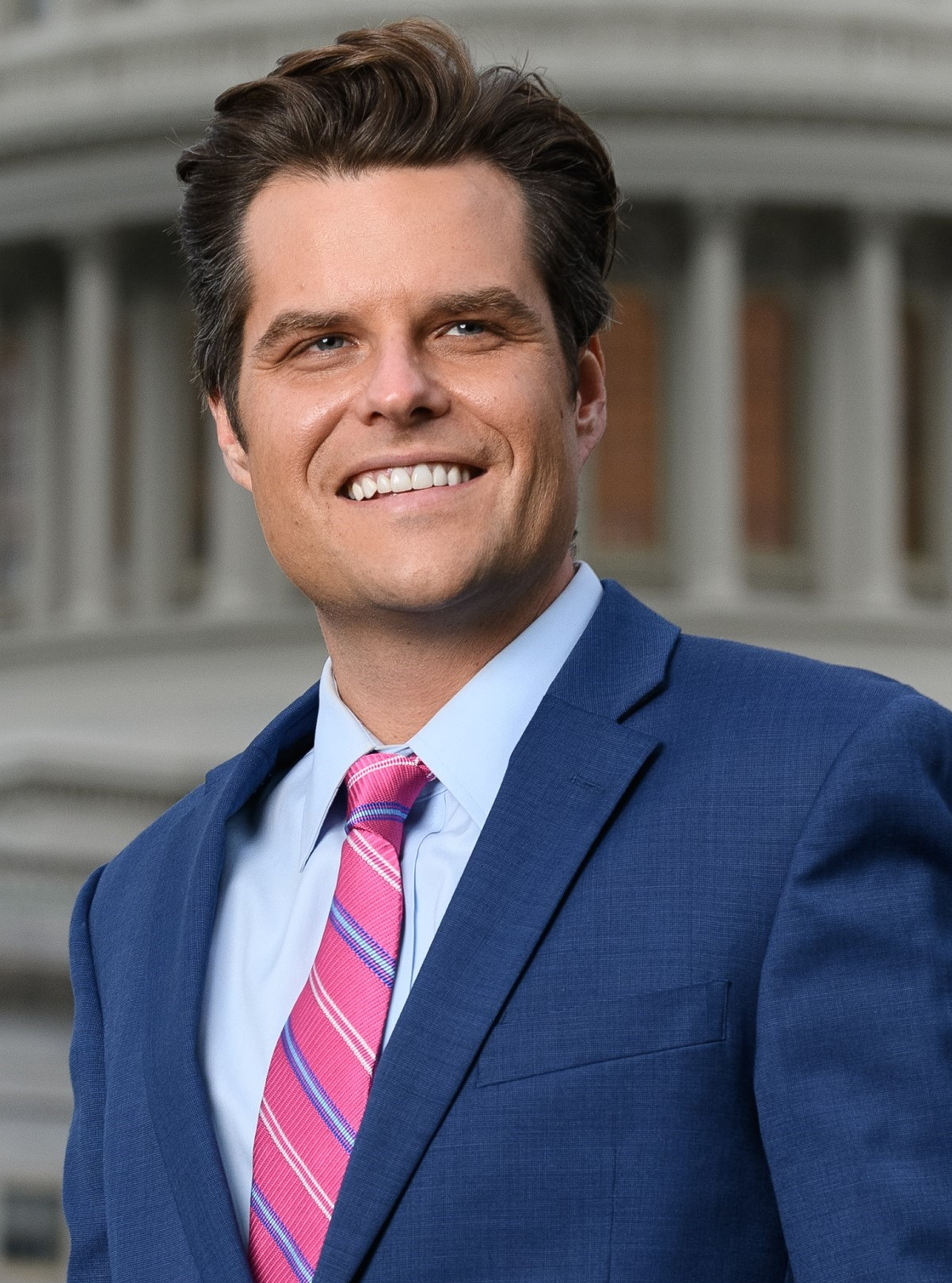
Matt Gaetz

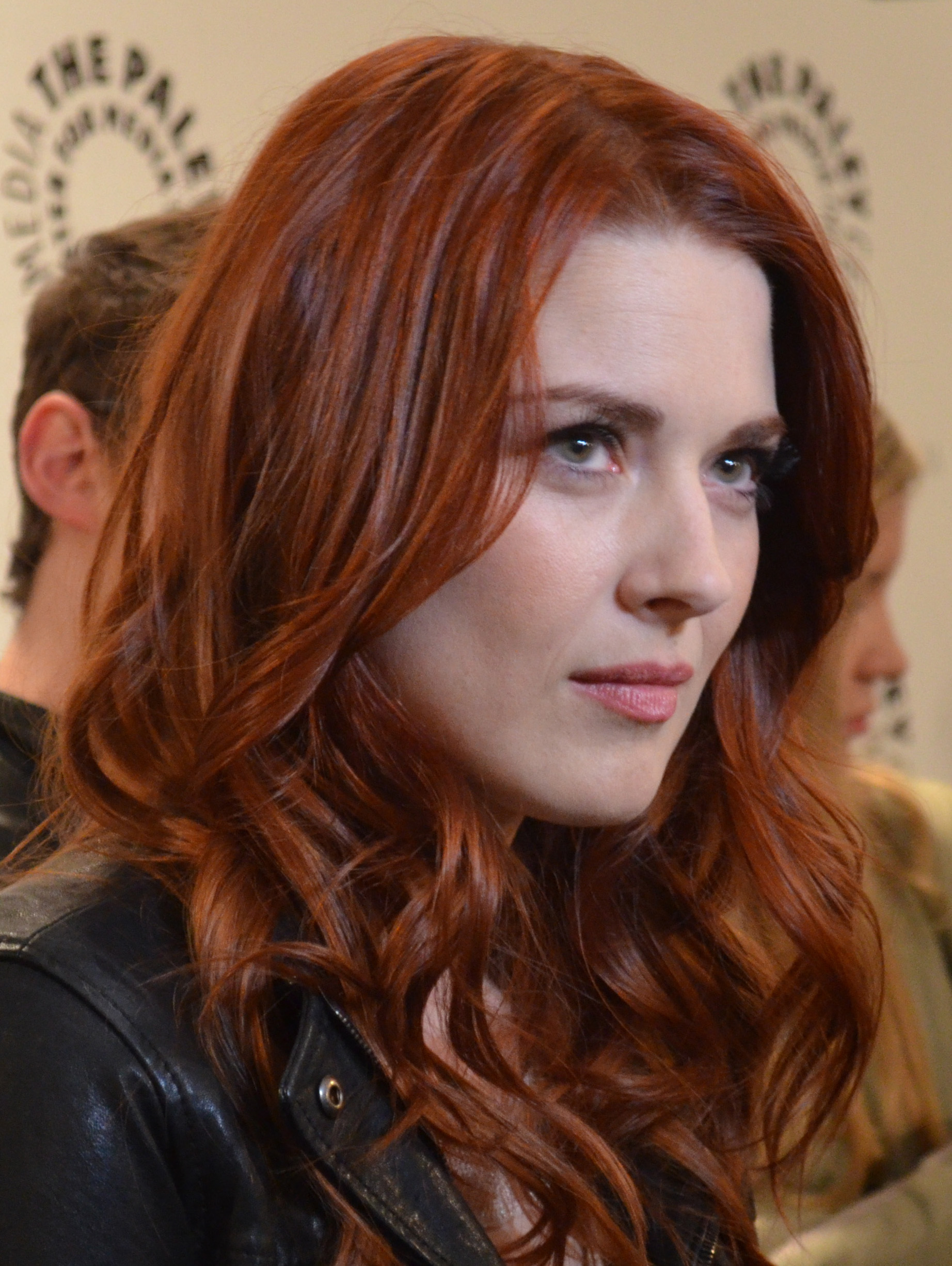
Alexandra Breckenridge

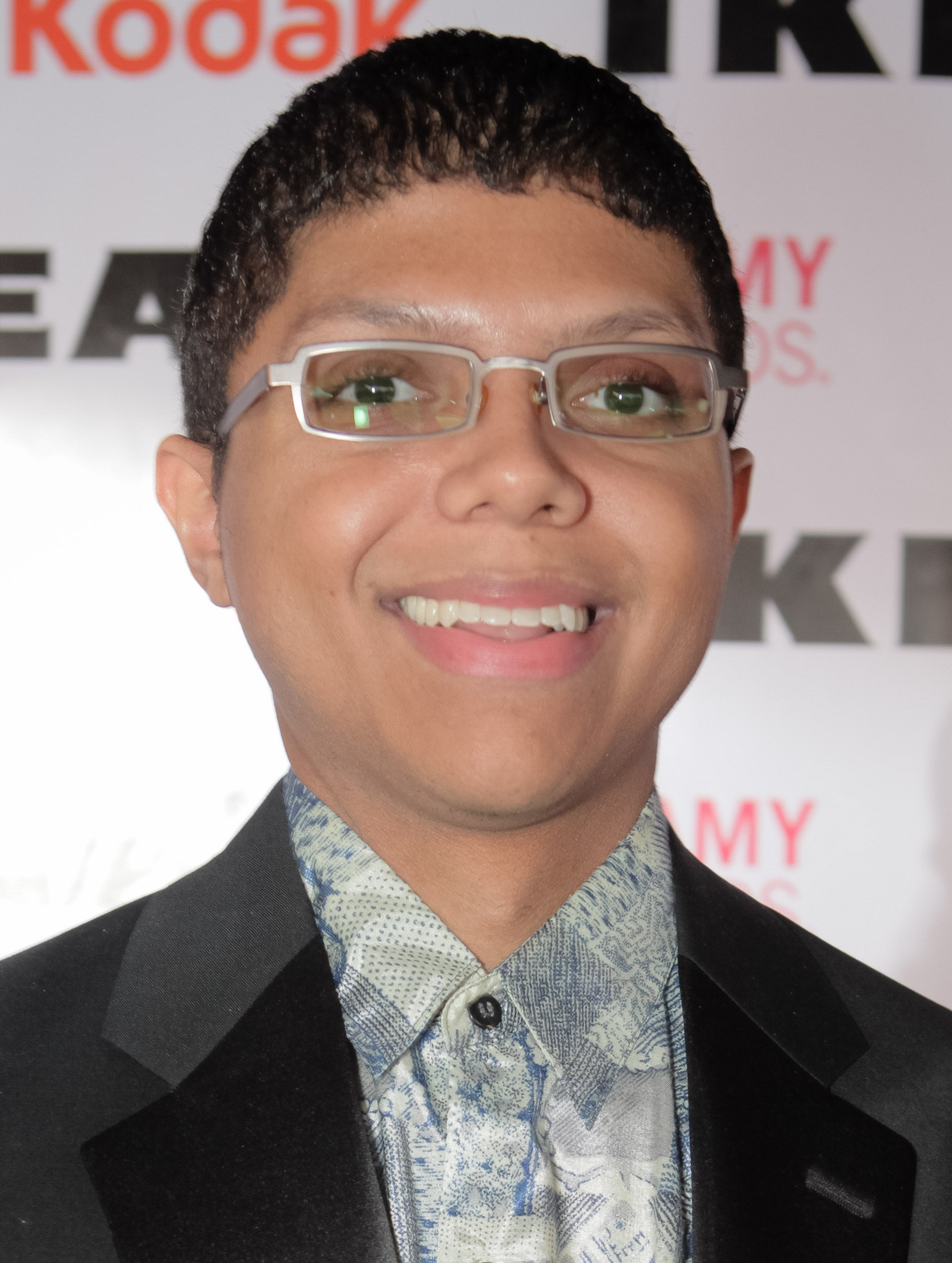
Tay Zonday

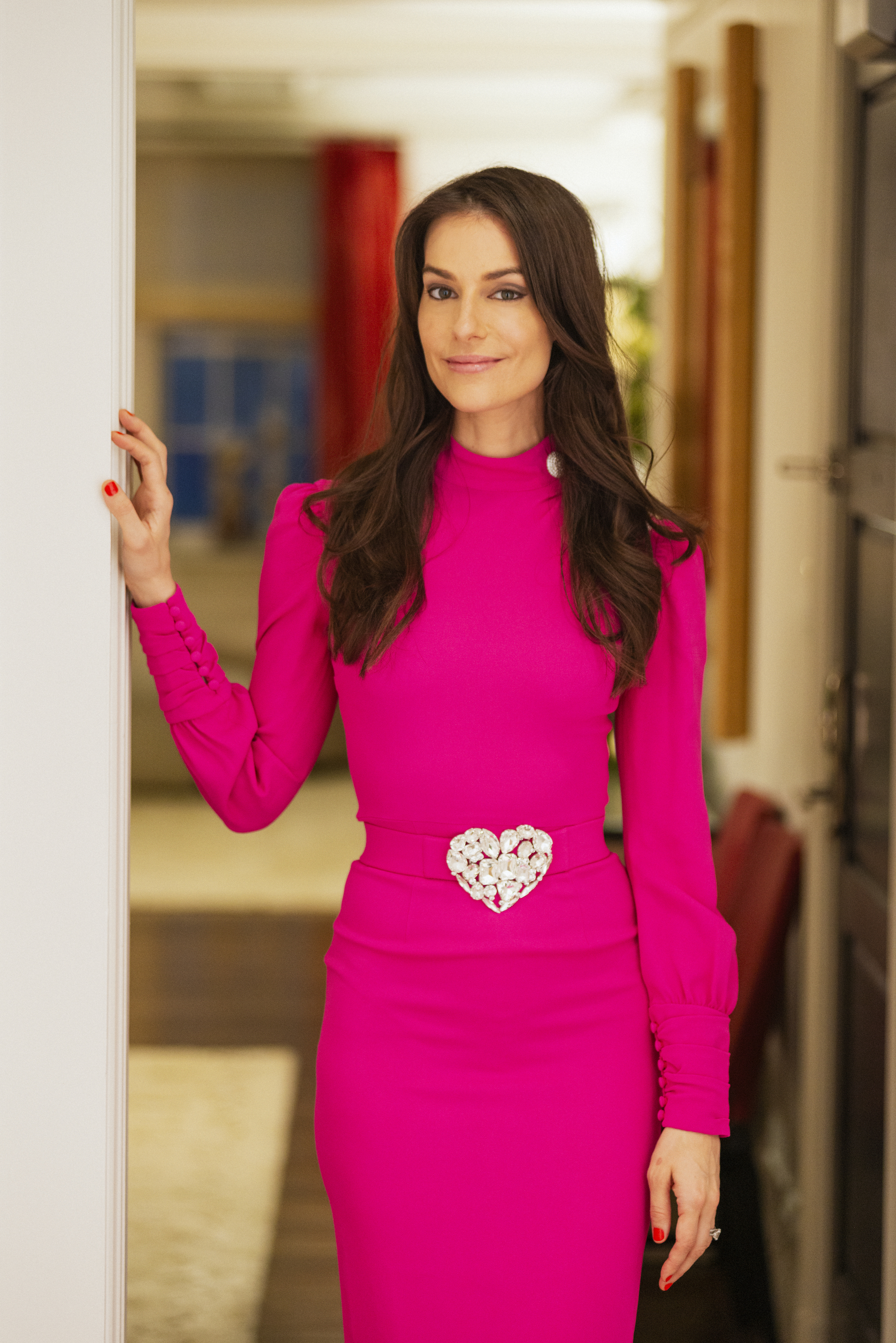
Ariana Rockefeller

- May 1 – Rob Finnerty, news anchor and host
- May 2 – Mark Adamek, ice hockey player
- May 3
  - Danielle Deadwyler, actress
  - Rebecca Hall, British-born actress
- May 4 – Charissa Thompson, sportscaster and television host
- May 6 – Jason Witten, football player
- May 7 – Matt Gaetz, politician
- May 8
  - Jessica Aguilar, mixed martial artist
  - Kevin Stefanski, football player and coach
- May 9
  - Rachel Boston, actress
  - Lindsay Whalen, basketball player and coach
- May 11
  - Jonathan Jackson, actor, singer, and guitarist for Enation
  - Andrew Walter, football player
- May 12 – Mobolaji Akiode, American-born Nigerian basketball player
- May 13 – Oguchi Onyewu, soccer player
- May 14 – Anjelah Johnson, actress
- May 15
  - Alexandra Breckenridge, actress, voice actress, and photographer
  - Jessica Sutta, dancer and singer, member of The Pussycat Dolls
- May 16 – Tiya Sircar, actress
- May 17
  - Kaye Abad, actress
  - Jamie Kilstein, media personality
  - Tony Parker, Belgian-born French-American basketball player
- May 18
  - Andrea Armstrong, basketball player
  - David Hallberg, ballet dancer
- May 20
  - Jack Anthony, singer/songwriter, composer, and musician
  - Candace Bailey, actress and television personality
  - Sierra Boggess, theater actress
- May 21 – Tay Zonday, singer
- May 22
  - Kyle Andrews, indie rock songwriter
  - Apolo Ohno, Olympic short track speed skater and actor
- May 24 – Cody Hanson, drummer for Hinder
- May 26
  - Joe Cunningham, politician
  - Ariana Rockefeller, heiress and model
- May 27
  - Natalya Neidhart, pro wrestler
  - Arthur Smith, American football coach
- May 28 – Alexa Davalos, actress
- May 29 – Joanne Borgella, singer and TV personality (d. 2014)
- May 30 – Eddie Griffin, basketball player (d. 2007)
- May 31 – Casey James, singer, guitarist, and American Idol contestant

=== June ===
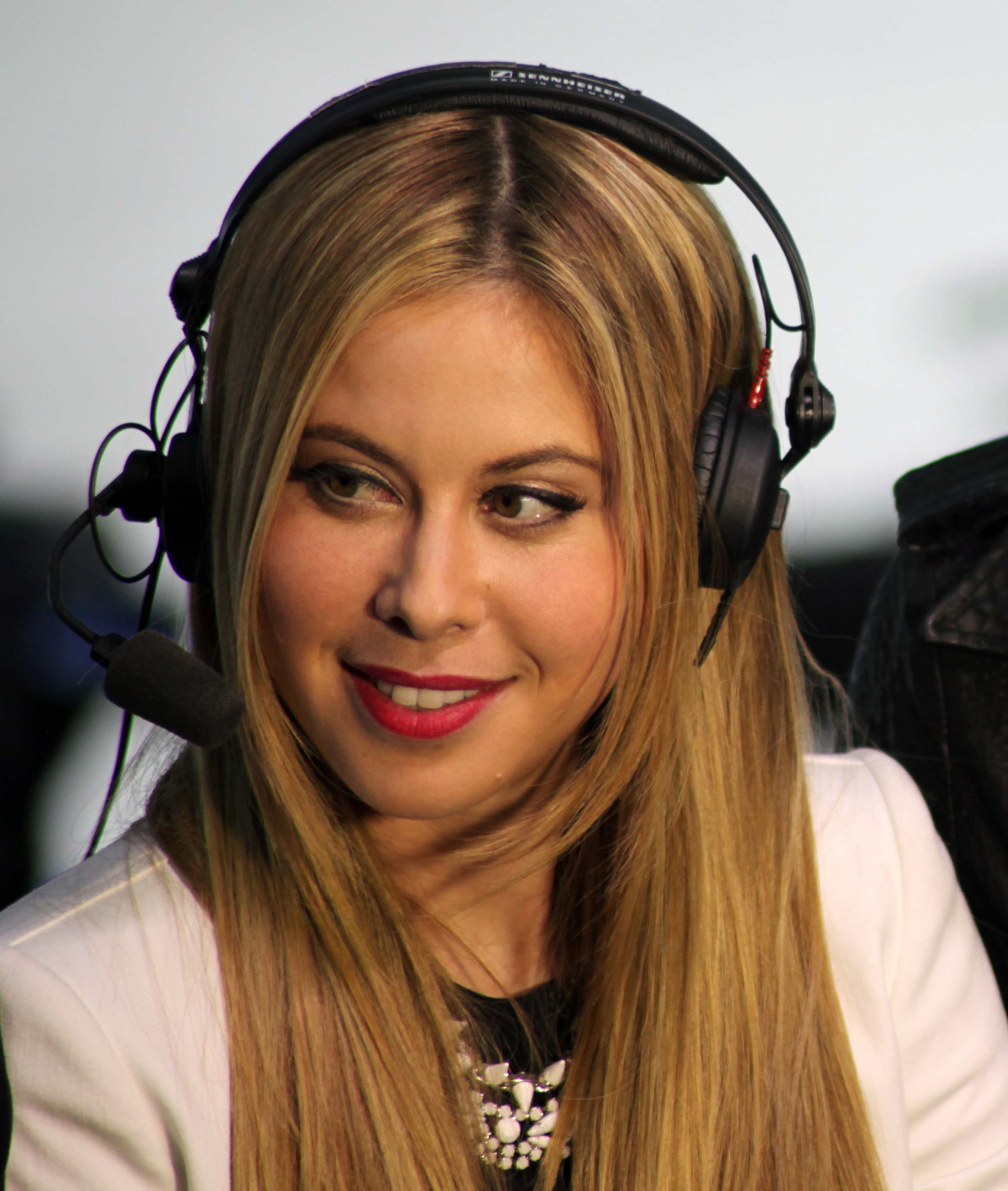
Tara Lipinski

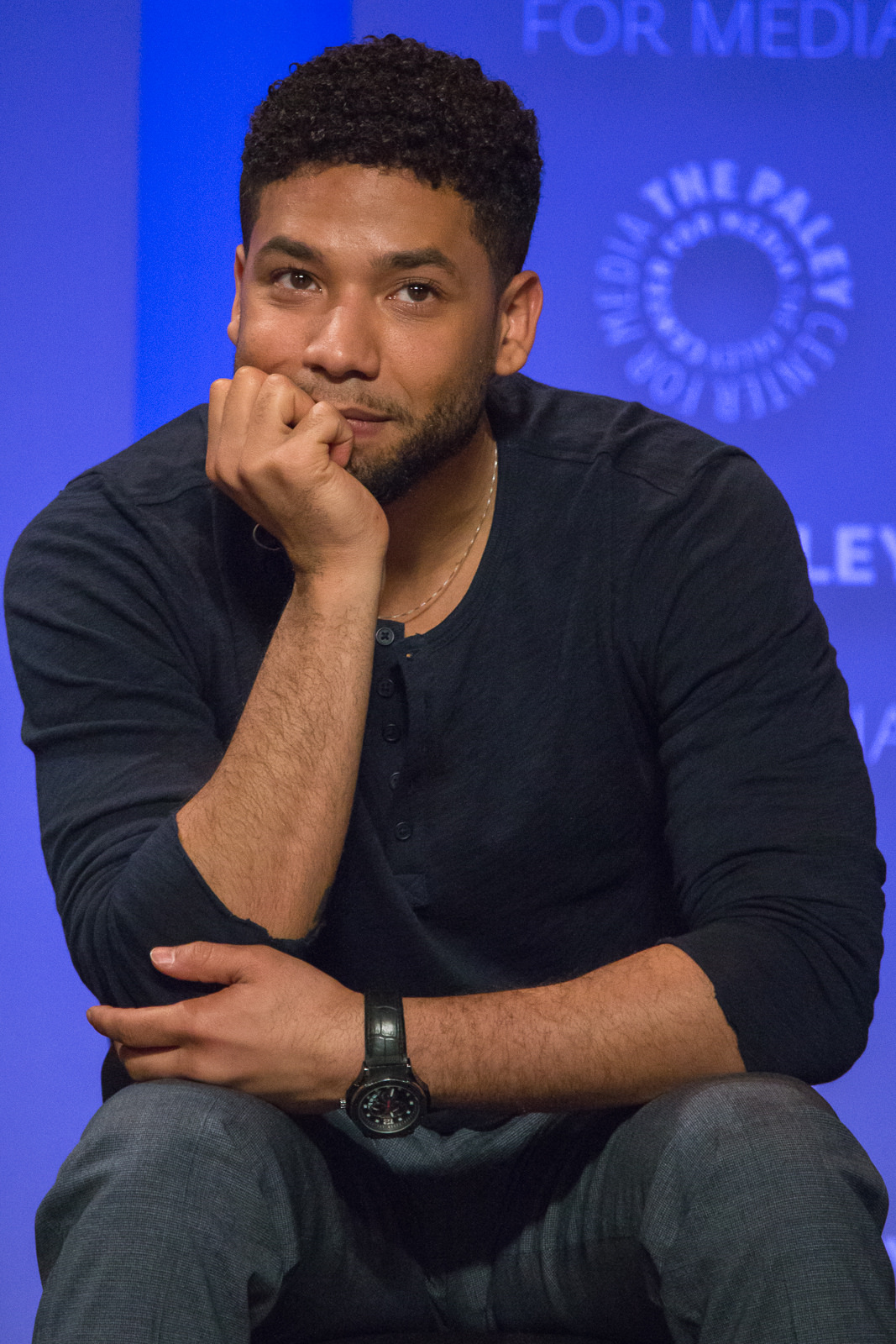
Jussie Smollett

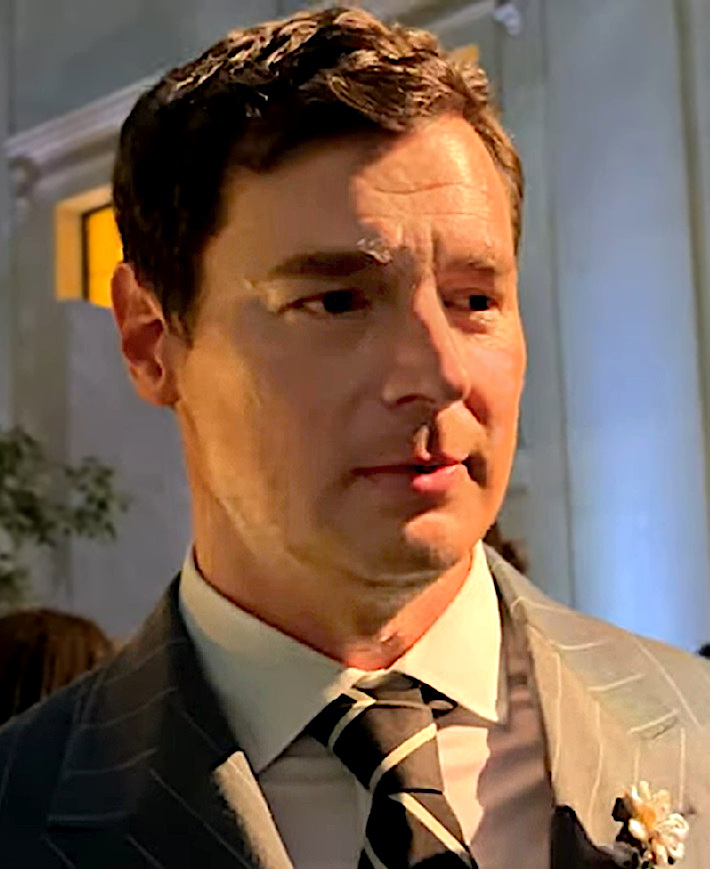
Benjamin Walker

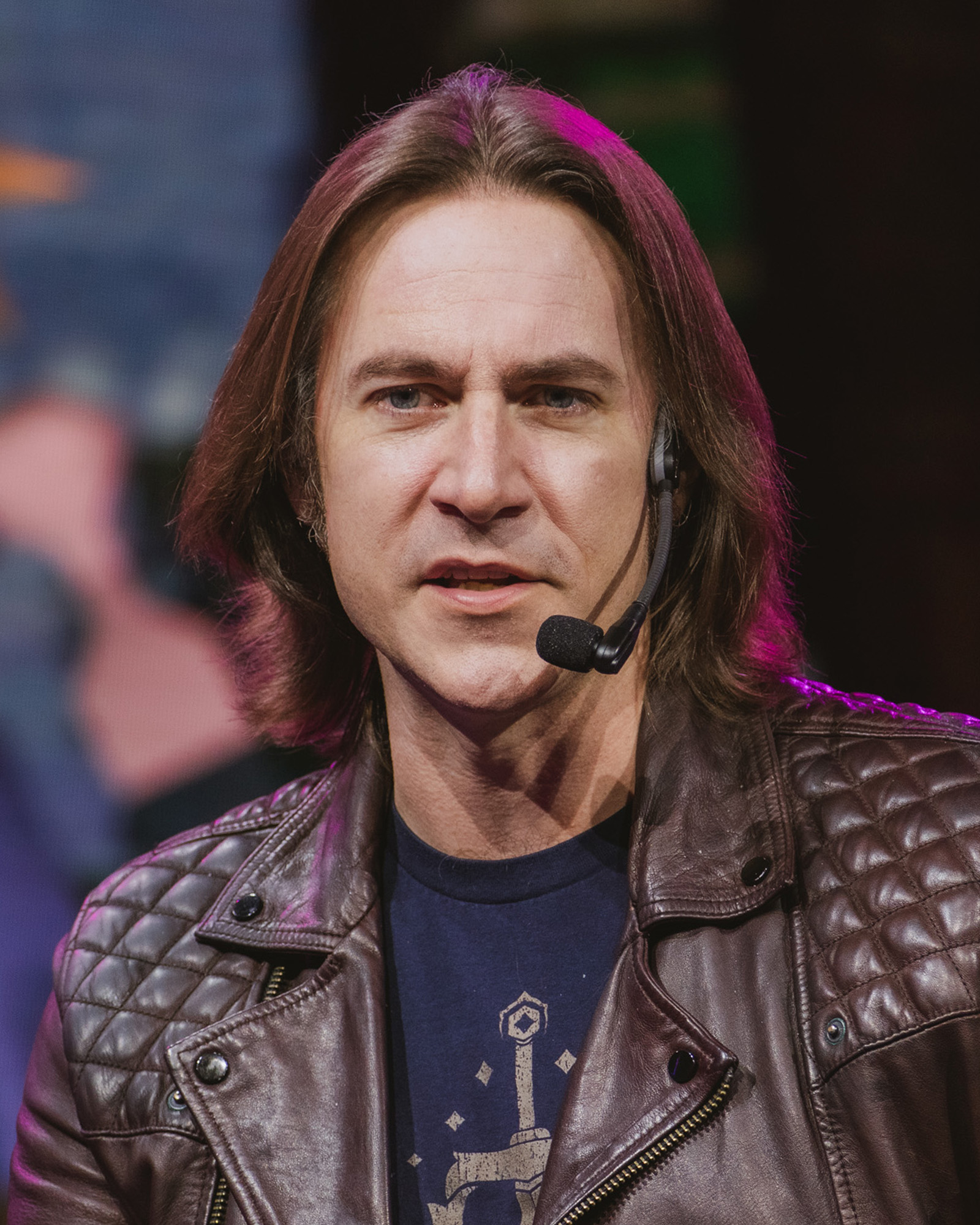
Matthew Mercer

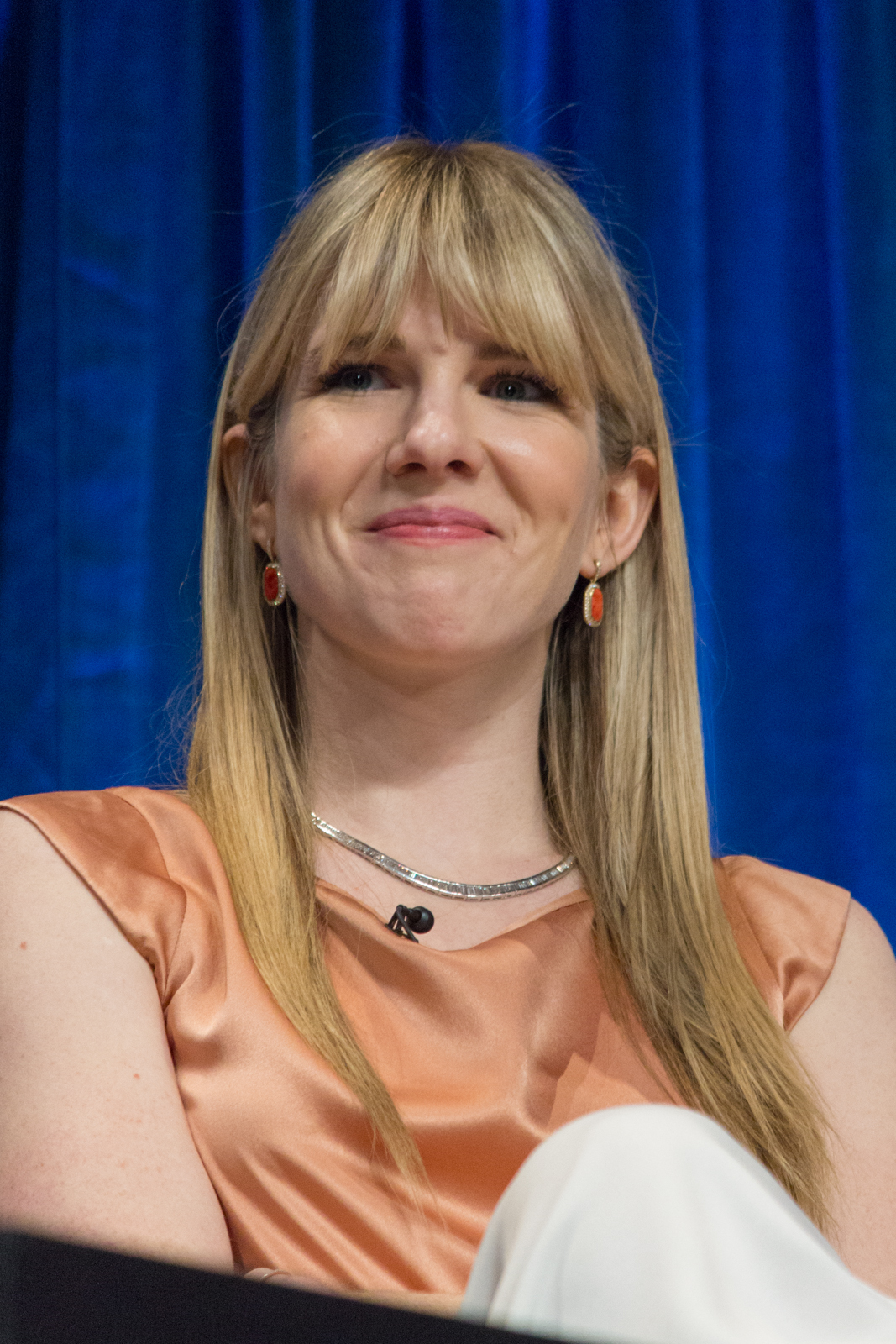
Lily Rabe

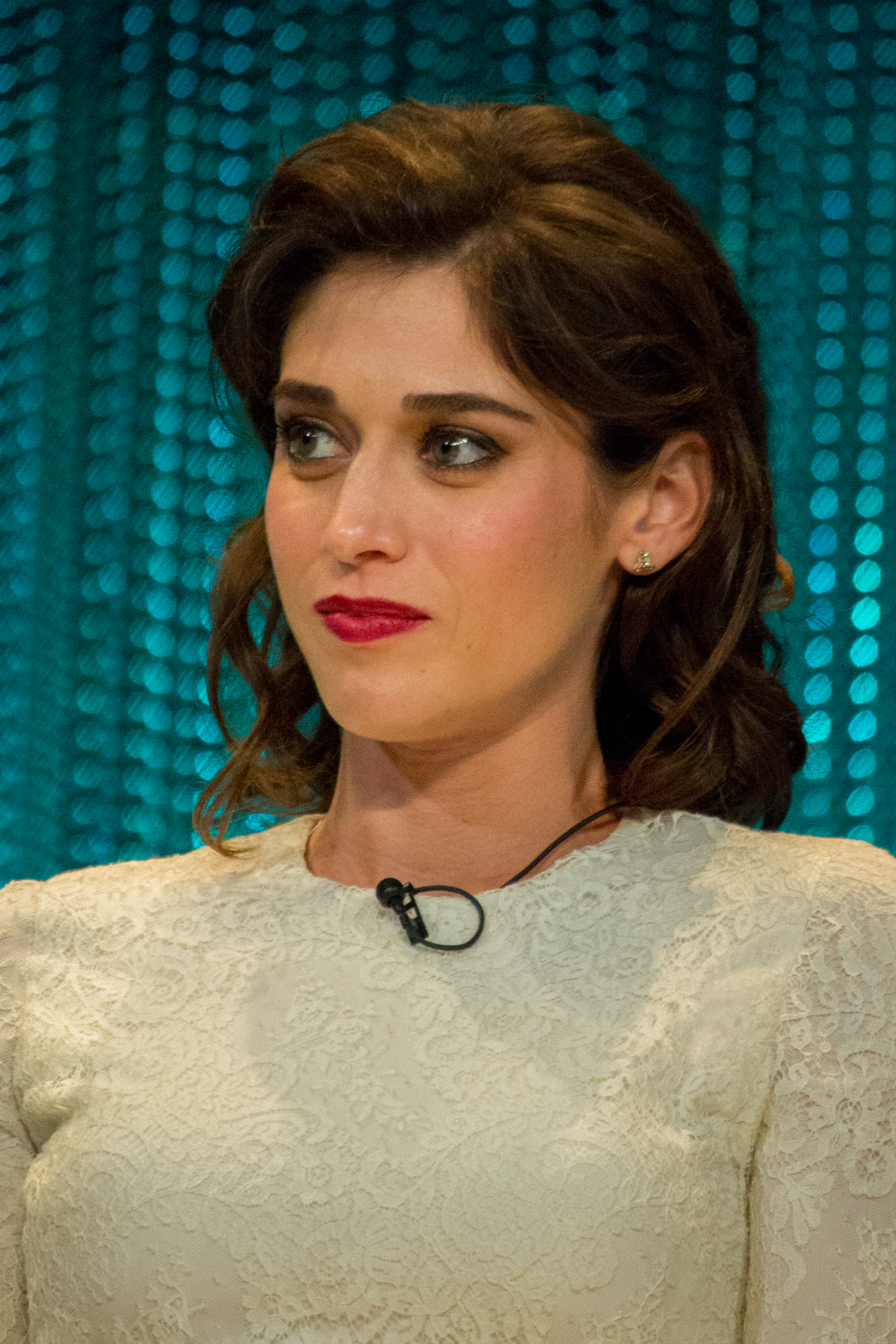
Lizzy Caplan

- June 2 – Whitney Able, actress and model
- June 4
  - Sasha Allen, singer and actress
  - MC Jin, rapper
- June 6 – Jaxson Ryker, wrestler
- June 7
  - 12th Planet, dubstep producer and DJ
  - Virgil Vasquez, baseball player
- June 8 – Josh Pence, actor
- June 9 – Jacqueline Coleman, politician, 58th Lieutenant Governor of Kentucky
- June 10 – Tara Lipinski, figure skater
- June 11
  - Marco Arment, businessman, co-creator of Tumblr
  - Johnny Candido, wrestler
  - Diana Taurasi, basketball player
- June 12
  - Ben Blackwell, drummer
  - Artem Chigvintsev, Russian-American dancer
  - Jason David, football player
- June 13 – Nicole Galloway, politician
- June 14 – Freddie Gibbs, rapper
- June 15 – Haley Scarnato, singer
- June 16 – Chad Anderson, ice hockey player
- June 17 – Will Allen, football player
- June 19
  - David Pollack, football player
  - Michael Yarmush, American-born Canadian actor and voice actor
- June 21
  - Jussie Smollett, actor
  - Benjamin Walker, actor
- June 22
  - Johnny Bananas, television personality
  - Ian Kinsler, baseball player
- June 23
  - Steven Cheung, political adviser
  - Beau Kittredge, ultimate AUDL player
- June 25
  - La La Anthony, television personality, author, businesswoman, producer, and actress
  - Ryan Block, technology entrepreneur
- June 28 – Jason Tam, actor and dancer
- June 29
  - Matthew Mercer, voice actor, screenwriter, and director
  - James Mueller, politician, mayor of South Bend, Indiana (2020–present)
  - Lily Rabe, actress
- June 30
  - Lizzy Caplan, actress and model
  - Mitch Maier, baseball player
  - Delwyn Young, baseball player

=== July ===
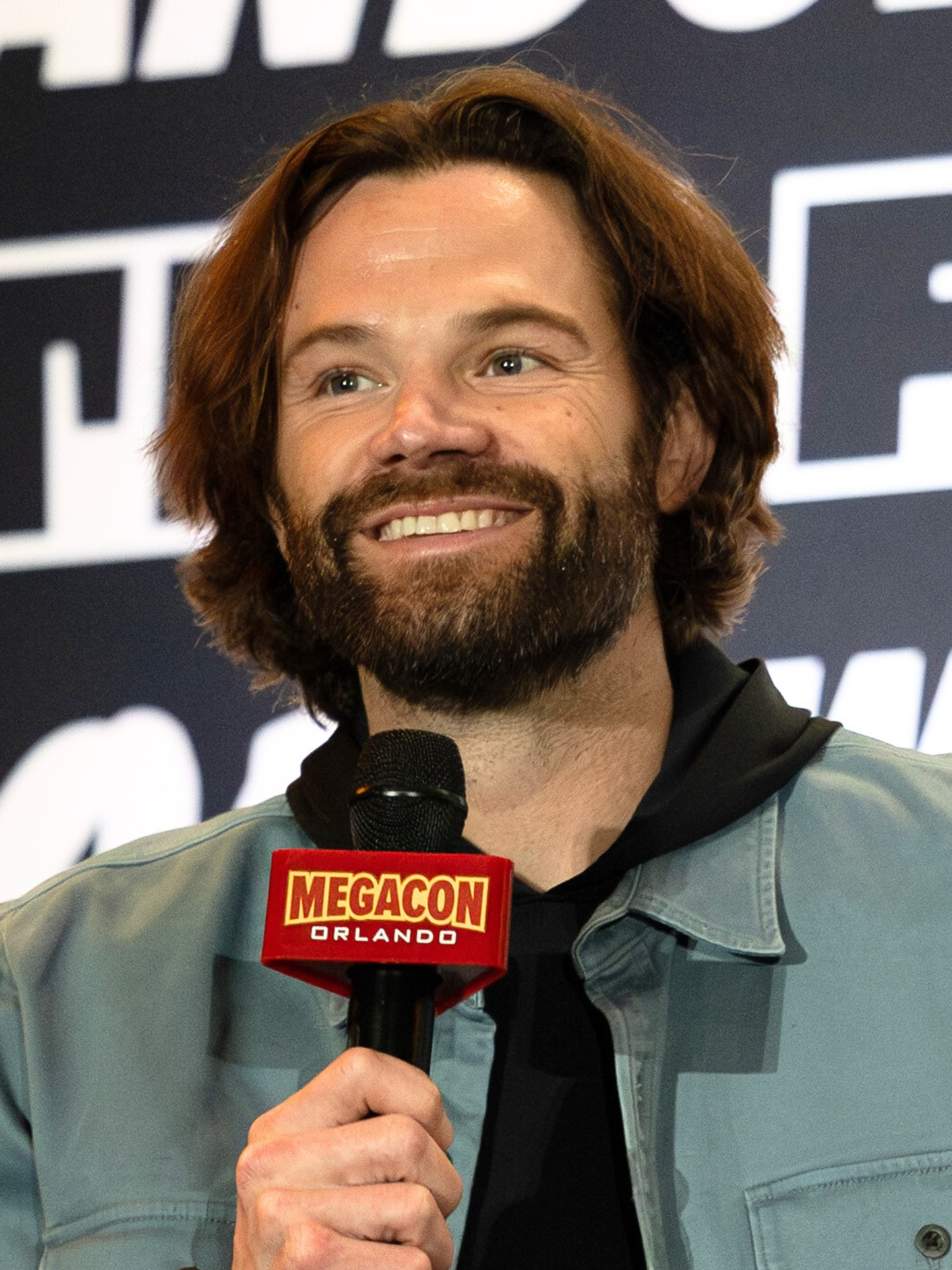
Jared Padalecki

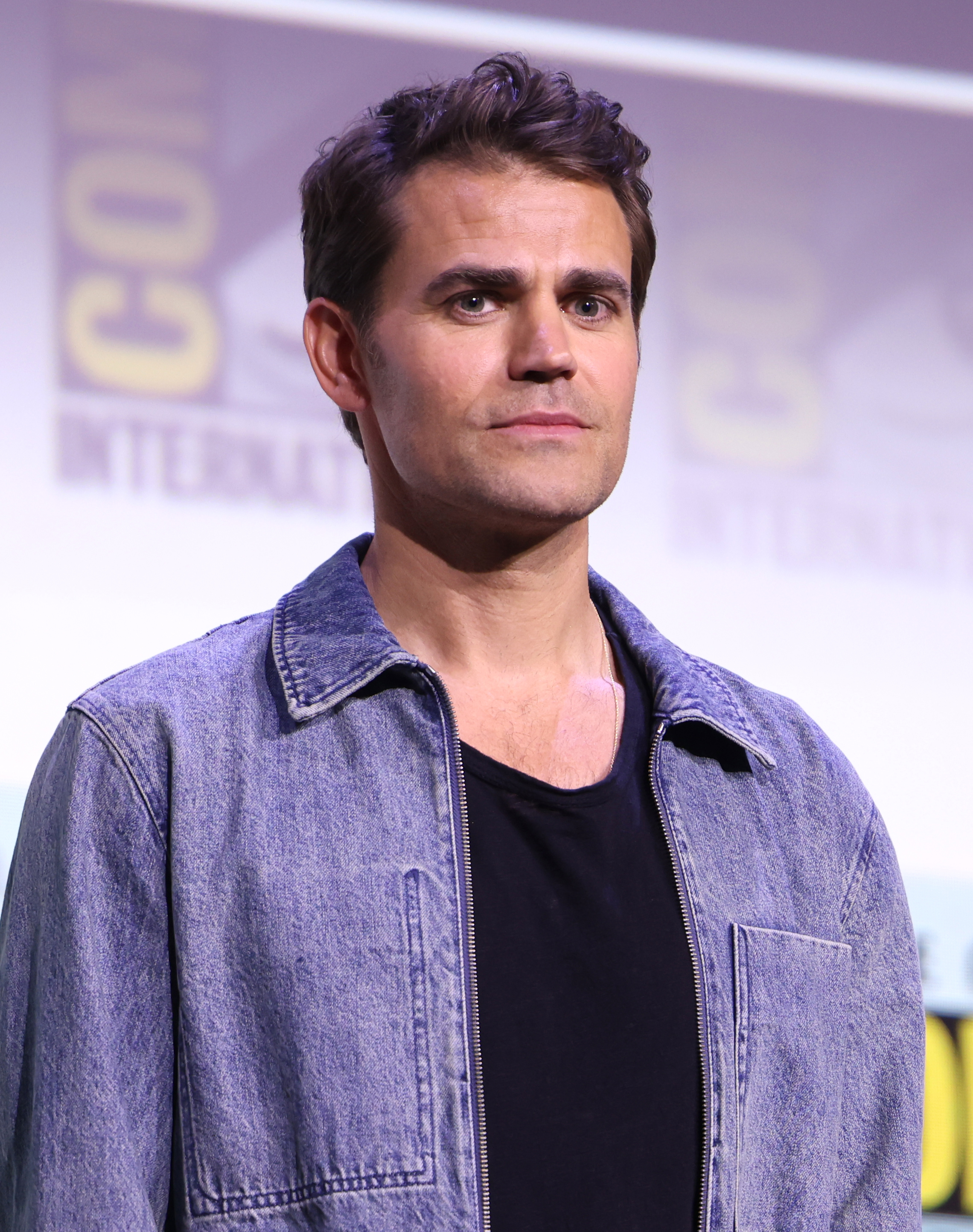
Paul Wesley

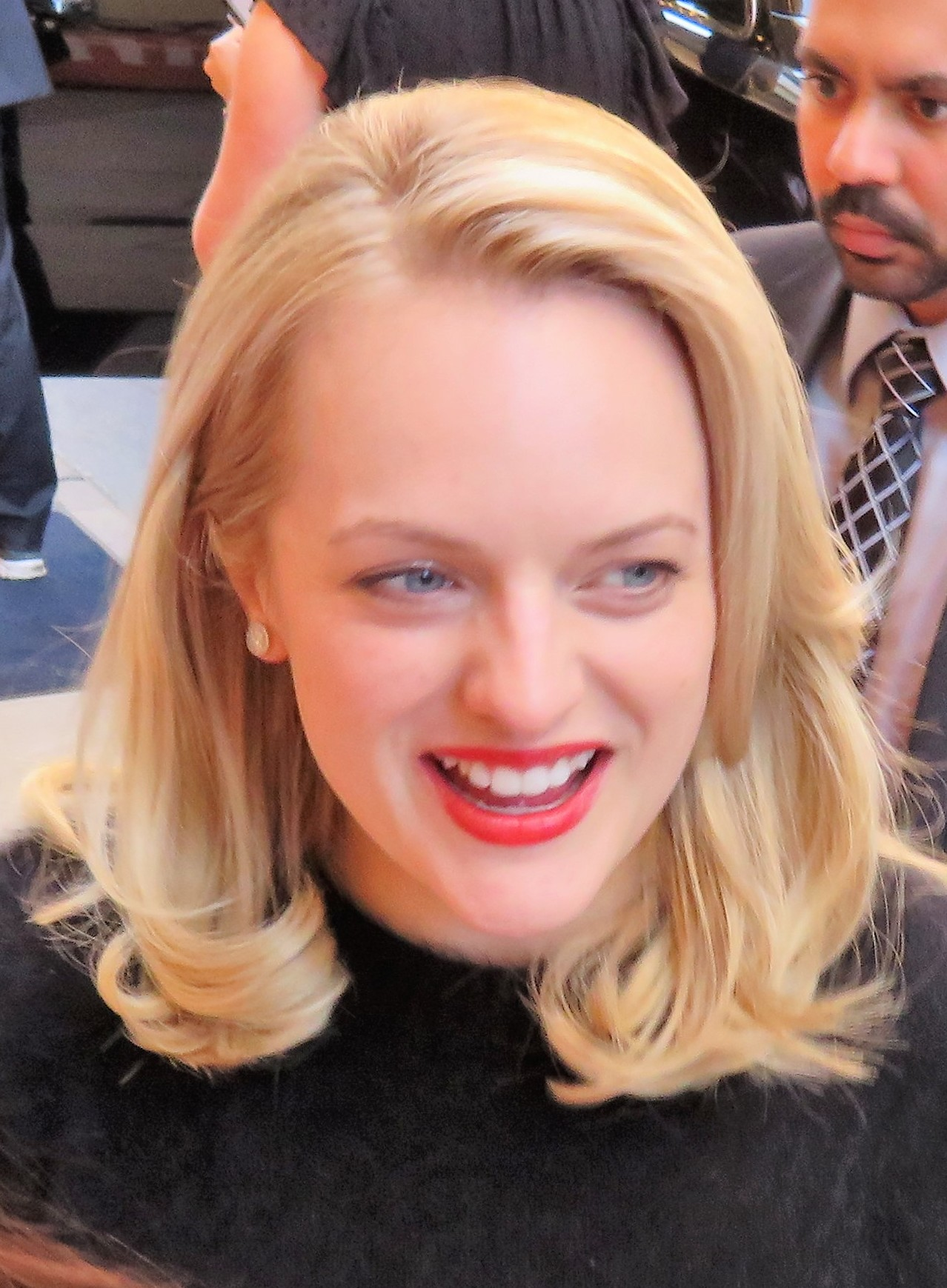
Elisabeth Moss

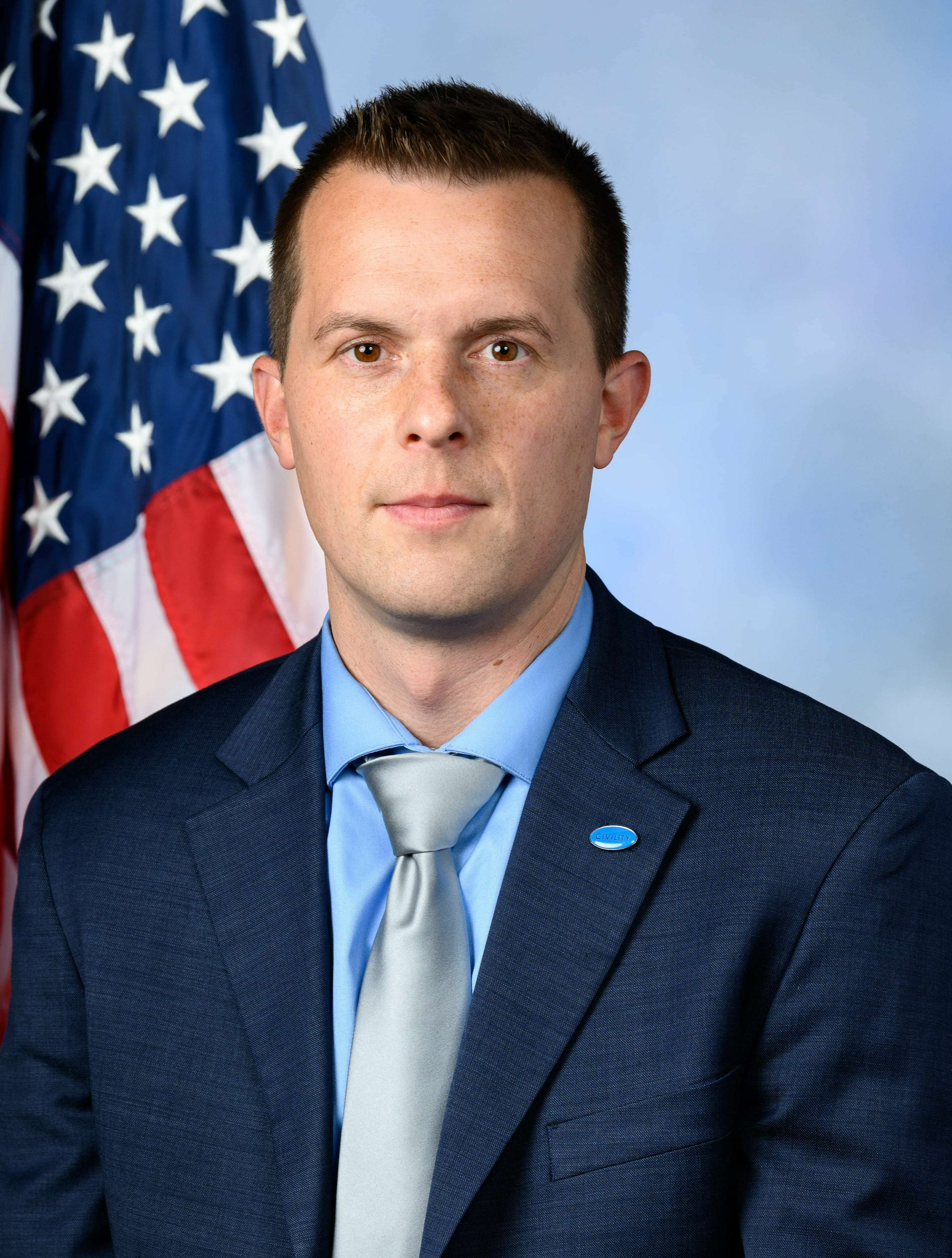
Jared Golden

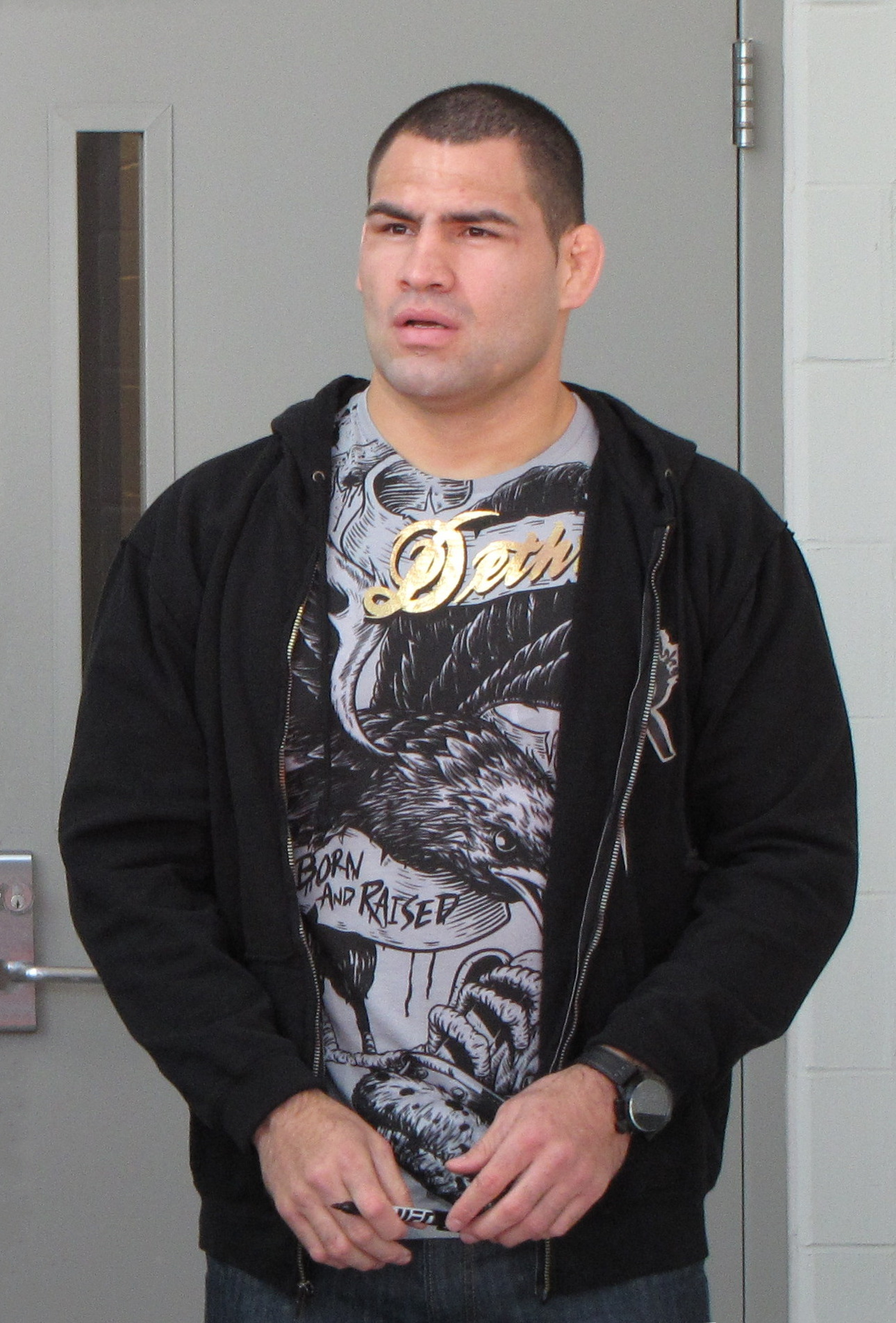
Cain Velasquez

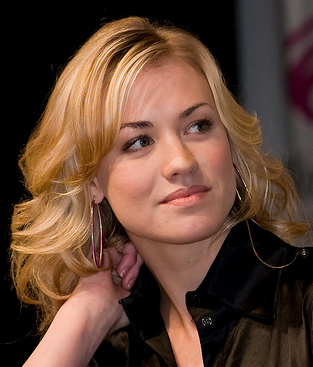
Yvonne Strahovski

- July 1
  - Matthias Askew, football player
  - Hilarie Burton, actress and producer
  - Carmella DeCesare, model and wrestler
- July 2
  - Ferras Alqaisi, singer/songwriter
  - Brontez Purnell, writer, musician, dancer, and director
  - Derek Yu, indie game designer, artist and blogger
- July 3 – Steph Jones, singer/songwriter
- July 4
  - Mo McRae, actor, writer, and producer
  - Mike 'The Situation' Sorrentino, model, actor, and author
- July 5
  - Monica Day, model and journalist
  - Dave Haywood, singer/songwriter and guitarist
- July 6
  - Nic Hudson, guitarist for Cartel
  - Brandon Jacobs, football player
  - Misty Upham, actress (d. 2014)
  - Tay Zonday, singer, musician, announcer, voice artist, actor, comedian and YouTube personality
- July 7 – C. J. Ah You, football player
- July 8
  - Sophia Bush, actress
  - Schuyler Fisk, actress and singer/songwriter
  - Ariel Helwani, combat sports pundit
  - Pendleton Ward, animator
  - Hakim Warrick, basketball player
- July 10
  - Alex Arrowsmith, rock/pop musician
  - Andrew Greer, singer/songwriter
- July 11 – Lil Zane, rapper
- July 12
  - Andy Kim, politician
  - Katie Wilson, politician and activist, mayor of Seattle, Washington
  - Jason Wright, football player, businessman, and executive
- July 13 – Brandon Whipple, politician, mayor of Wichita, Kansas (2020–2024)
- July 14 – Ben Silbermann, entrepreneur and co-founder of Pinterest
- July 16 – Kellie Wells, Olympic hurdler
- July 17 – Amanda Warren, actress
- July 18 – Ryan Cabrera, Colombian-born pop rock musician
- July 19 – Jared Padalecki, actor
- July 20 – Percy Daggs III, actor
- July 21 – Veronica Belmont, media personality
- July 23
  - Benjamin Hall, British-born journalist
  - Paul Wesley, actor
- July 24
  - George Hu, American-born Taiwanese actor and singer
  - Elisabeth Moss, actress
- July 25
  - Jared Golden, politician
  - Oneohtrix Point Never, producer and composer
  - Brad Renfro, actor (d. 2008)
- July 26 – Angel Acevedo, filmmaker
- July 27 – Wolé Parks, actor
- July 28
  - Willie Amos, football player
  - Tom Pelphrey, actor
  - Brandon Potter, actor, voice actor, and screenwriter
  - Chima Simone, television personality and journalist
  - Cain Velasquez, wrestler and mixed martial artist
- July 29 – Allison Mack, German-born actress
- July 30
  - Brandon Scott, actor
  - Martin Starr, actor and comedian
  - Yvonne Strahovski, actress
- July 31 – Jeff DaRosa, multi-instrumentalist for Dropkick Murphys

=== August ===
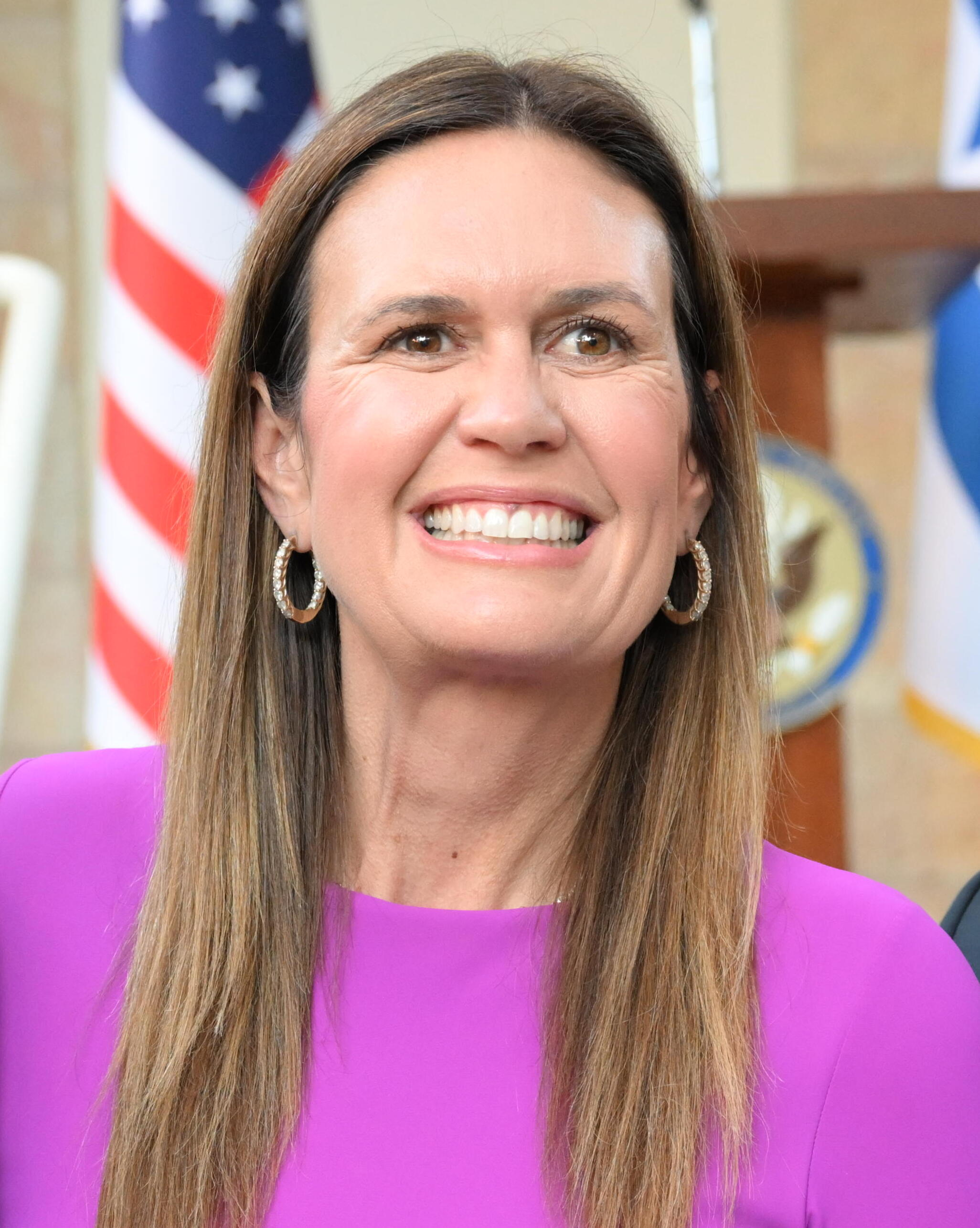
Sarah Huckabee Sanders

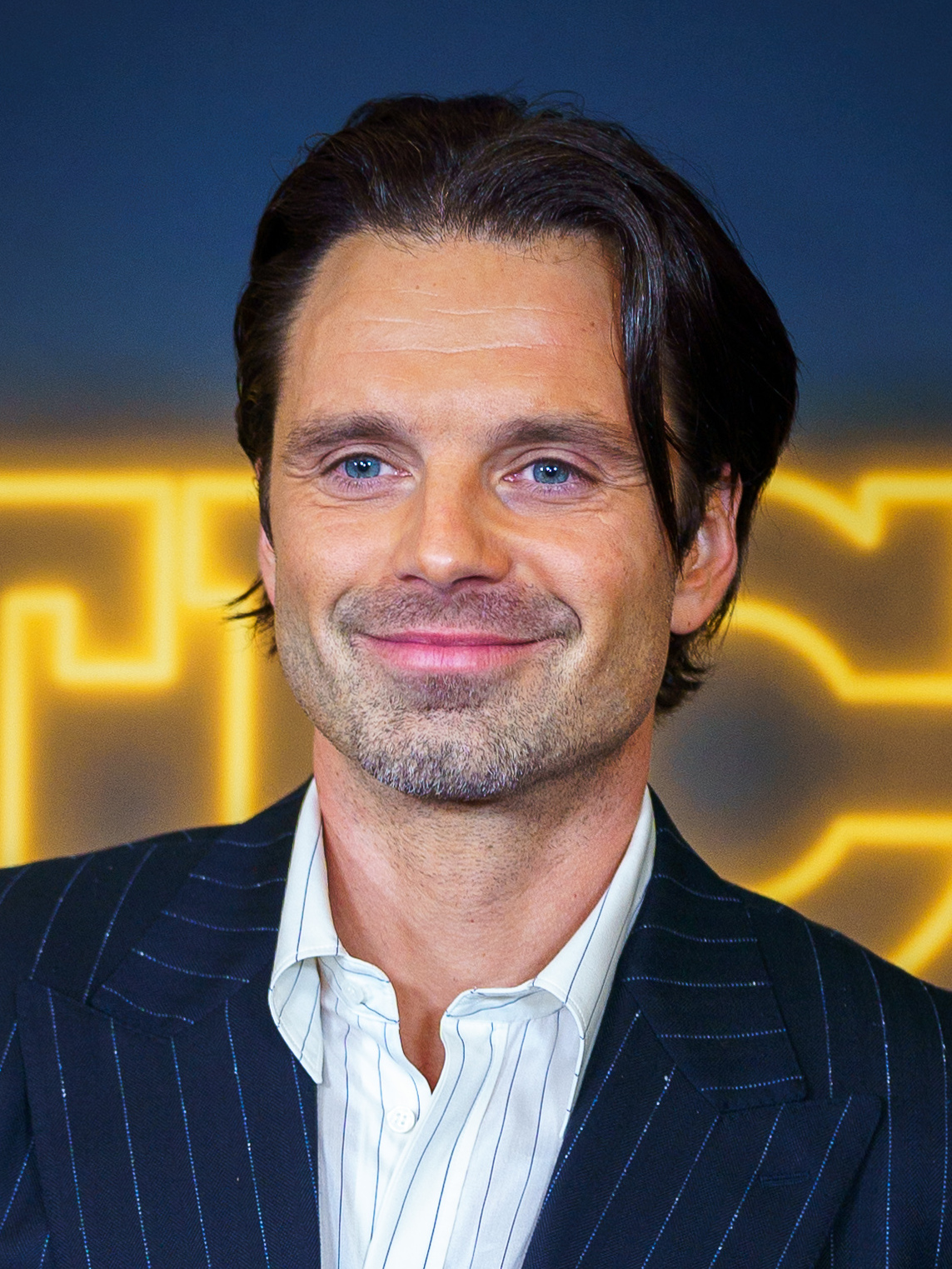
Sebastian Stan

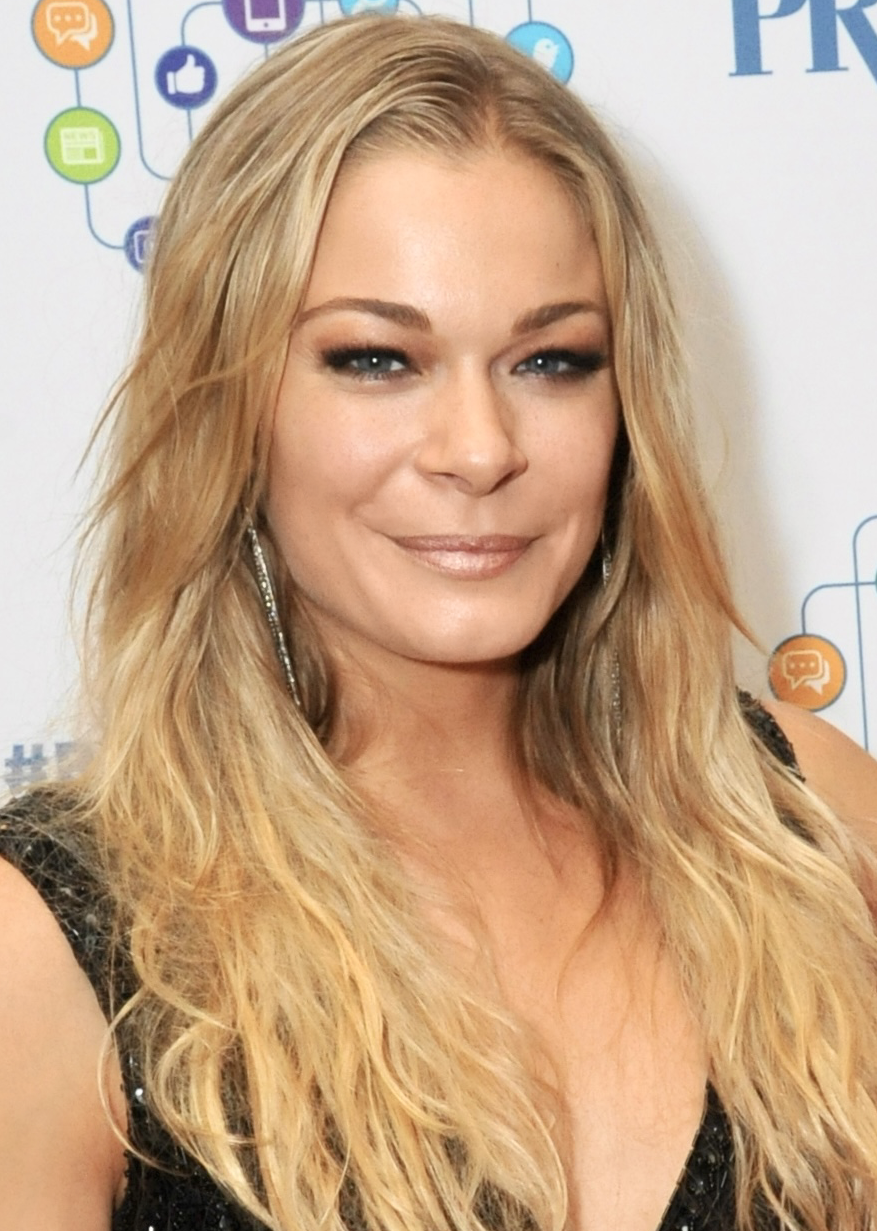
LeAnn Rimes

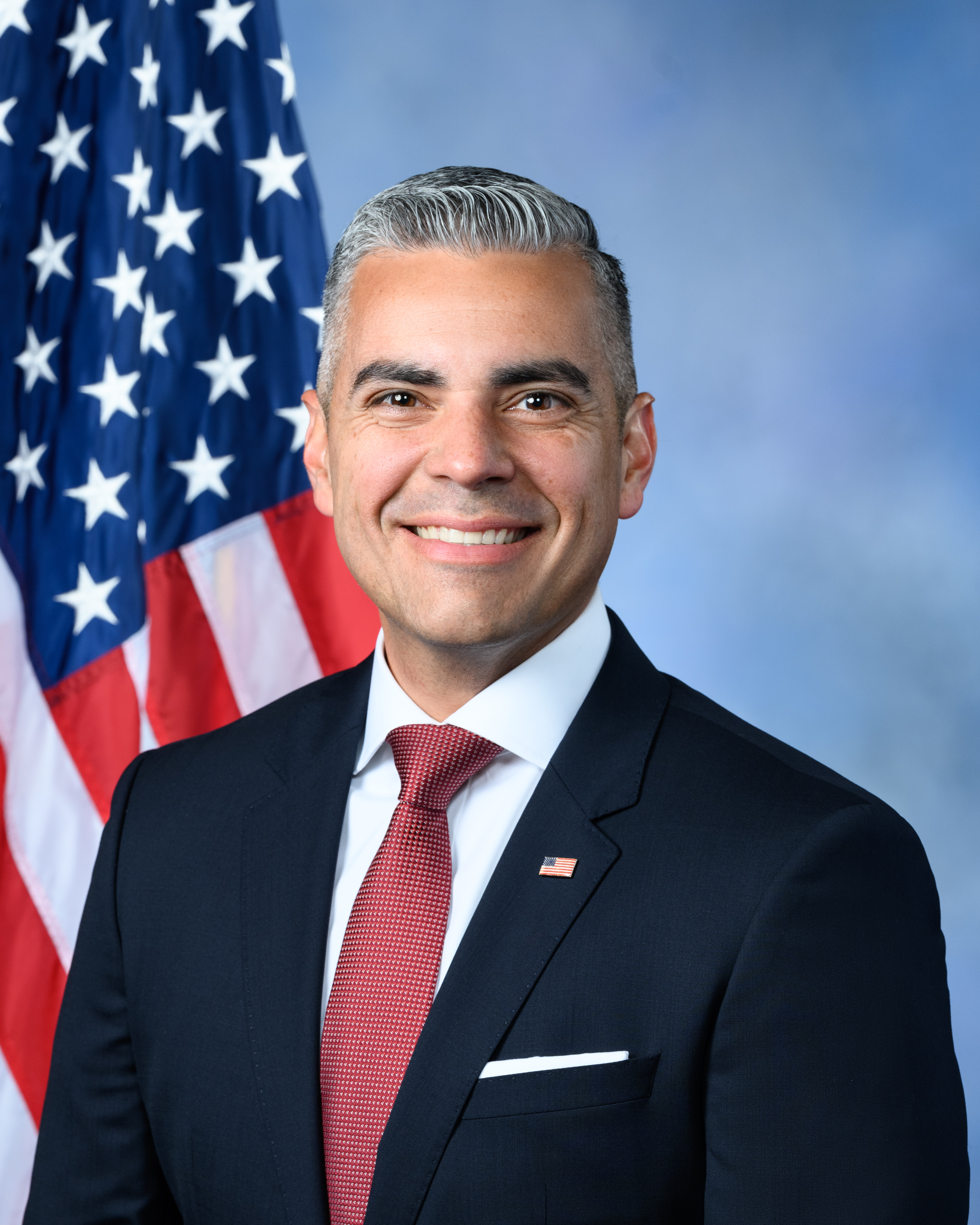
Juan Ciscomani

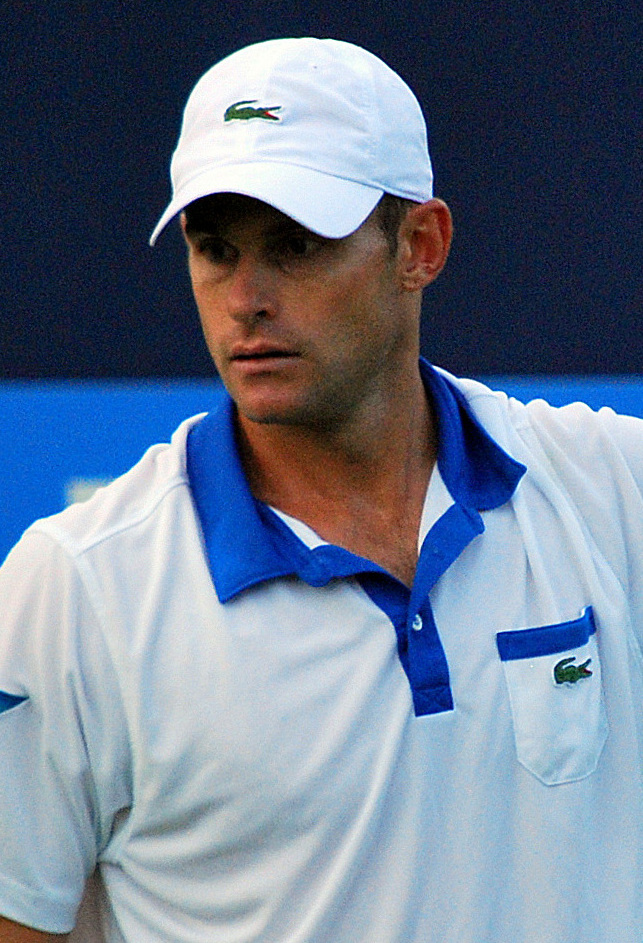
Andy Roddick

- August 2 – Grady Sizemore, baseball player
- August 3
  - Luis Da Silva, actor, basketball player, author, and producer
  - Ryan Mackenzie, politician
- August 5 – Lolo Jones, Olympic hurdler
- August 7
  - Lauren Adams, actress and improviser
  - Brit Marling, actress
- August 9
  - Atia Abawi, German-born author and television journalist
  - Tyson Gay, Olympic sprinter
  - Jes Macallan, actress
  - Kate Siegel, actress and writer
- August 10
  - Josh Anderson, baseball player
  - Devon Aoki, supermodel and actress
- August 12
  - Erin Bethea, actress
  - Rob Sand, politician
- August 13
  - Shani Davis, Olympic speed skater
  - Sarah Huckabee Sanders, White House Press Secretary and 47th Governor of Arkansas
  - Ibram X. Kendi, progressive academic and activist
  - Sebastian Stan, Romanian-born actor
- August 16
  - Nick Ayers, political strategist and consultant
  - Todd Haberkorn, voice actor
  - Matt Lauria, actor and musician
- August 17
  - Ryan Driller, porn actor
  - Mark Salling, actor (d. 2018)
- August 18
  - Cullen Finnerty, football player (d. 2013)
- August 19
  - Erika Christensen, actress and singer
  - Melissa Fumero, actress
  - Stipe Miocic, mixed martial artist
- August 20 – Jamil Walker Smith, actor, director, producer, and writer
- August 23
  - Natalie Coughlin, Olympic swimmer
  - Tony Trujillo, skateboarder
- August 24 – Jennifer Widerstrom, personal trainer
- August 26
  - Esteban Arias, soccer player
  - John Mulaney, actor and comedian
- August 27 – Josh Duhon, actor
- August 28
  - LeAnn Rimes, country singer
  - Kelly Thiebaud, actress
- August 29
  - Echo Kellum, actor and comedian
  - Leon Washington, football player
- August 30
  - Juan Ciscomani, Mexican-born politician
  - Andy Roddick, tennis player
- August 31
  - Ian Crocker, Olympic swimmer
  - Leland Vittert, journalist

=== September ===
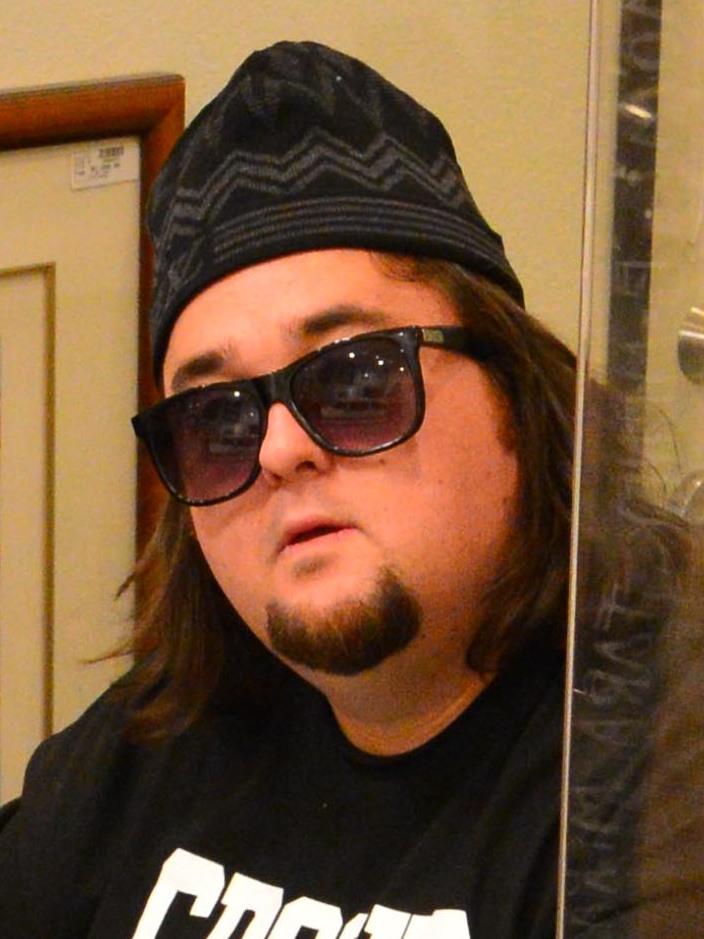
Chumlee

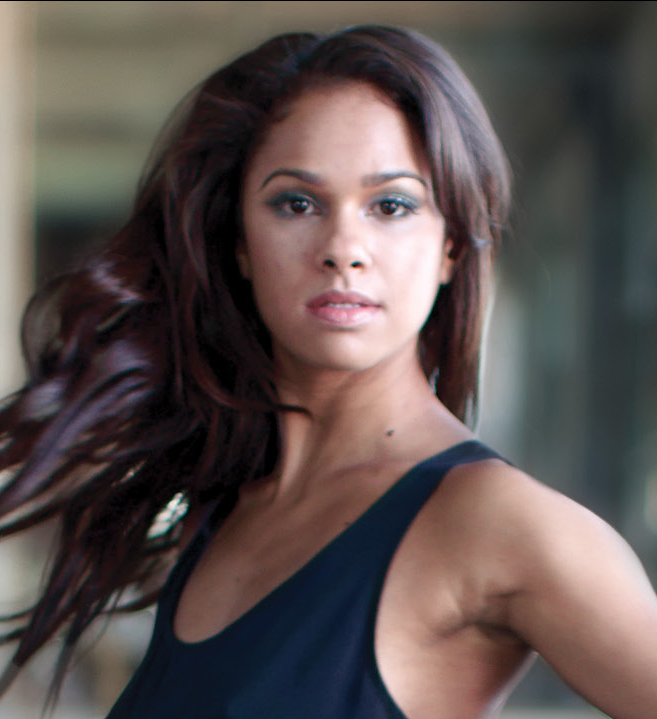
Misty Copeland

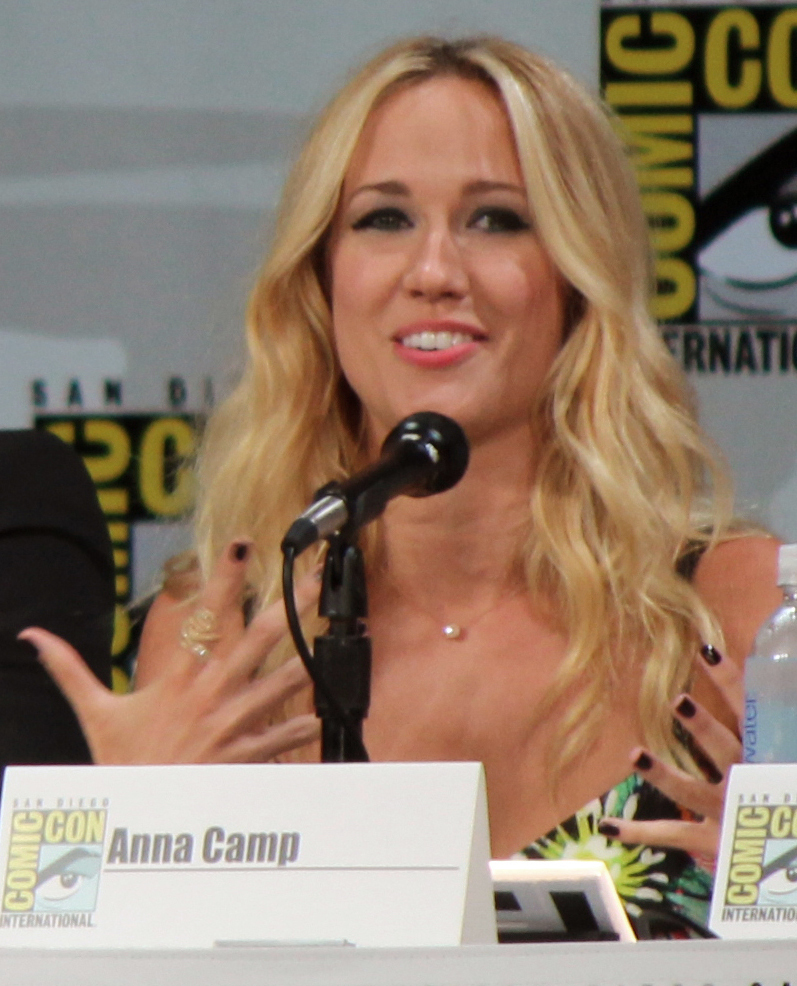
Anna Camp

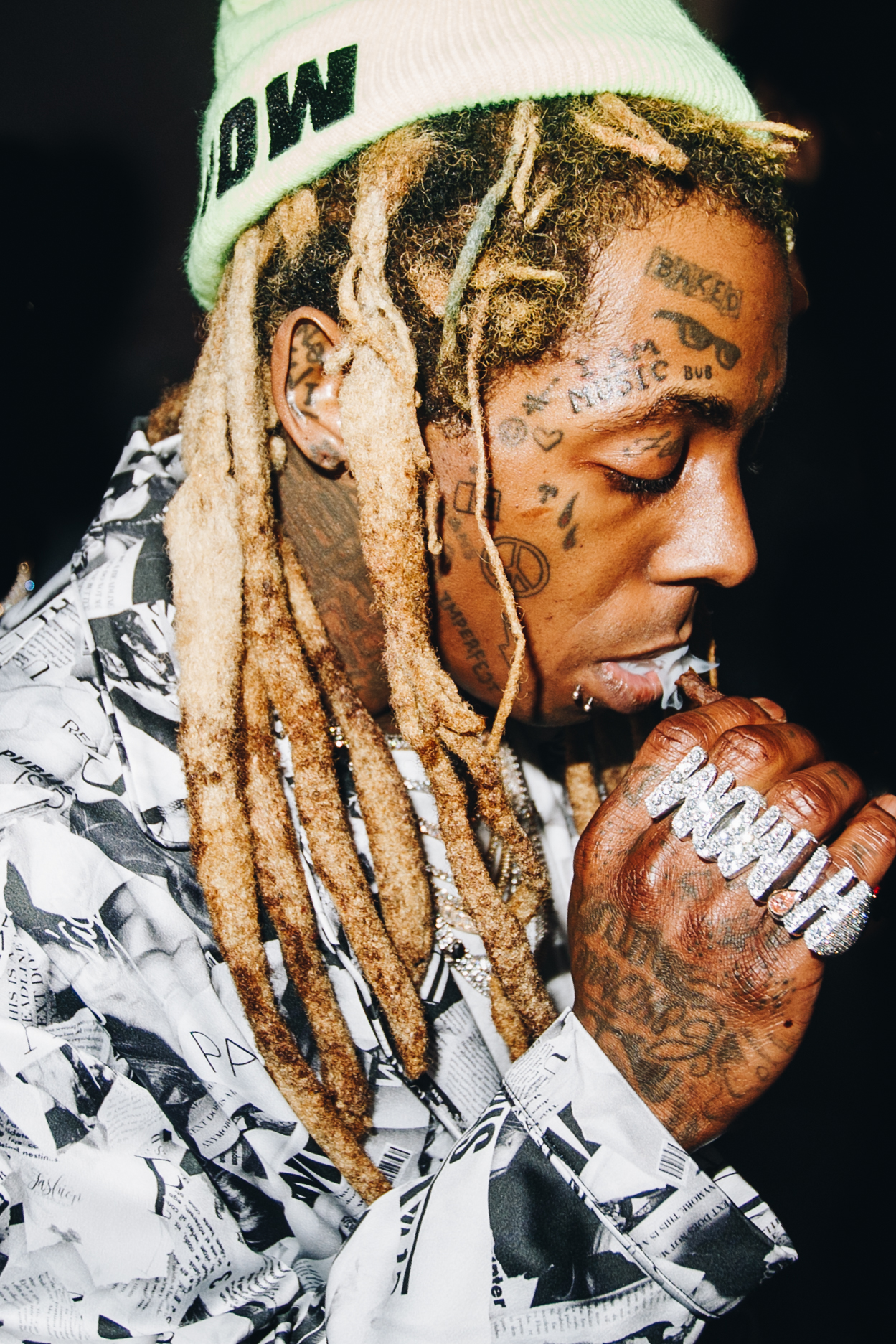
Lil Wayne

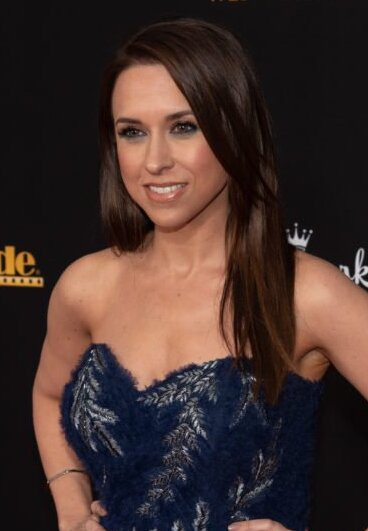
Lacey Chabert

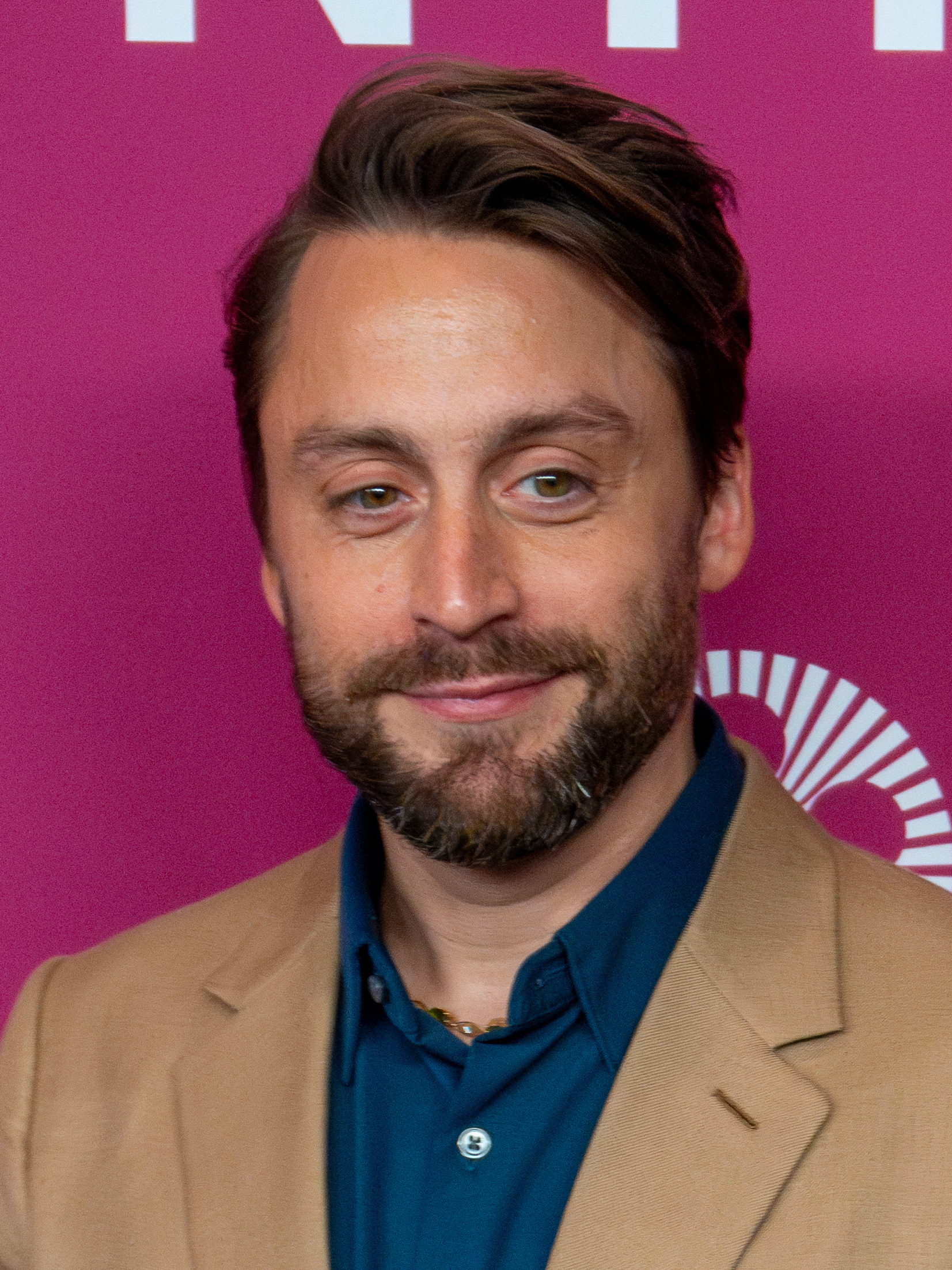
Kieran Culkin

- September 1
  - Matt Arroyo, mixed martial artist
- September 3 – Andrew McMahon, singer/songwriter, pianist, and frontman for Something Corporate and Jack's Mannequin
- September 5
  - Urbano Antillón, boxer
  - Hallie Haglund, comedian, writer, and producer
  - Rose Mazzola, guitarist and bassist
- September 8 – Chumlee, businessman and reality television personality
- September 9 – Aftab Pureval, politician, mayor of Cincinnati, Ohio
- September 10
  - Niklas Arrhenius, American-born Swedish Olympic shot putter and discus thrower
  - Misty Copeland, ballerina
  - Bret Iwan, voice actor
  - Johnny Olszewski, politician
- September 12 – Jeff Jackson, politician
- September 15 – Jesse Andrews, novelist and screenwriter
- September 16 – Koby Altman, basketball coach and president of basketball operations of the Cleveland Cavaliers
- September 17 – Jillian Mele, news anchor and reporter
- September 21 – Rudy Youngblood, actor
- September 25
  - Charlene Amoia, actress
  - Garlin Gilchrist, politician, 64th Lieutenant Governor of Michigan
- September 26
  - AR-Ab, rapper
  - Damian Priest, wrestler
- September 27
  - Anna Camp, actress
  - Lil Wayne, rapper
  - Darrent Williams, football player (d. 2007)
- September 28
  - Emeka Okafor, basketball player
  - Anderson Varejão, basketball player
  - St. Vincent, singer/songwriter and multi-instrumentalist
- September 29 – Stephen "tWitch" Boss, dancer (d. 2022)
- September 30
  - Lacey Chabert, actress and singer
  - Kieran Culkin, actor
  - Ryan Stout, actor

=== October ===
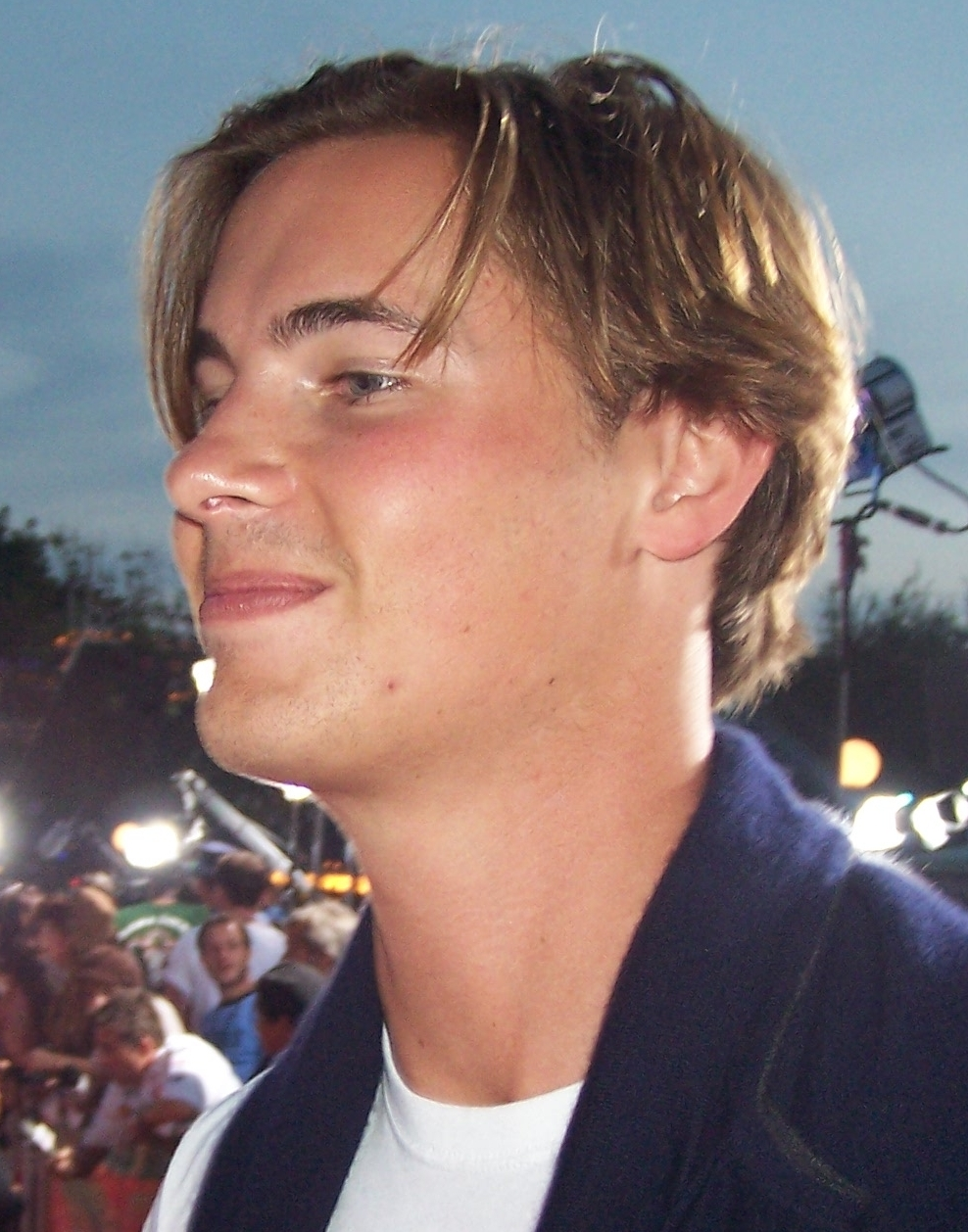
Erik von Detten

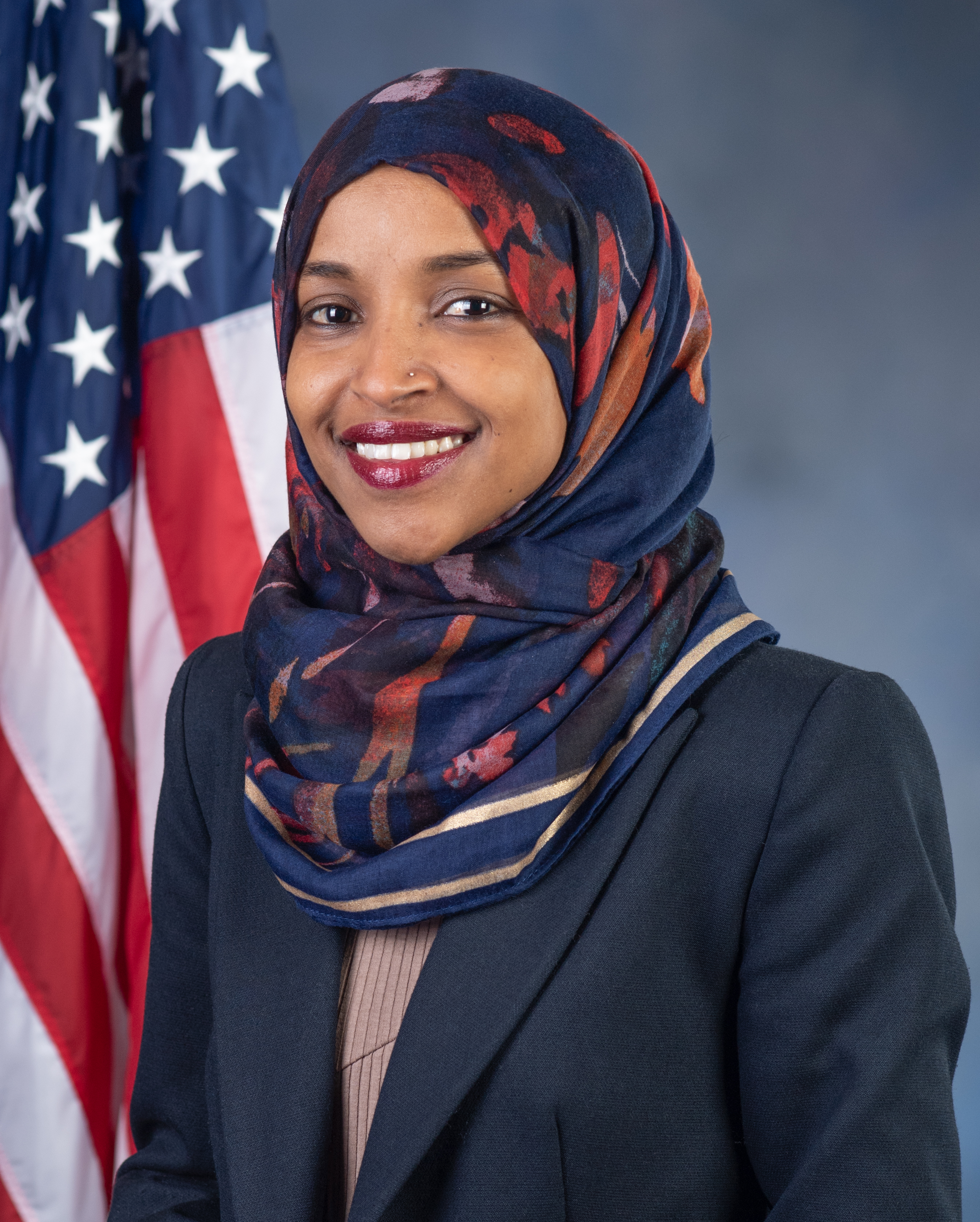
Ilhan Omar

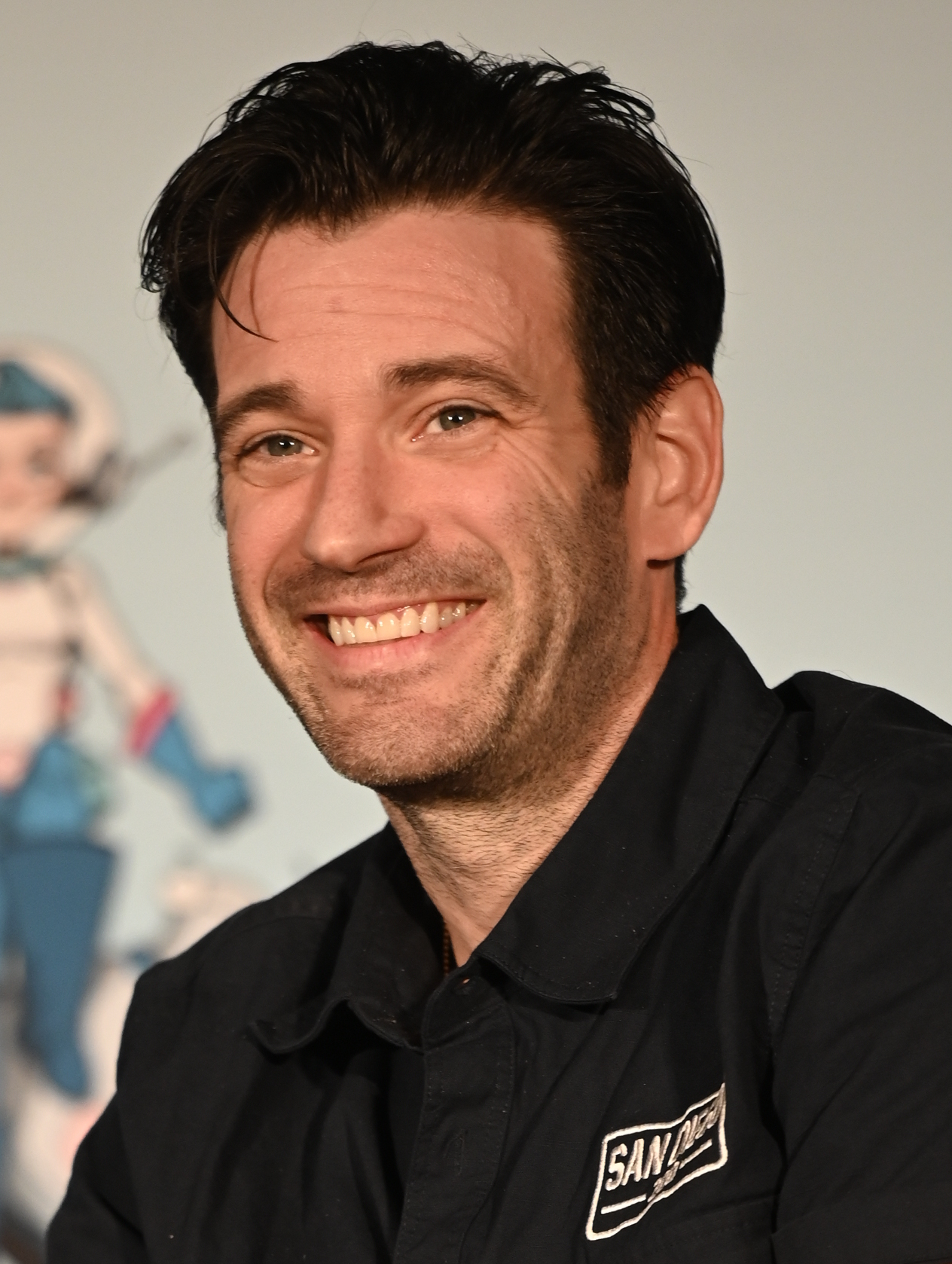
Colin Donnell

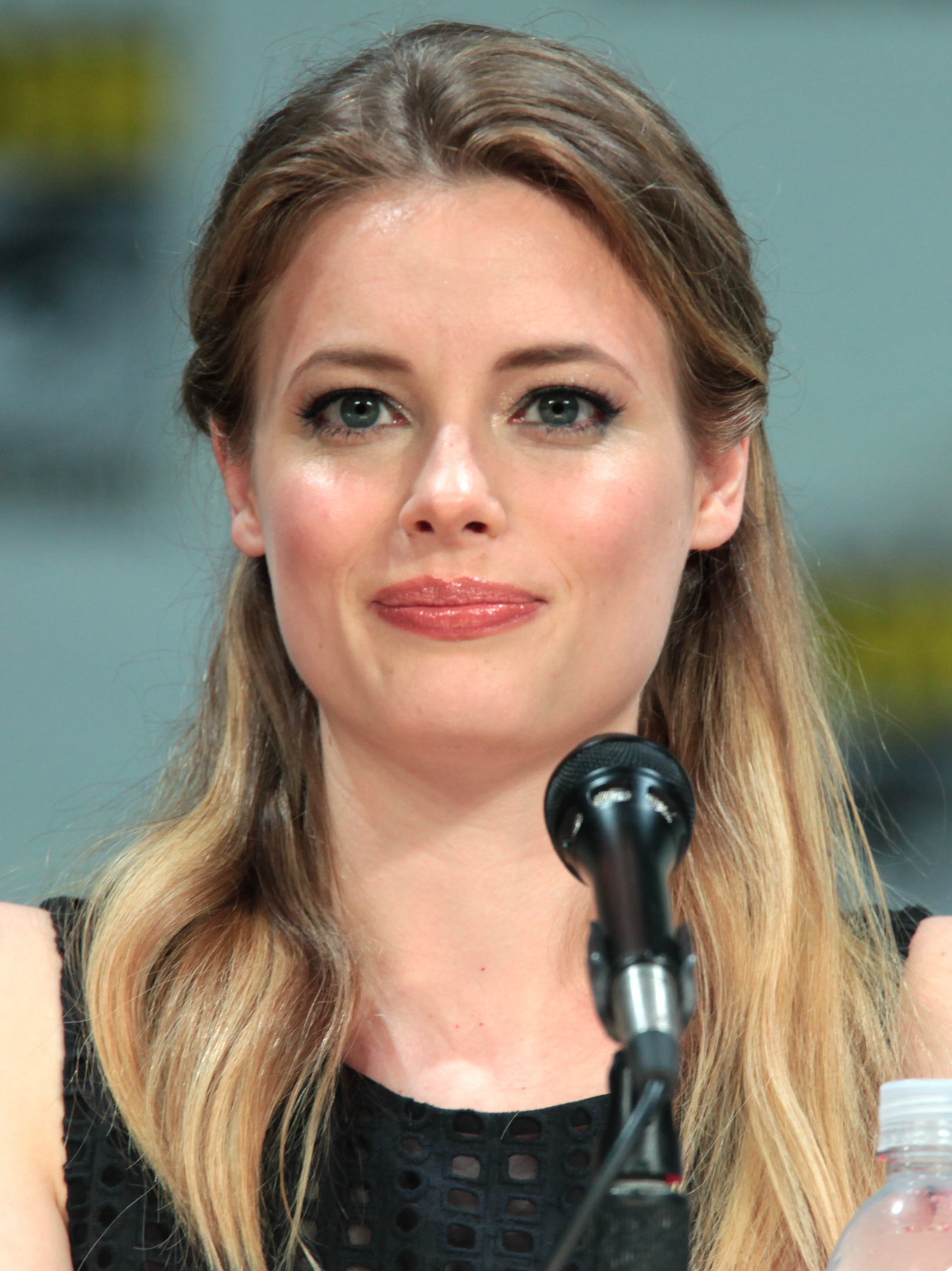
Gillian Jacobs

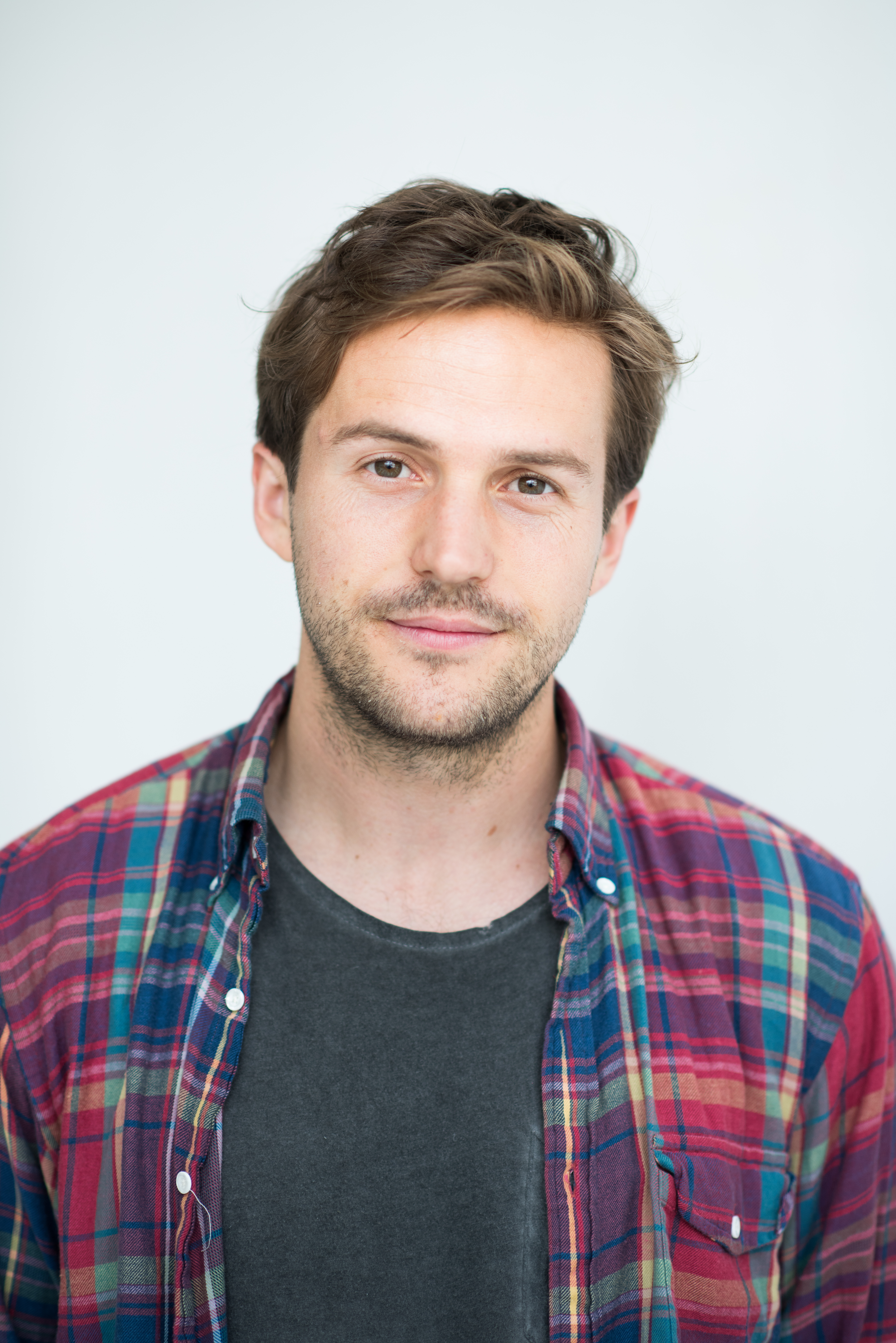
Michael Stahl-David

- October 2 – Tyson Chandler, basketball player
- October 3
  - Applejaxx, Christian rapper
  - Erik von Detten, actor and commodity broker
- October 4
  - Ilhan Omar, Somali-born politician
  - Jered Weaver, baseball player
- October 6
  - Michael Arden, actor, musician, and stage director
  - Lucas Kunce, politician
  - MC Lars, rapper
  - Lil Wyte, rapper
- October 7
  - Jessica Allister, softball player and coach
  - Robby Ginepri, tennis player
  - Alok Kanojia, psychiatrist
- October 9
  - Colin Donnell, actor
  - Travis Rice, snowboarder
  - Kevin Sanders, drummer for Cartel
- October 11
  - Trevor Donovan, actor and model
  - Salim Stoudamire, basketball player
- October 12
  - Bashir Ahmad, Pakistani-born mixed martial artist
  - Julie Kagawa, author
- October 15 – Brandon Jay McLaren, Canadian-born actor
- October 16 – Alan Anderson, basketball player
  - Trevor Donovan, actor and model
- October 17 – Abe Alvarez, baseball player and coach
- October 18
  - Simon Gotch, wrestler
  - Shauntay Henderson, criminal and convicted killer
- October 19
  - Brandon Curry, bodybuilder
  - Gillian Jacobs, actress
- October 20 – Katie Featherston, actress
- October 21 – Matt Dallas, actor
- October 22
  - Heath Miller, football player
  - Caleb Rowden, politician
  - James Walkinshaw, politician
- October 24 – Guillermo Alvarez, gymnast
- October 27 – Dennis Moran, criminal and computer hacker (d. 2013)
- October 28
  - Michael Stahl-David, actor
  - Anthony Lerew, baseball player
- October 30 – Craig Albernaz, baseball coach
- October 31 – Matt Anderson, ice hockey player

=== November ===
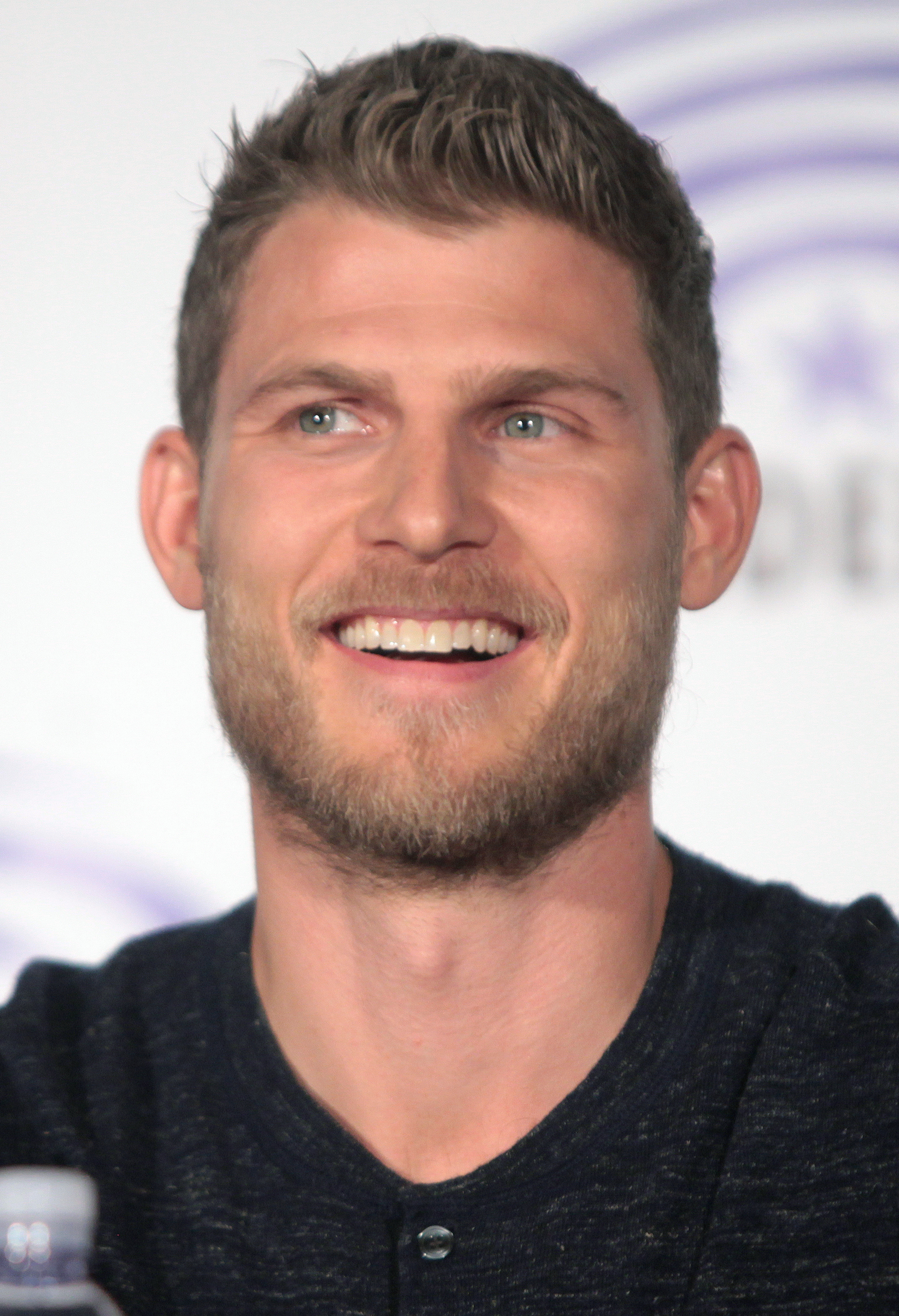
Travis Van Winkle

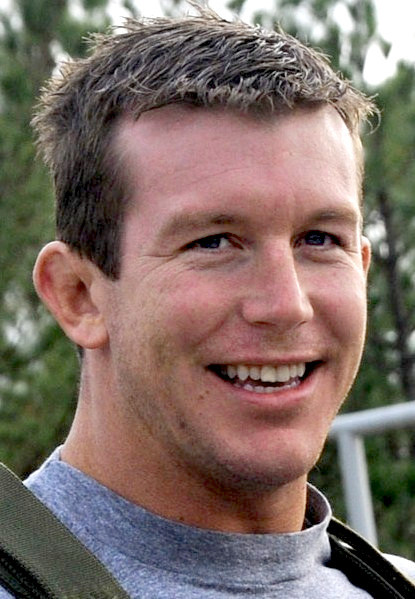
Ted DiBiase

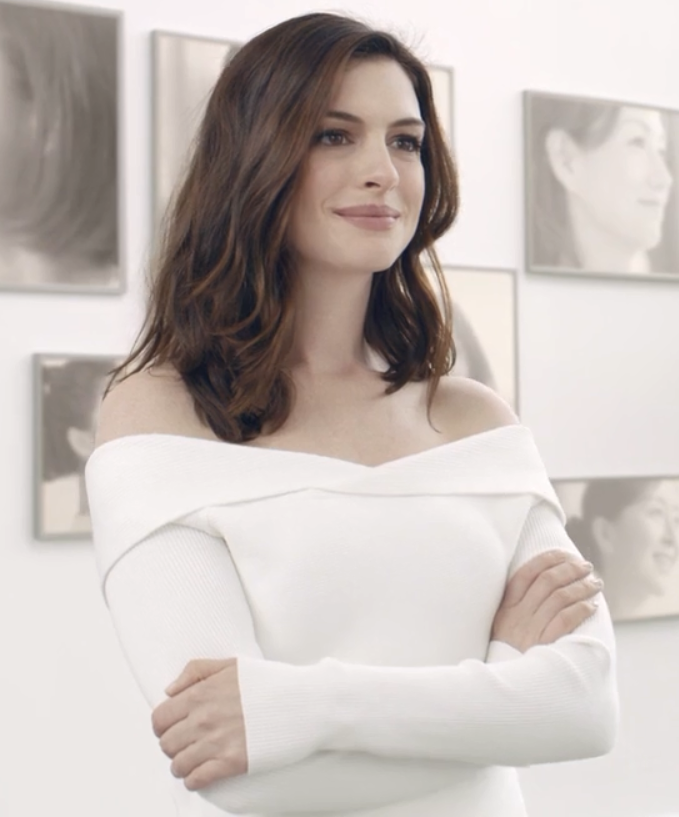
Anne Hathaway

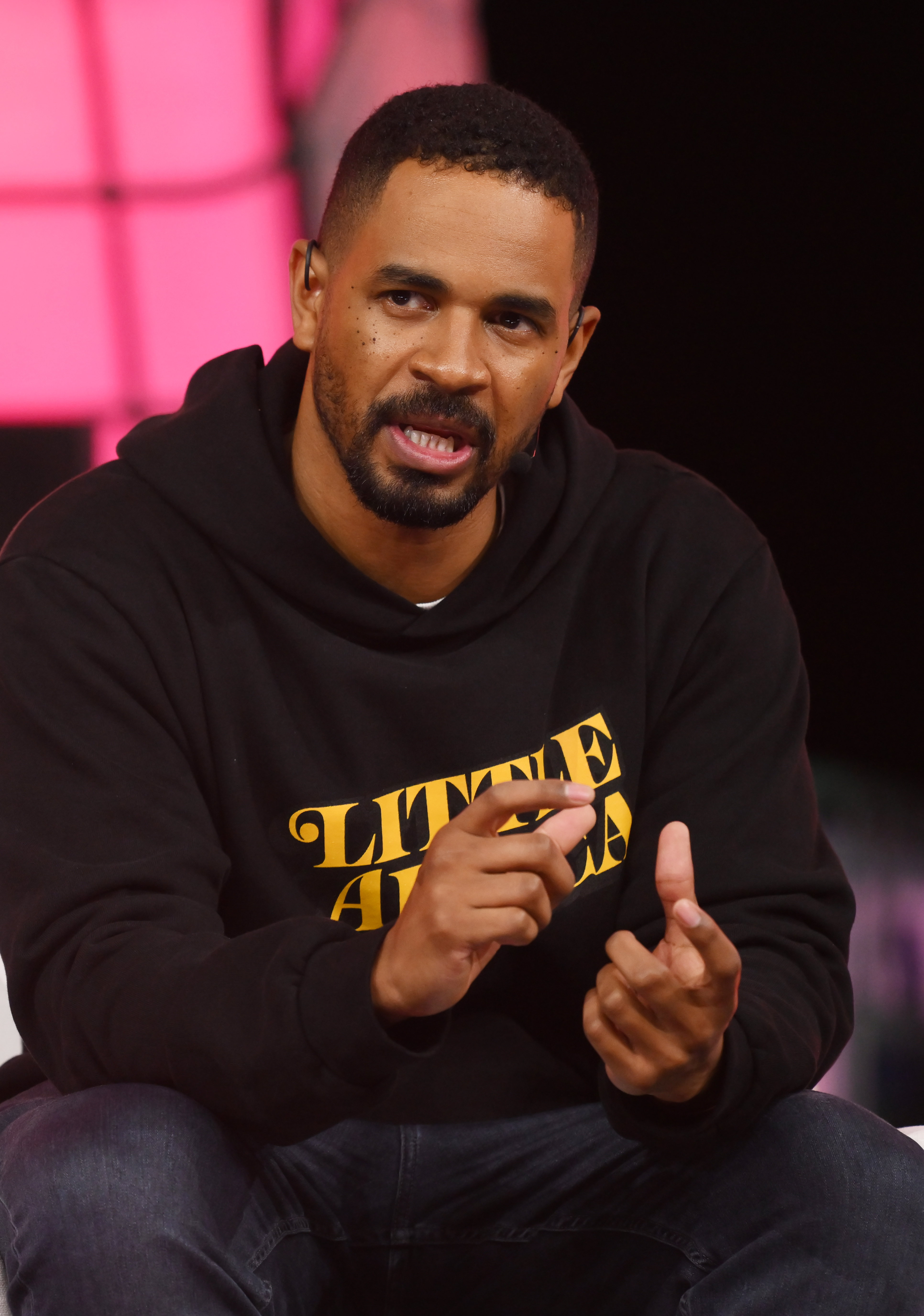
Damon Wayans Jr.

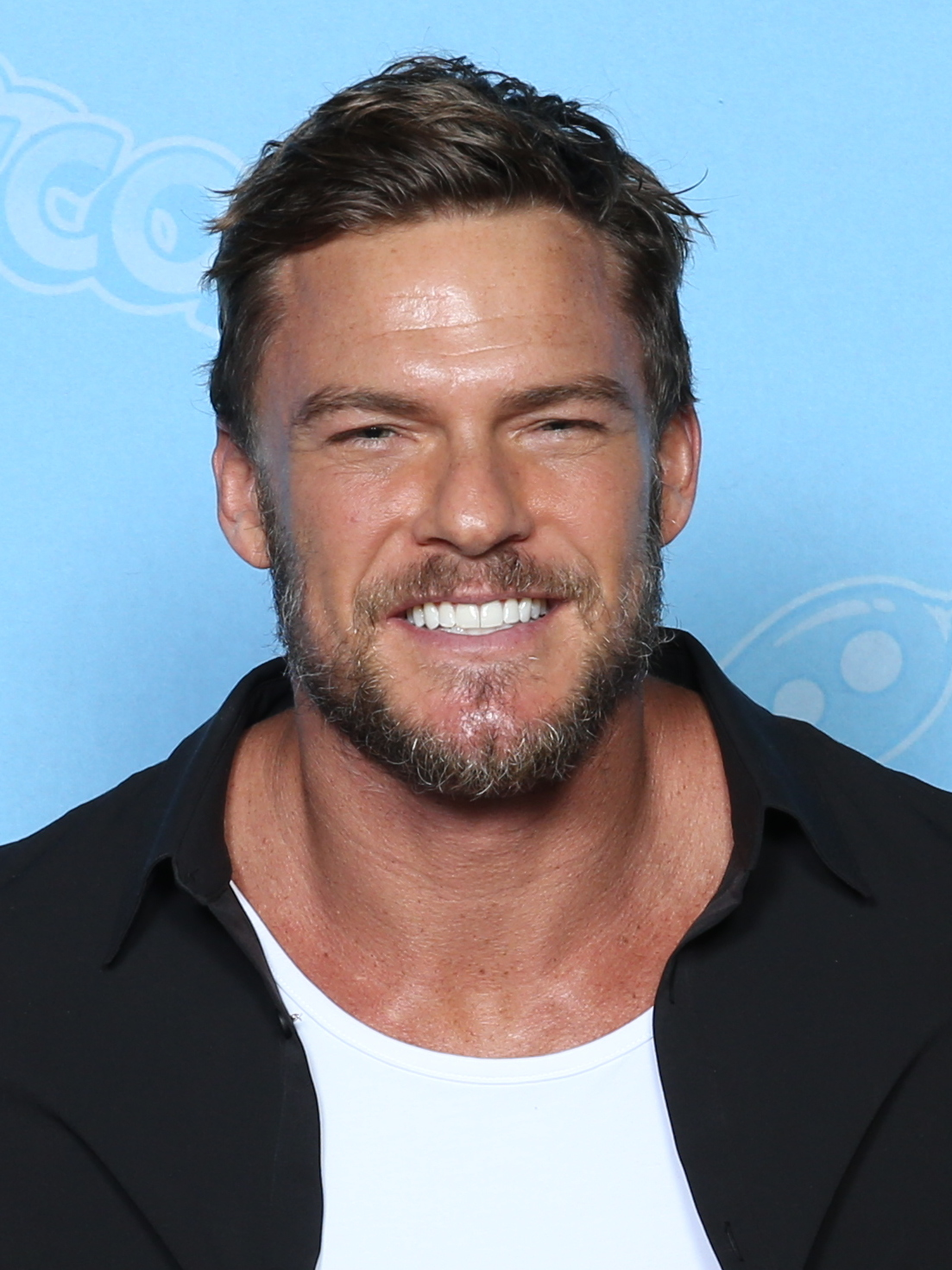
Alan Ritchson

- November 1 – John Allen, basketball player
- November 2 – Adam Springfield, actor
- November 3
  - M. K. Asante, author, filmmaker, recording artist, and professor
  - Janel McCarville, basketball player and coach
- November 4 – Travis Van Winkle, actor
- November 5
  - Alaché, Nigerian-born Christian R&B singer/songwriter
  - Tui Alailefaleula, football player
  - David Archer, football player and coach
- November 7 – Marc Orrell, guitarist
- November 8
  - Ted DiBiase, wrestler and actor
  - Lynndie England, war criminal
  - Devin Hester, football player
- November 10 – Heather Matarazzo, actress
- November 11 – Brittny Gastineau, model and socialite
- November 12 – Anne Hathaway, actress
- November 14
  - Boosie Badazz, rapper
  - Laura Ramsey, actress
- November 15
  - Elliot Anderson, politician
  - Yaya DaCosta, actress
  - D. J. Fitzpatrick, football player
  - Joe Kowalewski, football player
  - Lofa Tatupu, football player
- November 16 – Amar'e Stoudemire, basketball player
- November 17 – Becky Albertalli, author
- November 18
  - Matt Mahan, politician, mayor of San Jose, California (2023–present)
  - Damon Wayans Jr., actor and comedian
- November 19 – Shin Dong-hyuk, North Korean-born defector and human rights activist
- November 20
  - Bobby Creekwater, rapper
  - Margo Stilley, actress and writer
- November 21
  - Lissie, singer-songwriter
  - Ryan Starr, singer
- November 23 – Tom Denney, guitarist for A Day to Remember (2003–2009)
- November 24 – Ryan Fitzpatrick, football player
- November 28
  - Adam McArthur, actor and martial artist
  - Malcolm Goodwin, actor
  - Alan Ritchson, actor, model and singer
- November 29
  - Lucas Black, actor
  - Ashley Force Hood, race car driver
  - Eddie Spears, actor
- November 30
  - Nick Hipa, guitarist for As I Lay Dying (2003–2020) and Wovenwar
  - Jason Pominville, hockey player

=== December ===
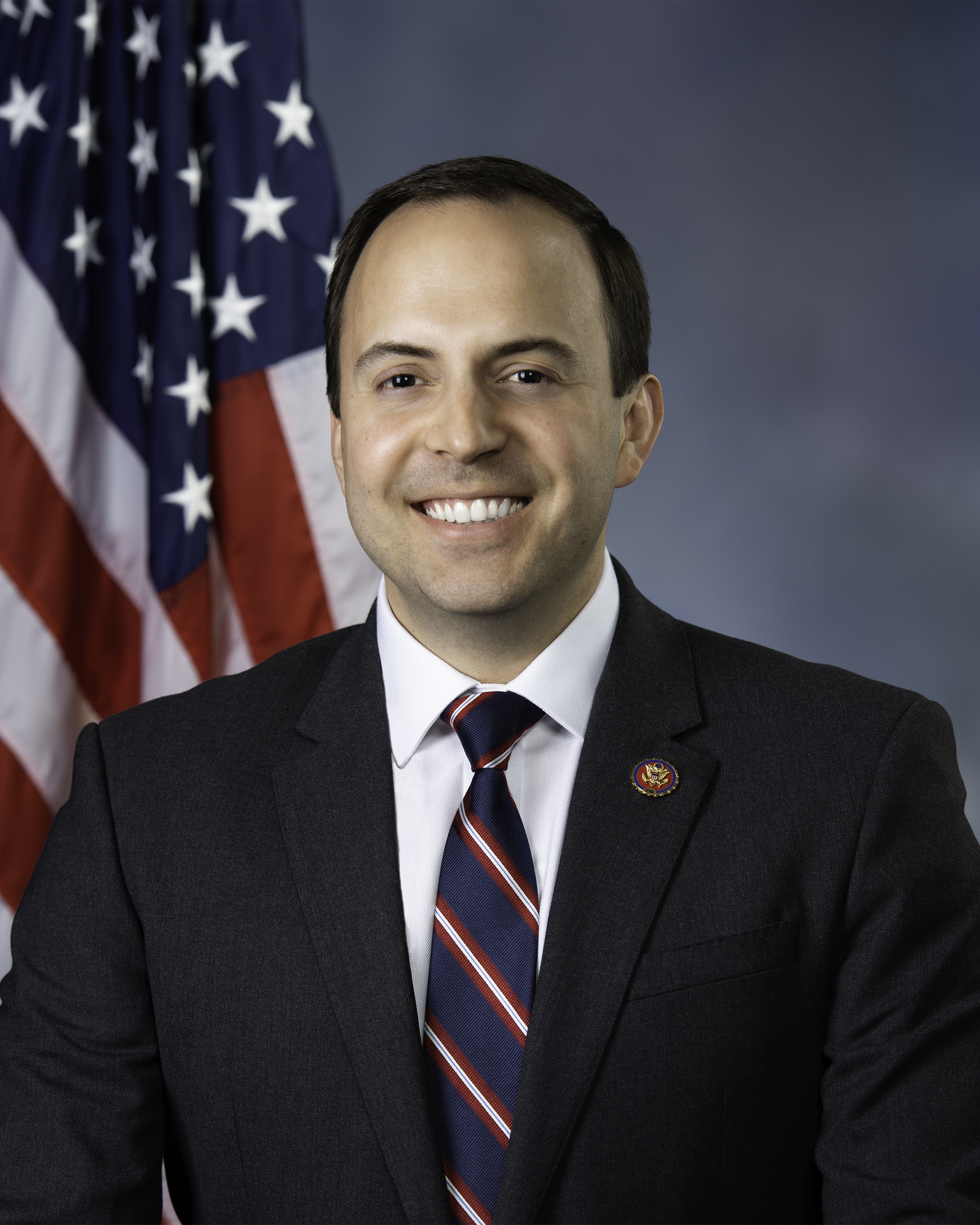
Lance Gooden

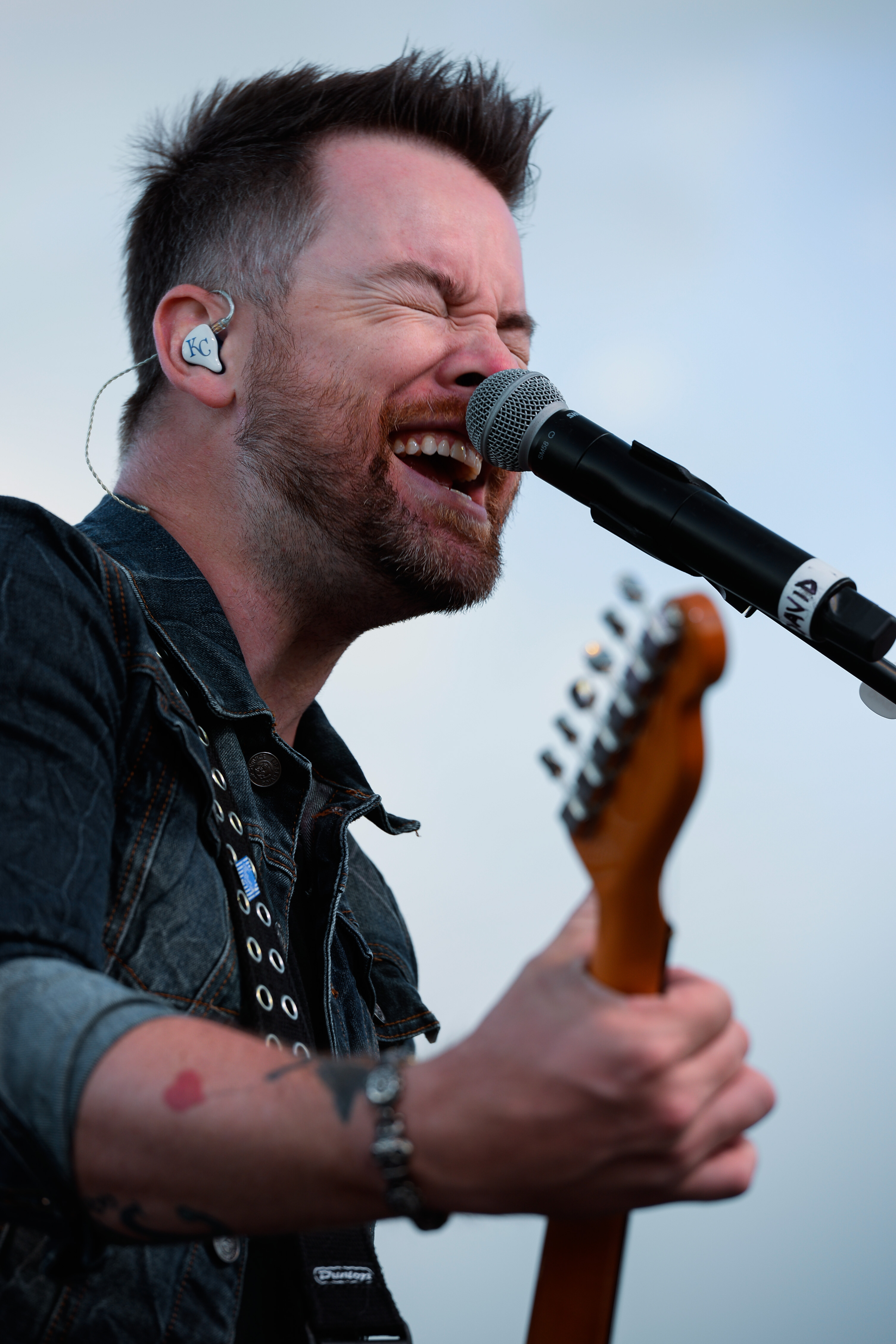
David Cook

- December 1 – Lance Gooden, politician
- December 2 – Streeter Seidell, comedian, writer, actor, and television host
- December 3
  - Dascha Polanco, Dominican-born actress
  - Lucy Walsh, actress, singer/songwriter, and pianist
- December 5
  - Eddy Curry, basketball player
  - Trai Essex, American football player
  - Keri Hilson, R&B recording artist, songwriter, and actress
  - Gabriel Luna, actor
- December 7 – Lou Amundson, basketball player
- December 8
  - Raquel Atawo, tennis player
  - Nicki Minaj, rapper
- December 11 – Roman Harper, football player
- December 14 – Jesse Garcia, actor
- December 16 – Amanda Stuck, politician
- December 17 – Mike Martin, former vlogger
- December 20
  - David Cook, singer/songwriter and guitarist
  - David Wright, baseball player
- December 21
  - Rob Abiamiri, football player
  - Mike Gansey, basketball player
- December 22
  - Rodney Martin, sprinter
  - Neal Tiemann, guitarist for DevilDriver (2015–2021) and Midwest Kings
- December 24 – Scott Colom, politician
- December 25
  - Shawn Andrews, football player
  - James Apollo, singer, bandleader, and producer
- December 26 – Tiffany Derry, chef, restauranteur, and television personality
- December 28
  - Cedric Benson, football player (d. 2019)
  - Beau Garrett, actress and model
- December 29 – Alison Brie, actress
- December 30 – Dathan Ritzenhein, long-distance runner

=== Full date unknown ===
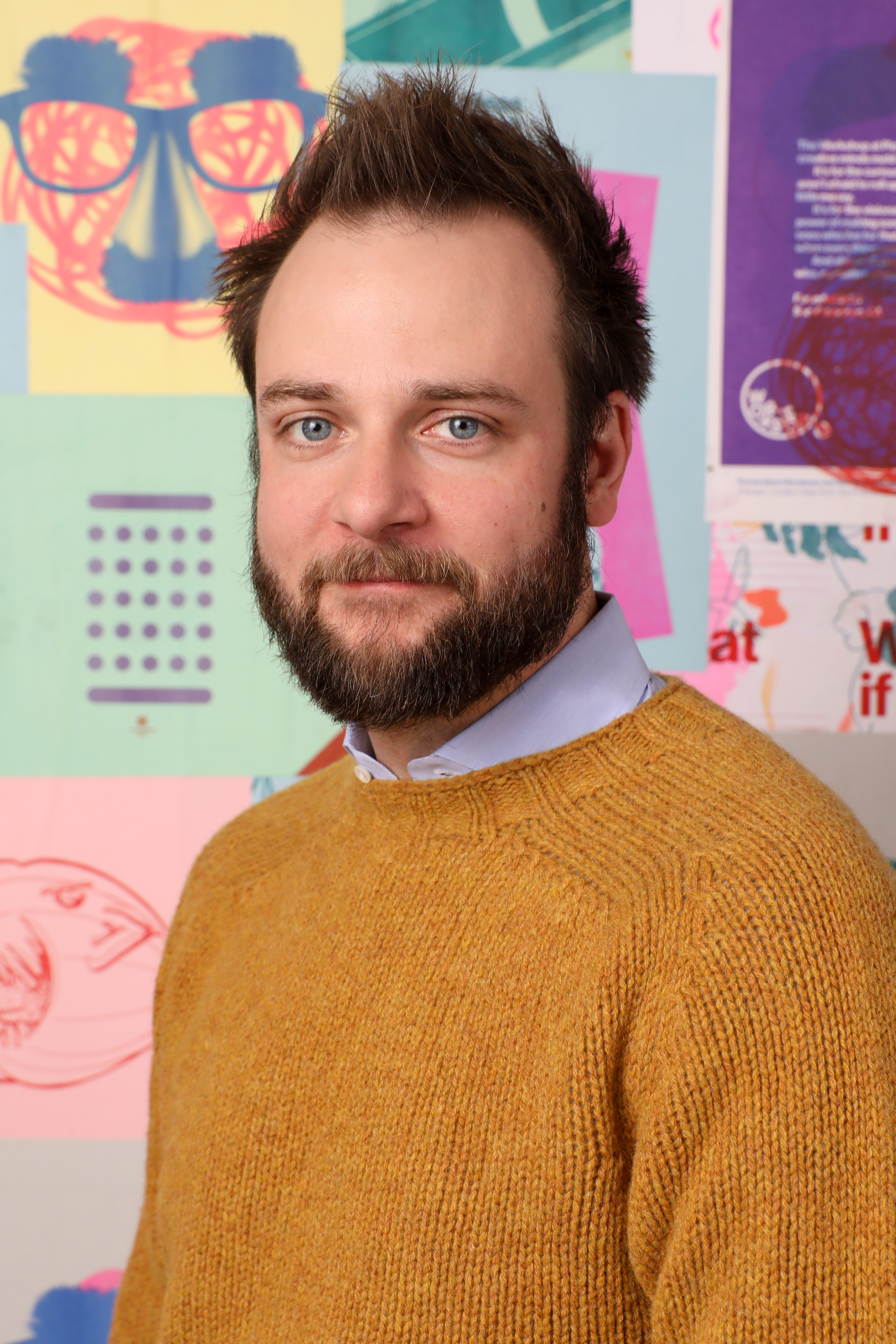
Evan Sharp

- Zarouhie Abdalian, artist
- Nina Chanel Abney, artist
- Curtis Adams, magician
- Daniel Alaei, poker player
- Maytha Alhassen, journalist
- Alsarah, Sudanese-born singer/songwriter and ethnomusicologist
- Roy Altman, judge
- Lisa Alvarado, visual artist and harmonium player
- Sana Amanat, American-born Pakistani comic book editor
- Ruby Onyinyechi Amanze, Nigeria-born British-American artist
- Triston Jay Amero, terrorist (d. 2008)
- Polina Anikeeva, Russian-born materials scientist
- Daniel Arango, Colombian-born artist
- Maria Aspan, journalist
- Roy Assaf, Israeli-born jazz pianist and composer
- Colin C, musician, remixer, audio engineer, and record producer
- Tyler Duckworth, television personality (d. 2026)
- Lior Geller, filmmaker
- Themo H. Peel, author and illustrator
- Evan Sharp, entrepreneur and co-founder of Pinterest

== Deaths ==
- January 1 – Victor Buono, actor, comedian, and recording artist (b. 1938)
- January 3 – Erwin Canham, journalist (b. 1904)
- January 5
  - Hans Conried, actor and comedian (b. 1917)
  - Harvey Lembeck, actor (b. 1923)
- January 8 – Reta Shaw, actress (b. 1912)
- January 10 – Paul Lynde, comedian and actor (b. 1926)
- January 30 – Lightnin' Hopkins, blues musician (b. 1912)
- February 11 – Eleanor Powell, actress and dancer (b. 1912)
- February 17
  - Thelonious Monk, pianist and composer (b. 1917)
  - Lee Strasberg, theatre director, actor, and acting coach (b. 1901)
- February 21 – Murray the K, rock and roll impresario and disc jockey (b. 1922)
- March 5 – John Belushi, comedian and actor (b. 1949)
- March 19 – Randy Rhoads, guitarist (b. 1956)
- March 24 – Ken Harris, animator (b. 1898)
- March 29
  - Ray Bloch, composer, songwriter, conductor, pianist, author, author, and arranger (b. 1902)
  - Rudy Bond, actor (b. 1912)
- April 3 – Warren Oates, actor (b. 1928)
- April 5 – Abe Fortas, jurist, and lawyer; served as associate judge of the U.S. Supreme Court from 1965 to 1969 (b. 1910)
- April 7 – Brenda Benet, actress (b. 1945)
- April 25 – Don Wilson, announcer and actor (b. 1900)
- May 1 – William Primrose, Scottish-born violist (b. 1904)
- May 2 – Hugh Marlowe, actor (b. 1911)
- May 5 – Cal Tjader, Latin jazz musician (b. 1925)
- May 14 – Hugh Beaumont, actor (b. 1910)
- June 3 – Rusty Day, rock singer (b. 1945)
- June 6 – Kenneth Rexroth, poet (b. 1905)
- June 8 – Satchel Paige, baseball player (b. 1906)
- June 12 – Al Rinker, singer-songwriter (b. 1907)
- June 13 – Peter Maivia, Samoan-American wrestler (b. 1937)
- June 15 – Art Pepper, jazz musician and saxophonist (b. 1925)
- June 18 – John Cheever, novelist and short story writer (b. 1912)
- July 2 – DeFord Bailey, country musician (b. 1899)
- July 6 – Bob Johnson, baseball outfielder and manager (b. 1905)
- July 7 – Irene Craigmile Bolam, Amelia Earhart look-alike/believed alias (b. 1904)
- July 14 – Jackie Jensen, baseball player (b. 1927)
- July 18 – John Maxwell, actor (b. 1918)
- July 19 – Hugh Everett III, physicist (b. 1930)
- July 21 – Dave Garroway, television host (b. 1913)
- July 22 – Lloyd Waner, baseball player (Pittsburgh Pirates) and a member of the MLB Hall of Fame (b. 1906)
- July 23 – Vic Morrow, actor (b. 1929)
- July 29 – Harold Sakata, Olympian, wrestler, and actor (b. 1920)
- August 1 – Agnes Gehrman, politician (b. 1893)
- August 7 – Jill Banner, actress (b. 1946)
- August 12 – Henry Fonda, actor (b. 1905)
- August 13
  - Joe E. Ross, actor (b. 1914)
  - Joe Tex, singer and musician (b. 1935)
- August 17 – Barney Phillips, actor (b. 1913)
- August 23 – Alfred S. Bloomingdale, businessman (b. 1916)
- September 1 – Charles Hartmann, jazz trombonist (b. 1898)
- September 2 – Jay Novello, actor (b. 1904)
- September 7 – Ken Boyer, baseball player (b. 1931)
- September 14 – Grace Kelly, actress, Princess of Monaco (b. 1929)
- September 18 – David Louis Lidman, writer (b. 1905)
- September 28 – Mabel Albertson, actress (b. 1901)
- September 29 – Monty Stratton, baseball player (b. 1912)
- September 30 – Bill George, American football player (Chicago Bears); member of the Pro Football Hall of Fame (b. 1929)
- October 8 – Fernando Lamas, Argentine-American actor and director (b. 1915)
- October 11 – Edith Quimby, medical researcher and physicist (b. 1891)
- October 18 – Bess Truman, First Lady of the United States, Second Lady of the United States (b. 1885)
- October 29 – J. C. Hall, founder of Hallmark Cards (b. 1891)
- November 1
  - James Broderick, actor (b. 1927)
  - King Vidor, film director, producer and screenwriter (b. 1894)
- November 4 – Dominique Dunne, actress (b. 1959)
- November 10 – Helen Sharsmith, biologist and educator (b. 1905)
- November 16 – Al Haig, pianist (b. 1924)
- November 25 – Hugh Harman, cartoon animator (b. 1903)
- December 7 – Will Lee, actor (b. 1908)
- December 8 – Marty Robbins, singer-songwriter, race car driver (b. 1925)
- December 9 – Leon Jaworski, attorney and law professor (b. 1905)
- December 17 – Big Joe Williams, musician and songwriter (b. 1903)
- December 20 – Arthur Rubinstein, Polish-American pianist (b. 1887)
- December 21 – Ants Oras, Estonian-American author and academic (b. 1900)
- December 23 – Jack Webb, actor, television producer, screenwriter (b. 1920)
- December 27 – Jack Swigert, NASA astronaut (b. 1931)
- December 30 – Alberto Vargas, Peruvian-American painter (b. 1896)

== See also ==
- 1982 in American television
- List of American films of 1982
- Timeline of United States history (1970–1989)
