= Primetime Emmy Award for Outstanding Children's Program =

Award for outstanding children's television program

- Awarded for: Outstanding Children's Program
- Country: United States
- Presented by: Academy of Television Arts & Sciences
- First award: 1950 (first awarded to Time for Beany)
- Currently held by: Jim Henson's The Dark Crystal: Age of Resistance and We Are the Dream: The Kids of the Oakland MLK Oratorical Fest (2020)
- Website: emmys.com

The Primetime Emmy Award for Outstanding Children's Program was presented to television programming aimed towards children in any format. Series, specials and non-fiction programming were all eligible for the award. Prior to 1974, both daytime and primetime programming was eligible. However, once the Daytime Emmy Awards were formed, only primetime television remained eligible.

The Academy of Television Arts & Sciences (ATAS) revised their rules for the 72nd Primetime Emmy Awards to exclude primetime specials or extensions of a daytime series from eligibility for the award. The rule change followed three consecutive wins for Sesame Street primetime specials. The category was retired beginning with the 73rd Primetime Emmy Awards, citing that streaming services had created further confusion over whether children's programs would be eligible for the award or not. The NATAS, who organizes the Daytime Emmys, announced in 2021 that it would introduce a Children's and Family Emmy Awards presentation beginning in 2022.

== Winners and nominations ==
indicates the winner

=== 1950s ===
Year	Program	Nominees	Network
1950 (2nd)
1950 (2nd)	Time for Beany	—	KTLA
1950 (2nd)	Cyclone Malone	—	KNBH
1950 (2nd)	Kukla, Fran and Ollie	—	KNBH
1951 (3rd)
1951 (3rd)	Time for Beany	—	KTLA
1951 (3rd)	The Cisco Kid	—	KNBH
1951 (3rd)	Jump Jump	—	KTTV
1951 (3rd)	Kukla, Fran and Ollie	—	NBC
1951 (3rd)	The Lone Ranger	—	KTLA
1953 (5th)
1953 (5th)	Time for Beany	—	KTLA
1953 (5th)	Big Top	—	CBS
1953 (5th)	Gabby Hayes	—	NBC
1953 (5th)	The Howdy Doody Show	—	NBC
1953 (5th)	Kukla, Fran and Ollie	—	NBC
1953 (5th)	Super Circus	—	NBC
1953 (5th)	Zoo Parade	—	NBC
1954 (6th)
1954 (6th)	Kukla, Fran and Ollie	—	NBC
1954 (6th)	Big Top	—	CBS
1954 (6th)	Ding Dong School	—	NBC
1954 (6th)	Super Circus	—	NBC
1954 (6th)	Zoo Parade	—	NBC
1955 (7th)
1955 (7th)	Lassie	—	CBS
1955 (7th)	Art Linkletter and the Kids	—	Syndicated
1955 (7th)	Ding Dong School	—	NBC
1955 (7th)	Kukla, Fran and Ollie	—	ABC
1955 (7th)	Time for Beany	—	Syndicated
1955 (7th)	Zoo Parade	—	NBC
1956 (8th)
1956 (8th)	Lassie	—	CBS
1956 (8th)	Ding Dong School	—	NBC
1956 (8th)	The Howdy Doody Show	—	NBC
1956 (8th)	Kukla, Fran and Ollie	—	ABC
1956 (8th)	The Mickey Mouse Club	—	ABC
1956 (8th)	The Pinky Lee Show	—	NBC

=== 1960s ===
Year	Program	Nominees	Network
1960 (12th)
1960 (12th)	The Huckleberry Hound Show	William Hanna and Joseph Barbera, producers	Syndicated
1960 (12th)	Captain Kangaroo	—	CBS
1960 (12th)	Lassie	—	CBS
1960 (12th)	Quick Draw McGraw	—	Syndicated
1960 (12th)	Watch Mr. Wizard	—	NBC
1961 (13th)
1961 (13th)	Young People's Concert	—	CBS
1961 (13th)	Captain Kangaroo	—	CBS
1961 (13th)	Huckleberry Hound	—	Syndicated
1961 (13th)	The Shari Lewis Show	—	NBC
1961 (13th)	The Shirley Temple Show	—	NBC
1962 (14th)
1962 (14th)	New York Philharmonic Young People's Concerts with Leonard Bernstein	—	CBS
1962 (14th)	Captain Kangaroo	—	CBS
1962 (14th)	1, 2, 3 Go!	—	NBC
1962 (14th)	The Shari Lewis Show	—	NBC
1962 (14th)	Update	—	NBC
1962 (14th)	Walt Disney's Wonderful World of Color	—	NBC
1963 (15th)
1963 (15th)	Walt Disney's Wonderful World of Color	—	NBC
1963 (15th)	Captain Kangaroo	—	CBS
1963 (15th)	Discovery	—	ABC
1963 (15th)	Mr. Wizard	—	NBC
1963 (15th)	The Shari Lewis Show	—	NBC
1963 (15th)	Update	—	NBC
1964 (16th)
1964 (16th)	Discovery	—	ABC
1964 (16th)	Exploring	—	NBC
1964 (16th)	NBC Children's Theatre	—	NBC
1964 (16th)	Science All Stars	—	ABC
1964 (16th)	Wild Kingdom	—	NBC
1966 (18th)
1966 (18th)	A Charlie Brown Christmas	Lee Mendelson and Bill Melendez, producers	CBS
1966 (18th)	Captain Kangaroo	Al Hyslop, producer	CBS
1966 (18th)	Discovery	Jules Power, executive producer	ABC
1966 (18th)	NBC Children's Theatre "The World of Stuart Little"	George A. Heinemann, producer	NBC
1966 (18th)	Walt Disney's Wonderful World of Color	Walt Disney and Ron W. Miller, executive producers	NBC
1967 (19th)
1967 (19th)	Jack and the Beanstalk	Gene Kelly, producer	CBS
1967 (19th)	Charlie Brown's All Stars!	Lee Mendelson and Bill Melendez, producers	CBS
1967 (19th)	Discovery	Jules Power, executive producer	ABC
1967 (19th)	It's the Great Pumpkin, Charlie Brown	Lee Mendelson and Bill Melendez, producers	CBS
1968 (20th)
1968 (20th)	Outstanding Achievement in Children's Programming (Note: As a juried award, nominees had to garner 50% approval to win the award. None of the nominees met the benchmark and no award was given.)		
1968 (20th)	He's Your Dog, Charlie Brown	Lee Mendelson and Bill Melendez, producers	CBS
1968 (20th)	Mister Rogers' Neighborhood	Fred Rogers, producer	NET
1968 (20th)	You're in Love, Charlie Brown	Lee Mendelson and Bill Melendez, producers	CBS
1968 (20th)	Outstanding Achievement in Children's Programming — Individuals		
1968 (20th)	Mister Rogers' Neighborhood	Fred Rogers, host	NET
1969 (21st)
1969 (21st)	Outstanding Achievement in Children's Programming		
1969 (21st)	Mister Rogers' Neighborhood	Fred Rogers, producer	NET
1969 (21st)	Walt Disney's Wonderful World of Color	Ron W. Miller, executive producer	NBC
1969 (21st)	Outstanding Achievement in Children's Programming — Individuals		
1969 (21st)	Captain Kangaroo	Bob Keeshan, performer	CBS
1969 (21st)	NBC Children's Theatre "The Reluctant Dragon"	Burr Tillstrom, performer	NBC

=== 1970s ===
Year	Program	Nominees	Network
1970 (22nd)
1970 (22nd)	Outstanding Achievement in Children's Programming		
1970 (22nd)	Sesame Street	David Connell, executive producer; Sam Gibbon, Jon Stone and Lutrelle Horne, producers	NET
1970 (22nd)	The Wonderful World of Disney	Ron W. Miller, executive producer	NBC
1970 (22nd)	Outstanding Achievement in Children's Programming — Individuals		
1970 (22nd)	Sesame Street	David Connell, Bruce Hart, Carole Hart, Jerry Juhl, Jeff Moss, Virginia Schone, Ray Sipherd, Jon Stone and Dan Wilcox, writers	NET
1970 (22nd)	Sesame Street	Joe Raposo and Jeff Moss, music and lyrics for "This Way to Sesame Street"	NET
1970 (22nd)	Kukla, Fran and Ollie	Michael Loewenstein, scenic designer	NET
1971 (23rd)
1971 (23rd)	Outstanding Achievement in Children's Programming		
1971 (23rd)	Sesame Street	David Connell, executive producer; Jon Stone and Lutrelle Horne, producers	PBS
1971 (23rd)	Kukla, Fran and Ollie	John J. Sommers and Richard Carter, executive producers	PBS
1971 (23rd)	Outstanding Achievement in Children's Programming — Individuals		
1971 (23rd)	Kukla, Fran and Ollie	Burr Tillstrom, performer	PBS
1971 (23rd)	Sesame Street	George Riesenberger, lighting director	PBS
1972 (24th)
1972 (24th)	Outstanding Achievement in Children's Programming		
1972 (24th)	Sesame Street	David Connell, executive producer; Jon Stone, producer	PBS
1972 (24th)	The Electric Company	David Connell, executive producer; Samuel Y. Gibbon, producer	PBS
1972 (24th)	Outstanding Achievement in Children's Programming — Individuals		
1972 (24th)	Play It Again, Charlie Brown	John Scott Trotter, music director	CBS
1972 (24th)	Sesame Street	George Riesenberger, lighting director	PBS
1973 (25th)
1973 (25th)	Outstanding Achievement in Children's Programming — Informational/Factual		
1973 (25th)	ABC Afterschool Special "Last of the Curlews"	William Hanna and Joseph Barbera, producers	ABC
1973 (25th)	A Picture of Us	Shari Lewis, host	NBC
1973 (25th)	ABC Afterschool Special "Last of the Curlews"	Jameson Brewer, writer	ABC
1973 (25th)	In the News	Joel Heller, executive producer; Pat Lynch and Judy Reemstsma, producers	CBS
1973 (25th)	Make a Wish	Lester Cooper, executive producer; Tom Bywaters, producer	ABC
1973 (25th)	Outstanding Achievement in Children's Programming — Entertainment/Fictional		
1973 (25th)	The Electric Company	Tom Whedon, John Boni, Sara Compton, Tom Dunsmuir, Thad Mumford, Jeremy Stevens and Jim Thurman, writers	PBS
1973 (25th)	Sesame Street	Jon Stone, executive producer; Robert Cunniff, producer	PBS
1973 (25th)	Zoom	Christopher Sarson, producer	PBS
1973 (25th)	The Electric Company	Henry Behar, director	PBS
1973 (25th)	The Electric Company	Samuel Y. Gibbon and David Connell, executive producers; Andy Ferguson, producer	PBS
1973 (25th)	Sesame Street	Robert Myhrum, director	PBS
1973 (25th)	Sesame Street	Joe Raposo, music director	PBS
1973 (25th)	You're Not Elected, Charlie Brown	Charles M. Schulz, writer	CBS
1974 (26th)
1974 (26th)	Outstanding Children's Program		
1974 (26th)	Marlo Thomas and Friends in Free to Be... You and Me	Marlo Thomas, producer/star; Carole Hart, producer	ABC
1974 (26th)	The Borrowers	Duane Bogie, executive producer; Walt deFaria and Warren Lockhart, producers	NBC
1974 (26th)	A Charlie Brown Thanksgiving	Lee Mendelson and Bill Melendez, producers	CBS
1974 (26th)	Outstanding Individual Achievement in Children's Programming		
1974 (26th)	The Borrowers	Bill Zaharuk, art director; Peter Razmofsky, set decorator	NBC
1974 (26th)	A Charlie Brown Thanksgiving	Charles M. Schulz, writer	CBS
1974 (26th)	The Borrowers	Judith Anderson, actress	NBC
1974 (26th)	The Borrowers	Juul Haalmeyer, costume designer	NBC
1974 (26th)	The Borrowers	Walter C. Miller, director	NBC
1974 (26th)	Marlo Thomas and Friends in Free to Be... You and Me	Bill Davis, director	ABC
1975 (27th)
1975 (27th)	Outstanding Children's Program		
1975 (27th)	Yes, Virginia, There Is a Santa Claus	Burt Rosen, executive producer; Bill Melendez and Mort Green, producers	ABC
1975 (27th)	Be My Valentine, Charlie Brown	Lee Mendelson, executive producer; Bill Melendez, producer	CBS
1975 (27th)	Dr. Seuss' The Hoober-Bloob Highway	David H. DePatie, executive producer; Friz Freleng and Dr. Seuss, producers	CBS
1975 (27th)	It's the Easter Beagle, Charlie Brown	Lee Mendelson, executive producer; Bill Melendez, producer	
1976 (28th)
1976 (28th)	Outstanding Children's Program		
1976 (28th)	Huckleberry Finn	Steven North, producer	ABC
1976 (28th)	You're a Good Sport, Charlie Brown	Lee Mendelson, executive producer; Bill Melendez, producer	CBS
1977 (29th)
1977 (29th)	Outstanding Children's Program		
1977 (29th)	Ballet Shoes	John McRae and Joan Sullivan, producers	PBS
1977 (29th)	Hallmark Hall of Fame "Peter Pan"	Gary Smith and Dwight Hemion, executive producers	NBC
1977 (29th)	It's Arbor Day, Charlie Brown	Lee Mendelson, executive producer; Bill Melendez, producer	CBS
1977 (29th)	The Little Drummer Boy Book II	Arthur Rankin Jr. and Jules Bass, producers	NBC
1977 (29th)	Pinocchio	Bernard Rothman and Jack Wohl, producers	CBS
1977 (29th)	Outstanding Individual Achievement in Children's Programming		
1977 (29th)	Hallmark Hall of Fame "Peter Pan"	Jenn de Joux and Elizabeth Savel, video animation	NBC
1977 (29th)	Pinocchio	Jerry Greene, video tape editor	CBS
1977 (29th)	Pinocchio	Bill Hargate, costume designer	CBS
1977 (29th)	The CBS Festival of Lively Arts for Young People "New York Philharmonic Young People's Concert: Making Pictures with Music"	Michael Tilson Thomas, music director	CBS
1977 (29th)	Pinocchio	Stan Winston, Larry Abbott and Edwin Butterworth, makeup	CBS
1978 (30th)
1978 (30th)	Outstanding Children's Program		
1978 (30th)	Halloween Is Grinch Night	David H. DePatie and Friz Freleng, executive producers; Dr. Seuss, producer	ABC
1978 (30th)	The Fat Albert Christmas Special	Lou Scheimer and Norm Prescott, producers	CBS
1978 (30th)	Once Upon a Brothers Grimm	Jay Rayvid, executive producer; Shep Greene and Chiz Schultz, producers	CBS
1978 (30th)	Once Upon a Classic "A Connecticut Yankee in King Arthur's Court"	Bernard Rothman and Jack Wohl, producers	PBS
1978 (30th)	Peter Lundy and the Medicine Hat Stallion	Ed Friendly, producer	NBC
1978 (30th)	Outstanding Individual Achievement in Children's Programming		
1978 (30th)	Once Upon a Brothers Grimm	Bill Hargate, costume designer	CBS
1978 (30th)	Once Upon a Brothers Grimm	Ken Johnson, art director; Robert Checchi, set decorator	CBS
1978 (30th)	Once Upon a Brothers Grimm	Jerry Greene, video tape editor	CBS
1978 (30th)	Once Upon a Brothers Grimm	Tommy Cole, Larry Abbott and Michael Westmore, makeup	CBS
1978 (30th)	Once Upon a Classic "A Connecticut Yankee in King Arthur's Court"	Nicholas Spies and Bob Millslagle, video tape editors	PBS
1979 (31st)
1979 (31st)	Outstanding Children's Program		
1979 (31st)	Christmas Eve on Sesame Street	Jon Stone, executive producer; Dulcy Singer, producer	PBS
1979 (31st)	Benji's Very Own Christmas Story	Joe Camp, producer	ABC
1979 (31st)	Once Upon a Classic	Jay Rayvid, executive producer; James A. DeVinney and Graeme MacDonald, producers	PBS
1979 (31st)	A Special Sesame Street Christmas	Bob Banner, executive producer; Stephen Pouliot, producer	CBS
1979 (31st)	Outstanding Individual Achievement in Children's Programming		
1979 (31st)	Christmas Eve on Sesame Street	Gerri Brioso, graphic artist	PBS
1979 (31st)	Christmas Eve on Sesame Street	Tony Di Girolamo and Dave Clark, lighting directors	PBS

=== 1980s ===
Year	Program	Nominees	Network
1980 (32nd)
1980 (32nd)	Outstanding Children's Program		
1980 (32nd)	Benji at Work	Joe Camp, executive producer; Fielder Baker, producer	ABC
1980 (32nd)	The Halloween That Almost Wasn't	Richard Barclay, executive producer; Gaby Monet, producer	ABC
1980 (32nd)	Sesame Street in Puerto Rico	Al Hyslop, executive producer; Michael Cozell, producer	PBS
1980 (32nd)	Outstanding Individual Achievement in Children's Programming		
1980 (32nd)	The Halloween That Almost Wasn't	Bob O'Bradovich, makeup	ABC
1980 (32nd)	The Halloween That Almost Wasn't	Arthur Ginsberg, film editor	ABC
1980 (32nd)	The Halloween That Almost Wasn't	Mariette Hartley, performer	ABC
1980 (32nd)	Sesame Street in Puerto Rico	Ozzie Alfonso, director	PBS
1980 (32nd)	Sesame Street in Puerto Rico	Nat Mongioi, art director	PBS
1981 (33rd)
1981 (33rd)	Outstanding Children's Program		
1981 (33rd)	Donahue and Kids	Walter Bartlett, executive producer; Don Mischer, producer; Jan Cornell, co-producer	NBC
1981 (33rd)	The Wonderful World of Disney "The Art of Disney Animation"	William Robert Yates, executive producer; Bob King, Phil May and William Reid, producers	NBC
1981 (33rd)	Emmet Otter's Jug-Band Christmas	David Lazer, executive producer; Jim Henson, producer	ABC
1981 (33rd)	The Legend of Sleepy Hollow	Charles Sellier, executive producer; James L. Conway, producer	NBC
1981 (33rd)	Paddington Bear	Pepper Weiss, executive producer; Renate Cole and Graham Clutterbuck, producers	PBS
1981 (33rd)	Outstanding Individual Achievement in Children's Programming		
1981 (33rd)	Donahue and Kids	Don Mischer, director	NBC
1981 (33rd)	Emmet Otter's Jug-Band Christmas	Calista Hendrickson and Sherry Ammott, costume designers	ABC
1981 (33rd)	Emmet Otter's Jug-Band Christmas	Paul Williams, composer/lyricist for "When the River Meets the Sea"	ABC
1981 (33rd)	Emmet Otter's Jug-Band Christmas	Tom Wright, lighting	ABC
1981 (33rd)	The Girl on the Edge of Town	Patty Duke, performer	Syndicated
1982 (34th)
1982 (34th)	Outstanding Children's Program		
1982 (34th)	The Wave	Virginia L. Carter, executive producer; Fern Field, producer	ABC
1982 (34th)	Alice at the Palace	Joseph Papp, producer	NBC
1982 (34th)	The Electric Grandmother	Linda Gottlieb, executive producer; Doro Bachrach, producer	NBC
1982 (34th)	Please Don't Hit Me, Mom	Virginia L. Carter, executive producer; Fern Field, producer	ABC
1982 (34th)	Through the Magic Pyramid	Ron Howard, executive producer; Rance Howard and Herbert Wright, producers	NBC
1982 (34th)	Outstanding Individual Achievement in Children's Programming		
1982 (34th)	Alice at the Palace	Ralph Holmes, lighting designer	NBC
1982 (34th)	Alice at the Palace	Theoni V. Aldredge, costume designer	NBC
1982 (34th)	Rascals and Robbers: The Secret Adventures of Tom Sawyer and Huck Finn	Byron "Buzz" Brandt, film editor	CBS
1982 (34th)	Rascals and Robbers: The Secret Adventures of Tom Sawyer and Huck Finn	Albert Heschong, art director; Warren Welch, set decorator	CBS
1982 (34th)	Rascals and Robbers: The Secret Adventures of Tom Sawyer and Huck Finn	Keith A. Wester, Robert W. Glass Jr., William A. Nicholson and Howard Wilmarth, sound mixing	CBS
1983 (35th)
1983 (35th)	Big Bird in China	Jon Stone, executive producer; Kuo Bao-Xiang, Xu Ja-Cha and David Liu, producers	NBC
1983 (35th)	Grandpa, Will You Run with Me?	Ken Ehrlich, producer	NBC
1983 (35th)	Skeezer	Bill McCutchen, executive producer; Lee Levinson, producer	NBC
1983 (35th)	The Snow Queen: A Skating Ballet	Greg Harney, executive producer; Bernice Olenick, producer	PBS
1984 (36th)
1984 (36th)	He Makes Me Feel Like Dancin'	Edgar J. Scherick and Scott Rudin, executive producers; Emile Ardolino, producer; Judy Kinberg, co-producer	NBC
1984 (36th)	The Best Christmas Pageant Ever	Merrill H. Karpf, executive producer; George Schaefer, producer	ABC
1984 (36th)	Don't Eat the Pictures: Sesame Street at the Metropolitan Museum of Art	Dulcy Singer, executive producer; Lisa Simon, Arlene Sherman and Tony Geiss, producers	PBS
1985 (37th)
1985 (37th)	American Playhouse "Displaced Person"	Allison Maher, Barry Solomon, Rick Traum and Patrick Lynch, executive producers; Patrick Dromgoole, supervising executive producer; Barry Levinson, producer	PBS
1985 (37th)	The Ewok Adventure	George Lucas, executive producer; Thomas G. Smith, producer	ABC
1985 (37th)	The Night They Saved Christmas	Robert Halmi Jr., Jack Haley Jr. and David Niven Jr., executive producers; Robert Halmi Sr., supervising producer; David Kappes, producer	ABC
1985 (37th)	Punky Brewster	David W. Duclon, executive producer; Gary Menteer, supervising producer; Rick Hawkins and Liz Sage, producers	NBC
1985 (37th)	Reading Rainbow	Twila Liggett and Tony Buttino, executive producers; Cecily Truett and Larry Lancit, producers	PBS
1986 (38th)
1986 (38th)	WonderWorks "Anne of Green Gables"	Kevin Sullivan and Lee Polk, executive producers; Ian McDougall, producer	PBS
1986 (38th)	The Disney Sunday Movie "The Girl Who Spelled Freedom"	Judith A. Polone, executive producer; R. W. Goodwin, producer; Christopher Knopf and David A. Simons, co-producers	ABC
1986 (38th)	Ewoks: The Battle for Endor	George Lucas, executive producer; Thomas G. Smith, producer	ABC
1986 (38th)	The 116th Edition of the Ringling Bros. and Barnum & Bailey Circus	Kenneth Feld, executive producer; Steve Binder, producer	CBS
1986 (38th)	Punky Brewster	David W. Duclon, executive producer; Gary Menteer, supervising producer; Rick Hawkins, producer	NBC
1987 (39th)
1987 (39th)	Jim Henson's The Storyteller "Hans My Hedgehog"	Jim Henson, executive producer; Mark Shivas, producer	NBC
1987 (39th)	The Disney Sunday Movie "Young Harry Houdini"	Susan B. Landau, executive producer; James Orr and Jim Cruickshank, producers	ABC
1987 (39th)	Great Moments in Disney Animation	Andrew Solt and Jim Milio, executive producers; Susan F. Walker, supervising producer; Mark Hufnail and Phil Savenick, co-producers	ABC
1987 (39th)	Jim Henson's The Christmas Toy	Diana Birkenfield, executive producer; Jim Henson and Martin G. Baker, producers	ABC
1987 (39th)	WonderWorks "Walk on Air"	Phylis Geller and Lee Polk, executive producers; Ricki Franklin, producer	PBS
1988 (40th)
1988 (40th)	Hallmark Hall of Fame "The Secret Garden"	Norman Rosemont, executive producer; Steve Lanning, producer	CBS
1988 (40th)	Jim Henson's A Muppet Family Christmas	Jim Henson, executive producer; Diana Birkenfield, producer; Martin G. Baker, co-producer	ABC
1988 (40th)	Jim Henson's The Storyteller "The Luckchild"	Jim Henson, executive producer; Duncan Kenworthy, producer	NBC
1988 (40th)	Jim Henson's The Storyteller "A Short Story"	Jim Henson, executive producer; Duncan Kenworthy, producer	NBC
1988 (40th)	Shelley Duvall's Tall Tales & Legends	Shelley Duvall, executive producer; Bridget Terry and Fred Fuchs, producers	Showtime
1989 (41st)
1989 (41st)	Free to Be... a Family	Marlo Thomas, Christopher Cerf, Robert Dalrymple, Leonid Zolotarevsky and Igor Menzelintsev, executive producers; Vern Calhoun, co-producer	ABC
1989 (41st)	I Have AIDS — A Teenager's Story: A 3-2-1 Contact Extra	Al Hyslop, executive producer; Susan Schwartz, producer	PBS
1989 (41st)	The Jim Henson Hour	Jim Henson, executive producer; Duncan Kenworthy, producer/storyteller; Lawrence S. Mirkin, producer; Jerry Juhl and Martin G. Baker, co-producers	NBC
1989 (41st)	WonderWorks "The Lion, the Witch and the Wardrobe"	Paul Stone, executive producer; Jay Rayvid, senior executive producer for WonderWorks; Dale Bell, executive producer for WonderWorks	PBS
1989 (41st)	WonderWorks "Young Charlie Chaplin"	Alan Horrox, executive producer; Jay Rayvid, senior executive producer for WonderWorks; Dale Bell, executive producer for WonderWorks; Colin Shindler, producer	PBS

=== 1990s ===
Year	Program	Producers	Network
1990 (42nd)
1990 (42nd)	A Mother's Courage: The Mary Thomas Story	Ted Field and Robert W. Cort, executive producers; Patricia Clifford and Kate Wright, co-executive producers; Richard L. O'Connor, producer; Chet Walker, co-producer	NBC
1990 (42nd)	All Creatures Great and Small	Bill Sellars, producer	A&E
1990 (42nd)	The Jim Henson Hour "The Song of the Cloud Forest"	Jim Henson, executive producer; Lawrence S. Mirkin, producer; Jerry Juhl, Martin G. Baker and Ritamarie Peruggi, co-producers	NBC
1990 (42nd)	A Yabba-Dabba-Doo Celebration! 50 Years of Hanna-Barbera	Joseph Barbera and William Hanna, executive producers; Bruce Johnson, co-executive producer; Marshall Flaum, producer	TNT
1990 (42nd)	You Don't Look 40, Charlie Brown	Lee Mendelson, producer	CBS
1991 (43rd)
1991 (43rd)	You Can't Go Home Again: A 3-2-1 Contact Extra	Anne MacLeod, executive producer; Tom Cammisa, producer	PBS
1991 (43rd)	Avonlea	Trudy Grant and Kevin Sullivan, executive producers	Disney
1991 (43rd)	Earth to Kids: A Guide to Products for a Healthy Planet	Carole Rosen and Joyce H. Newman, executive producers; Aram Boyajian, producer; Susan Markowitz, co-producer; Betsy Howie, coordinating producer	HBO
1991 (43rd)	Newton's Apple	James Steinbach, executive producer; Richard Hudson, series producer; Kaye Zusmann, coordinating producer	PBS
1991 (43rd)	What's Up Doc? A Salute to Bugs Bunny	Carl H. Lindahl, producer	TNT
1992 (44th)
1992 (44th)	Mark Twain and Me	Geoffrey Cowan and Julian Fowles, executive producers; Daniel Petrie, producer	Disney
1992 (44th)	ABC Afterschool Special "In the Shadow of Love: A Teen AIDS Story"	Judith Stoia, executive producer; Lisa Schmid, producer	PBS
1992 (44th)	Avonlea	Trudy Grant and Kevin Sullivan, executive producers	Disney
1992 (44th)	What Kids Want to Know About Sex and Growing Up: A 3-2-1 Contact Extra	Anne MacLeod, executive producer; Terri Randall, producer	PBS
1992 (44th)	Winnie the Pooh and Christmas Too	Ken Kessel, supervising producer; Jamie Mitchell, Paul and Gaëtan Brizzi, producers	ABC
1993 (45th)
1993 (45th)	Avonlea	Trudy Grant and Kevin Sullivan, executive producers; Brian Leslie Parker, line producer	Disney
1993 (45th)	Beethoven Lives Upstairs	Terence Robinson, executive producer; David Devine and Richard Mozer, producers	HBO
1993 (45th)	Brainstorm: The Truth About Your Brain on Drugs: A 3-2-1 Contact Extra	Anne MacLeod, executive producer; Karen Katz, producer	PBS
1993 (45th)	Dance in America: American Indian Dance Theatre	Barbara Schwei and Hanay Geiogamah, producers	PBS
1993 (45th)	Peter, Paul & Mommy, Too	Bob Glover and Ken Fritz, executive producers; Martha Hertzberg, co-executive producer; Laurie Donnelly, producer; William Cosel, co-producer	PBS
1994 (46th)
1994 (46th)	CBS Schoolbreak Special "Kids Killing Kids / Kids Saving Kids"	Arnold Shapiro, executive producer; David J. Eagle and Kerry Neal, producers; Norman Marcus and Michael Killen, co-producers	CBS
1994 (46th)	Avonlea	Trudy Grant and Kevin Sullivan, executive producers; Nicholas J. Gray, line producer	Disney
1994 (46th)	Clarissa Explains It All "A Little Romance"	Mitchell Kriegman, executive producer; Chris Gifford, producer; Neena Beber, co-producer	Nickelodeon
1994 (46th)	Sesame Street Jam: A Musical Celebration	Arlene Sherman, executive producer	PBS
1994 (46th)	Sesame Street's All-Star 25th Birthday: Stars and Street Forever!	Andrew Solt, executive producer; Marjorie Kalins and Franklin Getchel, co-executive producers; Greg Vines, supervising producer; Joel Lipman, coordinating producer; Victoria Strong and Marc Sachnoff, producers; Emily Squires, co-producer	ABC
1995 (47th)
1995 (47th)	The World Wildlife Fund Presents "Going, Going, Almost Gone! Animals in Danger"	Sheila Nevins, executive producer; Carole Rosen, senior producer; Ellen Goosenberg Kent, producer; Amy Schatz, co-producer	HBO
1995 (47th)	Avonlea	Trudy Grant and Kevin Sullivan, executive producers	Disney
1995 (47th)	In Search of Dr. Seuss	Joni Levin, producer	TNT
1995 (47th)	Lamb Chop and the Haunted Studio	Shari Lewis and Jon Slan, executive producers; Richard Borchiver, co-executive producer; Bernard Rothman, producer; Jack McAdam, co-producer	PBS
1995 (47th)	Smart Kids	John Walsh and Lance Heflin, executive producers; Jay A. Bakerink and Mitchel C. Resnick, producers	Fox
1996 (48th)
1996 (48th)	Peter and the Wolf	George Daugherty, executive producer; David Ka Lik Wong, co-executive producer; Linda Jones Clough and Adrian Workman, producers; Christine Losecaat, co-producer	ABC
1996 (48th)	Avonlea	Trudy Grant and Kevin Sullivan, executive producers	Disney
1996 (48th)	LeVar Burton Presents — A Reading Rainbow Special: Act Against Violence	Tony Buttino and LeVar Burton, executive producers; Twila Liggett, Cecily Truett, Larry Lancit, Orly Berger-Wiseman, Robin Fogelman, Mark Mannucci, Stacey Raider, Ronnie Krauss, Jill Gluckson and Kathy Kinsner, producers	PBS
1996 (48th)	Marsalis On Music	Peter Gelb and Pat Jaffe, executive producers; Laura Mitgang and Daniel Anker, producers	PBS
1996 (48th)	Nick News Special Edition — Clearing the Air: Kids Talk to the President About Smoking	Linda Ellerbee and Rolfe Tessem, executive producers; Mark Lyons and Chichi Pierce, supervising producers; Murr LeBay, coordinating producer; Bob Brienza, producer	Nickelodeon
1997 (49th)
1997 (49th)	How Do You Spell God?	Sheila Nevins, executive producer; Carole Rosen, senior producer; Ellen Goosenberg Ken and Amy Schatz, producers	HBO
1997 (49th)	About Us: The Dignity of Children	Fred Berner, Debra Reynolds and Jeffrey D. Jacobs, executive producers; Tracy A. Mitchell, supervising producer; Lesley Karsten, producer; Elaine Frontain Bryant, associate producer	ABC
1997 (49th)	It Just Takes One	Bonnie Hammer, executive producer; Ellen Weissbrod, producer; Lorna Thomas, co-producer	USA
1997 (49th)	Smoke Alarm: The Unfiltered Truth About Cigarettes	Joyce H. Newman and Sheila Nevins, executive producers; Carole Rosen, senior producer; Lila Corn, coordinating producer; Gabriella Messina, line producer; John Hoffman, producer	HBO
1997 (49th)	The Wubbulous World of Dr. Seuss	Brian Henson, David Steven Cohen and Michael K. Frith, executive producers; Lou Berger, supervising producer; Jonathan Meath and Lauren Gray, producers; David Gumpel, co-producer	Nickelodeon
1998 (50th)
1998 (50th)	Muppets Tonight	Brian Henson and Dick Blasucci, executive producers; Paul Flaherty and Kirk R. Thatcher, supervising producers; Patric M. Verrone, Martin G. Baker and Chris Plourde, producers; Bernie Keating and Jim Lewis, co-producers	Disney
1998 (50th)	Nick News Special Edition: What Are You Staring At?	Linda Ellerbee and Rolfe Tessem, executive producers; Mark Lyons, senior producer; Anne-Marie Cunniffe, producer	Nickelodeon
1998 (50th)	Absent Minded Inventions and the Search for Flubber with Bill Nye the Science Guy	James McKenna and Erren Gottlieb, executive producers; Michele Bornheim, supervising producer; Jamie Hammond, coordinating producer	ABC
1998 (50th)	Nick News Special Edition — Divorce: Caught in the Middle	Linda Ellerbee and Rolfe Tessem, executive producers; Mark Lyons, senior producer; Anne-Marie Cunniffe, producer	Nickelodeon
1998 (50th)	The Wubbulous World of Dr. Seuss	Brian Henson, David Steven Cohen and Michael K. Frith, executive producers; Lou Berger, supervising producer; Bob Stein and Lauren Gray, producers; David Gumpel, co-producer; Will Ryan, consulting producer	Nickelodeon
1999 (51st)
1999 (51st)	The Truth About Drinking: The Teen Files	Arnold Shapiro, executive producer; Allison Grodner, supervising producer; Michael Rabb, producer	Syndicated
1999 (51st)	Nick News Special Edition: The Clinton Crisis	Linda Ellerbee and Rolfe Tessem, executive producers; Wally Berger, supervising producer; Mark Lyons, senior producer; Anne-Marie Cunniffe, producer	Nickelodeon
1999 (51st)	Rosie O'Donnell's Kids Are Punny	Rosie O'Donnell and Sheila Nevins, executive producers; Carole Rosen, senior producer; Diane Kolyer, line producer; Amy Schatz, producer	HBO
1999 (51st)	Rugrats	Gábor Csupó and Arlene Klasky, executive producers; Eryk Casemiro and Margot Pipkin, coordinating producers; Paul Demeyer, creative producer; Cella Nichols Harris, producer	Nickelodeon
1999 (51st)	A Winnie the Pooh Thanksgiving	Walt Disney Television Animation	ABC

=== 2000s ===
Year	Program	Producers	Network
2000 (52nd)
2000 (52nd)	The Color of Friendship	Alan Sacks, executive producer; Kevin Hooks and Christopher Morgan, producers	Disney
2000 (52nd)	Goodnight Moon and Other Sleepytime Tales	Sheila Nevins, executive producer; Carole Rosen, supervising producer; Amy Schatz, producer	HBO
2000 (52nd)	Disney's Young Musicians Symphony Orchestra in Concert	Gary Smith and Dwight Hemion, executive producers; Gail Purse, producer	Disney
2000 (52nd)	Here's to You, Charlie Brown: 50 Great Years	Lee Mendelson, executive producer; Walter C. Miller, producer	CBS
2000 (52nd)	Rugrats	Gábor Csupó and Arlene Klasky, executive producers; Eryk Casemiro, supervising producer; Jim Duffy, Cella Nichols Harris and Susan Ward, producers	Nickelodeon
2001 (53rd)
2001 (53rd)	The Teen Files: Surviving High School	Arnold Shapiro, executive producer; Allison Grodner, supervising producer/writer/director; Karen Duzy, producer	UPN
2001 (53rd)	King Gimp	Sheila Nevins and Nancy Walzog, executive producers; Lisa Heller, supervising producer; Susan Hadary and William Whiteford, producers	HBO
2001 (53rd)	Nick News with Linda Ellerbee	Linda Ellerbee and Rolfe Tessem, executive producers; Wally Berger, supervising producer; Mark Lyons, produced by	Nickelodeon
2001 (53rd)	Peter Pan Starring Cathy Rigby	Tom McCoy, Kris Slava and David Walmsley, executive producers; Marc Bauman, producer	A&E
2001 (53rd)	Rugrats	Gábor Csupó and Arlene Klasky, executive producers; Eryk Casemiro, co-executive producer; Jim Duffy and Cella Nichols Harris, supervising producers; Kate Boutilier, producer; Pernelle Hayes and Susan Ward, produced by	Nickelodeon
2002 (54th)
2002 (54th)	Nick News Special Edition — Faces of Hope: The Kids of Afghanistan	Linda Ellerbee and Rolfe Tessem, executive producers; Wally Berger, supervising producer; Josh Veselka, producer; Mark Lyons, produced by	Nickelodeon
2002 (54th)	The Making of "A Charlie Brown Christmas"	Lee Mendelson, executive producer; Jacob Mendelson, producer	ABC
2002 (54th)	Nick News with Linda Ellerbee	Linda Ellerbee and Rolfe Tessem, executive producers; Wally Berger, supervising producer; Mark Lyons, produced by	Nickelodeon
2002 (54th)	Rugrats	Gábor Csupó and Arlene Klasky, executive producers; Eryk Casemiro, co-executive producer; Jim Duffy and Cella Nichols Harris, supervising producers; Kate Boutilier, producer; Pernelle Hayes and Susan Ward, produced by	Nickelodeon
2002 (54th)	SpongeBob SquarePants	Stephen Hillenburg, executive producer	Nickelodeon
2003 (55th)
2003 (55th)	Through a Child's Eyes: September 11, 2001	Sheila Nevins, executive producer; Dolores Morris, supervising producer; Lynn Sadofsky and Amy Schatz, producers	HBO
2003 (55th)	Kermit's Swamp Years	Jim Lewis and Michael R. Polis, executive producers; Ritamarie Peruggi, producer	Starz
2003 (55th)	Lizzie McGuire	Susan Estelle Jansen and Stan Rogow, executive producers; Tim Maile and Douglas Tuber, co-executive producers; Melissa Gould, supervising producer; Jill Danton, producer	Disney
2003 (55th)	Nick News Special Edition — The Iraq Question: American Kids Talk About War	Linda Ellerbee and Rolfe Tessem, executive producers; Wally Berger, supervising producer; Mark Lyons, produced by	Nickelodeon
2003 (55th)	Nick News Special Edition: My Family Is Different	Linda Ellerbee and Rolfe Tessem, executive producers; Wally Berger, supervising producer; Mark Lyons, produced by	Nickelodeon
2004 (56th)
2004 (56th)	Happy to Be Nappy and Other Stories of Me	Sheila Nevins, executive producer; Dolores Morris, supervising producer; Ellen Goosenberg Kent and Diane Kolyer, producers	HBO
2004 (56th)	Lizzie McGuire	Susan Estelle Jansen and Stan Rogow, executive producers; Tim Maile and Douglas Tuber, co-executive producers; Melissa Gould, supervising producer; Jill Danton, producer	Disney
2004 (56th)	Nick News Special Edition — Courage to Live: Kids, South Africa and AIDS	Linda Ellerbee and Rolfe Tessem, executive producers; Wally Berger, supervising producer; Josh Veselka, producer; Mark Lyons, produced by	Nickelodeon
2004 (56th)	Nick News Special Edition — There's No Place Like Home: Homeless Kids in America	Linda Ellerbee and Rolfe Tessem, executive producers; Wally Berger, supervising producer; Josh Veselka, producer; Mark Lyons, produced by	Nickelodeon
2004 (56th)	Sesame Street Presents "The Street We Live On"	Dr. Lewis Bernstein, executive producer; Kevin Clash, co-executive producer; Tim Carter, Melissa Dino, Karen Ialacci and Carol-Lynn Parente, producers	PBS
2005 (57th)
2005 (57th)	Classical Baby	Sheila Nevins, executive producer; Dolores Morris, supervising producer; Sabina Barach, Gina B. Legnani, Beth Levison, Elissa W. Patterson, Amy Schatz and Elisabeth K. Wolfe, producers	HBO
2005 (57th)	Nick News with Linda Ellerbee: Never Again? From the Holocaust to the Sudan	Linda Ellerbee and Rolfe Tessem, executive producers; Wally Berger, supervising producer; Mark Lyons and Martin Toub, produced by	Nickelodeon
2005 (57th)	Pride	Simon Curtis, Delia Fine and Laura Mackie, executive producers; Emilio Nunez, supervising producer, John Downer and Christopher Hall, produced by	A&E
2005 (57th)	That's So Raven	David Brookwell, Sean McNamara, Marc Warren and Dennis Rinsler, executive producers; Dava Savel, co-executive producer; Michael Carrington, supervising producer; Sarah Jane Cunningham and Suzie V. Freeman, producers; Patty Gary-Cox, produced by	Disney
2005 (57th)	Zoey 101	Jan Korbelin and Dan Schneider, executive producers; Bill O'Dowd, producer	Nickelodeon
2006 (58th)
2006 (58th)	High School Musical	Bill Borden and Barry Rosenbush, executive producers; Don Schain, produced by	Disney
2006 (58th)	I Have Tourette's but Tourette's Doesn't Have Me	Sheila Nevins, executive producer; Dolores Morris, supervising producer; Ellen Goosenberg Kent, producer	HBO
2006 (58th)	Classical Baby 2	Sheila Nevins, executive producer; Dolores Morris, supervising producer; Sabina Barach, Beth Levison and Amy Schatz, producers	HBO
2006 (58th)	Nick News with Linda Ellerbee: Do Something! Caring for the Kids of Katrina	Linda Ellerbee and Rolfe Tessem, executive producers; Wally Berger, supervising producer; Christine Bachas, Holden Kepecs, Mark Lyons, Kara Pothier, Martin Toub and Joshua Veselka, producers	Nickelodeon
2007 (59th)
2007 (59th)	Nick News with Linda Ellerbee — Private Worlds: Kids and Autism	Rolfe Tessem, executive producer; Wally Berger, supervising producer; Mark Lyons, producer; Martin Toub and Kara Pothier, produced by	Nickelodeon
2007 (59th)	Hannah Montana	Michael Poryes and Steven Peterman, executive producers; Sally Lapiduss and Douglas Lieblein, co-executive producers; Richard G. King, produced by	Disney
2007 (59th)	The Suite Life of Zack & Cody	Danny Kallis, Irene Dreayer and Pamela Eells O'Connell, executive producers; Jim Geoghan, co-executive producer; Walter Barnett, produced by	Disney
2007 (59th)	That's So Raven	Marc Warren and Dennis Rinsler, executive producers; Patty Gary-Cox and Michael Carrington, co-executive producers; Michael Feldman, supervising producer	Disney
2007 (59th)	When Parents Are Deployed	Christina Delfico, executive producer; Joseph Pipher, producer	PBS
2008 (60th)
2008 (60th)	Classical Baby (I'm Grown Up Now): The Poetry Show	Sheila Nevins, executive producer; Dolores Morris, supervising producer; Amy Schatz, produced by; Beth Aala, producer	HBO
2008 (60th)	Nick News with Linda Ellerbee: The Untouchable Kids of India	Linda Ellerbee and Rolfe Tessem, executive producers; Wally Berger, supervising producer; Mark Lyons, producer; Josh Veselka, produced by	Nickelodeon
2008 (60th)	Hannah Montana	Michael Poryes and Steven Peterman, executive producers; Richard G. King, Sally Lapiduss and Andrew Green, co-executive producers	Disney
2008 (60th)	High School Musical 2	Bill Borden and Barry Rosenbush, executive producers; Don Schain, produced by	Disney
2008 (60th)	The Suite Life of Zack & Cody	Danny Kallis, Irene Dreayer, Pamela Eells O'Connell and Jim Geoghan, executive producers; Walter Barnett, co-executive producer	Disney
2009 (61st)
2009 (61st)	Outstanding Children's Program		
2009 (61st)	Wizards of Waverly Place	Peter Murrieta, Todd J. Greenwald, Vince Cheung and Ben Montanio, executive producers; Matt Goldman, co-executive producer; Greg A. Hampson, produced by	Disney
2009 (61st)	Hannah Montana	Michael Poryes and Steven Peterman, executive producers; Douglas Lieblein and Andrew Green, co-executive producers; Richard G. King, produced by	Disney
2009 (61st)	iCarly	Dan Schneider, executive producer; Robin Weiner, supervising producer; Joe Catania, producer; Bruce Rand Berman, produced by	Nickelodeon
2009 (61st)	Outstanding Children's Nonfiction Program		
2009 (61st)	Grandpa, Do You Know Who I Am? with Maria Shriver	Sheila Nevins and Maria Shriver, executive producers; Veronica Brady, supervising producer; John Hoffman, series producer; Eamon Harrington and John Watkin, produced by	HBO
2009 (61st)	Nick News with Linda Ellerbee — Coming Home: When Parents Return from War	Linda Ellerbee and Rolfe Tessem, executive producers; Wally Berger, supervising producer; Mark Lyons, producer; Martin Toub, produced by	Nickelodeon

=== 2010s ===
Year	Program	Producers	Network
2010 (62nd)
2010 (62nd)	Outstanding Children's Program		
2010 (62nd)	Wizards of Waverly Place: The Movie	Peter Murrieta, executive producer; Kevin Lafferty, produced by	Disney
2010 (62nd)	Hannah Montana	Michael Poryes and Steven Peterman, executive producers; Douglas Lieblein and Andrew Green, co-executive producers; Richard G. King, produced by	Disney
2010 (62nd)	iCarly	Dan Schneider, executive producer; Robin Weiner, supervising producer; Joe Catania, producer; Bruce Rand Berman, produced by	Nickelodeon
2010 (62nd)	Jonas	Michael Curtis and Roger S. H. Schulman, executive producers; Ivan Menchell, co-executive producer; Greg A. Hampson, producer	Disney
2010 (62nd)	Wizards of Waverly Place	Peter Murrieta, Todd J. Greenwald, Vince Cheung and Ben Montanio, executive producers; Perry Rein and Gigi McCreery, co-executive producers; Greg A. Hampson, produced by	Disney
2010 (62nd)	Outstanding Children's Nonfiction Program		
2010 (62nd)	Nick News with Linda Ellerbee — The Face of Courage: Kids Living with Cancer	Linda Ellerbee and Rolfe Tessem, executive producers; Wally Berger, supervising producer; Mark Lyons, producer; Martin Toub, produced by	Nickelodeon
2010 (62nd)	When Families Grieve	Christina Delfico, Lisa Lax, Nancy Stern, Rob Burnett and David Letterman, executive producers; Andrew Ames, supervising producer; Kevin Clash, producer	PBS
2011 (63rd)
2011 (63rd)	Outstanding Children's Program		
2011 (63rd)	A Child's Garden of Poetry	Sheila Nevins, executive producer; Jacqueline Glover, supervising producer; Amy Schatz, produced by; Beth Aala and Beth Levison, producers	HBO
2011 (63rd)	Degrassi	Linda Schuyler, Stephen Stohn and Brendon Yorke, executive producers; Stephanie Williams, supervising producer; Stefan Brogren and David Lowe, producers	Nickelodeon
2011 (63rd)	iCarly	Dan Schneider, executive producer; Robin Weiner and George Doty IV, supervising producers; Joe Catania, producer; Bruce Rand Berman, produced by	Nickelodeon
2011 (63rd)	Victorious	Dan Schneider, executive producer; Robin Weiner, supervising producer; Bruce Rand Berman and Joe Catania, producers	Nickelodeon
2011 (63rd)	Wizards of Waverly Place	Todd J. Greenwald, Vince Cheung and Ben Montanio, executive producers; Perry Rein and Gigi McCreery, co-executive producers; Richard Goodman, supervising producer; Greg A. Hampson, producer	Disney
2011 (63rd)	Outstanding Children's Nonfiction Program		
2011 (63rd)	Nick News with Linda Ellerbee — Under the Influence: Kids of Alcoholics	Linda Ellerbee and Rolfe Tessem, executive producers; Wally Berger, supervising producer; Mark Lyons, producer; Martin Toub, produced by	Nickelodeon
2011 (63rd)	A YoungArts Masterclass	Lin Arison, executive producer; Karen Goodman and Kirk Simon, produced by	HBO
2012 (64th)
2012 (64th)	Outstanding Children's Program		
2012 (64th)	Wizards of Waverly Place	Todd J. Greenwald, Vince Cheung and Ben Montanio, executive producers; Perry Rein and Gigi McCreery, co-executive producers; Richard Goodman, supervising producer; Greg A. Hampson, producer	Disney
2012 (64th)	Degrassi	Linda Schuyler, Stephen Stohn and Brendon Yorke, executive producers; Sarah Glinski, co-executive producer; Stephanie Williams, supervising producer; Stefan Brogren, series producer; David Lowe, producer	Nickelodeon
2012 (64th)	Good Luck Charlie	Dan Staley, Drew Vaupen and Phil Baker, executive producers; Christopher Vane, Erika Kaestle and Patrick McCarthy, co-executive producers; Pixie Wespiser, produced by	Disney
2012 (64th)	iCarly	Dan Schneider, executive producer; Robin Weiner, co-executive producer; Joe Catania, supervising producer; Jake Farrow and Matt Fleckenstein, producers; Bruce Rand Berman, produced by	Nickelodeon
2012 (64th)	Victorious	Dan Schneider, executive producer; Warren Bell and Robin Weiner, co-executive producers; Joe Catania, supervising producer; Bruce Rand Berman and Matt Fleckenstein, producers	Nickelodeon
2012 (64th)	Outstanding Children's Nonfiction Program		
2012 (64th)	Sesame Street: Growing Hope Against Hunger	Carol-Lynn Parente, executive producer; Melissa Dino, supervising producer; Mason Rather, senior producer; Kevin Clash, producer	PBS
2012 (64th)	It Gets Better	Christy Spitzer, Shannon Fitzgerald, John Ferriter, Brian Pines, Dan Savage, Ted Skillman and Belisa Balaban, executive producers	MTV
2012 (64th)	The Weight of the Nation for Kids: The Great Cafeteria Takeover	Sheila Nevins and John Hoffman, executive producers; Shari Cookson and Nick Doob, produced by	HBO
2013 (65th)
2013 (65th)	Nick News with Linda Ellerbee — Forgotten But Not Gone: Kids, HIV & AIDS	Linda Ellerbee and Rolfe Tessem, executive producers; Wally Berger, supervising producer; Mark Lyons, producer; Martin Toub and Wendy Lobel, produced by	Nickelodeon
2013 (65th)	Good Luck Charlie	Dan Staley, Drew Vaupen and Phil Baker, executive producers; Christopher Vane, Erika Kaestle, Patrick McCarthy and Jim Gerkin, co-executive producers; Pixie Wespiser, produced by	Disney
2013 (65th)	iCarly	Dan Schneider, executive producer; Robin Weiner, co-executive producer; Joe Catania, supervising producer; Jake Farrow, producer; Bruce Rand Berman, produced by	Nickelodeon
2013 (65th)	The Weight of the Nation for Kids: Quiz Ed!	Sheila Nevins and John Hoffman, executive producers; Shari Cookson and Nick Doob, produced by	HBO
2013 (65th)	A YoungArts Masterclass	Sheila Nevins and Lin Arison, executive producers; Jacqueline Glover, supervising producer; Karen Goodman and Kirk Simon, produced by	HBO
2014 (66th)
2014 (66th)	One Last Hug: Three Days at Grief Camp	Sheila Nevins, executive producer; Sara Bernstein, supervising producer; Greg DeHart and Paul Freedman, produced by	HBO
2014 (66th)	Degrassi	Linda Schuyler, Stephen Stohn and Sarah Glinski, executive producers; Matt Huether, co-executive producer; Stephanie Williams, supervising producer; Stefan Brogren and David Lowe, producers	Nickelodeon
2014 (66th)	Dog with a Blog	Michael B. Kaplan, executive producer; Jim Hope, co-executive producer; Leo Clarke, produced by	Disney
2014 (66th)	Good Luck Charlie	Dan Staley, Drew Vaupen and Phil Baker, executive producers; Christopher Vane, Erika Kaestle, Patrick McCarthy and Jim Gerkin, co-executive producers; Pixie Wespiser, produced by	Disney
2014 (66th)	Nick News with Linda Ellerbee — Family Secrets: When Violence Hits Home	Linda Ellerbee and Rolfe Tessem, executive producers; Wally Berger, supervising producer; Mark Lyons, producer; Martin Toub, produced by	Nickelodeon
2014 (66th)	Wynton Marsalis — A YoungArts Masterclass	Sheila Nevins and Lin Arison, executive producers; Jacqueline Glover, supervising producer; Karen Goodman and Kirk Simon, produced by	HBO
2015 (67th)
2015 (67th)	Alan Alda and the Actor Within You: A YoungArts Masterclass	Sheila Nevins and Lin Arison, executive producers; Jacqueline Glover, supervising producer; Karen Goodman and Kirk Simon, produced by	HBO
2015 (67th)	Degrassi	Linda Schuyler, Stephen Stohn and Sarah Glinski, executive producers; Matt Huether, co-executive producer; Stephanie Williams, supervising producer; Stefan Brogren and David Lowe, producers	Nickelodeon
2015 (67th)	Dog with a Blog	Michael B. Kaplan, executive producer; Jim Hope, co-executive producer; Jessica Kaminsky, supervising producer; Leo Clarke, produced by	Disney
2015 (67th)	Girl Meets World	Michael Jacobs, executive producer; Frank Pace, Matthew Nelson, Mark Blutman and Jeff Menell, co-executive producers	Disney
2015 (67th)	Nick News with Linda Ellerbee: Coming Out	Linda Ellerbee and Rolfe Tessem, executive producers; Wally Berger, supervising producer; Mark Lyons, producer; Martin Toub, produced by	Nickelodeon
2016 (68th)
2016 (68th)	It's Your 50th Christmas, Charlie Brown!	Lee Mendelson, Jason Mendelson and Paul Miller, executive producers	ABC
2016 (68th)	Dog with a Blog	Michael B. Kaplan, executive producer; Jim Hope, co-executive producer; Jessica Kaminsky, supervising producer; Leo Clarke, produced by	Disney
2016 (68th)	Girl Meets World	Michael Jacobs, executive producer; Frank Pace, Matthew Nelson, Mark Blutman and Jeff Menell, co-executive producers; Randi Barnes, producer	Disney
2016 (68th)	Nick News with Linda Ellerbee: Hello, I Must Be Going! 25 Years of Nick News with Linda Ellerbee	Linda Ellerbee and Rolfe Tessem, executive producers; Wally Berger, supervising producer; Mark Lyons, senior producer; Martin Toub and Wendy Lobel, producers; Josh Veselka, produced by	Nickelodeon
2016 (68th)	School of Rock	Jim Armogida, Steve Armogida and Jay Kogen, executive producers; Eric Friedman, Perry Rein and Gigi McCreery, co-executive producers; Dionne Kirschner, producer	Nickelodeon
2017 (69th)
2017 (69th)	Once Upon a Sesame Street Christmas	Brown Johnson, executive producer; Ken Scarborough, co-executive producer; Benjamin Lehmann, supervising producer; Karyn Leibovich, Stephanie Longard and Mindy Fila, producers	HBO
2017 (69th)	Girl Meets World	Michael Jacobs, executive producer; Frank Pace, Matthew Nelson, Mark Blutman and Jeff Menell, co-executive producers	Disney
2017 (69th)	Macy's Thanksgiving Day Parade 90th Celebration	Brad Lachman, executive producer; Bill Bracken, co-executive producer; Matt Lachman, producer	NBC
2017 (69th)	School of Rock	Jim Armogida, Steve Armogida, Jay Kogen, Scott Rudin, Eli Bush and Richard Linklater, executive producers; Steve Skrovan, Sarah Jane Cunningham and Suzie V. Freeman, co-executive producers; Harry Hannigan, producer; Chris Arrington, produced by	Nickelodeon
2017 (69th)	Star Wars Rebels	Simon Kinberg and Dave Filoni, executive producers; Henry Gilroy, co-executive producer; Kiri Hart, Carrie Beck and Athena Yvette Portillo, producers	Disney XD
2018 (70th)
2018 (70th)	The Magical Wand Chase: A Sesame Street Special	Brown Johnson, Ken Scarborough and Jason Diamond, executive producers; Benjamin Lehmann, supervising producer; Mindy Fila, Karyn Leibovich, Stephanie Longardo and Scott Gracheff, producers	HBO
2018 (70th)	Alexa & Katie	Matthew Carlson and Heather Wordham, executive producers; Gary Murphy, co-executive producer; Bob Heath, producer	Netflix
2018 (70th)	Fuller House	Jeff Franklin, Thomas L. Miller and Robert L. Boyett, executive producers; Marsh McCall, Bryan Behar and Steve Baldikoski, co-executive producers	Netflix
2018 (70th)	A Series of Unfortunate Events	Daniel Handler, Neil Patrick Harris, Rose Lam, Barry Sonnenfeld and Jon Weber, executive producers	Netflix
2018 (70th)	Star Wars Rebels	Simon Kinberg and Dave Filoni, executive producers; Henry Gilroy, co-executive producer; Kiri Hart, Carrie Beck and Athena Yvette Portillo, producers	Disney XD
2019 (71st)
2019 (71st)	When You Wish Upon a Pickle: A Sesame Street Special	Brown Johnson, Benjamin Lehmann and Ken Scarborough, executive producers; Mindy Fila, Karyn Leibovich and Stephanie Longardo, producers	HBO
2019 (71st)	Carmen Sandiego	Caroline Fraser, CJ Kettler, Kirsten Newlands and Anne Loi, executive producers; Duane Capizzi, co-executive producers; Brian Hulme, producer	Netflix
2019 (71st)	A Series of Unfortunate Events	Daniel Handler, Neil Patrick Harris, Rose Lam and Barry Sonnenfeld, executive producers; Joe Tracz and Rand Geiger, producers	Netflix
2019 (71st)	Song of Parkland	Nancy Abraham and Lisa Heller, executive producers; Sara Rodriguez, supervising producer; Amy Schatz, produced by	HBO
2019 (71st)	Star Wars Resistance	Dave Filoni, Brandon Auman, Athena Yvette Portillo and Justin Ridge, executive producers	Disney

=== 2020s ===
Year	Program	Producers	Network
2020 (72nd)
2020 (72nd)	Jim Henson's The Dark Crystal: Age of Resistance (TIE)	Lisa Henson, Halle Stanford and Louis Leterrier, executive producers; Jeffrey Addiss, Will Matthews, Javier Grillo-Marxuach and Blanca Lista; co-executive producers; Ritamarie Peruggi, produced by	Netflix
2020 (72nd)	We Are the Dream: The Kids of the Oakland MLK Oratorical Fest (TIE)	Mahershala Ali, Amatus Karim Ali, Mimi Valdés and Julie Anderson, executive producers; Amy Schatz and Diane Kolyer, produced by	HBO
2020 (72nd)	Star Wars Resistance	Brandon Auman, Athena Yvette Portillo, Dave Filoni, Justin Ridge, Sareana Sun and Shuzo John Shiota, executive producers; Daisy Fang and Jack Liang; producers	Disney

== Programs with multiple awards ==
10 awards

- Sesame Street

9 awards

- Nick News with Linda Ellerbee

3 awards

- Time for Beany

2 awards

- Classical Baby
- Hallmark Hall of Fame
- Lassie
- The Teen Files
- Wizards of Waverly Place

== Programs with multiple nominations ==
22 nominations

- Nick News with Linda Ellerbee

17 nominations

- Sesame Street

7 nominations

- Kukla, Fran and Ollie

6 nominations

- Avonlea

5 nominations

- Captain Kangaroo
- iCarly
- Wizards of Waverly Place

4 nominations

- Degrassi
- Discovery
- Hannah Montana
- Rugrats
- 3-2-1 Contact
- Time for Beany
- Walt Disney's Wonderful World of Color
- WonderWorks
- A YoungArts Masterclass

3 nominations

- Classical Baby
- Ding Dong School
- Dog with a Blog
- Good Luck Charlie
- Girl Meets World
- Hallmark Hall of Fame
- Jim Henson's The Storyteller
- Lassie
- The Shari Lewis Show
- Zoo Parade

2 nominations

- ABC Afterschool Special
- Big Top
- The Disney Sunday Movie
- The Electric Company
- High School Musical
- Howdy Doody
- Huckleberry Hound
- The Jim Henson Hour
- Lizzie McGuire
- Mister Rogers' Neighborhood
- NBC Children's Theatre
- Once Upon a Classic
- Punky Brewster
- Reading Rainbow
- School of Rock
- A Series of Unfortunate Events
- Star Wars Rebels
- Star Wars Resistance
- The Suite Life of Zack & Cody
- Super Circus
- The Teen Files
- That's So Raven
- Update
- Victorious
- Watch Mr. Wizard
- The Weight of the Nation for Kids
- The Wonderful World of Disney
- The Wubbulous World of Dr. Seuss
- Young People's Concerts
