= Lisa Simon =

American television producer and director

Lisa Simon (April 4, 1951 — April 4, 2015) was an American television producer and director.

== Positions held ==
- Assistant Director on Chavez (2006)
- Production Assistant on Law & Order: Special Victims Unit (2008)
- Consulting Producer on Wonder Pets (2006–2007)
- Director on Between the Lions and Sesame Street (2005–2007) and Bear in the Big Blue House
- Production Assistant on Cloverfield and The Flight of the Conchords (2007–2008)

== Awards and nominations ==
Simon was nominated for a Primetime Emmy award in the category Outstanding Children's Program, for her work on Don't Eat the Pictures: Sesame Street at the Metropolitan Museum of Art, in 1984. The nomination was shared with Dulcy Singer, Arlene Sherman, and Tony Geiss.

Simon was nominated for fourteen Daytime Emmy awards in the categories Outstanding Children's Informational/Instructive Series, Outstanding Children's Series, Outstanding Preschool Children's Series, and Outstanding Directing in a Children's Series, for her work on Sesame Street and Between the Lions.
