= Arlene Sherman =

American television producer

Arlene Sherman (September 12, 1947 – October 1, 2008) was an American television producer, known for PBS children’s television series Sesame Street.

== Positions held ==
- Producer on Don't Eat the Pictures: Sesame Street at the Metropolitan Museum of Art (1983)
- Executive Producer on Sesame Street Jam: A Musical Celebration (1994), Elmo's World: The Wild Wild West (2002), Sesame Street: Computer Caper (2002), Sesame Street: Healthy, Happy Monsters (2004), What's the Name of That Song (2004), and Sesame Street: Friends to the Rescue (2005)
- Co-executive-producer on Elmo's World: Reach for the Sky (2006), Elmo's World: Pets! (2006), and Elmo's World: What Makes You Happy? (2007)

== Awards and nominations ==
Sherman received two Primetime Emmy award nominations in the category Outstanding Children's Program, for her work on Don't Eat the Pictures: Sesame Street at the Metropolitan Museum of Art and Sesame Street Jam: A Musical Celebration. She was nominated in 1984 and 1994. Her first nomination was shared with Dulcy Singer, Lisa Simon, and Tony Geiss.

She has also been nominated for ten Daytime Emmy awards in the categories Outstanding Children's Series, and Outstanding Pre-school Children's Series, for her work on Sesame Street. She was nominated from 1991 to 2003, and won all ten awards. Her first win was shared with Dulcy Singer and Lisa Simon.
