= Eskimo curlew =

- One of four known photographs of a living Eskimo curlew, taken by Don Bleitz on Galveston Island in 1962

Conservation status
- Critically endangered, possibly extinct (IUCN 3.1)
- CITES Appendix I

Scientific classification
- Kingdom: Animalia
- Phylum: Chordata
- Class: Aves
- Order: Charadriiformes
- Family: Scolopacidae
- Genus: Numenius
- Species: N. borealis

Binomial name
- Numenius borealis (Forster, 1772)

Species of bird

The Eskimo curlew (Numenius borealis), also known as northern curlew, is a species of curlew in the family Scolopacidae. It was one of the most numerous shorebirds in the tundra of western Arctic Canada and Alaska. Thousands of birds were then killed per year in the late 1800s. As there has not been a reliable sighting since 1987 or a confirmed sighting since 1963, the Eskimo curlew is considered Critically Endangered or possibly extinct. The bird is about 30 cm (12 in) long and feeds mostly on insects and berries.

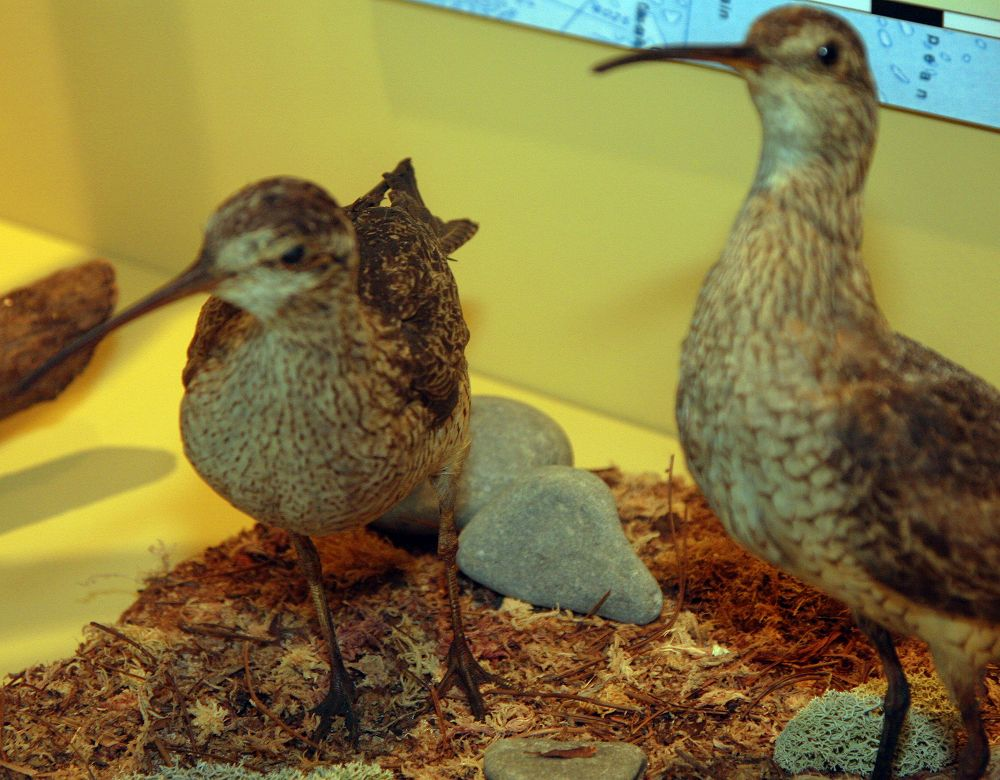

== Taxonomy ==
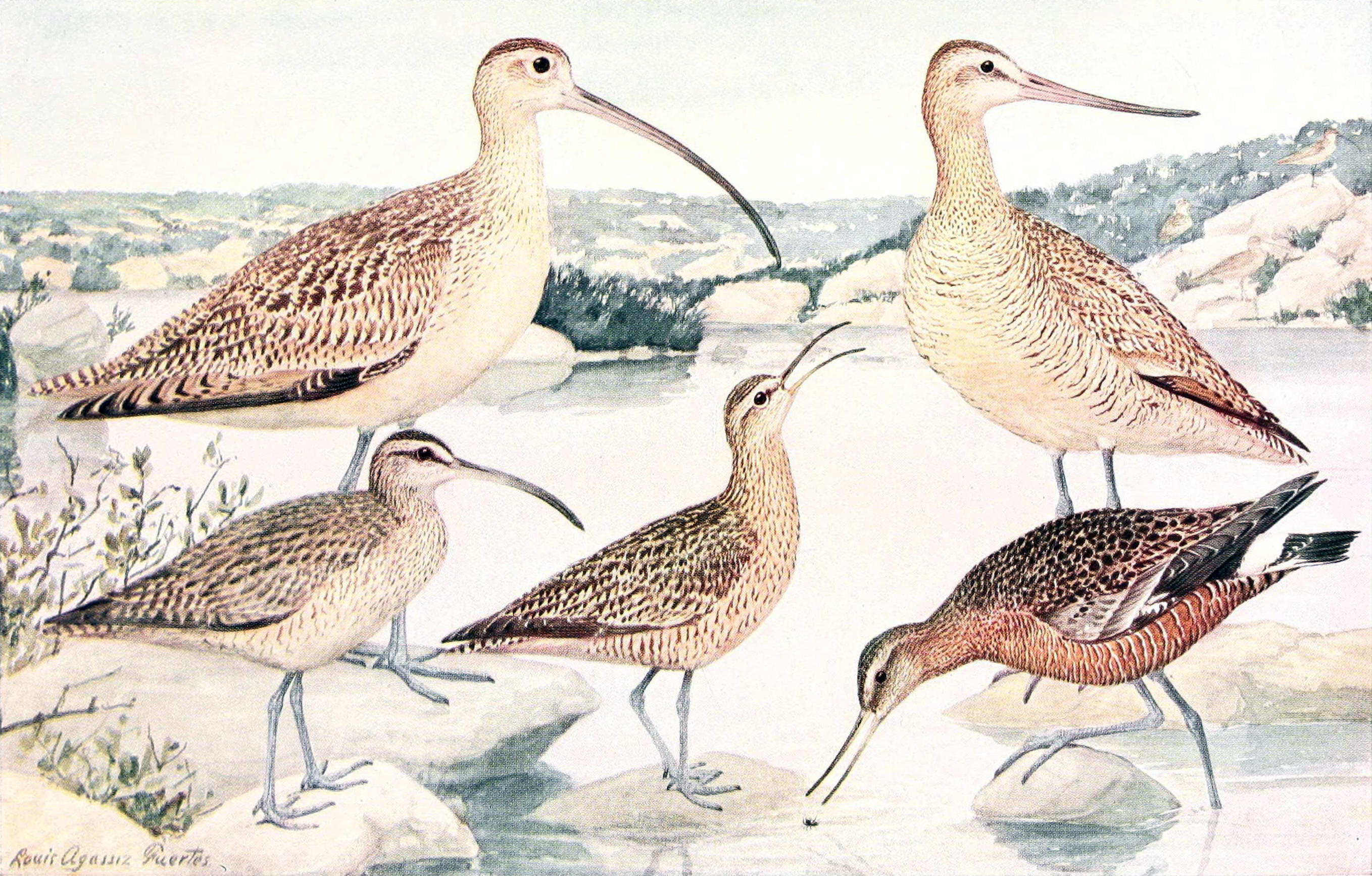
Illustration (middle) by Louis Agassiz Fuertes

The Eskimo curlew is one of eight species of curlew, classed with them in the genus Numenius. It has occasionally been placed in the separate genus Mesoscolopax. Numenius is classed in the family Scolopacidae. Other groups in that family include woodcocks, phalaropes, snipes, and sandpipers. Scolopacidae is a Charadriiform lineage.

The species was described by Johann Reinhold Forster in 1772. The generic name has three possible etymologies. One is that it comes from the Greek "noumenios". "Noumenios" means "of the new moon", the thin beak of curlews being compared to a thin crescent moon. A second possibility is that the genus name is derived from the word numen, meaning "nod", and referring to curlews' heads being bent forward and down. The final possibility is that Numenius is a Latinized form of the Greek noumenios, which was the word Diogenes Laërtius used to refer to a species of curlew. The specific name "borealis" is Latin for "northern".

This species has many common names. It has been named doe-bird or doughbird, fute, little curlew, and prairie pigeon. The first two names come from its fatness during early migration south.

== Description ==
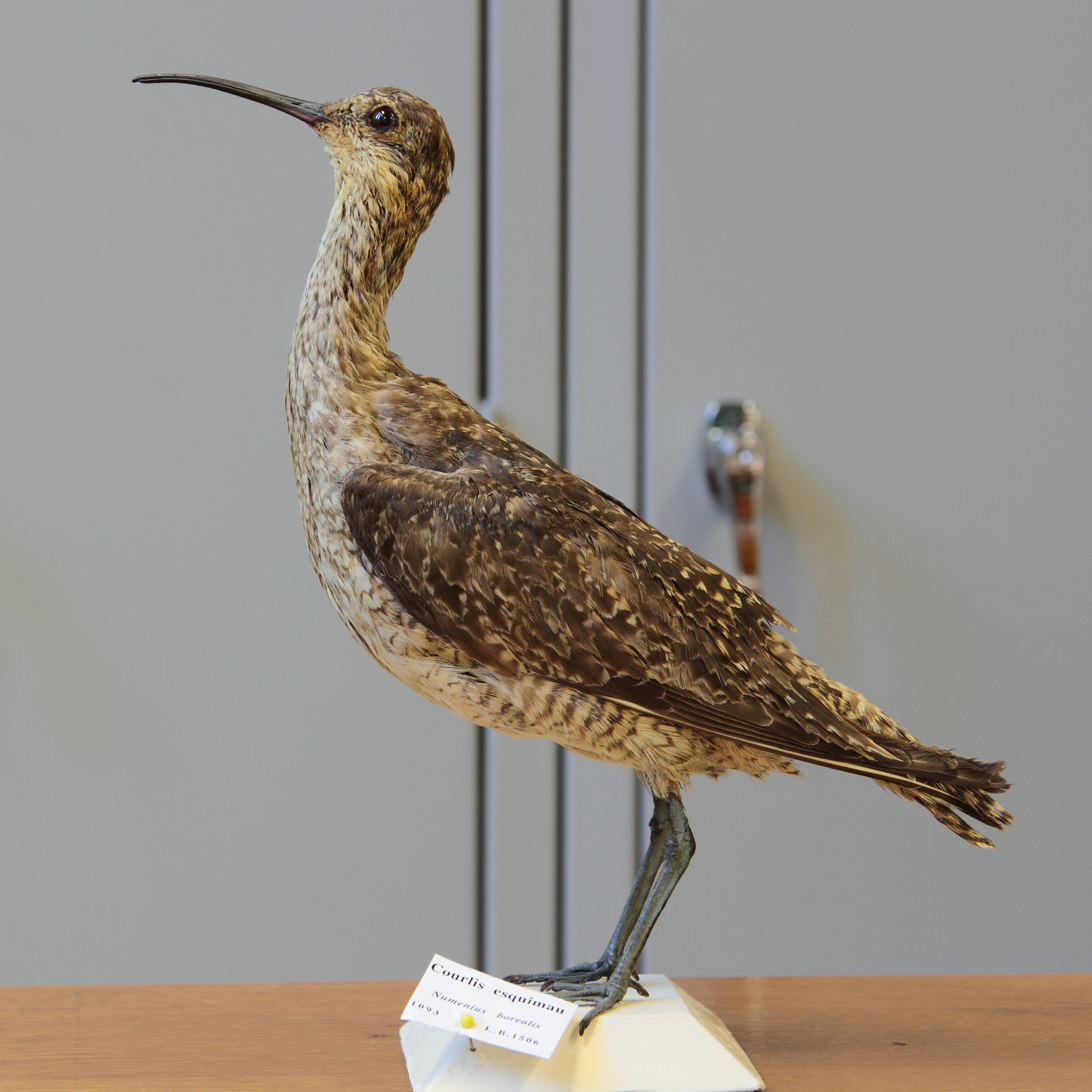
Specimen in Laval University Library

Eskimo curlews are small curlews, about 30 centimetres (12 in) in length, weighing approximately 360 g (13 oz), and having a wingspan of 70 cm (28 in). Adults have long dark greyish legs and a long bill curved slightly downward. The upperparts are mottled brown and the underparts are light brown. They show cinnamon wing linings in flight. They are similar in appearance to the Hudsonian whimbrel, but smaller in size.

In the field, the only certain way to distinguish the Eskimo curlew is confirmation of its unbarred undersides of the primaries. The call is poorly understood, but includes clear whistling sounds.

The Eskimo curlew forms a species pair with the Asian little curlew (Numenius minutus), but is slightly larger, longer-winged, shorter legged, and warmer in plumage tone than its Asian relative.

== Distribution and habitat ==
The Eskimo curlew is a New World bird. Members of this species bred on the tundra of western Arctic Canada and Alaska.

Eskimo curlews migrated to the Pampas of Argentina in the late summer and returned in February. They used to be very rare vagrants to western Europe, but there have been no recent records. In Britain, there are four records, all from the nineteenth century.

A comparison of dates and migratory patterns has led some to conjecture that Eskimo curlews and American golden plover are the shorebirds that attracted the attention of Christopher Columbus to nearby land after 65 days at sea and out of sight of land on his first voyage. In the 1800s, millions of Eskimo curlews followed migration routes from the present Yukon and Northwest Territories, flying east along the northern shore of Canada, then south over the Atlantic Ocean to South America in the winter. When returning to North America, they would fly north through the Great Plains.

== Ecology and behaviour ==
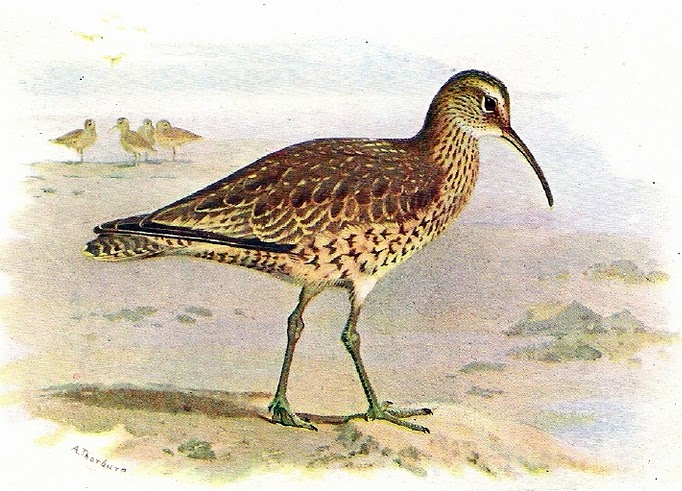
Eskimo curlew by Archibald Thorburn

=== Diet ===
Eskimo curlews pick up food by sight, and feed by probing. They eat mostly berries while on the fall migration in Canada. During the rest of their migration and on the breeding grounds, they eat insects. Snails and other invertebrates (including the extinct Rocky Mountain locust) also are part of their diet during migration.

=== Reproduction ===
Nesting probably occurs in June. Nests are in open areas on the ground and are difficult to find. They are made of wisps of dried grass or leaves. The eggs are green with brown splotches.

The specific incubation behaviour of this species is unknown. It is not certain which sex, if not both, incubates, nor what the specific timeline is. These birds evidently do not attack intruders approaching their nests, which provides reason to believe that their nests are far apart from each other.

== Probable extinction ==
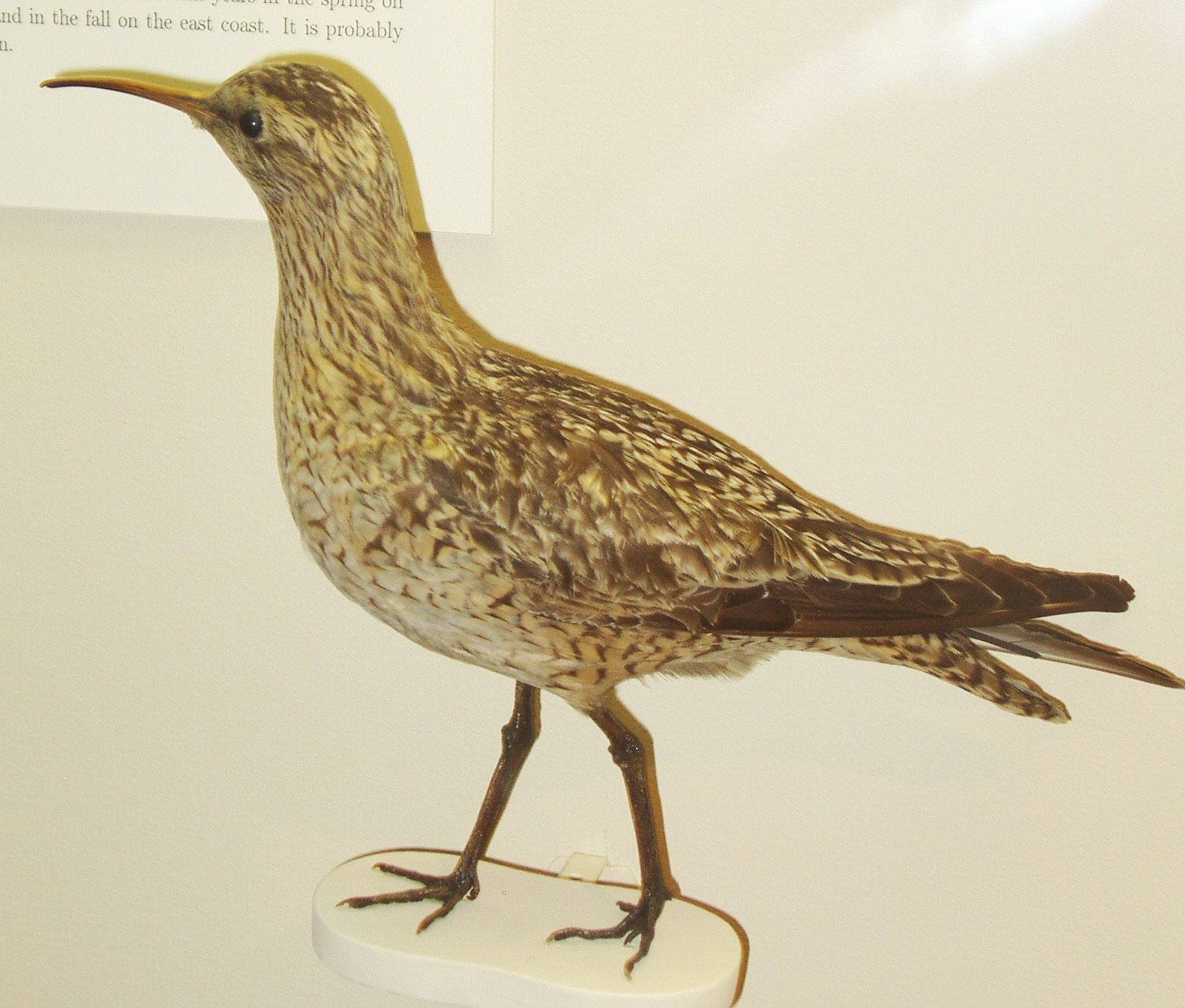
Specimen in the Museum of Comparative Zoology

At one time, the Eskimo curlew may have been one of the most numerous shorebirds in North America, with a population in the millions. With their meat considered a delicacy, as many as 2 million birds per year were killed near the end of the nineteenth century. The last confirmed sightings were in 1962 on Galveston Island, Texas (where it was photographed), and on Barbados in 1963 (where a specimen was collected). There was a reliable report of 23 birds in Texas in 1981, and a few dozen additional unconfirmed reports from scattered locales (the Northwest Territories, Texas, Ontario, Manitoba, Massachusetts, Alaska, Nova Scotia, Saskatchewan, Argentina, Guatemala, Labrador, New Jersey, and North Carolina) between 1964 and 2006. No confirmed record of this species has been reported in South America since 1939. It has been suggested that the species not be treated as extinct until all possible remaining habitats have been surveyed and incidental sightings have ceased, and an assessment of critically endangered (possibly extinct) be adopted in the meantime. Full details on all sightings up to 1986 are included in the online edition of Eskimo Curlew: A Vanishing Species?

This species is fully protected in Argentina, Brazil, Canada, Mexico, and the United States. Hunting has been outlawed since around 1916.

== In popular culture ==
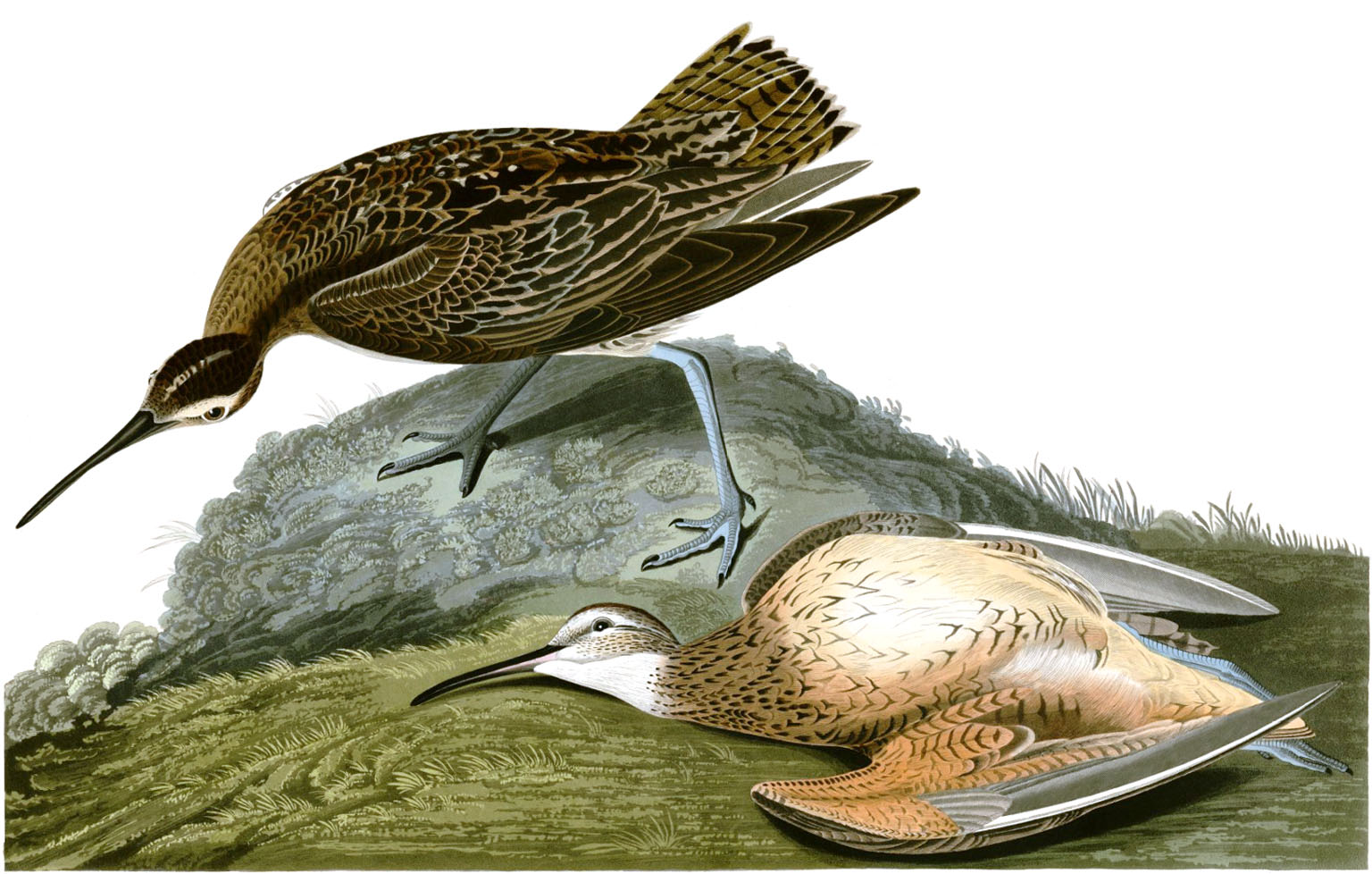
Illustration by John James Audubon

The plight of this bird inspired the novel (and subsequent Emmy Award-winning 1972 ABC Afterschool Special) Last of the Curlews.

The "Esquimaux Curlew" appears as plate CCCLVII of Audubon's Birds of America.

In Galveston, Texas there is a statue where the last confirmed sighting and photo was taken in 1962.
