= What Happened on September 11 =

2019 documentary television film

- Directed by: Amy Schatz
- Country of origin: United States
- Original language: English

Production
- Producer: Amy Schatz

Original release
- Network: HBO Family
- Release: September 11, 2019

What Happened on September 11 is an HBO Family documentary introducing the events of 9/11 to a young audience. Directed and produced by Amy Schatz, this half hour film features school children in conversation with survivors and family members, historical segments, and classroom scenes exploring 9/11 through artwork and poetry.

It was produced for HBO in collaboration with the 9/11 Tribute Museum.
