= Song of Parkland =

- Directed by: Amy Schatz
- Release date: 2019
- Country: United States
- Language: English

Song of Parkland is a short HBO Documentary film featuring the Marjory Stoneman Douglas High School drama students and their teacher, Melody Herzfeld. Filmed in the months following the shooting at their school, the half-hour documentary follows the students as they return to school and decide to continue with the musical they were working on at the time of the attack.

Directed and produced by Amy Schatz, the film includes performances, interviews, songs written by the students about their experience, and scenes from walk-outs and rallies across the country as other young people, inspired by the Parkland activists, take to the streets to call for an end to gun violence.

The short film was nominated for a Primetime Emmy Award for Outstanding Children's Program. In January 2020, Schatz won the Directors Guild of America Award for Children's Programs for "Song of Parkland".
