= Amy Schatz =

American director and producer

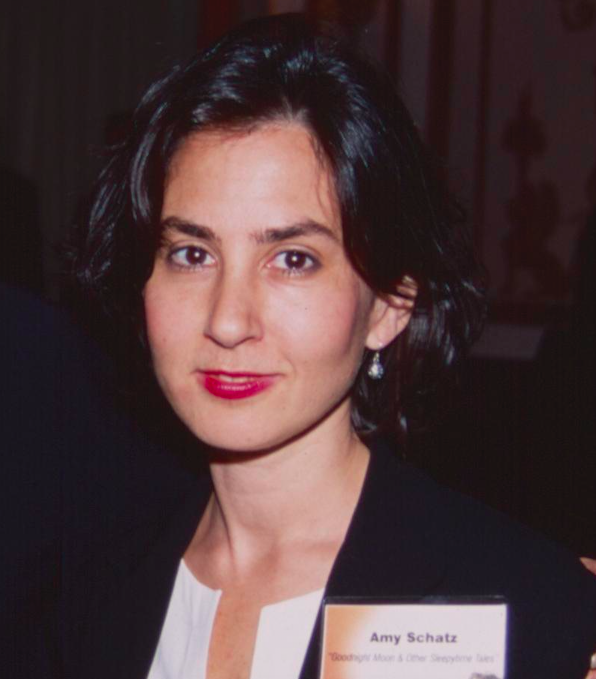
- Amy Schatz at the 59th Annual Peabody Awards
- Education: McGill University
- Occupations: Director, producer
- Notable work: Classical Baby, The Number on Great-Grandpa's Arm, "Song of Parkland"
- Website: Official website

Amy Schatz is an American director and producer of documentaries and children's shows and series. Schatz's work has earned eight Primetime Emmy Awards, eight Directors Guild of America Awards, and three Peabody Awards, among other awards and nominations.

== Early life and education ==
Schatz is a graduate of McGill University in Montreal.

== Career ==
Schatz's work includes The Runaway Bunny, an animated musical based on the classic children's book, and We Are the Dream: The Kids of the Oakland MLK Oratorical Fest. Schatz also created the Classical Baby series and Goodnight Moon & Other Sleepytime Tales, Song of Parkland, an HBO Documentary featuring the Marjory Stoneman Douglas High School drama students, In the Shadow of the Towers: Stuvyesant High on 9/11 and the children’s documentary, What Happened on September 11.

Additional HBO shows include The Number on Great-Grandpa's Arm, a short film for young people on The Holocaust, Saving My Tomorrow, a 6-part series on the environment produced with the American Museum of Natural History, An Apology to Elephants, a film with Lily Tomlin, A Child's Garden of Poetry, A Family is a Family is a Family: a Rosie O’Donnell Celebration, Don't Divorce Me! Kids' Rules for Parents on Divorce, 'Twas the Night, and others. For PBS, her credits include the Bill Moyers series, Moyers on Addiction, A World of Ideas and What Can We Do About Violence? Schatz also worked on the feature films George Balanchine's The Nutcracker and Meredith Monk's Books of Days.

== Awards and honors ==
Schatz's work has earned eight Primetime Emmy Awards, eight Directors Guild of America Awards, three Peabody Awards, a Parents' Choice Award, a Gracie Award, and five Animation Emmy Awards, among others. She is a member of the Directors Guild of America, Women in Film, and the Academy of Television Arts & Sciences.

Awards for Schatz's work
Year	Award	Category	Work	Result	Ref.
1995	Emmy Awards	Outstanding Children's Program	The World Wildlife Fund Presents "Going, Going, Al"	Winner	
1996	Peabody Awards		How Do You Spell God?	Winner	
1997	Emmy Awards	Outstanding Children's Program	How Do You Spell God?	Winner	
1999	Directors Guild of America Awards	Outstanding Directorial Achievement in Children's Programs	Goodnight Moon & Other Sleepy Time Tales	Winner	
1999	Emmy Awards	Outstanding Children's Program	Rosie O'Donnell's Kids Are Punny	Nominee	
1999	Peabody Awards		Goodnight Moon & Other Sleepytime Tales	Winner	
2000	Emmy Awards	Outstanding Children's Program	Goodnight Moon And Other Sleepytime Tales	Winner	
2001	Directors Guild of America Awards	Outstanding Directorial Achievement in Children's Programs	'Twas the Night	Winner	
2002	Directors Guild of America Awards	Outstanding Directorial Achievement in Children's Programs	Through a Child's Eyes: September 11, 2001	Nominee	
2003	Emmy Awards	Outstanding Children's Program	Through a Child's Eyes: September 11, 2001	Winner	
2005	Emmy Awards	Outstanding Children's Program	Classical Baby	Winner	
2006	Emmy Awards	Outstanding Children's Program	Classical Baby 2	Nominee	
2006	Peabody Awards		The Music in Me	Winner	
2008	Directors Guild of America Awards	Outstanding Directorial Achievement in Children's Programs	Classical Baby (I'm Grown Up Now), "The Poetry Show"	Winner	
2008	Emmy Awards	Outstanding Children's Program	Classical Baby (I'm Grown Up Now): The Poetry Show	Winner	
2009	Directors Guild of America Awards	Outstanding Directorial Achievement in Children's Programs	Hard Times for an An American Girl: The Great Depression	Nominee	
2011	Directors Guild of America Awards	Outstanding Directorial Achievement in Children's Programs	A Child's Garden of Poetry	Winner	
2011	Emmy Awards	Outstanding Children's Program	A Child's Garden of Poetry	Winner	
2012	Directors Guild of America Awards	Outstanding Directorial Achievement in Children's Programs	Don't Divorce Me! Kids' Rules for Parents on Divorce	Nominee	
2013	Directors Guild of America Awards	Outstanding Directorial Achievement in Children's Programs	An Apology to Elephants	Winner	
2014	Directors Guild of America Awards	Outstanding Directorial Achievement in Children's Programs	Saving My Tomorrow, "Part 1 and 2"	Nominee	
2015	Directors Guild of America Awards	Outstanding Directorial Achievement in Children's Programs	Saving My Tomorrow, "Part 3"	Nominee	
2019	Directors Guild of America Awards	Outstanding Directorial Achievement in Children's Programs	Song of Parkland	Winner	
2019	Emmy Awards	Outstanding Children's Program	Song of Parkland	Nomnee	
2020	Directors Guild of America Awards	Outstanding Directorial Achievement in Children's Programs	We Are the Dream	Winner	
2020	Emmy Awards	Outstanding Children's Program	We Are the Dream	Winner	
2023	Directors Guild of America Awards	Outstanding Directorial Achievement in Children's Programs	Stand Up & Shout: Songs From a Philly High School	Winner	
2024	Children and Family Emmy Awards	Outstanding Non-Fiction Program	Stand Up & Shout: Songs From a Philly High School	Winner	

== Personal life ==
Schatz lives in New York City with her husband, Max Rudin, and their two children.
