= Fred Bodsworth =

Canadian writer

Charles Frederick Bodsworth
- Born: October 11, 1918; Port Burwell, Ontario, Canada
- Died: September 15, 2012 (aged 93); Scarborough General Hospital, Toronto, Ontario, Canada
- Occupations: Writer; Journalist; Naturalist
- Known for: Writing Last of the Curlews

Charles Frederick "Fred" Bodsworth (October 11, 1918 – September 15, 2012) was a Canadian writer, journalist and amateur naturalist.

Born in Port Burwell, Ontario, Bodsworth worked as a journalist for the St. Thomas Times-Journal, The Toronto Star, and Maclean's, where he also served as assistant editor. From 1964 to 1967, he was president of the Federation of Ontario Naturalists. Bodsworth received the Matt Cohen Prize in 2002 for his writing. He died at Scarborough General Hospital in Toronto.

Bodsworth was predeceased by his wife Margaret Banner.

The Port Burwell branch of the Elgin County Library was renamed in his honour in 2005.

== Bibliography ==
- Last of the Curlews (1955) ISBN 0-7710-9874-X, ISBN 1-887178-25-2
- The Strange One (1959)
- The Atonement of Ashley Morden (1964)
- The Sparrow's Fall (1967)
- Pacific Coast (1970)
