= Last of the Curlews =

1955 novel by Fred Bodsworth

- First edition
- Author: Fred Bodsworth
- Illustrator: T. M. Shortt
- Language: English
- Publisher: Dodd Mead
- Publication date: 1955
- Publication place: Canada
- Media type: Print (hard and paperback)

Last of the Curlews is a novel, a fictionalized account of the life of the last Eskimo curlew. It was written by Fred Bodsworth, a Canadian newspaper reporter and naturalist, and published in 1955.

== Plot introduction ==
The story follows the bird throughout a year during its migration to South America and return to the Canadian Arctic in search of a mate. Although somewhat anthropomorphic in parts, the book paints a realistic and detailed picture of this bird's life and behaviour.

The book may have been somewhat premature in that there were confirmed sightings of this bird in 1963 and there were a number of unconfirmed sightings after that date. However, this bird may now be extinct.

== Television adaptation ==
The book was made into an animated film by Hanna-Barbera Productions. The English original version was narrated by Ross Martin, who became famous as the Artemus Gordon character in the original version of The Wild Wild West. This film was first shown on October 4, 1972 as the first ABC Afterschool Special. It was given an Emmy for Outstanding Achievement in Children's Programming in 1973.

== Editions ==
The 1988 edition (ISBN 1-887178-25-2) includes a foreword by the Pulitzer Prize winning poet W.S. Merwin and an afterword by the Nobel Laureate physicist Murray Gell-Mann.
