= Still Life with Ham (Philippe Rousseau) =

Painting by Philippe Rousseau

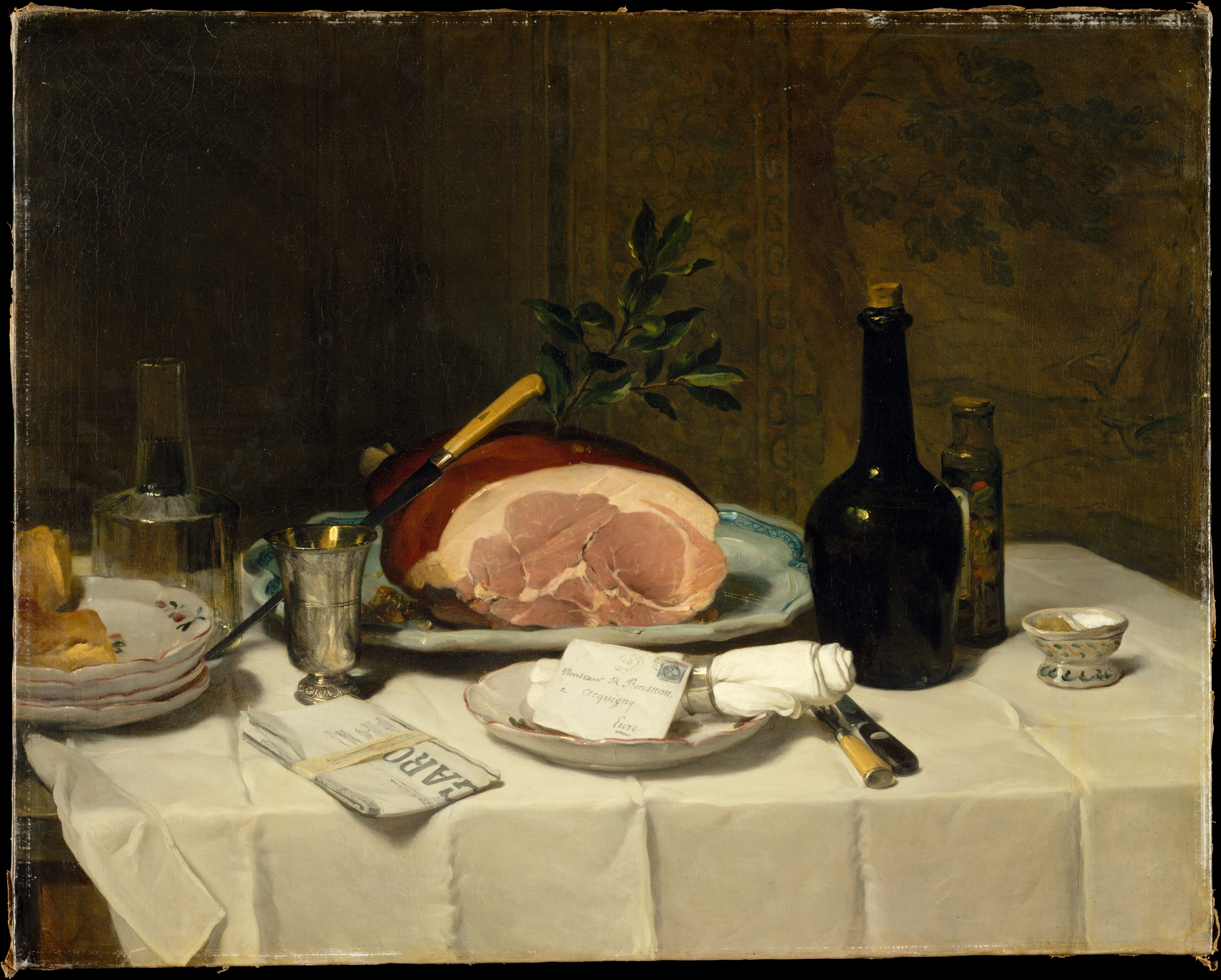
- Artist: Philippe Rousseau
- Year: c. 1870s
- Medium: Oil on canvas
- Dimensions: 73 cm × 92.1 cm (29 in × 36.3 in)
- Location: Metropolitan Museum of Art; New York City

Still Life with Ham is a 1870s still life painting by French artist Philippe Rousseau. Done in oil on canvas, the painting depicts a number of items set on a table. The work is currently in the collection of the Metropolitan Museum of Art.

== Description ==
The painting is intricately and intimately detailed; not only did Rousseau render a ham (described as "succulent" by one source) and a fully set table, he also included an issue of Le Figaro (a prominent French newspaper) addressed to his home. The work is highly contemporaneous to the early 1870s.
