= Frank Pace (TV producer) =

American television producer (born 1950)

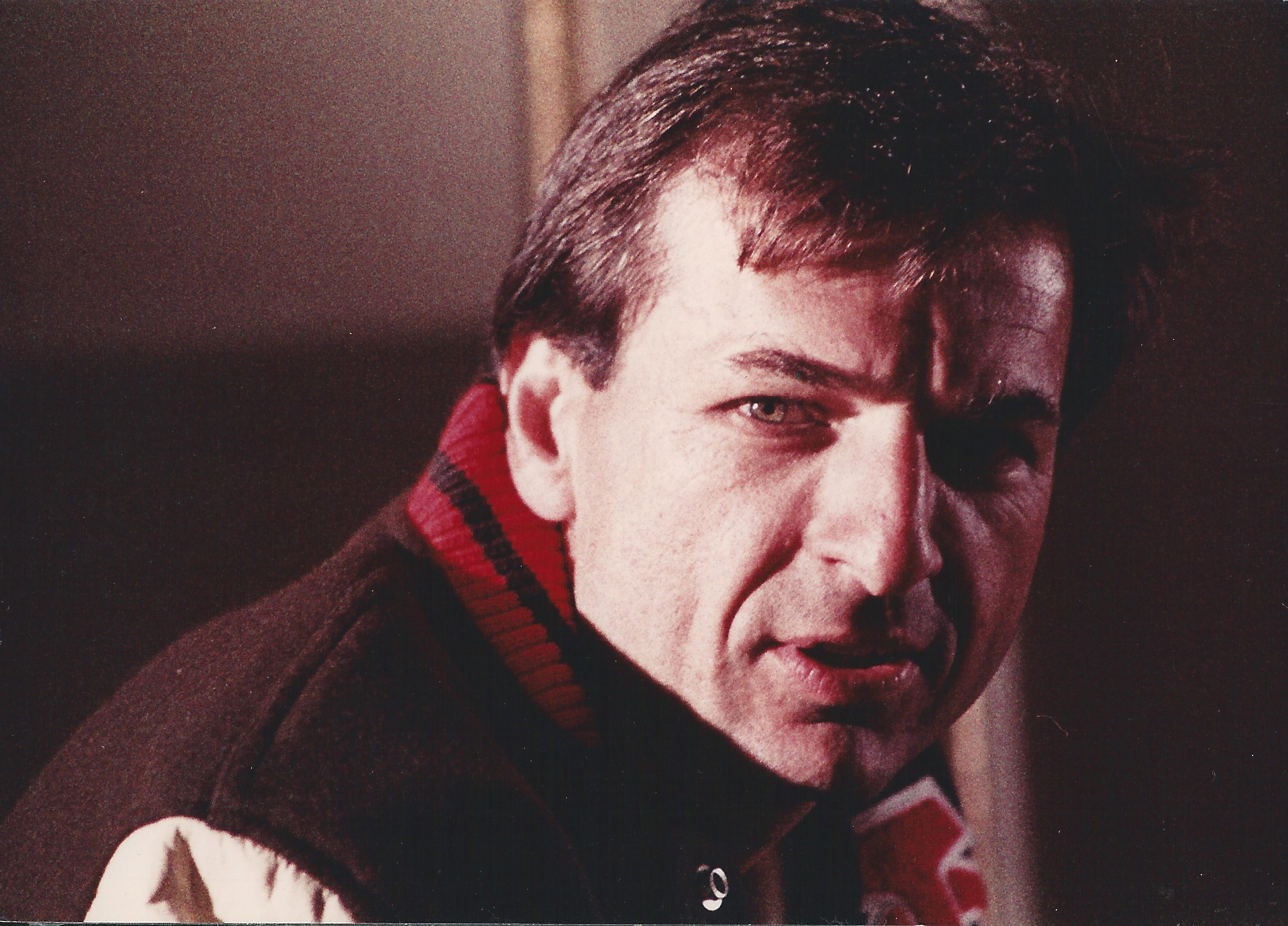
Frank Pace

Frank Pace (born February 14, 1950) is an American television producer and writer.

== Background and personal life ==
Pace was born in White Plains, New York, the son of Rose and Dominick Pace. Frank has two brothers, Bruce and Douglas. Pace graduated from Valhalla High School and went on to attain a BS degree in business from Jacksonville University, where he served on the University Board of Trustees (2006–2016). Pace lives in Pasadena, California, with his wife Karen (Huggins). They have one daughter, Erin.

== Career ==
=== Television ===
Pace has more than 700 episodes of network television to his credit. He has produced 16 television pilots, of which 12 were ordered as series and five were sold into syndication. His Warner Brother TV credits include George Lopez, Suddenly Susan, For Your Love, Murphy Brown and Head of the Class. He also served as Co-Executive Producer on the TV Series, Shake it Up! and Co-Executive Producer on Girl Meets World, for which he was nominated for an Emmy in 2014, 2015 and 2016. Previously, Pace received an Emmy nomination for "Outstanding Comedy Series" (Murphy Brown), in 1988. Pace also produced the NBC movie Babe Ruth (1991) starring Stephen Lang, the HBO Live Special George Lopez – America's Mexican, and the Warner Brothers Premier feature film, Mr. Troop Mom, as well as the movie Shake It Up: Made in Japan. In 2017, he produced the documentary Jacksonville WHO? which starred Emmy award winner Jay Thomas and NBA Hall of Famer Artis Gilmore. In 2018 to 2019 he produced the revival of Murphy Brown on CBS. He is currently a Production Executive at Warner Bros TV. He also is the Executive Producer and co-host of the weekly video podcast, A Mic, a Mook and a Mic with Billy O’Connor. And is a member of Directors Guild of America and Academy of Television Arts & Sciences.

=== Advertising ===
Pace spent eight years as Vice President of The Phillips Organisation, Ltd, a San Diego–based marketing and public relations firm. At TPO, Pace supervised a young Armen Keteyian, who today is Chief Investigative Reporter for CBS News. Their collaboration on a variety of projects has continued for more than 30 years. At TPO, Pace and Keteyian were credited with creating the blueprint for short-course triathlon racing on behalf of Carl Thomas, their client at Speedo SportsWear. Their 1.5 kilometer swim, 40 km bike and 10 km run event is now a full-fledged Olympic Sport. A meeting in the spring of 1979 with Bill Rasmussen, founder of ESPN prior to that network's launching, set in motion Pace's transition from advertising to television.

=== Sports ===
Pace began his career in the now-defunct World Football League (WFL) on the staffs of the Southern California Sun, the Portland Storm and the Chicago Winds. Pace serves as advisor to baseball Hall of Famer Rod Carew and Basketball Hall of Famer Artis Gilmore. He has coached high school soccer in Southern California for Flintridge Sacred Heart Academy in La Canada Flintridge for 15 seasons. He coached the team to California CIF Championships in 2010 and 2011, and they went undefeated from December 2009 to January 2011. In 2011 he led the team to a No. 1 National Ranking. He was elected to the school Hall of Fame in 2014.

=== Writing ===
Pace and Billy O’Connor have written three books, all published by Acclaim Press: If These Lips Could Talk, Lamar’s Gamble- A Tale of the AFL/NFL Merger and Combustible. In 2012, Pace Co-Authored Rod Carew's Hit To Win with Rod Carew and Armen Keteyian. He had previously co-authored Rod Carew's Art and Science of Hitting along with Keteyian and Carew in 1986. He has also been published in Sports Illustrated, Emmy Magazine, The Florida Times Union, The Los Angeles Times, Soccer Journal and Hall of Fame Magazine.

Pace was the credited writer (and producer) on eight segments of Inside the NFL (the George Lopez segments) and an episode of George Lopez entitled The Unnatural.
