= Philippe Rousseau =

French painter (1816–1887)

Philippe Francois Rousseau
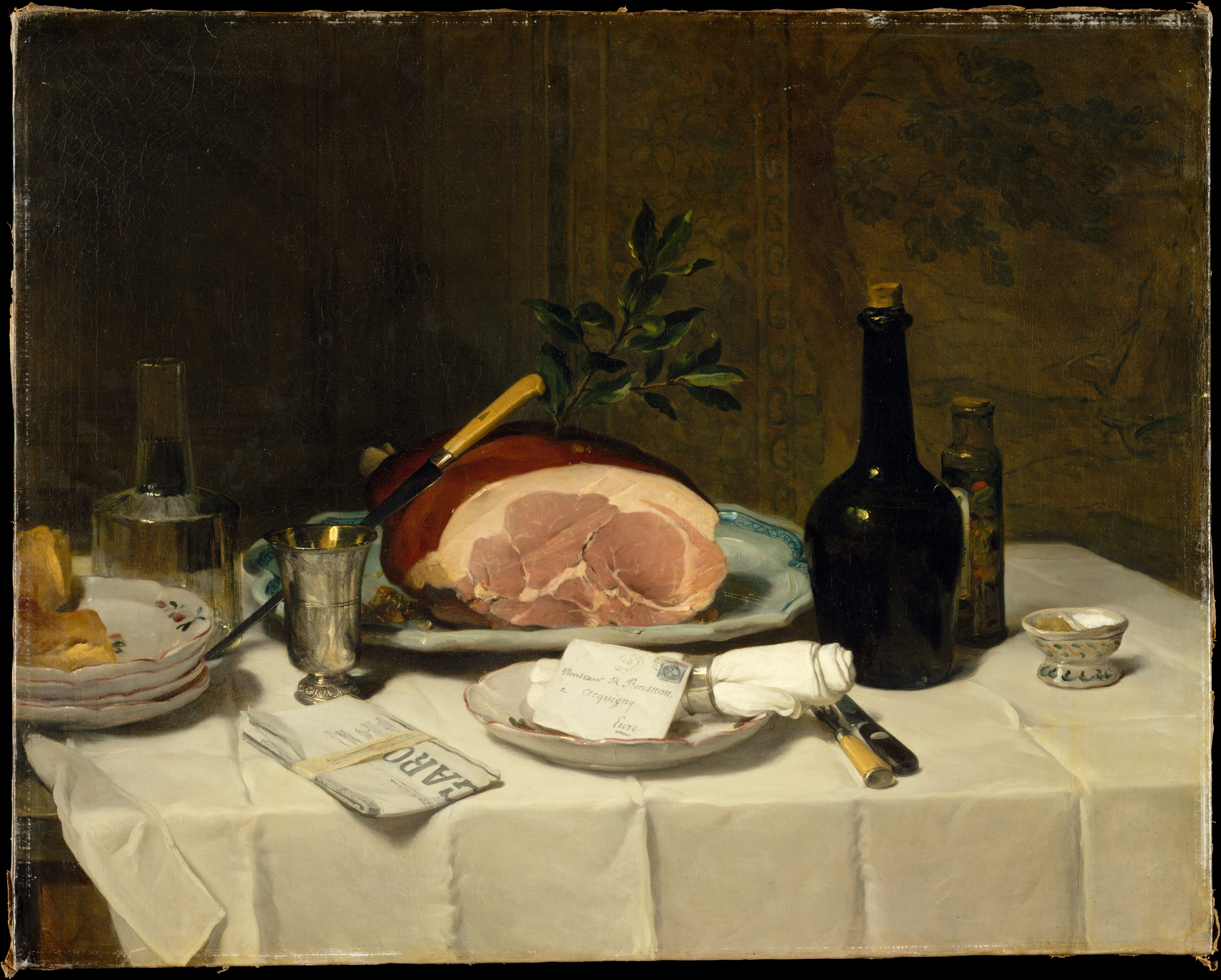
- Rousseau still life
- Born: 23 February 1816; Paris, France
- Died: 5 December 1887 (aged 71); Acquigny, France
- Education: École des Beaux-Arts
- Known for: Still life painting

Philippe Francois Rousseau (23 February 1816, Paris – 5 December 1887, Acquigny) was a French painter known primarily for his still life paintings.

== Biography ==
He was a pupil of Baron Antoine-Jean Gros and Jean-Victor Bertin at the École des Beaux-Arts in Paris. He began his career as a landscape painter, but later concentrated on still life and animal subjects.

He exhibited at the Paris Salon from 1834, earning a third class medal in 1845, a second class medal in 1855, and a first class medal in 1848.

Rousseau was made a knight of the Legion of Honor in 1852, and promoted to officer in 1870.

== Artwork in public collections ==
- Le Singe aquafortiste, Magnin Museum, Dijon, France
- 1867 : Chardin et ses modèles, Orsay Museum, Paris
- Still life : Nature morte: gibier et panier, Orsay Museum, Paris
- Still life : Nature morte: gibier et plat d'orfèvrerie, Orsay Museum, Paris
- The Fish Market, The National Gallery, London
- Still life with Oysters, The National Gallery, London
- 1869 : The Heron's Pool, Bowes Museum, County Durham, England
- 1870s : Still Life with Ham, Metropolitan Museum of Art

== Exhibited artwork ==
- 1834 : Vue prise en Normandie.
- 1835 : Vue prise à Dampierre près Versailles; Vue prise à Saint-Martin près Gisors.
- 1836 : Vue prise à Freleuse près Gisors.
- 1837 : Vue prise à Lions en Normandie; Vue prise du télégraphe sur la côte Sainte-Catherine, à Rouen; Vue prise à Dampierre.
- 1838 : Vue prise aux environs de Surgère (Charente-Maritime).
- 1839 : Paysage.
- 1841 : La Chaise de poste, paysage.
- 1843 : 3 Still life
- 1845 : Le Rat des villes et le rat des champs; Un Chien; Fruits; Still life.
- 1846 : Le Chien et le vieux rat; Still life.
- 1847 : La Taupe et le lapin; Intérieurs; Fleurs et papillons.
- 1848 : Une Basse-cour; Fruits, Natures mortes, gibier .
- 1849 : Le Chat prenant une souris; Un Intérieur de ferme.
- 1850 : Still life; Fruits; Part à deux ! Still life; Un Importun.
- 1852 : Le Rat retiré du monde; Still life; Basse-cour.
- 1853 : Pugargue chassant au marais; La Mère de famille; Still life.
- 1855 : Chevreau broutant des fleurs; Cigogne faisant la sieste au bord d'un bassin; Deux Artistes de chez Guignol; 2 Still life.
- 1857 : Chiens couplés au chenil; Intérieurs, gibier et légume; Lièvre chassé par des bassets; Résignation, impatience; Intérieur de ferme en Savoie; La Récréation; Perroquets; Pigeons; le Déjeuner.
- 1859 : Un Jour de gala; Un Déjeuner.
- 1861 : Musique de chambre; Cuisine.
- 1863 : La Recherche de l'absolu; Le Lièvre et les grenouilles.
- 1864 : Un Marché d'autrefois; Still life.
- 1865 : Chacun pour soi; Fruits.
- 1866 : Il opère lui-même; Fleurs d'automne.
- 1867 : Chardin et ses modèles; Portrait de chien.
- 1868 : Résidence de Walter Scott; Fleurs d'été.
- 1869 : L'Été, ou l'ombrelle bleue; L'Automne.
- 1870 : La Fontaine fleurie; Premières prunes et dernières cerises
- 1872 : Les Confitures; Le Printemps.
- 1873 : L'office.
- 1874 : La Fête-Dieu; La Salade.
- 1875 : Le Loup et l'agneau; Les Fromages.
- 1876 : Les Huîtres; Les Pavots.
- 1877 : Le Déjeuner; Ô ma tendre musette.
- 1878 : Les Roses; Le Lunch.
- 1879 : Les Tulipes.
- 1889 : Le Rapport; Basse-cour.
- 1881 : Huîtres.
- 1882 : Les deux Amis; Les Fromages.

== Gallery ==
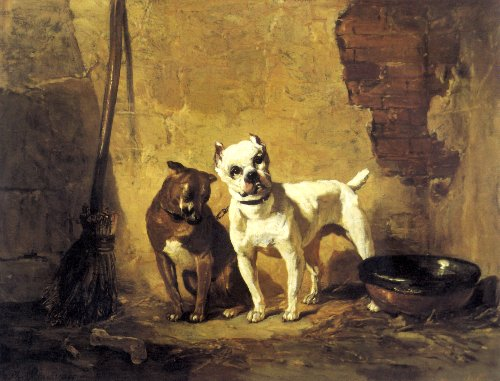
Best Of Friends - Bulldog & Bull Terrier

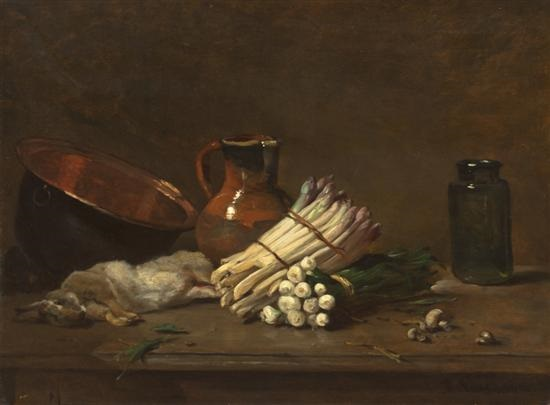
Still life with bunches of white asparagus

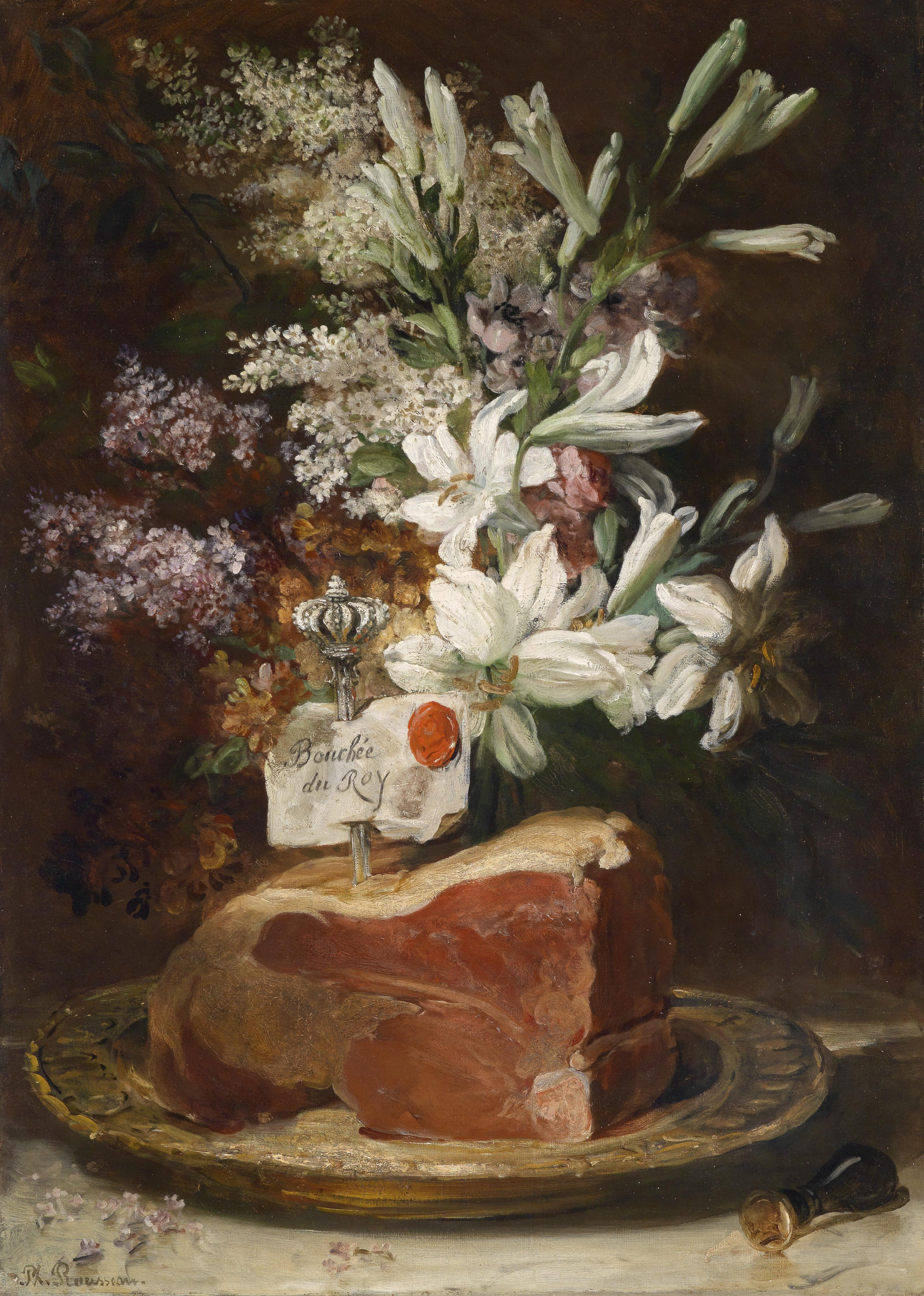
La Bouchee du Roy

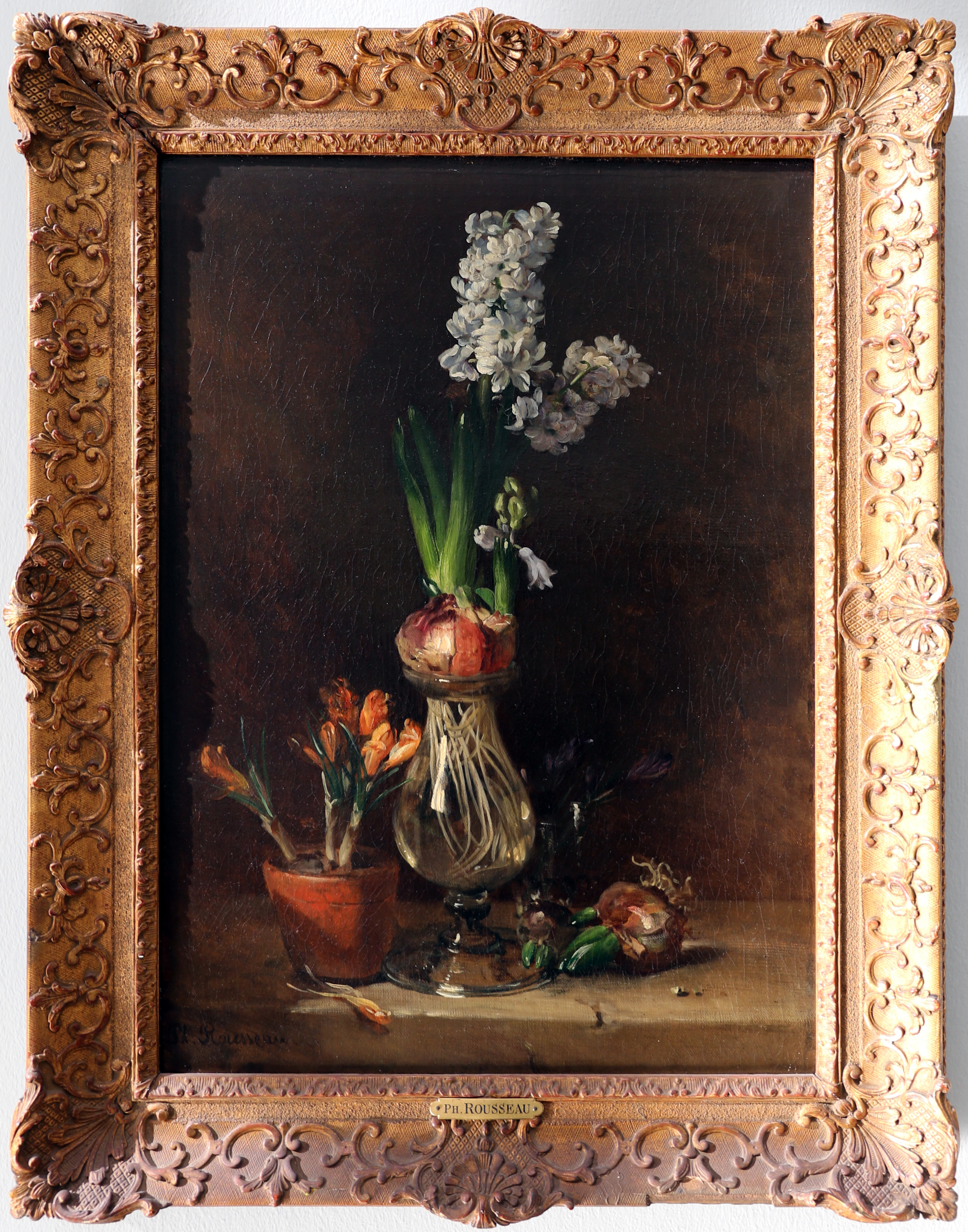
Natura morta con giacinti
