= Ricki Franklin =

American television producer

Ricki Franklin is an American television producer. She was KCET Director of Cultural Programs for the Public Broadcasting System network (PBS). She has been nominated for numerous Emmy Awards, and produced American Playhouse.
