= David Connell (television producer) =

American television producer

David Connell (1931 – May 5, 1995) was the original executive producer for Sesame Street, and Children's Television Workshop's vice-president in charge of production. Connell, who had been a producer for the CBS children's program Captain Kangaroo, played a key role in establishing the basic format of the "street" skits. He was also the principal creative behind The Man from Alphabet, a series of live action skits starring Gary Owens which failed in child tests and were never aired on Sesame Street. Connell received his B.A. in 1955 and his M.A. in 1956, both from the University of Michigan.

== Credits ==
His credits include:

- 1969-1973: Sesame Street—executive producer
- 1974: Out to Lunch—executive producer
- 1975: The Jean Marsh Cartoon Special with Grover—producer
- 1987: Sesame Street Live Big Bird and the ABC's—co-writer

Connell was also executive producer and writer for The Electric Company, which he helped create in 1971, and for Square One TV in the late 1980s. He won five Emmy Awards and received an additional 20 nominations. He also served as executive producer of the Emmy Award-winning special, based on the C.S. Lewis book, The Lion, the Witch and the Wardrobe, which was broadcast on CBS in 1979.
