= Don't Eat the Pictures =

One-hour Sesame Street special

- Cover of VHS release
- Country of origin: United States
- Original language: English

Original release
- Network: PBS
- Release: November 16, 1983

Don't Eat the Pictures: Sesame Street at the Metropolitan Museum of Art (or simply Don't Eat the Pictures) is a one-hour Sesame Street special that aired on PBS on November 16, 1983. The title comes from a song in the special, "Don't Eat the Pictures", sung by Cookie Monster. It was available as a video tape by Random House in 1987, and it was re-released on VHS by Sony Wonder in 1996 and on DVD in 2011. It has everybody reprising their roles from the children's television series, Sesame Street. The story takes on them getting locked in the Metropolitan Museum of Art overnight as they embark on an adventure to find their friend, Big Bird, who has gotten lost looking for Snuffy. They must stay there until the morning while avoiding a night watchman. The special features the regular human cast of Sesame Street along with several Muppet characters, including Cookie Monster, Telly, Bert & Ernie, The Count, Grover and Oscar the Grouch. Snuffy also appears, even though his names are revealed to be Mr. Snuffleupagus and Aloysius Snuffleupagus, however, at this point in the show's history, he is still Big Bird's imaginary friend, never seen by the other characters on Sesame Street.

== Plot ==
The Sesame Street gang have gone on a field trip to the Metropolitan Museum of Art. Big Bird has arranged to meet with Snuffy there but before he can, it is closing time. He decides to go off and look for Snuffy. Before the group can leave, they realize he is missing and run all through the museum looking for him. The chase has them going through different exhibits at high speed and missing, spotting, and chasing him. After a bit, they give up, only to find that they are locked in the museum overnight. They decide to go back out and look for Big Bird and look at all the exhibits while they are at it.

Big Bird eventually finds Snuffy and they wander the Egyptian exhibit and encounter the ghost of an Egyptian prince named Sahu (Aram Chowdhury) and his cat who have been cursed to remain on Earth until he answers the question "Where does today meet yesterday?" Through drawings, he explains his dilemma. A demon appears to ask him the question. If he does not know or answers incorrectly, the demon vanishes until the next night. If he answers correctly, he will then be taken to Osiris, who shall weigh his heart against a feather. If it is lighter, then he can rejoin his parents among the stars, but if it is heavier he will remain on Earth forever. Big Bird considers all this too daunting and instead suggests he remain on Earth and become "the only 4,000-year-old kid on Sesame Street". However, Snuffy thinks it is only fair they help him be reunited with his parents and Big Bird agrees they should work on the question.

Meanwhile, the group has split up and are all in different exhibits. Bob and Cookie Monster find themselves looking at pictures with food in them. While Cookie Monster tries to eat them, Bob points out a museum's policy sign that says, "Please Don't Eat The Pictures". He replies with, "Oh, this going to be a long night." He later sings the song about this. Oscar finds an exhibit of Greek and Roman statues that have been broken by natural disasters. He looks in and breaks into a song on how beautiful they are to him. Grover finds an exhibit filled with armor from medieval times and thinks a suit of Maximilian armour is a guy named "Max" and tries to befriend him by changing into his Super Grover costume and singing a song. Ernie and Bert view Washington Crossing the Delaware, to which Bert comments on the dedication of Washington and his men, but Ernie comments on how he was very silly to cross in the winter and should have waited until Easter or taken the George Washington Bridge.

As the night passes, Big Bird and Snuffy continue to try to figure out the answer to the question. Soon, just before midnight, Big Bird unknowingly figures out the answer is "a museum". When the demon appears that night, the question is answered correctly and Sahu is sent to Osiris (Fritz Weaver) to have his heart weighed. When the feather to weigh it doesn't appear, Big Bird offers one of his to help. But when Sahu's heart is too heavy, Big Bird claims that it wasn't fair since he has been on Earth for 40 centuries.

After this, Sahu's heart becomes lighter and he is now ready to join his parents and take his cat. Big Bird and Snuffy then look up into the night sky through a glass window, and see four stars in a straight line (representing Sahu, his parents and cat), and are glad that they reunited him with his parents. When morning comes, Big Bird finds the group and Snuffy is not there. He got up early and left to get to "Snufflegarden", much to the group’s frustration. Bob commends Cookie Monster for behaving himself inside the museum and rewards him by saying he can have anything for sale on a hot dog cart. He, in a fit of hunger and gladness, elects to eat everything, even the cart itself.

After the closing credits, Big Bird pretends to be a statue. He encourages the viewers to visit their local museum and comments on how staying perfectly still is tiring and wonders how statues can do it.

== Songs ==
- "Broken and Beautiful" — sung by Oscar when he sees art pieces that are broken, or beautiful (Caroll Spinney)
- "I Want to be Your Friend" — sung by Grover's alter ego, "Super Grover" while making friends at the museum (Frank Oz)
- "Don't Eat the Pictures" — sung by Cookie Monster. In the end, he loves to devour something else if possible (Oz). Also sung by three angel monsters (Ivy Austin).
- "You're Gonna Be a Star" — sung by Big Bird when he asks his friend to be a star (Spinney). Also sung by his friend, Sahu (Aram Chowdhury).
- "Mothers and Children" — sung by Olivia when she learns all about mothers and their little children (Alaina Reed Hall)

The title song begins with Cookie Monster and his human friend, Bob McGrath in front of Still Life with Ham by Philippe Rousseau which Cookie Monster tries to eat. Bob holds him back and reminds him that he promised not to eat anything in the museum. Then he breaks into song, with angelic choral accompaniment, about paintings, statues, and mummies, and how he understands how important it is to not eat them.

== Cast ==
=== Muppet performers ===
- Caroll Spinney as Big Bird and Oscar the Grouch
- Frank Oz as Cookie Monster, Bert and Grover
- Jerry Nelson as The Count
- Martin P. Robinson as Snuffy
- Bryant Young as Snuffy (assistant)
- Jim Henson as Ernie
- Brian Muehl as Telly
- Richard Hunt
- Ivy Austin as Angels

=== Humans ===
- Linda Bove as Linda
- Northern Calloway as David
- Loretta Long as Susan
- Sonia Manzano as Maria
- Bob McGrath as Bob
- Roscoe Orman as Gordon
- Alaina Reed Hall as Olivia
- Aram Chowdhury as Sahu
- James Mason as Demon
- Fritz Weaver as Osiris
- Paul Dooley as Night Watchman
- Li Alexander
- Jason Paul Janzer
- Nadia Jones
- Mika Kakizaki
- David Zetlin-Jones
- Andrew Cassese
- Jon Stone as Intercom Announcer
- Caroline Kennedy (uncredited)

== Crew ==
- Conceived and Written by: Tony Geiss
- Produced by: Lisa Simon, Arlene Sherman, Tony Geiss
- Music by: Joe Raposo, Tony Geiss, Stephen J. Lawrence, Christopher Cerf, Dick Lieb
- Arranger and Conductor: Dick Lieb
- Music Coordinator: Danny Epstein
- Music Assistant: Dave Connor
- Production Supervisor: Frieda Lipp
- Associate Directors: Robert J. Emerick, Ted May
- 2nd Unit Director: Emily Squires
- Art Director: Victor DiNapoli
- Lighting Directors: David M. Clark, Jim Tetlow
- Muppets by: Caroly Wilcox, Kermit Love, Donald Sahlin with Ed Christie, Cheryl Blalock, Richard Termine, Noel MacNeal
- Production Stage Manager: Chet O'Brien
- Stage Manager: Niles Goodsite
- Set Decorator: Nat Mongioi
- Graphic Artist: Gerri Brioso
- Costume Designer: Bill Kellard
- Assistant to the Producers: Cheryl Ann Jung
- Production Assistants: Diane Mitchell, Mercedes Polanco, Thelma Moses, Danette Morganelli, Lynn Roberge, Stuart Lowery, Richard Grigonis
- Make-Up: Lee Halls
- Hairstylist: Karen Specht
- Wardrobe: Grisha Mynova
- Technical Director: Ralph Mensch
- Audio: Blake Norton
- Cameramen: Miguel Armstrong, Manny Gutierrez
- Video: Bob Haight
- Mobile Facilities Provided by: Reeves Teletape
- Videotape Editor: Matty Powers
- Sound Effects: Dick Maitland
- Engineer In Charge: Mark Schubin
- Executive Producer: Jim and Jane Henson, Joan Ganz Cooney, Lloyd Morrisett, Dulcy Singer
- Directed by: Jon Stone
- For the Metropolitan Museum of Art
  - The Office of Film & Television: Karl Katz
  - Production Coordinator: Caroline Kennedy
  - With Special Thanks To: Philippe de Montebello · And To The Departments Of: American Art, Ancient Near Eastern Art, Arms & Armor, Buildings, Egyptian Art, European Paintings, European Sculpture & Decorative Arts, Far Eastern Art, Greek & Roman Art, Information Desk, Operations, Public Information, Primitive Art, Photograph & Slide Library, Photograph Studio, Security, Twentieth Century Art · Richard Morsches, Linda Sylling, Joseph Volpato, Al, Siciliano, Hiram Pabon, Tom Gaffney, & The Entire Staff Of The Metropolitan Museum Of Art · And To: Dr. William Gutsch - American Museum Of National History - Hayden Planetarium

== See also ==
- List of American films of 1983
