= Dulcy Singer =

American television producer (1933–2026)

- Born: November 21, 1933
- Died: November 3, 2026 (aged 92)
- Occupation: Television executive producer
- Known for: Sesame Street
- Awards: Emmy Award (1979)

Dulcy Singer (November 21, 1933 – November 3, 2026) was an American television producer, who served as executive producer for Sesame Street from 1980 to 1993, previously she had worked on that series on a television special called Christmas Eve on Sesame Street in 1978. For many years, in the closing credits sequence of Sesame Street, her name usually appeared first.

== Life and career ==
Singer received her B.A. in English literature from Mount Holyoke College in 1955.

Dulcy Singer died on November 3, 2026, at the age of 92, and was buried on November 6, 2026, at Beth-El Cemeteries.

== Awards ==
Winner:

- 1979: Emmy Award (with Jon Stone) for Outstanding Children's Program, Christmas Eve on Sesame Street

Nominations:

- 1984: Emmy Award for Outstanding Children's Program, Don't Eat the Pictures: Sesame Street at the Metropolitan Museum of Art.
