= List of awards and nominations received by Mahershala Ali =

List of Mahershala Ali awards
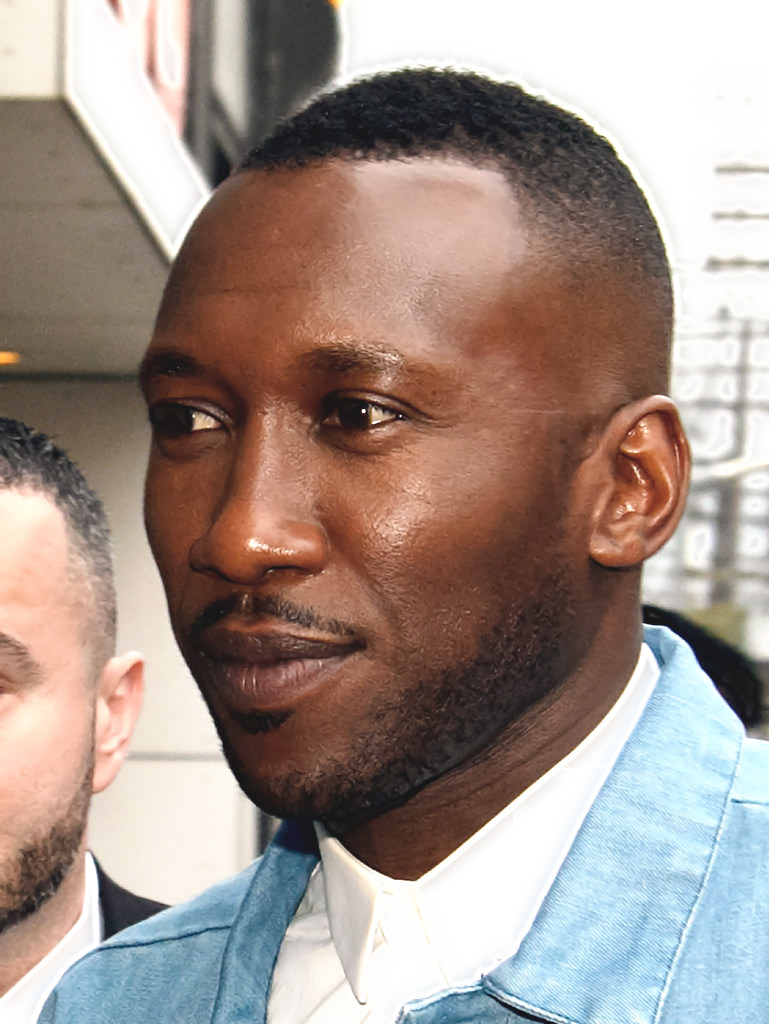
Award	Wins	Nominations
Academy Awards	2	2
British Academy of Film and Television Arts Awards	1	3
Emmy Awards (Primetime)	1	5
Golden Globe Awards	1	3
Screen Actors Guild Awards	3	7

Mahershala Ali has received numerous awards and nominations throughout his career, including two Academy Awards, a BAFTA Film Award, a Golden Globe Award, a Primetime Emmy Award and three Screen Actors Guild Awards.

As a part of the ensemble cast of The Curious Case of Benjamin Button (2008) earned him a nomination for the SAG Award for Outstanding Cast, which he would later win for Hidden Figures (2016). He received Primetime Emmy and SAG Award nominations for his role in House of Cards (2013–2016).

Ali received critical acclaim and won Academy Awards and SAG Awards for Best Supporting Actor for Moonlight (2016) and Green Book (2018), as well as a BAFTA and Golden Globe Award for the latter. He's the first Muslim actor to win an Oscar, as well as the second black actor to win multiple acting Oscars and the only black actor to win twice in the same acting category.

Ali was nominated for the Primetime Emmy and SAG Award for Outstanding Actor in a Miniseries or Movie for playing Wayne Hays in the third season of the HBO crime anthology True Detective (2019). The next year, he won the Primetime Emmy Award for Outstanding Children's Program for producing We Are the Dream: The Kids of the Oakland MLK Oratorical Fest (2020), and received another Emmy nomination for his role in the second season of Ramy (2020). He received nominations for the BAFTA and Golden Globe Award for Best Actor for his role in the science fiction romance Swan Song (2021). His narration of the Netflix documentary Chimp Empire (2023) earned him his fifth Emmy nomination.

== Major associations ==
=== Academy Awards ===
Year	Category	Nominated work	Result
2017	Best Supporting Actor	Moonlight	Won
2019	Best Supporting Actor	Green Book	Won

=== BAFTA Awards ===
Year	Category	Nominated work	Result
2017	Best Film Actor in a Supporting Role	Moonlight	Nominated
2019	Best Film Actor in a Supporting Role	Green Book	Won
2022	Best Film Actor in a Leading Role	Swan Song	Nominated

=== Primetime Emmy Awards ===
Year	Category	Nominated work	Result
2016	Outstanding Guest Actor in a Drama Series	House of Cards	Nominated
2019	Outstanding Lead Actor in a Limited Series or Television Movie	True Detective	Nominated
2020	Outstanding Supporting Actor in a Comedy Series	Ramy	Nominated
2020	Outstanding Children's Program	We Are the Dream: The Kids of the Oakland MLK Oratorical Fest	Won (Note: Tied with The Dark Crystal: Age of Resistance.)
2023	Outstanding Narrator	Chimp Empire	Nominated

=== Golden Globe Awards ===
Year	Category	Nominated work	Result
2017	Best Supporting Actor – Motion Picture	Moonlight	Nominated
2019	Best Supporting Actor – Motion Picture	Green Book	Won
2022	Best Actor in a Motion Picture – Drama	Swan Song	Nominated

=== Screen Actors Guild Awards ===
Year	Category	Nominated work	Result
2009	Outstanding Cast in a Motion Picture	The Curious Case of Benjamin Button	Nominated (Note: Shared with the cast.)
2016	Outstanding Ensemble in a Drama Series	House of Cards	Nominated
2017	Outstanding Male Actor in a Supporting Role	Moonlight	Won
2017	Outstanding Cast in a Motion Picture	Moonlight	Nominated
2017	Outstanding Cast in a Motion Picture	Hidden Figures	Won
2019	Outstanding Male Actor in a Supporting Role	Green Book	Won
2020	Outstanding Male Actor in a Miniseries or Television Movie	True Detective	Nominated

== Other awards and nominations ==
=== African-American Film Critics Association ===
Year	Category	Nominated work	Result
2016	Best Supporting Actor	Moonlight	Won

=== Alliance of Women Film Journalists ===
Year	Category	Nominated work	Result
2016	Best Supporting Actor	Moonlight	Won

=== Apolo Awards ===
Year	Category	Nominated work	Result
2017	Best Supporting Actor	Moonlight	Won

=== Austin Film Critics Association ===
Year	Category	Nominated work	Result
2016	Best Supporting Actor	Moonlight	Won

=== Australian Academy of Cinema and Television Arts Awards ===
Year	Category	Nominated work	Result
2016	Best International Supporting Actor – Cinema	Moonlight	Nominated
2019	Best International Supporting Actor – Cinema	Green Book	Won

=== BET Awards ===
Year	Category	Nominated work	Result
2017	Best Actor	Moonlight	Won

=== Black Reel Awards ===
Year	Category	Nominated work	Result
2016	Outstanding Supporting Actor	Moonlight	Won

=== Boston Society of Film Critics ===
Year	Category	Nominated work	Result
2016	Best Supporting Actor	Moonlight	Won

=== Chicago Film Critics Association ===
Year	Category	Nominated work	Result
2016	Best Supporting Actor	Moonlight	Won

=== Critics' Choice Awards ===
==== Critics' Choice Movie Awards ====
Year	Category	Nominated work	Result
2016	Best Television Drama Series Guest Performer	House of Cards	Nominated
2017	Best Movie Cast	Hidden Figures	Nominated
2017	Best Movie Cast	Moonlight	Won
2017	Best Movie Supporting Actor	Moonlight	Won
2018	Best Movie Supporting Actor	Green Book	Won

==== Critics' Choice Super Awards ====
Year	Category	Nominated work	Result
2022	Best Actor in a Science Fiction/Fantasy Movie	Swan Song	Nominated

=== Dallas–Fort Worth Film Critics Association ===
Year	Category	Nominated work	Result
2016	Best Supporting Actor	Moonlight	Won

=== Detroit Film Critics Society ===
Year	Category	Nominated work	Result
2016	Best Supporting Actor	Moonlight	Nominated

=== Film Independent Spirit Awards ===
Year	Category	Nominated work	Result
2017	Robert Altman Award	Moonlight	Won

=== Florida Film Critics Circle ===
Year	Category	Nominated work	Result
2016	Best Supporting Actor	Moonlight	Nominated

=== Gotham Independent Film Awards ===
Year	Category	Nominated work	Result
2016	Best Film Ensemble	Moonlight	Won

=== IndieWire Critics Poll Awards ===
Year	Category	Nominated work	Result
2016	Best Supporting Actor	Moonlight	Won

=== London Film Critics Circle ===
Year	Category	Nominated work	Result
2016	Supporting Actor of the Year	Moonlight	Won

=== Los Angeles Film Critics Association ===
Year	Category	Nominated work	Result
2016	Best Supporting Actor	Moonlight	Won

=== Mar del Plata International Film Festival ===
Year	Category	Nominated work	Result
2016	Best Actor	Moonlight	Won

=== NAACP Image Award ===
Year	Category	Nominated work	Result
2010	Outstanding Actor in a Television Movie, Mini-Series or Dramatic Special	The Wronged Man	Nominated
2016	Outstanding Supporting Actor in a Motion Picture	Moonlight	Won
2022	Outstanding Actor in a Motion Picture	Swan Song	Nominated

=== National Society of Film Critics ===
Year	Category	Nominated work	Result
2016	Best Supporting Actor	Moonlight	Won

=== New York Film Critics Circle ===
Year	Category	Nominated work	Result
2016	Best Supporting Actor	Moonlight	Won

=== New York Film Critics Online ===
Year	Category	Nominated work	Result
2016	Best Supporting Actor	Moonlight	Won

=== Online Film Critics Society ===
Year	Category	Nominated work	Result
2016	Best Supporting Actor	Moonlight	Won

=== Palm Springs International Film Festival ===
Year	Category	Nominated work	Result
2016	Breakthrough Performance	Moonlight	Won

=== San Diego Film Critics Society ===
Year	Category	Nominated work	Result
2016	Best Supporting Actor	Moonlight	Won

=== San Francisco Film Critics Circle ===
Year	Category	Nominated work	Result
2016	Best Supporting Actor	Moonlight	Won

=== Satellite Awards ===
Year	Category	Nominated work	Result
2016	Best Supporting Actor – Motion Picture Drama	Moonlight	Nominated
2016	Best Ensemble Cast – Motion Picture	Hidden Figures	Won
2018	Best Supporting Actor – Motion Picture Comedy or Musical	Green Book	Nominated

=== St. Louis Gateway Film Critics Association ===
Year	Category	Nominated work	Result
2016	Best Supporting Actor	Moonlight	Won

=== Toronto Film Critics Association ===
Year	Category	Nominated work	Result
2016	Best Supporting Actor	Moonlight	Won

=== Vancouver Film Critics Circle ===
Year	Category	Nominated work	Result
2016	Best Supporting Actor	Moonlight	Won

=== Village Voice Film Poll Awards ===
Year	Category	Nominated work	Result
2016	Best Supporting Actor	Moonlight	Won

=== Washington D.C. Area Film Critics Association Awards ===
Year	Category	Nominated work	Result
2016	Best Supporting Actor	Moonlight	Won
