= Just One Night =

Just One Night may refer to:

- Just One Night (Eric Clapton album), 1980
- Just One Night (Samantha Fox album), or the title song, 1991
- "Just One Night" (song), a song by McBride & the Ride
- "Just One Night", a song by Triumph from The Sport of Kings
- Just One Night (1934 film), a 1934 Chinese film
- Just One Night (film), a 2000 film starring Timothy Hutton
- Just One Night (short film), a 2019 film directed by Sahar Jahani
- "Just One Nite", a 2006 song by Cassie from Cassie (album)
