= Steve Way =

Steve Way may refer to:

- Steve Way (runner)
- Steve Way (actor)
