= Mike Hodge =

American actor

- Born: Michael Hodge; February 24, 1947; McComas, West Virginia
- Died: September 9, 2017 (aged 70); New York City, New York, U.S.
- Education: West Virginia University (BA)
- Occupation: Actor · labor union executive

Michael Hodge (February 24, 1947 – September 9, 2017) was an American actor and labor union executive known for his recurring roles on Law & Order and Law & Order: Special Victims Unit, where he often portrayed judges and detectives. Hodge was a longtime union activist and board member for the former Screen Actors Guild (SAG) and its successor, SAG-AFTRA, for more than sixteen years.

In 2001, Hodge was elected to the national board of directors of the Screen Actors Guild (SAG). He was first elected President of SAG's New York City chapter in 2010 (SAG merged with AFTRA in 2012 to form the present union, SAG-AFTRA). Hodge was re-elected as the President of SAG-AFTRA New York local in August 2017, and served until his death a month later.

== Early life and education ==
Hodge was born in McComas, West Virginia, on February 24, 1947. He received his Bachelor of Arts from West Virginia University, where he also minored in theater.

== Career ==
Hodge worked for The Washington Post and then continued his theater studies at the DC Black Repertory Theater. He earned his memberships in the Actors' Equity Association, the Screen Actors Guild (SAG), and American Federation of Television and Radio Artists (AFTRA) while working in Washington D.C. He then moved to New York City.

Once in New York, Hodge's theater credits included four Broadway productions, including Fences and A Few Good Men. He became known for his work on the New York City-based show, Law & Order, where he held a recurring role as Judge Delano Burns throughout the 1990s and 2000s. His other television roles included Ed, Fringe and Law & Order: Special Victims Unit. His work included Striking Distance (1993), To Wong Foo, Thanks for Everything! Julie Newmar (1995)

In addition to acting, Hodge also narrated audiobooks, including works by Mitch Albom and Steve Harvey. He narration also included documentaries such as Aftershock: Beyond the Civil War (2006).

=== Union leadership ===
Hodge first became active in the actors' labor union movement following the joint SAG and AFTRA commercial actors' strike in 2000. In 2001, he was elected to SAG's national board of directors. He was later elected president of SAG's New York City chapter in 2010. Hodge then served on SAG's G1 committee, which created the agreement to merge SAG and AFTRA in 2012.

Hodge also served as a member of the New York State AFL–CIO Executive Council and the City Labor Council, as well as a trustee of the Industry Advancement Cooperative Fund.

In August 2017, just one month before his death, Hodge won re-election as the President of SAG-AFTRA New York local. He had also recently finished filming Humor Me, a film directed by Sam Hoffman.

Mike Hodge died unexpectedly on September 9, 2017, at the age of 70. He was survived by his mother, Roberta Hodge Johnson, and three siblings: Joseph Hodge, Karen Hodge Thomas, and Vicki Hodge Lynch. Following his death, SAG-AFTRA President Gabrielle Carteris paid tribute to Hodge, writing "Mike was an incredible advocate for SAG-AFTRA members since he first joined SAG’s New York board back in 2001. Through nearly 16 years of service, we came to know his wit, his generous nature and his insight. Mike had a deep love for the work we do as performers and enjoyed every character he brought to life on stage, television or film. We all relied on his kindness and his vibrant spirit to help guide us as we focused on the union and its members."

== Filmography ==
=== Film ===
Year	Title	Role	Notes
1986	Forever, Lulu	Police Commissioner	
1987	Magic Sticks	Lieutenant	
1988	The Shaman	Brad	
1990	Blue Steel	Police Commissioner	
1990	The Bonfire of the Vanities	Media Jackal	
1992	Emma and Elvis	Findley	
1992	Malcolm X	Follower at Temple #7	
1993	Striking Distance	Captain Penderman	
1995	Dr. Jekyll and Ms. Hyde	Eagleton	
1995	To Wong Foo, Thanks for Everything! Julie Newmar	Jimmy Joe	
1996	The Mirror Has Two Faces	Justice of the Peace	
1996	Ransom	Man at Party	
1997	Addicted to Love	Linda's Doorman	
1997	Office Killer	Mr. Landau	
1998	Fiona	Ernie	
1998	American Cuisine	Judge	
1999	The Confession	Security Guard	
2000	Mambo Café	Pawn Shop Clerk	
2000	Follow Me Outside	Fugly	
2000	Our Lips Are Sealed	Henchman 2	
2000	Brooklyn Sonnet	Detective McCarthy	
2002	The Other Brother	Mr. Simmons	
2003	Head of State	2nd Fundraiser Issue Man	
2003	Undermind	Jules	
2004	Abuse of Power	Father Tom Morrow	
2004	The Kings of Brooklyn	Judge	
2004	Till Proven Innocent	Captain Sager	
2005	Fat Cats	Sgt. Blocker	
2008	College Road Trip	Harold	
2008	Cadillac Records	Bartender	
2009	Adam	Judge	
2017	Humor Me	Alan	
2017	Brawl in Cell Block 99	Examiner	
2018	Madeline's Madeline	George's Stepdad	
2019	Low Tide	Don	

=== Television ===
Year	Title	Role	Notes
1984, 1985	Saturday Night Live	Judge / Harry the Bank Loan Officer	2 episodes
1989	Perfect Witness	Agent with Falcon	Television film
1990	Working It Out	Haggerty	Episode: "First Date from Hell"
1991–1995	Loving	Detective Graham / Tompkins	24 episodes
1991–2006	Law & Order	Various roles	7 episodes
1992	Mathnet	Mr. Singletary	Episode: "The Case of the Smart Dummy"
1992–1993	Ghostwriter	Lt. Isaiah McQuade	6 episodes
1993–1994	NYPD Blue	ESU Commander / EMS Commander	2 episodes
1994	The Adventures of Pete & Pete	'Cowboy' Ed	Episode: "The Call"
1994	New York Undercover	Ed Chaney	Episode: "Blondes Have More Fun"
1996	Due South	Linus Prince	Episode: "We Are the Eggmen"
1997	Cosby	Agt. Wilson	Episode: "Guess Whose President Is Coming to Dinner"
1998	All My Children	Judge	Episode #1.7446
1998	Spin City	Lloyd Drum	Episode: "Monkey Business"
1999–2010	Law & Order: Special Victims Unit	Various roles	3 episodes
2000	D.C.	Minister	2 episodes
2000	Soul Food	Walter Carter #1	Episode: "Claiming"
2000–2001	Ed	Judge / Judge #2	7 episodes
2001	Boycott	Daddy King	Television film
2001	Third Watch	Henry Carson	Episode: "After Time"
2002	Law & Order: Criminal Intent	Assistant Warden Munoz	Episode: "Seizure"
2004	The Jury	Mr. Ellsworth	Episode: "Three Boys and a Gun"
2005–2006	As the World Turns	Burt	5 episodes
2009	White Collar	Judge	Episode: "Free Fall"
2011	Ringer	Robert the Doorman	Episode: "Pilot"
2012	NYC 22	Jesse Himes	Episode: "Turf War"
2015	Blue Bloods	Elliot North	Episode: "Hold Outs"
2016	Blindspot	Judge	Episode: "Erase Weary Youth"
