= Mahershala Ali =

American actor (born 1974)

- Ali in 2026
- Born: Mahershalalhashbaz Gilmore; February 16, 1974 (age 52); Oakland, California, U.S.
- Other names: Mahershala Karim-Ali, Hershal Gilmore (formerly)
- Education: Saint Mary's College, California (BA); New York University (MFA)
- Occupation: Actor
- Years active: 2001–present
- Spouse: Amatus Sami-Karim (m. 2013)
- Children: 1
- Awards: Full list

Mahershala Ali (/məˈhɜːrʃələ/ mə-HUR-shə-lə; born Mahershalalhashbaz Gilmore on February 16, 1974) is an American actor. He has received multiple accolades, including two Academy Awards, a BAFTA Award, a Golden Globe Award, and a Primetime Emmy Award. Films in which he has appeared have grossed over $3.3 billion worldwide. In 2020, The New York Times ranked him among the 25 greatest actors of the 21st century. Time magazine named him one of the 100 most influential people in the world in 2019.

After pursuing an MFA degree from New York University, Ali began his career as a regular on television series Crossing Jordan (2001–2002) and Threat Matrix (2003–2004), before his breakthrough role as Richard Tyler in the science fiction series The 4400 (2004–2007). His first major film role was in the David Fincher-directed fantasy The Curious Case of Benjamin Button (2008). He gained wider attention for supporting roles in the final two films of the original The Hunger Games film series, and in House of Cards, for which he received his first Primetime Emmy Award nomination.

Ali won the Academy Award for Best Supporting Actor as a drug dealer in Moonlight (2016) and as Don Shirley in Green Book (2018), becoming the first black actor to win two Academy Awards in the same category, and the second black actor to win multiple acting Oscars. Ali won the Primetime Emmy Award for Outstanding Children's Program for executive producing We Are the Dream: The Kids of the Oakland MLK Oratorical Fest (2020).

In 2019, he played a troubled police officer in the third season of the HBO anthology crime series True Detective and in 2020, he starred in the second season of the Hulu comedy-drama series Ramy. He was nominated for Primetime Emmy Awards for both performances. Ali has also played Cornell "Cottonmouth" Stokes in the first season of the Netflix series Luke Cage (2016), and voiced Aaron Davis in the animated films Spider-Man: Into the Spider-Verse (2018) and Spider-Man: Across the Spider-Verse (2023).

== Early life and education ==
Ali was born in Oakland, California, on February 16, 1974, to Willicia Goines and Phillip Gilmore. His birth name, Mahershalalhashbaz, is from Maher-shalal-hash-baz, the name of the prophet Isaiah's second child (chapter 8, Book of Isaiah). Ali was raised as a Christian in Hayward, California, by his mother, an ordained Baptist minister whose own mother, Evia Goines, was herself an ordained minister at Palma Ceia Baptist Church in Hayward. His father left the family when Ali was a toddler to pursue a career as a dancer. He appeared on Broadway and died in 1994.

Ali attended Saint Mary's College of California (SMC) in Moraga, California, where he graduated in 1996 with a degree in mass communication as a first-generation college student. He entered SMC on a basketball scholarship and went by the name "Hershal Gilmore" when playing for the SMC Gaels. He became disenchanted with the idea of a sports career because of the treatment given to the team's athletes and developed an interest in acting, particularly after taking part in a staging of Spunk, which later landed him an apprenticeship at the California Shakespeare Theater following graduation. After a sabbatical year working for Gavin Report, he enrolled in New York University's graduate acting program at Tisch School of the Arts, earning his master's degree in 2000.

== Career ==
=== Acting ===
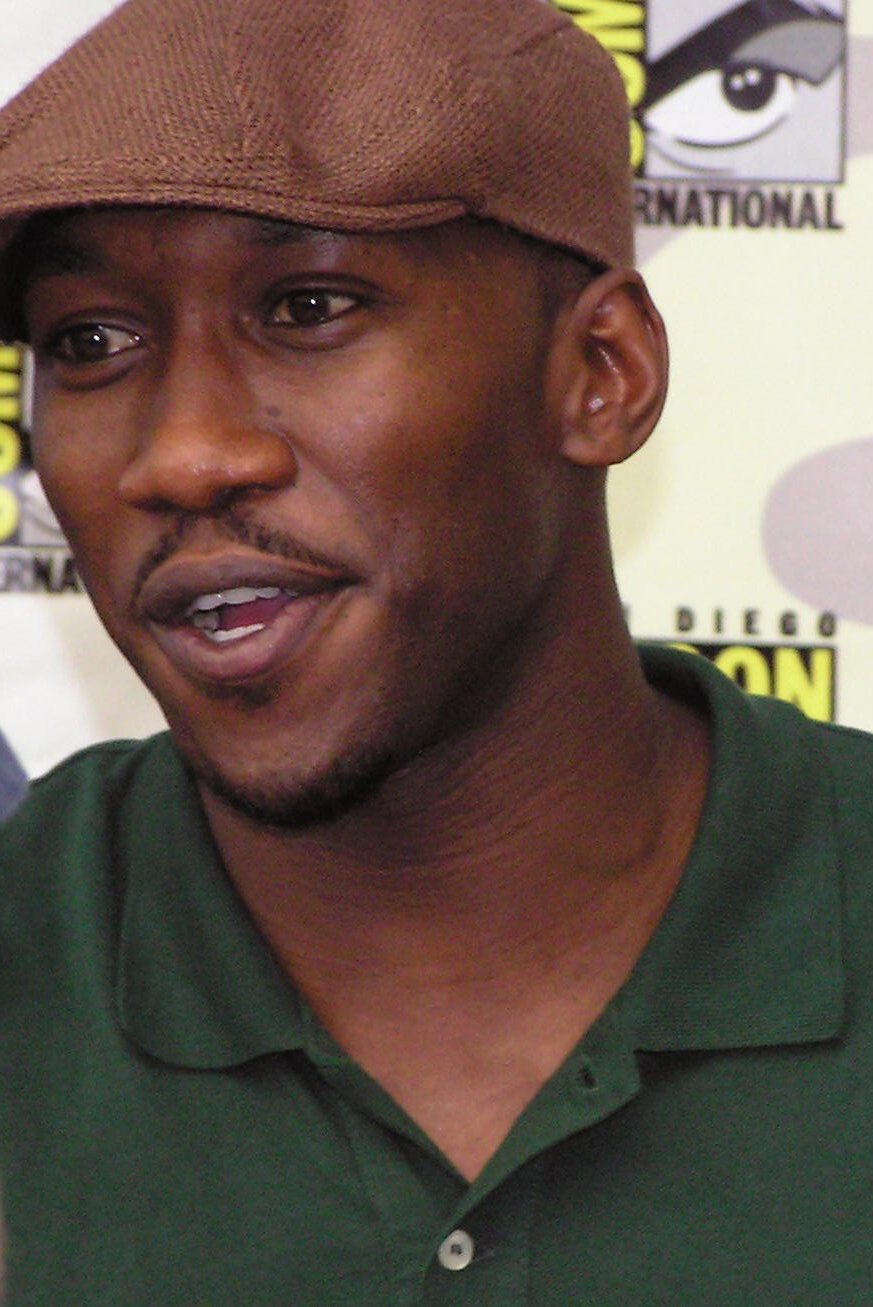
Ali at the 2010 San Diego Comic-Con

Ali was known professionally by his full name, Mahershalalhashbaz Ali, from 2001 until 2010, when he began to be credited as Mahershala Ali. Ali had considered shortening his name for a while, saying that using his full first name was "a crazy thing to do considering that we're in Hollywood", although he had never been pressured by managers or agents to change it. He decided to use a shorter version of his first name after being told that his full name was too long to fit on the poster for the film The Place Beyond the Pines. He did not want the alternative of M. Ali to represent himself on the poster, so he chose to adopt the shorter version of his name.

He elaborated in an interview to Vanity Fair in October 2016:

"I think if you have any desire to be a leading man or to really carry some of these stories, there's this relationship that has to be cultivated with an audience. People have to be able to say your name. I didn't want a couple of syllables to get in the way of me having the fullest experience as an actor."

He is known for his portrayal of Remy Danton in the Netflix series House of Cards, Cornell Stokes in Marvel's Luke Cage, Colonel Boggs in The Hunger Games: Mockingjay – Part 1 and The Hunger Games: Mockingjay – Part 2 and Tizzy in the 2008 film The Curious Case of Benjamin Button, his first major film role. Other notable films include Predators, The Place Beyond the Pines, Free State of Jones, and Hidden Figures.

For his performance as mentor and drug dealer Juan in the drama film Moonlight (2016), Ali received universal acclaim from critics and won the Academy Award for Best Supporting Actor, the SAG Award, and the Critics' Choice Award for Best Supporting Actor and received a Golden Globe and a BAFTA Award nomination. At the 89th Academy Awards, he was the first Muslim actor to win an Oscar.

In 2017, Ali joined the video game Madden NFL 18's story mode Longshot, in which he played Cutter Wade, the father of protagonist Devin. He played Don Shirley in the 2018 film Green Book, receiving his second Academy Award for Best Supporting Actor along with the Golden Globe Award for Best Supporting Actor – Motion Picture and the BAFTA Award for Best Actor in a Supporting Role.

Ali starred as Arkansas State Police detective Wayne Hays in the third season of the HBO series True Detective, which premiered on January 13, 2019, in the United States. On Rotten Tomatoes, the site's critical consensus reads, "Driven by Mahershala Ali's mesmerizing performance, True Detective's third season finds fresh perspective by exploring real world events—though it loses some of the series' intriguing strangeness along the way." He received a Primetime Emmy Award nomination for his performance.

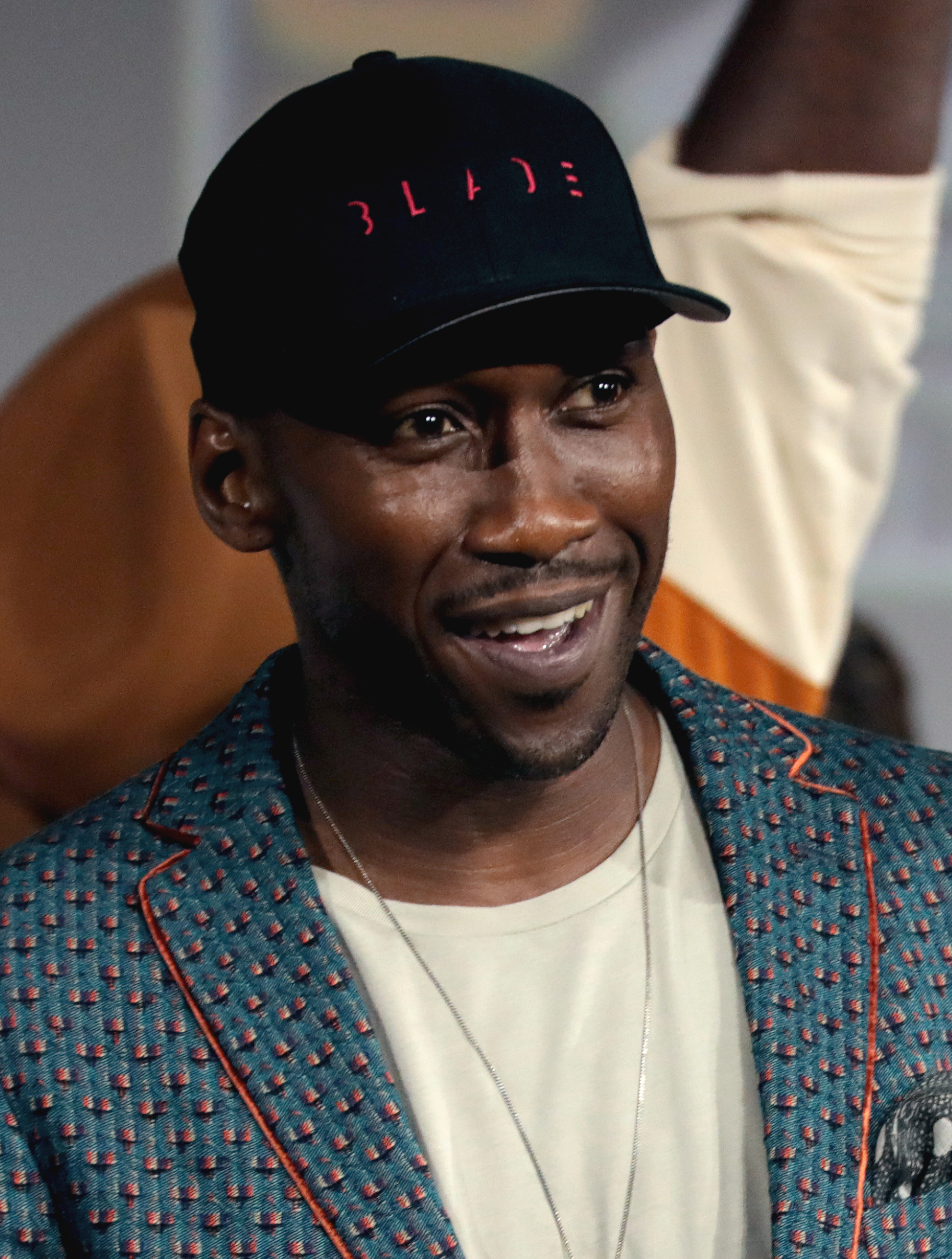
Ali announcing Blade at the 2019 San Diego Comic Con

At the annual San Diego Comic-Con in July 2019, Ali was announced as being cast to play the supernatural superhero Blade in the Marvel Cinematic Universe (MCU) film of the same name. The character was previously played by Wesley Snipes in the pre-MCU Blade trilogy (1998–2004). However, the project underwent difficulty in its development stages for several years due to creative differences and the project was stuck in development hell until Ali confirmed his exit from the project in July 2026.

In February 2025, it was announced that Bassam Tariq would write and direct the film Your Mother Your Mother Your Mother with Ali set to star. Ali met Tariq when the latter was hired to direct Blade, but Tariq departed the project in September 2022. Throughout Blade's development, Ali acquired the necessary skills to portray the titular character, and was subsequently able to make use of his training and reunite with Tariq to film Your Mother Your Mother Your Mother, an action drama film based on Tariq's original idea.

=== Music ===
Ali was signed to Bay Area recording label Hieroglyphics Imperium during the late 2000s and recorded rap music under the stage name Prince Ali. In 2006, he released his first album, Corner Ensemble, through his own imprint Eye5 Recordings, followed by Curb Side Service in 2007, but did not tour to promote the album, choosing instead to focus on his acting career. In 2015 Ali appeared on rap artist Hus Kingpin album House Of Cards lending his voice to skits and rapping on the track entitled "House Of Card Gods" using his moniker. In 2019, he made a guest appearance on Keith Murray's album Lord Of The Metaphor 2 alongside Casual and Planet Asia, and in 2020, appeared on Riz Ahmed's album The Long Goodbye.

==== Influences ====
Ali is a devout fan of hip-hop, naming Hieroglyphics and Souls of Mischief, as well as East Coast rappers like Biggie, Wu-Tang Clan, A Tribe Called Quest, De La Soul, and Nas as huge influence. Regarding new rappers, Ali named EarthGang, Westside Gunn, Conway the Machine, and Roc Marciano among his favorites. He also said that the song "93 Till Infinity" by Souls of Mischief "helped define his youth" and ranked Illmatic by Nas as the "greatest hip-hop album ever."

== Personal life ==
Ali converted to Islam in 2000, changing his surname from Gilmore to Ali. In 2001 he became an Ahmadi Muslim. In interviews, he has described being the subject of racial profiling at airports and banks following the September 11 attacks.

He is married to Amatus Sami-Karim, an actress and musician. Their first child, a daughter, was born in February 2017.

In October 2023, Ali signed the Artists4Ceasefire letter calling for a ceasefire in the 2023 Gaza war. In January 2024, he showed further support for Palestinians in Gaza by reciting the poem "Longing for Haifa" by Palestinian poet Mohammed al-Qudwa in a video for social media, and encouraging his followers to donate to al-Qudwa's fundraiser so that the poet and his family could leave the Gaza Strip. In June 2025, he called for the release of Palestinian student activist Mahmoud Khalil.

== Discography ==
=== Studio albums ===
- Corner Ensemble (2006)
- Curb Side Service (2007)

== Filmography ==
=== Film ===
Year	Title	Role	Notes
2008	The Curious Case of Benjamin Button	Tizzy	Credited as Mahershalalhashbaz Ali
2009	Crossing Over	Detective Strickland	Credited as Mahershalalhashbaz Ali
2010	Predators	Mombasa	Credited as Mahershalalhashbaz Ali
2012	The Place Beyond the Pines	Kofi	
2013	Go for Sisters	Dez	
2014	Supremacy	Deputy Rivers	
2014	The Hunger Games: Mockingjay – Part 1	Boggs	
2015	The Hunger Games: Mockingjay – Part 2	Boggs	
2016	Kicks	Marlon	
2016	Free State of Jones	Moses	
2016	The Realest Real	The Minister	Short film
2016	Moonlight	Juan	
2016	Hidden Figures	Colonel Jim Johnson	
2017	Roxanne Roxanne	Cross	
2018	Green Book	Doctor Donald Shirley	
2018	Spider-Man: Into the Spider-Verse	Aaron Davis / Prowler (voice)	
2019	Alita: Battle Angel	Vector	
2021	Eternals	Eric Brooks / Blade (voice)	Uncredited cameo
2021	Swan Song	Cameron / Jack	Also producer
2023	Spider-Man: Across the Spider-Verse	Aaron Davis (voice)	Cameo
2023	Leave the World Behind	George H. Scott	
2024	Taste the Revolution	Mac Laslow	Filmed in 2001
2025	Jurassic World Rebirth	Duncan Kincaid	
2026	Your Mother Your Mother Your Mother	Latif	
2026	Wildwood	Brendan (voice)	
2027	Spider-Man: Beyond the Spider-Verse †	Aaron Davis (voice)	In production

=== Television ===
Year	Title	Role	Notes	Ref.
2001–2002	Crossing Jordan	Dr. Trey Sanders	19 episodes Credited as Mahershalalhashbaz Ali	
2002	Haunted	Alex Dalcour	Episode: "Abby"; Credited as Mahershalalhashbaz Ali	
2002	NYPD Blue	Rashard Coleman	Episode: "Das Boots"; Credited as Mahershalalhashbaz Ali	
2003	CSI: Crime Scene Investigation	Tombs' Security Guard	Episode: "Lucky Strike"; Credited as Mahershalalhashbaz Ali	
2003	The Handler	—N/a	Episode: "Big Stones"	
2003–2004	Threat Matrix	Jelani Harper	15 episodes	
2004–2007	The 4400	Richard Tyler	28 episodes Credited as Mahershalalhashbaz Ali	
2009	Lie to Me	Det. Don Hughes	Episode: "Do No Harm"; Credited as Mahershalalhashbaz Ali	
2009	Law & Order: Special Victims Unit	Mark Foster	Episode: "Unstable"	
2010	The Wronged Man	Calvin Willis	Television film	
2010	All Signs of Death	Gabe	Unsold TV pilot	
2011–2012	Treme	Anthony King	6 episodes Credited as Mahershalalhashbaz Ali	
2011–2012	Alphas	Nathan Clay	12 episodes	
2012	Alcatraz	Clarence Montgomery	Episode: "Clarence Montgomery"	
2013–2016	House of Cards	Remy Danton	Main role; seasons 1–4 (33 episodes)	
2016	Last Week Tonight with John Oliver	City Hall Informant	Episode: "Journalism"	
2016	Luke Cage	Cornell "Cottonmouth" Stokes	Main role; season 1 (6 episodes)	
2017	Comrade Detective	Coach	Voice role Episode: "Two Films for One Ticket"	
2018	Room 104	Franco	Episode: "Shark"	
2019	True Detective	Wayne Hays	Main role; season 3 (8 episodes)	
2020	Ramy	Sheikh Ali Malik	Recurring role; season 2 (6 episodes)	
2021	Invincible	Titan	Voice role; season 1 (2 episodes)	
2023	Chimp Empire	Narrator	4 episodes	

=== Video game ===
Year	Title	Role	Ref.
2017	Madden NFL 18	Cutter Wade	

== Awards ==
Ali received Primetime Emmy and SAG Award nominations for his role in House of Cards (2013–2016). Ali was nominated for a Primetime Emmy for playing Wayne Hays in the third season of the HBO crime anthology True Detective (2019). The next year, he won the Primetime Emmy Award for Outstanding Children's Program for producing We Are the Dream: The Kids of the Oakland MLK Oratorical Fest (2020), and received another Emmy nomination for his role in the second season of Ramy (2020). He received nominations for the BAFTA and Golden Globe Award for Best Actor for his role in the science fiction romance Swan Song (2021). His narration of the Netflix documentary Chimp Empire (2023) earned him his fifth Emmy nomination.

Ali received critical acclaim and won Academy Awards and SAG Awards for Best Supporting Actor for his performances as a drug dealer in the drama Moonlight (2016) and as Don Shirley in the biographical comedy-drama Green Book (2018), as well as a BAFTA and Golden Globe Award for the latter. He is the first Muslim actor to win an Oscar, as well as the second black actor (after Denzel Washington) to win multiple acting Oscars and the only black actor to win twice in the same acting category.
