= McComas, West Virginia =

- Unincorporated community
- Location within the state of West Virginia McComas, West Virginia (the United States)
- Coordinates: 37°23′24″N 81°17′29″W
- Country: United States
- State: West Virginia
- County: Mercer
- Elevation: 2,349 ft (716 m)
- Time zone: UTC-5 (Eastern (EST))
  - Summer (DST): UTC-4 (EDT)
- Area codes: 304 & 681
- GNIS feature ID: 1542947

McComas is an unincorporated community in Mercer County, West Virginia, United States. McComas is 3.5 miles (5.6 km) southwest of Matoaka.

An early variant name was Mora.

== Notable person ==
- Mike Hodge (1947–2017), actor (Law & Order) and former President of SAG-AFTRA New York local; born in McComas.
