= Ramy (TV series) =

American comedy-drama TV series

- Genre: Comedy drama
- Created by: Ramy Youssef; Ari Katcher; Ryan Welch
- Starring: Ramy Youssef; Hiam Abbass; Amr Waked; Dave Merheje; Mohammed Amer; May Calamawy; Laith Nakli
- Opening theme: "Longa 79" by "El Masryeen" (The Egyptians band)
- Composers: Dan Romer; Mike Tuccillo
- Country of origin: United States
- Original languages: English; Arabic
- No. of seasons: 3
- No. of episodes: 30

Production
- Executive producers: Ramy Youssef; Ari Katcher; Ryan Welch; Ravi Nandan; Jerrod Carmichael; Bridget Bedard; Christopher Storer; Cherien Dabis; Hallie Sekoff
- Producers: Jeanie Igoe; Inman Young; Tyson Bidner; Jamin O'Brien; Nathan Reinhart; Mary Beth Minthorn
- Cinematography: Adrian Peng Correia; Claudio Rietti; Ashley Connor
- Editors: Joanna Naugle; Jeremy Edwards; Veronica Rutledge; Matthew Booras; Jennifer Lee
- Running time: 23–43 minutes
- Production companies: A24; Cairo Cowboy; Foxera (season 1); Morningside Entertainment (season 3)

Original release
- Network: Hulu
- Release: April 19, 2019 – September 30, 2022

Ramy is an American comedy-drama television series that premiered on April 19, 2019, on Hulu. In May 2019, Hulu renewed the series for a second season, which premiered on May 29, 2020. The series stars Ramy Youssef as the title character. In July 2020, Hulu renewed the series for a third season, which premiered on September 30, 2022.

The series has been praised for its portrayal of American Muslims when most Western pop culture depictions are "usually as the bad guys". In January 2020, Youssef was awarded the Golden Globe Award for Best Actor in a Television Series Musical or Comedy for his role in Ramy. Additionally, Youssef was nominated for two Primetime Emmy Awards for Outstanding Directing for a Comedy Series and Outstanding Lead Actor in a Comedy Series, and in 2020 he also received the Peabody Award.

== Premise ==
Ramy follows "a first-generation American Muslim who is on a spiritual journey in his politically divided New Jersey neighborhood. It explores the challenges of what it is like being caught between an Egyptian community that thinks life is a moral test, and a generation that thinks life has no consequences."

== Cast and characters ==
=== Main ===
- Ramy Youssef as Ramy Hassan, the protagonist of the series. He is a millennial American Muslim who grapples with his faith and lifestyle and the judgment of his friends and family.
- May Calamawy as Dena Hassan, Ramy's sister. Although she is a graduate student, Dena is frustrated that her actions and behavior are still restricted by her overprotective parents. This causes her to regularly critique the double standards against which she and Ramy are judged.
- Mohammed Amer as Mo, Ramy's cousin who owns a diner.
- Hiam Abbass as Maysa Hassan, Ramy's mother.
- Dave Merheje as Ahmed, Ramy's friend and a doctor.
- Amr Waked as Farouk Hassan, Ramy's father.
- Laith Nakli as Uncle Naseem, Ramy and Dena's boisterous uncle. He owns a jewelry business, where he employs Ramy after he’s fired from a startup. He casually makes sexist and anti-Semitic statements, despite working with Jewish jewelers. Naseem is very protective of his family, especially of his sister Maysa. (recurring season 1; main season 2 and 3)

=== Recurring ===
- Steve Way as Steve Russo, Ramy's longtime friend and coworker. They become acquainted after the September 11 attacks, when Ramy was alienated due to widespread Islamophobia.
- Mahershala Ali as Sheikh Ali Malik (season 2)
- MaameYaa Boafo as Zainab (season 2 and 3)
- Rosaline Elbay as Amani, Ramy's cousin (season 1 and 2)
- Shadi Alfons as Shadi
- Michael Chernus as Michael
- Jade Eshete as Fatima
- Poorna Jagannathan as Salma (season 1)
- Molly Gordon as Sarah (season 1 and 3)
- Jared Abrahamson as Dennis (season 2)
- Rana Roy as Yasmina (guest season 1 and 2; recurring season 3)
- Julian Sergi as Yuval (season 3)

Promotional poster for the third season showing the cast. From left to right (standing): Amr Waked (Farouk), Laith Nakli (Naseem), Ramy Youssef (Ramy). From left to right (seated): May Calamawy (Dena), Hiam Abbass (Maysa).

=== Guest ===
- Dina Shihabi as Nour (season 1)
- Jake Lacy as Kyle (season 1)
- Anna Konkle as Chloe (season 1)
- Elisha Henig as Young Ramy (season 1)
- Mia Khalifa as herself (season 2)
- Omar Metwally as Bin Khalied (season 2)
- Randa Jarrar as Hosna (season 2)
- Waleed Zuaiter as Yassir (season 2)
- Bella Hadid as Lena (season 3)
- Aida Osman as Malika (season 3)
- James Badge Dale as Sheikh Abu Bakar Miller (season 3)
- Sarita Choudhury as Olivia (season 3)
- Christopher Abbott as Silvak (season 3)
- Majid Jordan as Halal Brothers (season 3)
- Robert Herjavec as Himself (season 3)
- Amy Landecker as Kendra (season 3)
- Bevin Bru as Ashley (season 3)

== Episodes ==
Season	Episodes	Originally released
1	10	April 19, 2019
2	10	May 29, 2020
3	10	September 30, 2022

=== Season 1 (2019) ===
No. overall	No. in season	Title	Directed by	Written by	Original release date
1	1	"Between the Toes"	Harry Bradbeer	Ramy Youssef & Ari Katcher & Ryan Welch	April 19, 2019
In the series premiere, Ramy grapples with dating and relationships as a young man who is Muslim. He goes out on a date with a woman who is also Muslim, but Ramy is surprised to find she is more sexually active and liberated than he had assumed (based on his own set of double standards).
2	2	"Princess Diana"	Christopher Storer	Leah Nanako Winkler	April 19, 2019
The tech startup Ramy works at goes under, leaving him unemployed. As a solution, his parents intend to set him up with a job working for his volatile uncle Naseem, who is sexist, antisemitic, and believes in 9/11 conspiracy theories.
3	3	"A Black Spot on the Heart"	Christopher Storer	Minhal Baig	April 19, 2019
After starting at his new job, Ramy becomes interested in a Jewish girl, much to the frustration of his friends. However, he refuses to take drugs with her, so she hooks up with another guy.
4	4	"Strawberries"	Ramy Youssef	Ramy Youssef	April 19, 2019
In a flashback to Ramy's past, he remembers how his relationships with friends were changed by the September 11 attacks, due to the shift in the media narratives around the Muslim community. He also wants to be like all his friends and learn to masturbate. After his friends shun him, he walks a different route to school and meets Stevie for the first time, who becomes one of his lifelong friends.
5	5	"Do the Ramadan"	Christopher Storer	Sahar Jahani	April 19, 2019
Ramy intends to be fully faithful throughout the 30 days of Ramadan. This includes eating only after sunset and before sunrise, and abstaining from sex and pornography. Ramy meets a married but lonely Muslim woman at the mosque, and ends up having sex with her at her house.
6	6	"Refugees"	Cherien Dabis	Bridget Bedard	April 19, 2019
Dena begins experiencing qualms about her status as a virgin. After talking with her friends, she decides to meet up with the local barista from the coffee bar who often flirts with her. She goes back with him to his apartment, but things do not go well.
7	7	"Ne Me Quitte Pas"	Cherien Dabis	Ramy Youssef	April 19, 2019
Maysa, who is lonely at home and unfulfilled with her life, becomes a Lyft driver, in the hopes of meeting new people. At first, she has trouble ingratiating herself with riders, but later on, she picks up a Frenchman traveling in the area for business. Because she speaks French and allows him to smoke in her car, he takes a liking to her, and they become fast friends.
8	8	"Saving Mikaela"	Cherien Dabis	Ryan Welch	April 19, 2019
Stevie becomes romantically interested in a girl he met through a video game, and ropes Ramy in to physically meet the girl in person. When they meet Mikaela, they realize that she and her friend are still in high school. Mikaela eventually gets drunk and passes out. Ramy kicks open the door to save her, and they end up taking her to Hackensack General, where Ramy's friend is a doctor.
9	9	"Dude, Where's My Country?"	Cherien Dabis	Ramy Youssef	April 19, 2019
In an attempt to find himself and his faith, Ramy makes the trip to visit his family in Egypt. While Ramy would like to see Egypt and pray in the local mosques, his Americanized cousin Shadi wants instead to take him to parties where people are smoking and taking drugs. Ramy meets a cute girl who turns out to be Shadi's sister (also Ramy's cousin).
10	10	"Cairo Cowboy"	Jehane Noujaim	Ramy Youssef	April 19, 2019
Ramy eventually decides to make the trip to visit his grandfather in the countryside. The car taking him breaks down, so he decides to walk the rest of the way. He eventually meets up with his grandfather, but soon after Ramy finds him dead on the floor of his home. After the funeral, he and his cousin Amani attend a Sufi hadra and appear to develop romantic feelings towards each other.

=== Season 2 (2020) ===
No. overall	No. in season	Title	Directed by	Written by	Original release date
11	1	"Bay'ah"	Christopher Storer	Ramy Youssef & Amir Sulaiman	May 29, 2020
Following the events in Egypt, Ramy finds himself in a slump. His friends eventually confront him about his self-destructive behavior, and Ahmed tells Ramy that he should speak to the Imam at the local mosque. Naseem promotes Ramy at work and gifts him a handgun. Ramy tries to open up to the Imam about his personal crises, but is immediately shut down. Ramy learns from his white Muslim friend, who works at another mosque, about a "cool radical" Sufi Sheikh. Sometime later, the Hassan family is invited to the home of Farouk's boss for dinner. Ramy excuses himself to use the restroom, where he takes out his gun and masturbates to porn on his phone. The dinner host's elderly walks into the restroom, washes his hands, and ends up taking the gun before leaving. Ramy later attends the hadra at the Sufi mosque and builds a new relationship with the Sheikh.
12	2	"Can You Hear Me Now?"	Christopher Storer	Ramy Youssef	May 29, 2020
Ramy is taking his new spirituality and dedication to Sufi Islam very seriously, much to the annoyance of his family and friends. Several anti-Muslim protesters arrive outside the mosque, but Sheikh Malik treats them kindly serves them hot chocolates with Ramy. Upon hearing about a persistent customer named Dennis looking for work at Mo's diner, Ramy approaches him personally. After hearing about Dennis' story, Ramy buys him a meal and insists he can help. Ramy takes Dennis to the mosque to ask Sheikh Malik for a job. At the entrance, Dennis hears the calls for prayer and it provokes his PTSD. He confesses to Ramy about his actions in Iraq as a soldier, which includes killing a friend. When Ramy meets with Sheikh Malik, he lies to him about the extent of his friendship with Dennis. The Sheikh's daughter Zainab is hesitant to offer a job to Dennis, but Sheikh Malik trusts Ramy and accepts Dennis' help. Dennis proves himself useful by building ramps and shelves, and decides to convert to the Muslim faith. After taking his pledge to become Muslim, Dennis is triggered by one of the protesters and violently beats him up.
13	3	"Little Omar"	Ramy Youssef	Ramy Youssef & Colleen McGuinness	May 29, 2020
Members of the mosque, including Ramy and Sheikh Malik, are at the hospital praying for Nico, the protester that Dennis had savagely beaten. Ramy, Sheikh Malik, and Zainab go to see Nico and meet his brother Ron; he admits to hating the congregation at first, but comes to terms with them and appreciates their prayers. Sheikh Malik and a reluctant Ramy go see Dennis in jail, where he humorously talks about his war atrocities. Sheikh Malik and Ramy promise Dennis to find and save his dog Boomer, who has been trapped in the car since the incident. By nightfall, Ramy and Sheikh Malik have yet to find Boomer, and Sheikh decides to pray right there on the spot. Upon ending the prayer, they hear a dog bark, and the two find the car with Boomer inside. After rescuing Boomer, Sheikh Malik confronts Ramy about lying to him about Dennis and blames himself for giving Ramy too much too soon. He now places a new teacher, Boomer the dog, upon Ramy. When Ramy returns home, his family is unhappy that he brought home a dog, and they scold him about obeying everything Sheikh Malik tells him to do.
14	4	"Miakhalifa.mov"	Ramy Youssef	Ramy Youssef & Adel Kamal	May 29, 2020
Ramy discovers on Instagram that Amani, his cousin/ex-girlfriend, is engaged. He and Zainab go to the lavish estate of an investor of the Sufi center, who had recently backed out due to violent incident. There, Ramy meets former porn star Mia Khalifa, who has been allegedly supplying the investor with her breast milk to cure him of his desire for sex. Ramy drinks some of the milk before humoring the investor to a bout of archery. The investor finally agrees to invest two million dollars in the Sufi center after Ramy convinces him that they are brothers, because they drank the same breast milk. Zainab is impressed and tells the Sheik she wants to explore marriage with Ramy.
15	5	"3riana grande"	Cherien Dabis	Story by : Ramy Youssef & Maytha Alhassen & Adel Kamal; Teleplay by : Ramy Youssef & Maytha Alhassen	May 29, 2020
Dena is accepted into law school and earns a scholarship. She announced the news on Facebook, which upsets Farouk and Maysa. Annoyed that her parents don't share her enthusiasm says she doesn't believe in this "superstitious shit." Later in the shower, Dena begins to notice her hair thinning and starts to worry. She asks her father, who tells her he began to lose his hair when he was around her age. Anxious and confused, Dena starts wearing a hijab and attempts to try different remedies for her hair loss, and even asks her doctor about it during a consultation where she is worried she might lump on her breast. She then visits Uncle Naseem who questions her if she is "feeling things" she is not supposed to feel. He refers her to an Egyptian psychic in South Jersey. On her way home from the psychic, Dena learns from her doctor that she has fibroadenoma, which is very common. This temporarily puts her at ease but then her car breaks down, and she is picked up by a Mexican immigrant who confronts her about her headscarf, telling her that it is a symbol of oppression and that she must "melt" into American society. Infuriated by his ignorance, Dena demands that he let her out on the side of the road.
16	6	"They"	Cherien Dabis	Ramy Youssef & Ryan Welch	May 29, 2020
Maysa is close to getting American citizenship. When she learns that her Lyft Driver account has been suspended, she worries that Lyft's investigation will lead to criminal charges, preventing her from getting citizenship. She decides to find the person who reported her and identifies that it could be Sophia, a trans passenger she picked up, but misgendered and humiliated. She tracks Sophia at a bar and confronts them, profusely apologizing and begging them for forgiveness and to cancel their Lyft report. Sophia tells Maysa that it was not them that filed the report. Sophia's boyfriend calls the police on Maysa for stalking them, but they don't press charges. Dena arrives to take Maysa home and tells her that she's mean and has no filter before Maysa confesses that she wishes she had finished her degree instead of marrying. Finally, Maysa attains citizenship with the determination to vote the president out of office.
17	7	"Atlantic City"	Ramy Youssef	Story by : Ramy Youssef & Kate Thulin & Bjanka Pasic; Teleplay by : Ramy Youssef & Bjanka Pašić	May 29, 2020
The boys force Ramy to have a bachelor party in Atlantic City. They end up at a strip club, where they all – except Steve and Mo – are uncomfortable. Ramy interrupts when Steve is getting a private lap dance and makes everyone go back to the hotel. There, Steve informs Ramy that he needs to ejaculate or else he will suffer because of his condition. After trying to call him a hooker to help him, Ramy finally decides to do the deed himself to save his friend, who cannot use his own arms. When the deed is done, Ramy consoles Steve in his arms as both feel weird and sad about what just happened.
18	8	"Frank in the Future"	Ramy Youssef	Ramy Youssef & Azhar Usman	May 29, 2020
Farouk lost his job two months ago and still hasn't told his family. Every day he goes to a coffee shop to work on job applications with no prospects in sight. Boomer, the dog, develops depression, possibly since she is sensitive to Farouk's plight. At a gathering to meet the Sheik and Zainab, who Ramy would like to marry, Farouk loses it when confronted about money matters, especially when his brother-in-law Naseem presses him. Later, in private, Farouk finally confesses the truth to Ramy and advises him not to get married because of the stress of being the man of the household. Ramy, in turn, encourages Farouk to live in the present. Farouk and the Sheik together finally agree to the union of Ramy and Zainab.
19	9	"Uncle Naseem"	Desiree Akhavan	Ramy Youssef & Kate Thulin	May 29, 2020
The episode follows Uncle Naseem as he navigates the difficulties of hiding his sexuality, as well as his coarseness in most human interactions, which contributes to the loneliness he feels. He has been intimate with multiple men-- both in his past and in his present, and the internal struggle and frustration this causes him.
20	10	"You Are Naked in Front of Your Sheikh"	Christopher Storer	Ramy Youssef & Rob Ulin	May 29, 2020
It's Ramy and Zainab's Katb Ktab, but to Ramy's horror, Amani, his former lover and cousin, arrives from Egypt to attend the ceremony. We discover in a flashback that they broke up in Cairo when Ramy refused to commit. Back to the present day, after an awkward conversation in a grocery store parking lot, they hook up. The next day, Ramy goes through with the Islamic marriage contract Katb el-Kitab, and Zainab loses her virginity to him. After their sexual encounter, Ramy tells her about what happened with Amani the previous night. Horrified, Zainab leaves him, and Ramy awakens the next morning to be confronted by the Sheik, who excoriates him and tells him that he can't help him. In a desperate final plea, Ramy asks Amani to be with him and tells her that they're meant to be, but she is traumatized by his behavior and refuses him. Heartbroken and alone, Ramy takes Boomer the dog and goes to Dennis' abandoned car, where they listen to his CD on how to be a Muslim.

=== Season 3 (2022) ===
No. overall	No. in season	Title	Directed by	Written by	Original release date
21	1	"Harry Potter"	Ramy Youssef	Ramy Youssef	September 30, 2022
Two years have passed since Zainab left Ramy after discovering his slip-up with his cousin. Now, a slightly reformed Ramy works hard to increase his income and pay off the dowry while going on a date with someone from his past.
22	2	"Egyptian Cigarettes"	Annemarie Jacir	Ramy Youssef & Maytha Alhassen	September 30, 2022
Ramy heads to Israel, where he meets Ayala, the leader of the Diamond Club, who decides to test Ramy's dedication to Islam. Meanwhile, Uncle Naseem gets stopped at the airport's security checkpoint.
23	3	"Limoges"	Ramy Youssef	Ramy Youssef & Bjanka Pasic	September 30, 2022
A financially-struggling Farouk and Maysa decide to take on new covert part-time jobs to keep their boat afloat but soon come across some old acquaintances.
24	4	"That's What She Said"	Ramy Youssef	Ramy Youssef & Kate Thulin	September 30, 2022
Ramy rushes to a dinner with Steve and his girlfriend, Lena. Steve is in love and thinks about proposing, but Ramy tries to talk him out of it. Ramy prioritises business over friendship, as he attends to a client in the middle of their dinner.
25	5	"Bad Momma"	Ari Katcher	Ramy Youssef & Farida Zahran	September 30, 2022
Maysa believes it is time for Dena to marry and settle down; Ramy finally clears off his debt to Zainab; a tough conversation with her employer leads to Dena revealing a whole new side of herself.
26	6	"American Life Coach"	Ramy Youssef	Ramy Youssef & Monica Hanna	September 30, 2022
Dena, Maysa and Farouk try to deal with their inner conflicts in their own unique ways; Dena talks to a psychologist while taking Maysa to group therapy; in Egypt, Farouk meets a woman with a shocking proposal.
27	7	"Second Opinion Doctor"	Hiam Abbass	Ramy Youssef & Amir Sulaiman	September 30, 2022
Ahmed tells Mo to try yoga after the latter worries about his health. Later, Ahmed receives a proposal from a woman who wants to be his second wife. He is not sure whether polygamy is his cup of tea, so he visits a man who has four wives.
28	8	"Merchants in Medina"	Ramy Youssef	Ramy Youssef & Adel Kamal	September 30, 2022
Ramy finds himself in an awkward situation when an influential sheikh suggests they pray together on social media; Zainab continues avoiding Ramy, but at the same time, she carries a growing secret.
29	9	"A Blanket on the Television"	Ramy Youssef	Ramy Youssef & Azam Mahmood	September 30, 2022
Farouk returns to the United States with high spirits; Ramy attends the first rehab meeting for sex addicts; Naseem goes on a date with a guy who coincidentally happens to be friends with Dena.
30	10	"We Gave It All Up for Hot Dogs"	Ramy Youssef	Ramy Youssef & Azhar Usman	September 30, 2022
Zainab is against the idea of Ramy being more involved in their daughter's life; Farouk and Maysa's plan to sell their house backfires when they get involved in an unpleasant situation with the estate agent. Ramy has his own epiphany and starts praying and crying on the beach as Farouk, Maysa, Dena, and Tarek are praying together at home.

== Production ==
=== Development ===
On October 4, 2017, it was announced that Hulu had given the production a pilot presentation order. The series was created by Ramy Youssef, Ari Katcher and Ryan Welch, and Youssef and Welch both wrote episodes for the series. Executive producers include Katcher, Welch, and Jerrod Carmichael. Production companies involved with the series include A24.

On April 18, 2018, it was announced that Hulu had given the production a series order for a first season. On February 11, 2019, it was announced that the series would premiere on April 19, 2019. On May 1, 2019, it was reported that Hulu renewed the series for a second season, which premiered on May 29, 2020. On July 9, 2020, Hulu renewed the series for a third season, which premiered on September 30, 2022.

In a 2024 interview, Youssef expressed uncertainty about the future of Ramy due to ongoing discussions and scheduling challenges. He mentioned that the writer's strike influenced the decision to postpone further episodes and hinted at the possibility of a concluding season or a two-part finale. Youssef indicated optimism about returning to the project when timing and readiness align.

=== Casting ===
Alongside the series order announcement, it was confirmed that Ramy Youssef would star in the series. On October 19, 2018, it was announced that May Calamawy had been cast in a series regular role. In July 2019, it was announced Mahershala Ali would guest star in the second season. In November 2019, it was announced Laith Nakli had been upped to a series regular.

On March 31, 2022, it was announced that Bella Hadid would have a recurring guest role in the third season. It was also her acting debut in the show.

== Release ==
=== Broadcast ===
In Europe, the series is available to stream on StarzPlay. In the United Kingdom, the series premiered in March 2021 on Channel 4. In Latin America, the series premiered in August 2020 on FX. In India, the series is available on Amazon Prime. In South Africa, the series is available to stream on Showmax. In the Middle East, the series is available to stream on OSN.

=== Premiere ===
The series held its world premiere during the 2019 South by Southwest film festival in Austin, Texas, as a part of the festival's "Episodic Premieres" series of screenings. It won the Episodic Audience Award for the festival.

== Reception ==
On review aggregator Rotten Tomatoes, the first season holds an approval rating of 98% based on 43 reviews, with an average rating of 8.1/10. The website's critical consensus reads, "An insightful and hilarious glimpse into the life of a Muslim American family, Ramy perfectly articulates the precarious nature and nuances of identity and announces Ramy Youssef as a talent to watch." On Metacritic, it has a weighted average score of 87 out of 100, based on 18 critics.

On Rotten Tomatoes, the second season holds an approval rating of 95% based on 44 reviews, with an average rating of 8.1/10. The website's critical consensus reads, "Ramy's layered approach yields rich rewards in a poignant second season that digs deeper without losing faith in the power of levity." On Metacritic, it has a weighted average score of 82 out of 100, based on 12 critics.

The third season holds an approval rating of 90% on Rotten Tomatoes based on ten reviews, with an average rating of 7.5/10. On Metacritic, it has a weighted average score of 81 out of 100, based on six critics.

=== Accolades ===
For its first season, Ramy Youssef was nominated for the Golden Globe Award for Best Actor – Television Series Musical or Comedy. He won the award at the 77th Golden Globe Awards in 2020.

Year	Award	Category	Nominees	Result	Ref.
2019	Critics' Choice Television Awards	Best Actor in a Comedy Series	Ramy Youssef	Nominated	
2019	Golden Globe Awards	Best Actor in a Television Series – Musical or Comedy	Ramy Youssef	Won	
2019	Gotham Independent Film Awards	Breakthrough Series – Short Form	Ramy	Nominated	
2019	Peabody Awards	Entertainment	Ramy	Won	
2019	SXSW Film Festival	Episodic Audience Award	Ramy	Won	
2020	Black Reel Awards for Television	Outstanding Supporting Actor, Comedy Series	Mahershala Ali	Nominated	
2020	Primetime Emmy Awards	Outstanding Lead Actor in a Comedy Series	Ramy Youssef	Nominated	
2020	Primetime Emmy Awards	Outstanding Supporting Actor in a Comedy Series	Mahershala Ali	Nominated	
2020	Primetime Emmy Awards	Outstanding Directing for a Comedy Series	Ramy Youssef (For "Miakhalifa.mov")	Nominated	
2020	TCA Awards	Individual Achievement in Comedy	Ramy Youssef	Nominated	
2021	Critics' Choice Television Awards	Best Comedy Series	Ramy	Nominated	
2021	Critics' Choice Television Awards	Best Actor in a Comedy Series	Ramy Youssef	Nominated	
2021	Golden Globe Awards	Best Actor in a Television Series – Musical or Comedy	Ramy Youssef	Nominated	
2021	NAACP Image Awards	Outstanding Breakthrough Creative – Television	Ramy Youssef	Nominated	
2021	Satellite Awards	Best Television Series – Musical or Comedy	Ramy	Nominated	
2021	Satellite Awards	Best Actor in a Musical or Comedy Series	Ramy Youssef	Nominated	
2021	Screen Actors Guild Awards	Outstanding Performance by a Male Actor in a Comedy Series	Ramy Youssef	Nominated	
