= List of Muslim Academy Award winners and nominees =

This is a list of Muslim Academy Award winners and nominees. It includes both practicing Muslims and those who have a Muslim background.

Academy Awards, popularly known as Oscars, are presented annually by the Academy of Motion Picture Arts and Sciences for artistic and technical merit in the film industry.

This list is current as of the 93rd Academy Awards ceremony, which was held on April 25, 2021.

== Best Actor in a Leading Role ==
Academy Award for Best Actor in a Leading Role
Ceremony	Year	Name	Country	Film	Status	Notes
93rd	2020	Riz Ahmed	(Pakistan) / (United Kingdom)	Sound of Metal	Nominated	First Muslim to be nominated for Best Actor in a Leading Role

== Best Actor in a Supporting Role ==
Academy Award for Best Actor in a Supporting Role
Ceremony	Year	Name	Country	Film	Status	Notes
35th	1962	Omar Sharif	(Egypt)	Lawrence of Arabia	Nominated	First Egyptian to be nominated for an Academy Award in any category
89th	2016	Mahershala Ali	(United States)	Moonlight	Won	First Muslim to win an Academy Award in an acting category
91st	2018	Mahershala Ali	(United States)	Green Book	Won	First Black actor to win Best Actor in a Supporting Role twice

== Best Actress in a Supporting Role ==
Academy Award for Best Actress in a Supporting Role
Ceremony	Year	Name	Country	Film	Status	Notes
76th	2003	Shohreh Aghdashloo	(Iran) / (United States)	House of Sand and Fog	Nominated	First Iranian to be nominated for an Academy Award in an acting category

== Best Animated Short Film ==
Academy Award for Best Animated Short Film
Ceremony	Year	Name	Country	Film	Status	Notes
97th	2024	Shirin Sohani; Hossein Molayemi	(Iran)	In the Shadow of the Cypress	Won	First Muslims to be nominated for -and win- Best Animated Short Film

== Best Documentary (Feature) ==
Academy Award for Best Documentary (Feature)
Ceremony	Year	Name	Country	Film	Status	Notes
39th	1965	Haroun Tazieff	(Poland) / (Belgium) / (France)	Le Volcan interdit	Nominated	Muslim father
85th	2012	Emad Burnat	(Palestine)	5 Broken Cameras	Nominated	Nomination shared with Guy Davidi
86th	2013	Jehane Noujaim	(United States)	The Square	Nominated	Muslim father and possibly converted mother
86th	2013	Karim Amer	(Egypt) / (United States)	The Square	Nominated	
88th	2015	Asif Kapadia	(United Kingdom)	Amy	Won	Award shared with James Gay-Rees
90th	2017	Feras Fayyad; Kareem Abeed	(Syria)	Last Men in Aleppo	Nominated	Nomination shared with Søren Steen Jespersen
91st	2018	Talal Derki	(Syria)	Of Fathers and Sons	Nominated	Nomination shared with Ansgar Frerich, Eva Kemme, and Tobias N. Siebert
92nd	2019	Feras Fayyad	(Syria)	The Cave	Nominated	Nomination shared with Kirstine Barfod and Sigrid Dyekjær
92nd	2019	Waad Al-Kateab	(Syria)	For Sama	Nominated	Nomination shared with Edward Watts
97th	2024	Basel Adra; Hamdan Ballal	(Palestine)	No Other Land	Won	Nomination shared with Rachel Szor and Yuval Abraham

== Best Documentary (Short Subject) ==
Academy Award for Best Documentary (Short Subject)
Ceremony	Year	Name	Country	Film	Status	Notes
84th	2011	Sharmeen Obaid-Chinoy	(Pakistan) / (Canada)	Saving Face	Won	First Pakistani to be nominated for – and to win – an Academy Award in any category; Award shared with Daniel Junge
86th	2013	Sara Ishaq	(Scotland) / (Yemen)	Karama Has No Walls	Nominated	
88th	2015	Sharmeen Obaid-Chinoy	(Pakistan) / (Canada)	A Girl in the River: The Price of Forgiveness	Won	First Muslim to win two Academy Awards; First female to win Best Documentary (Short Subject) twice

== Best Live Action Short Film ==
Academy Award for Best Live Action Short Film
Ceremony	Year	Name	Country	Film	Status	Notes
33rd	1960	Ismail Merchant	(India)	The Creation of Woman	Nominated	Nomination shared with Charles F. Schwep
72nd	1999	Mehdi Norowzian	(Iran) / (United Kingdom)	Killing Joe	Nominated	Nomination shared with Steve Wax
74th	2001	Shameela Bakhsh	(United States)	Speed for Thespians	Nominated	Nomination shared with Kalman Apple
75th	2002	Lexi Alexander	(Germany) / (Palestine)	Johnny Flynton	Nominated	Muslim father; Nomination shared with Alexander Buono
87th	2014	Talkhon Hamzavi	(Iran)	Parvaneh	Nominated	Nomination shared with Stefan Eichenberger
92nd	2019	Meryam Joobeur	(Tunisia) / (Canada)	Brotherhood	Nominated	Nomination shared with Marcia Gracia Turgeon
94th	2021	Riz Ahmed	(Pakistan) / (United Kingdom)	The Long Goodbye	Won	Nominated shared with Aneil Karia

== Best Original Score ==
Academy Award for Best Original Score
Ceremony	Year	Name	Country	Film	Status	Notes
81st	2008	A. R. Rahman	(India)	Slumdog Millionaire	Won	First Indian to be nominated for – and to win – Best Original Score
83rd	2010	A. R. Rahman	(India)	127 Hours	Nominated	First Asian to be nominated for Best Original Score twice

== Best Original Song ==
Academy Award for Best Original Song
Ceremony	Year	Name	Country	Film – Song	Status	Notes
81st	2008	A. R. Rahman	(India)	Slumdog Millionaire – "Jai Ho"	Won	Award shared with Gulzar; First Asian – along with Gulzar – to win Best Original Song; First Asian to be nominated for three Academy Awards in the same year; First Asian to win two Academy Awards in the same year
81st	2008	A. R. Rahman	(India)	Slumdog Millionaire – "O... Saya"	Nominated	Nomination shared with Mathangi "M.I.A." Arulpragasam; First Asian to be nominated for three Academy Awards in the same year
83rd	2010	A. R. Rahman	(India)	127 Hours – "If I Rise"	Nominated	Nomination shared with Rollo Armstrong and Dido
91st	2018	SZA	(United States)	Black Panther – "All the Stars"	Nominated	Nomination shared with Kendrick Lamar, Mark "Sounwave" Spears and Anthony "Top Dawg" Tiffith

== Best Picture ==
Academy Award for Best Picture
Ceremony	Year	Name	Country	Film	Status	Notes
59th	1986	Ismail Merchant	(India)	A Room with a View	Nominated	
65th	1992	Ismail Merchant	(India)	Howards End	Nominated	
66th	1993	Ismail Merchant	(India)	The Remains of the Day	Nominated	Nomination shared with John Calley and Mike Nichols

== Best Sound ==
Academy Award for Best Sound
Ceremony	Year	Name	Country	Film	Status	Notes
79th	2006	Kami Asgar	(Iran)	Apocalypto	Nominated	First – and only – Middle Eastern to be nominated for Best Sound
81st	2009	Resul Pookutty	(India)	Slumdog Millionaire	Won	First Indian to win Oscar in this category.

== Best Visual Effects ==
Academy Award for Best Visual Effects
Ceremony	Year	Name	Country	Film	Status	Notes
69th	1996	Habib Zargarpour	(Iran)	Twister	Nominated	Nomination shared with Stefan Fangmeier, John Frazier, and Henry LaBounta
73rd	2000	Habib Zargarpour	(Iran)	The Perfect Storm	Nominated	Nomination shared with Walt Conti, Stefan Fangmeier, and John Frazier

== Best Writing (Adapted Screenplay) ==
Academy Award for Best Writing (Adapted Screenplay)
Ceremony	Year	Name	Country	Film	Status	Notes
8th	1935	Achmed Abdullah	(United States)	The Lives of a Bengal Lancer	Nominated	Adapted from the autobiography of the same name by Francis Yeats-Brown; First Muslim to be nominated for an Academy Award in any category; Nomination shared with John L. Balderston, Grover Jones, William Slavens McNutt, and Waldemar Young
70th	1997	Hossein Amini	(Iran) / (United Kingdom)	The Wings of the Dove	Nominated	Adapted from the novel of the same name by Henry James; First Asian to be nominated for Best Writing (Adapted Screenplay)

== Best Writing (Original Screenplay) ==
Academy Award for Best Writing (Original Screenplay)
Ceremony	Year	Name	Country	Film	Status	Notes
84th	2011	Asghar Farhadi	(Iran)	A Separation	Nominated	First screenplay written entirely in Persian to be nominated for an Academy Award in a writing category
90th	2017	Kumail Nanjiani	(Pakistan) / (United States)	The Big Sick	Nominated	Nomination shared with Emily V. Gordon (his wife)
98th	2025	Jafar Panahi; Shadmehr Rastin; Nader Saïvar; Mehdi Mahmoudian	(Iran)	It Was Just an Accident	Nominated	

== See also ==
- List of Academy Award records
- List of Jewish Academy Award winners and nominees
