= Some People With Jokes =

- Genre: Comedy
- Based on: Old Jews Telling Jokes
- Country of origin: United Kingdom
- No. of seasons: 2
- No. of episodes: 10

Production
- Producer: Mark Lucey (series producer)
- Editor: Chris Polding

Original release
- Release: 2013 – 2014

Some People With Jokes is a BBC Four comedy series where members of the public tell jokes, first broadcast in 2013 and 2014. The programme is billed with a different title for each episode. It is based on the format of the earlier BBC Four series Old Jews Telling Jokes,

== Episodes ==
The episodes are:

- Series 1: Some Vicars With Jokes (two episodes); Some Boffins With Jokes; Some Scousers With Jokes (two episodes).
- Series 2: Some Football Managers With Jokes; Some Irish People With Jokes; Some Funeral Directors with Jokes; Some Dog Owners with Jokes.
- Christmas Special: Some Santas With Jokes.
