= Sam Hoffman =

American film director

Sam Hoffman is a producer, director and writer who has created content in film, television and on digital media. Hoffman wrote and directed the film Humor Me, starring Jemaine Clement, Elliott Gould and Ingrid Michaelson. The film premiered at the Los Angeles Film Festival.

== Career ==
Hoffman is currently Executive Producing and directing Cupertino, created by Robert and Michelle King, for CBS Studios. He recently finished EPing Furious, created by Elizabeth Meriwether and starring Emmy Rossum for Hulu. Both will air in the late summer/fall of 2026.

Hoffman’s directed season 2 episode 12, "Foiled Again", of the hit CBS Studios show Elsbeth aired on February 20, 2024.

He Executive Produced Seasons 3 and 4 of the Paramount+ supernatural drama Evil, serving as Directing Producer on Season 4 as well as directing multiple episodes.

His first feature film as writer/director, Humor Me, starring Jemaine Clement, Elliott Gould, and Ingrid Michaelson, premiered at the Los Angeles Film Festival on June 16, 2017. It was released theatrically in January 2018 and is currently available on VOD and DVD/Blu-ray.

He produced all and directed many of the episodes of the hit CBS Studios drama Madam Secretary, which ran six seasons.

Hoffman created the web series Old Jews Telling Jokes, which has been viewed over 50 million times, released on DVD, and broadcast on the BBC. His book, based on the series, is now in its sixth printing and the off-Broadway play derived from the series currently tours throughout North America.

Feature films he has produced include Wes Anderson's Moonrise Kingdom, John Carney (director)'s Begin Again and Richard Loncraine's 5 Flights Up. Earlier in his career, Hoffman also assistant directed such titles as: The Royal Tenenbaums, School of Rock, Donnie Brasco, Dead Man Walking and Groundhog Day.

== Filmography ==
Year	Title	Director	Writer	Producer
2025	Elsbeth (TV series)	Yes	No	No
2022-2024	Evil (American TV series)	Yes	No	Yes
2021	Ways and Means	No	No	Yes
2018	Humor Me	Yes	Yes	Yes
2014–2018	Madam Secretary	Yes	No	No
2014	5 Flights Up	No	No	Yes
2013	Begin Again (film)	No	No	Yes
2012	Moonrise Kingdom	No	No	Yes
2011	The Oranges	No	No	Yes
2010	Every Day (2010 film)	No	No	Yes
2009	Old Jews Telling Jokes	Yes	No	No
2007	The Darjeeling Limited	No	No	Yes
2006	Wedding Daze	No	No	Yes
2000	The Ride Home	Yes	Yes	No

Executive producer

- Evil (2022–2024)
- Ways and Means (2020–2021)
- Madam Secretary (2014–2019)
- Old Jews Telling Jokes
- 5 Flights Up (2014)
- Begin Again (2013)
- Moonrise Kingdom (2012)
- The Oranges (2011)
- Everyday (2011)

UPM

- Madam Secretary (2014–2018)
- 5 Flights Up (2014)
- Begin Again (2013)
- Moonrise Kingdom (2012)
- The Oranges (2011)
- Tenderness (2009)

Co-Producer

- Tenderness (2009)

Line Producer

- The Darjeeling Limited (2007) (New York unit)

Second Unit Director

- The Oranges (2011)
- Everyday (2010)
- Tenderness (2009)
- Wedding Daze (2006)
- Porn 'n Chicken (2002)

First Assistant Director

- Hanna (2011) (New York unit)
- Everyday (2010)
- The Producers (2005)
- The Life Aquatic with Steve Zissou (2004)
- School of Rock (2003)
- Porn 'n Chicken (2002)
- The Royal Tenenbaums (2001)
- Dinner with Friends (2001) (New York unit)
- The Curse of the Jade Scorpion (2001)
- The Shaft (2001) (New York unit)
- Center Stage (2000)
- Joe Gould's Secret (2000)
- Earthly Possessions (1999)
- The Invisible Man (1998)
- One True Thing (1998)

Second Assistant Director

- Donnie Brasco (1997)
- Sleepers (1996)
- Dead Man Walking (1995)
- Now and Then (1995)
- New York Undercover (1995) (3 episodes)
- Law & Order (1993–1994) (3 episodes)
- Carlito's Way (1993)
- Rudy (1993)
- Groundhog Day (1993)
- A League of Their Own (1992)

Production assistant

- Basic Instinct (1992)
- Bed & Breakfast (1991)
- Regarding Henry (1991) (Uncredited)
- True Colors (1991)
- Awakenings (1990)
- She-Devil (1989)
