= Humor Me (film) =

- Theatrical release poster
- Directed by: Sam Hoffman
- Written by: Sam Hoffman
- Produced by: Jamie Gordon; Sam Hoffman; Courtney Potts
- Starring: Jemaine Clement; Elliott Gould; Ingrid Michaelson; Annie Potts; Priscilla Lopez; Bebe Neuwirth; Maria Dizzia
- Cinematography: Seamus Tierney
- Edited by: Paul Frank
- Music by: Gabriel Mann
- Production companies: Fugitive Films; Spitting Cobra Films
- Distributed by: Shout! Studios
- Release dates: June 16, 2017 (Los Angeles Film Festival); January 12, 2018 (United States)
- Running time: 93 minutes
- Country: United States
- Language: English
- Box office: $40,099

Humor Me is a 2017 American comedy film written and directed by Sam Hoffman. The film stars Jemaine Clement, Elliott Gould, Ingrid Michaelson, Annie Potts, Priscilla Lopez, Bebe Neuwirth and Maria Dizzia. The film was released on January 12, 2018, by Shout! Studios.

== Plot ==
Nate Kroll is a playwright who suddenly loses his job, wife Nirit and home. With no other options, he moves in with his eccentric father, Bob, who lives in a retired people's community.

After barely settling in, only 24 hours there, Nate's dad gets him a job at the home in the laundry. Soon after being hired to fold towels, his retired military boss Ellis fires him. Wandering through a community area, Nate comes across The Cranberry Bog Players, a small group of residents planning to put on The Mikado.

Bob's girlfriend Connie, sharing a spliff with Nate, explains she started using to combat the effects of chemo. She met Bob when he was doing his weekly volunteering at the cancer ward. It was probably a habit he picked up from when he was visiting his wife, who didn't survive breast cancer. She proposes Nate help direct the play.

At the preliminary meeting, four women are present, none too sold on, or interested in the chosen work. Dee is one of the residents, and her daughter Allison, lives there, out-of-place, like Nate. She is complimentary of his work, and invites him to dinner at her mom's. He finds out she's there after detoxing in rehab, she's a musician and is thinking of moving to Seattle, far from New Jersey, to teach music.

Helen, one of the Players, takes an interest in Nate. He skillfully dodges her, pointing out Ellis's interest. Leaving her place on a Vespa, Ellis takes chase on a golf cart. On the way, Nate picks up Allison and they give him the slip. He has managed to convince Helen to give Ellis a chance, which he is grateful for.

Time goes on, Nate starts going with his dad power-walking, he gives his latest manuscript to Allison to proof and the play rehearsals progress. He has nightly Skype calls with his son Gabe in France, and finally gets some dental work done.

The Cranberry Bog Players, upon finding a video of Nate's successful screenplay, have a viewing at Bob's. It is basically the story of his parents dealing with her cancer. Bob angrily shuts it off, shortly needing to be rushed to the hospital. While waiting for him to wake from a coma, Connie hands Nate the key to a storage locker full of his mom's things.

Seeing Nate that night at his dad's, Allison confronts him about quitting. Telling him the new screenplay is good, although unfinished, she accuses him of being the reason why it is incomplete.

At the hospital, Nate and Connie take turns telling jokes to Bob, and can see he's reacting to them. He slowly comes out of the coma. Returning to the home, Nate asks if he may come back, making adjustments. At the performance, we see that clever slapstick jokes with sexual innuendo have been added to the routine. The producer who pulled out of his last play praises the performance. And his soon-to-be-ex also has come, bringing Gabe. She's made money in France, says she'll get divorce papers written up with joint custody, and he introduces his son to Allison.

The close starts with a playbill of the opening of Nate's recently opened show. Then we see the home, first from Gabe finishing a piano lesson with Allison, then they walk by ladies in dress rehearsal for a new performance, Ellis is with his lady, and they go through the changing area to reach the pool. Bob, Nate and Gabe cannonball into it.

== Cast ==
- Jemaine Clement as Nate Kroll
- Elliott Gould as Bob Kroll
- Ingrid Michaelson as Allison
- Annie Potts as Dee
- Priscilla Lopez as Connie Andrews
- Bebe Neuwirth as C.C. Rudin
- Maria Dizzia as Nirit Gerb-Kroll
- Joey Slotnick as Zimmerman
- Willie C. Carpenter as Ellis
- Le Clanché du Rand as Helen
- Rosemary Prinz as Gert
- Erich Bergen as Randy Kroll
- Cade Lappin as Gabe Kroll
- Ray Iannicelli as Marv
- Mike Hodge as Alan
- Malachy McCourt as David
- Tibor Feldman as Ed
- Bernie McInerney as Doctor

== Release ==
The film premiered at the Los Angeles Film Festival on June 16, 2017. The film was released on January 12, 2018, by Shout! Studios.

=== Critical reception ===
On review aggregator website Rotten Tomatoes, the film holds an approval rating of 70% based on 20 reviews, and an average rating of 4.87/10. On Metacritic, the film has a weighted average score of 53 out of 100, based on 9 critics, indicating "mixed or average" reviews.
