= Furious (TV series) =

2026 American crime drama series

- Genre: Crime drama; Thriller
- Created by: Elizabeth Meriwether
- Inspired by: Black Widow by Ronald Bass
- Starring: Emmy Rossum; Lola Petticrew; Quincy Tyler Bernstine; Scoot McNairy
- Music by: Ariel Marx
- Country of origin: United States
- Original language: English
- No. of seasons: 1
- No. of episodes: 8

Production
- Executive producers: Elizabeth Meriwether; Emmy Rossum; Ronald Bass; Brian Kirk; Matt Olmstead; Sam Hoffman
- Producers: Fran Giblin; Robyn-Alain Feldman; Matthew Shapiro; Steve Welch
- Cinematography: Doug Emmett; Brian Lannin
- Editors: Ralph Jean-Pierre; Steve Welch; Katie Ennis; Julie Kreinik
- Running time: 50–55 minutes
- Production companies: Elizabeth Meriwether Pictures; Composition 8; Searchlight Television; 20th Television

Original release
- Network: Hulu
- Release: July 27, 2026 – present

Furious is an American crime drama television series created by Elizabeth Meriwether and loosely inspired by the 1987 film Black Widow by Ronald Bass. Produced by 20th Television and Searchlight Television, the series stars Emmy Rossum as FBI agent Alice Black, alongside Lola Petticrew as a calculating serial killer Catherine Grace. The series also stars Quincy Tyler Bernstine and Scoot McNairy. It premiered on Hulu on July 27, 2026, and was renewed for a second season in August 2026.

The show was a commercial success and received widespread critical acclaim, with particular praise for Rossum and Petticrew's performances.

== Premise ==
Furious follows FBI agent Alice Black (Emmy Rossum) as she investigates Catherine Grace (Lola Petticrew), a calculating female serial killer targeting powerful men connected to a web of abuse. Both Alice and Catherine walk their own paths toward justice, and as their lives start to intertwine, the line between right and wrong begins to blur.

== Cast and characters ==
=== Main ===
- Emmy Rossum as Alice Black, an FBI agent and former NYPD homicide detective
- Lola Petticrew as Catherine Grace, a survivor of sex trafficking-turned-serial killer who kills wealthy men using lethal doses of fentanyl
- Quincy Tyler Bernstine as Nora Washington, the head of the FBI's sex crimes unit
- Scoot McNairy as Danny Kelly, Alice's friend and former NYPD partner

=== Recurring ===
- Jake Lacy as Marshall Connelly, a corrupt NYPD detective and Alice's abusive ex-boyfriend
- Rob Yang as Frank Choi, an FBI agent
- Steve Way as Alden, a home-healthcare aide's client
- Hope Davis as Emma Easton
- Danny McCarthy as ASAC Ed George
- Peter McRobbie as Jay Easton

=== Guest ===
- Rob Delaney as Oliver Charles, a lawyer
- Chloe Troast as Becky
- Campbell Scott as Hal Hartford, Emma's lawyer and Blanchard's father
- Constance Shulman as Mrs. Connelly, Marshall's mother
- Marcia DeBonis as Jean
- Elise Kibler as Amy, Alice's sister
- Chloe Carrillo as Elena
- Riley Vinson as Mira, Oliver's teenage daughter
- Nicholas Podany as Blanchard, a man Catherine went on a date with to get close to his father Hal
- Janel Moloney as Raquel, Hal Hatford's wife and Blanchard's mother

== Production ==
Release poster

=== Development ===
In March 2025, Hulu ordered a series from Elizabeth Meriwether starring Emmy Rossum loosely inspired by the 1987 film Black Widow. Meriwether executive produces alongside Rossum, Brian Kirk who also directed the first two episodes, Sam Hoffman, Matt Olmstead, and Ronald Bass who wrote the 1987 film. In October 2025, it was announced that the series was officially given the title Furious.

In August 2026, the series was renewed for a second season.

=== Casting ===
In June 2025, Lola Petticrew and Scoot McNairy joined the series as series regulars. In July 2025, Quincy Tyler Bernstine was cast as a series regular. Jake Lacy joined the cast in a recurring role as Marshall in October 2025.

== Episodes ==
No.	Title	Directed by	Written by	Original release date	Prod. code
1	"The Gorgon"	Brian Kirk	Elizabeth Meriwether	July 27, 2026	1KJR01
On Halloween in New York City, the mysterious Catherine murders wealthy Caleb Easton in his apartment, staging his death as a fentanyl overdose. Robbing Jinny Allen, Catherine assumes her identity to stay at a women's shelter. She manipulates shelter employee Becky to acquire a new ID, enabling "Jinny" to be hired by a catering company and seduce her next target, high-powered lawyer Oliver Charles. Meanwhile, low-level FBI agent Alice Black is called to Caleb's apartment by homicide detective Danny, her former NYPD partner. Deducing that Caleb was murdered, Alice arranges her own violent sexual encounter with a stranger. She links Caleb's murder to the similar death of sex trafficker Adrian Murado, and enlists the reluctant help of Nora, head of the FBI sex crimes unit. Caleb's neighbor remembers Catherine's tattoo, which Alice later spots in surveillance footage of a trafficked girl, Catherine, trying to escape Adrian fourteen years earlier, confirming her suspicion that the two men were victims of the same killer.
2	"My Life Had Stood – A Loaded Gun"	Brian Kirk	Elizabeth Meriwether	July 27, 2026	1KJR02
Despite having gone to Nora behind her superior's back, Alice is allowed to pursue her theory that the victims are connected to a raid that implicated Adrian. Her suggestion that Caleb was involved with underage prostitutes derails an interview with his sister Emma, and Alice struggles to connect with her own sister Amy. Alice crosses paths with her abusive ex-boyfriend Marshall, Danny's fellow detective; she left the NYPD after her requests for help were ignored, and she and Danny were ostracized. After Amy reveals that her sister avoids bathing due to Marshall's abuse, Danny helps Alice feel safe enough to shower. Staying in Oliver's apartment, Catherine blackmails Becky for supplies, including her confiscated fentanyl. She subdues Oliver, but his teenage daughter Mira arrives unexpectedly. Bonding with Mira, Catherine fatally injects Oliver as revenge for paying for sex with her when she was 15. She reveals the truth to Mira, who is found traumatized by her father's body after defiantly cutting off her hair.
3	"Memory Distortion"	Karena Evans	Alexa Derman	July 27, 2026	1KJR03
Alice is forced to work with Marshall, the lead investigator on Oliver's murder, and partnered with agent Frank Choi. Tracing "Jinny" to the shelter, they discover Catherine killed Becky to cover her tracks. Mira recalls that Catherine lost the feeling in her fingertips from a teenage injury, and provides an old photo of Oliver, Caleb, and Caleb's billionaire father Jay with Catherine and her fellow trafficked friend Isabel. Marshall attempts to reconcile with Alice, inviting her to reconnect with his terminally ill mother. Realizing they are only trying to protect his career, Alice draws her gun on a threatening Marshall. Catherine has stolen Mira's backpack, and returns to her life as "Vanessa", a home care aide. Sharing a close bond with her client Alden, she stays in his home with access to his prescription fentanyl, earning money as a webcam model. She is unable to rescue the murdered Isabel's sister Elena from being trafficked, but gives her Mira's backpack. Targeting her next victim, Catherine vows to find Isabel's killer.
4	"Flash Flood"	Karena Evans	Haily Hall	August 3, 2026	1KJR04
Shaken by her confrontation with Marshall, Alice enjoys another violent tryst. Nora conceals from Alice that she encountered Isabel years earlier as an unidentified murder victim, and confronts her former supervisor, Ed George, on Isabel's case, but he threatens to expose her alcoholism. Alice and Danny reveal the photo to Emma and her family attorney, Hal, and learn Catherine's real name from the group home where she and Isabel lived. Alice reveals she briefly stayed in a similar home, while the recently divorced Danny is struggling to afford residential care for his son. Marshall tells his version of Alice's altercation to Nora, who pulls her off the investigation just as Alice discovers Nora's previous connection to Isabel's case. Posing as "Marta", Catherine seduces Hal's son Blanchard, who lives with his parents. Refusing to leave their home, Catherine confronts and drugs Hal, abducting him in his own car. She returns home to Alden, who asks her to be his girlfriend. An emotional Catherine accepts, while the captive Hal wakes up.
5	"Pick a Sticker"	Destiny Ekaragha	Dan LeFranc	August 10, 2026	1KJR05
With Alice sidelined in her official capacity, she privately continues investigating Isabel’s 2012 murder and begins to suspect that Nora was pressured by her superior, Ed George, to abandon the case. Alice also turns the tables on her abusive ex, Marshall, engineering his arrest after he threatened her investigation. Meanwhile, Catherine interrogates Easton family lawyer Hal, learning that he secretly collected evidence of Jay Easton’s crimes but failed to intervene. Furious at his complicity, she kills him. Alice ultimately discovers that Isabel’s mysterious bracelet came from a safe-surrender program, revealing that Isabel had given birth. Her search leads her to a survivors’ shelter.
6	"They Make a Noise Like Feathers"	Destiny Ekaragha	Colleen McGuinness	August 17, 2026	1KJR06
Alice encounters Catherine at the survivors’ shelter and, under Nora’s direction, assumes a false identity in an attempt to gain her trust. The two unexpectedly connect over their histories of abuse before Catherine discovers Alice’s deception. Meanwhile, Nora confronts Ed over his role in suppressing the original investigation into Isabel’s death, exposing his connection to Jay Easton. Catherine reveals that her ultimate goal involves not only Easton and Isabel’s killer, but also Isabel’s daughter, Elena. After realizing Alice is affiliated with law enforcement, Catherine incapacitates Alice with a drugged syringe. As an overdosing Alice pursues Catherine out of the shelter, Alice is violently grabbed by Marshall, who had been drinking heavily in a car outside the shelter. Catherine intervenes and shoots him before running from the scene. After interrogating Alden, Danny retrieves a USB flash drive containing the videos presumably compiled by Hal as evidence of Jay Easton's crimes, including one labeled "Alice".
7	"Some Days It Don't Come Easy"	Cory Finley	Beatrice Morgan	August 24, 2026	1KJR07
Alice survives her overdose and learns that Marshall also survived, while Ed wrests control of the Catherine investigation from Nora and attempts to shut down the inquiry into Easton. After discovering that Easton’s secret archive contains footage of a teenage Alice being sexually exploited, Danny chooses to protect her rather than surrender the evidence, and he has an emotional conversation with Alice. Ed confronts Danny after realizing Danny took something from Alden's chair (the flash drive), and insinuates that it will be in Danny's best interest to turn over the drive. Alice and Nora track down Isabel’s daughter Elena, which leads Alice back to Catherine. Rather than arrest her, Alice deliberately lets Catherine travel to Easton’s mansion, planning to follow and use Catherine’s presence there as grounds to search the property. Meanwhile, evidence increasingly points toward the Easton family (and potentially Ed himself) as being involved in the abuse and cover-up. The episode ends with Catherine arriving at Easton’s home.
8	"Hart Island"	Cory Finley	Elizabeth Meriwether	August 31, 2026	1KJR08
Alice follows Catherine to Jay Easton’s estate, where Catherine finally uncovers the full truth about Isabel’s death from Jay's daughter Emma. After Jay left Isabel gravely injured, Isabel asked Catherine to end her suffering, and Catherine gave her a fatal dose of heroin, events that Catherine had suppressed. Alice arrives on the scene and arrests Catherine before she can kill Easton or be killed by the police force. Alice goes upstairs, where a bedridden Jay reveals that he remembers the video documenting Alice’s childhood abuse. As Alice watches, Jay's heart stops and he dies. In the aftermath, Catherine accepts responsibility for her crimes and is sent to prison. Marshall receives a commendation for his retconned role in the operation, and Danny leaves the force. Alice and Danny finally acknowledge their feelings for one another. Alice visits Catherine in prison, where Catherine correctly deduces that Alice was responsible for Jay's death, surreptitiously placing her foot on Jay's breathing tubes while feigning concern. Catherine reveals that she married (presumably Alden). Back at the FBI, Nora instructs Alice to watch the videos Danny retrieved from Alden, and Alice discovers that the video of her abuse was downloaded tens of thousands of times by identified users.

== Release ==
Furious premiered on Hulu on July 27, 2026, with the first three episodes, followed by one new episode weekly through August 31. Internationally, the series was made available for streaming on Disney+.

== Reception ==
=== Viewership ===
Nielsen Media Research, which records streaming viewership on U.S. television screens, reported that Furious recorded 372 million minutes of watch time from July 27 to August 2, ranking as the tenth most-streamed original series that week. Luminate, which measures streaming performance in the United States using viewership data, audience engagement metrics, and content reach across multiple platforms, announced that the series premiered with three episodes and subsequently ranked No. 5 in Luminate's weekly rankings during its first full week of release, recording 2.43 million U.S. views. Furious was reported to be the most-watched series on Disney+ and Hulu worldwide in August and the second most-watched new drama on Hulu in the United States year to date, with 4 billion cross-media impressions. Approximately five weeks after its debut, Furious had accumulated 43 million hours of viewing time, equivalent to an estimated 6.2 million views based on the series' runtime.

=== Critical response ===
On review aggregator website Rotten Tomatoes, the first season holds an approval rating of 99% based on 68 reviews, with an average of rated reviews of 8.5/10. The website's critics consensus reads, "A tense thrill ride spearheaded by a blazing Emmy Rossum, this striking crime drama serves its stars and audiences Furious justice." Metacritic, which uses a weighted average, assigned a score of 81 out of 100 based on 22 critic reviews, indicating universal acclaim.
