= Sahar Jahani =

American screenwriter

- Occupation: screenwriter

Sahar Jahani is an American writer, known for working on several popular television series, including 13 Reasons Why, and Ramy. In 2020 she was hired to write an adaptation of Uzma Jalaluddin's novel Hana Khan Carries On for Pascal Pictures.

== Educational career ==
Jahani graduated from film studies at the University of California, Irvine, in 2013. In 2019, as a successful alumnus, she was invited to join a panel on the changing landscape of film/television creation and distribution at Zotfest, the school's student film festival.

== Film career ==
In February 2019 Jahani was a founding member of Muslim Women in Film & Television.

=== Filmography ===
Sahar Jahani's filmography
| title | role | year | notes |
|---|---|---|---|
| Grey Matter | director | 2017 | Earned her the 2017 Islamic Scholarship Fund Film Grant. |
| Ramy | screenwriter | 2019 | A comedy series about Muslim-Americans, broadcast on Hulu. |
| 13 Reasons Why | screenwriter | 2019 | A series revolving around teens struggling with the surprising suicide of a peer. |
| Just One Night | director | 2019 | A short film that premiered at the Bentonville Film Festival in 2019. |
