= Maytha Alhassen =

Syrian-American journalist

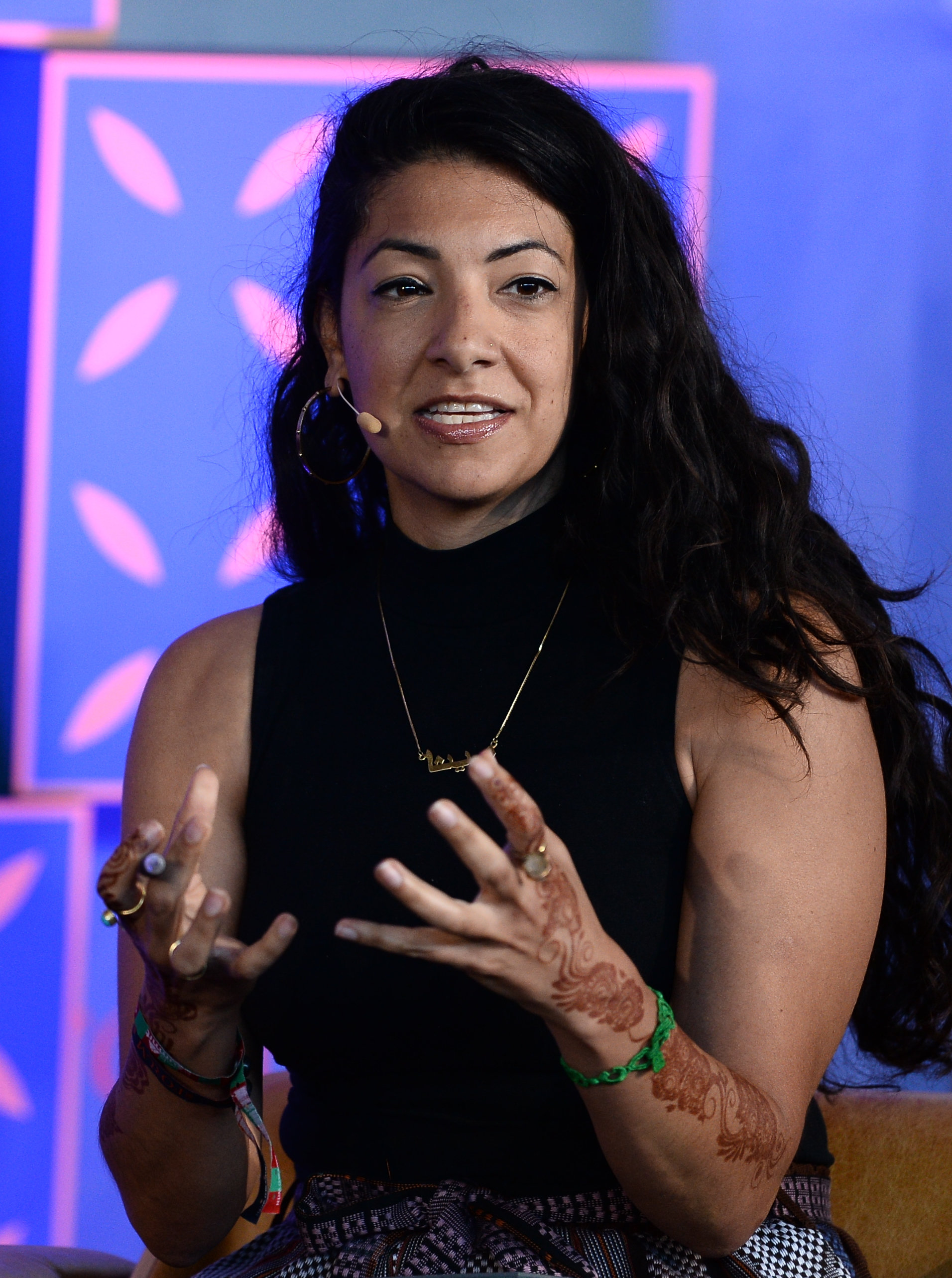
- Photo by Nikita Hamilton, 2021
- Education: UCLA (B.A.); Columbia University (M.A.); University of Southern California (Ph.D.)
- Occupations: Journalist, television journalist, television producer, professor
- Website: www.maythaalhassen.com

Maytha Alhassen is a Syrian-American journalist who appears regularly as a guest co-host and digital producer on the English-language television current-events program The Stream on Al Jazeera. Alhassen has appeared on CNN, HuffPost Live, Fusion Network, The Young Turks, and WNYC's The Brian Lehrer Show. Along with Ahmed Shihab-Eldin, Alhassen is the editor of Demanding Dignity: Young Voices from the Front Lines of the Arab Revolutions, published in 2012.

Alhassen has also written for CNN, Huffington Post, Mic and Counterpunch. In addition, she appeared at South by Southwest in 2012. Previously, Alhassen co-hosted an Arab-American TV variety show called What's Happening.

Alhassen received her doctorate at the University of Southern California Dornsife's Department of American Studies and Ethnicity. As a pioneer in the Afro-Arab solidarity movement, Alhassen published her dissertation "To Tell What the Eye Beholds: A Post 1945 Transnational History of Afro-Arab 'Solidarity Politics'" in 2017. She received her bachelor's degree in political science and Arabic and Islamic studies from the UCLA in 2004 and her master's degree in anthropology from Columbia University in 2008. While at Columbia, Alhassen conducted research for the university's Malcolm X Project. One of her works is titled "The 'Three Circles' Construction" and attempts to observe Black Islam in the Atlantic world by referencing the works and ideas of Malcolm X.
