= Swan Song (2021 Benjamin Cleary film) =

- Release poster
- Directed by: Benjamin Cleary
- Written by: Benjamin Cleary
- Produced by: Mahershala Ali; Rebecca Bourke; Jonathan King; Jacob Perlin; Adam Shulman; Mimi Valdés
- Starring: Mahershala Ali; Naomie Harris; Awkwafina; Glenn Close
- Cinematography: Masanobu Takayanagi
- Edited by: Nathan Nugent
- Music by: Jay Wadley
- Production companies: Apple Studios; Anonymous Content; Know Wonder; Concordia Studio
- Distributed by: Apple TV+
- Release date: December 17, 2021
- Running time: 112 minutes
- Country: United States
- Language: English

Swan Song is a 2021 American science fiction romantic drama film written and directed by Benjamin Cleary. The film stars Mahershala Ali, Naomie Harris, Awkwafina, Glenn Close, and Adam Beach.

Swan Song was released in select theaters and on Apple TV+ on December 17, 2021. The film received generally positive reviews from critics.

== Plot ==
When loving husband and father Cameron Turner is diagnosed with a terminal illness, he is presented with the option of sparing his family grief by having him replaced with a clone. Turner is torn about whether to discuss the option with his wife.

== Cast ==
- Mahershala Ali as Cameron Turner, a family man suffering from a terminal illness.
  - Ali also portrays Jack, Cameron's clone.
- Naomie Harris as Poppy Turner, Cameron's wife.
- Awkwafina as Kate, a previously cloned human.
- Glenn Close as Dr. Scott, the brash director of human cloning.
- Adam Beach as Dalton
- Lee Shorten as Rafa
- Dax Rey as Cory, Cameron and Poppy's son (age 8)

== Production ==
In February 2020, Apple TV+ announced it had acquired the rights to the film, to be written and directed by Benjamin Cleary and star Mahershala Ali. In September, Naomie Harris joined the cast, and Awkwafina and Glenn Close signed on in November. Adam Beach announced he was added to the cast in December.

Principal photography began on November 9, 2020 in Vancouver, Canada and concluded on February 6, 2021. The film was released on December 17, 2021.

== Reception ==
=== Critical response ===
On the review aggregator website Rotten Tomatoes, 80% of 100 critics' reviews are positive, with an average rating of 6.6/10. The website's consensus reads: "Swan Song occasionally strays on the wrong side of maudlin, but Mahershala Ali's work in dual roles lends this sci-fi drama genuine heart." On Metacritic, the film has a weighted average score of 66 out of 100, based on 27 critics, indicating "generally favorable reviews".

=== Accolades ===
Ceremony	Category	Recipient(s)/Nominee(s)	Results	Ref.
22nd Black Reel Awards	Outstanding Actor	Mahershala Ali	Nominated	
75th British Academy Film Awards	Best Actor in a Leading Role	Mahershala Ali	Nominated	
2nd Critics' Choice Super Awards	Best Actor in a Science Fiction/Fantasy Movie	Mahershala Ali	Nominated	
2nd Critics' Choice Super Awards	Best Science Fiction/Fantasy Movie	—N/a	Nominated	
79th Golden Globe Awards	Best Actor in a Motion Picture – Drama	Mahershala Ali	Nominated	
18th Irish Film & Television Awards	Best Film	—N/a	Nominated	
18th Irish Film & Television Awards	Best Director	Benjamin Cleary	Nominated	
18th Irish Film & Television Awards	Best Script	Benjamin Cleary	Nominated	
18th Irish Film & Television Awards	Best Editing	Nathan Nugent	Nominated	
18th Irish Film & Television Awards	Best Sound	Steve Fanagan	Won	
18th Irish Film & Television Awards	Best VFX	Ed Bruce & Manuel Martinez	Nominated	
18th Irish Film & Television Awards	Rising Star	Benjamin Cleary	Nominated	
53rd NAACP Image Awards	Outstanding Actor in a Motion Picture	Mahershala Ali	Nominated	
