= Steve Way (actor) =

American actor and comedian (born 1990)

- Born: December 28, 1990 (age 35); New Jersey, U.S.
- Education: Montclair State University
- Occupations: Comedian; writer; actor; producer; speaker; disabilities advocate; substitute teacher
- Years active: 2011–present
- Website: thesteveway.com

Steve Way (born December 28, 1990) is an American actor and comedian. He is best known for his recurring role as Steve, a friend of the lead character Ramy Hassan on the Hulu series Ramy.

Way was born with muscular dystrophy and is an advocate for disability rights and universal health care and for actors with disabilities in Hollywood. Way also works as a high school substitute teacher.

An August 2020 article about Way mentioned that he is working with Apple TV+ to develop his own series.

== Filmography ==
Key
†	Denotes films that have not yet been released

=== Feature films ===
Year	Title	Role	Notes
2026	Take Me Home	Himself	

=== Television ===
Year	Title	Role	Notes
2014	Nepotism	Director	1 episode
2018	Projecting	Steve	1 episode
2019–22	Ramy	Steve	Recurring role
2020	ADA Lead On Honors National Disability Employment Awareness Month (NDEAM)	Himself	TV Special
2026	Furious	Alden	Recurring role

=== Documentaries ===
Year	Title	Role	Notes
2025	Disposable Humanity	—	Executive producer

=== Short films ===
Year	Title	Role	Notes
2015	Spanish God 101	Steve	Also writer
2018	No One Wants to Say Duck	Steve	
2021	Couples Therapy	Arnold	
2022	Act of God	Steve	
TBA	We'll Meet Again †	Steve	Also writer and producer
