= Old Jews Telling Jokes =

Web series and book by Sam Hoffman

- Author: Sam Hoffman
- Language: English
- Genre: Humor
- Publisher: Villard
- Publication date: 2010
- Publication place: United States
- ISBN: 978-0-345-52235-1

Old Jews Telling Jokes is a web series launched in 2009 created and directed by Sam Hoffman and produced by Eric Spiegelman and Tim Williams for Jetpack Media, Inc. It has since gone on to garner millions of unique views over several original series shot in places like New York, Los Angeles and Boca Raton.

In 2010 it was published as a paperback book by Villard. Written by Sam Hoffman with Eric Spiegelman, it is subtitled 5000 Years of Funny Bits and Not-So-Kosher Laughs." Its chapters consist of jokes and humorous anecdotes contributed by several Jewish personalities, including Ed Koch, Norman Stiles, John Pleshette and Annie Korzen. In the introduction Hoffman says his book "categorized the jokes into chapters, roughly tracing the trajectory of the Jewish experience in America".

In addition to the book, it has also been distributed on DVD, as two audio books (narrative and "the joke-off"), a successful BBC Four television series and was named one of the Top 5 podcasts on iTunes in 2010.

In 2011 it won an Audie Award for Humor.

In May 2012, it opened as an off-broadway play at the Westside Theater.

The BBC adapted the format for Some People With Jokes.
