= We Are the Dream: The Kids of the Oakland MLK Oratorical Fest =

Documentary film

- Directed by: Amy Schatz
- Country of origin: United States
- Original language: English

Production
- Running time: 58 minutes
- Production companies: HBO Documentary; Know Wonder

Original release
- Network: HBO
- Release: February 18, 2020

We Are the Dream: The Kids of the Oakland MLK Oratorical Fest is a HBO documentary film. The film features young people who participate in a public speaking competition honoring the legacy of Martin Luther King Jr. It tied with The Dark Crystal: Age of Resistance for the 2020 Primetime Emmy Award for Outstanding Children's Program.
