= List of actors with two or more Academy Awards in acting categories =

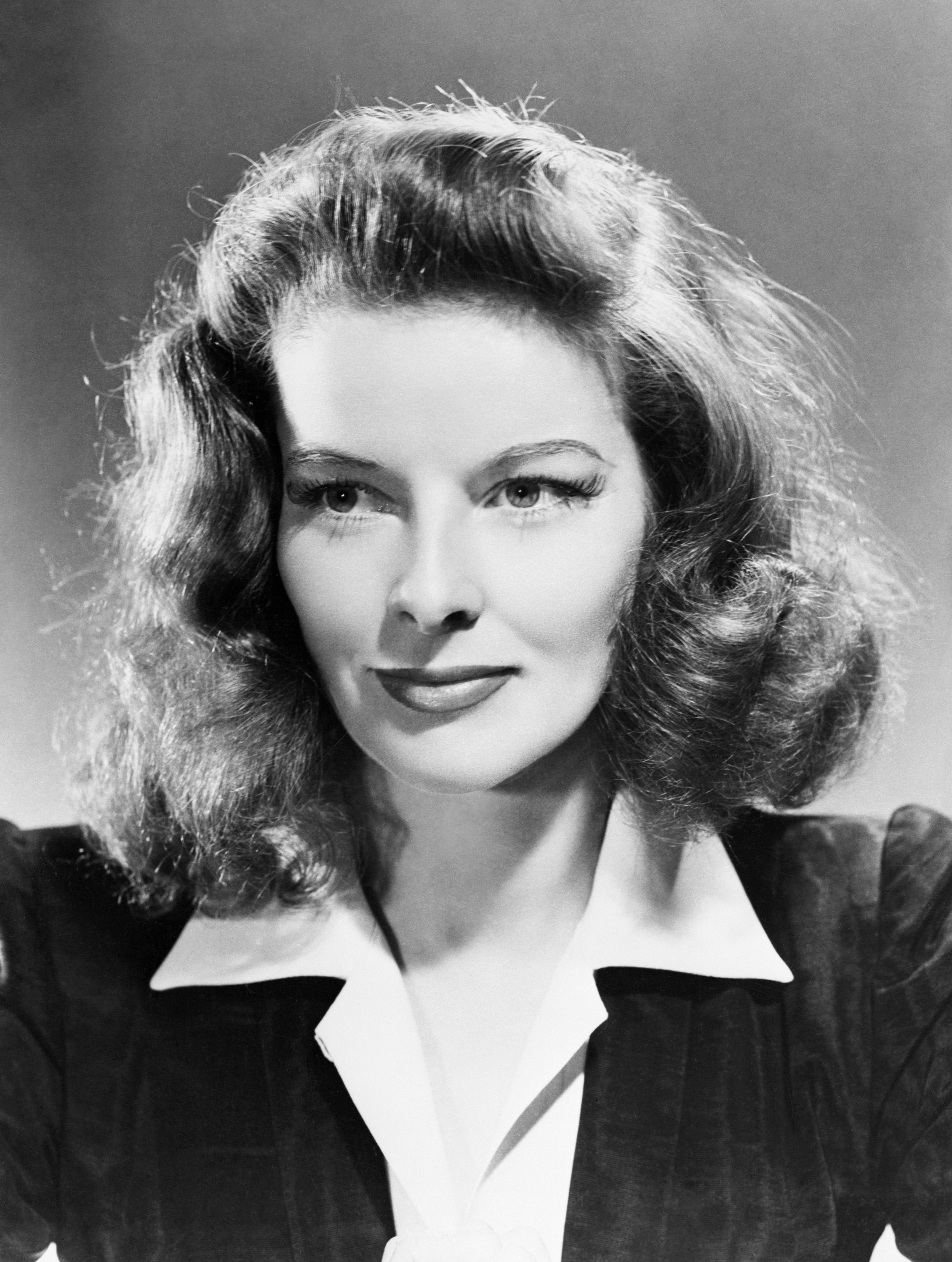
Katharine Hepburn won four Academy Awards (all for Best Actress), more than any other actor or actress in the history of the award.

The Academy of Motion Picture Arts and Sciences has given Academy Awards to actors and actresses for their performances in films since its inception. Throughout the history of the Academy Awards, there have been actors and actresses who have received multiple Academy Awards for Best Actor, Best Actress, Best Supporting Actor, or Best Supporting Actress. The only restriction is that actors cannot receive multiple nominations for the same performance. This rule was implemented after Barry Fitzgerald received a Best Actor and a Best Supporting Actor nomination for his performance in Going My Way.

As of 2026, 46 actors and actresses have received two or more Academy Awards in acting categories. Katharine Hepburn holds the record with four Oscars (all Best Actress). Seven have won exactly three acting Academy Awards: Daniel Day-Lewis (three Best Actor awards), Frances McDormand (three Best Actress awards), Meryl Streep (two Best Actress awards and one Best Supporting Actress award), Jack Nicholson (two Best Actor awards and one Best Supporting Actor award), Ingrid Bergman (two Best Actress awards and one Best Supporting Actress award), Sean Penn (two Best Actor awards and one Best Supporting Actor award), and Walter Brennan (three Best Supporting Actor awards). Brennan became the first to receive three or more Academy Awards (winning the third in 1940), followed by Hepburn (1968), Bergman (1974), Nicholson (1997), Streep (2011), Day-Lewis (2012), McDormand (2020) and, most recently, Penn (2025). Of the eight, Nicholson, Streep, Day-Lewis, McDormand, and Penn are still living. There have been five performers who have won an acting Oscar in two consecutive years: Luise Rainer (1936–37), Spencer Tracy (1937–38), Hepburn (1967–68), Jason Robards (1976–77), and Tom Hanks (1993–94).

There have been fourteen actors/actresses cumulatively (seven each) who have won at least one Academy Award for a leading performance and another for a supporting performance, in various sequences. While there is no restriction on a performer winning the Best Actor/Actress and Best Supporting Actor/Actress awards in the same year for two roles in two movies, this has yet to happen—although there have been occasions where performers have been nominated for both in the same year.

== List ==
- † = deceased
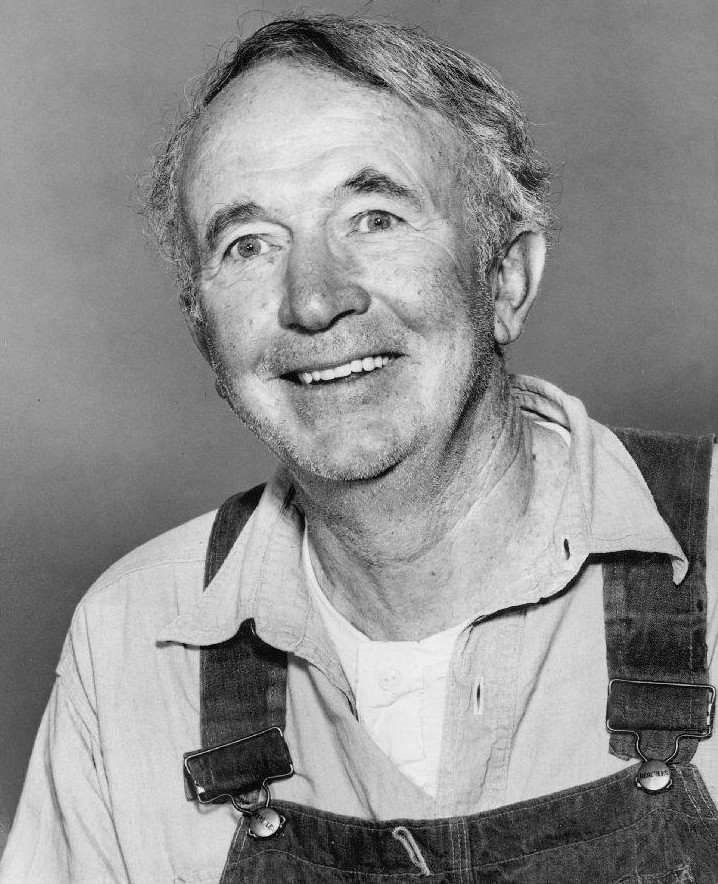
  Walter Brennan is the only person to win three Academy Awards for supporting actor or actress, and the first person to win three acting awards.
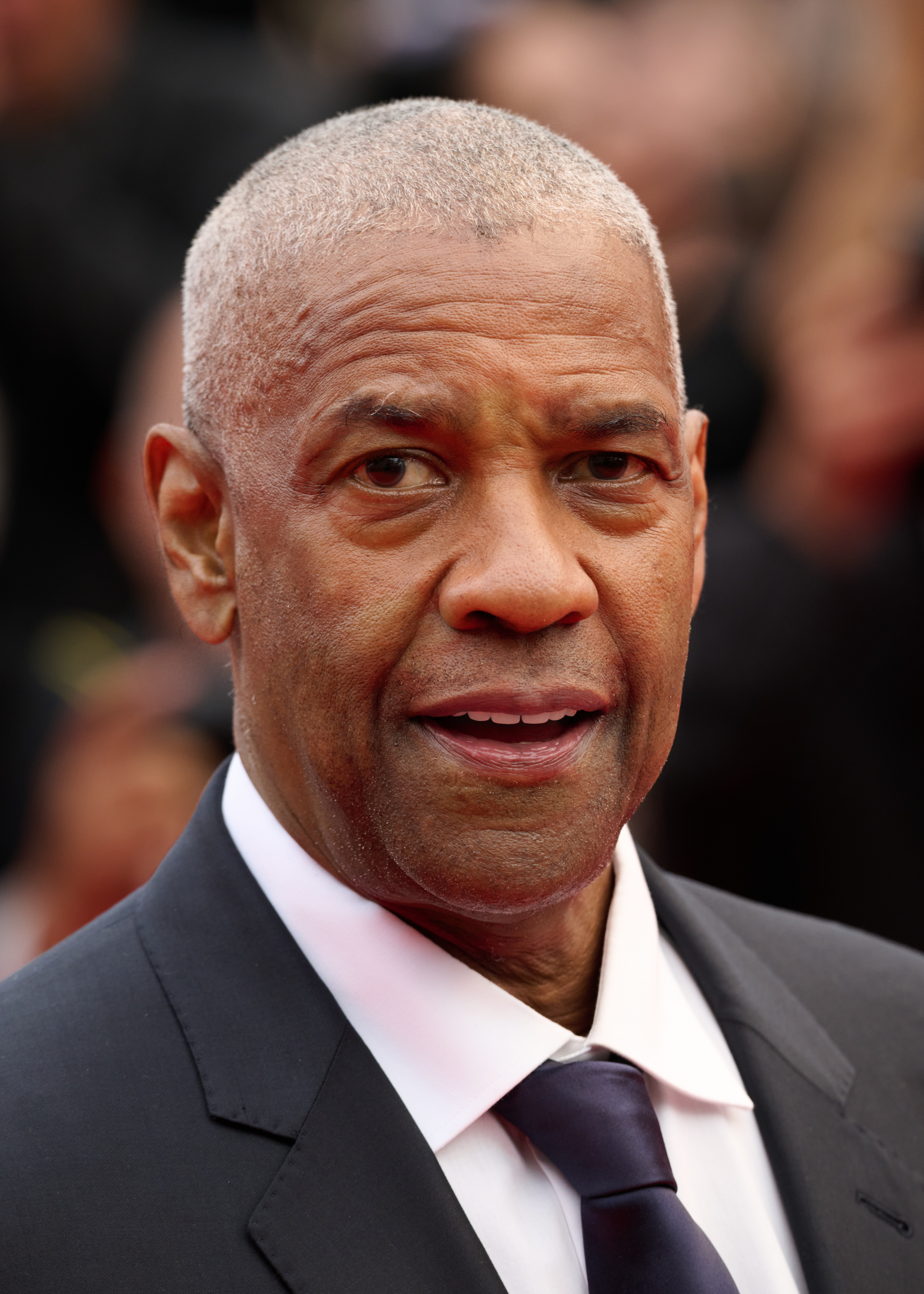
  Denzel Washington is the first African-American person to win two Academy Awards for acting.
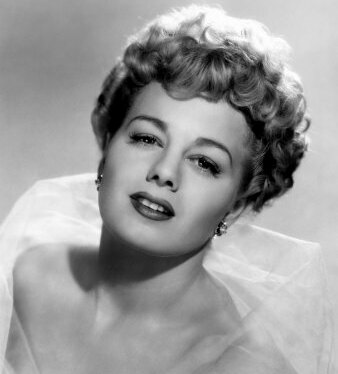
  Shelley Winters is the first person to win two Academy Awards for Best Supporting Actress.
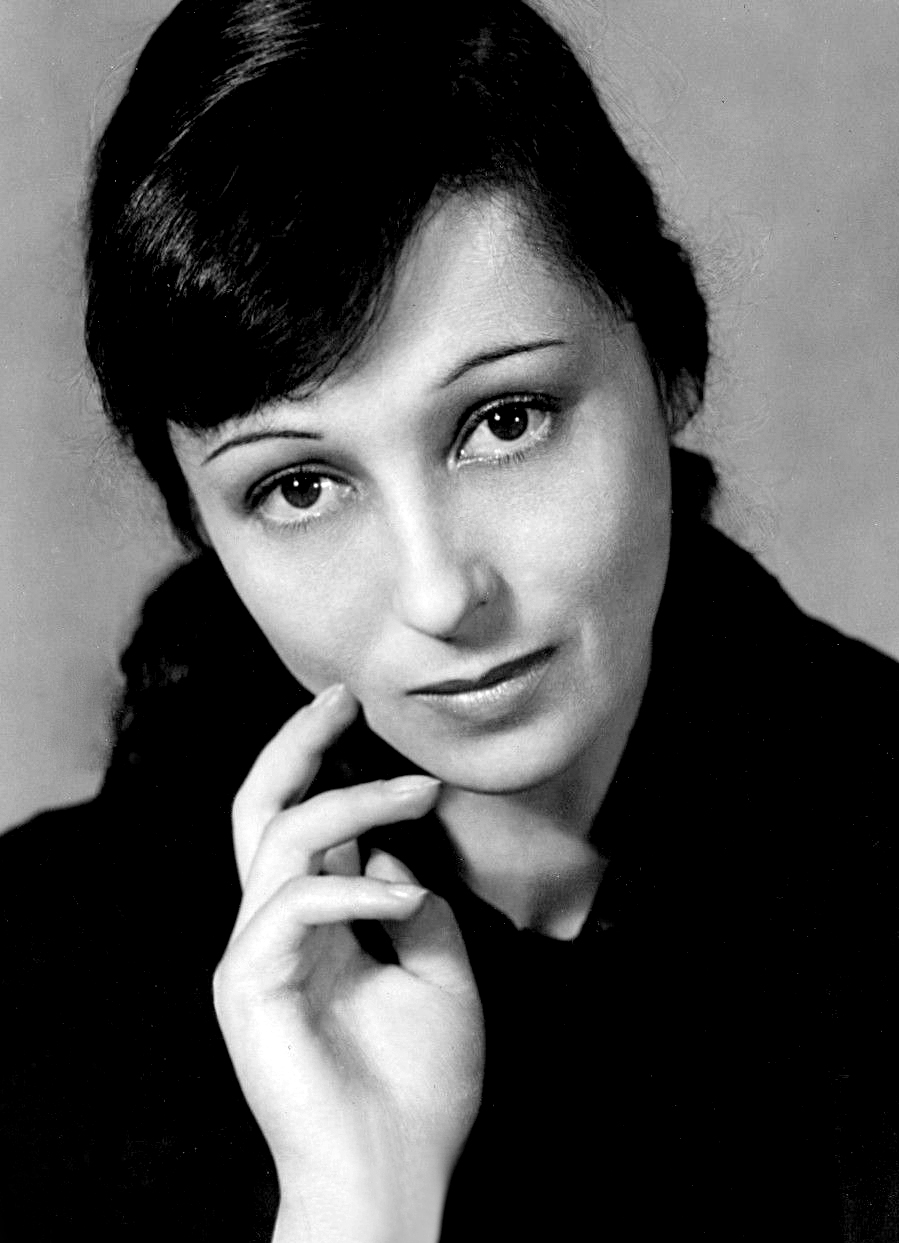
  Luise Rainer is the first person to win two Academy Awards for acting, and the first to win in back-to-back years.
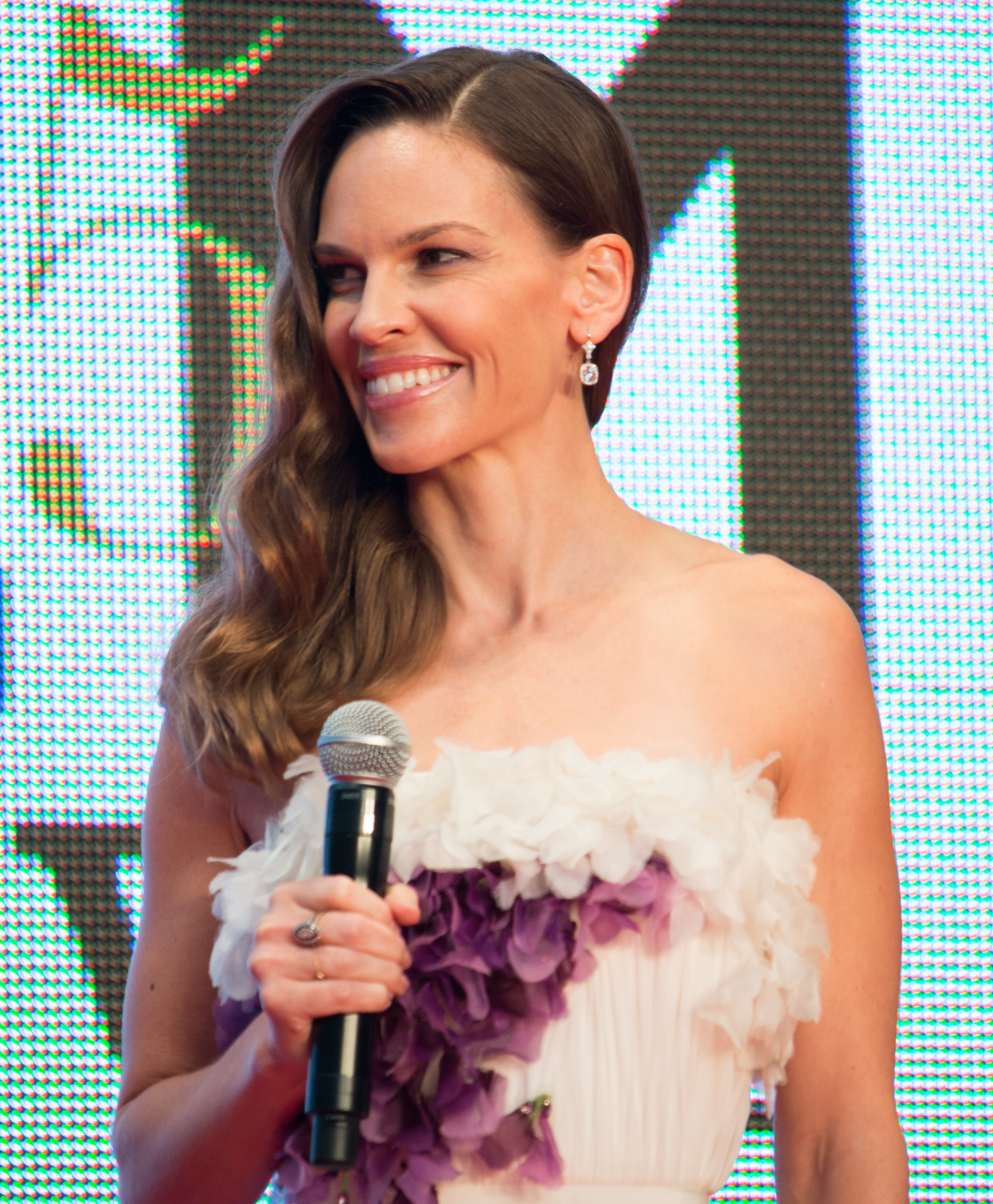
  Hilary Swank is the first person of Hispanic descent to win two Academy Awards for acting.
  Helen Hayes is the first person to win an acting Academy Award for lead performance and supporting performance.
  Mahershala Ali is the first Muslim to win two acting Academy Awards, and the first African American to win two awards for supporting actor or actress.

Actor/Actress	Best Actor/Actress Awards	Best Supporting Actor/Actress Awards	Year reached two wins	Total awards	Total nominations (for acting)
Katharine Hepburn †	Morning Glory (1933); Guess Who's Coming to Dinner (1967); The Lion in Winter (1968); On Golden Pond (1981)		1967	4	12
Meryl Streep	Sophie's Choice (1982); The Iron Lady (2011)	Kramer vs. Kramer (1979)	1982	3	21
Jack Nicholson	One Flew Over the Cuckoo's Nest (1975); As Good as It Gets (1997)	Terms of Endearment (1983)	1983	3	12
Ingrid Bergman †	Gaslight (1944); Anastasia (1956)	Murder on the Orient Express (1974)	1956	3	7
Daniel Day-Lewis	My Left Foot (1989); There Will Be Blood (2007); Lincoln (2012)		2007	3	6
Frances McDormand	Fargo (1996); Three Billboards Outside Ebbing, Missouri (2017); Nomadland (2020)		2017	3	6
Sean Penn	Mystic River (2003); Milk (2008)	One Battle After Another (2025)	2008	3	6
Walter Brennan †		Come and Get It (1936); Kentucky (1938); The Westerner (1940)	1938	3	4
Bette Davis †	Dangerous (1935); Jezebel (1938)		1938	2	11
Spencer Tracy †	Captains Courageous (1937); Boys Town (1938)		1938	2	9
Denzel Washington	Training Day (2001)	Glory (1989)	2001	2	9
Marlon Brando †	On the Waterfront (1954); The Godfather (1972)		1972	2	8
Cate Blanchett	Blue Jasmine (2013)	The Aviator (2004)	2013	2	8
Robert De Niro	Raging Bull (1980)	The Godfather Part II (1974)	1980	2	8
Jack Lemmon †	Save the Tiger (1973)	Mister Roberts (1955)	1973	2	8
Jane Fonda	Klute (1971); Coming Home (1978)		1978	2	7
Dustin Hoffman	Kramer vs. Kramer (1979); Rain Man (1988)		1988	2	7
Tom Hanks	Philadelphia (1993); Forrest Gump (1994)		1994	2	6
Anthony Hopkins	The Silence of the Lambs (1991); The Father (2020)		2020	2	6
Jessica Lange	Blue Sky (1994)	Tootsie (1982)	1994	2	6
Maggie Smith †	The Prime of Miss Jean Brodie (1969)	California Suite (1978)	1978	2	6
Michael Caine		Hannah and Her Sisters (1986); The Cider House Rules (1999)	1999	2	6
Gary Cooper †	Sergeant York (1941); High Noon (1952)		1952	2	5
Olivia de Havilland †	To Each His Own (1946); The Heiress (1949)		1949	2	5
Jodie Foster	The Accused (1988); The Silence of the Lambs (1991)		1991	2	5
Fredric March †	Dr. Jekyll and Mr. Hyde (1931); The Best Years of Our Lives (1946)		1946	2	5
Emma Stone	La La Land (2016); Poor Things (2023)		2023	2	5
Elizabeth Taylor †	BUtterfield 8 (1960); Who's Afraid of Virginia Woolf? (1966)		1966	2	5
Gene Hackman †	The French Connection (1971)	Unforgiven (1992)	1992	2	5
Glenda Jackson †	Women in Love (1970); A Touch of Class (1973)		1973	2	4
Renée Zellweger	Judy (2019)	Cold Mountain (2003)	2019	2	4
Anthony Quinn †		Viva Zapata! (1952); Lust for Life (1956)	1956	2	4
Shelley Winters †		The Diary of Anne Frank (1959); A Patch of Blue (1965)	1965	2	4
Sally Field	Norma Rae (1979); Places in the Heart (1984)		1984	2	3
Melvyn Douglas †		Hud (1963); Being There (1979)	1979	2	3
Jason Robards †		All the President's Men (1976); Julia (1977)	1977	2	3
Peter Ustinov †		Spartacus (1960); Topkapi (1964)	1964	2	3
Dianne Wiest		Hannah and Her Sisters (1986); Bullets Over Broadway (1994)	1994	2	3
Adrien Brody	The Pianist (2002); The Brutalist (2024)		2024	2	2
Vivien Leigh †	Gone with the Wind (1939); A Streetcar Named Desire (1951)		1951	2	2
Luise Rainer †	The Great Ziegfeld (1936); The Good Earth (1937)		1937	2	2
Hilary Swank	Boys Don't Cry (1999); Million Dollar Baby (2004)		2004	2	2
Helen Hayes †	The Sin of Madelon Claudet (1931)	Airport (1970)	1970	2	2
Kevin Spacey	American Beauty (1999)	The Usual Suspects (1995)	1999	2	2
Mahershala Ali		Moonlight (2016); Green Book (2018)	2018	2	2
Christoph Waltz		Inglourious Basterds (2009); Django Unchained (2012)	2012	2	2

== See also ==
- List of actors with more than one Academy Award nomination in the acting categories
- List of actors nominated for Academy Awards for non-English performances
- List of Academy Award records
