= List of Peabody Award winners (1950–1959) =

Peabody Award winners and honorable mentions.

== 1950 ==
Recipient	Area of Excellence
Metropolitan Opera, ABC Radio	Metropolitan Opera radio broadcasts, including the shows Auditions of the Air and the Opera Album and also highlighting the ABC Television broadcast of Margaret Webster's production of Don Carlo
ABC Radio, Elmer Davis	Reporting and Interpretation of News
ABC Television	Saturday at the Zoo, a program by the Bronx Zoo hosted by William Bridges
Jimmy Durante, NBC Television	a Personal Award
NBC Radio	Halls of Ivy
NBC Radio	The Quick and the Dead, a show on the nuclear age produced by Fred Friendly and starring Bob Hope and William L. Laurence
NBC Television	Zoo Parade
Radio Free Europe	Contribution to International Understanding
WBBM Radio, Chicago, Illinois	The Quiet Answer, Public Service by a Regional Station, for a documentary series on race relations
Honorable Mentions
ABC, Its President, Robert E. Kintner, and his associates, Robert Saudek and Joseph McDonald	for Their Courageous Stand in Resisting Organized Pressures and Their Reaffirmation of Basic American Principles. Kintner continued to employ Gypsy Rose Lee as the host of the game show What Makes You Tick? after Lee's appearance in Red Channels.
CBS Radio	Hear It Now
Mutual Broadcasting System and United Nations Radio	Contribution to International Understanding, Pursuit of Peace, produced by Norman Corwin, particularly the premiere program, "Document A/777"
Providence Journal, Its Editor and Publisher, Sevellon Brown, and Ben Bagdikian, Reporter	for the Series of Articles Analyzing the Broadcasts of Top Commentators
WAAM-TV, Baltimore, Maryland	The Johns Hopkins Science Review
WABF-FM, Ira Hirschmann, New York, New York	Entertainment (Music), for presentations of classical music
WFPL-FM, Louisville, Kentucky	Public Service by a Local Station
WNYC Radio, New York, New York	Contribution to International Understanding for United Nations Coverage

== 1951 ==
Recipient	Area of Excellence
ABC Television	Celanese Theatre
BBC, London, UK, and Alistair Cooke	Letter from America
CBS Radio	The Nation's Nightmare, a documentary on organized crime produced by Irving Gitlin
CBS Television, Edward R. Murrow	See It Now
KPOJ Radio, Portland, Oregon	Careers Unlimited and Civic Theatre on the Air, Meritorious Local Public Service by Radio. Careers Unlimited, a partnership with Portland Public Schools, the Exchange Club, and the Oregon State Employment Service, provided resources on employment for youth. Civic Theatre on the Air worked with a local Community theatre
NBC Radio	Bob and Ray
NBC Television, Gian Carlo Menotti	Amahl and the Night Visitors
WCAU-TV, Philadelphia, Pennsylvania	What in the World?
WQXR Radio, New York, New York	New York Times Youth Forum
WSB Radio and Television, Atlanta, Georgia	The Pastor's Study (radio) and Our World Today (television), Meritorious Regional Public Service by Radio and Television. Arthur Vann Gibson of Morningside Presbyterian Church hosted The Pastor's Study.

== 1952 ==
Recipient	Area of Excellence
ABC Radio, Martin Agronsky	a Personal Award for News
CBS Radio	The New York City Philharmonic Symphony Orchestra
NBC Radio	The Standard Symphony
NBC Television	Meet the Press
NBC Television	Mister Peepers
NBC Television	Your Hit Parade
NBC Television	Ding Dong School
NBC Television	Victory at Sea
WAAM-TV (DuMont Network), Baltimore, Maryland	The Johns Hopkins Science Review
WEWS-TV, Cleveland, Ohio	Television Local Public Service
WIS Radio, Columbia, South Carolina	Regional Public Service, Including Promotion of International Understanding

== 1953 ==
Recipient	Area of Excellence
BBC Television, London, UK	Promotion of International Understanding Through Television, Coverage of the Coronation of Queen Elizabeth II
Imogene Coca, NBC Television	a Personal Award
Gerald W. Johnson, WAAM-TV, Baltimore, Maryland	a Personal Award
KABC Radio, Los Angeles, California	Chet Huntley for Radio News
KNXT-TV, Los Angeles, California	Cavalcade of Books, hosted by Georgiana Hardy and Turnley Walker
Edward R. Murrow, CBS	a Personal Award
NBC Television	NBC Television Opera Theatre
NBC Television	Television Playhouse
NBC Television	Mr. Wizard
WBAW, Barnwell, South Carolina	Church of Your Choice, Public Service by a Local Station
WCBS-TV, New York, New York	Camera Three
WSB Radio and Television, Atlanta, Georgia	Removing the Rust From Radio and You and Your Health, Public Service by a Regional Radio-Television Station

== 1954 ==
Recipient	Area of Excellence
ABC Television	Disneyland
CBS Radio	Man's Right to Knowledge
CBS Television	Adventure
CBS Television	Omnibus
CBS Television	The Search, a program on discoveries in science, produced by Irving Gitlin and narrated by Charles Romine
John Daly, ABC Television	Personal Award, Radio-Television News
Pauline Frederick, NBC Radio	a Personal Award for Pauline Frederick at the U.N.
George Gobel, NBC Television	a Personal Award
KGAK Radio, Gallup, New Mexico	The Navajo Hour
National Association of Manufacturers	Industry on Parade
NBC Radio	Conversation, produced by Louis G. Cowan, Inc. and hosted by Clifton Fadiman
WJAR-TV, Providence, Rhode Island	Hurricane Carol
Boris Goldovsky, ABC, Metropolitan Opera	Personal Award for Radio Music, on the Metropolitan Opera radio broadcasts

== 1955 ==
Recipient	Area of Excellence
ABC Radio and Television	The Voice of Firestone
Dr. Frank Baxter, KNXT-TV, Los Angeles, California	a Personal Award, Television Education, for Shakespeare on TV
CBS Television	Lassie
Perry Como, NBC Television	a Personal Award, Television Entertainment
Douglas Edwards, CBS Television	a Personal Award, Television News
Jackie Gleason, CBS Television	a Personal Award, Television Entertainment
Quincy Howe, ABC Radio and Television	a Personal Award for his radio commentaries and Outside U. S. A. television show on international affairs
KIRO Radio, Seattle, Washington	Democracy is You, Radio Local Public Service, for showcasing the work of the Bureau of Community Development, University of Washington
NBC Radio	Biographies in Sound
NBC Television	Producers' Showcase, "with a special bow to Peter Pan"
Sylvester L. Weaver, NBC Radio and Television	a Personal Award for Pioneering Program Concepts
Honorable Mentions
CBS Television	Omnibus, for a series on the Adams political family
KFYO Radio, Lubbock, Texas	Local Public Service, for Footnotes on the Fine Arts with Jack Sheridan
KQED-TV, San Francisco, California	Television Local Public Service
NBC Television	Assignment: India, narrated by Chester B. Bowles
WMT-TV, Cedar Rapids, Iowa	Television Local Public Service, for The Secret Of Flight with Alexander Lippisch

== 1956 ==
Recipient	Area of Excellence
ABC Radio	Edward P. Morgan and the News
ABC Television, John Charles Daly	Television News for Coverage of the National Political Conventions
CBS Television	The Ed Sullivan Show
CBS Television	You Are There
CBS Television	World in Crisis
Jack Gould	Personal Award for His Outstanding Contribution to Radio and Television Through His New York Times Writings
Mutual Broadcasting System and NBC Radio	The Bob and Ray Show
NBC Television	Youth Wants To Know
Rod Serling	a Personal Award for Requiem for a Heavyweight
UNICEF	The Secret Life of Danny Kaye (an episode of See It Now)
United Nations Radio and Television	Promotion of International Understanding
WNYC Radio, New York, New York	Books in Profile
WNYC Radio, New York, New York	Little Orchestra Society Concerts
WOW Radio and Television, Omaha, Nebraska	Regimented Raindrops

== 1957 ==
Recipient	Area of Excellence
ABC Television, John Charles Daly	Prologue '58, a news program on the news of 1957 and a forecast for 1958
CBS Radio and Television	Radio and Television News Including Face the Nation (highlighting its interview with Nikita Khrushchev), See It Now, The Twentieth Century, and This is New York (an interview show on WCBS Radio hosted by Bill Leonard). The citation also mentioned Algeria Aflame, a documentary on the Algerian War anchored by Eric Sevareid with work from Frank Kearns, Youseff Masraff, and David Schoenbrun.
CBS Television	Captain Kangaroo
CBS Television	The Last Word
Bob Hope, NBC Television	a Personal Award
KING-TV, Seattle, Washington	Wunda Wunda
KLZ-TV, Denver, Colorado	Panorama, a news show hosted by Gene Amole
KPFA-FM, Berkeley, California	Local Radio Public Service
Louis M. Lyons, WGBH Radio and Television, Boston, Massachusetts	a Personal Award
NBC Radio and Television	the NBC Educational TV Project, working with the Educational Television and Radio Center which provided programming to educational television stations, and for Know Your Schools, working with the U.S. Department of Health, Education, and Welfare and local stations WRCA (AM and TV), WRCV (AM and TV), WRC (AM and TV), WNBC and WKNB, WBUG Buffalo, WMAQ and WNBQ, KRCA, and KNBC
NBC Television	The Dinah Shore Chevy Show
NBC Television	Hallmark Hall of Fame
Westinghouse Broadcasting Company, Inc.	Boston Conference on Programming and the High Quality of Its Public Service Broadcasting
WKAR Radio, East Lansing, Michigan	You Are the Jury, a traffic safety program
WQED-TV, Pittsburgh, Pennsylvania	The Heritage Series, programs on culture

== 1958 ==
Recipient	Area of Excellence
ABC Radio and UNESCO	Easy as ABC, a series discussing UNESCO projects and areas of concern
ABC Television	College News Conference, a program where college students asked questions of public figures
CBS Radio	The Hidden Revolution, a public affairs program about the problems humans face in modern society
CBS Television	Playhouse 90
CBS Television	Television Public Service with Special Recognition Given to Dr. Frank Stanton, for specials such as The Ruble War (moderated by Howard K. Smith), Where We Stand, Arab Ride-Prologue To The Summit, Face Of Red China and a series on the Middle East
CBS Television	Lincoln Presents Leonard Bernstein and the New York Philharmonic
NBC News	The Huntley-Brinkley Report
NBC Television	The Steve Allen Show
NBC Television	Continental Classroom
NBC Television	M.D. International, a documentary on American doctors working abroad, presented on March of Medicine
NBC Television	An Evening with Fred Astaire
NBC Television, Orson Welles	The Fountain of Youth (The Colgate Palmolive Theatre)
NBC Television, James Costigan	Little Moon of Alban (Hallmark Hall of Fame)
Standard Oil Company of California	The Standard School Broadcast
WGN-TV, Chicago, Illinois	The Blue Fairy
WNEW Radio, New York, New York	Radio News, highlighting news director Martin Weldon

== 1959 ==
Recipient	Area of Excellence
WGBH-TV/Boston, MA and The World Affairs Council of Boston	Decisions, moderated by Christian A. Herter Jr.
NBC Radio	Family Living '59, moderated by Arlene Francis
NBC	The Bell Telephone Hour
David Susskind (NBC)	Personal Award for Susskind's production of The Moon and Sixpence
WGN-TV/Chicago, IL	Great Music from Chicago, featuring the Chicago Symphony Orchestra
WCCO Radio/Minneapolis, MN	Separate awards for local public service
WDSU-TV/New Orleans, LA	Separate awards for local public service
ABC	Khrushchev Abroad
CBS	The Ed Sullivan Show
CBS	The Population Explosion, an episode of CBS Reports hosted by Howard K. Smith
CBS	Small World, hosted by Edward R. Murrow
CBS, Fred Friendly, and Edward R. Murrow	The Lost Class of '59
CBS Radio Network	The World Tonight
Dr. Frank Stanton (CBS)	Personal Award for Stanton's "courage, insight, and energy in fighting for the freedom of journalism on the air"
WNTA-TV/New York, NY (as flagship station of the NTA Film Network)	The Play of the Week
