= Al Wasserman =

American documentary filmmaker (1921–2005)

- Born: February 9, 1921; Bronx, New York, United States
- Died: March 31, 2005 (aged 84); Manhattan, New York, United States
- Education: Bachelor of Science, City College of New York, 1941
- Occupation: documentary filmmaker

Albert Wasserman (February 9, 1921 – March 31, 2005) was an American documentary filmmaker. He earned an Academy Award in 1947 for his work on the film First Steps. Wasserman created and worked on documentary series including NBC White Paper (1960–1980) and 60 Minutes (1968-).

== Life ==
Born in the Bronx on February 9, 1921, Wasserman was the only child of Beatrice Schaffer Wasserman, and her husband, pharmacist Martin Wasserman. He earned a Bachelor of Science from the City College of New York in 1941, and married Della Newmark two years later. The couple had two children, though their union eventually ended in divorce. Wasserman later married Barbara Mailer Alson in 1968.

Wasserman died of lung cancer at Cabrini Hospital in Manhattan on March 31, 2005. He was 84.

== Career ==
=== Documentary film ===
Wasserman served in the United States Navy during World War II and worked as a freelance filmmaker after the war ended.

Wasserman earned an Academy Award in 1947 for his documentary First Steps, which portrayed the experiences of disabled children in physical therapy. He was also the producer of films such as Out of Darkness (1956).

He was employed as a staff writer, director and producer at CBS-TV from 1955 to 1960, making several films for The Search, a TV documentary series that won a Sylvania Award (in 1955) for network public service. "Brainwashing", an episode of The Twentieth Century that Wasserman produced, directed, and wrote in 1958, won a bronze medallion from The Christophers.

He then moved to NBC, where he became the founding producer of the Emmy-winning documentary series White Paper (1960–1980). Wasserman was personally nominated for two Emmy Awards for his writing on the show, in 1961 (with John Barron) and in 1962 (with Arthur Zegart); a White Paper film about war in Angola also earned him the Hillman Prize in 1961.

Wasserman left NBC to form his own independent production company, Wasserman Productions, in 1967, though the company was later dissolved in the mid-1970s. In 1973, he directed the film The Making of the President 1972, based on the book by Theodore H. White. However, the film’s release was delayed until 1975 due to the uncovering of the Watergate Scandal. He later worked as a producer at 60 Minutes (1968-) from 1976 until his retirement in 1986.

=== Photography ===
Having led a successful career in film production, Wasserman used his retirement to explore his passion for still photography. His work has been exhibited in New York City and Provincetown, Massachusetts.
