= Bert Spielvogel =

American cinematographer

Bert Spielvogel (1926–1974) was an American film cinematographer and director well known for his work on documentary, educational, and industrial and sponsored films. He also worked on a number of fictional films.

== Career ==
Speilvogel's early experience covers work with famous documentarian Robert Flaherty and the original Cinerama group. Along with Richard Leacock, he was a cinematographer on Flaherty's Louisiana Story, which received an Academy Award nomination for Best Writing Motion Picture Story in 1949 and has been selected for the National Film Registry. He was an instructor in Cinematography at the American University in Washington, DC. He also served as the newsreel March of Time's photographic chief.

Spielvogel was associated with several commercial and industrial film companies, including MPO Productions, National Film Studios in Washington, DC (Dead to the World), Norwood Studios (Warning Red), Potomac Films (Platform), On Film, Inc (In the Suburbs, Qualities of Aluminum), which he joined in 1961, and Pelican Films.

In New York, he was part of the dynamic art scene around 98 Greene Street, where, according to one scholar, he "supervised the film program and tended the machinery, produced Ads, a chain of television commercials documenting the history of this genre from its beginning-a history that Spielvogel in his days as a pioneering maker of TV commercials had significantly shaped."

He also shot commercial and fictional feature films. Dirtymouth, a biopic of Lenny Bruce, was described by the New York Times reviewer in 1971 as a "very bad movie."

== Filmography ==
- 98.5 (1972), as producer with Holly Solomon
- Fresh Kill, as cinematographer, a 13-minute part of 98.5, which records the destruction of Gordon Matta-Clark's truck and shown at Documenta 5
- Clockshower (1974)
- Elvis on Tour (1972), as camera operator
- Dirtymouth (1970)
- The Tailor (1970), for USIA
- The Filmmaker (1969), photographed by, about filmmaker Tom Palazzolo, for USIA
- The Violent Universe (1969), additional photography for BBC
- Strangeness minus Three (1964), for BBC series Horizon
- Year of Birth (1964), presented by the National Institute of Neurological Diseases and Blindness in association with Brown University
- Qualities of Aluminum series, for sponsor Alcoa, which won the award for best series and best black and white cinematography in the 1961 American TV Commercials Festival
- Dead to the World (1961), as cinematographer, based on the novel State Department Murders
- Minuteman-Missile and Mission, sponsored by Thiokol Chemical, narrated by Alistair Cooke, with location sequences filmed in Thiokol's Utah Division and at Edwards Air Force base in California
- The New Girl (1960)
- Last Clear Chance (1959), photographed by, produced for the Union Pacific Railroad about the dangers of unprotected railroad crossings
- Platform (1959), an interview with Frank Lloyd Wright
- Drew Pearson's Washington Merry Go-Round for Hullnagle-Cassellberry Productions
- In the Suburbs (1957)
- The Relaxed Wife (1957)
- Commencement (1956), director of photography, for the Department of Labor
- Warning Red (1956)
- New Family in Town (1956)
- Unidentified Flying Objects: The True Story of Flying Saucers (1956)
- From 5 to 7:30 (195?), presented by the American Temperance Society (alcoholism and problem drinking awareness film)
- Louisiana Story (1948), sponsored by Standard Oil Company
- First Steps (1946), as camera assistant, for the United Nations Film Board film about a "disabled child" learning to walk and directed by Leo Seltzer, which won the Academy of Motion Picture Arts and Sciences Documentary Award, 1948
