= The Ford 50th Anniversary Show =

1953 television special

- Duet by Mary Martin and Ethel Merman
- Directed by: Clark Jones
- Starring: Oscar Hammerstein II; Edward R. Murrow; Wally Cox; Kukla and Ollie; Mary Martin; Ethel Merman; Rudy Vallée; Marian Anderson
- Music by: Bernard Green

Production
- Running time: 2 hours

Original release
- Release: June 15, 1953

The Ford 50th Anniversary Show, also known as The American Road, was a two-hour television special that was broadcast live on June 15, 1953, from 9 p.m. to 11 p.m. Ford Motor Company purchased two hours of prime time from both NBC and CBS for an entertainment extravaganza celebrating the company's 50th anniversary. The program was presented without commercial interruption.

Featuring performances from an all-star cast and choreography by Jerome Robbins, the program received four honors at the 1954 Sylvania Television Awards. The program has been called "a landmark in television" and "a milestone in the cultural life of the '50s".

== Synopsis ==
Following introductory comments from Leland Hayward, the broadcast presented various musical, dramatic, comedy, and historical segments:

1. Oscar Hammerstein II introduces a scene from the play Life With Father featuring Howard Lindsay and Dorothy Stickney.
2. Edward R. Murrow introduces a comic sketch featuring Wally Cox as the American male trying to improve his physique.
3. Kukla and Ollie introduce a comic sketch showing the evolution of beach clothing over the past 50 years.
4. Oscar Hammerstein introduces a scene from Thornton Wilder's Our Town featuring Mary Martin and Hammerstein.
5. Edward R. Murrow introduces a comic sketch featuring Kukla and Ollie driving and singing in a Ford Model T automobile. The segment also includes clips of the Model T in silent movies, including Harold Lloyd and Keystone Cops comedies. Murrow reviews the history of the Model T and Ford's development of the assembly line.
6. Edward R. Murrow introduces a musical review of Dixieland jazz music and Ethel Merman singing "Alexander's Ragtime Band".
7. Oscar Hammerstein introduces a compilation of silent movie clips featuring Theda Bara, Charlie Chaplin, Marie Dressler, excerpts from The Birth of a Nation, and Rudolph Valentino.
8. Wally Cox appears in a comic sketch examining relaxation methods.
9. Edward R. Murrow introduces a musical performance of Ethel Merman singing "Mademoiselle from Armentières" with backup singers in doughboy uniforms.
10. Oscar Hammerstein introduces a comic review of 50 years of women's fashion featuring Mary Martin.
11. Kukla and Ollie present an "Oliver J. Dragon" compilation of newsreel scenes with the two puppets providing commentary on news events and personalities.
12. Wally Cox appears in a comic sketch in which he explains techniques that allowed him to change from wallflower to popularity.
13. Oscar Hammerstein introduces a review of scenes from classic films The Big Parade, Flesh and the Devil, and The Jazz Singer
14. Mary Martin and Ethel Merman pantomime a recorded vaudeville performance by The Happiness Boys.
15. Kukla and Ollie continue Oliver J. Dragon's newsreel compilation.
16. A segment choreographed by Jerome Robbins reviews dance styles of the 1920s.
17. Edward R. Murrow presents a segment dealing with the Great Depression and the New Deal.
18. Lowell Thomas offers an ironic story and presents a tribute to Amos 'n' Andy.
19. A medley of songs is performed by Rudy Vallée ("The Stein Song"), Bing Crosby ("White Christmas") Frank Sinatra ("You Go To My Head", "That Old Black Magic"), Eddie Fisher ("I Believe")
20. Wally Cox appears in a comic sketch about learning to dance.
21. Oscar Hammerstein introduces a Jerome Robbins dance medley, starting with a waltz from the turn of the century and including swing dancing and modern dance.
22. Marian Anderson sings the spiritual, "He's Got the Whole World in His Hands".
23. Edward R. Murrow narrates a segment about the battle against aggression, that includes excerpts from Winston Churchill's "finest hour" speech, Arthur Godfrey's emotional radio narration from the funeral of Franklin Roosevelt, and Murrow's commentary about the Cold War with the Soviet Union.
24. A nine-and-a-half minute song medley opens with Ethel Merman singing "There's No Business Like Show Business", follows with Mary Martin singing "I'm in Love with a Wonderful Guy", and continues with the two combining on many other popular songs of the past 50 years.
25. Kukla and Ollie complain about having to follow Ethel Merman and Mary Martin. Ollie says, "There's no business like television, either." Kukla replies, "Well, it's so young." Ollie says, "Yes. Whenever will it grow up? Maybe tonight. Maybe tonight."
26. With the image of a mushroom cloud in the background, Edward R. Murrow and Oscar Hammerstein provide their closing comments, covering the future of music, the danger of nuclear war, peacetime uses of nuclear energy, and the need for education, American leadership, and peaceful coexistence. Henry Ford II adds his closing comments about America's potential and anticipated improvements in the next 50 years.
27. The show closes with Marian Anderson singing the "Battle Hymn of the Republic".

== Cast ==
- Oscar Hammerstein II
- Howard Lindsay
- Dorothy Stickney
- Edward R. Murrow
- Wally Cox
- Kukla and Ollie
- Mary Martin
- Ethel Merman
- Lowell Thomas
- Rudy Vallée
- Bing Crosby (on film)
- Frank Sinatra (on film)
- Eddie Fisher
- Marian Anderson

== Production ==
The show aired on both CBS and NBC, covering 114 television stations from coast to coast, and attracted an audience of 60 million viewers.

The show was staged at the Center Theater in New York City. The show's director, Clark Jones, later called it "the very first television spectacular" and "the most exciting show" he ever did. Ford spent approximately $500,000 on the program, making it the most expensive television program in history up to that time.

The show was produced by Leland Hayward, the Tony Award-winning producer whose credits include South Pacific and The Sound of Music. On the morning after the show, The New York Times wrote that Hayward "stands on the TV peaks" for his "consummate accomplishment" in putting together the "mammoth production . . . with such imagination and showmanship."

The costumes were designed by Academy Award-winning costumer designer Irene Sharaff. Scenic supervision was provided by Academy Award-winning art director Richard Day. Lois Long of The New Yorker wrote the commentary for the "50 years of fashion" segment. Other scripted portions were written by Frederick Lewis Allen, editor of Harper's Magazine, and Sidney A. Olson, a noted correspondent and editor for Time and Life magazines.

The program featured a lengthy duet between Ethel Merman and Mary Martin, considered the leading ladies of American theatre at the time, singing a medley of classic American songs. The New York Times wrote that there "was no greater delight" in the program. Another reviewer called it "possibly the greatest singing act that's ever been seen on television." The duet was such a popular sensation that it was promptly released by Decca as a long-playing record.

It also included comedy sketches performed by Wally Cox, songs performed by crooners Rudy Vallée, Bing Crosby, Frank Sinatra, and Eddie Fisher, and two dance segments choreographed by Jerome Robbins. The show also featured commentary by CBS newsman Edward R. Murrow and lyricist Oscar Hammerstein II covering a variety of topics, including the danger of nuclear war against the backdrop of a mushroom cloud. Murrow also offered indirect criticism of McCarthyism, saying: "Nations have lost their freedom while preparing to defend it, and if we in this country confuse dissent with disloyalty, we deny the right to be wrong."

The show closed with African-American contralto Marian Anderson singing The Battle Hymn of the Republic.

Due to the show's popularity, Ford replayed the program on a continuous basis at the Ford Rotunda in Dearborn, Michigan. According to the Detroit Free Press, it became an attraction for tourists and was seen by more than 100,000 visitors in the from June 16 to June 29.

== Reception and awards ==
=== Contemporary reviews ===
On the day after the broadcast, Jack Gould of The New York Times opened his review: "Terrific! Terrific! That's the only possible way to describe last night's two-hour special show." Gould went on to call it "one of the epochal evenings in the entertainment world", "an evening to be long remembered and treasured", and "a breathtaking, and nostalgic review of the last half-century done with enormous style, wit and gaiety." Gould closed his review as follows: "The Ford Motor Company earned a nation's thanks last night for a grand show . . . Seldom has there been such glorious television."

In the Minneapolis Morning Tribune, Will Jones wrote: "I felt like applauding a couple of times Monday night during the Ford 50th anniversary TV show. Then I held back, because it's silly to sit there clapping at a TV set. It's really too bad, though, that a TV show can't collect the applause it deserves if it's good enough to make people at home respond that way."

In the New York Daily News, Broadway writer Danton Walker took a different view, calling the show "a mishmash of oddities" and concluding that it was "a case of 'too many cooks' and an effort to encompass too much." He did concede that Ethel Merman was "her usual superb self", called Mary Martin "the real star of the show", and found Martin's 50 years of fashion review to be "a gem, brilliantly conceived and brilliantly performed."

In The Indianapolis News, Georgia Gianakos called it "a tremendous blend of talent both on and off the stage, and emerged as a masterpiece of television production."

In The San Francisco Examiner, Dwight Nelson opined that "[e]very sequence was unforgettable" and called it "the biggest TV show in history" and "a colossal milestone in TV history, setting a target for a thousand tomorrows."

=== Sylvania Awards ===
In December 1953, the Ford 50th Anniversary Show won honored at the 1953 Sylvania Television Awards. The program received four special awards for Leland Hayward's production, Clark Jones' direction, Jerome Robbins' choreography, and Mary Martin's performance.

=== Legacy ===
In 1960, television critic Marie Torre wrote that the Ford show is "still held as the measuring rod for the best in television entertainment."

Forty years after the broadcast, television critic Tom Shales recalled the broadcast as both "a landmark in television" and "a milestone in the cultural life of the '50s". He called it "the most stupendous" in an era of "super special shows."
