= 1954 in television =

The year 1954 in television involved some significant events. Below is a list of television-related events during 1954.

== Events ==
- January 1 – NBC broadcasts the Rose Parade from Pasadena, California in NTSC color. The broadcast uses a new mobile color TV studio (truck) and the program is carried across the continent on 21 stations. RCA strategically places Color TV sets in public viewing areas such as hotel lobbies because the first sets only become available to the public in the spring.
- January 3 – Programma Nazionale began transmissions in Italy, making it the first TV network in Italian television.
- January 5 – WAYS-TV, predecessor of WCCB, signed on the air. It was North Carolina's second UHF station (after WNAO-TV in Raleigh), as well as the second television station in the Charlotte market.
- January 10 – CBMT opens in Montreal, making that city the first in Canada to have 2 stations operating. The new station uses the English language, leaving CBFT to continue entirely in French.
- January 11 – The first weather forecast with an in-vision presenter is televised in the UK.
- January 12 – Experimental television begins in Norway.
- February 28 – Telma became the first television station in Morocco. It was closed down after 15 months on the air and was left without an official TV station until 1962.
- March 28 – WKAQ-TV became the first television station in Puerto Rico.
- April – The American Broadcasting Company broadcasts the Army-McCarthy hearings live and in their entirety.
- May 1
  - WAPA-TV becomes the second television station in Puerto Rico.
  - Télévision suisse romande TSR is launched as the first Italian broadcaster in Switzerland.
- May 17–23 – One week (the so-called "Sandrewsveckan" or "Sandrews week") of experimental television broadcasts are aired in Sweden, the first such programs in the country.
- June 5 – The last new episode of the comic variety program, Your Show of Shows, airs.
- June 6 – The Eurovision network makes its first official transmission: it broadcasts the Narcissus Festival in Montreux, Switzerland, followed by an evening program from Rome, including a tour of the Vatican City, an address from Pope Pius XII and an apostolic blessing.
- June 13 – Canal Nacional, predecessor of Canal 1, launched as the first Colombian television station.
- July 5 – First actual news bulletin, News and Newsreel, aired on BBC Television, replacing Television Newsreel.
- September 11 – The Miss America Beauty Contest airs for the first time on national television in the United States. 27 million viewers watched as Lee Ann Meriwether wins the title. Meriwether would later become a television actress, co-starring in Barnaby Jones (1973–1980).
- September 16 – CBET-DT began transmissions as CKLW-TV at 2:50 p.m., it was the first television station in Windsor.
- September 26 – WCAX-TV signs on the air as WMVT, making it the first television station in Vermont.
- October 2 – The Jimmy Durante Show premieres on NBC (1954–1956).
- October 29 – Sveriges Radio begins broadcasting TV in Sweden and apart from news and a weather forecast, the first Swedish TV programme is "En skål för televisionen" ("A Toast to Television") led by Lennart Hyland. For the first few months (until spring 1955), Swedish TV is broadcast one evening a week and for about an hour each time.
- November 3 – Disney's Alice in Wonderland airs on ABC in the United States.
- November 6 – LTV began broadcasting for the first time in Latvia and the oldest in the Baltic countries.
- November 19 – Télé Monte-Carlo launched in Monaco, the first microstate to have a television network.
- December 12 – BBC Television broadcasts its famous, and controversial, adaptation of George Orwell's novel Nineteen Eighty-Four.
- The Television Act 1954 authorises setting up the infrastructure for British commercial television.
- The British Academy Television Awards, the most prestigious awards of the British television industry, are first awarded.
- The RCA CT-100 and Westinghouse 15" color sets hit the market. Neither are big sellers.

== Programs/programmes ==
A TV schedule showing programming from 4 pm. to 10 p.m., Thursday, September 16, 1954, for four TV stations in Chicago.

=== Series on the air in 1954 ===
- Adventures of Superman (1952–1958)
- American Bandstand (1952–1989)
- Bozo the Clown (1949–present)
- Buick-Berle Show (1953–1954); the show was renamed The Milton Berle Show (1954–1967) this year
- Candid Camera (1948–2014)
- Cavalcade of America (1952-1957)
- Cisco Kid (1950–1956)
- The Colgate Comedy Hour (1950-1955)
- Come Dancing (UK) (1949–1995)
- Death Valley Days (1952–1975)
- Dragnet (1951–1959)
- General Motors Theatre (Can) (1953–1956, 1958–1961)
- Gillette Cavalcade of Sports (1946–1960)
- Hallmark Hall of Fame (1951–present)
- Hawkins Falls (1950, 1951–1955)
- Hockey Night in Canada (1952–present)
- Howdy Doody (1947–1960)
- I Love Lucy (1951–1960)
- Kraft Television Theatre (1947–1958)
- Kukla, Fran and Ollie (1947–1957)
- Life is Worth Living (1952–1957)
- Life with Elizabeth (1952–1955)
- Love of Life (1951–1980)
- Meet the Press (1947–present)
- Muffin the Mule (1946–1955)
- My Little Margie (1952–1955)
- Our Miss Brooks (1952-1956)
- Panorama (UK) (1953–present)
- Search for Tomorrow (1951–1986)
- Sky King (1951-1962)
- The Adventures of Ozzie and Harriet (1952–1966)
- The Colgate Comedy Hour (1950-1955)
- The Ed Sullivan Show (1948–1971)
- The George Burns and Gracie Allen Show (1950–1958)
- The Goldbergs (1949–1955)
- The Good Old Days (UK) (1953–1983)
- The Guiding Light (1952–2009)
- The Jack Benny Program (1950–1965)
- The Roy Rogers Show (1951–1957)
- The Today Show (1952–present)
- The Voice of Firestone (1949–1963)
- This Is Your Life (US) (1952–1961)
- Truth or Consequences (1950–1988)
- What's My Line (1950–1967)
- Where's Raymond? or The Ray Bolger Show (1953–1955)
- Your Hit Parade (1950–1959)

=== Debuts ===
- January 1 – Annie Oakley (1954–1957)
- January 4 – The Brighter Day (1954–1962)
- January 23 – Stories of the Century (1954–1955)
- February 1 - The Secret Storm (1954–1974)
- March 11 – The Public Defender on CBS (1954–1955)
- April 2 – The Grove Family, on BBC Television (1954–1957); generally considered the first British TV soap opera
- April 8 – Justice on NBC (1954–1956)
- April 18 – The Martha Wright Show on ABC
- April 26 – The Tony Martin Show on NBC
- July 5 - Concerning Miss Marlowe on NBC.
- July 6 - The Blue Angel on CBS.
- July 16 - The Best in Mystery on NBC. (1954)
- August 5 – So You Want to Lead a Band on ABC (1954–1955)
- August 28 – The Mickey Rooney Show: Hey, Mulligan on NBC (1954–1955)
- September 7
  - Stop the Music premiered for the second time on ABC after a two-year hiatus
  - It's a Great Life on NBC (1954–1956)
- September 10 – Dear Phoebe on NBC (1954–1955)
- September 12 – Lassie on CBS (1954–1973)
- September 18 – Willy on CBS (1954–1955)
- September 27 – The Tonight Show on NBC (1954–present)
- October 2
  - The Imogene Coca Show on NBC (1954–1955)
  - The Jimmy Durante Show on NBC (1954–1956)
- October 3 - Father Knows Best on CBS (1954-60)
- October 5 - The Elgin Hour on ABC (1954-1955)
- October 7 – The Mail Story, subtitled Handle with Care, on ABC (1954)
- October 1 – Flash Gordon (1954–1955), starring Steve Holland
- October 15 – The Adventures of Rin Tin Tin on ABC (1954–1959)
- October 17 - The Search on CBS (1954-1955)
- October 19 - The Halls of Ivy on CBS (1954-1955)
- October 21 – The CBS anthology series, Climax! (1954–1958) airs an adaptation of Ian Fleming's novel, Casino Royale, starring Barry Nelson as an Americanized version of spy James Bond; the first dramatic adaptation of a Bond novel
- October 22 - The Jack Carson Show on NBC (1954-1955)
- October 27 – The Walt Disney anthology series debuts as Disneyland (1954–present; as Disneyland 1954–1958)
- November 13 – Fabian of the Yard, the first British TV police procedural, debuts on BBC (1954–1956)
- December 21 – Zoo Quest on BBC Television (1954–1964)
- Face the Nation on CBS (1954–present)
- The Jo Stafford Show, a 15-minute primetime variety series, on CBS (1954–1955)
- The National premieres as The National News on CBC (1954–present)
- That's My Boy on CBS

=== Ending this year ===
Date	Show	Debut
January 11	Of Many Things	1953
February 5	The Comeback Story	1953
February 24	Answers for Americans	1953
March 9	This Is Show Business	1949
March 28	Jukebox Jury	1953
May 11	Judge for Yourself	1953
June 5	Your Show of Shows	1950
June 17	Martin Kane, Private Eye	1949
July 2	The Pride of the Family	1953
July 2	Television Newsreel (UK)	1948
July 20	Mr. and Mrs. North	1952
August 1	Juvenile Jury	1947
August 2	The Dennis Day Show	1953
August 21	Bank on the Stars	1953
September 3	The Best in Mystery	1954
October 3	The Man Behind the Badge	1953
October 10	Author Meets the Critics	1947
October 12	The Blue Angel	1954
November 20	The Paul Winchell Show	1950
December 5	The Martha Wright Show	1954
December 26	Rocky King Detective	1950
December 30	The Mail Story	1947

== Births ==
Date	Name	Notability
January 2	Cynthia Sikes Yorkin	Actress (St. Elsewhere)
January 5	Alex English	NBA basketball player
January 6	Trudie Styler	Actress
January 7	Jodi Long	Actress
January 8	Jerry Vivino	American musician
January 12	Howard Stern	Radio and TV personality (America's Got Talent)
January 17	Robert F. Kennedy Jr.	Politician
January 18	Ted DiBiase	Professional wrestler
January 19	Katey Sagal	Actress and singer (Married... with Children, Futurama, Sons of Anarchy)
January 24	William Allen Young	Actor (Moesha)
January 27	Ed Schultz	Talk show host and sportscaster (d. 2018)
January 27	Adrian Taylor	Producer (d. 2014)
January 28	Simon Templeman	Actor
January 29	Oprah Winfrey	Actress and talk-show host (The Oprah Winfrey Show)
February 1	Bill Mumy	Actor and musician (Lost in Space)
February 2	Christie Brinkley	Model and actress
February 6	David Hart	Actor (In the Heat of the Night)
February 9	René Balcer	Writer
February 15	Matt Groening	Creator of The Simpsons and Futurama
February 17	Rene Russo	Actress
February 18	John Travolta	Actor (Welcome Back, Kotter)
February 18	John Mankiewicz	Director
February 20	Anthony Head	English actor (Buffy the Vampire Slayer) (d. 2026)
February 20	Patty Hearst	Actress
March 1	Catherine Bach	Actress (Daisy Duke on The Dukes of Hazzard)
March 1	Ron Howard	Actor (Opie Taylor on The Andy Griffith Show, Richie Cunningham on Happy Days) and director
March 3	Robert Gossett	Actor
March 4	Catherine O'Hara	Actress (d. 2026)
March 5	Marsha Warfield	Actress and comedian (Night Court)
March 5	Marla Pennington	Actress (Small Wonder)
March 9	Michele Marsh	Journalist (d. 2017)
March 9	Martin P. Robinson	Puppeteer
March 9	Kevin Wade	Producer
March 12	Eugene Robinson	Journalist
March 13	Robin Duke	Canadian actress and comedian (Saturday Night Live)
March 14	Adrian Zmed	Actor (T.J. Hooker)
March 15	Craig Wasson	Actor (One Life to Live)
March 17	Lesley-Anne Down	Actress (The Bold and the Beautiful)
March 24	Donna Pescow	Actress and director (Out of This World, Even Stevens)
March 24	Robert Carradine	Actor (Lizzie McGuire) (d. 2026)
March 29	Dianne Kay	Actress (Eight is Enough)
April 3	Glenn Gordon Caron	Writer
April 7	Jackie Chan	Hong Kong-born Chinese actor, filmmaker, martial artist and stuntman
April 9	Dennis Quaid	Actor
April 10	Peter MacNicol	Actor (Chicago Hope, Ally McBeal, Numb3rs)
April 10	Deborah Rush	Actress
April 16	Ellen Barkin	Actress
April 17	Roddy Piper	Actor (d. 2015)
April 18	Cynthia Ettinger	Actress
April 21	James Morrison	Actor (24)
April 21	Janet Zarish	Actress
April 28	John Pankow	Actor (Mad About You, Episodes)
April 29	Jerry Seinfeld	Actor and comedian (Seinfeld)
April 30	Thom Bray	Actor (Riptide)
April 30	David Bohrman	American news executive (d. 2023)
May 8	Pam Arciero	American voice artist
May 8	David Keith	American actor
May 8	Stephen Furst	American actor (Babylon 5, Buzz Lightyear of Star Command, St. Elsewhere) (d. 2017)
May 10	Mike Hagerty	Actor (d. 2022)
May 15	John Blyth Barrymore	Actor
May 18	Patrick St. Esprit	Actor
May 21	Janice Karman	Actress
May 21	Jean Kasem	Actress
May 28	Townsend Coleman	Actor (Teenage Mutant Ninja Turtles, The Tick)
June 2	Dennis Haysbert	Actor (24, The Unit)
June 5	Nancy Stafford	Actress (Matlock)
June 7	Bobby Di Cicco	Actor
June 10	Rich Hall	Writer
June 11	Greta Van Susteren	Television news anchor
June 12	Ella Joyce	Actress (Roc)
June 14	Kim Lankford	Actress (Knots Landing)
June 14	Will Patton	Actor
June 15	Jim Belushi	Actor (According to Jim)
June 17	Mark Linn-Baker	Actor (Larry Appleton on Perfect Strangers)
June 22	Chris Lemmon	Actor (Duet)
June 22	Freddie Prinze	Actor and comedian (Chico and the Man) (d. 1977)
June 28	Alice Krige	Actress
July 2	Wendy Schaal	Actress (It's a Living, American Dad!)
July 5	Don Stark	Actor (That '70s Show)
July 5	Debra McGrath	Actress
July 7	Ron Jones	Composer
July 9	Kevin O'Leary	Television personality
July 10	Lee David Zlotoff	Producer
July 13	Danitra Vance	Actress and comedian (Saturday Night Live) (d. 1994)
July 19	Mark O'Donnell	Writer (d. 2012)
July 19	Steve O'Donnell	Writer
July 22	Dianne Houston	Screenwriter
July 28	Bruce Abbott	Actor
July 28	Andrew Adelson	Producer
July 29	Jeannetta Arnette	Actress (Head of the Class)
July 30	Ken Olin	Actor, director and producer (thirtysomething, Brothers & Sisters)
July 31	Rainer Bock	Actor
August 2	Lisa Brown	Actress (d. 2021)
August 12	Sam J. Jones	Actor
August 16	James Cameron	Canadian filmmaker
August 20	Al Roker	American weather presenter
August 23	Marc Vann	Actor (Early Edition, Angel, CSI: Crime Scene Investigation)
August 28	Bob Bendetson	Writer
August 30	Jim Vallely	Writer
September 2	Vance DeGeneres	Actor
September 7	Corbin Bernsen	Actor and director (L.A. Law, Psych)
September 7	Michael Emerson	Actor (Lost, Person of Interest)
September 8	Anne Diamond	Television presenter (The Wright Stuff)
September 8	Joe Cipriano	Voice actor
September 10	Clark Johnson	Actor (Homicide: Life on the Street, The Wire)
September 11	Reed Birney	Actor
September 13	Isiah Whitlock Jr.	Actor (d. 2025)
September 14	Michael Patrick King	American director, writer, and producer of television and film
September 15	Barry Shabaka Henley	Actor
September 16	Mark McEwen	TV host
September 21	John Mengatti	Actor (The White Shadow)
September 22	Shari Belafonte	Actress (Hotel), daughter of Harry Belafonte
September 29	Cindy Morgan	Actress (Falcon Crest) (d. 2023)
September 30	Barry Williams	Actor (The Brady Bunch)
September 30	Patrice Rushen	Singer
October 1	Richard Schlesinger	Journalist
October 2	Lorraine Bracco	Actress
October 3	Al Sharpton	Civil rights activist
October 9	Scott Bakula	Actor (Quantum Leap, Star Trek: Enterprise, NCIS: New Orleans)
October 9	John O'Hurley	Actor
October 14	Elizabeth Sung	Actress (d. 2018)
October 15	Ingrid Tarrant	Wife of Chris Tarrant
October 15	Jere Burns	Actor
October 18	Arliss Howard	Actor
October 24	Doug Davidson	Actor (The Young and the Restless)
October 26	D. W. Moffett	Actor (For Your Love, Friday Night Lights, Switched at Birth)
October 26	James Pickens, Jr.	Actor (The X-Files, Grey's Anatomy)
November 3	Kathy Kinney	Actress and comedian (The Drew Carey Show)
November 6	Catherine Crier	American journalist
November 7	Gil Junger	Director
November 12	Rhonda Shear	TV personality, actress
November 13	Chris Noth	Actor (Law & Order, Sex and the City, The Good Wife)
November 14	Yanni	Composer
November 15	Kevin S. Bright	Producer
November 19	Kathleen Quinlan	Actress
November 23	Bruce Hornsby	Composer
November 24	Emir Kusturica	Actor
November 27	Patricia McPherson	Actress (Knight Rider)
November 27	Kimmy Robertson	Actress (Twin Peaks)
November 28	Marty Grabstein	Actor (Courage the Cowardly Dog)
December 1	Bob Goen	Game show host
December 1	Alan Dedicoat	English announcer
December 2	Dan Butler	Actor (Frasier, Hey Arnold!)
December 2	Patty Petersen	Actress
December 2	Stone Phillips	American television reporter
December 4	Tony Todd	Actor and producer
December 7	Priscilla Barnes	Actress (Three's Company)
December 10	Jeff Fager	American producer
December 18	Ray Liotta	Actor (d. 2022)
December 20	Michael Badalucco	Actor (The Practice)
December 26	Tony Rosato	Actor (Saturday Night Live, The Adventures of Super Mario Bros. 3, Super Mario World) (d. 2017)
December 28	Gayle King	Television personality
December 28	Denzel Washington	Actor (St. Elsewhere, Malcolm X, Training Day)
December 28	Lanny Poffo	Actor (d. 2023)

== Deaths ==
Date	Name	Age	Notability
September 28	Bert Lytell	69	Actor (One Man's Family, 1949–52, 1954)

== Television debuts ==
- Lew Ayres – Omnibus
- Carroll Baker – The Web
- Angie Dickinson – The Colgate Comedy Hour
- Dennis Hopper – Cavalcade of America
- Ruby Keeler – The Jackie Gleason Show
- Jayne Mansfield – Lux Video Theatre
- Ethel Merman – The Colgate Comedy Hour
- Robert Morse – The Secret Storm
- Nell O'Day – Studio One
- Ginger Rogers – Producers' Showcase
- Gilbert Roland – Ford Theatre
- Gena Rowlands – Top Secret
- Harry Dean Stanton – Inner Sanctum
- Adam West – The Philco Television Playhouse
