= It's Your Life =

It's Your Life may refer to:

- It's Your Life (radio program), a documentary radio series created by the Chicago Industrial Health Organization
- "It's Your Life" (Smokie song), 1977
- "It's Your Life" (Francesca Battistelli song), 2008
- "It's Your Life", a song by Milla Jovovich from her album The Divine Comedy
- "It's Your Life", a 1970 song by Andy Kim
- "It's Your Life", a song by Lenny Kravitz from the 1998 album 5
- "It's Your Life", a religious song recorded by the Dooley Family in 1954 on Christian Faith Records.
- "It's Your Life", a song by Loverboy from their 1981 album Get Lucky
