= Palazzolo =

Palazzolo may refer to:

== Places in Italy ==
- Palazzolo (Rome), a hill in Rome
- Palazzolo sull'Oglio, a comune in the Province of Brescia
- Palazzolo Acreide, a comune in the Province of Siracusa
- Palazzolo Vercellese, a comune in the Province of Vercelli
- Palazzolo dello Stella, a comune in the Province of Udine
- Palazzolo, a frazione of Sona in the Province of Verona
- Palazzolo, a frazione of Fossato di Vico in the Province of Perugia
- Palazzolo, a frazione of Incisa in Val d'Arno in the Province of Florence
- Palazzolo, a quarter of Paderno Dugnano in the Province of Milan

== Other uses ==
- Palazzolo (surname), a surname (and a list of people with the name)

== See also ==
- Palazzolo v. Rhode Island a 2001 U.S. Supreme Court precedent
