= Science in Action =

Science in Action may refer to:

- Science in Action (book), 1987 book by Bruno Latour
- Science in Action (TV series) television program produced by the California Academy of Sciences
- Science in Action (radio programme), radio programme produced by the BBC World Service
