= 6th Primetime Emmy Awards =

- Date: February 11, 1954
- Location: Hollywood Palladium, Los Angeles, California
- Presented by: Academy of Television Arts and Sciences
- Hosted by: Ed Sullivan

Highlights
- Most awards: I Love Lucy; The United States Steel Hour (2)
- Most nominations: I Love Lucy; The Jackie Gleason Show; Mister Peepers; Your Show of Shows (4)
- Outstanding Dramatic Program: The United States Steel Hour
- Outstanding Situation Comedy: I Love Lucy
- Outstanding Variety Program: Omnibus

Television/radio coverage
- Network: KHJ

The 6th Emmy Awards, later referred to as the 6th Primetime Emmy Awards, were held on February 11, 1954, to honor the best in television of the year. The ceremony was hosted by Don DeFore, actor and president of the Academy of Television Arts and Sciences, at the Hollywood Palladium in Los Angeles, California. All nominations are listed, with winners in bold and series' networks are in parentheses.

The ceremony included several new categories, including Best New Program, as well as awards for Supporting Actor and Actress in a television series. This was also the first year that acting nominees were nominated for a specific television show, in the past nominees were simply nominated as individuals.

== Winners and nominees ==
Winners are listed first, highlighted in boldface, and indicated with a double dagger (‡).

=== Programs ===
Programs
**Best Situation Comedy**: **I Love Lucy (CBS)**‡; The George Burns and Gracie Allen Show (CBS); Mr. Peepers (NBC); Our Miss Brooks (CBS); Topper (CBS)	**Best Dramatic Program**: **The United States Steel Hour (ABC)**‡; Kraft Television Theatre (NBC); Philco-Goodyear TV Playhouse (NBC); Robert Montgomery Presents (NBC); Studio One (CBS)
**Best Variety Program**: **Omnibus (CBS)**‡; The Colgate Comedy Hour (NBC); The Jackie Gleason Show (CBS); Your Show of Shows (NBC); Toast of the Town (CBS)	**Best Audience Participation, Quiz or Panel Program**: **This Is Your Life (NBC)**‡; **What's My Line? (CBS)**‡; I've Got a Secret (CBS); Two for the Money (CBS); You Bet Your Life (NBC)
**Best Mystery, Action or Adventure Program**: **Dragnet (NBC)**‡; Foreign Intrigue (NBC); I Led Three Lives (NBC); Suspense (CBS); The Web (CBS)	**Best Children's Program**: **Kukla, Fran and Ollie (NBC)**‡; Big Top (CBS); Ding Dong School (NBC); Super Circus (NBC); Zoo Parade (NBC)
**Best Public Affairs Program**: **Victory at Sea (NBC)**‡; Adventure (CBS); Life Is Worth Living (Syndication); Meet the Press (NBC); Person to Person (CBS)	**Best Program of News or Sports**: **See It Now (CBS)**‡; Camel News Caravan (NBC); Gillette Cavalcade of Sports (NBC); NCAA Football Games (NBC); Pabst Blue Ribbon Bouts (CBS); Professional Football (DuMont)
**Best New Program**: **Make Room for Daddy (ABC)**‡; **The United States Steel Hour (ABC)**‡; Adventure (CBS); Ding Dong School (NBC); The Loretta Young Show (NBC); Person to Person (CBS)

=== Acting ===
==== Lead performances ====
Lead performances
**Best Male Star of a Regular Series**: **Donald O'Connor – The Colgate Comedy Hour as himself (NBC)**‡; Sid Caesar – Your Show of Shows as various characters (NBC); Wally Cox – Mr. Peepers as Robinson Peepers (NBC); Jackie Gleason – The Jackie Gleason Show as Ralph Kramden (CBS); Jack Webb – Dragnet as Sgt. Joe Friday (NBC)	**Best Female Star of a Regular Series**: **Eve Arden – Our Miss Brooks as Connie Brooks (CBS)**‡; Lucille Ball – I Love Lucy as Lucy Ricardo (CBS); Imogene Coca – Your Show of Shows as various characters (NBC); Dinah Shore – The Dinah Shore Show as herself (NBC); Loretta Young – The Loretta Young Show as herself (NBC)

==== Supporting performances ====
Supporting performances
**Best Series Supporting Actor**: **Art Carney – The Jackie Gleason Show as Ed Norton (CBS)**‡; Ben Alexander – Dragnet as Officer Frank Smith (NBC); William Frawley – I Love Lucy as Fred Mertz (CBS); Tony Randall – Mr. Peepers as Harvey Weskitt (NBC); Carl Reiner – Your Show of Shows as various characters (NBC)	**Best Series Supporting Actress**: **Vivian Vance – I Love Lucy as Ethel Mertz (CBS)**‡; Bea Benaderet – The George Burns and Gracie Allen Show as Blanche Morton (CBS); Ruth Gilbert – The Milton Berle Show as Max (NBC); Marion Lorne – Mr. Peepers as Mrs. Gurney (NBC); Audrey Meadows – The Jackie Gleason Show as Alice Kramden (CBS)

=== Hosting ===
Hosting
**Most Outstanding Personality**
- **Edward R. Murrow (CBS)**‡
  - Arthur Godfrey (CBS)
  - Martha Raye (NBC)
  - Fulton J. Sheen (Syndication)
  - Jack Webb (NBC)

== Most major nominations ==
By network (Note: "Major" constitutes the categories listed above: Program, Acting, Directing, and Writing. Does not include the technical categories.)

- NBC – 36
- CBS – 30
- ABC – 3

By program

- I Love Lucy (CBS) / The Jackie Gleason Show (CBS) / Mr. Peepers (NBC) / Your Show of Shows (NBC) – 4

== Most major awards ==
By network

- CBS – 8
- NBC – 5
- ABC – 3

By program

- I Love Lucy (CBS) / The United States Steel Hour (ABC) – 2
