= The Search (American TV series) =

American TV documentary series (1954–1955)

The Search is an American documentary television series that was broadcast on CBS from October 17, 1954, to September 27, 1955. Reruns were aired on CBS in the summer of 1958.

== Overview ==
The Search reported on research that was being conducted at American universities. Charles Romine narrated the episodes, which were filmed on campuses where the research was occurring. Rather than reenacting events, episodes had people involved with the topic appear on camera, speaking to the viewers. The series "tried to capture some of the feel of the work" involved in potentially beneficial research. While the series gave some attention to pure research, the main focus was on scientific investigations that led to solutions for practical problems.

== Episodes ==
Partial List of Episodes of The Search
Date	Topic	Institution	Summary
October 17, 1954	Treatment of stuttering	State University of Iowa	Wendell Johnson's Speech Clinic examined causes of stuttering and demonstrated therapy that helped to overcome that problem.
October 24, 1954	Recovery from disaster	University of Texas	Sociologist Harry E. Moore led a study of the effects of the tornadoes in Waco, Texas, in 1953 to find out how people reacted to that disaster and how they recovered from its effects.
November 7, 1954	Prison methods	San Quentin Prison	Austin MacCormick and students from the University of California's graduate school of criminology conducted research at San Quentin seeking ways to change prison procedures so that inmates would live better lives after they were released.
November 21, 1954	Machines that think	Massachusetts Institute of Technology	Norbert Wiener and Donald O. Campbell headed a report about development of machines that "now are beginning to take over duties once performed exclusively by the human nervous system". The episode included a tour of laboratories involved in developing the new technology.
November 28, 1954	Changes in studying weather	University of Chicago	Horace R. Byers led the Cloud Physics Project in a study of possible improvements in studying weather. The episode included footage from aboard a weather plane as it flew into a thunderhead and into the eye of a hurricane. It also showed a plane seeding a cumulus cloud with dry ice to create rain.
December 5, 1954	Normalcy in children	Yale University	Yale's Child Study Center, directed by Milton Senn, sought to find out what made parents satisfied and children happy. Scenes were filmed at Yale and at Grace-New Haven Community Hospital.
December 12, 1954	Research about beef cattle	Texas Agriculture & Mechanical College	Scenes of "typical ranch life" in Texas supplemented academic segments.
December 26, 1954	Earthquakes	Fordham University	Father Joseph Lynch explained how seismological equipment records earthquake activity from anywhere in the world.
January 2, 1955	Inadequate facilities in schools	Harvard University	Cyril Sargent, director of the Center for Field Studies in Harvard's School of Education used a field trip to Massachusetts to illustrate the center's techniques for determining a school's needs.
January 23, 1955	Efforts to measure and improve vision	Ohio State University	Viewers saw how Samuel Renshaw and others in Ohio State's visual research section of experimental psychology used tests and equipment to improve vision.
January 30, 1955	Helping a paraplegic war veteran recover	Bellevue Medical Center	A veteran was shown as he progressed at the Institute of Physical Medicine and Rehabilitation after a bullet severed his spine during the Korean War.
February 6, 1955	Uranium rush in Colorado	Colorado School of Mines	Professor Paul Keating was the guide as viewers accompanied prospectors seeking uranium in a 65,000 square-miles plateau in the Rocky Mountains. Steps included staking out a claim, recording a claim, and assaying the prospectors' findings.
February 13, 1955	Extending people's life spans	University of Illinois Urbana-Champaign	Dr. Thomas K. Cureton demonstrated aspects of the university's Physical Fitness Research Center, which used 128 measurements of a person's fitness and recommended ways to improve his or her physical condition and "lower physiological age". Bob Richards, who held the Olympic pole-vault record, spoke about how his training at the center helped him to set that record.
February 20, 1955	Harmful effects of noise	University of California, Los Angeles	Vern Oliver Knudsen and an associate talked about harmful effects of noise and gave a tour of UCLA's Acoustics Laboratory to show efforts to combat such problems.
February 27, 1955	Heart disease	University of Minnesota	In the seventh year of a study of 500 men, researchers related efforts to diminish the number of deaths (nearly 1 million adult Americans annually) that resulted from cardiovascular disorders.
March 13, 1955	Increasing divorce rate	Marriage Council of Philadelphia	The council was an affiliate of the University of Pennsylvania School of Medicine, Its director, Emily Mudd, explained how it functioned and what it found as major causes of marital problems. Viewers saw clips of people explaining why they had turned to the council for help.
March 20, 1955	Racial problems in Baltimore	Fisk University	People interviewed included Dr. Herman H. Long, who headed Fisk University's months-long study of race relations in Baltimore, and Rabbi Israel M. Goldman, who chaired a self-survey of the community.
March 27, 1955	A university's inclusion of community	University of Louisville	Dr. Philip Grant Davidson related how the University of Louisville and the local board of education and public library coordinated efforts to make the university's resources available to people throughout the community.

== Production ==
The Search had three mobile camera crews and a 10-person staff based in New York. Content of episodes was filmed on location with the focus on people involved in research, affected by results of research, or both. Development of a report sometimes took as much as six months, and production of an episode required eight to 12 weeks. Each episode's writer lived on the relevant campus for two weeks in order to collect information and create the script. Each script was reviewed and revised in New York for one week, after which it went to the university for review by officials there. After changes from the university were made, the director and reporter spent several days on the campus before the film production crew arrived for two weeks' work. The episode was completed with film processing and editing in New York.

Irv Gitlin was the producer. Directors included Heinwar Rodakiewicz and Franklin Schaffner. Writers included Stephen Fleischman, Al Wasserman, and Arthur Zegart. Ben Ludlow directed the music.

Initially the series was broadcast on Sundays at 4:30 p.m. Eastern Time. Effective July 12, 1955, it was moved to Tuesdays from 10:30 to 11 p.m. Eastern Time.

== Critical response ==
A review in The New York Times said that The Search demonstrated that educational television could "hold its own on merit as a rewarding and exciting experience in viewing". The review noted that the program went beyond where many broadcast documentaries stopped: in addition to presenting problems, The Search suggested ways to deal with them. It said that the show's method was as important as its material and concluded, "The absence of any trace of theatricalism is the best evidence of intelligent showmanship of The Search."

Jo Coppola, in a review in Newsday, called the premiere episode "rather intriguing" as it explored causes and treatments of stuttering. Citing other topics that the series was going to present, she wrote, "If nothing else, the material into which The Search will delve is downright fascinating and — more important — it doesn't take an Einstein or a Ph.D. to understand it."

== Recognition ==
The Search was named the best educational series in the 1954 Sylvania Television Awards. Also in 1954 the program received a special Peabody Award as "... an educational program of high merit and splendid purpose, relating visually and with objective enthusiasm the great research work being done in the universities and colleges of our land to improve the lot of man ...".
