= Stuart Byron =

American film critic (1941–1991)

Stuart Byron (May 9, 1941 – December 13, 1991) was an American film critic and gay rights activist.

He attended public schools in New York, then matriculated at Wesleyan University - studying history and joining EQV Fraternity before graduating in 1963. For two years after graduation he was associate editor of the Independent Film Journal, then spent several years as a publicist for Pathé and Avco/Embassy, plus a year as assistant to the president for motion pictures at Natoma Productions. In 1982, Byron moved from New York to Los Angeles to take on the position of creative affairs executive for Ray Stark at Rastar Productions until 1984.

In the 1960s, Byron worked for a year as a reporter and reviewer for Variety, and in 1971 he became the film-review columnist for The Village Voice at a time when the American film art and the dialogue surrounding it were being completely revised. Byron's resume, and his platform at the culturally-influential weekly made certain his voice was heard among the new wave of film-critics. Indeed, his substantial essays also frequently began to appear in On Film, Film Comment, Rolling Stone, The New York Times, Harper's, Movie, Creem, and New York, among others. Byron also became well known for his "World's Hardest Movie Quiz" features in The Village Voice (which briefly returned to the paper in his memory from 1999 to 2004), and later for his "Rules of the Game" columns. He also achieved national notoriety for remarks made in 1981, when he accused critic Pauline Kael of making homophobic comments in her reviews.

He is the co-editor (with Elisabeth Weis) of the book "The National Society of Film Critics on Movie Comedy", published in 1976.

Byron was one of the first openly gay film critics in New York, coming-out publicly in one of his first reviews in the Village Voice (February 18, 1971). He was active in the Gay Activists Alliance as well as National Gay Task Force. Aside from a brief sojourn in Boston, he was a New York City resident until 1982, when he moved to Los Angeles to work for Stark. Although he returned to writing in 1984, he remained in California for the rest of his life; his work regularly appeared in LA Weekly, and the gay news magazine The Advocate. He died December 13, 1991, from complications resulting from AIDS.

His papers are held at the Wesleyan Film Archives at Wesleyan University.
