= Science in Action (TV series) =

US television program

Science in Action is a weekly half-hour television program devoted to science. The program was produced by the California Academy of Sciences, and was broadcast from 1950 to 1966. It was thus among the first live science television program in the United States; The Johns Hopkins Science Review was broadcast from 1948 to 1955, and is apparently the very first such program. In all, 566 programs were produced. Dr. Tom Groody hosted the program for its first two years; he was succeeded by Dr. Earl S. Herald, who was the host for the following fourteen years until production ceased in 1966.

Marcel LaFollette has written, "Production approaches that are now standard practice on NOVA and the Discovery Channel derive, in fact, from experimentation by television pioneers like Lynn Poole and Don Herbert and such programs as Adventure, Zoo Parade, Science in Action, and the Bell Telephone System’s science specials. These early efforts were also influenced by television’s love of the dramatic, refined during its first decade and continuing to shape news and public affairs programming, as well as fiction and fantasy, today." LaFollette included the program in her 2008 overview of early broadcasting devoted to science popularization.
