= Virginia Bell (filmmaker) =

American film director

Virginia Bell (who often worked under the name Tracy Ward) was one of the few women film directors and producers of sponsored and industrial films in the mid-20th century.

== Career ==
Virginia Bell and her husband Robert (Bob) Bell established On Film, Inc. in Princeton, New Jersey in 1951. On Film had ties to the avant-garde film community including Stan Brakhage, Willard van Dyke, Len Lye, Weegee, and Stan Vanderbeek. Industrial film historian Rick Prelinger has written regarding Bell's contributions to industrial films,"Virginia Bell, who was known professionally by the name Tracy Ward, a gender-neutral pseudonym, was an incredibly important person in this area and her films are very distinctive works."

Bell's industrial film Color and Texture in Aluminum Finishes (1956), which celebrates the versatility of the material, was described by film critic Howard Thompson as “probably the most strikingly imaginative industrial short subject ever filmed in the United States.” The film, on which Bell served as co-director, producer, and writer, is among select industrial films preserved by the National Film Preservation Foundation. "Ward’s attention to transparency and opacity, to interrogation of form, and to color fields," noted scholar Dr. Jocelyn Szczepaniak-Gillece are "[t]he very stylistic aspects that made Ward’s films avant-garde" and reflected a distinctive modernist sensibility in industrial films.

In the Suburbs was sponsored by the magazine Redbook, with cinematographer Bert Spielvogel. The Pittsburgh Bicentennial Association commissioned On Film to create a commemorative film Pittsburgh that was not officially completed and described by one scholar as a "sponsored documentary film with a radical aesthetic grafted onto a text that is otherwise deployed in the service of local capital."

Bell later worked with Audio Productions, for whom she directed films such as With a Woman in Mind and If the Salt Had Lost its Savor. A trade publication commented in 1967 on the industrial film about floor coverings sponsored by Armstrong Cork Company, "With a Woman in Mind demonstrates that there is a definite difference in the approach of a woman director trying to motivate women. . . Because the film was expertly directed by a woman, Tracy Ward who was herself turned on by the product, the result is an almost psychedelic excursion through a world of color."

In If the Salt Had Lost its Savor, Ward uses a somewhat unconventional approach to this industrial film intended to stir religious involvement that was sponsored by the United Presbyterian Church—the cinema verite style "to achieve a documentary immediacy and intimacy that strips the extraneous elements — of technique, of film convention—away from the bare bedrock issue."

== Filmography ==
- Color and Texture in Aluminum Finishes (1956), sponsored by the Aluminum Company of America
- In the Suburbs (1957)
- The Relaxed Wife (1957), sponsored by Pfizer & Co.
- Conversation Crossroads (1958), sponsored by Bell System
- Pittsburgh (1959)
- Someone's In the Kitchen (1961)
- If the Salt Has Lost lts Savor (1968) sponsored by Westminster Press
- The Movie Experience: A Matter of Choice (1968) with Charleton Heston as the narrator
- Threshold. . .Research and the Care of People (1970), in which "the intangible world of anesthesiology is made dramatically real for the lay public and the medical profession," sponsored by the National Institute of General Medical Sciences and awarded a gold medal at the Atlanta International Film Festival
- With a Woman in Mind, sponsored by Armstrong Cork Company
