= 1952 Sylvania Television Awards =

Sylvania Award
- Sponsored by: Sylvania Electric Products
- Date: December 11, 1952
- Location: New York City
- Country: United States

The 1952 Sylvania Television Awards were presented on December 11, 1952, at Hotel Pierre in New York City. The Sylvania Awards were established in 1951 by Sylvania Electric Products. Deems Taylor was the chairman of the judges committee.

The following awards were presented:

- Grand award - Victory at Sea, NBC, Henry Solomon, producer; award accepted by Secretary of the Navy Dan A. Kimball and NBC president Joseph H. McConnell
- Best comedy program - I Love Lucy
- Best dramatic series - Robert Montgomery Presents
- Best documentary melodramas - Treasury Men in Action
- Best program of current news - See It Now
- Most noteworthy contributions to variety shows - Toast of the Town, CBS
- Outstanding sports telecasts - 1952 World Series, with awards to NBC and the Gillette Safety Razor Company, with citations to the remote camera crews of WPIX and WOR-TV, for initiating telecasts of the 1952 World Series
- Definite contribution to creative TV technique - Broadway Television Theatre, WOR-TV, New York
- Public service in giving the country's youth its program - Youth Wants To Know, NBC
- Best local public service series - The Whole Town's Talking and In Our Care, WOI-TV at Iowa State College, Ames, Iowa
- Best and most original children's program - Summer School, WCAU, Philadelphia
- Best special events coverage - The four networks and the three sponsors (Admiral, Motorola, and Philco) for coverage of the 1952 political campaigns
- Best in commercials - Standard Oil of New Jersey
- For pioneering and developing daytime TV - DuMont Television Network and Sylvester L. Weaver Jr., NBC

No awards were made for best actor and actress, as the committee noted that the best performances came "from guest stars borrowed from the legitimate stage or motion pictures."
