= Zoo Parade =

American television program

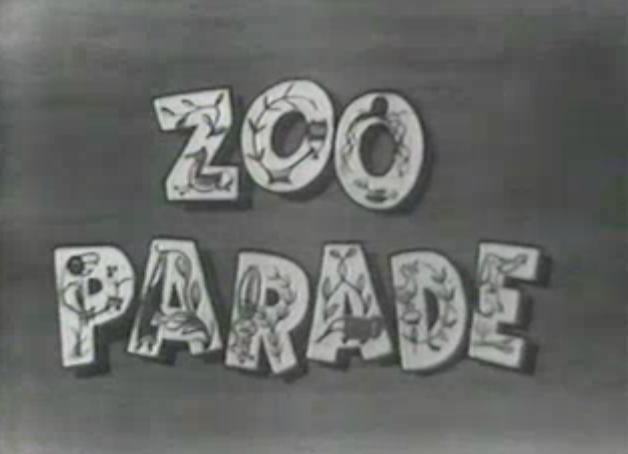
- Genre: Education, nature
- Directed by: Don Meier
- Presented by: Marlin Perkins, Jim Hurlbut
- Country of origin: United States
- Original language: English
- No. of seasons: 8

Production
- Producer: Don Meier
- Production location: Lincoln Park Zoo
- Running time: 30 minutes
- Production company: NBC

Original release
- Network: NBC
- Release: May 28, 1950 – September 1, 1957

Related
- Wild Kingdom

Zoo Parade is an American television program broadcast from 1950 to 1957 that featured animals from the Lincoln Park Zoo in Chicago. Presented by Marlin Perkins, the show was broadcast on Sunday afternoons on NBC.

== History ==
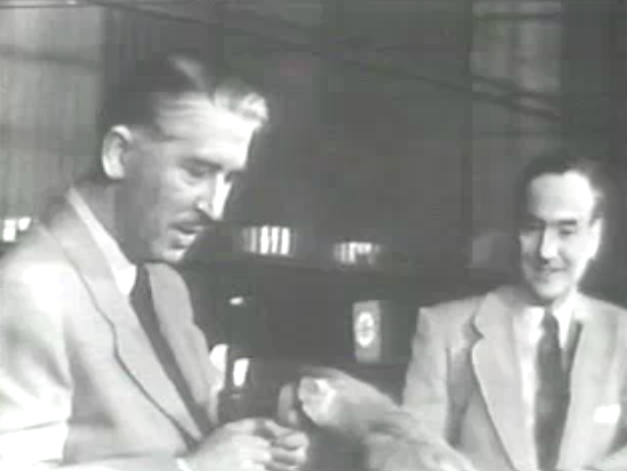
Marlin Perkins, at left, feeds a macaw during a 1954 episode.

The show was first broadcast locally in Chicago as Lincoln Park Zoo in 1949, appearing in television listings for WNBQ as early as May, and using the Zoo Parade name by December. It was then broadcast nationally by NBC on Sunday afternoons from May 1950 to September 1957.

Shot primarily at the Lincoln Park Zoo in Chicago, the zoo's director, Marlin Perkins, was a presenter throughout the series; he was assisted by announcer Jim Hurlbut (Note: Hurlbut, a Marine Corps veteran of the Guadalcanal campaign, died in 1967 at age 57.) for several seasons. Harrison Ford, born in 1942, recalled meeting Perkins during the run of the show, as Ford's father was in advertising and had the zoo as a client. Perkins was bitten on a finger by a rattlesnake shortly before the episode of April 1, 1951, resulting in his hospitalization—a zoologist hosted the episode in his place.

The series was primarily filmed in black and white, although a safari episode first aired in December 1955 was filmed in color. Some episodes in the fall of 1955 were shot on location in other U.S. cities. The show was canceled in the fall of 1957 and replaced with an interview show, Look Here, hosted by Martin Agronsky. Perkins went on to host the program Wild Kingdom, which debuted in 1963.

A board game entitled Marlin Perkins' Zoo Parade was issued in 1955 by maker Cadaco-Ellis of Chicago, which involved two to four players answering questions about animals of North America, South America, Asia, and Africa. Examples of the game can sometimes be found via online auction sites.

== Awards ==
The show won a Peabody Award in the area of children's programming for 1950 (awarded in 1951), and a Sylvania Award in 1951 as the "best program suitable for children." The show received four nominations for Emmy Awards:

- 1951 (for 1950): Best Educational Show (won by KFI-TV University)
- 1953 (for 1952): Best Children's Program (won by Time for Beany)
- 1954 (for 1953): Best Children's Program (won by Kukla, Fran and Ollie)
- 1955 (for 1954): Best Children's Program (won by Lassie)

== Legacy ==
Jim Wehmeyer has described the show: "A precursor of sorts to the regularly featured animal segments on The Tonight Show and other late-night talk shows, Zoo Parade was a location-bound production (filmed in the reptile house basement) during which Perkins would present and describe the life and peculiarities of Lincoln Park Zoo animals."

Marcel LaFollette has written, "Production approaches that are now standard practice on NOVA and the Discovery Channel derive, in fact, from experimentation by television pioneers like Lynn Poole and Don Herbert and such programs as Adventure, Zoo Parade, Science in Action, and the Bell Telephone System’s science specials. These early efforts were also influenced by television’s love of the dramatic, refined during its first decade and continuing to shape news and public affairs programming, as well as fiction and fantasy, today."
