= Sylvania Award =

- Sponsored by: Sylvania Electric Products
- Date: 1951–1959
- Country: United States

The Sylvania Awards were given by the television manufacturer Sylvania Electric Products for various categories of television performance, broadcasting, scripts, music and other aspects of production between 1951 and 1959. In their day they rivaled the Emmy Award for prestige. They came to an end after the sponsor was merged into GTE.

== History ==
Sylvania Electric Products, a television set manufacturer, gave the annual Sylvania Awards from 1951. The awards were given for advancing creative television techniques. The Sylvania Award was as prestigious as the Emmy Award in the early days of television. It was one of several developed in the 1950s after the Emmy award was founded in 1949. Others included the TV Guide Award and the Look Magazine TV Award. Ed Sullivan gave out the Michael award in Los Angeles from 1950 to 1953.

In 1951 the Sylvania award for best program suitable for children was given to Zoo Parade by the National Congress of Parents and Teachers, headed by Mrs. Johnny Hays. The awards for 1953 were presented in New York on 1 December 1953, with winners announced in advance. No grand award was presented. Winners included Rod Steiger (actor) and Paddy Chayefsky (script) for Marty, Donald O'Connor, Danny Thomas and Mary Martin. The 1955 awards were presented by broadcaster Deems Taylor on 29 November 1955. Sylvester L. Weaver Jr., head of NBC, received an award.

1957 Sylvania Television Award winners included Mary Martin, Dinah Shore, Marian Anderson, Steve Allen and Jack Paar. The 1958 awards were presented in January 1959 at a ceremony in the Grand Ballroom of the Plaza Hotel in Manhattan attended by about 400 guests including performers and representatives of networks, TV stations and production companies. Comedian Orson Bean was the master of ceremonies. The awards were presented by Don G. Mitchell, chairman and president of Sylvania Electric Products. In 1959 Sylvania Electric Products merged with General Telephone to form General Telephone and Electronics (GTE). The awards for 1959 were the last.

== Trophy ==
The award winners received a trophy in the form of a clock. A walnut wood base is decorated by a high-relief sculpture of a woman in a robe who carries the clock face on her shoulders. The face is made of glass, with etched gilt stars at each hour and stylized metal lightning bolts for hands. Some versions of the award were functioning electric clocks made by Jefferson Electric Company of Bellwood, Illinois. In others the clock hands were permanently attached to the glass face. The clock was about 14 inches (360 mm) tall, made by the Medallic Art Co. of New York, NY.

== Awards ==
Complete listings of award winners are set forth at:

- 1951 Sylvania Television Awards
- 1952 Sylvania Television Awards
- 1953 Sylvania Television Awards
- 1954 Sylvania Television Awards
- 1955 Sylvania Television Awards
- 1956 Sylvania Television Awards
- 1957 Sylvania Television Awards
- 1958 Sylvania Television Awards
- 1959 Sylvania Television Awards

== Sources ==
- Broughton, Irv (1986-09-01). Producers on Producing: The Making of Film and Television. McFarland. ISBN 978-0-7864-1207-5.
- Cox, Jim (2009-07-01). American Radio Networks: A History. McFarland. ISBN 978-0-7864-5424-2.
- Gillan, Jennifer (2014-11-20). Television Brandcasting: The Return of the Content-Promotion Hybrid. Routledge. ISBN 978-1-135-02062-0.
- Kramer, Alisa Sarah (2007). William H. Parker and the Thin Blue Line: Politics, Public Relations and Policing in Postwar Los Angeles. ISBN 978-0-549-28990-6.
- Macfarlane, Malcolm; Crossland, Ken (2009-07-06). Perry Como: A Biography and Complete Career Record. McFarland. ISBN 978-0-7864-7166-9.
- Mitman, Gregg (2012-09-01). Reel Nature: America's Romance with Wildlife on Film. University of Washington Press. ISBN 978-0-295-80372-2.
- Nate D. Sanders (2013). "Extraordinarily Rare 1956 Sylvania Award Presented to Bob Keeshan for Captain Kangaroo -- Considered the Pre-Cursor of the Emmy Awards".
- Nielsen Business Media (1953-12-05). Billboard. Nielsen Business Media, Inc. ISSN 0006-2510.
- Newcomb, Horace (2014-02-03). Encyclopedia of Television. Taylor & Francis. ISBN 978-1-135-19479-6.
- Reed, R.M.; Reed, M.K. (2012-12-06). The Encyclopedia of Television, Cable, and Video. Springer Science & Business Media. ISBN 978-1-4684-6521-1.
- Schmidt, Duane A. (2002). Iowa Pride. Xulon Press. ISBN 978-1-59160-134-0.
- "Sylvania Award-1952". Reverse Time Page.
- "Sylvania Award dinner Thursday". The Afro American. 1959-01-24.
- "Sylvania Awards Tell History of Television". Pittsburgh Post-Gazette. 1960-08-21.
- University of California (1958). University Bulletin: A Weekly Bulletin for the Staff of the University of California. Office of Official Publications, University of California.
- Watts, Steven (2001-10-01). The Magic Kingdom: Walt Disney and the American Way of Life. University of Missouri Press. ISBN 978-0-8262-1379-2.
- ""What's My Line/Sylvania Award 1953" Clock". Hake's Americana & Collectibles.
- "Winners of Sylvania Television Awards 1954". Corbis Corporation.
- Yankee, Luke (2006). Just Outside the Spotlight: Growing Up with Eileen Heckart. Back Stage Books. ISBN 978-0-8230-7888-2.
