= Lynn Poole =

American television host and author

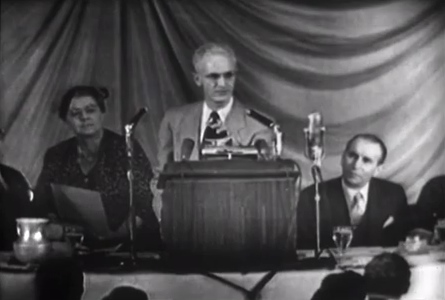
- Poole at the 1952 Peabody Awards
- Born: Lynn D. Poole; August 11, 1910; Eagle Grove, Iowa, US
- Died: April 14, 1969; Los Angeles, California
- Education: Western Reserve University
- Occupations: Writer, television personality, public relations officer
- Employer: The Johns Hopkins University

Lynn D. Poole (August 11, 1910 – April 14, 1969) was the creator and host of an early U.S. science television program, The Johns Hopkins Science Review (1948–1955), and the author of more than 20 popular science books. In 2002, Patrick Lucanio and Gary Coville wrote that "In retrospect, Lynn Poole created one of those unique series that allowed television to fulfill its idealized mission as both an educational and an entertainment medium." The "pioneering program" made Poole a "surprise star". Marcel LaFollette argues that contemporary science television such as NOVA and the Discovery Channel are derived from the innovations of Poole and others.

Poole was born in Eagle Grove, Iowa. He received his bachelor's degree from Western Reserve University in 1936, and a master's degree in 1937. In 1938 he joined the staff of the Walters Art Museum in Baltimore, where he directed the education department. In 1941 he married Gray Johnson, then working as a journalist at The Evening Sun. Following service during World War II as a public relations officer for the VII Bomber Command, in 1946 he joined Johns Hopkins University as its first director of public relations.

== The Johns Hopkins Science Review ==
Poole began producing the weekly, live television program The Johns Hopkins Science Review in 1948. Poole was not educated as a scientist, but he nonetheless wrote most of the programs, and acted as its on-air host and interviewer. As LaFollete describes it, he was a "new phenotype" and "created the persona of the scientist's facile promoter and authoritative interpreter." Each week's half-hour show typically introduced one or more guests, often from the Johns Hopkins faculty and staff. The guest might show how a scientific apparatus such an electron microscope or an oscilloscope worked, or would briefly explain scientific ideas to the viewers. In the December 5, 1950 episode, the live broadcast of a fluoroscope screen was used by doctors in New York and Chicago to diagnose the injuries to a machinist in the hospital in Baltimore. This show demonstrated the medical possibilities both of the fluoroscope and of television itself. In the April 21, 1952 episode, a scientist drank a solution containing the radioactive isotope of iodine, and then followed its progress in his own body with a Geiger counter. Poole then visited England to film a three-part series "An American Looks at Science in England". He occasionally did demonstrations himself, such as climbing a TV transmitter mast or eating a grasshopper on live television. The guests included national figures like rocket scientist Wernher von Braun (October 20, 1952). Some shows served as conduits for public information, as in the show of April 3, 1951 on biological warfare, which featured Norman Kiefer of the Federal Civil Defense Administration.

Lucanio and Coville have written, "What is unique about the series is that in a time of political and social conservatism, Science Review tackled controversial issues with a seeming lack of concern for any possible repercussions. While other shows sidestepped the use of the word "pregnant", for example, Science Review was amazingly forthright in showing the first live birth on television. In a related episode, Science Review presented a straightforward program demonstrating to women viewers how to examine themselves for breast cancer, and then went on to talk frankly about mastectomies."

From 1950 to 1955, the program was syndicated nationally by the DuMont Television Network, and won Peabody Awards in 1950 (honorable mention) and 1952. Poole produced three successor series through 1960, when Johns Hopkins ended production. Kinescope films survived for many episodes of these series, which is unusual for early live television. Copies have been archived at the Johns Hopkins library.

Poole documented the techniques he developed for television programming devoted to science in a 1950 book, Science via Television. LaFollette notes that, "Production approaches that are now standard practice on NOVA and the Discovery Channel derive, in fact, from experimentation by television pioneers like Lynn Poole and Don Herbert and such programs as Adventure, Zoo Parade, Science in Action, and the Bell Telephone System's science specials. These early efforts were also influenced by television's love of the dramatic, refined during its first decade and continuing to shape news and public affairs programming, as well as fiction and fantasy, today."

== Writing career ==
Poole was also a prolific author, mostly of popular and young adult books about science. An early title related to several episodes of the Science Review program was Your Trip into Space (1953). A second volume that was noted in The New York Times was Science: The Super Sleuth (1954), which was about forensic science. Many of his books were published after his television work ceased in 1960.

Poole and his wife Gray Johnson Poole wrote at least 16 nonfiction books together, beginning in 1960 with Scientists Who Changed the World, published by Dodd, Mead in its Makers of Our Modern World series. The Pooles also published at least one novel, The Magnificent Traitor; a Novel of Alcibiades and the Golden Age of Pericles (1968). One Passion, Two Loves; the story of Heinrich and Sophia Schliemann, discoverers of Troy (Crowell, 1966) is their work most widely held in WorldCat libraries.

Poole retired from Johns Hopkins in 1965, but continued his writing career. Poole died of a heart attack in 1969, at the age of 58. He'd had the first of several heart attacks in 1957, and of course had published a book, I am a Chronic Cardiac (1964), about his experiences.

Gray Poole wrote at least four more books that were published during the 1970s.

The de Grummond Children's Literature Collection at the University of Southern Mississippi in Hattiesburg holds an unprocessed collection of the papers of Lynn and Gray Johnson Poole.
