= 1957 Sylvania Television Awards =

1957 TV awards show hosted by Don Ameche

Sylvania Award
- Sponsored by: Sylvania Electric Products
- Date: January 15, 1958
- Location: New York City
- Country: United States

The 1957 Sylvania Television Awards were presented on January 15, 1958, at the Plaza Hotel in New York City. Don Ameche was the master of ceremonies. The Sylvania Awards were established by Sylvania Electric Products.

The committee presented the following awards:

== Special awards ==
- Face the Nation for its interview of Nikita Khrushchev
- See It Now for its program based on Marian Anderson's goodwill tour abroad
- Mary Martin and Richard Halliday for NBC's presentation of Annie Get Your Gun
- NBC Opera Theatre for "creative achievement in imaginative presentation of classical music"
- Wide Wide World for "outstanding creative coverage of educational subjects"

== Category awards ==
- Original teleplay - William Gibson for The Miracle Worker, Playhouse 90
- Television adaptation - James Lee for The Life of Samuel Johnson on Omnibus
- Actor - Lee J. Cobb in No Deadly Medicine on Studio One
- Actress - Kim Stanley in Traveling Lady on Studio One
- Supporting role actor - Torin Thatcher in Beyond This Place on DuPont Show of the Month
- Supporting role actress - Patty McCormack in The Miracle Worker
- Dramatic series - Hallmark Hall of Fame
- New series - The Twentieth Century
- Documentary series - See It Now
- Network news - NBC
- Public service series - U.N. in Action
- Variety series - The Steve Allen Show
- Comedy series - Jack Paar's Tonight
- Daytime series - Matinee Theater
- Light musical series - The Dinah Shore Chevy Show
- Children's series - Let's Take a Trip
- Religious series - Look Up and Live
- Educational series - Omnibus
