= On Film =

American film production company, 1950–60s

On Film Inc. was an American industrial film production company in the 1950-60s known for its innovative and award-winning creative productions and advertisements and its roster of talented filmmakers and documentarians. Scholar Dr. Jocelyn Szczepaniak-Gillece described On Film Inc. as "making lightly surreal films with plays on surfaces, tints, and music . . . with a playful approach of color, light, and texture rather than narrative coherence."

Robert (Bob) Bell led the firm, along with his wife Virginia Bell (who also went by Tracy Ward) in operations and creative leadership roles. The film company was headquartered in Princeton, New Jersey and established in 1951. It soon started was producing motion pictures and slide films that were sponsored by local and federal government agency, industrial, medical, and commercial clients.

Another distinguishing feature of the company was that "On Film rarely promoted a single creator; instead, the production unit worked together as a team and was acknowledged as such, illustrating the left-leaning collectivist politics embraced by much of the company and the avant-garde artists they often hired." Noted filmmakers associated with the company include Bert Spielvogel, Stan Brakhage, Willard van Dyke, Len Lye, Stan Vanderbeek, Marcel Rebiere, Richard Miller, Richard Bagley, Hugh and Suzanne Johnston, and Weegee.

Its commercials, such as "Qualities of Aluminum," for the Aluminum Company Of America, were notable for its experimental style and striking visuals. Other ad clients and campaigns included Ivory soap, NBC ("Strangers into Customers"), Johnson & Johnson, American Airlines ("Alice in Wonderland," 1962), and Newsweek Magazine ("Communicative People," 1957).

== Filmography ==
- Sutures since Lister (1942), for Ethicon Suture Division of Johnson and Johnson
- The Rh Factor (1954), for the ORTHO RESEARCH FOUNDATION, and supervised by Dr. Philip Levine, Lasker Award winner and discoverer of the Rh factor
- Your Home As You Like It (1956), sponsored by Pittsburgh Plate Glass Co.
- Color and Texture in Aluminum Finishes (1956), sponsored by the Aluminum Company of America
- In the Suburbs
- Radio Free Europe (1956), through the cooperation of the United Stales Department of Defense and sponsored by the Crusade for Freedom
- The Relaxed Wife (1957), sponsored by Pfizer & Co.
- Conversation Crossroads (1958), sponsored by Bell System
- Tie Tie Go-Round (1959), sponsored by the Chicago Printed String Co, Chris certificate in 7th Annual Columbus (Ohio) Film Festival
- Aluminum Is Not Only Aluminum (1959)
- The New Girl (1960), distributed by the President's Committee on Government Contracts, top award Citizenship and Government films, American Film Festival
- Pittsburgh (1959), commissioned by the Pittsburgh Bicentennial Association
- The Kitchen Keyboard (1961), sponsored by R.T. French
- Someone's in the Kitchen (1961), sponsored by General Foods, Award to a Motion Picture Reflecting the Corporate Image
- What is a Painting? (1963), sponsored by Book of the Month Club, Silver Award, San Francisco International Film Festival
- Did You Hear What I Said? (1966)
