= 1953 Sylvania Television Awards =

Sylvania Award
- Sponsored by: Sylvania Electric Products
- Date: December 1, 1953
- Location: New York City
- Country: United States

The 1953 Sylvania Television Awards were presented on December 1, 1953, at Hotel Pierre in New York City. The Sylvania Awards were established by Sylvania Electric Products. The awards were selected by a committee of 16 judges led by Deems Taylor.

The Ford 50th Anniversary Show, a two-hour variety show broadcast simultaneously on both CBS and NBC received four special awards for producer Leland Hayward, director Clark Jones, choreographer Jerome Robbins, and Mary Martin for her work on the 50 years of fashion sketch.

The following additional awards were presented:

- Grand award - omitted
- Outstanding television actor - Rod Steiger, Marty, The Philco Television Playhouse (NBC)
- Best script written directly for television - Paddy Chayefsky, Marty, The Philco Television Playhouse (NBC)
- Outstanding comedy series - Make Room for Daddy starring Danny Thomas (ABC)
- Law enforcement documentary series - Dragnet, Jack Webb (NBC)
- Best adaptation for TV - Irving Gaynor Nieman for Appointment in Samara, on Robert Montgomery Presents (NBC)
- Timely news coverage - Coronation of Elizabeth II, film recordings originated by BBC, retransmitted by the CBC in Canada and relayed to ABC in the United States
- Outstanding panel show - What's My Line? (CBS)
- Outstanding achievement in a field of juvenile education - Ding Dong School and its "Miss Frances" (Dr. Frances Horwich) (NBC)
- Most versatile outstanding variety performance - Donald O'Connor, The Colgate Comedy Hour (NBC)
- Most outstanding new series - Person to Person, Edward R. Murrow, producer and moderator (CBS)
- Outstanding local education program - Shakespeare on TV with Dr. Frank C. Baxter (KNXT, Los Angeles)
- Outstanding discussion program - The American Forum of the Air, Theodore Granik, producer (NBC)
- Advancement of creative television technique - TV-Radio Workshop of Ford Foundation which created Omnibus (CBS) and Excursion (NBC)

The committee issued a report criticizing the "repetition and loud volume of sound in commercials, lack of a fresh approach in programs, lack of simplicity in set design, and use of dubbed in recorded laughter in filmed programs."
