= The Relaxed Wife =

- Complete film
- Written by: film created by Coni Johnston; Mel London; Joseph Cole; Bert Spielvogel; Tracy Ward and by Rune Hagman; Dick Brophy; Delores Phox; M. Opelle; Jeanne Sharp; Herb Hagen
- Release date: 1957
- Running time: 13 minutes
- Country: US
- Language: English

The Relaxed Wife is a 13-minute live action American film produced in color for distribution during 1957. Structured in a form similar to the 1942–55 series of MGM's Pete Smith Specialty comedy short subjects, which were written and directed by those films' star Dave O'Brien, or to Warner Bros.' Joe McDoakes shorts which starred George O'Hanlon, the brief comedic episodes comprising The Relaxed Wife depict a wise, easygoing housewife calming her stress-filled husband. The film is a short version of a longer promotional production that described the benefits of Atarax, a tranquilizer that was marketed at the time.

== Plot ==
At the moment the title appears on the screen, a wide rubber band is shown being stretched to the limit until it snaps. The narrator opens with the words, "After the day's work and worries are done, what is more fun for a man than to come home to a quiet house with happy children and a loving spouse?" At that point, two noisy children, a boy and a girl, run into the bedroom where their father is in bed reading a thick book entitled "Relax Relax Relax!". Their mother, the "relaxed wife" of the title, tell them to be quiet. As they leave the girl says "goodnight mother, goodnight father", while the father scowls. The narrator, who recites most of his text in rhyming couplets, then states, "some attempts at relaxing prove quite taxing — no joking — the effort may be most provoking".

The wife offers the husband hot tea, but he gulps it instead of sipping it and has to run to the bathroom to spit it out. The wife takes the book away from him and looks for another title among the following books on the bedroom shelf, "Living with Tension", "Living Without Tension", "Relax 24 Hours a Day", "Relax 365 Days a Year" and the last one, "How to Relax" which she hands to him and goes to lie down on one of the bedroom's two beds, separated by a nightstand, on which she keeps her reading glasses and her own book, titled "Wife Killer" and, as the shocked husband glares at the cover, he sees the illustration of a man's hand holding a bloody knife over a woman's body.

As the narrator's soothing voice is heard reading from How to Relax, the audience sees stylized depictions of the husband's stress-filled life as he runs weaving in and out of gates similar to those used by Olympic skiers, arrives at his desk, which is piled high with papers, and starts answering a ringing phone, with a speeded-up voice at the other end continually badgering him. The signs placed around him state "THINK", "SMILE", "WORK" and "PLAN AHEAD", while the narrator explains, "although the feverish male is sure nobody else can have his troubles, we know his wife doesn't pass her days just blowing bubbles". The wife is then shown negotiating those same stylized gates, carrying a large basket filled with laundry, while the two noisy and boisterous children run and shout.

Returning to the husband reading How to Relax, the narrator compares tension to a mosquito that continually buzzes, but never alights so that it can be swatted. The husband contorts his face, waiting to complete the swat, as the narrator asks if the wait would make him "worried, anxious, fearful, tense, irritated, exhausted", which is what tension does to him. As he dozes off to the narrator's soporific voice, his wife lifts the book from his lap and he jolts awake. She then reads to him, "true relaxation comes from conquering both nervous and physical tensions by calming both mind and muscles…" He imagines himself back at his work desk with his head having a pressure cooker valve sticking out of it and boiling over at top with the three-level lettering — "world's worries / other folk's problems / my affairs". A competing pressure valve then appears on top of his head with three different levels — "perfect / my very best / good work".

The wife is shown at the ironing board next to an overflowing wicker laundry basket of clothes, needing to be ironed. She relaxes by shaking her hands to relieve tension, then rolling her shoulders and neck muscles. As she continues, the husband gets up and begins shadow boxing, but receives a knockout blow from an invisible opponent and stretches out on the carpeted bedroom floor, while the wife continues to read the book's helpful advice regarding muscle relaxation.

At that point, the narrator again takes over, explaining, "as for everything else, the Greeks had a word for this mental and physical state of bliss — Ataraxia was the term they chose to use for the opposite of anxiety, fatigue and blues. Ataraxia means peace of mind and that — even more than money — is what most of us want to find". Laboratory beakers are shown while the narrator tells us that "today, medical science recognizes that some folks aren't helped by relaxing exercises. In cases of difficult tension and nervous apprehension, doctors are now prescribing an Ataraxic medicine. It makes those who fear they're about to quit, feel like they're ready to begin — bidding their darkened spirits goodbye — with the calming peace of a cloudless sky. Of all the states throughout this nation, the happiest by far is the state of relaxation…"

The husband dreams that he is again at his desk, but is now able to neutralize newspaper banner headlines of bad news, with other banner headlines proclaiming counterbalancing good news. Also, when he stops chasing elusive dollar bills attached to fishhooks, the money-laden fishhooks come within easy reach. Now that he is relaxed, good healthy sleep will no longer be elusive. The wife finishes reading, becomes drowsy, kisses her sleeping husband and lays down in her own separate bed. The narrator concludes, "for those of us who succeed to changing our attitudes, have learned the secret — of mastering our moods."

== Production ==
The opening credits start with: "This Film Created By / Coni Johnston / Mel London / Joseph Cole / Bert Spielvogel / Tracy Ward", followed by a slide indicating "And By / Rune Hagman / Dick Brophy / Delores Phox / M. Opelle / Jeanne Sharp / Herb Hagens". The following shot depicts the title, below which is the text "Chas. Pfizer & Co., Inc. MCMLVII". The succeeding shot shows the additional text "A Public Service Presentation of J. B. Roerig and Company a Division Of Chas. Pfizer & Co., Inc."

== Background ==
The closing credits state, "PRODUCED IN PRINCETON BY A RELAXED ORGANIZATION", followed by the credit "On Film Inc" and a third credit indicating "A Public Service Presentation of J. B. Roerig and Company / If you have tension problems discuss them with your doctor". In 1957, at the time of this film's production, Pfizer Pharmaceuticals was marketing a hydroxyzine prescription drug, which had been given the brand name "Atarax".

The film's avant-garde sensibility, a bit unusual for a sponsored film, is characteristic of On Film's productions. "Set pieces like a laboratory with human hands rising from the middle of the table add to the fantastical atmosphere," notes one scholar. "Through the thirteen-minute runtime, Ward et al. deploy similarly fanciful imagery in order to connote a form of mental interiority."

This short, along with many others considered to be time-capsule chronicles of their period, has been frequently classified as camp and shown as filler within Turner Classic Movies' Saturday night-Sunday morning film showcase series, TCM Underground. While on the surface The Relaxed Wife seems to offer a portrait of traditional midcentury gender roles and compliant participation in capitalist, consumerist culture, it has also been argued that the film's "taste for the surreal suggests that all the things we are told to take very, very seriously—work, family stressors, productivity, money, the news—are best understood through a lens of humor and bemusement."
