= Palazzolo (surname) =

Palazzolo is an Italian surname. Notable people with the surname include:

- Jack Palazzolo, Australian association football player
- Jim Palazzolo, American football coach
- Luigi Maria Palazzolo (1827–1886), Italian Roman Catholic priest
- Tom Palazzolo (born 1937), American filmmaker, photographer and artist
- Vito Roberto Palazzolo (born 1947), Italian businessman
