= 1956 Sylvania Television Awards =

Sylvania Award
- Sponsored by: Sylvania Electric Products
- Date: December 6, 1956
- Location: New York City
- Country: United States

The 1956 Sylvania Television Awards were presented on December 6, 1955, at the Plaza Hotel in New York City. Don Ameche was the master of ceremonies. The Sylvania Awards were established by Sylvania Electric Products. Deems Taylor was the chairman of the committee of judges.

The committee presented the following awards:

- Best original teleplay - Requiem for a Heavyweight, Playhouse 90
- Best performance by an actor - Jack Palance, Requiem for a Heavyweight
- Best performance by an actress - Gracie Fields, The Old Lady Shows Her Medals
- Best performance by a supporting actor - Ed Wynn, Requiem for a Heavyweight
- Best performance by a supporting actress - Joan Loring, The Corn Is Green
- Best television adaption - A Night to Remember, Kraft Television Theatre
- Best technical production - A Night to Remember
- Outstanding dramatic series - Kraft Television Theatre
- Outstanding comedy show - The Ernie Kovacs Show
- Serious and musical series - NBC Opera Theatre
- Light musical production - The Bachelor
- New series - The Kaiser Aluminum Hour
- Variety show - The Ed Sullivan Show
- Documentary - Project 20
- Human interest program - The Long Way Home
- Educational series - Omnibus
- Public service program - Out of Darkness
- News and special events - See It Now
- Children's program - Captain Kangaroo
- Women's show - Matinee Theater
- Special award - ABC for its political convention coverage
- Special award - Robert Sarnoff, president of NBC for "outstanding contribution to music on television"
