= Youth Wants To Know =

American television program

- Country of origin: United States
- Original language: English

Original release
- Network: NBC
- Release: 1951 – 1957

Youth Wants To Know is a news and education television program broadcast on NBC from 1951 to 1957. It was presented in a panel format in which high school and college students were able to ask questions of noted persons in politics and business.

The program was developed by Theodore S. Granick, the producer of The American Forum of the Air.

In 1956, the program won the George Foster Peabody Award for youth and children's programs. It also won a public service award at the 1952 Sylvania Television Awards.
