= Dirtymouth =

1970 film

- Directed by: Herbert S. Altman
- Written by: Herbert S. Altman
- Produced by: Herbert S. Altman
- Starring: Bernie Travis; Courtney Simon; Wynn Irwin; Miss Sam Teardrop; Harry Spillman
- Cinematography: Bert Spielvogel
- Edited by: Edna Ruth Paul
- Music by: Lenny Hambro
- Distributed by: Superior Pictures
- Release date: September 1970
- Running time: 102 minutes
- Country: United States
- Language: English

Dirtymouth is a 1970 American biographic film of the comic Lenny Bruce, starring Bernie Travis and written and directed by Herbert S. Altman.

After Altman completed the film, it was the subject of a lawsuit by film producer Marvin Worth. Worth had obtained the film rights in two books written by Bruce, and he alleged that Altman's movie infringed the copyrights in those books. The court agreed that some of the content in the film was copyright infringement, and issued a preliminary injunction. Travis had also starred as Bruce in a stage production at The Village Gate in Greenwich Village; that production was also the subject of a copyright lawsuit by the executors of Bruce's estate.

The film eventually received some small critical attention before being eclipsed by Worth's much more famous 1974 film production Lenny, directed by Bob Fosse and starring Dustin Hoffman.

== See also ==
- List of American films of 1970
