= NBC White Paper =

1960-89 political documentary series

- Country of origin: United States
- Original language: English

Production
- Production company: NBC News

Original release
- Network: NBC
- Release: 1960 – 1989

NBC White Paper is a documentary television series on the NBC television network lasting from 1960 to 1989. Producer Arthur Zegart was nominated for an Emmy Award for the series in 1962.
