= Don Herbert =

American educational television host (1917–2007)

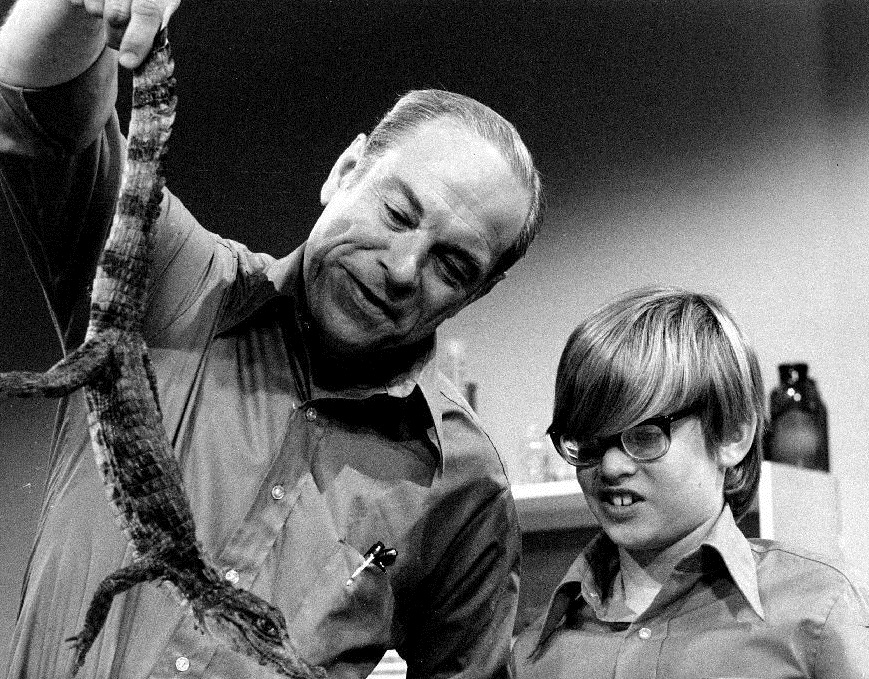
- Herbert in 1971
- Born: Donald Herbert Kemske; July 10, 1917; Waconia, Minnesota, U.S.
- Died: June 12, 2007 (aged 89); Bell Canyon, California, U.S.
- Education: La Crosse State Teachers College (BS)
- Occupation: TV host
- Known for: Mr. Wizard television programs
- Spouse(s): Maraleita Dutton (1939–1972); Norma Kasell (1972–2007; his death)

Donald Jeffry Herbert (born Donald Herbert Kemske; July 10, 1917 – June 12, 2007), better known as Mr. Wizard, was an American television host. He was the creator and host of Watch Mr. Wizard (1951–1965, 1971–1972) and Mr. Wizard's World (1983–1989), which were educational television programs for children devoted to science and technology. He also produced many short video programs about science and authored several popular books about science for children.

It was said that no fictional hero was able to rival the popularity and longevity of "the friendly, neighborly scientist". In Herbert's obituary, Bill Nye wrote, "Herbert's techniques and performances helped create the United States' first generation of homegrown rocket scientists just in time to respond to Sputnik. He sent us to the moon. He changed the world." Herbert is credited with turning "a generation of youth" in the 1950s and early 1960s on to "the promise and perils of science".

== Early life and education ==
Born Donald Herbert Kemske in Waconia, Minnesota, on July 10, 1917, he was one of three children born to Herbert and Lydia Kemske. He graduated from Central High School in La Crosse, Wisconsin, in 1935, where he played football and acted in school plays. Herbert enrolled at the University of Wisconsin–La Crosse, then called La Crosse State Teachers College, and majored in general science and English and was active in drama. He graduated in 1940 and officially changed his name to Donald Jeffry Herbert that same year. After graduation, he acted in summer stock (including performances alongside future First Lady Nancy Davis) and worked as a stagehand, a magician, a guide at Rockefeller Center, and a department manager at Macy's.

In 1942, during World War II, Herbert joined the United States Army Air Corps, took pilot training, and became a B-24 bomber pilot. He flew 56 combat missions from Italy with the 767th Bomb Squadron, 461st Bomb Group of the Fifteenth Air Force. When he was discharged in 1945, he was a captain. He earned the Distinguished Flying Cross and the Air Medal with three oak leaf clusters.

== Watch Mr. Wizard ==
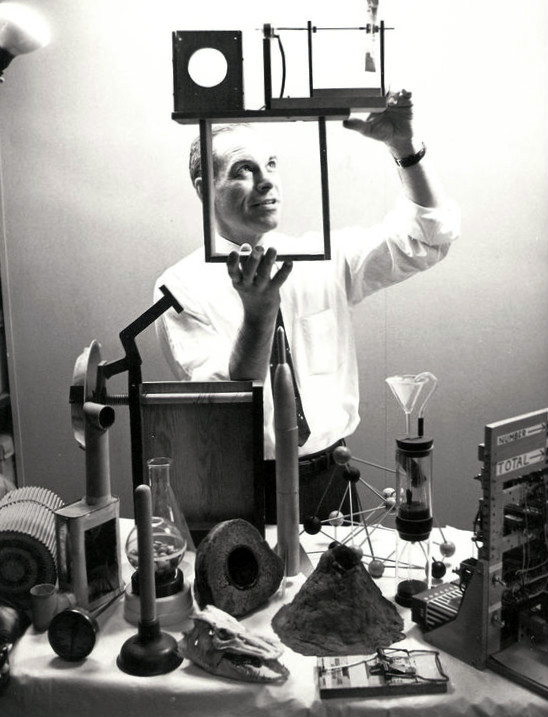
As Mr. Wizard in 1961

After the war, Herbert worked at a radio station in Chicago, where he acted in children's programs such as the documentary health series It's Your Life (1949). It was during this time that Herbert formulated the idea of Mr. Wizard and a general science experiments show that used the new medium of television. Herbert's idea was accepted by Chicago NBC station WNBQ. The series Watch Mr. Wizard premiered on March 3, 1951. The weekly half-hour live television show, co-produced by Jules Power, featured Herbert as Mr. Wizard and either a boy or a girl with whom Herbert performed interesting science experiments.

The experiments, many of which seemed impossible at first glance, were usually simple enough to be re-created by viewers. In the Chicago Tribune in 1951, Larry Wolters wrote that Herbert "believes that to educate youngsters in the marvels of science you must first entertain them. And he feels that he can win them over more readily with ordinary household props than with fancy instruments."

The show was very successful with 547 live episodes created before it was canceled in 1965. The program won a Peabody Award in 1953. Marcel LaFollette notes that, "At its peak, Watch Mr. Wizard drew about eight hundred thousand viewers per episode, but it had an even wider impact. By 1956 over five thousand "Mr. Wizard Science Clubs" had been established, with total membership over a hundred thousand. Teachers incorporated program themes into their classes, and "Mr. Wizard" science kits, books, and other product tie-ins filled the holiday gift lists of countless children."

The show was briefly revived for one season in 1971-72 as Mr. Wizard, produced in Canada by CJOH-TV in Ottawa. This series was seen on NBC and CBC Television in Canada.

Cory Buxton and Eugene Provenzo place Mr. Wizard in a 19th-century tradition of "hands-on kitchen science" associated with Michael Faraday's popular science lectures and Arthur Good's collection of experiments for children, La Science Amusante (1893). LaFollette has written on the legacy of Herbert and other early innovators of science television, "Production approaches that are now standard practice on NOVA and the Discovery Channel derive, in fact, from experimentation by television pioneers like Lynn Poole and Don Herbert and such programs as Adventure, Zoo Parade, Science in Action, and the Bell Telephone System's science specials. These early efforts were also influenced by television's love of the dramatic, refined during its first decade and continuing to shape news and public affairs programming, as well as fiction and fantasy, today."

== Subsequent career ==
In the mid-1950s, Herbert appeared on the General Electric Theater as the "General Electric Progress Reporter" and introduced spokesman Ronald Reagan and his family to the viewing audience. In some episodes, he appeared alongside Reagan and demonstrated to the audience how General Electric was helping people to "Live better electrically."

After Watch Mr. Wizard was canceled in 1965, Herbert produced eight films in a series titled Experiment: The Story of a Scientific Search. These aired on public television in 1966. In the same year, Herbert produced the Science 20 series, which were 20-minute films of experiments that were designed for classroom use. A student would record and analyze data based on the film.

In 1969, Herbert opened a Mr. Wizard Science Center in Wellesley, Massachusetts. The center no longer exists.

In 1977, he began producing a series of How About episodes about scientific topics. These were 90-second films that could be used in news programs. By 1986, he produced 536 films.

In 1982, Herbert was a guest on the first episode of Late Night with David Letterman.

== Mr. Wizard's World ==
In 1983, Herbert developed Mr. Wizard's World, a faster-paced version of his show, that aired three times per week on the cable channel Nickelodeon. The show ran until 1989 and reruns were shown until 2000.

In 1993, children's science show Beakman's World paid homage to Herbert by naming its two penguin puppet characters "Don" and "Herb" after him.

In 1994, Herbert developed another new series of 15-minute spots called Teacher to Teacher with Mr. Wizard. The spots highlighted individual elementary science teachers and their projects. The series was sponsored by the National Science Foundation and was produced at Nickelodeon Studios in Orlando, Florida, and shown on Nickelodeon.

== Death ==
Herbert died on June 12, 2007, of multiple myeloma at his home in Bell Canyon, California. In Herbert's obituary, Bill Nye wrote, "If any of you reading now have been surprised and happy to learn a few things about science watching Bill Nye the Science Guy, keep in mind, it all started with Don Herbert."

Jamie Hyneman and Adam Savage, principals of the television program MythBusters, have been described as being "reverent" of Herbert's work as Mr. Wizard. Five months after Herbert died, MythBusters aired a two-hour episode entitled "Special Super-sized Myths" "Dedicated to Mr. Wizard".

== Personal life ==
Herbert married Maraleita Dutton in 1939. They adopted three children together: Jeffrey (born 1954), Jay (born 1955), and Jill (born 1960). The couple later divorced, and Herbert married Norma Nix Kasell in 1972.

== Awards ==
- (1953) Watch Mr. Wizard won a Peabody Award.
- Three Thomas Alva Edison National Mass Media Awards
- (1991) Herbert received the annual Robert A. Millikan Medal from the American Association of Physics Teachers (AAPT) for his "notable and creative contributions to the teaching of physics;" he presented an address "Behind the Scenes of Mr. Wizard".
- (1994) Herbert won the annual James T. Grady-James H. Stack Award for Interpreting Chemistry from the American Chemical Society.
- (2007) Resolution 485 of the US House of Representatives honored Herbert shortly after his death.

== See also ==
- Julius Sumner Miller
