= 1951 Sylvania Television Awards =

Sylvania Award
- Sponsored by: Sylvania Electric Products
- Date: November 8, 1951
- Location: New York City
- Country: United States

The 1951 Sylvania Television Awards were presented on November 8, 1951, at the Hotel Pierre in New York City. The awards were established earlier in 1951 by Sylvania Electric Products. Deems Taylor was the chairman of the judges committee.

The panel of 17 judges presented 12 awards as follows:

- Best television revue -Your Show of Shows
- Best director - Max Liebman, Your Show of Shows
- Best actor in television- Sid Caesar
- Best actress in television - Imogene Coca
- Best use of film in television - Fireside Theatre
- Producer-director - Frank Wisbar, Fireside Theatre
- Writer - Arnold Belgard, Fireside Theatre
- Outstanding feat of television journalism - WPIX, New York City, for coordinating and producing pool telecasts of the Kefauver Committee hearings into organized crime
- Public service - WDSU, New Orleans, for first televising the Kefauver Committee hearings
- Best program planned as public service - Meet the Press, NBC
- Excellence as a moderator or master of ceremonies - John Charles Daly, What's My Line?
- Best program suitable for children - The Chicago Zoo Parade

The "grand award" was not awarded, as the committee found no program that measured up to its concept of "truly outstanding entertainment."
