= Leo Seltzer (filmmaker) =

American filmmaker

- Born: March 13, 1910; Montreal, Quebec, Canada
- Died: January 27, 2007 (aged 96)
- Occupation: Documentary filmmaker

Leo Seltzer

Leo Seltzer (March 13, 1910–January 27, 2007) was an American social-documentary filmmaker whose career spanned over half a century, having made more than sixty films.

Leo Seltzer was born in Montreal, Quebec, Canada. One of the founders of the Workers' Film & Photo League, Seltzer received many international awards for his work, including an Academy Award for Best Documentary Short for First Steps in 1948. In 1962 he served as cinema-biographer to the White House for President John F. Kennedy. A 1961 documentary Seltzer directed for the US Information Agency and released by United artists called Jacqueline Kennedy's Asian Journeys showed the First Lady's experiences visiting India and Pakistan.

== Filmography ==
- Technique of Fresco Painting, 1936?, showing the entire process of planning and painting a mural in fresco, namely "The Evolution of Western Civilization", which James Michael Newell executed for Evander Childs High School, New York City
- Merit System Advancing, made for the New York Civil Service Commission
- Cattle and the Corn Belt, director and photographer, produced by Louis de Rochemont Associates, shows the annual roundup, the branding, and the shipment of cattle in the fall to the farmers in the corn belt where they are fattened for market
- From Hand to Mouth, 1939, co-directed with Elaine Basil, for the WPA Federal Art Project, an educational film on the causes and prevention of bacillary dysentery
- Sculpture for Today, 1939?, co-directed with Elaine Basil, for the Motion Picture Unit of the Photographic Division of the New York WPA Art Project
- Public Health Service (1942), co-directed with Elaine Basil, for Eastman Kodak Company
- First Steps, 1947, as director and producer
- The Earth and Its Peoples: Cattle and the Cornbelt (USA - The Middle West), 1949, as director, produced by Louis de Rochemont Associates
- Florida— Wealth or Waste, 1949, director, produced by the Southern Educational Film Production Service, written by George Stoney
- Article 55, 1952, director, for the United Nations, depicts the problems of Bolivia that confront a UN mission
- The Search, 1955, TV series, director, for CBS on institutions of high learning
- Mad Whirl, 1955?, TV series, produced for NTA Film Network
- A Long Way from Home, 1958, sponsored by United Service Organizations, Inc.
- Jacqueline Kennedy's Asian Journeys, 1962, director, narrated by Raymond Massey
- Progress through Freedom, 1962, director, produced for US Information Agency on the visit of President and Mrs. Kennedy to Mexico, which dramatizes the Alliance for Progress and traditions common to the US and Latin America and is narrated by Jose Ferrer
- The American Commitment, 1963, produced for US Information Agency and narrated by Howard K. Smith
- In Friendship and Independence, 1964, produced for US Information Agency
- A Day in Malaysia, 1967, produced for US Information Agency
- Kokosing, 1970?, cinemetographer, produced for US Information Agency about the Kokosing Camp in Vermont
- A Report on Acupuncture, 1974, director and writer, for Macmillan Films, on the practice of acupuncture as applied primarily to diagnosis and treatment of pain and illness

== Sources ==
- Campbell, Russell. Cinema Strikes Back: Radical Filmmaking in the United States 1930–1942, Ann Arbor: UMI Research Press, 1982
- Campbell, Russell. Leo Seltzer interview: A total and realistic experience, Jump Cut, no. 14, 1977, pp. 25–27
- Alexander, William. Film on the Left: American Documentary Film From 1931 to 1942, Princeton, N.J.: Princeton University Press, 1981
- Seltzer, Leo. "Documenting the Depression of the 1930s: The Work of the Film and Photo League" in Platt, David, ed. Celluloid Power: Social Film Criticism from the "Birth of a Nation" to "Judgment at Nuremberg" Metuchen, NJ: Scarecrow Press: 1992, ISBN 978-0810824423
