= It's Your Life (radio program) =

- Genre: Radio documentary
- Running time: 29 minutes
- Country of origin: United States
- Language(s): English
- Home station: WMAQ
- Starring: Don Herbert
- Announcer: Tony Parrish
- Created by: Chicago Industrial Health Organization
- Produced by: Ben Park
- No. of series: 1
- No. of episodes: 27
- Sponsored by: Johnson & Johnson

It's Your Life was a documentary radio series created by the Chicago Industrial Health Organization. It aired only one year, 1949, with producer Ben Park leaving to produce a planned health-related television program for the Department of Public Health. The series tuned in on the daily problems of men and women in Chicago, Illinois, with shows focusing on depression, disability, juvenile delinquency, and the difficulties met by veterans, among other topics.

It was one of the first radio programs to use magnetic tape, a then new recording medium that allowed for greater portability, higher fidelity, and an easier means of editing. With the new opportunities afforded by magnetic tape, It's Your Life was able to create a program that mixed in-studio narration with recordings and interviews made in the field, allowing the opportunity for real people to speak about their problems in an unscripted, if edited, manner, a rarity at the time. It's Your Life is best known today for featuring the future Mr. Wizard, Don Herbert, as its field reporter.
