= Adrian Taylor (producer) =

American television news producer (1954–2014)

- Born: January 27, 1954; Doylestown, Pennsylvania, U.S.
- Died: March 21, 2014 (aged 60); Newark, New Jersey, U.S.
- Education: Boston College

Adrian Clemens "Clem" Taylor (January 27, 1954 – March 21, 2014) was an American television news producer, noted for his work on 60 Minutes, The Early Show and CBS News. Taylor won a Peabody Award for his 60 Minutes segment, "Joy in the Congo", which featured the Kimbanguist Symphony Orchestra of Kinshasa, the Democratic Republic of the Congo. In addition to his Peabody, Taylor also won eight Emmy Awards over the course of his broadcasting career.

== Early life and education ==
Taylor was born in Doylestown, Pennsylvania, on January 27, 1954. As a high school student, Taylor created "Morning Announcements," a televised school announcement show broadcast within his school, and became a paid sports reporter for the local newspaper, The Doylestown Intelligencer. Taylor received his bachelor's degree from Boston College, where he had served as the editor of BC's student newspaper, The Heights.

== Career ==
Taylor moved to Washington D.C. after graduation from Boston College. He worked for United States Senator Richard Schweiker of Pennsylvania for one year. He then returned to reporting, first as a producer and then a reporter for National Public Radio. Taylor also worked for ABC News for approximately ten years, where he produced segments for 20/20 and Primetime Live. He also produced pieces for CNBC, ESPN and Fox News during his career.

Clem Taylor spent nearly twenty years with CBS News. He worked as a CBS producer based in Washington D.C., Dallas, and New York City. He was assigned as a producer based in the White House during the Reagan administration during the 1980s. Taylor covered the Reykjavík Summit between Mikhail Gorbachev and Ronald Reagan in Iceland in 1986. In the late 1990s, he was named a senior producer of The Early Show during the late 1990s.

Taylor spent his last four years at CBS News as a producer for 60 Minutes. He co-produced a 60 Minutes segment, called "Joy in the Congo," on the Kimbanguist Symphony Orchestra of the Democratic Republic of the Congo. "Joy in the Congo" originally broadcast on Easter Sunday in 2012. The segment won a Peabody Award in May 2013.

Taylor's last segment for 60 Minutes focused on a group of men who staged the 1980 Winter Olympics.

== Personal life and death ==
In May 2013, Taylor was diagnosed with pancreatic cancer. He died at Beth Israel Medical Center in Newark, New Jersey, on March 21, 2014, at the age of 60. He was a resident of Montclair, New Jersey.
