= First Steps (1947 film) =

1947 film

- Screenshot of title frame
- Directed by: Leo Seltzer
- Written by: Al Wasserman
- Produced by: Karl Hinkle
- Narrated by: Winston O'Keefe
- Cinematography: Albert Mozell
- Production company: Frederic House Inc.
- Distributed by: National Film Board of Canada
- Release date: 1947
- Running time: 10 minutes
- Countries: International territory (United Nations); Canada (distribution)
- Language: English

First Steps is a 1947 short documentary film about the treatment of children with disabilities. Produced for the United Nations Department of Economic and Social Affairs of the United Nations by Frederic House Inc., the film was distributed by the National Film Board of Canada. (Note: The film begins with the title frame stating: "The United Nations Film Board presents".) First Steps, directed by Leo Seltzer and written by Al Wasserman, won the Documentary Short Subject Oscar at the 20th Academy Awards in 1948 for the United Nations Division of Films and Visual Education.

== Synopsis ==
In 1947, disease, accidents, crime, war, and other anti-social forces ravage young children crippled by paralysis. Occupational therapy for children takes the form of both play and work. Specialists set up a training program designed to give the children practice in the handling of toys, hobby materials, tools and utensils. The program proves to be transforming as it helps them cope with their disabilities.

With care and attention from adults, the children ultimately demonstrate how they can become normal citizens, useful to themselves and to society. One of the children from the program is able to show his parents that he has learned to walk. First, he is can simply move his legs, then after a regimen of walking exercises, he stands and finally takes his first unaided steps, able to eventually walk alone down a crowded city street.

== Production ==
First Steps was filmed in a summer camp in New York State by Frederic House Inc. under the supervision of the United Nations Department of Public Information. The children were under the medical supervision of Dr. H. Purushottam. The occupational therapists introduced different techniques of physiotherapy, taking into account their minds and emotions in addition to their bodies.

Adult workers offered not only massage and therapy, but also love and understanding, sometimes using music as a catalyst. The techniques highlight the need to take a holistic approach on children with disabilities.

== Reception ==
First Steps was distributed by the National Film Board of Canada. Although the information is considered "dated", the film is still shown on social media with United Nations messages preceding the film.

== Awards ==
The United Nations Division of Films and Visual Education won the Documentary Short Subject Oscar for First Steps at the 20th Academy Awards in 1948. The Academy Award for First Steps still resides at UN Headquarters in New York.

== Preservation ==
The Academy Film Archive preserved First Steps in 2005.
