= 1955 Sylvania Television Awards =

TV award

Sylvania Award
- Sponsored by: Sylvania Electric Products
- Date: December 2, 1955
- Location: New York City
- Country: United States

The 1955 Sylvania Television Awards were presented on December 2, 1955, in New York City. The Sylvania Awards were established by Sylvania Electric Products.

The committee presented the following awards:

- Best show of the year - Peter Pan (NBC)
- Best new TV series - The $64,000 Question (CBS)
- Best performance by an actor - Sidney Poitier in A Man Is Ten Feet Tall (NBC)
- Most original teleplay - A Man Is Ten Feet Tall by Robert Alan Aurthur (NBC)
- Best performance by an actress - Julie Harris in Wind From The South (CBS)
- Best performance in classical role - Jose Ferrer in Cyrano De Bergerac (NBC)
- Best performance, supporting actress - Mildred Dunnock, A Child Is Born (ABC)
- Best dramatic show - Patterns by Rod Serling
- Best comedy show - You'll Never Get Rich, Phil Silvers (CBS)
- Variety entertainment - The Ed Sullivan Show (CBS)
- Best musical series - The Voice of Firestone (ABC)
- Best dramatic series - Kraft Television Theatre (NBC)
- Best documentary - The Vice Presidency, Edward R. Murrow (CBS)
- Network public service - The Search (CBS)
- Local public service - Our Religious Roots (KPIX San Francisco) and Dateline Washington (WDSU New Orleans)
- Network news and special events - Presidential news conference, award to James Hagerty, White House News Secretary
- Local news and special events - WBX in Boston
- Network education series - Omnibus (CBS)
- Best local education series - Your future unlimited (WMCT)
- Best network children's show - The Mickey Mouse Club, Disney
- Best local children's show - The Children's Corner, Fred Rogers, producer (WQED Pittsburgh)
- Special award for "The Greatest Contributions to creative Television Techniques" - Sylvester Weaver, president of NBC
- Best sports coverage - Gillette Safety Razor Company
