= The American Forum of the Air =

American public affairs panel discussion program

Theodore Granik and panelists in a July 1952 broadcast

The American Forum of the Air, hosted by Theodore "Ted" Granik (1907–1970), is a public affairs panel discussion program, the first series of its kind on radio. It aired on the Mutual Broadcasting System and NBC from 1934 to 1956. Notable guests, such as Franklin D. Roosevelt (before he was president), journalist Dorothy Thompson, New York mayor Fiorello H. La Guardia, U.S. Senators Harry Truman and Robert A. Taft, discussed a wide range of topics, from the New Deal to fascism. The series won a Peabody Award in 1940.

The program's origins can be traced back to 1928 when Brooklyn-born Granik was a law student employed by Gimbels department store, which then had its own radio station, WGBS. While writing copy for the station and doing sports reporting, Granik started his own program, Law for the Layman. When Gimbel's station was sold to William Randolph Hearst in 1932, Granik continued doing his panel discussions on New York's WOR. The program attracted national attention with a prohibition debate in which the Woman's Christian Temperance Union's Ella A. Boole made the startling claim that drunken Congressmen were wandering through "underground passages" to go from their offices to Washington speakeasies.

The program became The Mutual Forum Hour when the Mutual network was launched in 1934. After Granik opened his law office in Washington, D.C., he moved the program there in 1937 with a title change to The American Forum of the Air. Within the rigid format, opening remarks by the debating opponents led to the panel discussion, followed by Q&A with the audience and closing summaries.

Transcripts were published in the Congressional Record, and the debates often sparked activity in Congress. The series moved to television in 1949, continuing on NBC Radio until March 11, 1956.
