= Tom Palazzolo =

American artist and photographer (born 1937)

Tom Palazzolo (born 1937) is an American experimental filmmaker, photographer, and painter. From St. Louis, Missouri, Palazzolo moved to Chicago, Illinois in 1960 to attend the School of the Art Institute of Chicago. Palazzolo is most known for his Chicago-centric documentary films. He is recognized for his ability to reveal the realities of the working class and urban life. Utilizing the Cinéma vérité style in films such as Jerry's (1976), his perspective often include panoramic views of a place or event. Palazzolo's editing style is said to add a sense of humor while still portraying his subjects honestly. He was an important part of the underground film scene in Chicago during the 1960-70s that set itself apart from the lights of Hollywood and New York City.

== Early life ==
Tom Palazzolo was born in a working-class neighborhood in north Saint Louis, Missouri. His father was the son of Italian immigrants and his mother was third-generation Irish. Palazzolo is the oldest of his three siblings, Lynn, Bob and Janis. He attended an all-boys Catholic elementary school where he was recognized for his drawing abilities of his favourite characters. Evading his parents wish for him to attend an all-boys Catholic high school as well, Palazzolo managed to slip into the public Beaumont High School. His interest in drawing led to his submission in a Draw Me! contest and his enrollment in a mail-in Art Instruction Schools.

== Education ==
After graduating high school in 1957, Palazzolo worked at McDonnell Douglas plant for a year. During that time, he saved up money to attend art school. Off the recommendation of an old teacher, he enrolled in the Ringling College of Art and Design in Sarasota, Florida. While at Ringling, he met Bernie Beckman, and the two studied commercial art together. Beckmann soon left for The School of the Art Institute of Chicago and Palazzolo wanted to follow. He was rejected the first time but came back in person the next year and was accepted.

After moving in with Beckmann, he began to explore the city. He was intrigued by the grit of Chicago, its buildings, neighborhoods, businesses, attractions, and people. These interests would become a part of his painting practice to the disdain of his professors. After a slew of negative painting critiques, he signed up for a photography class taught by Kenneth Josephson in 1963. Josephson was the first professor to positively critique Palazzolo. Josephson also gave him his first filmmaking camera, the Keystone 16mm. Palazzolo's six years as a student wrapped up at his final critique where he presented his photography instead of paintings. So, his painting professors decided to give him a Bachelor and Master of Fine Arts in Photography.

Palazzolo is known for exhibiting with the group known as the Hairy Who or Chicago Imagists, a group of students from the School of the Art Institute of Chicago for transformed the city's art scene in the 60s with their bold, eclectic work and displays after graduation.

== Professional life ==
Underground film groups and independent filmmakers were coming onto the scene most notably in New York City, Los Angeles, and Chicago. Palazzolo was particularly inspired by artists D.A. Pennabaker and Ricky Leacock for shooting without a tripod as well as experimenting with the ideas of narrative. These were unconventional techniques of cinema verité moving away from the static and scripted west coast films. Palazzolo was among the group of artists in Chicago who helped pioneer the art of independent filmmaking.

In the mid 1960s, Palazzolo and a group of friends formed the Floating Cinematheque, a secret film society that met in apartments around Chicago. Many of the films by the Floating Cinematheque faced the chagrin of the Chicago Police Censor Board, which determined whether films should be censored or not. Once the Motion Picture Association of America adopted a rating system of films in 1968, local censorship watchdogs became a thing of the past and dispersed the attention for underground film groups like Floating Cinematheque.

During his time with the Floating Cinematheque, Palazzolo also regularly attended Monday night screenings at the Second City that were curated by exhibitors under the name Aardvark. Screenings at film festivals and Aardvark helped the promotion of Palazzolo's films. Roger Ebert was in attendance to many of the showings. He even reviewed some of Palazzolo's films such as Pigeon Lady about a neighborhood woman who fed the birds and Campaign, a film about the Democratic Convention of 1968. During the 1960s, Ebert was a well known supporter of Palazzolo's independent style and the two interviewed together with author and broadcaster Studs Terkel's WTTW talk show. In 1968, after gaining notable media attention for his documentary films, Palazzolo was invited by the United States Information Agency to tour the Middle East, Ceylon, India, and Turkey for three months to give talks and screen his films publicly. They chose Palazzolo, a so-called non-flamboyant Midwesterner but still from the notable city of Chicago to help inspire and promote independent filmmaking in those countries. Palazzolo also married long-term girlfriend Marcia Daehn in the same year in order for her to join him on the trip.

Palazzolo has taught film classes at Richard J. Daley College of the Chicago City Colleges from 1966-2002 and The School of the Art Institute of Chicago from 1976-1990.

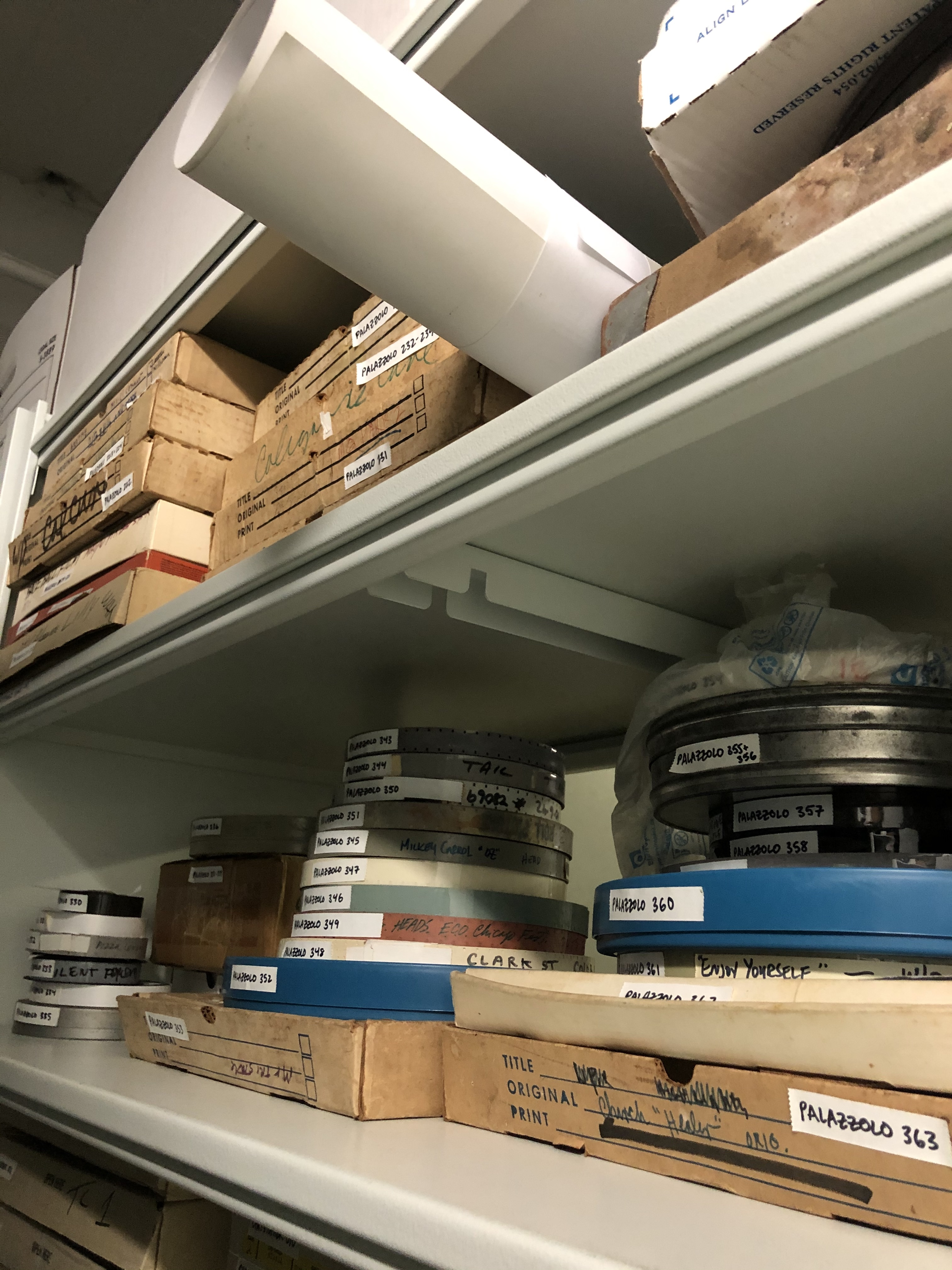
Collection of Tom Palazzolo's films at the Chicago Film Archives.

Palazzolo may be most well known for his film work, but he has continued his painting practice in shows such as "Tom Marches On! Four Decades of Paintings, Prints, and Photographs by Tom Palazzolo," in October 1999. "I always tried to knock out at least a few paintings a year, just to, um, keep my foot in, " said Palazzolo Palazzolo also continues his photography practice.

In July 2013, Palazzolo had a show called "The Tom Palazzolo Retrospective: Film, Photographs, Paintings, Watercolors & Sculpture" at the Co-Prosperity Sphere in Chicago's Bridgeport neighborhood.

Palazzolo's book "Clark Street" was published in November 2019 with many of his original photos of Chicago from the 1960s and 1970s.

The Chicago Film Archives houses a large collection of Palazzolo's original films and subsequent copies.

== Major works and collaborators ==
Early notable films of Palazzolo's include Love It / Leave It (1973), a document of the Naked City Beauty Pageant in Roselawn, Indiana and a variety of midwestern parades. This film includes a political statement by juxtaposing scenes of nude pageant contestants with shots of police officers and quick cuts of clowns, illustrating Palazzolo's interest in political and social commentary. Often a participant or a close observer to the action, Palazzolo works to reveal absurdities he finds in midwestern norms and values.

Palazzolo approaches the subject of parades again in Your Astronauts (1970), in which he uses noise from a cafeteria as a soundtrack for the chaos of the Apollo 11 parade. Palazzolo found particular interest in the large number of suburban residents who had made their way into the city for occasions like these.

In 1972, Palazzolo met sixteen-year-old Jeff Kreines, a high school dropout from New Trier High School. He viewed one of Kreines' documentary films while judging a contest for student filmmakers at the Chicago Public Library. He admired Kreine's Cinéma vérité style, and the two made eight films together, with the most notable being Pets on Parade and Ricky and Rocky. Ricky and Rocky follows Ricky, who is Italian, and Roxanne, who is Polish, through their surprise wedding shower thrown by Ricky's family. The camerawork in Ricky and Rocky emphasizes the family and their style, which is consequently more eventful than the wedding shower itself. The film won awards at the Ann Arbor Film Festival and the Bellevue Film Festival.

Kreines later introduced Palazzolo to Mark Rance, a classmate of his from New Trier. Palazzolo and Rance soon became collaborators as well. Their first collaboration was in 1975 about a naturist community in northern Indiana, titled Sneakin 'n Peakin'. Rance and Palazzolo's most well-known documentaries were Marquette Park and Marquette Park II, which documented still-existing bands of Nazis protesting black families moving into Marquette Park in the mid-1970s. These films were shown at the Museum of Contemporary Art Chicago and later at the Cannes Film Festival. Palazzolo and Rance's collaborations came to and end when Rance moved to Los Angeles.

During this time Palazzo worked on independent projects including Jerry's, an inside look at the hectic nature of Jerry's Deli in Streeterville, Gay for a Day, which chronicled a pride parade, and I Was a Contestant at Mother's Wet T-shirt Contest, filmed at Mother's Bar and Club.

Other collaborators included Allen Ross, who helped found Chicago Filmmakers. In 1980, Ross and Palazzolo created Nonna, a portrait of Palazzolo's Italian grandmother. By this time, the independent film industry was changing rapidly due to a rise in costs and the introduction of video. While many filmmakers switched to video, Palazzolo went on to create two more film works - this time narratives, titled Caligari's Cure (1982) and Added Lessons (1991).

== Personal life ==
Palazzolo married his wife Marcia Daehn in 1968. They had three children: Sarah, Amy, and Todd. Amy was featured in one of Palazzolo's short films in 2001 known as Rita on the Ropes which Jack Helbig helped write.
