= The Johns Hopkins Science Review =

- Opening credit from the October 8, 1951, episode
- Created by: Lynn Poole
- Starring: Lynn Poole; Robert Cochrane
- Country of origin: United States
- No. of episodes: 303

Production
- Running time: 30 minutes

Original release
- Network: CBS (1948–1950); DuMont (1950–1955)
- Release: March 9, 1948 – March 6, 1955

The Johns Hopkins Science Review is an American television series about science that was produced at Johns Hopkins University in Baltimore, Maryland from 1948 to 1955. Starting in 1950, the series aired on the DuMont Television Network until the network's demise in 1955. The series' creator was Lynn Poole, who wrote or co-wrote most of its episodes and acted as the on-camera host.

The original series was followed by three related series produced by Poole at Johns Hopkins University: Tomorrow (1955), Tomorrow's Careers (1955–1956), and Johns Hopkins File 7 (1956–1960). Johns Hopkins University ended its production of television series in 1960.

== Broadcast history ==
The original series aired from March 9, 1948, to March 6, 1955. Initially, the show was broadcast only in the Baltimore area. Starting with the December 17, 1948, episode, shows were broadcast by CBS from stations along the East Coast.

As was typical in the early days of television broadcasting, each show was broadcast live from a studio at Johns Hopkins University. Each week's show involved one or more guests, often from the Johns Hopkins faculty and staff. Poole acted as the host and interviewer. The guest might show how a scientific apparatus such an electron microscope or an oscilloscope worked, or would briefly explain scientific ideas to the viewers. In the December 5, 1950, episode, the live broadcast of a fluoroscope screen was used by doctors in New York and Chicago to diagnose the injuries to a machinist in the hospital in Baltimore. In the April 21, 1952, episode, a scientist drank a solution containing the radioactive isotope of iodine, and then followed its progress in his own body with a Geiger counter. The guests were sometimes national figures like Wernher von Braun (October 20, 1952), George Gamov, and Harold Urey. The show famously showed a live birth and gave instructions to women viewers about breast self-examination.

Each half-hour episode was broadcast from WAAM in Baltimore. The series moved to the DuMont Television Network in November 1949 through station WMAR. The program aired Tuesdays at 8:30 pm EST during the 1950-51 season, Mondays at 8:30pm EST during the 1951-52 season, and Wednesdays at 8pm EST during the 1952-53 season. According to the 1953-54 United States network television schedule, the show remained in the Wednesday at 8pm EST slot for the 1953-54 season.

The series would win the network Peabody Awards in 1950 (honorable mention) and 1952.

A spin-off program, Johns Hopkins File 7, aired on a syndicated basis from 1956 to 1960. Like the Review, File 7 was broadcast by WAAM and featured host Lynn Poole.

== Archives ==
Approximately 303 episodes of the original series were made. There are records of 238 episodes, and kinescope films from 186 episodes, stored in Special Collections of the Milton Eisenhower Library at Johns Hopkins University. This means it has the most surviving episodes of any DuMont Network program. The earliest surviving kinescope is from November 21, 1950. At least three episodes survive at the UCLA Film and Television Archive.

In addition, Johns Hopkins University has records and films of the three successor series.

== Retrospective reception ==
In 2002, Patrick Lucanio and Gary Coville wrote that, "In retrospect, Lynn Poole created one of those unique series that allowed television to fulfill its idealized mission as both an educational and an entertainment medium." Johns Hopkins Magazine declared in 2019 that the show was "ahead of its time" for its frank approach to educating its viewers on matter of science, especially biology.

== See also ==
- List of programs broadcast by the DuMont Television Network
- List of surviving DuMont Television Network broadcasts
- 1950-51 United States network television schedule
- 1951-52 United States network television schedule
- 1952-53 United States network television schedule
- 1953-54 United States network television schedule
