= Arthur Zegart =

American documentary film producer

- Born: March 16, 1916; Chicago, Illinois, U.S.
- Died: February 2, 1989 (aged 72)
- Education: University of Chicago
- Occupation: Documentary film producer
- Spouse: Patricia Zegart
- Children: 1 son, 1 daughter
- Parent(s): Joseph Zegart; Mary Bernstein

Arthur Zegart (March 16, 1916 - February 2, 1989) was an American documentary film producer. He produced 125 documentary films for television.

== Early life ==
Zegart was born on March 16, 1916, in Chicago. Zegart's father, Joseph, emigrated from Poland in 1913 after being drafted into the Tsar's cavalry, much of Poland then being under Russian rule. A Jew from the little village of Sokolow who had never been on a horse and had suffered through violent anti-Jewish pogroms, he evaded authorities and escaped into Austria-Hungary, ultimately finding his way to Chicago via Canada. Joseph Zegart settled in an Irish neighborhood on the south side of Chicago where anti-Semitism was common, and the experience of anti-Jewish feeling - and physical violence - made a life-long impression on young Arthur Zegart. During the Great Depression, Arthur and his three younger siblings were placed in a Jewish orphanage after his mother became ill and Joseph could no longer support the family. Zegart became fascinated with photography as a young man, but was originally a pre-medical student at the University of Chicago, from which he graduated. In the mid-1930s, he traveled to the Middle East, North Africa, southwestern France and Spain, taking pictures of refugees from the Spanish Civil War and of Arab and Palestinian culture.

== Career ==
Zegart began his career at United Press International, and he later worked for the United Nations in post-war Europe, filming the plight of World War II refugees for the United Nations Relief and Rehabilitation Agency, and later the UN's International Refugee Organization, followed by a stint with the National Science Foundation. He produced 125 documentary films for network television, including ABC, NBC, CBS and PBS. His documentaries covered many subjects including mental institutions, prisons, ("San Quentin," for CBS's "The Search" series), the flight of Jewish refugees to Israel after World War II ("Bricha: Flight to Security" for the ABC-TV News "Directions" series), legalized gambling ("The Business of Gambling," for the NBC White Paper series), vanishing passenger railroads ("Railroads: End of the Line," another NBC White Paper in 1961), the struggle for democracy in Venezuela ("Last Chance for Democracy," for National Educational Television, now PBS), the threat of neo-Nazism in Germany ("Germany and It's Shadow,"for NET/PBS, 1967), the Vietnam War ("Southeast Asia: The Other War," for NET/PBS). and the United Nations ("Who Speaks for Man?"for NET/PBS, 1969), as well as state legislatures ("Man in the Middle: The State Legislator" an NBC White Paper), racial issues in the suburbs, the flamboyant black 1960s Congressman Adam Clayton Powell, the world of a San Francisco homicide detective ("San Francisco Detective," an NBC White Paper), poor people and the welfare system ("The Battle of Newburgh," an NBC White Paper, 1962), and many others. With director Robert M. Young, he co-wrote the story for the first IMAX documentary, "To Fly," made for the 1976 bicentennial opening of the National Air and Space Museum in Washington, D.C.

On most of his documentaries, Zegart handled every part of the film-making enterprise – writing, directing and producing. NBC White Paper, CBS Search and the PBS documentaries were hour-long programs, network emblems of public spiritedness that were rolled out to reviews in the New York Times.

Zegart is considered a major pioneer and innovator in documentary film, with a career that lasted from 1945 until his death in 1989. He had many firsts to his credit. He was the first to bring a news film camera into a prison yard and shoot candid interviews with convicts, which he did in "San Quentin," the first to shoot documentary footage in the United Nations General Assembly ("Who Speaks for Man?"), and the first to make a film about the early years of the American intervention in Vietnam from the Vietnamese point of view.

Zegart's professional recognition included such awards as the Albert Lasker Medical Journalism Award in 1956, the Gabriel Award in 1969, and the Freedom Foundation at Valley Forge award in 1980. Zegart was nominated for the Emmy Awards three times, including for NBC White Paper in 1962.

== Personal life and death ==
With his wife Patricia, Zegart had a son, Dan, and a daughter, Caroline. They resided in South Nyack, New York.

Zegart, who for years had had a rare blood disorder with a poor prognosis, committed suicide by jumping off the Tappan Zee Bridge on February 2, 1989, at age 72.
