= 1954 Sylvania Television Awards =

Sylvania Award
- Sponsored by: Sylvania Electric Products
- Date: November 30, 1954
- Location: New York City
- Country: United States

The 1954 Sylvania Television Awards were presented on November 30, 1954, in New York City. The Sylvania Awards were established by Sylvania Electric Products. The awards were selected by a committee of judges that included Ethel Barrymore, Deems Taylor, and James A. Farley.

The committee presented the following awards:

- Grand award - James E. Moser, creator and writer of Medic
- Most outstanding program - Medic, awards to executive producer Worthington Miner and Dow Chemical Co. (NBC)
- Best dramatic series - The Philco Goodyear Television Playhouse, Fred Coe and Gordon Duff, producers (NBC)
- Finest original teleplay - Man or Mountain Top, awards to Robert Alan Aurthur, author, and Arthur Penn, director (NBC)
- Dramatic actor - Steven Hill
- Dramatic actress - Eva Marie Saint
- Character actor - E. G. Marshall
- Character actress - Eileen Heckart
- Outstanding comedy team - Jackie Gleason, Audrey Meadows, and Art Carney, for their work in the "Honeymooners" sketches on The Jackie Gleason Show (CBS)
- Wholesome family entertainment - Father Knows Best, Robert Young and Jane Wyatt, Screen Gems (CBS)
- Most outstanding series for children of all ages - Disneyland, Walt Disney (ABC)
- Finest local children's show - Little Schoolhouse, Mrs. Eleanor Hempel (KTTV, Los Angeles)
- Best educational series - The Search, Irving Gitlin, producer (CBS)
- Comedian of the year - George Gobel (NBC)
- Documentary program of the year - Three Two One . . . Zero, Henry Salomon Jr., producer and co-writer (NBC)
- Excellent showmanship in variety entertainment - Ed Sullivan and Marlo Lewis, Talk of the Town (CBS)
- Local public service - Our Beautiful Potomac, Stuart Finley, producer and narrator (WRC-TV, Washington, DC)
- Superior camera direction - Franklin Schaffner, director, for Twelve Angry Men (CBS)
- Public information service - John Charles Daly, producer, for Open Hearing (ABC)
- Local television news coverage - Telepix News, John Tillman, newscaster, WPIX, New York City
