= Adventure (TV series) =

American documentary TV series

- Narrated by: Charles Collingwood
- Theme music composer: Bernard Greenwald (as Bernard Green)
- Country of origin: United States
- Original language: English
- No. of seasons: 3

Original release
- Network: CBS
- Release: May 1953 – July 1956

Adventure is a documentary television series that aired on CBS beginning in 1953. The series was produced in collaboration with the American Museum of Natural History and hosted by Charles Collingwood. The program consisted of interviews with scientists and academicians and films of anthropological expeditions.

Individuals appearing in interviews included historian Bernard DeVoto, biologist Alexander Fleming, and adventurer Sasha Siemel.

Marcel LaFollette has written, "Production approaches that are now standard practice on NOVA and the Discovery Channel derive, in fact, from experimentation by television pioneers like Lynn Poole and Don Herbert and such programs as Adventure, Zoo Parade, Science in Action, and the Bell Telephone System's science specials. These early efforts were also influenced by television's love of the dramatic, refined during its first decade and continuing to shape news and public affairs programming, as well as fiction and fantasy, today." LaFollette included the program in her 2008 overview of early broadcasting devoted to science popularization.

== Broadcast history ==
The show began its run on May 10, 1953 and was broadcast on late Sunday afternoon. It switched to early Sunday evening (6:00 pm to 7:00 pm) on June 28, 1953. In October 1953, it returned to Sunday afternoon and remained there through July 1956.

== Critical response ==
A review in the trade publication Billboard said that Adventure "has done an exemplary job of applying TV showmanship to informational material", although the reviewer felt that a segment featuring frolicking teddy bears in a recent episode diminished the show's overall quality. Other segments received more favorable comments. A 1956 review in Billboard found an episode about South American headhunting tribes' habits and activities to be "fascinating".
