= Dorothy Warenskjold =

American opera singer

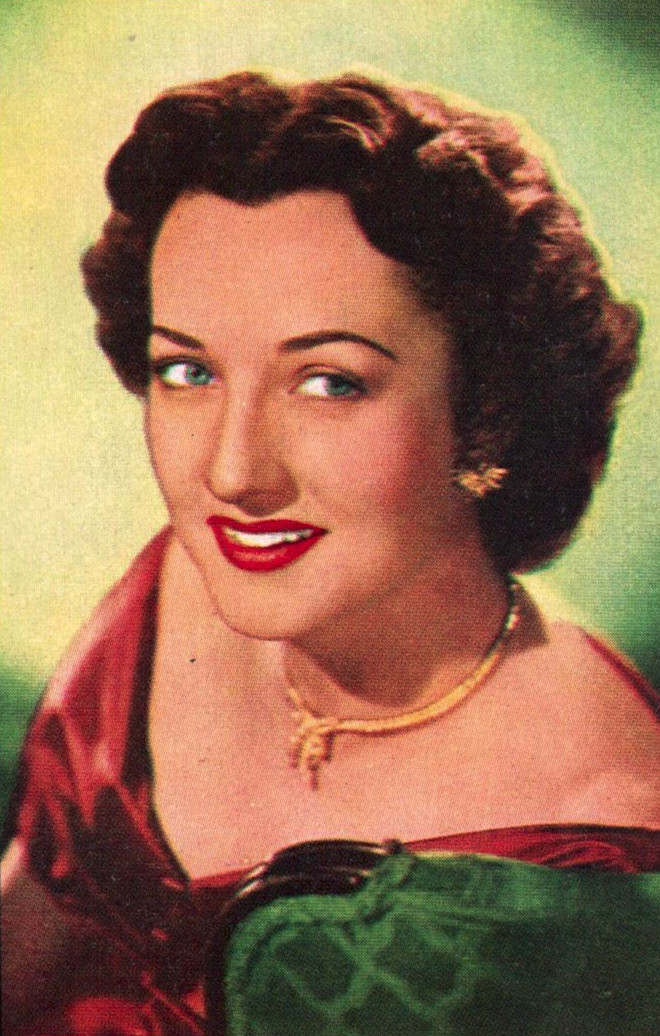
- Warenskjold in 1953

Background information
- Born: Dorothy Lorayne Warenskjold; May 11, 1921; San Leandro, California, U.S.
- Died: December 27, 2010 (aged 89) Lenexa, Kansas, U.S.
- Occupation: Singer
- Years active: 1943–1972

Dorothy Lorayne Warenskjold (May 11, 1921 – December 27, 2010) was an American lyric soprano who had an active career in opera, concerts, radio, television, and recitals from the mid-1940s through the early 1970s. She made several recordings for Capitol Records; other recordings were later released from restored material. She was fully California born, trained, and resident, in an era when the ranks of classical singers were dominated by Europe or New York. In addition to critical acclaim for her impeccable operatic performances, she achieved several decades of wide affection from cultured listeners across non-metropolitan North America, for her combination of radio/television and touring recitals. However, her early success was followed by later forgottenness. Long-time Chicago Symphony President Henry Fogel wrote, "Warenskjold was a fine lyric soprano who deserved a bigger career than she had."

== Early years ==
Born in San Leandro, California, Dorothy Warenskjold (pronounced "Warrenshold") was the only child of Mr. and Mrs. William Earl Warenskjold. Her paternal grandfather, Axel Warenskjold, had immigrated from Norway--travelling alone at age 15 and leaving behind 19 siblings. He became an inventor, industrialist, and arts patron, knighted by Norwegian King Haakon VII.

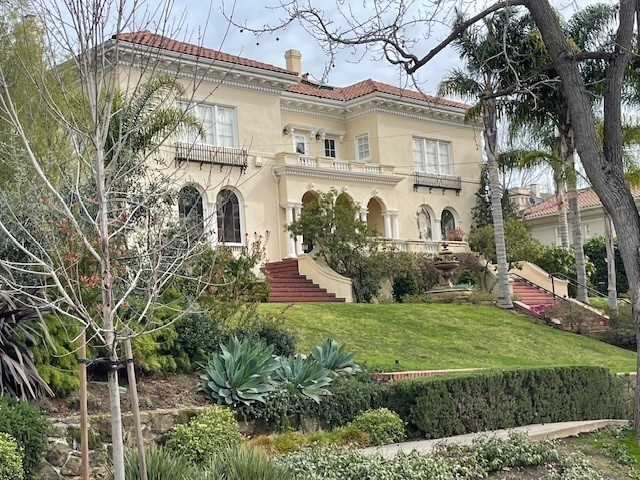
Axel Warenskjold Mansion, 50 Bellevue Ave., Piedmont CA

Her mother, Mildred Stombs, was a professional pianist, voice teacher, and operatic coach.

Warenskjold grew up in nearby Oakland, Piedmont, and Diablo village. She attended the private Miss Wallace's School for Girls, and was active in school music and theater, as well as winning the mathematics prize upon graduation. She was popular for her kindness, and strongly athletic, enjoying swimming, golf, and riding. Her tennis game in her youth approached professional levels; she had trained with the same coach as tennis champion Don Budge. She would maintain a trim and fit condition throughout her singing career.

Planning to be an attorney, she pursued pre-legal training at Mills College in Oakland and at UC Berkeley, until her junior year, when Mabel Riegelman began giving her vocal lessons. She graduated from Mills College in 1943 with a BA in languages and a minor in music.

Her degree background would later enable her to sing in at least 8 languages.

== Career ==
One of Warenskjold's first significant performances was on September 18, 1943, at the Edvard Grieg Centennial Concert in San Francisco, singing in Norwegian. San Francisco Chronicle music critic Alfred Frankenstein attended and noted her for the future. She also sang repeatedly in the city for religious holidays and services at St. Luke's Church and Temple Emanuel (singing in Latin and phonetically-learned Hebrew, respectively). Her first experience with an orchestra was on December 27, 1945, at the annual Naval Station Treasure Island Christmas concert--with the San Francisco Symphony under Pierre Monteux. In 1947, the soprano was hired for The Standard School Broadcast, an association that would span 22 years; this was soon followed by performances on The Standard Hour evening broadcast.

=== San Francisco operatic career ===
As an opera singer, Warenskjold worked mainly with the San Francisco Opera (SFO). Founder Gaetano Merola had spotted her while conducting a broadcast of The Standard Hour from the California State Fair, in Sacramento. The soprano made her debut on October 7, 1948 as Nannetta in Giuseppe Verdi's Falstaff. Her debut had ended up being accelerated, on short notice, related to a potential casting emergency at the opera—and in the musically more difficult (though less exposed) Nannetta, compared with the originally announced Micaela in Carmen. William Steinberg from the New York Philharmonic was conducting; she had not previously either studied Nannetta or stood on a professional opera stage. Critical response was strongly positive.

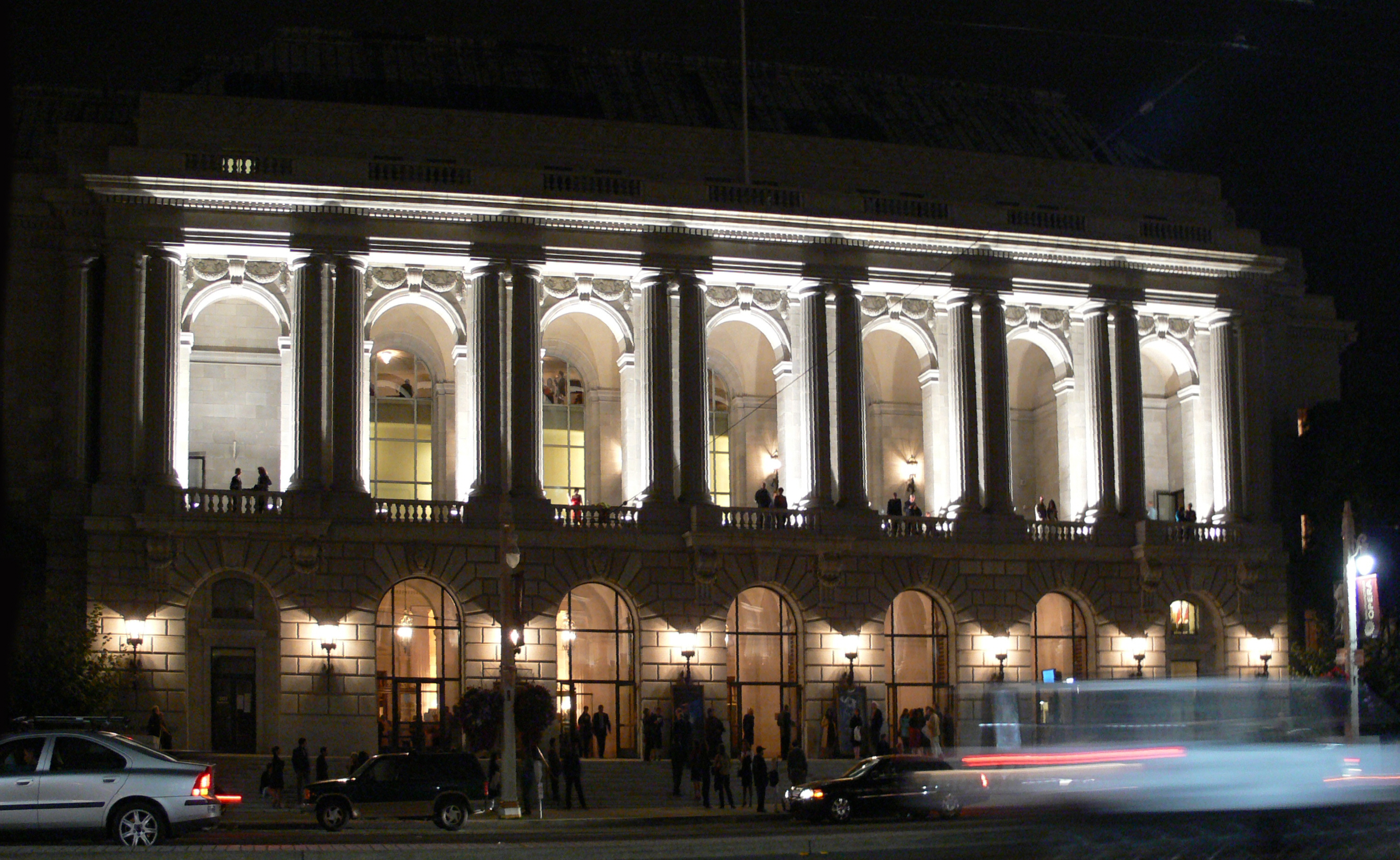
San Francisco War Memorial Opera House at night

She performed Micaela on October 17 as originally scheduled; San Francisco Chronicle reviewer Alfred Frankenstein wrote, "Seldom has an audience given Micaela so marked an ovation". She sang with the SFO for the next eight consecutive seasons (1948-1955), performing such roles as Antonia in The Tales of Hoffmann, Cherubino in The Marriage of Figaro, Lauretta in Gianni Schicchi, Marzelline in Fidelio, Micaëla in Carmen, Mimì in La Bohème, Pamina in The Magic Flute, Sophie in Werther, Liù in Turandot, and Sophie in Der Rosenkavalier.

A notable event occurred in Turandot, on October 11, 1953, when Warenskjold disciplined herself to perform the slave girl Liù 14 hours after her father's midnight death from a sudden heart attack. Metropolitan and SF Opera star Licia Albanese, a friend of Warenskjold's, was present in the house and potentially able to take over if she collapsed, but was not needed. The synergy of the tragic Liù role—struggling under torture to save her men—with the soprano's emotional situation (by then known throughout the War Memorial Opera House) produced a result that left a stunned audience and drew mention by over 150 newspapers, including on the East Coast. A house transcription recording was made, which was also distributed by Armed Forces Radio Network; Liù's grim final aria Tu, che di gel sei cinta from this performance appears on the Cambria CD "A Treasury of Operatic Heroines" (see Discography below).

The soprano's next-to-final appearance at the SFO was in October 1955 as Sophie in Richard Strauss's Der Rosenkavalier, with Elisabeth Schwarzkopf (in Schwarzkopf's North American operatic debut) as the Marschallin and Frances Bible as Octavian. Erich Leinsdorf conducted. Critic and opera historian Arthur Bloomfield wrote, "...this was a Rosenkavalier which set a standard for seasons to come." Images from it are sold to the present day at the SFO bookstore.

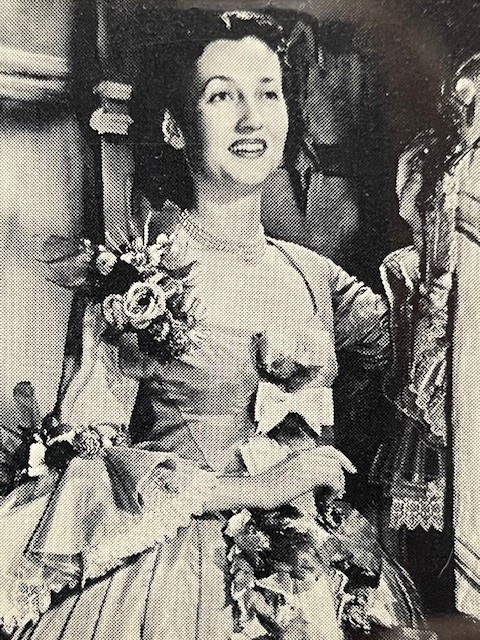
Dorothy Warenskjold as Sophie in Der Rosenkavalier

San Francisco Chronicle reviewer Alfred Frankenstein had previously written, "Miss Warenskjold is one of the most heart-breaking interpreters of Sophie's music that it has been my privilege to hear."

Warenskjold later stated that she left the SF Opera due to new SFO General Director Kurt Herbert Adler proving to be much harder to work with than founder Gaetano Merola. Others at the SFO experienced this and made their own decisions. The preponderance of stayers would reap the benefits of Adler's enormous, successful, expansion of programs in the ensuing decades; she would not. She left on polite terms, and was later to collaborate repeatedly with him in adjudicating major opera auditions, as well as being invited by him to sing at the 50th anniversary celebration of the SFO and announced as one of the honored guests at Adler's own 25th/50th Jubilee gala in 1978. The soprano's sudden disappearance from the SFO caused a degree of puzzlement and sense of loss among opera cognoscenti. Longtime operatic scholar and reviewer James Forrest, referencing Rosenkavalier, later wrote of "... the beloved California soprano Dorothy Warenskjold, my first Sophie (1955) whose SFO career inexplicably ended that year only a performance or two after I heard her in Los Angeles. She sang four Micaëlas in Chicago in 1959 (critics raved; I’ve never heard better). I never heard her in person again; she was not yet 40."

However, she did further sing opera in San Francisco under the auspices of the short-lived Cosmopolitan Opera Company (1954–60), at the War Memorial Opera House as with the San Francisco Opera. It was at the Cosmopolitan, on April 1, 1960, that she sang as tenor Jussi Bjorling's last leading lady, Marguerite to his Faust, in his final operatic performance before his death at age 49. San Francisco Chronicle reviewer Dean Wallace wrote: "Bjorling was in splendid voice...one of his finest seasons...but in no way did he outshine Miss Warenskjold."

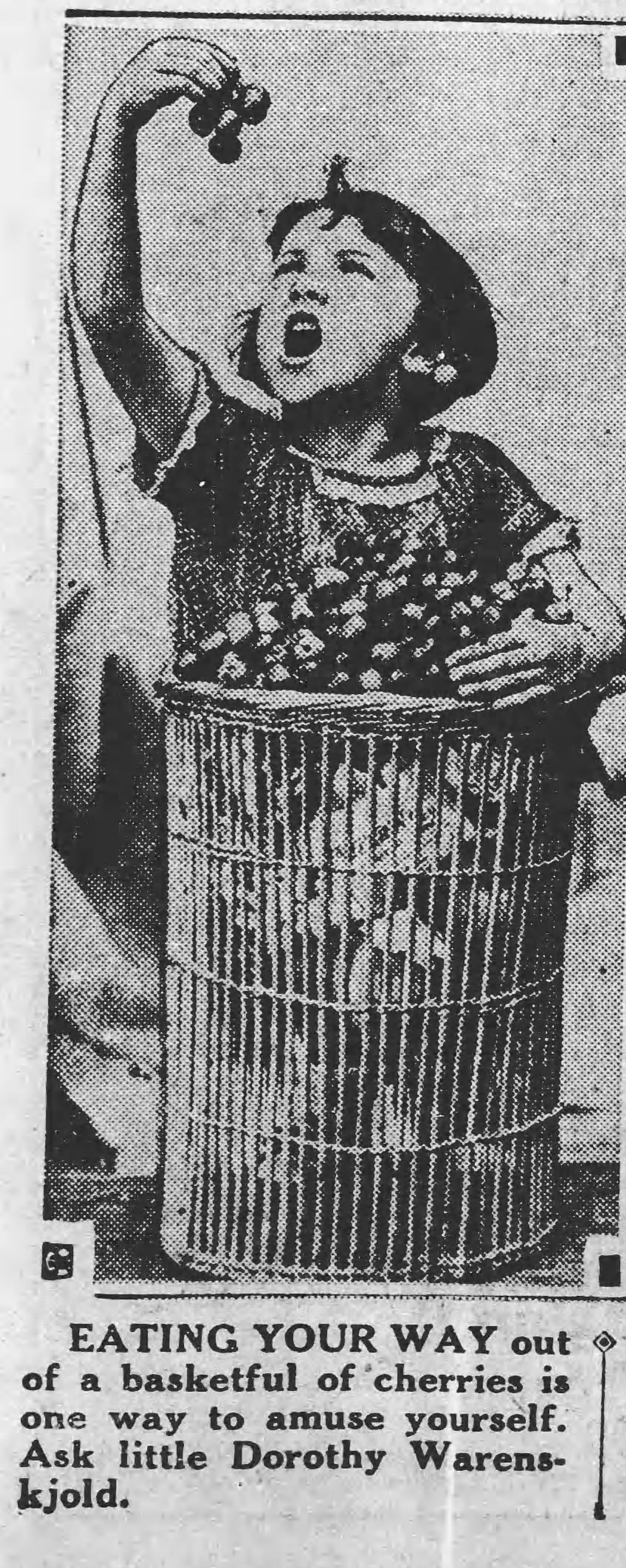
Dorothy Warenskjold, age 5, wolfing cherries at San Leandro Cherry festival. The Oakland Post-Enquirer, May 27 1926.

=== Voice and stage presentation ===
Warenskjold was a pure lyric soprano. SF Opera founder Gaetano Merola liked to compare her to Claudia Muzio. She was noted for her crystal clarity of line, purity of tone, and meticulous technique, combined with instinctive artistry. At the same time she was capable of a pleasant conversational affect in her singing when wanted. The soprano had been trained with the Vaccai exercises by her teacher, Mabel Riegelman. Her surviving recordings show remarkable consistency over a span of several decades; she was also a non-smoker. The size of her voice has generally been characterized as "medium". One reviewer had described her voice during her Nannetta debut as "a bit light at this first appearance", but that seemed to be remedied with experience. She normally would not, however, perform dramatic or dramatic-lyric roles: She was a praised Sophie but never a Marschallin (Rosenkavalier). Gaetano Merola once requested her to find out how many half steps downwards she would need to transpose the Mozart Queen of the Night (with its four high F's above high C) if she had to sing it in an emergency. From the result, it may be inferred that her top note was a high E flat above high C in a large hall, or a full E natural in studio or rehearsal. However, Warenskjold was unusually cautious in pushing her voice, and by the standards of some singers she possibly would have been physically capable of going a little higher (and bigger). She stated that, in a studio or small hall environment, she would occasionally make modest forays into spinto, dramatic-lyric or coloratura repertoire. A possible example would be her 10 performance run in 1961 as Violetta in La Traviata, at the Central City Opera in Colorado. The historic silver mining town Opera House seats an intimate 550--albeit at an altitude of 8,500 feet. However, in August 1952, she had also sung a concert 2nd act of La Traviata outdoors at the Hollywood Bowl (with its seating capacity of over 17,000). She reported that her voice had no difficulty filling the Bowl without amplification, in its acoustic golden era before the hillsides were cut back to supply extra parking.

The soprano was noted for her "delightful" stage presence, coupled with appearance and personal charm.

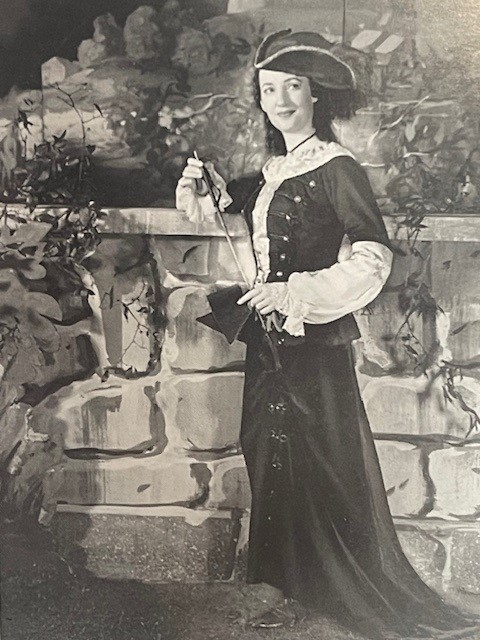
Dorothy Warenskjold in her 3rd Act riding costume, probably personally owned, from the opera Martha

Her lithe, athletic figure was a help in youthful roles; for example, she wore the Act Three riding habit in Martha easily and convincingly, being in fact an actual horsewoman. She stated that her emphasis was on traditional stagecraft, using a repertoire of practiced moves applied with an intelligent awareness of the character; she taught a popular class on Stage Presentation in her later years at UCLA (see "Post Retirement" below). Warenskjold did not have a primary emphasis on modern "Method Acting" techniques or deep psychological involvement with the performance, but acknowledged that in practice she could end up doing some elements of this. While not thought of as a singing actress, her dramatic range was non-trivial, ranging from comical or novelty numbers such as Leo Blech's Telefonische Bestellung ("Telephone Order") to a Depuis Le Jour which led haunted listeners to request repeat performances of it on The Standard Hour radio program, to an "ingenious touch of hysteria" upon the Act 4 death of Valentin in her Marguerite with Jussi Bjorling, which according to critic Alexander Fried provided a needed counterbalance to her earlier vocal "limpid purity and taste" in a role with significant tragedy. Her development of complete characters included her unusual Micaela in Carmen, strong and emphatic arising from the depths of love (which drew demand from multiple Opera companies).

In recital, she would employ intelligent banter and humor, particularly during encores.

=== Touring and radio/television career ===
Warenskjold appeared as a guest artist with various other American opera companies and orchestras. In the years immediately after her SFO debut, she was repeatedly booked by the Monteux-era San Francisco Symphony. This included a strongly-reviewed run of Gustav Mahler's vocal-choral 2nd Symphony, "The Resurrection", in April 1951, conducted by Bruno Walter. Also particularly notable were her summer performance runs at the Cincinnati Zoo Opera for half a decade (1954-1958), and her appearances at the Hollywood Bowl.

Warenskjold regarded her solo recital touring throughout North America as an important calling; she did considerable research into finding song repertoire. Mostly under the Community Concerts program of Columbia Artists Management (CAMI), she maintained a level of 35-40 touring recitals a year for many seasons, with ticket sales aided by audiences having heard her on the radio. Her predominant piano accompanist was Rollin Andrew Jensen, but she also worked with Jack Crossan, her mother Mildred, and others. A "first in her career" occurred in the Pacific coast village of Port Townsend, Washington, in 1953, when she shattered the eyeglasses of a 12 year old child in the audience during a high note; the soprano said she had never succeeded when deliberately trying at home. Her mid-American recital touring was appreciated. In Monticello, Utah, then a town of 1,100 people, over 600 subscribed to her appearance in the opening of their new concert series. In Tulsa, Oklahoma, a local reviewer described the "totally unbearable announcement" of a Warenskjold cancellation.

In addition to her work on stage, she performed regularly on radio and early television during the 1940s and 1950s, enjoying singing Broadway repertoire interleaved with opera.

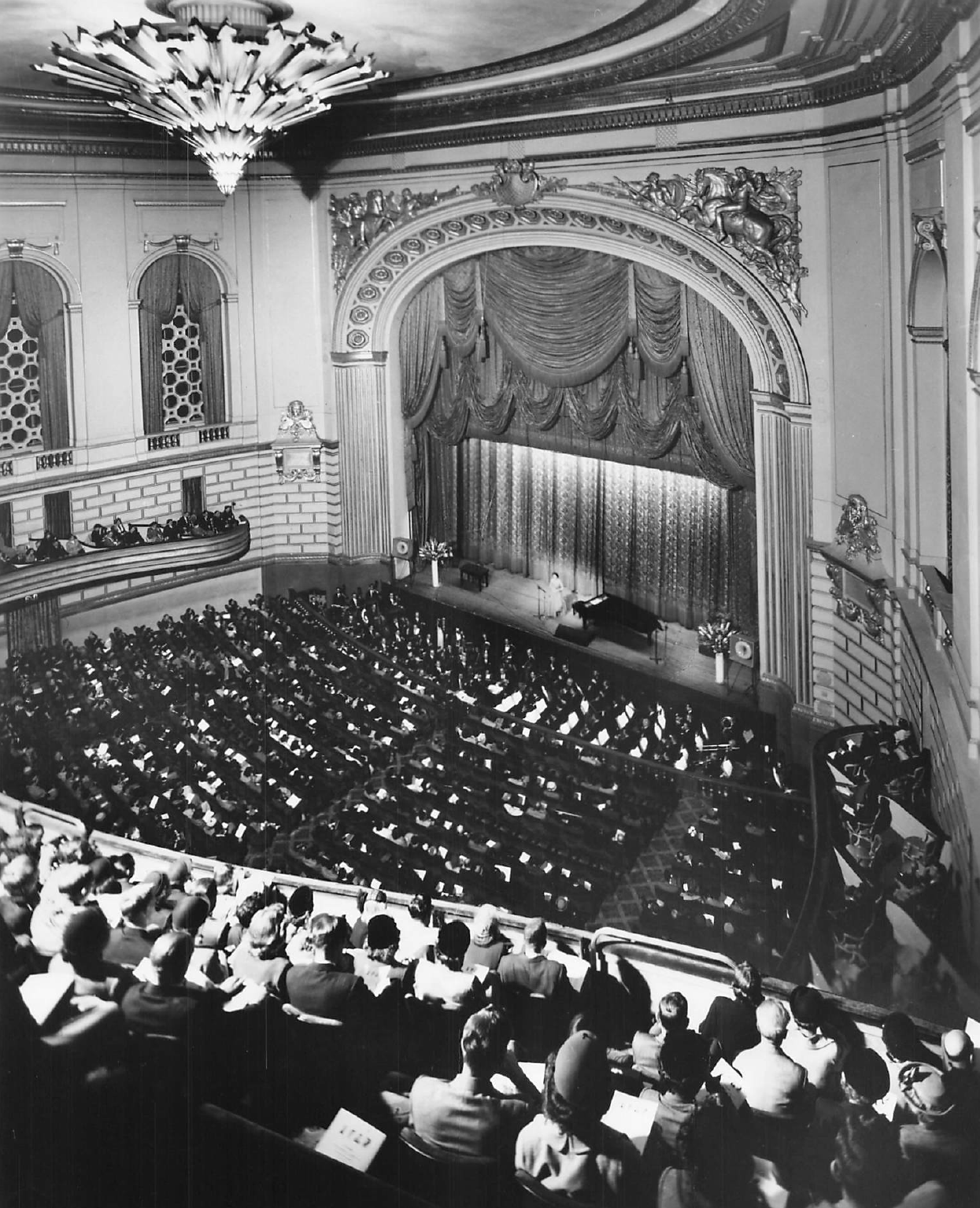
Standard Hour broadcast from the War Memorial Opera House. San Francisco Symphony in the pit, often Pierre Monteux on the baton, 10 ft concert grand stage left, Dorothy Warenskjold at the microphone. America west of the Rockies listening on AM radio via high-powered telephone lines.

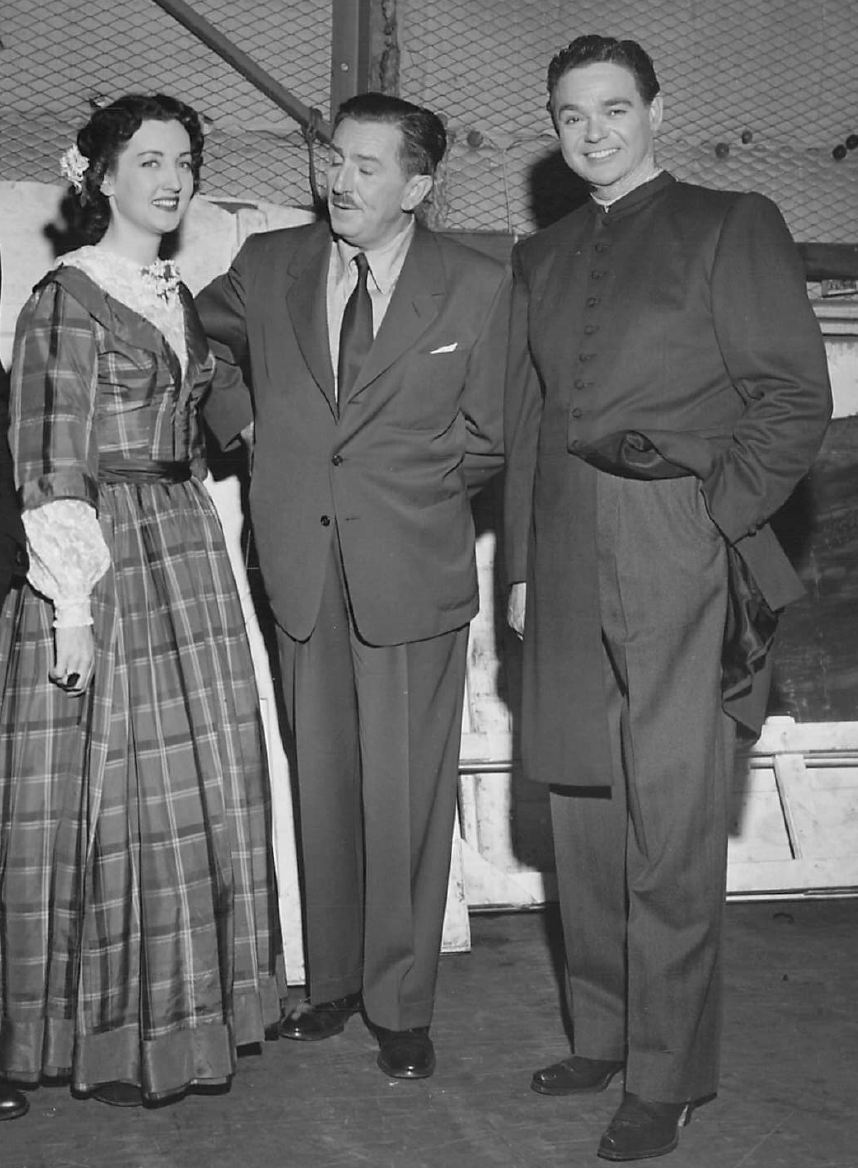
Dorothy Warenskjold with Walt Disney and tenor James Melton on the set of Melton's Ford Festival show

She was frequently heard on the programs Harvest of Stars, Ford Festival, The Standard Hour, The Standard Television Hour, The Standard School Broadcast, The Voice of Firestone, The Railroad Hour, Family Theater, and also on Armed Forces Radio Network. A recovered kinescope of her April 26, 1951, appearance on episode 4 of James Melton's Ford Festival TV show (alongside Victor Borge and Joan Bennett) is viewable online. In 1950, she performed the roles of Antonia and Stella in the NBC Opera Theatre's television production of The Tales of Hoffmann.

=== Days of glamour, Hollywood not, and the True Name Society ===
In the early 1950s, Warenskjold (age 29 as the decade began) drew fan magazine and gossip columnist attention, and was reported at significant social events. The August 7, 1953, edition of Radio-TV Life Magazine headlined her with the title “Music Hath Charms--and How”; following her article was a snippet pondering whether or not Frank Sinatra might be over the hill.

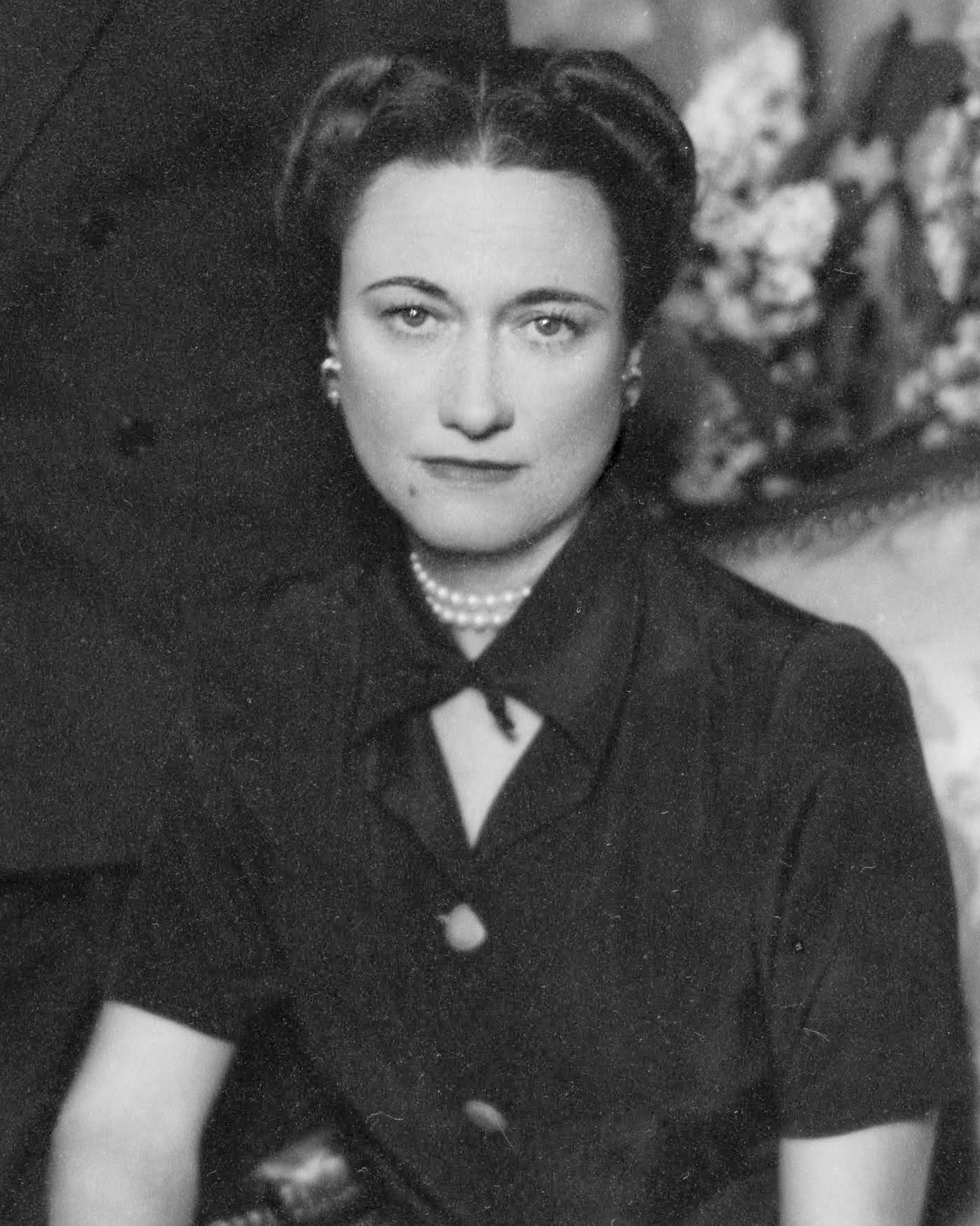
The Duchess of Windsor, ca. 1934

When Warenskjold was in New York during May-June 1950, newspapers reported that Sir Bernard Docker (Commodore of the Royal Thames Yacht Club of London and owner of the MY Shemara, one of the largest yachts in England) had thrown a luncheon in her honor at the New York Yacht Club as well as a cocktail party at the St. Regis Hotel, where she was staying. At another luncheon, at the 21 Club, she met Dr. Herbert Kalmus who led the development of technicolor. She was also invited to a bon voyage party for Hollywood Director Michael Curtiz onboard the RMS Queen Mary, in a suite adjacent to that of the Duke of Windsor, the former King Edward VIII. She wrote her mother that the Duchess of Windsor was far lovelier than any of her pictures. In October 1951, Warenskjold watchers rumored that “landscaping her with flowers” was Prince Sadruddin Aga Khan, 18 years old, the earnest, world-improving younger brother of socialite-diplomat Prince Aly Khan. In April 1952, it was reported in the Cholly Knickerbocker column and elsewhere that Prince Abdul Rahman bin Abdulaziz Al Saud, a son of Saudi Arabian King Ibn Saud, had offered to lend his private yacht to sail her to the Middle East, in hopes that she would improve the standards of singing in his land. There is no indication that she took him up on his offer.

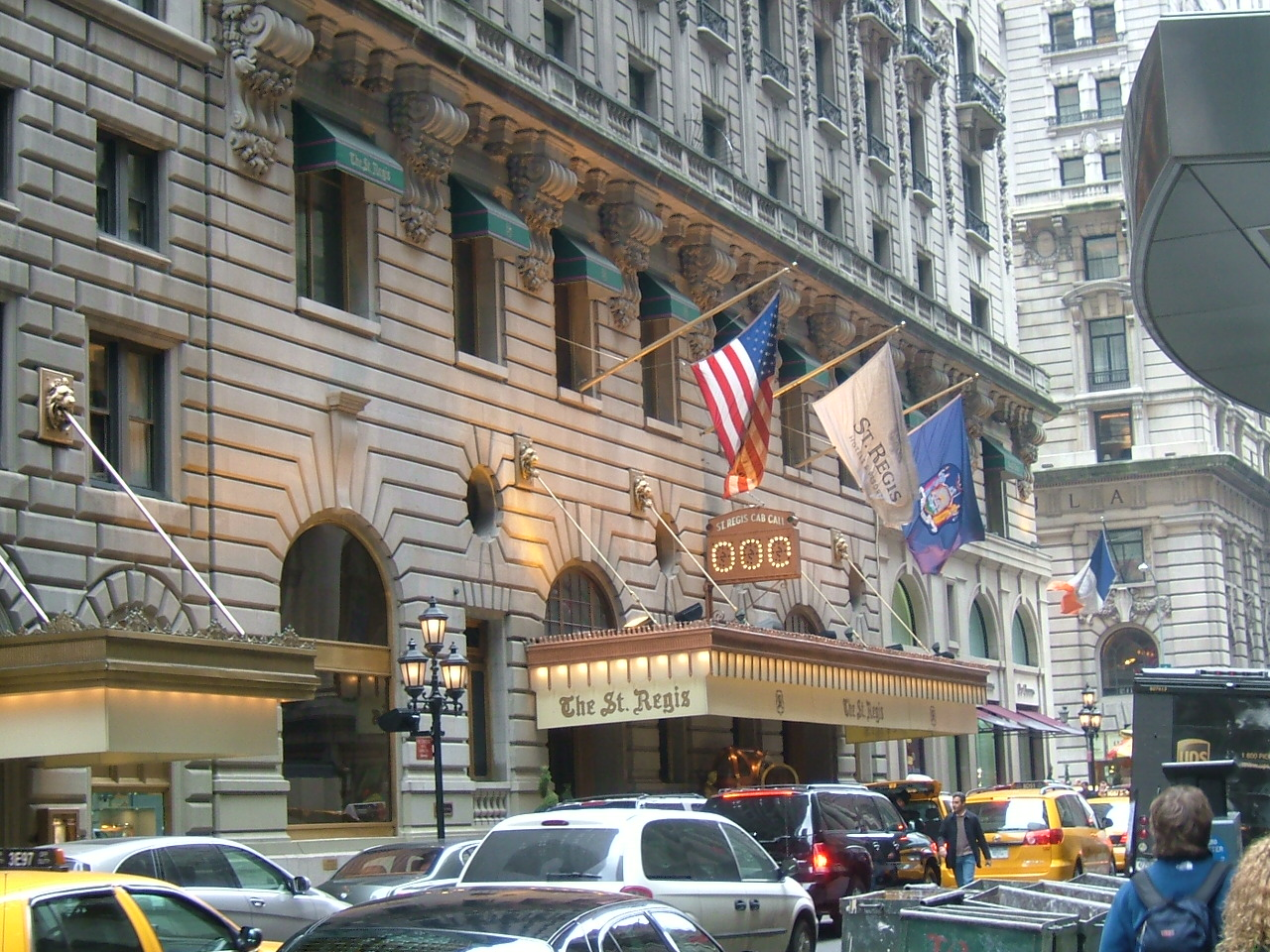
The St. Regis Hotel New York

News reports connected her with various other men. In one instance, actor Phillip Reed was seen squiring her in his long-time box at the Hollywood Bowl. In an unusual episode, East Coast nightclub singer Tony Bari was mocked by gossip and news columnist Walter Winchell as the “saddest stage door Johnny” when he lost 20 pounds on a ”tough” diet, fruitlessly attempting to win her favor. There is not an indication of these connections leading to anything serious (see Personal life below).

In July 1951, Warenskjold was noted at her first Hollywood premiere, an invitational preview of the MGM film version of Show Boat. It was also widely reported around this time that she had turned down several Hollywood film opportunities. She herself confirmed that she had screen tested for The Great Caruso, but had been engaged by James Melton for his Ford Festival television show before discussions could go any further; the role eventually went to Dorothy Kirsten, 11 years older. She later stated that at times she did not feel at home among Hollywood company. Another obstacle to film work was her flat refusal of demands that she change her last name, typically to "Warren".

Annoyed, she responded in 1951 by establishing the "True Name Society" (aka “True Name Association"). Honorary membership cards were mailed to over 1,000 actors and actresses who were reported to have refused to change their surnames. These included figures such as Rosemary Clooney, Gene Tierney, Debra Paget, Anne Baxter--and also Manhattan restaurateur Nicky Quattrociocchi. At the same time, she publicly called out a list of "Surname Sissy" name changers, including among others Frances Ethel Gumm, Virginia McMath, and Mary Van Losch (better known as Judy Garland, Ginger Rogers, and Marlene Dietrich).

One person in Warenskjold’s orbit who would have had files of such a multiplicity would have been her then press agent, Margaret Ettinger. In addition to having a Hollywood clientele, Ettinger was also a cousin of gossip columnist Louella Parsons.

=== Later career ===
Warenskjold stated that in 1951—at the peak of her RTV success—she had declined an offer from the Metropolitan Opera, and that it was a decision she later regretted for what might have been. Her RTV shows would go off the air one by one throughout the 1950s, except for the Standard School Broadcast. National Public Television and Public Radio would not provide a replacement outlet until the 1970s, by which time she was reaching retirement age.

Furthermore, during the 1960s, changing tastes and increasing prosperity shifted live audience demand towards group acts, causing a steady decline in the solo recital market. This, combined with the RTV cancellations, with Warenskjold no longer having an opera house base, and with the underlying prejudice in favor of European singers at the time, led to a very significant shrinkage of her career. She stated that by 1967 she was down to "about a dozen" touring performances for the year.

In response, in 1969, under her Columbia artists' management, Warenskjold formed a travelling musical group, "Dorothy Warenskjold's Musical Theater", with she herself serving as impresario, general director, vocal coach, and performer. The cast comprised Warenskjold, 8 additional (mostly younger) singers, and a veteran pianist, Raymond McFeeters (who had also been accompanist to Lily Pons, Marian Anderson, and Lawrence Tibbett). The first half of the program was an abridged Gounod Faust, with Warenskjold singing the role of Marguerite, and the second half was a history of the American musical theater, "From Minstrel to Musical". The group toured the U.S. and Canada for 3 seasons (1969-1971), averaging 45-50 performances per season. Critics and audiences were enthusiastic, but after the 1971 season, she discontinued the production due to exhaustion from running it.

In August 1972, the soprano was invited to sing at the 50th anniversary celebration of the San Francisco Opera, held outdoors at the Stern Grove redwood park. This would turn out to be her unofficial retirement event. Her signature Faust Jewel Song received multiple critical acclaim, with comments including "stunning" and "she continues to put many season regulars to shame".

Warenskjold did not sing again in public afterwards.

=== Post-retirement ===
Some while after retiring from singing in 1972, she joined the voice faculty of the UCLA School of the Arts and Architecture where she taught for many years as an adjunct professor, having declined the chairmanship of the vocal department.

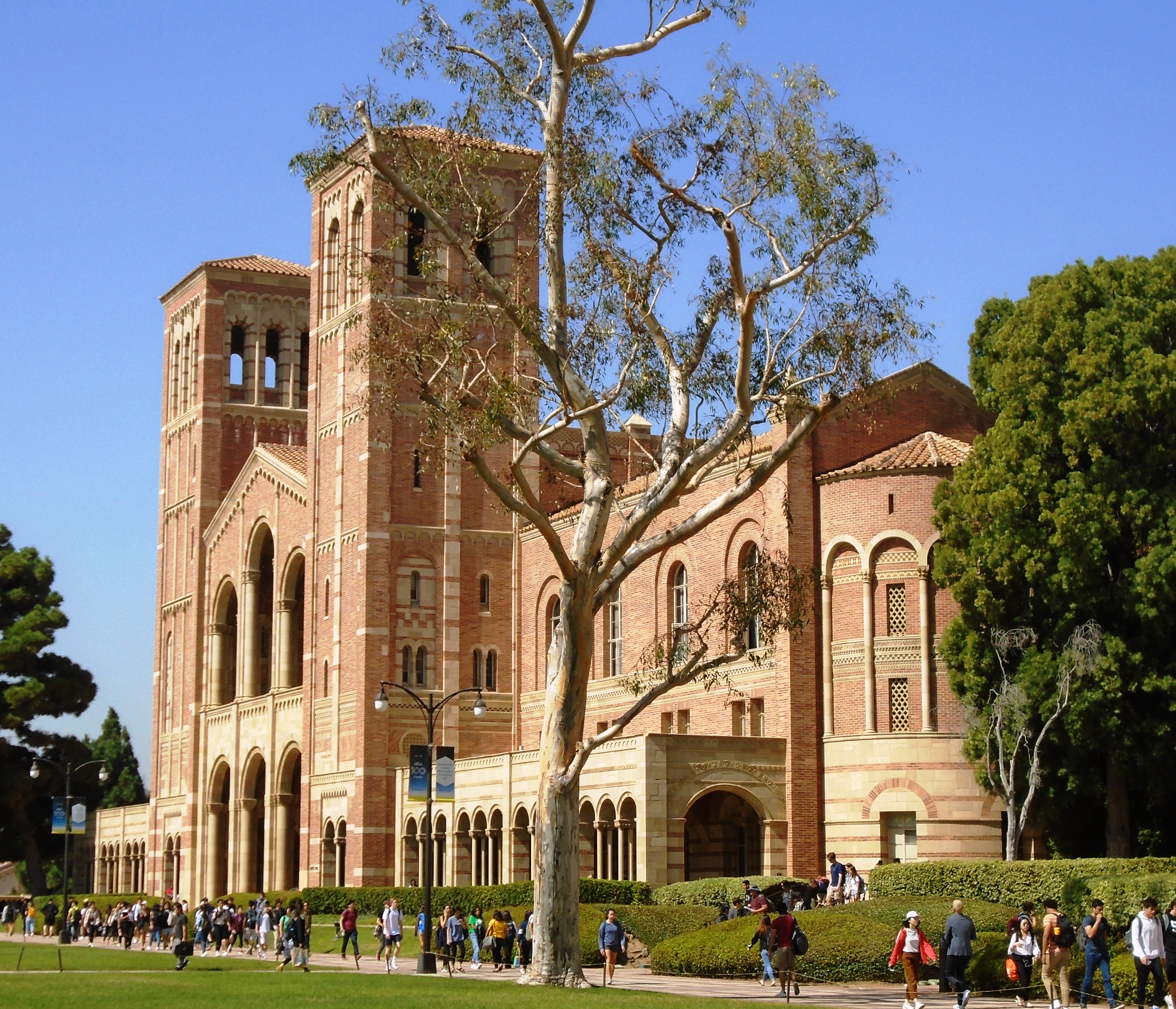
Royce Hall, Performing Arts Auditorium at UCLA

She continued and expanded her audition adjudicating, including for the Metropolitan Opera. During this time, a series of oral history interviews were conducted with her by Sybil Hast, the octolingual vocal diction coach of the department. The interview transcript is available from UCLA online; it runs 481 pages.

== Personal life ==
Dorothy Warenskjold never married. Her fiancé had been shot down during World War II, over the German fleet base at Kiel in 1943, leaving her devastated. She was a buoyant person and eventually resumed social relations with other suitors, but her constant musical touring and travelling were a complication. When not on tour, she lived mainly with family (in the San Francisco Bay area before 1953, and thereafter in the Los Angeles area) until her mother's death in 1991. Her many friends included figures such as San Francisco operatic passepartout James Schwabacher, Los Angeles Daily News Woman's Editor Dorothy Dietz, philanthropist Noel Sullivan, champion dog breeder/sometime opera journalist Lilian Barber, recorded sound restorer/California historian Lance Bowling, and prominent musical names such as Licia Albanese, Lotte Lehmann and James Melton, among others.

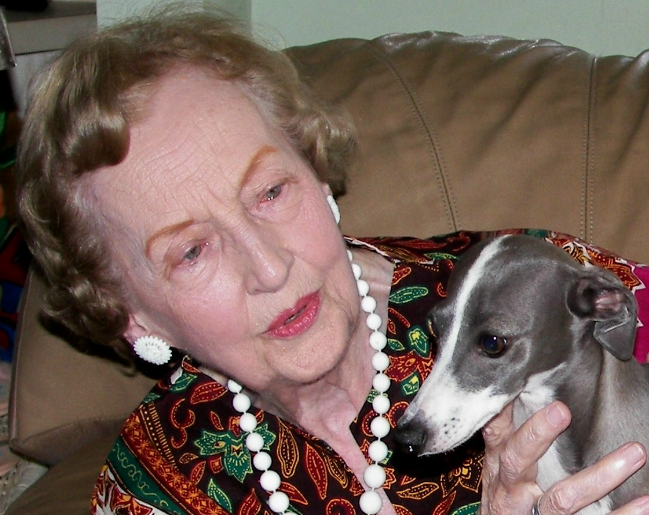
Dorothy Warenskjold in Lilian Barber's home at age 87, August 2008. Courtesy of Lilian Barber.

In 2004, she moved to Lenexa, Kansas to be near remaining family. She died there two days after Christmas, 2010, at age 89.

In memoriam, opera commentator and frequent Texaco Metropolitan Opera Broadcast panelist Bruce Burroughs wrote, "...one of the loveliest of all lyric soprano voices of the last 70 years...an under-appreciated, wonderful American artist." James Forrest wrote, "Another under-utilized American artist; a lovely voice."

== Discography ==
Few recordings were released of Dorothy Warenskjold during her career. Los Angeles Times reviewer Allan Ulrich wrote: "In her prime...the California-born and trained soprano was flagrantly ignored by commercial record companies." However, digital restorers commenced additional archival releases after her retirement.

Warenskjold's intra-career releases totalled three—one as sidekick to Hollywood and Broadway star Gordon MacRae (who had been her leading man on The Railroad Hour radio show), and two in her own right:

- Songs from “The Student Prince”, 1953, LP, Capitol (L-407), with Gordon MacRae, George Greeley conducting.
- Songs of Grieg and Dvořák, 1954, LP, Capitol (P-8247), George Greeley again conducting, with the Concert Arts Orchestra. Eight Grieg songs; seven gypsy songs and 4 love songs by Antonín Dvořák.
- "On Wings of Song", 1955, LP, Capitol (P-8333). Solo, with Jack Crossan on piano.

Used availability of these Capitol discs is uneven. Variants included overseas releases, bundlings, and a cut-down 45 RPM "extended play" (EP) of the Grieg/Dvořák songs (Capitol FAP-8250).

Commencing in 1979, seven years after Warenskjold's retirement, a series of audio and video restorers—Steve Markham (Grand Prix Records), Lance Bowling (Cambria Master Recordings), Richard Caniell (Immortal Performances), Allan Altman/Edward Cardona (Video Artists International, VAI) and staff at OTRCAT (Old Time Radio Catalog)--began releasing discs from her archival performance and broadcast material. Los Angeles Times reviewer Allan Ulrich further wrote of the second of the Grand Prix discs: "A revelation and a confirmation of native vocal talent...golden-throated." A highlight of the Warenskjold archival releases, is a number of tracks with Pierre Monteux as conductor.

Seven archival releases have occurred as of late 2025; the first four were done in cooperation with Warenskjold herself:

- "A Recital Experience with Dorothy Warenskjold", 1979, LP, Grand Prix Records (GP 9003). Rollin Andrew Jensen at the piano.
- "Mozart and other Opera Arias", 1984, LP, Grand Prix Records (GP 9010).
- "A Treasury of Operatic Heroines", 1999, CD, Cambria Master Recordings (CD-1111).
- "The Golden Years of Broadcast Music", 2009, CD, Cambria Master Recordings (CD-1192).
- "Der Rosenkavalier", 2016, 4 CD set, Immortal Performances (IPCD 1050-4). Disc 4 features Warenskjold as Sophie in Scenes from Der Rosenkavalier, recorded from a Los Angeles Philharmonic Auditorium radio broadcast in 1959 (The record jacket statement that it was recorded at the Hollywood Bowl is incorrect). Co-stars are Lisa Della Casa and Mildred Miller. Three unrelated solo Warenskjold arias are also included. The first three disks of the set comprise a complete Rosenkavalier with a different cast—Della Casa and others (Immortal Performances in Canada, as opposed to a similarly-named audio restorer in Texas).
- "The Golden Age of Singing", 2024, DVD ongoing series, VAI. Warenskjold sings the Charpentier aria Depuis Le Jour on one track of Vol. 3, "The Scandinavians", ( VAI 4703), and the final trio from Faust in Vol. 4, "The Italians", ( VAI 4704), with Cesare Valletti and Cesare Siepi. These are restored from Voice of Firestone archival kinescopes.
- "The Railroad Hour", 2025, 6 MP3-CD set (or 138 audio CD), OTRCAT Old Time Radio Catalog. Warenskjold appears as the female lead in over 60 episodes. Show scripts were miniatures of historical themes or much-loved operettas, with music arranged and conducted by Carmen Dragon. This comprises the largest mass of publicly available Warenskjold recorded material.

The Grand Prix LP's are difficult to find. However, they are also digitally available from the Cambria Master Recordings Amazon store (though not at present on the Cambria website) in MP3 format, and from eClassical in the higher-fidelity FLAC 16. All CDs and DVDs are still (late 2024) available from the respective websites.

Other pieces of Warenskjold recorded material are variously available. Several Voice of Firestone song tracks are on YouTube, often with unrestored sound but visual stills added, as are several Railroad Hour episodes. Warenskjold also sings The Star Spangled Banner in the opening track of "Hail America", LP, RCA Custom Records (RR3S-1430), Carmen Dragon conductor and arranger. This recording of patriotic songs, featuring various well-known singers, was given out to children participating in the school version of the Standard Hour radio program. Numerous examples are available used. A tribute to George London (bass-baritone), featuring Warenskjold in no fewer than 4 duets and 2 solos, was released on VHS in 1990 (and later on DVD) by the now-defunct Kultur in New Jersey. It is based on Voice of Firestone video originally restored by VAI. Copies are vanishingly rare.

Copies of a 1954 New Orleans Opera Carmen featuring Warenskjold are on eBay. The sound, unrestored, is from a primitive house wire recorder. But this 2-CD set remains the only publicly available complete Warenskjold operatic performance--and in one of her signature roles as Micaela.
