= The Railroad Hour =

US radio program

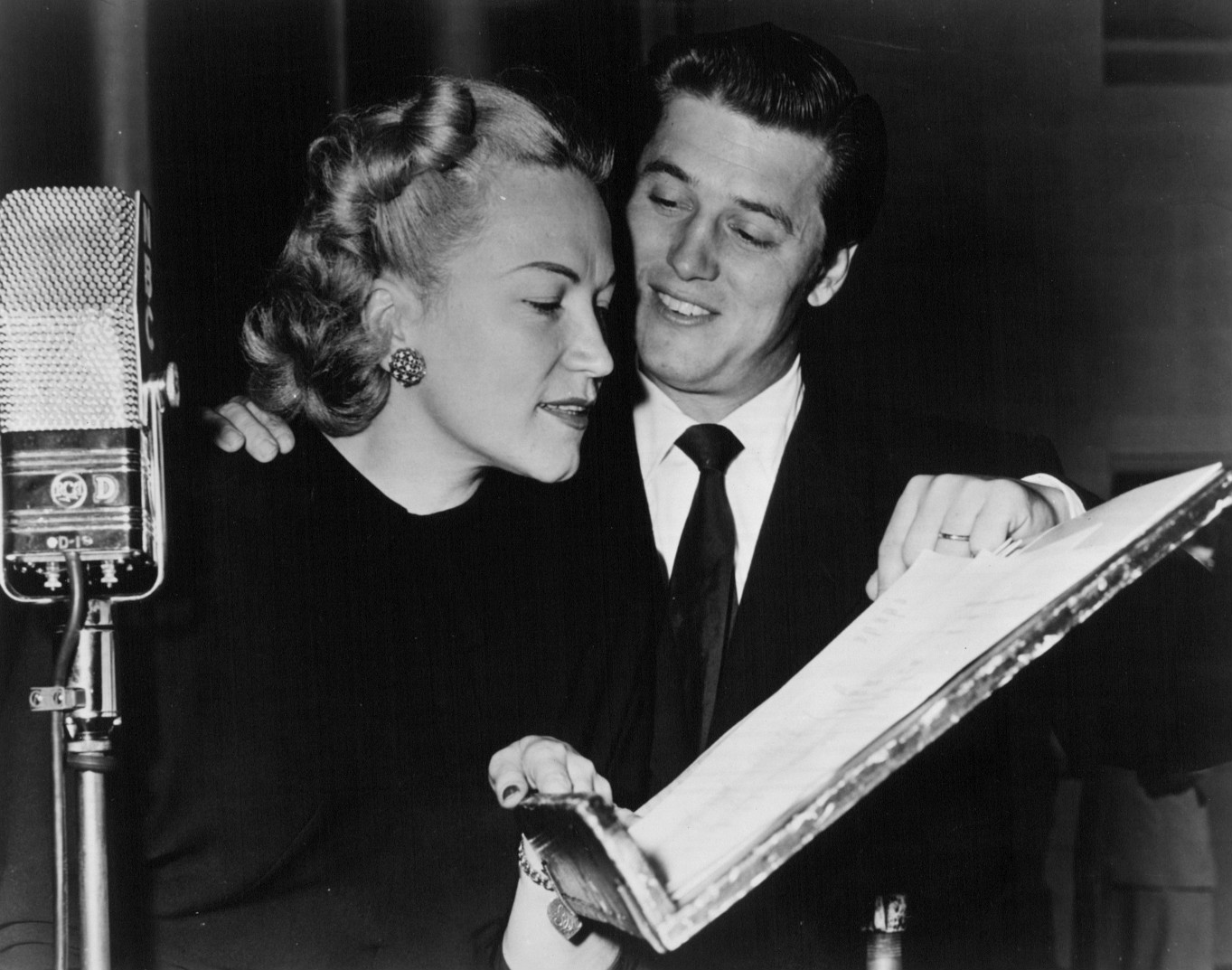
Dorothy Kirsten and Gordon MacRae at work on the program, 1950

The Railroad Hour was a radio series of musical dramas and comedies broadcast from the late 1940s to the mid-1950s.

Sponsored by the Association of American Railroads, the series condensed musicals and operettas to shorter lengths, concentrating on those written before 1943. Singer-actor Gordon MacRae starred in scripts by Jean Holloway, Jerome Lawrence and Robert Edwin Lee. Marvin Miller was the announcer. Warren Barker, at the age of 24, was appointed chief arranger for The Railroad Hour, a position he held for six years. The show's musical director was Carmen Dragon.

With its theme song, "I've Been Working on the Railroad", the series began on ABC October 4, 1948 as a 45-minute program, advertised as "World's Greatest Musical Comedies." It was reduced to 30 minutes on April 25, 1949, continuing until September 26, 1949. It then moved to NBC for a run from October 3, 1949, until June 21, 1954. On both networks it aired Monday evenings at 8pm (Eastern).

== Shows and performers ==
The Railroad Hour ad on a desk blotter.

MacRae sang on The Railroad Hour and was the program's master of ceremonies. Doris Day co-starred with MacRae in No, No, Nanette and Jane Powell co-starred in Brigadoon. Other offerings included The Desert Song, Holiday Inn, The Merry Widow, The Mikado, Naughty Marietta, Show Boat, Song of Norway, State Fair, The Student Prince and The Vagabond King. Soprano Dorothy Kirsten, Dorothy Warenskjold and Lucille Norman were frequent co-stars. Kirsten, Warenskjold, Rise Stevens and other performers on The Railroad Hour were also regular guests on Harvest of Stars during the late 1940s.

The October 4, 1948, episode was "Good News" with Jane Powell and Dinah Shore.

Gerald Wilson and Martin Grams, Jr. documented the program in their book The Railroad Hour (BearManor Media, 2007). It features an episode guide listing all 299 episodes with titles of all songs in correct sequence and the vocalist for each song, plus the origins of all musicals with plots and cast lists.

Many scripts for the series are on file at the Ohio State University's Jerome Lawrence and Robert E. Lee Theatre Research Institute.

== Sources ==
- Kreuger, Miles. Show Boat: The Story of a Classic American Musical, Appendix, Oxford, 1977.
- Wilson, Gerald and Martin Grams, Jr. The Railroad Hour. Albany Georgia: BearManor Media, 2007.
- Woods, Alan. The Selected Plays of Jerome Lawrence and Robert E. Lee. Columbus: Ohio State University Press, 1995.

== Listen to ==
- The Railroad Hour in the Internet Archive's Old-Time Radio Collection
- OTR Network: The Railroad Hour (11 episodes)
- The Railroad Hour at the Old Time Radio Researchers Library
