= Alfred Hertz =

Prussian-born conductor

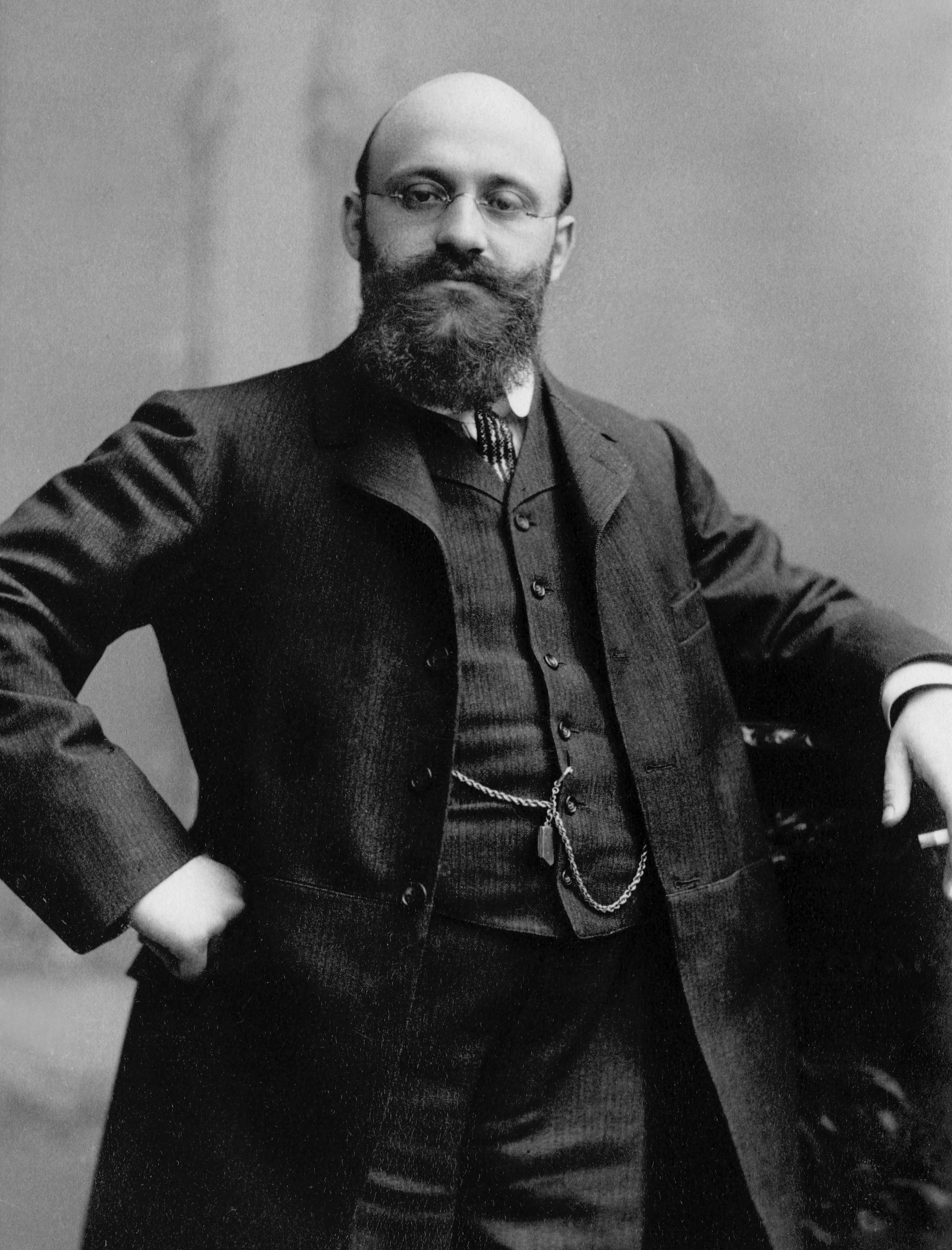
Alfred Hertz in 1904 (Photo Aimé Dupont)

Alfred Hertz (15 July 1872 – 17 April 1942) was a Prussian-born conductor.

== Early life ==
He was born in Frankfurt, Province of Hesse-Nassau, Prussia (in present-day Germany). As a child, he contracted infantile paralysis and walked with a cane after that.

In 1898, Hertz met the British composer Frederick Delius, who was then living in Paris, and on 30 May 1899, at the age of 26, Hertz conducted the first concert of Delius's music, in St James's Hall in London.

== Career ==
Hertz first came to prominence conducting Wagner at the Metropolitan Opera in New York. Some of the performances he conducted were experimentally recorded by the Met's librarian Lionel Mapleson on what are now known as the Mapleson Cylinders and later issued on LP. He first came to San Francisco as a conductor of the Metropolitan Opera during its 1906 tour and was present when the city was devastated by earthquake and fire.

In 1913 he conducted the Berlin Philharmonic's first recording session, in excerpts from Parsifal. He later became music director of the San Francisco Symphony, a post he held from 1915 to 1930, receiving praise and a cover story in Time for his leadership and accomplishments. Longtime San Francisco violinist David Schneider noted, in his history of the orchestra, that Hertz returned as a guest conductor of the orchestra after 1930.

Hertz led the San Francisco Symphony's first recordings, for the Victor Talking Machine Company, released from 1925 to 1930. The initial recordings were made with the old acoustical process in Victor's Oakland plant, where the orchestra's first electric recordings were also made; the 1927 recordings were made in the Columbia Theater, which was renamed the Geary Theater, in San Francisco, and the 1928 sessions took place in Oakland's Scottish Rite Auditorium. The recordings have been digitally remastered and were issued for the first time on CD by Pristine Classical, as the San Francisco Symphony celebrated its centennial during the 2011–2012 season.

Hertz also conducted the orchestra in its first radio broadcasts, beginning in 1926. After 1930, Hertz guest conducted the orchestra, including The Standard Hour radio broadcasts on NBC. Hertz spent much of later life in Berkeley, California (where a UC Berkeley concert hall, the Alfred Hertz Memorial Concert Hall, is named after him), but died in San Francisco, at age 69 from heart disease.

Hubert Roussel, longtime music critic for the Houston Post, notes that Hertz also served as a guest conductor for the Houston Symphony during its 1935–1936 season (a period when it was without a music director), calling Hertz's concerts there a turning point in that orchestra's search for quality. The guest conductor insisted that the orchestra's board hire five new musicians he considered needful, and gave the then provincial Texas ensemble "the most strict and intensive music lessons it had ever sustained." Writes Roussel: "No one who attended that season would ever forget the visit of its midwinter conductor, or the things he did with the orchestra.... [Alfred Hertz's concerts] form a cardinal page in the musical history of the city, for they showed it for the first time what its orchestra could be like, given certain improvements and with the full authority present before it."
