= The Standard School Broadcast =

American radio program

The Standard School Broadcast is a weekly educational radio program that went on the air in 1928 and promoted music appreciation for students in the western United States. It was the oldest educational radio program in America. Based in San Francisco, California, the series was carried on NBC radio stations and via syndication. The Standard School Broadcast was devoted to music and American history. Carmen Dragon was music director of the programs for many years. The program's sponsor, Standard Oil of California, was honored with a Peabody Award for the series in 1958. In 1975, the program received the Peabody Institutional Award "for 47 years of continuous educational radio service".

== History ==
The Standard School Broadcast began in October 1928 and was first heard in 72 schools via the NBC Pacific Network. It predated the comparable CBS Radio series, The American School of the Air. Some sources label it "the oldest educational radio program in the United States", though in the spring of 1924, Chicago's WLS (AM) began airing "The Little Red Schoolhouse Hour", or the "Little Red Schoolhouse of the Air" educational program, considered as the nation's first school of the air.

The series presented hundreds of topics including the science of music, music as drama, and non-classical forms including jazz and folk. Guests ranged from Dorothy Warenskjold to Louis Armstrong. It evolved from a simple lecture program accompanied by a string trio into a program that combined concert hall, stage and documentary, with a symphony orchestra conducted by Carmen Dragon and a cast of professional performers.

The Standard School Broadcast was a companion to the classical music radio program, The Standard Hour. Both were sponsored by Standard Oil of California. The Standard School Broadcast ran on NBC radio and, later, in syndication on the West Coast.

A 1943 brochure shows that the programs were carried on KPO in San Francisco, KFI in Los Angeles, KMJ in Fresno, KGW in Portland, Oregon, KOMO in Seattle, Washington, KHQ in Spokane, Washington, KMED in Medford, Oregon, KDYL in Salt Lake City, Utah, KTAR in Phoenix, Arizona, KGLU in Safford, Arizona, KVOA in Tucson, Arizona, and KYUM in Yuma, Arizona, on Thursday at 10 a.m. Pacific time and 11 a.m. Mountain time. At that time, Carl Kalesch was the music director for the programs and John Grover was the announcer.

The theme music for The Standard School Broadcast, as well as The Standard Hour, was "This Hour Is Yours". The theme was composed by Julius Haug, a violinist in the San Francisco Symphony Orchestra.

"It was simple theme music, 45 seconds long," wrote radio historian John Dunning, "and listeners who loved it and requested 'the entire piece' were surprised when told there was no more."

For many years, the broadcasts originated from NBC's largest radio studio in San Francisco. in the building which housed the network's KPO (later renamed KNBC and then KNBR).

Besides John Grover, announcers for the broadcasts included Hale Sparks and Fred Jorgenson. Many of the programs were preserved on transcription discs or magnetic tape.

== Accolades ==
In 1958, The Standard School Broadcast received a Peabody Award for radio education, "in recognition of continuous expansion and development over a 30-year period. This outstanding music appreciation series for schools combines educational value with highest musicianship, expert production, and utilization of appropriate musical groups of all types, instrumental and vocal."

In 1975, The Standard School Broadcast received the Peabody Institutional Award:

The Standard School Broadcast's 47 years on the air throughout the Western states is an achievement to which any broadcaster could point with pride. It is doubly impressive to note that its programming has always been imaginative and entertaining as well as commercial-free. Its performers have included many of the world’s most distinguished musicians and almost single-handedly it has introduced the joys of good music to several generations of listeners.

== Home media ==
A few episodes of The Standard School Broadcast are available from old-time radio program collectors.

In the 1970s, the Chevron Research Company released a series of recordings edited from The Standard School Broadcast as a public service. The LP records, with teachers guides, were available free of charge to elementary and junior high schools throughout the West, Rocky Mountain area and the Southwest. These out-of-print recordings have been sold on various websites.

=== Our Nation's Heritage ===
- 1970: Prologue to America
- 1970: The New World
- 1970: Exploring the New World
- 1970: Europe in the New World
- 1970: The English in America
- 1970: The Colonial Frontier
- 1970: The Revolutionary War
- 1972: The New Nation is Launched
- 1972: The New Nation is Tested
- 1972: The Nation Expands
- 1972: The Nation Divided
- 1972: Settling the West
- 1972: The Industrial Revolution in America
- 1972: The Twentieth Century Begins
- 1972: The Nation in Prosperity and Poverty
- 1972: America in World War II
- 1973: America at Mid-Century
- 1973: America Through Five Centuries — Epilogue

=== Music Makers ===
- 1973: Guitar (two-LP set)
- 1973: Percussion (two-LP set)
- 1975: Brass
- 1975: Keyboard (two-LP set)
- 1975: Strings (two-LP set)
- 1975: Woodwinds and Reeds
