= Mabel Riegelman =

American opera singer

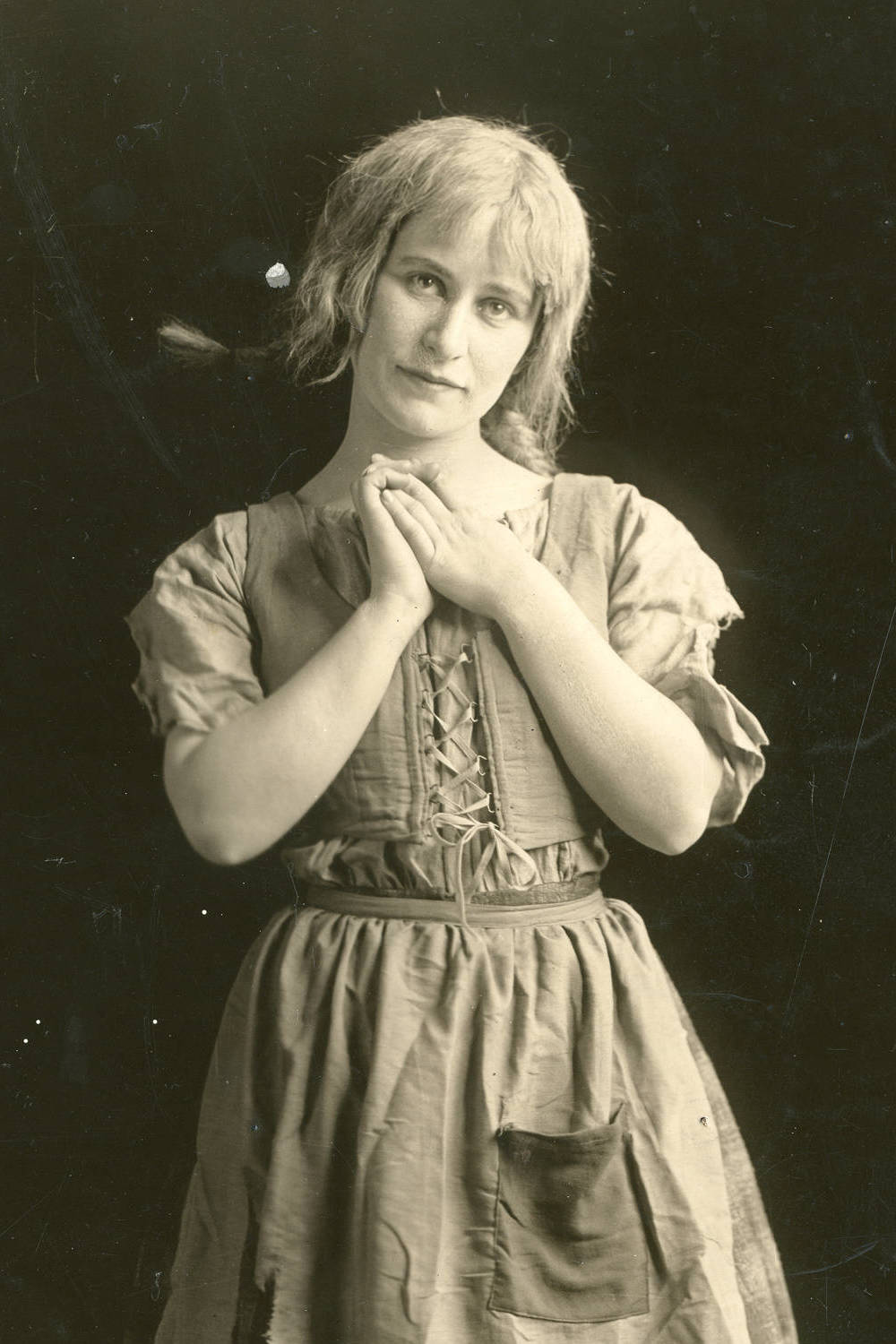
- Mabel Riegelman in costume as Gretel, 1913.
- Born: Mabel Isabel Riegelman; April 1, 1886; Cincinnati, Ohio
- Died: December 18, 1967 (aged 79); Burlingame, California
- Occupation: Opera singer

Mabel Isabel Riegelman (April 1, 1886 – December 18, 1967) was a popular American operatic soprano.

== Early life ==
Riegelman was born into a Jewish family in Cincinnati, Ohio, the daughter of Meyer Riegelmann and Rachel Isaacs Riegelmann. Her father was born in Ohio to German immigrants, and her mother was born in Australia to English Jews and immigrated to the United States as a teenager. Riegelman's family moved to California when she was a child.

Riegelman was "discovered" in San Francisco by Johanna Gadski, opera diva from Stettin. Gadski and the two Riegelman sisters (Mabel, the singer, and her younger sister Ruby, the pianist) traveled to Stettin under Gadski's tutelage.

== Career ==
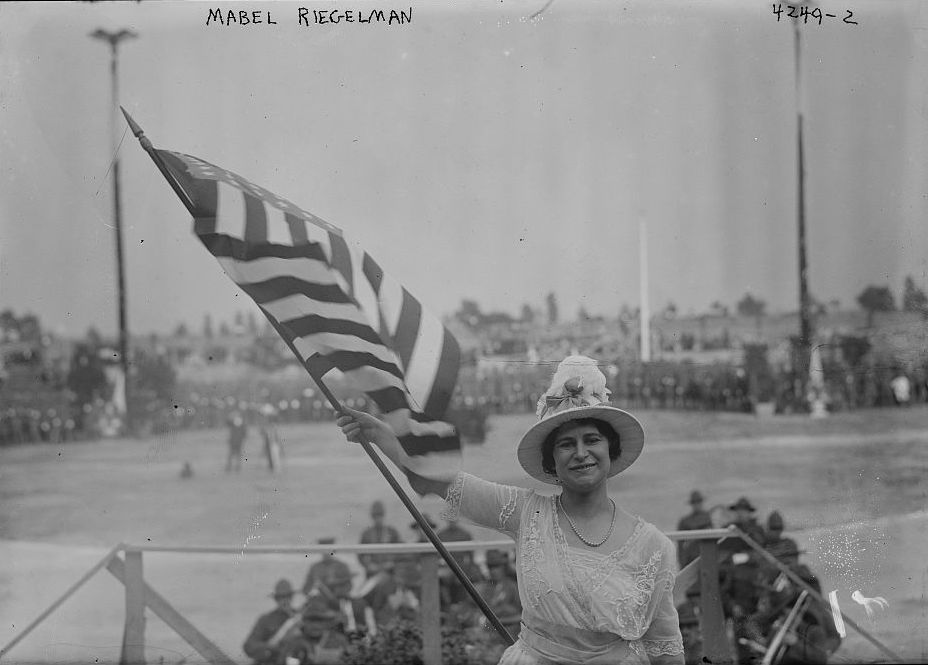
Mabel Riegelman on June 23, 1917 at the Lewisohn Stadium of the College of the City of New York

Riegelman made her American operatic debut at the Metropolitan Opera, New York City, singing Gretel in Englebert Humperdinck's Hansel and Gretel, which became her signature role. Riegelman soon became a prima donna soprano. She was connected with the Chicago Grand Opera Company and Boston Opera Company. In Europe, she performed with the Stettin Grand Opera and the Plauen Grand Opera Co.

Other parts Riegelman sang included Urbain in Les Huguenots (1910), Barbarina in Le Nozze de Figaro (1911), Rose in Lakme (1911), Siebel in Faust (1911), Noemie in Cendrillon (1911, 1912), Concetta and Stella in Jewels of the Madonna (1912), Crobyle and Myrtale in Thaïs (1912), Little Yniold in Pelleas et Melisande (1912), Musette in La bohème (1913), and the title role in Mignon (1913). In 1926 she made a recording, Songs My Mother Taught Me.

Riegelman promoted municipal opera houses across the United States: "We should do as well by our opera houses as we do by the movies," she told an Oakland newspaper in 1918. "There should be a municipally endowed opera house in every city, and if that were the case there would be more opera given outside of New York, Chicago, Boston, and Philadelphia." She also taught voice; one of her students in San Francisco was Dorothy Warenskjold.

Riegelman gave benefit concerts to support war relief during World War I. Her brother Carl Robert Riegelman was injured in a 1919 train accident in France, while serving in the United States Navy.

== Personal life ==
Riegelman married lawyer Marcus Lorne Samuels in 1913. They had one son, Lorne R. Samuels. They lived at 485 California St., San Francisco, California. She was burned and injured by an electrical shock when a lamp in her home malfunctioned in 1928. In 1932, her professionally loud screams helped thwart a burglary at their home. She died in December 1967, in her late seventies, in Burlingame, California.
