= The Standard Hour =

The Standard Hour, also known as The Standard Symphony Hour, was a weekly radio broadcast by the San Francisco Symphony Orchestra and the San Francisco Opera first heard in 1926. The series was carried on the NBC Pacific radio network on Sundays at 8:30 p.m. Pacific time.

== History ==
Also called The Standard Symphony Hour, The Standard Hour was sponsored by Standard Oil of California. The series began in 1926 in San Francisco, when the San Francisco Symphony faced bankruptcy. Standard Oil of California paid the orchestra's debts and in return was given broadcast rights to that year's concert series. A tradition of more than 30 years began with the first broadcast on the NBC Pacific Network, on October 24, 1926.

"Though it was heard only on a partial network," wrote radio historian John Dunning, "The Standard Hour was a major musical series that spanned the entire length of network broadcasting."

A 1943 brochure shows that the programs were carried on KPO in San Francisco, KFI in Los Angeles, KMJ in Fresno, KGW in Portland, Oregon, KOMO in Seattle, Washington, and KHQ in Spokane, Washington. The Sunday-evening series was ultimately heard in Hawaii and Alaska.

The theme music for The Standard Hour, as well as a complementary radio series for children called The Standard School Broadcast, was "This Hour Is Yours". The theme was composed by Julius Haug, a violinist in the San Francisco Symphony Orchestra.

"It was simple theme music, 45 seconds long," wrote John Dunning, "and listeners who loved it and requested 'the entire piece' were surprised when told there was no more."

From 1935 to 1952, the broadcasts often featured the San Francisco Symphony's music director, Pierre Monteux. Other conductors on the broadcasts included Alfred Hertz, Sir Thomas Beecham and Werner Janssen. Arthur Fiedler, who led the San Francisco Symphony's "pops" concerts from 1949 to 1979, conducted several of the broadcast concerts in 1950 and 1951.

A number of these broadcasts were preserved on transcription discs or magnetic tape. Some have been released on CD, including many of Monteux's concerts in the War Memorial Opera House.

For more than two decades from the 1930s through the 1950s, NBC Radio broadcast programs of live classical concerts from California. The autumn months were dedicated to the San Francisco Opera, with its stars singing under the baton of its founder and general director, Gaetano Merola. Many of his singers were from the Metropolitan Opera, but a number came directly from Europe.

The show's final broadcast was in 1955.

== Accolades ==
In 1952, NBC Radio received a Peabody Award for the contributions of The Standard Symphony:

First, outstanding once-a-week symphonic broadcasts over 11 western states, since October 24, 1926, through which Standard Oil of California achieved a priceless public service; secondly, a radio series of highly effective educational features for school children; and, latterly, a schedule of brilliant television presentations over Pacific Coast and inter-mountain facilities, known as The Standard Hour, which also maintained the highest levels of production excellence.
