= San Francisco Symphony =

American symphony orchestra in San Francisco, California, United States

- Orchestra
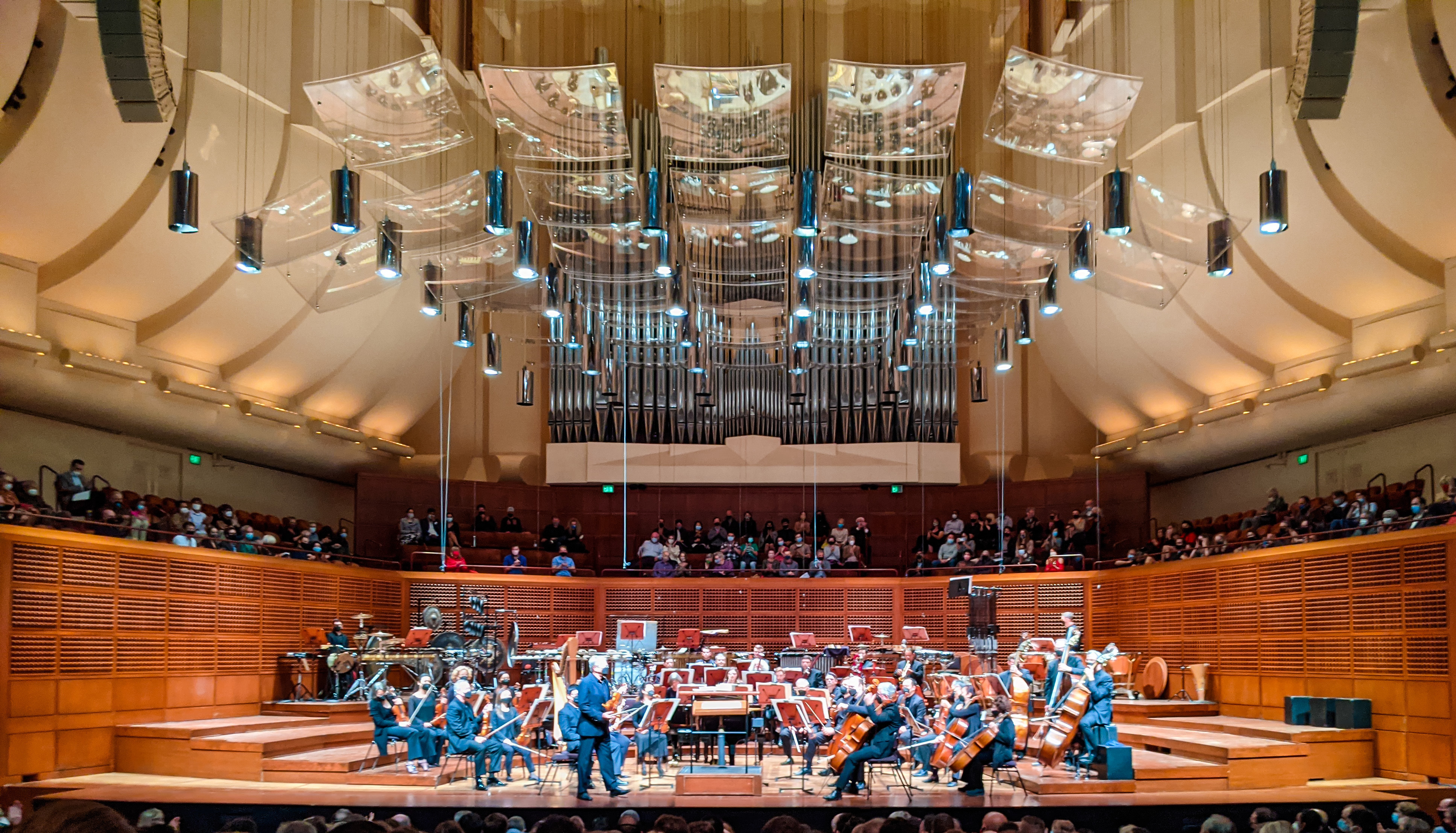
- Orchestra at Davies Symphony Hall, San Francisco, California, October 2021
- Founded: 1911; 115 years ago
- Location: San Francisco, California, U.S.
- Concert hall: Louise M. Davies Symphony Hall at San Francisco War Memorial and Performing Arts Center
- Music director: Elim Chan (designate, effective autumn 2027)
- Website: sfsymphony.org
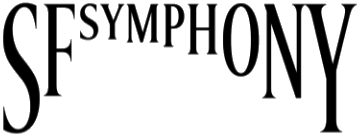

The San Francisco Symphony is an American orchestra based in San Francisco, California. Founded in 1911, the orchestra has been resident at Louise M. Davies Symphony Hall in the city's Hayes Valley neighborhood since 1980. The San Francisco Symphony Youth Orchestra (founded in 1981) and the San Francisco Symphony Chorus (1972) are part of the organization.

Recent past music directors have included Herbert Blomstedt, Michael Tilson Thomas and Esa-Pekka Salonen. Elim Chan is the orchestra's music director-designate, scheduled to assume the post full-time in the autumn of 2027.

== History ==
=== The early years ===
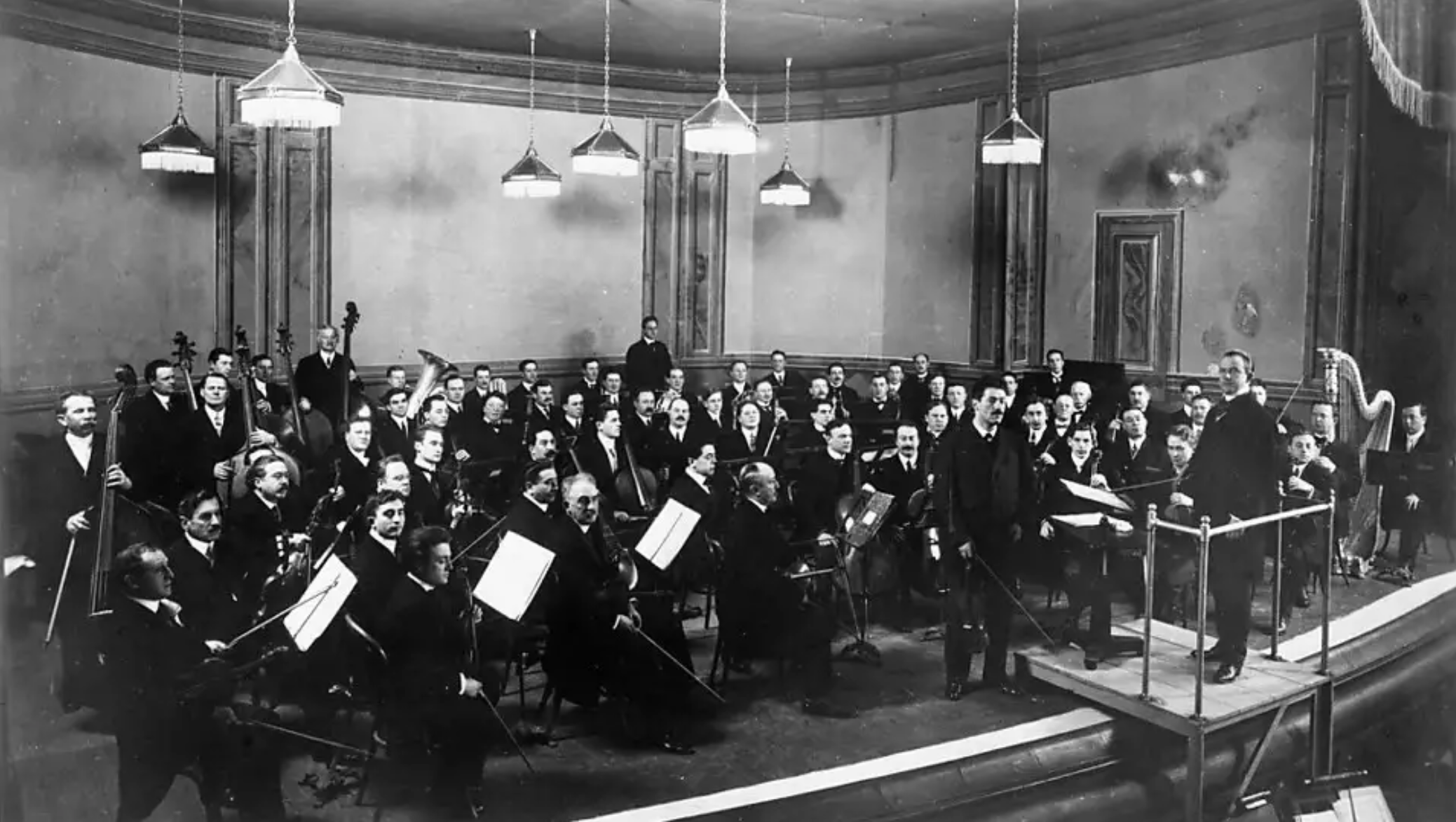
San Francisco Symphony (SFS) at the Cort Theatre for its inaugural concert on December 8, 1911. The SFS continued to perform at the theatre through 1922.

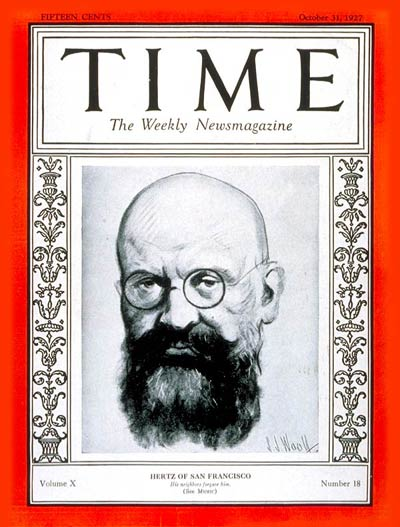
Alfred Hertz on the cover of Time magazine, October 1927

In 1909 the Musical Association (MA) was founded by a group of San Francisco citizens with the goal of establishing a professional symphony orchestra in San Francisco. Among the founding board members of the MA was composer, lawyer, and opera librettist Joseph Redding. Redding played an instrumental role in steering the MA's board during the establishment of the San Francisco Symphony and it is largely through his recommendation that conductor-composer Henry Kimball Hadley was appointed San Francisco Symphony's first principal conductor. Redding also selected the orchestra's first concertmaster, the Dutch violinist Eduard Tak. The governing board of the MA continued to manage the San Francisco Symphony until 1935.

The orchestra's first concerts were led by Hadley in 1911. There were sixty musicians in the orchestra at the beginning of their first season. The first concert included music by Wagner, Tchaikovsky, Haydn, and Liszt. There were thirteen concerts in the 1911–1912 season, five of which were popular music.

In 1915, Alfred Hertz succeeded Hadley. Hertz helped to refine the orchestra and arranged for the Victor Talking Machine Company to record it at their new studio in Oakland in early 1925. Hertz also led the orchestra during a number of radio broadcasts, including on The Standard Hour, a weekly concert series sponsored by Standard Oil of California. The series began in 1926 when the orchestra faced bankruptcy; Standard Oil of California paid the orchestra's debts and in return was given broadcast rights to that year's concert series. The first broadcast aired on the NBC Pacific Network, on October 24, 1926. and the broadcasts continued for more than 30 years.

=== Pierre Monteux ===
After Hertz's retirement in 1930, two conductors, Basil Cameron and Issay Dobrowen, jointly headed the orchestra. During the Great Depression, the symphony's existence was threatened by bankruptcy and the 1934–35 season was cancelled; the people of San Francisco passed a bond measure to provide public financing and ensure the organization's continued existence. Pierre Monteux (1875–1964) was subsequently hired to restore the orchestra. Monteux succeeded to the point where NBC began broadcasting some of its concerts and RCA Victor offered the orchestra a new recording contract in 1941. In 1949, Monteux invited Arthur Fiedler to lead summer "pops" concerts in the Civic Auditorium. Fiedler also conducted the orchestra at free concerts in Sigmund Stern Grove in San Francisco and the Frost Amphitheater at Stanford University. Fiedler's relationship with the orchestra continued until the mid-1970s.

When Monteux left the orchestra in 1952, various conductors led the orchestra, including Leopold Stokowski, Georg Solti, Erich Leinsdorf, Karl Münchinger, George Szell, Bruno Walter, Ferenc Fricsay, and William Steinberg. Stokowski made a series of RCA Victor recordings with the orchestra in 1952 and 1953.

=== Enrique Jordá ===
In 1954, the board hired Enrique Jordá as music director. Surviving eyewitness and newspaper accounts describe him as having youthful enthusiasm, energy, and charm. Jordá sometimes conducted so vigorously that his baton flew from his hand. As the years passed, Jordá reportedly failed to maintain discipline or provide sufficient leadership, resulting in inadequate rehearsal of the orchestra George Szell (1897–1970), the longtime music director of the Cleveland Orchestra, guest-conducted the orchestra in 1962 and was so dismayed by the lack of discipline that he publicly condemned Jordá and even chastised San Francisco Chronicle music critic Alfred Frankenstein for commending Jordá and the orchestra. Szell's comments, along with growing dissatisfaction among musicians and the public, led the symphony board to dismiss Jordá.

=== Josef Krips ===
In the fall of 1963, Josef Krips (1902–1974) became music director. He quickly became known as a benevolent autocrat, and would not tolerate sloppy playing. He soon began to refine the performance of the musicians, particularly of the standard German-Austrian repertoire. One of his innovations was an annual tradition on New Year's Eve, "A Night in Old Vienna", which was devoted to music of Johann Strauss and other Viennese masters of the nineteenth century. Similar concerts continued into the 2000s, though the format has changed in recent years. Krips would not make recordings with the orchestra, insisting they weren't ready. He did agree to allow KKHI to broadcast some of the Friday evening concerts. He also paved the way for his successor when he invited Seiji Ozawa to guest conduct the orchestra; Ozawa impressed critics and audiences with his fiery Bernstein-like conducting, particularly in the performances of the Mussorgsky-Ravel Pictures at an Exhibition, the Tchaikovsky Fourth Symphony, and Symphonie Fantastique by Hector Berlioz. Krips retired at the end of the 1969–70 season and only returned once, to guest conduct the orchestra in Stern Grove, before his death in 1974.

=== Seiji Ozawa ===
Seiji Ozawa guest appearances had generated interest before he became the symphony's director in 1970. Concerts were frequently sold out. He greatly improved the quality of the orchestra's performances and convinced Deutsche Grammophon (DG) to record the orchestra in 1972. A special concert series devoted to Romeo and Juliet, as interpreted by Hector Berlioz, Peter Tchaikovsky, and Sergei Prokofiev and Leonard Bernstein's symphonic dances from West Side Story, inspired DG to record the same music with Ozawa. He introduced a number of innovations, including presenting partially staged versions of La vida breve by Manuel de Falla and Beatrice and Benedict by Berlioz. He had dancers on the stage for some modern ballets performed by the orchestra. For a few seasons Ozawa used local university choruses when needed, but later formed a San Francisco Symphony Chorus to ensure consistent singing. Ozawa purchased a home in San Francisco, planning to stay for many years. However, he agreed to become music director of the Boston Symphony Orchestra and for a time simultaneously directed both orchestras. After leaving San Francisco, Ozawa has returned twice as guest conductor.

=== Edo de Waart ===
Edo de Waart succeeded Ozawa in 1977. Though considered to be not as flamboyant as Ozawa, de Waart maintained the orchestra's high standards, leading to additional recordings, including its first digital sessions. He conducted the orchestra's first performances in the newly constructed Louise M. Davies Symphony Hall in September 1980, including the nationally televised gala. At this time the regular season was extended, beginning in September and lasting until May. This was possible because San Francisco now had two major classical venues, Davies Hall and the War Memorial Opera House. Consequently, musicians could choose to play in the symphony, or the opera and ballet. A large Fratelli Ruffatti concert organ featuring five manuals, 147 registers and 9235 pipes, was added to the new hall. This organ was used in the orchestra's performance of the recording of Saint-Saëns' third symphony with Michael Murray as soloist. Philips also taped Joseph Jongen's Symphonie Concertante and César Franck's Fantaisie in A. A highlight of de Waart's final season, 1984–85, was four sold-out performances of Mahler's eighth symphony, incorporating the Symphony Chorus, the Masterworks Chorale, the San Francisco Boys Chorus, and the San Francisco Girls Chorus.

=== Herbert Blomstedt ===
Herbert Blomstedt became music director as of the 1985–1986 season. He had been offered the position immediately after guest conducting for two weeks in 1984, while he was music director of Staatskapelle Dresden. He emphasized precision and confidence, and worked to develop sensitivity, warmth and feeling in the orchestra's performances. The orchestra began its annual tours of Europe and Asia under Blomstedt, and resumed syndicated weekly radio broadcasts. He recognized the continuing shortcomings of Davies Symphony Hall's acoustics, helping push for a major renovation, completed in 1992, contributing a substantial amount of money to the cause. He has remained conductor laureate of the orchestra, conducting several weeks of concerts each year.

=== Michael Tilson Thomas ===
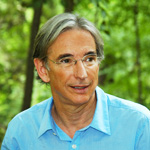
Michael Tilson Thomas

Michael Tilson Thomas (known colloquially as "MTT") became music director in 1995. Thomas had guest-conducted the orchestra as far back as 1974, and already had a relationship with the musicians. Like Ozawa, Thomas ensured that the orchestra played more American music and this carried through to its recordings, for RCA/BMG and its own label SFS Media. Thomas focused on Russian music, particularly Stravinsky, as well as a prominent Mahler cycle. He recruited London Symphony Orchestra leader Alexander Barantschik to become SFS concertmaster. During his leadership, the orchestra achieved financial and artistic stability. Thomas became the longest-serving music director in the orchestra's history.

Thomas concluded his tenure as its music director at the close of the 2019–2020 season and subsequently took the title of music director laureate. Thomas was inducted into the California Hall of Fame in 2017. Thomas conducted his final concerts with the orchestra in April 2025, and retained the title of music director laureate of the orchestra until his death in April 2026.

=== Esa-Pekka Salonen ===
Esa-Pekka Salonen guest-conducted the orchestra in 2004, 2012, and 2015. In December 2018, the orchestra announced the appointment of Salonen as its next music director, effective for the 2020–2021 season, with an initial contract of 5 seasons. In March 2024, Salonen announced that he was to stand down from the orchestra in 2025, at the expiration of his initial contract, stating that "I do not share the same goals for the future of the institution as the Board of Governors does."

=== Elim Chan ===
In January 2023, Elim Chan first guest-conducted the orchestra. She returned for additional guest-conducting appearances in October 2023 and in March 2025. In May 2026, the San Francisco Symphony announced the appointment of Chan as its 13th music director, effective with the 2027–2028 season, with an initial contract of six years. She took the title of music director-designate with immediate effect. Chan is the first female conductor to be named music director of the San Francisco Symphony Orchestra.

== Radio broadcasts and tours ==
The San Francisco Symphony was the first to feature symphonic radio broadcasts in 1926, and in 2003 the symphony was heard in syndicated radio broadcasts on over 300 radio stations. There were regular live, stereo broadcasts for many years on KKHI in San Francisco featuring music directors Josef Krips and Seiji Ozawa, including the first live transatlantic stereo satellite broadcast in 1973, originating in Paris.

The orchestra has regularly toured the United States, Europe and Asia. Its first tour was from March 16 – May 10, 1947, when Pierre Monteux conducted the musicians in 57 concerts in 53 American cities. Josef Krips led them on a Japanese tour in 1968, in which they gave 12 concerts in 7 cities. The May 15 – June 17, 1973, tour saw then-music director Seiji Ozawa and Niklaus Wyss conduct the orchestra in 30 concerts in 19 cities in Europe and the Soviet Union. They returned to Japan from June 4–19, 1975, with Ozawa and Wyss and played 12 concerts in 11 cities. Edo de Waart and David Ramadanoff led an American tour from October 20 – November 2, 1980, giving 10 concerts in 7 cities. There was another American tour from October 27 – November 12, 1983, again led by Edo de Waart, with 13 concerts in 11 cities. Its tours with Michael Tilson Thomas included an East Coast tour in April 2016 which included performances in Carnegie Hall, The Kennedy Center, and the New Jersey Performing Arts Center. In November 2016, the San Francisco Symphony, together with Michael Tilson Thomas, embarked on its fourth tour of Asia with performances in Seoul, South Korea; Tainan, Taiwan; Taipei, Taiwan; Shanghai, China; Beijing, China; Osaka, Japan; and Tokyo, Japan.

In 2006, the San Francisco Symphony launched Keeping Score – MTT on Music, a series of projects comprising audio-visual performances for DVD and broadcast on PBS's Great Performances, multimedia websites, and educational programs for schools.

== Guests ==
Throughout its history, the San Francisco Symphony has featured many notable composers as guest conductors. In 1915, Saint-Saëns (1835–1921) conducted the orchestra at the Panama-Pacific International Exposition held that year in San Francisco's Marina District. In 1928, Maurice Ravel conducted some of his music including La Valse and Rapsodie espagnole. In 1937, George Gershwin (1898–1937) conducted a suite from his opera Porgy and Bess, then was soloist in his Concerto in F and Rhapsody in Blue with Pierre Monteux conducting. Igor Stravinsky (1882–1971) was a regular guest conductor, appearing periodically from 1937 until 1967. Aaron Copland (1900–1990) conducted the orchestra in 1966. Other composers who have led the orchestra include Ernst von Dohnányi in 1927, Ottorino Respighi in 1929, Arnold Schoenberg in 1945, Darius Milhaud in 1949, Manuel Rosenthal in 1950, Leon Kirchner in 1960, Jean Martinon in 1970, Witold Lutoslawski in 1986 and Howard Hanson. John Adams, composer-in-residence from 1979 to 1985, has also conducted his own works with the orchestra.

== Concert halls ==
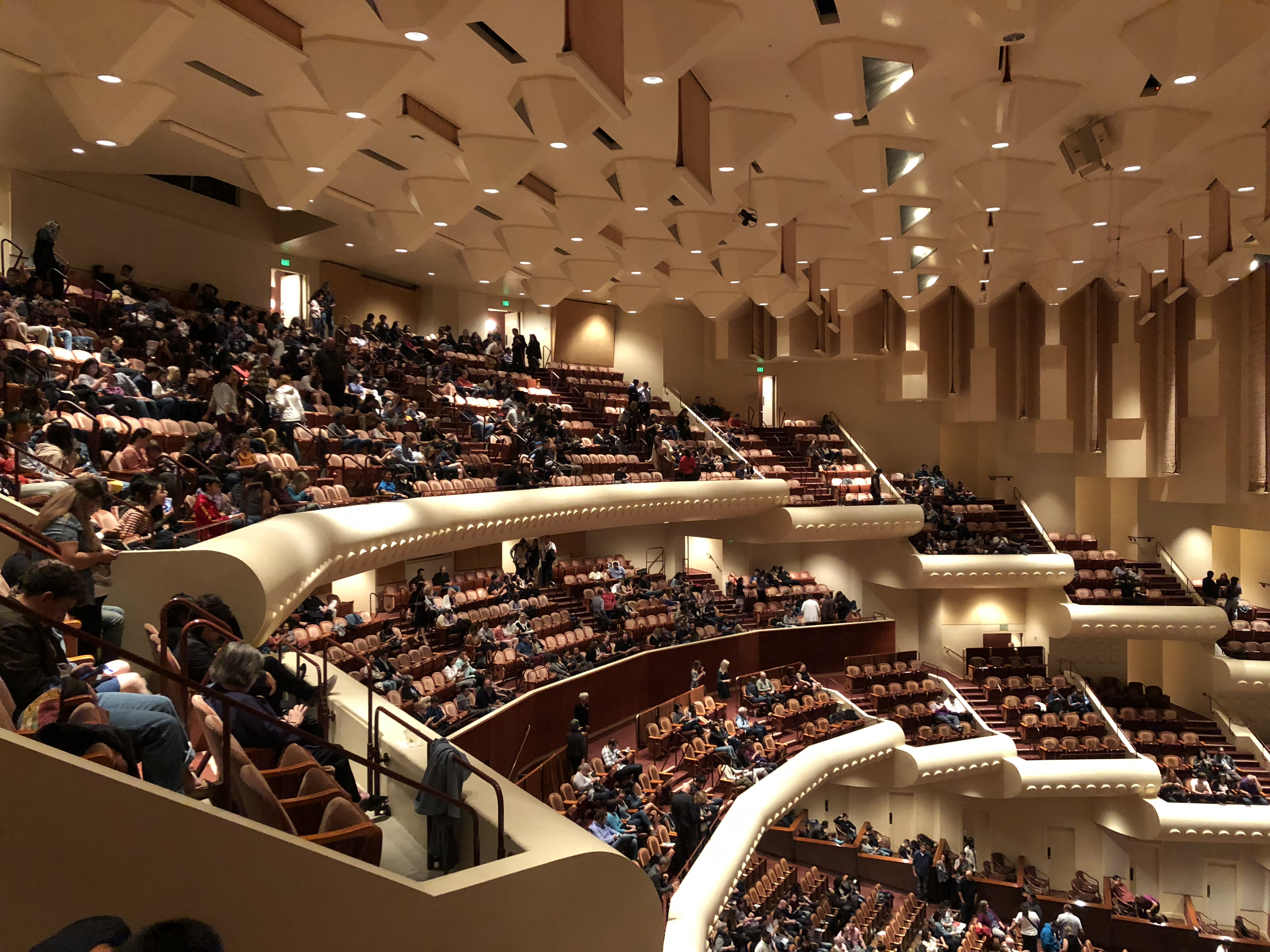
Louise M. Davies Symphony Hall

The San Francisco Symphony gave its first performance on Friday, December 8, 1911, in the Cort Theater at 64 Ellis Street. The symphony stayed at the Cort Theater when it was renamed the Curran Theatre in 1918 (not to be confused with the present day Curran Theater at 445 Geary Street, which wasn't built until 1922). The symphony then moved to the Tivoli Theater at 75 Eddy Street for the 1921–22 season, then moved to the newly constructed Curran Theater in 1922 and stayed until 1931, then back to the Tivoli Theater from 1931 to 1932. On November 11, 1932, the symphony moved to the new War Memorial Opera House at 301 Van Ness Avenue, where most of their concerts were given until June 1980. The pops concerts were usually presented at the Civic Auditorium. The final concert in the opera house, a Beethoven program conducted by Leonard Slatkin, was in June 1980. The orchestra now plays almost exclusively in Louise M. Davies Symphony Hall at Grove Street and Van Ness Avenue, which opened in September 1980 with a gala concert conducted by Edo de Waart, televised live on PBS and hosted by violinist/conductor Yehudi Menuhin. Davies Symphony Hall underwent extensive remodeling in the 1990s to correct a number of acoustical problems. The hall is also home to the second largest concert hall organ in North America, a Fratelli Ruffatti 5–147.

== Recordings ==
The orchestra has a long history of recordings, most notably those made with Pierre Monteux for RCA Victor, Herbert Blomstedt for Decca, and Michael Tilson Thomas for RCA Victor and the orchestra's own label, SFS Media.

The first recording, of Auber's overture to Fra Diavolo, was made on January 19, 1925. The early recordings, for the Victor Talking Machine Company, included music by Auber and Richard Wagner, conducted by Alfred Hertz. Hertz also conducted the orchestra's first electrical recordings for Victor in mid 1925. These recordings were produced by Victor's Oakland plant, which had opened in 1924. The 1927 recordings were made on the stage of San Francisco's Columbia Theater, now known as the American Conservatory Theater. In 1928, the orchestra made a series of recordings at Oakland's Scottish Rite Temple on Madison Avenue near Lake Merritt, now the Islamic Cultural Center of Northern California. One early complete set was of the ballet music from Le Cid by Jules Massenet. During the 1925–30 recordings, Hertz conducted music by Ludwig van Beethoven, Johannes Brahms, Léo Delibes, Alexander Glazunov, Charles Gounod, Fritz Kreisler, Franz Liszt, Alexandre Luigini, Felix Mendelssohn, Moritz Moszkowski, Nikolai Rimsky-Korsakov, Franz Schubert and Carl Maria von Weber. All of these recordings were issued only on 78 rpm discs and are prized by collectors, although restored versions are now available from France's Pristine Audio.

Monteux's recordings were made for RCA Victor in the War Memorial Opera House from 1941 to 1952, at first piping the microphone feed from San Francisco to Los Angeles and then in the later 1940s on magnetic tape; there was also a stereo session for RCA Victor with Monteux in January 1960. Monteux's first released album with the orchestra was of the Symphony in D Minor by César Franck (the first recorded was Maurice Ravel's La Valse); his last was of Siegfried Idyll by Richard Wagner and Death and Transfiguration by Richard Strauss. Some of the recordings have been re-released on LPs and compact discs, as well as internationally via the Pierre Monteux Edition from RCA. A substantial selection of Monteux's live broadcasts on The Standard Hour have been released by the Music & Arts label.

Enrique Jordá made several stereo recordings for RCA in 1957 and 1958, and an album for CRI in 1962. Jorda's recording of Rachmaninoff's second piano concerto, with pianist Alexander Brailowsky was in the catalogue for many years. The recording of Manuel de Falla's "Nights in the Gardens of Spain" with pianist Arthur Rubinstein has remained available.

Commercial recordings resumed in June 1972 with Seiji Ozawa for Deutsche Grammophon in the Flint Center at De Anza College in Cupertino, California. In May 1975 Ozawa recorded Beethoven's Symphony No. 3 in E-flat and Dvořák's Carnival Overture and Symphony No. 9 in E Minor for Philips. For Deutsche Grammophon, Ozawa and the orchestra recorded William Russo's "Three Pieces for Blues Band and Symphony Orchestra" with the Siegel-Schwall Blues Band, and Bernstein's Orchestral Dances from West Side Story. These recordings featured solo performances from hornist David Krehbiel, concertmaster Stuart Canin, trumpeter Don Reinberg, and violist Detlev Olshausen. Recordings of the SFS under the direction of Edo de Waart, including digital recordings made in Davies Symphony Hall, were released by Philips and Nonesuch. One of de Waart's sets of digital recordings was devoted to the four piano concertos of Sergei Rachmaninoff, featuring pianist Zoltán Kocsis. A number of works by American composer John Adams were premiered and recorded by the SFS under de Waart's leadership, and Harmonium was also released with Adams conducting.

Soon after the arrival of Herbert Blomstedt, the SFS signed contracts with the British label Decca resulting in 29 CDs released in the U.S. under the London label. Several of the recordings won international awards. Among their recording projects were the complete symphonies of Nielsen and Sibelius, choral works of Brahms, and orchestral works of Richard Strauss and Hindemith. The recordings helped to build the orchestra's worldwide reputation as one of the best in the United States.

In 1999, the Symphony hit a new commercial high on the album S&M with heavy metal band Metallica. The album reached number two on the Billboard 200, selling 2.5 million units and earning platinum status five times over. The track "No Leaf Clover" was number one on the Mainstream Rock Charts, 18 on Modern Rock Charts and 74 on the Billboard Hot 100. The version of "The Call of Ktulu" featured on the album won the Grammy Award for Best Rock Instrumental Performance.

The orchestra returned to RCA Victor when Michael Tilson Thomas became music director. Its first recording of the new contract was extended excerpts from Prokofiev's Romeo and Juliet. There were special tributes to three American composers, Charles Ives, Aaron Copland, and George Gershwin, on the occasion of what would have been his 100th birthday. With the RCA label decision to cease from producing new classical recordings, the SFS created its own label, SFS Media, and continued producing its Mahler recording cycle, which was completed in the fall of 2010.

Recorded live in concert and engineered at Davies Symphony Hall, the audio recordings are released on hybrid SACD and in high-quality digital formats. SFS Media has garnered eight Grammy awards, the most current for its recording of John Adams’ Harmonielehre and Short Ride in a Fast Machine and seven for its recordings of MTT and the SFS performing all nine of Gustav Mahler's symphonies, the Adagio from the unfinished Tenth Symphony, and his songs for voice, chorus and orchestra. With a slate of new recordings and releases of music by Harrison, Cowell, Varèse, Beethoven, Ives, and Copland, the orchestra's recordings continue to reflect the artistic identity of the San Francisco Symphony's programming.

In 2014, Michael Tilson Thomas and the San Francisco Symphony released a live recording on the SFS Media label of the first-ever concert performances of Leonard Bernstein’s complete score for the musical West Side Story featuring a Broadway cast including Cheyenne Jackson (Tony), Alexandra Silber (Maria), and the San Francisco Symphony Chorus. The two-disc set includes a 100-page booklet featuring a new interview with MTT, notes from Rita Moreno and Jamie Bernstein, as well as a West Side Story historical timeline, archival photographs, complete lyrics, and rehearsal and performance photos from the June 2013 live performances at Davies Symphony Hall. The album was nominated for a Grammy Award in the category of Best Musical Theater Album.

In November 2014 on their SFS Media label, Michael Tilson Thomas and the San Francisco Symphony released Masterpieces in Miniature, a collection of short orchestral works by Mahler, Debussy, Schubert, Dvořák, Sibelius, Ives, and featuring Pianist Yuja Wang in Litolff’s Scherzo from Concerto symphonique No. 4. The recording was released in conjunction with the celebration of MTT's 20th season as music director of the SF Symphony. In May 2015, MTT and the SFS released a live recording of Tchaikovsky’s Symphony No. 5 and Romeo and Juliet Fantasy-Overture, followed by another release in August 2015 – a live audio recording of Absolute Jest and Grand Pianola Music by John Adams. The album contains the first-ever recording of Absolute Jest, originally commissioned by the SF Symphony and premiered in 2012 during the orchestra's American Mavericks festival.

In November 2015, SFS Media released "Beethoven: Piano Concerto No. 3 & Mass in C." In March 2016, it released its album of music by Mason Bates, "Works for Orchestra", which includes the first recordings of the SF Symphony-commissioned The B-Sides and Liquid Interface, plus the first CD release of Alternative Energy. In October of the same year, the label released "Debussy: Images, Jeux & La plus que lente", which was subsequently nominated for a 2018 Grammy award in the category of Best Orchestral Performance. In 2017, SFS Media released two albums: "Berg: Three Pieces for Orchestra", the label's first digital-only album, and "Schumann: Symphonies Nos. 1–4".

== Music directors ==
- Henry Hadley (1911–1915)
- Alfred Hertz (1915–1930)
- Basil Cameron and Issay Dobrowen (1930–1934)
- Pierre Monteux (1935–1952)
- Enrique Jordá (1954–1963)
- Josef Krips (1963–1970)
- Seiji Ozawa (1970–1977)
- Edo de Waart (1977–1985)
- Herbert Blomstedt (1985–1995)
- Michael Tilson Thomas (1995–2020)
- Esa-Pekka Salonen (2020–2025)
- Elim Chan (designate, effective 2027)

== Conductors laureate ==
- Herbert Blomstedt
- Michael Tilson Thomas

== Honors and awards ==
The SFS has won 19 awards from the American Society of Composers, Authors and Publishers for programming of new music and commitment to American music. In 2001, the San Francisco Symphony gave the world premiere of Henry Brant's Ice Field, which later won that year's Pulitzer Prize for Music.

Belgium

Caecilia Prize

- 1985 Nielsen: Symphony No. 4; Symphony No. 5

France

Grand Prix du Disque

- 1985 Nielsen: Symphony No. 4; Symphony No. 5

Ordre des Arts et des Lettres

- Michael Tilson Thomas

Germany

Preis der Deutschen Schallplattenkritik

- 1995 Mahler: Symphony No. 2

Japan

Japan Record Academy Award

- 1989 Grieg: Peer Gynt

United Kingdom

Gramophone Award – Best Orchestral

- 1991 Nielsen: Symphony No. 2; Symphony No. 3

United States

Emmy Award for Outstanding Classical Music-Dance Program

- 2002 Sweeney Todd: The Demon Barber Of Fleet Street

Grammy Award for Best Classical Album

- 2010 Mahler: Symphony No. 8 & Adagio from Symphony No. 10
- 2006 Mahler: Symphony No. 7
- 2004 Mahler: Symphony No. 3; Kindertotenlieder
- 2000 Stravinsky: The Firebird; The Rite of Spring; Perséphone

Grammy Award for Best Choral Performance

- 2010 Mahler: Symphony No. 8 & Adagio from Symphony No. 10
- 1996 Brahms: Ein deutsches Requiem (1995)
- 1992 Orff: Carmina Burana

Grammy Award for Best Engineered Album, Classical

- 2010 Mahler: Symphony No. 8 & Adagio from Symphony No. 10
- 2000 Stravinsky: The Firebird; The Rite of Spring; Perséphone
- 1996 Bartók: Concerto for Orchestra; Kossuth

Grammy Award for Best Orchestral Performance

- 2013 John Adams: Harmonielehre & Short Ride in a Fast Machine
- 2006 Mahler: Symphony No. 7
- 2003 Mahler: Symphony No. 6
- 2000 Stravinsky: The Firebird; The Rite of Spring; Perséphone
- 1996 Prokofiev: Romeo & Juliet

Grammy Award for Best Rock Instrumental Performance

- 2001 "The Call of Ktulu" with Metallica

Peabody Award

- 2007 The MTT Files

== Pops Orchestra ==
When the San Francisco Symphony Orchestra was founded in 1911, its first music director, Henry Hadley, began the tradition of "pops" concerts, devoted to lighter classics and special arrangements of music from operettas, musicals, and popular tunes. With the completion of the Civic Auditorium in 1915, most of the "pops" concerts were held in that 10,000-seat auditorium. Eventually, municipal taxes helped to keep ticket prices very affordable.

Arthur Fiedler of the Boston Pops Orchestra was invited by music director Pierre Monteux to lead the Pops Orchestra, which Fiedler did from 1951 to 1978. Besides the regular concerts in the Civic Auditorium, Fiedler led annual performances at Sigmund Stern Grove, as well as occasional performances at Stanford University's Frost Amphitheater and Oakland's Paramount Theatre.

While the SF Symphony does not have a specific pops orchestra today, they present pops genre programming periodically throughout the year, particularly in the summer months, with most concerts occurring at Davies Symphony Hall. They also present an annual concert of July 4 at the Shoreline Amphitheatre.

== See also ==
- San Francisco Composers Chamber Orchestra

== Sources ==
- Schneider, David (1983). The San Francisco Symphony: Music, Maestros, and Musicians. Novato, California: Presidio Press. ISBN 978-0-89141-181-9.
