= Pristine Audio =

British record label

Pristine Audio was founded in 2002 by Andrew Rose, then a BBC Radio sound engineer, as an audio transfer and restoration business.

Following its relocation from the United Kingdom to France in 2004, the company began to concentrate on the restoration and remastering of historic classical music recordings. In February 2005 Pristine Audio Direct was launched online, later to become PristineClassical.com, offering downloads of classical music both from Pristine's own remastered recordings and from other record companies.

Pristine Audio came to unexpected global attention during the Joyce Hatto scandal in February 2007, after being asked to investigate and verify suspected fraudulent Hatto recordings by Gramophone magazine.
