= Harvest of Stars =

Concert music series

James Melton in a 1940s studio portrait.

Harvest of Stars is a concert music series, produced and directed by Glen Heisch and starring James Melton. Sponsored by International Harvester, the program was broadcast on NBC and CBS from 1945 to 1950.

Raymond Massey was the host when the show began October 7, 1945, on Sunday afternoons from 2:30pm to 3:00pm, offering opera selections along with standards and show tunes under the direction of Howard Barlow. Frank Black was the musical director in the 1947 series. He replaced Barlow on December 1, 1946. On April 7, 1948, the show moved to Wednesday evenings at 9:30pm. Victor Young took over as musical director on January 5, 1949.

Although usually emanating from New York, Harvest of Stars also toured for sell-out shows in major cities from San Francisco to Memphis. Guests included Bob Burns (doing a bazooka solo), Alfred Drake. Burl Ives. Dorothy Kirsten, Lauritz Melchior. Robert Merrill. Jan Peerce, Jane Powell, the Revelers (their first reunion since 1938), Lanny Ross, Rise Stevens, Alec Templeton, and Genevieve Rowe.

Local International Harvester dealers ran tie-in ads with the radio series. For example, on April 20, 1949, the Orscheln Bros. dealership in Moberly, Missouri, advertised the company's Farmall tractor in the Moberly Monitor-Index and Democrat with a box at the bottom of the ad:

Listen!
Sunday afternoon
Listen!
Harvest of Stars starring James Melton will be heard on the NBC network Sunday afternoons at 4:30pm. Listen to it over Stations WDAF, Kansas City or KSD, St. Louis.

The final run of the program began April 3, 1949, on Sundays at 5:30pm, and the series concluded September 5, 1950.
