= Carmen Dragon =

American conductor, composer, and arranger

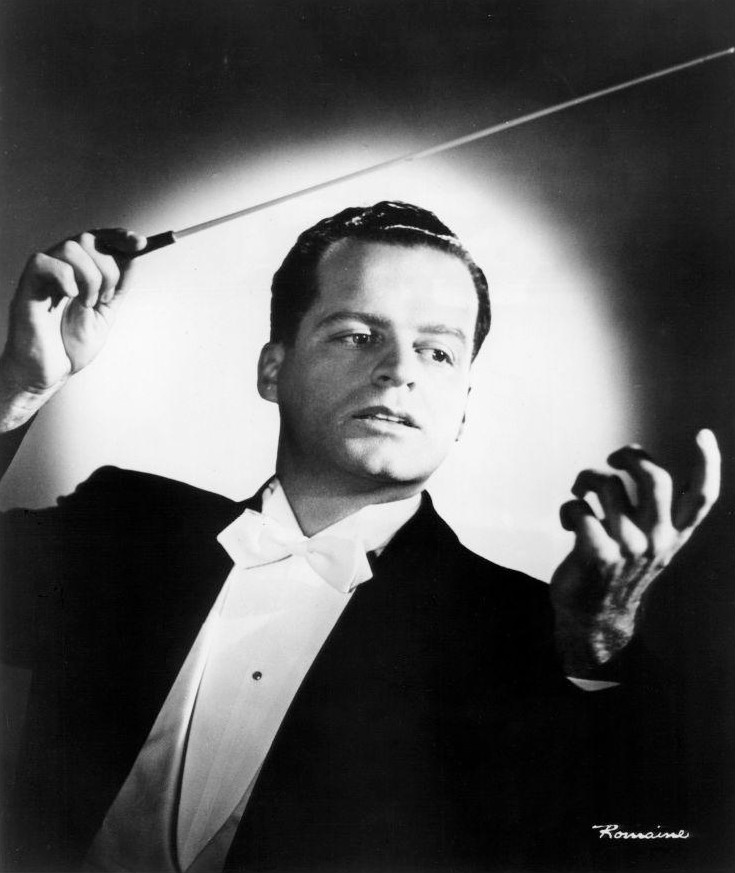
- Dragon in 1953
- Born: July 28, 1914; Antioch, California, U.S.
- Died: March 28, 1984 (aged 69); Santa Monica, California, U.S.
- Education: San Jose State University
- Occupations: Conductor, composer, and arranger

Carmen Dragon (July 28, 1914 – March 28, 1984) was an American conductor, composer, and arranger who in addition to live performances and recording, worked in radio, film, and television.

== Early years ==
Dragon was born in Antioch, California, the son of Rose and Frank Dragon, who were Italian immigrants. He attended Antioch High School and, while a student there, composed a song for the school. Forward, Antioch! was performed between acts of a school play on February 28, 1930. (A newspaper article erroneously identified the composer as "a high school girl, Carmen Dragon".)

== Film ==
He was very active in pop music conducting and composed scores for several films, including At Gunpoint (1955), Invasion of the Body Snatchers (1956), Night into Morning (1951), and Kiss Tomorrow Good-bye (1950).

With Morris Stoloff, he shared the 1944 Oscar for the popular Gene Kelly/Rita Hayworth musical Cover Girl, which featured songs by Jerome Kern and Ira Gershwin.

He made a popular orchestral arrangement of "America the Beautiful" and also re-arranged it for symphonic band. In his obituary published March 29, 1984, the New York Times noted: "In 1964 he won an Emmy for producing the Glendale Symphony Orchestra Christmas Special on NBC." He played himself in the 1979 film The In-Laws as the conductor of the fictitious Paramus Philharmonic Orchestra.

== Radio ==
Dragon conducted the Hollywood Bowl Symphony Orchestra, and they performed on The Standard School Broadcast, broadcast on NBC radio in the western U.S. for elementary schools from 1928 through the 1970s. The show was sponsored by the Standard Oil Company of California (now the Chevron Corporation), but other than the name there were no commercials. The program featured a high quality introduction to classical music for young people growing up in the 1940s and early 1950s.

In the summer of 1947, Dragon and Frances Langford had a program on NBC. Langford sang, accompanied by Dragon and his 25-piece orchestra. The show began June 5 and ran for 13 weeks as a summer replacement for George Burns and Gracie Allen's program.

Dragon also hosted a regular classical music radio show broadcast on the Armed Forces Radio Network well into the 1980s.

Dragon's concert band arrangement of America the Beautiful is played by bands across the country in concerts of patriotic music.

== Personal appearances ==
By May 1935, Dragon had his own orchestra. A Santa Cruz, California, newspaper reported about the San Jose State freshman dance, "The dancers will travel over the world with the orchestra of Carmen Dragon furnishing the appropriate music of each locality." A couple of months later, a Fresno, California, newspaper contained an advertisement promoting "Carmen Dragon, Ace Stanford Band, The Sensation of the Coast".

== Recording ==
Dragon made a series of popular light classical albums for Capitol Records during the 1950s with the Hollywood Bowl Orchestra. Some of these recordings have been reissued on compact disc.

== Recognition ==
Dragon has a star in the Radio section of the Hollywood Walk of Fame. Located at 6104 Hollywood Boulevard, it was dedicated September 7, 1989. Carmen Dragon Elementary School is named after the composer in Antioch, California.

== Personal life ==
Dragon's wife, Eloise (Rawitzer), sang on his Maxwell House series and Starlight Concert.

== Death ==
Carmen Dragon died of cancer, aged 69, in a Santa Monica, California hospital, on March 28, 1984.

== Children ==
- Son, Daryl Dragon (August 27, 1942 - January 2, 2019) of the 1970s pop music duo Captain & Tennille
- Daughter, Carmen E. Dragon (January 17, 1948 - July 11, 2010), classical harpist
- Son, Dennis Dragon (1947-2017), drummer for the surf band Surf Punks; also appeared in some live concerts with the Byrds shortly before they disbanded in 1973, also produced much of Captain & Tennille's music.
- Daughter, Kathryn Dragon Henn (November 8, 1951 - April, 2012), was the manager of her father's Orchestral Pops Rental Library
- Son, Douglas - a musician and singer
