= Annenberg =

Annenberg may refer to:

- Annenberg (surname)
- The Annenberg Foundation, formerly Annenberg/CPB, known for funding educational television and the Annenberg Channel
- Annenberg School for Communication (disambiguation)
  - The USC Annenberg School for Communication at the University of Southern California
  - The Annenberg School for Communication at the University of Pennsylvania
- The Wallis Annenberg Center for the Performing Arts, a community arts center in Beverly Hills, California
- The Annenberg Institute at Brown University
- The Annenberg Public Policy Center at the University of Pennsylvania
- The Annenberg Center for Health Sciences at Eisenhower Medical Center
- The Annenberg Library at Pine Manor College
- Annenberg Hall, the freshman dining hall at Harvard College, part of Memorial Hall
- Annenberg: A Biography of Power, a 1970 non-fiction book by Gaeton Fonzi
