= Lauren Bon =

American artist (born 1962)

- Born: Lauren Weingarten; 1962 (age 63–64); New Haven, Connecticut
- Education: Princeton University (BA); Massachusetts Institute of Technology (MArch)
- Occupations: Artist; Architect; Author; Community organizer
- Parent(s): Wallis Annenberg; Seth Weingarten
- Relatives: Moses Annenberg (great-grandfather); Walter Annenberg (grandfather); Janet Annenberg Hooker (aunt); Enid Haupt (aunt)

Lauren Bon (born 1962) is an environmental artist who works with architecture, performance, photography, sound, and farming, to create urban, public, and land art projects that she terms "devices of wonder" to galvanize social and political transformation. She is a 2025 Guggenheim Fellow in Fine Arts.

Based at her Metabolic Studio, between Chinatown and Lincoln Heights, Los Angeles, her signature works include: Not A Cornfield (2005-2006), which turned a 32-acre brownfield in the historic center of Los Angeles into a cornfield; Strawberry Flag (2009-2010), an aquaponic strawberry farm raised at an under-purposed property that was deeded to be a home for veterans in 1888; AgH20 (2007) a 240-mile work that aims at reconnecting Los Angeles with the elements that made it viable historically, both mined from the mountains of the Owens Valley. Her 2017 project, Bending the River Back into the City, utilizes Los Angeles’s first water commons and allows the currency of water to create social capital The Optics and Sonic Divisions of Metabolic Studio have exhibited and performed widely, including at MASS MoCA, MA (2016), George Eastman House, NY (2013), Nevada Art Museum, NV (2014), Hammer Museum, CA (2015), and BBC Radio 3, UK (2014). Bon’s solo exhibitions are Hand Held Objects, at the Santa Monica Museum of Art, CA (2003) and Bees and Meat, at ACE Gallery, CA (2007)

== Life and career ==
Lauren Bon's mother is Wallis Annenberg.

Bon holds a Master of Architecture from MIT and a BA from Princeton. She trained as a dancer at the Bat-Dor Dance Company, Tel Aviv (1979); the Martha Graham Dance Company, New York (1982); and the Lar Lubovitch Dance Company, New York (1985). From 1983 to 1985, she was the personal assistant of Isamu Noguchi, and she studied with artists Michael Singer (1988 and 1992); Elyn Zimmerman (1992); Magdalena Abakanowicz (1995). Helen and Newton Harrison are mentors and collaborators with Bon. She was divorced from Croatian artist Ranko Bon in 2003.

Bon is a 2025 Guggenheim Fellowship recipient, and she serves as a trustee of the Annenberg Foundation.

== Projects ==
=== Metabolic Studio (2005-present) ===
In 2005, Lauren Bon created Metabolic Studio. Derived from the Greek word for “change,” "metabolism” is the process that maintains life. In continuous cycles of creation and destruction, metabolism transforms nutrients into energy and form. The actions generated by Metabolic Studio are global in focus and reach: developing new tools for urban living and city planning; inventing novel social practices for political and environmental justice; and directing art practice to engage on the same scale as society’s capacity to destroy. Lauren Bon’s Metabolic Studio is a force for change, showing that another reality is possible and pointing the way new endeavors and practices in an age of economic and environmental scarcity. “ARTISTS NEED TO CREATE AT THE SAME SCALE THAT SOCIETY HAS THE CAPACITY TO DESTROY” proclaims a red neon sign on one wall of the Metabolic Studio in a warehouse on the edge of Chinatown in downtown Los Angeles.

=== Bending the River Back into the City (2012-present) ===
Lauren Bon’s current project is Bending the River Back into the City - a three-part sculpture consisting of a belowground tunnel that diverts water from the Los Angeles River, a seventy-two-foot waterwheel that lifts the water to publicly accessible bio-remediation gardens on the roof of the Metabolic Studio building, and a distribution network of users voluntarily receiving the newly clean water. In Bon’s vision, water that would otherwise bypass the city via the river (which is the catch for the rain) en route to the ocean (which is the catch for the river) will be captured for the benefit of Los Angeles’s arid landscape. This long-term project will clean LA River water to potable standards, and the water will become part of a distribution network that will deliver water to individuals, organizations, and institutions in Downtown LA. This phased project will begin to manifest in 2018 with the creation of an inflatable dam that will sit in the LA River—bending and driving a percentage of the river water through a diversion canal, and into a treatment facility. Bending the River Back into the City will eventually provide a waterwheel named LA Noria that reanimates the legacy of the waterwheels that drove water on and around the site in the 19th century.

"Right now, all of the water that’s going out to sea does not reenter the city for any beneficial use, and that’s a paradigm that needs to shift. That’s the primary goal of La Noria."

=== AgH2O (2008-present) ===
AgH20 a 240-mile work that aims at reconnecting Los Angeles with the elements that made it viable historically: silver and water, both mined from the mountains of the Owens Valley. This project connects these elements mined from the Owens Valley, silver and water, to the emergence of the film industry.

=== Strawberry Flag (2009-2010) ===
Strawberry Flag deployed an experimental aquaponic strawberry farm on an abandoned quadrangle of the West Los Angeles Veterans Administration (VA) using plants rescued from a local farm where they would otherwise have been plowed under after having fruited only once. Part therapy, part art installation and part fundraiser, the project created a raised strawberry field in the shape of an American flag. Veterans tend the strawberries, transplanted from abandoned fields, and sell preserves they make from second-harvest fruit.

=== Bldg 209: Garden Folly (Indexical Strawberry Flag) (2010) ===
Garden Folly was an installation at the exhibition EATLACMA that took place in 2010. EATLACMA was a year-long investigation into food, art, culture, and politics involving over fifty different artists working with gardening and food at the Los Angeles County Museum of Art. Bon’s project Garden Folly displayed a fusion of weakened strawberry plants and medical equipment such as intravenous lines, bags, and solution. The strawberry plants were rescuees from industrial farms and were supported and revitalized using the equipment. Garden Folly grew out of Bon’s much larger project Strawberry Flag.

=== Farmlab (2006-2009) ===
Farmlab was a collective studio practice. The practice produced a large archive of objects, and video’s from the performative actions. Farmlab’s signature projects involved properties in downtown Los Angeles on often mismanaged by political agencies or poorly effected by real estate market forces. Two thousand public salons were hosted by Farmlab during its three-year history. The conversations examined land use, politics, activism, environmental crisis, food equity, biological remediation of social and physical brownfields, or places not capable of supporting life.

=== Not a Cornfield (2005–2006) ===
Not a Cornfield was a living sculpture that consisted of a cornfield planted on a 32-acre piece of land in the centre of Los Angeles. This cornfield was stewarded by Lauren Bon and a large team of collaborators and volunteers for a full agricultural cycle in 2005 – 2006. The project was founded upon a desire to redeem a plot of once fertile and now depleted and derelict urban territory, as a symbol of renewal and hope. It was also designed to expedite the process of turning the site, owned by the State of California, into a State Historic Park.

“...we weren’t going to have a cornfield there forever. It was both a cornfield and not a cornfield,” she said. “It was a way of creating the potential for something else to occur there because the site had stalled in its process of becoming. And the cornfield was meant to galvanize it into that possibility again.” It’s not quite sculpture, either, though, she added, which “is often about its formal end being the subject of the work rather than consuming even its formal end into a greater notion of transformation.”

== Books ==
- Not a Cornfield: Essays + Timeline and Photographs + Maps, Ed. Janet Owen Driggs, Publisher: Not a Cornfield, LLC, 2007. ASIN: B01NASRVIX
- Under Spring, Ed. Jeremy Rosenberg, Heyday, 2014, ISBN 1597142956
- Preserving a Home for Veterans First Edition, Lauren Bon (Author), Janet Owen Driggs (Author), Terence Lyons (Author), Richard L. Fox (Author), Les Figues Press, 2012, ISBN 1934254304
- The Optics Division of the Metabolic Studio, Ed. Gregory J Harris, DePaul Art Museum, 2015, ISBN 0985096004
