= Annenberg (surname) =

Annenberg is a surname. Notable people with the surname include:

- Leonore Annenberg (1918–2009), former U.S. Chief of Protocol and former head of the Annenberg Foundation, widow of Walter Annenberg
- Moses Annenberg (1877–1942), American newspaper publisher
- Sandra Annenberg (born 1968), Brazilian television journalist
- Wallis Annenberg (1939–2025), American philanthropist
- Walter Annenberg (1908–2002), former U.S. Ambassador to Great Britain, billionaire publishing magnate, and philanthropist
