= Not A Cornfield =

Art project in Los Angeles, US

"Not A Cornfield" was a 2005 art project that transformed a 32-acre (130,000 m^{2}) industrial brownfield (today part of Los Angeles State Historic Park in the historic center of Los Angeles) into a cornfield for one agricultural cycle. The project took place north of Chinatown.

Lauren Bon created this work with funds from the Annenberg Foundation and considered the piece to be a sculpture. The installation cost $3 million and took place at the proposed site of Los Angeles State Historic Park, which had been referred to as "The Cornfield", because of the crops growing there prior to its industrial development. Fifteen hundred truck loads of soil were transported to the site and one million seeds were planted.

Some people complained that the project delayed the construction of the public park at that site, that the project was approved too quickly and that it was a waste of money.

There was a small edible garden in the cornfield, and the site was used for film screenings and drum circles. Group and school tours were available.

The corn was harvested in November and December 2005, allowed to dry and put on display in the nearby empty Capital Milling Co. building for six months. It was then used for the production of biodegradable containers. The project left behind fertile soil.

"Not A Cornfield" was located at 1201 North Spring Street, Los Angeles, California, 90012.

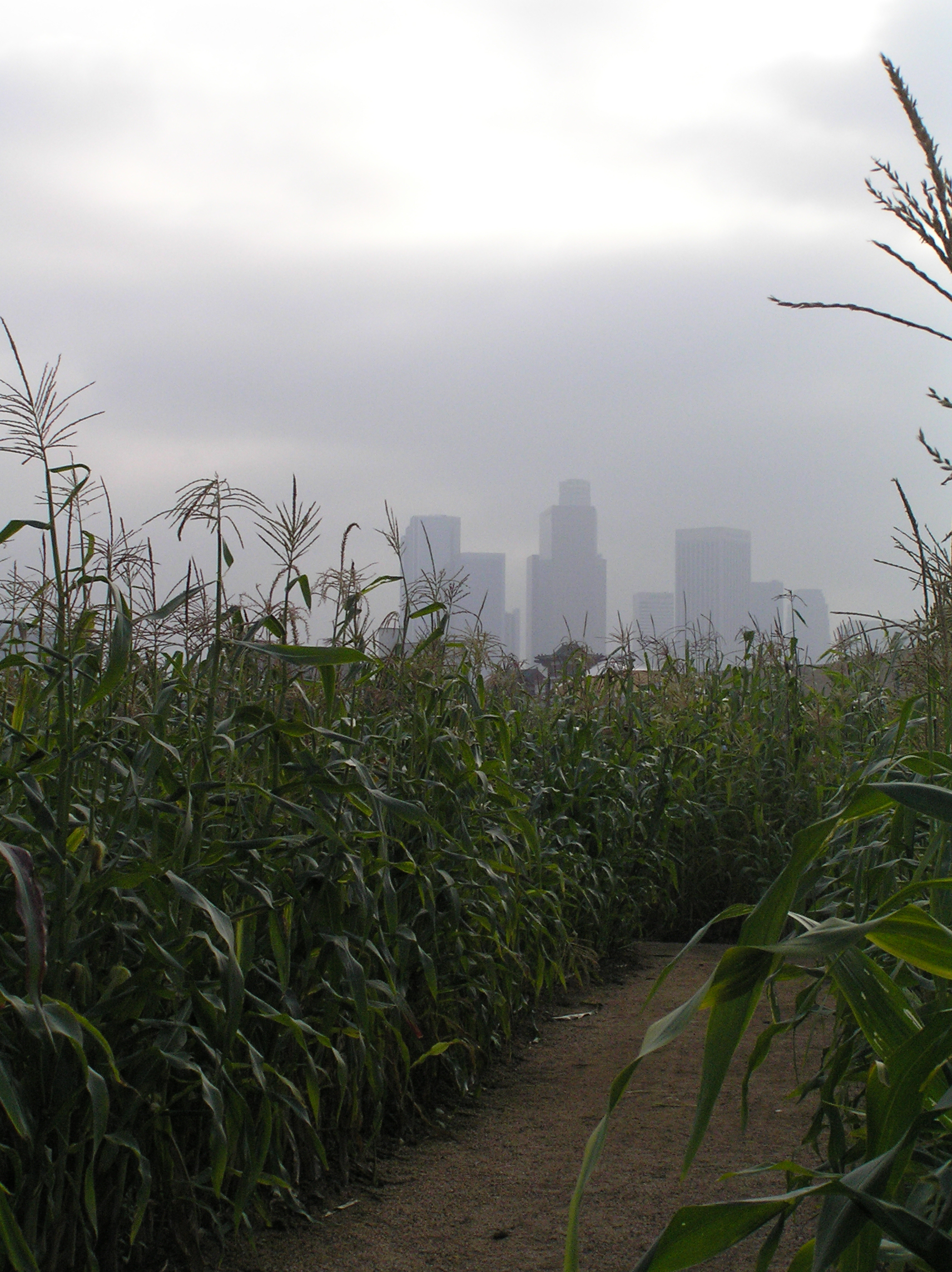
Before the Harvest, October 2005

== See also ==
- Land art
- Installation art
- Corn construction
- Guerrilla gardening
- Downtown Los Angeles
- Chinatown, Los Angeles, California
