= Sunnylands =

Estate-retreat in Rancho Mirage, California

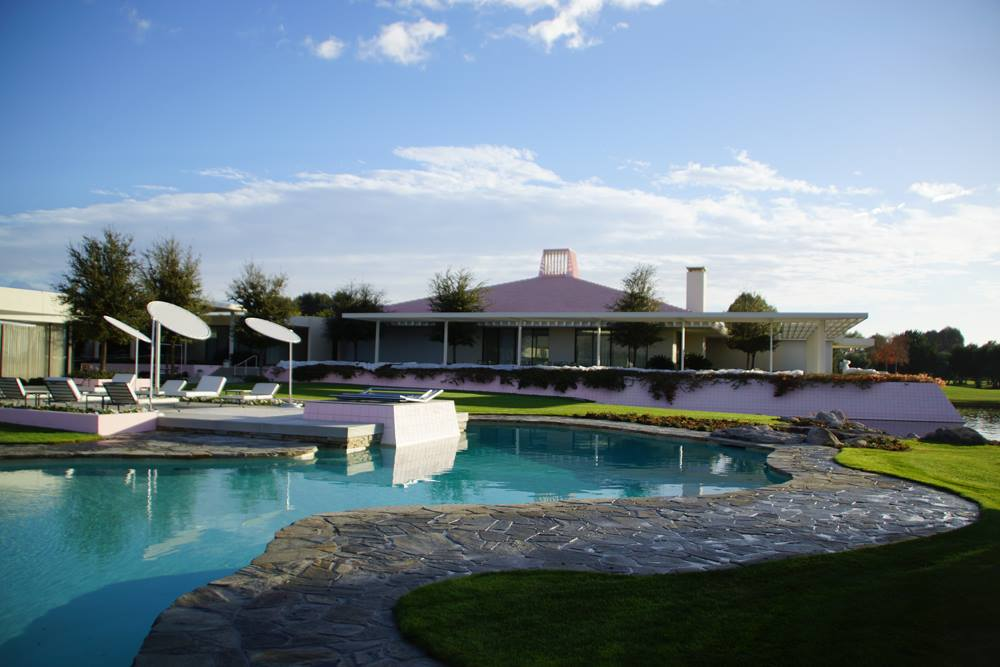
- Sunnylands, 2014
- Interactive map of the Sunnylands area

General information
- Status: Completed
- Location: 37977 Bob Hope Drive; Rancho Mirage, California; United States
- Coordinates: 33.7771°N 116.4107°W
- Construction started: 1963
- Completed: 1966
- Renovated: 2012
- Owner: Annenberg Foundation

Design and construction
- Architect: A. Quincy Jones

Renovating team
- Architect: Frederick B. Fisher
- Renovating firm: Frederick Fisher and Partners Architects
- Other designers: Office of James Burnett

Website
- sunnylands.org

Sunnylands is the former Annenberg Estate in Rancho Mirage, California. The 200-acre (0.81 km^{2}) property is currently run by The Annenberg Foundation Trust at Sunnylands, a not-for-profit organization. The property was owned by Walter and Leonore Annenberg until 2009 and had been used as a winter retreat by the couple beginning in 1966, when the house was completed. The city of Rancho Mirage considers the property to be “rich with historical significance” and declared Sunnylands a historic site in 1990. Located at Frank Sinatra and Bob Hope Drives, the property has been the vacation site of numerous celebrities and public officials. Sunnylands is sometimes referred to as the "Camp David of the West."

== History ==
Construction on the Sunnylands estate began in 1963. University of Southern California professor A. Quincy Jones designed the 25,000-square-foot midcentury modern house known for its pink roof. At one time, the house was the largest in Riverside County. Renowned interior designer and former screen actor William Haines and assistant Ted Graber were the interior designers on the project.

The property includes the main house, guest quarters, three guest cottages, a private 9-hole golf course, and 13 man-made lakes. When the Annenbergs were in residence, the main house hosted a significant art collection acquired by the couple, with about 50 works by Picasso, Van Gogh, Andrew Wyeth, and Monet. Many of their paintings were donated to the Metropolitan Museum of Art following Walter Annenberg's death in 2002.

The house is hidden from public view; a pink-brick wall surrounds the estate, as do hundreds of eucalyptus and olive trees and a thick belt of tamarisk trees.

== Famous guests ==
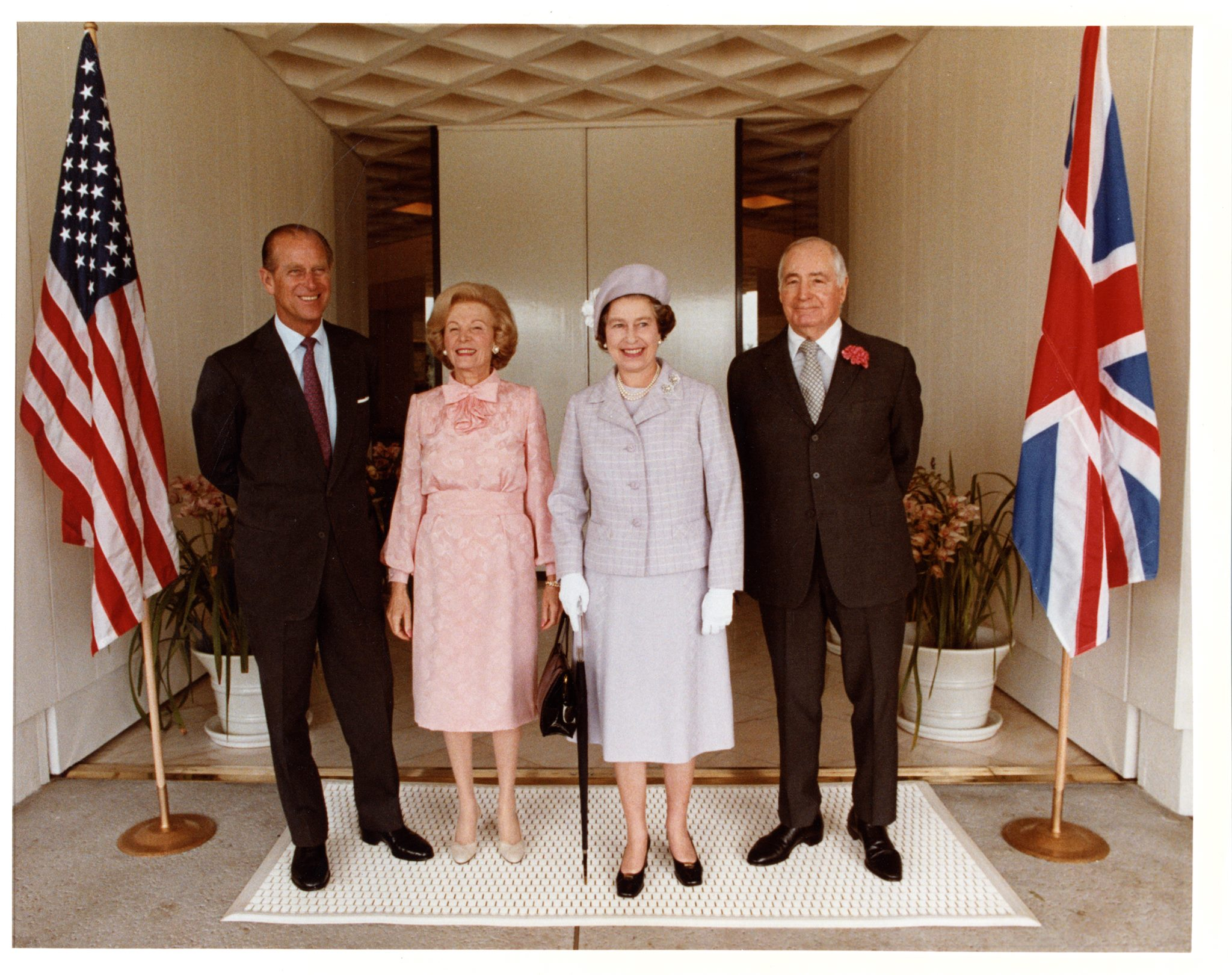
Queen Elizabeth II and Prince Philip visit Walter and Leonore Annenberg at Sunnylands, February 1983.

Walter and Leonore Annenberg frequently hosted both political leaders and famous entertainers at Sunnylands. During the Annenbergs' lifetime, eight U.S. presidents, including Eisenhower, Nixon, Ford, Reagan, Clinton, George H. W. Bush, George W. Bush and Barack Obama visited the estate. Following the Islamic Revolution in Iran in the late 1970s, the family of the Shah of Iran was invited to seek refuge at Sunnylands. Queen Elizabeth II and Prince Philip visited for lunch, and Prince Charles made occasional weekend visits. U.K. Prime Minister Margaret Thatcher was also a visitor.

Other notable people who have visited the property include Frank Sinatra (who was married there), Bob Hope, Fred Astaire, Gregory Peck, Ginger Rogers, Bing Crosby, Truman Capote, Mary Martin, and Sammy Davis Jr. First ladies such as Pat Nixon, Betty Ford, Mamie Dowd Eisenhower, Rosalynn Carter, Laura Bush, Nancy Reagan, and Hillary Clinton have also visited Sunnylands. Royal visitors include Charles, Prince of Wales, Prince Andrew, Prince Edward, Queen Elizabeth II, Princess Grace of Monaco, and Prince Bernhard of the Netherlands. Other visitors include British prime ministers Margaret Thatcher and John Major, Israel's prime minister Benjamin Netanyahu, and Secretary of States including George Shultz and Henry Kissinger. Other notable visitors include John Kerry, Arnold Schwarzenegger, Elizabeth Dole, Colin Powell, along with a number of celebrities such as Dinah Shore, Merv Griffin, Rosalind Russell, Red Skelton, Helen Hayes, Mary Martin, Kitty Carlisle, Hal Wallis, Art Linkletter, Mike Nichols, Oscar de la Renta, and Eppie Lederer.

== Sunnylands Center & Gardens ==
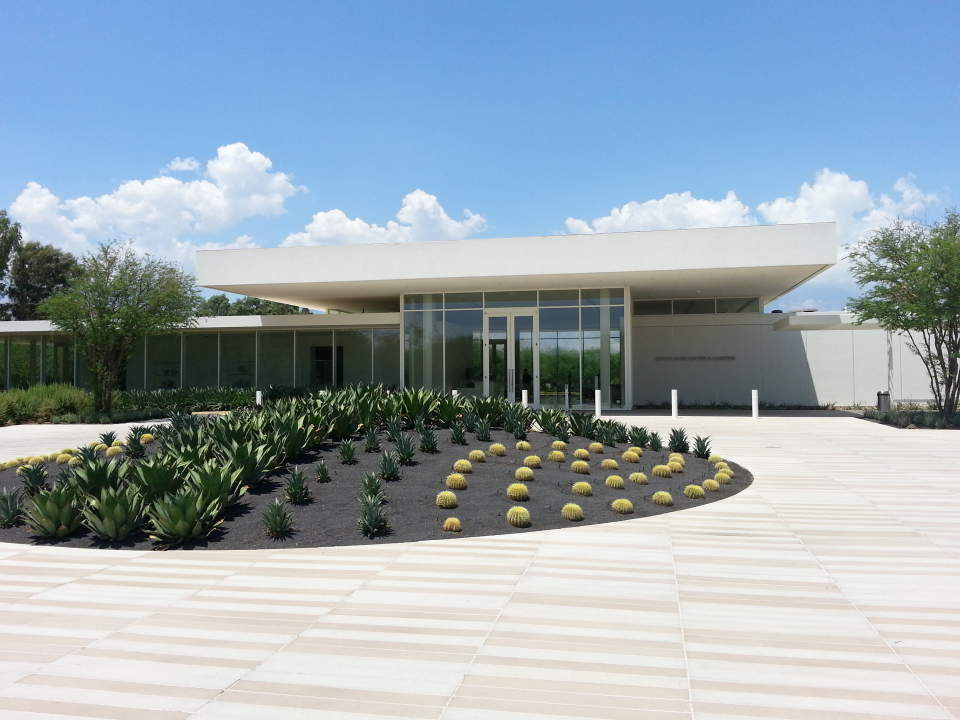
Sunnylands Visitor Center, 2012

Prior to her death in 2009, Lenore Annenberg identified 15 acres (0.061 km^{2}) adjacent to Sunnylands as the location for a visitor center. Frederick Fisher & Partners designed the 17,000-square-foot (1,600 m^{2}) building, which is open to the public on a regular basis and offers educational and historic information about the Annenbergs, Sunnylands, and the various Sunnylands collections. Nine acres of desert gardens surround Sunnylands Center. Designed by landscape architect James Burnett, the gardens include more than 53,000 individual plants.

After Ambassador Walter Annenberg's death in 2002 and his wife's death in March 2009, ownership was transferred to The Annenberg Foundation Trust at Sunnylands. Both Annenbergs are interred on the property.

The Annenbergs' collection of Impressionist paintings was donated to the Metropolitan Museum of Art in New York upon Walter Annenberg's death. Digital reproductions created by the Metropolitan Museum now hang in the historic house. Much of the Annenbergs' collection of modern sculpture, including works by Rodin, Giacometti, Arp, and Agam remained on the estate as part of the Sunnylands Collection. The collection also includes works by Pablo Picasso, Andrew Wyeth, and Romare Bearden, as well as important works of Chinese porcelain, Meissen vases, Chinese cloisonné objects and furniture, Tang dynasty funerary sculpture, Flora Danica china, Steuben glass, and English silver-gilt objects.

Several sculptures, including Auguste Rodin's Eternal Spring and Giacometti's Bust of Diego on Stele III, are on permanent display at Sunnylands Center. The center also features a rotating exhibition related to the art or history of the property. Limited, guided public tours of the house and estate grounds began on March 1, 2012.

== "Camp David of the West" ==
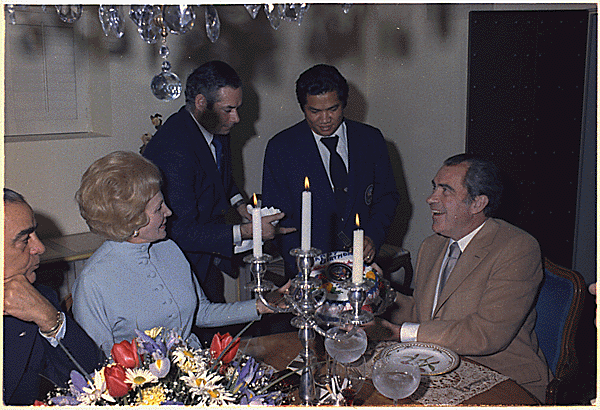
President Nixon celebrated his 61st birthday at Sunnylands in 1974. Leonore Annenberg is at left.

The Annenbergs envisioned Sunnylands becoming the "Camp David of the West," a place for national and foreign dignitaries and diplomats to gather for summit meetings and retreats in a relaxed setting, available to leaders from all political parties. President Dwight D. Eisenhower and his wife, Mamie, joined the Annenbergs to golf and fish. President Richard Nixon wrote his 1974 State of the Union Address at the house and, after leaving office, was a guest at Sunnylands when President Gerald Ford pardoned him for any wrongdoing in the Watergate scandal. President Ford and his wife Betty were frequent guests as well. President Ronald Reagan and Nancy Reagan were close friends of the Annenbergs and visited every New Year's for 18 years. President Reagan also delivered one of his final radio addresses to the nation and signed the intent to pursue NAFTA from Sunnylands in January 1989. President George H. W. Bush hosted a state dinner at the house for Japanese Prime Minister Toshiki Kaifu in 1990.

President Barack Obama used the site to meet with Chinese President Xi Jinping in 2013, King Abdullah II of Jordan in 2014, and ASEAN Summit leaders in 2016.
