= Joseph Coriaty =

American architect

Joseph Coriaty, FAIA
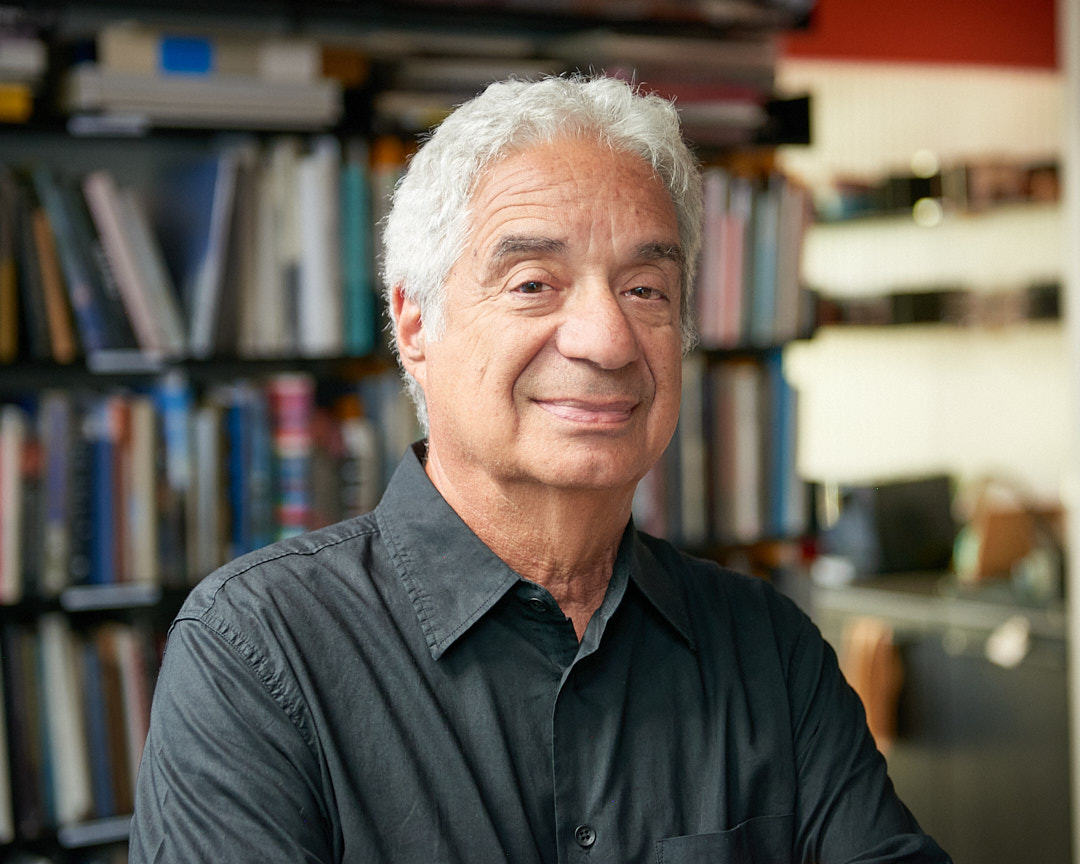
- Born: Detroit, Michigan
- Education: University of Detroit; University of Southern California
- Occupation: Architect
- Practice: Partner, Frederick Fisher and Partners
- Buildings: Santa Monica City Hall East; The Biltmore Tower at the Biltmore Hotel; Hillstone and Houston's Restaurants; Annenberg Center for Information Science and Technology at Caltech; Firestone Library at Princeton University; Annenberg Beach House; MoMA PS1; Colby College Museum of Art; Flint Institute of Arts

Joseph Coriaty, FAIA, is an American architect and managing partner at Frederick Fisher and Partners.

== Early life and education ==
Son of Joseph Said Coriaty and Therese Elaine Coriaty, Joseph Coriaty is one of six siblings. He was born in Detroit, Michigan, and spent his childhood in Riverview, Michigan, until 1965, when the Coriaty family moved to Trenton, Michigan. He attended Trenton High School, graduating in 1974.

Coriaty received his Bachelor of Science degree in architecture from the University of Detroit in 1978, where he graduated magna cum laude. Coriaty went on to receive his Master of Architecture degree from the University of Southern California in 1980. He has been a registered architect in the State of California since 1983.

== Professional career ==
After Coriaty earned his Master of Architecture degree from the University of Southern California in 1980, he spent the early part of his professional career at John Siebel Associate Architects in Los Angeles, California, John Carl Warnecke & Associates in Los Angeles, and Widom/Wein & Partners in Santa Monica, California. In 1983, Coriaty joined The Landau Partnership in Santa Monica, California, where he worked as the project architect on a number of notable projects, such as Central Park at Toluca Lake in Burbank, California, and The Biltmore Tower at the Los Angeles Biltmore Hotel in downtown Los Angeles.

Coriaty joined Frederick Fisher and Partners Architects in 1988, became a partner in 1995, and is currently the managing partner for the firm. His focus is the design of the firm's large-scale signature academic, library, institutional, and museum projects. Coriaty's strong interest in the process of making is founded in his early years spent in Detroit, a leading car-manufacturing city.

Key projects include Santa Monica City Hall East, a net-zero addition to the historic civic building meeting the Living Building Challenge; Firestone Library at Princeton University, a decade-long renovation of the university’s 430,000-square-foot library; Seaver Science Library at the University of Southern California; the Annenberg Center for Information Science and Technology at Caltech; Phase III of the Campus Expansion initiative at Otis College of Art and Design; the Annenberg Community Beach House in Santa Monica; the Alfond-Lunder Pavilion at Colby College Museum of Art in Waterville, Maine; the Bergamot Station Arts Complex and Redevelopment in Santa Monica; MoMA PS1 in Queens, New York; Hillstone and Houston's Restaurants across the country, including the Santa Monica location which received national design honors; the Flint Institute of Arts; the Science Education and Research Center for Crossroads School in Santa Monica; the Baum Family Maker Space at USC, a state-of-the-art hub for interdisciplinary innovation; and the renovation of UCLA Covel Dining Hall.

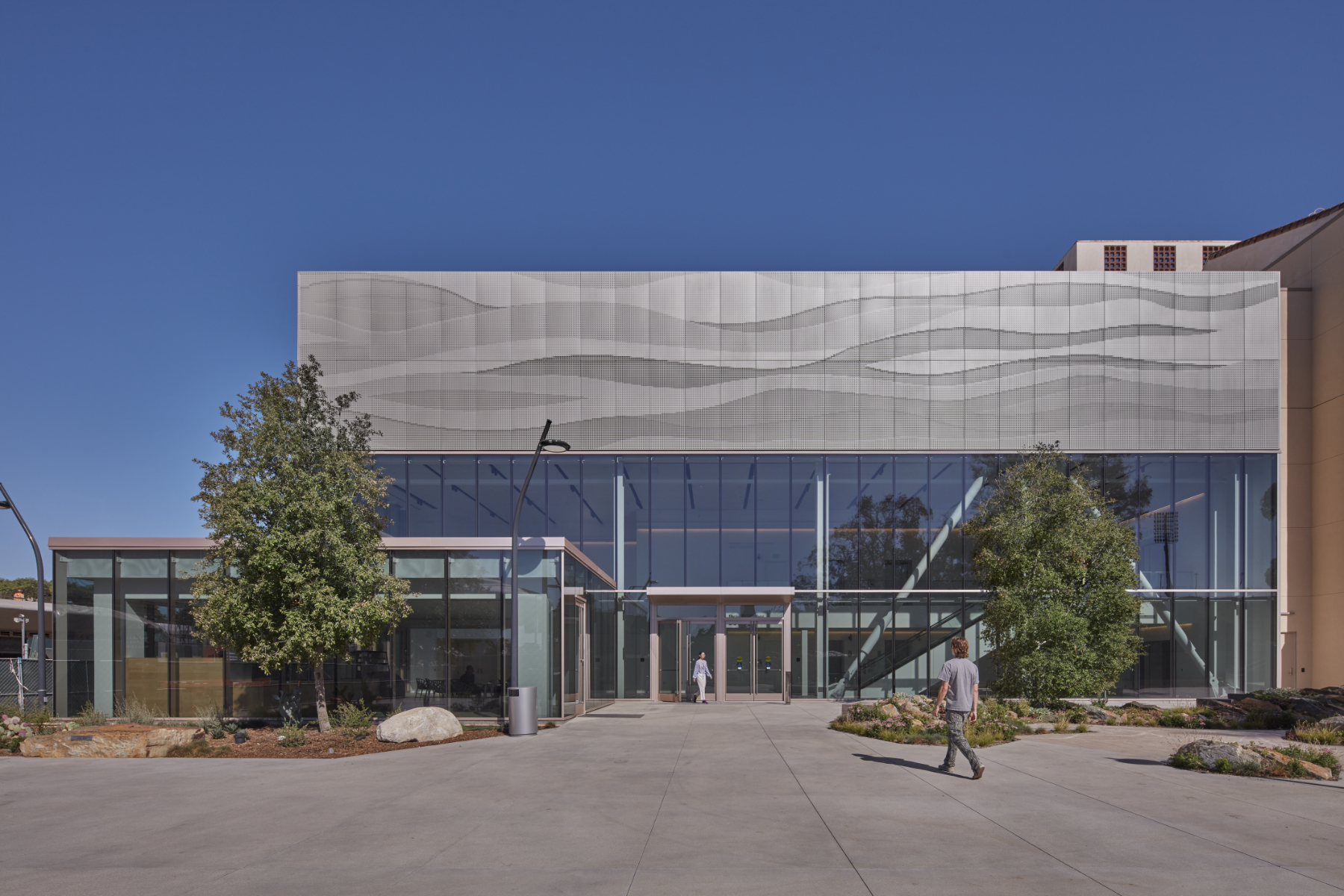
Natural History Museum Commons

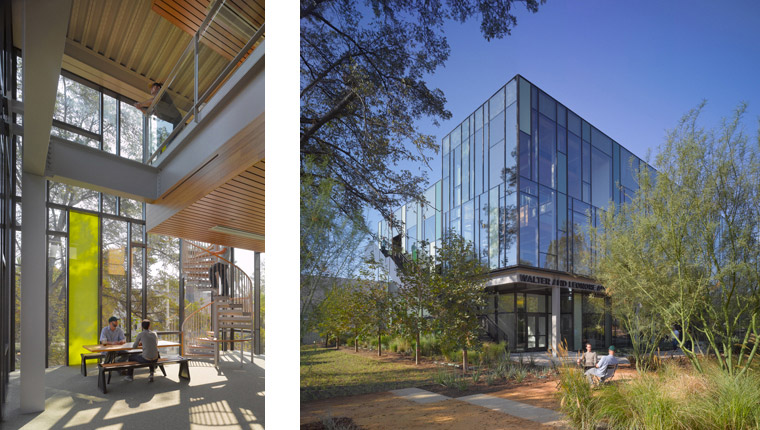
Caltech Annenberg Center for Information Science and Technology

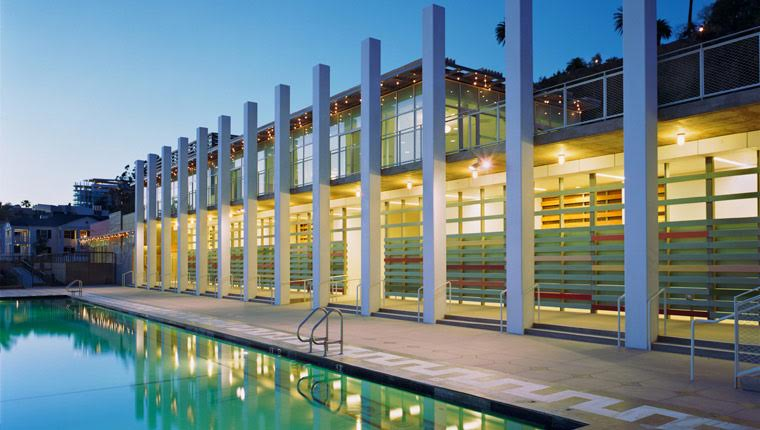
Annenberg Community Beach House

Flint Institute of Arts

Alfond Lunder Pavilion at Colby College

Hillstone Santa Monica

Princeton Firestone Library

Los Angeles Biltmore Tower

Awards attributed to projects that Coriaty was the partner-in-charge, designer, and/or project director include Top Prize for Excellence in Restaurant Design from the American Institute of Architecture, Los Angeles Chapter for the Santa Monica Houston's Restaurant project; the Westside Prize, Honor Award in Public Institutional Projects from the Westside Urban Forum for the Annenberg Community Beach House, and Design Merit Award from the Westside Urban Forum for the Annenberg Center for Information Science and Technology at Caltech.

Coriaty is on the Deans Board of Advisors at the University of Detroit Mercy, a Trustee of The Craft Contemporary Museum in Los Angeles, a Fellow on The American Institute of Architects, and a member of the following organizations: USC Architecture Guild, Society of College & University Planners, and the Southern California Development Forum.

== Design philosophy ==
Many of the recent public and institutional projects that Coriaty and his colleagues at Frederick Fisher and Partners have designed, including projects at Caltech as well as the Annenberg Community Beach House at Santa Monica State Beach, share many of the hallmarks of modern architecture: the clean lines, the boxy, glass-wrapped volumes, the disdain for literal historical ornament. They also show a decided interest in Minimalism, paying as much attention to the spaces between buildings as to the buildings themselves.

Other projects include the Colby College Art Museum in Waterville, Maine, where an enormous artistic bequest necessitated an addition to an existing exhibition space.

Coriaty traveled to Haiti with members of the Jesuit Refugee Service to evaluate damaged school buildings.

== Personal life ==
In 1978, Coriaty moved from Detroit to Santa Monica, California, where he has remained to date. He married Ann Marie Fredal in 1983 in Detroit, Michigan. They have two children.
