= Annenberg Community Beach House =

Public beach facility in California, US

Coordinates: 34°01′28″N 118°30′48″W

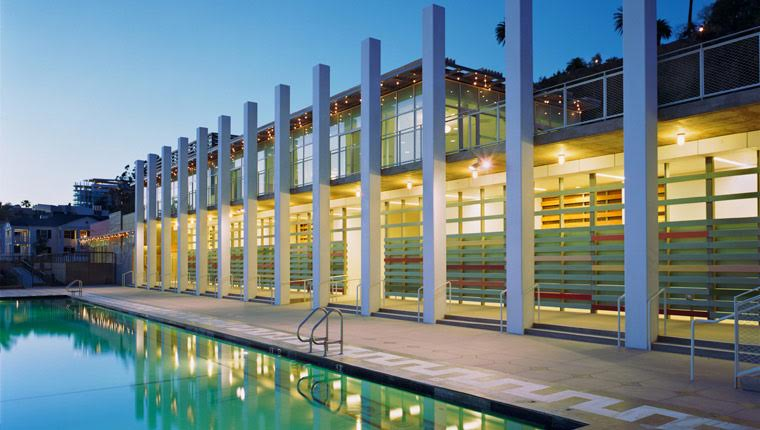
Annenberg Community Beach House

The Annenberg Community Beach House at Santa Monica State Beach is a public beach facility, open to all. The Beach House is on the location of a now-demolished 110-room mansion that was built for Marion Davies by William Randolph Hearst. The mansion's original pool was rehabilitated by the Annenberg Foundation and opened to the public on a fee-for-entry basis in 2009. The pool is trimmed in tile and has a marble deck. One of the mansion's original guest houses also still exists and is used for events.

== History ==
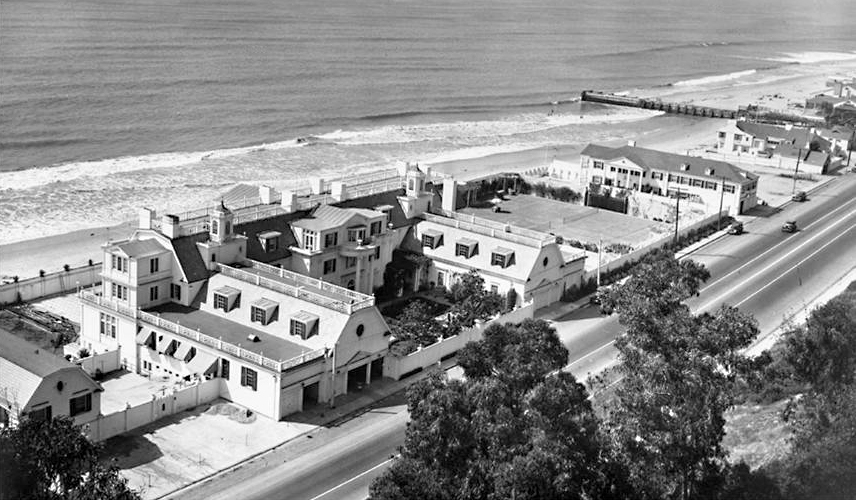
Marion Davies' Beach House in the 1930s

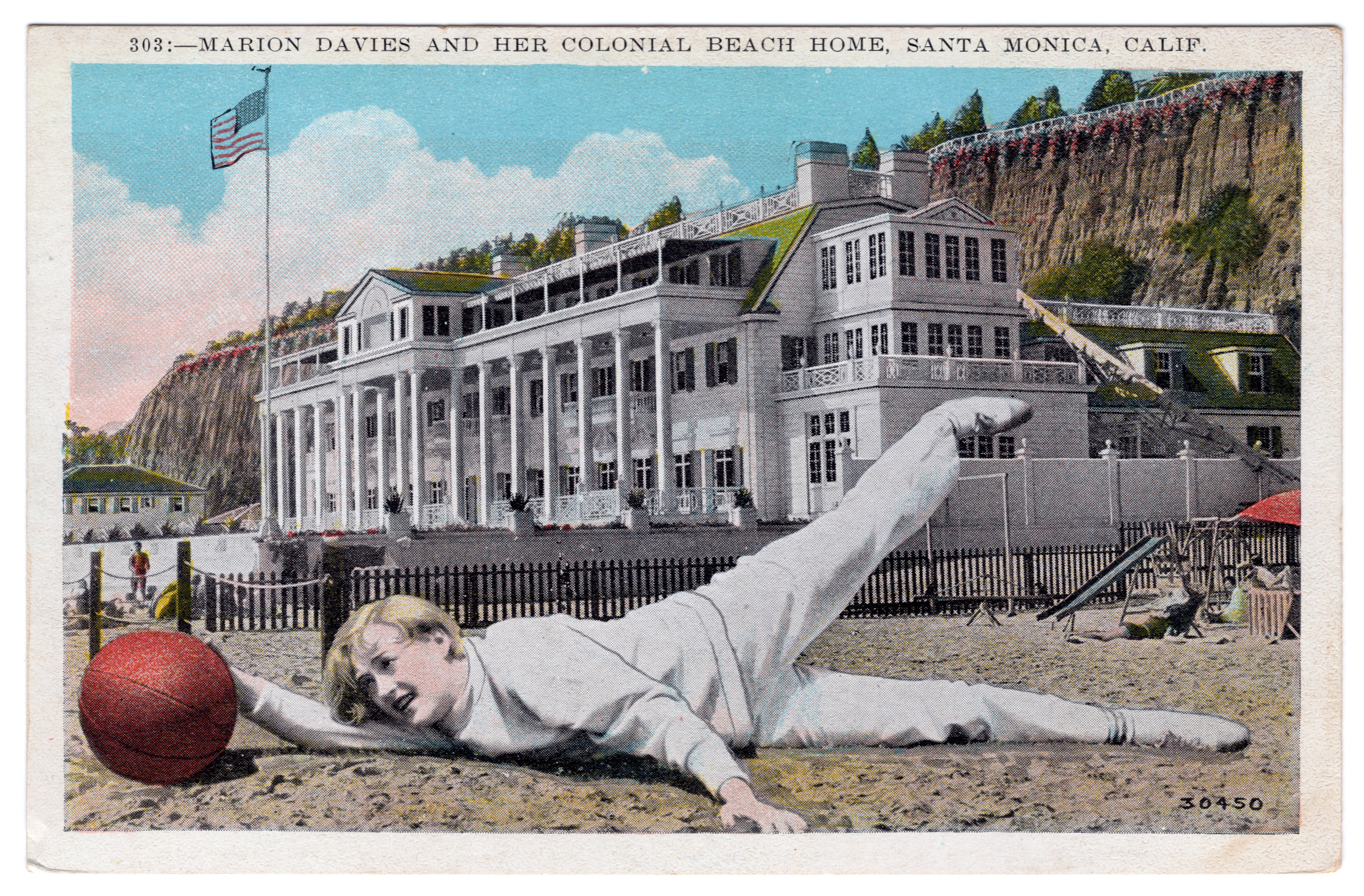
Postcard of Marion Davies in front of the Beach House

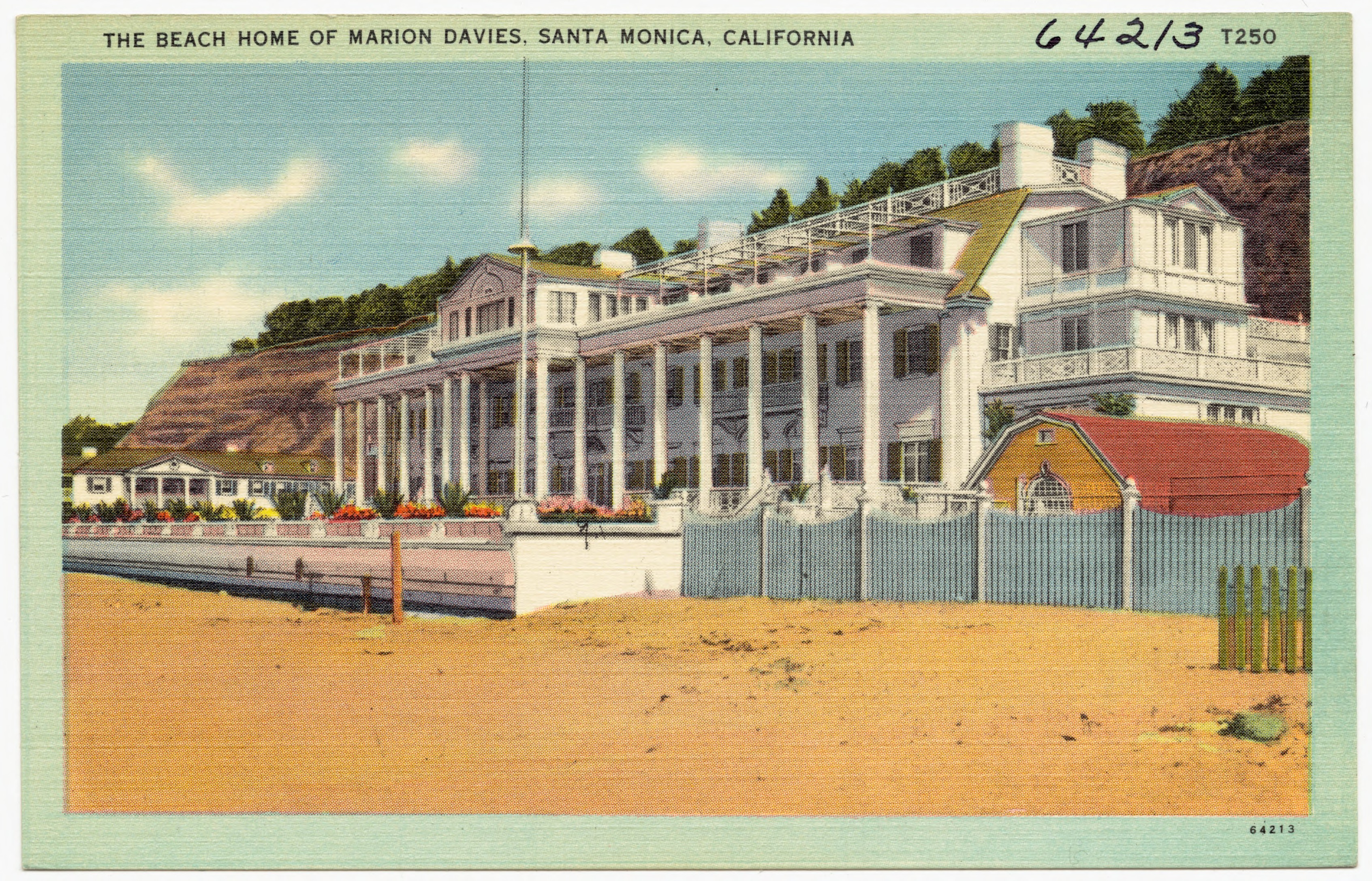
Postcard of the Beach House

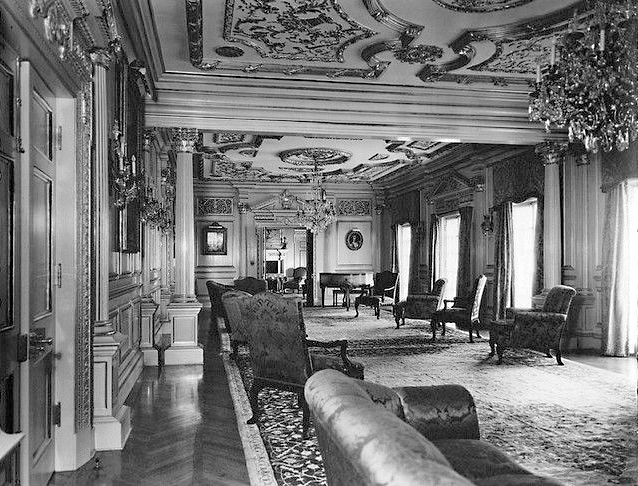
The gold room, the most elaborate room in the house, used for very formal social occasions (1934)

It almost got to be as big as the White House. Bigger, maybe. Just like you build with little blocks, he added on and on. But little blocks wouldn't have cost the money.

— Marion Davies

Built in 1929, Ocean House—later called simply the Beach House—was a hot spot on Santa Monica's Gold Coast in the 1930s and 1940s, as William Randolph Hearst and Marion Davies entertained Hollywood's elite at Davies' 5-acre (20,000 m^{2}) estate. Actress Colleen Moore is reported to have called Ocean House "the biggest house on the beach—the beach between San Diego and Vancouver".

Built from designs by Julia Morgan, the complex consisted of five opulently furnished Georgian Revival buildings, including a three-story 110-room mansion where Hearst and Davies lived. The four guest houses were used by Davies' family, guests, and 32 servants. There were tennis courts, gardens, and a 110-foot heated saltwater swimming pool lined with Italian marble, spanned at the center by a Venetian marble bridge. The final cost of Ocean House was $7 million—$3 million for construction and $4 million for furnishings.

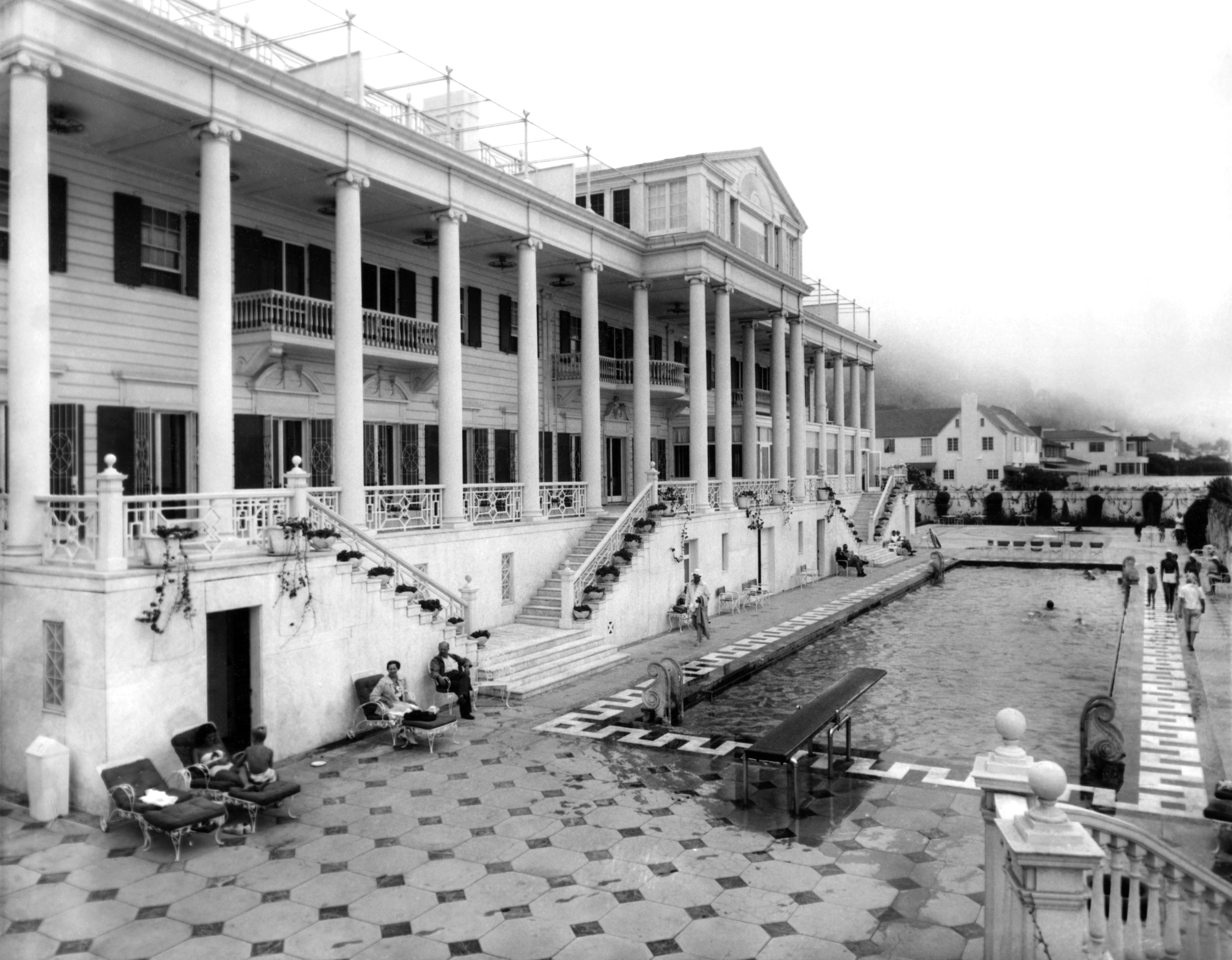
In 1949, the main building opened as a luxury hotel. The third-story gable in the center of the mansion had been the sun deck and sitting room of Marion Davies' private suite. When the Venetian marble bridge spanning the center of the pool was removed, Davies said that "the pool was ten feet deep in the middle, and I think it was absolutely wrong for them to remove it."

In 1947, Davies sold the estate for $600,000 to hotelier Joseph Drown, who operated it as a luxury hotel and limited-membership beach club. Over the opposition of neighbors Darryl F. Zanuck and Harold Lloyd, the mansion was demolished in 1956. The estate was sold to the State of California in 1960 and developed into a parking lot.

The Sand & Sea Club continued until the City of Santa Monica took over operation of the site in 1989. It was run as a public facility open to event rental and filming until the 1994 Northridge earthquake severely damaged all structures on site. After the earthquake, the City of Santa Monica conducted an extensive community process to re-envision the role of the site as an important community gathering space. The resulting reuse plan called for a facility with a 'light touch' on its surroundings and one that would encourage a diverse group of users. The project sat on hold while the City sought funding.

In 2005, the Annenberg Foundation, at the recommendation of Wallis Annenberg, made a financial commitment to realize the City's vision and preserve the site for public use. The Annenberg Community Beach House at Santa Monica State Beach opened to the public on April 25, 2009, representing a unique partnership between the Annenberg Foundation, California State Parks and the City of Santa Monica. The total construction costs were roughly $30 million. Local residents succeeded in forcing the city to significantly limit its hours of operation.

== Redevelopment ==
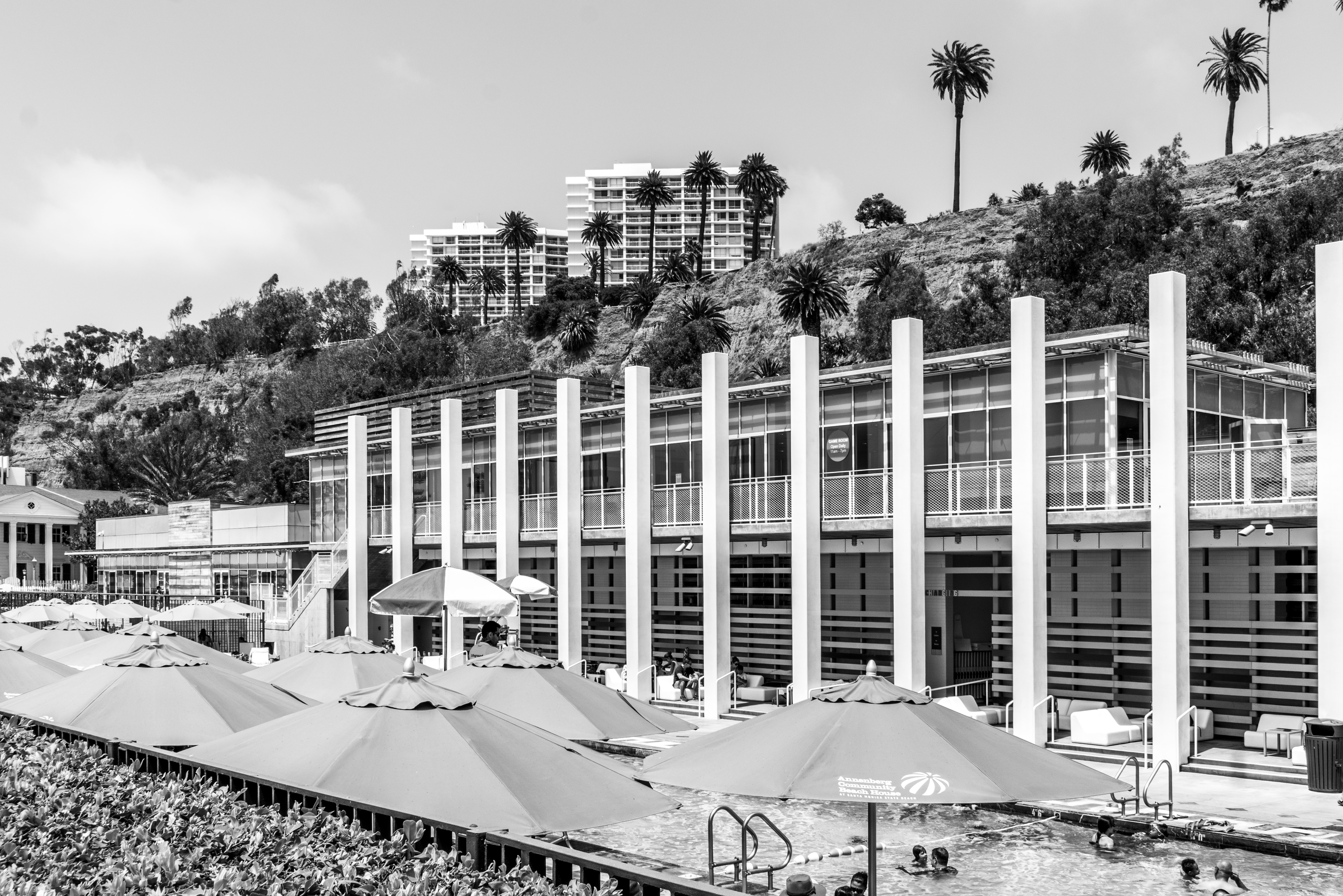
Annenberg Community Beach House (2016)

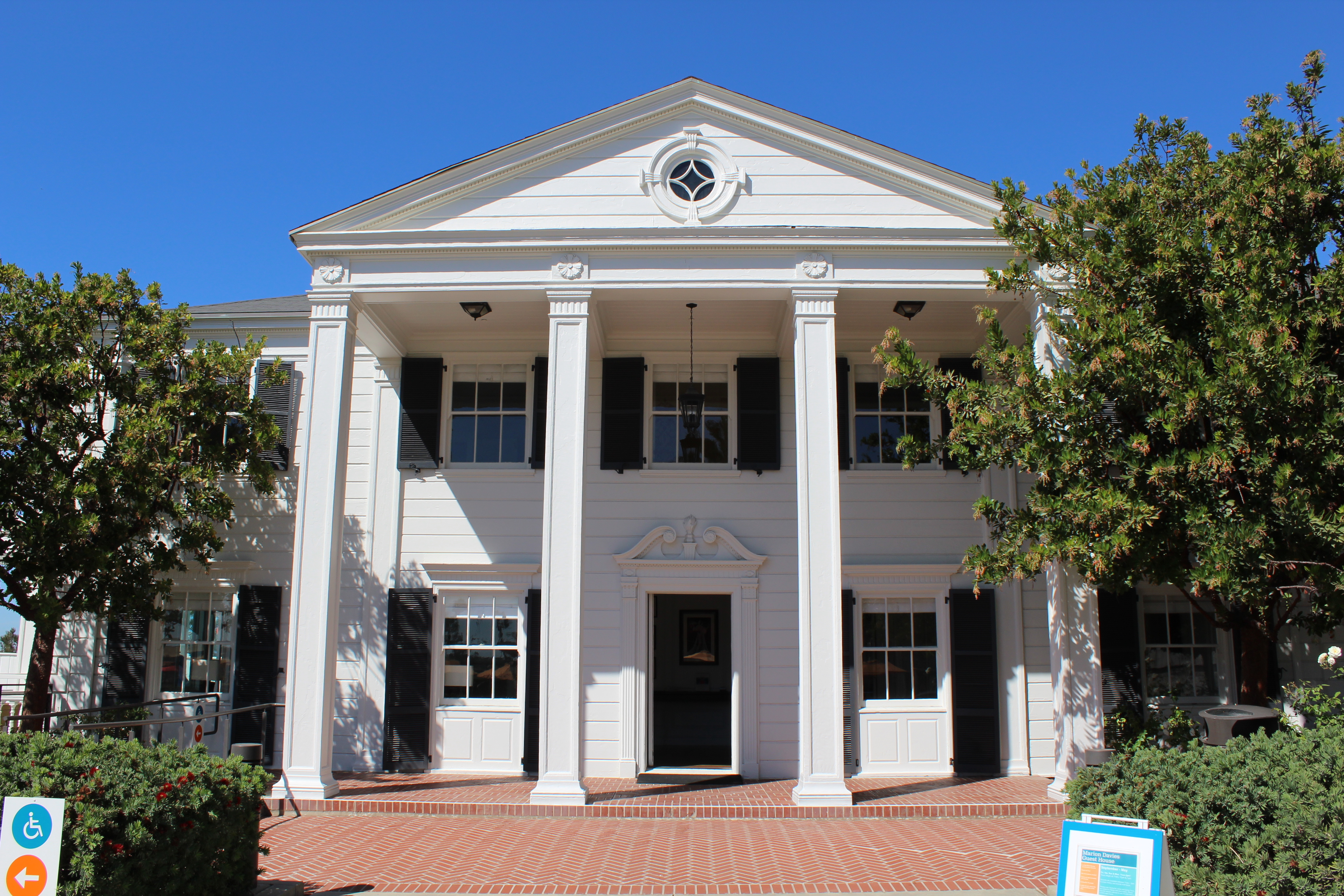
Entrance to the North House, a 7,000-square-foot guest house that remains from the original estate

Developed as a design-build partnership between Frederick Fisher and Partners Architects and Charles Pankow Builders, the Annenberg Community Beach House was conceived as a series of indoor/outdoor recreation and event spaces, both formal and informal, woven through the site. The primary organizing device is a concrete wall that serves a backbone to the disparate elements of the project and as a sound buffer to the adjacent highway. The wall is subtly stained with green stripes to suggest beach awnings. The new buildings and landscape elements of the project were designed to create a public gateway to the beach, an icon for the site's history and a framework for many kinds of community uses, returning the site to its former status as a landmark for the City and southern California. The new entry to the facility exists at its southern end with public parking and public transportation drop off areas. A high trellis frames the entrance on a boardwalk that runs the length of the site, parallel to the water, at the line of the mean high tide when the estate was developed. After the Santa Monica Pier was built, the mean high tide line has shifted to enlarge the beach by four hundred feet. This boardwalk is an index of the gradual changes in nature and is a link to each of the four main areas of the site: the Entrance, the Pool and Pool House, the Event House, and the Guest House. The entrance is flanked by the pre-existing "Back on the Beach" restaurant and public restrooms and showers on one side and the reception, ticketing and lifeguard building on the other. A shaded children's play area and restaurant take-out window are just past the entrance on the beach.

The historic pool and deck area, with restored tile mosaics and stone paving, is within a landscaped enclosure below the beach level. Facing the pool is a freestanding white colonnade that defines the location and scale of the mansion's façade. The footprint of the huge structure is delineated on the parking lot behind the Pool House. Behind the colonnade, a series of 14 concrete pillars, each 30 feet high, is the new Pool House with changing rooms, restrooms and built-in cabana areas lined with wood stained in colors taken from the pool tile. On the second floor is a glass-enclosed event room and open terrace that overlooks the pool, with views along the coast from the Santa Monica Pier to the Santa Monica Mountains and back to Palisades Park Midway along the boardwalk, at the center line of the old mansion, a second boardwalk facilitates accessibility across the deep beach to the water's edge. Continuing north, the boardwalk passes beach volleyball courts that maintain the game's presence on the site where it was invented. On the inland side of the boardwalk north of the pool is a series of ground level terraces framed with landscape. These areas include a children's play area with a water feature and other spaces shaded by palm and melaleuca trees. The Event House contains three rooms of different sizes, two with fireplaces, for community use.

The boardwalk terminates at the north parking lot. Beach activities are supported by a small building that supplies umbrellas, chairs, boogie boards and other beach paraphernalia. Beach volleyball courts are available for public use as well.

The historic guest house is the focal point of the sequence of spaces and structures. Carefully restored, the North House is set within gardens and terraces that create a series of outdoor rooms. A sculptural installation in front of the house by artist Roy McMakin relates to feelings of tradition and domesticity. A waterfall masks the highway sound in this space between the guest house and the Event House. The guest house accommodates community uses and didactic exhibits about the site's history.

== See also ==
- History of Santa Monica, California
