= Wallis Annenberg =

American philanthropist and heiress (1939–2025)

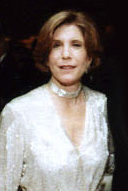
- Annenberg in 1981
- Born: Wallis Huberta Annenberg; July 15, 1939; Philadelphia, Pennsylvania, U.S.
- Died: July 28, 2025 (aged 86); Los Angeles, California, U.S.
- Education: Pine Manor College
- Occupation: Philanthropist
- Known for: Annenberg Foundation
- Spouse: Seth Weingarten (m. 1960; div. 1975)
- Children: 4, including Lauren Bon
- Father: Walter Annenberg
- Relatives: Moses Annenberg (grandfather); Janet Annenberg Hooker (aunt); Enid Haupt (aunt); Leonore Annenberg (stepmother)

Wallis Huberta Annenberg (July 15, 1939 – July 28, 2025) was an American philanthropist and heiress. Annenberg served as president and chairwoman of the board of the Annenberg Foundation, a multibillion-dollar philanthropic organization in the United States.

== Early life and education ==
Wallis Annenberg was born in Philadelphia on July 15, 1939, into a Jewish family, the daughter of publishing magnate Walter Hubert Annenberg, and his first wife, Bernice Veronica Dunkelman, known as Ronny, a socialite from Toronto, Canada. Her grandfather Moses Annenberg (1877–1942), owner of The Philadelphia Inquirer, emigrated from Germany to Chicago in 1900. Her father owned a 15-acre (61,000 m^{2}) estate called Inwood, where Wallis was raised.

When she was 10 years old, her parents divorced and her mother moved to Washington, D.C., to marry Ben Ourisman, a Chevrolet car dealer. Meanwhile, her father remarried in the year after the divorce to Leonore "Lee" Cohn, the niece of Columbia Pictures President Harry Cohn.

Wallis Annenberg graduated in 1959 from Pine Manor College, when it was a junior college.

She had a brother, Roger, who died by suicide at the age of 22 in 1962, while in treatment for schizophrenia. She named one of her sons after her brother.

== Marriage and divorce ==
On a trip to Venice, in 1959, Annenberg met and fell in love with Seth Weingarten, who was just beginning studies at Yale Medical School. After only one year of studies at Columbia, Annenberg dropped out of school and married Weingarten at Inwood in 1960. They moved around the country, following her husband's career.

They had four children: Lauren, born in New Haven, Connecticut, in 1961; Roger, who was named after Wallis's deceased brother; Gregory, born in New York City during Weingarten's residency at New York Hospital; and Charles, born in Roswell, New Mexico, where Weingarten was serving as a medical officer at Walker Air Force Base. Weingarten accepted a position at the hospital now known as Ronald Reagan UCLA Medical Center, and they established a permanent home in California.

In 1975, she divorced Weingarten. In 1978, he won the custody of the children. In 1979, he offered Wallis full custody. She never remarried. During the divorce proceedings, she had been outed in court as a lesbian. She remained semi-closted for the rest of her life. She was in a two year relationship with journalist Karen Ocamb in the 1980s, and raised millions of dollars for LGBT and HIV/AIDS organizations throughout her career.

== Career ==
When Wallis started to work for Triangle Publications, which included TV Guide and Seventeen magazine, as well as radio and TV stations nationwide, her father was its chairman of the board. She stayed for three years after its sale to Rupert Murdoch in 1988.

She appeared on The Late Show with Joan Rivers on the new Fox television network in 1986, alongside actresses Lucille Ball and Michele Lee.

== Death ==
Annenberg died from lung cancer at her home in Los Angeles, on July 28, 2025, at the age of 86.

== Philanthropy ==
After she died in March 2009, Leonore Annenberg left the leadership of the Annenberg Foundation to Wallis and three of her children: Lauren, Gregory, and Charles. Wallis Annenberg carried on her father's legacy as a public benefactor. As chairman and president of the Annenberg Foundation, she donated the family name and fortune to philanthropic and charitable projects, including Wallis Annenberg High School, mainly to the benefit of Los Angeles County. She served on the board of trustees at the Los Angeles County Museum of Art, and the Museum of Contemporary Art, Los Angeles. She was a supporter of the Harlem Children's Zone, the Ojai Foundation's "Council project" for inner-city kids, and the Ocean Alliance. She served on the board of trustees at the University of Southern California, home of the USC Annenberg School for Communication and Journalism. In 2014, the Wallis Annenberg Hall at USC was opened as part of the Annenberg School. In 2017, she was honored with the USC University Medallion for her philanthropy and leadership.

Wallis Annenberg received The Perfect World Foundation Award 2025 – The Conservationist of the Year – during a ceremony in Beverly Hills, honoring her philanthropic commitment to wildlife and the preservation of our planet’s biodiversity.

She was involved with the Wallis Annenberg Concourse at the Ronald Reagan UCLA Medical Center, and the Wallis Annenberg Center for the Performing Arts, which held its opening gala in October 2013.

She was inspired by and provided funding to build the Universally-Accessible Treehouse in Torrance, California. "It is thrilling to be able to make it possible for people of all ages and physical abilities to experience the world from a treehouse," said Wallis Annenberg. "There's a sense of vision, fun, and pure escape that only such a structure can provide."

Annenberg served on the board of directors for the New York-based chapter of the foundation of Princess Charlene of Monaco.

Her children, Lauren Bon, Gregory Weingarten, and Charles Weingarten serve on the board of directors of the Annenberg Foundation. Her son Roger Weingarten, a resident of Devereux in Santa Barbara, California, who was diagnosed with schizophrenia at age 15, like his namesake, is not on the board. Despite her father leaving the majority of his multibillion-dollar fortune to the Annenberg Foundation, it was estimated that Annenberg had a personal fortune in excess of five hundred million dollars.

Her philanthropic projects included Wallis Annenberg PetSpace, Wallis Annenberg GenSpace, Wallis Annenberg Center for the Performing Arts, Annenberg Space for Photography, Annenberg Community Beach House, and the Wallis Annenberg Wildlife Crossing, which will be the largest wildlife crossing in the world when it opens in 2026.

Prior to her death, Wallis Annenberg and the Annenberg Foundation were instrumental in supporting Los Angeles' recovery from the January 2025 Southern California wildfires impacting Altadena and Pacific Palisades. She organized "LA Check In," a livestream fundraiser featuring D-Nice and will.i.am, to boost relief efforts. Annenberg emphasized the fires' devastating impact on people, wildlife, and key initiatives like the Wallis Annenberg Wildlife Crossing, which was threatened by the Kenneth Fire. The Foundation continues to provide financial aid, raise awareness, and strengthen community resilience in the face of environmental disaster.

In 2025, Annenberg was honored with The Perfect World Foundation Award for her philanthropic efforts, including her support for the Wallis Annenberg Wildlife Crossing.
