= Corn construction =

Use of corn (maize) in construction

Corn construction refers to the use of corn (maize) in construction. The tassel, leaf, silk, cob in husks, and the stalk are the parts of corn. According to the Michigan Department of Agriculture, "corn can be made into fuel, abrasives, solvents, charcoal, animal feed, bedding for animals, insulation, adhesives, and more. The kernel is used as oil, bran, starch, glutamates, animal feed, and solvents. The silk is combined with other parts of the corn plant to be used as part of animal feed, silage, and fuels. Husks are made into dolls and used as filling materials. The stalk is used to make paper, wallboard, silage, syrup, and rayon (artificial silk)."

== History ==
Corn has long been used in manufacturing. There were a number innovations in the United States in the early 1900s. For example, Henry Ford's conceptual Model U car featured tires with corn-based filler and a corn-based fabric roof.

The Corn Palace, a building in Mitchell, South Dakota, is decorated with murals and designs made from corn and other grains.

== Materials ==
=== Husks ===
The outer husk of corn can be used to make corn husk dolls, txalaparta musical instruments, and other crafts. Husks are used as the wrapper for tamales. The husk is also used in South American countries as a cigarette rolling paper.

=== Corncobs ===
Corncobs, the core of corn ears, are very absorbent. They have been used to make inexpensive smoking pipes, and to transport various materials. Ground corn cobs make an effective blasting media, are friendly to the environment, and delicate while maintaining abrasive capacity.

Corncobs are increasingly being used as a low-cost, environmentally friendly insulation material for houses.

=== Cornstarch ===
Goodyear BioTRED tires are made using a biologic polymer derived from cornstarch as the filler.

=== Corn kernels ===
Corn kernel burning stoves have found increasing popularity following the rise in natural gas and fuel oil prices. Large corn furnaces are capable of heating any size building, and fueling generators to produce electricity. Corn kernels are a natural pellet, which makes corn less expensive and more readily available than wood byproduct pellets. Manufactured pellets sold out in 2005, while corn is readily available for a much better price. Heat savings go up to 75% over natural gas or fuel oil.

== Plastics ==
Recently, corn has been used to make biodegradable containers. Corn can be used to create non-petroleum plastic, which is often compostable.

== See also ==
- Maize
- Not A Cornfield
- Cob (building)
