= Hooker Emerald Brooch =

Emerald brooch designed by Tiffany & Co.

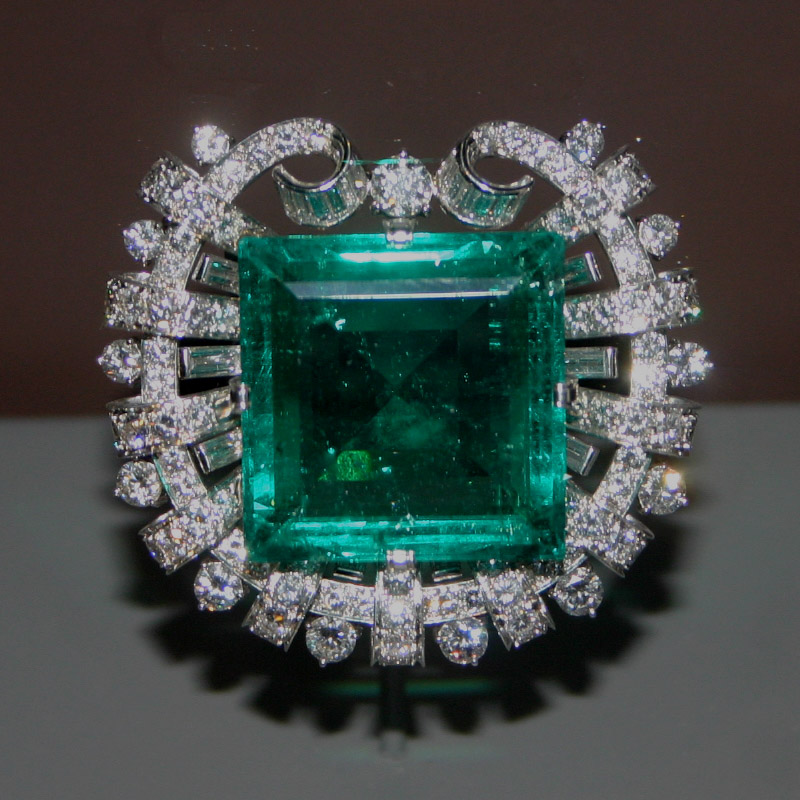
- The Hooker Emerald Brooch on display in the Janet Annenberg Hooker Hall of Geology, Gems, and Minerals at the NMNH
- Type of stone: Emerald, diamond
- Weight: 75.47 carats (15.094 g) total 13 carats (2.6 g) diamond
- Dimensions: 27 millimetres (1.1 in)
- Color: Emerald green
- Country of origin: Colombia
- Mine of origin: unidentified
- Discovered: 16th or 17th century
- Original owner: Spanish conquistadors
- Owner: Smithsonian Institution
- Estimated value: US$5,000,000

The Hooker Emerald Brooch is an emerald brooch designed by Tiffany & Co. The brooch is on display in the Janet Annenberg Hooker Hall of Geology, Gems, and Minerals at the Smithsonian Institution's National Museum of Natural History in Washington D.C., United States.

== Description ==
The Hooker Emerald Brooch consists of an open-ended circular band of platinum. The two ends of the band curl outwards into scrolls, and are connected by a round brilliant cut diamond. 108 other round brilliant cut diamonds are studded along the band. Spokes cross the band, converging to form the setting for the Hooker Emerald at the centre of the brooch. Ten pairs of baguette-cut diamonds project between the spokes from behind the emerald towards the platinum band. The Hooker Emerald itself weighs 75.47 carats (15.094 g). It measures 27 millimetres (1.1 in) to a side and is remarkably free of inclusions for its size. The gem's cut gives the appearance of a series of concentric squares within the gemstone (known as a beveled square emerald cut.) In total, the brooch contains approximately 13 carats (2.6 g) of diamonds.

== History ==
The Hooker Emerald was extracted from an unidentified mine in Colombia in the 16th or 17th century. The rough emerald was sent to Europe by Spanish conquistadors to be cut and polished, before being sold to the ruling family of the Ottoman Empire. The emerald was made part of the crown jewels of the Empire during the reign of Sultan Abdul Hamid II, the last Ottoman Sultan to rule with absolute power; he wore it mounted into a belt buckle.

In 1908, many of the Ottoman crown jewels were smuggled on behalf of Abdul Hamid II to Paris. Included in the collection were the Hooker Emerald and, supposedly, the Hope Diamond. The Sultan feared a potential coup by the Young Turks, and hoped that the proceeds from the sale of the gems would allow him to escape to a comfortable life in exile should a revolution come to pass. However, the money raised by the sale of the gems—to a dealer by the name of Salomon or Selim Habib—fell to the succeeding government following the Young Turk Revolution. In 1911, Habib auctioned the collection received from Abdul Hamid II to cover debt repayments.

The winner of the auction was American jewellery company Tiffany & Co., who initially set the emerald in a tiara. The tiara remained unsold for several decades, so in 1950 the stone was removed and re-set into a brooch. The brooch was featured with matching earrings in that year's Christmas catalogue. It remained with the company until 1955, when it was purchased by Janet Annenberg Hooker, a philanthropic heiress and the emerald's namesake, for an undisclosed price. In 1977, Hooker donated the brooch, then valued at US$500,000, to the Smithsonian Institution in Washington, D.C. The brooch was the first gift by Hooker to the museum, and was followed by the donation of the Hooker Starburst Diamonds, and by a cash donation of $5,000,000 towards the construction of a new gallery for the display of gems and minerals. The Hooker Emerald Brooch is, as of 2010, on display at the gallery, which has been named in Hooker's honour.

== See also ==
- Colombian emeralds
- Chivor, Muzo
