= Frederick Fisher (architect) =

American architect

Frederick B. Fisher, AIA, FAAR
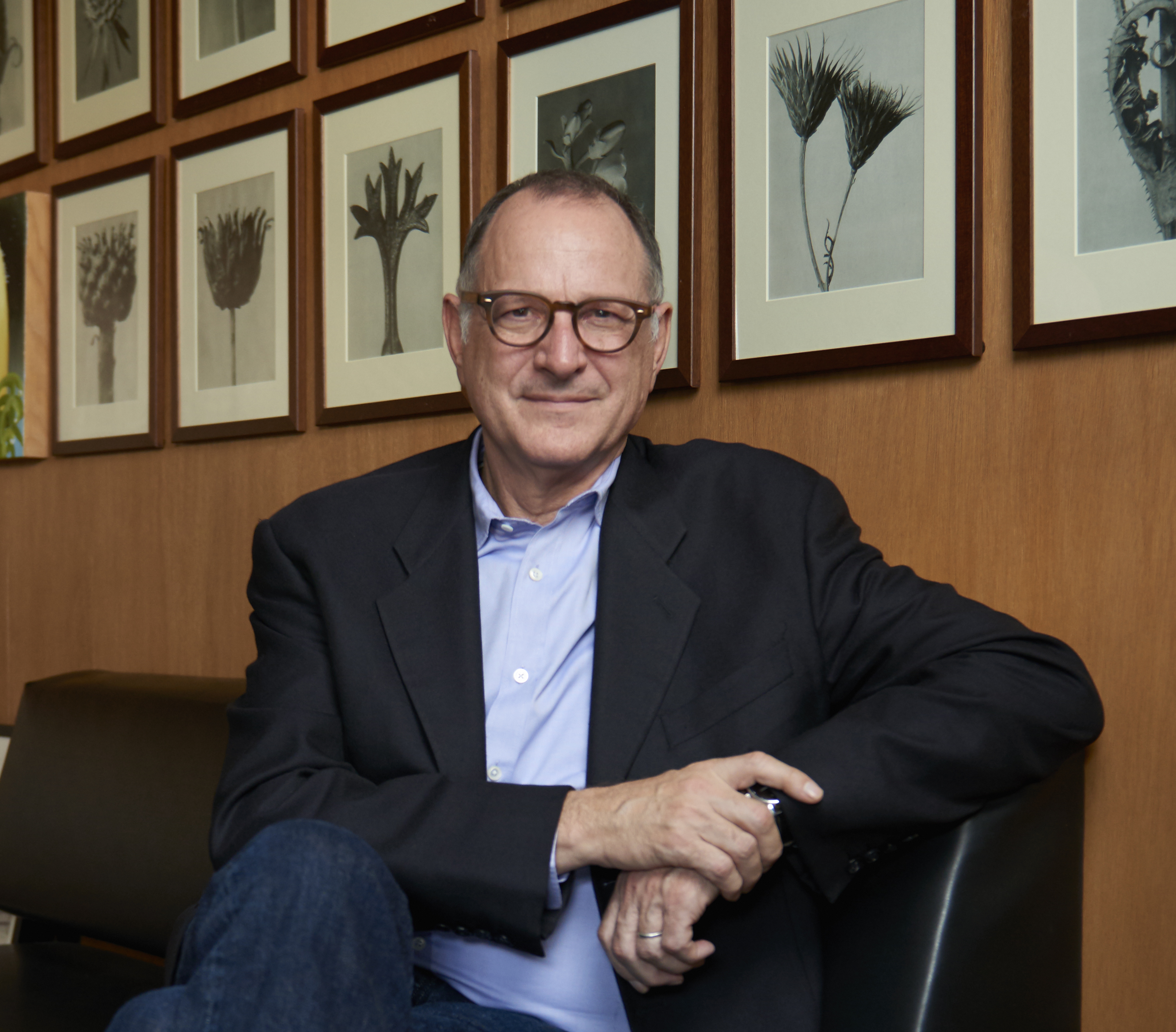
- Fisher in 2014
- Born: Ohio, United States of America
- Education: Oberlin College (BA), UCLA (M.Arch.)
- Occupation: Architect
- Awards: 2013 AIA/LA Gold Medal; 2008 Rome Prize in Architecture
- Practice: Frederick Fisher and Partners Architects
- Buildings: Annenberg Community Beach House
- Projects: Sunnylands Visitor Center; MoMA PS1; Huntington Library
- Website: www.fisherpartners.net

Frederick B. Fisher, AIA, FAAR, is an American architect whose professional practice is headquartered in Southern California. Frederick Fisher started his architecture firm in 1980 which partnered architects Joseph Coriaty and David Ross in 1995. Fisher is most noted for building seminal academic institutions, museums, and contemporary residential projects throughout the United States, Europe and Asia. His approach to architecture comes from a broad cultural and social perspective.

Fred currently serves as a member of the Board of Councilors for the USC School of Architecture. He chaired the Environmental Design Department at Otis College of Art & Design. In addition, he has held numerous visiting instructor posts including USC, Harvard University Graduate School of Design, Columbia University, Southern California Institute of Architecture (SCI-Arc), and the Department of Architecture and Urban Design at UCLA.

He has served as the architect for several renowned cultural landmarks including the Annenberg Community Beach House in Santa Monica and the visitor center of the Sunnylands Estate in Rancho Mirage, California.

== Early life ==
Fisher is the son of an architect. He received his undergraduate degree in Art and Art History from Oberlin College and his Master of Architecture degree from the University of California, Los Angeles (UCLA) in 1972.

== Select awards and recognition ==
- In 2001, he was awarded a first-ever C.O.L.A. Grant for architects from the City of Los Angeles.
- Brendan Gill Prize for P.S.1 Contemporary Art Center in New York in 2001
- 2006 for Houston's Restaurants in Denver and Santa Monica
- an AIA Design award for the Santa Ynez Residence in 2007,
- 2008 Orchid Award for the Oceanside Museum of Art,
- 2009 Westside Prize and SCDF Design Award for the Annenberg Community Beach House,
- 2009 AIA Honor Award and SCDF Design Award for the Annenberg Center for Information Science and Technology at Caltech,
- AIA Restaurant Design Awards in 2009,
- 2011 Innovation Awards “Best in Show” for the Annenberg IST Center at Caltech,

Frederick is a Fellow with the American Academy in Rome, having won the 2008 Franklin D. Israel Rome Prize in Architecture.
