= Zoltan Pali =

American architect

- Born: May 28, 1960 (age 66); Los Angeles, California
- Education: University of California, Los Angeles
- Occupation: Architect

Zoltan Pali (born 1960) is an architect from Los Angeles, California.

== Early life ==
Zoltan Pali was born May 28, 1960, at the French Hospital in Chinatown, Los Angeles, California, to Emery Pali and Maria [Szalacsy] Pali. His parents were immigrants from Budapest just after the 1956 Hungarian Revolution. His father taught him the basics of drawing - particularly mechanical drafting - and by the time Zoltan was 15 years old he was able to work summers in various engineering and architectural offices as a draftsperson. He grew up in Los Angeles, Encino, and Tarzana. He attended William Howard Taft High School in Woodland Hills from 1975 to 1978. He completed his design degree at the University of California, Los Angeles (UCLA) in 1983.

== Career ==
His professional career started in Santa Monica where he worked for Wexco, VCA, and Solberg + Lowe Architects. In 1986 he started working independently. He met Judit Meda Fekete in 1989 and the two forged a partnership. However, with virtually no commissions, they both found employment with various architectural practices in Los Angeles. During this period Zoltan met Jerrold E. Lomax, FAIA and began a professional and mentor/student friendship that lasted until Lomax's death in May 2014. The collaboration with Lomax included the completion of the Benjamin Residence and the J. Robert Scott Showroom. By 1995, Lomax had moved his practice to Carmel Valley, California, while Zoltan and Judit formed what is now their architectural practice - Studio Pali Fekete architects [aka SPF:a].

Zoltan achieved architectural licensure in the State of California in 1989. He became a member of the American Institute of Architects in 1993.

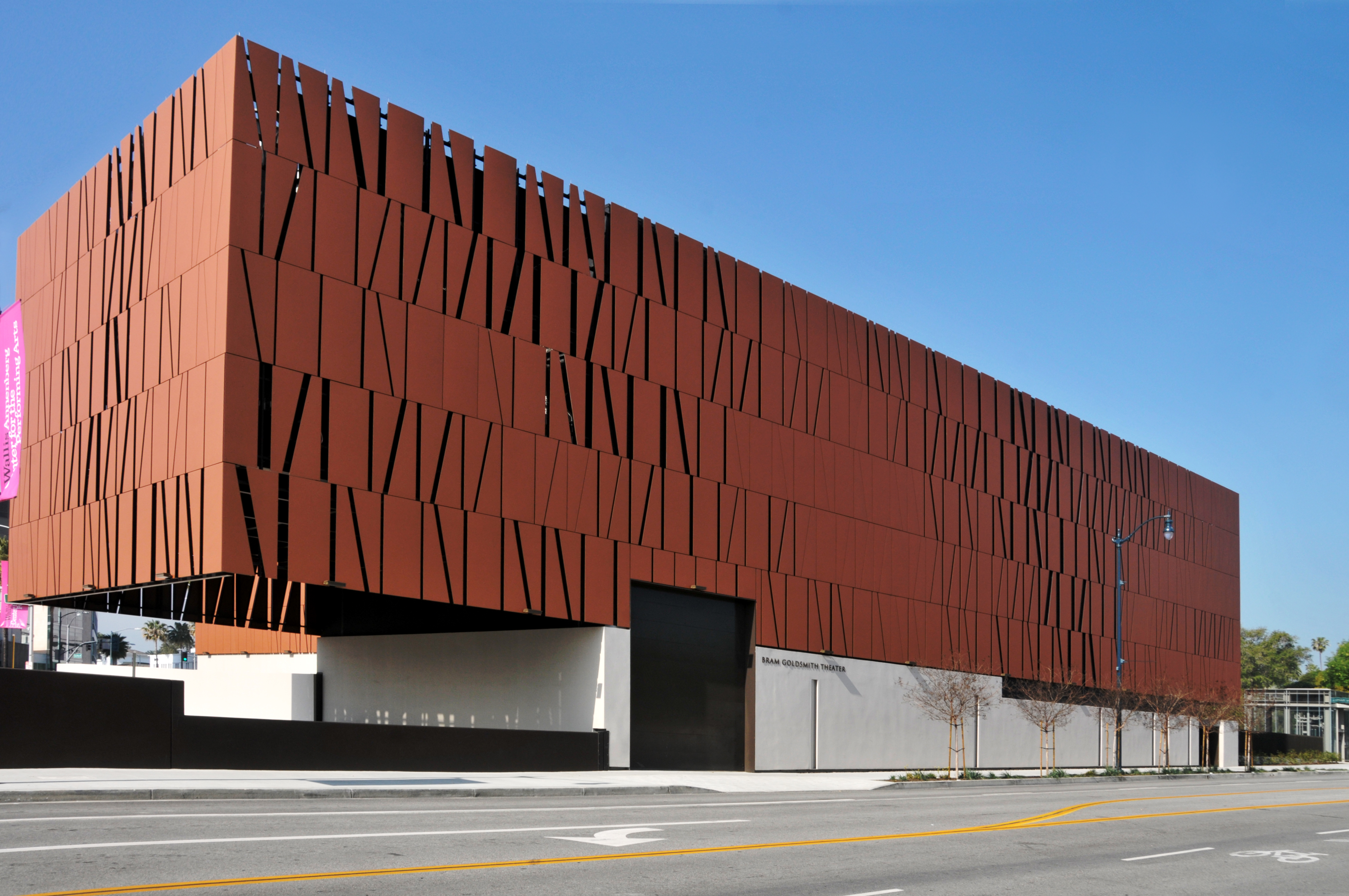
The Wallis Annenberg Center for the Performing Arts in Beverly Hills, California, designed by Zoltan Pali.

In 2001, Zoltan completed the renovations to the Pantages Theatre in Hollywood. In the very same year he started work as the executive architect for the Getty Villa with the design architects, Machado-Slivetti Associates. The Getty Villa was completed in 2006. In 2005 he completed restoration and renovations at the Greek Theatre in Griffith Park. In 2006 he was hired by the Los Angeles County Museum of Art to renovate the LACMA West building - of which only a portion of the work was completed. With his partner Judy, they built the MODAA building in Culver City, California which is a 30,000 square foot building with retail, gallery, office and live work spaces completing it in 2006. The MODAA building also houses their studio.

In 2005, Zoltan was inducted into the American Institute of Architects College of Fellows. He was also commissioned to teach a topic studio at USC by the late Dean Robert Timme as a visiting professor. Also in 2005, he was named an Emerging Voice by the New York Architectural League. That very same year, he won an American Institute of Architects Honor Award for Architecture for the Somis Hay Barn.

Residential Architect named Zoltan and his partner, Judit Fekete as a Top 50 firm in 2010.

In a Los Angeles Times article in January 2013, Christopher Hawthorne, LA Times Architecture Critic wrote that “The founder and design principal of L.A.’s SPF:architects is poised for a banner 2013. His collaboration with Renzo Piano on a forthcoming film museum for the Academy of Motion Pictures Arts and Sciences at the old May Co. building, on the western edge of the LACMA campus, is picking up speed. And fall will bring the opening of the firm’s Wallis Annenberg Center for the Performing Arts, an extension and re-imagining of a 1933 post office in Beverly Hills.”

Zoltan has been featured twice in L.A. Confidential magazine.

In late 2011 competition design work began on the Academy Museum of Motion Pictures for the Academy of Motion Pictures Arts and Sciences. By spring of 2012 the project had expanded and it became a collaboration with Renzo Piano and the Renzo Piano Building Workshop. During this time, architectural writer Fred A. Bernstein wrote in an Architectural Record article titled ‘Piano, Pali to Convert Moderne Landmark into Movie Museum, “The project is a breakthrough for Pali, who had already been working on a plan for the May Company building for LACMA before Piano was hired. Pali has renovated several important performance venues in California and worked with Machado and Silvetti on the restoration of the Getty Villa in Malibu, for which he served as executive architect. This time, Pali will be a full collaborator. “We’ve joined forces,” Piano said. “If Zoltan did not exist, he should be invented. Design is like playing ping-pong.” In April 2014, Zoltan and his firm exited the project.

Zoltan’s design for the Wallis Annenberg Center for the Performing Arts in Beverly Hills, California, was completed in mid-2014 although opening night was actually October 2013. The project is more commonly called the Wallis and Pali’s design work started back in 2006. It was honored by the California Preservation Foundation as part of the project includes the re-vitalization of a 1930s Post Office originally designed by Ralph C. Flewelling.

== Personal life ==
He is married to his partner Judy and they are the parents of two boys, Renzo and Ezra.
