= Moses Annenberg =

American newspaper publisher (1877 – 1942)

- Born: Moses Louis Annenberg; February 11, 1877; Kallwischken, East Prussia, German Empire
- Died: July 20, 1942 (aged 65); Mayo Clinic, Rochester, Minnesota, U.S.
- Occupation: Newspaper publisher
- Spouse: Sadie Cecilia Friedman (m. 1899)
- Children: 8, including Janet, Enid, and Walter
- Relatives: Wallis Annenberg (granddaughter); Lauren Bon (great-granddaughter)

Moses Louis Annenberg (February 11, 1877 – July 20, 1942) was an American newspaper publisher who owned the Daily Racing Form and the Philadelphia Inquirer. He also owned General News Bureau, a wire service that reported the results of horse races.

A German immigrant who rose from a newspaper boy to newspaper owner, he was the father of TV Guide creator Walter Annenberg.

== Early life ==
Moses Louis Annenberg was born in Kallwischken, a village in East Prussia (German Empire), the third of eleven children to Orthodox Jewish parents Sheva and Tobias Annenberg. Tobias was a merchant in nearby Insterburg, whose last name was assigned by local officials in 1871, under a decree by Wilhelm I making surnames a requirement for future census records. "Annenberg" was derived from Low German, as a colloquial spelling of "on am Berg" ("of the mountain"), in reference to their residence between two hills.

As a child, Annenberg was known as "Schwarzer Zigeuner" ("Black Gypsy") for his "dark complexion and penetrating eyes". His family was one of only seven with Jewish origins in Gumbinnen region, totalling under fifty people in Kreis Insterburg. At the storefront, travellers were mystified by Tobias Annenberg's daily morning prayer, complete with tallit and tefillin, and his refusal to touch lard, instead calling a non-Jewish cohabitant of the house to weigh and handle the fat for customers. A neighbouring blacksmith named Harder made a habit out of feuding with Annenberg's father and eldest brother Jakob, such as feeding Annenberg and his sister Eve pork sandwiches and dropping a ham hock into the family's well. When Harder was fined 10 mark by Prussian authorities after complaint by Insterburg's synagogue, he built a fence to block the road to the Annenberg house. Annenberg, who was a long-time friend of Harder's daughter, recalled this to be his first experience with antisemitism.

Due to growing concern regarding pogroms taking place in neighbouring Russia under Alexander III, Annenberg's father emigrated to the United States in 1882, settling in Chicago with plans to relocate his family there. Annenberg's eldest brother Jakob joined his father in 1883, the family had to subsist off hunting and fishing, undertaken by Annenberg and his elder siblings. They had to sell their residence to stay financially stable, moving to another village to live with Annenberg's eldest sister.

In 1885, the Annenberg family received enough money from their relatives in the U.S. to move out of the country. Annenberg, his mother, and nine other siblings boarded a train to Berlin before travelling over the Atlantic Ocean on a steamship as third-class steerage passengers. The family immigrated via Castle Garden, thus avoiding a $25 fee at Ellis Island that would have led to expulsion. After travelling to Illinois by train and a stop-over at a friend's house, the family arrived at their father's residence in Chicago's South Side.

== Career ==
Annenberg started out as a newsie hawking papers on the street with his older brother Max, with both becoming gang leaders during the Chicago circulation wars.

Gradually, Annenberg rose through the ranks, first as a newspaper salesman at the Chicago Tribune, later for the Hearst Corporation, which owned the Chicago American, the Chicago Examiner and the Chicago Herald, rising to circulation manager. Around 1900, he moved to Milwaukee's Yankee Hill neighborhood, from where he ran the Wisconsin News, as well as the publishing business M.L.A. Investment Co. Annenberg bought the Daily Racing Form in 1922 and The Philadelphia Inquirer in 1936. He also owned The New York Morning Telegraph, a broadsheet that was focused on entertainment and horse racing.

In the fall of 1934, Annenberg purchased the defunct Miami Beach Tribune, moved operations to Miami, and relaunched it as a tabloid called the Miami Tribune. In an asset swap involving cash, Annenberg sold it to John S. Knight, owner of the Miami Herald, for $600,000 and the Massillon Independent, a profitable newspaper based in Massillon, Ohio. The last edition was published on December 1, 1937, and then the Miami Tribune was absorbed by the Herald.

The assets of his publishing company, the Cecelia Corporation (named after his wife) became the foundation of Triangle Publications, which was created in 1942 by his son Walter to hold his and his sisters' inherited assets.

== Tax evasion case ==
During the Roosevelt administration, he was indicted for tax evasion on August 11, 1939, for income tax evasion for the years 1932–1936, totaling $3,258,809.97 in income taxes evaded. On April 4, 1940, Annenberg pleaded guilty to the 1936 income tax evasion count in the indictment that charged him with evading $1.2 million in taxes ($28.2 million today).

Judge James Herbert Wilkerson, the same judge who previously sentenced Al Capone, sentenced Annenberg to three years in prison and a fine of $8.0 million ($183.8 million today) "the largest single tax fraud penalty in history" at the time.

== Personal life ==
Annenberg married Sadie Cecillia Freedman (1879–1965) on August 20, 1899. They had one son, the publisher and philanthropist Walter Annenberg, and seven daughters; Diana Annenberg (1900–1905), Esther Annenberg Simon Levee (1901–1992), Janet Annenberg Kahn Neff Hooker (1904–1997), Enid Annenberg Haupt (1906–2005), Lita Annenberg Hazen (1909–1985), Evelyn Annenberg Jaffe Hall (1911–2005), and Harriet Beatrice Annenberg Ames Aronson (1914–1976).

== Death ==
Annenberg was released from Lewisburg Federal Penitentiary prison on June 3, 1942, and died at the Mayo Clinic on July 20, 1942, after having surgery for a brain tumor. His Ranch A in eastern Wyoming is now listed on the National Register of Historic Places.
