= Wallis Annenberg Center for the Performing Arts =

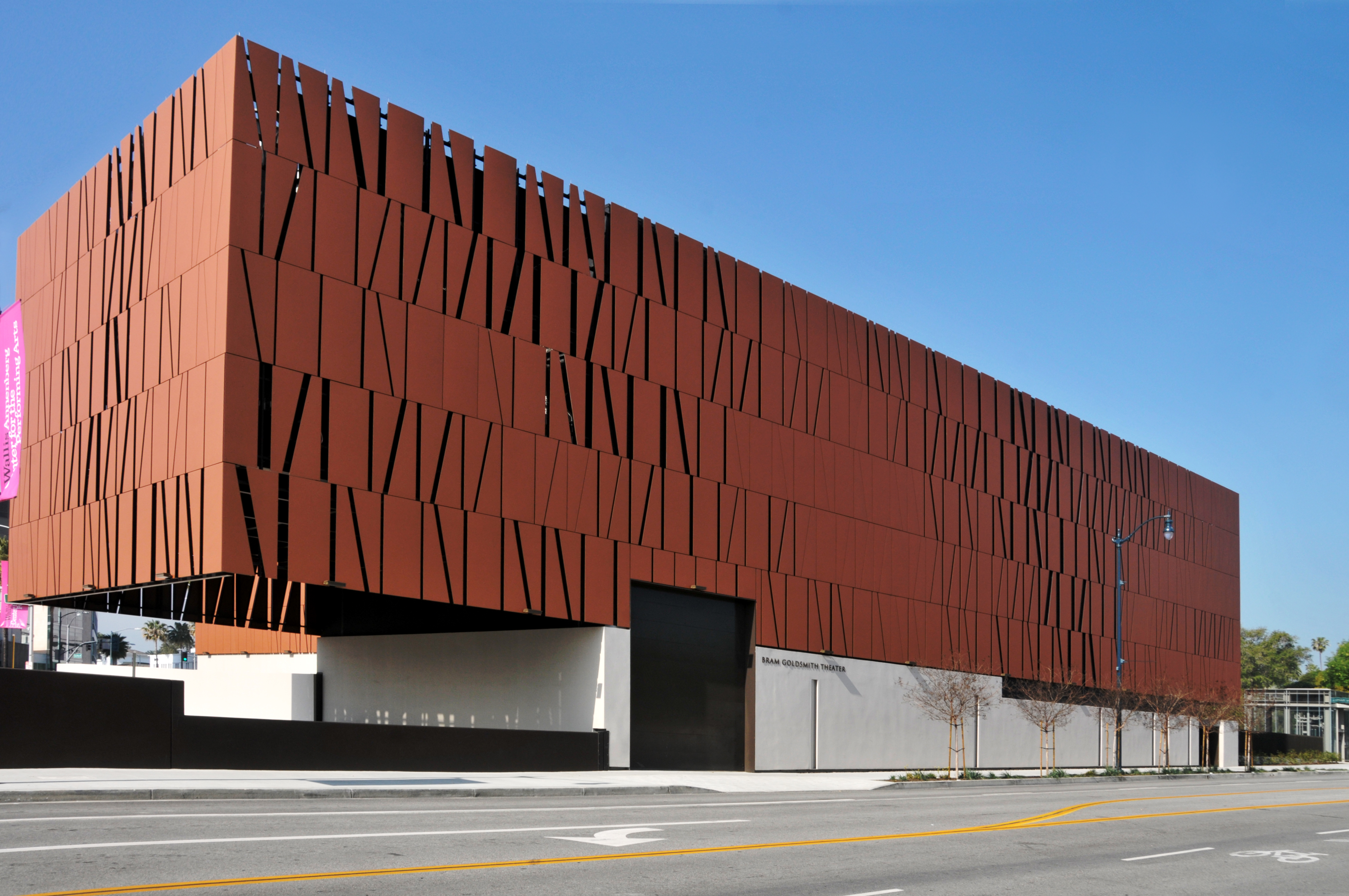

General information
- Status: Completed
- Location: Corner of North Santa Monica Boulevard and Crescent Drive, Beverly Hills, California
- Coordinates: 34.07228°N 118.40124°W
- Completed: 2013
- Operator: Robert Van Leer

Design and construction
- Architect: Zoltan Pali

The Wallis Annenberg Center for the Performing Arts, also known as The Wallis, is a community arts center in Beverly Hills, California, named for philanthropist and endower Wallis Annenberg

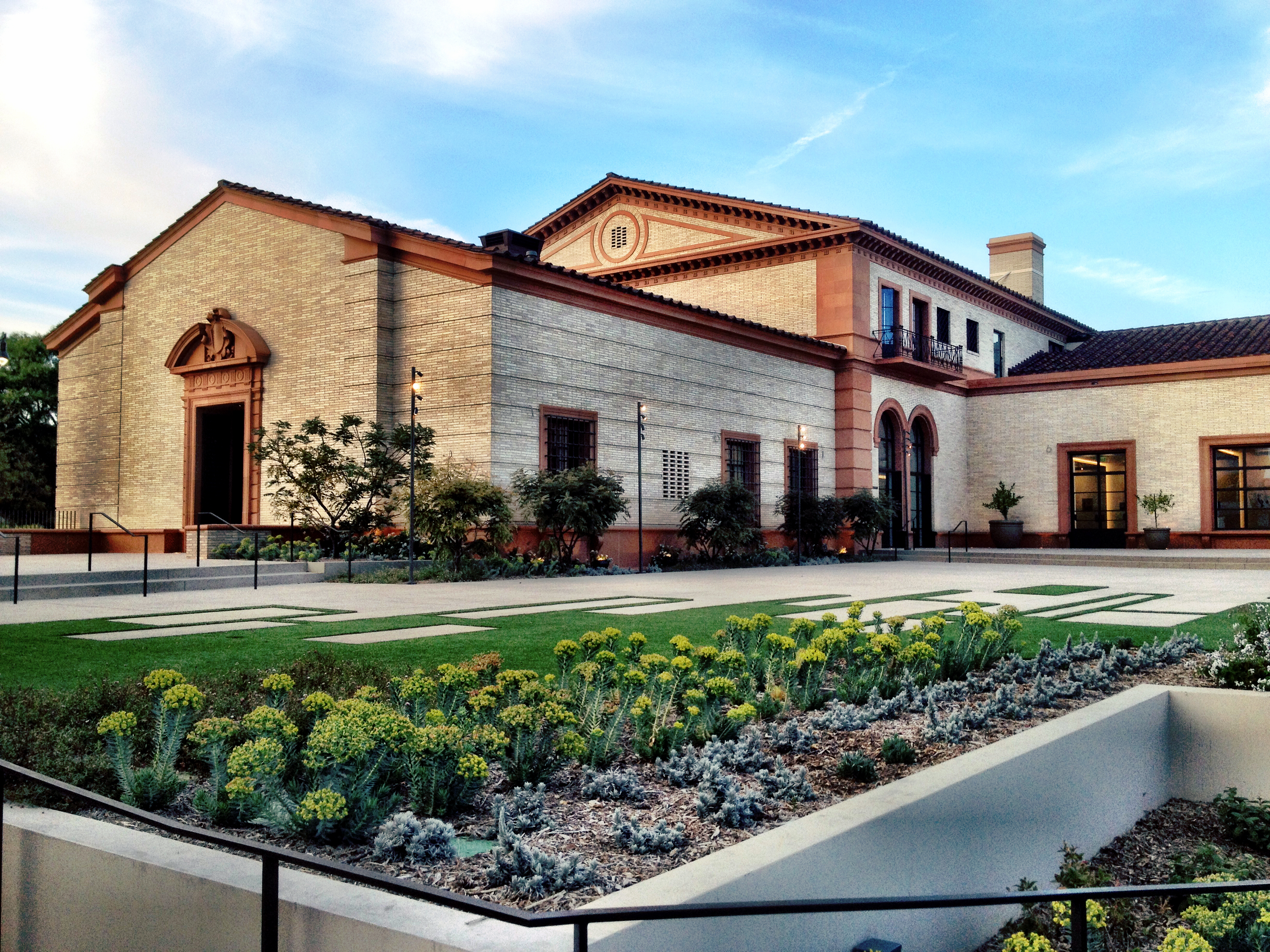
The restored Post Office portion of the Wallis Annenberg Center for the Performing Arts, as seen from the corner of South Santa Monica Boulevard and Canon Drive.

== Location ==
The Wallis is located on the corner of North Santa Monica Boulevard and Crescent Drive in Beverly Hills, California.

== Amenities ==
The center was designed by architect Zoltan Pali of SPF:architects. It includes the historic 1933 Beverly Hills post office, the newly built 500-seat Goldsmith Theater, the 150-seat Lovelace Studio Theater, GRoW at The Wallis: A Space for Arts Education, a sculpture garden and a promenade terrace designed by Ron Lutsko. The Goldsmith theater is named after Bram Goldsmith, the Chairman Emeritus of City National Bank. The restored landmark Beverly Hills post office is named for Paula Kent Meehan.

== History ==
Endowed by heiress and philanthropist Wallis Annenberg (born 1939), who donated US$25 million, The Wallis was under construction for ten years. The total cost of creating the center is estimated at $70 million, with an annual operating budget of several million dollars.

== Gallery ==
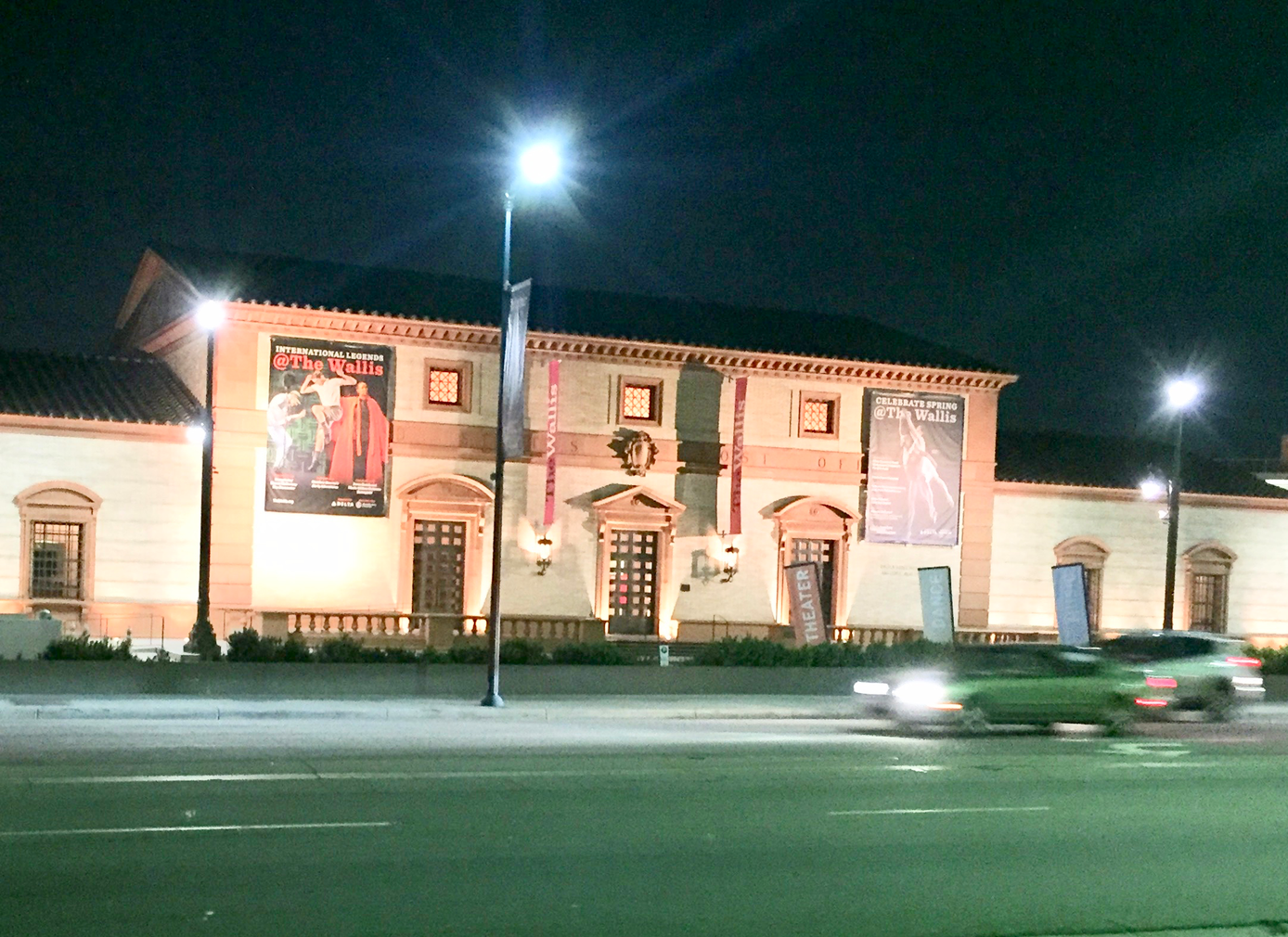
The Wallis at night.

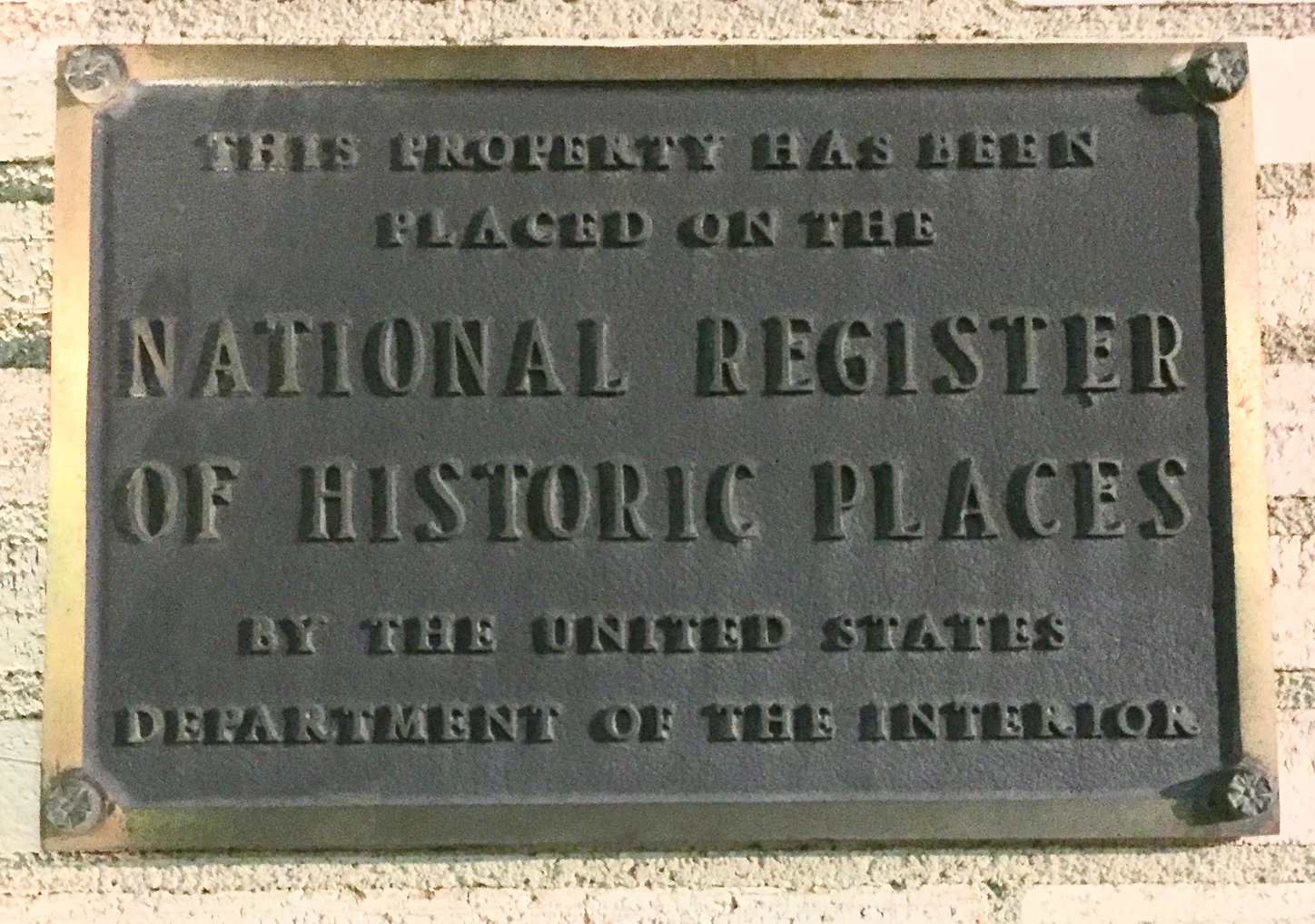
National Register plaque for the former post office.

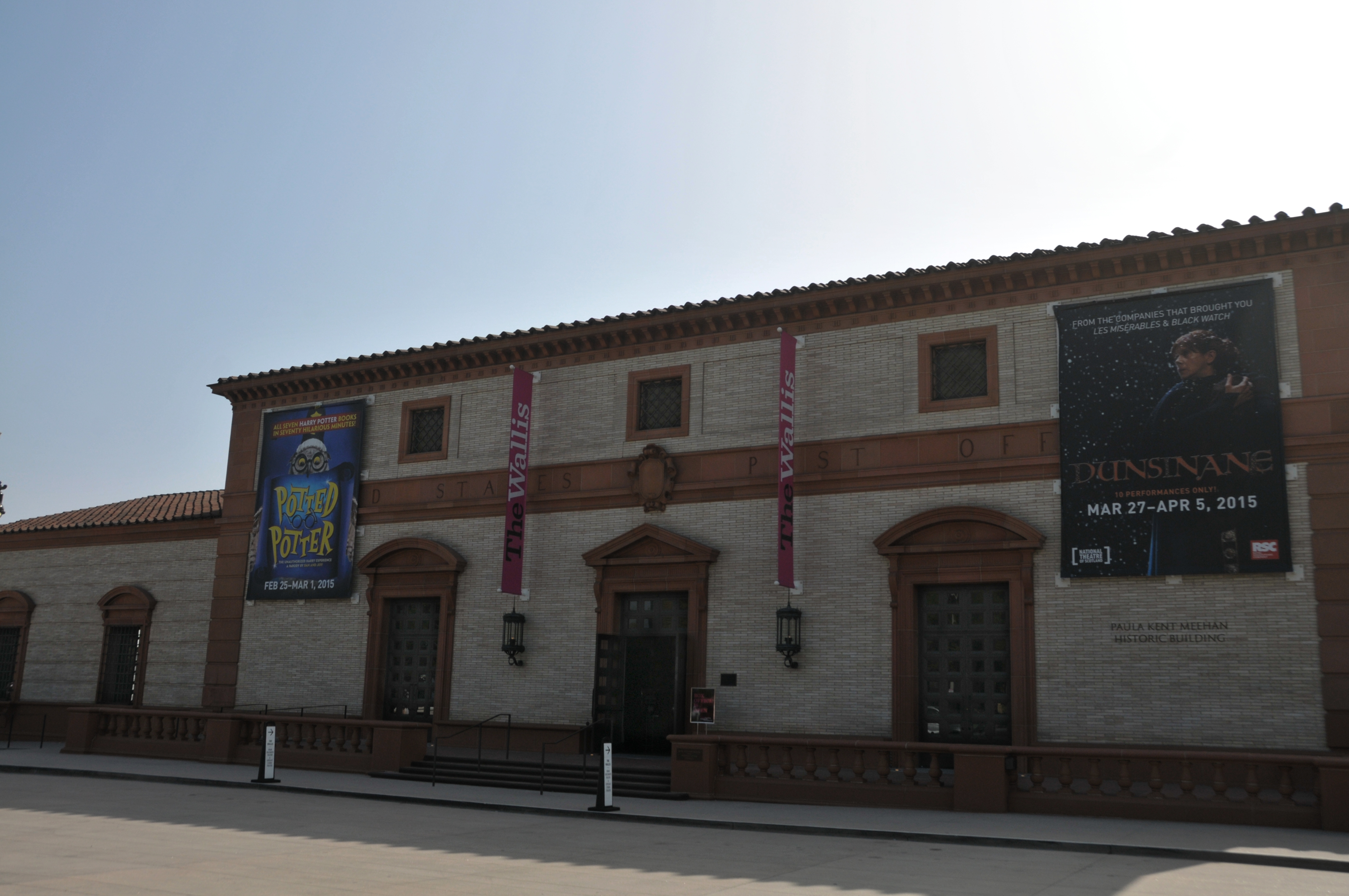
The 1933 Beverly Hills Post Office, now part of the Wallis.
