= Annenberg School for Communication =

Annenberg School for Communication may refer to the following in the United States:

- Annenberg School for Communication at the University of Pennsylvania
- USC Annenberg School for Communication and Journalism, in California
