= Walter Annenberg =

American businessman (1908–2002)

His Excellency Walter Annenberg KSG KBE
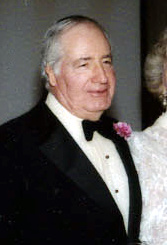
- Annenberg in 1982

United States Ambassador to the United Kingdom
- In office April 29, 1969 – October 30, 1974
- President: Richard Nixon; Gerald Ford
- Preceded by: David K. E. Bruce
- Succeeded by: Elliot Richardson

Personal details
- Born: March 13, 1908 Milwaukee, Wisconsin, U.S.
- Died: October 1, 2002 (aged 94) Wynnewood, Pennsylvania, U.S.
- Resting place: Sunnylands, Rancho Mirage, California; 33.776°N 116.412°W
- Spouses: Veronica Dunkelman (m. 1938; div. 1950); Leonore Cohn (m. 1951)
- Children: 2, including Wallis
- Parents: Moses Annenberg; Sadie Freedman
- Relatives: Janet Annenberg Hooker (sister); Enid Haupt (sister); Lauren Bon (granddaughter)
- Education: University of Pennsylvania
- Awards: Officier of Legion of Honour Presidential Medal of Freedom (1986) Knight Commander of the Order of the British Empire (1976) Knight of Order of St. Gregory the Great; Eisenhower Medal for Leadership and Service (1988); Linus Pauling Medal for Humanitarianism
- Website: annenberg.org

Walter Hubert Annenberg (March 13, 1908 – October 1, 2002) was an American businessman, investor, philanthropist, and diplomat. Annenberg owned and operated Triangle Publications, which included ownership of The Philadelphia Inquirer, TV Guide, the Daily Racing Form and Seventeen magazine. He was appointed by President Richard Nixon as United States Ambassador to the United Kingdom, where he served from 1969 to 1974.

During his tenure as U.S. ambassador to the United Kingdom, he developed a close friendship with Queen Elizabeth II and other members of the royal family. After initial perceived missteps, he came to be admired for his dedicated work ethic, his wife's lavish entertaining, and personal gifts to support patriotic British causes, such as the restoration of St. Paul's Cathedral in London. He also paid for the renovation of Winfield House, the American ambassador's residence.

In his later years, Annenberg became one of the most prominent philanthropists in the United States. He established the Annenberg Foundation in 1989, and gave over $2 billion to educational establishments and art galleries, including both the Annenberg School for Communication at the University of Pennsylvania and USC Annenberg School for Communication and Journalism in Los Angeles. At Sunnylands, his 220-acre (89 ha) estate near Palm Springs, California, he entertained royalty, presidents and other celebrities; it is now a museum and retreat center dedicated to furthering the Annenbergs' legacies.

== Early life ==
Walter Annenberg was born to a Jewish family in Milwaukee, Wisconsin, on March 13, 1908. He was the only son of Sadie Cecelia (née Friedman; 1879–1965) and Moses Annenberg, who published the Daily Racing Form and purchased The Philadelphia Inquirer in 1936. Annenberg was a stutterer since childhood.

He had seven sisters: Diana Annenberg (1900–1905), Esther Annenberg Simon Levee (1901–1992), Janet Annenberg Hooker (1904–1997), Enid Annenberg Bensinger Haupt (1906–2005), Lita Annenberg Hazen (1909–1995), Evelyn Annenberg Jaffe Hall (1911–2005), and Harriet Beatrice Annenberg Ames Aronson (1914–1969).

The Annenberg family moved to Long Island, New York, in 1920. Walter attended the Peddie School in Hightstown, New Jersey, where he graduated in 1927. He was admitted to the Wharton School at the University of Pennsylvania in Philadelphia, but dropped out without attaining a degree. While in college, he was a member of Zeta Beta Tau, a traditionally Jewish fraternity.

Annenberg was greatly affected by the tax evasion charges and other scandals involving his father in the 1930s. A significant part of his adult life was dedicated to rehabilitating the family's name through philanthropy and public service.

== Business career ==
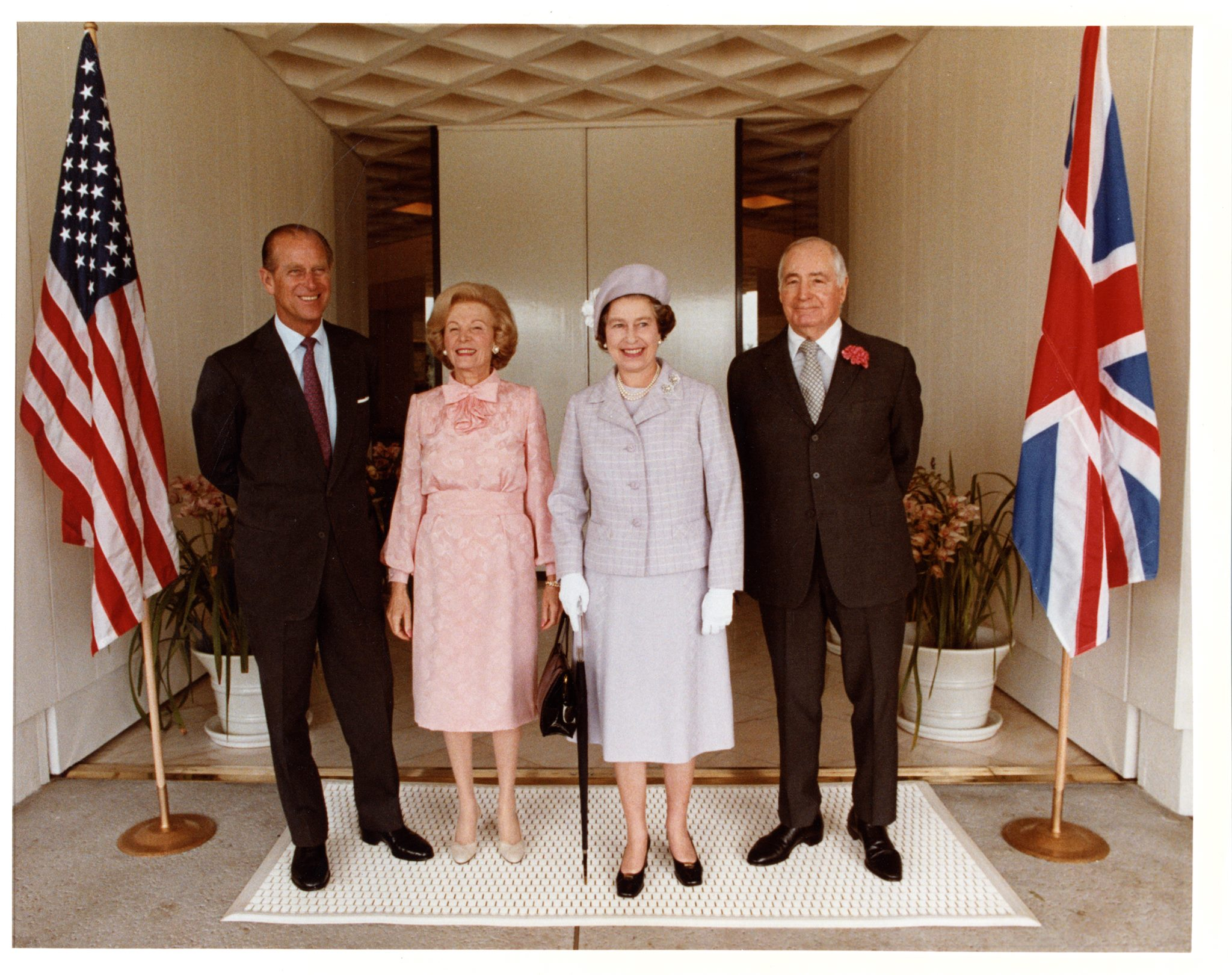
The Annenbergs with Queen Elizabeth II and Prince Philip at their home, Sunnylands, in Rancho Mirage, California, in 1983

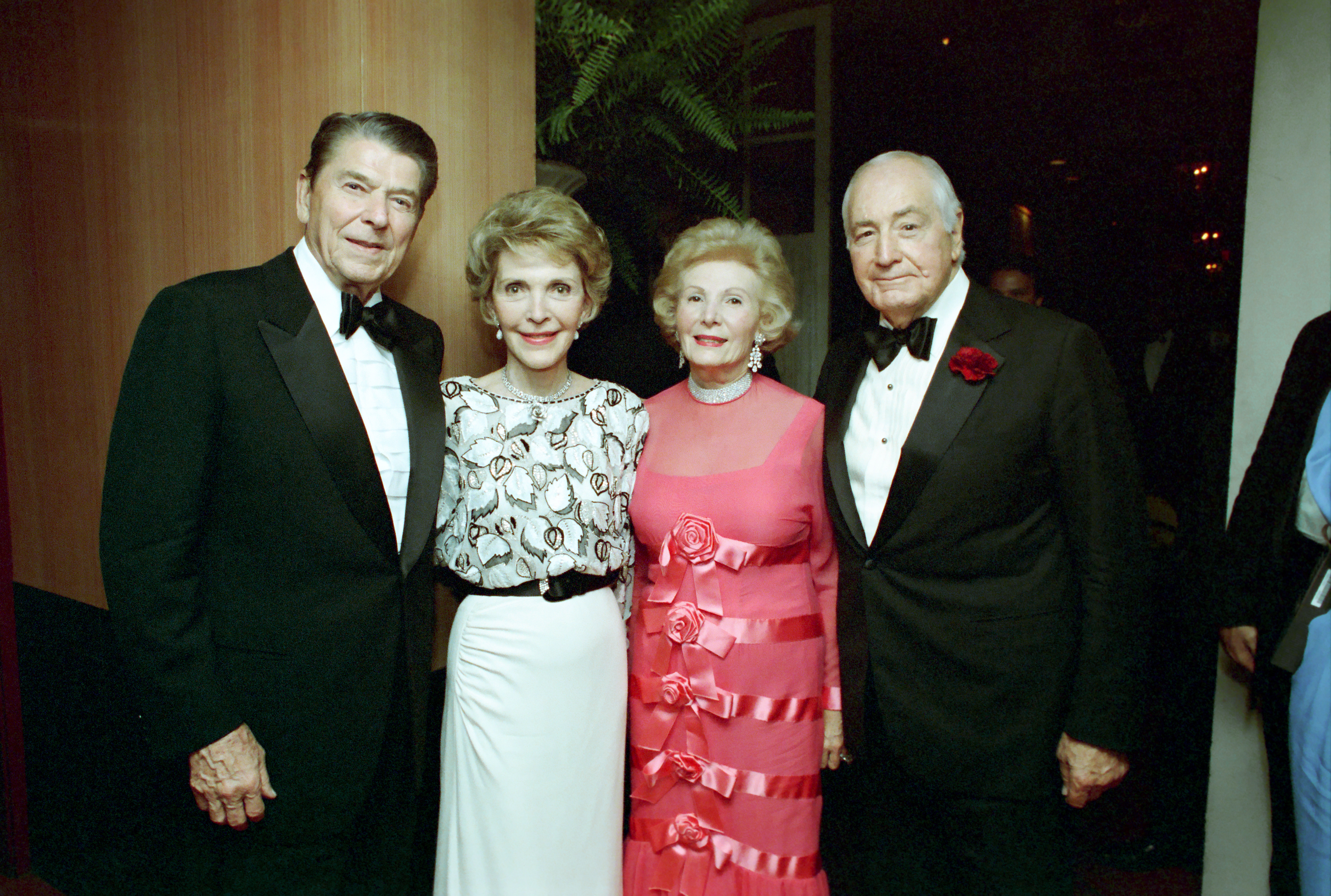
Leonore and Walter Annenberg with President Ronald Reagan and Mrs. Reagan in 1988

After his father's death in 1942, Annenberg took over the family businesses, making successes out of some that had been failing. He bought additional print media as well as radio and television stations, resulting in great success. One of his most prominent successes was the creation of TV Guide in 1952, which he started against the advice of his financial advisors. He also created Seventeen magazine. During the 1970s, TV Guide was making profits in the range of $600,000 to $1,000,000 per week.

While Annenberg ran his publishing empire as a business, he was not afraid to use it for his political purposes. One of his publications, The Philadelphia Inquirer, was influential in ridding Philadelphia of its largely corrupt city government in 1949. It campaigned for the Marshall Plan following World War II and attacked McCarthyism in the 1950s.

In 1966, Annenberg used the Inquirer to cast doubt on the candidacy of Democrat Milton Shapp for governor of Pennsylvania. Shapp was highly critical of the proposed merger of the Pennsylvania Railroad with the New York Central Railroad and was pushing the US Interstate Commerce Commission to prevent it from occurring. Annenberg, who was the biggest individual stockholder of the Pennsylvania Railroad, wanted to see the merger succeed (which it did) and he was frustrated with Shapp's opposition. During a press conference, an Inquirer reporter asked Shapp if he had ever been a patient in a mental hospital. Never having been in one, Shapp simply said "no." The next day, a five-column front page Inquirer headline read, "Shapp Denies Mental Institution Stay". Shapp and others have attributed his loss of the election to Annenberg's newspaper.

At a time when Annenberg was seeking appointment as U.S. ambassador to Great Britain, a TV Guide "special editorial" of April 14, 1969, suddenly reversed what had been the publication's support of the Smothers Brothers in the duo's content fight with their network, CBS. The editorial, "Smothers Out: A Wise Decision," praised the network cancellation of The Smothers Brothers Comedy Hour, rhetorically asking "Where does satire end -- and sacrilege begin?" Annenberg received the ambassadorship from President Richard Nixon, who at the time was a frequent target of Smothers Brothers on-air barbs and was pressing for more control over television network content.

Even while an active businessman, Annenberg had an interest in public service. In 1953 he became one of the founding trustees of Eisenhower Fellowships. After Richard M. Nixon was elected president, he appointed Annenberg as ambassador to the Court of St James's in the UK. In 1969, under pressure after the Shapp controversy, Annenberg sold The Inquirer and the Philadelphia Daily News, which he bought in 1957, to Knight Newspapers for $55 million. After being appointed as ambassador, he became quite popular in Britain, being made an Honorary Bencher of the Middle Temple on 26 November 1969 and an honorary Knight Commander of the Order of the British Empire (KBE) in 1976.

Annenberg led a lavish lifestyle. His Sunnylands winter estate in Rancho Mirage, California (near Palm Springs), hosted gatherings with such people as President Ronald Reagan and First Lady Nancy Reagan, Queen Elizabeth II, Frank Sinatra, Bob Hope, Bing Crosby, Charles, Prince of Wales, and the family of Mohammad Reza Pahlavi. Annenberg introduced President Reagan to British Prime Minister Margaret Thatcher, and the Reagans often celebrated New Year's Eve with the Annenbergs. President Ronald Reagan named Leonore Annenberg the State Department's Chief of Protocol in early 1981. Sunnylands covers 400 acres (1.6 km^{2}), guard-gated on a 650-acre (2.6 km^{2}) parcel surrounded by a stucco wall at the northwest corner of Frank Sinatra Drive and Bob Hope Drive; the property includes a golf course. The estate continues to be used for meetings and retreats by prominent people.

Annenberg served on the advisory board of U.S. English, an organization that supports making English the official language of the United States. He became a champion of public television, receiving many awards, including the Golden Plate Award of the American Academy of Achievement in 1985, the Presidential Medal of Freedom from President Reagan in 1986, the Linus Pauling Medal for Humanitarianism, the 1988 Eisenhower Medal for Leadership and Service, was made a Knight of the Order of St. Gregory the Great in 1998, and was named an Officer of the French Legion of Honor. He was elected a member of the American Philosophical Society in 1990 and a Fellow of the American Academy of Arts and Sciences in 1995.

Annenberg sold Triangle Publications (TV Guide, Daily Racing Form and a few other publications) to Australian publishing magnate Rupert Murdoch in 1988 for $3 billion (a record media price at the time), announcing that he would devote his life to philanthropy.

His collection of French impressionist art was valued at approximately US$1 billion in 1991 and was donated to the Metropolitan Museum of Art in New York City upon his death in 2002. In 1990, he donated $50 million to the United Negro College Fund which was the largest amount ever contributed to the organization. He was also a member of the Founding Council of the Rothermere American Institute at Oxford University, helping to raise funds for the institute's building and library.

Annenberg was named Broadcast Pioneers of Philadelphia's Person of the Year in 1983 and was inducted into the Broadcast Pioneers of Philadelphia Hall of Fame in 1992.

In 1995, he received the S. Roger Horchow Award for Greatest Public Service by a Private Citizen, one of the Jefferson Awards for Public Service, given out annually by the American Institute for Public Service.

== Philanthropy ==
During his lifetime, it is estimated that Annenberg donated over $2 billion. He once said that "education... holds civilization together". Many school buildings, libraries, theaters, hospitals, and museums across the United States now bear his name.

Annenberg established the Annenberg School for Communication at the University of Pennsylvania and the Annenberg School for Communication and Journalism at the University of Southern California. In 1993, he donated $100 million to the Peddie School, the largest donation ever to a school when accounting for inflation.

In the early 1980s, Annenberg founded the Annenberg Center for Health Sciences at Eisenhower in Rancho Mirage, California. In the mid-1980s, he established the Annenberg Fellowship to Eton College, a one-year fellowship for one US graduating college senior (chosen from a rotating list of US universities including Duke, Harvard, Penn, Princeton, Yale, and others) to spend a year teaching and serving as a cultural ambassador to the famous British boys' school. In 1989, he established the Annenberg Foundation, and 1993, created the Annenberg Challenge, a US$500 million, five-year reform effort and the largest single gift ever made to American public education.

== Personal life ==
In 1939, Annenberg married Bernice Veronica Dunkelman. Bernice was raised in a Jewish family in Canada, the daughter of Canadian businessman David Dunkelman who was known for mass-producing low-cost suits and selling them at a single price of $14 at his chain of 65 retail stores. They divorced in 1950 after eleven years together. While married, Dunkelman and Annenberg had two children: a daughter, Wallis, and son, Roger. Roger died by suicide in 1962; to commemorate his death, Harvard University, where Roger was a student at the time, now has a Roger Annenberg Hall named in his honor.

In 1951, Annenberg married Leonore "Lee" Cohn. Lee was a niece of Harry Cohn, the founder and president of Columbia Pictures. Although of Jewish ethnicity, she was raised a Christian Scientist by her uncle's wife. Despite being born to Jewish families, the Annenbergs were not practitioners of Judaism; they regularly celebrated Easter and Christmas with family and friends. In 1993 Leonore and Walter Annenberg were awarded the National Medal of Arts.

== Death ==
Annenberg died at his home in Wynnewood, Pennsylvania, on October 1, 2002, from complications of pneumonia; he was 94 years old. He was survived by his wife, Leonore (February 20, 1918 – March 12, 2009); his daughter, Wallis; and two sisters, Enid A. Haupt and Evelyn Hall. Including those by his wife's daughters from her first two marriages (Diane Deshong and Elizabeth Kabler), he left seven grandchildren and six great-grandchildren.

Diplomatic posts
Preceded by David K. E. Bruce	U.S. Ambassador to the United Kingdom; 1969–1974	Succeeded by Elliot Richardson
