= Enid A. Haupt =

American philanthropist (1906–2005)

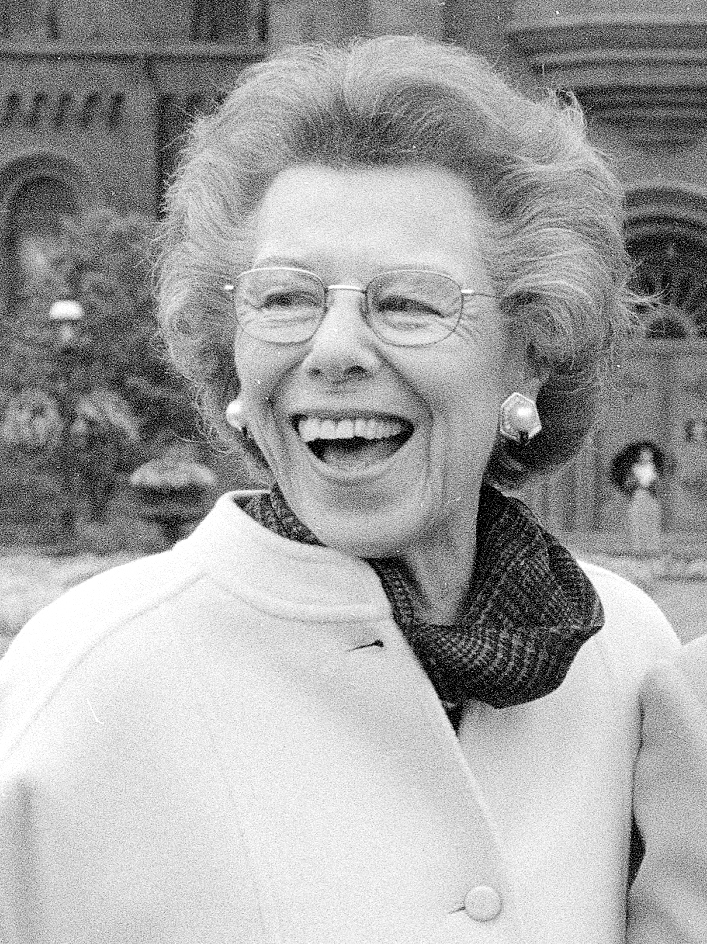
Haupt at the Smithsonian Institution, 1988

Enid Haupt (née Annenberg, formerly Bensinger; May 13, 1906 – October 25, 2005) was an American publisher and philanthropist whose gifts supported horticulture, the arts, architectural and historic preservation, and cancer research. She has been described as "the greatest patron American horticulture has ever known" by Gregory Long, the president of the New York Botanical Garden.

== Early life and education ==
Haupt was born in Chicago to Sadie Cecilia (née Friedman) and Moses Annenberg, the Jewish founder of a publishing empire based on The Daily Racing Form and The Philadelphia Inquirer. She was fourth of eight children and last surviving child (seven girls and a boy) born to the couple; the boy was Walter H. Annenberg, who was to become a publisher and philanthropist in his own right. One of her sisters was philanthropist Janet Annenberg Hooker. She grew up in Milwaukee.

She was tall and thin as a young girl, and resolved to impress her older sisters by memorizing a new word each day. She attended Mount Ida Seminary in Newton, Massachusetts, during which time her family moved to New York. Her father was convicted of tax evasion during the 1930s. and sentenced to two years in prison; he died before the end of his sentence.

== Career ==
In 1953, she was charged with publishing the magazine Seventeen, a post she held until 1970. She also wrote "Young Living", a syndicated fashion, beauty and lifestyle column.

Haupt's first marriage, to Norman Emil Bensinger ended in divorce; they had one child, Pamela Enid Bensinger (later Mrs. Nusbaum, later Mrs. Allen; 1929—1997), who predeceased her mother. Enid later married Ira Haupt, who died in 1963. During her second marriage, she became involved with gardening, including growing flowers, after she encouraged her husband to help his gardeners find better jobs.

== Philanthropic legacy ==
Haupt is quoted as often having said "Nature is my religion," and once told The New York Times "Books are the most important things in my life besides nature." As an heiress to a family fortune, she was able to make significant contributions to her personal causes and interests, foremost among which was horticulture.

Haupt contributed the Haupt Fountains at the Ellipse located between the White House and the Washington Monument, and also a four-acre Victorian garden, known as the Enid A. Haupt Garden, on the south side of the Smithsonian Institution Building ("The Castle"). The Garden's architect, Jean Paul Carlihan, intended the Garden to interpret nearby museums. The Garden is situated atop the underground portions of the Quadrangle building, which includes the National Museum of African Art, the Arthur M. Sackler Gallery (Asian art), and the S. Dillon Ripley Center. Accordingly, the end of the Garden nearest the African Art museum contains a modern interpretation of an Islamic garden, and the end nearest the Sackler Gallery is accented with pink granite moongates.

She donated the funds for the American Horticultural Society to purchase River Farm, a 27-acre plantation, located near Mount Vernon and once owned by George Washington. A Victorian style conservatory located in the New York Botanical Garden was saved from demolition through her efforts and funding. She spent large sums over the years to maintain the gardens of The Cloisters, part of the Metropolitan Museum of Art. She contributed to the garden of Claude Monet in Giverny, France, and to Lady Bird Johnson's National Wildflower Research Center.

Among her other contributions are works of art for the Metropolitan Museum of Art and the National Gallery of Art, and funding for the Memorial Sloan-Kettering Cancer Center. According to The New York Times, "The gift that gave her the most satisfaction, she said, was one of her earliest and least heralded: the Enid A. Haupt Glass Garden, a playground for children who are patients at the Rusk Institute of Rehabilitation Medicine at New York University Medical Center."

== Death ==
Enid Haupt died at age 99 at her home in Greenwich, Connecticut.
