= Janet Annenberg Hooker =

American philanthropist

Janet Annenberg Hooker (formerly Kahn and Neff; October 13, 1904 – December 13, 1997) was an American philanthropist.

== Life ==
She was born in Chicago to Sadie Cecilia (née Friedman) and Moses Annenberg; Moses was the founder of a publishing empire based on The Daily Racing Form and The Philadelphia Inquirer. She was one of eight children (seven girls and a boy) born to the couple; two of the other children were Enid A. Haupt and Walter H. Annenberg.

She contributed $5 million of the $10 million cost of the Janet Annenberg Hooker Hall of Geology, Gems and Minerals, which opened in 1997, and which is the most comprehensive earth sciences complex of its kind. It is part of the National Museum of Natural History. The Hope Diamond is one of the gems on permanent display there.

Her first gift to the National Museum of Natural History was the Hooker Emerald Brooch, which she donated to them in 1977, when it was valued at US$500,000. (She had purchased the brooch from Tiffany & Co. in 1955 for an undisclosed price.) She later gave the museum the Hooker Starburst Diamonds.

She was married three times: first in 1924 to publisher L. Stanley Kahn (divorced 1937), then in 1938 to investment banker Joseph A. Neff (died 1969), and lastly in 1974 to James Stewart Hooker, head of labor relations for The Philadelphia Inquirer (died 1976).
