= Annenberg Foundation =

American charitable family foundation

- Founded: July 1, 1989 (section 509(a)(3) organization)
- Founder: Walter H. Annenberg
- Type: Non-operating private foundation (IRS exemption status): 501(c)(3)
- Purpose: Arts, Education, Health and Human Services, Animal services and Civic responsibility
- Headquarters: Los Angeles, California, U.S.
- Coordinates: 34°03′30″N 118°24′56″W
- Region served: United States
- Owner: Wallis Annenberg
- Key people: Wallis Annenberg; Lauren Bon; Gregory Annenberg Weingarten; Charles Annenberg Weingarten
- Website: annenberg.org

The Annenberg Foundation is an American foundation that provides funding and support to non-profit organizations.

== Overview ==
The Annenberg Foundation was established by Walter H. Annenberg in 1989 with $1.2 billion, one-third of the assets from the sale of Annenberg's Triangle Publications.

The Annenberg Foundation is a grantmaking institution that has provided money towards educational programming, environmental stewardship, social justice, and animal welfare.

As of 2021, the foundation has $1.59 billion in assets.

== Ownership and board of directors ==
Walter H. Annenberg headed the Annenberg Foundation until his death in 2002. Leonore Annenberg, his wife, ran it until her death in March 2009. Since then, the foundation's trusteeship was led by Walter's daughter Wallis Annenberg and three of her children: Lauren Bon, Gregory Annenberg Weingarten, and Charles Annenberg Weingarten. Wallis Annenberg died in July 2025.

== The Ballona Wetlands restoration project ==
On January 28, 2013, the Annenberg Foundation signed a Memorandum of Understanding with the California Department of Fish and Wildlife and several other state agencies to explore the possibility of constructing a 46,000 square foot facility in the protected Ballona Wetlands Ecological Reserve which would have included adoption and veterinary services for domestic pets. However, on December 2, the Foundation announced that it was suspending its plans. The Los Angeles Times reported that some wetlands advocates had opposed the proposal. The Los Angeles Daily News noted that this was the Foundation's second failed attempt to construct this project on public land. The Los Angeles Times and Los Angeles Daily News editorial boards called the project "a bad fit" and "inappropriate," respectively.
