= Katleman =

Katleman is a surname. Notable people with the surname include:

- Beldon Katleman (1914–1988), American businessman
- Beth Katleman (born 1959), American artist
- Michael Katleman (fl. from 1985), American director and producer
