= Refill =

Refill may refer to:

- Free refill, a drink that can be filled again, free of charge, after being consumed
- Refill (campaign), British environmental campaign
- "Refill" (song), 2012 song by Elle Varner
- Relapse: Refill, 2009 album by Eminem
- Refill paper, an alternate term for loose leaf

== See also ==
- Capillary refill, medical term
- Toner refill, refilling of laser printer toner cartridges
- Refil (disambiguation)
