= Clarissa Kaye =

Australian actress (1931–1994)

- Born: Clarissa Knipe; 2 August 1931; Sydney, New South Wales, Australia
- Died: 21 July 1994 (aged 62); Sydney, New South Wales, Australia
- Other name: Clarissa Kaye-Mason
- Occupation: Actress
- Spouse: James Mason (m. 1971; died 1984)

Clarissa Kaye (2 August 1931 – 21 July 1994) was an Australian stage, film and television actress. She was the second wife (1971–1984) of the British actor James Mason. After her marriage, she was often known as Clarissa Kaye-Mason.

== Biography ==
Clarissa Kaye was born as Clarissa Knipe in Sydney in 1931. In 1958 she became one of a class of informal students of Hayes Gordon, who taught "The Method" (the group included Reg Livermore and Jon Ewing). Their first public performances were a series of one-act plays by Tennessee Williams. The group later became the Ensemble Theatre, Sydney's first theatre in the round and its longest established professional theatre company. In April-June 1962 two archetypical roles were hers in Melbourne at the Russell Street Theatre (later the Melbourne Theatre Company) in The Shifting Heart and The Summer of the Seventeenth Doll. Her finding of character particularly as Olive in The Doll can still evoke nostalgia.

In 1968, the Australian Broadcasting Commission produced a 45-minute location-filmed adaptation of the Henry Lawson short story of The Drover's Wife, directed by Gian Carlo Manara and featuring Kaye in the titular role. She also appeared in an episode of Adventure Unlimited.

Her first feature film role was as Meg in Age of Consent (1969), in which she appeared in scenes with James Mason, including a sex scene that was censored from Columbia Pictures' UK and U.S. releases. The following year she played the mother to Mick Jagger's Ned Kelly.

Kaye was attracted to Mason and later tracked him down. She wrote to Mason reminding him of their meeting and their sex scene in Age of Consent, and he wrote back. A correspondence between the two followed, and Kaye fuelled the relationship by travelling long distance to meet him.

== Marriage ==
Mason and Kaye were married on 8 August 1971 in Corseaux-sur-Vevey, Switzerland, and remained together until his death in 1984. (It has been reported that it was her second marriage.) Kaye, by no means an international performer of Mason's stellar attraction, reportedly was willing to put her career on hold, but Mason often had her cast in several of his productions. They shared scenes in Frankenstein: The True Story (1973); they also both appeared in Salem's Lot (1979), but shared no scenes together.

They appeared on Broadway in April 1979 in Brian Friel's play Faith Healer, but were never on stage together (the play is constructed as four monologues by three characters). Her involvement in Faith Healer was also largely at Mason's request, but she struggled with both the role and José Quintero's direction. Ed Flanders eventually left the play, refusing to work with Kaye, and the production ended after only 17 days.

== Death ==
James Mason died in 1984. Clarissa Kaye died a decade later, aged 62, on 21 July 1994 from cancer. Before Mason remarried, his children Portland and Morgan (both from his first marriage to Pamela Mason), were to be the beneficiaries of his estate, valued at £15 million. Mason changed his will, making Kaye his sole beneficiary, but the children understood from a letter he wrote to them that they would receive the proceeds after their stepmother's death. Kaye, however, was on such bad terms with the children that she cut them out of all photos with Mason.

Disregarding Mason's letter, Kaye left the entire estate to an unidentified trust rumoured to be on behalf of the Sathya Sai Organization; the organization neither confirmed nor denied this.

Mason's ashes were also a subject of controversy. Kaye initially had them in an urn in her home before depositing them in a bank vault. Mason's children tracked down the ashes after Kaye's death, took legal action to inter them, and the court ruled that his children had the right to choose the wording on their father's gravestone.

== Filmography ==
=== Film ===
- The Schoolmistress (1967 TV movie)
- The Drover's Wife (1968 TV movie) - lead role
- Age of Consent (1969) - Meg
- Adam's Woman (1970) - Matron
- Ned Kelly (1970) - Ellen Kelly
- The Yin and the Yang of Mr. Go (1970) - Zelda
- Frankenstein: The True Story (1973 TV movie) - Lady Fanshawe
- The MacKintosh Man (1973) - Guest at Reception (uncredited)
- The Umbrella Woman (aka The Good Wife) (1987) - Mrs. Jackson
- The First Kangaroos (1988 TV movie) - Mrs Messenger

=== Television ===
- Skippy the Bush Kangaroo (1969, Season 2, episode 64)
- Salem's Lot (1979 miniseries) - Marjorie Glick
- The Mike Walsh Show (1979) (TV series, 1 episode) Guest as herself.
- Dr. Fischer of Geneva (aka The Bomb Party) (1985) - Mrs. Montgomery
- The Last Resort (1988 miniseries)
- Bangkok Hilton (1989 miniseries) - Mrs. Cameron (final appearance)
