= El Rancho Vegas =

Historic hotel and casino in Nevada, United States

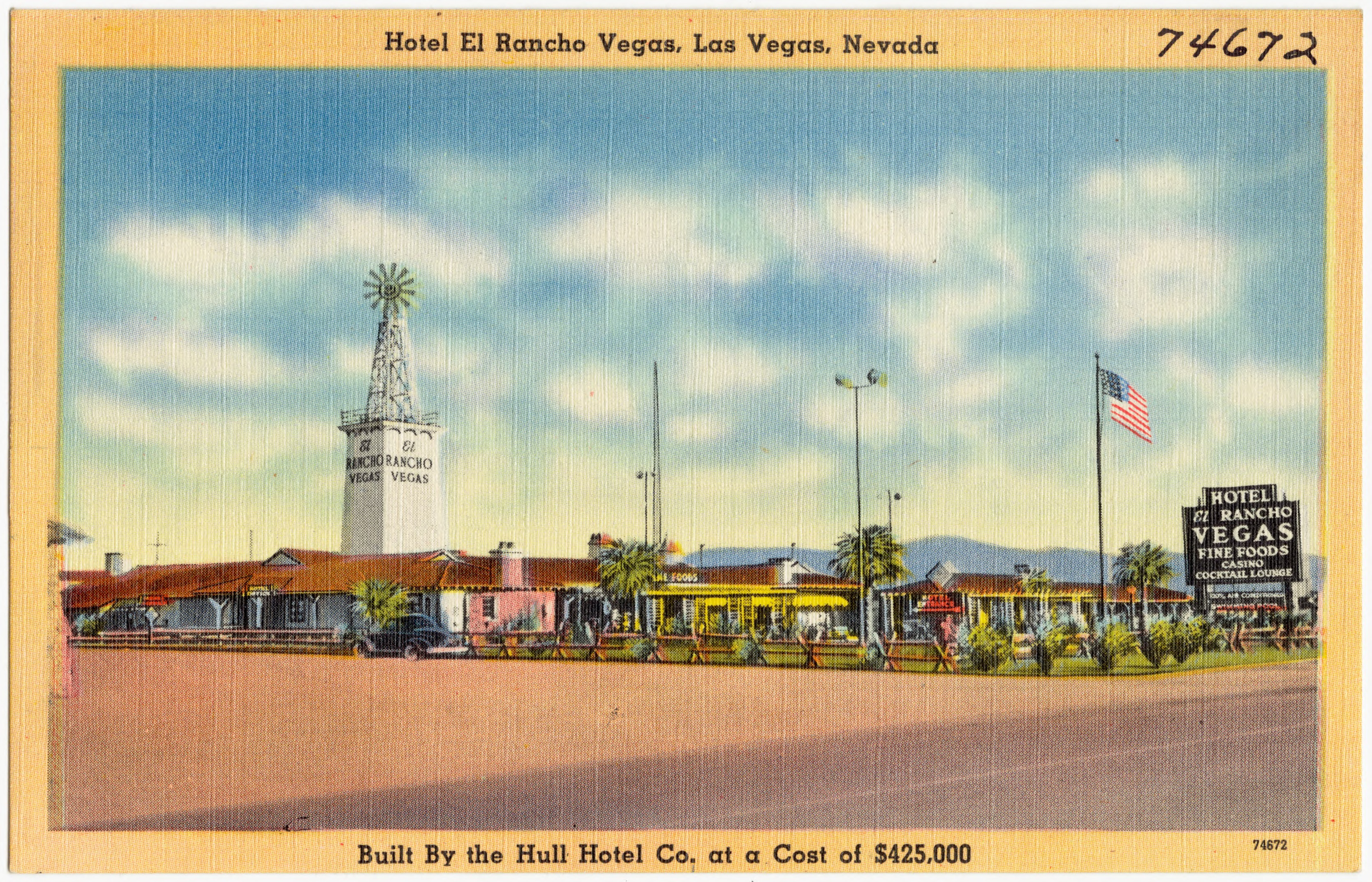
- El Rancho Vegas postcard, 1940s

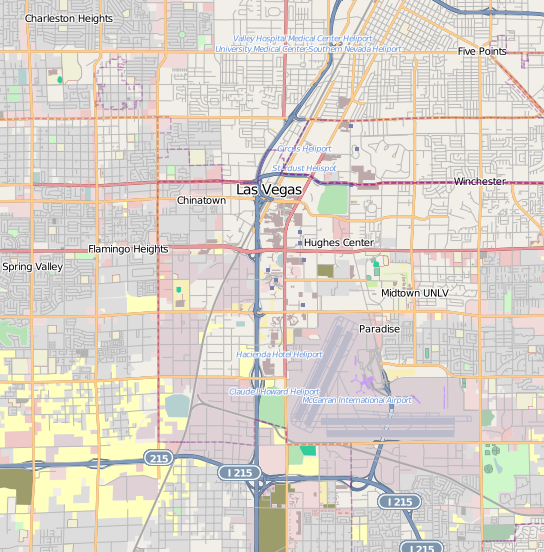
- Location within Las Vegas Boulevard Location within Nevada
- Interactive map of El Rancho Vegas
- Location: Winchester, Nevada; 36°08′29″N 115°09′38″W
- Opened: April 3, 1941
- Closed: June 17, 1960; 66 years ago (as El Rancho Vegas)
- Theme: Old West
- No. of rooms: 65 (1941); 222 (1960)
- Signature attractions: Opera House
- Notable restaurants: Stage Door Steak House; Chuck Wagon; Opera House
- Casino type: Land-based
- Owner: Thomas Hull (original owner); Joseph Drown (1940s); Wilbur Clark (1944–46); Beldon Katleman (1950–70); Howard Hughes (final owner)
- Architect: Wayne McAllister
- Renovated in: 1951, 1953, 1964

El Rancho Vegas was a hotel and casino at the north end of the Las Vegas Strip in Winchester, Nevada. It opened in 1941, as the first resort on the Strip, known then as part of Highway 91. It was located at what is now the southwest corner of Las Vegas Boulevard and Sahara Avenue. The El Rancho Vegas was conceived by Thomas Hull, who owned several hotels in California and wanted to expand his operations to Las Vegas. He decided to build his new resort along Highway 91, on desert land located just outside of city limits. Hull intended to target motorists traveling from Los Angeles to Las Vegas, although his remote location was met with skepticism.

The El Rancho Vegas was designed by Wayne McAllister, and originally included 65 rooms, located in cottage bungalows spread across the hotel's property. The El Rancho opened on April 3, 1941, with an Old West theme. It proved to be a success, which prompted the opening of other resorts on Highway 91, eventually transforming it into the Las Vegas Strip. The El Rancho underwent several ownership changes and was leased in 1948 to a group that included Jake Katleman. When he died in 1950, his nephew, Beldon Katleman, took over ownership. The El Rancho added an all-you-can-eat buffet in the 1940s, popularizing the buffet concept in Las Vegas. The El Rancho property was also home to the KENO radio station in the 1940s, and the KSHO-TV television station in the 1950s.

On June 17, 1960, a fire destroyed the El Rancho's main building, which housed the casino, restaurants, and showroom. The cause of the fire was never determined. The El Rancho closed as a result of the incident, although the cottages were left unharmed, leaving 222 rooms intact. In the early 1960s, the Thunderbird resort, located across the street, leased 88 of the El Rancho's rooms and operated them under the name Thunderbird West. The cottages were then leased in 1964 to another company, which rebranded them as El Rancho Vegas Motor Inn. It struggled as a non-gaming motel, and Katleman put the property up for sale in the late 1960s, eventually selling it to businessman Howard Hughes in 1970. Most of the remaining bungalows were demolished by the end of the decade, although a few were relocated to Old Vegas, an amusement park near Henderson, Nevada. Another El Rancho guest bungalow was moved to Pahrump, Nevada.

The former El Rancho Vegas property sat vacant for several decades after the Hughes purchase, eventually becoming one of the last large, undeveloped parcels on the Las Vegas Strip. Numerous projects were proposed for the land but did not materialize. A timeshare resort, the Hilton Grand Vacations Club, eventually opened on the southern edge of the property in 2004. MGM Mirage purchased the remaining acreage in 2007, and eventually opened its Festival Grounds on the property in 2015.

The Thunderbird was eventually renamed as the El Rancho Hotel and Casino in 1982, after the original El Rancho resort.

== History ==
Thomas Hull operated several California lodging establishments in the 1930s, including two motel properties that used the "El Rancho" name. In 1939, Hull bought the property for El Rancho Vegas from the estate of Leigh Hunt, owner of thousands of acres in Las Vegas, including what would become the upper Las Vegas Strip. Since the opening of U.S. Route 91, connecting Southern California and Las Vegas, the road had become increasingly busy with tourist traffic. Hull selected this site after scouting other locations in and around Las Vegas.

The property was located at what would later become the southwest corner of Las Vegas Boulevard and Sahara Avenue, an area that would mark the northern end of the future Las Vegas Strip. The land was just outside of Las Vegas, allowing Hull to avoid the city's taxes, and it was also cheaper than sites located within the city. The property was owned by Jessie Hunt, who had tried for years to sell it, but had no luck because it was viewed as an undesirable location.

=== Design and opening ===
Hull purchased the site and hired architect Wayne McAllister to design the new resort. They had previously worked together on a renovation of the Hollywood Roosevelt Hotel, one of Hull's properties. Hull wanted the Las Vegas project to resemble a scaled-down version of Tijuana's Aqua Caliente resort, which McAllister had also designed. Unable to raise the financing for this project, Hull had McAllister design a smaller resort. Hull was not a gambler, and he initially had no plans to add a casino, until his Las Vegas friends convinced him to do so. The final project was financed mostly by the First National Bank of Las Vegas. Construction was initially set to commence in April 1939, but it had yet to begin as of November 1940; at that time, the start of construction had been delayed because of a lack of lumber during World War II. Construction was underway in February 1941, and work proceeded on a rapid schedule.

After nearly three years of planning, the El Rancho Vegas held a preview opening on April 1, 1941. It was attended by 300 businessmen from out of state. The public opening came on the evening of April 3, 1941. Bankers, businessmen, and other people from California and Nevada attended the grand opening, along with acting couple Rex Bell and Clara Bow. Work on the resort was still ongoing at the time of the opening, with full completion expected in six to eight weeks, in time for the busy tourist season. Landscaping was among the finishing touches, with grass and trees being planted to give the appearance of an oasis in the desert.

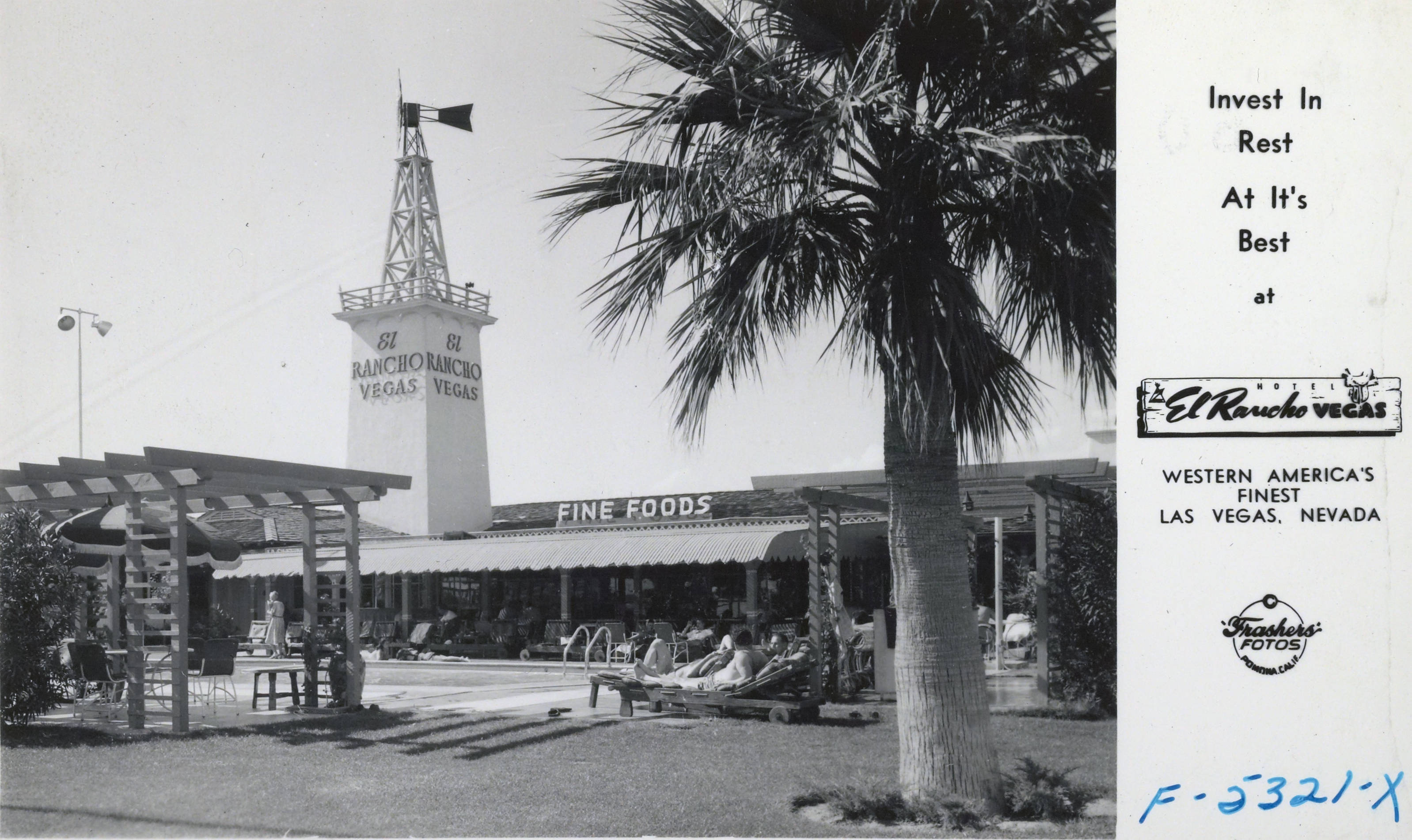
El Rancho Vegas postcard, 1940s

The El Rancho Vegas offered a vacation experience to its guests. Formal clothing was not required at the resort. According to the Los Angeles Times, the El Rancho Vegas "combines the charm and open-handed hospitality of the Old West with the convenience of today". The El Rancho was considered a combination casino/motor court/dude ranch. The Old West theme was prominent throughout the resort, with a Spanish-style exterior and a cowboy/frontier-styled interior. El Rancho Vegas offered horseback riding, the Round-Up Room dinner theater, and a large swimming pool, the latter located along Highway 91 to entice motorists. Hull intended to capitalize on the large number of motorists traveling into Las Vegas from Los Angeles. The resort featured a 50-foot neon windmill, and advertisements encouraged visitors to "stop at the sign of the windmill".

The casino, considered small by later standards, offered four table games: two blackjack tables, one roulette table, and one craps table—and seventy slot machines. The resort had 65 rooms, which included kitchen facilities. The rooms were housed in duplex and fourplex cottages scattered around the property. The one-story cottages were made of wood, and they resembled a residential subdivision, with private lawns and porches, and paved streets. The El Rancho Vegas also offered the Stage Door Steak House, the Nugget Nell lounge, a barbershop, a health club, and retailers such as clothing stores. For its high rollers, the casino offered yacht rides on Lake Mead.

Although the El Rancho was a luxury resort, Hull did not want it to be abundantly fancy, out of fear that this would turn off locals. The resort offered a higher level of luxury compared to its counterparts near Fremont Street, but it was otherwise unremarkable. The gaming area was not particularly large, and western themes were common in Nevada casinos at the time. However, the El Rancho Vegas was notable for its location outside of city limits, and for its concept of a main casino building with restaurants and a theater, surrounded by lodging facilities. Architect Alan Hess later wrote that the El Rancho "set the pattern of the large highway resort hotel. With its opening, the builders of Las Vegas varied the motel archetype a bit: the sign was expanded, the lobby was enlarged to include a casino, and the room wings were surrounded by recreational facilities and lush planting. A bigger budget, a slightly different program but a motel nonetheless."

El Rancho Vegas was the first resort to be built on the Las Vegas Strip, still known then as part of Highway 91. Hull and the El Rancho are credited with the creation of the Strip, as the property's unexpected success prompted other developers to open resorts in the vicinity, eventually transforming Highway 91 into the Strip. Such resorts would re-use the El Rancho's concept of a central casino building. The Strip's second resort, the Hotel Last Frontier, opened in 1942.

=== Early years ===
During World War II, the establishment of the Las Vegas Army Airfield and a nearby magnesium plant helped contribute to the El Rancho's success. Shortly after the opening, Hull announced plans for an adjacent housing community. This consisted of cottage homes, built by the government as recreational space for military personnel returning overseas during World War II. These homes were eventually sold to the El Rancho Vegas after the war ended.

At the end of 1941, Hull had the radio station KENO relocated to the northeastern end of the El Rancho property, where it occupied more than an acre of land. He allowed the station to operate rent-free on the condition that it regularly promote the El Rancho as its broadcasting location. KENO operated on the site for the remainder of the 1940s.

The El Rancho Vegas underwent several ownership changes. In July 1943, Hull sold the resort – along with the housing project located directly north – to Joseph W. Drown. Hull had found it difficult to operate the resort from his hometown of Los Angeles. In June 1944, Drown sold the resort for $1.2 million to Wilbur Clark, a San Diego businessman, and Clayton Smith, a Los Angeles hotel man.

In 1945, Clark partnered with two California businessmen, Joseph and Walter Guzzardi; they would operate the hotel and restaurant portions, while Clark would continue operating the casino. Later that year, Clark accused the Guzzardis of mishandling the resort's finances. As a result, Clark had the El Rancho Vegas placed into receivership, with approval by judge George E. Marshall. In response, the Guzzardis filed a suit against Clark, alleging malicious prosecution with the intent of defrauding them. They alleged that placing the resort into receivership was done in order to make the mortgage payment come due. The Guzzardis ultimately had to sell their shares to Drown at a steep loss. They also alleged that Marshall was a close friend of Clark, and that his gambling debt at the El Rancho Vegas was forgiven in exchange for approving the receivership. Marshall denied the allegations. With the resort still in receivership, Drown agreed to take over ownership again, doing so in February 1946, after the resort exited bankruptcy. It was then briefly leased to several corporations, led by Sanford Adler.

Herb McDonald, the director of entertainment and publicity for the resort, added an all-you-can-eat buffet in 1946. The idea was conceived late one night after he laid out ingredients on a bar to make a sandwich, attracting the attention of hungry gamblers. The buffet was known at various points as the Midnight Chuck Wagon and as the Buckaroo Buffet. It proved to be a success, popularizing the buffet concept in Las Vegas that would become common in other resorts there.

In 1947, American Hotel Association named it as the nation's "ideal western hotel". At the time, the casino floor featured "the only gambling horse in the world." The horse, named Lucky Silver, would nudge chips into place on a roulette table.

=== Katleman family ===
Adler's lease ended in 1948, and Drown leased the El Rancho Vegas to a different group later that year, giving them the ability to purchase the resort at the end of a 10-year lease. Adler threatened legal action, arguing that he should have been first in line for a potential purchase. The new group included Jake Katleman, who served as the casino manager, and was the principal stockholder in the El Rancho Vegas. Katleman was known to be superstitious and would sprinkle salt around gaming tables that lost money. Jake's nephew, Beldon Katleman, booked most of the El Rancho's entertainment.

In June 1950, Jake Katleman died from injuries he sustained in an automobile accident. A month after his death, plans were announced for an expansion and remodeling of the El Rancho. Beldon Katleman took over operations at the end of the year, after buying out the interests of other partners who did not share his vision for resort improvements. In 1951, Katleman began remodeling the El Rancho Vegas and updating its ambiance, with designer Tom Douglas in charge of the renovations.

In 1952, three stockholders in the resort filed a federal suit, alleging that majority holders such as Beldon Katleman did not acknowledge the sale of 495 shares which were purchased by the minority holders. The shares had previously been owned by Jake Katleman until his death. The suit requested that the El Rancho Vegas be placed into receivership, although this effort was unsuccessful. A compromise was eventually reached, in which the three stockholders were reimbursed. The shares were sold to Beldon Katleman, despite objections from Jake Katleman's widow, Liberty, who received monthly payments from her husband's estate. She argued that Beldon Katleman's offer was too low.

In 1953, a customer, John Maher, alleged that he was held under armed guard at the El Rancho Vegas, after writing $400 in bad checks. He filed charges against Katleman and the El Rancho, alleging false imprisonment and seeking damages of $172,000. Maher subsequently withdrew the complaint, although he later filed a $3 million suit, alleging false imprisonment and battery. His wife also filed a suit for $100,000 in damages, saying that she too was detained after arriving at the resort with $400 to have her husband released. A jury eventually ruled in Katleman's favor.

In 1953, Douglas was hired again to enlarge the casino's dinner theater, as part of a $3 million modernization of the resort. Katleman had the western theme replaced with more of a French provincial style. The Round-Up Room was renamed as the Opera House, which also served food. In the late 1950s, the television station KSHO-TV/Channel 13 operated behind the El Rancho, through a lease agreement with Katleman. Western Union also had an office at the resort.

In 1957, Katleman announced plans for an expansion the following year that would include new rooms, a cocktail lounge, and entertainment facilities. Ohio industrialist Ben Aronoff became a 50-percent partner and would invest in the resort and its expansion. Katleman would remain as the El Rancho's manager. At the time, the hotel had 211 rooms. Katleman was optimistic about the resort's future because of the imminent opening of the Las Vegas Convention Center nearby.

The El Rancho's casino was closed on February 16, 1959, for the first time in its history, after Aronoff filed a writ of attachment against the resort, in an attempt to recover nearly $400,000 that he had invested into it. Aronoff said that he wanted to withdraw from the partnership because the resort was losing money, while Katleman said that Aronoff had brought on undesirable partners who would not be satisfactory to the Nevada Gaming Control Board. The case was soon settled, and the casino reopened on February 18, 1959. However, Katleman later sued Aronoff for financial losses caused by the casino closure, and Aronoff threatened to file another writ. A judge eventually ruled in Aronoff's favor on June 15, 1960, saying that Katleman still owed him $240,000.

=== Fire ===
Around 4:30 a.m. on June 17, 1960, a fire broke out in the El Rancho's main building, which contained the casino, offices, buffet, lounge, steakhouse, and the Opera House dining room and showroom. The fire began in a kitchen located next to the Opera House. From there, it spread rapidly and destroyed dressing rooms, a restaurant, and several stores in the pool area. Betty Grable and Harry James were entertaining in the lounge when the fire broke out. Two dozen people fled the fire. Singer Pearl Bailey, along with comedians Phil Ford and Mimi Hines, crashed her vehicle into a tree while they were attempting to escape the fire; Ford then led the women to safety. Within 20 minutes, the fire had engulfed the theater, lounge, and restaurant. Flames reached up to 100 feet in height. Various people showed up to observe the fire, and entertainer Red Skelton took photos of the burning building. The resort's 50-foot neon windmill, a local landmark, toppled over during the fire.

A total of 48 firemen and 20 deputy sheriffs responded to the fire. Four firemen were injured. Approximately 500,000 gallons of water were used, and the fire was under control by 9:15 a.m. There were no guest deaths or injuries, but the main building – made of wood – had been destroyed within an hour, and the resort was closed. The fire caused up to $5 million in damages, leaving the building as a blackened ruin. The fire also destroyed $427,000 in cash. The hotel cottages were undamaged, with the nearest ones being 150 feet away from the main building. The hotel had 222 rooms. Three hours before the fire started, an unidentified man had asked casino executives about another fire that had occurred on the property two years earlier, resulting only in blackened damage to a room. The man was initially considered an arson suspect in the 1960 fire. Ultimately, the cause of the fire is never determined.

The El Rancho Vegas had 400 employees who were put out of work because of the fire and closure. Immediately after the incident, Katleman was considering multiple options for reopening the resort. One possibility was to house the facilities in a giant tent. It was later reported that Katleman wanted to rebuild the El Rancho with a grander style than before. In 1962, Katleman said that he had raised the money necessary to construct a 31-story version of El Rancho Vegas, making it among the tallest hotels in the U.S. News about Katleman's rebuilding was occasionally reported over the years, but such plans never came to fruition.

=== Final years ===
In 1962, Katleman engaged in a failed effort to get the adjacent San Francisco Avenue renamed after the El Rancho; the road was instead renamed Sahara Avenue, after the Sahara resort located across the street.

During 1962, Thunderbird resort, also located across the street, operated 88 of El Rancho Vegas's rooms under the name Thunderbird West, through a lease that extended into 1963. The following year, Alfred Hotels, Inc. announced that it had leased the hotel buildings from Katleman. Alfred Hotels planned to operate them as El Rancho Vegas Motor Inn. Refurbishments were underway at that time, including remodeling of the swimming pool. A wax museum and antique store were opened on the property in 1965, joining the motel.

El Rancho Vegas struggled financially as a non-gaming motel, leading Katleman to put it up for sale in the late 1960s. Businessman Howard Hughes negotiated a $7.5 million deal to buy the property, and Katleman initially agreed before later raising the purchase price. A two-year court battle began in 1968 as Hughes and Katleman fought over the initial purchase agreement. They settled the case in 1970, after Hughes agreed to pay $8.5 million for the property.

The cottages were then used as warehouse storage before being demolished, although some were relocated and preserved. In September 1975, one of the last remaining buildings was removed from the property. In mid-1978, three more buildings were moved to Old Vegas, an Old West amusement park outside of Henderson, Nevada. Another structure is located in Pahrump, Nevada, where it serves as a duplex under the name El Rancho Gardens. This building was added to the Nevada State Register of Historic Places in 1998.

Aside from the cottages, 14 Washingtonia palm trees were also relocated in 1978, to the newly renovated Desert Inn resort nearby.

=== Proposed redevelopment ===
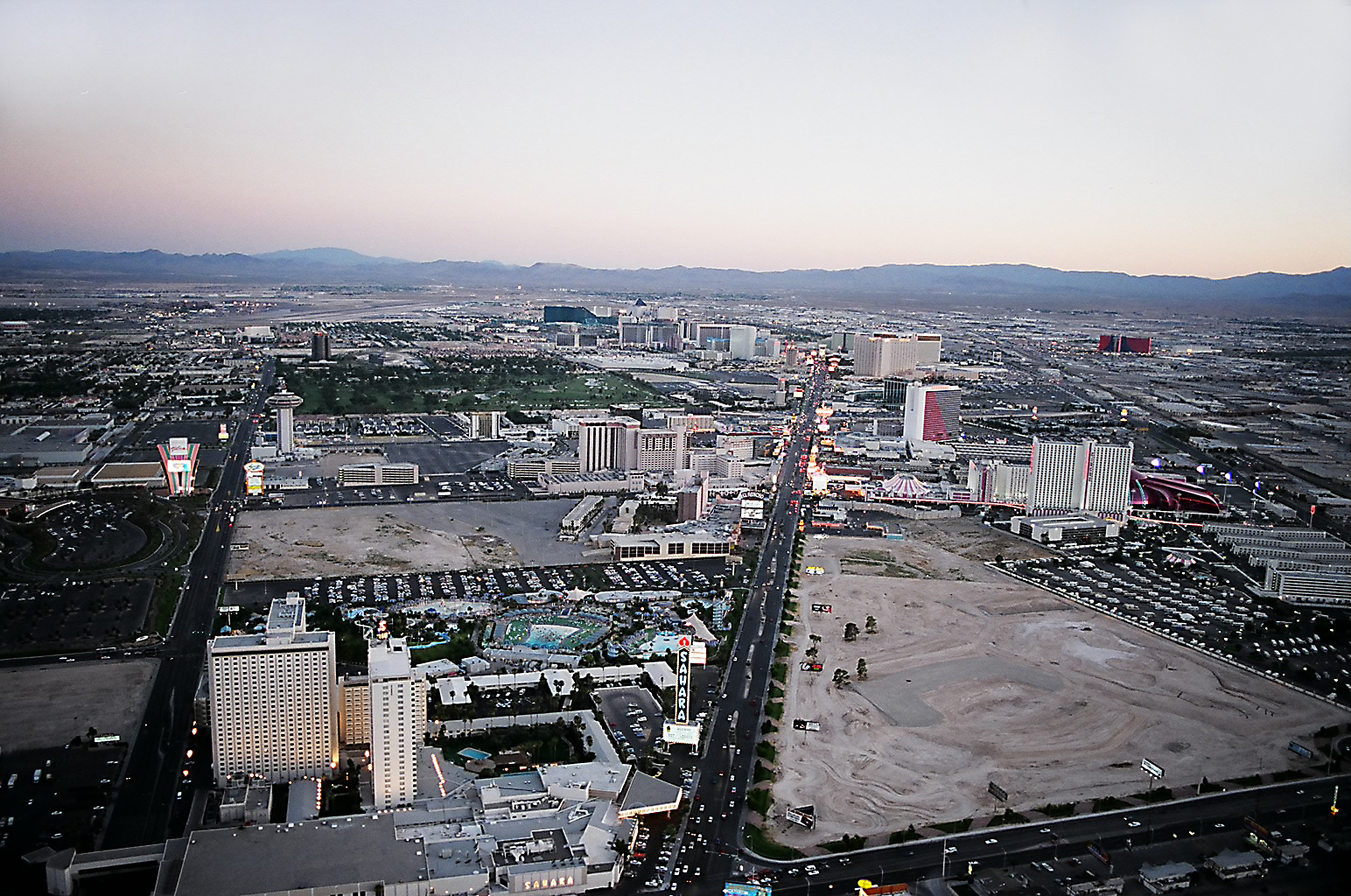
Looking south at the vacant El Rancho property (right) in 1995

The El Rancho Vegas property was vacant as of 1979, and the site remained undeveloped for decades. Several projects were proposed for the site, but were never built. In 1993, there were plans to construct a $5 million entertainment complex that would include a golf driving range, miniature golf courses, batting cages, and a race track. Hughes' Summa Corporation would lease the land to the developer. A baseball stadium was also being planned for the property in 1995, as part of the All-American Family Sports Park. However, William Bennett purchased the property from Summa Corporation later that year, for $40 million. It was one of the last large, undeveloped parcels left on the Las Vegas Strip. Bennett planned to eventually develop the site, but was occupied in the meantime with renovations at his newly acquired Sahara resort. Some preliminary foundation work had already begun for the sports park when Bennett canceled the company's lease.

Representatives for Hassanal Bolkiah, the sultan of Brunei, made a $55 million offer for the land in 1996. However, the sultan vetoed the offer, which was apparently made without his knowledge. Real estate developer Donald Trump also discussed a possible purchase of the land, but passed. In the late 1990s, a group planned to build a western-themed resort on the site. It would include a Billy Bob's nightclub and a 5,000-seat arena with daily rodeo events. However, the group had difficulty raising money to build the project, and it never materialized. In 2000, Hilton Grand Vacations announced plans to build a timeshare building on part of the property. The Hilton Grand Vacations Club would eventually open in 2004, on 10 acres located at the southern edge of the El Rancho property.

Meanwhile, Bennett started marketing the remaining 26 acres again in 2000, with an asking price of $65 million. He pulled the property off the market in 2002, believing that its value would increase further in the years to come, as the north Las Vegas Strip was expected to see new development. Bennett died later in 2002, and the property was sold to MGM Mirage in 2007. The company, partnered with Kerzner International Resorts and Dubai World, planned to build a mixed-use development project with hotels and a casino, similar to MGM's CityCenter. Construction was to begin in 2009, with the opening expected three years later. The project, sometimes referred to as CityCenter North, was canceled because of the Great Recession. Ultimately, MGM opened its Festival Grounds on the property in 2015. This development saw minimal success, and the property was sold to Phil Ruffin in 2019.

== Entertainers and shows ==
Big entertainers who performed regularly at the El Rancho included Dean Martin, Sophie Tucker, Eartha Kitt, and Joe E. Lewis. Other performers included Tony Bennett, Milton Berle, Joey Bishop, Jack Carter, Billy Daniels, Zsa Zsa Gabor, Betty Grable and Harry James, Betty Garrett, Larry Parks, Lili St. Cyr, Sammy Davis Jr. and the Will Mastin Trio, Sunny Skylar, and The Williams Brothers.

Gloria Dea entertained at the El Rancho in May 1941, becoming the first magician to perform on the Strip. During the 1940s, the resort also featured a female group known as the El Rancho Starlets, which gave nightly performances. In 1949, the casino featured the George Moro Dancers, which consisted of female dancers dressed as dice. Shirley Bassey made her American stage debut at the El Rancho Vegas in 1957.

Following a new Las Vegas trend, the El Rancho added nude showgirls in 1958, but soon removed them after criticism from religious leaders. Katleman said that showgirls would be covered from that point forward. He revived the nude concept in 1959, when he added a Parisian show called La Nouvelle Eve. Shortly thereafter, Katleman ended the show and added a similar replacement called La Nou Eve. Rene Bardy, the creator of La Nouvelle Eve, later sued Katleman. The suit alleged that Katleman conspired to get Bardy terminated, and that Katleman then added the cheaper replacement show to profit off of Bardy's reputation while saving money. Bardy eventually won his case against Katleman.

Stripper Candy Barr was headlining at El Rancho Vegas in 1959 when she was arrested by the FBI after her appeal on a marijuana conviction originating in Texas was rejected by the US Supreme Court.

The El Rancho Vegas was a popular hangout for celebrities, and several notable individuals were married at the resort, including Joan Blondell and Mike Todd (1947), Marion Davies and Horace Brown (1951), Hal March and Candy Toxton (1956), Steve Lawrence and Eydie Gormé (1957), and Paul Newman and Joanne Woodward (1958). Some performers also lived on the property, including Lewis and numerous showgirls.

== In popular culture ==
The El Rancho Vegas is featured in the 1955 film Las Vegas Shakedown. A replica of the resort was built in Lancaster, California, as a filming location for the 1991 film The Marrying Man. An NBC Television Special from 1959 titled The Lucy-Desi Milton Berle Special also featured the hotel.
