= Morgan Mason =

American movie producer, actor and politician

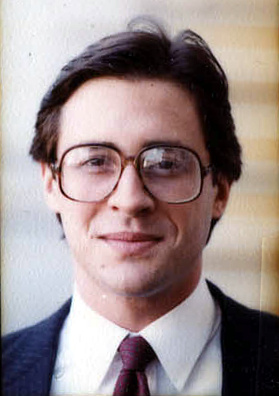
- Mason in 1981

Acting Chief of Protocol of the United States
- In office January 21, 1981 – March 20, 1981
- President: Ronald Reagan
- Preceded by: Abelardo L. Valdez
- Succeeded by: Leonore Annenberg

Deputy Chief of Protocol of the United States
- President: Ronald Reagan

Special Assistant to the President of the United States
- President: Ronald Reagan

Personal details
- Born: Alexander Morgan Mason; June 26, 1955 (age 71) Los Angeles, California, U.S.
- Spouse: Belinda Carlisle (m. 1986)
- Children: 1
- Parents: James Mason (father); Pamela Mason (mother)
- Relatives: Portland Mason (sister); Isidore Ostrer (grandfather)
- Occupation: Political operative; film producer; actor

Alexander Morgan Mason (born June 26, 1955) is an American film producer, actor, and political operative. He was born to actors Pamela Mason and James Mason, and he is married to singer Belinda Carlisle.

== Early life ==
Mason was born June 26, 1955, in Los Angeles, California, the son of English parents, actor James Mason and actress and commentator Pamela Mason. His maternal grandfather, the financier and film producer Isidore Ostrer, was head of the Gaumont-British Picture Corporation.

As a child, Mason appeared in the films Hero's Island (1962), along with his father, and The Sandpiper (1965), with Elizabeth Taylor and Richard Burton.

== Business career ==
When his grandfather Isidore Ostrer died, Mason inherited his seat on the board of Illingworth, Morris, Ltd., then the world's largest woolen textile company. Mason served as executive director and three years later sold the firm.

== Political career ==
After moving to the U.S., Mason worked for Ronald Reagan's 1980 presidential campaign. He served as assistant finance director, then as major events director, and served as a member of the campaign's executive advisory committee. Reagan selected him as a delegate-at-large from California to the 1980 Republican national convention. After the election, Mason was named special assistant to the co-chairmen of the presidential inaugural committee.

After the inauguration, Mason was appointed deputy chief of protocol at the State Department. He was then named special assistant to the president for political affairs. During his tenure he was chosen to attend the funeral services of Egyptian president Anwar Sadat as a member of the official United States delegation, along with former U.S. presidents Richard Nixon, Gerald Ford and Jimmy Carter.

From 1981 to 1982, at age 25, Mason served as Special Assistant to the President for Political Affairs in the White House Office of Political Affairs under President Reagan, one of the youngest full-time West Wing staffers in the modern era. Holding a West Wing badge and Top Secret/SCI clearance, he worked in the Eisenhower Executive Office Building, reported through Lyn Nofziger and later Ed Rollins, and had regular access to President Reagan while coordinating political strategy and GOP outreach.

== PR, film and television ==
After Mason left the White House in 1982, he became the vice president of Rogers and Cowan Public Relations. In 1984, he joined promoter Don King to promote the Jacksons' Victory Tour. Mason was an executive producer of Sex, Lies, and Videotape (1989), which won the Palme d'Or at the Cannes Film Festival and the Audience Award at the Sundance Film Festival. In 1986, Reagan appointed him to The Commission for the Preservation of America's Heritage Abroad and made him a special advisor to the President's Council on Physical Fitness and Sports.

In 1990, Mason became vice president and head of the independent film division of the William Morris Agency in Beverly Hills. He left to become chief executive of London Films in 1996. In 1999 Mason founded the European television channel Innergy in partnership with musician Dave Stewart of Eurythmics, who was introduced to Mason by Deepak Chopra. It was "the first channel of its kind in the world with programmes offering viewers help and guidance for self-empowerment."

== Personal life ==
Mason married singer Belinda Carlisle in 1986, eloping to Lake Tahoe. They have a son, James Duke Mason. In 2017, he and Carlisle moved to Bangkok, Thailand, and by 2023 they were living in Mexico City.

Political offices
Preceded by Abelardo L. Valdez	Chief of Protocol of the United States; Acting; January 21, 1981 – March 20, 1981	Succeeded by Leonore Annenberg
