= Herbert MacDonald =

Herbert MacDonald or McDonald may refer to:

- Herbert Stone MacDonald (1842–1921), Ontario lawyer, judge and political figure
- Herbert S. MacDonald (1907–1998), justice of the Connecticut Supreme Court
- Herbert Macdonald (sportsman) (1902–1991), Jamaican footballer, tennis player, writer, sports administrator and promoter
- Herbert McDonald (cyclist) (1885–1962), Canadian cyclist
- Herb McDonald (1919–2002), Las Vegas promoter and publicist
