= Panic! (TV series) =

American television anthology series

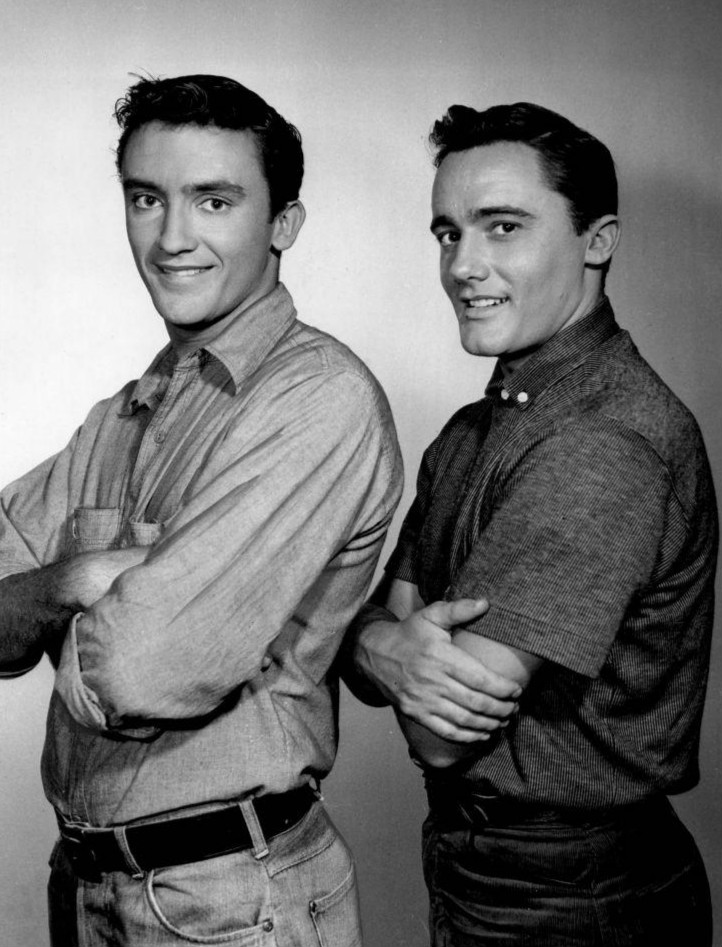
Ronnie Burns and Robert Vaughn in episode "Double Identity" (1958)

Panic!, broadcast as No Warning! during its second season, is a half-hour American television anthology series. Its 31 episodes aired on NBC from 1957 to 1958. The series host was Westbrook Van Voorhis.

== Premise and production ==
Each episode began with a person facing a sudden physical or emotional crisis.

Panic! was produced by McCadden Productions. Al Simon was the producer. Rod Amateau was the director, and David Dotort was the writer.

== Schedule ==
The 30-minute Panic! was broadcast at 8:30 p.m. Eastern Time on Tuesdays on NBC from March 5, 1957, through September 17, 1957. It replaced Noah's Ark and was sponsored by Chesterfield cigarettes and Max Factor cosmetics.

In June 1957 network executives commissioned 21 additional episodes. Repeats of previous episodes were shown until September 17, 1957, leaving the new episodes to be broadcast later.

The first episode of No Warning! was broadcast on NBC on April 6, 1958, and the last episode was on September 7, 1958. Fourteen episodes were original, and nine were repeats of episodes of Panic!.

== Guest stars ==
Among notable guest stars were June Havoc, Darryl Hickman, Pamela Mason, James Mason, James Whitmore, Norman Leavitt, Robert Anderson, Trevor Bardette, William Kendis, Robert Vaughn, James Parnell, Barbara Billingsley, Paul Burke, William Fawcett, Clark Howat, Gary Hunley, Vivi Janiss, Ken Mayer, Chris Alcaide, Mercedes McCambridge, Ray Kellogg, Ann Rutherford, Dale Ishimoto, Robert Burton, Wilson Wood, Jess Kirkpatrick, Ray Teal, Paul Stader, John Goddard, Peggy Knudsen, Alan Dexter, Frank J. Scannell and Carolyn Jones.

== Episodes ==
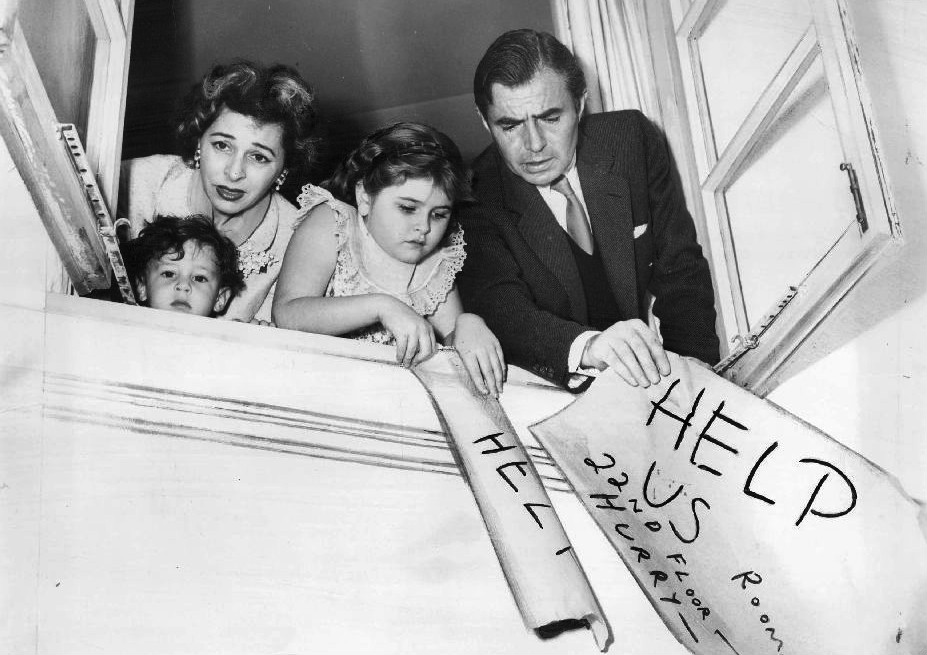
James Mason and family in episode "Marooned" (1957)

In the 1957 episode "Marooned," James Mason, his wife Pamela and children Portland and Morgan portrayed a family trapped in a high rise building.

"The Priest" (1957) dealt with a priest who heard a man's confession about planning a murder. When the man died before giving details, the priest (played by Whitmore) turned detective to try to prevent the murder.

== Critical response ==
A review in the trade publication Variety described Panic! as "a routine dramatic series." It said, "Off-camera narration by Westbrook Van Voorhis provided a strong dramatic boost, while the dramatic performances were okay."
