= Portland Mason =

British-American actress (1948–2004)

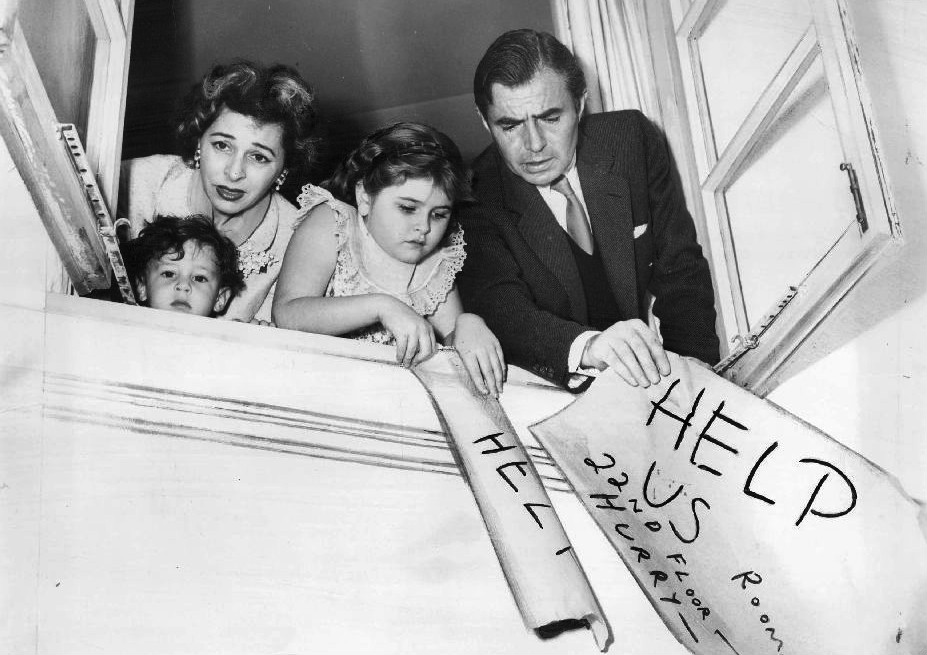
- Mason (3rd from left) with her brother Morgan, mother Pamela and father James, depicted in a scene from 1957's Panic!
- Born: 26 November 1948; Los Angeles, California
- Died: 10 May 2004 (aged 55); Santa Monica, California, U.S.
- Other name: Portland Schuyler
- Occupations: Actress and writer
- Years active: 1954–1968
- Spouse(s): Rob Schuyler (m. 19??)
- Parents: James Mason (father); Pamela Mason (mother)
- Relatives: Morgan Mason (brother); Isidore Ostrer (grandfather); Belinda Carlisle (sister-in-law)

Portland Mason (/meɪsən/; 26 November 1948 – 10 May 2004) was a British-American child actress and writer.

== Early life ==
Mason was born on 26 November 1948 and was the elder child of English actors James Mason and Pamela Mason. She was named after Portland Hoffa, the wife of James Mason's friend Fred Allen.

She enjoyed a luxurious upbringing in her parents' Hollywood mansion, allowed to wear makeup and stiletto heels, and owning her own mink coat and diamonds by the age of nine. Her highly publicized life began with her father becoming violent towards a photographer at the little girl's christening. When she attended high school, Mason was dropped off every morning by a Rolls-Royce and picked up every evening by a white Cadillac. Her father introduced her to smoking at the age of three in hope it would put her off it in later life. The family sometimes claimed reports of her extravagant childhood were exaggerated, and a London reporter who interviewed her in 1966 found her "surprisingly unspoilt, somewhat shy and unassuming". In 1963 her father moved the family to Switzerland.

== Career ==
Mason began her acting career young, appearing on many television shows and by the age of four had starred in her own short entitled The Child. Mason then went on to play the daughter of Gregory Peck's character in the 1956 film The Man in the Gray Flannel Suit. After that, she appeared in many films, shows and television series. As a 13-year-old in 1962, she had a contract dispute with Lyl Productions. She had been cast in the role of "Marnie" for The New Loretta Young Show but was dismissed over leaving the studio lot for lunch and missing the start of rehearsals. The Mason family and Lyl Productions sued each other for breach of contract, with both the trial and subsequent appeal finding in favour of the Mason family.

Her most notable role was Georgina in The Great St Trinian's Train Robbery in 1966. Following her final film role in 1968's Sebastian, she took up her mother's profession as a writer. According to her husband, she had been writing a book about her father before her death.

== Personal life ==
In 1971, James Mason married his second wife, Clarissa Kaye. After he died in 1984, Mason and her brother were involved in a protracted legal battle with their stepmother over their father's will and his cremated remains. In 1999, they obtained their father's ashes. Portland Mason had a debilitating stroke shortly after her father's ashes were spread in Vevey, Switzerland in November 2000.

== Death ==
After a long illness, Mason died on 10 May 2004, survived by her husband Rob Schuyler.

== Filmography ==
Film
Year	Title	Role	Notes
1954	The Child	Sally	short
1956	The Man in the Gray Flannel Suit	Janey Rath	
1956	Bigger Than Life	Nancy	uncredited
1958	Cry Terror!	Patty's Friend on Schoolbus	
1966	The Great St. Trinian's Train Robbery	Georgina	
1968	Sebastian	'UG' Girl	
Television
Year	Title	Role	Notes
1954	The George Burns and Gracie Allen Show	Porty	1 episode
1955	The Ed Sullivan Show	Herself	1 episode
1956	The Steve Allen Show	Herself	1 episode
1957	Panic!	–	1 episode
1957	Playhouse 90	Jane Millet	1 episode
1958	Tonight Starring Jack Paar	Herself	2 episodes
1959	December Bride	Niece	1 episode
1960	Shirley Temple's Storybook	Princess Elizabeth	1 episode
1961	Bringing Up Buddy	Norma Nicky Marlo	1 episode
1962	Here's Hollywood	Herself	2 episodes
1962	Hennesey	Yvette Fandlebusch	1 episode
1966	Bob Hope Comedy Special	Herself	1 episode
