= Sebastian (1968 film) =

British spy film by David Greene

- Directed by: David Greene
- Written by: Gerald Vaughan-Hughes (screenplay); Leo Marks (story)
- Produced by: Michael Powell; Herbert Brodkin; Gerry Fisher
- Starring: Dirk Bogarde; Susannah York; Lilli Palmer; John Gielgud
- Cinematography: Gerald Fisher
- Music by: Jerry Goldsmith
- Production company: Maccius Films
- Distributed by: Paramount British Pictures
- Release date: 24 January 1968
- Running time: 100 minutes
- Country: United Kingdom
- Language: English

Sebastian (also known as Mister Sebastian) is a 1968 British spy film directed by David Greene, produced by Michael Powell, Herbert Brodkin and Gerry Fisher, and distributed by Paramount Pictures. The film is based on a story by Leo Marks, and Gerald Vaughan-Hughes wrote the screenplay.

== Plot ==
While running through the streets of Oxford to attend the bestowing of an honorary degree on the Prime Minister, Mr. Sebastian runs into model and former Oxford mathematics student Rebecca (Becky) Howard. After insulting Sebastian on the spot, Becky is intrigued by him and follows him to the ceremony. After Becky is able to spell her own name backwards, he gives her a phone number to call if she wants an unspecified job with the British civil service.

After doing well in the difficult interview, Becky learns that the job is with the all-female decoding office of British Intelligence that Sebastian directs, deciphering codes used by secret agents and foreign spies. Once settled in her new job, like the other women Becky becomes infatuated with the aloof director, whose personal life they know nothing of.

Besides the constant stress from the difficult work, Gen. John Phillips, head of security, accuses Sebastian's longtime senior decoder Elsa Shahn of being a security risk because of her left-wing Communist leanings. Sebastian convinces the Head of Intelligence to retain Shahn because of her value to him. Becky pursues and seduces Sebastian, who leaves his girlfriend, washed-up pop singer Carol Fancy.

The Swinging Sixties Becky dislikes the aloof Sebastian's obsession with work to the detriment of the rest of his life, including his shambling bachelor's apartment and her. Shahn provides secret information to a left-wing political organisation. When confronted with the security breach by Phillips—and Becky embarrassing him by accidentally revealing their relationship to the office—Sebastian resigns, breaks up with Becky, and returns to Oxford. Months later, the Head of Intelligence asks Sebastian to return temporarily, as the Americans have asked for his help to decipher signals from a Russian spy satellite. He agrees, if Shahn receives a full pension.

While looking for Becky, who also left the decoding department after Sebastian's resignation, Sebastian runs into Carol, who invites him to her apartment. Sebastian is drugged with LSD and lured to the top of the building by Toby, who unknown to Sebastian, is both Carol's lover and a foreign agent. Just as Toby is about to persuade the hallucinating Sebastian to jump off the building ledge to his death, Phillips saves him and arrests Toby.

Sebastian finds Becky, learns that he is the father of her newborn baby, and admits his love for her. A noise from the baby's rattle provides Sebastian with a clue to the Soviet signal. While again exasperated by Sebastian's obsession with his work, Becky assists as he immediately begins decoding the signal in her living room.

== Cast ==
- Dirk Bogarde as Sebastian
- Susannah York as Rebecca "Becky" Howard
- Lilli Palmer as Elsa Shahn
- John Gielgud as Head of Intelligence
- Nigel Davenport as General John Phillips
- Janet Munro as Carol Fancy
- Ronald Fraser as Toby
- John Ronane as Jameson
- Donald Sutherland as Ackerman
- Margaret Johnston as Miss Elliott
- Ann Beach as Pamela
- Ann Sidney as Naomi
- Veronica Clifford as Ginny
- Alan Freeman as TV Chairman
- Hayward Morse as Gavin
- Portland Mason as "UG" Girl
- James Belchamber as Man With Dog

== Production ==
It was filmed on location in Oxford, London, Jodrell Bank and at Twickenham Film Studios, St Margarets, Twickenham, Middlesex, England. It was Janet Munro's first film after a number of years dedicated to raising her family.

== Release ==
The film debuted in New York City, New York on 24 January 1968.

== Reception ==
The Monthly Film Bulletin wrote: "In The Shuttered Room David Greene revealed both a strong visual imagination and a talent for atmospheric scene-setting. Sebastian confirms that promise, but here again Greene's direction is undercut by a script which toys with an interesting idea and then abandons it for a string of anti-heroic platitudes and a scrappily engineered conclusion. ... Disappointingly, the clichés soon begin to crowd in, and even Bogarde looks unhappy with lines like "I'm a kind of septic tank for all the world's ugly secrets". Characters are introduced and then abruptly abandoned before they have had a chance to establish themselves ... ideas which begin to look interestingly enigmatic soon resolve themselves into spy thriller conventions ... Nevertheless, David Greene has an eye for detail which makes the film always attractive to look at ... and he gets a solidly intelligent performance from Bogarde and spirited support from Susannah York."

In his 12 March 1968 review, Chicago Sun Times critic Roger Ebert said [Sebastian] "is a movie that moves confidently in three directions, arriving nowhere with a splendid show of style." Ebert feels the film starts as a thriller about code-cracking operations, then it becomes a love affair between Bogarde and York, then there is the leak to the left-wing activist group by Palmer, and "in spectacular and tender denouement," Bogarde saves the free world by cracking the Soviet satellite code that resembles his baby's rattle noise.

Renata Adler of the New York Times was similarly lukewarm, calling Sebastian "a medium saturation put-on ... one of the problems with this sort of movie is the enormous pressure that it puts on the audience to have a good time over almost nothing." She concludes her review by writing, "If only people wouldn't try to spoof everything at once, but concentrate on doing a thought-out funny thing or two."

Variety identified essentially the same problem, complaining that even though the central code-breaking material had "potent angles for a strong film, but, herein, story touches so many bases that it never really finds a definite concept." Even its star Dirk Bogarde called the film a "non-event" at the time of its release.
