= Thomas E. Hull =

American hotelier (1893–1964)

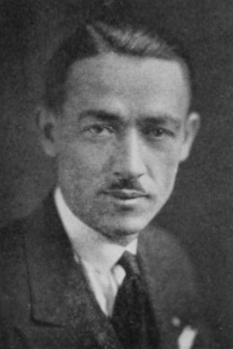
- Born: Thomas Everett Hull; October 4, 1893; Colorado Springs, Colorado, US
- Died: July 17, 1964 (aged 70); Beverly Hills, California, US
- Education: Colorado Agricultural and Mechanical College
- Occupation: Hotel operator
- Spouse: Gertrude Mary Keegan (m. 1927)

Thomas Everett Hull (1893–1964) was an American hotel operator, the creator of the El Rancho Vegas Hotel in Las Vegas, Nevada.

== Career ==
Thomas E. Hull was born in Colorado Springs on October 4, 1893. He graduated from the Colorado Agricultural and Mechanical College in 1913. Prior to World War I, he owned and operated 22 theaters in Texas and New Mexico. Following his service as a captain in the aviation section of the Army Signal Corps during the war, Hull entered the hotel business.

Hull's significant contributions to the hotel industry included the construction of the El Rancho Vegas Hotel in Las Vegas, Nevada. He played a pivotal role in establishing the shows on the Las Vegas Strip.

Over the years, Hull operated a total of 22 hotels on the West Coast. In one transaction, he sold the Hollywood Roosevelt Hotel and the El Rancho Hotel in Sacramento to Illinois Wesleyan University for $10 million, subsequently taking both hotels back for operation on a 20-year lease.

Later in his career, Hull led a syndicate of businessmen and hotel operators in the acquisition of the Flamingo Hotel and casino in Las Vegas for $9 million.

== Personal life ==
Hull married Gertrude Mary Keegan on April 12, 1927.

He died at his home in Beverly Hills, California on July 17, 1964.
