= Refil =

Refil may refer to:

- Refil Björnsson, a son of the Swedish king Björn Ironside and brother of king Erik Björnsson in Hervarar saga and in Nafnaþulur
- Refil (sword), the sword of Regin in Skáldskaparmál, see Riðill

== See also ==
- Refill (disambiguation)
