= Old Vegas =

1970s-1980s theme park in Henderson, Nevada

- Previously known as Westworld (1979)
- 1982 logo
- Interactive map of Old Vegas
- Location: 2440 South Boulder Highway, Henderson, Nevada
- Coordinates: 35.995423°N 114.928359°W
- Status: Defunct
- Opened: November 1978
- Closed: July 1, 1986
- Theme: 1850s Las Vegas / American Old West
- Slogan: A Passport to the Past

Old Vegas was an amusement park at 2440 South Boulder Highway in Henderson, Nevada, located in the Las Vegas Valley. The park's theme was American Old Western, modeled after 1850s Las Vegas. The site included various amusement rides and a replica of Las Vegas' Old Mormon Fort, which contained the Hondo Casino. As of 1979, the casino accounted for half of Old Vegas. The park also featured several relocated buildings from the former El Rancho Vegas hotel on the Las Vegas Strip. The Eureka Locomotive was also on display at the park during the 1980s. Old Vegas was developed as a sister property to Old Tucson, a similar theme park in Arizona.

Old Vegas was approved by the Henderson City Council in January 1975, and construction was underway in 1977. Old Vegas opened the first of two phases in November 1978, with more than 100 employees. The park briefly closed for alterations during 1979, following its sale to television producer Burt Sugarman and Mexican industrialist Gabriel Alarcon Jr. Sugarman and Alarcon reopened the park under the name Westworld, although the park reverted to its original name later that year. Sugarman and Alarcon applied for a gaming license to continue operating Old Vegas' casino, although Alarcon was denied a license because of state investigators' inability to adequately trace the source of his money.

Construction of a second phase began in July 1980, and was completed later that year. The park closed in 1986 for remodeling, but was never reopened. During the 1990s, there were plans to add three hotel-casinos on the site, but none materialized. Old Vegas was demolished in 1997, and a 631-unit housing subdivision, also named Old Vegas, was approved for the land in 2001.

== History ==
In January 1975, the Henderson City Council unanimously approved plans for Old Vegas, a 124-acre (50 ha) American Old West project that would be built along Boulder Highway. The project would include a western village, apartments, a dude ranch, and stables. The project was also intended to be used as a filming location for television series and western films. The project would be developed by a group that also owned Arizona's Old Tucson theme park and was led by Robert Shelton. The project was expected to begin construction within six months, with an opening expected in late 1976. The park's target audience was tourists and families. The $8.1 million project was proposed by Old Vegas Corporation (later Old West Corporation), and would feature the history of southern Nevada, with a recreation of 1850s Las Vegas as its theme.

Cecil Simmons was the primary organizer of Old Vegas and would later become one of the main financiers for the project. The western theme park and film studio was designed by Shelton with architecture firm Wells, Tate and Kennedy. The project was master planned by Dallas-based LARC (Leisure and Recreation Concepts) with Robert L. Smith Construction as the general contractor. Old Vegas was to be constructed in two phases, with the second phase initially planned to be completed by the end of October 1978. The first phase was under construction in 1977, and was expected to cost $2.5 million, with completion expected in spring 1978. The project would be built on 55 of the 124 acres. Future plans for the remaining 69 acres included a resort ranch, a motel, a camp site, and an apartment complex, all of which would be built after Old Vegas generated the necessary funds. The project's 12,800 sq ft (1,190 m^{2}) sound stage would be similar to Old Tucson and would include wardrobe and production facilities. The layout of the project's western streets was done by Hollywood art directors to be accommodating to film production companies.

The opening of the park's first phase was later scheduled for mid-June 1978, with the entire park expected to be complete by summer 1979. Old Vegas' first phase was later scheduled to open in September 1978, with a cost of $3.5 million. The final cost of the project was expected to be between $7 million and $10 million. During mid-1978, three buildings from the former El Rancho Vegas hotel on the Las Vegas Strip were relocated to become part of Old Vegas, to be restored for future television and film appearances. In August 1978, Old Tucson Corporation reached an agreement to merge with Old West Corporation, the park's developer. Old Vegas was developed as a sister property to Old Tucson, and was built at the southeastern edge of Henderson.

=== Opening and sale ===
Old Vegas opened its first phase in November 1978, with over 100 employees. Phase two would include western buildings and amusement rides, including a stage coach and a steam train. A third phase was also being planned at the time of opening. Located along Boulder Highway was an 11-foot-high bronze statue of Raphael Rivera, advertising the theme park. Also located along Boulder Highway was a replica of Las Vegas' Old Mormon Fort. The $3.5 million fort housed several attractions, including a sutler store and a blacksmith area. The fort also included the Hondo Cantina, featuring a first-floor saloon and steakhouse, and a 225-seat banquet room on the second floor. Also within the fort was the Hondo Casino, and a historical museum. Additionally, the fort included the 300-seat Commandant's Theatre, which showed visitors a film presentation narrated by Dale Robertson, depicting the history of the local area. The theme park advertised with the slogan "A Passport to the Past".

In November 1978, the city council approved plans for 140 townhouses to be built at Old Vegas. Later that month, Old West Corporation received unanimous approval from the Nevada Gaming Commission to operate 87 slot machines at Old Vegas' casino, which began operations in December 1978, with 70 machines. In February 1979, a fire began in the attic of an employee locker room, but was quickly extinguished. A former employee was found to have set the fire and was arrested for arson. That month, the directors of Old Tucson Corporation agreed to sell a majority of the company's shares to Burt Sugarman, a Los Angeles television producer; and Gabriel Alarcon Jr., a Mexico City industrialist.

=== Westworld ===
Old Vegas was temporarily closed on March 13, 1979, to undergo alterations for a planned reopening the following month under the name Westworld. Mary Kempner, the park's marketing manager, stated that while Shelton had wanted Old Vegas "along the lines of Knott's Berry Farm, Sugarman has more of a Disneyland type of park in mind so it is planned to be a blend of the two with the authenticity of the old." Among the alterations was the remodeling of the park's kitchen facilities to ensure faster service. Other planned upgrades would include more youth attractions, including a video game arcade and a train exhibit, as well as eight major amusement rides and four children's rides, all of which was to be opened by June 30, 1979. Also considered was the showing of approximately nine hours of Priscilla Presley's home movies of her husband Elvis that had never been shown to the public. Other future plans included a covered rodeo ground. The new board of directors applied for a gaming license to continue operating 92 slot machines in the casino.

Westworld's opening became uncertain when the Nevada Gaming Commission denied a request by Sugarman and Alarcon to operate the casino while they underwent a state-mandated gaming license investigation. The casino accounted for half of the park at that time. In May 1979, the city council approved Sugarman to operate three blackjack tables at Westworld, and the gaming commission gave him unanimous approval for gambling operations. That month, Old Tucson Corporation announced that it had acquired many items and memorabilia from Paramount Pictures' western street that would be incorporated into Westworld's western street. Old Tucson Corporation also announced that it had purchased the rights to showcase the Elvis Presley home movies at Westworld and Old Tucson. Old Tucson Corporation was renamed Westworld Inc. during May 1979.

Westworld opened in early June 1979. Priscilla Presley visited the park shortly before its opening to film an introduction to the home movies that the park planned to show in its theater. Later in June 1979, the city council approved plans for amusement rides to be built on land that was previously planned for Old Vegas buildings. At the end of the month, Alarcon was denied a gaming license as state investigators could not satisfactorily trace the source of his money, due to Mexico's different accounting procedures. In August 1979, LARC reached an agreement to assist in the management and operations of Westworld and Old Tucson.

=== Expansions and fire ===
In September 1979, Sugarman sold his interest in Westworld Inc. and the park reverted to its original Old Vegas name. By that point, Simmons was the overseer of gambling operations at the park. By 1980, Old Vegas included two restaurants and a casino, and there were plans to rebuild the Paramount Pictures western street adjacent to the park's Old Mormon Fort. Westworld Inc. began construction of the second phase in July 1980. The second phase would include a railroad museum and other historic exhibits, as well as the Wagon Camp picnic and barbecue areas. Part of the second phase was the Eureka Locomotive, which went on permanent display at Old Vegas, along with Virginia and Truckee Railroad equipment. Other additions would include a merry-go-round, go-karts, and an antique steam locomotive.

The second phase cost $1.5 million, and was opened in October 1980. More than 10,000 people attended Old Vegas during the opening weekend of the second phase. The third phase, consisting of a western street and additional rides, was scheduled to begin construction in December or January. Nearby residents subsequently complained about noise coming from the park, including music, simulated gun fights, and late-night fireworks. Westworld Inc. suffered financial losses in 1982, mostly resulting because of poor customer attendance at Old Vegas. Plans to renovate the park were indefinitely shelved. Old Vegas ultimately consisted of several small streets, but not a full western town. The park had little use as a filming location. To raise revenue, Westworld Inc. attempted to sell land surrounding Old Vegas, but had ruled out a sale of the park for the time being. During 1984 and 1985, Westworld planned to sell Old West Corporation. A Tony Roma's restaurant operated at the park during the mid-1980s.

A fire occurred at the park on the night of May 8, 1985, burning down the park's rock shop, which collapsed onto the Eureka locomotive. After less than an hour, the fire was put out by the local fire department. A police detective stated that the fire was not started naturally and likely was not due to an electrical issue; arson was considered a possibility. Westworld subsequently was given three extended deadlines to install a retrofit fire sprinkler system, with the final deadline being July 1, 1986.

=== Closure and redevelopment plans ===
Westworld Inc. chose to close the park on July 1, 1986, to install the fire sprinkler system and conduct other remodeling. Old Vegas was expected to reopen in approximately 60 days. However, later in July, Westworld Inc. instead put the closed theme park and the entire 125-acre property up for sale at a price of $5.6 million. For the previous two years, Westworld Inc. had made private attempts to sell the park. At the time of the closure, the Henderson Home News stated, "Park managers have kept Old Vegas' local profile very low and seem to only actively recruit bus tour and other visitor-related customers." In late December 1986, Las Vegas resident Steve Allen and local developer Maurice Threinen agreed to purchase 43.5 acres that included the Old Vegas facilities, with plans to reopen the park in March 1987. In February 1987, Westworld Inc. put Old Vegas into Chapter 11 bankruptcy during the impending sale. By the following month, Allen and Threinen had experienced undisclosed problems and had yet to complete their purchase of the park. They had also not yet applied for various city and state licenses needed to operate the property, including gambling licenses.

By April 1987, Threinen's purchase contract with Westworld Inc. had defaulted and the company then began negotiations with MarCor Development, a development firm based in Las Vegas that agreed to purchase the entire 125-acre property. MarCor had unfinalized plans to develop the 125 acres into a multi-use tourist and residential project. MarCor's purchase of the property was complete in September 1987; the debt issue had been resolved by Westworld Inc. MarCor and Boyd Group, among other entities, then formed Sunset Partners to develop a hotel-casino project on the 125-acre property. The partnership hoped to begin construction in early 1988, with an opening by the end of the year. Tentative plans would include a 200-room hotel, a 200-space RV park, and a small theme park. The overall project would cost $20 million to $30 million, and would include the removal of the fort. The rides would also be removed, and other family attractions such as a bowling alley and a picnic area would be added. MarCor remained undecided on whether to keep the Old Vegas name. Groundbreaking for the new resort was delayed for various reasons, including the opening of several new resorts in the Las Vegas Valley.

Focus 2000, formerly MarCor Development, announced plans in July 1992 to refurbish and reopen Old Vegas, including the fort and its restaurant and casino. Focus 2000 was a spinoff of MarCor Resorts, which owned the Rio hotel-casino in the Las Vegas Valley. Following the planned reopening, Focus 2000 intended to build up to three hotel-casino projects afterward to accompany Old Vegas. Also planned were three truck and RV centers and a possible factory outlet mall. Over the next year, Focus 2000 worked on the project plan with nearby residents who were concerned about its impact on their neighborhood. In June 1993, Focus 2000 proposed a master plan for the Old Vegas site consisting of three hotel-casinos and an RV park. Work on the new project was not expected to start until early 1995, approximately one year after the scheduled completion of a nearby road project to reroute U.S. Route 95. Marnell Corrao Associates was chosen by Focus 2000 as the general contractor for the hotel-casino complex. Zoning changes for the site were approved in September 1993. The project would include a 522-space RV park and three hotels with a total of 4,000 rooms, as well as a convenience store located on three acres, to be known as Old Vegas Convenience Store. Retail space, totaling 160,000 sq ft (15,000 m^{2}), would also be a part of the project. The entire project was expected to be built out gradually over the course of seven to ten years. Residents approved of the project on the condition that Focus 2000 construct a 2,200-foot-long wall to separate the project from the residential neighborhood. Focus 2000 had concerns about obtaining funding for the wall, which was expected to cost over $200,000.

As of 1995, the closed theme park was used only for special occasions. That year, Rio Hotel and Casino Inc. purchased 60 acres of the site as a partner, as part of a strategic growth plan by the company. Rio planned to focus on expanding its eponymous resort, while groundbreaking on the Old Vegas project was planned for a future date. The company had tentative plans for the site to build a hotel-casino with 600 to 700 rooms. A decision on whether to demolish Old Vegas was contingent on the theme of the future project that would be built around it; Rio senior vice president and chief financial officer Harlan Braaten said about Old Vegas, "If we have a western theme, then that might work with the overall plan. But if we decide not to go with a western theme, then it wouldn't fit in."

Because of safety concerns, Old Vegas was demolished in 1997, although the sign was left standing for several years. During 1997, at a cost of $30 million, Focus 2000 put the Old Vegas property up for sale as the potential site of a future casino project. However, real estate brokers and gaming analysts believed the site was in a poor location for such a project. Anthony Marnell II, who owned the Rio and Focus 2000, had plans in 1998 to build a casino on 20 acres of the land, as well as a gas and convenience store on another three acres. The casino would include between 75 and 199 slot machines, and up to nine table games. Flying J was interested in building the truck stop, which was opposed by nearby residents who believed that such a business would be a nuisance. In 2001, the Henderson planning commission and city council approved D. R. Horton to construct a 631-unit housing subdivision on the site. The new housing community retained the Old Vegas name. Construction of the Old Vegas housing project was underway in 2002.

== See also ==
- Bonnie Springs Ranch
