= Abelardo L. Valdez =

American lawyer and diplomat

21st Chief of Protocol of the United States
- In office October 19, 1979 – January 21, 1981
- President: Jimmy Carter
- Preceded by: Edith H. J. Dobelle
- Succeeded by: Leonore Annenberg

Personal details
- Born: Texas
- Education: Texas A&M University (BS); Baylor University (JD); Harvard University (LLM); The Hague Academy of International Law

Abelardo L. Valdez is an American lawyer and diplomat. He is currently the President and Vice Chair of the Council of American Ambassadors. He is also a founder of the Council of American Ambassadors' Fellowship Program, which trains undergraduates for careers in diplomacy and international affairs. He practices international law in Washington, DC and San Antonio, TX.

== Early life ==
Valdez was born in Texas, the son of Mexican-American migrant agricultural laborers. He was involved in agricultural work from a young age in Texas, Montana, North Dakota and South Dakota.

== Career ==
From 1979 to 1981, Ambassador Valdez served as the United States Ambassador and Chief of Protocol of the United States under President Jimmy Carter. He also was the Assistant Administrator for Latin America and the Caribbean of the US Agency for International Development from 1977 to 1979; General Counsel for the Inter-American Foundation from 1973 to 1975; and an attorney for the Overseas Private Investment Corporation from 1971 to 1973. During his military service, he served as a military aide to President Lyndon B. Johnson.

Ambassador Valdez is recognized as one of the original proponents and an architect of the North American Free Trade Agreement. and of a Western Hemisphere Free Trade Area, and served as an advisor on the NAFTA negotiations. He received his LL.M. degree from Harvard Law School, J.D. degree from Baylor Law School and a B.S. degree in civil engineering from Texas A&M University. He also pursued graduate studies in international law at The Hague Academy of International Law in The Netherlands. Valdez served as an editor of the Harvard International Law Journal. He has lectured and written extensively on international trade and investment issues and US-Latin American relations and has been a visiting lecturer or visiting professor at Harvard University, Texas A&M University, Baylor University, Trinity University and the University of Santa Clara.

He is a member of the District of Columbia Bar Association and the State Bar of Texas. He has served, and continues to serve, as a Director or Trustee of various corporate, professional and educational institutions, including the US Chamber of Commerce, the Council of American Ambassadors, the Association for Diplomatic Studies and Training, the Congressional Hispanic Caucus Institute, The American University, Pan American University Foundation, the Center for International Business of Texas A&M University, and the Development Board of the University of Texas Health Science Center. He also served as the Chairman of the International Committee of the Greater Washington Board of Trade, a member of the Rivlin Commission on the Financial Priorities of the District of Columbia, and an honorary member of the US Christopher Columbus Quincentennial Jubilee Commission.

== Awards ==
In addition to his many board affiliations, Ambassador Valdez has received numerous awards for his public service and has been decorated by King Juan Carlos I of Spain with the Order of Isabella the Catholic. He has received the Distinguished Alumnus Award from Baylor University and the Founder's Award of the American GI Forum.

== Personal ==
He resides in Washington, DC, and Floresville, Texas.
