= Frankenstein: The True Story =

1973 film by Jack Smight

- DVD cover
- Based on: Frankenstein by Mary Shelley
- Written by: Don Bachardy; Christopher Isherwood
- Directed by: Jack Smight
- Starring: James Mason; Leonard Whiting; David McCallum; Jane Seymour; Nicola Pagett; Michael Sarrazin
- Theme music composer: Gil Mellé
- Countries of origin: United Kingdom; United States
- Original language: English

Production
- Producers: Ian Lewis; Hunt Stromberg Jr.
- Cinematography: Arthur Ibbetson
- Editor: Richard Marden
- Running time: 182 minutes
- Production company: Universal Television

Original release
- Release: November 30 – December 1, 1973

Frankenstein: The True Story is a 1973 British made-for-television gothic horror science fiction film. It is a reinvention of the 1818 novel Frankenstein; or, The Modern Prometheus by Mary Shelley, about a young anatomy student who seeks the secret of life, creating a vengeful creature in the process. It was directed by Jack Smight, and the screenplay was written by novelist Christopher Isherwood and his longtime partner Don Bachardy.

The film stars Leonard Whiting as Victor Frankenstein, Jane Seymour as Prima, David McCallum as Henry Clerval, James Mason as Dr Polidori and Michael Sarrazin as the Creature. James Mason's wife Clarissa Kaye-Mason appeared in the film.

== Plot ==
After his brother William dies in an accident, newly trained doctor Victor Frankenstein renounces God and starts wishing to be able to revive him. Victor starts studying in London and meets Henry Clerval, who discovered how to restore dead matter to life. Clerval plans to create a new race of perfect beings from the remains of the dead and persuades Victor to help him. They set to work on creating a perfect human, but Clerval dies of a heart attack before the experiment is completed. Victor chooses to honour Clerval by giving their creation Clerval's brain.

Victor brings their experiment to life. He introduces his creation into high-class society, but is shocked to find that there was a flaw in the process used to make him, and the creation's flesh is rapidly decaying. As he deteriorates further, the Creature discovers his deformed appearance and attempts suicide by jumping into the sea. Victor assumes that the Creature is dead.

The Creature washes up on a beach, unharmed and befriends blind peasant Lacey. Lacey introduces his new friend to his granddaughter Agatha and her husband Felix. Terrified by the creature's appearance, Felix attacks him. In the ensuing struggle, the Creature kills Felix. Agatha, fleeing in terror, is struck by a carriage and dies.

The Creature takes Agatha's body back to the laboratory, intent on asking Victor to revive her. Victor, however, has left and the laboratory is now occupied by Dr Polidori, Clerval's former mentor. Polidori plans to create another creature. Meanwhile, Victor has abandoned his experiments and is now married. Polidori blackmails him into assisting with his procedure.

Polidori claims that he was the one who perfected the reanimation of dead flesh, secrets stolen by Clerval. Victor attaches Agatha's head to a new body and they bring to life a female creature, whom Polidori names Prima.

While Victor and his wife Elizabeth Fanshawe are away on their honeymoon, Polidori persuades her family to take Prima in as a house guest. After returning, the couple discovers that Prima is insane, and Elizabeth begs Victor to send her away. Polidori, in turn, agrees to leave with Prima when she becomes an established member of society. Polidori plans to use her as a courtesan to gain international political influence. Before they leave the laboratory, he attempts to destroy the original Creature by having his assistants push him into a vat of acid, but Victor stops them. Polidori locks the Creature in the laboratory and sets the building on fire.

Days later, a ball is held at the Fanshawe mansion to present Prima to the social elite. Prima delights the guests before the badly burned Creature bursts in. He confronts Prima, who attacks him. He decapitates her as guests flee. The next morning, Victor and Elizabeth are questioned by a constable. Polidori has suffered a nervous breakdown and admitted to reanimating Prima. Victor admits to fashioning the Creature from bodies. However, Elizabeth convinces the constable that Victor is deluded, and the police leave. Elizabeth persuades Victor to travel to the United States to begin a new life.

After setting sail, the couple discovers that Polidori is also on the ship. Polidori tries to convince Victor to resume the experiments. Unknown to all, the Creature has stowed away, looking for Victor. Elizabeth sees the Creature hiding in Polidori's cabin and locks the two together. Clerval's mind resurfaced in the Creature, and he plans to have his revenge on Polidori. He ties Polidori to the top of a mast, where the latter is killed by a lightning strike. Victor, attempting to reason with the Creature, is knocked unconscious and falls to the deck. The crew members flee in a lifeboat while the Creature takes care of Victor.

The Creature drives the ship to the North Pole. In Victor's cabin, Elizabeth confronts the Creature, who strangles her. When Victor awakens, he finds Elizabeth's frozen body on deck and the ship locked in ice. He follows the Creature to a cave. As Victor begs the Creature's forgiveness, the sound of his shouts sets off an avalanche. As ice begins to fall upon them, the Creature (in Clerval's voice) forgives Victor, who starts laughing.

== Cast ==
- James Mason as Dr Polidori
- Leonard Whiting as Dr Victor Frankenstein
- David McCallum as Dr Henry Clerval
- Jane Seymour as Agatha Lacey/Prima
- Nicola Pagett as Elizabeth Fanshawe
- Michael Sarrazin as the Creature
- Michael Wilding as Sir Richard Fanshawe
- Clarissa Kaye-Mason as Lady Fanshawe
- Agnes Moorehead as Mrs Blair
- Margaret Leighton as Francoise DuVal
- Ralph Richardson as Mr Lacey
- John Gielgud as Chief Constable
- Tom Baker as Sea Captain
- Julian Barnes as Young Man
- Arnold Diamond as Passenger in Coach
- Yootha Joyce as Hospital Matron
- Peter Sallis as Priest
- Dallas Adams as Felix

== Production ==
The character of Dr Polidori (James Mason), who did not appear in the original novel, was based on the character of Doctor Septimus Pretorius (Ernest Thesiger) from Universal Pictures' Bride of Frankenstein, but named after the real-life John Polidori, an acquaintance of Frankenstein author Mary Shelley who was part of the competition that produced her novel. Polidori's own contribution was the first modern vampire story The Vampyre (1819).

A notable feature of the production is that, instead of being ugly from the start, the Creature (Michael Sarrazin) is portrayed as physically beautiful, but then becoming increasingly hideous as the film progresses. The make-up was by Hammer horror veteran artist Roy Ashton. The film has been described as Sarrazin's most acclaimed efforts of the 1970s.

The film was broadcast on NBC in late 1973 in two 90-minute parts, but often is seen edited into a single film. Its DVD debut date was September 26, 2006. Included at the beginning is a short introduction featuring James Mason wandering through St John's Wood churchyard in London. He suggests that this is where Mary Shelley is buried, which is incorrect (she is in fact buried in the family plot in Dorset) despite standing beside a gravestone bearing her name.

The film's development and production has been detailed extensively in Little Shoppe of Horrors #38 – which was released in June 2017 – by film director/historian Sam Irvin, who served as guest editor on this issue. He has also covered the production of the film in his book The Epic Saga Behind Frankenstein: The True Story, released in 2023.

== Tie-in novel ==
The script for the film by Don Bachardy and Christopher Isherwood was published in paperback as a movie tie-in novel. The script contains a prologue in which Mary Shelley is telling her tale of horror to Percy Bysshe Shelley and Lord George Byron, as John Polidori sulks nearby. As she reaches their parts in the tale, they rush to join the main action and the story begins. It was revealed in Little Shoppe of Horrors #38 that this prologue was filmed, but cut from the movie due to the station bosses fearing it was too slow-moving an opening and may cause viewers to switch off. If this segment had been included, it would have featured Nicola Pagett as Mary, Leonard Whiting as Shelley, David McCallum as Byron, and James Mason as Polidori.

The script contains an epilogue following the avalanche: the season changes, and the northern ice begins to break apart. The Creature's body, still entombed in the remainder of the iceberg, begins to float south into warmer waters. As the ice melts, one of his hands is exposed. Absorbing the rays of the sun, the hand responds, flower-like, and slowly begins to open. This scene was scrapped during production and never filmed, the makers feeling it would undermine the tragedy of the film's ending, and also that it suggested a sequel, whereas the film was always intended to be a standalone.

== Reception ==
Howard Thompson of The New York Times praised the film only for the production visual lavishness, the performances of Leonard Whiting and Nicola Pagett, and noted that the script occasionally reflected Mary Shelley's philosophical themes, but said that it fails to live up to its promise.

Alan Jones of Radio Times gave the film four stars out of five and wrote: "The film is intelligently scripted by Christopher Isherwood and boasts a distinguished cast of supporting players including John Gielgud, Ralph Richardson and a pre-Doctor Who Tom Baker".

Dick Lochte of the Los Angeles Free Press gave the film a positive review saying: "The script is swift and engrossing and rich with mordant wit".

Paul Mavis a reviewer of DVD Talk, said: "Frankenstein: The True Story is a fascinating, rewarding take on the much-reworked Shelley classic. The performances are uniformly fine, and the production is appropriately lush for the epic dimensions. However, the disc presentation is at best, barely adequate, with an only fair picture, and poor sound quality. Horror completists will want it for their collection, and overall, will be satisfied with their purchase; curious newcomers to the film should rent it first".

== See also ==
- List of films featuring Frankenstein's monster
