= Gaumont-British =

British film company, 1898–1962

The Gaumont-British Picture Corporation was a British company that produced and distributed films and operated a cinema chain in the United Kingdom. It was established in 1898 as an offshoot of France's Gaumont. In 1941 it became part of The Rank Organisation and was merged into The Rank Organisation in 1962.

== Early history and film production ==
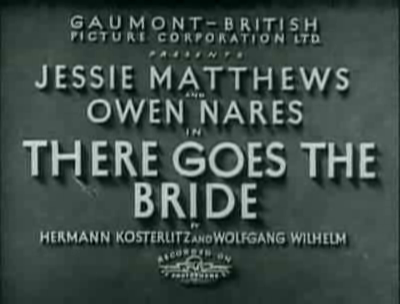
Title screen for There Goes the Bride (1932)

Gaumont-British was founded in 1898 as the British subsidiary of the French film studio Gaumont.

In 1910, Gaumont Graphic Studios were at Shepherds Bush, in London.

In 1914, the Gaumont-British film studios were opened, then completely rebuilt for sound, re-opening on 29 June 1932.

"Gaumont Graphic newsreels were exhibited as part of larger cinema programmes from 1910 to 1932, when Gaumont Sound News was launched (superseded by Gaumont British News in 1934)."

Gaumont's British subsidiary became independent of its French parent in 1922 when Isidore Ostrer acquired control of Gaumont-British. In 1927 the Ideal Film Company, a leading silent film maker, merged with Gaumont. Gaumont-British Pictures Corporation was formed in 1927.

The company's Lime Grove Studios was used for film productions, including Alfred Hitchcock's adaptation of The 39 Steps (1935), while its Islington Studios made Hitchcock's The Lady Vanishes (1938). In the 1930s, the company employed 16,000 people. During her first attempt in 1933 at circumnavigation of the UK, kayaker Fridel Meyer gave lectures about her journey at various landing places, for the Gaumont-British Picture Corporation.

Michael Balcon later reflected that although the years of 1934 and 1935 produced films such as The Thirty-Nine Steps and Tudor Rose "on the whole our films in those years were not as good as they should have been, and they were costing more than they should have." He felt it might have been different if the studio "had a sufficiently powerful and effective global selling organisation" and also that the decision to import American stars and directors was not worth it, artistically or financially.

In the United States, Gaumont-British had its own distribution operation for its films until December 1938, when it outsourced distribution to 20th Century Fox. Key figures at the studio included Edward Black.

== Cinemas ==
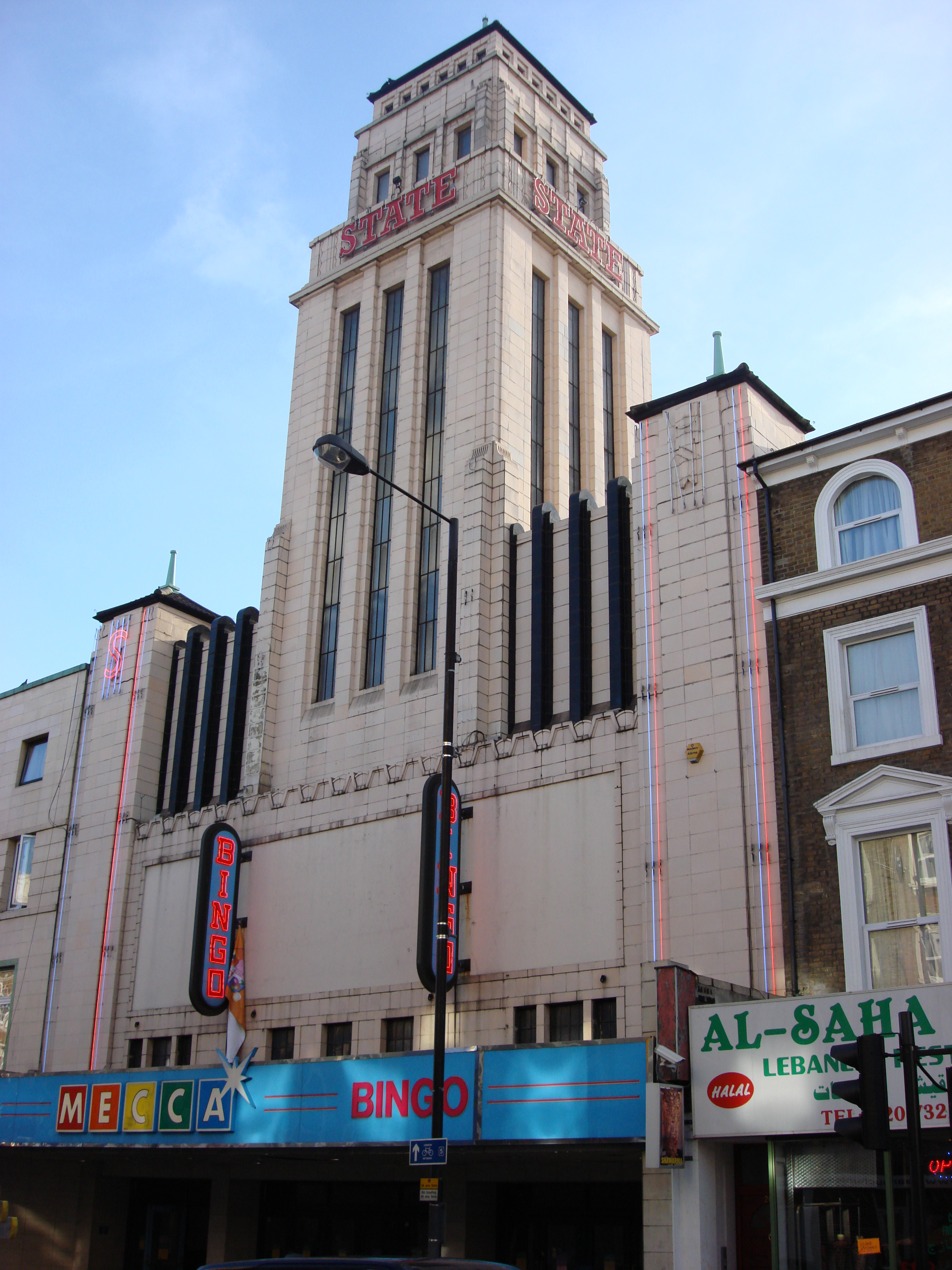
The former Gaumont State Cinema in Kilburn, London, opened in 1937

Gaumont-British acquired General Theatre Corporation in 1928 and acquired control of Provincial Cinematograph Theatres in 1929.

Gaumont-British were the first large British cinema chain controlling 180 cinemas by 1928 and up to 300 the following year.

Fox Film Corporation indirectly acquired shares in the company to help with the expansion. Gaumont-British developed or acquired large "super-cinemas". The New Victoria (later Gaumont and finally Odeon) in Bradford opened in 1930, the Gaumont in Manchester opened in 1935, and the Gaumont State Cinema in Kilburn, London, opened in 1937. They also took over many smaller cinemas across the country, eventually owning 343 properties. One such property was the Holderness Hall in Hull, built by the pioneering William Morton in 1912 and managed by him until 1930, when he could no longer compete.

Many of the Gaumont cinemas had a theatre organ for entertainment before the show, in the intervals, or after the show. The name "Gaumont" was adopted to describe the style of the flat-top organ console case (originally for the Pavilion Theatre, Shepherd's Bush), for some Compton organs built from October 1931 to 1934.

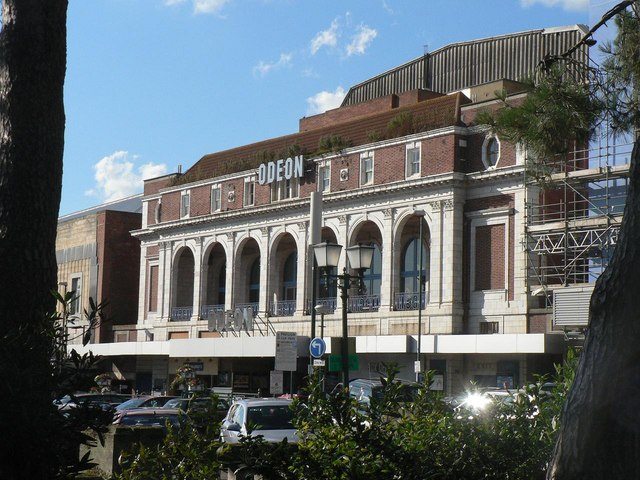
The Odeon, Westover Road, Bournemouth was a Gaumont until 1986

Cinema exhibition in the UK was characterised by alignments between exhibitors and distributors. After the Odeon and Gaumont takeovers, Rank had access to the product of 20th Century-Fox, Paramount, Walt Disney, Columbia, Universal, United Artists, Samuel Goldwyn, RKO, Alexander Korda's London Films, Republic Pictures, British Lion Films, and its own film productions. Rivals ABC had only Warner Bros., MGM, Monogram Pictures, and the productions of its parent company Associated British Picture Corporation (ABPC). Both cinema circuits also took films from smaller distributors. With ample supply of product, Rank maintained the separate Odeon and Gaumont release pattern for many years. Some Odeon cinemas were renamed Gaumont when transferred to Gaumont release.

In 1948, Rank merged the management and booking operations of Odeon and Gaumont. As attendances declined during the 1950s, many cinemas on all circuits were closed and eventually the booking power of the Gaumont circuit declined. In January 1959, Rank restructured its exhibition operation and combined the best Gaumonts and the best Odeons in a new Rank release, while the rest were given a new "National" release. In 1961, Paramount objected to Rank consigning its Dean Martin comedy All in a Night's Work to the national circuit and henceforth switched its allegiance to the ABC circuit. With the continuing decline in attendance and cinema numbers, the National release died on its feet and henceforth there were two release patterns, Rank and ABC. There was no reason to perpetuate the Gaumont name, and in towns that lost their Odeon, the Gaumont was usually renamed Odeon within a couple of years of the latter's closure. Even so, the Gaumont name continued to linger until, in January 1987, the last Gaumont, in Doncaster, was renamed Odeon.

== Other operations ==
In 1940, Gaumont-British acquired Cinema-Television. In 1945, Cinema-Television acquired Bush Radio.

In 1948, Gaumont-British acquired British Optical and Precision Engineers (BOPE), which in turn, acquired Taylor, Taylor & Hobson, Kalee and British Acoustic Films. In 1956, BOPE was renamed Rank Precision Industries.

=== G.B.-Kershaw and G.B.-Kalee ===
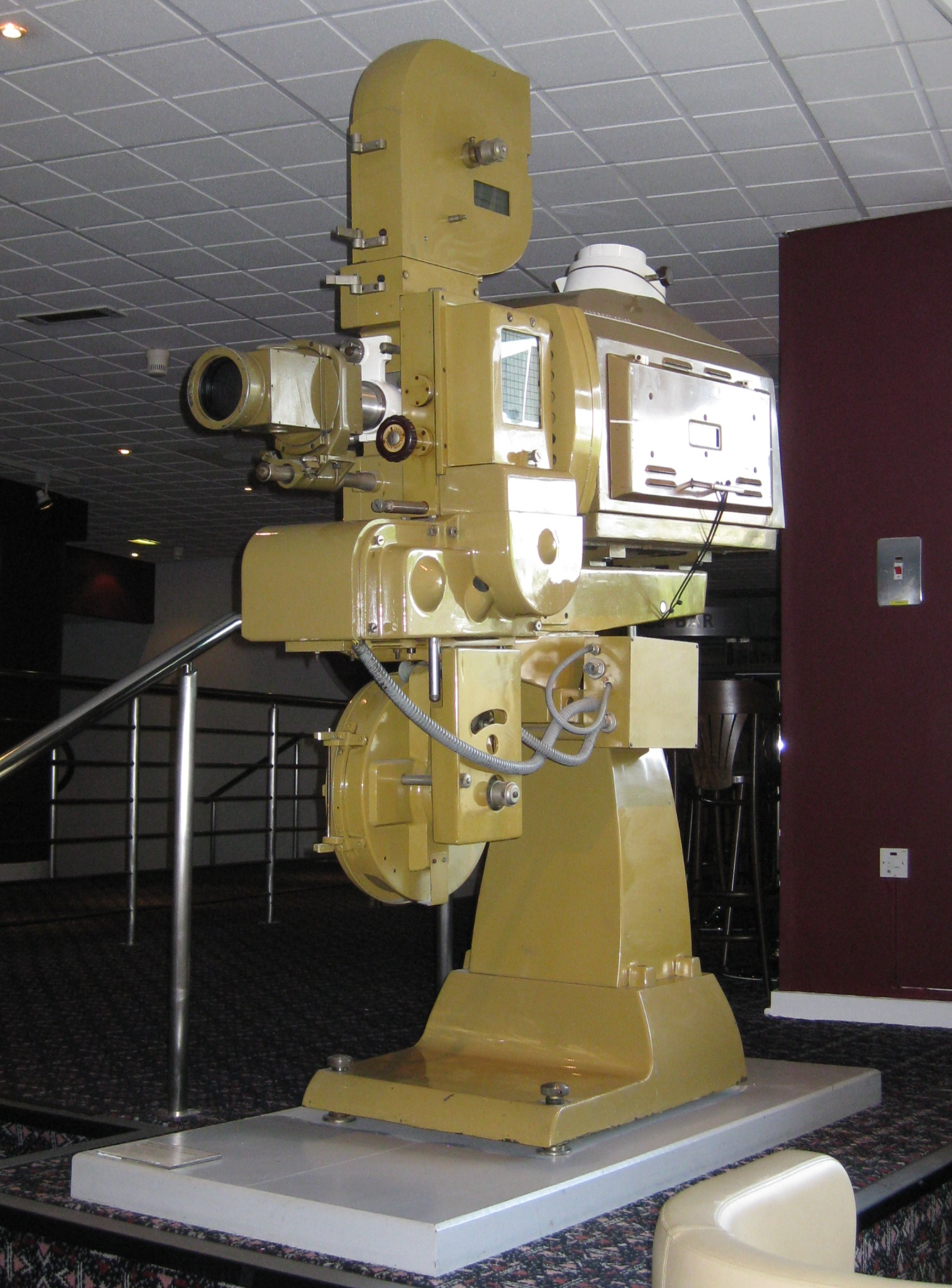
Gaumont-Kalee GK21 35mm cine film projector, National Media Museum, Bradford

In 1888 Abram Kershaw established a business in Leeds making photographic items, including lanterns and projection equipment. Kershaw produced cinema projectors under the Kalee trade name (from the initials of Kershaw, A, Leeds) from the 1910s. Later, the company became part of Amalgamated Photographic Manufacturers, forming the Kershaw-Soho Ltd group.

The brand Kalee continued to be used until the Kershaw group was acquired by Gaumont British to become G.B.-Kalee Ltd. Both GB-Kershaw and GB-Kalee were used as brand names for a range of 8-mm and 16-mm cine-cameras, movie projectors, slide projectors and still cameras. G.B.-Kalee was also the distributor in the United Kingdom for the 16-mm and 35-mm Arriflex cinema cameras, as well as a range of professional cinema projectors and sound equipment under the brand name Gaumont-Kalee.

=== G.B. Equipments Ltd and G.B.-Bell and Howell ===
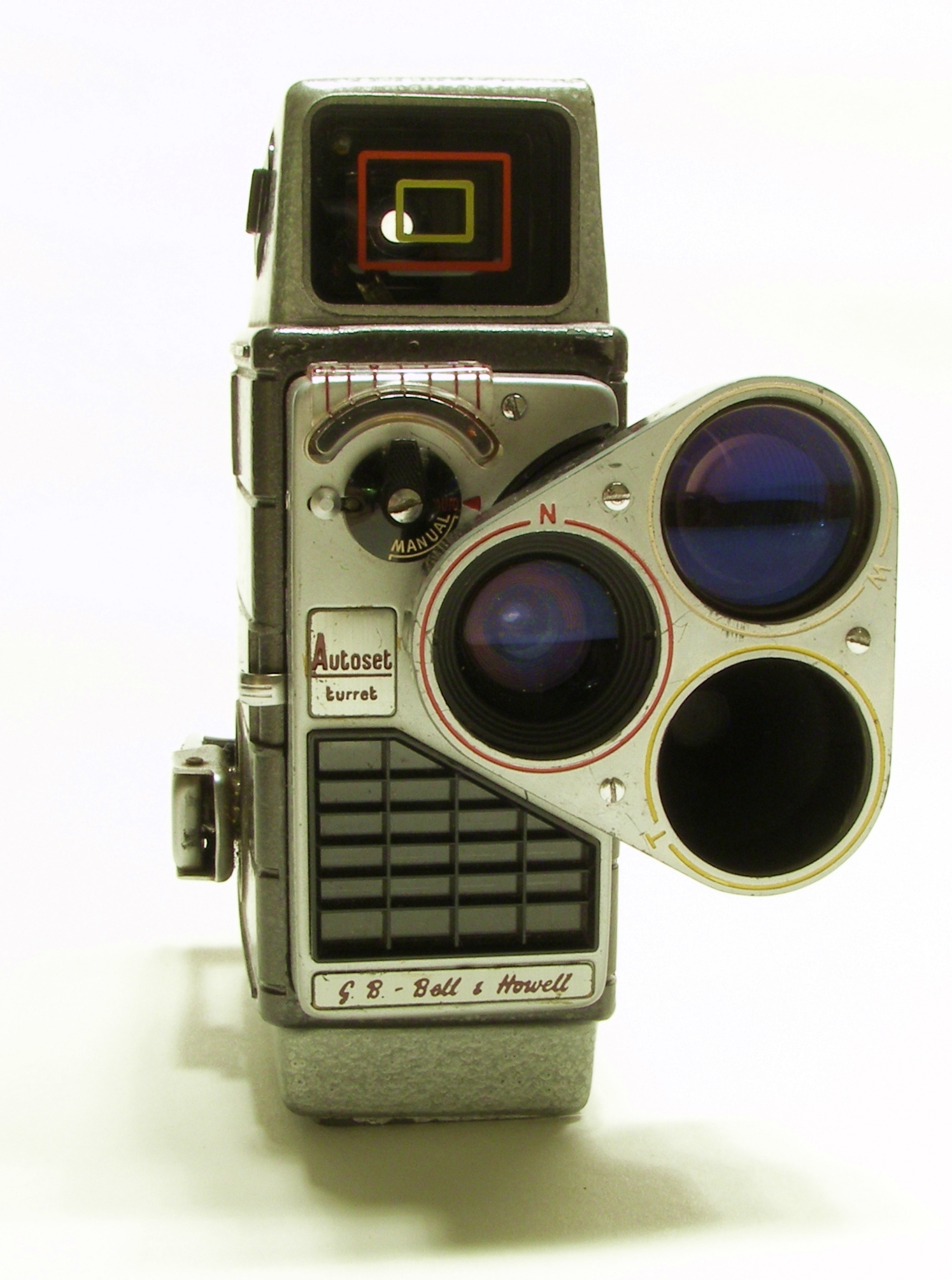
G.B-Bell & Howell Autoset Turret 8mm film camera

G.B. Equipments Ltd, a subsidiary of Gaumont-British, made a number of 16-mm film sound projectors in Britain before and during the Second World War, including models such as the G.B.-Scope A and B, Grosvenor and G.B. K and L series.

After the war, G.B. Equipments Ltd decided not to manufacture models of its own. Instead they began to manufacture, under licence, models of American design by Bell & Howell. These models, branded as either G.B.-Bell & Howell or Bell & Howell-Gaumont in Great Britain, were identical to the American models except in model number. During the 1950s G.B.-Bell & Howell either manufactured or distributed a number of 8 mm and 16 mm cine-cameras and projectors.

== Ownership ==
In 1929, Metropolis and Bradford Trust, controlled by Isidore Ostrer and his brothers, acquired control of Gaumont-British.

In 1941 The Rank Organisation bought control of Metropolis and Bradford, via General Cinema Finance Corporation, and its sister company Gainsborough Pictures. Rank also took control over rival cinema chain Odeon Cinemas the same year.

In 1962, 20th Century Fox acquired an interest in Metropolis and Bradford and Gaumont-British was merged with The Rank Organisation.

Gaumont-British and its sister company Gainsborough Pictures are now owned by Gregory Motton.

== See also ==
- List of Gainsborough Pictures films
