= Beldon Katleman =

American businessman

- Born: July 14, 1914; Sioux City, Iowa, U.S.
- Died: September 28, 1988 (aged 74); Bel Air, Los Angeles, California, U.S.
- Resting place: Hillside Memorial Park Cemetery
- Education: University of California, Los Angeles
- Occupation: Businessman
- Spouse: Leonore Cohn
- Children: 1

Beldon Katleman (July 14, 1914 – September 28, 1988) was an American businessman. Katleman bought into a partnership in El Rancho Vegas, a hotel casino in Las Vegas, Nevada and became president of the hotel. Katleman was an investor in two other Las Vegas casinos, the Hotel Last Frontier and the Silver Slipper.

== Early life ==
Beldon Katleman was born to an affluent Jewish family on July 14, 1914, in Sioux City, Iowa. The family moved to Southern California in the 1930s and he graduated from the University of California, Los Angeles. His parents owned the Circle K national chain of parking lots and owned real estate in Los Angeles. During World War II, Katleman served as a lieutenant in the motion picture division of the Signal Corps in the U.S. Army.

== Career ==
In 1949, he moved to Las Vegas, Nevada, where his uncle Jake had an interest in the El Rancho Vegas, and he became a junior partner in the hotel. When his uncle died, Katleman bought out the other partners and became sole owner in 1953, becoming the youngest gaming entrepreneur at the time.

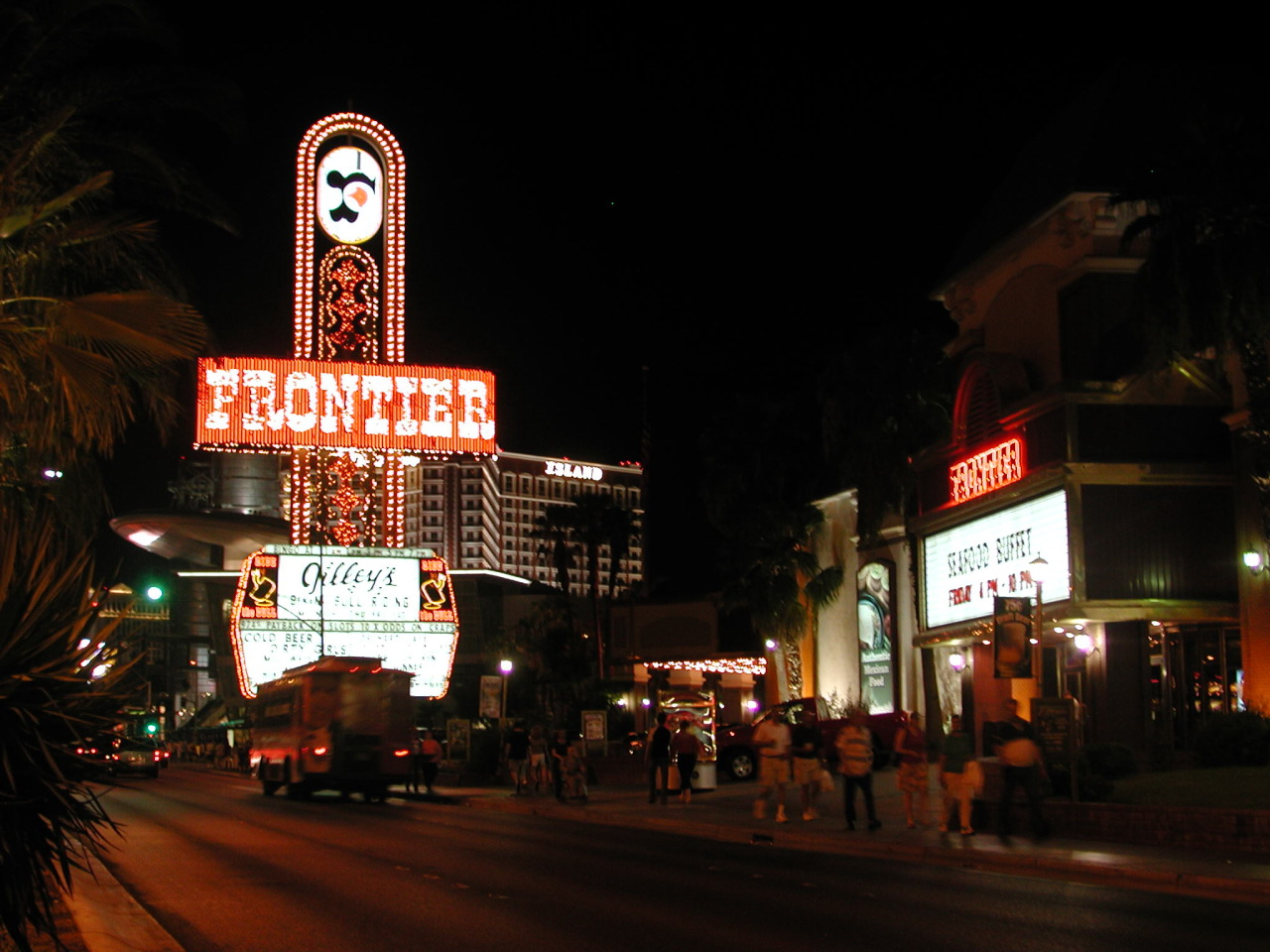
The Last Frontier Hotel and Casino.

With Guy McAfee and Jake Kozloff, Katleman acquired the Hotel Last Frontier from Bill Moore for US$5.5 million in 1951. He succeeded Kozloff as its manager in 1955. He ceased to be a co-owner in 1957.

In June 1960, El Rancho Vegas was destroyed by a fire and Katleman immedialtely left Las Vegas. He planned to build a highrise on the site but the plans did not materialise and Howard Hughes bought the property in 1968.

Katleman was an investor in the Silver Slipper, another casino in Las Vegas, alongside Jack Barenfeld, Norma Friedman, Irving Leff and T.W. Richardson. After leasing it to Howard Hughes since 1968, they sued Hughes over a year's unpaid rents in 1974.

In April 1988, the Senate Revenue and Taxation Committee Senate reviewed the "murky" settlement of taxes Katleman may have owed to the state of California in the 1960s.

== Personal life ==
In January 1941, Katleman married Leonore Cohn, whom he had met at the Hillcrest Country Club, the Jewish golf club in Los Angeles; Leonore was the niece of Columbia Pictures founder Harry Cohn. In 1942, They had a daughter named Diane Katleman Deshong. They resided in Beverly Hills, California. The couple separated in 1944 and divorced soon after; she married Lewis Rosenstiel in 1946.

== Death ==
Katleman died on September 28, 1988, in Bel Air, Los Angeles, California. He was buried at the Hillside Memorial Park Cemetery in Culver City, California.
