= All-you-can-eat restaurant =

Restaurant model based on a single price for any amount of food

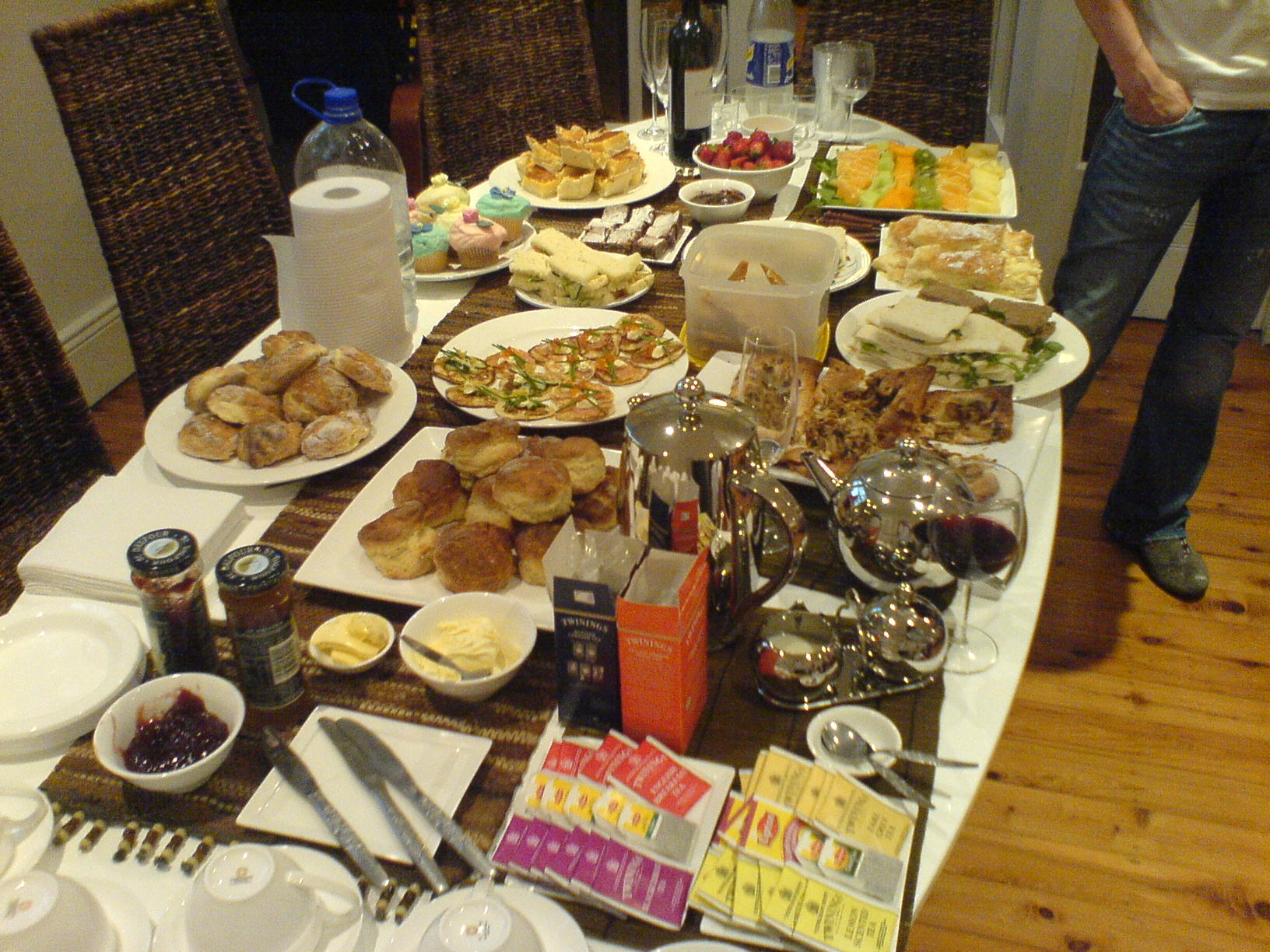
Swedish smörgåsbord buffet

An all-you-can-eat restaurant (AYCE) is a type of restaurant in which a fixed price is charged for entry, after which diners may consume as much food as they wish. Self-service buffets are a common type of all-you-can-eat establishment, but some AYCE restaurants instead provide waiter service based on an unlimited series of written orders for specific foods.

== Buffets ==
The concept of an all-you-can-eat buffet has been attributed to Herb McDonald, a Las Vegas publicity and entertainment manager who introduced the idea in 1946.

A 2011 study showed that the amount of food consumed increases with the price charged for the buffet.

== See also ==
- Free refill
- Smorgasbord
