= Herb McDonald =

Herbert Cobb McDonald (March 15, 1919 – July 6, 2002) was a Las Vegas promoter and publicist who is credited with pioneering the all-you-can-eat buffet in Las Vegas casinos, bringing The Beatles to the city, leading the group that persuaded the National Finals Rodeo to relocate there, and establishing a major golf tournament.

== Early life ==
He was born in Edmonton, Alberta, Canada. His father was a friend of baseball Hall-of-Famer Ty Cobb, hence his middle name. The family moved to California. After graduating from Pasadena Junior College in 1939, he enrolled at Stanford University. However, World War II intervened. He became a United States Navy aviator and trained pilots as a lieutenant for three years.

== Career ==
After the war ended in 1945, he worked as a promoter for Music Corporation of America. Among his duties was booking acts for the El Rancho hotel and casino, including Peggy Lee in January 1946; she invited him to her opening, where the resort's owner offered him a job as the entertainment director.

According to McDonald, while working late one night, he got some food from the kitchen and laid it out on a bar to make himself a sandwich; this attracted hungry gamblers, giving rise to a Las Vegas staple: the buffet. The first cost either $1.25 or $1.

In 1954, he became the youngest Chamber of Commerce director in the nation, heading the Las Vegas chamber for three years, beginning at the age of 32. He also became Bureau of State Development and the Nevada Chamber of Commerce Executives Association.

In 1957, he went to work for the Sahara as director of promotion and publicity, a job he would hold until 1975. An avid golfer, he traveled to England to watch the 1964 British Open. While there, he saw The Beatles perform at The Talk of the Town nightclub in London. He booked them for two performances at the Las Vegas Convention Center in August; they stayed at the Sahara. His love of golf also led to the establishment of the Sahara Pro-Am tournament (later renamed the Sahara Invitational), first played in 1958.

In March 1982, he became director of Las Vegas Events Inc. As its president, he played a large role in luring the National Finals Rodeo away from its 20-year stay in Oklahoma City to attract visitors in the traditionally slow month of December; the December 1984 vote was tied six to six, with Professional Rodeo Cowboys Association president Shawn Davis casting the deciding vote.
