= Isidore Ostrer =

British businessman (1889–1975)

Isidore Ostrer (1889–1975) was a banker, financier, poet, newspaper owner, and film studio owner in England. His father, Nathan Ostrer, was a jewellery salesman who emigrated from the Russian Empire. In addition to assembling a media empire he wrote poetry and authored an economics text.

Ostrer was born in London's East End. He began his career in the textile industry before establishing two banks with his brothers Mark and Maurice. They financed film industry businesses and Ostrer acquired control of Gaumont-British Picture Corporation from its French parent Gaumont in 1922. He sold it to J. Arthur Rank in 1941. Ostrer also owned a newspaper (Sunday Referee) and textile business (Amalgamated Textiles).

He moved to the U.S. during World War II. His daughter became actress Pamela Mason. Morgan Mason is his grandson. His son was Vivian Kaye (Kiki) Osborne, ne Ostrer. He had two other daughters, Sheila Thompson and Diana Ostrer.

A painting of Isidore Ostrer by Howard Coster is in the National Portrait Gallery.

Nigel Ostrer wrote The Ostrers and Gaumont British, a book about the family and their involvement in the film studios.
