= Harvard International Law Journal =

- Discipline: International law
- Language: English

Publication details
- History: 1959 – Present
- Publisher: Harvard Law School (United States)
- Frequency: Biannual

Standard abbreviations
- Bluebook: Harv. Int'l L.J.
- ISO 4: Harv. Int. Law J.

Indexing
- ISSN: 0017-8063
- OCLC no.: 1796621

Links
- Journal homepage

The Harvard International Law Journal is a biannual academic journal of international law, run and edited by students at Harvard Law School. The Journal is "the oldest and most-cited student-edited journal of international law." The Journal was ranked as one of the 10 most influential law journals in the world, based on research influence and impact factors, by the 2011 Journal Citation Reports.

The Journal covers international, comparative, and foreign law, the role of international law in United States courts, and the international ramifications of U.S. domestic law. It also publishes student-written work on recent developments in international law and reviews of new books in the field.

Articles from the Journal have been cited in decisions by the Supreme Court of the United States, European Court of Justice, International Court of Justice, Iran-United States Claims Tribunal, and World Trade Organization Dispute Panels.

The Journal's website includes the Harvard International Law Journal Online, which publishes shorter articles written by scholars, practitioners, and law students, and the ILJ Digest, a continuously updated blog of developments in international law.

The Journal also hosts various speakers and symposia.
