= Leonore Annenberg =

American businesswoman (1918–2009)

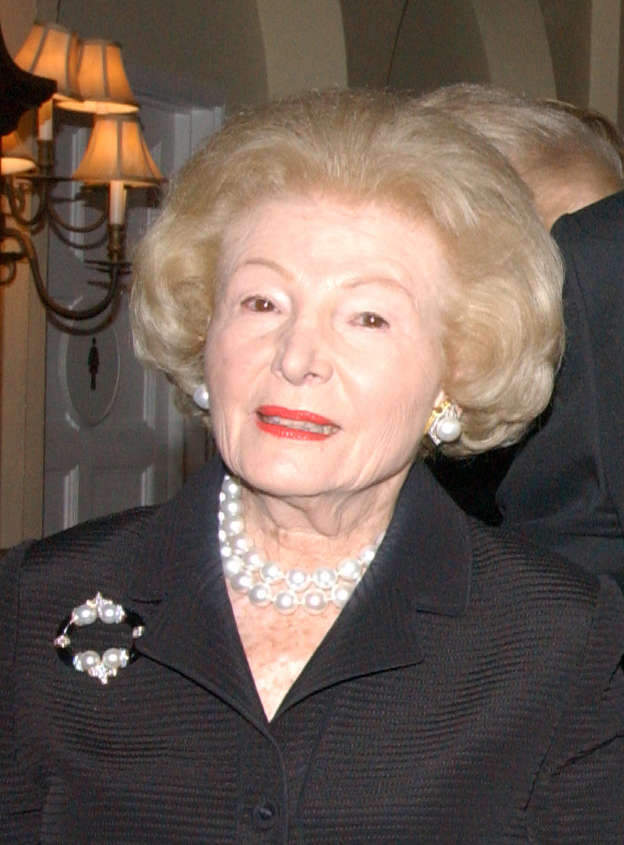

22nd Chief of Protocol of the United States
- In office March 20, 1981 – January 6, 1982
- President: Ronald Reagan
- Preceded by: Abelardo L. Valdez
- Succeeded by: Selwa Roosevelt

Personal details
- Born: Leonore Cohn; February 20, 1918 New York City, U.S.
- Died: March 12, 2009 (aged 91) Rancho Mirage, California, U.S.
- Resting place: Sunnylands
- Spouse(s): Beldon Katleman (divorced); Lewis Rosenstiel (divorced) Walter Annenberg (m. 1951; died 2002)
- Children: 2
- Relatives: Jack Cohn (uncle); Harry Cohn (uncle)
- Occupation: Businesswoman, diplomat, philanthropist
- Website: Annenberg Foundation

Leonore Cohn Annenberg (February 20, 1918 – March 12, 2009), also known as Lee Annenberg, was an American businesswoman, diplomat, and philanthropist. She was Chief of Protocol of the United States from 1981 to 1982. Annenberg was married to Walter Annenberg, who was an ambassador to the United Kingdom and newspaper publisher. She was the chairman and president of the Annenberg Foundation from 2002 to 2009.

Born in New York City and raised in Los Angeles, she graduated from Stanford University. After her first two marriages ended in divorce, she married noted businessman Walter Annenberg, who was appointed U.S. Ambassador to the United Kingdom in 1969 under President Richard Nixon. In her role as the ambassador's wife, Leonore directed a major renovation of the ambassador's official residence. The Annenbergs contributed to Ronald Reagan's 1980 presidential campaign and upon his inauguration, Leonore was named Chief of Protocol, placing her in charge of advising the president, vice president, and Secretary of State on matters relating to diplomatic protocol.

The Annenbergs became major philanthropists, donating money to education facilities, charitable causes, and the arts. Leonore Annenberg was on many committees and boards as well. After her husband's death in 2002, she continued to donate money and succeeded him as chairman and president of the Annenberg Foundation.

== Early life and family ==
Leonore Cohn was born into a Jewish family in New York City on February 20, 1918, to Maxwell and Clara Cohn. Nicknamed "Lee", her father operated a textile business. She was seven years old when her mother died. She and her younger sister were raised in Fremont Place, an upper-class neighborhood of Los Angeles, by her uncle Harry Cohn, the founder of Columbia Pictures. Leonore and her younger sister, Judith, attended the Page Boarding School for Girls in Pasadena. Harry Cohn's wife, Rose, raised the girls as Christian Scientists.

Leonore Cohn graduated from Stanford University in 1940 with a bachelor's degree. After graduating, she married Beldon Katleman, whose family owned real estate and a national parking lot chain; they had a daughter, Diane, but the marriage ended in divorce after a few years. In 1946, she married Lewis Rosenstiel, the multimillionaire founder of the Schenley liquor distillery, and they had a daughter named Elizabeth; that marriage, too, ended in divorce.

She and Walter Annenberg, then editor of The Philadelphia Inquirer, met in 1950 at a party in Florida and married the following year.

== Ambassador's wife ==
Upon her husband's appointment as the United States Ambassador to the United Kingdom in 1969, Mrs. Annenberg ordered a renovation of the thirty-five room Winfield House, the ambassador's official London residence. The total cost of the project was about US$1 million and took six months to complete. While in London, Leonore founded the American Friends of Covent Garden, an organization designed to foster goodwill between the U.S. and the U.K. through musical expression.

== Chief of Protocol ==
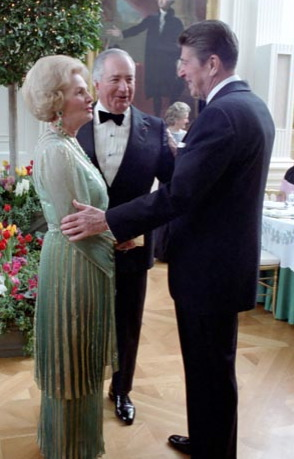
Walter and Leonore Annenberg with President Ronald Reagan, 1981

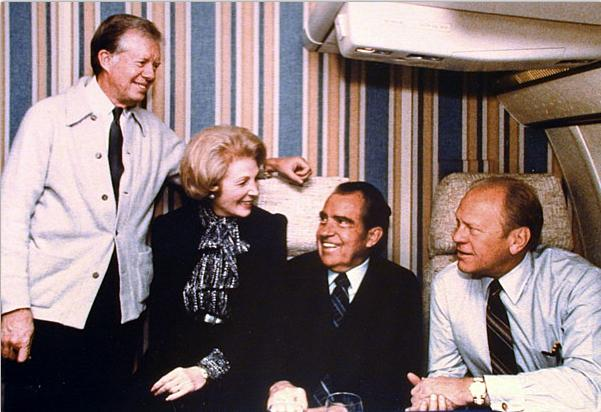
Annenberg with former Presidents Nixon, Ford, and Carter during a flight to the funeral of Anwar Sadat, October 1981

The Annenbergs contributed substantially to Ronald Reagan's 1980 presidential campaign, and upon his election in 1981, Lee Annenberg was named as Chief of Protocol of the United States. This position placed her in charge of advising the President, Vice President, and Secretary of State on matters dealing with diplomatic protocol, and formally welcoming foreign dignitaries upon their arrival to the United States. Annenberg oversaw a staff of 60 who worked on myriad details, ranging from the choice of state gifts to be given to the guest, to the bathrooms the foreign delegation may visit. She said of her position, "It's all about making your guests feel respected and welcome". Annenberg attracted some controversy during her tenure when she curtsied before the visiting Prince Charles upon arriving for a diplomatic visit, commentators saying it was unseemly in a republic which gained its independence from the same monarchy.

As Chief of Protocol, she achieved the rank of Ambassador. Friends of Ronald and Nancy Reagan, the Annenbergs hosted the Reagans annually at their Rancho Mirage, California, estate, "Sunnylands". Annenberg resigned her post in January 1982, stating that she wanted to spend more time with her husband.

== Philanthropy and committee work ==
After leaving her post at the State Department, Lee Annenberg began work to promote and enhance cultural appreciation in the United States. She and her husband continued to donate money to worthy causes as philanthropists. In 2001, Annenberg was awarded the Andrew Carnegie Medal of Philanthropy. Upon being presented the award, she explained why she and her husband donated to causes as philanthropists:

Walter and I believe that education is the foundation of a democratic society. When asked what motivates his philanthropic work, my husband has responded with a very powerful statement: 'I regard my philanthropic work as an investment in the future of America. It is the most effective way I can serve my country and help to ensure its benefits for the next generation.'

Mrs. Annenberg served many charitable organizations and on many committees. Stemming from her interest in and endowments to the arts, she was a trustee emerita and a member of the Acquisitions Committee of the Metropolitan Museum of Art, member of the board of trustees of the Philadelphia Museum of Art, one of the managing directors of The Metropolitan Opera, honorary trustee and former board president of the Palm Springs Art Museum, and a member of the American Philosophical Society. Mrs. Annenberg was chairwoman emerita of the Foundation of Art and Preservation in Embassies, and a member of the Committee for the Preservation of the White House.

She was also a member of the Distinguished Daughters of Pennsylvania and an active trustee emeritus of the University of Pennsylvania. She served on the governing boards of both Annenberg Schools for Communication. In 1993, she and her husband, Walter, were awarded the National Medal of Arts. She was elected a Fellow of the American Academy of Arts and Sciences in 2004.

== Later life ==
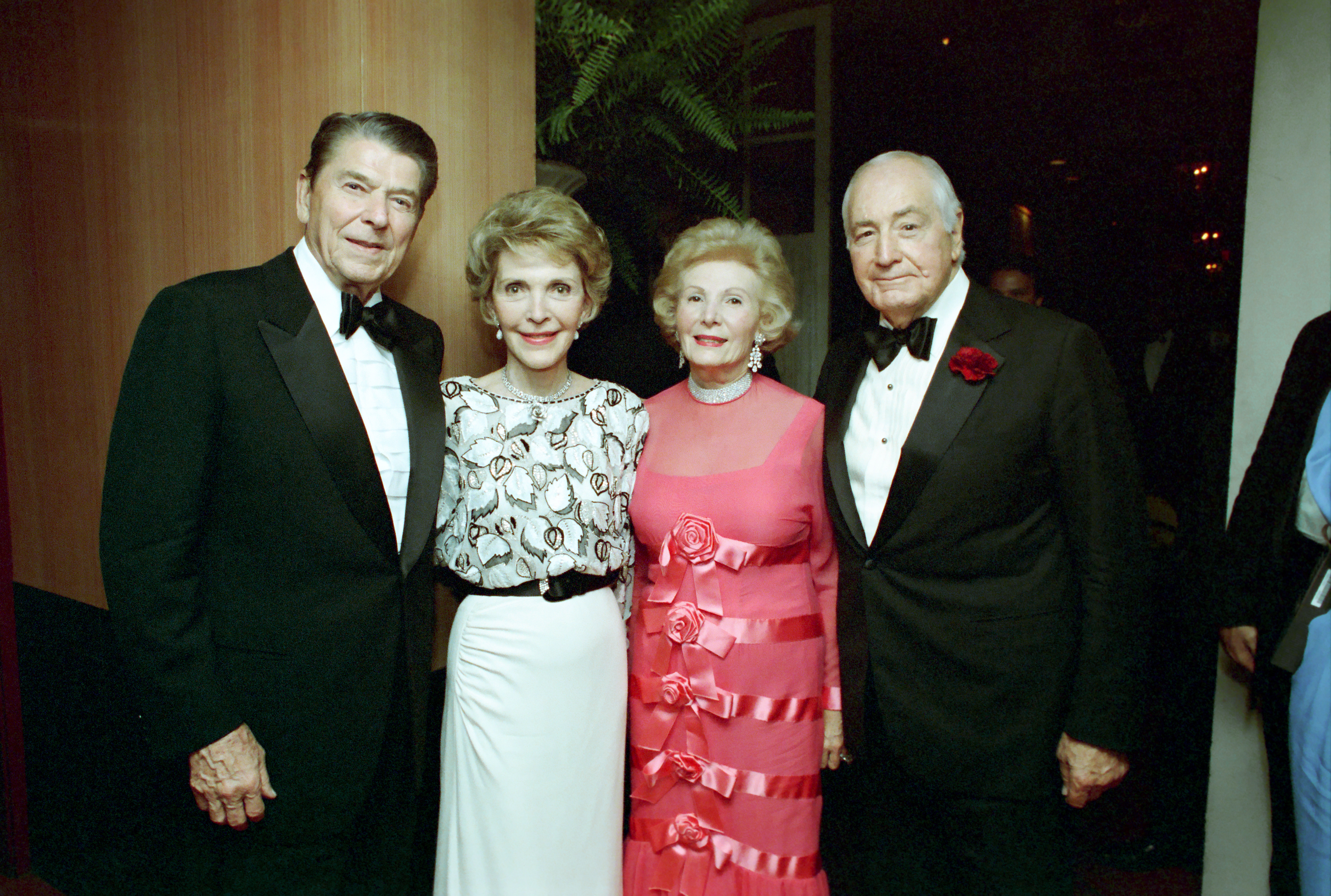
Leonore and Walter Annenberg with President Ronald Reagan and Nancy Reagan, 1988.

Walter Annenberg died on October 1, 2002, aged 94. Lee Annenberg succeeded her husband as chairman and president of the Annenberg Foundation, an organization founded by her late husband which funds nonprofit organizations as well as education institutes and programs of the arts. She continued to donate money to worthy causes in the fields of science, education, and art until her death. In 2006, she was ranked as the 382nd wealthiest person in the world by Forbes magazine, and the 488th in 2007. Annenberg, in 2007, was the 165th richest person in the United States, according to Forbes, with a net worth of 2.5 billion dollars. Annenberg traveled to Washington, D.C., in May 2007 to attend the state dinner for Queen Elizabeth II, hosted by President George W. Bush. The following month, she accepted the prestigious Philadelphia Award, an honor given to those in the Philadelphia region who worked to better the area.

Most recently before her death, Annenberg became an honorary board member of the Richard Nixon Foundation and an honorary fellow of the Royal Academy of Arts.

== Death ==
Lee Annenberg resided in Rancho Mirage, California, prior to her death on March 12, 2009, aged 91. According to a family spokesperson, Leonore Annenberg died at Eisenhower Medical Center of natural causes. At the time of her death, Annenberg had been in declining health.

At the announcement of her death, statements were issued by former president George H. W. Bush and Barbara Bush, as well as former first lady Nancy Reagan, who called Annenberg "a dear and longtime friend" and praised the Annenbergs' philanthropic work as having "left an indelible print on education in the United States".

== See also ==
- Annenberg Public Policy Center

Diplomatic posts
Preceded by Abelardo L. Valdez	U.S. Chief of Protocol; 1981–1982	Succeeded by Selwa Roosevelt
