= Free refill =

Drink that can be filled again for free after being consumed

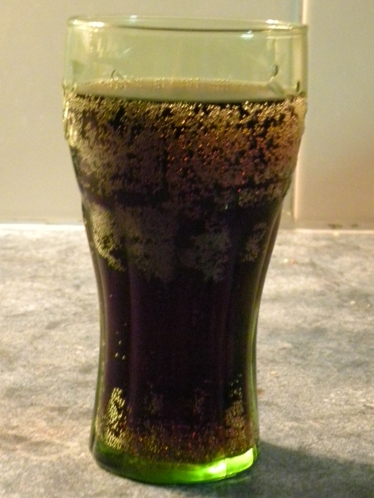
A glass of soda from a soda fountain.

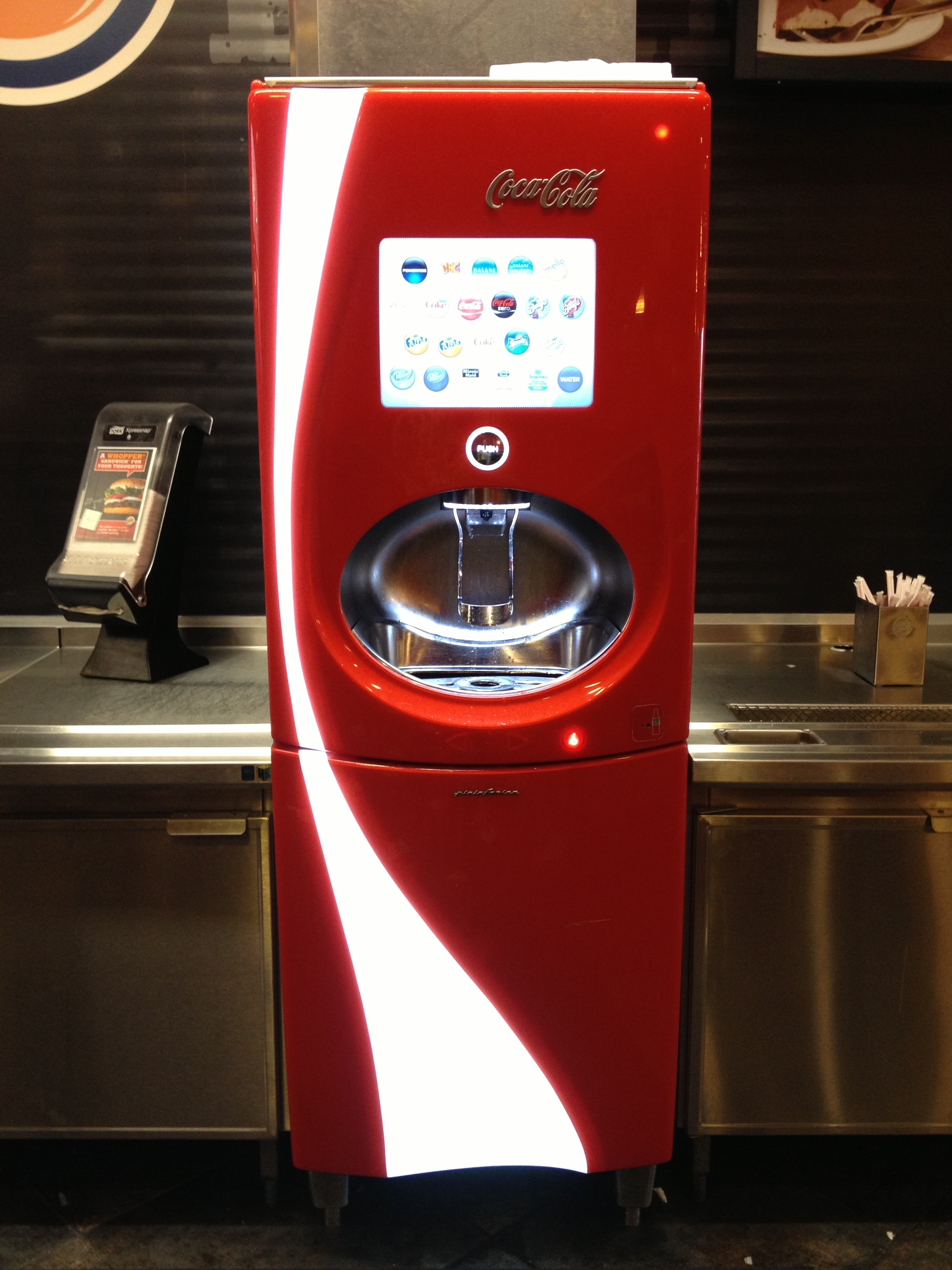
A modern self-service soda fountain at a popular fast-food chain.

Free refills occur when a drink's receptacle, usually that of a soft drink, tea or coffee, is allowed to be filled again by its purchaser, free of charge, after they have consumed the drink. Occasionally the glass or cup holding the drink is not reused, and the "refill" actually constitutes the acquisition of a second (or more than one) additional entirely new drink(s) for no added charge, usually of the same kind (e.g. the same brand of soft drink) as the original, paid-for drink. Free refills are commonplace in the United States and Canada in traditional restaurants and fast food restaurants, while rarer in airports, cafés, or service stations. Around the world, the availability of free refills is typically scarce, but varies widely depending on the country and the type and specific ownership or chain of each establishment.

== History ==
According to the book The World of Caffeine: The Science and Culture of the World's Most Popular Drug, free refills were common in American coffeehouses by the 1890s. This was considered a noteworthy feature of American cafés by Europeans, in whose countries coffee was not as popular and free refills were not available. The author speculates this may be due to the higher price of coffee in Europe at the time, and the accumulating cost to the café of the refills.

== Marketing ==
Free refills are seen as a good way to attract customers to an establishment, especially one whose beverages are not their primary source of income. Due to the extremely low cost of fountain soft drinks (especially the beverage itself, not including the cost of the cup, lid and straw), often offering a profit margin of 80-82%, establishments tend to offer free refills as a sales gimmick. Coffee produces a similar high profit margin, allowing establishments to include coffee in free refill offers. Most of these establishments have fast customer turnover, thus customers rarely consume enough beverage to make the offering unprofitable. Some establishments, who make their primary income with beverage sales, only offer free refills to members of rewards programs.

== Criticisms ==
=== United States ===
In certain areas of the United States, such as Massachusetts and New York, politicians have proposed banning free refills as a move against obesity.

When New York City banned sugary drinks over 16 ounces in 2012, critics faulted free refills as one of the ban's biggest weaknesses.

In June 2012 Cambridge, Massachusetts, mayor Henrietta Davis unsuccessfully proposed banning soft drink refills.

=== France ===
The French government is another critic of free refills, due to health concerns about obesity. France created a tax on sugary drinks in 2011. In September 2014, Serge Hercberg, head of France's National Nutrition and Health Programme, stated that free refills of sugary drinks should be banned. In January 2017, a law was passed banning the unlimited sale of pop and other sugary drinks at all public eateries.

== See also ==
- Refill (scheme)
- All-you-can-eat restaurant
