= William Spier =

American film director (1906–1973)

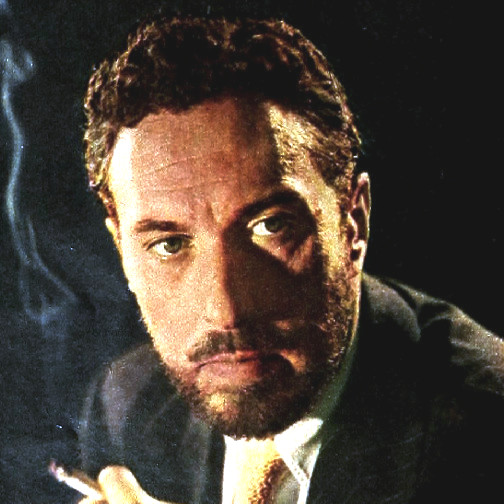
- Spier in 1949
- Born: William Hannan Spier; October 16, 1906; New York City, U.S.
- Died: May 30, 1973 (aged 66); Weston, Connecticut, U.S.
- Occupations: Writer, producer, director
- Spouses: Mary Scanlan (m. 1929; div. 1939) Kay Thompson (m. 1942; div. 1947) June Havoc (m. 1948)
- Children: 3
- Relatives: Rose Thompson Hovick (mother-in-law); Gypsy Rose Lee (sister-in-law)

William Hannan Spier (October 16, 1906 – May 30, 1973) was an American writer, producer, and director for television and radio. He is best known for his radio work, notably Suspense and The Adventures of Sam Spade.

== Early life ==
William Hannan Spier (pronounced like the word “spear”) was born in New York City to a Jewish father and a Presbyterian mother. Spier graduated from Evander Childs High School.

== Early career ==
At age 19, Spier was hired at Musical America magazine, which was edited by Deems Taylor. He eventually became the chief critic for the magazine.

== Radio ==
In 1929, Spier was hired at the advertising agency Batten, Barton, Durstine and Osborn. At the agency, he produced and directed radio shows, such as The Atwater Kent Hour, an hour-long Sunday night presentation of Metropolitan Opera singers; General Motors' Family Party; and Ethyl Tune-Up Time. In 1936, he directed and co-wrote The March of Time program, hiring Orson Welles for his first job in radio. In 1940, Spier became chief of the writers' department and director of program development at the Columbia Broadcasting Company (“CBS”). At the same time, he was co-director, co-producer and some-time writer of Suspense, an anthology program of mysteries and thrillers, and Duffy's Tavern.

In 1941, Spier relocated to Los Angeles, which gave him access to a larger and better known talent pool. Guest stars for Suspense episodes included Lucille Ball, Cary Grant, Kirk Douglas, Joan Crawford, Bette Davis, Joan Fontaine, Judy Garland, Rita Hayworth, Marlene Dietrich, Richard Widmark and William Holden. Suspense had become increasingly popular; for the 1949–50 season, the program ranked number eight of the top 10 programs. The best known episode of the series was “Sorry Wrong Number,” starring Agnes Moorehead, in which a bed-ridden woman who by a chance incorrect phone connection overhears two men planning to murder a woman at 11:15 p.m. The episode was so popular that it was repeated eight times during the run of the series. The episode was even recorded on two 12-inch discs on Decca Records in 1943, becoming the number three most popular recording. The episode was eventually expanded for a successful film production, starring Barbara Stanwyck and Burt Lancaster.

In 1946, Spier directed, produced and sometimes wrote the radio series The Adventures of Sam Spade, based upon the detective created by Dashiell Hammett. Howard Duff starred as Sam Spade with Lurene Tuttle portraying his loyal secretary Effie. He also produced two anthology series: The Clock (radio) and The James and Pamela Mason Show. A 1949 magazine article said Spier "is generally rated radio's top-notch creator of suspense-type dramas.”

== Television ==
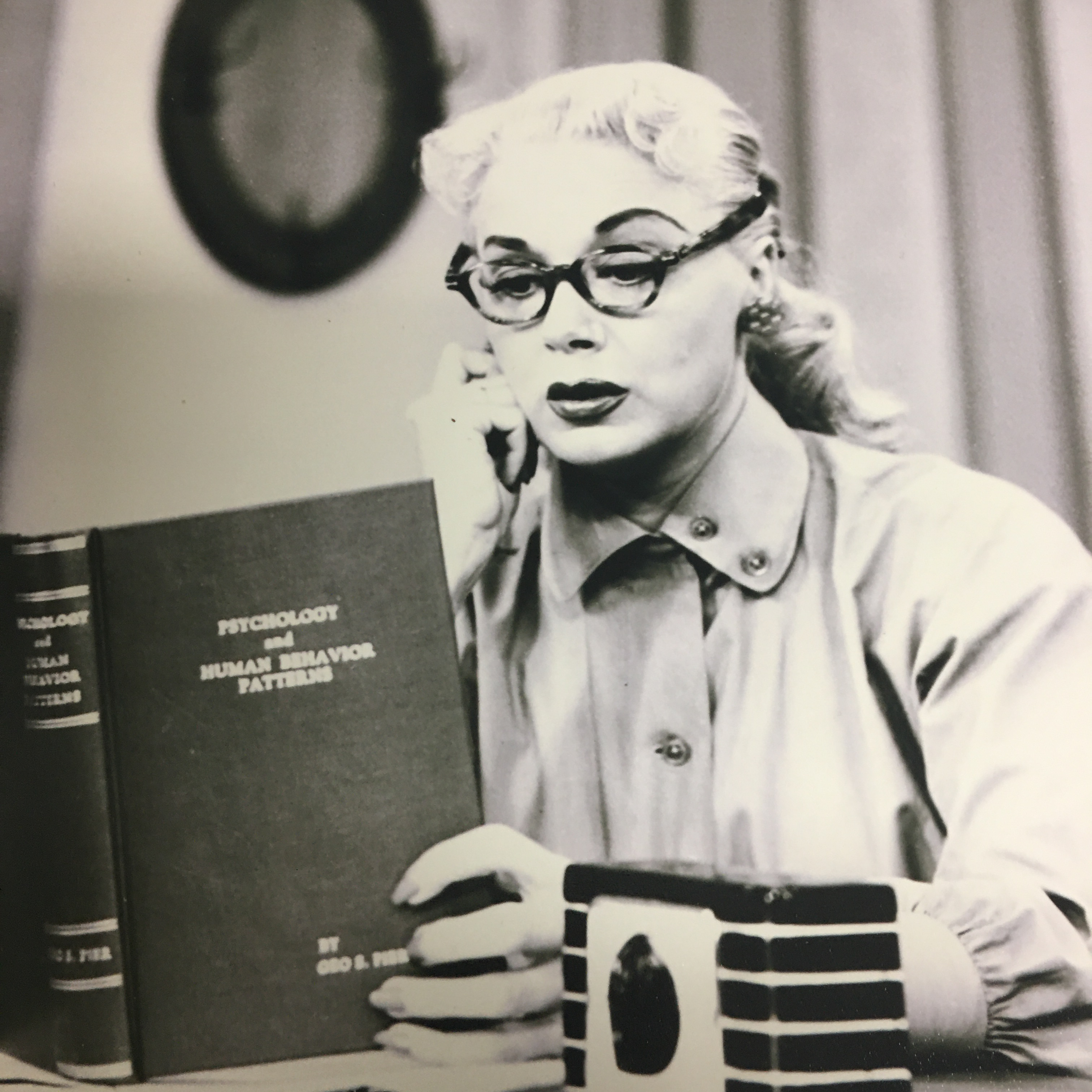
June Havoc in Willy in 1954

In 1952, Spier introduced TV's first 90-minute show, Omnibus, for CBS. He produced Medallion Theatre on NBC in 1953–54. He created (with Louis Pelletier), produced, directed, and wrote for the 1954–1955 CBS situation comedy Willy, starring June Havoc. In some respects, the show was ahead of its time in that Havoc's character, Willa “Willy” Dodger, was an unmarried lawyer with her own legal practice in a small New England town. The show was a Desilu production, and like I Love Lucy, Willy was filmed before a live studio audience. Willy was broadcast at 10:30 p.m. on Saturdays opposite the popular NBC series, Your Hit Parade. Midway through the season, an attempt was made to increase ratings by having Havoc's character relocate to New York to represent show business clients; however, the show only lasted one season. In 1956, Spier produced three episodes of Man Against Crime. He subsequently limited his career in television to writing scripts for such television series as The Lineup, Peter Gunn and The Untouchables.

== Film ==
In 1954, Spier co-directed, with Roy Kellino, the film Lady Possessed, starring James Mason and Havoc, with a screenplay written by Mason and his wife, Pamela Mason, based upon her novel Del Palma. Spier and his ex-wife, actress and singer Kay Thompson, wrote a song for the film, “More Wonderful Than These.” He wrote the original screenplay for the film Tam Lin (1970), directed by Roddy McDowall and starring Ava Gardner. He also wrote the lyrics to the film's theme song, “Sun In My Eyes,” with music by Salena Jones.

== Personal life ==
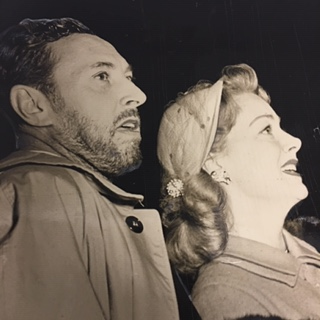
June Havoc and her husband William Spier attending the races in 1951

Spier was married to Mary Scanlan from 1929 to 1939 and had three children with her: Peter, Greta, and Margaret. On July 21, 1941, the CBS program Forecast, produced by Spier, broadcast a pilot comedy “51 East 51,” starring Thompson. In the process of developing this program, Thompson and Spier became reacquainted, having worked together in the past. They were married in 1942. Thompson and Spier became godparents to Liza Minnelli, due to their personal and professional relationships with her parents, Judy Garland and Vincente Minnelli. On June 12, 1947, June Havoc made her first appearance on Suspense, starring in an episode titled “Stand-In.” During the next six months, Havoc starred in four more episodes and appeared uncredited in several more episodes. Thompson and Spier divorced in 1947, and Havoc and he married in 1948. This marriage lasted until his death in 1973.

== Death ==
Spier died, aged 66, at the home he shared with Havoc in Weston, Connecticut.

== Awards ==
Suspense received a Peabody Award – Honorable Mention in 1946.

In 1946, the Mystery Writers of America Award (now Edgar Award) for best radio drama was given to The Adventures of Sam Spade.

Spier received a Writers' Guild of America Award for best episode longer than 30 minutes in length for the two-episode script “The Unhired Assassin” for The Untouchables in 1962.
