= Catch as Catch Can (1937 film) =

1937 British film by Roy Kellino

- Trade show advertisement for the film's 1947 re-issue as Atlantic Episode
- Directed by: Roy Kellino
- Written by: Richard Llewellyn
- Story by: Alexander George
- Produced by: John Findlay
- Starring: James Mason; Viki Dobson; Eddie Pola
- Cinematography: Ronald Neame
- Edited by: Reginald Beck
- Music by: Colin Wark
- Production company: Fox-British Pictures
- Distributed by: Twentieth Century Fox (UK)
- Release date: July 1937 (UK)
- Running time: 71 minutes
- Country: United Kingdom
- Language: English

Catch as Catch Can (also known as Atlantic Episode and Crooked Passage) is a 1937 British crime film directed by Roy Kellino and starring James Mason, Vicky Dobson, Eddie Pola and Margaret Rutherford. It was written by Richard Llewellyn and produced as a quota quickie by Fox-British Pictures. On board a luxury liner, young Barbara Standish attempts to smuggle stolen jewels from France to America.

== Plot ==
On board a liner bound for America, Barbara Standish intends to smuggle some diamonds into America, but her plan is rumbled by U.S. Customs Agent Robert Leyland. Because he has fallen in love with her, he does not arrest her, but instead suggests she goes back to Europe to return the gems. Also on the ship are a number of crooks, intent on stealing the jewels.

== Cast ==
- James Mason as Robert Leyland
- Vicky Dobson as Barbara Standish
- Eddie Pola as Tony Canzari
- Finlay Currie as Al Parsons
- John Warwick as Eddie Fallon
- Margaret Rutherford as Maggie Carberry
- Paul Blake as Cornwallis
- Jimmy Mageean as Ben
- Paul Sheridan as Fournival
- Zoe Wynn as Mrs Kendall

== Reception ==
The Monthly Film Bulletin wrote: "The film has interest but is slow. Viki [sic] Dobson is so colourless as Barbara that we are not sufficiently anxious about her welfare. Eddie Pola and Finlay Currie supply the humour and James Mason makes an attractive hero."

Kine Weekly wrote: "The attempt to establish American character and atmosphere falls by a long chalk, but the technical qualities are otherwise good, and the majority the players make the most of their chances. There is plenty of humour and an occasional thrill to give contrast."

The Daily Film Renter wrote: "Story is well staged but extremely involved, and shoot-up climax savours strongly of slapstick. Pleasant romantic interest, pithy American wisecracks, plus amusing Chicago thug portrayal by Eddie Pola, are main assets. Quota offering for masses."

Picture Show wrote: "Produced on the slick, swift-moving lines of the American gangster melodrama, this British production is quite entertaining. Action takes place on a liner, with a gang of crooks after a girl's diamonds, and a detective after the crooks. Efficiently acted, well set."
