= Willy (TV series) =

American television series

- June Havoc in the opening credits for Willy.
- Genre: Sitcom
- Created by: Louis Pelletier; William Spier
- Written by: Bob Fisher; Alan Lipscott; Ellis Marcus; Louis Pelletier; William Spier; Harold Swanton
- Starring: June Havoc; Mary Treen; Whitfield Connor
- Composer: Elliot Daniel
- Country of origin: United States
- Original language: English
- No. of seasons: 1
- No. of episodes: 39

Production
- Executive producer: Desi Arnaz
- Producers: William Spier; George Cahan
- Camera setup: Multi-camera
- Running time: 22 mins.
- Production company: Desilu Productions

Original release
- Network: CBS
- Release: September 18, 1954 – June 16, 1955

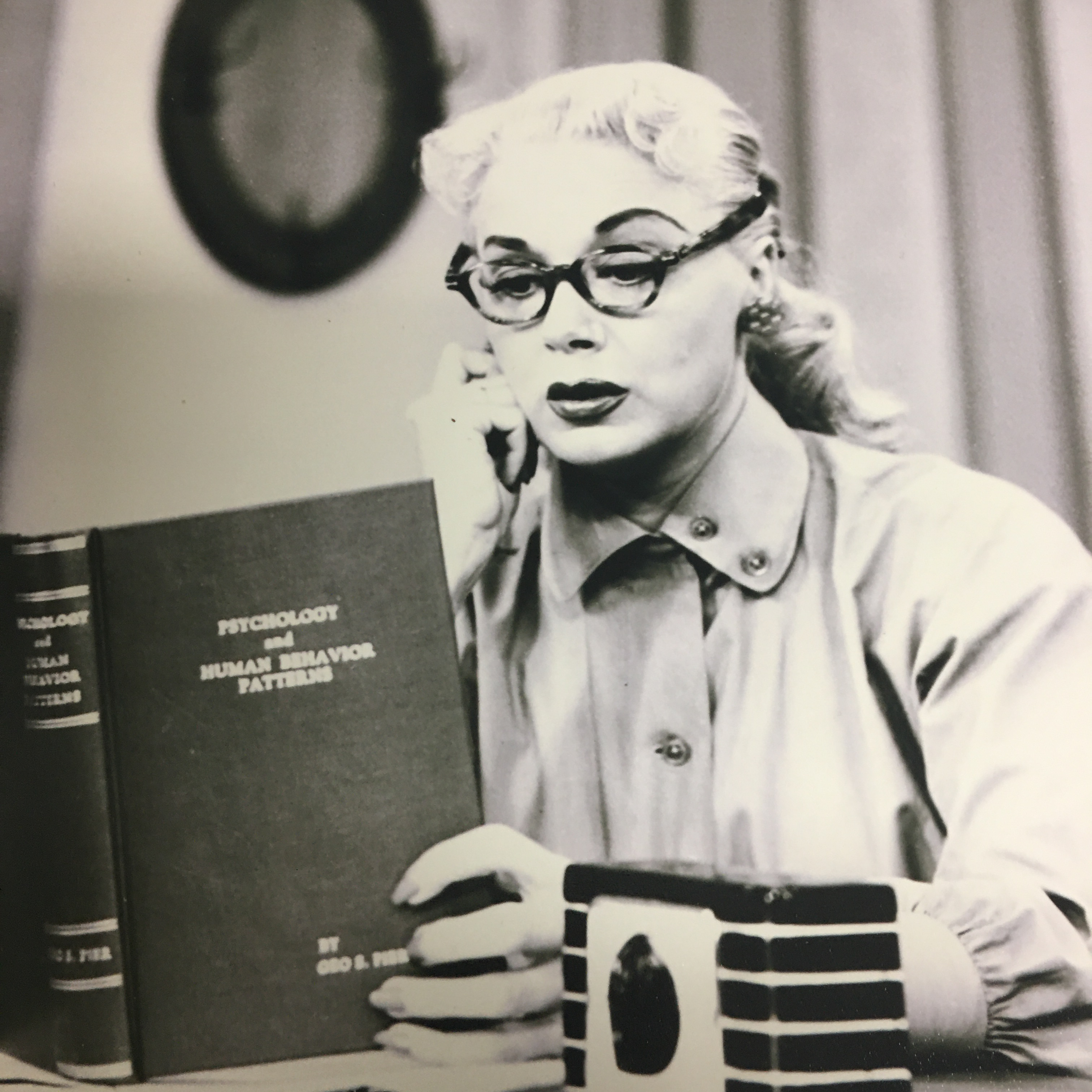
June Havoc in Willy in 1954

Willy is an American sitcom about a small-town female lawyer who later moves to New York City. It aired on CBS from September 1954 to June 1955. The series stars June Havoc and was produced by Desilu Productions.

== Synopsis ==
A vaudeville star as a child, Willa "Willy" Dodger is inspired by her father, who had been a circuit court judge, to become a lawyer. After four years of night school, she graduates from law school, passes the bar, and opens a law practice in her home town of Renfrew in rural New Hampshire. After six months in business, she finally gets her first case. Her family in Renfrew includes her father, William Makepeace "Papa" Dodger, her widowed sister Emily Dodger, and her nephew Franklin Sanders. Her boyfriend is Charlie Bush, the town veterinarian.

In March 1955, the lack of legal business in Renfrew prompts Willy to relocate to New York City to represent a vaudeville troupe, the Bannister Vaudeville Company. Charlie does not follow her, but her family reluctantly makes the move with her. In her far more cosmopolitan life in New York, her boss — who thought he had hired a male lawyer — is Perry Bannister. She also reunites with her old friend Harvey Evelyn, who is the manager of a repertory company.

Whether in Renfrew or New York, Willy′s law practice usually handles cases that are on the lighter side of the law.

== Cast ==
- Willa "Willy" Dodger...June Havoc
- William Makepeace "Papa" Dodger...Lloyd Corrigan
- Emily Dodger...Mary Treen
- Franklin Sanders...Danny Richards, Jr.
- Charlie Bush...Whitfield Connor
- Perry Bannister...Hal Peary (1955)
- Harvey Evelyn...Sterling Holloway (1955)

Some confusion exists as to who portrayed Papa Dodger.Wheaton Chambers, misspelled as "Weaton Chambers," is credited in the premiere episode, but Lloyd Corrigan generally is credited with the role. It is possible that Chambers originated the role and Corrigan subsequently replaced him.

== Production ==
Willy was filmed at Desilu Studios. William Spier, Havoc's third and last husband, was the producer for the series. Although female lawyers already had been the lead characters on daytime television shows, Willy was the first prime-time American television show to feature a female lawyer as its lead character.

Willy′s original working title was Miss Bachelor at Law, but by the time its pilot was filmed before a live audience at Motion Picture Center (later known as Desilu Studios) on April 29, 1954, it had been renamed My Aunt Willy, and by the beginning of August 1954 it was called The Artful Miss Dodger. It finally became Willy before it premiered in September 1954.

Willy had low ratings during its first few months, and in January 1955, press reports indicated that Willy′s sponsor, General Mills, wanted to replace the show. In a February 1955 interview, June Havoc said the show was having trouble convincing television viewers of the mid-1950s that there was such a thing as a female lawyer and that female lawyers did not "all look like Victorian spinsters."

In an attempt to boost Willy′s ratings, the Willy Dodger character moved from rural New Hampshire to New York City in March 1955, the show′s producers hoping that the new premise would give June Havoc a better opportunity to display her comedic and dancing talents. Havoc visited the American Guild of Variety Artists (AGVA) to prepare for her portrayal of her character as working for the AGVA, although in the show the Willy character apparently worked for the Bannister Vaudeville Company rather than the AGVA.

In April 1955, Willy moved from Saturday to Thursday nights. Neither the change of premise or the change of schedule saved the show, and by early May 1955 General Mills had dropped its sponsorship of the series. Willy completed production in May 1955 after 39 episodes, and June Havoc checked into a hospital for five days of rest and relaxation after production wrapped.

== Reception ==
When Willy debuted in September 1954, critic Larry Wolters of the Chicago Daily Tribune described the Willy Dodger character as “a young Portia,” a reference to the heroine of William Shakespeare’s The Merchant of Venice. Associated Press radio and television editor C. E. Butterfield wrote that the premiere episode suggested that “the story sounds as if it might develop, although it may take a little time to build up an audience.” Willy never found that audience. It was rated the lowest of all new CBS shows and one of the lowest of new programs on any network in December 1954, and the third-lowest of new CBS shows and one of the lowest of new situation comedies on any network in January 1955.

In 1957, June Havoc said that she believed Willy had failed because it had been designed as a show for a family to sit together and watch, something that she thought no family would do during Willy′s time slot at 10:30 p.m. on Saturday.

== Broadcast history ==
Premiering on September 18, 1954, Willy began its run airing on Saturdays at 10:30 p.m. Eastern Time through March 1955. It followed That's My Boy, another situation comedy on the CBS Saturday lineup, and aired opposite Your Hit Parade on NBC. In April 1955, Willy moved to Thursdays at 10:30 p.m. Eastern Time, where it remained for the rest of its run. It was cancelled after a single season, and its last original episode was broadcast on June 16, 1955.

After the show′s last new episode, CBS broadcast reruns of Willy for three more weeks in its Thursday time slot, the last of them airing on July 7, 1955. Willy then ran in syndication for the rest of the 1950s before disappearing from the air.

== Episodes ==
No.	Title	Directed by	Written by	Original release date
1	"First Case"	William Spier	William Spier and Louis Pelletier	September 18, 1954
Six months after opening her law practice in Renfrew, New Hampshire, Willy has not had a single case — until Franklin's little friend asks Willy to save his dog from being euthanized by Homer, the local dogcatcher, for scaring a farmer's cow so badly that the cow no longer gives milk. Willy wins the case, getting her legal career off to a positive start — and making enough money to keep her law books from being repossessed. Guest stars include a young Aaron Spelling as Homer and Charles Lane as Willy′s boss.
2	"Get Charlie's Goat"	Unknown	Unknown	September 25, 1954
Willy takes a case in which her boyfriend Charlie is the defendant.
3	"Operation Stocks"	Unknown	Unknown	October 2, 1954
Willy is appointed secretary of Harvey Evelyn's stock operation. Guest star: Will Wright.
4	"New York Colleague"	Unknown	Unknown	October 9, 1954
A lawyer from New York City arrives in Renfrew and tells Willy that he wants her to be his legal associate on a big case — but he actually is more interested in a romantic relationship with Willy. Guest star: Hal March.
5	"Willy Decides Not to Run"	Unknown	Unknown	October 16, 1954
Willy learns that she has received the dubious honor of being nominated to run for town assessor of Renfrew. When she discovers that it is too late to decline the nomination, she decides to ruin her chances of being elected by running on an "honesty" platform.
6	"Willy's Commission"	Unknown	Unknown	October 23, 1954
Willy will earn a $2,000 commission if she sells the local movie theater. Remembering her days as a child star, she tries to talk her former agent into buying it.
7	"Willy and the Crook Julius"	Unknown	Unknown	October 30, 1954
When Willy takes the case of a mild-mannered man who steals a fishing rod on impulse, she seeks to prove that someone can do something illegal without criminal intent.
8	"Willy Waves the Flag"	Unknown	Unknown	November 6, 1954
Willy leads a campaign to remove obsolete laws from Renfrew′s statute books — including one that says the driver of a self-propelled vehicle must be preceded by a person carrying a red warning flag.
9	"Water Witch Case"	Unknown	Unknown	November 13, 1954
Willy defends a man who claims to be a "water witch" who can guess the sites of underground water and is going to court after his latest customer digs 300 feet (91 m) based on his predictions and finds only dirt.
10	"Job Offer"	Unknown	Unknown	November 20, 1954
Willy is torn between her career and her family when she receives an offer to work for a law firm in Los Angeles, California, at a salary of $10,000 a year but her family insists that she remain in Renfrew.
11	"The French Hat"	Unknown	Unknown	November 27, 1954
Willy defends herself in court when the socialite Eleanor Van Doren claims she suffered a knee injury while fighting with Willy over a French hat in a shop.
12	"Willy and Muller v. Muller"	Unknown	Unknown	December 4, 1954
The local butcher and his wife end what had been a long, happy marriage on a note of disagreement, and Willy must file for their divorce.
13	"The Substitution"	Unknown	Unknown	December 11, 1954
Willy's boyfriend Charlie returns from his vacation to find that his friend has substituted for him in his veterinary practice — and also won Willy′s heart.
14	"Papa's Birthday"	Unknown	Unknown	December 18, 1954
The Dodgers may lose their house on Papa Dodger's birthday when the building inspector discovers that it was built without a permit.
15	"The Fate of the Theatre"	Unknown	Unknown	December 25, 1954
Willy's chances for theatrical fame appear slim after an old foe threatens to buy the theater for use as a barn.
16	"The Charity Benefit"	Unknown	Unknown	January 1, 1955
Willy stages a benefit show to provide a home for an old friend of hers — a pet seal.
17	"Willy and L'Affaire Paul Revere"	Unknown	Unknown	January 8, 1955
Willy and the local art league get a famed French painter to do a portrait of Paul Revere for the town hall by agreeing that Willy will be his regular evening date during the assignment.
18	"Willy and Aunt Cora's Beau"	Unknown	Unknown	January 15, 1955
Aunt Cora is surprised when her current boyfriend is the guest-of-honor on a true-crime television program, and Willy takes up his defense.
19	"Willy and Grandpa's Piano"	Unknown	Unknown	January 22, 1955
Papa Dodger plans to make a great personal sacrifice when he learns Willy's law books may be repossessed.
20	"Puppy Love"	Unknown	Unknown	January 29, 1955
Willy's dog Joseph runs away with the circus, following a female dog he likes.
21	"Willy and the Mystery Package"	Unknown	Unknown	February 5, 1955
While Willy prepares for the case of a package left in an antique shop that both the saleslady and the owner of the store claim, speculation mounts about the package's contents.
22	"The Daniel Boone Case"	Unknown	Unknown	February 12, 1955
After Willy successfully defends a basketball hero on the charge that he painted a city park statue of Daniel Boone in the local high school colors, he becomes homesick. Guest stars: Harry Harvey, Jr., Ralph Peters, Norma Jean Nillson, and Helen Morningstar.
23	"Willy's Nephew"	Unknown	Unknown	February 19, 1955
Willy must defend her nephew Franklin, who has been charged with embezzling from his class treasury at school — but circumstantial evidence convinces her that he is guilty.
24	"Willy Doubles in Brass"	Unknown	Unknown	February 26, 1955
Willy tries to save the town band from abolition by crusty town councilman Andy Reynolds.
25	"Willy and the Farewell Dance"	Unknown	Unknown	March 5, 1955
Willy has decided to relocate to New York City because of the lack of legal business in Renfrew, and the town is giving a going-away party for her — but her excitement dims when she hears over the radio that her boyfriend Charlie has another date for the affair.
26	"New York Bound"	Unknown	Unknown	March 12, 1955
Leaving Charlie behind in Renfrew, Willy and her family move to New York City so she can begin her new job as counsel for the Bannister Vaudeville Company. She wonders how close she will come to the performing arts in her new life — and she gets off on the wrong foot with her new boss, Percy Bannister, who thought he had hired a male lawyer.
27	"Willy and the Kate Fleming Case"	Unknown	Unknown	March 19, 1955
When an aging actress who is an old vaudeville friend of Willy′s is alleged to have stolen a dance and becomes involved in a legal dispute over it, Willy steps in to help her.
28	"Willy and Hansel and Gretel"	Unknown	Unknown	March 26, 1955
Willy hires what she thinks is a young Irish boy to play Hansel in a benefit production of Hansel and Gretel, then discovers that the actor she hired is 30 years old. Guest star: Michael Emmet.
29	"Willy's New York Neighbors"	Unknown	Unknown	April 7, 1955
Trying to adjust to her new life in New York City, Willy meets her new neighbors — and especially tries to meet a famous opera star. Guest star: Fortunio Bonanova.
30	"Papa's Hot Tip"	Unknown	Unknown	April 14, 1955
Papa Dodger overhears a stockbroker in Willy's office building discussing a hot tip and decides to invest all his savings in the stock market. Guest stars: William Tracy, Herbert Heyes, Helen Morningstar, and Frank Jenks.
31	"Willy and the Counterfeiters"	Unknown	Unknown	April 21, 1955
Willy tries to help her janitor's family by sending a package to the United Kingdom and ends up getting involved with a pair of counterfeiters. Guest stars: Paul E. Burns and Madge Blake.
32	"Willy's New Dress"	Unknown	Unknown	April 28, 1955
Willy's sister Emily makes her a new dress, not realizing the material bears the label of the women's state prison — and when Willy wears it to a society party, she becomes the center of attention. Guest stars: Norma Varden and Alice Wellman.
33	"Willy Saves Harvey From Fraud"	Unknown	Unknown	May 5, 1955
Bonds for the library in Renfrew mistakenly are given to Harvey Evelyn, and he promptly invests the money in a New York City skyscraper. Willy must find a way to correct the mistake and save Harvey from going to jail for fraud. Guest star: Joe Besser
34	"The Big Fight"	Unknown	Unknown	May 12, 1955
Willy's nephew, Franklin, gets in a fist fight with the school bully, and Willy fears that she may lose her job when she learns that the bully is a nephew of Willy's boss, Perry Banister. Guest stars: Paul Rasch, Carole Ann Campbell, and Karen Greene.
35	"Willy's Painting"	Unknown	Unknown	May 19, 1955
Willy tries to prove a collection of modern art is overvalued by creating a painting of her own, then is amazed when her picture gets a fantastic bid at an auction — and horrified when she discovers her boss is the bidder. Guest stars: Howard McNear and Tom Brown.
36	"Franklin's Shoe Business"	Unknown	Unknown	May 26, 1955
Willy's nephew Franklin opens a shoeshine stand and collects shoes from tenants in Willy's building — but when Willy finds the shoes in her living room, she assumes they have been donated for a worthy cause and sends them to her favorite charity. Guest stars: Peter Leeds, Joseph Kearns, Paul Cavanagh, Gus Schilling, and Paul Maxey.
37	"Willy and El Flamenco"	Unknown	Unknown	June 2, 1955
Willy tries to solve the marital problems of a Spanish flamenco dancer and his wife. Guest stars: Luis Arbana, Phyllis Coates, Rosa Turich, Gonzales Gonzales, and Carole Ann Campbell.
38	"Willy and Eccentric Henrietta"	Unknown	Unknown	June 9, 1955
When a woman's brother tries to prove she is not capable of handling her estate and that it should be turned over to him, Willy tries to prove the woman's competence.
39	"Willy and Hurricane Harvey"	Unknown	Unknown	June 16, 1955
Harvey Evelyn appoints Willy secretary of his stock operations, believing it to be the quickest way to market his weather-making machine.
