= Medallion Theatre =

- Also known as: Chrysler Medallion Theatre
- Genre: Anthology series
- No. of episodes: 30

Production
- Producer: William Spier
- Running time: 30 minutes

Original release
- Network: CBS
- Release: July 11, 1953 – April 3, 1954

Medallion Theatre, aka Chrysler Medallion Theatre, is a 30-minute American anthology series that aired on CBS from July 11, 1953, to April 3, 1954. Henry Fonda (in the premiere telecast "The Decision of Arrowsmith"), Claude Rains, and Janet Gaynor made their major television dramatic debuts on this series in various 1953 episodes. Others guest stars included Helen Hayes, Charlton Heston, Ronald Reagan, Jack Lemmon, Rod Steiger, and Roddy McDowell. Among its writers were Rod Serling and Robert Anderson. Directors included Ralph Nelson, Don Medford, Robert Stevens, and Seymour Robbie. The original producer was William Spier.

== Premise ==
Spier said that older short stories were selected for their quality: "Thirty or forty years ago, writers knew content better, and by using their stories we hope to get what we're aiming at, dramas with fiber and dimension."

== Production ==
All thirty episodes were aired live from New York. Mort Abrahams was associate producer, Samuel Leve was the set designer, and Robert Tallman the story editor.

== Reaction ==
Ben Gross of the New York Daily News said it was "a welcome recruit to the ranks of live dramatic shows". Columnist John Crosby was intrigued at the show's extracting a storyline for its premiere episode from a longer work, and praised the cast, writing, and all-around production.

== Broadcast history ==
By mid-February 1954 columnist Erskine Johnson reported that CBS had decided to replace Medallion Theater with a new sitcom called That's My Boy. About the same time, the producer role was taken over by Mort Abrahams.

== Episodes ==
List of Episodes of Medallion Theatre (in original broadcast order)
Date	Title	Cast	Notes
Jul 11, 1953	The Decision of Arrowsmith	Henry Fonda, Diana Douglas, Juano Hernández	An extract from the novel by Sinclair Lewis.
Jul 18, 1953	A Job for Jimmy Valentine	Ronald Reagan	Adaption from O. Henry short story.
Jul 25, 1953	Grand Cross of the Crescent	Jack Lemmon, Ernest Truex, Freddie Bartholomew	
Aug 01, 1953	The Man Who Liked Dickens	Claude Rains, Richard Kiley, Russell Collins	The Evelyn Waugh short story is given a happy ending.
Aug 08, 1953	Mrs. Union Station	June Havoc, Scott McKay, Richard Carlyle	Newlywed has to compete with husband's electric train hobby.
Aug 15, 1953	The Consul	Charles Ruggles	A diplomat deals with a visiting politician, adapted from Richard Harding Davis story.
Aug 22, 1953	The Quiet Village	Robert Preston	Film director (Preston) plots revenge on actor.
Aug 29, 1953	Columbo Discovers Italy	Dane Clark	Brooklyn shoemaker inherits decaying island hotel.
Sep 05, 1953	Scent of the Roses	Martha Scott, Patricia Smith	Southern woman bides her time in pursuing a husband.
Sep 12, 1953	The Padre of San Pablo	Zachary Scott	Mexican bank-robber assumes identity of deceased priest.
Sep 19, 1953	The Bartlett Desk	Edward Everett Horton, Mildred Natwick	Antique dealer badgers poor woman for her family heirloom.
Sep 26, 1953	The Big Bow Mystery	Cedric Hardwicke	Retired Scotland Yard detective solves crime.
Oct 03, 1953	The Archer Case	Claude Rains	Barrister defends cadet accused of stealing five shillings.
Oct 10, 1953	Trouble Train	Jeffrey Lynn, Madge Evans, Iris Mann	Son of separated couple tries to reunite them.
Oct 17, 1953	A Time for Heroes	Victor Moore	Moore plays aged Civil War veteran.
Oct 24, 1953	Return Match	Maria Riva, Joseph Anthony, William Prince	Tennis player ex- roils woman's second marriage.
Oct 31, 1953	Gran'ma Rebel	Jackie Cooper, Betsy von Furstenberg, Beulah Bondi	
Nov 07, 1953	Battle Hymn	Helen Hayes, Wesley Addy, Stephen Cortleigh	Harriet Beecher Stowe ponders her novel's contribution to starting the Civil War.
Nov 14, 1953	The Bishop's Candlesticks	Victor Jory and Barry Jones	An episode from the first volume of Les Misérables.
Nov 21, 1953	The Canterville Ghost	Edward Everett Horton	
Nov 28, 1953	Dear Cynthia	Janet Gaynor	
Dec 05, 1953	Crimson Velvet	Blanche Yurka	Aging star attempts to revive her career.
Dec 12, 1953	A Day in Town	Charlton Heston	Poverty-stricken farmer must sell his land to feed his family.
Dec 19, 1953	Twenty-four Men to a Plane	Jackie Cooper and Leslie Nielsen	Two former flying officers clash over a General's diary.
Dec 26, 1953	They Called Them the Meek	Thomas Gomez and Gene Raymond	This was a drama by Rod Serling.
Jan 02, 1954	A Suitable Marriage	Otto Kruger, Roddy McDowell, Ann Shoemaker, Lenka Peterson, Morton Stevens, and Francis Compton.	
Jan 09, 1954	The Magic Touch	Paul Douglas	Ghost writer's integrity is challenged by his son.
Jan 16, 1954	The Gentle Deception	Thomas Mitchell	A plumber with style is taken for a doctor.
Jan 23, 1954	The Blue Serge Suit	Diana Lynn	Newlywed comes to terms with the ethics of the legal profession.
Jan 30, 1954	Book Overdue	Jan Sterling and Barry Sullivan	Mystery writer's attempt to write novel imperils his marriage.
Feb 06, 1954	Teacher	Nancy Olson, Don Taylor, Hope Emerson	Schoolmarm (Olson) is caught up in rural infighting.
Feb 13, 1954	The 39th Bomb	Steve Cochran	Former military bomb disposal expert must deal with time-bomb.
Feb 20, 1954	The Voyage Back	Richard Kiley, Nancy Kelly, Claudia Morgan	Couple encounters lonely third party on sea voyage. Original teleplay by Tad Mosel.
Feb 27, 1954	Homestead	Eddie Albert	Land agents try to cheat settlers in Oklahoma Territory.
Mar 6, 1954	Sinners	Mildred Dunnock, Rhys Williams	Woman confronts man she had sent to prison wrongfully.
Mar 13, 1954	Flight to Fame	Edith Fellows	Young actress must decide between her opportunity for Broadway and a stranger's life.
Mar 20, 1954	Contact with the West	Jerome Thor, Joseph Wiseman	British officer befriends liberated Russian POW during World War II. Original teleplay by Geoffrey Kean.
Mar 27, 1954	The Alibi Kid	Sam Levene, Stephen McNally, Ben Gazzarra	Heavyweight contender has trouble with brother's impending marriage.
Apr 03, 1954	Safari	Brian Donlevy, Marilyn Erskine	Hunter is obsessed with capturing rare African animal.
