= Troubled Waters (1936 film) =

- W.T. Ellwanger, Virginia Cherrill and James Mason in the film
- Directed by: Albert Parker
- Written by: Gerard Fairlie
- Story by: W. P. Lipscomb; Reginald Pound
- Produced by: John Findlay
- Starring: Alastair Sim; Virginia Cherrill; James Mason
- Cinematography: Roy Kellino
- Edited by: Cecil H. Williamson
- Production company: Fox-British Pictures
- Distributed by: Twentieth Century-Fox Film Company (UK)
- Release dates: 4 February 1936 (London, England)
- Running time: 70 minutes
- Country: United Kingdom
- Language: English

Troubled Waters is a 1936 British mystery film directed by Albert Parker and starring James Mason, Virginia Cherrill, Alastair Sim, Raymond Lovell and Sam Wilkinson. It was written by Gerald Fairlie from a story by W. P. Lipscomb and Reginald Pound. The film was made at Wembley Studios as a quota quickie by the British subsidiary of Fox Film.

== Plot ==
A quiet country village community has invested in a failing mineral spring water business. After a local man dies in a car accident, the coroner's jury concocts a scheme to return a verdict of murder, hoping the ensuing scandal will bring much-needed publicity to the town and its spring. However, the plan takes an unexpected twist when John Merriman, a government agent investigating a ring of explosive smugglers, arrives on the scene. He discovers that the "staged" murder is actually the real thing, unravels the mystery and exposes the smugglers.

== Cast ==
- Alastair Sim as Mac MacTavish
- Virginia Cherrill as June Elkhardt
- James Mason as John Merriman
- Raymond Lovell as Carter
- Bellenden Powell as Dr Garthwaite
- Sam Wilkinson as Lightning
- Peter Popp as Timothy Golightly
- W.T. Ellwanger as Ezra Elkhardt

== Critical reception ==
Kine Weekly wrote: "Crime detection and humour are adequately blended in a mystery staged against the background of a remote English village. The plot is rather far-fetched, and the love interest based on the customary quarrel between the pratagonists, apt to be forced."

The Daily Film Renter wrote: "Far-fetched melodrama ... Direction never gets at grips with fantastic subject matter, and action is occasionally difficult to follow. Best performance comes from Alastair Sim as unctuous publican, with James Mason a likeable lead as Government agent. Moderate entertainment for the masses."

Picture Show wrote: "Fair entertainment."

TV Guide gave the film two out of four stars, writing: "The action is sustained throughout and Mason, as usual, is very good."
