= Cay Forrester =

American actress (1898–1989)

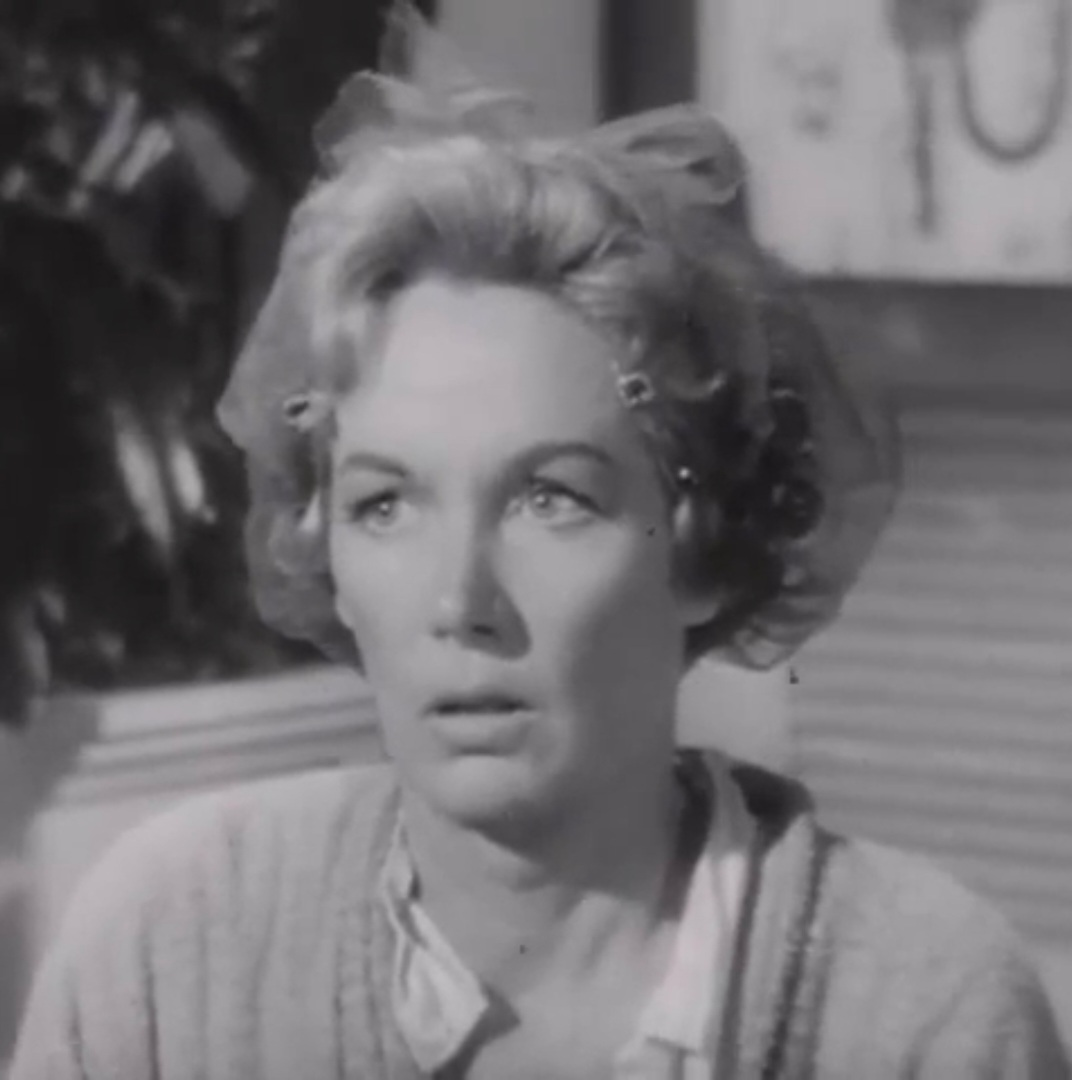
- Forrester in Five Minutes to Live (1961)
- Born: Mila Patricia Crosby; December 26, 1921; Stockton, California, U.S.
- Died: June 18, 2005 (aged 83); Las Vegas, Nevada, U.S.
- Other names: Kay Forrester
- Occupation: Actress
- Years active: 1943–1976

Cay Forrester (born Mila Patricia Crosby; December 26, 1921 – June 18, 2005) was an American film and television actress. She appeared predominantly in minor films with some exceptions, such as Advise and Consent and the Susan Hayward hit Smash-Up, the Story of a Woman.

== Biography ==
Forrester made her debut as "Kay Forrester" in a 1943 Western called Blazing Guns. Her biggest role was in the 1950 cult classic DOA, where Forrester played a married woman who tempts Edmond O'Brien. Shortly after this film, she married producer Ludlow Flower, Jr., and retired from the big screen.

Forrester went on to write and co-star in the 1961 thriller Five Minutes to Live produced by her husband; it was notable for the rare big-screen appearance of Johnny Cash. The film was re-released in 1966 under the title Door-to-Door Maniac.

Forrester was guest-starring on television shows up to the early 1970s. Her final films were two major disaster films with Charlton Heston, Two-Minute Warning and Airport 1975.

Forrester died of pneumonia in Las Vegas, Nevada, in 2005.

== Filmography ==
Year	Title	Role	Notes
1943	Blazing Guns	Mary Baxter	
1944	San Fernando Valley	Cowgirl	Uncredited
1944	Song of the Range	Dale Harding	
1945	Brenda Starr, Reporter	Vera Harvey	Serial, [Ch 2-4], Uncredited
1945	Dakota	Entertainer	Uncredited
1946	Strange Impersonation	Miss Roper	
1946	Suspense	Party Girl	Uncredited
1946	Don't Gamble with Strangers	Mrs. Horton	Uncredited
1946	Deadline for Murder	Bit Role	Uncredited
1946	Below the Deadline	Blonde	
1946	That Brennan Girl	Jailbird	Uncredited
1947	Queen of the Amazons	Sugi	
1947	Smash-Up, the Story of a Woman	Young Woman	Uncredited
1947	Violence	Sally Donahue	
1947	The Pretender	Evelyn Cossett	
1947	Blonde Savage	Mary Comstock	
1948	The Challenge	Roberts' Receptionist	Uncredited
1948	Canon City	Mrs. Wilson - Sherbondy's Sister	
1948	Hollow Triumph	Nurse	Uncredited
1949	Hold That Baby!	Sanitarium Nurse	Uncredited
1949	D.O.A.	Sue	
1950	Love That Brute	Moll	Uncredited
1950	To Please a Lady	Minor Role	Uncredited
1961	Five Minutes to Live	Nancy Wilson	
1962	Advise & Consent	President's Secretary	Uncredited
1966	Made in Paris	Mrs. Leland	Uncredited
1972	Fuzz	Mrs. Scanlon	
1973	Showdown	Saleslady	Uncredited
1975	Airport 1975	Mary Chilcutt - Passenger	Uncredited
1976	Two-Minute Warning	Mrs. Ogden	(final film role)
