= I Met a Murderer =

1939 film by Roy Kellino

- Directed by: Roy Kellino
- Written by: Pamela Kellino; James Mason; Roy Kellino
- Produced by: Roy Kellino
- Starring: James Mason; Pamela Mason; Sylvia Coleridge
- Cinematography: Oswald Morris; Roy Kellino
- Edited by: Fergus McDonell
- Music by: Eric Ansell
- Production company: Gamma Films
- Distributed by: Grand National Pictures
- Release dates: 4 March 1939 (UK); 1 October 1939 (US)
- Running time: 79 minutes
- Country: United Kingdom
- Language: English

I Met a Murderer is a 1939 British thriller film directed by Roy Kellino and starring James Mason, Pamela Kellino, Sylvia Coleridge and William Devlin. It was written by Pamela Mason, James Mason and Kellino.

== Plot ==
A man murders his oppressive wife and flees from the police. He meets a young woman who suspects his identity as the murderer, but conceals this because she wants to use the story for a book.

== Cast ==
- James Mason as Mark Warrow
- Pamela Kellino as Jo Trent
- Sylvia Coleridge as Martha Warrow
- William Devlin as Jay
- Peter Coke as horseman
- Esma Cannon as blond camper
- Sheila Morgan as brunette camper
- James Harcourt as hay wagon driver
- Sheppy as the dog

== Production ==
The film was shot on the Isle of Wight in 1939.

== Critical reception ==
The Monthly Film Bulletin wrote: "The photography is good and the idea is original. No studio sets are used and the action all takes place in the open countryside."

Kine Weekly wrote: "The sincere attempt to embrace within one plot the full gamut of human emotions is not entirely successful, but near enough for the effort to impress others than the unsophisticated. James Mason and Pamela Kellino handle the story, which, incidentally, is of their joint authorship, with genuine feeling, while director Roy Kellino follows up their earnest team-work with no little camera skill. Picturesque landscapes accentuate the tale's inherent tragedy. Out-of-the-rut booking for better-class halls."

TV Guide gave the film two out of four stars, noting, "Several novel twists in the tale of a fugitive on the run make this one fascinating."
