= Pamela Mason =

English actress and author (1916–1996)

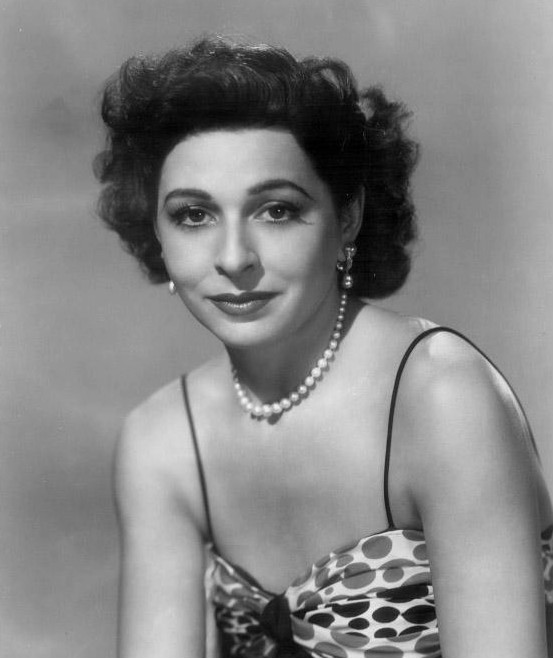
- Mason in 1952
- Born: Pamela Helen Ostrer; 10 March 1916; Rochford, Essex, England
- Died: 29 June 1996 (aged 80); Beverly Hills, California, US
- Other name: Pamela Kellino
- Occupations: Actress, screenwriter
- Years active: 1934–1985
- Spouses: Roy Kellino (m. 1932; div. 1940) James Mason (m. 1941; div. 1964)
- Children: Portland Mason; Morgan Mason
- Father: Isidore Ostrer
- Relatives: Belinda Carlisle (daughter-in-law)

Pamela Helen Mason (née Ostrer; 10 March 1916 – 29 June 1996), also known during her career as Pamela Kellino, was an English actress, author and screenwriter. She was the creative partner and first wife of the actor James Mason.

== Early life and personal life ==
Born Pamela Helen Ostrer in either Westgate-on-Sea, Kent, or Southend-on-Sea, Essex, Mason was the daughter of Helen (née Spear-Morgan) and Isidore Ostrer, a wealthy Jewish industrialist and banker who became president of the Gaumont British Picture Corporation in the early 1920s. Pamela left school at age 9, and married cinematographer Roy Kellino at age 18 in 1934, thereafter taking the name "Pamela Kellino".

In 1935, Pamela Kellino met actor James Mason on the set of his second film, Troubled Waters, on which her husband was working as a cinematographer. James Mason and Kellino were quickly attracted to each other. Mason became close friends with both Kellinos, moved in with them, and collaborated with them on several stage and screen projects, culminating in the 1938 film I Met a Murderer, in which he and Kellino played lovers on the run. Shortly afterwards, Roy Kellino divorced Pamela, naming James Mason as co-respondent, and she married Mason in 1940. Roy Kellino remained on friendly terms with the Masons and directed their later films Lady Possessed and Charade. After her divorce and remarriage, Pamela Mason continued to use the name "Pamela Kellino" for some years in her acting and writing work.

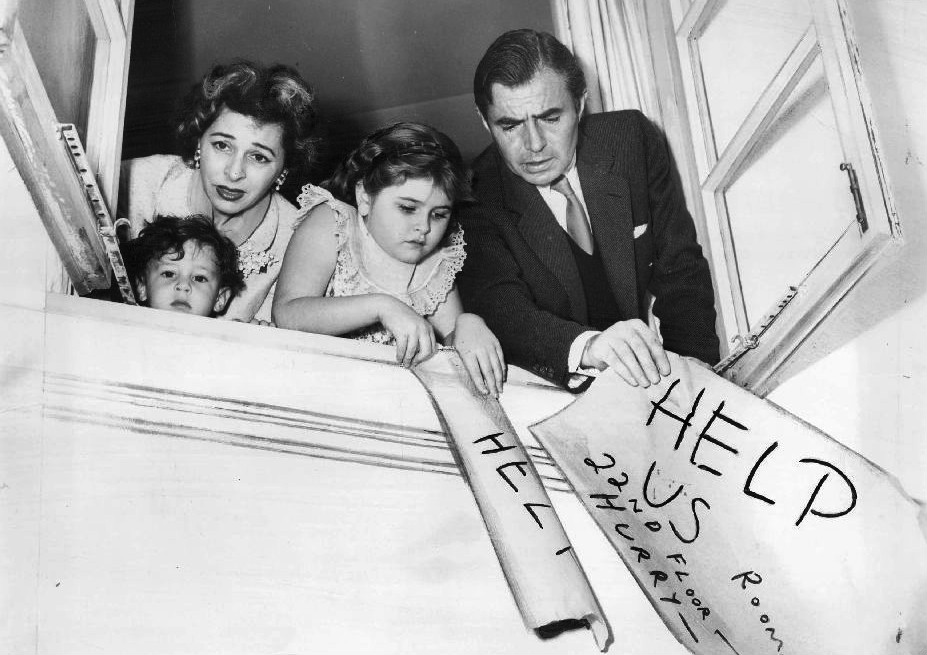
The Mason family in 1957 in the television programme Panic!. From left, son Morgan, Pamela Mason, daughter Portland and husband James Mason.

The Masons moved from London to Hollywood in the late 1940s, occupying the mansion previously owned by Buster Keaton, where Pamela became a popular hostess of parties. They had two children: daughter Portland (1948–2004), and son Morgan (who later became an advisor to President Ronald Reagan and married Belinda Carlisle). Portland was named for the Masons' friend Portland Hoffa, the wife of the American radio comedian Fred Allen.

Pamela Mason filed suit for divorce from James in 1962, claiming that he had committed adultery. According to their son Morgan and other sources, Pamela herself had had numerous affairs, but due to her attorney Marvin Mitchelson's skill, she won a monetary settlement of at least $1 million ($9.275 million today) when the marriage was finally dissolved in 1964; it was reported as "America's first million-dollar divorce". As a result of this success, Mitchelson became a sought-after celebrity divorce attorney. Pamela Mason continued to live in the Keaton mansion in Beverly Hills until her death, sharing it "with a multitude of free-range cats." She remained someone who was listened to and outspoken "with unrepentant, undeviating, withering aim."

== Film ==
Mason (as Pamela Kellino) made her film debut in 1934 in the Gaumont British big-budget film Jew Süss. She remained under contract to Gaumont British (her father's film company) for several years, despite acting in films only sporadically while also working as a screenwriter, producer, and author.

From the late 1930s through the 1950s, Pamela Mason (often credited as Pamela Kellino, including after her marriage to James Mason), wrote, produced and/or appeared in several films in collaboration with James Mason and/or Roy Kellino. Most notably, she co-starred with James Mason in the films The Upturned Glass and Charade (directed by Roy Kellino), both of which she also co-wrote. The Masons co-produced the films I Met a Murderer and Lady Possessed, both of which were directed by Roy Kellino and lost money. Pamela Mason also had small roles in a number of other films starring James Mason.

Later films in which she appeared without James Mason included The Child (1954) (a short film directed by James Mason, in which their daughter Portland also appeared), Sex Kittens Go to College (1960), Five Minutes to Live (1961) and The Sandpiper (1965).

== Television ==
In the mid-1950s, the Masons appeared together on a short-lived variety show, The James Mason Show. Pamela Mason was a contestant on many episodes of the TV quiz show You Bet Your Life, hosted by Groucho Marx. She changed her name, dialect, and style look every time she appeared on that show, except that her allure always captivated Groucho. In the 1960s, she hosted two talk shows: The Pamela Mason Show (1965-1966) and The Weaker (?) Sex (1968–69) which featured female guests.

From the late 1950s through the 1970s, she made occasional guest appearances on various TV series, including Playhouse 90, Love, American Style and Wonder Woman. Her last acting appearance was in a made-for-television biographical film of Errol Flynn in 1985.

Mason was a regular guest on The Merv Griffin Show in the 1960s and 1970s.

== Stage ==
Before her marriage to James Mason and subsequent move to Hollywood, Pamela Mason (as Pamela Kellino) appeared in a number of London stage productions, including several that she co-financed, co-wrote or appeared in with James Mason. In 1947, she made her American stage debut in the title role of the Broadway show Bathsheba, in which James Mason co-starred as "David"; it closed after only 29 performances.

== Writing ==
In addition to her screenwriting work, Mason authored a number of books, both fiction and non-fiction, some of which were published under the name "Pamela Kellino". Her novel Del Palma (1948), dismissed by Kirkus Reviews as "trash", became the basis for the film Lady Possessed, which the Masons co-produced.

Other titles by Mason include the novel Ignoramus, Ignoramus (1950) (illustrated by James Mason); The Cats in Our Lives (1949), about the cats and other animals owned by the Masons (co-written and illustrated by James Mason); Marriage Is the First Step Toward Divorce (1968); and The Female Pleasure Hunt (1972).

== Business ==
Mason was the controlling stockholder of Illingworth, Morris, a textile firm previously controlled by her father and uncle. She also ran a mail-order vitamin company and managed property in Las Vegas, Nevada, and Los Angeles.

== Death ==
On 29 June 1996, Mason died of heart failure at her home in Beverly Hills, California. She was survived by her son and daughter. Her daughter passed away in 2004.She is buried in Westwood Village Memorial Park Cemetery in Los Angeles.

== Filmography ==
Film
Year	Film	Role	Notes
1934	Jew Suss	Naomi Oppenheimer	Credited as Pamela Kellino
1939	Prince of Peace	Mary	Credited as Pamela Kellino
1939	I Met a Murderer	Jo Trent	Writer, credited as Pamela Kellino
1945	They Were Sisters	Margaret Lee	Credited as Pamela Kellino
1947	The Upturned Glass	Kate Howard	Writer, credited as Pamela Kellino
1949	Caught	Mrs Fuller	Uncredited
1951	Pandora and the Flying Dutchman	Jenny	Credited as Pamela Kellino
1952	Lady Possessed	Sybil	Writer, story
1953	Charade	The Artist/Pamela/Baroness Tanslan/Lilly	Writer, credited as Pamela Kellino
1954	The Child	Janet	
1960	College Confidential	Edna Blake	
1960	Sex Kittens Go to College	Dr. Myrtle Carter	
1961	Five Minutes to Live	Ellen Harcourt	Alternative titles: Door-to-Door Maniac; Last Blood
1965	The Sandpiper	Ellie	Uncredited
1966	The Navy vs. the Night Monsters	Marie	Alternative titles: Monsters of the Night; The Night Crawlers
1968	Wild in the Streets	Pamela Mason	Uncredited
1970	Everything You Always Wanted to Know About Sex* (*But Were Afraid to Ask)	Pamela Mason	
Television
Year	Title	Role	Notes
1953	Omnibus	Josephine	1 episode
1954	Schlitz Playhouse of Stars	Josephine	1 episode
1956	G.E. Summer Originals		1 episode
1956	The James Mason Show	Herself	Multiple episodes
1957	Panic!		1 episode
1957	General Electric Theater	Iris Sebastian	1 episode
1957–1958	Playhouse 90	Various roles	3 episodes
1958	Jane Wyman Presents	-	Writer, 1 episode
1970	Love, American Style		2 episodes
1973	The New Dick Van Dyke Show		1 episode
1977	Wonder Woman	Carla Burgess	1 episode
1985	My Wicked, Wicked Ways... The Legend of Errol Flynn	Phoebe Straight	Television movie, (Last appearance)

== Radio appearances ==
Year	Programme	Episode/source
1952	Suspense	Odd Man Out
