= Ann Stephens =

British actress (1931–1966)

Ann Stephens (21 May 1931 – 12 August 1959) was a British child actress and singer, who was popular in the 1940s. She was born in London, the daughter of Lucian and Kathleen Stephens, with an elder sister Jill and a younger sister Helen (who was also a child actor). In July 1941 she recorded several songs, including a popular version of "The Teddy Bears' Picnic", "Dicky Bird Hop" (with Franklin Engelmann) and a setting by Harold Fraser-Simson of one of A. A. Milne's verses about Christopher Robin, "Buckingham Palace," which was often featured on the BBC Light Programme's Children's Favourites. In the same year, Stephens had made her recording debut as Alice in musical adaptations of Lewis Carroll's Alice's Adventures in Wonderland and Through the Looking Glass. She was chosen for this role from some 700 applicants auditioned by the record company His Master's Voice.

Later in the 1940s, Stephens appeared in several films, including In Which We Serve (1942), Fanny By Gaslight (1944), The Upturned Glass (1947) and Your Witness (1950). In the 1950s she turned her attention to television drama. A surviving Pathé newsreel of 1945 records her visit to the Hospital for Sick Children in Great Ormond Street, London, for which her gramophone recordings had raised £8,000. Stephens also appeared as a beautiful daughter of a Viking in the 1957 episode of The Adventures of Sir Lancelot titled "The Lesser Breed". She died suddenly in New York on 12 August 1959 at the age of 28.

== Selected discography ==
- "Ann's Nursery Rhymes" (based on Mother Goose rhymes)
- "Buckingham Palace" (lyrics by A. A. Milne, music by Harold Fraser-Simson)
- "Christopher Robin (Vespers)" (from A. A. Milne's When We Were Very Young; conducted by Clifford Greenwood)
- "Dicky Bird Hop" (written by Ron Gourley, conducted by Henry Geehl)
- Songs set to poems from Lewis Carroll's Alice in Wonderland
- "The Teddy Bears' Picnic" (music by John Walter Bratton, lyrics by Jimmy Kennedy, conducted by Henry Geehl
- "Wedding of the Gingerbreads" (conducted by Clifford Greenwood)
- "King Wenceslas – A Christmas Play" (with Arthur Askey and Florence Desmond, narrated by Frank Phillips, music by Charles Williams) His Master's Voice C3640/1 Nov. 1947

== Selected filmography ==
- In Which We Serve (1942)
- Dear Octopus (1943)
- Fanny by Gaslight (1944)
- They Were Sisters (1945)
- The Upturned Glass (1947)
- No Room at the Inn (1948)
- Your Witness (1950)
- The Franchise Affair (1951)
- The Good Beginning (1953)
- Son of a Stranger (1957)
