= Five Minutes to Live =

1961 film by Bill Karn

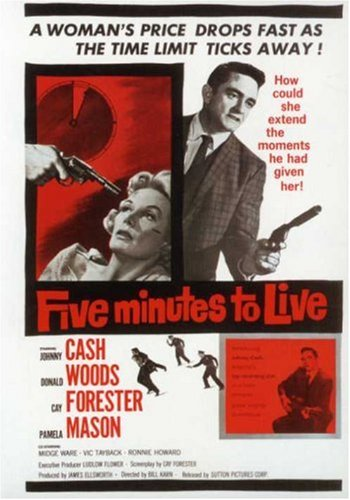
- Theatrical release poster
- Directed by: Bill Karn
- Screenplay by: Cay Forrester
- Story by: Palmer Thompson
- Produced by: James Ellsworth; Ludlow Flower
- Starring: Johnny Cash; Donald Woods; Cay Forrester; Pamela Mason; Vic Tayback
- Cinematography: Carl E. Guthrie
- Edited by: Donald Nosseck
- Production company: Somera Productions-Flower Film Productions
- Distributed by: Sutton Pictures
- Release date: December 7, 1961 (United States)
- Running time: 80 minutes
- Country: United States
- Language: English
- Budget: $300,000
- Box office: $5,655,000

Five Minutes to Live

Five Minutes to Live is a 1961 American neo-noir crime film directed by Bill Karn. It was retitled Door-to-Door Maniac for an American International Pictures rerelease in 1966. The film stars Johnny Cash, in his first theatrical film role, Donald Woods, Vic Tayback, and Cay Forrester, who wrote the screenplay and whose husband, Ludlow Flower, produced. Cash performed the film's title song, with a guitar solo by Merle Travis, who also appears in the film as Max.

== Plot ==
Fred Dorella sits in a dark room, detailing his most recent bank robbery and talking about how he teamed with hardened criminal Johnny Cabot to execute his plan. Cabot plans to take Nancy Wilson, wife of the bank's vice president Ken Wilson, as a hostage. He intends to hold her until Fred calls confirming that they have the ransom money. Cabot watches the Wilson house as Ken leaves for work and their son Bobby heads off to school. Posing as a door-to-door guitar instructor, Cabot talks his way into the house and takes Nancy hostage.

At the bank, Fred enters Ken's office and demands a $70,000 ransom to spare Nancy's life. He tells Ken to call home for proof that Nancy is being held hostage, then informs him that if he does not call Cabot again in five minutes, Nancy will die. Ken responds that he has been planning to leave Nancy to abscond to Las Vegas with his mistress Ellen. He tells Fred that he will be doing him a favor by killing his wife. Fred does not believe that Wilson will let his wife die. He is proven correct when Ken finally cracks and agrees to pay the ransom.

Fred calls Cabot and starts the clock again. After the five minutes have passed, Fred presses Ken to hurry. Meanwhile, at the Wilson house, Cabot is enjoying terrorizing his hostage. He begins forcing her to listen to his songs about her impending demise, shooting at her, and making sexual advances. Back at the bank, Fred has been captured by the police, who arrived after someone tripped the silent alarm. Cabot grows nervous after not receiving the expected call from Fred. Bobby returns home for lunch.

The police arrive outside the house. In a panic, Cabot grabs Bobby and attempts to flee, running right into police gunfire. Bobby pretends that he has been shot to encourage Cabot to release him. Upset by the apparent shooting of the young boy, Cabot returns fires and is killed by the police. Nancy runs outside to find her son still alive and well. Fred finishes recounting his story to the police, as Ken drives to Las Vegas with his wife, not his mistress.

== Cast ==
- Johnny Cash as Johnny Cabot
- Donald Woods as Ken Wilson
- Cay Forrester as Nancy Wilson
- Pamela Mason as Ellen Harcourt
- Vic Tayback as Fred Dorella
- Ron Howard as Bobby Wilson (credited as Ronnie Howard)
- Merle Travis as Max
- Midge Ware as Doris Johnson
- Norma Varden as Priscilla Auerbach

== Remake ==
A proposed remake of the film to be directed by Jan de Bont was announced in 2012.

== See also ==
- List of films featuring home invasions
- List of films in the public domain in the United States
