= Midge Ware =

American actress (1927–2020)

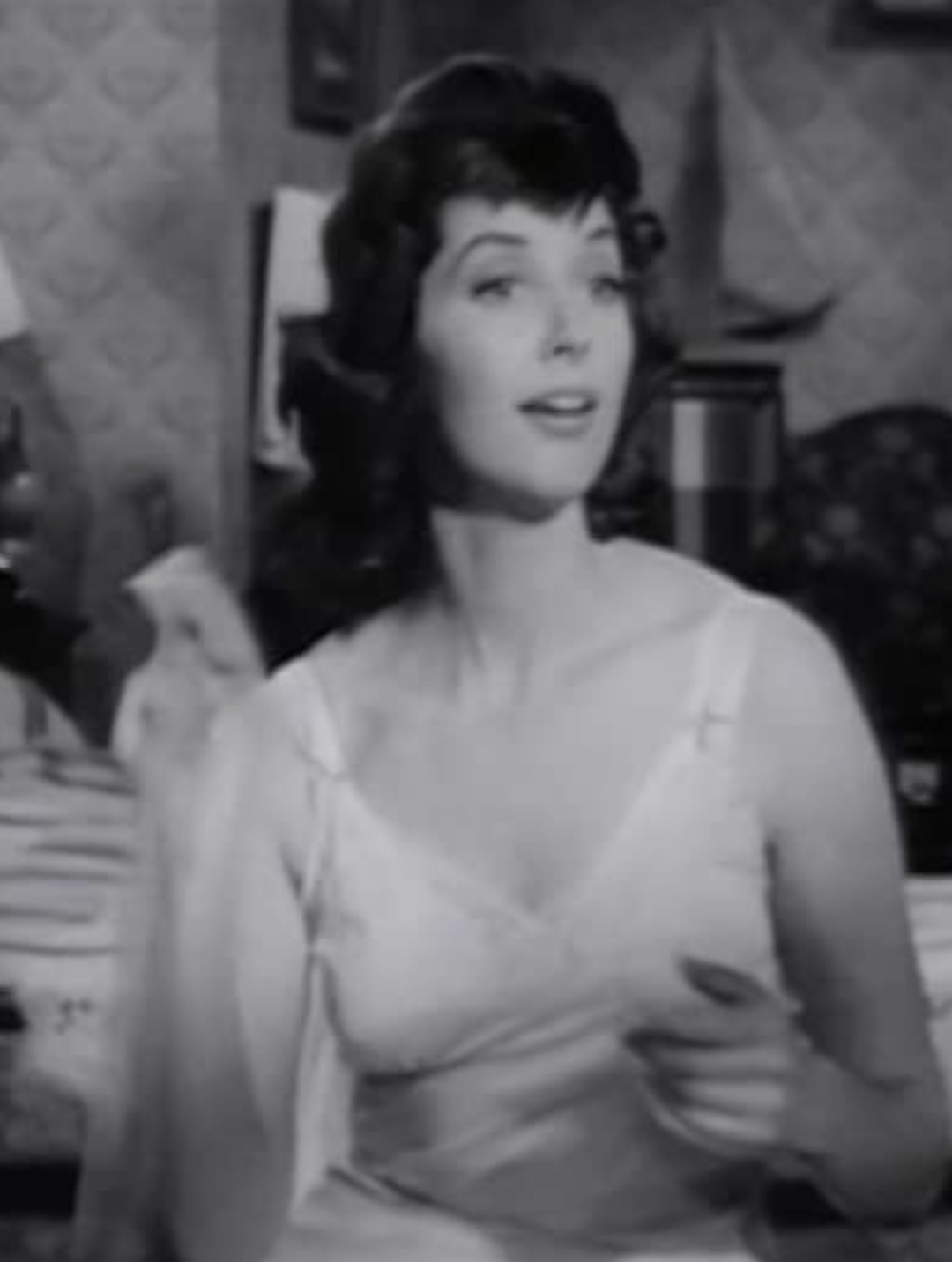
- Ware in Five Minutes to Live (1961)
- Born: Muriel Florence Bendelson; October 20, 1927; The Bronx, New York, U.S.
- Died: June 3, 2020 (aged 92); Westlake Village, California, U.S.
- Occupations: Actress; model
- Years active: 1951–1980
- Spouse(s): Alvin (Al) Weitz (m. ca. 1945; div. 19??); Art Batanides (m. 1954; div. 196?); David Moessinger (m. 1965; div. 19??); Ernie Colton (m. 19??)

Midge Ware Colton (born Muriel Florence Bendelson; October 20, 1927 – June 3, 2020) was an American model and stage, screen and television actress. She had a career lasting over 30 years in the show business.

== Early life ==
Born in The Bronx, New York, Ware was the daughter of taxi driver Samuel Bendelson and Mitzi Restenbaum Bendelson. She had twin brothers. Her schoolmates nicknamed her Midge, and she eventually had that made her legal name. She graduated from George Washington High School in Manhattan.

== Career ==
Before she became an actress, Ware was a model whose picture was used on the magazine covers more than 100 times. Universal signed her to a film contract in 1950. She debuted on film in Bedtime for Bonzo (1951).

Ware performed on Broadway in The Fifth Season (1953) and Maybe Tuesday (1958).

On television, Ware was guest hostess on Truth or Consequences, and she portrayed Louise Scruggs on The Beverly Hillbillies. She made guest appearances in episodes of television sitcoms and dramas, including The Donna Reed Show, Gunslinger, The Phil Silvers Show, The Rifleman, Police Woman, and Quincy, M.E..

== Volunteer work ==
Ware gave decades of volunteer service to the Motion Picture & Television Fund's retirement community and hospital, in the Woodland Hills neighborhood of Los Angeles. In 2016, she received US President's Lifetime Achievement Award, recognizing this work.

== Personal life ==
On August 7, 1954, Ware married actor Art Batanides in Las Vegas. It was her second marriage. They had two children together, son Jason and daughter Leslie Ann, before they divorced in the early 1960s. Her third marriage was to David Moessinger, a director and writer, in 1965; they had a daughter together, Amy, before divorcing at some unknown date. Her fourth husband was Ernie Colton, and she was stepmother to son Craig; the couple had been married for many years at the time of her death.

== Death ==
She died on June 3, 2020, aged 92, in Westlake Village, California.
