= The Upturned Glass =

1947 British film by Lawrence Huntington

- Theatrical release poster
- Directed by: Lawrence Huntington
- Written by: Pamela Kellino; Jno. P. Monaghan
- Produced by: Betty E. Box; Sydney Box; James Mason
- Starring: James Mason; Rosamund John; Pamela Kellino; Ann Stephens; Henry Oscar
- Cinematography: Reginald H. Wyer
- Edited by: Alan Osbiston
- Music by: Bernard Stevens
- Production company: Triton Films
- Distributed by: General Film Distributors (UK); Universal (USA)
- Release date: 17 June 1947
- Running time: 90 minutes
- Country: United Kingdom
- Language: English
- Budget: £196,000
- Box office: £211,300 (by Dec 1949) or £241,000

The Upturned Glass is a 1947 British film noir psychological thriller directed by Lawrence Huntington and starring James Mason, Rosamund John and Pamela Kellino. The screenplay concerns a leading brain surgeon who murders a woman he believes to be responsible for the death of the woman he loved.

It was made at Gainsborough Pictures' Islington Studios, with sets designed by the art director Andrew Mazzei. It was made as an independent production overseen by Sydney Box, then head of Gainsborough.

== Plot ==
Michael Joyce, a Harley Street brain specialist, unhappily married and separated from his wife, falls in love with Emma Wright when she brings her young daughter Ann for consultation. Unfortunately, neither is free to marry, so the affair ends almost as soon as it begins. Later, however, Emma dies after a fall from her country manor's second-storey bedroom window. Upon hearing of the tragedy, Michael attends the coroner's inquest, where Ann and Emma's sister-in-law, Kate Howard, both testify. Emma's death is ruled accidental, but Michael suspects foul play. To gain information, he romances Kate, who is unaware that Michael was Emma's lover though she knew Emma was seeing someone. Eventually, Michael learns that Kate intended to blackmail Emma for financial gain. He considers the situation a misjustice and resolves to take matters into his own hands.

One afternoon, Michael drives Kate to Emma's country house, where Michael manoeuvres her into the same upper-storey bedroom from which Emma fell. He then carries out his revenge, pushing Kate out the same window. Retrieving her corpse from the courtyard below and placing it in the car's back, he drives toward the cliffs just over the sea, where he intends to dispose of Kate's body. On the way, however, he encounters a stranded doctor, a general practitioner, who begs a ride to the home of a patient, a 12-year-old girl whose survival of a head injury is doubtful. But when the doctor asks Michael for a second opinion, the latter examines the child and decides she might have a chance. And to the immense relief of the patient's family, Michael succeeds in saving her life.

Resuming his trek toward the sea with Kate's body, Michael undergoes the realization that he is not "perfectly sane" and that perhaps his status as a "valuable member of society" is indeed questionable. He stands at the edge of the cliff and looks down toward the sea—and then, just as in the case of both Emma and Kate, he falls downward to his own death.

== Cast ==
- James Mason as Michael Joyce
- Rosamund John as Emma Wright
- Pamela Kellino as Kate Howard
- Ann Stephens as Ann Wright
- Morland Graham as Clay
- Brefni O'Rorke as Dr. Farrell
- Henry Oscar as coroner
- Jane Hylton as Miss Marsh
- Sheila Huntington as 1st girl student
- Susan Shaw as 2nd girl student
- Peter Cotes as male student
- Nuna Davey as Mrs. Deva
- Judith Carol as Joan Scott-Trotter
- Jno. P. Monaghan as U.S. driver
- Maurice Denham as mobile policeman
- Janet Burnell as Sylvia
- Margaret Withers as party guest
- Beatrice Varley as injured girl's mother
- Hélène Burls as farm labourer's wife
- Howard Douglas as lorry driver
- Richard Afton as lorry driver's Mate
- Lyn Evans as county policeman

== Production ==
In the mid 1940s James Mason was the biggest star in British films, coming off successes like They Were Sisters (1945), The Seventh Veil (1945) and The Wicked Lady (1945).

Mason and his then wife, Pamela Kellino (Mason), had originally planned to develop a film on the Brontë family entitled The Upturned Glass, written by Pamela and starring James as Branwell Brontë. They dropped the idea after learning of the Hollywood production Devotion, and instead developed a psychological thriller under the same title, in which both Masons would play leading roles.

The film was based on a story by American serviceman Jno. P. Monaghan, whom the Masons had befriended when touring the US for the American Red Cross. Kellino and Monaghan worked on the story together, and Monaghan appeared in a small role as an American military truck driver. In the original draft of the script, Mason was to play a detective and the film was to focus around a school mistress. However after Mason was unable to secure the services of the actors they wanted, Celia Johnson and Phyllis Calvert, the script was rewritten. The new script had nothing to do with an upturned glass but they decided to keep the title because it had received considerable publicity.

James Mason co-produced the film with Sydney Box, with whom he had previously worked on the Academy-Award-winning The Seventh Veil. For his work on The Upturned Glass, Mason, who at the time had "enormous drawing power", received the equivalent of $240,000 in U.S. dollars, plus a percentage of the profits.

The project was announced in February 1946 with the co stars originally to be Kellino, Rosamund John and Robert Newton. It was to follow production of Odd Man Out (1947). Mason was doing the film under his contract with Rank, having turned down Hungry Hill (1947).

Filming began at Riverside Studio in June 1946.

Mason made it just before leaving for the US.

In March 1947 J Arthur Rank sent editor Allan Obiston to the USA for Mason's thoughts on the cut.

== Reception ==
=== Box office ===
According to trade papers, the film was a "notable box office attraction" at British cinemas in 1947.

The film earned producer's receipts of £156,000 in the UK and £85,800 overseas.

According to Rank's own records the film had made a profit of £45,500 for the company by December 1949.

== Critical ==
The Monthly Film Bulletin wrote: "After a rather long-drawn-out beginning, where Mason fans will get much Mason, the story develops rapidly to a grand, exciting, fast-moving dénouement. Flawless crimes, the film argues, simply do not exist, and when paranoia intervenes there isn't a hope. Even the country doctor and the medical student make better diagnoses than the trained, experienced specialist, and as the student so aptly says, a paranoiac has to tell someone."

The Radio Times Guide to Films gave the film 3/5 stars, writing: "In his last British film before taking off for Hollywood, James Mason returned to the kind of brooding figure that female audiences had adored in The Seventh Veil and Odd Man Out. ... Heavily contrived, but Mason's performance and Lawrence Huntington's directorial flair keep you hooked."

In British Sound Films: The Studio Years 1928–1959 David Quinlan rated the film as "good", writing: "Psychological thriller with charismatic performance from the star."
