= Concerning Mr. Martin =

1937 British film by Roy Kellino

- William Devlin, Marjorie Peacock and Wilson Barrett in the film
- Directed by: Roy Kellino
- Written by: Ernest Dudley; Richard Llewellyn (additional dialogue)
- Story by: Ernest Dudley
- Produced by: John Findlay
- Starring: Wilson Barrett; William Devlin; Marjorie Peacock
- Cinematography: Stanley Grant
- Edited by: Ralph Kemplen
- Music by: Colin Wark
- Production company: Fox-British Pictures
- Distributed by: Twentieth Century Fox (UK)
- Release date: March 1937 (UK)
- Running time: 59 minutes
- Country: United Kingdom
- Language: English

Concerning Mr. Martin is a 1937 British thriller film directed by Roy Kellino and starring Wilson Barrett, William Devlin and Marjorie Peacock. It was written by Ernest Dudley and Richard Llewellyn, and made at Teddington Studios as a quota quickie.

== Plot ==
Gentleman crook Leo Martin hears that young Robin Cavanagh is losing heavily at the gaming tables run by the unscrupulous night-club owner Gartell. Taking pity on Cavanagh he schemes to get his debt paid by Gartell, and frames Gartell for a robbery which he committed himself. He meets and is attracted to Gloria, singer at the club, but he decides to remain a lone wolf.

== Cast ==
- Wilson Barrett as Leo Martin
- William Devlin as Gartell
- Lionel Montgomery as Foo
- Marjorie Peacock as Gloria
- Derek Williams as Robin Cavanagh
- Madge Somers as Mary
- Herbert Cameron as detective
- Billy Wells as commissionaire
- Peter Popp as elderly man
- André Sterlini
- Paul Sheridan as croupier

== Critical reception ==
Kine Weekly wrote: "There is more talk than action, but the pace is reasonably smooth, and the quality of suspense is not ignored. Competent acting on the part of the principals is the film's standby. ...The theme of this crime drama has some claim to ingenuity, and the technical qualities are a little more polished than usual, but there are moments when precious dialogue gets the upper hand, and others when the inexperienced supporting players let the detail down."

The Daily Film Renter wrote: "Put over mainly in terms of dialogue, the story lacks action, while there is no overplus of incident, two major drawbacks to any film. There is, however, a fair degree, of interest in the climax, when one crook puts the other to rout. Night-club and gambling den settings are well staged, and a tuneful song number introduced at one point, even though it may not contribute much to the dramatic values."

Picture Show wrote: "This film is well above the usual run of quota pictures. It is quite an ingenious story of crook versus crook – in this case, a gentleman thief pitting his wits against a crooked night-club owner who cheats a youngster of a large sum of money. Wilson Barrett gives an efficient performance in the leading role of the thief (who does not reform in the last reel), and is quite well supported. Settings and direction are good."
