= The Clock (radio series) =

Radio series

The Clock is a radio suspense anthology series broadcast November 3, 1946 – May 23, 1948, on ABC. Narrated by Father Time, the 30-minute program was created by Lawrence Klee. It was first broadcast from New York with Clark Andrews as director featuring New York radio talent. Beginning with the March 4, 1948 episode, ABC shifted production of the series to Hollywood, because director William Spier was available after he had left radio's "outstanding theater of thrills" Suspense on January 24.

The first show from Hollywood was called "Nicky." It guest starred Cathy Lewis and Elliott Lewis. William Conrad was the narrator. Other episodes featured Jeanette Nolan and Hans Conried. However, sponsorship was not forthcoming and ABC cancelled the series after twelve weeks. Spier was back as producer—but not director—of Suspense in 1949.

Starting in 1955, a version of the program was produced in Australia by Grace Gibson Productions.

== Listen to ==
- The Clock in the Internet Archive's Old-Time Radio Collection
