= Sylvia Coleridge =

British actress (1909–1986)

- Coleridge playing Mrs. Salt, in the episode "The Gamble" of The Onedin Line
- Born: Kathleen Sylvia Duke Coleridge; 10 December 1909; Darjeeling, British India (present-day India)
- Died: 31 May 1986 (aged 76); London, England
- Occupation: Actress

Sylvia Coleridge (10 December 1909 – 31 May 1986) was a British stage, film, radio and television actress. Her credits included Tess (1979), The Avengers, Dixon of Dock Green, The Onedin Line, Survivors, Blake's 7, The Tomorrow People, Z-Cars, Doctor Who, Shoestring, Angels, Rumpole of the Bailey, and the BBC's adaptation of Bleak House in 1985.

== Early life ==
Coleridge was born on 10 December 1909 in Darjeeling, British India, now India.

== Career ==
After Coleridge made her stage debut in 1931, her theatre work included appearances at The Old Vic, the Malvern Festival and with the Royal Shakespeare Company.

Coleridge's television acting credits include: Out of the Unknown, The Avengers, Paul Temple, The Lotus Eaters, Ace of Wands, The Tomorrow People, Z-Cars, Public Eye, Sutherland's Law, Dixon of Dock Green, The Onedin Line, Survivors, Armchair Thriller (in the serial Quiet as a Nun), Blake's 7 (in the episode Gambit as the Croupier), Shoestring, The Flipside of Dominick Hide, Angels, Funny Man, Rumpole of the Bailey, Artemis 81, Bleak House, and the sitcom Maggie and Her.

Coleridge made a guest appearance in the Doctor Who serial The Seeds of Doom (1976). Tom Baker mentioned on the "Special Edition" DVD commentary for The Robots of Death that he had been so taken with Coleridge's eccentric performance in the serial that he had later suggested her as the new Doctor Who companion to producer Graham Williams.

== Death ==
Coleridge died on 31 May 1986, in London.

== Filmography ==
| Year | Title | Role | Notes |
|---|---|---|---|
| 1937 | Cross My Heart | Alice | |
| 1939 | I Met a Murderer | Martha Warrow | |
| 1940 | Jailbirds | Mrs. Smith | |
| 1971 | The Raging Moon | Celia | |
| 1971 | Jude the Obscure | Miss Fontover | 2 episodes |
| 1979 | Tess | Mrs. d'Urberville | |
| 1979 | The Human Factor | Mrs. Halliday | |
| 1984 | Secret Places | Miss Trott | |
