= William Devlin (actor) =

Scottish actor (1911–1987)

in The Avengers episode, The Outside-In Man (1964)

William Devlin (5 December 1911 – 25 January 1987) was a Scottish actor who appeared widely in films and television in a screen career that lasted from 1937 until 1967. The son of an architect, he was born in Aberdeen in 1911. An older brother was Lord Devlin.

== Education ==
Devlin was educated at Stonyhurst College, where he was Head of the School, and at Merton College, Oxford, where he matriculated in 1930.

== Career ==
His first stage appearance was with Nancy Price in the play Nurse Cavell by C. S. Forester and C. E. Bechhofer Roberts. In this play he had the role of the spy who betrayed Edith Cavell.

A noted Shakespearean actor, Devlin first played King Lear aged 22. He was one of the youngest actors to undertake a major portrayal of what was considered the most difficult of Shakespearean roles; critic James Agate wrote of Devlin's performance at the Westminster Theatre, "His understanding of the text and his sense of beauty are everywhere apparent". Devlin won further acclaim with his performance as Peer Gynt and in historical roles.

In 1936, he played French politician Georges Clemenceau in The Tiger, the first play to be televised by the BBC.

He made his first film appearance in 1937 in The Mill on the Floss, and soon built up steady work as a character actor, particularly after appearing in Jamaica Inn.

Devlin served in the British Army throughout the Second World War, spending four and a half years with the Eighth Army in Africa and Italy.

Devlin retired from acting in 1967, but reprised his King Lear role in Episode 6 ("Protest and Communication") of Kenneth Clark's 1969 BBC-TV series Civilisation. His portrayal of Lear can be heard in its entirety on the Marlowe Society recording of the complete play.

== Personal life ==
He was married twice: first to Mary Casson, daughter of Lewis Casson and Sybil Thorndike, and secondly to Meriel Moore.

Devlin died in 1987 in Somerset, England.

== Filmography ==
- The Mill on the Floss (1936) as Bob Jakin
- Concerning Mr. Martin (1937) as Martell
- The Mutiny of the Elsinore (1937) as O'Sullivan
- I Met a Murderer (1939) as Jay
- Jamaica Inn (1939) as Burdkin, Sir Humphrey's Tenant
- Treasure Island (1950) as Morgan
- Blood of the Vampire (1958) as Kurt Urach
- Solomon and Sheba (1959) as Nathan
- Oscar Wilde (1960) as Solicitor-General
- The Jokers (1967) as Brigadier
- The Shuttered Room (1967) as Zebulon Whately (final film role)
