= Son of a Stranger =

1957 British film by Ernest Morris

- Ann Stephens and James Kenny in a still from the film
- Directed by: Ernest Morris
- Written by: Stanley Miller
- Produced by: Edward J. Danziger; Harry Lee Danziger
- Starring: James Kenney; Ann Stephens; Victor Maddern
- Music by: Albert Elms
- Release date: 1957
- Country: United Kingdom
- Language: English

Son of a Stranger is a 1957 British second feature ('B') film directed by Ernest Morris and starring James Kenney, Ann Stephens and Victor Maddern. It was written by Stanley Miller and produced by The Danzigers.

== Plot ==
Delinquent slum boy Tom Adams is obsessed that his unknown father is a rich aristocrat. His mother, dying, refuses to say. Tom goes in search of his father and traces him to a Cornish village, committing murder on the way. He discovers that the local doctor, Delaney, is his father. When Delaney is accidentally shot by his own rifle, Tom is suspected of his murder.

== Cast ==
- James Kenney as Tom Adams
- Ann Stephens as Joannie
- Victor Maddern as Lenny
- Basil Dignam as Dr. Delaney
- Catherine Finn as Mrs. Adams
- Diana Chesney as Mrs. Peck
- Gladys Boot as old lady
- Hal Osmond as barman
- Len Sharp
- Frank Henderson
- Colin Tapley

== Reception ==
The Monthly Film Bulletin wrote: "The sheer incredibility of this melodrama in the high Victorian manner holds the attention. The succession of long, static scenes (clearly a low-budget requirement) recalls less ambitious television productions. Nothing is very convincing: the slum girl loses her fight against a Kensington accent, the rock'n'rollers in the squalid club are patently unable to rock'n'roll. It is remarkable that, in the teeth of this ludicrous plot, James Kenney almost succeeds in making the main character convincing."

Picturegoer wrote: "Any tears to spare for a young lout who beats up old women? It's not the fault of James Kenney if you remain dry-eyed through this brutal tear-jerker. He doesn't get much chance to work up sympathy for the neurotic ex-convict, mouldering in a tenement slum with a hate complex for his mother and a half-crazed conviction that his unknown father is a blue-blood. When he goes in search of his inheritance he leaves a messy trail of murder behind. The seamy slumland has a sour sharpness, but the plot is flatly unconvincing. James Kenney, an acutely sensitive actor, and Ann Stephens, as his girl friend, have a thankless task breathing life into this cardboard melodrama."

In British Sound Films: The Studio Years 1928–1959 David Quinlan rated the film as "mediocre", writing: "Squalid, very low budget morality play is ludicrously unconvincing."
