= Lady Possessed =

1952 American film by Roy Kellino

- Lobby card
- Directed by: William Spier; Roy Kellino
- Screenplay by: Pamela Mason; James Mason
- Based on: novel Del Palma by Pamela Mason
- Produced by: James Mason
- Starring: James Mason; June Havoc; Stephen Dunne; Fay Compton; Pamela Kellino
- Cinematography: Karl Struss
- Edited by: Arthur Roberts
- Music by: Nathan Scott
- Color process: Black and white
- Production company: Portland Pictures
- Distributed by: Republic Pictures
- Release date: January 26, 1952
- Running time: 87 minutes
- Country: United States
- Language: English

Lady Possessed is a 1952 American mystery film noir directed by William Spier and Roy Kellino and starring James Mason and June Havoc. Mason and his wife Pamela, Kellino's former wife, produced and wrote the film based on Pamela's novel Del Palma (originally published as A Lady Possessed in the United Kingdom in 1943).

The film's sets were designed by the art director Frank Arrigo.

== Plot ==
While barely conscious, Jean Wilson, a patient in a London hospital, overhears Jimmy Del Palma berating hospital staff for their treatment of his wife, who dies shortly afterward. To recuperate following a miscarriage, Jean coincidentally rents the former country home of Del Palma, a famous pianist, and his wife. She falls in love with Del Palma and dreams of taking his dead wife's identity. With the encouragement of her friend Sybil, Jean arranges a séance with a medium in an attempt to contact the dead woman.

== Cast ==
- James Mason as Jimmy Del Palma
- June Havoc as Jean Wilson
- Stephen Dunne as Tom Wilson
- Fay Compton as Mme. Brune
- Pamela Mason as Sybil (as Pamela Kellino)
- Steven Geray as Dr. Stepanek
- Diana Graves as medium
- Odette Myrtil as Mrs. Burrows
- Eileen Erskine as Violet
- John Monaghan as Dave
- Vivian Bonnell as Calypso Singer (as Enid Mosier)
- Judy Osborne as Secretary
- Alma Lawton as Nurse

== Reception ==
In a contemporary review for The New York Times, critic Bosley Crowther called the film "a bleak little drama of neuroses" and wrote: "This dreary and meaningless twaddle is based, we are candidly told, upon a novel entitled 'Del Palma,' by Pamela Kellino, who is Mr. Mason's wife. She also appears at odd moments in a pseudo-Noel Cowardish role. And since Miss Kellino and Mr. Mason take credit for writing the script, the much celebrated English couple have only themselves to blame. That goes double for Mr. Mason, who also produced the film."

Reviewer Herb Michelson of Variety wrote: "There's little indication in 'Lady Possessed' ... of the virtuoso acting skill that Mason has demonstrated in the past. He walks through the role with little animation and gets virtually no support from Miss Havoc in her superficial playing of a difficult part that would take the skill and sensitivity of the best dramatic actress films or legit could offer to make it believable."

The film was a box-office failure, losing the Masons much of the money that they had invested in it.

== Bibliography ==
- Sweeney, Kevin. James Mason: A Bio-bibliography. Greenwood Publishing Group, 1999.
