= Charade (1953 film) =

1953 American film by Roy Kellino

- Directed by: Roy Kellino
- Written by: James Mason; Pamela Mason; Scott Forbes & Bruce Lester
- Based on: Duel at Dawn by Alexandre Dumas
- Produced by: James Mason
- Starring: James Mason; Pamela Mason
- Cinematography: Ernest Miller; Joseph F. Biroc
- Edited by: Maurice Wright
- Production company: Portland Pictures
- Distributed by: Monarch Film Corporation (UK)
- Release date: 1953
- Running time: 83 minutes
- Country: United States
- Language: English

Charade is a 1953 black and white American anthology film directed by Roy Kellino. It consists of a trio of short stories introduced by and starring James Mason and his wife Pamela.

== Plot ==
In "Portrait of a Murderer," a cynical young artist absentmindedly sketches her neighbour who, unbeknownst to her, is a murderer. In "Duel at Dawn," in 1880s Austria, two officers fight a duel for the love of a Baroness. In "The Midas Touch," Jonah Watson, a successful businessman in New York, is dissatisfied with his life, and moves to England to start again. Working as a servant, he falls in love with Lilly, a Cockney maid who dreams of bettering herself.

== Cast ==
- James Mason as The Murderer / Maj. Linden / Jonah Watson
- Pamela Mason as The Artist / Pamela / Baroness Tanslan / Lilly
- Scott Forbes as Capt. Stamm
- Paul Cavanagh as Col. Heisler
- Bruce Lester as Capt. van Buren
- John Dodsworth as Lt. Meyerdorf
- Judy Osborne as Dotty
- Sean McClory as Jack Stuydevant
- Vince Barnett as Berg
