= Helen Morningstar =

Geologist and paleontologist

- Born: September 23, 1891; Columbus, Ohio, US
- Died: July 31, 1951 (aged 59); Columbus, Ohio, US
- Education: Ohio State University(BA, MA); Bryn Mawr College (Ph.D.)
- Spouse: Raymond Lamborn
- Children: 2
- Scientific career
- Fields: Paleontology, Geology
- Institutions: Phi Beta Kappa, Sigma Xi, American Association for the Advancement of Science, Paleontological Society of America

Helen Morningstar was a geologist and paleontologist from Columbus, Ohio. She was born on September 23, 1891, and was an instructor for Ohio State University from 1917 to 1922. She died on July 31, 1951, at the age of 59 due to health complications.

== Biography ==
=== Education ===
Morningstar graduated from East Highschool in Columbus, Ohio in 1909. She furthered her studies in 1913, where she had earned a Bachelor of Arts degree from the Ohio State University. She decided to continue her schooling and received a Masters of Arts degree by 1915. During this time she was a graduate assistant for the English department of Ohio State University. She then decided to move to Pennsylvania and attended Bryn Mawr College, which offered higher education to women, where she earned her Ph.D. in philosophy in 1923. During her time of studies she gained the title of being one of Florence Bascom's top students. The faculty of Bryn Mawr College awarded Morningstar the President's European fellowship.

=== Career ===
Morningstar started her career as an instructor of geology and paleontology at Ohio State University from 1917 to 1923, and it was reported her salary at the time was estimated to be around $1,800.

She wrote three books during her career: The Fauna of the Pottsville Formation, Pottsville fauna of Ohio and 'Catalogue of Type Fossils in the Geological Museum at the Ohio State University' In 1923, Morningstar was commended by Professor Charles Schuchert of Yale and the once President of the Geological Society of America for her work of Pottsville Fauna of Ohio and praised its contributions towards Paleontology in the American Journal of Sciences.

After the publication of her novel The Fauna of the Pottsville Formation, she became a well recognized female geologist. This novel allowed her to inform the public of her research and share her findings. This novel was the formal takeoff of her career.

She also wrote a paper with Percy E. Raymond which discusses the future of Pennsylvanian formations in Illinois and the Appalachian basin. In addition, she had contributed 5 specimens of Carboniferous bryozoans from Ohio, which were added to the United States National Museum in the year 1922–1923. She also discovered a new species of Pennsylvanian pseudozygopleurid gastropod during her studies. It is distinguishable from other species by its coarse texture of the transverse cords, as well as the flatness of the whorl profile. The new species was named Gamizyga morningstarae in her honor.

With all of her outstanding accomplishments, her career ended up shifting from a paleontologist and geologist to a stay at home mother after the birth of her first child in 1923.

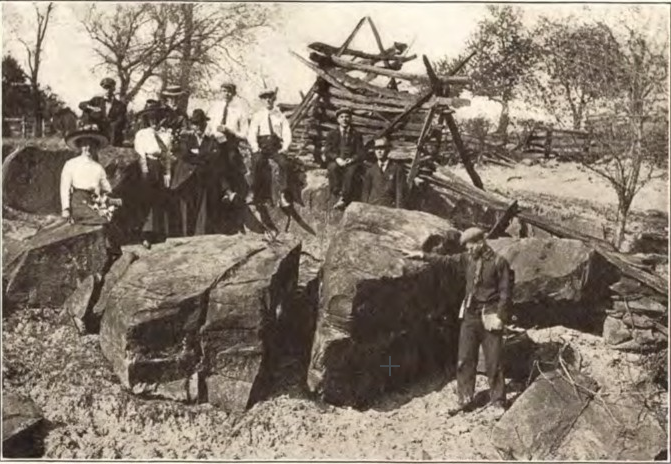
Pictured Helen Morningstar (2nd on the left) on a geological trip to Hartman Farm near Lithopolis during the spring of 1911. Taken by W.J. Kostir of the Department of Zoology at the Ohio State University.

=== Awards and recognition ===
- Elected Fellow of the Academy of Science in 1920
- Member of Phi Beta Kappa, a highly recognized academic society, reflecting her academic achievements
- Member of Sigma Xi, a scientific honor society
- the American Association for the Advancement of Science, which was the first organization promoting the development of science in the nation
- Paleontological Society of America, specifically devoted to advancing the science of paleontology.

=== Home life ===
Morningstar married Raymond Lamborn in 1922 and had 2 children named Charles and Martha Lamborn. Her marriage with Robert was controversial as it seemed she pursued family at the risk of her career.

=== Death ===
Morningstar died on July 31, 1951, in her hometown of Columbus, Ohio, at the age of 59 from arteriosclerosis and hypertension. She was buried at the Green Lawn Cemetery (Columbus, Ohio).

== Research ==
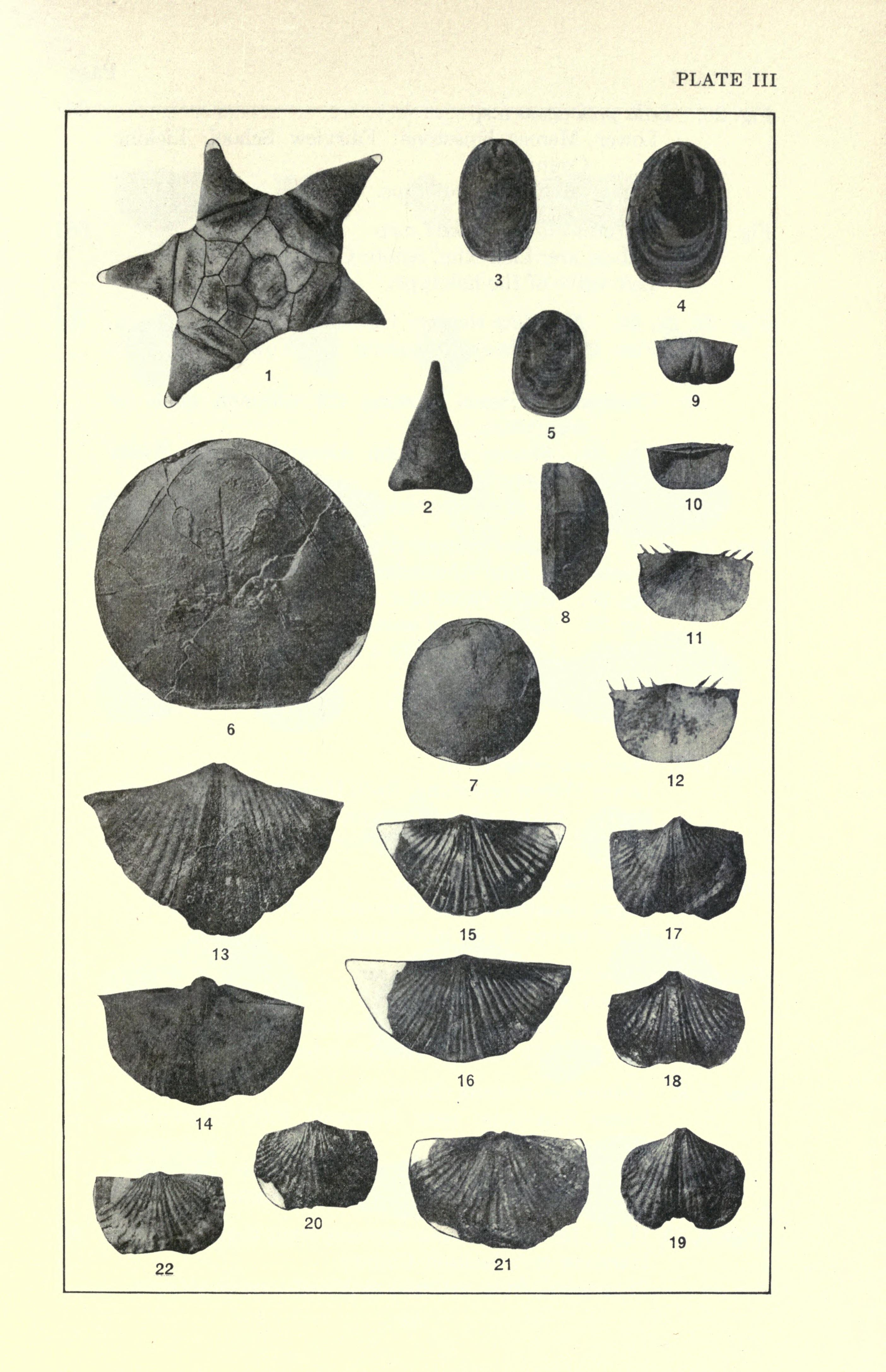
Examples of fossils Helen Morningstar discovered at the Pottsville Formation

Morningstar wrote a dissertation, which was published as part of her doctorate degree of philosophy, titled The Fauna of the Pottsville Formation of Ohio Below the Lower Merser Limestone (1922). Her study was focused on the Pottsville formation, varying from 100–350 feet, but averaging 255 feet in thickness and located at the base of the Pennsylvanian system. Her book discusses the stratigraphy and paleontology of the Pottsville formation, including 3 limestone horizons, boggs, upper and lower Mercer fossils collected at four localities The formation lacked clear division from the Allegheny formations due to shales creating a gradual transition between the formations. There was a large unconformity at the bottom of the formation, characteristic of irregularly shaped surface of the rocks. The shift in water levels and the alternation of marine sediment and coal was discovered and noted within the formation.

Research on the Economic Value of the Pottsville Formation: it is a considerable value, as it is a natural resource that accumulates wealth. The lower and upper mercer ores are especially important to economic contribution as they are thick and contain a high amount of iron content. Most of the coal content is used for local purposes, however it has been mined for commercial use as well.

Morningstar provided extensive research on the various members of the Pottsville formation and other geologists roles in their findings. She goes into detail of the different ores she had discovered throughout the counties in Ohio:

- The Harrison Ore – the oldest member, extremely patchy/ coarse texture, poor in iron content.
- The Sharon Ore – only found in extreme southern parts of Ohio, varies in thickness, buff/brown color, course, highly silicious.
- The Anthony Coal – a thin deposit of Coal laying over the Sciotoville clay.
- The Quakertown – above the Anthony coal, it is of importance for stratigraphic purposes only and is very important for wealth and economic purposes.
- The Bear Run Coal Horizon – the next fossiliferous horizon above the Quakertown coal.
- Lowerville (poverty run) limestone – the oldest of the marine line stones which occur in the Pennsylvanian system.
- The Boggs member – less than 2 inches thick, hard, blue, fossiliferous and good quality.

Helen gives excellent detail of the ores and fossils that were found through her exploration of the Pottsville Formation and documents her findings within her novel The Fauna of the Pottsville Formation of Ohio Below the Lower Merser Limestone (1922).
