= James Mason =

British actor (1909–1984)

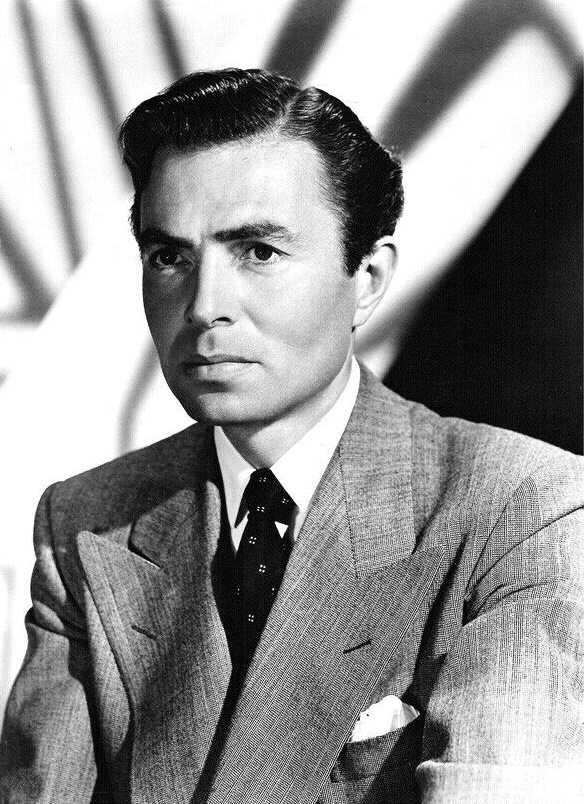
- Mason, 1940s
- Born: James Neville Mason; 15 May 1909; Huddersfield, West Riding of Yorkshire, England
- Died: 27 July 1984 (aged 75); Lausanne, Switzerland
- Education: Peterhouse, Cambridge
- Occupation: Actor
- Years active: 1931–1984
- Spouses: Pamela Mason (m. 1941; div. 1964) Clarissa Kaye (m. 1971)
- Children: Portland; Morgan
- Relatives: Belinda Carlisle (daughter-in-law)

James Neville Mason (/ˈmeɪsən/; 15 May 1909 – 27 July 1984) was an English actor. He achieved considerable success in British cinema before becoming a star in Hollywood. He was nominated for three Academy Awards, three Golden Globes (winning once) and two BAFTA Awards in his career.

Mason began his career as a stage actor on the West End, before moving into leading man roles in films during the early 1940s. He was the top box-office attraction in the UK in 1944 and 1945; his British films included The Seventh Veil (1945) and The Wicked Lady (1945). He starred in Odd Man Out (1947), the first recipient of the BAFTA Award for Best British Film.

Moving to the United States in the following decade, Mason starred in such films as George Cukor's A Star Is Born (1954) earning a Golden Globe for Best Actor in a Motion Picture – Musical or Comedy, Alfred Hitchcock's North by Northwest (1959), Stanley Kubrick's Lolita (1962), Warren Beatty's Heaven Can Wait (1978) and Sidney Lumet's The Verdict (1982).

He also starred in a number of successful British and American films from the 1950s to the early 1980s, including: The Desert Fox (1951), Julius Caesar (1953), 20,000 Leagues Under the Sea (1954), Bigger Than Life (1956), Journey to the Center of the Earth (1959), Georgy Girl (1966), Spring and Port Wine (1970) and The Boys from Brazil (1978). Following his death in 1984, his ashes were interred near the tomb of his friend, fellow English actor Charlie Chaplin.

== Early life, family and education ==
Mason was born on 15 May 1909 in Huddersfield, in the West Riding of Yorkshire, the youngest of three sons of John Mason and Mabel Hattersley, daughter of Joseph Shaw Gaunt. A wealthy wool merchant like his father, John Mason travelled often on business, mainly in France and Belgium. Mabel—who biographer Kevin Sweeney describes as "uncommonly well-educated," had lived in London to study and begin work as an artist before returning to Yorkshire to care for her father. According to Sweeney, she was "attentive and loving" in raising her sons.

The Masons lived in a house with grounds on Croft House Lane in Marsh. It was replaced in the mid-1970s by flats called Arncliffe Court. A small residential development opposite where the house once stood is now called James Mason Court.

Mason was educated at Marlborough College and took a first in architecture at Peterhouse, Cambridge, where he became involved in stock theatre companies in his spare time. He had no formal acting training and initially embarked upon it for fun.

== Career ==
=== 1931–1939: Early roles ===
After Cambridge, Mason made his stage debut in Aldershot in The Rascal in 1931. He joined the Old Vic theatre in London under the guidance of Tyrone Guthrie. He appeared in productions of The Cherry Orchard, Henry VIII, Measure for Measure, The Importance of Being Earnest, Love for Love, The Tempest, Twelfth Night, and Macbeth. Appearing in many of these were Charles Laughton and Elsa Lanchester. In the mid-1930s he also appeared at the Gate Theatre, Dublin, notably in Pride and Prejudice with Betty Chancellor. In 1933, Alexander Korda gave Mason a small role in The Private Life of Don Juan but sacked him three days into shooting.

From 1935 to 1938, Mason starred in many British quota quickies, starting with his first film Late Extra (1935) in which he played the lead. Albert Parker directed. Mason appeared in Twice Branded (1936) Troubled Waters (1936) also directed by Parker; Prison Breaker (1936) Blind Man's Bluff (1936) for Parker's The Secret of Stamboul (1936) and The Mill on the Floss (1936) an "A" movie. Mason had a key support role in Korda's Fire Over England (1937) with Laurence Olivier and Vivien Leigh. He was in another "A", The High Command (1937) directed by Thorold Dickinson, then went back to quickies, starring in Catch As Catch Can (1937) directed by Roy Kellino. Korda cast him as the villain in The Return of the Scarlet Pimpernel (1937)

Mason began appearing in some televised productions of plays, made in the very early days of television; Cyrano de Bergerac (1938) The Moon in the Yellow River (1938) Bees on the Boat-Deck (1939) Square Pegs (1939) L'Avare (1939) and The Circle (1939). He returned to features with I Met a Murderer (1939) based on a story by Mason and Pamela Kellino, who also starred with Mason and whom he would marry. Her husband Roy Kellino directed.

=== 1941–1957: Leading man status ===
Second World War

Mason registered as a conscientious objector during the Second World War (causing his family to break with him for many years) but his tribunal did not exempt him from the requirement for non-combatant military service, which he also refused. He appealed against that aspect of the tribunal's decision, but the issue became irrelevant once he was included in a general exemption for film work. In 1941–1942 he returned to the stage to appear in Jupiter Laughs by A. J. Cronin. He established himself as a leading man in Britain in The Patient Vanishes (1941) Hatter's Castle (1941) with Robert Newton and Deborah Kerr, The Night Has Eyes (1941) Alibi (1942) with Margaret Lockwood, Secret Mission (1942) Thunder Rock (1942) with Michael Redgrave and The Bells Go Down (1943) with Tommy Trinder.

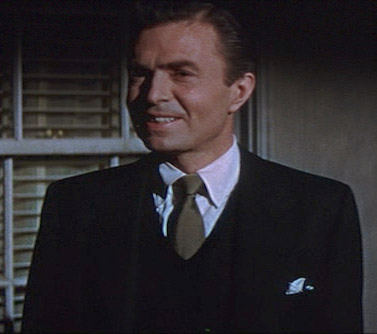
Mason as Norman Maine in A Star is Born (1954)

Mason became hugely popular for his brooding anti-heroes and occasional outright villains in the Gainsborough series of melodramas of the 1940s, starting with The Man in Grey (1943). The film was a huge hit and made him and co-stars Lockwood, Stewart Granger and Phyllis Calvert top-level stars. Mason starred in two wartime dramas, They Met in the Dark (1943) and Candlelight in Algeria (1944), then returned to Gainsborough melodrama with Fanny By Gaslight (1944) with Granger and Calvert; it was another big hit. He starred in Hotel Reserve (1944) a thriller, then did a ghost story for Gainsborough with Lockwood, A Place of One's Own (1945). Far more popular was a melodrama, They Were Sisters (1945).

Sydney Box cast Mason in a psychodrama about musicians, The Seventh Veil (1945) as the tyrannical guardian of pianist Ann Todd. It was a huge success in Britain and the US, and demand for Mason was at a fever pitch. Exhibitors voted him the most popular star in Britain in each year between 1944 and 1947. They also declared him the most popular international star in 1946; he dropped to second place the following year. He was the most popular male star in Canada in 1948.

Mason had a relatively minor role in The Wicked Lady (1945) with Lockwood, a big hit. He then received his best reviews to date playing a mortally wounded Irish Republican Army (IRA) bank robber on the run in Carol Reed's Odd Man Out (1947). He turned producer with Sydney Box on The Upturned Glass (1947) which starred Mason with a script by Mason's wife. It was not particularly successful. Neither was Bathsheba, a play the Masons did on Broadway. Mason went to Hollywood for his first film, Caught (1949) directed by Max Ophüls, then played Gustave Flaubert in MGM's Madame Bovary (1949). He did another with Ophüls, The Reckless Moment (1949) and followed it with East Side, West Side (1949) with Barbara Stanwyck at MGM and One Way Street (1950) at Universal. He made Pandora and the Flying Dutchman (1951) with Ava Gardner. None of these films was particularly successful.

=== Films at 20th Century Fox ===
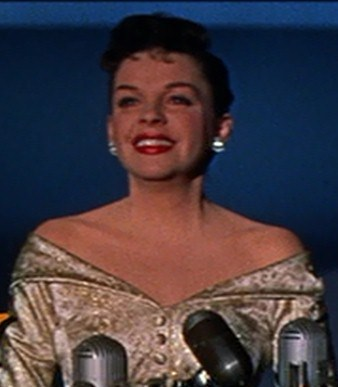
Mason acted alongside Judy Garland in A Star is Born (1954)

Mason's Hollywood career was revived when he was cast as General Rommel in The Desert Fox: The Story of Rommel (1951) directed by Henry Hathaway. To do the film he agreed to sign a contract with 20th Century Fox for seven years at one film a year. Mason did a film at Republic Pictures written by his wife and directed by Roy Kellino, Lady Possessed (1951). At Fox, he played a spy in 5 Fingers (1951) directed by Joseph L. Mankiewicz. MGM hired him to play Rupert of Hentzau in The Prisoner of Zenda (1952) opposite Granger. He was in the lower budgeted Face to Face (1952) then went to Paramount to play a villainous sea captain opposite Alan Ladd in Botany Bay (1953).

Mason was one of many stars in MGM's The Story of Three Loves (1953). At Fox, he reprised his role as Rommel in The Desert Rats (1953), then he was reunited with Mankiewicz at MGM, playing Brutus in Julius Caesar (1953) opposite Marlon Brando. The film was very successful. Mason worked with Carol Reed in The Man Between (1953) then Fox used him as a villain again in Prince Valiant (1954). Mason did another film with a screenplay by his wife and directed by Roy Kellino, Charade (1954).

Warner Bros. Pictures hired him to play fading screen actor and Judy Garland's leading man Norman Maine in the George Cukor-directed musical drama film A Star Is Born (1954). He took the role after Cary Grant turned it down. Mason won the Golden Globe Award for Best Actor – Motion Picture Musical or Comedy and was nominated for the Academy Award for Best Actor. Jack Moffitt of The Hollywood Reporter praised the film writing, "A Star Is Born is the perfect blend of drama and musical—of cinematic art and popular entertainment."

He went over to Disney to play Captain Nemo in 20,000 Leagues Under the Sea (1954) a huge hit which also starred Kirk Douglas, Paul Lukas and Peter Lorre. During 1954 and 1955, Mason was the host of several episodes of Lux Video Theatre on CBS television. Mason appeared with Lucille Ball and Desi Arnaz in the fantasy romantic comedy Forever, Darling (1956) and then starred in and produced a film at Fox, Bigger Than Life (1956) directed by Nicholas Ray. Mason played a small-town school teacher driven insane by the effects of cortisone. He did another for Fox, the hugely popular melodrama Island in the Sun (1957).

=== 1958–1970: Established actor ===
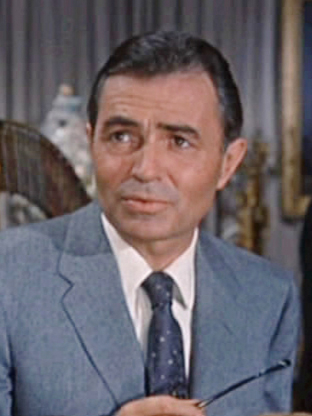
Mason in Hitchcock's North by Northwest (1959)

Mason began appearing regularly on television in shows such as Panic!, General Electric Theater, Schlitz Playhouse, Goodyear Theatre and Playhouse 90 (several episodes including John Brown's Raid). He starred in two thrillers for Andrew L. Stone, Cry Terror! (1958) and The Decks Ran Red (1958), then played a suave master spy hunting down Cary Grant with romantic assistance from Eva Marie Saint in North by Northwest (1959), directed by Alfred Hitchcock.

In 1959, he had a huge hit returning to Jules Verne as the determined Scottish scientist and explorer Sir Oliver Lindenbrook in Journey to the Centre of the Earth, taking over the role meant for Clifton Webb. He did a comedy, A Touch of Larceny (1960), and portrayed Sir Edward Carson in The Trials of Oscar Wilde (1960). He continued to appear on TV shows like The DuPont Show with June Allyson, Golden Showcase, Theatre '62 and The Alfred Hitchcock Hour.

He played a happily-married college professor asked to father a child by a Swedish visitor in The Marriage-Go-Round (1961) then played Lolita's sexually obsessive stepfather Humbert Humbert in Stanley Kubrick's Lolita (1962) receiving BAFTA and Golden Globe nominations. He starred in Tiara Tahiti (1962) and Hero's Island (1962) that he also produced. He starred as an Italian submarine captain in Torpedo Bay (1963).

In 1963, Mason settled in Switzerland and embarked on a transatlantic career. He began to drift into supporting roles: Timonides in the epic The Fall of the Roman Empire (1964), a cuckold in The Pumpkin Eater (1964) with Anne Bancroft, a river pirate who betrays Peter O'Toole's character in Lord Jim (1965) a Chinese noble in Genghis Khan (1965) a man in a love triangle in The Uninhibited (1965) a guest role on Dr. Kildare and an older employer pursuing his employee's virginal young daughter in the Swinging London-set Georgy Girl (1966) a role that earned him a second Academy Award nomination (Best Supporting Actor).

In 1967, Mason narrated the documentary The London Nobody Knows. An ardent cinephile on top of his career interests, Mason narrated two British documentary series supervised by Kevin Brownlow: Hollywood (1980) on the silent cinema and Unknown Chaplin (1983) devoted to out-take material from the films of Chaplin. Mason had been a long-time neighbor and friend of the actor and director Charlie Chaplin. In the late 1970s, Mason became a mentor to up-and-coming actor Sam Neill.

He was in several episodes of ITV Play of the Week and he had the lead in The Deadly Affair (1967) for Sidney Lumet (playing a character based on George Smiley, though it was renamed) and Stranger in the House (1968). He provided a supporting role in Duffy (1968) The Blue Max (1966) and Mayerling (1968) but was top billed in The Sea Gull (1968) for Sidney Lumet and starred as Bradley Morahan in Age of Consent (1969) for Michael Powell, a film which Mason also produced. The movie featured Helen Mirren's first big film role and was Powell's last significant film. It was also through this film that Mason met his second wife, Clarissa Kaye. Mason also had the star role in Spring and Port Wine (1970).

=== 1970–1985: Later roles ===
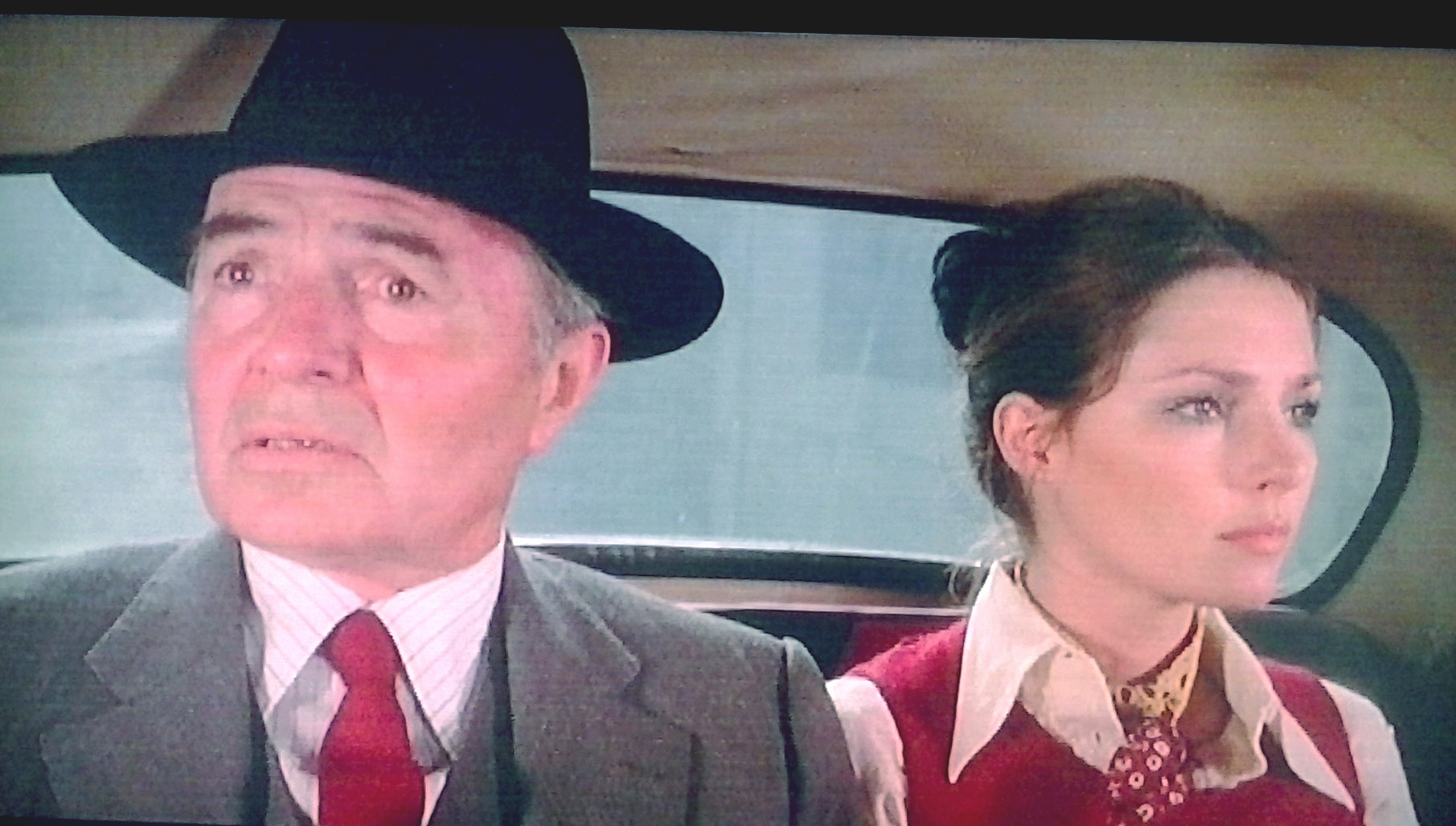
Mason in 1975's The Flower in His Mouth

Mason supported Charles Bronson in Cold Sweat (1970) and Lee Van Cleef in Bad Man's River (1971). He had a supporting role in Kill! Kill! Kill! Kill! (1971) and top billed in Child's Play (1972) for Lumet, replacing Marlon Brando. He was one of many stars in The Last of Sheila (1973) and played the evil Doctor Polidori in Frankenstein: The True Story (1973). He had supporting roles in The MacKintosh Man (1973) 11 Harrowhouse (1974) The Marseille Contract (1974) and Great Expectations (1974) he was top billed in Mandingo (1975).

Mason's later 70s performances included Kidnap Syndicate (1975) The Left Hand of the Law (1975) Autobiography of a Princess (1975) Inside Out (1975) The Flower in His Mouth (1975) Voyage of the Damned (1976) Hot Stuff (1977) Cross of Iron (1977) Jesus of Nazareth (1977) The Yin and the Yang of Mr. Go (1978) The Water Babies (1978) Heaven Can Wait (1978) The Boys from Brazil (1978) Murder by Decree (1979) as Dr. Watson, The Passage (1979) Bloodline (1979) and as the vampire's servant, Richard Straker, in Salem's Lot (1979).

Mason was in North Sea Hijack (1980) supporting Roger Moore, Evil Under the Sun (1982) Ivanhoe (1982) and A Dangerous Summer (1982). One of his last roles, that of the corrupt lawyer Ed Concannon in The Verdict (1982) opposite Paul Newman, earned him his third and final Oscar nomination. He had parts in Yellowbeard (1983) Alexandre (1983) and George Washington (1984).

Having completed playing the lead role in Dr. Fischer of Geneva (1985) adapted from Graham Greene's eponymous novella for the BBC, he stepped into the role in The Shooting Party originally meant for Paul Scofield, who was unable to continue after being seriously injured in an accident on the first day of shooting. This was to be Mason's final screen performance in a feature film. He did appear on television in A.D. (1985) and The Assisi Underground (1985).

== Personal life ==
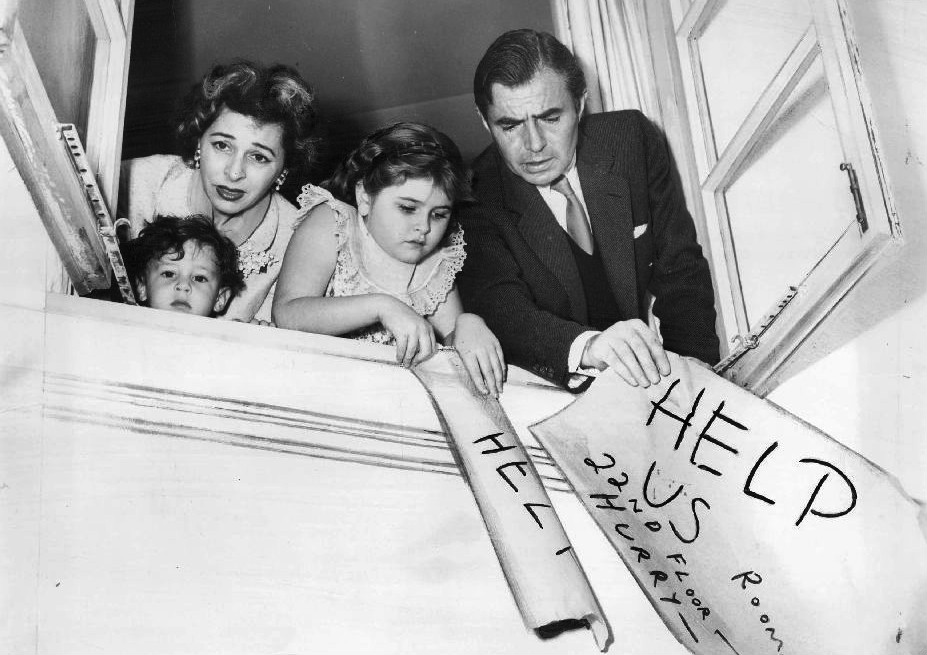
Mason and his family in 1957 in the television programme Panic!. From left: son Morgan, Mason's wife Pamela, daughter Portland and Mason.

Mason was a devoted lover of animals, particularly cats. He and his wife, Pamela Mason, co-authored the book The Cats in Our Lives, which was published in 1949. James wrote most of the book and also illustrated it. In The Cats in Our Lives, he recounted humorous and sometimes touching tales of the cats (as well as a few dogs) he had known and loved.

In 1952, Mason purchased a house previously owned by Buster Keaton. There he discovered reels of nitrate film of some of Keaton's work that was considered lost, including The Boat (1921). He arranged to have the decomposing films transferred to safety stock, saving them from oblivion.

In his youth, Mason was a keen fan of his local Rugby League team, Huddersfield. In later years, he also followed the fortunes of Huddersfield Town.

Mason was married twice:

- From 1941 to 1964 to British actress Pamela Mason (née Ostrer) (1916–1996). They had one daughter, Portland Mason Schuyler (1948–2004) and one son, Morgan (who is married to Belinda Carlisle, lead singer of the Go-Go's). Pamela Mason filed suit for divorce in 1962 for lack of support, claiming adultery on his part with three Jane Does. According to their son Morgan and other sources, Pamela had had numerous affairs, but due to her attorney Marvin Mitchelson's skill, she won a monetary settlement of at least $1 million ($9.275 million today) when the marriage was dissolved in 1964; it was reported as "America's first million-dollar divorce". As a result of this success, Mitchelson became a sought-after celebrity divorce attorney.
- Australian actress Clarissa Kaye (1971 – his death). Tobe Hooper's DVD commentary for Salem's Lot reveals that Mason regularly included contractual clauses in his later work guaranteeing Kaye bit parts in his films. Mason's autobiography, Before I Forget, was published in 1981.

== Death ==
Mason survived a severe heart attack in 1959. He died as result of another heart attack on 27 July 1984 in Lausanne, Switzerland and was cremated. Mason left his estate to his second wife, Clarissa Kaye, but his will was challenged by his two children. The lawsuit had not been settled when she died on 21 July 1994 from cancer.

Clarissa Kaye Mason left her holdings to the religious guru Sathya Sai Baba, including the actor's ashes, which she had retained in their shared home. Mason's children sued Sai Baba and had Mason's ashes interred in Corsier-sur-Vevey, Vaud, Switzerland. The remains of Mason's friend, Charlie Chaplin, are in a tomb a few steps away. Mason's children specified that his headstone read: "Never say in grief you are sorry he's gone. Rather, say in thankfulness you are grateful he was here", words that were spoken to Portland Mason by U.S. Senator Ted Kennedy after the actor's death.

== Filmography ==
=== Film ===
Year	Title	Role	Notes
1935	Late Extra	Jim Martin	
1936	Twice Branded	Henry Hamilton	
1936	Prison Breaker	'Bunny' Barnes	
1936	Troubled Waters	John Merriman	
1936	Blind Man's Bluff	Stephen Neville	
1936	The Secret of Stamboul	Larry	
1936	The Mill on the Floss	Tom Tulliver	
1937	Fire Over England	Hillary Vane	
1937	The High Command	Capt. Heverell	
1937	Catch As Catch Can	Robert Leyland	
1937	The Return of the Scarlet Pimpernel	Jean Tallien	
1939	I Met a Murderer	Mark Warrow	
1941	This Man Is Dangerous	Mick Cardby	aka The Patient Vanishes
1942	Hatter's Castle	Dr Renwick	
1942	The Night Has Eyes	Stephen Deremid	aka Terror House
1942	Alibi	Andre Laurent	
1942	Secret Mission	Raoul de Carnot	
1942	Thunder Rock	Streeter	
1943	The Bells Go Down	Ted Robbins	
1943	The Man in Grey	Lord Rohan	
1943	They Met in the Dark	Richard Francis Heritage	
1944	Candlelight in Algeria	Alan Thurston	
1944	Fanny by Gaslight	Lord Manderstoke	aka Man of Evil
1944	Hotel Reserve	Peter Vadassy	
1945	A Place of One's Own	Smedhurst	
1945	They Were Sisters	Geoffrey Lee	
1945	The Seventh Veil	Nicholas	
1945	The Wicked Lady	Capt. Jerry Jackson	
1947	Odd Man Out	Johnny McQueen	
1947	The Upturned Glass	Michael Joyce	
1949	Caught	Larry Quinada	
1949	Madame Bovary	Gustave Flaubert	
1949	The Reckless Moment	Martin Donnelly	
1949	East Side, West Side	Brandon Bourne	
1950	One Way Street	Frank Matson	
1951	Pandora and the Flying Dutchman	Hendrik van der Zee	
1951	The Desert Fox	Field Marshal Erwin Rommel	
1952	Lady Possessed	Jimmy del Palma	Also producer and writer
1952	5 Fingers	Ulysses Diello	
1952	Face to Face	The Captain ('The Secret Sharer')	
1952	The Prisoner of Zenda	Rupert of Hentzau	
1952	Botany Bay	Capt. Paul Gilbert	
1953	The Story of Three Loves	Charles Coutray	Segment: "The Jealous Lover"
1953	The Desert Rats	Field Marshal Erwin Rommel	
1953	Julius Caesar	Brutus	
1953	The Man Between	Ivo Kern	
1953	The Tell-Tale Heart	Narrator	Voice; Animated short subject
1954	Prince Valiant	Sir Brack	
1954	Charade	The Murderer / Maj. Linden / Jonah Watson	Also producer and writer
1954	A Star Is Born	Norman Maine	
1954	20,000 Leagues Under the Sea	Captain Nemo	
1956	Forever, Darling	The Guardian Angel	
1956	Bigger Than Life	Ed Avery	Also producer and writer
1957	Island in the Sun	Maxwell Fleury	
1958	Cry Terror!	Jim Molner	
1958	The Decks Ran Red	Capt. Edwin Rummill	
1959	North by Northwest	Phillip Vandamm	
1959	A Touch of Larceny	Cmdr. Max Easton	
1959	Journey to the Center of the Earth	Sir Oliver S. Lindenbrook	
1960	The Trials of Oscar Wilde	Sir Edward Carson	
1961	The Marriage-Go-Round	Paul Delville	
1962	Escape from Zahrain	Johnson	Uncredited
1962	Lolita	Prof. Humbert Humbert	
1962	Tiara Tahiti	Capt. Brett Aimsley	
1962	Hero's Island	Jacob Weber	
1963	Torpedo Bay	Captain Blayne	
1964	The Fall of the Roman Empire	Timonides	
1964	The Pumpkin Eater	Bob Conway	
1965	Lord Jim	Gentleman Brown	
1965	Genghis Khan	Kam Ling	
1965	The Uninhibited	Pascal Regnier	
1966	Georgy Girl	James Leamington	
1966	The Blue Max	General Count von Klugermann	
1966	Dare I Weep, Dare I Mourn	Otto Hoffman	
1967	The Deadly Affair	Charles Dobbs	
1967	The London Nobody Knows	Narrator	Documentary
1967	Stranger in the House	John Sawyer	(also known as Cop Out)
1968	Duffy	Charles Calvert	
1968	Mayerling	Emperor Franz-Joseph	
1968	The Sea Gull	Trigorin, a writer	
1969	Age of Consent	Bradley Morahan	
1970	Spring and Port Wine	Rafe Crompton	
1970	Cold Sweat	Captain Ross	
1970	The Yin and the Yang of Mr. Go	Y.Y. Go	
1971	Bad Man's River	Francisco Paco Montero	
1971	Kill! Kill! Kill! Kill!	Alan Hamilton	
1972	Child's Play	Jerome Mailey	
1973	John Keats: His Life and Death	Narrator (voice)	
1973	The Last of Sheila	Phillip	
1973	The Mackintosh Man	Sir George Wheeler	
1974	11 Harrowhouse	Charles D. Watts	
1974	Great Expectations	Abel Magwitch	
1974	The Marseille Contract	Jacques Brizard	Released as The Destructors
1975	The Year of the Wildebeest	Narrator	Documentary
1975	Mandingo	Warren Maxwell	
1975	Kidnap Syndicate	Fillippini	
1975	The Left Hand of the Law	Senator Leandri	
1975	Autobiography of a Princess	Cyril Sahib	
1975	Inside Out	Ernst Furben	
1975	The Flower in His Mouth	Bellocampo	
1976	People of the Wind	Narrator	Documentary
1976	Voyage of the Damned	Juan Ramos	
1976	Fear in the City	Prosecutor	
1977	Cross of Iron	Oberst Brandt	
1977	Homage to Chagall: The Colours of Love	Narrator	Documentary
1978	The Water Babies	Mr Grimes; Voice of Killer Shark	
1978	Heaven Can Wait	Mr Jordan	
1978	The Boys from Brazil	Eduard Seibert	
1979	Murder by Decree	John H. Watson	
1979	The Passage	Prof. John Bergson	
1979	Bloodline	Sir Alec Nichols	
1980	North Sea Hijack	Admiral Brinsden	
1982	Evil Under the Sun	Odell Gardener	
1982	A Dangerous Summer	George Engels	
1982	The Verdict	Ed Concannon	
1982	Socrates	Socrates	
1983	Yellowbeard	Captain Hughes	
1983	Alexandre	The Father	
1984	Dr. Fischer of Geneva	Dr Fischer	
1985	The Shooting Party	Sir Randolph Nettleby	Posthumous release
1985	The Assisi Underground	Bishop Nicolini	Final film role; posthumous release

=== Television ===
Year	Title	Role	Notes
1956	G.E. Summer Originals		Season 1 Episode 2: "Duel at Dawn"
1962	The Alfred Hitchcock Hour	Warren Barrow	Season 1 Episode 5: "Captive Audience"
1973	Frankenstein: The True Story	Dr. John Polidori	TV miniseries
1976	Origins of the Mafia	Vianisi	TV miniseries
1977	Jesus of Nazareth	Joseph of Arimathea	TV miniseries
1979	Salem's Lot	Richard K. Straker	TV miniseries
1980	Hollywood	Narrator	TV documentary miniseries
1982	Ivanhoe	Isaac of York	TV film
1983	Don't Eat the Pictures	Demon	TV special
1984	George Washington	Edward Braddock	TV miniseries
1985	A.D.	Tiberius	TV miniseries; posthumous release

=== Theatre ===
Year	Title	Role	Notes
1933	Henry VIII	Cromwell	The Old Vic, London
1933	Measure for Measure	Claudio	The Old Vic, London
1933-34	The Cherry Orchard	Yasha	The Old Vic, London
1934	The Tempest	Francisco	The Old Vic, London
1934	The Importance of Being Earnest	Merriman	The Old Vic, London
1934	Macbeth	Lennox	The Old Vic, London
1947	Bathsheba	David	Ethel Barrymore Theatre, Broadway
1979	Faith Healer	Frank Hardy	Longacre Theatre, Broadway

=== Radio ===
Year	Programme	Episode/source
1950	Suspense	Banquo's Chair
1952	Suspense	Odd Man Out
1953	Suspense	The Queen's Ring

Mason also made numerous sound recordings, including adaptations of Lolita, Frankenstein, The Metamorphosis and The Third Man; poetry by Browning, A. E. Houseman, Swinburne and Wilde; excerpts from Ecclesiastes, and an adaptation of The Pilgrim's Progress.

== Awards and nominations ==
Year	Award	Category	Work	Result	Ref
1954	Academy Awards	Best Actor	A Star is Born	Nominated	
1966	Academy Awards	Best Supporting Actor	Georgy Girl	Nominated	
1982	Academy Awards	Best Supporting Actor	The Verdict	Nominated	
1962	British Academy Film Awards	Best British Actor	Lolita	Nominated	
1967	British Academy Film Awards	Best British Actor	The Deadly Affair	Nominated	
1954	Golden Globe Awards	Best Actor - Motion Picture Musical or Comedy	A Star is Born	Won	
1962	Golden Globe Awards	Best Actor - Motion Picture Drama	Lolita	Nominated	
1982	Golden Globe Awards	Best Supporting Actor - Motion Picture	The Verdict	Nominated	
1982	Los Angeles Film Critics Association	Best Supporting Actor	The Verdict	Nominated	
1954	New York Film Critics Circle	Best Actor	A Star is Born	Nominated	
1957	New York Film Critics Circle	Best Actor	Child's Play	Nominated	
1953	National Board of Review	Best Actor	Face to Face / Julius Caesar; The Desert Rats / The Man Between	Won	
