= Roy Kellino =

English film director, producer, and cinematographer (1912–1956)

- Born: Philip Roy Gislingham; 22 April 1912; Lambeth, England
- Died: 18 November 1956 (aged 44); Los Angeles, California, US
- Occupations: Film director, producer, cinematographer
- Spouses: Pamela Kellino (m. 1932; div. 1940) Barbara Billingsley (m. 1953)

Roy Kellino (born Philip Roy Gislingham; 22 April 1912 – 18 November 1956) was an English film director, producer and cinematographer.

== Biography ==
He was born Philip Roy Gislingham in Lambeth, south London, the son of the silent-era director W.P. Kellino. He directed his first film Concerning Mr. Martin in 1937. He worked primarily in the years during the Second World War, venturing into television in the 1950s, directing many episodes of the anthology series Four Star Playhouse, along with episodes of other anthologies like The Star and the Story.

Kellino was married to actress Pamela Kellino from 1932 to 1940. She then married actor James Mason and took his last name. Meanwhile, Kellino married Leave It to Beaver actress Barbara Billingsley. Their marriage lasted 3 years until his death from a heart attack in 1956 in Los Angeles, California, at the age of 44.

== Selected filmography ==
Director

- Concerning Mr. Martin (1937)
- The Last Adventurers (1937)
- Father O'Nine (1938)
- I Met a Murderer (1939)
- Guilt Is My Shadow (1950)
- Lady Possessed (1952)
- Charade (1953)
- The Silken Affair (1956)

Cinematographer

- Foreign Affaires (1935)
- Wedding Group (1936)
- Pot Luck (1936)
- Rhythm in the Air (1936)
- Aren't Men Beasts! (1937)
- Calling All Ma's (1937)
- Kate Plus Ten (1938)
- Convoy (1940)
- Nine Men (1943)
- Johnny Frenchman (1945)

Actor

- Rob Roy (1922)
- The Further Adventures of the Flag Lieutenant (1927)
