= George Gerbner =

Hungarian-born American academic

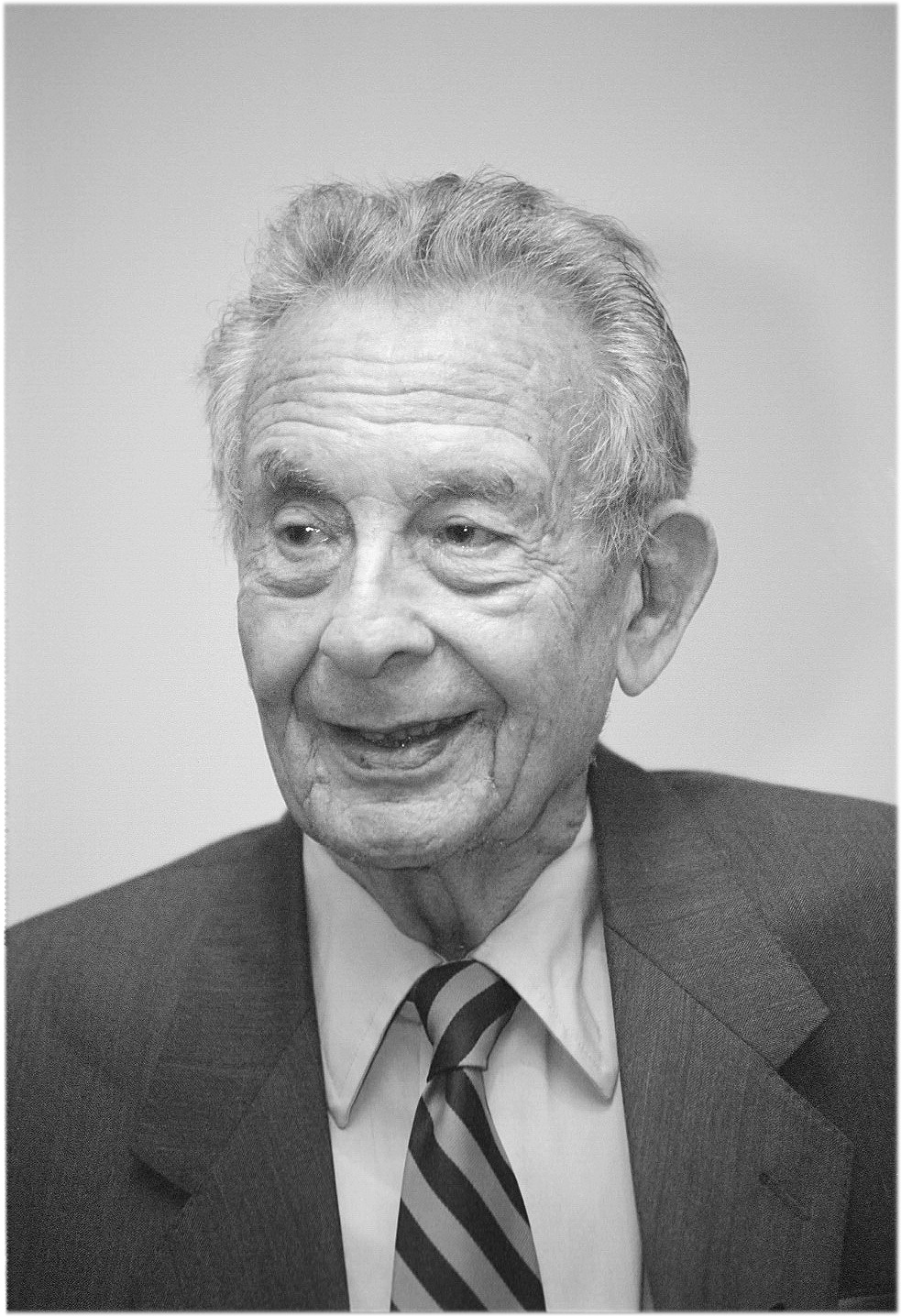
- Born: August 8, 1919; Budapest, Hungary
- Died: December 24, 2005 (aged 86); Philadelphia, Pennsylvania, U.S.
- Spouse: Ilona Kutas (married 1946)
- Children: 2

George Gerbner (August 8, 1919 – December 24, 2005) was a professor of communication and the founder of cultivation theory. He taught at Temple University, Villanova University, and the University of Pennsylvania.

== Personal life ==
=== Early life and education ===
Gerbner was born on August 8, 1919, in Budapest, Hungary.

After winning first prize in Hungarian literature in a national competition of high-school students, he enrolled at the University of Budapest, where he graduated with a degree in literature and anthropology (1937–1938).

Being of Jewish descent, he fled to Paris in 1939 (after Kristallnacht) to avoid conscription into the Hungarian army, which was under a government allied with Nazi Germany. Initially, Gerbner was unable to obtain a visa to enter the United States, where his half-brother László Benedek was a Hollywood filmmaker, instead having to travel first to Mexico, then Cuba. He was finally permitted to sail from Havana to New Orleans, where he was received by Benedek's friends.

Gerbner hitchhiked from New Orleans to California and enrolled at the University of California, Los Angeles, where he received a degree in psychology and sociology (1940–1941). He transferred to UC Berkeley to study journalism, where he received his bachelor's degree in journalism in 1942. Upon graduating, he worked briefly for the San Francisco Chronicle as copy boy, reporter, copy editor, feature writer, daily columnist, and assistant financial editor.

=== Military service ===
Gerbner became a U.S. citizen in 1943.

As American enlistment regulations loosened the year prior, Gerbner joined the US Army in 1943. (He was officially recognized as an “enemy alien” due to Hungary's declaration of war on the US.) In the army, he would be trained as a paratrooper in Fort Benning, Georgia. Later, he would be transferred to the Office of Strategic Services and eventually arrived in Italy, where he joined the OSS' Secret Intelligence Branch. After Germany's defeat in the war Gerbner was sent to Austria in October 1945 to investigate a mass encampment of Hungarian soldiers, among which was the pro-Nazi prime minister of Hungary, Döme Sztójay, whom Gerbner helped arrest and return to Budapest to be tried and executed as a war criminal.

While stationed in Budapest, Gerbner met Ilona Kutas, an actress, whom he married in 1946 and had two children with.

Gerbner received the Bronze Star for his service behind enemy lines and was honorably discharged as a First Lieutenant.

=== Graduate studies and political activity ===
After World War II, Gerbner worked as a freelance writer and publicist. Searching for employment upon his return to Los Angeles, he volunteered as a newspaper editor for the Independent Progressive Party and the Progressive Citizens of America in 1947. Because of his association with PCA and IPP, as well as other leftist activities during the height of America's anti-communist McCarthy Era, Gerbner caught the interest of California's House Un-American Activities Committee (HUAC). He would be called to testify before HUAC, who cited PCA as being a "communist created and controlled organization."

Shortly after, Gerbner was hired to teach journalism at John Muir College (now Pasadena City College), where he remained from 1948 to 1951. He would then go on to conduct research at the University of Southern California's (USC) Department of Cinema (1951–52), while earning a master's (1951) and doctorate (1955) in communication & education at USC. His dissertation, "Toward a General Theory of Communication" won USC's award for "best dissertation." He then became a professor and researcher at USC's School of Education (1954–56).

Along with his freelance work, Gerbner taught journalism at El Camino College (1952–56). Through the years, he taught at Temple University, Villanova University, and spent the major part of his career at the University of Pennsylvania's Annenberg School of Communication.

=== Later life and death ===
Gerbner was diagnosed with cancer in late November, 2005, and died on December 24, 2005, at his apartment in Center City, Philadelphia. He had a total of two children and, as of 2001, five grandchildren.

Between 2010 and 2014, a conference on communication, conflict, and aggression was held periodically in Budapest in honor of the late Dr. Gerbner. The conference was co-organized by Dr. Jolán Róka of Budapest Metropolitan University and Dr. Rebecca M. Chory, currently of Frostburg State University.

== Career and work ==
In 1956, he became a faculty member at the University of Illinois, Urbana–Champaign's Institute of Communication Research (1956–64), where he had been recruited by Dallas Smythe, who met Gerbner as a visiting professor in USC's Department of Cinema. Gerbner remained at Illinois for the next eight years.

In 1964, Gerbner would become Dean of the Annenberg School for Communication at the University of Pennsylvania (1964–89)—only five years after it was established at the university—and presided over the school's growth and influence in communication theory in academia. Gerbner served as editor and executive editor of the School's Journal of Communication, which was the leading publication in the field. Moreover, Gerbner also created the first world encyclopedia of communications—as the chair of the editorial board of the International Encyclopedia of Communication—and established The Washington Program, a communications project that brought communication researchers and practitioners together in the U.S. Capitol. In 1968, Gerbner established and headed the Cultural Indicators Project (CIP) to document trends in television programming and how these changes affect viewers' perceptions of society.

In 1986, he was named chair of the Commission on the Social Sciences of the American Council of Learned Societies' (ACLS) Subcommission on Communications and Society.

Gerbner would retire from the deanship at Annenberg in 1989 after 25 years, becoming the U of Pennsylvania's longest-serving dean. He continued to conduct research and teach undergraduate and graduate courses in analysis of mass media.

In 1991, he founded the Cultural Environmental Movement (CEM), a media advocacy group promoting greater diversity in communication media. In 1997, he became the Bell Atlantic Professor of Telecommunication at Temple University, where he continued to teach, research, and advocate through CEM.

=== Theoretical work ===
I came to the conclusion that communication is really where the action is—the political action, the social action, the cultural action.

— George Gerbner (August 19, 1992)

In 1968, Gerbner established and headed the Cultural Indicators Project (CIP) to document trends in television programming and how these changes affect viewers' perceptions of society. The project—as Gerbner's most famous and influential contribution to the field of journalism—held a database of over 3,000 television programs and 35,000 characters. For the CIP, he coined the phrase mean world syndrome to describe the fact that people who watch large amounts of television are more likely to perceive the world as a dangerous and frightening place.

Gerbner testified before a Congressional Subcommittee on Communications in 1981, saying that:

The most general and prevalent association with television viewing is a heightened sense of living in a 'mean world' of violence and danger. Fearful people are more dependent, more easily manipulated and controlled, more susceptible to deceptively simple, strong, tough measures and hard-line postures.... They may accept and even welcome repression if it promises to relieve their insecurities. That is the deeper problem of violence-laden television.

In a 1987 article titled "Science on Television: How It Affects Public Conceptions", Gerbner touched on the fact that prime time television has an abundance of professionals being portrayed. Of all of the professionals, scientists seemed to be portrayed in a slightly more negative light. Scientists tended to be portrayed as “smarter and stronger than other professionals;" while these may not be bad things, they tend to be unbecoming characteristics that could shed a negative light on the entire profession. Although Gerbner does mention that TV did not invent the negative perception of science, it does marginalize the field.

=== Honours ===
Date	Award / honour	Presented by
1946/7	Bronze Star	United States Army
1970	Plaque	Richard Thiers, on behalf of the Public Relations Society of America, Philadelphia Chapter
1976	34-volume collected works of Winston Churchill	Grace Hamblin on behalf of Walter H. Annenberg, the U.S. Ambassador to England.
1979	became an ICA Fellow	International Communication Association
1988	An annual lecture series is named after him (George Gerbner Lecture in Communications)	former president Sheldon Hackney and former provost Michael Aiken of the U of Pennsylvania
1991	Wayne A. Danielson Award for Distinguished Contribution to Communication Scholarship	University of Texas at Austin College of Communication
1996 Aug	Paul J. Deutschman Award	AEJMC, headed by Oscar Gandy Jr.
1982	Preceptor Award	The Television, Radio and Advertising Club of Philadelphia (TRAC)

== Selected publications ==
=== Articles and essays ===
- 1976. "Living with Television: The Violence Profile," with Larry Gross. Journal of Communication 26(2):172–99. doi:10.1111/j.1460-2466.1976.tb01397.x
- 1985. "Mass Media Discourse: Message System Analysis as a Component of Cultural Indicators." Pp. 13–25 in Discourse and Communication, edited by T. A. van Dijk. New York: Walter de Gruyter Berlin.
- 1985. "Children's Television: A National Disgrace." Pediatric Annals 14(12):822–23 and 826–27.
- 1986. “Living with Television: The Dynamics of the Cultivation Process,” with Michael Morgan and Nancy Signorielli. Pp. 17–40 in Perspectives on Media Effects, edited by J. Bryant and D. Zillmann. Hillsdale, NJ: Lawrence Erlbaum Associates. S2CID 53682668 (2007).
- 1986. "The Symbolic Context of Action and Communication." Pp. 251–68 in Contextualism and Understanding in Behavioral Science, edited by R. L. Rosnow and M. Georgoudi. New York: Praeger Publisher.
- 1987. "Research on Violence and Terrorism in the Mass Media: An Annotated Bibliography," with Nancy Signorielli. pg. 1–163.
- Gerbner, George (1987). "Television's Populist Brew: The Three Bs". Et Cetera. 44 (1): 3–7. Archived from the original on January 10, 2021.
- 1988. "Telling Stories in the Information Age." Pp. 3–12 in Information and Behavior, edited by B. D. Ruben. New Brunswick, NJ: Transaction Books.
- 1988. "Continuity and Change: Cross Cultural Communications Research in the Age of Telecommunications." Pp. 220–31 in The World Community in Post-Industrial Society 2, edited by C. Academy. Seol: Wooseok Publishing Co.
- 1991. "The Image of Russians in American Media and The 'New Epoch'." Pp. 31–35 in Beyond the Cold War: Soviet and American Media Images, edited by E. E. Dennis, G. Gerbner, and Y. N. Zassoursky. Newbury Park: SAGE Publications.
- 1994. "Growing Up with Television: The Cultivation Perspective, with Larry Gross, Michael Morgan, and Nancy Signorielli." Pp. 17–41 in Media Effects: Advances in Theory and Research, edited by J. Bryant and D. Zillmann. Hillsdale, NJ: Lawrence Erlbaum Associates.

=== Books ===
- 1988. Violence and Terror in the Mass Media: An Annotated Bibliography, with Nancy Signorelli. New York: Greenwood Press. Preview.
- 1989. The Information Gap: How Computers and Other New Communication Technologies Affect the Social Distribution of Power, with Marsha Siefert and Janice Fisher. Oxford University Press.
- 1991. Beyond the Cold War: Soviet and American Media Images, with Everette E. Dennis and Yassen N. Zassoursky. Newbury Park: SAGE Publications.
- 1992. Triumph of the Image: The Media's War in the Persian Gulf, A Global Perspective, with Hamid Mowlana and Herbert L. Schiller. Avalon Publishing. Preview.
- 1993. The Global Media Debate, with Mowlana and Kaarle Nordenstreng. Norwood, NJ: Ablex. Preview.
- 1996. Invisible Crises: What Conglomerate Control of Media Means for America and the World, with Mowlana and Schiller. New York: Routledge. Preview.
- 2002. Against the Mainstream: The Selected Works of George Gerbner, edited by Michael Morgan. New York: Peter Lang. Book review.

=== Testimonies ===
- 1950. On Gerbner's alleged association with communist groups— California Senate Investigating Committee on Education
- 1981. On research findings regarding violence and television — Subcommittee on Telecommunications, Consumer Protection, and Finance (House Committee on Energy and Commerce)
- 1992. On violence in television — Subcommittee on Crime and Criminal Justice (House Judiciary Committee)
- 1998. On violence in television — Senate Committee on Commerce, Science, and Transportation
- 1998–1999. As a trial expert — trial of Michael Carneal
- 1999–2000. As a trial expert — Pacitti vs. Macy
