= Seunga Venus Jin =

Social scientist

- Occupations: Associate Dean for Education, Director of Artificial Intelligence and Media Lab, Professor of Digital Media

Academic background
- Education: University of Southern California (MA, PhD)

Academic work
- Discipline: Communication studies
- Sub-discipline: Emerging technologies, AI-empowered digital transformation, Influencer marketing, Strategic communication, Personal branding, Integrated marketing communication
- Institutions: Northwestern University

Seunga Venus Jin (earlier writing as Seung-A Annie Jin) is a social scientist, data scientist, and academic administrator. She serves as Professor in Residence in the Communication Program at Northwestern University, Associate Dean for Education, and founding director of the Artificial Intelligence and Media (AIM) Lab.

== Education ==
Jin graduated Summa Cum Laude with a bachelor of arts degree from Yonsei University. She also received her master's and doctoral degrees from the Annenberg School for Communication and Journalism at the University of Southern California.

== Academic career ==
Jin has held faculty appointments at multiple institutions. She served as an Assistant Professor of Communication at Boston College, a tenured Associate Professor of Marketing Communication at Emerson College, and a tenured Associate Professor of Marketing at Sejong University Business School in South Korea.

At Northwestern, Jin has served as professor in residence in the Communication Program in NU-Q since 2019. She was director of the Communication Program from 2022 to 2023. Since 2024, she has been Associate Dean for Education and founding director of the Artificial Intelligence and Media Lab.

Jin's research is interdisciplinary, combining social science and data science approaches to study the impact of digital media, emerging technologies, artificial intelligence, and digital transformation on human behavior and decision making. She has published over 80 peer-reviewed journal articles, including in Journal of Communication, New Media & Society, Journal of Advertising, Journal of Broadcasting & Electronic Media, and Journal of Consumer Affairs.

Her work has addressed both theoretical and applied topics, including human-machine interaction, AI, virtual reality, marketing communication, and consumer psychology.

=== Industry experience ===
Jin has co-founded two technology startups and served as a marketing director and branding advisor for fintech and edtech startups.

== Award ==
Her 2022 article in Journal of Consumer Affairs, examining narcissism, altruism, and charitable giving during the COVID-19 pandemic, was nominated as a finalist for the JCA 2023 Best Article Award. She is a Fellow of the International Communication Association.
