= Marwan M. Kraidy =

Dean of Northwestern University in Qatar

Marwan M. Kraidy is the Dean & CEO of Northwestern University in Qatar, the Anthony Shadid Chair in Global Media, Politics and Cultures, and co-founder of its flagship research institute, the Institute for Advanced Study of the Global South (#IAS_NUQ).

He is a former professor of communication at the Annenberg School for Communication at the University of Pennsylvania, where he was the Founding Director of the Center for Advanced Research in Global Communication (CARGC).

Kraidy's focus is on the relationship between culture and geopolitics, global mass media systems and industries, and theories of modernity and identity.

Kraidy is also an Andrew Carnegie Fellow.

== Publications ==
=== Articles ===
- "Northwestern University in Qatar: A Distinctive Global University." Daedalus (2024).
