= Cultivation theory =

Theory examining long-term effects of TV

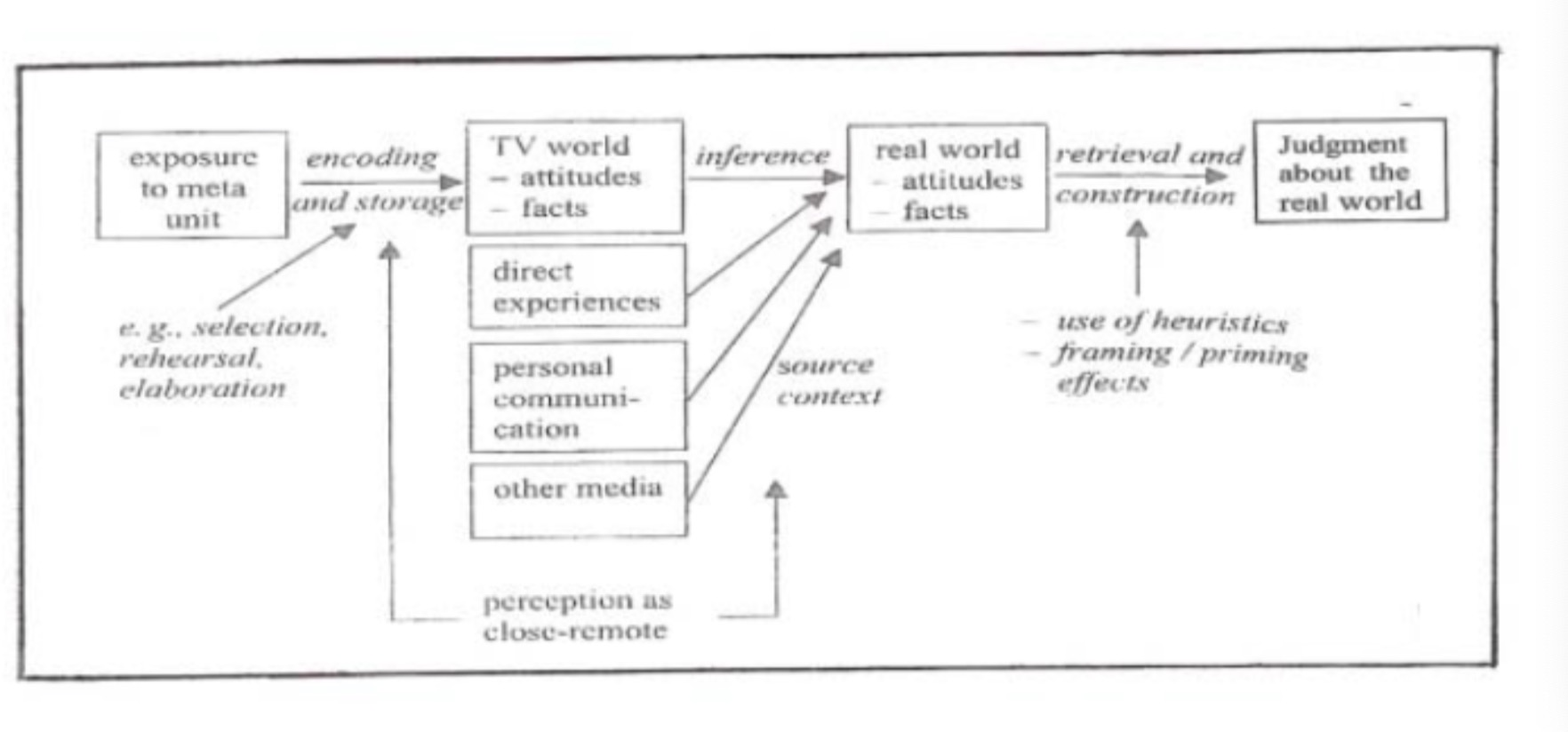
Diagram summarizing the process of cultivation theory from a psychological point of view.

Cultivation theory is a sociological and communications framework designed to unravel the enduring impacts of media consumption, with a primary focus on television. At its core, the theory posits that individuals who invest more time in watching television are prone to perceive the real world through a lens aligning with the prevalent depictions in television messages, in contrast to their counterparts with lower television viewership but comparable demographic profiles.

The premise hinges on the idea that increased exposure to television content, marked by recurring patterns of messages and images, cultivates shifts in individuals' perceptions. This transformative process extends beyond mere entertainment, playing a pivotal role in shaping the cultural fabric by reinforcing shared assumptions about the world. Cultivation theory, therefore, seeks to unravel the intricate dynamics of how prolonged engagement with television programming influences collective perspectives.

This theory believes that television has taken the role in which family, schools and churches formerly played in the society, which is the function of enculturation.

A notable validation of the theory's significance emerges from a comprehensive 2004 study conducted by Jennings Bryant and Dorina Miron. Their examination, encompassing nearly 2,000 articles published in the top three mass communication journals since 1956, revealed cultivation theory as the third most frequently employed cultural framework. This underscores the theory's enduring relevance and widespread adoption within the realm of mass communication scholarship.

== Origin and founders ==
Cultivation theory was founded by George Gerbner. It was developed to seek out the influence that television media may have on the viewers. Most of the formative research underlying cultivation theory was conducted by Gerbner along with his University of Pennsylvania colleague Larry Gross and their students-turned-colleagues Michael Morgan and Nancy Signorielli. Gerbner formulated his paradigm for mass communication in 1973 which included three types of analysis. The first type of analysis is message system analysis. Message system analysis aims to identify the content of message patterns in television and media. This includes the focus on gender, race, and ethnicity in relation to topics, such as violence. The second type of analysis is the cultivation analysis that is defined as the longitudinal surveys of people's opinions on certain subjects with the key variable being levels of media reception such as television viewing. Most of the research under cultivation theory involves cultivation analysis. The third type of analysis is institutional process analysis, which looks at what institutions are supporting and distributing the content in media. These three analyses are known as the cultivation theory.

Cultivation theory began as a way to test the impact of television on viewers, especially how exposure to violence through television affects human beings. The theory's key proposition is that "the more time people spend 'living' in the television world, the more likely they are to believe that social reality aligns with reality portrayed on television." Early studies of Cultivation Theory began with an interest in whether or not heavy television viewers were more likely to imitate violence that they saw. Current studies emphasize the conclusions that viewers draw about violence in the world around them. The traditional perspective of Cultivation Theory put emphasis on the overall viewing habits of individuals rather than their choice of genre. This was due to fewer choices that viewers had available to them. In light of changes in technology, simply examining the amount of viewing can be combined with choices in viewing. Gerbner believed that audience members used television to "fill the gaps" of their knowledge about certain experiences that have not occurred their own life experience. Because cultivation theory assumes the existence of objective reality and value-neutral research, it can be categorized as part of positivistic philosophy.

== Background ==
Together, Gerbner and Gross were able to expand upon the cultivation theory and base it upon different core assumptions.

Cultivation theory is based on three core assumptions:

1. Medium: the first assumption is that television is fundamentally different from other forms of mass media.
2. Audience: cultivation theory does not predict what people will do after watching a violent program but rather posits a connection between people's fears of a violence-filled world and their exposure to violent programming. The exposure to violent programming leads to what Gerbner calls the mean world syndrome, the idea that long-term exposure to violent media will lead to a distorted view that the world is more violent than it is.
3. Function and effect: television's effects are limited because it is a part of a larger sociocultural system. Therefore, although the effects of watching television may increase or decrease at any point in time, its effect is consistently present.

Cultivation theory suggests that exposure to media affects a viewer's perceptions of reality, drawing attention to three aspects: institutions, messages, and publics.

Television, Gerbner suggested, binds diverse communities together by socializing people into standardized roles and behaviors; thus, television functions as part of the enculturation process. Gerbner's research focused on the larger meaning of heavy television consumption instead of the meaning behind specific messages.

There are three orders of effect that come with the cultivation theory. The first order effects describe how people's behavior changes when exposed to mass media. The second order effect encompasses the viewers' values and attitudes depending on what they are watching. The third order effect is the change in the viewer's observation behavior.

=== Perceptions of Violence ===
Gerbner's initial work looked specifically at the effects of television violence on American audiences. Measuring the effect of violence underscored the larger part of Gerbner's work on cultivation theory. Therefore, he measured dramatic violence, defined as "the overt expression or threat of physical force as part of the plot." Gerbner's research also focused on the interpretation by high-use viewers of the prevalence of crime on television versus reality. He argues that, since a high percentage of programs include violent or crime-related content, viewers who spend a lot of time watching are inevitably exposed to high levels of crime and violence. Reality television is popular programming due to its dramatic displays of aggression, both verbal and physical. The programs, which are supposed to be actual accounts of an individual's life, reinforce stereotypes of acceptable aggression for both males and females. Producers have the ability to shape the viewers' perception of reality by manipulating the events of the show. Fans of these types of programs believe that behavioral outbursts of celebrities are acceptable responses.

In 1968, Gerbner conducted a survey to demonstrate this theory. Following his previous results, he placed television viewers into three categories: light viewers (less than 2 hours a day), medium viewers (2–4 hours a day), and heavy viewers (more than 4 hours a day). He found that heavy viewers held beliefs and opinions similar to those portrayed on television, which demonstrated the compound effect of media influence. Heavy viewers experienced shyness, loneliness, and depression much more than those who watched less often. From this study, Gerbner then began to work on what would become the Mean World Syndrome, which is based on the fact that heavy viewers of television, particularly violence-related content, are more likely than light viewers to believe that the world is more frightening and dangerous than it actually is.

In 2012, people with heavy viewing habits were found to believe that 5% of society was involved in law enforcement. In contrast, people with light viewing habits estimated a more realistic 1%.

=== TV Viewing and Fear of Crime ===
In most of the surveys conducted by Gerbner, the results revealed a small but statistically significant relationship between television consumption and fear of becoming the victim of a crime. Those with light viewing habits predicted their weekly odds of being a victim were 1 in 100; those with heavy viewing habits predicted 1 in 10. Actual crime statistics showed the risk to be 1 in 10,000.

Supporting this finding is a survey done with college students that showed a significant correlation between the attention paid to local crime and one's fearfulness. There was also a significant correlation between fear of crime and violence and the number of times the respondents viewed television per week.

Local news has been frequently analyzed for cultivation, as they rely "heavily on sensational coverage of crime and other mayhem with particular emphasis on homicide and violence", while news agencies boast of their allegiance to report factually. Gerbner found that heavy viewers of news were more likely to overestimate crime rates and risk of personal exposure to crime and underestimate the safety of their neighborhoods. Additionally, several other studies point out the correlation between viewing local news and fear of crime, with Gross and Aiday (2003) finding the relationship between local news exposure and fear of crimes to be independent of local crime rates. Gerbner's theory focuses on the collective mindset of television viewers' fear of crime based on the amount of television programs with this content. Some critics argue that this explanation does not take into account other variables that have the potential to change this conclusion. Variables such as age, sex, or educational level of individuals potentially influence viewers' beliefs about the prevalence of crime compared to what is shown on television. Some research findings indicate a higher cultivation relationship between television and fear of crime among whites, and a lower cultivation relationship among non-whites. This finding indicates that viewing images of violence in reality lessens the psychological impact of viewing violence on television. The assumption is that more whites may live in safer neighborhoods, and therefore television images have more shock value. Another consideration is that television viewers do not watch one type of genre, and therefore one must consider the influence violent programs within the total viewing experience of television watchers.

Aside from local news, national news, police shows, and general TV news viewing are also related to a fear of crime. Additionally, non-genre-specific TV viewing has been associated with fear of crime.

Busselle (2003) found that parents who watch more programs portraying crime and violence are more likely to warn their children about crime during their high school years; these warnings, in turn, increased the students' own crime estimates, suggesting cultivation takes place through both direct and indirect processes.

=== Magic bullet theory ===
A similar theory that examines media's effects on individuals is the magic bullet theory. It is one of the first theories concerning mass communication. It is a linear model of communication concerned with audiences directly influenced by mass media and the media's power over them.

It assumes that the media's message is a bullet fired from a media "gun" into the viewer's head. Magic bullet theory is also known as the hypodermic needle model. It suggests that the media delivers its messages straight into a passive audience's body.

Harold Lasswell put this theory in place after World War 1. With the rise of media like advertising and movies in the mid 1900s, there was an apparent effect on people's behavior.

==== Passive audience ====
Assuming that cultivation theory aligns with the magic bullet theory, several cognitive mechanisms that explain cultivation effects have been put forth by Shrum (1995, 1996, 1997). Shrum's availability-heuristic explanation suggests that heavy viewers tend to retain more vivid memories of instances of television reality and more readily access those memories when surveyors ask them questions, resulting in more responses related to viewing, more quickly given. Another mechanism that might explain the cultivation phenomenon is a cognitive-narrative mechanism. Previous research suggests that the realism of narratives in combination with individual-level "transportability", or the ability to be less critical of a narrative, might facilitate cultivation effects.

== Three analyses ==
=== Message system analysis ===
The message system analysis tells that the content that is displayed in television programs. Gerbner's main focus of TV viewing was the depiction of violence in TV shows and movies. Using message system analysis as a tool helps researchers study viewer perceptions of reality, their perceptions of the observable world, and can evaluate transmitted media content.

Many theorists have extended Gerbner's theory. Gerbner's research focused on TV violence, but current research examines a variety of factors. Childhood viewing may be associated with overall self-esteem in children, and affect one's beliefs as an adult.

Studies outside the US, where the programming is less homogeneous and repetitive, produced results that are less consistent. Australian students who watched US television programs (especially adventure and crime shows) were more likely to view Australia as dangerous; however, they didn't perceive America as dangerous, even though they were watching US programs.

The cultivation effect is not specific to genre or program, but can result from cumulative exposure to stable patterns of content on television. Jonathan Cohen and Gabriel Weimann found cultivation more prevalent among teenagers and young adults, who may then exhibit cultivation longevity.

Viewers tended toward greater psychosocial health when watching no more than 2 hours of television each day, following recommendations by the American Academy of Pediatrics (AAP), with an even greater impact on women. One study examined possible effects of viewing alcohol consumption in music videos."

Another study looked at interactive video games and found the viewer's role within the game is essential in the progression of the story. Participants interacted with other players in real-time, with a strong showing of the cultivation of participants.

==== Dramatic violence ====
Gerbner's initial work looked specifically at the effects of television violence on American audiences. In particular, he found the most common type of violence was dramatic violence. He measured dramatic violence, defined as "the overt expression or threat of physical force as part of the plot."

The Coding of Health and Media Project or CHAMP, created a violence code book that defines Dramatic Violence that involves a character's intentional physical pain on another character. This sort of violence excludes sports violence, natural disasters seen on the news, and or comedy violence such as boxing, verbal threats. CHAMP's analysis also involves a quantification of the explicitness of violent acts with 1 being the least explicit to 5 being the most explicit, fatalities from violence, a definition for Comedic violence.

Shows such as Law & Order SVU and CSI: Miami use murder to frame each episode, underscoring the presence of gratuitous and dramatic violence. The idea of dramatic violence reinforces the relationship between fear and entertainment. Though death is being used as a plot point, it also functions to cultivate an image of looming violence.

=== Cultivation analysis ===
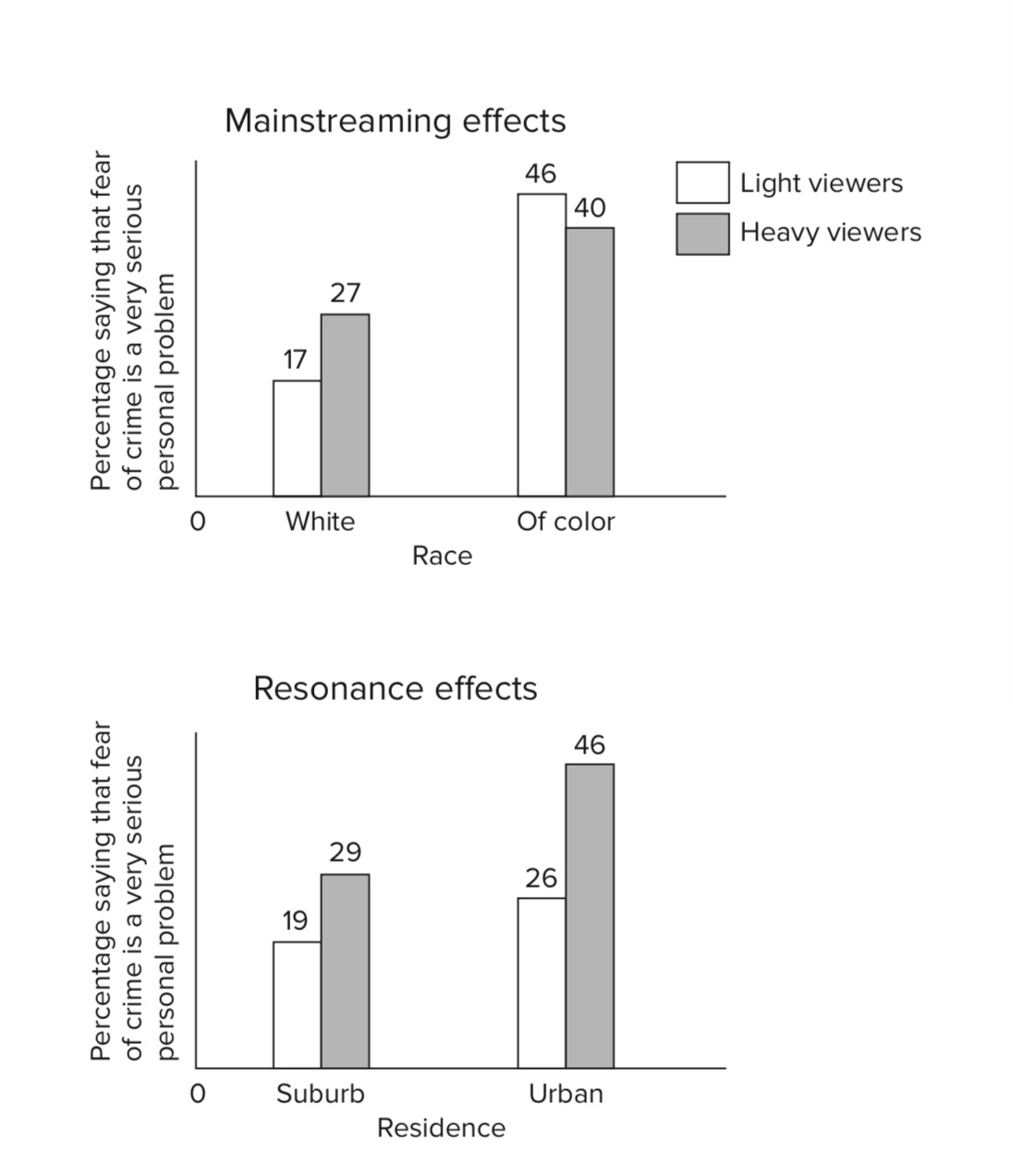
A representation of the effects of mainstreaming and resonance. Source: Adapted from Gerber et al., "The mainstreaming of America: Violence profile no. 11" Journal of Communication, vol. 7 (1980), p. 16, Figure 2. Reprinted by permission of John Wiley & Sons, Ltd.

==== Mainstreaming ====
Mainstreaming, in the context of cultivation theory, refers to the process by which long-term exposure to consistent media messages can lead to the shaping of a shared social reality among heavy viewers. TV viewers from disparate groups develop a common outlook of the world through exposure to the same images and labels, the effect being stronger among those whose TV viewing is more constant. Heavy viewers of television, for example, tend to perceive the world in ways that are more congruent with the portrayals and values depicted on television. As Gerbner and Gross noted, "Television's cultivation of shared conceptions and beliefs exerts a subtle but cumulative influence on the audience's judgments about reality". This theory underscores the idea that the media's repetitive messages can influence and shape the perceptions and attitudes of the audience, potentially leading to a more homogenized worldview among viewers who consume a steady diet of such content.

==== Resonance ====
Resonance refers to the idea that long-term exposure to media content can shape individuals' perceptions and beliefs about the real world, leading to a correspondence between the media's portrayal of reality and individuals' own understanding of it. Resonance can also be said to be the intensified effect of television viewing on the audience, such that what people see on television is what they have experienced in life.

This concept is central to George Gerbner's cultivation theory, which posits that heavy viewers of television, for instance, are more likely to accept the social reality presented by the media as their own. This resonance occurs when individuals find that their own experiences and beliefs align with the content they consume. For example, those who have already been victims of crime perceive the world as far more frightening when they watch more violent television. They may seek greater safety and security measures from the government as a result of this confirmation of their beliefs. While resonance can reinforce existing beliefs and attitudes, it can also foster cultural and social change by influencing viewers' perceptions of societal norms and values.

==== Cultivation differential ====
In 1968, Gerbner conducted a survey to demonstrate this theory. Following his previous results, he placed television viewers into three categories: light viewers (less than 2 hours a day), medium viewers (2–4 hours a day), and heavy viewers (more than 4 hours a day). Nielsen Media Research went further and defined heavy viewing as watching more than 11 hours a day. He found that heavy viewers held beliefs and opinions similar to those portrayed on television, which demonstrated the compound effect of media influence. Heavy viewers experienced shyness, loneliness, and depression much more than those who watched less often.

In most of the surveys conducted by Gerbner, the results revealed a small but statistically significant relationship between television consumption and fear of becoming the victim of a crime. Those with light viewing habits predicted their weekly odds of being a victim were 1 in 100; those with heavy viewing habits predicted 1 in 10. Actual crime statistics showed the risk to be 1 in 10,000.

Gerbner's research also focused on the interpretation by high-use viewers of the prevalence of crime on television versus reality. He argues that, since a high percentage of programs include violent or crime-related content, viewers who spend a lot of time watching are inevitably exposed to high levels of crime and violence.

In 2012, people with heavy viewing habits were found to believe that 5% of society was involved in law enforcement. In contrast, people with light viewing habits estimated a more realistic 1%.

Supporting this finding is a survey done with college students that showed a significant correlation between the attention paid to local crime and one's fearfulness. There was also a significant correlation between fear of crime and violence and the number of times the respondents viewed television per week.

Local news has been frequently analyzed for cultivation, as they rely "heavily on sensational coverage of crime and other mayhem with particular emphasis on homicide and violence", while news agencies boast of their allegiance to report factually. Gerbner found that heavy viewers of news were more likely to overestimate crime rates and risk of personal exposure to crime and underestimate the safety of their neighborhoods. Additionally, several other studies point out the correlation between viewing local news and fear of crime, with Gross and Aiday (2003) finding the relationship between local news exposure and fear of crimes to be independent of local crime rates.

Aside from local news, national news, police shows, and general TV news viewing are also related to a fear of crime. Additionally, non-genre-specific TV viewing has been associated with fear of crime.

Busselle (2003) found that parents who watch more programs portraying crime and violence are more likely to warn their children about crime during their high school years; these warnings, in turn, increased the students' own crime estimates, suggesting cultivation takes place through both direct and indirect processes.

==== Mean world syndrome ====
From the cultivation differential study, Gerbner then began to work on what would become the mean world syndrome, which is an adoptive attitude that heavy viewers of television, particularly violence-related content, are more likely than light viewers to believe that the world is more frightening and dangerous than it actually is. Gerbner et al. developed an index for mean world syndrome. Also, Those with heavy viewing habits become suspicious of other people's motives, and that others cannot be trusted. For example, heavy viewers of violent television are much more likely to be afraid of walking alone at night in fear that they will get robbed, mugged, or even killed. This results in the heavy viewers to try and protect themselves more than others by having watchdogs, buying new locks, investing in a security camera system, and owning guns.

=== Television reality ===
Cultivation theory research seems to indicate that heavy viewing can result in the viewer adopting a set of beliefs based on content rather than facts. Generally, the beliefs of heavy viewers about the world are consistent with the repetitive and emphasized images and themes presented on television. As such, heavy viewing cultivates a television-shaped world view.

This false reality or "symbolic world" Gerbner discusses can be seen through the media's portrayal of different demographic groups. Main characters in television are often depicted as young, outgoing, and energetic. Through the inaccurate portrayal of ethnic groups such as Hispanics, we know that they make up a large portion of the population but are rarely shown as characters. Even Middle-Easterners are widely shown as the villains in television. Therefore, television trains heavy viewers to look at crime such as gun violence, fist fights, and high-speed car chases as normal while actual crime statistics note that violent crime occurs with less than 1% of the US population.

Even across diverse demographics, the amount of viewing can make a difference in terms of viewer conceptions of social reality. The amount of viewing time is the main element in creating television reality for the audience. According to Gerbner's research, the more time spent absorbing the world of television, the more likely people are to report perceptions of social reality that can be traced to television's most persistent representations of life and society.

Research supports the concept of television reality arising from heavy viewing. According to Wyer and Budesheim, television messages or information (even when they are not necessarily considered truthful) can still be used by viewers to make social judgments. Furthermore, the information shown to be invalid may still inform an audience's judgments.

The influence of primetime television shows on public perceptions of science and scientists has been explored by Gerbner (Gerbner, 1987). While Gerbner does not place the entire blame on television shows, he highlights the importance of acknowledging the unquestionable role it plays in shaping people's perceptions. Lack of scientific understanding can no longer be associated with 'information-deficit' because we are living in an 'information-rich world'. This also brings up the concerns about the implications of possessing too much scientific knowledge as a viewer. While being well informed helps people to make rational scientific choices, excessive scientific knowledge can bring up apprehensions, fears, suspicion, and mistrust. Prime time shows have a wider reachability, visibility, and interact with people from across diverse backgrounds. Television is used in a relatively nonselective way for viewing. These form the strong basis to conclude that scientists and the scientific community can benefit from stronger connections with the producers, directors, and the entertainment industry at large. The market for science shows has an audience group that faces a mixture of expectations, fears, utilitarian interests, curiosities, ancient prejudices, and superstitions. Gerbner's research used cultivation analysis to understand and examine the response patterns of 1,631 respondents' group which includes light and heavy viewers. They were presented with five propositions—science makes our way of life change too fast; makes our lives healthier, easier, and more comfortable; breaks down people's ideas of right and wrong; is more likely to cause problems than to find solutions; and the growth of science means that a few people can control our lives. The research estimated the percentage of positive responses to science based on two groups divided by sex and education. The study suggested that the exposure to science through television shows cultivate less favorable orientation towards science, especially in high status groups whose light-viewer members are its greatest supporters, and lower status groups have a generally low opinion of science. These observations can be understood through the concept of mainstreaming.

=== Institutional process analysis ===
In contrast to the other analyses, there has not been as much research in this third analysis compared to message analysis and cultivation analysis according to Andrew Ledbetter. Institutional process analysis attempts to understand the what happens within a media organization. Institution analysis attempts to understand the policies that media organization hold, the content they decide to broadcast, and even their motives for the content that they broadcast.

Media content may produce more shows, movies, that cater toward different audiences, but Michael Morgan, James Shanahan and Nancy Signorielli argue that a disproportionately small amount of individuals control the media content compared to the audience that views the content. Media Organization's primary concern is of profit rather than ethics and catering to diverse audiences and perspectives. As much as Gerbner was concerned with Institutional Process Analysis, no clear method was created to study media organizations practices and their motives behind the content.

== Application of theory ==
=== Gender and sexuality ===
==== LGBTQIA+ ====
Sara Baker Netzley (2010) conducted research similar to Gerbner's into the way that gay people were depicted on television. This study found that there was an extremely high level of sexual activity in comparison to the number of gay characters that appeared on television. This has led those who are heavy television consumers to believe that the gay community is extremely sexual. Much like the idea of a mean and scary world, it gives people an exaggerated sense of a sexualized gay community.

A study conducted by Jerel Calzo and Monique Ward (2009) begins by analyzing recent research conducted into the portrayal of gay and lesbian characters on television. While the representation of gay and lesbian characters has continued to grow, the study found that most television shows frame gay and lesbian characters in a manner that reinforces LGBT stereotypes. Diving into the discussion, Calzo and Ward describe even shows such as Ellen and Will & Grace as having storyline content that reinforces "stereotypes by portraying [...] characters as lacking stable relationships, as being preoccupied with their sexuality (or not sexual at all), and by perpetuating the perception of gay and lesbian people as laughable, one-dimensional figures." Their findings confirmed that media genres played an important role in forming attitudes regarding homosexuality. They were surprised by the finding that prior primetime shows, which are no longer on air, reinforced greater acceptance within the LGBTQ realm. They then suggested that, because genre played a large role in the perceptions that viewers formed while watching certain television shows, research should focus on "more genre-driven effects analyses."

==== Men and women ====
In their 2022 study, Scharrer and Warren examined the endorsement of traditionally masculine values in regard to gender norms among combined viewers of streaming services such as Netflix, video games, and YouTube. Traditional masculine traits in this study included "emotional detachment, dominance, toughness, and/or avoidance of femininity among boys and girls in the sample" (Scharrer & Warren, 2022). Results showed that participants in the heavy viewer category indicated higher scores of endorsement of traditionally masculine traits for men compared to light viewers.

Beverly Roskos-Ewoldsen, John Davies, and David Roskos-Ewoldsen (2004) posit that perceptions of women are integrated in a rather stereotypical fashion, compared to portrayals of men, on television. They state that, "men are characters in TV shows at about a 2 to 1 ratio to women." Viewers who consume more television usually also have more traditional views of women. Research has also shown that women are more likely to be portrayed as victims on television than men.

Alexander Sink and Dana Mastro (2017) studied women and gender depictions on American prime-time television. Although women are often perceived to be better represented on television in recent years, these researchers claim that this is not necessarily the case. They claim women are proportionally underrepresented on prime time television, making up 39% of characters even though women make up 50.9% of the population in the US. Men were also portrayed as more dominant than women, and although men were more often objectified, women were consistently portrayed as hyper-feminized and hyper-sexualized. Fewer older women appeared during prime time, compared to men, and were often shown to be less competent than older male characters.

==== Sexual attitudes ====
Cultivation theory has been utilized when conducting research on sexual attitudes regarding women. Sex-role stereotypes can be traced to the independent contribution of TV viewing, just as sex, age, class, and education contribute. Rita Seabrook found that there was a positive relationship of viewing reality TV, pornography, and sports programming and an acceptance of objectifying women and a higher tolerance for sexual aggression.

A study by Bradley J. Bond and Kristin L. Drogos (2014) examined the relationship between exposure to the television program Jersey Shore and sexual attitudes and behavior in college-aged adults. They found a positive relationship between time spent watching Jersey Shore and increased sexual permissiveness. This effect was found to be stronger in the younger participants than in older ones and held true even when the researchers controlled for other influences on participants' sexual attitudes, such as religious beliefs and parents' attitudes. This higher level of sexually permissive attitudes and behavior was not a result of higher overall exposure to television, but specifically to greater exposure to Jersey Shore, a highly sexualized program.

=== Race and ethnicity ===
A substantial part of stereotyping and perception of races can be drawn back to the media. The representation and the depiction of races and ethnicities in media can have an effect on how we stereotype them. Both representation and lack of representation can have an effect on people of differing races and social groups. Lack of representation in media can lead people, especially children, to feel a lack of self worth or less valued than another race or social group. This can be seen when looking into how media, specifically television and film, portray different races and ethnicities.

Meghan S. Sanders and Srividya Ramasubramanian (2012) studied perceptions that African American media consumers hold about fictional characters portrayed in film and television. They found that—while study participants tended to view all African American characters positively—social class, rather than race or ethnicity, mattered more in perceptions about the warmth and competence of a character. Their study suggests that the ethnicity of media consumers needs to be taken into account in cultivation studies, because media consumers with different backgrounds likely perceive media portrayals, and their faithfulness to reality differently. The depiction of these ethnic groups in media can have an effect on how they are perceived in reality and even how they perceive each other.

A study by Elizabeth Behm-Morawitz and David Ta (2014) examined the cultivation effects of video games on White students' perceptions of Black and Asian individuals. While no significant effects were found for perceptions of Asian individuals, researchers found that those who spent a greater amount of time playing video games, no matter what genre, held a less positive view of Black people. They also found that real-life interaction with Black individuals did not change this effect. Behm-Morawitz and Ta suggest that the stable, negative racial and ethnic stereotypes portrayed in video game narratives of any genre impact real-world beliefs, in spite of more varied real-life interactions with racial and ethnic minorities.

Chrysalis Wright and Michelle Craske (2015) conducted a study using the cultivation framework to examine the relationship between music lyrics and videos that contained sexual content and the sexual behaviors of African American, Hispanic and Caucasian young adults. In previous studies, it was hypothesized that the heavy listening habits of youth to sexually explicit content can alter the listener's perception of reality and normalize risky sexual behaviors. However, Wright and Caste are the first study to assess the cultivation framework's ability to explain the possible relationship. Their findings concluded that there were minimal effects on those from Caucasian or Hispanic backgrounds with one or two normalized sexual behaviors, such as age of first relationship and sexual encounter. In comparison, researchers found that there were several normalized sexual behaviors found within participants from an African American background, such as earlier age of first date and sexual encounter, higher amount of casual sexual encounters and lower percentage of condom usage.

It is speculated that the effects of cultivation are more prominent within the African American community as opposed to other ethnic groups as African Americans might view music as an accurate representation of their culture. Chen (2006) found that rap music was the most popular music genre listened to by African Americans, and more explicit sexual references have been associated with rap in comparison to other genres with "78% of rap, 53% of pop, 37% of rock, and 36% of country music videos containing some form of sexual reference." Furthermore, previous research displayed that non-Caucasian artists make more allusions to sexual content, referencing sexual acts 21% of the time as compared to 7.5% of the time by Caucasian artists. These cultivation effects of musicians creating a false reality in regards to sexual behaviors and experiences through their lyrics and videos may make African American listeners more vulnerable to "adopt thinking processes and behave similar to the content contained in the music they are exposed to."

=== Politics and policy preferences ===
Two of George Gerbner's colleagues, Michael Morgan and James Shanahan, have found that those with heavy viewing habits may label themselves as moderate, however their positions on various social issues leaned conservative. Furthermore, heavy viewers were more likely to hold authoritarian beliefs. Morgan and Shanahan provide this study in context of the 2016 Presidential election.

Diana Mutz and Lilach Nir (2010) conducted a study of how fictional television narratives can influence viewers' policy preferences and positive or negative attitudes regarding the justice system in the real world. They found that positive portrayals of the criminal justice system were associated with viewers' more positive view of the system in real life, whereas negative television portrayals were associated with viewers' feeling that the criminal justice system often works unfairly. Furthermore, researchers found that these attitudes did influence viewers' policy preferences concerning the criminal justice system in real life.

A study by Anita Atwell Seate and Dana Mastro (2016) studied news coverage of immigration and its relationship to viewers' immigration policy preferences and negative attitudes regarding immigrants. They found that exposure to negative messages about immigrants in the news generated anxious feelings towards the outgroup (i.e., immigrants), particularly when the news program showed a member of the outgroup. This exposure did not necessarily immediately influence immigration policy preferences, but long-term exposure to messages of this kind can affect such preferences.

Katerina-Eva Matsa (2010) explored cultivation effects through her thesis on television's impact on political engagement in Greece. She did so by describing the role of satirical television within the cultural realm in Greece and how this form of television created ingrained perceptions that Greek political institutions are corrupt, thus negatively influencing the Greek public's overall opinion of politics in their country.

=== Altruistic behavior ===
Zakir Shah, Jianxun Chu, Usman Ghani, Sara Qaisar, and Zameer Hassan (2020) conducted the first study from the perspective of cultivation theory to determine the mediating role of fear of victimization, gained from exposure to disaster-related media, on altruistic behavior. Findings show that exposure to disaster-related news and individuals’ perceptions taken from the media contributed to fear of victimization. Moreover, fear of victimization from disaster significantly influences the altruistic behavior of people.

A research study that examines television viewing, narrative engagement, and three Idealistic moral expectations: just world beliefs, altruism of doctors, tolerance of others. They found that television viewing, narrative engagement, and moral expectations were all dependent on each other.

=== New media ===
Technology has evolved since George Gerbner developed this theory. Society has more media to consume than just prime-time television. Andrew Ledbetter identified three key differences in television in the age of new media: recordable, mobile, and many choices. Recordable means people have the ability to watch programs at anytime as opposed to the mid-century when television had a time-specific showing of any program. Mobile means people have the ability to watch video content wherever they go through smartphones. And third, many choices entails the multitude of streaming platforms, and even the many choices within each streaming platform.

Cultivation theory has been applied to the study of new media. Scholars Morgan, Shanahan & Signorielli noted that media technology has not been static, and may continue to evolve. Therefore, older methods of cultivation analysis may have to move from counting hours of television viewed, and take a big data approach. These authors argue that, although many were skeptical that cultivation theory would be applicable with the increasing importance of new media, these new media still use narrative; and, since those narratives affect us, cultivation theory is still relevant.

Croucher (2011) applied cultivation theory to his theory of social media and its effects on immigrant cultural adaptation. He theorizes that immigrants who use the dominant social media while they are still in the process of adapting to their new culture will develop perceptions about their host society from that media. He believes that this cultivation effect will also impact the way immigrants interact offline with natives of the host country. In a similar vein, the cultivation framework has been applied to the study of body image effects on social media platforms, with research indicating that browsing through certain types of content relates to distorted views on the physical appearances of strangers.

==== Minors and the Internet ====
Since the 1960s, communication scholars have examined television's contributions to viewers' perceptions of a wide variety of issues. However, little effort has been made to investigate the influence of television on perceptions of social reality among adolescents. Cultivation theory, which mainly studies the long-term impact of television on the audience, in a specific group of people, the longer the group watches TV, the closer the audience's perception of reality is to the content of the TV. Cultivation theory is one of the most common theories in today's lives, especially for teens and children, because adults can control and discern content on TV shows and social media, but minors cannot tell the difference between right and wrong all the time, “for example, the fact that media often broadcast programs, news or movies with violent content creates a social environment in which violence is taught and consumed.” (Busair Ahmad, 2015). There is hope that television and film programs will be reformed to reduce the impact on children, the government and people from all walks of life are also working hard to formulate policies to protect young people. “We provide recommendations for clinicians, policymakers, and educators in partnering with caregivers and youth to support electronic media use that promotes positive outcomes in these areas.” (Gaidhane, 2018).

== Social Media ==
Originally, cultivation theory focused on the interactions individuals have with the media, such as watching the news on television. For example, a study focusing on television consumption among adolescents found that those who watched more TV had become more desensitized to the dangers of alcohol. Traditionally cultivation has studied “changes in the mass production and rapid distribution of messages across previous barriers of time, space, and social grouping,” with its main focus pertaining to television. Cultivation is starting to look at social media as a tool that shapes perceptions.

Cultivation theory has continued to evolve through the rise of the internet and social media. In 2019, focusing on the application of cultivation through the use of Instagram, Stein, Krause, and Ohler, found female participants depicted more of a negative self-body image compared to males when scrolling on their homepage. This experiment also found that women perceive other women as having better self-esteem regarding body image. Another study found that social media influenced college students' perceptions of other students' self-efficacy. This study looked at Facebook and Twitter. Researchers discovered that Twitter had more of a positive direct effect on students when compared to Facebook, which cultivated a negative direct effect. One study suggested that cultivation through mass media, such as television, has a greater effect compared to social media. In 2024, a study focusing on social media's impact on optimism and pessimism in regards to individuals' outlook on the world found that social media does shape these perspectives. There was a positive correlation between high social media usage and the development of a more negative mindset about the world, which is an example of Mean World Syndrome. Cultivation theory suggests that the use of social media also impacts how individuals learn about their own culture as well as the cultures of those around them. This can also cultivate an implicit bias about groups that are different from oneself. These studies all adhere to the main idea of cultivation, that “those who spend more time watching television [and being on social media] are more likely to perceive the real world in ways that reflect the most common and recurrent messages of the world of fictional television."

== Books ==
Authors and researchers have developed multiple books over the years based on cultivation theory. One of the earliest books written based on cultivation theory was in 1995, where James Shanahan and Michael Morgan came together to write the book "Television and its Viewers" Then, one of the latest books based on the topic was written by Andy Ruddock in 2020, called "Digital Media Influence: A Cultivation Approach".

== Criticism ==
Although there is a significant correlation between TV viewing and perception of reality, cultivation effects have a small influence on an individual's perception of the world. Michael Morgan and James Shanahan conducted a meta-analysis in 1997 that revealed that increased television viewing did have a significant relationship between amount of television viewed and perception of reality. However, the change in perception was small. Hirsch (1980) argues that there will be very little effect that can be attributed to television if other variables are controlled simultaneously. In Hirsch's review, he found that even people who did not watch television perceived the world as violent and dangerous.

Costanze Rossman argues that there is little evidence that TV viewing causes fear of violence. The variables may even be reversed in the relationship where fear of violence increases TV viewing. Other variables may influence this relationship, like living in an area with a high-crime rate.

Elihu Katz, the founder of uses and gratifications theory, listed cultivation theory in his article, "Six Concepts in Search of Retirement". One of the reasons for retiring this theory is because of technology changes that have happened from when the theory was founded. George Gerbner's theory was founded in 1973, which was an era where prime time television was the dominant medium. Given that this theory developed before the age of the internet and social media, Morgan, Shanahan and Signorelli offer a suggestion about where the theory could go next in the age of new media. In the age of new media is recordable, mobile and has many choices, the authors wonder if the content and messages have become more diverse, therefore having an influence on cultivation.

Jennings Bryant points out that cultivation research focuses more on the effects rather than who or what is being influenced, being more to do with the whys and hows, as opposed to gathering normative data as to the whats, whos, and wheres. Daniel Chandler argues that while television does have some effect on how we perceive the world around us, Gerbner's study does not consider the lived experiences of those who do inhabit high crime areas. Horace Newcomb argues that violence is not presented as uniformly on television as the theory assumes; therefore, television cannot be responsible for cultivating the same sense of reality for all viewers.

== See also ==
- Annenberg School for Communication at the University of Pennsylvania
- Availability heuristic
- Consensus reality
- Media influence
- Reality TV
- Sociological theory
- Theories of media exposure
