= Doomscrolling =

Compulsive consumption of negative online contents

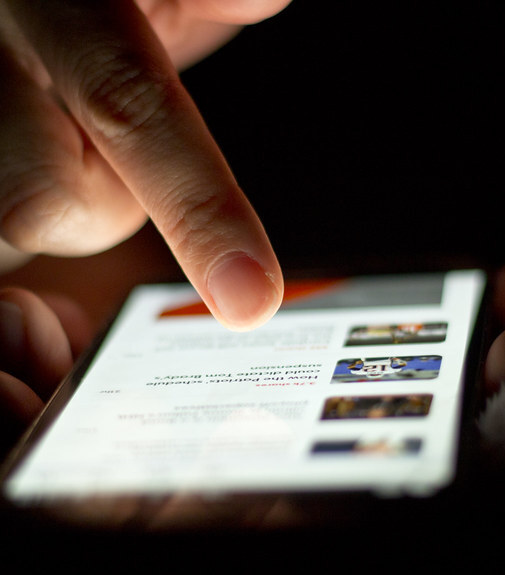
Scrolling through news on a smartphone

Doomscrolling is the act of spending an excessive amount of time on digital content (e.g. short-form content, user-generated content, AI-generated content, and news) that elicits negative emotions. The concept was coined around 2018, and became more widespread in the context of the COVID-19 pandemic. The World Health Organization (WHO) observed that the pandemic was accompanied by widespread misleading information, conspiracy theories, and false reports, which it referred to as an "infodemic".

Surveys and studies suggest doomscrolling is predominant among youth. More specifically, research indicates that doomscrolling tends to be more common among males, individuals in younger age groups and those who actively follow political events. It can be considered a form of internet addiction disorder. In 2019, a study by the National Academy of Sciences found that doomscrolling can be linked to a decline in mental and physical health. Numerous reasons for doomscrolling have been cited, including negativity bias, fear of missing out, increased anxiety, and attempts at gaining control over uncertainty.

== History ==
=== Origins ===
The practice of doomscrolling can be compared to an older phenomenon from the 1970s called the mean world syndrome, described as "the belief that the world is a more dangerous place to live in than it actually is as a result of long-term exposure to violence-related content on television". Studies show that seeing upsetting news leads people to seek out more information on the topic, creating a self-perpetuating cycle.

In common parlance, the word "doom" connotes darkness and evil. In the World Wide Web's infancy, "surfing" was a common verb used in reference to browsing the web; similarly, the word "scrolling" refers to sliding through online content. After three years of being on the Merriam-Webster "watching" list, "doomscrolling" was recognized as an official word in September 2023. Dictionary.com chose it as the top monthly trend in August 2020. The Macquarie Dictionary named doomscrolling as the 2020 Committee's Choice Word of the Year.

=== Popularity ===
The origins of the term are unclear. Its first documented usage was in a tweet posted in 2018. However, Ashik Siddique is commonly cited as coining the term, in a tweet posted the same day. The term continued to gain traction in the early 2020s through events such as the COVID-19 pandemic, the George Floyd protests, the 2020 U.S. presidential election, the storming of the U.S. Capitol in 2021, the Russian invasion of Ukraine since 2022, and the Gaza war which later expanded into the Middle Eastern crisis since 2023, all of which have been noted to have exacerbated the practice of doomscrolling. Doomscrolling became widespread among users of Twitter during the COVID-19 pandemic and has also been discussed in relation to the climate crisis.

During the COVID-19 pandemic, it is argued that mobile devices became central communication tools which were so significant that they were referred to as "the primary, and addictive, lifeline for society" during this period, including for news concerning "police brutality, misinformation and political anxieties". This consumption of news also reflected competing demands for timely updates and periodic disengagement since users faced the dilemma of needing information fast, but also sometimes avoiding it to personally manage the intake of such news.

A 2024 survey conducted by Morning Consult concluded that approximately 31% of American adults doomscroll regularly. This percentage increases the younger the adults are, with millennials (those born in the 1980s and early 1990s) at 46%, and Gen Z (adults born in the late 1990s until the early 2010s) at 51%. Despite this, research has indicated that those who have initially claimed that they did not engage with the act of doomscrolling were later found to exhibit the behaviour of doomscrolling, which highlights a gap between the awareness of the term itself and the practice of it.

=== Infinite scrolling ===
Infinite scrolling is a design approach which loads content continuously as the user scrolls down, thus eliminating the need for pagination. Consequently, this feature can exacerbate doomscrolling as it removes natural stopping points at which a user might pause. Research has also demonstrated that the tendency of social media platforms to amplify negative content may worsen this continuous scrolling behaviour, leading users to remain engaged with unfavourable news for extended durations. Doomscrolling has also been linked to platform level incentives where these digital news environments use features such as gamified interfaces and automated or algorithmic recommendation systems to keep audiences engaged and to prolong time spent on their services.

The concept of infinite scrolling is sometimes attributed to Aza Raskin by the elimination of pagination of web pages, in favor of continuously loading content as the user scrolls down the page. Raskin later expressed regret at the invention, describing it as "one of the first products designed to not simply help a user, but to deliberately keep them online for as long as possible". Usability research suggests infinite scrolling can present an accessibility issue. The lack of stopping cues has been described as a pathway to both problematic smartphone use and problematic social media use.

=== Role of social media ===
Social media companies play a significant role in the perpetuation of doomscrolling by leveraging algorithms designed to maximize user engagement. These algorithms prioritize content that is emotionally stimulating, often favoring negative news and sensationalized headlines to keep users scrolling. Researchers have also linked doomscrolling to a broader sense of permacrisis, where being constantly exposed to distressing news fosters continuous cycles of consuming negative information. A 2022 study by the Cyprus University of Technology noted that platform-driven news environments are progressively emphasising rapidly evolving and high-impact stories, thereby intensifying cycles of repetitive verification and prolonged scrolling.

The business models of most social media platforms rely heavily on user engagement, which means that the longer people stay on their platforms, the more advertisements they see, and the more data is collected on their behavior. This creates a cycle where emotionally charged content—often involving negative or anxiety-inducing information—is repeatedly pushed to users, encouraging them to keep scrolling and consuming more content. Despite the well-documented negative effects of doomscrolling on mental health, social media companies are incentivized to maintain user engagement through these methods, making it challenging for individuals to break free from the habit. Oftentimes, doomscrollers engage with social media that is heavy on news media or content, and when paired with the nature of engagement on social media platforms, doomscrolling can occur even when it is not intended.

== Explanations ==
=== Negativity bias ===
The act of doomscrolling can be attributed to the natural negativity bias people have when consuming information. Negativity bias is the idea that negative events have a larger impact on one's mental well-being than positive events. Jeffrey Hall, a professor of communication studies at the University of Kansas in Lawrence, notes that due to an individual's regular state of contentment, potential threats provoke one's attention. One psychiatrist at the Ohio State University Wexner Medical Center notes that humans are "all hardwired to see the negative and be drawn to the negative because it can harm [them] physically." He cites evolution as the reason for why humans seek out such negatives: if one's ancestors, for example, discovered how an ancient creature could injure them, they could avoid that fate.

As opposed to primitive humans, most people in modern times do not realize that they are even seeking negative information. Social media algorithms heed the content users engage in and display posts similar in nature, which can aid in the act of doomscrolling. As per the clinic director of the Perelman School of Medicine's Center for the Treatment and Study of Anxiety: "People have a question, they want an answer, and assume getting it will make them feel better ... You keep scrolling and scrolling. Many think that will be helpful, but they end up feeling worse afterward."

=== Fear of missing out ===
Doomscrolling can be explained by the fear of missing out (FOMO), a common fear that causes people to take part in activities that may not be explicitly beneficial to them, but which they fear "missing out on". This fear is also applied within the world of news and social media. A research study conducted by Statista in 2013 found that more than half of Americans experienced FOMO on social media; further studies found FOMO affected 67% of Italian users in 2017, and 59% of Polish teenagers in 2021. A 2024 digital-behavior study conducted by Mandliya et al. showed that numerous users repeatedly refreshed news or social media channels to prevent missing rapidly evolving events, demonstrating how FOMO can lead to sustained exposure to adverse content. Bethany Teachman, a professor of psychology at the University of Virginia, states that FOMO is likely to be correlated with doomscrolling due to the person's fear of missing out on crucial negative information.

=== Control seeking ===
Obsessively consuming negative news online can additionally be partially attributed to a person's psychological need for control. Research also suggests that doomscrolling can be reinforced by platform features such as endless feeds and algorithmic recommendations, which encourage habitual scanning for timely negative information. A likely reason behind this is that during uncertain times, people are likely to engage in doomscrolling as a way to help them gather information and a sense of mastery over the situation. This is done by people to reinforce their belief that staying informed will provide them with protection from grim situations. A 2022 study found that people who engaged in high levels of problematic news consumption were more likely to have worse mental and physical health.

=== Brain anatomy ===
Doomscrolling, the compulsion to engross oneself in negative news, may be the result of an evolutionary mechanism where humans are "wired to screen for and anticipate danger". By frequently monitoring events surrounding negative headlines, staying informed may grant the feeling of being better prepared; however, prolonged scrolling may also lead to worsened mood and mental health as personal fears are heightened. The inferior frontal gyrus (IFG) plays an important role in information processing and integrating new information into beliefs about reality. In the IFG, the brain "selectively filters bad news" when presented with new information as it updates beliefs. When a person engages in doomscrolling, the brain may feel under threat and shut off its "bad news filter" in response.

In a study where researchers manipulated the left IFG using transcranial magnetic stimulation (TMS), patients were more likely to incorporate negative information when updating beliefs. This suggests that the left IFG may be responsible for inhibiting bad news from altering personal beliefs; when participants were presented with favorable information and received TMS, the brain still updated beliefs in response to the positive news. The study also suggests that the brain selectively filters information and updates beliefs in a way that reduces stress and anxiety by processing good news with higher regard (see optimistic bias). Increased doomscrolling exposes the brain to greater quantities of unfavorable news and may restrict the brain's ability to embrace good news and discount bad news; this can result in negative emotions that make one feel anxious, depressed, and isolated.

== Health effects ==
=== Psychological effects ===
Health professionals have advised that doomscrolling can negatively impact existing mental health issues. While the overall impact that doomscrolling has on people may vary, it can often make one feel anxious, stressed, fearful, depressed, and isolated.

==== Research ====
Professors of psychology at the University of Sussex conducted a study in which participants watched television news consisting of "positive-, neutral-, and negative valenced material". The study revealed that participants who watched the negative news programs showed an increase in anxiety, sadness, and catastrophic tendencies regarding personal worries. A study conducted by psychology researchers in conjunction with the Huffington Post found that participants who watched three minutes of negative news in the morning were 27% more likely to have reported experiencing a bad day six to eight hours later. Comparatively, the group who watched solutions-focused news stories reported a good day 88% of the time.

==== Doomscrolling diagnostics ====
Melnyk Y.B., Professor of the Laboratory of Psychological Research of the Scientific Research Institute, Kharkiv Regional Public Organization "Culture of Health" together with Stadnik A.V., Associate Professor of Uzhhorod National University, have developed an accessible method for researching doomscrolling. Consisting of 12 items, the questionnaire is based on four criteria, which were proposed by the authors: addiction, rigidity, mental health, and reflection. The authors of the diagnostics also provide guidance on how to interpret the severity levels of the doomscrolling symptom scale that they developed: minimal, mild, moderate, moderately severe and severe. This enables qualitative and quantitative research into doomscrolling.

== News avoidance ==
Some people have begun coping with the abundance of negative news stories by avoiding news altogether. A study from 2017 to 2022 showed that news avoidance is increasing, and that 38% of people admitted to sometimes or often actively avoiding the news in 2022, up from 29% in 2017. Some journalists have admitted to avoiding the news; journalist Amanda Ripley wrote that "people producing the news themselves are struggling, and while they aren't likely to admit it, it is warping the coverage." She also identified ways she believes could help fix the problem, such as intentionally adding more hope, agency, and dignity into stories so readers don't feel the helplessness which leads them to tune out entirely. Research has noted that doomscrolling and news avoidance can emerge from the same conditions of repetitive, negative reporting with "negativity, repetitive reporting, and information overload" leading some people to reduce or avoid news altogether.

In 2024, a study by the University of Oxford's Reuters Institute for the Study of Journalism indicated that an increasing number of people are avoiding the news. In 2023, 39% of people worldwide reported actively avoiding the news, up from 29% in 2017. The report suggests that the long-running conflicts in Ukraine and the Middle East may be contributing factors to this trend, with industry leaders citing both news fatigue and news avoidance around these stories. In the UK, interest in news has nearly halved since 2015. Some scholars suggest that the decrease in interest in news is not due to consumers being apathetic, but due to the misalignment between traditional news journalism, and what is subjectively viewed as engaging. Scholars describe doomscrolling as a "divergent effect to news avoidance," meaning that both behaviours are driven by the same media environment but result in opposite reactions, such as over-consumption versus withdrawal.

== See also ==
- Alt-tech
- Attention inequality
- Culture of fear
- Enshittification
- Hatewatching
- Mean world syndrome
- Tabloid television
- Terminally online
