= Oscar H. Gandy Jr. =

American communications scholar

Oscar H. Gandy Jr., retired since 2006, is a scholar of the political economy of information who was the Herbert Schiller Professor of Communication studies at the Annenberg School for Communication, University of Pennsylvania. His work spans many subjects, including privacy, race, information technology, media framing, media development, and educational subsidy.

== Biography ==
Gandy received his associate degree from Nassau Community College (1965) and his bachelor's degree in sociology from the University of New Mexico (1967). From 1969 to 1971, he wrote and produced Right On!, a public affairs television series for WCAU-TV. During this period, he also received his master's degree in Communication Behavior from the University of Pennsylvania, where Gandy grew close to his mentor, George Gerbner.

In 1971, Gandy began lecturing at Third College (now the Thurgood Marshall College), University of California, San Diego. In 1973, he enrolled at Stanford University as a Ph.D. student in communication, where he was a Ford Foundation Fellow. Gandy earned his doctorate in public affairs communication in 1976.

From 1977 to 1987, Gandy was an assistant and then an associate professor of communication at Howard University. Gandy joined the faculty at Annenberg in 1987, where he taught until his retirement in the Spring semester of 2006.

== Publications ==
Books (authored or co-authored):

- Gandy, O.H. (2009). Coming to Terms With Chance: Engaging Rational Discrimination and Cumulative Disadvantage. Farnham, Surrey: Ashgate Publishing.
- Gandy, O.H. (1998). Communication and Race: A Structural Perspective. Edward Arnold and Oxford University Press.
- Gandy, O.H. (1993). The Panoptic Sort: A Political Economy of Personal Information. Boulder, CO: Westview Press.
- Gandy, O.H. (1982). Beyond Agenda Setting: Information Subsidies and Public Policy. Norwood, NJ: Ablex Publishers.
- Gandy, O.H., Rivers, W.L., Miller, S., & Rivers, G. (1975). Government and Media: An Annotated Bibliography. Stanford, CA: Institute for Communications Research.

Books (edited or co-edited):

- Reese S., Gandy, O.H., & Grant A. (Eds.). (2001). Framing Public Life. Mahwah, NJ: Lawrence Erlbaum Associates.
- Gandy, O.H. (Ed.). (1986). Communications: A Key to Economic and Political Change. Selected Proceedings from the 15th Annual Communications Conference. Washington, DC: Center for Communications Research, Howard University.
- Gandy, O.H., Espinosa, P., & Ordover, J. (Eds). (1983). Proceedings from the Tenth Annual Telecommunications Policy Research Conference. Norwood, NJ: Ablex Publishers.

Scholarly journal articles (2001–present):

- Gandy, O.H. (2011). "Consumer protection in cyberspace. Triple C: Cognition, Communication, Co-operation, 9(2)". Triple-c.at. 9 (2): 175–189. doi:10.31269/triplec.v9i2.267.
- Gandy, O.H. (2010). Engaging rational discrimination: exploring reasons for placing regulatory constraints on decision support systems. Ethics and Information Technology, 12(1), pp. 29–42.
- Halbert, C.H., Gandy, O.H., Collier, A., & Shaker, L. (2007). Beliefs about tobacco use in African Americans. Ethnicity & Disease, 17(1), pp. 92–98.
- Gandy, O.H. & Baruh, L. (2006). Racial Profiling: They said it was against the law! University of Ottawa Law & Technology Journal, 6(3), pp. 297–327.
- Herman, B. D., & Gandy, O.H. (2006). Catch 1201: A legislative history and content analysis of the DMCA Exemption Proceedings. Cardozo Arts & Entertainment Law Journal, 24(1), pp. 121–190.
- Halbert, C.H., Armstrong, K., Gandy, O.H., & Shaker, L. (2006). Racial differences in trust in health care providers. Archives of Internal Medicine, 166(8), pp. 896–901.
- Halbert, C.H., Gandy, O.H. Jr., Collier, A., & Shaker, L. (2005). Intentions to participate in genetics research among African American smokers. Cancer Epidemiology, Biomarkers and Prevention, 15(1), pp. 150–153.
- Gandy, O.H., & Li, Z. (2005). Framing comparative risk: A preliminary analysis. The Howard Journal of Communications, Vol. 16(2), pp. 71–86.
- Wray, R.J., et al. (2004). Preventing domestic violence in the African American Community: Assessing the impact of a dramatic radio serial. Journal of Health Communication, 9(1), pp. 31–52.
- Popescu, M., & Gandy, O.H. (2003). Whose environmental justice? Social identity and institutional rationality. Journal of Environmental Law and Litigation, 19(1), pp. 141–192.
- Gandy, O.H. (2003). Media education comes of age. Television & New Media, 4(4), pp. 483–493.
- Gandy, O.H. (2003) Public opinion surveys and the formation of privacy policy. Journal of Social Issues, 59(2), pp. 283–299.
- Danna, A. & Gandy, O.H. (2002). All that glitters is not gold: Digging beneath the surface of data mining. Journal of Business Ethics, 40(4), pp. 373–388.
- Gandy, O.H. (2001). Journalists and academics and the delivery of race statistics: Being a statistician means never having to say you're certain. Race and Society, 4(2), pp. 149–160.
- Gandy, O.H. (2001). Racial identity, media use, and the social construction of risk among African Americans. Journal of Black Studies, 31(5), pp. 600–618.

== Awards ==
- Gandy received the “Outstanding Achievement Award” from the Surveillance Studies Network in 2016.

== Sources ==
- Gandy, Oscar H. (2021). "Oscar H. Gandy C.V." (PDF). asc.upenn.edu.
- Ronald L. Jackson II and Sonja M. Brown Givens. Black Pioneers in Communication Research. Sage Publications, 2006.
