= Mean world syndrome =

Perceiving the world to be more dangerous than it really is

Homicide rate in the United States (blue line). It may be seen that the rate today is similar to that of the 1950s, and much lower than it was in the 1970s–80s. Nevertheless, most Americans imagine crime rates to be worse.

Homicide rate in Western Europe since 1300: again, a precipitous decline is seen.

Mean world syndrome is a proposed cognitive bias in which individuals may perceive the world as more dangerous than it actually is, potentially due to repeated exposure to violence-related media content. The concept was introduced by communications researcher George Gerbner in the 1970s and is closely associated with his cultivation theory, which examines how long-term media exposure may influence individual's perception of reality.

Originally developed through research on television viewing, mean world syndrome has also been discussed in relation to contemporary digital media, including social media and online news. Research has also explored the associations between exposure to negative news content and perceptions of societal threats, including crime and personal safety.

== Cultural Indicators Project and cultivation theory ==
In 1968, George Gerbner established the Cultural Indicators Project (CIP) to examine how television content influenced viewers' attitudes and perceptions of society. The project analyzed more than 3,000 television programs and 35,000 characters to identify patterns in television content and examine how these portrayals could shape viewer's perception of reality.

The Cultural Indicators Project contributed to the development of cultivation theory, which suggests that long-term exposure to television can influence viewers' perceptions of social reality. Gerbner's research categorized television audiences into three groups: light viewers (less than two hours daily), medium viewers (two to four hours daily), and heavy viewers (more than four hours daily). His findings suggested that heavy viewers were more likely to hold beliefs about society that reflected television portrayals rather than real-world conditions.

Cultivation theory provided the theoretical foundation for the mean world syndrome, which describes how repeated exposure to television violence may contribute to exaggerate perceptions of danger in everyday life.Gerbner proposed that individuals who frequently consumed violent television content were more likely to view the world as threatening compared to those with lower levels of exposure.

=== Research findings ===
The findings of the Cultural Indicators Project provided evidence supporting aspects of Gerbner's hypotheses about the relationship between television viewing and perceptions of social reality. Gerbner's research identified a correlation between the amount of television an individual watched and their reported fear of victimization in everyday life. Individuals who watched moderate to high levels of television tended to perceive the world as more dangerous than those who watched less television. Furthermore, viewers who consumed television at a higher rate also believed that greater protection by law enforcement is needed and reported that most people "cannot be trusted" and are "just looking out for themselves". These findings contributed to Gerbner's concerns about exposure to media violence. He stated, "The consequence of regular or heavy viewing of television is a normalization of unhealthy and violent behavior. It is a cultivation that the concept [of violence] is normal and accepted in society."

Gerbner was particularly concerned about the impact violent media was having on children. During the Cultural Indicators Project, Gerbner found that children had seen about 8,000 murders on television by the end of elementary school, and about 200,000 violent acts by the age of 18. Gerbner stated:

Our studies have shown that growing up from infancy with this unprecedented diet of violence has three consequences, which, in combination, I call the 'mean world syndrome'. What this means is that if you are growing up in a home where there is more than say three hours of television per day, for all practical purposes you live in a meaner world - and act accordingly - than your next-door neighbor who lives in the same world but watches less television. The programming reinforces the worst fears and apprehensions and paranoia of people.

In 1981, Gerbner took his findings and testified before a congressional subcommittee about the damage he believed violent media was inflicting on Americans, particularly children. "Fearful people are more dependent, more easily manipulated and controlled, more susceptible to deceptively simple, strong, tough measures and hard-line measures," he explained. Subsequent research has continued to examine the relationship between exposure to television violence and viewers' perceptions of crime, safety, and social reality, although findings and interpretations cary across studies.

== The Mean World Index ==
The findings of the cultivation theory study led Gerbner and Larry Gross to further develop it in 1976 using findings from their other large-scale research projects. Believing that those "who tell the stories of a culture really govern human behavior," Gerbner claimed that a major cultural shift was taking place, wherein those storytellers "used to be the parent, the school, the church, the community," but are now "a handful of global conglomerates that have nothing to tell, but a great deal to sell." Using the theory, Gerbner would explore the effects of TV violence-related content on the attitudes and beliefs of an individual about crime and violence in the world, which he dubbed "The Mean World Index". Since TV was becoming an ever-increasing presence in the average American household and the amount of violence on TV was growing exponentially, Gerbner conducted several large-scale studies that upheld his hypothesis: those who watched moderate to large amounts of TV believed the world to be a more dangerous place.

== Later research ==
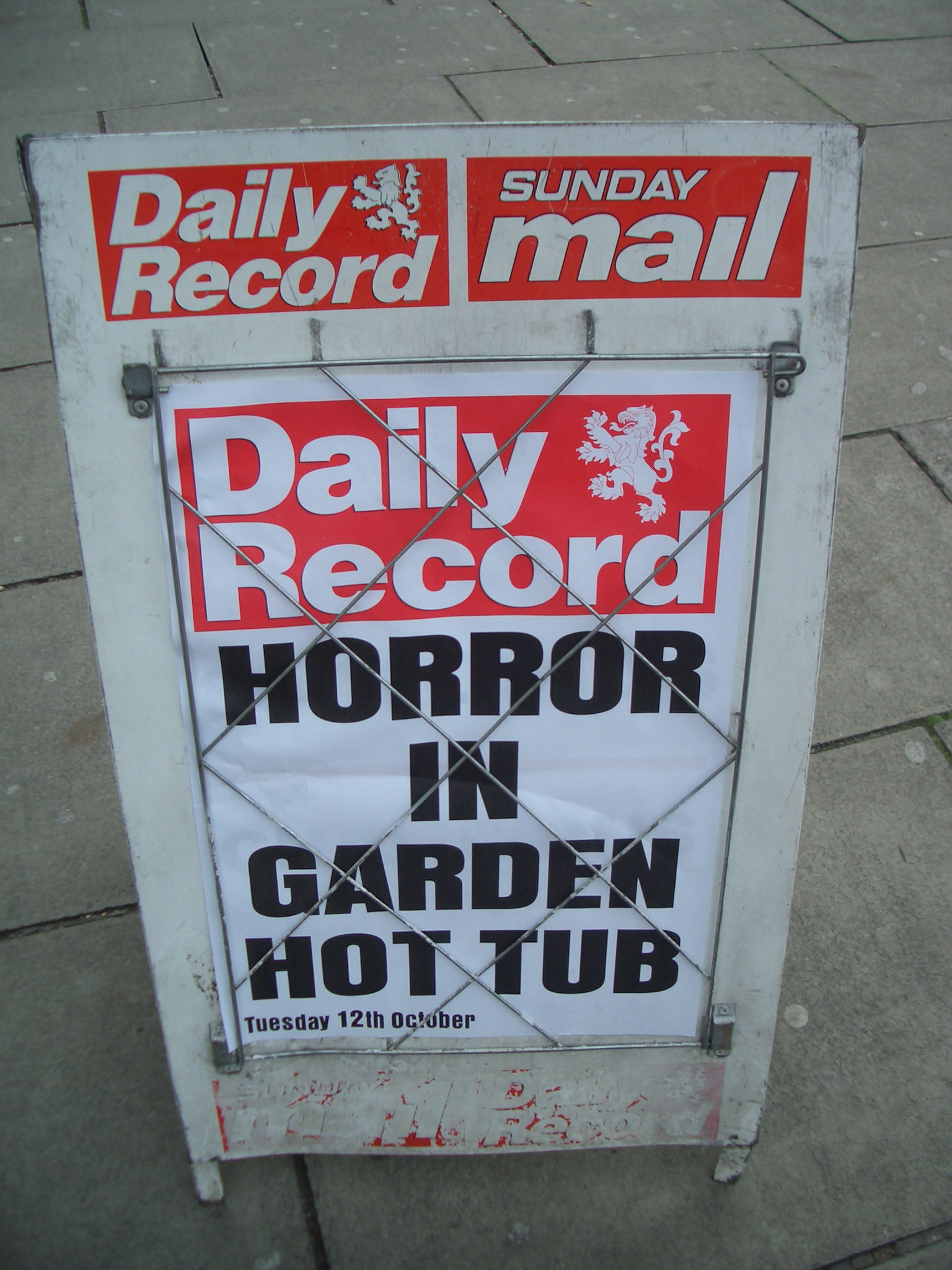
Tabloid newspaper headline in Edinburgh

Since the 1970s, numerous studies have corroborated Gerbner's findings that moderate-to-heavy viewing of violence-related content on TV increased depression, fear, anxiety, anger, pessimism, post-traumatic stress, and substance use.

In 2009, the American Academy of Pediatrics released a policy statement on media violence which concluded that "extensive research evidence indicates that media violence can contribute to aggressive behavior, desensitization to violence, nightmares, and fear of being harmed."

A study conducted in 2018 by researchers at the University of Oklahoma found that there is "good evidence establishing a relationship between disaster television viewing and various psychological outcomes."

In 2022, another research article was published by students in the Department of Psychiatry, Psychotherapy, and Early Intervention at the Medical University of Lublin, Poland, in which the researchers assessed connections between binge-watching different types of media and sociological phenomena. Researchers found that when binge-watching media, different types of violent media impacted how the viewer saw the world.

=== Evolution of mass media ===
Although Gerbner's original research focused primarily on television, cultivation theory has since been applied to other forms of mass media such as newspapers, films, and digital platform. Researchers have examined whether repeated exposure to media content across different platforms may influence individuals' perceptions of social reality, extending the theory beyond its original focus on television.

Researchers have increasingly examined how social media exposure may influence individuals' emotions and perceptions of reality. Similar to traditional television, social media platforms can expose users to repeated portrayals of violence, conflict, and other negative events. Research has explored whether exposure to this content is associated with heightened perceptions of danger and fear of crime, although these relationships may vary depending on the type of content and individual viewing habits.

=== COVID-19 and mean world syndrome ===
During the COVID-19 pandemic, the term "doomscrolling" became widely used to describe the repeated consumption of negative or distressing online content. Research conducted during the pandemic examined how exposure to negative COVID-19 news affected individuals' emotional responses, with one 2021 study reporting decreased optimism and positive emotions following even brief exposure to negative news.

Social movements such as the Black Lives Matter movement inspired new studies connecting mean world syndrome, the COVID-19 pandemic, and the Black Lives Matter movement. One study done in 2020 found that feelings of anxiety were tied to violent or troublesome news media on the Black Lives Matter movement. Another study found that images from the George Floyd protests elicited especially anxious and punitive reactions among conservative news consumers, suggesting that conservative protest coverage during the pandemic may have amplified mean world perceptions among certain audiences.

== The Mean World Syndrome documentary ==
The Mean World Syndrome: Media Violence & the Cultivation of Fear
- Directed by: Jeremy Earp
- Written by: Jeremy Earp
- Produced by: Scott Morris; Sut Jhally
- Starring: George Gerbner; Michael Morgan; Sut Jhally (interviewer)
- Edited by: Andrew Killoy
- Production company: Media Education Foundation
- Release date: 2010
- Running time: 51 mins
- Country: USA
- Language: English

In 2010, the Media Education Foundation filmed a documentary titled The Mean World Syndrome: Media Violence & the Cultivation of Fear summarizing the work of Gerbner and others about the effects of violent media on people's opinions, attitudes, and beliefs. The documentary features Gerbner himself speaking about his research on violence in media and the effects this has had on the American public since the addition of sound to television in the 1930s. The film is narrated by Michael Morgan who worked closely with Gerbner on his research about cultivation theory and mean world syndrome.

== See also ==
- Appeal to fear
- Availability heuristic
- Crime rate
- Cultivation theory
- Culture of fear
- Cognitive bias
- Deviancy amplification spiral
- Doomscrolling
- Fascination with death
- Fear, uncertainty and doubt
- For the children (politics)
- Just-world fallacy
- Missing white woman syndrome
- Negativity bias
- Sensationalism
