= Northwestern University in Qatar =

University campus in Education City, Doha, Qatar

- Arabic: جامعة نورثويسترن في قطر
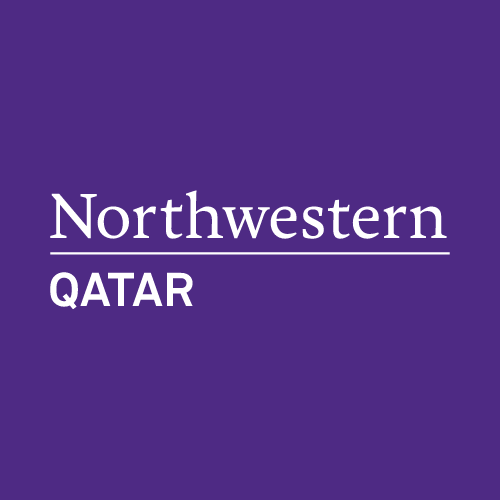
- Motto: Quaecumque sunt vera (Latin)
- Motto in English: "Whatsoever things are true" (Philippians 4:8 AV)
- Type: Private
- Established: August 10, 2008; 17 years ago
- Parent institution: Northwestern University
- President: Mung Chiang
- Provost: Erik Luijten
- Dean: Marwan M. Kraidy
- Location: Education City, Doha, Qatar
- Campus: 12th School & 3rd Campus
- Colors: Purple (official); White (unofficial)
- Nickname: Wildcats
- Mascot: Willie the Wildcat
- Website: qatar.northwestern.edu
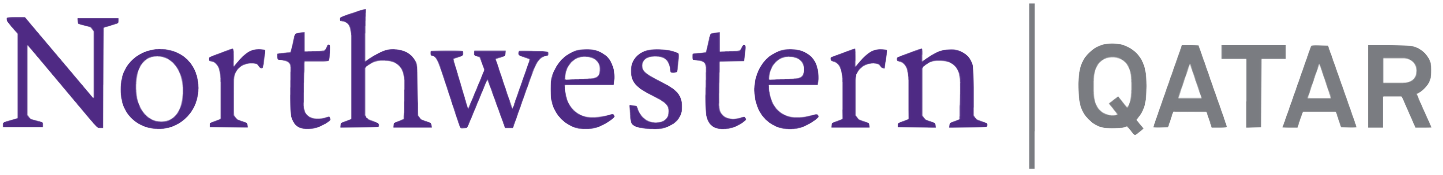

Northwestern University in Qatar (NU-Q), also known as Northwestern Qatar, is Northwestern University’s campus in Education City, Doha, Qatar, founded in partnership with the Qatar Foundation in 2008.

Northwestern Qatar's campus offers a liberal arts and media education with undergraduate degrees awarded in communication, journalism, and strategic communication.

== History ==
Having been approached in 2006 by the Qatar Foundation for Education, Science and Community Development, Northwestern agreed the following year to open its campus at Education City. The inaugural NU-Q Class of 2012 began studies in August 2008. Additional classes have been added each year, and the university has established strong ties with local organizations, partnering with media groups and collaborating with a number of regional initiatives to generate additional educational and professional opportunities for its students.

A number of notable journalists, scholars, and media professionals have addressed students and faculty at Northwestern University in Qatar, including Fareed Zakaria of CNN's Fareed Zakaria GPS; NU-Q alumni and New York Times international reporter Ismaeel Naar; journalist Evan Osnos of The New Yorker; television journalist Tim Sebastian; Iranian-American journalist Roxana Saberi; Carlos Van Meek, former head of output for Al Jazeera English; Arthur Sulzberger, publisher of the New York Times; Jeff Cole, head of the World Internet Project; Rami Khouri, editor of the Beirut Daily Star; Sophia Al Maria, author and filmmaker; documentary filmmaker Ramona S. Diaz; and AJ+ journalist Dena Takruri.

The university graduated its inaugural class in the spring of 2012. Since NU-Q's establishment, there have been a total of thirteen classes who have graduated from NU-Q (as of 2024), with the Class of 2024, with 126 graduates from 31 countries, being the largest graduating class to date.

== Academic programs ==
The curriculum leading to the award of the Bachelor of Science in Communication degree is based on that of the Northwestern University School of Communication at Northwestern's Evanston campus. Communication students at NU-Q pursue a major in Media Industries and Technologies, which combines elements of the Communication Studies and Radio/TV/Film (RTVF) majors offered at the Northwestern University home campus in the United States.

The curriculum leading to the award of the Bachelor of Science in Journalism degree draws on that of the Medill School of Journalism, Media, Integrated Marketing Communications at Northwestern's Evanston campus. This program is accredited by the Accrediting Council on Education in Journalism and Mass Communication. Liberal arts courses are provided by Northwestern's Weinberg College of Arts and Sciences.

NU-Q courses are modeled closely on those offered at Northwestern University campus in the United States, although adjustments have been made because the Qatar campus courses are taught in a 15-week semester system rather than a 10-week quarter system. Additionally, courses with particular relevance to the region are offered at NU-Q. In 2012, NU-Q secured permission from the Board of Trustees to make its own academic appointments.

Academic minors

NU-Q offers five academic minors that supplement their undergraduate programs in Communication and Journalism:

1. Strategic Communication
2. Middle East Studies
3. Film & Design
4. Media and Politics - this interdisciplinary, joint minor program shared between NU-Q and Georgetown University in Qatar (GU-Q), focuses on the interests and needs of students in a contemporary era when the distinction between politics and media is increasingly blurred.
5. Africana Studies - this second joint minor program shared between NU-Q and GU-Q, provides critical understanding of African identities and struggles both within the African continent and in global contexts.
6. Artificial Intelligence & Media

NU-Q's academic programs provide various opportunities for students to participate in international programs. Students in the Journalism and Strategic Communication Program are required to complete a junior year residency. Juniors in the Communication Program are eligible to apply for the Evanston Communication Exchange Program. Shorter international academic trips are offered at various times throughout the year. Past destinations have included Turkey, Switzerland, Italy, South Africa, France, India, and the USA.

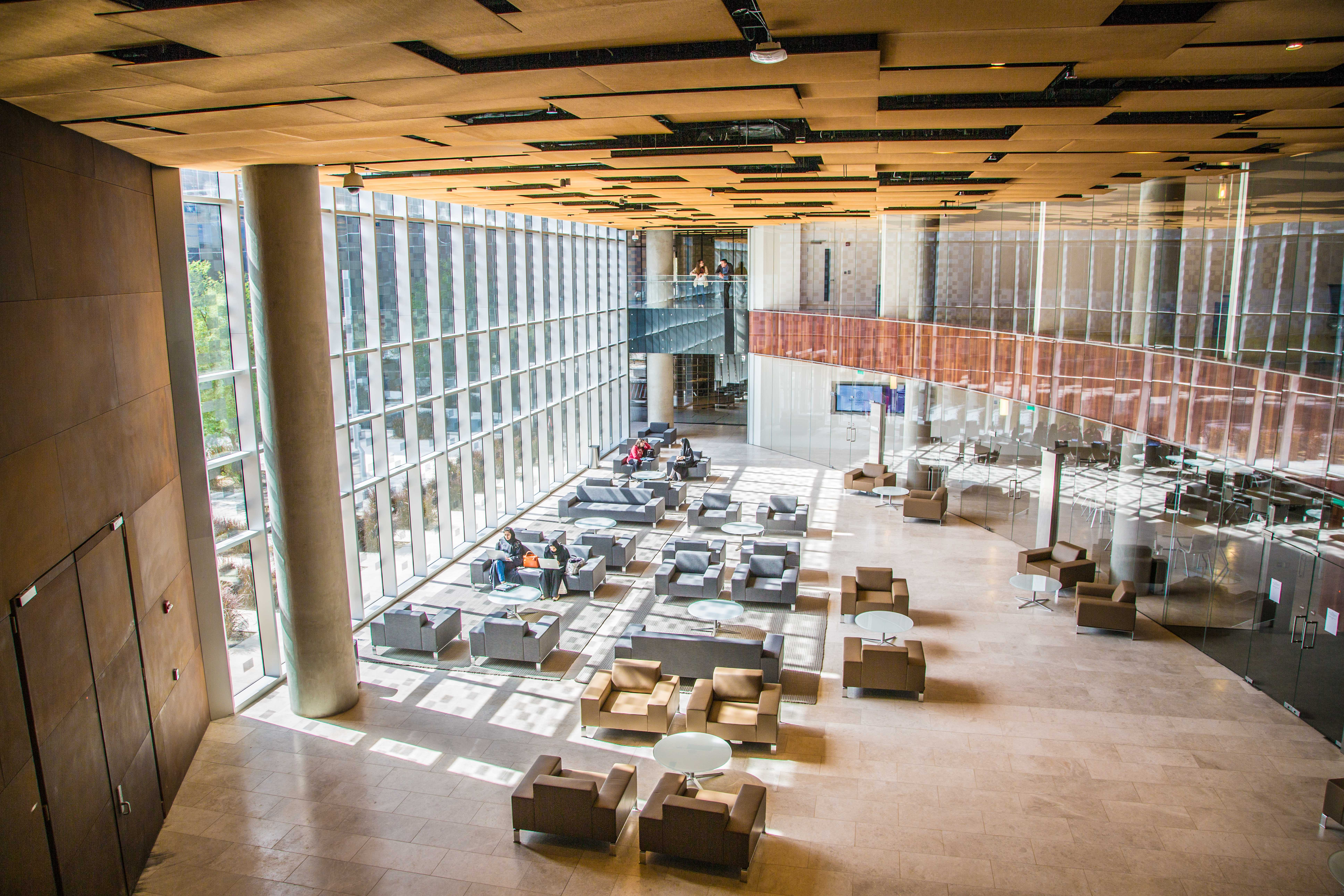
The North Atrium at Northwestern University in Qatar

NU-Q students can cross-register for courses at the five other American universities located in Education City.

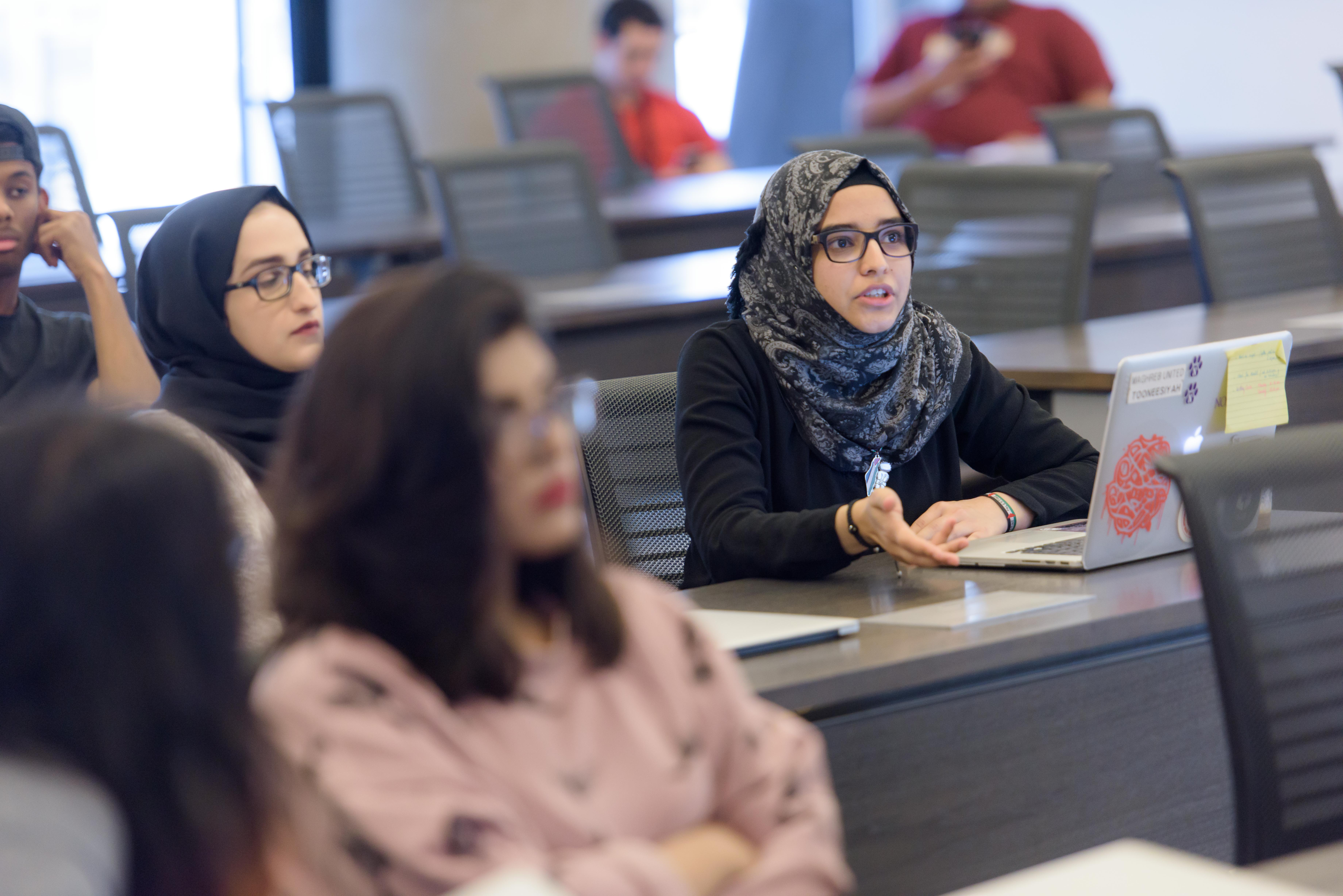
Class at Northwestern University in Qatar

Degrees awarded by Northwestern University's Qatar campus are accredited by the Higher Learning Commission of the North Central Association of Colleges and Schools.

=== Pre-college programs ===
NU-Q offers an annual summer media program to high school students combining aspects of the Journalism and Strategic Communication and Communication Programs. NU-Q also offers workshops to high school students periodically throughout the school year.

== Funding ==
Similar to other universities with campuses in Education City, Northwestern's facilities are entirely paid for by Qatar. In 2014, Northwestern received $45.3 million to run the Doha campus. Also like other Doha campuses of U.S. universities, Qatari students at Northwestern have their tuition covered by Qatar. Students of other nationalities either pay for their own tuition or can sometimes receive scholarship money. As of 2016, tuition for the school is about $52,000 per year.

== NU-Q Building & Facilities ==
NU-Q's permanent home in Education City, known as Pressdock, was designed by American architect Antoine Predock.

Northwestern moved into its permanent facility in January 2017. The four-story building is more than 500,000 square feet and has achieved a LEED Gold Certification.

The university also opened the Media Majlis Museum, the first museum in the Arab world dedicated to exploring the content of media, journalism, and communication, and is Qatar's first university museum. Located on the NU-Q campus, the bilingual (Arabic and English) museum features interactive exhibitions, discussion programs, and other projects examining media, journalism, and communication through global, regional, and local/Qatar lenses. Its inaugural exhibit examines a century's worth of film history as shaped by notions of Arab identity. The Media Majlis Museum offers free admission to students, faculty, and the public, with new exhibitions opening each semester of the academic year.

== Research & Fellowship ==
In 2013, NU-Q launched the school's signature research project, an annual survey of media use in the MENA region. Media Use in the Middle East in 2013, 2014, 2015, 2016, and 2017, as well the report, Media Industries in the Middle East, 2016, revealed regional attitudes about government censorship, press freedom, the morality of content, entertainment preferences, and overall consumption habits, as well as provided an overview of the most prevalent business models across the MENA media landscape. NU-Q's research has been cited by academic institutions and think tanks (e.g., USC Annenberg School Center for the Digital Future, Brookings Institution) as well as news media outlets (e.g., Christian Science Monitor, CNN, The Atlantic, Al Jazeera, Al-Arabiya) around the world.

In 2022, NU-Q launched the school's flagship research institute, the Institute for Advanced Study of the Global South (#IAS_NUQ), a multidisplinary research institute that produces and promotes evidence-based storytelling focused on the histories, cultures, societies, and media of the Global South. The Institute awards 16 Global Undergraduate Fellowships annually, and students present their work to the University community at the end of their fellowship, usually at the end of January of the year after they are selected. In addition, the Institute awards Global Fellowships for postdoctoral and graduate scholars, as well as faculty grants. #IAS_NUQ hosts various conferences, lectures, colloquia & seminar series, supported through grants from institutions such as the Carnegie Corporation of New York.

In 2024, in line with Northwestern University's Presidential Priority to harness the power of data analytics and artificial intelligence, and in collaboration with Qatar Foundation’s emphasis on AI as a priority area for Education City, NU-Q launched the Artificial Intelligence Initiative (AI²), a new strategic flagship initiative focused on meeting the global challenges of artificial intelligence and making decisive contributions to research, teaching, and professional development in that area. As part of the initiative, NU-Q launched the Artificial Intelligence and Media Lab (AIM Lab), which will drive research efforts on AI and gather faculty members, a postdoctoral scholar, and undergraduate researchers to collaborate on research and organize events. The AIM Lab launched the Advanced Undergraduate Research on Robots and AI (AURORA) Grant in 2025, with three inaugural grantees.

== Student Life at NU-Q ==
Approximately half the student body is Qatari; however, over 32 nationalities are represented across the student body. There are about 300 students enrolled in the school. NU-Q has worked to integrate western values into its Qatar campus. For example, there are many female students that attend NU-Q. There have been some concerns that this integration, which is not as common in Qatar, may be somewhat difficult to implement, as Qatar adheres to Salafism.

NU-Q students have access to the full range of student activities offered to all Education City students, including Multaqa (the Education City Student Center), Recreation Center, clubs, organizations, and athletic leagues.

NU-Q is the host of many film and production related events, such as THIMUN Qatar Northwestern Film Festival, the Studio 20Q Annual Premiere, and the NU-Q Media & Research Awards. Students also participate in a wide variety of leadership, service, and experiential learning initiatives both in Doha and internationally. In addition, students have access to and participate in a range of athletics, activities, and clubs.

=== Students in the field ===
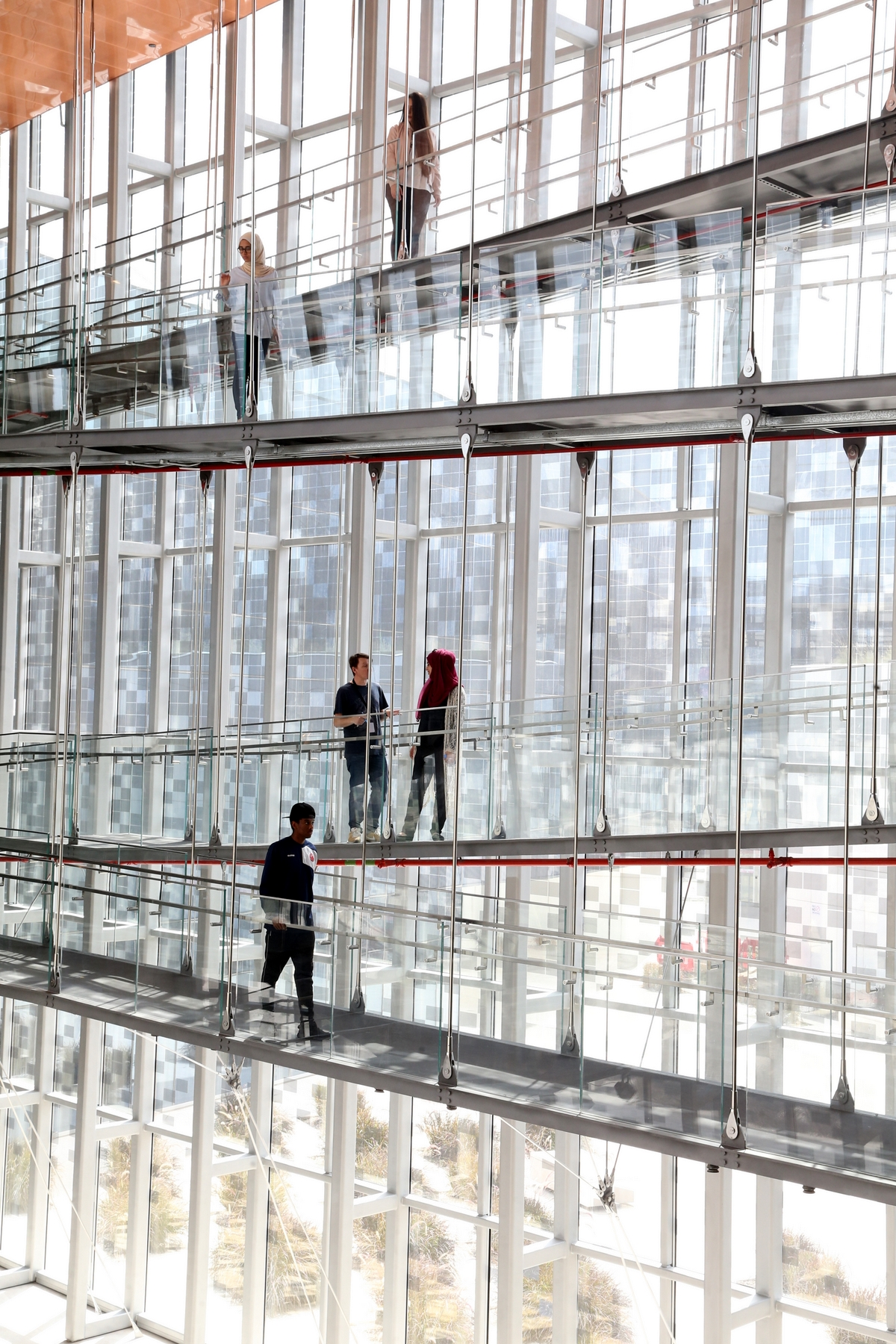
The sloping ramps in the Forum at Northwestern University in Qatar

Students have tackled subjects that are considered controversial in Qatar and throughout the Middle East. One NU-Q graduate was nominated for a Student Academy Award for his film 100 Steps, which tells the story of a young boy in Pakistan who finds that his local religious school has served as a front for a radical extremists’ recruitment camp. Convict of 302, a documentary by two NU-Q students about Pakistan's death penalty and anti-terrorism laws, screened at a consortium sponsored by the Pulitzer Center on Crisis Reporting in Washington, DC.

Students have also written stories about working conditions at local development sites in Qatar, domestic abuse, and women's issues.

Another NU-Q graduate, Ismaeel Naar, was named Outstanding Young Arab Journalist of the year in 2016.

Evanston Communication Exchange Program

Students who are pursuing the Bachelor of Science degree in Communication can apply to participate in the Evanston Communication Exchange Program (more commonly known as Comm Exchange), and if selected, spend the spring semester of their junior year studying at Northwestern's home campus in Evanston, Illinois, US, located near Chicago.

Journalism residency (JR)

Journalism juniors spend ten weeks working in a professional organization somewhere around the world. Assignments have included Euronews, Rest of World, the Committee to Protect Journalists, Al Jazeera, Financial Times, National Geographic, Huffington Post, Grayling Public Relations, VICE News, Qatar Foundation International, and Vogue. The goal of the Journalism Residency is for students to get the kinds of hands-on experience that help them develop new skills, test old skills, work under deadline pressure, hone their news judgment, sharpen their fact-checking and research skills, build confidence in their capabilities, and explore new career paths not previously considered. This is a required component of the B.S. in Journalism degree program.

Semester in Qatar (SiQ)

The Semester in Qatar program is an intercampus program, offering Evanston students the opportunity to study at Northwestern's campus in Qatar. Northwestern undergrads studying at School of Communication, Medill, and Weinberg are eligible to apply and participate in the program, which takes place during NU-Q's Fall Semester (usually late August-early December).

Academic trips

This program is open to NU-Q students and assists them with learning about how organizations work in other countries. Previous trips have included Turkey, Switzerland, Italy, the United Kingdom, and the United States.

Service Learning Experience (SLE) & Global Media Experience (GME)

NU-Q students can participate in annual Spring Break Service Learning Experience trips to global destinations. The goal of the trips are to connect students to the needs of the larger worldwide community, provide insight and understanding of the historical and socio-political context of the visited country, and build a strong sense of global citizenship and commitment. Students complete assigned projects and reflections as part of the experience. Trip destinations have included Cambodia, Laos, Malaysia, Brazil, China, India, Morocco, South Africa, Tunisia, Zambia, and more.

The Global Media Program (GME) enables NU-Q students to engage with individuals at a variety of well-established media corporations, as well as up-and-coming startups, to better understand the dynamic nature of the media industry. GME aims to create a platform where students can network and sharpen their employability skills and explore the regional job market.

== University Leadership ==
The leadership of NU-Q is appointed by the Provost of Northwestern University (currently Kathleen Hagerty), in consultation with the Qatar Foundation.

The founding Dean & CEO of NU-Q was Dr. John D. Margolis, an associate provost at Northwestern University who served from 2008 to 2011, who was succeeded by Dr. Everette E. Dennis from 2011 to 2020.

The current Dean & CEO of NU-Q is Marwan M. Kraidy. S. Venus Jin is the associate dean for education, Zachary Wright is the associate dean for faculty, Maria Lombard is the assistant dean for academic affairs, and Alex Schultes is the assistant dean for the student experience. Rana Kazkaz is director of the Communication Program, Ilhem Allagui is director of the Journalism & Strategic Communication Program, and Sami Hermez is the director of the Liberal Arts program.

The NU-Q staff provide the range of support services expected in an American college or university, including professionally staffed offices for admissions, academic and personal counseling, student activities, student records, human resources, finance, and marketing/public relations. The collections of the professionally staffed NU-Q library focus on media issues, and students and faculty also have access to all electronic resources available at the Northwestern University Evanston campus and to the services of inter-library loan. A production facilities department provides support for the media-intensive work of students and faculty at NU-Q.

== Faculty ==
There are 44 faculty members at NU-Q. Many of the faculty and instructors at NU-Q are not tenured which puts some limits on academic freedom for the professors. This leaves these professors answerable to the dean & CEO of NU-Q, a situation that is not dissimilar to faculty members at Northwestern's Evanston Campus. In Qatar, however, a report by Stephen Eiesenman, former president of Northwestern Faculty Senate, pointed out that the dean has much more authority than in the United States. Additionally, if a faculty member is no longer employed by NU-Q, they must leave the country, forcing them to uproot their lives there, a situation which no doubt puts pressure on the faculty member to work within the confines of a more limited set of academic and intellectual freedoms. Additionally, faculty members at NU-Q are not eligible for tenure unless they are visiting from the Evanston or Chicago campuses.

== Community ==
Northwestern's community is very vibrant. In addition to its core mission of providing undergraduate education to its students, NU-Q seeks to serve as a regional center for issues related to communication and journalism. Often in collaboration with local, regional, or international organizations, NU-Q sponsors seminars and colloquia on topics related to the media. NU-Q also sponsors short, non-credit programs for pre-college students, which are designed to expose them to developments in media.

Outside of the NU-Q and Education City communities, freedom of speech is highly limited and anyone who threatened “social values” or Qatar's “general order” through any forms of news, photos, videos or audio recordings can be sentenced to prison. A report by the former president of the Northwestern University Faculty Senate conducted during his tenure as president highlighted that these implicit community values seem to be ingrained in the students, who seemed to willingly comply with these restrictions both intentionally and unintentionally.

== Institutional Partnerships ==
As a Partner Institution of Qatar Foundation, NU-Q has undertaken several initiatives in media education and community outreach. In 2013, NU-Q began the biannual Qatar Media Industries Forum (QMIF), bringing together top representatives in publishing, electronic media, digital media, public relations and advertising to discuss and assess the present and future of Qatar's media landscape. In 2012, the school also established separate Institutional Partnerships with the Doha Film Institute. the Al Jazeera Network., and the Qatar Computer Research Institute.

NU-Q quietly ended its institutional partnership with the Al Jazeera Network in 2024.

== Criticisms ==
Northwestern University has come under fire for opening a campus in Qatar for various reasons including the country's poor human rights record, which was particularly scrutinized in the years leading up to the 2022 World Cup. According to a UNHCR assessment from March 2022, Qatar had undergone significant legal and institutional changes to reinforce its human rights protections.

=== Freedom of speech ===
Concerns have been raised over whether journalism can be taught effectively in a country with limited freedom of expression and where reports of censorship arise from time to time. Additionally, some members of Northwestern's faculty have expressed "dissatisfaction with the academic and free speech protections". In an interview with the Washington Post, former Northwestern Faculty Senate President, Stephen Eisenman, said that "teaching journalism as an enterprise in which you must first learn what not to ask, is no kind of journalism instruction at all" and continued that at NU-Q this was "likely a matter of encouraging some enquiries and making others strange, awkward, rude or unserious".

In an article by The Washington Post, Susan Dun, an assistant professor of communication at NU-Q said that some professors do exercise caution with statements, written work, or speeches that may reach a wider audience than just the Education City community.

Mohanalakashmi Rajakumar, who taught English at Northwestern, VCU and Georgetown in Qatar published a book called Love Comes Later that was banned by Qatar in 2015 with no clear explanation due to the country's strict censorship policies.

Students at Northwestern have said that they face challenges due to the lack of first amendment rights protecting the media. Students have been harassed and intimidated when trying to capture images that would be considered routine or not offensive in the U.S. Some faculty members maintain that this teaches students persistence and creativity in overcoming obstacles to report on a story.

Everette Dennis, the former dean of NU-Q, led a six-nation survey in 2015 that was financed by the Qatar National Research Fund and asked questions such as if people think their country is "headed in the right direction". While the UAE, Egypt, Tunisia, Lebanon and Saudi Arabia all had answers to the question, there was no data from Qatar as the government blocked the question from being asked to survey participants.

== See also ==
- List of universities and colleges in Qatar
