= Everette Dennis =

Everette E. Dennis
- Born: August 15, 1942 (age 84); Seattle, Washington
- Occupations: Professor, media expert, author, academic administrator and organization executive

Academic background
- Education: Bachelor of Science in Journalism and Political Science; Master of Arts in Communication; Doctor of Philosophy in Mass Communication; Post-doctoral Fellowships in Law and Public Affairs
- Alma mater: University of Oregon; Syracuse University; University of Minnesota

Everette E. Dennis (born August 15, 1942) is an American media expert, author, academic administrator and organization executive.

He is a former Dean and chief executive officer at Northwestern University in Qatar. Since 2021, he has been professor emeritus in the Medill School at Northwestern University, Evanston, Illinois and since 2011, Felix E. Larkin Distinguished Professor emeritus in Fordham's Graduate School of Business in New York City.

Dennis is most known for his contributions to journalism, media, higher education, and international relations.

Inducted as a fellow in the American Academy of Arts & Sciences in 2017, recognized for "a career that traversed media, higher education, and international relations, he has been a recognized leader known for advancing the study of communication and media for public benefit."

He is also an elected life member of the Council on Foreign Relations and the American Antiquarian Society and a member of the Century Association and the Harvard Club of New York City. He is a recipient of the 2004 Trayes Award and a 2001 inductee in the Hall of Achievement from the University of Oregon

== Early life ==
Dennis was born in Seattle, WA on August 15, 1942, to Kathryn M. (Platt) Dennis and Everette E. Dennis Sr. His father was in the US Army Air Corps, and his mother a legal secretary and homemaker, both fourth generation Oregonians from pioneer families. During World War II, they lived in several California cities before returning to Portland, OR in 1945. They eventually settled in Toledo, OR where Everette and his five siblings were raised.

Dennis attended Toledo High School where he was editor of the high-school newspaper, The Boomerang, and worked after school as a printer's devil at the Lincoln County Leader.

== Early career and education ==
Dennis was the editor of the Oregon Daily Emerald while getting his B.S in the University of Oregon (UO) in 1964. He earned his master's degree in communication at Syracuse University and earned his Ph.D. at the University of Minnesota before working as public information officer for state mental health agencies in New York and Illinois. He then served on the faculty at Kansas State University from 1968 to 1972, with short-term appointments at University of Oregon and Northwestern University.

== Career ==
He served as dean and professor at the School of Journalism and Communication at UO from 1981 to 1984. Dennis was also the Founding Executive Director of the Media Studies Center at Columbia University and the director of graduate studies in mass communication at University of Minnesota.

Prior to joining Northwestern University in Qatar in June 2011, he was the Felix E. Larkin Distinguished Professor of Communication and Media Management at Fordham Graduate School of Business in New York City while simultaneously as founding president of the American Academy in Berlin and executive director of the International Longevity Center.

From 2011 to 2020 he was Dean and chief executive officer at NU-Q, while also holding a professorship at NU's Medill School of Journalism and in the School of Communication.

== Personal life ==
Dennis married Emily Thompson Smith on June 15, 1988, at the Cathedral of St. John the Divine in New York City, officiated by the Very Reverend James Parks Morton, dean of the cathedral.

Emily, an award-winning journalist and author, was the editor for science, technology, and environment at BusinessWeek magazine. A compilation of her writings is in Emily Thompson Smith, Environmental Journalist (Portland, OR Cedar House Media, 2026). She died on August 27, 2021, in Vienna, Austria.

== Works ==
Dennis, Everette E., and Klaus Schoenbach. Trust in the US News Media. Report. Northwestern Medill-Harris Poll, 2020.

—and John V. Pavlik, Rachel Davis Mersey, Justin Gengler. Mobile Disruptions in the Middle East. Routledge, 2018.

—and Justin D. Martin, with Robb Wood, Marium Saeed, Elizabeth A. Lance, and Fouad Hassan. Media Use in the Middle East: A Seven-Nation Survey. Report. Northwestern University in Qatar, 2013–2019. https://www.mideastmedia.org/index.php. (Seven years of longitudinal studies with yearly printed reports; results also posted in interactive format on the Media Use website.)

— and William L. Rivers. Other Voices: The New Journalism in America. Transaction, 2011. First published 1974 by Canfield Press of Harper & Row.

— and Melvin L. DeFleur. Understanding Media in the Digital Age. Allyn & Bacon, 2010.

— and Melvin L. DeFleur. Understanding Mass Communication. Houghton Mifflin, 1981. Subsequent editions published in 1985, 1988, 1991,1994, 1996, 1998, and 2002.

— and John C. Merrill. Media Debates: Issues in Mass Communication. Longman, 1991. Subsequent edition published by Longman Publishers in 1996.

— and John C. Merrill. Media Debates: Great Issues for the Digital Age. Thomson Wadsworth, 2002. Subsequent edition published in 2006.

— and Sharon P. Smith. Finding the Best Business School. Praeger, 2006.

— The Magic Writing Machine: Student Probes of the New Journalism. University of Oregon School of Journalism, 1971.

— The Media Society: Evidence About Mass Communication in America. William C. Brown Publishers, 1978.

— and Donald M. Gillmor, David L. Grey. Justice Hugo Black & the First Amendment. Iowa State University Press, 1978.

— and Donald Gillmor, Arnold Ismach. Enduring Issues in Mass Communication. West, 1978.

— and Arnold Ismach. Reporting Processes and Practices. Wadsworth, 1981.

—and George Hage, Arnold Ismach, Stephen Hartgen. New Strategies for Public Affairs Reporting. Prentice-Hall, 1976. Second edition published in 1983.

—and Donald M. Gillmor, Theodore Glasser. Media Freedom and Accountability. Greenwood, 1989.

— and Eli M. Noam. The Cost of Libel. Columbia University Press, 1989.

— Reshaping the Media. Sage, 1989.

—and George Gerbner, Yassin Zassoursky. Beyond the Cold War. Sage Publications, 1991.

—and Craig LaMay. Media and The Environment. Island Press, 1991.

—and Craig LaMay, Edward Pease. Publishing Books. Transaction, 1992.

— Of Media and People. Sage, 1992.

— and John V. Pavlik. Demystifying Media Technology. Mayfield Publishing Co, 1993.

— and Craig LaMay. Higher Education in the Information Age. Transaction, 1993.

— and Craig LaMay. America’s Schools and the Mass Media. Transaction, 1993.

— and Craig LaMay. Radio: The Forgotten Medium. Transaction, 1995.

— and Craig LaMay. The Culture of Crime. Transaction, 1995.

— and Edward C. Pease. Children and the Media. Transaction, 1996.

— and Ellen Wartella. American Communication Research: The Remembered History. Lawrence Erlbaum Associates, 1996.

— and Michael Dertouzos, Robert Nozick, Anthony Smith. La Sociedad de la Información. Editorial Complutense, 1996.

— and Edward Pease. The Media in Black and White. Transaction, 1997.

— and Robert Snyder. Media and Public Life. Transaction, 1997.

— and Robert Snyder. Covering Congress. Transaction, 1998.

— and Robert Snyder. Media & Democracy. Transaction, 1998.

Other Studies and International Monographs

Dennis, Everette E., and Jon Vanden Heuvel. Emerging Voices: East European Media in Transition. Gannett Center, Columbia University, October 1990.

— and David Stebenne, Dirk Smillie, John Pavlik, Craig LaMay, Martha FitzSimon, Shirley Gaszi. The Media at War. Freedom Forum Center, Columbia University, 1991.

— and Research Group of the Freedom Forum Media Studies Center. The Media and Campaign ’92. Freedom Forum Center, Columbia University, 1992. (A collection of four monographs: “Covering the Presidential Primaries,” “An Uncertain Season: Reporting in the Postprimary Period,” “The Homestretch: New Politics, New Media, New Voters?” “The Finish Line: Covering the Campaign’s Final Days.”)

— and Jon Vanden Heuvel. The Unfolding Lotus: East Asia's Changing Media. Freedom Forum Center, Columbia University, 1993.

— and Jon Vanden Heuvel. Changing Patterns: Latin America's Vital Media. Freedom Forum Center, Columbia University, 1995.
