= Annenberg School for Communication at the University of Pennsylvania =

Communication school at University of Pennsylvania

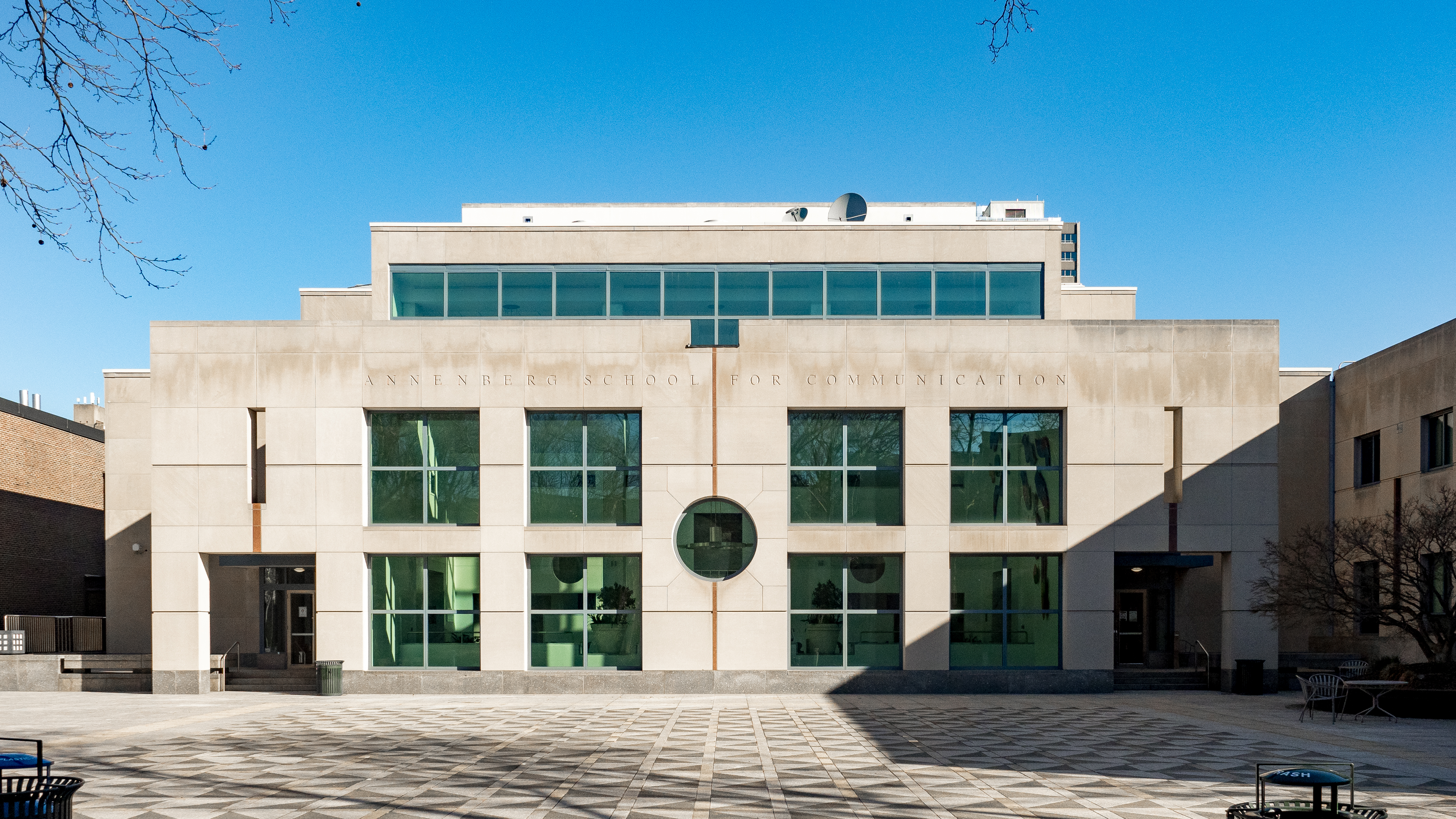
- Type: Private
- Established: 1958
- Parent institution: University of Pennsylvania
- Affiliations: University of Pennsylvania
- President: J. Larry Jameson
- Dean: Sarah Banet-Weiser
- Academic staff: 23
- Administrative staff: 70
- Students: 80
- Postgraduates: 20
- Doctoral students: 81
- Location: 3620 Walnut Street, Philadelphia, Pennsylvania, United States
- Campus: Urban
- Colors: Red and Blue
- Nickname: Quakers
- Website: asc.upenn.edu

The Annenberg School for Communication is the communication school at the University of Pennsylvania. The school was established in 1958 by Wharton School alumnus Walter Annenberg as the Annenberg School of Communications. The name was changed to its current title in 1990.

== History ==
Walter Annenberg founded the Annenberg School of Communication at the University of Pennsylvania in 1958. The school, whose first class began in 1959, was initially a master's-only program. The first Annenberg students were admitted in the Fall semester of 1959 and graduated in the Spring semester of 1960.

Gilbert Seldes was the first dean at the school, serving from 1959 until 1963. George Gerbner, an advisor to communications commissions and a major contributor to cultivation theory, became dean in 1964. He founded the Cultural Indicators Project in 1967, measuring trends in television content and how it shaped perceptions of society. The Annenberg School launched its doctoral program in 1968. The school retained ownership of the Journal of Communication from 1974 to 1991, which was published by Penn while Gerbner was editor. Dean George Gerbner held the post until 1989.

Kathleen Hall Jamieson was dean from 1989 to 2003. In 1989, the Annenberg School and Oxford University Press published the four-volume International Encyclopedia of Communications, the first broad-based attempt to survey the entire communication field. In 1990, the school changed its name to Annenberg School for Communication. During Jamieson's deanship, the school received two large endowments from the Annenberg Foundation. In 1993, Walter and Leonore Annenberg, through their foundation, granted Penn $120 million to endow the school and establish the Annenberg Public Policy Center. In 2002, the Annenberg Foundation gave $100 million to the school for scholarships, faculty chairs, and classroom refurbishment. Also during this time, the Annenberg School ended its master's program, with prospective students only being able to apply to their doctoral program.

After Jamieson stepped down as dean in 2003, the school named Michael X. Delli Carpini to the position. In 2017, after leaving the Obama Administration, former Vice President and future President of the United States Joe Biden became the Benjamin Franklin Presidential Practice Professor at the Annenberg School, and also joined the Annenberg Public Policy Center and the Penn Biden Center for Diplomacy and Global Engagement, which is a research center principally focused on diplomacy, foreign policy, and national security, in Washington, D.C. Dean Michael X. Delli Carpini's term was extended until 2018. In 2019, John Jackson became the new dean at Annenberg. In 2024, while in office, President Joe Biden expressed his desire to return to the Penn Biden Center for Diplomacy and Global Engagement after leaving the White House.

== Academics ==
Annenberg School's faculty and staff primarily work in the following core research areas:

- Activism, communication and social justice
- Communication neuroscience
- Critical journalism studies
- Culture and communication
- Digital media and social networks
- Global and comparative communication
- Health communication
- Media and communication effects
- Media institutions and systems
- Political communication
- Visual communication

Annenberg School offers a five-year doctoral program. Annenberg also offers a joint doctoral degree in communication and political science. The school hosts postdoctoral fellowships and visiting scholars.

=== Notable faculty ===
- Kathleen Hall Jamieson, professor of Communication, Director of the Annenberg Public Policy Center, and former Dean of the Annenberg School for Communication
- Michael X. Delli Carpini, professor of Communication, and former Dean of the Annenberg School for Communication
- John L. Jackson Jr., Provost of the University of Pennsylvania, and former Dean of the Annenberg School for Communication
- Duncan J. Watts, Stevens University Professor and Penn Integrates Knowledge (PIK) University Professor
- Emily Falk, professor of Communication
- Julia Ticona, professor of Communication
- Carolyn Marvin, professor of Communication
- Oscar H. Gandy Jr. (retired, 2006), Herbert Schiller professor of Communication studies
- Elihu Katz, American-Israeli sociologist, and winner of the UNESCO-Canada McLuhan Prize
- Klaus Krippendorff, professor for cybernetics, and creator of the Krippendorff's Alpha coefficient
- Monroe Price, media scholar, and former Dean of the Benjamin N. Cardozo School of Law
- Richard J. Stonesifer, President of Monmouth University
- Christopher Yoo, professor of Law, Communication and Computer Information Science
- David Eisenhower, director of the Institute for Public Service
- Amy Gutmann, former President of the University of Pennsylvania and United States Ambassador to Germany

== See also ==
- USC Annenberg School for Communication and Journalism
