= Shrum =

Shrum is a surname. Notable people with the surname include:

- Bob Shrum (born 1943), American political consultant
- Gordon Shrum (1896–1985), Canadian physicist and first chancellor of Simon Fraser University
- John Shrum (1935–1995), American television art director
- Pete Shrum (1931–1993), American murder victim
