= Journal of Consumer Affairs =

Peer-reviewed academic journal

- Discipline: Business
- Language: English
- Edited by: Ronald Paul Hill

Publication details
- History: 1967–present
- Publisher: Wiley-Blackwell on behalf of the American Council on Consumer Interests (United States)
- Frequency: Triannually
- Impact factor: 1.860 (2017)

Standard abbreviations
- ISO 4: J. Consum. Aff.

Indexing
- ISSN: 0022-0078 (print); 1745-6606 (web)

Links
- Journal homepage; Online access; Online archive; Journal page on society's website

The Journal of Consumer Affairs is a peer-reviewed academic journal that was established in 1967 and is published by Wiley-Blackwell on behalf of the American Council on Consumer Interests. It covers research on consumer behavior, consumer and household decision making, and the implications of practices and policies on consumers' wellbeing. According to the Journal Citation Reports, the journal has a 2017 impact factor of 1.860.
