= Remembering Gene Wilder =

2023 film

- Theatrical release poster
- Directed by: Ron Frank
- Written by: Glenn Kirschbaum
- Produced by: Julie Nimoy; David Knight
- Edited by: Ron Frank
- Production company: Health Point Productions
- Release date: May 18, 2023 (Los Angeles Jewish Film Festival)
- Running time: 92 minutes
- Country: United States
- Language: English
- Box office: $165,708

Remembering Gene Wilder is a 2023 American biographical documentary film about Gene Wilder's life and career, as well as his battle with Alzheimer's disease. It was directed by Ron Frank and executive produced by Julie Nimoy and David Knight.

== Synopsis ==
With rare home videos and scenes from Wilder's films, the documentary looks at the life and career of actor, writer, and director, Gene Wilder. It includes interviews with former cast and crew members as well as personal memories from family and friends, who share their love for his comedic genius. Among them are Mel Brooks, Wilder's wife, Karen Wilder, Alan Alda, Carol Kane, Harry Connick Jr., Mike Medavoy, Rain Pryor, Dick Cavett, Eric McCormack, Ben Mankiewicz, and Peter Ostrum.

== Production ==
The idea for the film stemmed from Wilder's friendship with Leonard Nimoy, which began when Nimoy directed Wilder in Funny About Love, in 1990.

Producers Julie Nimoy and David Knight saw a press release announcing that Karen Wilder was partnering with the Alzheimer's Association to raise awareness about the disease that ended her husband's life. Nimoy and Knight had produced the 2017 documentary, Remembering Leonard Nimoy, and suggested the idea of a similar film to honor Wilder. Karen Wilder supported the project and granted the filmmakers access to personal photos and home movies from the estate to incorporate into the film.

Wilder's narration, also part of the film, is taken from the audiobook version of his 2005 memoir, Kiss Me Like a Stranger: My Search for Love and Art.

Production was delayed due to the COVID-19 pandemic, but the filmmakers were finally able to interview Mel Brooks, whose participation Knight said "made the difference" in the final film.

== Release ==
The film made its world premiere at the Los Angeles Jewish Film Festival in May 2023 and won the Audience Favorite and Best Film Awards.

In January 2024, Kino Lorber acquired all rights worldwide to the film and planned a theatrical release in March 2024, followed by home video, non-theatrical, and digital releases. The documentary made its streaming debut on Netflix in June 2024.

The producers acknowledge their mutual support with the Alzheimer's Association and the BrightFocus Foundation.

== Reception ==
On the review aggregator website Rotten Tomatoes, 88% of 40 critics' reviews are positive, with an average rating of 7.3/10. The website's consensus reads: "Remembering Gene Wilder presents an affectionate portrait of a brilliant artist that entertains even as it hews to standard documentary conventions." Metacritic, which uses a weighted average, assigned the film a score of 61 out of 100, based on eight critics, indicating "generally favorable" reviews.

=== Awards ===
The film's awards include several film festival recognitions, including:

- Best Film and Audience Favorite at the Los Angeles Jewish Film Festival (2023)
- Best Overall Documentary (tie) at the Newport Beach Film Fest (2023)
- Audience Award at the Boston Jewish Film Festival (2023)
- Best Documentary Feature at the Philadelphia Jewish Film Festival (2023)
- Audience Choice Award for Best Documentary at the Seattle Jewish Film Festival (2024)
- Audience Award Best Documentary Feature at the San Diego International Jewish Film Festival (2024)
- Audience Award for Best Feature at the Milwaukee Film Festival (2024)
- Best Documentary Feature at the Boca International Jewish Film Festival (2024)
