= Nimoy =

Nimoy is a surname, and may refer to:

- Adam Nimoy (born 1956), American television director
- Jeff Nimoy, American voice actor and writer
- Jonah Nimoy (born 1992), American punk rock musician
- Julie Nimoy (born 1955), American film producer and director
- Leonard Nimoy (1931–2015), American actor and director, originated the role of Spock in Star Trek
