= Leonard Nimoy filmography =

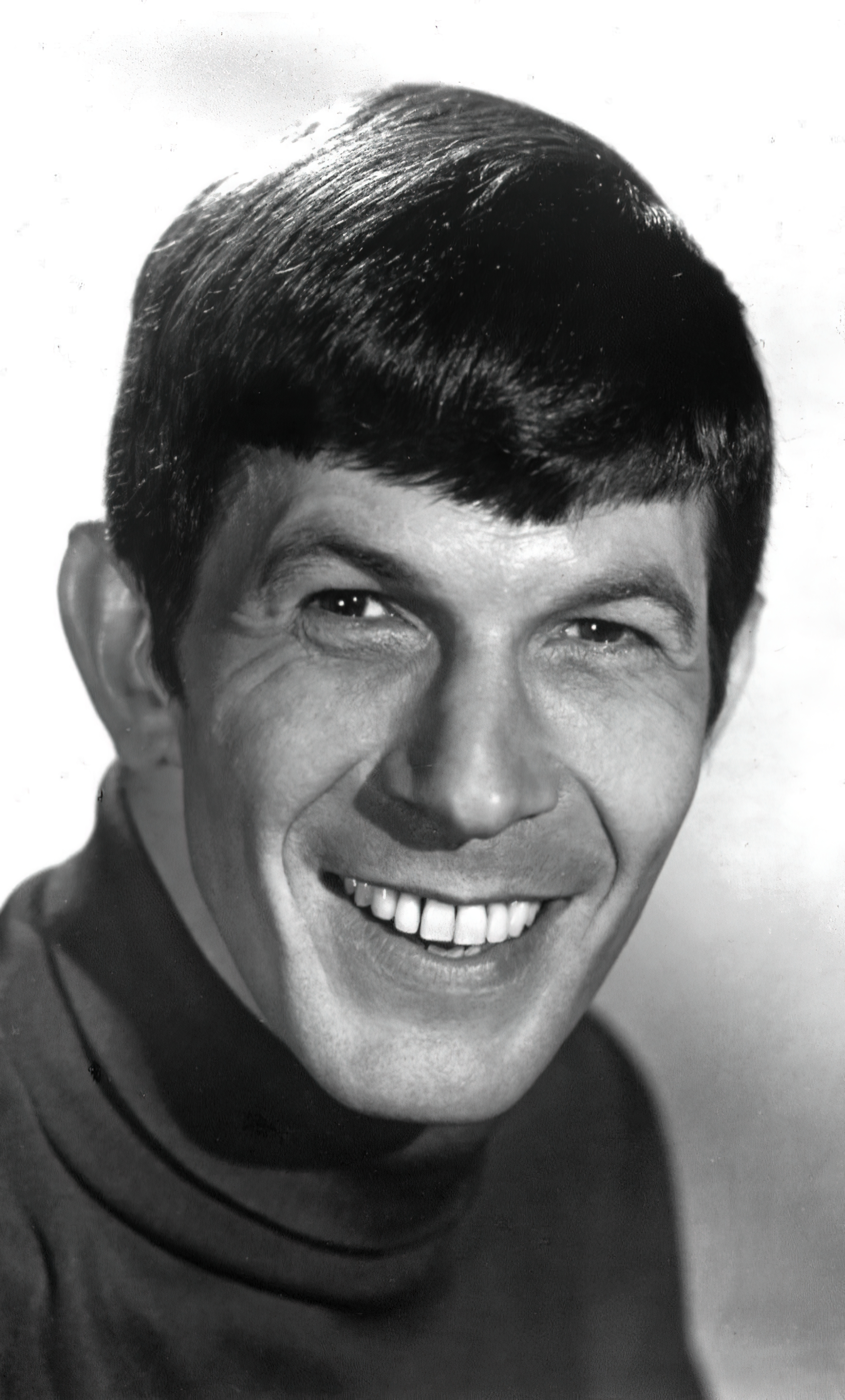

Leonard Nimoy (March 26, 1931 – February 27, 2015) was an American actor who had a career in film and television for seven decades. Nimoy's breakthrough role was his portrayal of Spock in Star Trek.

Nimoy began his acting career in his early twenties, teaching acting classes in Hollywood and making minor film and television appearances through the 1950s. In 1952, he played the title role in Kid Monk Baroni. From 1959 to 1962 he appeared in four episodes of Wagon Train. Foreshadowing his fame as a semi-alien, he played Narab, one of three Martian invaders, in the 1952 movie serial Zombies of the Stratosphere.

His breakthrough character Spock, which he played in Star Trek and its animated series and film adaptations, made a significant cultural impact and earned Nimoy three Emmy Award nominations. TV Guide named Spock one of the 50 greatest TV characters. After the original Star Trek series, Nimoy starred in Mission: Impossible for two seasons, hosted the documentary series In Search of..., made several well-received stage appearances, and played villain Doctor Kibner in the 1978 remake of Invasion of the Body Snatchers. In the 1990s, he reprised his role as Spock in a two-part episode of the Star Trek: The Next Generation and the first two Star Trek reboot films, and went on to voice Spock in Star Trek Online. In 2016, one year after his death, Nimoy appeared posthumously in the documentary For the Love of Spock.

== Film ==
Year	Title	Role	Notes
1951	Queen for a Day	Chief	
1951	Rhubarb	Baseball Player	Uncredited
1952	Kid Monk Baroni	Paul "Monk" Baroni	
1952	Francis Goes to West Point	Football Player	Uncredited
1952	Zombies of the Stratosphere	Narab	
1953	Old Overland Trail	Chief Black Hawk	
1954	Combat Psychiatry – The Division Psychiatrist	Distraught Marine	Uncredited; Documentary
1954	Them!	Army Staff Sergeant	Uncredited
1958	The Brain Eaters	Professor Cole	As Leonard Nemoy
1963	The Balcony	Roger	
1965	Deathwatch	Jules Lefranc	Also producer
1971	Catlow	Miller	
1973	Baffled!	Tom Kovak	
1978	Invasion of the Body Snatchers	Dr. David Kibner	
1979	Star Trek: The Motion Picture	Spock	
1982	Star Trek II: The Wrath of Khan	Captain Spock	
1984	Star Trek III: The Search for Spock	Captain Spock	Also director
1986	The Transformers: The Movie	Galvatron	Voice
1986	Star Trek IV: The Voyage Home	Captain Spock	Also director and story by
1987	Three Men and a Baby		Director
1988	The Good Mother		Director
1989	Star Trek V: The Final Frontier	Captain Spock	
1990	Funny About Love		Director
1991	Star Trek VI: The Undiscovered Country	Captain Spock	Also writer
1993	Lights: The Miracle Of Chanukah	Greek Nobleman	Voice; Short animated film
1994	Holy Matrimony		Director
1994	The Pagemaster	Dr. Jekyll / Mr. Hyde	Voice
1995	Titanica	The Narrator	Voice; Documentary
1997	A Life Apart: Hasidism in America	The Narrator	Voice; Documentary
1997	The First Men in the Moon	William Carver	Direct-to-video
1998	The Harryhausen Chronicles	The Narrator	Voice; Documentary
1998	Armageddon: Target Earth	The Narrator	Voice
1999	Rashi: A Light After the Dark Ages	Rashi	Voice; Illustrated-animated film
2000	Sinbad: Beyond the Veil of Mists	Akron / Baraka / King Chandra	Voice
2001	Atlantis: The Lost Empire	King Kashekim Nedakh	Voice
2005	Rambam: The Story of Maimonides	Rambam (Rabbi Moshe Ben Maimon)	Voice; Illustrated-animated film
2009	Star Trek	Spock Prime	
2009	Land of the Lost	The Zarn	Voice
2011	Transformers: Dark of the Moon	Sentinel Prime	Voice
2012	Zambezia	Sekhuru	Voice
2012	New England Time Capsule	The Narrator	Voice; Documentary
2012	Hava Nagila: The Movie	Himself	Documentary
2013	Miracle of Israel	The Narrator	Voice; Documentary
2013	Star Trek Into Darkness	Spock Prime	Cameo; final film role
2016	For the Love of Spock	Himself	Documentary; Posthumous release

== Television ==
Year	Title	Role	Notes
1954	Dragnet	Julius Carver	Episode "The Big Boys"
1956	The West Point Story	Tom Kennedy	2 episodes
c1957–1958	Highway Patrol	Harry Wells / Ray	2 episodes
c1957–1958	Broken Arrow	Apache / Nahilzay / Winnoa	3 episodes
1958	Harbor Command	Fred Garrison	Episode: "Contraband Diamonds"
1958	Mackenzie's Raiders	Kansas	Episode: "The Imposter"
1958	The Silent Service	Sonarman	Episode: "USS Bergall,′The Bergall's Revenge′"
1958–1960	Sea Hunt	Indio	6 episodes
1959	Dragnet	Karlo Rozwadowski	Episode: "The Big Name"
1959	M Squad	Ben Blacker	Episode: "The Fire Makers"
1959	Steve Canyon	Control Tower Sgt.	Episode: "The Search"
1959	Tombstone Territory	Little Hawk	Episode: "The Horse Thief"
1959–1962	Wagon Train	Bernabe Zamora, et al.	4 episodes
1960	Bonanza	Freddy	Episode: "The Ape"
1960	M Squad	Bob Nash	Episode: "Badge for a Coward"
1960	Tate	Comanche Leader	Episode: "Comanche Scalps"
1960	The Rebel	Jim Colburn	Episode: "The Hunted"
1961	Gunsmoke	John Walking Fox / Holt / Arnie / Elias Grice	4 episodes
1960–1961	The Tall Man	Deputy Sheriff Johnny Swift	2 episodes
1961	The Twilight Zone	Hansen	Episode: "A Quality of Mercy"
1961	87th Precinct	Barrow	Episode: "Very Hard Sell"
1961	Rawhide	Anko	Episode: "Incident Before Black Pass"
1962	The Untouchables	Packy	Episode: "Takeover"
1963	Perry Mason	Pete Chennery	Episode: "The Case of the Shoplifter's Shoe"
1963	Combat!	Neumann	Episode: "The Wounded Don't Cry"
1963	The Virginian	Lieutenant Beldon M.D.	Episode: "Man of Violence"
1963	Gunsmoke	Holt	Episode: "I Call Him Wonder"
1964	The Outer Limits	Konig / Judson Ellis	2 episodes
1964	The Man from U.N.C.L.E.	Vladeck	Episode: "The Project Strigas Affair"
1964	The Lieutenant	Gregg Sanders	Episode: "In the Highest Tradition"
1965	Death Valley Days	Yellow Bear	Episode: "The Journey"
1965	Combat!	Private Baum	Episode: "The Raider"
1965	The Virginian	Keith Bentley	Episode: "Show Me a Hero"
1965	The Virginian	Benjamin Frome	Episode: "The Showdown"
1966	Gunsmoke	John Walking Fox	Episode: "The Treasure of John Walking Fox"
1966	A Man Called Shenandoah	Del Hillman	Episode: "Run, Killer, Run"
1966	Get Smart	Stryker	Episode: "The Dead Spy Scrawls"
1966	Daniel Boone	Oontah	Episode: "Seminole Territory"
1966–1969	Star Trek	Spock	79 episodes
1967	Valley of Mystery	Spencer Atherton	Television film
1967	The Carol Burnett Show	guest star	1 episode
1969–1971	Mission: Impossible	The Great Paris	49 episodes
1971	Assault on the Wayne	Commander Phil Kettenring	Television film
1972	Night Gallery	Henry Auden	Episode: "She'll Be Company For You"
1973	Columbo	Dr. Barry Mayfield	Episode: "A Stitch in Crime"
1973	Baffled!	Tom Kovack	Television film
1973	The Alpha Caper	Mitch	Television film
1973	Night Gallery		Directed episode: "Death on a Barge"
1973–1974	Star Trek: The Animated Series	Spock (voice)	22 episodes
1974	Rex Harrison Presents Stories of Love	Mick	Television film
1975	The Missing Are Deadly	Dr. Durov	Television film
1976–1982	In Search of ...	The Narrator / Host	145 episodes
1976	The Captain and Tennille	Himself	1 episode Show #5-76
1980	Seizure: The Story of Kathy Morris	Dr. Richard Connought	Television film
1981	Vincent	Theo van Gogh	Television film; also director and co-writer
1982–1987	Standby...Lights! Camera! Action!	Himself / Host	20 episodes
1982	A Woman Called Golda	Morris Meyerson	Television film
1982	The Powers of Matthew Star		Directed episode: "The Triangle"
1983	Marco Polo	Ahmad Fanakati	3 episodes
1983	T. J. Hooker	Lieutenant Paul McGuire	Episode: "Vengeance is Mine"
1983	T. J. Hooker		Directed episode: "The Decoy"
1984	The Sun Also Rises	Count Mippipopolous	2 episodes
1986	Faerie Tale Theatre	The Evil Moroccan Magician	Episode: "Aladdin and His Wonderful Lamp"
1991	Haunted Lives: True Ghost Stories	The Narrator (voice)	Episode: "Ghosts R Us/Legend of Kate Morgan/School Spirit"
1991	Never Forget	Mel Mermelstein	Television film
1991	Star Trek: The Next Generation	Ambassador Spock	Episodes: "Unification"
1993	The Halloween Tree	Carapace Clavicle Moundshroud (voice)	Television film
1993; 1997	The Simpsons	Himself (voice)	Episodes: "Marge vs. the Monorail" and "The Springfield Files"
1994–1998	Ancient Mysteries	The Narrator (voice)	91 episodes
1995	Bonanza: Under Attack	Frank James	Television film
1995–1997	Deadly Games		Executive producer and directed episode: "Killshot"
1995	The Outer Limits	Thomas Cutler	Episode: "I, Robot"
1996	Star Trek: Deep Space Nine	Spock	Archive footage used in one episode ("Trials and Tribble-ations")
1997	David	Samuel	Television film
1997	Duckman	Himself	Episode: "Where No Duckman Has Gone Before"
1998	Brave New World	Mustapha Mond	Television film
1998	The Lost World	Angus McArdle (voice)	Television film
1998	Invasion America	General Konrad (voice)	4 episodes
1999–2002	Futurama	Himself (voice)	Episodes: "Space Pilot 3000" and "Where No Fan Has Gone Before"
2001	Becker	Professor Emmett Fowler	Episode: "The TorMentor"
2009–2012	Fringe	William Bell	11 episodes
2012	The Big Bang Theory	Spock Action Figure (voice)	Uncredited; Episode: "The Transporter Malfunction"
2020	Star Trek: Discovery	Ambassador Spock	Archive footage used in one episode: "Unification III"
2022	Star Trek: Prodigy	Spock	Episode: "Kobayashi"; archive audio
2024	Young Sheldon	Spock	Episode: "Funeral"; archive footage

== Music videos ==
Year	Title	Artist	Notes
1967	"The Ballad of Bilbo Baggins"	Leonard Nimoy	
1985	"Going Down to Liverpool"	The Bangles	The Chauffeur
2011	"The Lazy Song"	Bruno Mars	Alternate music video

== Video games ==
Year	Title	Voice role
1994	Star Trek: 25th Anniversary	Spock
1995	Star Trek: Judgment Rites	Spock
1999	Seaman	The Narrator
2005	Civilization IV	The Narrator
2010	Star Trek Online	Spock
2010	Kingdom Hearts Birth by Sleep	Xehanort
2012	Kingdom Hearts 3D: Dream Drop Distance	Xehanort
