= Susan Bay =

American actress

Susan Linda Bay Nimoy
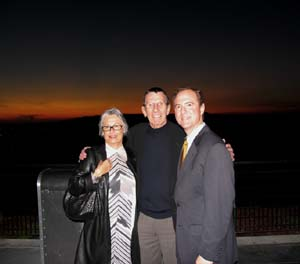
- Susan Bay, Leonard Nimoy, and Congressman Adam Schiff in 2006
- Born: Susan Linda Bay; March 16, 1943 (age 83); Los Angeles, California, U.S.
- Occupations: Actress, director
- Years active: 1963–present
- Organization: Foundation for National Progress
- Spouses: John Schuck (m. 1978; div. 1983) Leonard Nimoy (m. 1989; died 2015)
- Children: Aaron Bay-Schuck
- Relatives: Michael Bay (cousin); Adam Nimoy (stepson); Julie Nimoy (stepdaughter)

Susan Linda Bay Nimoy (born Susan Linda Bay; March 16, 1943) is an American actress and director. Among her television appearances, she portrayed Admiral Rollman in two episodes of the television series Star Trek: Deep Space Nine: "Past Prologue" in the first season and "Whispers" in the second.

Bay was one of the Original Six, a group of women directors who created the Women's Steering Committee of the Directors Guild of America, to protest against gender discrimination in Hollywood. Bay has directed several documentaries, and the American premiere of Shakespeare's Will (2007). She returned to directing in 2018 with Eve, a film addressing issues of aging and mourning. She wrote the script while grieving for her husband, Leonard Nimoy.

== Career ==
=== Acting ===
Bay debuted on an episode of The Many Loves of Dobie Gillis in 1963. and The Skydivers (film, 1963). She appeared in various TV series throughout the 1960s, including episodes of Dr. Kildare (1964) and Perry Mason (1965). Susan Bay's film debut in a leading role occurred in the Jerry Lewis comedy The Big Mouth (1967). Bay portrayed Suzie Cartwright, the love interest of Lewis's character, Gerald Clamson.

During the 1970s and 1980s, Bay's television roles included episodes of One Day at a Time (1976), Starsky and Hutch (1977), Hart to Hart (1980), Family Ties (1983) and Remington Steele (1983). She also had a lead role in the television pilot Alone at Last (1980). She played Admiral Rollman in Star Trek: Deep Space Nine's first and second season in the episodes "Past Prologue" (1993) and "Whispers" (1994). Bay appeared as Rebecca in the 2009 film Mother and Child. In 2019, she began to appear in the CDC's Anti-Smoking Campaign "Tips from Former Smokers" discussing her late husband's battle with COPD.

=== Directing ===
In 1979, Bay and other members of the Original Six, a group of women directors, created the Women's Steering Committee of the Directors Guild of America, to protest against gender discrimination in Hollywood and support female employment on film and television sets at the directing level.

Bay was a production consultant on "The Good Mother" (1988), which was directed by Leonard Nimoy. In 1998, Bay was the executive producer for the documentary film Liza Lou, on the glass bead artist Liza Lou. She has also worked on documentaries about Twyla Tharp and the magazine Mother Jones.

In 2007, Bay directed the American premiere of Shakespeare's Will, a solo play by Vern Thiessen that featured Jeanmarie Simpson as Anne Hathaway.

Susan Bay Nimoy returned to directing in 2018 with Eve, writing the script as she mourned her husband, Leonard Nimoy, and starring in the film after the lead actress pulled out at the last minute due to discomfort with revealing her aging body on film. The lack of representation of "women of age" onscreen was one of Nimoy's motivations in creating the film. Eve was one of five films at the 2018 Sundance Film Festival to focus on women in their 70s, and was positively received.

=== Philanthropy ===
Bay is a member of the board of directors of the Foundation for National Progress, which publishes Mother Jones.

In 1999, Bay and Nimoy made a $100,000 donation to the Museum of Contemporary Art, Los Angeles (MOCA) so it could purchase The Ballad of Sexual Dependency by Nan Goldin. In 2007, they financially supported WACK! Art and the Feminist Revolution, an art exhibition at the MOCA. In 2008, they made a $1 million donation to The Leonard Nimoy Event Horizon Theater at Griffith Observatory.

== Personal life ==
Bay is a cousin of Rabbi John Rosove, of Temple Israel of Hollywood, as well as film director Michael Bay.

In 1978, Bay married actor John Schuck, and their son Aaron was born in 1981. They divorced in 1983. She married Leonard Nimoy in 1989. She was photographed for Nimoy's Shekhina, a book of monochrome nude photography of women representing Shekhinah, the presence of God in Judaism. She and Nimoy were together until his death in 2015.
