= Shakespeare's Will (play) =

2005 play by Vern Thiessen

Shakespeare's Will is a play by Canadian writer Vern Thiessen. It was commissioned by Geoffrey Brumlik, then Artistic Director of the River City Shakespeare Festival in Edmonton as a performance vehicle for Jan Alexandra Smith and premiered at the Citadel Theatre in February 2005. It has been regularly revived and was performed at the Stratford Shakespeare Festival in 2011. Shakespeare's Will was published in 2002 by Playwrights Canada Press.

The American premiere of Shakespeare's Will was produced at Theatre 40 in Beverly Hills, California. The production starred Jeanmarie Simpson, was produced by Leonard Nimoy and directed by Susan Bay. Nimoy said he agreed to produce the show because 'It's a very beautiful piece, very beautifully written, very moving, and funny." The production led to a long-term creative collaboration between Nimoy and Thiessen which later included a specially commissioned play.

Shakespeare's Will is a one-woman monodrama that focuses on Anne Hathaway on the day of her husband William Shakespeare's funeral. Its form has been described as a "poetic monologue that is fragmentary, and richly allusive." The audience shares details of her historically-unknown personal life, a mixture of general information about the lives of women in Elizabethan England, fictional dramatic twists, and twenty-first century interpretations.

== Synopsis ==
The drama focuses on the will handed to William Shakespeare's widow Anne as she leaves his funeral. She is surprised by its existence and that his sister Joan should give it to her with a noticeably odd smile. Joan promises to visit in an hour.

Anne resists reading the will, remembering instead the passion and the vows she shared with her husband, Catholic in public but 'their own kind of marriage' in private. These unusual vows accommodated their desires as individuals, but left Anne alone in Stratford to raise their three children. She relives the decision points where Bill's London life became a separate existence. When plague sweeps the country, she must find a way to protect the children without news or support from William and relates her decision to take them to the seashore, far from disease and death. Her flight repeats her own childhood journey, when her father brought her and her siblings to the sea and away from the plague which killed her mother.

An hour later, Anne must read the will. She appreciates Bill's intention to secure the honours he has earned through his daughter's possible sons. She understands his bequests until she reads his provision for the house. Her loathed sister-in-law will inherit her prized house, while she is deeded the second best bed. The order of William's estate can only be punishment for their son's death from drowning. He has broken their pact. Anne's rage at his post-mortem betrayal, after she honourably maintained her side of their vows, gives her the strength to break free from the constraints of her situation as well. She decides to return to the sea to make a life for herself.

The play shows William's success in London through a domestic lens, where Anne's children, garden, bees and marketing are the focus. Anne's own childhood journey to the sea supplies a pattern of water-based imagery which resolves in the final sequence of the play; it is a mirror and cyclic resolution to Bill's love affair with words.

== Interpretation ==
Scholar Anne Wilson interprets the play as an exploration of recent debate in Canada about non-traditional marriages and relationships, writing that 'the play's politics and key adaptive gestures coincide with transformations in Canada around orthodoxies associated with gender roles and families'. Wilson also notes Thiessen's exploration of the relationship between sexual freedom and patriarchal norms of male succession. She draws attention to the repeated emphasis on imagery of the sea, flow, and voyages to express the fluid nature of desire and human intimacies.

Reviewer James Wenley praised the show as 'catnip for Shakespeare fans', writing that Anne emerges from the play a vivid and humanized character. He found Theissen's speculation of the Shakespeare marriage fascinating, believable, and delivering 'a very palpable sense of the time and place'.

Conversely, reviewer John Coulbourn believed that "not much of it rings true, either to the heart or to the period of the piece", considering that Anne's musings were too generic to convince.

J. Kelly Nestruck objected to the "anachronistic proto-feminist" portrayal of Hathaway, arguing that "there's no getting away from the fact that Shakespeare's Will is ultimately a drama once removed. Hathaway is of interest only because of whom she married."

Critic Katherine Scheil says that the play 'recasts the poet's domestic life into a familiar narrative for a twenty-first-century audience, a sort of inspirational 'Chicken Soup for the Lonely Married Woman' based on the Shakespeare marriage', setting up Shakespeare as a 'vengeful husband' who fails to appreciate the sacrifices his wife made. However, she notes in conclusion that audiences seem receptive to a play about a stay-at-home mother's inspirational struggle and triumph, despite its unflattering rendition of the man himself.

The play has been produced across Canada, Wales, England, Hong Kong, Australia, New Zealand, and the United States.
