= Deadly Games (TV series) =

- Genre: Science fiction
- Created by: Paul Bernbaum; S.S. Schweitzer; Anthony Spinner
- Starring: James Calvert; Christopher Lloyd; Cynthia Gibb; Stephen T. Kay
- Composer: Dennis McCarthy
- Country of origin: United States
- Original language: English
- No. of seasons: 1
- No. of episodes: 13

Production
- Producer: William S. Kerr
- Production location: California
- Cinematography: Billy Dickson
- Editors: Bill Butler; Terry Kelley
- Running time: 60 minutes
- Production companies: Shaken, Not Stirred Productions; Rumbleseat Productions; Viacom Productions

Original release
- Network: UPN
- Release: September 5, 1995 – January 16, 1996

Deadly Games is an American action science fiction television series that aired on UPN from September 5, 1995, to January 16, 1996. The basic plot of the show is about video game characters that come to life, re-enacting their deadly plans for wanton destruction and world domination in the real world. The series was produced by Viacom Productions.

== Plot ==
The first episode introduces the protagonist, Dr. Gus Lloyd, an antimatter physicist, engineer and video game designer who has created a live-action game in his spare time to exert his indignant feelings about his recent divorce and all the people in his life who have all made his life hell on Earth (his father, his ex-wife's mother, his ex-wife's divorce lawyer, his ex-girlfriend, his former employer, a high school football quarterback and bully, his old camp counselor, the garbage man, a corrupt car mechanic); the villains of the game are modeled after all these people. The master villain is Jackal, who is a combination of the devil and Gus' father. The Jackal wears a vanilla white ice cream suit and drives a Chrysler convertible to match.

The hero is "The Cold-Steel Kid", a warrior trying to save the dying world, dons commando wear and is naturally modeled after Gus himself. "The Girl", a sometimes heroic damsel in distress that The Kid must frequently rescue is based on Lauren Ashborne, Gus' ex-wife.

In an accident involving an experimental laboratory project, the villains enter the real world to cause the chaos that they were intended to perpetrate in the game.

Each week, one of the villains tries to carry out an evil plot according to the rules of the video game, and Gus, Lauren, and Gus' friend Peter Rucker try to defeat and destroy the villain. Almost indestructible and superhumanly strong, each villain is programmed with specific weapons and weaknesses based on that villain's "theme": "Killshot" was vulnerable to water; “The Boss” attacked with exploding “pink slips” and was vulnerable to red ink; “The Evil Shirley” was vulnerable to dirt and she would be killed by having a house fall on her; “The Camp Counselor” was vulnerable to fast-lighting charcoal, and would be killed by an arrow shot through the bulls-eye emblem on his T-shirt; “The Practical Joker” could only be defeated by foiling his master prank; “The Divorce Attorney” absorbed electricity and redistributed it as lightning bolts (her weakness was a foam-rubber arrow); “The Motivational Speaker” killed people with a gun that reduced people to his own audiotape, and he could only be destroyed by eating his own words (but he could be slowed down with shots from a paintball gun); a corrupted car mechanic who tasered people with a calculator would be destroyed by seeing his own reflection; “The Garbage Man” was damaged by cleaning products; and “The Orthodontist” and his assistant had an aversion to sugar; “The Ex-Girlfriend” was a misandrist whose weakness was gold. All the henchmen vaporized in blue smoke when the Jackal's weekly scheme was foiled. The Jackal's own vice was being hit with a specific baseball—one autographed by Bobby Mercer, a souvenir of the only baseball game Gus attended with his father. The Jackal is present in every episode, commanding the other villains and vexing the heroes, usually with a glass of champagne in hand.

== Characters ==
=== Main ===
The following characters appear in every episode:

- Dr. Gus Lloyd/The Cold-Steel Kid (James Calvert)
- Lauren Ashborne/The Girl (Cynthia Gibb)
- Sebastian Jackal/Dr. Jordan Kenneth Lloyd (Christopher Lloyd)
- Peter Rucker (Stephen T. Kay)

=== Guests: One-time villains ===
Each of the following characters appears in only one episode:

- "Killshot" Tom Rothman (Tom Rathman)
- "One Mean Mother," Shirley Ashborne/Evil Shirley (Shirley Jones)
- "The Orthodontist," Dr. Kramer (Christopher Neame)
- "The Dental Hygienist," Sharon (Dr. Kramer's assistant) (Marjorie Monaghan)
- "The Boss," Mr. Metcalf (LeVar Burton)
- "The Divorce Lawyer," Courtney Lake (Victoria Rowell)
- "The Trash Man," Roy Hopkins (Mike Starr)
- "The Motivational Speaker," Nathan Abrams (Dwight Schultz)
- "The Practical Joker," Danny Schlecht (Brent Spiner)
- "The Camp Counselor," Chuck Manley (Anthony Michael Hall)
- "The Car Mechanic," Ross Logan (Mark Pellegrino)
- "The Ex-Girlfriend," Belinda Madigan (Beth Toussaint)

== Episodes ==
No.	Title	Directed by	Written by	Original release date
1	"Killshot"	Leonard Nimoy	Paul Bernbaum & Anthony Spinner	September 5, 1995
Mild-mannered scientist Gus Lloyd has a hobby that allows him to blow off steam: He designs video games and bases his bad guys on people who bug him. But a freak accident occurs, unleashing the sublimely sinister Sebastian Jackal and his minions on the real world. First up is a Quarterback who plans to help The Jackal to kill Gus and Lauren and blow up everyone at the Super Bowl.
2	"One Mean Mother"	Jim Charleston	Paul Bernbaum	September 12, 1995
Jackal enlists the aid of "Evil Shirley," an Ice Queen who's patterned after Lauren's mother, to help plant a bomb on a cruise ship that Lauren's real mom and her fiancé are on.
3	"The Boss"	Christopher Hibler	Lee Goldberg & William Rabkin	September 19, 1995
Jackal and the evil video version of Gus's first boss plan to blow up a gasoline truck — with Lauren's ex-fiancé behind the wheel.
4	"The End of the Jackal"	Burt Brinckerhoff	Paul Bernbaum	September 26, 1995
Jackal's real-life model is revealed as the supervillain sets his sights on the destruction of "the family," with a park and a maternity ward primary targets. Meanwhile, Peter believes he's found a way to put the supervillain back into the game for good, but his actions may have cost Gus and Lauren their lives in the real world as well.
5	"The Camp Counselor: Part 1"	Jim Charleston	Jack Bernstein	October 3, 1995
Just when Gus though it was safe, Jackal exercises his power from within the computer, sending the "Perfect Woman" (Kathy Ireland) into the real world, followed by Gus's sadistic childhood camp counselor, who plans to blow up a Marine base with a rocket.
6	"The Camp Counselor: Part 2"	Jim Charleston	Jack Bernstein	October 10, 1995
Gus rescues Lauren from her imprisonment in the computer, but in the process releases Jackal and the other bad guys — including the evil camp counselor Chuck, who embarks on a mission to blow up a Marine base commander.
7	"The Practical Joker"	Adam Nimoy	Paul Bernbaum	October 17, 1995
Practical joker Danny Schlecht enters a new character into the game who (a) plants a bomb in Gus's VCR, (b) drugs Lauren and Peter and puts them in a compromising position, and (c) meets Jackal — who's not sure how to treat this new villain.
8	"The Car Mechanic"	Christopher Hibler	Lee Goldberg & William Rabkin	November 7, 1995
In the midst of a wicked heat wave, Jackal throws a monkey wrench into Gus's life in the form of car mechanic Ross Logan, who aims to derail a train; meanwhile, Detective Dorn (Sam McMurray) gets closer to the truth about the game.
9	"The Divorce Lawyer"	Christian I. Nyby II	Kate Boutilier	November 14, 1995
Gus is shocked to learn the latest villain is Lauren's divorce lawyer, currently charged with 10,000 volts and aiming to electrify the Supreme Court Justices' chairs, unless Gus and Lauren can ground the amped-up attorney first. Lauren is shocked to find out for this level, she is the one calling the shots.
10	"The Motivational Speaker"	Christian I. Nyby II	Jed Seidel	November 21, 1995
A slick, motor-mouthed motivational speaker spells trouble when he drives a wedge between Gus and Peter, then embarks on a nefarious plan to poison the New Year's Eve ball at Times Square.
11	"The Trash Man"	Neema Barnette	Craig Tepper	January 2, 1996
When Gus is awakened by the sound of garbage can lids banging together, he realizes that another level of the game has begun. Meet The Trash Man, a filthy adversary armed with radioactive sludge who is out to destroy the sites of all of Gus and Lauren's most magical moments. Armed in turn with the cleaning products they know will slow the villain down, Gus, Lauren and Peter go on a chase that takes them through a museum to a Las Vegas motel and, ultimately, the Hollywood Bowl.
12	"Dr. Kramer"	Bruce Bilson	Paul Bernbaum	January 9, 1996
Dr. Kramer, The Orthodontist, plans to pump laughing gas into the comedy club. At the same time, Lauren's comedian friend is attempting to make a comeback. Dr. Kramer is defeated early on and Sharon, The oral Hygienist, continues to carry on the task.
13	"The Ex-Girlfriend"	Max Tash	Paul Bernbaum	January 16, 1996
Peter plans on moving into Lauren's mother's guest-house. The university terminates Gus and Peter's grant. Belinda, the leather-clad dominatrix Ex-Girlfriend, wants revenge herself on The Cold-Steel Kid and all men. She can only be defeated by a golden bullet.

== Home media ==
On June 11, 2018, Visual Entertainment released the complete series on DVD in Region 1.
