= Tom Corson =

American record executive

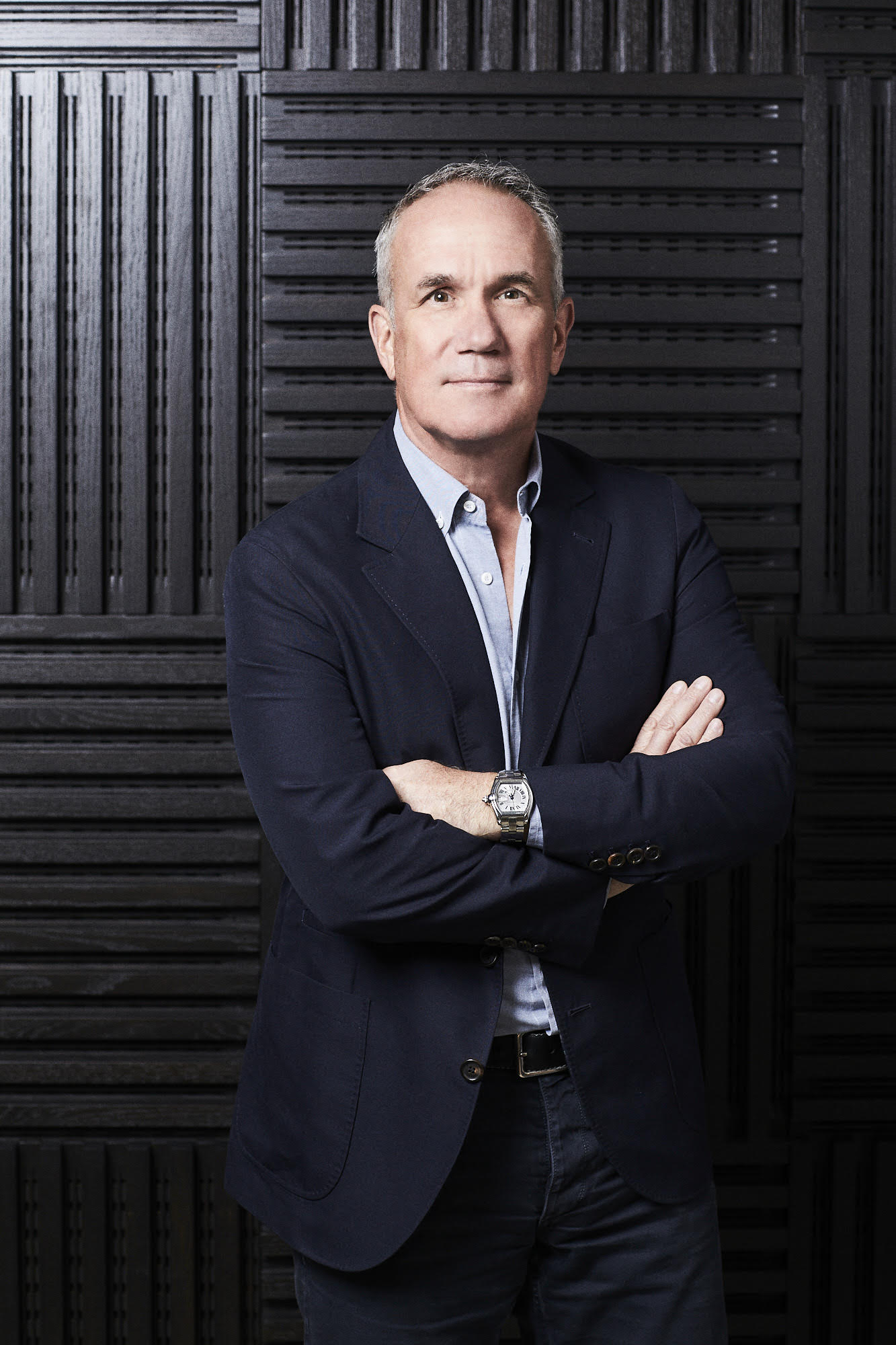
- Born: Thomas Charles Corson; Seattle, Washington
- Education: University of California, Los Angeles
- Occupations: Chief operating officer, Warner Music Group
- Years active: 1985-present
- Board member of: Inaugural chair, UCLA School of Music Business, board of advisors TJ Martell Foundation; City of Hope Music and Entertainment Industry Executive Board
- Website: warnerrecords.com

Tom Corson is an American record executive. The chief operating officer of Warner Music Group, he was the COO and co-chair of Warner Records from 2018 through 2026. He served previously as president and chief operating officer of RCA Records.

== Early life and education ==
Corson was born and grew up in Seattle, Washington. He moved to Los Angeles in 1978 to attend UCLA. He interned at IRS Records during his junior and senior year, and graduated from UCLA in 1982 with a BA in business/economics.

== Career ==
=== 1985-1990: IRS Records, A&M Records ===
Following his graduation, IRS hired Corson as director of West Coast sales; in 1985, he was named director of West Coast promotion. At IRS—a "giant of the post-punk era"—he worked with artists including the Go Go's, R.E.M., the English Beat and General Public. In 1985, Corson moved to A&M Records to become the executive assistant to the label's president, Gil Friesen. As Friesen's executive assistant, Corson performed roles in special projects, product management, international marketing, marketing, and A&R at the label. He was named vice president of marketing in 1989. At A&M, Corson was recognized for his role in the success of artists including Soundgarden, Simple Minds, and UB40.

=== 1990-1999: Capitol Records, Columbia Records ===
Corson was hired by Capitol Records as vice president of international in 1990, and was promoted to senior vice president of domestic marketing in 1993. He oversaw the global campaigns for MC Hammer's two Capitol releases, Please Hammer, Don't Hurt 'Em and Too Legit to Quit, which together sold more than 17 million copies worldwide. He also worked closely with Radiohead, who released their major label debut, Pablo Honey, in 1993. and orchestrated the marketing campaigns for Mazzy Star and the Frank Sinatra Duets album, among others.

In January 1996, Corson was named senior vice president of marketing for Columbia Records and moved from Los Angeles to Columbia's headquarters in New York City. During Corson's tenure, Columbia's market share increased, with hit records in multiple genres including pop (Train), rock (System of a Down) and Latin music (Ricky Martin) in addition to soundtrack releases such as Armageddon and Men in Black. Corson left Columbia in December 1999 to accept a position as senior vice president of worldwide marketing at Arista Records.

=== 1999-2007: J Records, Arista, RCA Music Group ===
After an industry outcry when parent company BMG ousted Arista founder and CEO Clive Davis from the label in 2000, BMG invested $150 million to launch J Records, a joint venture with Davis. An "instant major," Davis hired Corson as executive vice president of worldwide marketing. J was a success from the start, with the label's inaugural release, Alicia Keys' Songs in A Minor, selling over 12,000,000 records worldwide. That same year, O-Town's self-titled debut achieved multi-platinum sales; Inside Magazine called its marketing plan "one of the most elaborate star-making campaigns of the modern media age." J Records dominated the charts during its three-year existence as a standalone label, releasing hit records by artists including Jamie Foxx, Jennifer Hudson, Alicia Keys, Pearl Jam, and the winners from the American Idol franchise. Rod Stewart's Great American Songbook releases became the biggest-selling ongoing series of new music recordings in history, and Luther Vandross had the first #1 record of his career, Dance With My Father.

In 2002, BMG bought a majority stake in J and folded it into the RCA Music Group—which also included Arista—and appointed Davis president and CEO. Corson was named executive vice president and GM of Arista/J in 2004; there, he oversaw releases from Dido, Whitney Houston and Santana, among others. In 2007, Corson was appointed executive vice president and GM of RCA Records. He held a central role in restructuring the company in the wake of a series of mergers.

=== 2007-2017: RCA Records ===
In 2007, Corson was appointed executive vice president and GM of RCA Records. He held a central role in restructuring the company in the wake of a series of mergers.

In 2011, he was promoted to president and COO of RCA Records by Doug Morris, the CEO of parent company Sony Music Entertainment. He was noted for his role in the success of artists including A$AP Rocky, Kelly Clarkson, Miley Cyrus, Foo Fighters, Jennifer Hudson, Dave Matthews Band, Kesha, Kings of Leon, Miguel, P!nk, and Justin Timberlake.

=== 2017-present: Warner Records, Warner Music Group ===
Corson was named co-chairman and COO of Warner Records in December 2017, and led the transition from Warner Bros. Records to Warner Records with Aaron Bay-Schuck, Warner's CEO. He has overseen the release of albums and singles by Benson Boone, Zach Bryan,Michael Bublé, Linkin Park, Dua Lipa, Josh Groban, Red Hot Chili Peppers, Sombr, and Teddy Swims, among others. He executive produced the documentary Tom Petty, Somewhere You Feel Free: The Making of Wildflowers, which won a Producers Guild Award in 2022. He worked closely with Andra Day as the executive producer of the soundtrack for The United States vs. Billie Holiday, a film in which she starred.

He was appointed COO of Warner Music Group in July, 2026.

== Recognition ==
- Billboard Power 100 (2012-2026)
- Billboard Country Power Players (2024, 2025)
- Variety 500 (2019-2026)
- City of Hope Spirit of Life Award, 2025
- Variety Hitmakers Awards, Executive of the Year (with Bay-Schuck), (2024)
- TJ Martell Foundation Lifetime Music Industry Award, 2023
- UJA Music Visionary of the Year (with Edge), 2016

Corson is chair of the Dean’s Board of Advisors for The UCLA Herb Alpert School of Music; vice chairman of the executive committee of the board of directors for the TJ Martell Foundation; and a member of the Music and Entertainment Industry Board for City of Hope.
