= World of the Unexplained =

The World of the Unexplained were two museums, opened in 1972 by Ripley's Believe It or Not!, one at Fisherman's Wharf in San Francisco (37°48′29″N 122°24′55″W) and one in Gatlinburg, Tennessee, originally called the Museum of Witchcraft and Magic.

Ripley's had acquired the late Gerald B. Gardner's collection of witchcraft items from Wiccan Monique Wilson, and displayed them in the museums.

In 1975, due to pressure from the local churches and religious groups in the area, Ripley's changed their names to World of the Unexplained and re-outfitted them with new attractions. With the popularity of the television show "In Search Of", Ripley's hired the show's narrator, Leonard Nimoy, to film a short introduction to visitors at the entrance to the museums.

The museums displayed not only witchcraft attractions but new ones that featured Bigfoot, flying saucers, the Bermuda Triangle, werewolves, and a fortune teller with a talking crystal ball. In 1985, the museums closed down for good, due to poor ticket sales.

Ripleys' relocated all the attractions to other Ripley's Odditoriums around the US and Canada. The Gatlinburg location is no longer operated by Ripley's. The building in San Francisco is a Ripleys' Believe It or Not Odditorium.
