= Aaron Bay-Schuck =

American music executive

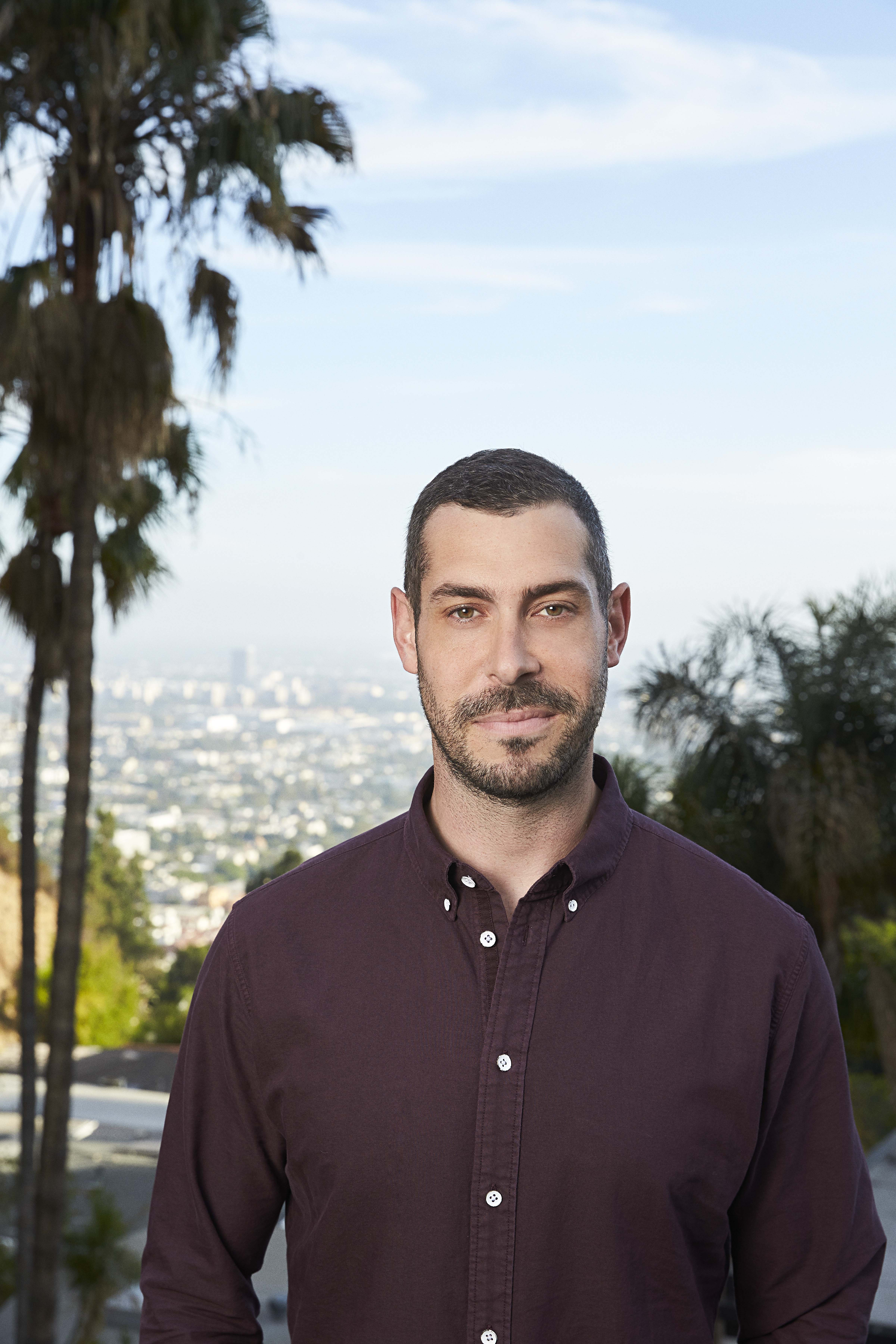
- Bay-Schuck in 2018
- Born: September 5, 1981 (age 45); Los Angeles, California, U.S.
- Education: Columbia University (BA)
- Occupations: Record executive, chairman and CEO of Warner Records
- Parents: John Schuck (father); Susan Bay (mother)
- Relatives: Leonard Nimoy (stepfather); Julie Nimoy (stepsister); Adam Nimoy (stepbrother)
- Awards: Billboard Power 100 (2019-2026); Variety 500 (2019-2025)

Aaron Bay-Schuck (born September 5, 1981) is an American music industry executive. The CEO and chairman of Warner Records (formerly Warner Bros. Records), he was previously the president of A&R at Interscope Geffen A&M and the senior vice president of A&R at Atlantic Records.

== Early life and education ==
Bay-Schuck was born in Los Angeles to actors Susan Bay and John Schuck. His parents divorced when he was a child, and in 1989 his mother married actor Leonard Nimoy. His mother is a cousin of film director and producer Michael Bay.

Bay-Schuck attended Columbia University, where he majored in political science. He planned to attend law school and pursue a career in entertainment law. In his senior year, he met Diane Mayer, an executive at Capitol Records, and had a conversation with her about how record companies operate. With the help of Mayer, he applied for an internship at Interscope Records the following day. He was hired, and although he interned in the video promotion department, he became interested in A&R. He graduated from Columbia in 2003.

== Career ==
=== Atlantic Records, Interscope ===
Bay-Schuck returned to Los Angeles following his college graduation. Knowing that jobs at record companies had become scarce as the music industry constricted in the post-Napster era, he registered at an employment agency that placed temps at labels. He was assigned a short-term job at Interscope, and was quickly hired as a full-time assistant to Martin Kierszenbaum, then the head of international marketing for the label. Determined to work in A&R, he left Interscope a year later to take a job as an A&R assistant at Atlantic. In 2006, he was promoted to a staff A&R position. His first hits in an A&R capacity were with the songs "Shawty" by Plies featuring T-Pain, and "Right Round" by Flo Rida featuring Kesha. Bay-Schuck co-wrote "Right Round," which went five times platinum in the US and sold more than 10 million copies worldwide.

Over the course of his ten years at Atlantic, Bay-Schuck worked with Cee Lo Green, B.o.B., T.I., Trey Songz, Travie McCoy, and Trick Daddy, among others. Most notably, he discovered, signed and developed Bruno Mars, who has since sold more than 170 million singles and 26 million albums worldwide. Following his success with Mars, Bay-Schuck, who had originally focused on rap and R&B, worked with artists in multiple genres. He was appointed senior vice president of A&R for Atlantic in 2012.

In 2014, Bay-Schuck was named president of A&R at Interscope Geffen A&M (IGA). At IGA he worked with artists including Gwen Stefani, Imagine Dragons, Lady Gaga, Skylar Grey, Maroon 5, OneRepublic, and Selena Gomez.

=== Warner Records ===
In October 2017, it was announced that Bay-Schuck had been appointed CEO and co-chairman of Warner Records. Since then, the label has released gold, platinum, and multi-platinum records by artists including Benson Boone, Zach Bryan, Michael Bublé, Linkin Park, Dua Lipa, sombr, Teddy Swims, and Red Hot Chili Peppers, among others. He was named chairman of Warner Records in July 2026.

Bay-Schuck was an executive producer of the 2021 documentary Tom Petty, Somewhere You Feel Free: The Making of Wildflowers. The film won a Producers Guild Award in 2022.

== Recognition ==
Bay-Schuck has appeared on the Billboard Power 100 every year from 2019-2026,the Variety 500 from 2019-2026, and the Billboard Country Power Players list in 2024 and 2025. Variety named Bay-Schuck and former Warner Records COO and co-chairman Tom Corson executives of the year in 2024.
