= Remembering Leonard Nimoy =

2017 film

- Theatrical release poster
- Directed by: Julie Nimoy, David Knight
- Produced by: Julie Nimoy; David Knight; David Zappone
- Cinematography: Scott Yun
- Edited by: Ron Frank
- Production company: Health Point Productions
- Release date: April 23, 2017 (Newport Beach Film Festival)
- Running time: 1 hour
- Country: United States
- Language: English

Remembering Leonard Nimoy: His Life, Legacy and Battle with COPD is a 2017 American biographical documentary film about Leonard Nimoy and his battle with chronic obstructive pulmonary disease. It was produced and directed by his daughter and son-in-law, Julie Nimoy and David Knight.

== Synopsis ==
The film focuses on the life and career of actor Leonard Nimoy and his battle with chronic obstructive pulmonary disease (COPD), along with his wishes of increasing awareness and prevention of the illness. Narrated by his daughter Julie with a voiceover appearance by Star Trek actor John de Lancie, the film features interviews with Nimoy's immediate family, his personal physician and private nurse, and lung disease experts.

== Production ==
Nimoy revealed during a January 2014 appearance on Piers Morgan Live that he was suffering from chronic obstructive pulmonary disease. He became an advocate and activist for COPD awareness thereafter, and posted on social media about the dangers of smoking. His daughter Julie Nimoy collaborated with his son-in-law, filmmaker David Knight, in producing a documentary that would chronicle Nimoy's battle with the disease.

After Nimoy's death in 2015, the focus of the film was changed to serve as a remembrance of his life. With funding from commercial and private contributors, Knight and Julie Nimoy began production in January 2016. Working titles included COPD: "Highly Illogical"— A Special Tribute to Leonard Nimoy. The documentary’s first trailer and poster were released in February 2017.

== Release ==
A preliminary version of the film was screened on April 23, 2017 at the Newport Beach Film Festival, and was followed by a Q & A with Nimoy's family. In June 2017, American Public Television acquired the distribution rights to broadcast the film on its PBS affiliates nationwide.
