= Shekhina (book) =

Photography book by Leonard Nimoy

- Author: Leonard Nimoy
- Language: English
- Genre: Photography
- Publisher: Umbrage Editions
- Publication date: October 2002
- ISBN: 978-1-884-16716-4

Shekhina is a book of photography by Leonard Nimoy representing the feminine side of Jewish divinity as visualized via the imagery of women, with commentary on Jewish tradition and scripture provided by David Kuspit. The book received a certain amount of controversy for the perceived risqué nature of a number of the photographs with his use of nude and partly clad women donning a tallit and tefillin, Jewish prayer accessories traditionally worn by men.

The title comes from the feminine Hebrew word shekhinah, meaning the glory or radiance of God, or God's presence.

- Nimoy, Leonard; Kuspit, Donald (Oct 2002). Shekhina. Umbrage Editions. p. 96. ISBN 9781884167164.
