= For the Love of Spock =

2016 film by Adam Nimoy

- Theatrical release poster
- Directed by: Adam Nimoy
- Produced by: Joseph Kornbrodt; Kevin Layne; David Zappone; Kai de Mello-Folsom
- Cinematography: Kevin Layne
- Edited by: Janice Hampton a.c.e. Luke Snailham
- Music by: Nicholas Pike
- Production company: 455 Films
- Release dates: April 16, 2016 (Tribeca Film Festival); September 9, 2016
- Running time: 111 minutes
- Country: United States
- Language: English

For the Love of Spock is a 2016 American documentary film about actor Leonard Nimoy produced by 455 Films and directed by his son Adam Nimoy, who started it before his father's death, at the age of 83, on February 27, 2015.

The documentary deals with the story of the character Spock, his impact in science fiction and popular culture, and the burden the character's fame imposed on Nimoy's personal and family life, from his son's point of view.

== Synopsis ==
The film looks at the life and career of actor Leonard Nimoy, and his iconic character Mr. Spock. It includes interviews with cast, crew and people connected with Star Trek, fans at conventions, as well as personal memories.

As Odie Henderson from RogerEbert.com points out, "'For the Love of Spock' is more than just catnip for Trekkies. It’s also an often painful examination of the rocky father/son relationship that existed between filmmaker Adam Nimoy and his famous father, Leonard."

== Production ==
By Thanksgiving 2014, Adam Nimoy started working with his father in a documentary about Spock, to commemorate Star Trek: The Original Series’s 50th anniversary. After Leonard Nimoy's passing on February 27, 2015, the outpouring of affection from Star Trek fans prompted him to widen the film’s scope to encompass his father’s life and career beyond Spock.

To license Spock's still photographs and film clips from television and feature films in time to complete the documentary by 2016, Adam Nimoy launched a Kickstarter campaign in June 2015, aiming to collect US$600,000 in one month which attracted worldwide interest. By the end of the campaign, 9,439 backers pledged US$662,640, making it the most successful crowdfund of the period.

Production continued with interviews of William Shatner, George Takei, Walter Koenig, Nichelle Nichols, Chris Pine, Zachary Quinto, Simon Pegg, Zoe Saldaña, Jim Parsons, Jason Alexander, Neil deGrasse Tyson and J. J. Abrams.

Adam Nimoy appeared as himself in "The Spock Resonance", the November 5, 2015, episode of the CBS sitcom The Big Bang Theory, in which he interviewed Sheldon Cooper (Jim Parsons) for the documentary on his father, who made a voice cameo in the episode "The Transporter Malfunction" in the series' fifth season.

It had been stated that Quinto would provide narration for the documentary, but Adam Nimoy found that there were "so many archival interviews and voice recordings" that narration was not needed.

The documentary's first trailer was released April 13, 2016, and the theatrical trailer and poster on July 20.

== Release ==
A preliminary version of the film was screened on April 16, 2016, at the Tribeca Film Festival. It was followed by a panel composed of Adam Nimoy, Zachary Quinto, producer David Zappone, Access Hollywood and critic Scott Mantz, within Variety's Gordon Cox as moderator. The finished documentary's release was expected later in 2016.

On June 2, 2016, it was announced that the worldwide rights to the documentary had been acquired by Gravitas Ventures, and the film was scheduled for U.S. theatrical release and VOD day-and-date on September 9, one day after the 50th anniversary of the Original Series.

Since that date, the film has been available on iTunes, Vudu, Vimeo, several other TV providers, Netflix and Internet on Demand (national and international). It is also available as DVD and Blu-ray.

== Reception ==
For the Love of Spock received universal acclaim from critics, and holds a 100% rating on Rotten Tomatoes based on 30 reviews, with a weighted average of 7.34/10. Metacritic reports a score of 74/100 based on 8 critics, indicating "generally favorable" reviews.

Lance Ulanoff of Mashable said in his review that "There's no way to fit 83 years into a rather fast-paced 100 minutes. As a consequence, huge swaths of Nimoy's life and career are mentioned all-too-briefly ... This doesn't diminish For the Love of Spock. Instead, it keeps the narrative more firmly focused on Spock himself, and Nimoy's emotional connection to his craft and those around him." Frank Scheck in his review for The Hollywood Reporter said about the film, "That actor Leonard Nimoy lived a rich and full life is made vividly clear in Adam Nimoy's loving documentary about his father and his most famous, iconic role." Sarah Lewin of Space.com said that "The documentary explores the fans' love both as a destabilizing force in Adam Nimoy's life and as a powerful statement of the character's universality. Indeed, besides Spock and Nimoy himself, the fans are the third main character in the film."

== Awards ==
For the Love of Spock won the Audience Award for Best Documentary at 2016 Fantasia International Film Festival.
