= Leonard Nimoy =

American actor (1931–2015)

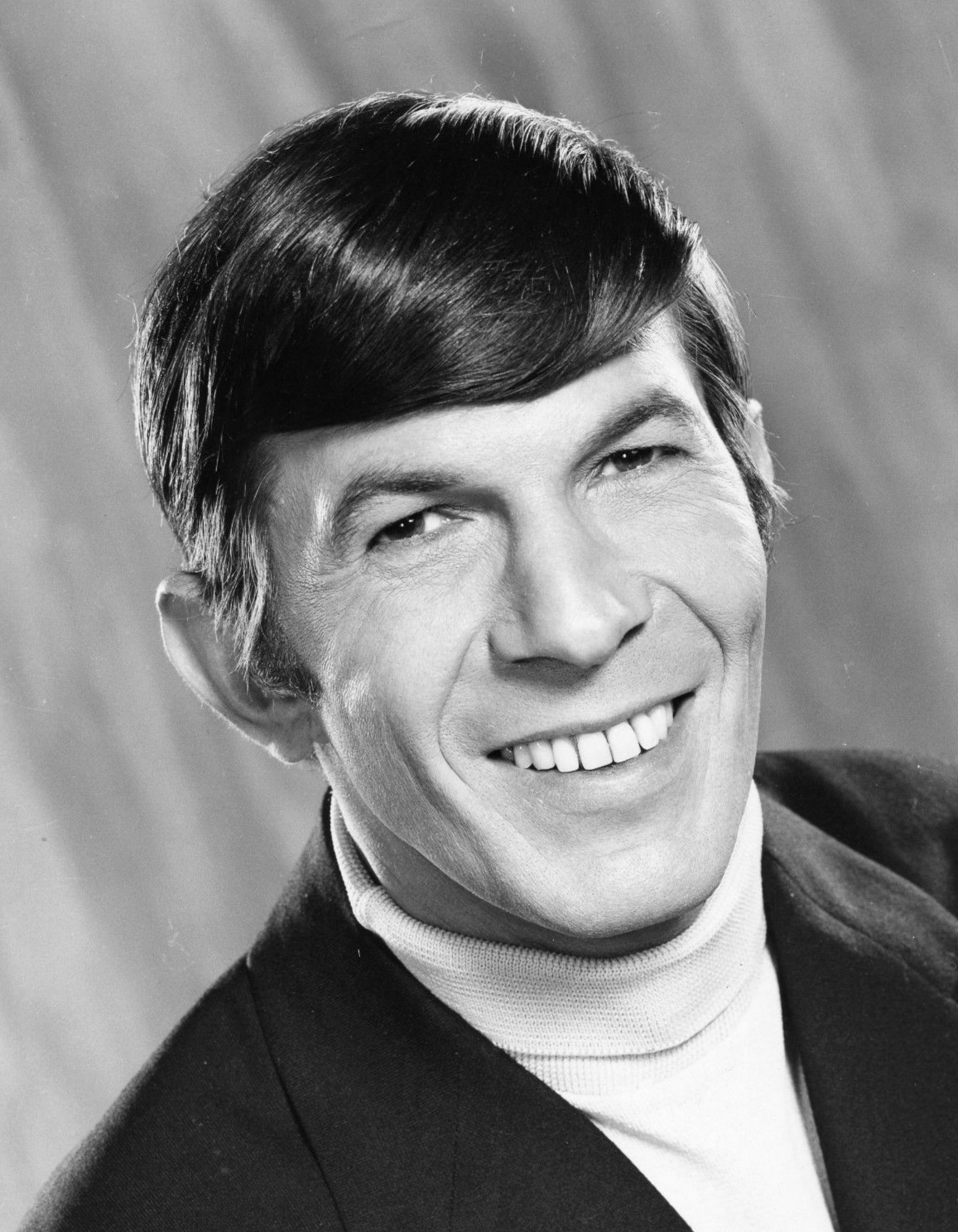
- Nimoy in 1973
- Born: Leonard Simon Nimoy; March 26, 1931; Boston, Massachusetts, U.S.
- Died: February 27, 2015 (aged 83); Los Angeles, California, U.S.
- Resting place: Hillside Memorial Park Cemetery
- Occupations: Actor; author; director; photographer; singer
- Years active: 1950–2015
- Television: Star Trek; Mission: Impossible
- Spouses: Sandra Zober (m. 1954; div. 1987); Susan Bay (m. 1989)
- Children: Julie; Adam
- Relatives: Jeff Nimoy (second cousin once removed); Aaron Bay-Schuck (stepson); Michael Bay (cousin-in-law); Jonah Nimoy (grandson)
- Military career
- Allegiance: United States
- Branch: United States Army
- Service years: 1953–1955
- Rank: Staff Sergeant
- Unit: Special Services
- Leonard Nimoy's voice for a documentary about the brain

Leonard Simon Nimoy (/ˈniːmɔɪ/ NEE-moy; March 26, 1931 – February 27, 2015) was an American actor and director, famous for playing Spock in the Star Trek franchise for over 40 years. This includes originating Spock in the original Star Trek series in 1966, then Star Trek: The Animated Series, the first six Star Trek films, Star Trek: The Next Generation, the 2009 Star Trek film, and Star Trek Into Darkness. Nimoy also directed films, including Star Trek III: The Search for Spock (1984), Star Trek IV: The Voyage Home (1986), and Three Men and a Baby (1987), and his career included roles in music videos and video games. In addition to acting and filmmaking, Nimoy was a photographer, author, singer, and songwriter.

Nimoy's acting career began during his early twenties, teaching acting classes in Hollywood and making minor film and television appearances throughout the 1950s. From 1953 to 1955, he served in the United States Army as a sergeant in the Special Services, an entertainment branch of the American military. He originated and developed Spock beginning with the 1965 Star Trek television pilot "The Cage" and 1966's "Where No Man Has Gone Before", through series' end in early 1969, followed by eight feature films and guest appearances in spin-offs. From 1967 to 1970, Nimoy had a music career with Dot Records, with his first and second albums mostly as Spock. After the original Star Trek series, Nimoy starred in Mission: Impossible for two seasons, hosted the documentary series In Search of..., appeared in Columbo, and made several well-received stage appearances.

Nimoy's portrayal of Spock made a significant cultural impact and earned him three Emmy Award nominations. His public profile as Spock was so strong that both his autobiographies, I Am Not Spock (1975) and I Am Spock (1995), were written from the viewpoint of coexistence with the character. Leonard Nimoy played the elder Spock, with Zachary Quinto portraying a younger Spock, in the 2009 Star Trek reboot film, directed by J. J. Abrams. In 2010, Nimoy announced that he was retiring from playing Spock, citing both his advanced age and the desire to give Quinto full media attention as the character. His final role as Spock (and his final role overall) was in the 2013 sequel, Star Trek Into Darkness.

Nimoy died in February 2015 after a long case of chronic obstructive pulmonary disease (COPD). His death was international news and was met with expressions of shock and grief by fans, Star Trek co-stars, scientists, celebrities, and the media. An asteroid was named 4864 Nimoy in his honor. For the Love of Spock (2016) was produced by his son Adam about his life and career, and Remembering Leonard Nimoy (2017) was produced by his daughter Julie about his illness.

== Early life ==
Leonard Simon Nimoy was born on March 26, 1931, in an Irish section of the West End of Boston, Massachusetts, to Jewish immigrants from Iziaslav, Ukraine. His parents left Iziaslav separately, his father first walking over the border into Poland while his mother and grandmother were smuggled out in a horse-drawn wagon by hiding under bales of hay. They reunited after arriving in the United States and later married in 1925. His mother, Dora Spinner (1904–1987), was a homemaker, and his father, Max Nimoy (1901–1987), owned a barbershop in the Mattapan section of Boston. He had an elder brother, Melvin (1926–2022).

As a child, Nimoy took miscellaneous jobs to supplement his family's income, including selling newspapers and greeting cards, shining shoes, or setting up chairs in theaters, and when he got older, selling vacuum cleaners. He began acting at the age of eight in a children's and neighborhood theater. His parents wanted him to attend college and pursue a stable career, or even learn to play the accordion, so he could always make a living, but his grandfather encouraged him to do what he then wanted to do most, which was acting. Nimoy realized he had an aptitude for singing, which he developed in his synagogue's choir. His singing during his bar mitzvah at age 13 was so good he was asked to repeat his performance the following week at another synagogue. William Shatner said, "He is still the only man I know whose voice was two bar mitzvahs good!"

His first major role was at 17, as Ralphie in an amateur production of Clifford Odets's Awake and Sing!, about the struggles of a matriarchal Jewish family similar to his during the Great Depression. He said, "Playing this teenage kid in this Jewish family that was so much like mine was amazing ... The same dynamics, the same tensions in the household." The role "lit a passion" that led to his acting career, with Nimoy saying "I never wanted to do anything else." Shatner has said that Nimoy also worked on local radio shows for children, often voice acting Bible stories:

Obviously, there was something symbolic about that. Many years later as Captain Kirk, I would be busy rescuing civilizations in distress on distant planets while Leonard's Mr. Spock would be examining the morality of man- and alienkind.

Nimoy took drama classes at Boston College, and after moving to Los Angeles, he used $600 he saved from selling vacuum cleaners to enroll at the Pasadena Playhouse, supporting himself by working as a theatre usher and a taxicab driver, and stocking vending machines. However, he was soon disillusioned and quit after six months, feeling that the acting skills he had already acquired from earlier roles were more advanced: "I thought, I have to study here three years in order to do this level of work, and I'm already doing better work".

He became a devotee of method acting concepts derived from the teachings of Konstantin Stanislavsky, realizing the stage allowed him to explore his original inspirations for acting: the "psychological, emotional, and physical territories of life that can't be done anywhere else". Between studies, he took a job at an ice cream parlor on the Sunset Strip.

In 1953, Nimoy enlisted in the United States Army Reserve at Fort McPherson Georgia, serving for 18 months until 1955, leaving as a staff sergeant. He had been in the Army Special Services, putting on shows which he wrote, narrated, and emceed. One of his soldiers was Ken Berry, whom he encouraged to go into acting as a civilian and helped contact agents. During that period, he directed and starred in A Streetcar Named Desire, with the Atlanta Theater Guild. (Note: In 2002, the Military Personnel Records Center reported that Nimoy's entire Army personnel file had been destroyed in the National Personnel Records Center fire of 1973. A reconstructed file, containing a pay sheet and some personal details, was then created and placed in the agency's security vault for high-profile military service records.) Soon after he was discharged, his wife Sandi was pregnant with their second child, and they rented an apartment while he became a cab driver in Los Angeles. He once picked up Senator John F. Kennedy at the Bel Air Hotel in 1956, before the Democratic Convention began on August 13. As the senator was not carrying any cash, Nimoy had to follow him into the Beverly Hilton to collect his $1.25 from someone Kennedy knew. He got a $1.75 tip.

== Acting career ==
=== Before and during Star Trek ===
In Kid Monk Baroni (1952)
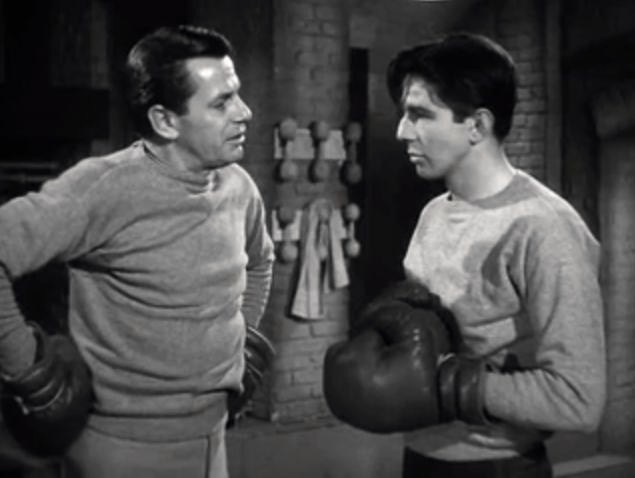

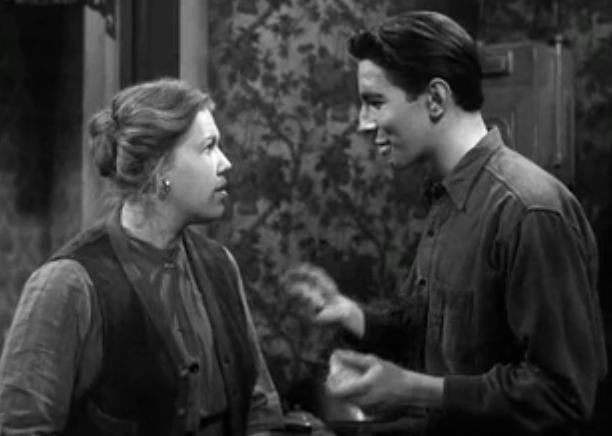
With Richard Rober (top) and Kathleen Freeman (bottom)

Nimoy spent more than a decade playing only small parts in B movies and the lead in one, along with a minor TV role. He believed his performance as the title role in the 1952 film Kid Monk Baroni would make him a star, but the film failed after a brief cinema showing. During his military career, the film gained a larger audience on television, and after his discharge he got steadier work portraying a "heavy", where his character used street weapons like switchblades and guns or had to threaten or attack people. He overcame his Boston accent, but realized his lean appearance made stardom unlikely.

He decided to be a supporting actor rather than take lead roles, an attitude he acquired from his childhood: "I'm a second child who was educated to the idea my older brother was to be given respect and not perturbed. I was not to upstage him [...] So my acting career was designed to be a supporting player, a character actor." He played more than 50 small parts in B movies, television series such as Perry Mason and Dragnet, and serials such as Zombies of the Stratosphere (1952), in which he played a Martian named Narab. To support a wife and two children, he often took other work, such as delivering newspapers, working in a pet shop, and driving cabs.

Nimoy played an army sergeant in the 1954 science fiction thriller Them! and a professor in the 1958 science fiction movie The Brain Eaters, and had a role in The Balcony (1963), a film adaptation of the Jean Genet play. With Vic Morrow, he co-produced Deathwatch, a 1965 English-language film version of Genet's play Haute Surveillance, adapted and directed by Morrow and starring Nimoy. The story deals with three prison inmates. Partly as a result of his role, he then taught drama classes to members of Synanon, a drug rehab center, explaining: "Give a little here and it always comes back".

He had guest roles in the Sea Hunt series from 1958 to 1960 and a minor role in the 1961 The Twilight Zone episode "A Quality of Mercy". He also appeared in the syndicated Highway Patrol starring Broderick Crawford, and as Luke Reid in the "Night of Decision" episode of the ABC/Warner Bros. western series Colt .45.

Nimoy appeared four times in ethnic roles on NBC's Wagon Train, the number one rated program of the 1961–1962 season. He portrayed Bernabe Zamora in "The Estaban Zamora Story" (1959), "Cherokee Ned" in "The Maggie Hamilton Story" (1960), Joaquin Delgado in "The Tiburcio Mendez Story" (1961), and Emeterio Vasquez in "The Baylor Crowfoot Story" (1962).

Nimoy appeared in numerous episodes of Gunsmoke, as well as in Steve Canyon (1959), Bonanza (1960), The Rebel (1960), Two Faces West (1961), Laramie (1961), Rawhide (1961), The Untouchables (1962), The Eleventh Hour (1962), Perry Mason (1963), Combat! (1963, 1965), Daniel Boone, The Outer Limits (1964), The Virginian (1963–1965; first working with Star Trek co-star DeForest Kelley in "Man of Violence", episode 14 of season 2, in 1963), and Get Smart (1966). He appeared in the 1995 Outer Limits series. He appeared on Gunsmoke in 1961 as Grice, in 1962 as Arnie, and in 1966 as John Walking Fox.

Nimoy and later Star Trek co-star William Shatner first worked together on an episode of the NBC spy series The Man from U.N.C.L.E., "The Project Strigas Affair" (1964). Their characters were from opposite sides of the Iron Curtain, though with his saturnine appearance, Nimoy played the villain and Shatner played a reluctant U.N.C.L.E. recruit. By then he had a good reputation in Hollywood as a character actor, and chose Star Trek over a role on Peyton Place.

On the stage, Nimoy played the lead role in a short run of Gore Vidal's Visit to a Small Planet in 1968 (shortly before the end of the Star Trek series) at the Pheasant Run Playhouse in St. Charles, Illinois.

=== Star Trek ===
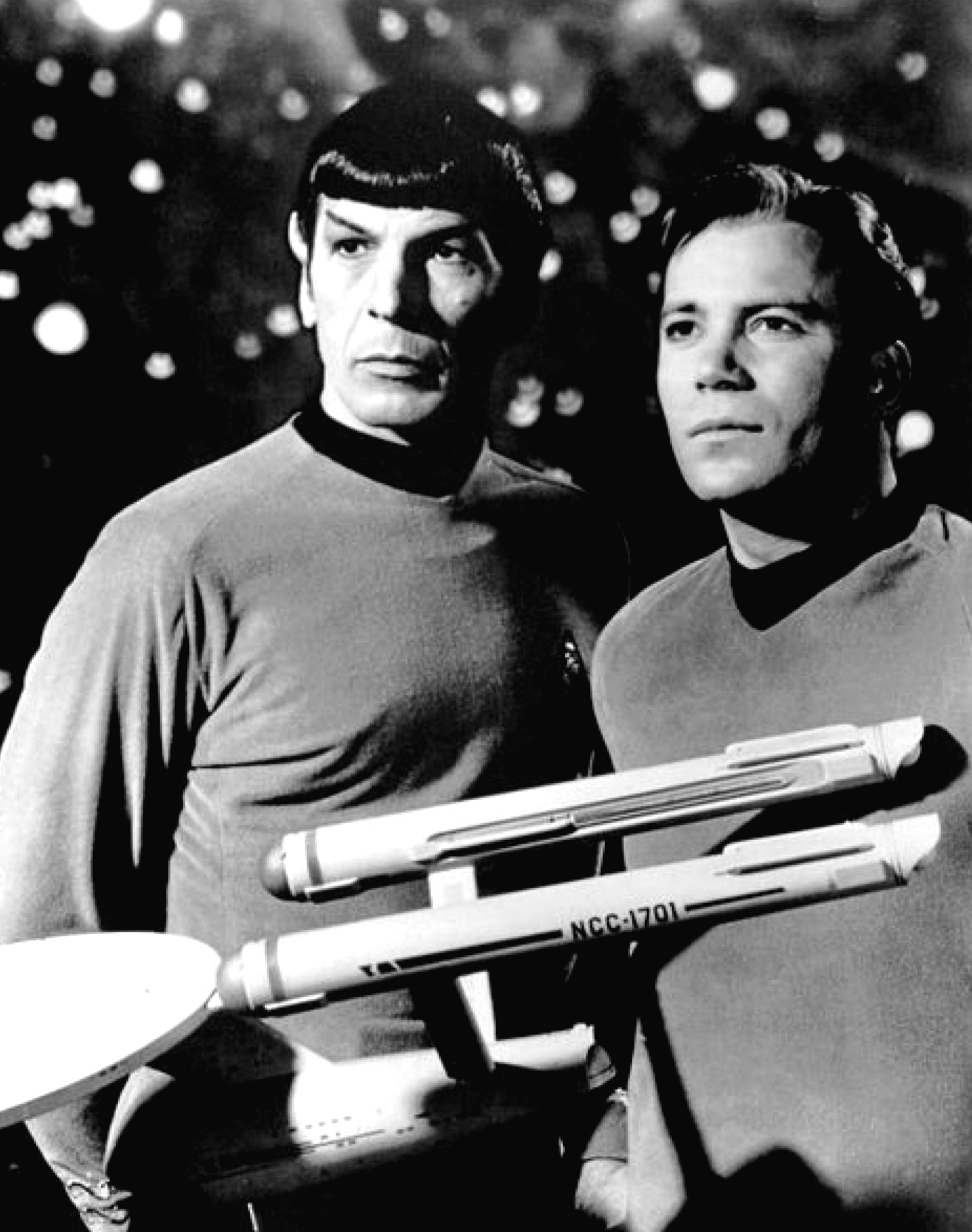
Publicity photo of Nimoy as Spock, alongside William Shatner as Captain James T. Kirk

Nimoy was best known for his portrayal of Spock, the half-human, half-Vulcan character he played on Star Trek from the first TV episode in 1966 to the film Star Trek Into Darkness in 2013. According to biographer Dennis Fischer, Spock was Nimoy's "most important role". Spock became an icon and one of the most popular alien characters ever featured on television. Viewers admired his composure and intellect and his ability to take on any task successfully. As a result, Nimoy's character "took the public by storm", nearly eclipsing the star of the series, William Shatner's Captain Kirk, adds Fischer. Nimoy was later credited for bringing "dignity and intelligence to one of the most revered characters in science fiction".

Nimoy and Shatner, who portrayed his commanding officer, became close friends during the series' television run, and were "like brothers", according to Shatner. Star Trek was broadcast from 1966 to 1969. For his role as Spock, Nimoy was nominated three times for an Emmy Award for Outstanding Supporting Actor in a Drama Series, and has long remained the only Star Trek actor nominated for an Emmy.

Among Spock's recognized and unique symbols Nimoy incorporated into the series is the Vulcan salute, which became identified with him in pop culture. Nimoy created the sign from his childhood memories of the way kohanim (Jewish priests) hold their hands when giving the Priestly Blessing. The accompanying spoken blessing is "Live long and prosper".

Nimoy conceived the "Vulcan nerve pinch", which he suggested as a replacement for the scripted knock out method of using the butt of his phaser. He wanted a more sophisticated way of rendering a person unconscious. Nimoy explained to the director that Spock had, per the story, attended the Vulcan Institute of Technology and had studied human anatomy. Spock possessed the ability to project a unique form of energy through his fingertips. Nimoy explained the idea of putting his hand on his neck and shoulder to Shatner, and they rehearsed it. Nimoy credits Shatner's acting during the "pinch" that sold the idea and made it work on screen.

His legacy as that character is key to the enjoyment of Star Trek. The way that Spock was used as a device for the writers to examine humanity and examine what it meant to be human, that's really what Star Trek was all about. And in finding Leonard Nimoy, they found the perfect person to portray that.

— Matt Atchity, editor-in-chief of Rotten Tomatoes

Nimoy reprised Spock in Star Trek: The Animated Series and two episodes of Star Trek: The Next Generation. When the new series Star Trek: Phase II was planned in the late 1970s, Nimoy was to be in only two of eleven episodes, but when the series was elevated to a feature film, he agreed to reprise his role. The first six Star Trek movies feature the original cast including Nimoy, who also directed two of the films, Star Trek III: The Search for Spock and Star Trek IV: The Voyage Home. He played the elder Spock in the 2009 Star Trek reboot film and briefly in the 2013 sequel, Star Trek Into Darkness, both directed by J. J. Abrams.

=== After Star Trek ===
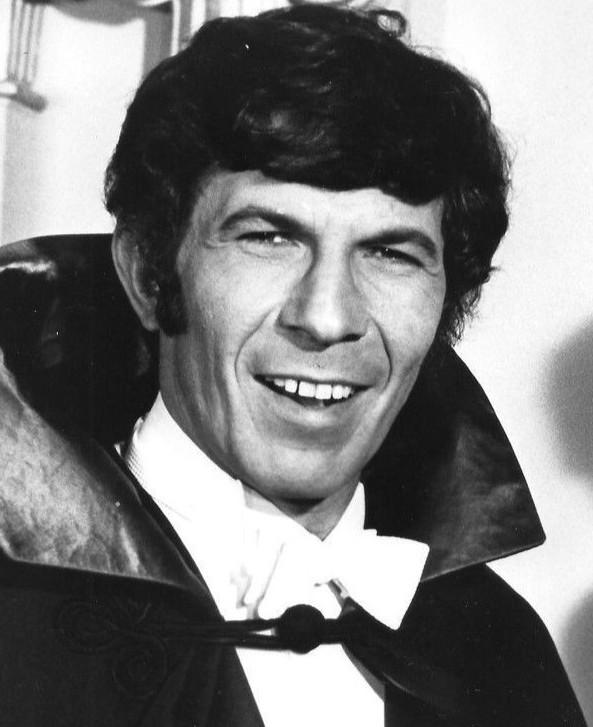
Nimoy in a Mission: Impossible photoshoot in 1970

Following Star Trek in 1969, Nimoy immediately joined the cast of the spy series Mission: Impossible, which was seeking a replacement for Martin Landau. Nimoy was cast in the role of Paris, an IMF agent who was an ex-magician and make-up expert, "The Great Paris". He played the role during seasons four and five from 1969 to 1971. Nimoy had been strongly considered as part of the initial cast for the show, but remained on Star Trek.

He co-starred with Yul Brynner and Richard Crenna in the Western movie Catlow (1971). He also had roles in two episodes of Rod Serling's Night Gallery (1972 and 1973) and Columbo (1973). He appeared in television films such as Assault on the Wayne (1970), Baffled! (1972), The Alpha Caper (1973), The Missing Are Deadly (1974), Seizure: The Story Of Kathy Morris (1980), and Marco Polo (1982). He received an Emmy Award nomination for best supporting actor for the television film A Woman Called Golda (1982), for playing the role of Morris Meyerson, Golda Meir's husband, opposite Ingrid Bergman as Golda in her final role.

In 1975, Nimoy filmed an opening introduction to Ripley's World of the Unexplained museum located at Gatlinburg, Tennessee, and Fisherman's Wharf at San Francisco, California. From 1976 to 1982, he hosted and narrated the television series In Search of ..., which investigated paranormal or unexplained events or subjects. In 2000–2001 he hosted CNBC TV series The Next Wave With Leonard Nimoy, which explored how e-businesses were integrating with technology and the Internet. He also had a character part as a psychiatrist in Philip Kaufman's 1978 remake of Invasion of the Body Snatchers.

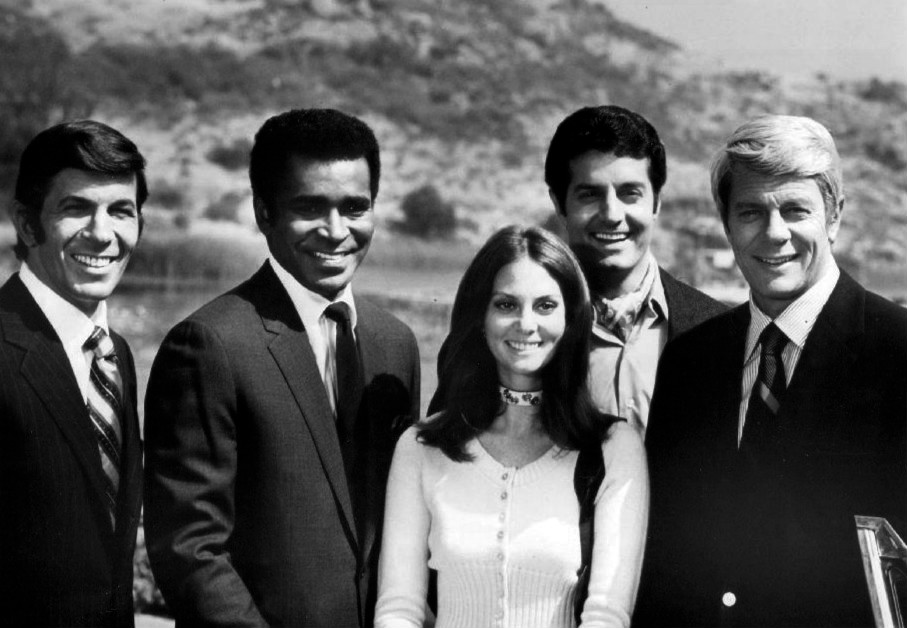
Nimoy with Mission: Impossible cast in 1970

=== Stage ===
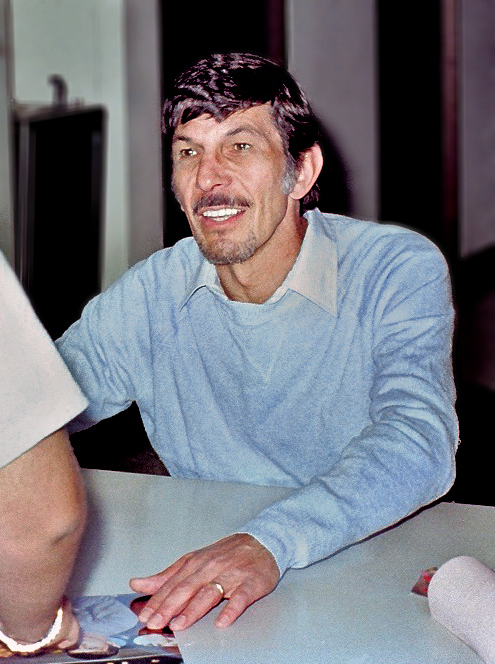
Nimoy at a 1980 sci-fi convention

Nimoy won acclaim for a series of stage roles. In 1971 he played the starring role of Tevye in Fiddler on the Roof, which toured for eight weeks. Having performed in the Yiddish theater as a young man, he said the part was like a "homecoming" for him because his parents, like Tevye, also came from a shtetl in Russia and could relate to the play when they saw him in it. Later that year he starred as Arthur Goldman in The Man in the Glass Booth at the Old Globe Theater in San Diego.

He starred as Randle McMurphy in One Flew Over the Cuckoo's Nest in 1974, one year prior to its release as a feature film, with Jack Nicholson in the same role. During the run of the play, Nimoy took over as its director and wanted his character to be "rough and tough," and insisted on having tattoos. The costumer for the show, Sharon White, was amused: "That was sort of an intimate thing. ... Here I am with Mr. Spock, for god's sakes, and I am painting pictures on his arms."

In 1975, Nimoy toured with and played the title role in the Royal Shakespeare Company's Sherlock Holmes. A number of authors have perceived parallels between the rational Holmes and the character of Spock, and it became a running theme in Star Trek fan clubs. Star Trek writer Nicholas Meyer said that "the link between Spock and Holmes was obvious to everyone." Meyer gives a few examples, including a scene in Star Trek VI: The Undiscovered Country, in which Spock quotes directly from a Doyle book and credits Holmes as a forefather to the logic he was espousing. In addition, the connection was implied in Star Trek: The Next Generation, which paid homage to both Holmes and Spock.

By 1977, when Nimoy played Martin Dysart in Equus on Broadway, he had played 13 important roles in 27 cities, including Tevye, Malvolio in Twelfth Night, and Randle McMurphy in One Flew Over the Cuckoo's Nest. In 1981, Nimoy starred in Vincent, a one-man show which he wrote and published as a book in 1984. The audio recording of the play is available on DVD under the title, Van Gogh Revisited. It was based on the life of artist Vincent van Gogh, in which Nimoy played Van Gogh's brother Theo. Other plays included Oliver!, at The Melody Top Theater in Milwaukee, 6 Rms Riv Vu opposite Sandy Dennis, in Florida, Full Circle with Bibi Anderson on Broadway and in Washington, D.C. He was in Camelot, The King and I, Caligula, The Four Poster, and My Fair Lady.

=== Star Trek films ===
After Paramount agreed to settle a lawsuit by Nimoy for Star Trek merchandise royalties, he agreed to join Star Trek: The Motion Picture, the first in the Star Trek film series. By 1986, Nimoy had earned more than half a million dollars in royalties.

=== Other roles ===
==== Voice acting ====
In 1975, Nimoy's renditions of Ray Bradbury's "There Will Come Soft Rains" and "Usher II", both from The Martian Chronicles (1950), were released on Caedmon Records. During 1980, Nimoy hosted the Friday "Adventure Night" segment of the radio drama series Mutual Radio Theater, heard via the Mutual Broadcasting System. In 1986, Nimoy lent his voice to the character Galvatron in the animated film The Transformers: The Movie.

In Bradbury's 1993 animated TV film The Halloween Tree, Nimoy was the voice of Mr. Moundshroud, the children's guide. Nimoy lent his voice as narrator to the 1994 IMAX documentary film, Destiny in Space, showcasing film-footage of space from nine Space Shuttle missions over four years time. In 1999, he voiced the narration of the English version of the Sega Dreamcast game Seaman and promoted Y2K educational films.

Together with John de Lancie, who portrayed Q in the Star Trek franchise, Nimoy created Alien Voices, an audio-production venture that specializes in audio dramatizations. Among the works jointly narrated by the pair are The Time Machine, Journey to the Center of the Earth, The Lost World, The Invisible Man, The First Men in the Moon, and several television specials for the Sci-Fi Channel. In an interview published on the official Star Trek website, Nimoy said that Alien Voices was discontinued because the series did not sell well enough to recoup costs.

In 2001, Nimoy voiced the Atlantean King Kashekim Nedakh in the Disney animated feature Atlantis: The Lost Empire. Nimoy provided a comprehensive series of voice-overs for the 2005 computer game Civilization IV. In the television series The Next Wave he interviewed people about technology. He hosts the documentary film The Once and Future Griffith Observatory. Nimoy and his wife, Susan Bay-Nimoy, were major supporters of the Griffith Observatory's historic 2002–2004 expansion.

In 2009, he voiced "The Zarn" in the television-based movie Land of the Lost. He voiced the Star Trek Online massive multiplayer online game, released in February 2010, and Kingdom Hearts Birth by Sleep as Xehanort, the series' leading villain. Tetsuya Nomura, the director of Birth by Sleep, said Nimoy was chosen for the role specifically because of his role as Spock, to play opposite Mark Hamill, famous for his role as Luke Skywalker in Star Wars, as Nomura was a fan of both series and wanted to pit them against each other. Nimoy reprised this role for Kingdom Hearts 3D: Dream Drop Distance in 2012. After his death in 2015, Nimoy was replaced in the role of Xehanort by Rutger Hauer. Hauer died in 2019 and was succeeded by Christopher Lloyd, who also appeared in Star Trek III: The Search for Spock.

Nimoy voiced Sentinel Prime in the 2011 film Transformers: Dark of the Moon. He was a frequent and popular reader for Selected Shorts, an ongoing series of programs at Symphony Space in New York City (that also tours around the country) which features actors, and sometimes authors, reading works of short fiction. The programs are broadcast on radio and available on websites through Public Radio International, National Public Radio and WNYC radio. Nimoy was honored by Symphony Space with the renaming of the Thalia Theater as the Leonard Nimoy Thalia Theater.

==== Special appearances ====
From 1982 to 1987, Nimoy hosted the children's educational show Standby...Lights! Camera! Action! on Nickelodeon. He was an occasional voice actor in animated feature films, including the character of Galvatron in The Transformers: The Movie in 1986. He narrated the 1991 CBS paranormal series Haunted Lives: True Ghost Stories. In 1994, he voiced Dr. Jekyll and Mr. Hyde in The Pagemaster. In 1998, he had a leading role as Mustapha Mond in Brave New World, a TV-movie version of Aldous Huxley's 1932 novel.

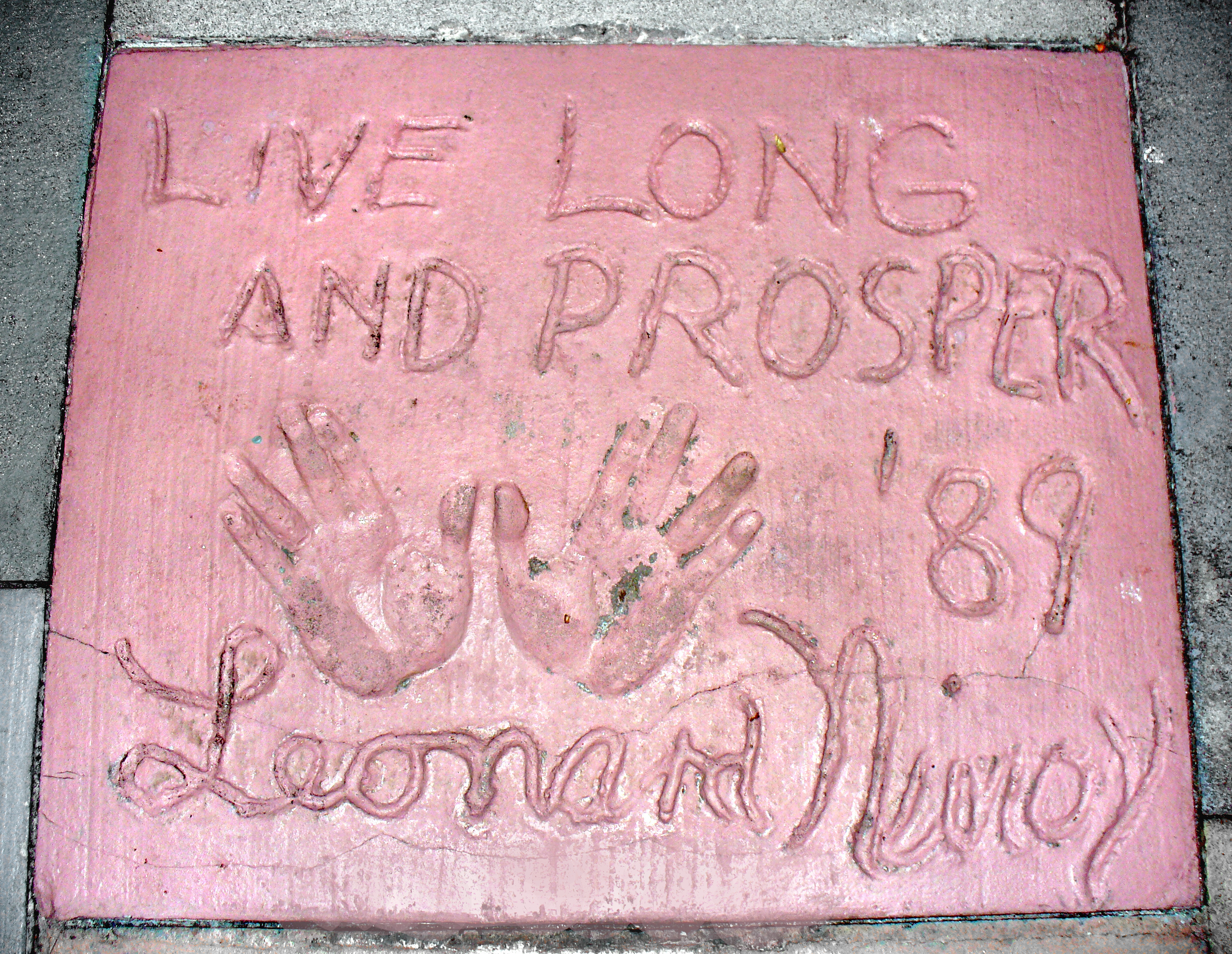
Handprints of Leonard Nimoy in front of Mickey & Minnie's Runaway Railway at Walt Disney World's Disney's Hollywood Studios theme park

From 1994 to 1997, he narrated the Ancient Mysteries series on A&E including "The Sacred Water of Lourdes" and "Secrets of the Romanovs". He appeared in advertising in the United Kingdom for the computer company Time Computers in the late 1990s. In 1997, he played the prophet Samuel, alongside Nathaniel Parker, in The Bible Collection movie David. He appeared in several popular television series, including Futurama and The Simpsons, both as himself and as Spock. In 2000, he provided on-camera hosting and introductions for 45 half-hour episodes of the anthology series Our 20th Century on the AEN TV Network. The series covers world news, sports, entertainment, technology, and fashion using original archive news clips from 1930 to 1975 from the National Archives in Washington, D.C. and other private archival sources.

In 2001, Nimoy appeared on the television show Becker, where he played Dr. Emmett Fowler, a professor who cannot recall his former student.

Nimoy played the recurring enigmatic character of Dr. William Bell on the television show Fringe. Nimoy opted for the role after previously working with Abrams, Roberto Orci and Alex Kurtzman on the 2009 Star Trek film and offered another opportunity to work with this production team again. Nimoy also was interested in the series, which he saw was an intelligent mixture of science and science fiction, and continued to guest star through the show's fourth season, even after his stated 2012 retirement from acting. Nimoy's first appearance as Bell was in the Season 1 finale, "There's More Than One of Everything", which explored the possible existence of a parallel universe. In the May 9, 2009, episode of Saturday Night Live, Nimoy appeared as a surprise guest in the Weekend Update segment with Zachary Quinto and Chris Pine, who play the young Spock and Kirk in the Star Trek which had just premiered days earlier. In the sketch, the three actors attempt to appease long-time Trekkers by assuring them the new film would be true to the original Star Trek.

==== Producer ====
In 1991, Nimoy starred in Never Forget, which he co-produced with Robert B. Radnitz. The movie was about a pro bono publico lawsuit by an attorney on behalf of Mel Mermelstein, played by Nimoy as an Auschwitz survivor, against a group of organizations engaged in Holocaust denial. Nimoy said he experienced a strong "sense of fulfillment" from doing the film. In 2007, he produced the play, Shakespeare's Will by Canadian Playwright Vern Thiessen. The one-woman show starred Jeanmarie Simpson as Shakespeare's wife, Anne Hathaway. The production was directed by Nimoy's wife, Susan Bay.

=== Semi-retirement ===
In April 2010, Nimoy announced that he was retiring from playing Spock, citing both his advanced age and the desire to give Zachary Quinto full media attention as the character. Kingdom Hearts: Birth by Sleep was to be his final performance; however, in February 2011, he announced his intent to return to Fringe and reprise his role as William Bell. Nimoy continued voice acting during retirement; his appearance in the third season of Fringe includes his voice (his character appears only in animated scenes), and he provided the voice of Sentinel Prime in Transformers: Dark of the Moon. In May 2011, he made a cameo appearance in the alternate version music video of "The Lazy Song" by Bruno Mars. Aaron Bay-Schuck, the Atlantic Records executive who signed Mars to the label, is Nimoy's stepson.

Nimoy provided the voice of Spock as a guest star in a Season 5 episode of the CBS sitcom The Big Bang Theory titled "The Transporter Malfunction", which aired on March 29, 2012. Also in 2012, Nimoy reprised his role of William Bell in Fringe for the fourth season episodes "Letters of Transit" and "Brave New World" parts 1 and 2. He reprised his role as Master Xehanort in the 2012 video game Kingdom Hearts 3D: Dream Drop Distance. On August 30, 2012, he narrated a satirical segment about Mitt Romney's life on Comedy Central's The Daily Show with Jon Stewart. In 2013, he reprised his role as Ambassador Spock in a cameo appearance in Star Trek Into Darkness.

== Other career work ==
=== Photography ===
Nimoy's interest in photography began in childhood; for the rest of his life, he owned a camera he had rebuilt at the age of 13. During the 1970s, he studied photography at the University of California, Los Angeles. His photography studies at UCLA occurred after Star Trek and Mission: Impossible while he was seriously considering changing careers. His work has been exhibited at the R. Michelson Galleries in Northampton, Massachusetts and the Massachusetts Museum of Contemporary Art.

=== Directing ===
Nimoy's directorial debut was in 1973, with the "Death on a Barge" segment for an episode of Night Gallery during its final season. In the early 1980s, he resumed directing consistently, including television and film.

Nimoy began feature film directing in 1984 with Star Trek III: The Search for Spock, the third in the film series. He directed the second most successful movie (critically and financially) in the franchise, Star Trek IV: The Voyage Home (1986), and then Three Men and a Baby, the highest-grossing film of 1987. These successes made him a star director. He directed The Good Mother (1988) and Funny About Love (1990). In 1994 he directed his last feature film, Holy Matrimony. His final directorial credit was "Killshot", the 1995 pilot episode for Deadly Games, a short-lived science-fiction television series.

At a press conference promoting the 2009 Star Trek movie, he said he had no further plans or ambition to direct although he enjoyed it.

=== Writing ===
Nimoy authored two volumes of autobiography. The first, I Am Not Spock (1975), caused some fans to assume that he was distancing himself from the Spock character. In the book, Nimoy conducts dialogues between himself and Spock and describes the identity crisis that he felt throughout his career.

I went through a definite identity crisis. The question was whether to embrace Mr. Spock or to fight the onslaught of public interest. I realize now that I really had no choice in the matter. Spock and Star Trek were very much alive and there wasn't anything that I could do to change that.

In the second volume, I Am Spock (1995), Nimoy wrote that he finally realized his years of portraying the Spock character had led to a much greater identification between the fictional character and himself. Nimoy had much input into how Spock would act in certain situations, and conversely Nimoy's contemplation of how Spock acted gave him cause to think about things in a way he never would have, had he not portrayed the character. Nimoy maintained that in some meaningful sense he had merged with Spock while distancing between fact and fiction. In 2014, the audiobook version of I Am Spock, read by Nimoy, was published.

He composed several volumes of poetry, some published along with a number of his photographs. A later poetic volume titled A Lifetime of Love: Poems on the Passages of Life was published in 2002. His poetry can be found in the Contemporary Poets index of The HyperTexts. Nimoy adapted and starred in the one-man play Vincent (1981), based on the play Van Gogh (1979) by Phillip Stephens.

In 1995, Nimoy was involved in the production of Primortals, a comic book series published by Tekno Comix about first contact with aliens, which had arisen from a discussion he had with Isaac Asimov. There was a novelization by Steve Perry.

=== Music ===
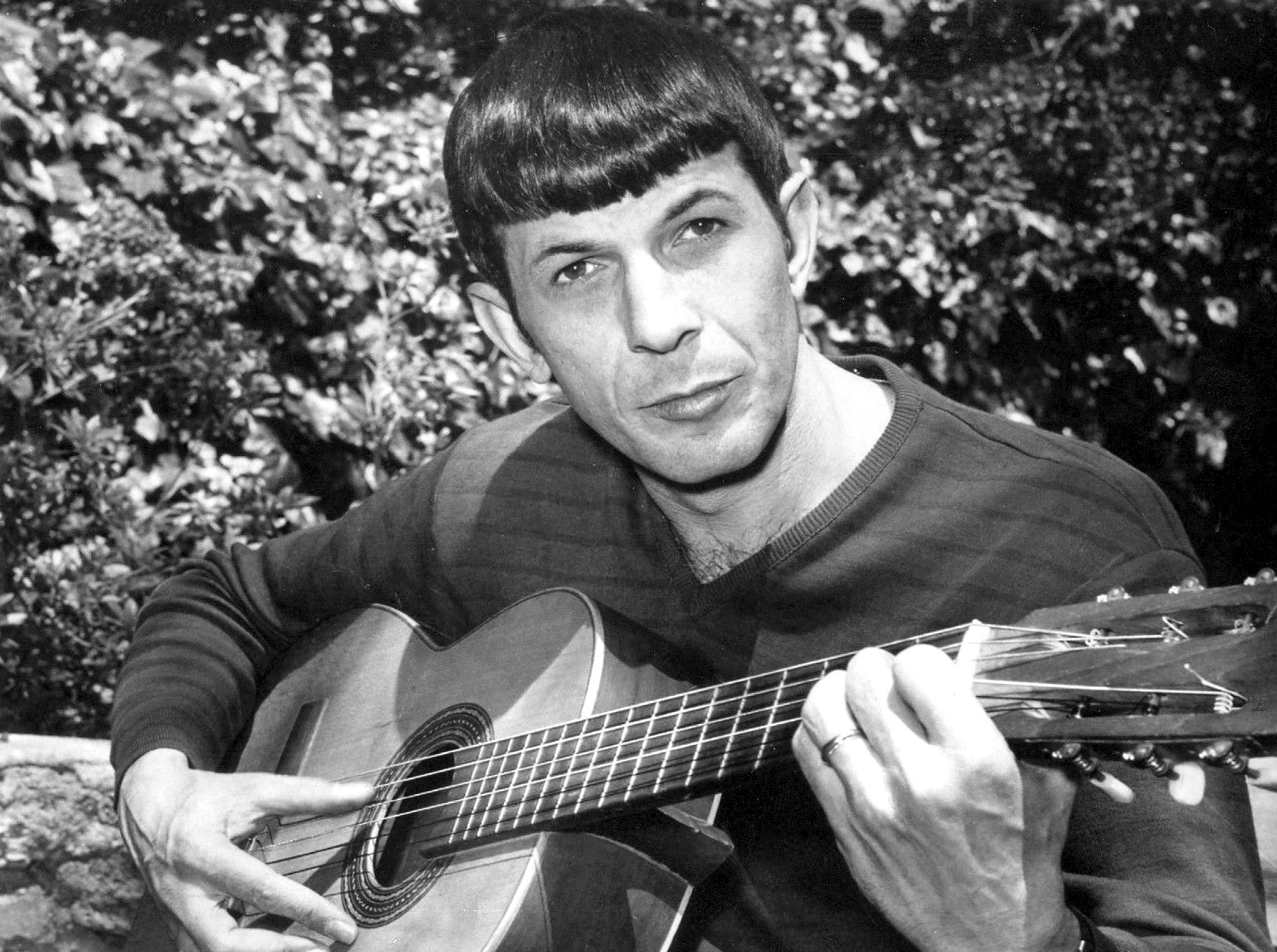
Nimoy playing guitar in 1967

In December 1966, when it became apparent that the original Star Trek was developing a strong following in spite of low Nielsen ratings, Dot Records approached the producers of the show. The result was the signing of Nimoy to that label. Dot Records was a subsidiary of Paramount Pictures, and both Paramount and Desilu—the studio producing Star Trek—were acquired by Gulf+Western: first Paramount in 1966, and then Desilu in 1967. So after the merger of the two companies, Nimoy wound up working for Paramount both as an actor (from 1966 to 1971) and singer (from 1967 to 1970), doing two television series (Star Trek and Mission: Impossible) and five albums. Nimoy later recorded a few spoken word albums and contributed narration to albums such as Whales Alive.

Nimoy's voice appeared in sampled form on a song by the pop band Information Society in the late Eighties. The song, "What's on Your Mind (Pure Energy)" (released in 1988), reached No. 3 on the US Pop charts, and No. 1 on the Dance charts.

Nimoy played the part of the chauffeur in the 1985 music video of The Bangles' cover version of "Going Down to Liverpool". He also appeared in the alternate music video for the song "The Lazy Song" by pop artist Bruno Mars.

== Personal life ==
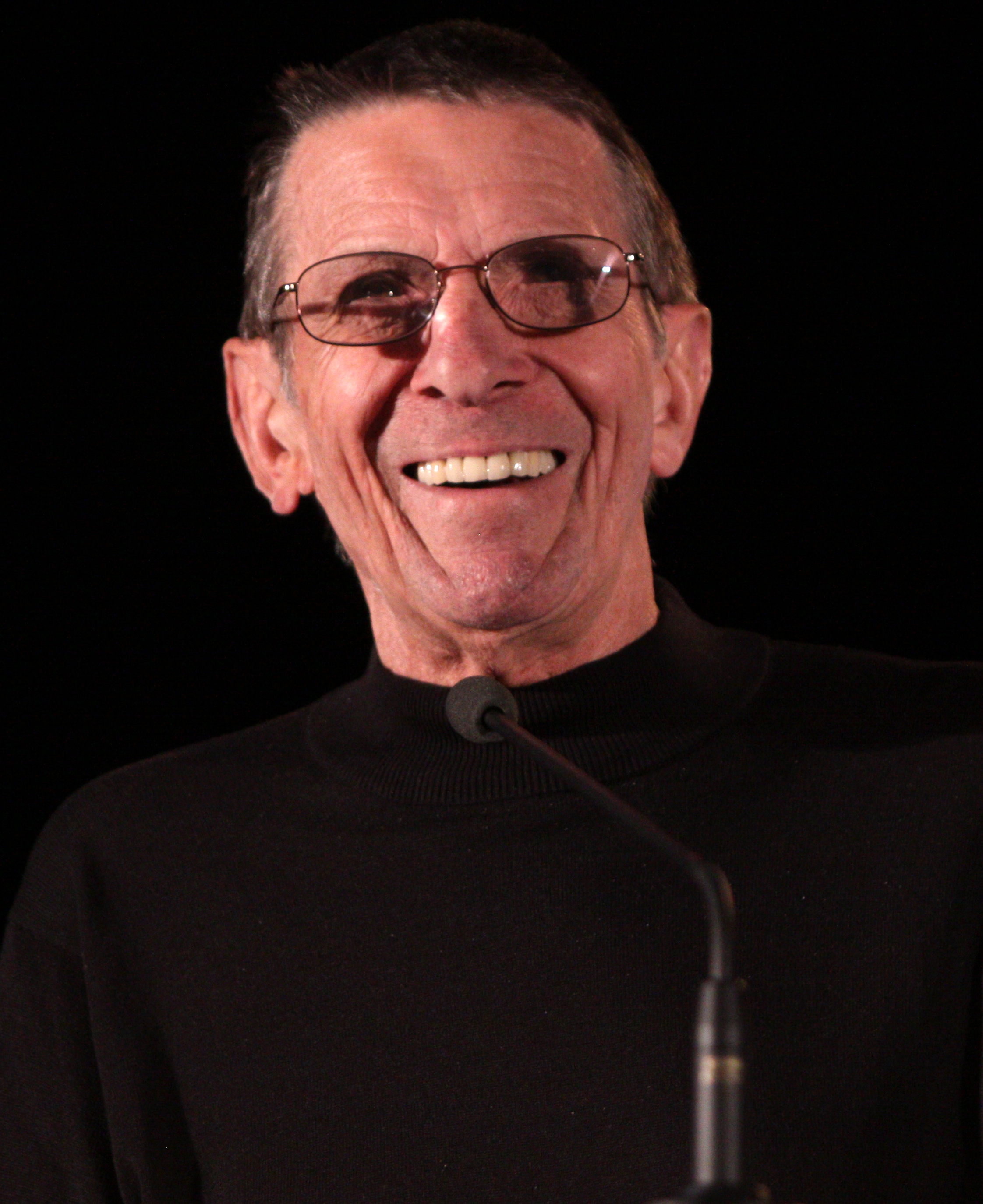
Nimoy at the 2011 Phoenix Comicon

Nimoy was long active in the Jewish community, and could speak and read Yiddish. In 1997, he narrated the documentary A Life Apart: Hasidism in America, about the various sects of Hasidic Orthodox Jews. In October 2002, Nimoy published The Shekhina Project, a photographic study exploring the feminine aspect of God's presence, inspired by Kabbalah. Reactions have varied from enthusiastic support to open condemnation. Nimoy said objections to Shekhina did not bother or surprise him, but he smarted at the stridency of the Orthodox protests, and was saddened at the attempt to control thought.

Nimoy was married twice. In 1954, he married Sandra Zober (1927–2011), an actress; they had two children: film producer and director Julie, and director Adam. After 32 years of marriage, he reportedly left Sandra on her 56th birthday and divorced her in 1987. On New Year's Day 1989, Nimoy married his second wife, actress Susan Bay, cousin of director Michael Bay.

After two years of part-time study, in 1977 Nimoy earned an MA in education from Antioch College. In 2000, he received an honorary doctorate from Antioch University in Ohio, awarded for activism in Holocaust remembrance, the arts, and the environment. In 2012, he received an honorary doctorate of humane letters from Boston University.

In the 2001 documentary film Mind Meld, in which Leonard Nimoy and William Shatner discuss their acting careers and personal lives, Nimoy revealed that he had become an alcoholic while working on Star Trek and ended up in drug rehabilitation. William Shatner, in his 2008 book Up Till Now: The Autobiography, spoke about how later in their lives, Nimoy tried to help Shatner's alcoholic wife, Nerine Kidd.

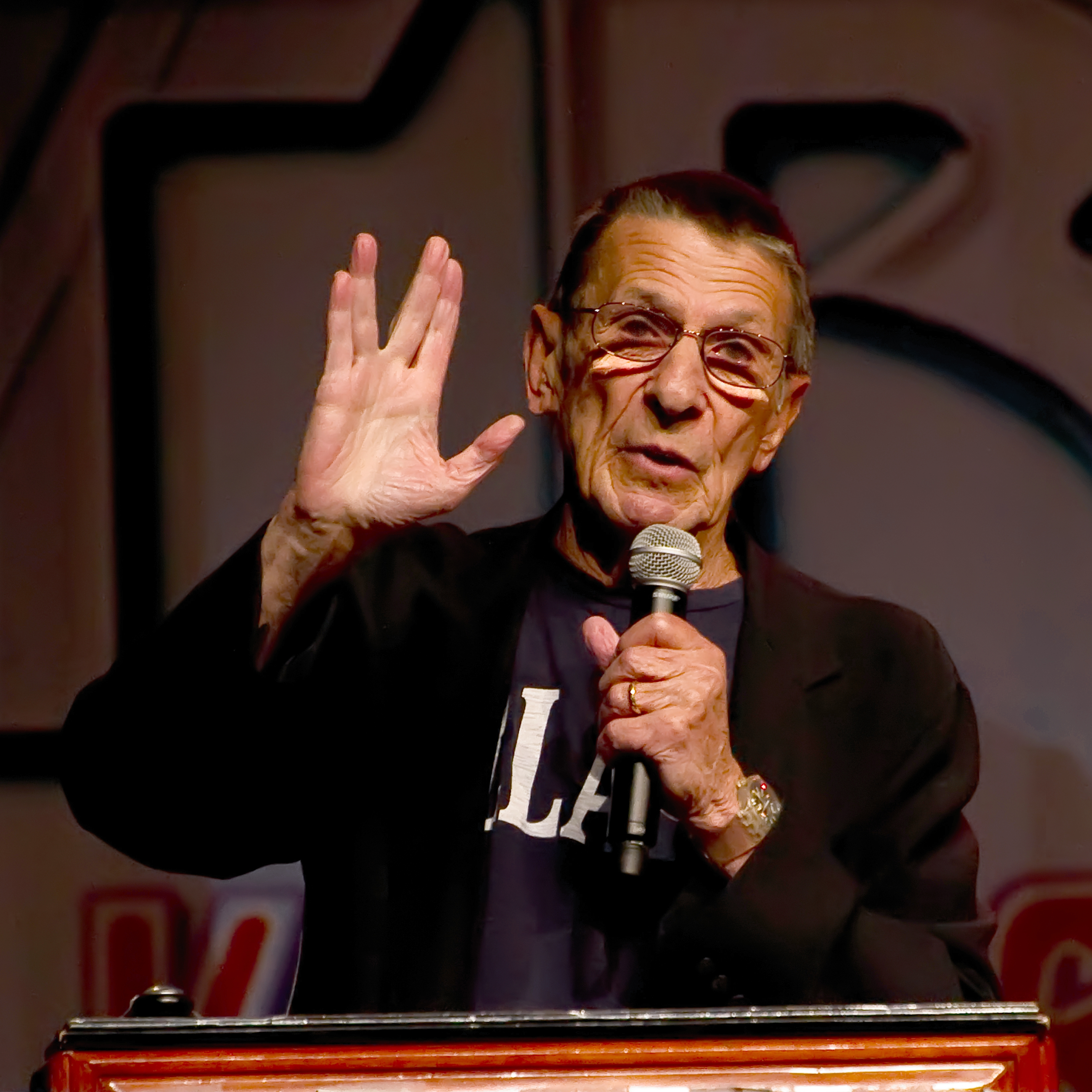
Nimoy giving the Vulcan salute in 2011

Nimoy said that the character of Spock, which he played twelve to fourteen hours a day, five days a week, influenced his personality in his private life. Each weekend during the original run of the series, he would be in character throughout Saturday and into Sunday, behaving more like Spock than himself—more logical, more rational, more thoughtful, less emotional, and finding calm in every situation. It was only on Sunday in the early afternoon that Spock's influence on his behavior diminished enough to allow him to feel more himself again—only to start the cycle over again on Monday morning. Years after the show, he observed Vulcan speech patterns, social attitudes, patterns of logic, and emotional suppression in his own behavior.

Nimoy was a private pilot and had owned an airplane. The Space Foundation bestowed to him the 2010 Douglas S. Morrow Public Outreach Award for creating a positive role model that inspired countless viewers to learn more about the universe.

Nimoy endorsed Democratic presidential candidate Michael Dukakis in the 1988 presidential election.

In 2009, Nimoy was honored by his childhood hometown when the Office of Mayor Thomas Menino proclaimed the date of November 14, 2009, as "Leonard Nimoy Day" in the City of Boston.

In 2014, Walter Koenig revealed that Nimoy personally and successfully advocated to the show's producers for equal pay for Nichelle Nichols's work on Star Trek. This incident was confirmed by Nimoy in a Trekmovie interview, and happened during his years at Desilu.

Nimoy has a star on the Hollywood Walk of Fame. On June 2, 2015, the asteroid 4864 Nimoy was named after him.

== Illness and death ==
In January 2014, Nimoy revealed publicly that he had been diagnosed with chronic obstructive pulmonary disease (COPD), a condition he attributed to a smoking addiction he had quit about 30 years earlier. On February 19, 2015, having been in and out of hospitals for several months, Nimoy was taken to UCLA Medical Center for chest pains.

On February 25, 2015, Nimoy fell into a coma, and died of complications from COPD at his home in the Bel Air neighborhood of Los Angeles on the morning of February 27, 2015 at the age of 83. Adam Nimoy said that as his father came closer to death, "he mellowed out. He made his family a priority and his career became secondary." A few days before his death, Nimoy shared some of his poetry on Twitter: "A life is like a garden. Perfect moments can be had, but not preserved, except in memory. LLAP". It was his final tweet.

He was buried at Hillside Memorial Park Cemetery in Los Angeles on March 1, 2015. The service was attended by nearly 300 family members, friends, and former colleagues, including Zachary Quinto, Chris Pine, and J. J. Abrams. Though William Shatner did not attend, he was represented by his daughters.

=== Personal tributes ===
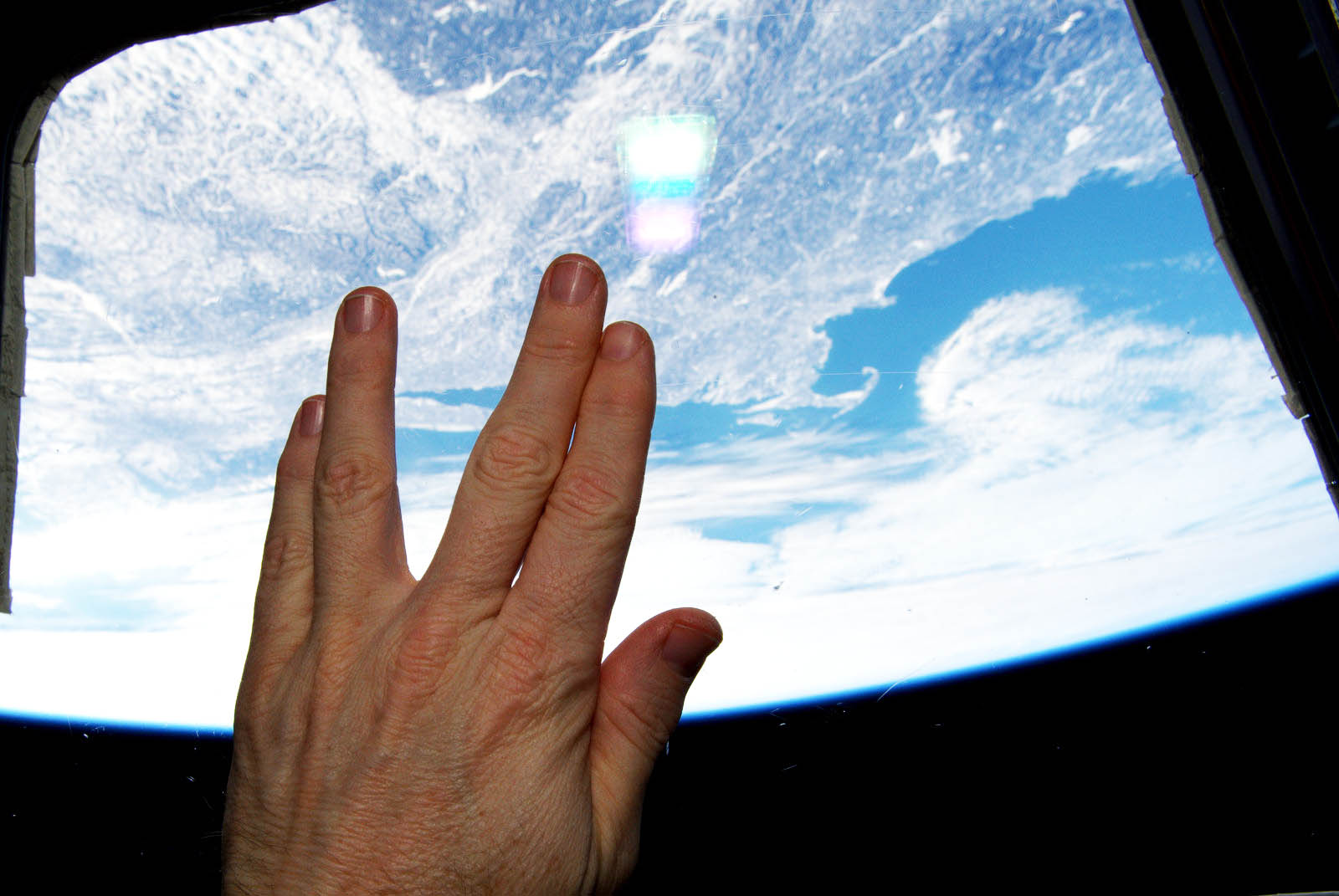
NASA Astronaut Terry W. Virts shot a photo of the Vulcan salute from the International Space Station, in orbit above Nimoy's home town of Boston on February 28, 2015.

Cast members of Star Trek who had worked alongside Nimoy gave personal tributes after his death. William Shatner wrote, "I loved him like a brother. ... We will all miss his humor, his talent, and his capacity to love." George Takei called him an "extraordinarily talented man" and a "very decent human being". Walter Koenig said that after working with him, he discovered Nimoy's "compassion, his intelligence and his humanity". Nichelle Nichols noted that Nimoy's integrity, passion and devotion as an actor "helped transport Star Trek into television history." Quinto, who portrayed Spock as a young man in Star Trek and Star Trek Into Darkness, wrote, "My heart is broken. I love you profoundly, my dear friend. And I will miss you every day."

U.S. president Barack Obama, who had met Nimoy in 2007, remembered him as "a lifelong lover of the arts and humanities, a supporter of the sciences, generous with his talent and his time". Former NASA astronaut Buzz Aldrin called Nimoy "a fellow space traveler because he helped make the journey into the final frontier accessible to us all".

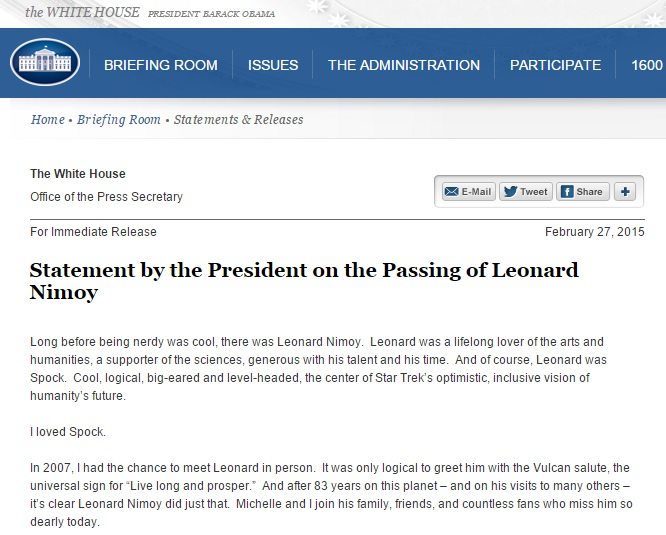
Statement by United States president Barack Obama on Nimoy's death

The Big Bang Theory, which made frequent references to Spock, and for which Nimoy voiced one episode, paid tribute to him after his death. Creator Chuck Lorre's vanity card at the end of the Season 8 episode, "The Colonization Application" (airing on March 5), featured a picture of Nimoy with the caption, "The impact you had on our show and on our lives is everlasting."

The 136th episode of the web series Angry Video Game Nerd created by and starring James Rolfe, which covered Seaman, was dedicated to Nimoy.

As part of a campaign for the 2016 feature film Star Trek Beyond, aimed at benefiting several charities, Zachary Quinto and other cast members posted a video tribute to Nimoy, and the film itself paid tribute to him. Its director, Justin Lin, explained: "It's something you'll see in the film. It obviously affected everybody, because he's been a big part of our lives. There's an attempt to acknowledge that in some way."

Adam Nimoy directed a biographical documentary on his father, For the Love of Spock, which Quinto narrated and with which Shatner was also involved. For charity, Shatner used selfies made by Nimoy's fans to create an online tribute mosaic of the Vulcan salute.

In June 2015, the Jet Propulsion Laboratory named a 10 km (6.2 miles)-wide asteroid 4864 Nimoy, originally discovered in 1988, in the Solar System's main asteroid belt.

Shatner wrote a book about his friendship with Nimoy titled Leonard: My Fifty Year Friendship with a Remarkable Man, released on February 16, 2016.

In April 2017, a biographical documentary about his illness, Remembering Leonard Nimoy was released, produced by his daughter Julie.

In front of the Boston Museum of Science—where Nimoy voiced the pre-show sound test and introductory film for the Mugar Omni Theater for over three decades following its 1987 opening—a memorial to Nimoy is planned for installation, near where he grew up in the West End of Boston. The monumental sculpture will be a larger-than-life representation of a hand displaying his iconic "live long and prosper" gesture. As of November 2026, the project is 79% funded.

== Awards and nominations ==
Year	Association	Category	Work	Result
1968	Primetime Emmy Awards	Outstanding Supporting Actor in a Drama Series	Star Trek: The Original Series	Nominated
1969	Primetime Emmy Awards	Outstanding Supporting Actor in a Drama Series	Star Trek: The Original Series	Nominated
1970	Primetime Emmy Awards	Outstanding Continued Performance by an Actor in a Supporting Role in a Series	Star Trek: The Original Series	Nominated
1978	Saturn Awards	Best Supporting Actor	Invasion of the Body Snatchers	Nominated
1979	Saturn Awards	Best Supporting Actor	Star Trek: The Motion Picture	Nominated
1982	Primetime Emmy Awards	Outstanding Supporting Actor in a Limited Series or a Special	A Woman Called Golda	Nominated
1984	Saturn Awards	Best Director	Star Trek III: The Search for Spock	Nominated
1985	Hugo Awards	Best Dramatic Presentation	Star Trek III: The Search for Spock	Nominated
1986	Saturn Awards	Best Director	Star Trek IV: The Voyage Home	Nominated
1986	Saturn Awards	Best Actor	Star Trek IV: The Voyage Home	Nominated
1987	Saturn Awards	The Life Career Award		Awarded
1987	Hugo Awards	Best Dramatic Presentation	Star Trek IV: The Voyage Home	Nominated
1992	Hugo Awards	Best Dramatic Presentation	Star Trek VI: The Undiscovered Country	Nominated
2001	Annie Awards	Voice Acting by a Male Performer in an Animated Feature Production	Atlantis: The Lost Empire	Nominated
2009	Boston Society of Film Critics	Best Cast	Star Trek	Won
2009	Critics' Choice Movie Awards	Best Cast	Star Trek	Nominated
2009	Scream Awards	Best Ensemble	Star Trek	Nominated
2009	Saturn Awards	Best Guest Starring Role on Television	Fringe	Won
2014	National Academy of Television Arts and Sciences Boston/New England Chapter	New England Emmy Awards Governors' Award	Enduring Contributions to the Television Industry	Won

== Bibliography ==
- Poetry
  - You & I (1973) • ISBN 9780912310268
  - Will I Think of You? (1974) • ISBN 9780912310701
  - We Are All Children Searching for Love: A Collection of Poems and Photographs (1977) • ISBN 9780883960240
  - Come be with Me (1978) • ISBN 9780883960332
  - These Words Are for You (1981) • ISBN 9780883961483
  - Warmed by Love (1983) • ISBN 9780883962008
  - A Lifetime of Love: Poems on the Passages of Life (2002) • ISBN 9780883965962
- Autobiography
  - I Am Not Spock (1975) • ISBN 9781568496917
  - I Am Spock (1995) • ISBN 9780786861828
- Screenplays
  - Vincent (1981) (teleplay based on the play "Van Gogh" (1979) by Phillip Stephens) • OCLC 64819808
  - Star Trek IV: The Voyage Home (1986) (story by)
  - Star Trek VI: The Undiscovered Country (1991) (story by)
- Photography
  - Shekhina (2005) • ISBN 9781884167164
  - The Full Body Project (2008) • ISBN 9780979472725
  - Secret Selves (2010) ISBN 9780976427698

== Discography ==
- Leonard Nimoy Presents Mr. Spock's Music from Outer Space (1967)
- Two Sides of Leonard Nimoy (1968)
- The Way I Feel (1968)
- The Touch of Leonard Nimoy (1969)
- The New World of Leonard Nimoy (1970)
- Highly Illogical (1993)
