= Adam Nimoy =

American television director

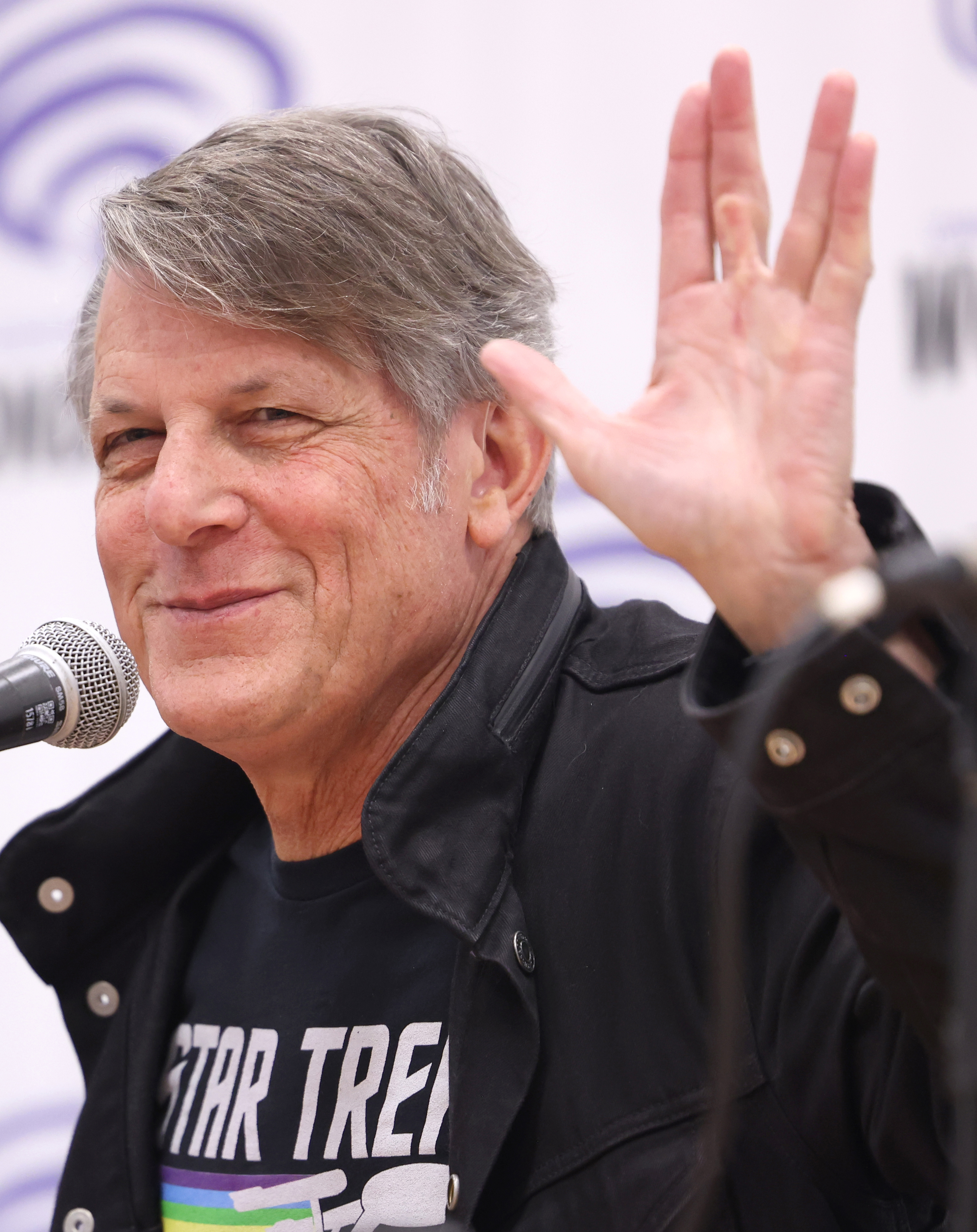
- Nimoy in 2025
- Born: Adam Brett Nimoy; August 9, 1956 (age 70); Los Angeles, California, U.S.
- Education: University of California, Berkeley; Loyola Law School
- Occupation: Television director
- Years active: 1992–present
- Spouses: Nancy Nimoy; Martha Nimoy (died); Terry Farrell (m. 2018, divorced)
- Children: 3, including Jonah
- Parents: Leonard Nimoy (father); Sandra Zober (mother)
- Relatives: Julie Nimoy (sister); Aaron Bay-Schuck (stepbrother)

Adam Brett Nimoy (born August 9, 1956) is an American television director. He is the son of actors Leonard Nimoy and Sandra Zober.

== Early life ==
Nimoy was born Adam Brett Nimoy on August 9, 1956, in Los Angeles, California, to actor Leonard Nimoy and actress Sandra Zober. He has an older sister, Julie. Aaron Bay-Schuck is Nimoy's stepbrother. Nimoy's family is Jewish.

Nimoy obtained his Bachelor of Science at University of California, Berkeley, and his Juris Doctor at Loyola Law School. His years at Loyola also featured summer internships served with Senator Gary Hart and Speaker of the House Tip O'Neill.

== Career ==
Nimoy began his work in the entertainment industry as an attorney in entertainment law, specializing in music and music publishing. According to Information Society lead singer Kurt Harland, he was instrumental in clearing the many Star Trek samples used on the group's self-titled debut record, such as the "Pure energy!" snippet used in the number-three US hit "What's On Your Mind? (Pure Energy)".

Nimoy was a business-affairs executive for EMI America Records and Enigma Records before becoming a TV director. His credits include episodes of NYPD Blue, Nash Bridges, The Practice, Ally McBeal, Gilmore Girls, Star Trek: The Next Generation, Babylon 5, The Outer Limits, in which he directed his father in the episode "I, Robot", and Sliders.

== For the Love of Spock ==
After his father's death in 2015, Nimoy revealed a documentary project the two of them had been working on about the elder Nimoy's famous Star Trek character which the younger Nimoy planned to direct. Nimoy stated that with his father's death, the project would now take on a stronger focus on the life and career of Leonard Nimoy, as well as the character of Spock. In March 2015, Nimoy announced plans to crowd-fund the project's $600,000 budget and provide credit and other perks to the fans who contributed. By that June, the project successfully completed funding through Kickstarter.com, raising $621,721, ahead of its July 1 deadline. The documentary, For the Love of Spock, received the support of interview subjects including William Shatner, George Takei, Walter Koenig, J. J. Abrams, and Seth MacFarlane. The film was released on April 16, 2016, at the Tribeca Film Festival.

Nimoy appeared as himself in "The Spock Resonance", the November 5, 2015, episode of the CBS sitcom The Big Bang Theory, in which he interviews Star Trek fan Sheldon Cooper (Jim Parsons) for the documentary on his father (who had previously lent his voice to the 2012 episode "The Transporter Malfunction", in the series' fifth season).

Nimoy has taught Thesis Film Post Production and Advanced Approaches to Directing at the New York Film Academy.

His memoir, My Incredibly Wonderful, Miserable Life, was published by Pocket Books in 2008.

Special thanks are given to Adam in the liner notes of the album Emergency Third Rail Power Trip (1983, Enigma Records) by the band Rain Parade. "Spock" is also thanked.

== Personal life ==
Nimoy was married to his first wife Nancy for 18 years. They had two children. His second wife, Martha, died of cancer.

In August 2017, Nimoy announced his engagement to actress Terry Farrell, who portrayed Jadzia Dax on Star Trek: Deep Space Nine. They married on March 26, 2018, in a civil ceremony at City Hall in San Francisco on what would have been his father's 87th birthday. According to an August 28, 2024, Los Angeles Times article, Adam Nimoy reports he and Farrell are no longer married.
