= Julie Nimoy =

American film producer and director (born 1955)

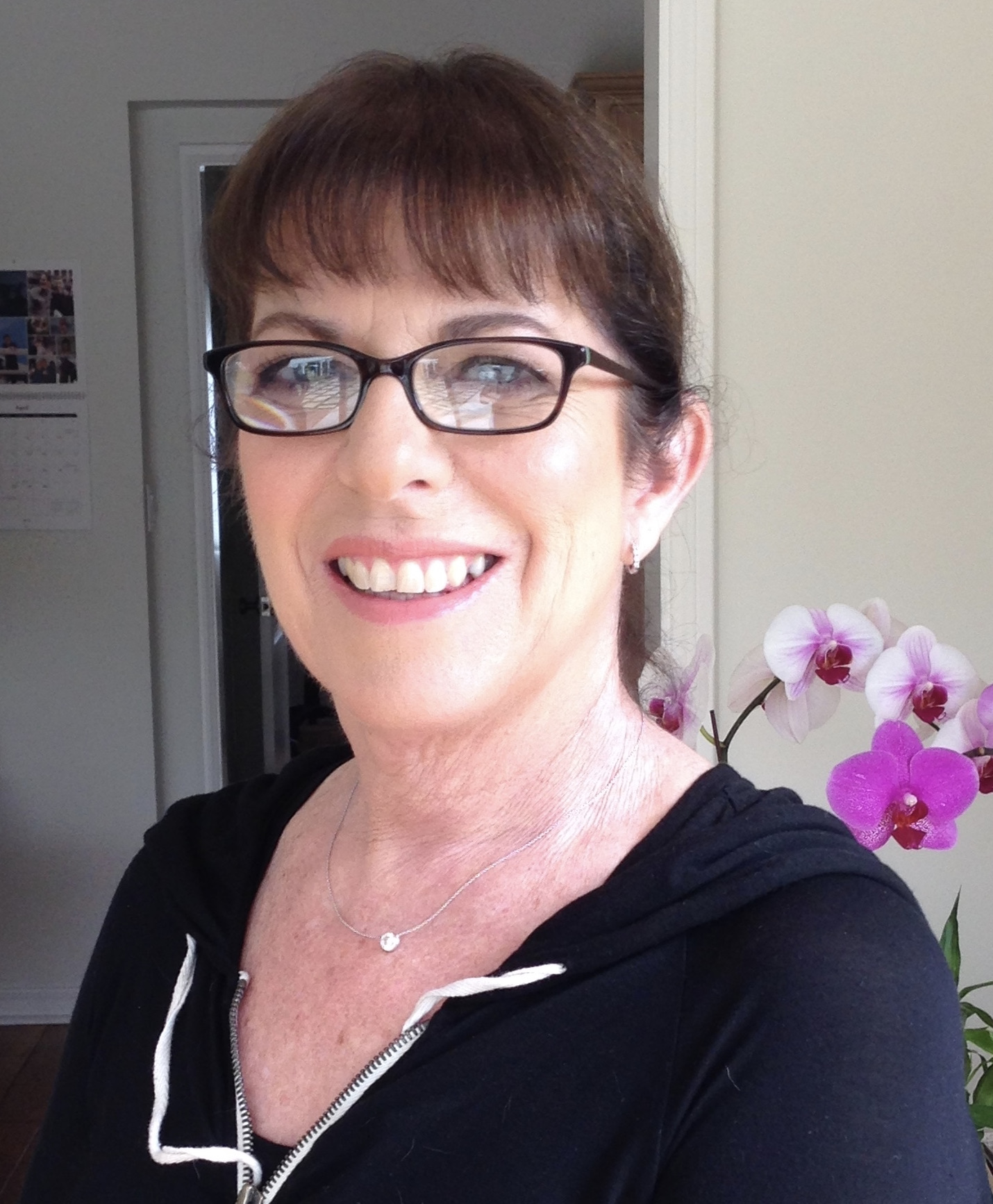
- Born: Julie Ellen Nimoy; March 21, 1955 (age 70); Atlanta, Georgia, U.S.
- Occupations: Film producer; director
- Years active: 1981–present
- Spouses: Alan Mandel (m. 1980; div. 1981); Gregory Schwartz (m. 1984; div. 2011); David Knight (m. 2015)
- Children: 3
- Father: Leonard Nimoy
- Relatives: Adam Nimoy (brother); Aaron Bay-Schuck (stepbrother)

Julie Ellen Nimoy (born March 21, 1955) is an American film producer and director. Nimoy is the daughter of actors Leonard Nimoy and Sandra Zober.

== Early life ==
Julie Nimoy was born in Atlanta while her father was stationed at Fort McPherson and grew up near Century City and in Westwood. She attended University High School. Nimoy shared in her father's interests, including flying and photography. She took flying lessons in order to back him up in his single-engine Piper and learned to work in his home darkroom. She would also travel with her father while he was working and would eventually work behind the scenes on some of his productions, including his one-man show, Vincent and In Search of.... Nimoy attended the University of California, Santa Barbara and graduated with a degree in fine arts.

== Career ==
After college, Nimoy interned briefly as a geriatric art therapist and occupational therapist. She subsequently decided to pursue a career in television and film production, landing production jobs with such companies as Alan Landsburg Productions and Merv Griffin Productions. She also spent time shadowing her father and others, including the second and third assistant directors on Star Trek II: The Wrath of Khan.

Her credits include Deadly Games; Microwarriors: The Origin and the Destiny, about probiotics and directed by her brother, Adam Nimoy and narrated by Leonard Nimoy; and Unexplained Bleeding: Shedding Light on Acquired Hemophilia A. Nimoy also appeared in one of series of Oldsmobile commercials with her father, who directed the commercial.

In her 50s, Nimoy graduated from Le Cordon Bleu culinary school, in Pasadena, California. She then ran a catering service and worked as a baker in a restaurant.

== Remembering Leonard Nimoy ==
In 2014, Leonard Nimoy became an advocate and activist for COPD awareness and prevention by posting on social media about the dangers of smoking. Julie Nimoy, wanting to support his efforts, collaborated with her husband, filmmaker David Knight, and began production on a documentary tentatively titled, COPD: Highly Illogical- A Special Tribute to Leonard Nimoy. After Leonard Nimoy's death in 2015, the focus of the film was expanded to also serve as a remembrance of his life and retitled, Remembering Leonard Nimoy.

== Remembering Gene Wilder ==
Remembering Gene Wilder is a 2023 American biographical documentary film about Gene Wilder's life and career, as well as his battle with Alzheimer's disease. It was directed by Ron Frank and executive produced by Nimoy and David Knight. The film premiered in May 2023 at the Los Angeles Jewish Film Festival.

== The Nimoy Knight Foundation ==
Nimoy and Knight have formed The Nimoy Knight Foundation to continue Leonard Nimoy's wish to create awareness for lung disease and prevention. They collaborated with the Centers for Disease Control and Prevention on their annual smoking cessation campaign called, "Tips from Former Smokers" by featuring Leonard Nimoy's story. The campaign also includes print ads, national TV commercials and social media. Since 2021, Nimoy and Knight have partnered with L.A. Care Health Plan on a billboard and social media campaign encouraging the public to get vaccinated and boosted.

=== The Live Long and Prosper Tribute Award ===
The foundation honors individuals and organizations that embody the spirit of Leonard Nimoy's message of hope, logic, and service to others with the LLAP Tribute Award. The award recognizes those who make extraordinary contributions to their communities, embodying the values that Leonard Nimoy championed throughout his life. Recipients are chosen for their commitment to making the world a better place, whether through scientific advancement, community service, autism advocacy, or promoting diversity and inclusion.

The award was established in 2023. As of February 2026 the most recent recipient is Dr. Jessica Schonhut-Stasik, an astrophysicist and neurodiversity advocate, whose research focuses on galactic archaeology. She is also the CEO of The Neuroverse Initiative, a nonprofit organization that supports neurodiversity in space science.

Other notable recipients of the award include George Takei, LeVar Burton, Whoopi Goldberg, Billie Jean King, Bill Nye, Rod Roddenberry, and Neil deGrasse Tyson.
