= Leonard Nimoy discography =

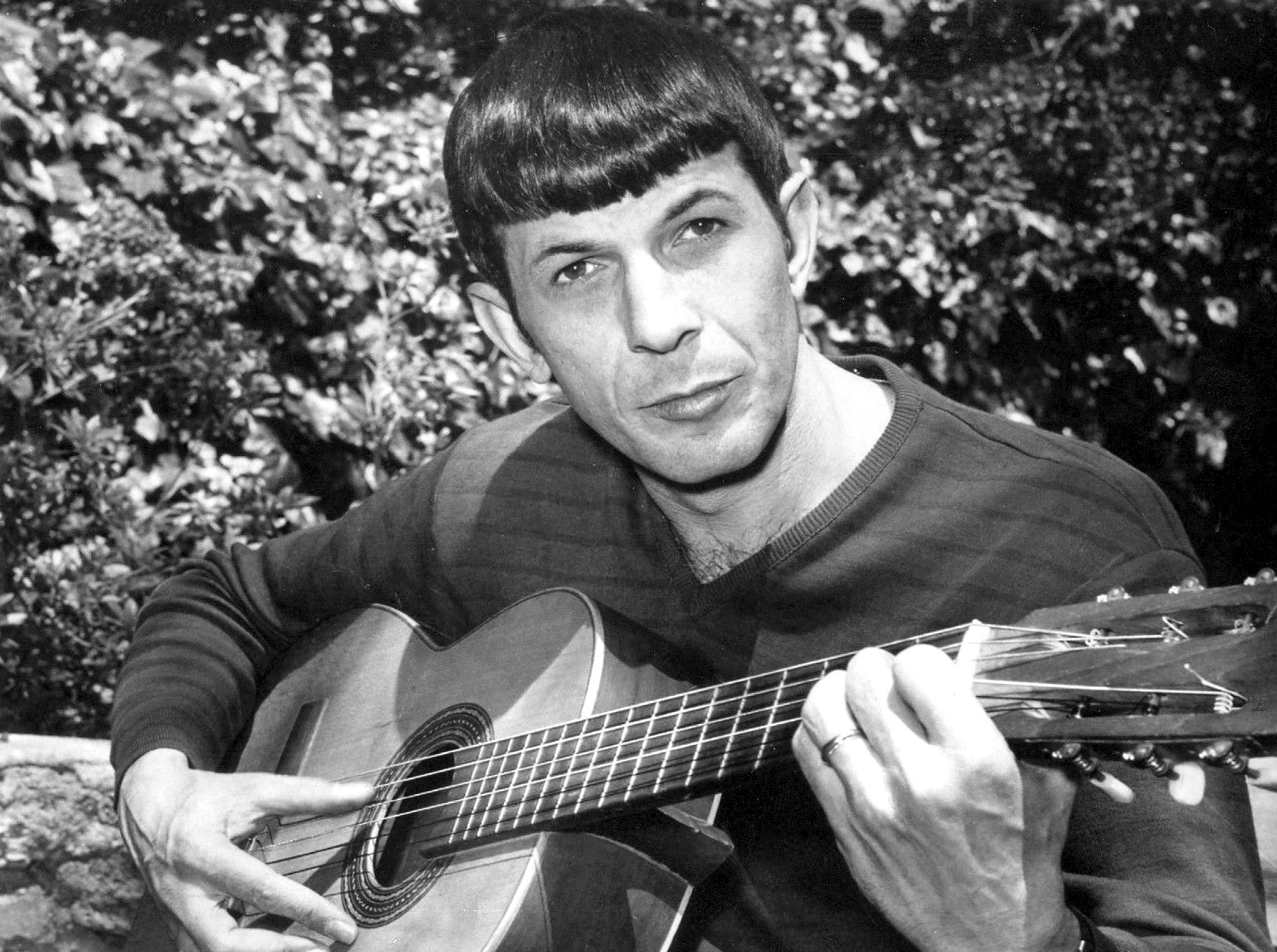
Leonard Nimoy playing guitar in 1967

During and following Star Trek, Leonard Nimoy released five albums of musical vocal recordings on Dot Records. On his first album, Mr. Spock's Music from Outer Space, and half of his second album Two Sides of Leonard Nimoy, science fiction-themed songs are featured where Nimoy sings as Spock. On his final three albums, he sings popular folk songs of the era and cover versions of popular songs, such as "Proud Mary" and Johnny Cash's "I Walk the Line". There are also several songs on the later albums that were written or co-written by Nimoy. Describing how his recording career got started, Nimoy stated;

Charles Grean of Dot Records had arranged with the studio to do an album of space music based on music from Star Trek, and he has a teenage daughter who's a fan of the show and a fan of Mr. Spock. She said, 'Well, if you're going to do an album of music from Star Trek, then Mr. Spock should be on the album.' So Dot contacted me and asked me if I would be interested in either speaking or singing on the record. I said I was very interested in doing both. ... That was the first album we did, which was called Mr. Spock's Music from Outer Space. It was very well received and successful enough that Dot then approached me and asked me to sign a long-term contract.

== Studio albums ==
1. Leonard Nimoy Presents Mr. Spock's Music from Outer Space (Dot Records), (1967)
2. Two Sides of Leonard Nimoy (Dot Records), (1968)
3. The Way I Feel (Dot Records, Stereo DLP 25883), (1968)
4. The Touch of Leonard Nimoy (Dot Records, Stereo DLP 25910), (1969)
5. The New World of Leonard Nimoy (Dot Records, Stereo DLP 25966), (1970)

== Spoken word albums ==
1. The Martian Chronicles (Caedmon Records, 1976)
2. Illustrated Man (Caedmon Records, 1977)
3. War of the Worlds (Caedmon Records, 1977)
4. Green Hills of Earth (Caedmon Records, 1977)
5. The Mysterious Golem (JRT Records, 1982)

== Singles (45s) ==
- "The Ballad of Bilbo Baggins" / "Cotton Candy" (Dot Records, 1967)
- "Theme from Star Trek" / "Visit to a Sad Planet" (Dot Records, 1967)
- "I'd Love Making Love to You" / "Please Don't Try to Change My Mind" (Dot Records, 1968)
- "Consilium" / "Here We Go 'Round Again" (Dot Records, 1968)
- "The Sun Will Rise" / "Time to Get It Together" (Dot Records, 1969)
- "Outer Space" / "Inner Mind" (Paramount Records, 1970)

== Cassettes ==
- Leonard Nimoy / Micro-Cassette (Dot Records, release date unknown)
- You Are Not Alone (MCA Records, 1987)

== Compilations ==
1. Highly Illogical (Rev-Ola Records, UK, 1993)
2. Leonard Nimoy Presents: Mr. Spock's Music from Outer Space (Varése Sarabande, US, 1995)
3. Spaced Out: The Very Best of Leonard Nimoy & William Shatner (Universal Music/Space, Canada, 1997)

== Samples in songs ==
- "Theme from Gutbuster" (2000) – song by Bentley Rhythm Ace on their album For Your Ears Only samples Nimoy's "The Ballad of Bilbo Baggins"
- "What's on Your Mind (Pure Energy)" (1988) – song by American synthpop band Information Society that uses a sample of Nimoy's voice from the Star Trek episode "Errand of Mercy".
