= The Jack Paar Program =

- Genre: Talk show; Variety show
- Directed by: Hal Gurnee
- Presented by: Jack Paar
- Announcer: Jim Lucas
- Music by: José Melis
- Country of origin: United States
- Original language: English

Production
- Producers: Jack Paar; Paul Orr; Paul W. Keyes
- Production locations: Studio 6B, RCA Building, New York City
- Running time: 60 minutes

Original release
- Network: NBC
- Release: September 21, 1962 – September 10, 1965

Related
- Tonight Starring Jack Paar; The Tonight Show Starring Johnny Carson; Jack Paar Tonite

The Jack Paar Program is an American television talk and variety show hosted by Jack Paar that aired weekly in prime time on NBC from 1962 to 1965. The hour-long program followed Paar's departure from Tonight Starring Jack Paar and retained much of the conversational format and many of the recurring guests associated with his late-night series.

== Background ==
Paar left Tonight in March 1962 after nearly five years as its host. Producing a 105-minute program five nights each week had become difficult for him to sustain, and he preferred the prospect of appearing once a week in prime time. NBC, seeking to prevent him from moving to another network, offered Paar an hour-long Friday-night program giving him substantial control of its content and format.

The Jack Paar Program began its network run on September 21, 1962. It aired on Friday evenings and continued for three seasons. Paar's former late-night program was meanwhile succeeded by The Tonight Show Starring Johnny Carson, which premiered on October 1, 1962.

== Format and production ==
The program combined an opening monologue, conversations with guests, comedy and musical performances, and filmed features. Paar continued to favour informal interviews with entertainers, writers and political figures rather than using a conventional variety-show format exclusively. Hal Gurnee, who had worked with Paar on Tonight, directed the weekly series.

The show also had an international emphasis. Paar presented performers from outside the United States and screened films made during his travels in Africa, Europe, Latin America and the Soviet Union. His daughter Randy sometimes appeared with him to help narrate the travel footage.

A number of personalities associated with Paar's earlier program returned, including writer Alexander King, pianist Oscar Levant and comedian Jonathan Winters. Other guests included political figures such as Richard Nixon, Barry Goldwater and Ted Kennedy, and performers including Judy Garland, Ethel Merman, Peggy Lee, Liza Minnelli, Woody Allen, Bill Cosby, Godfrey Cambridge, Dick Gregory, Mike Nichols and Elaine May, and Jackie Vernon.

The program was produced at NBC's Studio 6B in the RCA Building in New York City, the studio from which Paar had hosted most of Tonight Starring Jack Paar. Paar, Paul Orr and Paul W. Keyes were the show's producers, Tom Cochran was associate producer, Hal Gurnee director, and José Melis was musical director. Jim Lucas served as the program's announcer, taking over from Hugh Downs, who had held the position during Paar's run on Tonight but had moved dayside as host of Today.

== Notable broadcasts ==
The program gave Joan Rivers one of her earliest television appearances. An appearance by Mickey Rooney became notable when Rooney walked off the program during the broadcast.

On March 8, 1963, former vice-president Richard Nixon appeared and performed a piano composition of his own, accompanied by a string section arranged for the program. Gurnee later described Nixon as one of the series' most unexpectedly effective guests.

On January 3, 1964, the program showed filmed concert footage of the Beatles more than a month before their first live appearance on The Ed Sullivan Show. The segment was among the earliest prime-time American television presentations of the group. Paar had obtained the footage after hearing about the band in Britain, although he initially presented the phenomenon humorously rather than predicting its cultural impact. Director Hal Gurnee later recalled the decision to show the footage and its broadcast shortly before the Beatles appeared on Sullivan's program.

Another notable appearance featured boxer Cassius Clay, later known as Muhammad Ali, performing songs and reciting verse with Paar and pianist Liberace.

== End of the series ==
Paar, having purchased a station of his own (WMTW) and desiring a greater role in its operations than NBC would have allowed, chose to end the program after three seasons and largely withdrew from national television work. The final original episode was broadcast on June 25, 1965. It included retrospective appearances by or footage of guests such as Richard Burton, Bette Davis, Liberace, Jonathan Winters and Billy Graham. Paar concluded the program alone onstage, recounting a conversation with his daughter about his departure before leaving with his dog.

Paar subsequently produced and appeared in occasional NBC specials but did not host another regular series until the short-lived ABC program Jack Paar Tonite in 1973.
