= Tonight Starring Jack Paar =

American talk show (1957–1962)

- Intertitle, with "Tonight" serving as a variant of the original Today logo
- Also known as: The Jack Paar Tonight Show; The Jack Paar Show
- Directed by: Kirk Alexander (1957—1961), Hal Gurnee (1961—1962)
- Starring: Jack Paar
- Announcer: Franklin Pangborn (1957); Hugh Downs (1957—1962); Jim Lucas (fill-in)
- Music by: José Melis and the Tonight band
- Opening theme: "Everything's Coming Up Roses"
- Country of origin: United States

Production
- Production locations: Studio 6B, RCA Building
- Running time: 105 minutes (with commercials)

Original release
- Network: NBC
- Release: July 29, 1957 – March 30, 1962

Related
- Tonight Starring Steve Allen Tonight Starring Ernie Kovacs; The Jack Paar Program; The Tonight Show Starring Johnny Carson Jack Paar Tonite

Tonight Starring Jack Paar (in later seasons The Jack Paar Tonight Show) is an American television talk show broadcast by NBC. The show is the second installment of The Tonight Show. Hosted by Jack Paar, it aired from July 29, 1957, to March 30, 1962, replacing Tonight Starring Steve Allen and was replaced by The Tonight Show Starring Johnny Carson.

During most of its run it was broadcast from Studio 6B (formerly the home of Milton Berle's Texaco Star Theater series) inside 30 Rockefeller Plaza in New York City. The same studio later hosted early episodes of The Tonight Show Starring Johnny Carson, Late Night with Jimmy Fallon and The Tonight Show Starring Jimmy Fallon. Its theme song was an instrumental version of "Everything's Coming Up Roses", and the closing theme was "So Until I See You" by Al Lerner.

== History ==
In July 1957, after the failure of Tonight! America After Dark (a news-oriented program first hosted by Jack Lescoulie and briefly by Al Collins), NBC reverted its late-night show, Tonight, to a talk/variety show format as it had been during Steve Allen's tenure as host. Jack Paar was brought in to host the reformatted Tonight. He was, at the time, working for CBS and hosting the network's The Morning Show, a morning show similar to NBC's The Today Show, before he agreed to jump networks and take over Tonight.

Under Paar, most of the NBC affiliates that had dropped the show during the ill-fated run of America After Dark, or who had never picked it up, began airing the show once again. Paar's era began the practice of branding the series after the host, and as such the program, though officially still called Tonight, was marketed as The Jack Paar Show. A combo band conducted by Paar's Army buddy pianist José Melis filled commercial breaks and backed musical entertainers. When Paar was on vacation, guest hosts presided over the show; one of these early hosts was Johnny Carson. Other guest hosts included Jonathan Winters, Orson Bean, Dick Van Dyke as well as the show's announcer, Hugh Downs.

Starting on September 19, 1960, it was one of the first regularly scheduled shows to be videotaped in color, with the show recorded very early in the evening and broadcast from 11:15 P.M. to 1 A.M. Eastern time that night. Only a handful of complete Jack Paar "Tonight Show" episodes exist. All of them are black-and-white kinescope recordings. No color videotapes of any complete Paar "Tonight" shows are known to exist. Paar hosted the program from 1957 to 1962.

Paar's original announcer was actor Franklin Pangborn, but he was fired after only a few nights. His replacement was Hugh Downs, who stayed with Paar to the end.

At first, the show was called "Tonight Starring Jack Paar"; after 1959 it was officially known as The Jack Paar Show (or The Jack Paar Tonight Show, a phrasing which led to the name "The Tonight Show," as opposed to simply "Tonight," being adopted permanently after Paar's departure). Only a few minutes of video of Paar's talk host career in color are known to exist; NBC's policy at the time was to preserve programming on black-and-white kinescopes, but this policy only applied to live or videotaped prime time programming, and as such, the videotapes of most of Paar's Tonight Show appearances were taped over and no longer exist, a policy that continued through the first ten years of Johnny Carson's hosting of the same series.

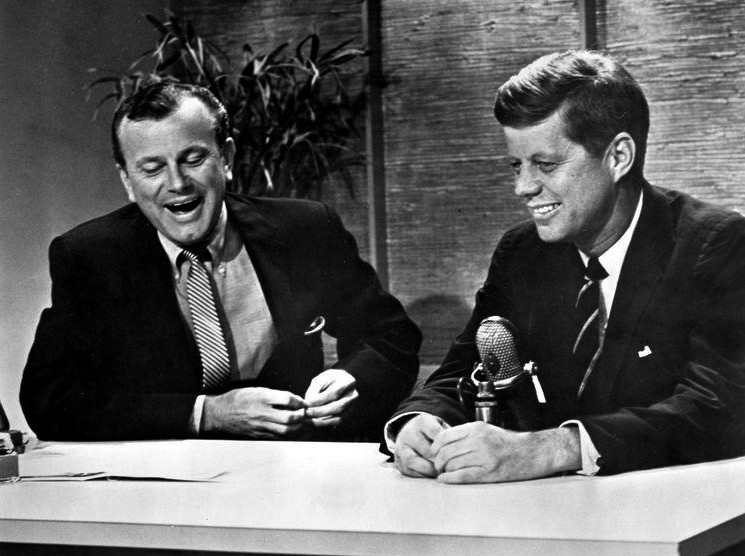
Senator John F. Kennedy, then a candidate for president, as a Tonight Show guest, 1959.

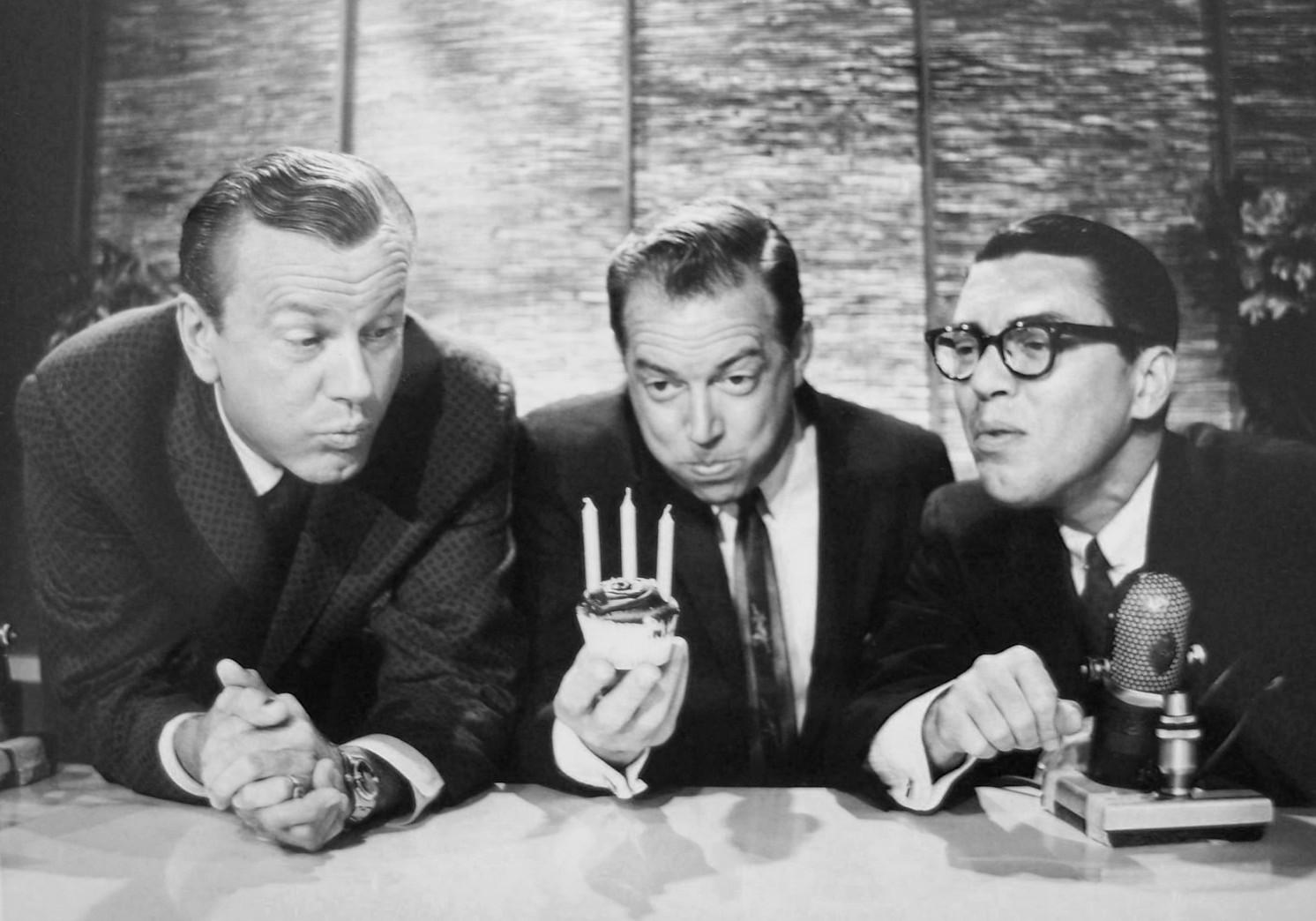
The cast in 1960 (L-R): host Jack Paar, announcer Hugh Downs and bandleader José Melis

During Paar's stint as host, The Tonight Show became an entertainment juggernaut; Paar generated the most obsessive fascination and curiosity from press and public of anyone who ever hosted the show. He strove for compelling conversation as well as humor. His guests tended to be literate raconteurs such as Peter Ustinov or intellectuals such as William F. Buckley Jr., as opposed to just actors or other performers selling their current work, while Paar earned a reputation as a superb storyteller.

He surrounded himself with a memorable group of regulars and semi-regulars, including Cliff Arquette as the homespun "Charley Weaver", author-illustrator Alexander King, Tedi Thurman (NBC's sultry "Miss Monitor") and comedy actresses Peggy Cass and Dody Goodman. Goodman was a regular from shortly after the show's debut until Paar fired her in 1958. Goodman frequently stepped on Paar's lines and was seen as an uncontrollable upstager.

Paar's oft repeated expression, I kid you not (something Humphrey Bogart as Capt. Philip Queeg uttered often in The Caine Mutiny), became a national catchphrase. In 1959, Paar's gag writer Jack Douglas became a bestselling author (My Brother Was an Only Child, A Funny Thing Happened to Me on the Way to the Grave: An Autobiography) after his regular appearances with Paar. Douglas' Japanese wife Reiko often appeared, as did Hungarian beauty queen Zsa Zsa Gabor, French comedian Genevieve and several British performers appeared as well. Paar enjoyed conversing with foreigners and knew their accents would spice up the proceedings.

Hal Gurnee directed Tonight for much of Paar's tenure as well as the period between Paar's departure and Carson's arrival, when the show was presented by a series of guest hosts. Gurnee went on to direct Paar's prime time The Jack Paar Program and later directed The David Letterman Show, Late Night with David Letterman, and the Late Show with David Letterman.

=== Controversy ===
In 1959, Paar was criticized for his interview with Cuban leader Fidel Castro; Paar's on-location interview was the last time any American late-night show filmed in Cuba until Conan O'Brien, who himself briefly hosted Tonight, visited the country in 2015 for an episode of his show, Conan.

On December 1, 1959, Paar again made news by asking an apparently inebriated Mickey Rooney to leave the program, remarking "It's a shame, he was such a great talent." Rooney and Paar quickly reconciled.

In 1961, Paar broadcast his show from Berlin, just as the Berlin Wall was going up. He attacked members of the United States Senate and the American press who criticized him, including syndicated columnist Dorothy Kilgallen of the New York Journal-American, Earl Wilson of the New York Post, Jack Gould of The New York Times, Irv Kupcinet of the Chicago Sun-Times and Senator Mike Mansfield. Paar also engaged in a number of public feuds, one of them with CBS luminary Ed Sullivan, and another with Walter Winchell. The latter feud "effectively ended Winchell's career", beginning a shift in power from print to television. Paar famously introduced actress Jayne Mansfield with the line "here they are, Jayne Mansfield!" (a reference to Mansfield's breasts); the writer of the joke was Dick Cavett, who later went on to host his own show on ABC.

Paar was openly anti-LGBT; he devoted a whole chapter of his 1962 autobiography to his thoughts on the LGBT community and what he perceived to be its negative impact on Broadway theater and fashion, and he refused to book openly gay or transsexual people as guests on Tonight (specifically mentioning Christine Jorgensen as an example).

=== On-air resignation and return ===
Paar was often unpredictable and emotional. The most notorious example of this kind of on-screen behavior was demonstrated on the February 10, 1960, show, when one of his jokes was cut from a broadcast by studio censors. The joke in question involved a woman writing to a vacation resort and inquiring about the availability of a "W.C." The woman used that term to mean "water closet" (i.e., bathroom), but the gentleman who received the letter misunderstood "W.C." to mean "wayside chapel" (i.e., church). The full text of the joke is:

An English lady is visiting Switzerland. She asks about the location of the "W.C." The Swiss, thinking she is referring to the "Wayside Chapel", leaves her a note that said (in part) "the W.C. is situated nine miles from the room that you will occupy... It is capable of holding about 229 people and it is only open on Sunday and Thursday... It may interest you to know that my daughter was married in the W.C. and it was there that she met her husband... I shall be delighted to reserve the best seat for you, if you wish, where you will be seen by everyone."

NBC censors replaced that section of the show with news coverage and failed to inform Paar of their decision. On February 11, 1960, Jack Paar quit the show. As he left his desk in the middle of the program, he said:

I am leaving The Tonight Show. There must be a better way of making a living than this. There's a way of entertaining people without being constantly involved in some form of controversy which is on me all the time. It's rough on my wife and child, and I don't need it. I like the National Broadcasting Company, they've been swell to me. And I've been pretty wonderful to them. I took over a show with 60 stations. There is now 158. This show is sold out. It's the highest, I think, money producer for this network. And I believe I was let down by this network at a time when I could have used their help. You have been peachy to me always.

Although Paar had earlier told his announcer Hugh Downs of his intention to quit the show, Downs at first thought Paar was joking. He expected the host to return to the stage, but the abrupt departure left Downs to finish the broadcast himself. While Paar traveled outside the country, his disappearance became a national news event. The entire broadcast of this episode exists on audio tape from WMCT in Memphis, with video footage of the incident appearing on YouTube in 2024 - taken from a 16 mm kinescope.

Urged to return to the show by his friend Jonathan Winters, Paar reappeared on March 7, 1960, strolled on stage, struck a pose, and said, "As I was saying before I was interrupted...". After the audience erupted in applause, Paar continued, "I believe my last words were that there must be a better way of making a living than this. Well, I've looked... and there isn't." That line produced a burst of laughter from the audience. He then went on to explain his departure with typical frankness: "Leaving the show was a childish and perhaps emotional thing. I have been guilty of such action in the past and will perhaps be again. I'm totally unable to hide what I feel. It is not an asset in show business, but I shall do the best I can to amuse and entertain you and let other people speak freely, as I have in the past."

== Paar's departure ==
Jack Paar left the show on March 30, 1962, citing the fact that he could no longer handle the load of putting on an hour and forty-five minute show a night, five nights a week. Over the course of its run, Paar was given more time off so that most Mondays featured a guest host, and all Friday shows were "Best Of Paar" repeats, giving Paar only three nights of material to fill. To fulfill the rest of his NBC contract after leaving Tonight, Paar hosted a prime-time variety series, The Jack Paar Program and aired weekly, on Friday nights, through 1965.

As for Tonight, Johnny Carson was chosen as Paar's successor. At the time, Carson was host of the weekday afternoon quiz show Who Do You Trust? on ABC. Because Carson was under contract to Trust through September, he could not take over as host until October 1, 1962. They held him to his contract until the day it expired, prompting him to make occasional wisecracks on Who Do You Trust? about the situation- "I'd like to welcome you to ABC...the network with a heart". The months between Paar and Carson were taken by a series of guest hosts, including Groucho Marx, Jerry Lewis, Jack Carter and Mort Sahl. The show was broadcast under the title The Tonight Show during this interregnum.

Much like Paar, Carson too became weary of the show's length and struggled to fill so much airtime. As late local newscasts expanded, Tonight was shortened to 90 minutes, and then to the current 60 minutes after Carson renegotiated his contract in 1980. Carson also arranged for the use of guest hosts and reruns during the week so that he only had to appear three times per week and sometimes during sweeps, four times a week, a practice that has since been abandoned in the Leno, O'Brien and Fallon hosting runs, due to increased competition. By 1982, Carson had 180 minutes of airtime to fill a week, compared to the 525 minutes Paar was filling at the beginning of his run, reducing the work load by nearly two thirds.

In 1973, Paar attempted a return to late-night television with Jack Paar Tonite on ABC. The show lasted one season.

== See also ==
- Late-night talk show
