= I Dreamed =

Song
- Published: 1956
- Composer(s): Charles Grean
- Lyricist(s): Marvin Moore

"I Dreamed" is a popular song with music by Charles Grean and lyrics by Marvin Moore. It was published in 1956.

The biggest hit version was done by Betty Johnson in 1956. This recording was released by Bally Records as catalog number 1020. It first reached the Billboard magazine charts on December 15, 1956. On the Disk Jockey chart, it peaked at #9; on the Best Seller chart, at #22; on the Juke Box chart, at #15; on the composite chart of the top 100 songs, it reached #12. Altogether it spent 18 weeks on the charts.

In the UK, a version by The Beverley Sisters reached No. 24 in the charts in 1957.

The song became a focus of litigation in 1958 in the case Dorchester Music v. National Broadcasting Company [171 F. Supp. 580 (S.D. Cal. 1959)]. Fred Spielman, who had composed the song "Rendezvous" in 1953, charged that Grean had plagiarized from his song in writing "I Dreamed." (No charge was made with reference to the lyrics.) The court found in favor of the plaintiff on November 18, 1958.
