= Betty Johnson =

American pop and cabaret singer (1929–2022)

Betty Johnson (March 16, 1929 – November 6, 2022) was an American traditional pop and cabaret singer who reached her career peak in the 1950s.

== Biography ==
Johnson was born in Guilford County, North Carolina on March 16, 1929.

Johnson's professional debut was in a family group, the Johnson Family Singers, including her parents and three brothers, singing a repertoire primarily of religious material. The family won a singing contest in Charlotte, North Carolina, and was signed to a contract on a WBT (AM), a major radio station in that city. The family sang on broadcasts from 1938 to 1951, and Betty did some solo work on the station as well beginning in 1943. By 1948, she had her own 15-minute radio program.

As a teenager, she was signed by Columbia Records and made some recordings, none of which were successful.

From 1949 to 1954 she was married to Dick Redding, having one son from that marriage, Harold Richard Redding (born 1952), known as "Dickie."

In 1951, Percy Faith, who had known her from her Columbia recordings, tried to convince Mitch Miller (A&R director at Columbia) to sign her, but Miller, who included Doris Day and Rosemary Clooney among the artists he had signed, was not interested.

Johnson released a children's album with country singer Eddy Arnold produced by Simon & Schuster, who subsequently signed her to their own recording label, Bell Records in 1954. In the same year she signed with Csida-Grean, a management company which had handled Arnold's career. Charles Grean of that company produced many of her subsequent recordings. In 1955, she signed with RCA Victor, which sent her to Chicago, Illinois. She married Grean in 1957, and though the marriage would only last until 1961, the professional relationship continued.

In Chicago, Johnson worked with Arnold again on his syndicated television series, Eddy Arnold Time, backed by a group who had worked with her family on the Grand Ole Opry, The Jordanaires. That group later became well known as a backing group for Elvis Presley. While in Chicago, she also did some work on Don McNeill's Breakfast Club beginning in 1955, which led to a contract with a small record company, Bally Records. After one not-so-notable recording for Bally, she clicked with her biggest hit, "I Dreamed", in 1956. She continued to appear on The Breakfast Club until 1957.

She then was hired by Jack Paar for his television show, Tonight. This led to a record contract with Atlantic Records in 1957, for which she had her next big hit, "Little Blue Man", a novelty number which featured Fred Ebb as the voice of the "Little Blue Man", repeatedly saying: "I wuv you, I wuv you... to bits". Johnson continued on Tonight until 1962 when Paar was replaced by Johnny Carson. During this time she also made appearances on a number of other television shows.

In 1964 she married Arthur Gray, an investment banker in New York City. She had two daughters, Elisabeth (born 1968) and Lydia (born 1966), from this marriage. From then until 1993 she mostly stayed out of show business, going to college (attending some classes at Dartmouth College beginning in 1977, but ultimately getting her Bachelor of Arts degree from the University of New Hampshire in 1981).

In 1984 and 1985, Johnson appeared as Essie Miller in the Goodspeed Opera Houses revival of TAKE ME ALONG! In 1993, she returned to show business, appearing at the Algonquin Hotel in New York and subsequently starting her own record label, Bliss Tavern Music, for which she continued to make recordings. Her recent projects include Four Shades of Gray; a collaboration with her daughters Lydia Gray, Elisabeth Gray and granddaughter Betty Gray and the restoration and remastering from LPs of The Take Five Sessions Betty recorded in NYC with the Lou Garisto Quartet on the late 1950s through early 1960s.

Johnson died at her home in South Carolina on November 6, 2022, at the age of 93.

== Biggest hit singles ==
- "I Want Eddie Fisher for Christmas" (1954)
- "I Dreamed" (1956)
- "1492" (1957)
- "Little White Lies" (1957)
- "The Song You Heard When You Fell in Love" (1957) (Top 40, Canada)
- "Little Blue Man" (1958)
- "Dream" (1958)
- "You Can't Get to Heaven" (1959)
- "Slipping Around" (1960)
