= Variety Time =

1948 US film directed by Hal Yates

- Directed by: Hal Yates
- Screenplay by: Hal Law; Hal Yates; Leo Solomon; Joseph Quillan
- Produced by: George Bilson
- Starring: Jack Paar
- Cinematography: Robert de Grasse; Vincent J. Farrar; George Diskant
- Edited by: Les Millbrook; Edward W. Williams
- Music by: Constantin Bakaleinikoff
- Production company: RKO Radio Pictures
- Release date: August 21, 1948 (US)
- Running time: 59 minutes
- Country: United States
- Language: English

Variety Time is a 1948 American variety film directed by Hal Yates. The film is a compilation of musical numbers from various RKO features and comedy footage from RKO short subjects. Future Tonight Show host Jack Paar appears as master of ceremonies, offering comic monologues, introducing the assorted clips, and playing straight man for Hans Conried in a dialect-comedy sketch.

The previously filmed sequences include comedy stars Leon Errol and Edgar Kennedy, a Flicker Flashbacks silent-movie revival, and musical numbers with dance act Jesse and James (in an out-take from the 1944 musical Show Business); Lynn, Royce and Vanya in a specialty from Seven Days Leave, Frankie Carle and his orchestra in a clip from Riverboat Rhythm, and Miguelito Valdes in a scene from Pan-Americana.

The film was inexpensively produced (only $51,000 for the entire feature) and showed a profit of $132,000, prompting RKO to compile three more "clip shows," Make Mine Laughs (1949), Footlight Varieties (1951), and Merry Mirthquakes (1953).
