= Hal Gurnee =

American television director (born 1925)

Harold Gurnee (born January 25, 1925) is an American television director and producer. His career in television began at the DuMont Television Network in the late 1940s and later included Tonight Starring Jack Paar, The Jack Paar Program, The David Letterman Show, Late Night with David Letterman, and Late Show with David Letterman. He won two Primetime Emmy Awards, including the 1991 award for directing Late Night with David Letterman.

== Life and career ==
Gurnee was born in New York City on January 25, 1925. After college, he moved to New York in 1948 intending to work in advertising. He instead entered television at the DuMont Television Network, where he worked in the control room on programs including Cavalcade of Stars and served as an associate director on broadcasts of New York Yankees and New York Giants baseball games.

After DuMont ceased operations, Gurnee joined NBC as an assistant director. He worked on Tonight Starring Jack Paar and was promoted to director during Jack Paar's tenure, becoming the program's full-time director through Paar's departure in 1962. He continued directing Tonight during the period of guest hosts before Johnny Carson took over, and subsequently directed Paar's The Jack Paar Program and the ABC series Jack Paar Tonite.

Gurnee later attempted to retire from television, but returned after producer Jack Rollins recruited him to direct NBC's daytime The David Letterman Show in 1980. When David Letterman returned to NBC with Late Night with David Letterman in 1982, Gurnee became its director and remained with the program for its entire NBC run. He occasionally became part of the program's comedy, with Letterman speaking to him in the control room and deliberately mispronouncing his surname.

Gurnee moved with Letterman to CBS in 1993 to direct Late Show with David Letterman, where he also served as supervising producer. He semi-retired in 1995, although he continued to take occasional television assignments and returned to directing with The Man Show in 1999.

Gurnee received nine Directors Guild of America Award nominations for his work on Letterman's programs. He received 11 Primetime Emmy Award nominations and won twice: for directing Late Night with David Letterman in 1991 and as a producer of Late Show with David Letterman when it won Outstanding Variety, Music or Comedy Series in 1994.

Gurnee turned 101 on January 25, 2026.
