= The Way I Feel =

The Way I Feel may refer to:

== Albums ==
- The Way I Feel (Gordon Lightfoot album), or the title song
- The Way I Feel (John Patton album), or the title song
- The Way I Feel (Leonard Nimoy album)
- The Way I Feel (Remy Shand album), or the title song
- The Way I Feel (Sonny Rollins album)
- The Way I Feel (Phil Upchurch album)
- The Way I Feel (Bill Anderson album)
- The Way I Feel, by Boyd Rice
- The Way I Feel, by Irma Thomas

== Songs ==
- "The Way I Feel", by 12 Stones from 12 Stones
- "The Way I Feel", by Jan Hellriegel
- "The Way I Feel", by Paul Oakenfold from A Lively Mind
- "The Way I Feel", by Rancid from ...And Out Come the Wolves
- "The Way I Feel", by The Wanted from The Wanted
- "The Way I Feel", by Keane from Cause and Effect
- "The Way I Feel", by Dude York from Sincerely
- "The Way I Feel", by Gary Wright, a B-side of single "Back To The Magic"
- "The Way I Feel", by Air Supply
- "The Way I Feel", by Adrian Gurvitz

== See also ==
- The Way I Feel Today (Six by Seven album)
- The Way I Feel Today (Stan Ridgway album)
