= Little White Lies (1930 song) =

Song by Fred Waring's Pennsylvanians
- Published: 1930
- Recorded: July 25, 1930
- Genre: Jazz
- Label: Victor
- Songwriter(s): Walter Donaldson

"Little White Lies" is a popular song, written by Walter Donaldson and published in 1930. It was recorded on July 25, 1930 by Fred Waring's Pennsylvanians (on the Victor label) with vocal by Clare Hanlon and The Waring Girls. Several other artists also recorded the song in 1930 including bandleaders Ted Wallace (Columbia) and Earl Burtnett (Brunswick) as well as vocalists Johnny Marvin (Victor), Marion Harris (Brunswick) and Lee Morse (Columbia).

== History ==
The organist Jesse Crawford also recorded it for Victor in 1930. The song was also recorded on small budget labels by Vincent Lopez, Harry Reser and Annette Hanshaw. In Britain, it was covered by Bob and Alf Pearson.

Ella Fitzgerald recorded this in the spring of 1939 with Chick Webb's band, it was released on Decca. Moon Mullican also recorded the song in 1939 as featured vocalist with the Cliff Bruner Western swing group.

A hit version was recorded by Dick Haymes on November 3, 1947. The recording was released by Decca Records as catalog number 24280. The record first reached the Billboard chart on April 2, 1948 and lasted 23 weeks on the chart, peaking at #3. The disc sold over a million copies within the year.

The song was also recorded by Dinah Shore on December 12, 1947 and released by Columbia Records as catalog number 38114. The record first reached the Billboard chart on June 25, 1948 and lasted one week on the chart, at #28.

The song had another revival in 1957, when a version by Betty Johnson (issued by Bally Records as catalog number 1033) reached #25 in its only week on the Billboard chart. The same year, United Kingdom singer Ruby Murray recorded a version on UK Columbia, catalog number DB 3994.

Eartha Kitt would also record the song and release it in 1963 with "An Englishman Needs Time" as a single on UK Columbia's label with the catalogue number DB 4985.

Paul McCartney has identified this song as a favorite of his and John Lennon's when they were growing up together in Liverpool.
