= Skitch Henderson =

American pianist, conductor, and composer (1918–2005)

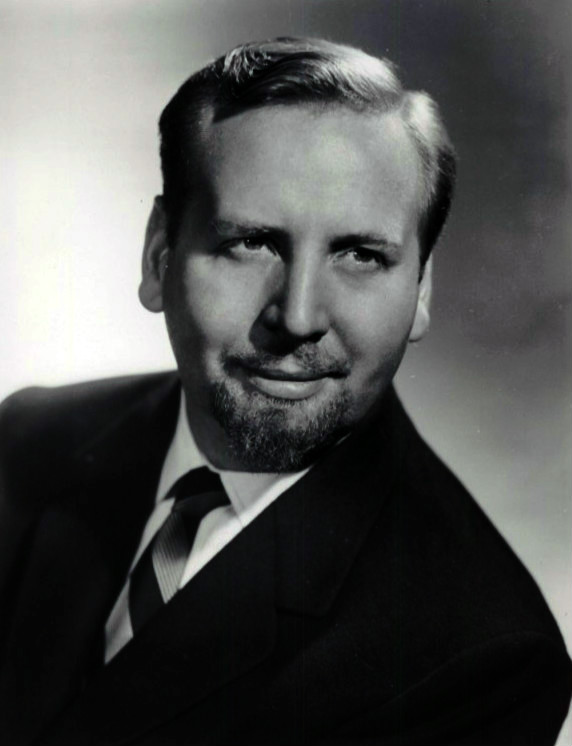
- Henderson in 1965

Background information
- Born: Lyle Russel Henderson; January 27, 1918; Halstad, Minnesota, U.S.
- Died: November 1, 2005 (aged 87) New Milford, Connecticut, U.S.
- Genres: Jazz, classical
- Occupations: Musician; composer; conductor
- Instrument: Piano
- Years active: 1937–2005
- Formerly of: The New York Pops, The Tonight Show Band
- Spouses: Faye Emerson (m. 1950; div. 1957) Ruth Einsiedel (m. 1958)

Lyle Russel "Skitch" Henderson (January 27, 1918 – November 1, 2005) was an American pianist, conductor, and composer. His nickname "Skitch" came from his ability to "re-sketch" a song in a different key. Bing Crosby suggested that he should use the name professionally.

== Early years ==
As his career developed, Henderson often claimed to have been born in Birmingham, England, also adding "Cedric" to his name. However, he was born in the town of Halstad in northwest Minnesota in 1918, to Joseph and Josephine (Scheie) Henderson, both of Norwegian descent. After his mother died when he was two in 1920, he was raised in Halstad by his aunt Hattie Henderson Gift and uncle Frank Gift. His aunt taught him piano, starting at the age of four. Although he did not receive formal conservatory education in music, Henderson received classical training under Fritz Reiner, Albert Coates, Arnold Schoenberg, Ernst Toch and Arturo Toscanini, who invited him to conduct the NBC Symphony Orchestra. Henderson would later recount apprenticeships in pop music while playing in taverns with notable singers of the era.

== Film ==
After starting his professional career in the 1930s playing piano in the roadhouses of the American Midwest, Henderson's major break came when he was an accompanist on a 1937 MGM promotional tour featuring Judy Garland and Mickey Rooney. Henderson later said that as a member of MGM's music department, he worked with Garland to learn "Over the Rainbow" during rehearsals for The Wizard of Oz and played piano for her first public performance of the song at a local nightclub before the film was finished. However this account is at odds with the memoirs of the tune's composer, Harold Arlen, who said he first performed the song for the 17-year-old Garland.

== Radio ==
Blue Network Varieties, which began May 20, 1940, on NBC's Pacific Coast Blue Network, featured Henderson in charge of the music, leading "a novelty instrumental group."

After the war, Henderson worked for NBC Radio Network, where he was the musical director for Frank Sinatra's Light-Up Time. He was also accompanist on Philco Radio Time with Bing Crosby on the new ABC network. Henderson also played on Bob Hope's Pepsodent Show.

In 1946, Henderson and the Golden Gate Quartet headlined a 13-week summer replacement program on NBC, sponsored by Old Gold cigarettes.

Beginning on June 13, 1950, Henderson had a program on WNBC in New York City from 6 to 8:30 a.m. Monday-Saturday. It was the that station's "largest time segment ever granted ... to a single personality". The program featured piano selections, recordings, light commentary, and other elements.

Henderson also recorded transcriptions for the Capitol Transcriptions service.

== Recordings ==
His recording career spanned the period from 78s to CDs. In 1946, Henderson formed his own orchestra and signed a contract with Capitol Records. Among his earliest releases for Capitol was a 3-disc set titled Keyboard Sketches.

Henderson recorded albums for Columbia Records from 1962 to 1969. He conducted a 1963 recording for RCA Victor of George Gershwin's Porgy and Bess with Leontyne Price and William Warfield, which won a Grammy Award.

Two albums as pianist for Arbors Records were released in the early 21st century, Swinging With Strings (2001) and Legends, with Bucky Pizzarelli (2003). Henderson also served as conductor of The New York Pops with Maureen McGovern on With a Song in My Heart: The Great Songs of Richard Rodgers for Reader's Digest and Centaur Records.

== Television ==
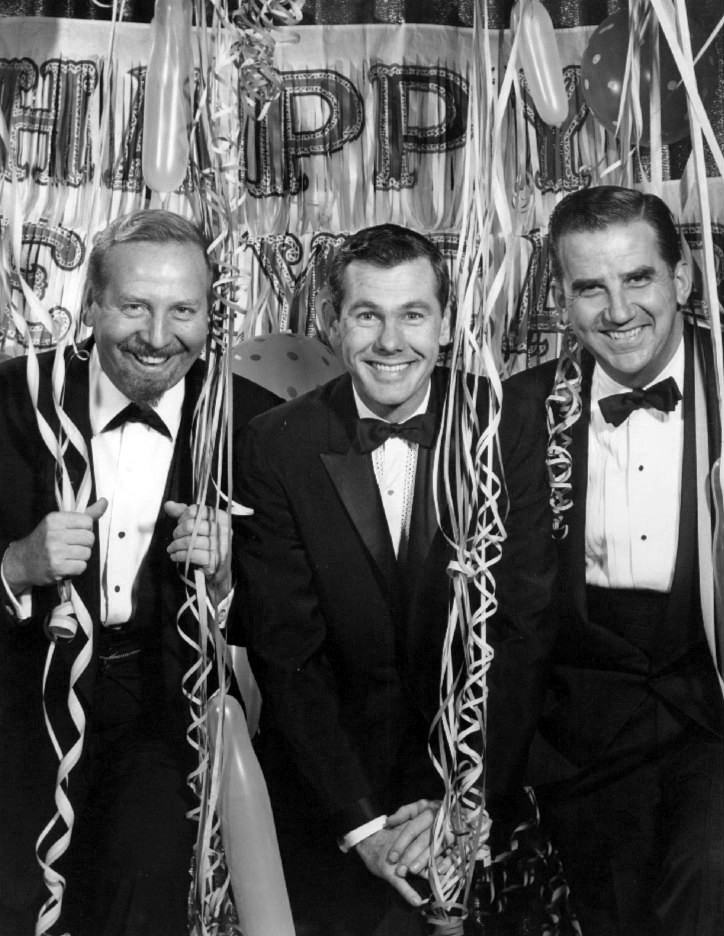
Henderson on The Tonight Show, New Year's Eve, 1962

In his career at NBC, Henderson was conductor of the orchestras for The Today Show, Tonight Starring Steve Allen and The Tonight Show Starring Johnny Carson. Henderson began his NBC work in 1951 and left in 1957 when Allen was replaced by Jack Paar, then returned when Carson took over and led the orchestra from 1962–1966 during Carson's early years as host and was replaced by Milton Delugg, who was succeeded by trumpeter Doc Severinsen who led the NBC Orchestra until Carson's retirement in 1992.

Henderson is credited for originating "Stump the Band", a recurring Tonight Show comedy routine in which audience members would name an obscure song for the band to play, and win a prize if they the band wasn't able to do so. The band would improvise a fake song on the spot to match the title. The routine was continued by Carson and Doc Severinson, long after Henderson left the show, and was also reprised by David Letterman and Paul Shaffer on Late Show with David Letterman.

== Conducting career ==
In 1983, Henderson founded The New York Pops orchestra, which makes its home at Carnegie Hall in New York City. He served as the music director and conductor of the orchestra until his death in 2005. Henderson also conducted numerous symphonic orchestras throughout the world.

His radio work included:

- California Melodies debuted 1940, Mutual Broadcasting, KHJ (AM)
- Songs by Sinatra 1946, CBS Radio
- I Deal in Crime 1946, ABC Radio
- Philco Radio Time starring Bing Crosby 1946, ABC
- Best of All 1954, NBC
- United States Air Force Presents 1969
- Skitch Henderson with the Music Makers

== Television programs ==
- Match Game, 1962–1963
- Password, 5 episodes, 1967
- Faye Emerson's Wonderful Town, co-host, 1951–1952
- What's My Line?, Mystery Guest, 1973

== Filmography ==
- Act One (1963)
- Who Says I Can't Ride a Rainbow! (1971)

He also wrote Baby Made a Change in Me for the 1948 movie On Our Merry Way.

== Awards and honors ==
In 1997, Henderson was honored for the vital role he played in the cultural life of New York City by being awarded the Handel Medallion, presented by the City of New York, New York.

On January 29, 2005, Henderson was awarded the Smithsonian Institution's highest honor, the James Smithson Bicentennial Medal. An exhibit highlighting the musician's career and showcasing the medal, "Skitch Henderson: A Man and His Music," was on display at the Smithsonian from January 30, 2005, to March 13, 2005.

Henderson was the recipient of three honorary degrees – from St. Thomas Aquinas College, the University of South Florida, and Western Connecticut State University.

== Miscellaneous ==
The Retro Swing Band at the University of Wisconsin plays arrangements from The Tonight Show and the BBC Dance Orchestra included in the Skitch Henderson Collection at the Mills Music Library.

Henderson was known for his distinctive "Hoo-hoo-hoo!" laugh on the The Tonight Show Starring Johnny Carson.

== Personal life ==
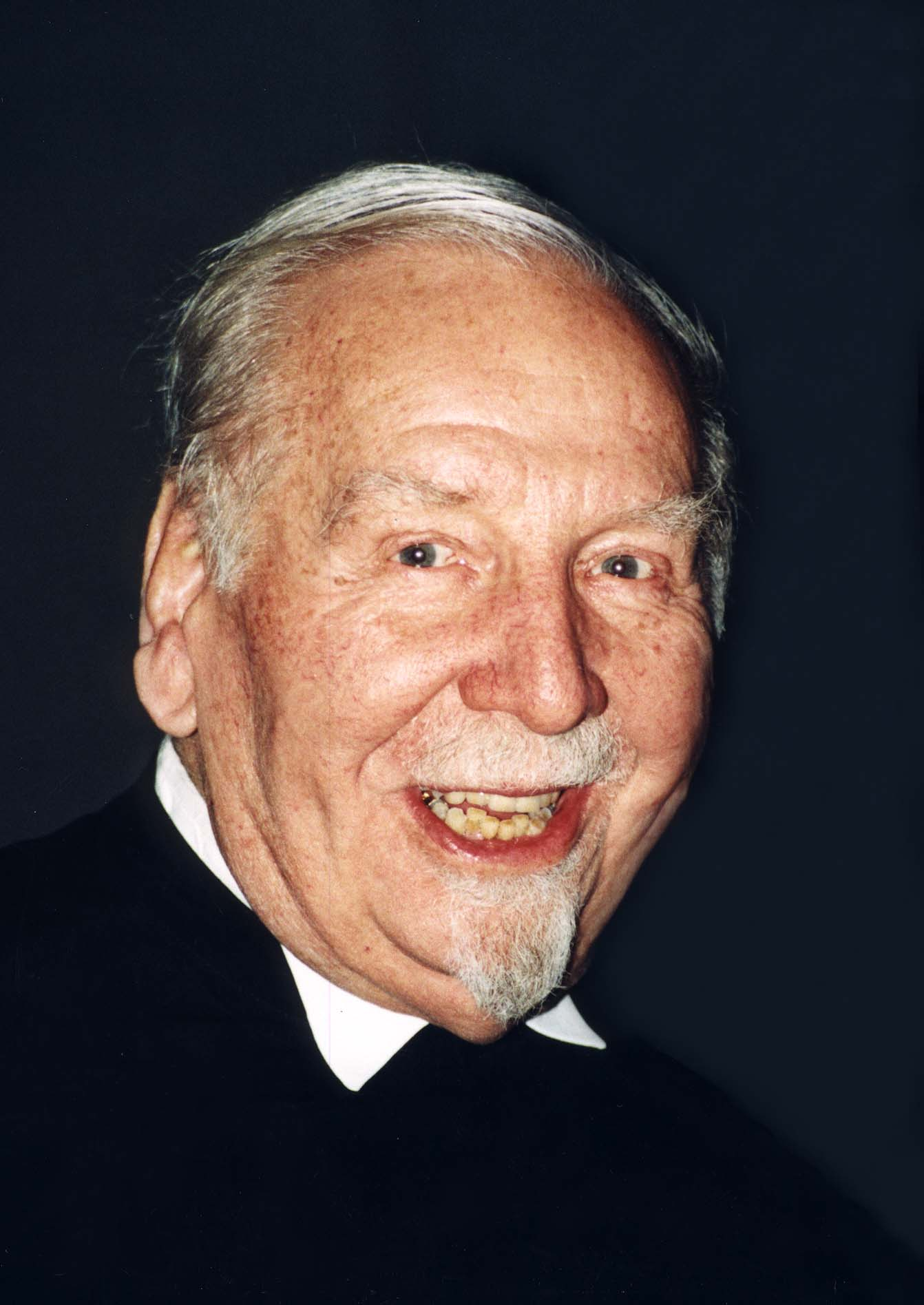
Henderson in 2000

Henderson married movie actress and television personality Faye Emerson in 1950. They were divorced seven years later.

In 1958, he then married Ruth Einsiedel and raised two children, Hans and Heidi. Hans was married to Sandra Watson for 18 years, before divorcing in 2000. Heidi was married to actor William Hurt from 1989 to 1992, and they have two sons.

From 1972 until his death, Ruth and Skitch Henderson owned and operated The Silo, a store, art gallery, and cooking school in New Milford, Connecticut. In 2003, Ruth and Skitch Henderson co-founded the Hunt Hill Farm Trust, an effort to preserve their farm's land and buildings and to celebrate Americana in music, art and literature through the creation of a living museum.

Henderson died of natural causes on November 1, 2005, at age 87.

== Legal problems ==
Henderson was indicted on July 2, 1974, on charges of tax evasion for the years 1969 and 1970, concerning claims about the value (allegedly $350,000) of a music library he donated to the University of Wisconsin–Madison. He further claimed he had consulted with Leonard Bernstein and Henry Mancini about the value of his collection, both of whom denied this in testimony at trial. A signature on an acceptance letter from the library director was also deemed a forgery. Henderson was convicted on two counts of filing false tax returns. He was acquitted on the tax evasion charges and obstructing a tax audit.

Henderson was sentenced on January 17, 1975, to six months in prison, and was fined US$10,000 (equivalent to $59,800 in 2025). He began serving his sentence at a minimum-security Federal prison on April 9, 1975, and was released after four months, on August 4, 1975.

== See also ==
- List of American composers

== Sources ==
- Skitch Henderson, Obituaries, Los Angeles Times, November 2, 2005.
- Ol' Blue Eyes and me. Patrice, John, Evening Mail (Birmingham, England), February 2, 2005.
- Skitch Henderson The New York Pops biography
- The Road From Vaudeville to Carnegie Hall
- Associated Press: Skitch Henderson Dies at 87
- Hunt Hill Farm Trust

Media offices
Preceded by None	The Tonight Show bandleader 1954–1957	Succeeded by José Melis
Preceded by José Melis	The Tonight Show bandleader 1962–1966	Succeeded by Milton DeLugg
