= Leonard Nimoy Presents Mr. Spock's Music from Outer Space =

Album by Leonard Nimoy

Studio album by Leonard Nimoy
- Released: April 1967
- Genre: Outsider music, spoken word
- Label: Dot
- Producer: Charles Randolph Grean

Leonard Nimoy chronology
Leonard Nimoy Presents Mr. Spock's Music from Outer Space (1967)	Two Sides of Leonard Nimoy (1968)

Mr. Spock Presents Music from Outer Space

Studio album by Leonard Nimoy
- Released: 1973
- Genre: Outsider music, spoken word
- Label: Rediffusion
- Producer: Charles Randolph Grean (not credited)

Leonard Nimoy Presents Mr. Spock's Music from Outer Space is the debut album of Leonard Nimoy, recorded in character as Mr. Spock from the NBC TV series Star Trek. It was released in April 1967 by Dot Records and reached number 83 on the Billboard 200.

== Background ==
The album capitalized on the popularity of the Spock character on Star Trek. The songs contain many outer-space elements, science fiction-themed narrations, and space sound effects. Opening with a rendition of the show's main theme, the album also features a take on the theme to Mission: Impossible, which Nimoy would incidentally go on to join as a cast member in 1969. Also featured is an instrumental version of the song "Beyond Antares", written for the Star Trek episode "The Conscience of the King" and originally sung by Nichelle Nichols. Nimoy sings two show tunes, "Where Is Love?" (from Oliver!) and "Lost in the Stars" (from the musical of the same name). Closing track "A Visit to a Sad Planet" is a spoken word science fiction piece that was released as a single and charted at number 121 on Billboard.

Professional ratings
Review scores
Source	Rating
Allmusic	link

== Track listing ==
=== Side one ===
1. "Theme from Star Trek" (Alexander Courage, Gene Roddenberry)
2. "Alien" (Cy Coben)
3. "Where Is Love?" (Lionel Bart)
4. "Music to Watch Space Girls By" (Anthony Velona, Sidney Ramin)
5. "Beyond Antares" (Wilbur Hatch, Gene Coon)
6. "Twinkle, Twinkle, Little Earth" (Charles R. Grean, Fred Hertz, Leonard Nimoy)

=== Side two ===
1. "Mission: Impossible" (Lalo Schifrin)
2. "Lost in the Stars" (Maxwell Anderson, Kurt Weill)
3. "Where No Man Has Gone Before" (Alexander Courage)
4. "You Are Not Alone" (Don Christopher)
5. "A Visit to a Sad Planet" (Charles R. Grean, Don Christopher)

"A Visit to a Sad Planet" was released as a single, with "Theme from Star Trek" on the b-side. It became Nimoy's only hit single, reaching number 121 on the Billboard chart. The album itself reached number 83 on the magazine's album charts.

=== Re-release ===
The album was re-released in the UK in 1973 on the Rediffusion label as Mr. Spock Presents Music From Outer Space. The track listing is identical to the original Dot Records release, but with a new sleeve design by Stephen Hill Design Services, including a different photo of Nimoy as Spock (front), and new liner notes by Ron Edwards (rear). It was re-released again on October 10, 1995, by Varèse Sarabande. This reissue features side one of the LP Two Sides of Leonard Nimoy as a bonus.

1. "Theme from Star Trek" (Alexander Courage, Gene Roddenberry)
2. "Alien" (Cy Coben)
3. "Where Is Love?" (Lionel Bart)
4. "Music to Watch Space Girls By" (Anthony Velona, Sidney Ramin)
5. "Beyond Antares" (Wilbur Hatch, Gene Coon)
6. "Twinkle, Twinkle, Little Earth" (Charles R. Grean, Fred Hertz, Leonard Nimoy)
7. "Mission: Impossible" (Lalo Schifrin)
8. "Lost in the Stars" (Maxwell Anderson, Kurt Weill)
9. "Where No Man Has Gone Before" (Courage)
10. "You Are Not Alone" (Don Christopher)
11. "A Visit to a Sad Planet" (Grean, Christopher)
12. "Highly Illogical" (Grean, Hertz)
13. "The Difference Between Us" (Coben)
14. "Once I Smiled" (Grean, Nimoy)
15. "Spock Thoughts" (Grean)
16. "By Myself" (Howard Dietz, Arthur Schwartz)
17. "Follow Your Star" (Grean, Hertz)
18. "Amphibious Assault" (Grean, Mason Williams)
