= Highly Illogical =

Studio album by Leonard Nimoy
- Released: 1993
- Genre: Outsider music, spoken word, pop, country, novelty
- Length: 52:28
- Label: Rev-Ola Records

Leonard Nimoy chronology
| Outer Space/Inner Mind (1974) | Highly Illogical (1993) | Spaced Out (1997) |

Highly Illogical is an album which contains a collection of songs performed by Star Trek actor Leonard Nimoy. Most of the songs were originally recorded in the 1960s. The collection includes "The Ballad of Bilbo Baggins", which tells the story of J.R.R. Tolkien's book The Hobbit, and has been included on various novelty compilations.

The title song, "Highly Illogical", features Spock pointing out the foibles of human thought, such as relationships, automobiles, and greed.

== Track listing ==
1. "Highly Illogical" - 2:23
2. "If I Had a Hammer" - 2:10
3. "The Difference Between Us" - 2:14
4. "Ruby, Don't Take Your Love to Town" - 2:49
5. "Where It's At" - 2:22
6. "Abraham, Martin and John" - 3:20
7. "Contact" - 2:24
8. "Nature Boy" - 2:16
9. "Consilium" - 2:31
10. "Everybody's Talkin'" - 2:59
11. "Here We Go Round Again" - 2:20
12. "Proud Mary" - 3:20
13. "Once I Smiled" - 2:13
14. "Both Sides, Now" - 2:55
15. "The Ballad of Bilbo Baggins" - 2:23
16. "I Walk the Line" - 2:19
17. "Amphibious Assault" - 2:51
18. "If I Were a Carpenter" - 2:47
19. "Spock Thoughts" - 3:03
20. "Love of the Common People" - 2:41
