= The Old American Barn Dance =

American country music television series

- Title screen
- Directed by: Fred A. Niles
- Presented by: Bill Bailey
- Country of origin: United States
- No. of episodes: 11

Production
- Camera setup: Multi-camera
- Running time: 25 minutes

Original release
- Network: DuMont
- Release: July 5 – September 13, 1953

The Old American Barn Dance is an American country music television series broadcast by the DuMont Television Network from July 5 to September 13, 1953.

== Production ==
The summer replacement program, hosted by Bill Bailey, aired on Sunday nights from 10:30–11 p.m. Eastern Time. The series was filmed at Kling Studios, 639 N. Fairbank Court at Ohio Street, in Chicago, Illinois.

Performers included Tennessee Ernie Ford, Pee Wee King, the Candy Mountain Girls, the Chordmen, Merle Travis, Kenny Roberts, Johnny Bond, Homer and Jethro, Patsy Montana and the Kentucky Thoroughbreds.

In 1959, episodes were edited together with segments from Eddy Arnold Time and Jimmy Dean's Town and Country Time (a local Washington, D.C. program) and syndicated by producer Bernard L. Schubert under the title, Your Musical Jamboree.

== Episode status ==
Three episodes are held in the J. Fred MacDonald collection at the Library of Congress.

== See also ==
- List of programs broadcast by the DuMont Television Network
- List of surviving DuMont Television Network broadcasts

== Bibliography ==
- David Weinstein, The Forgotten Network: DuMont and the Birth of American Television (Philadelphia: Temple University Press, 2004) ISBN 1-59213-245-6
- Alex McNeil, Total Television, Fourth edition (New York: Penguin Books, 1980) ISBN 0-14-024916-8
- Tim Brooks and Earle Marsh, The Complete Directory to Prime Time Network TV Shows, Third edition (New York: Ballantine Books, 1964) ISBN 0-345-31864-1
- Ira Gallen. "The Old American Barn Dance".
