= Bob Carroll (singer/actor) =

American singer and actor (1918–1994)

- Today's Hits with Bob Carroll

Background information
- Born: Robert Carroll; June 8, 1918
- Died: November 12, 1994 (aged 76); Port Washington, New York
- Occupations: Singer, actor
- Formerly of: Charlie Barnet, Jimmy Dorsey, Glenn Miller, Gordon Jenkins

Robert Carroll (June 8, 1918 – November 12, 1994) was an American big band singer and stage, film and television actor.

== Early years ==
Bob Carroll was born Mark Kaufman in New York, NY. The son of a piano salesman, Carroll attended high school in Brooklyn.

== Singer ==
Carroll's singing career was interrupted by three years' service in the U.S. Army during World War II. When he returned to civilian life, he joined Jimmy Dorsey's orchestra.

Carroll also sang with other orchestras, including Charlie Barnet and Glenn Miller in the 1940s and Gordon Jenkins (for whom he recorded the hit "Charmaine" in 1951) in the 1950s. He is heard on the soundtrack of The Prowler (1951) singing "Baby". In 1957, his version of "Butterfly" on Bally Records made the charts, peaking at No. 61 on the Billboard Hot 100.

In the mid-1960s, Carroll was host and singer on All Time Hits, a musical program on WGN-TV in Chicago.

== Actor ==
In the 1960s, Carroll turned to acting and his stage career peaked in those years. On television, he appeared both in soap operas and prime time series. He performed on Songs for Sale (1950–1952) and was a regular vocalist on NBC's Judge for Yourself, starring Fred Allen, which aired in the 1953–1954 season.

In the theater, Carroll performed in various touring productions of Fiddler on the Roof, including in 1966 (playing Lazar) and 1968 (playing Tevye) as well as the 1989 pre-Broadway tour (playing Morcha). He played the title role in the first national tour of Fiorello! He also played 1984 touring production of La Cage aux Folles (playing Edouard Dindon). Other touring productions in which he appeared included Guys and Dolls, The Pajama Game and Say, Darling.

== Death ==
Carroll died at the age of 76 in Port Washington, New York, where he resided.
