= Two Sides of Leonard Nimoy =

Studio album by Leonard Nimoy
- Released: February 1968
- Genre: Outsider music, spoken word, pop, country, novelty, filk
- Label: Dot
- Producer: Charles R. Grean, George Aliceson Tipton

Leonard Nimoy chronology
Leonard Nimoy Presents Mr. Spock's Music from Outer Space (1967)	Two Sides of Leonard Nimoy (1968)	The Way I Feel (1968)

Two Sides of Leonard Nimoy is Leonard Nimoy's second album released shortly after Music from Outer Space. It was released in early 1968 by Dot Records and reached 97 on the US album chart.

== Background ==
The album is a continuation of the "Spock and Space" sound on which Nimoy embarked on his debut album. Side one showcases the side fans know as Mr. Spock but in a softer light, along with his struggle between being human and Vulcan. Side two represents Nimoy's interests in a variety of songs: novelty, pop, country and love songs.

Side one of this album is presented on the Varèse Sarabande Records 1995 reissue of Leonard Nimoy Presents Mr. Spock's Music from Outer Space.

Professional ratings
Review scores
Source	Rating
Allmusic	link

== Track listing ==
=== Side one ===
1. "Highly Illogical" (Charles R. Grean, Fred Hertz)
2. "The Difference Between Us" (Cy Coben)
3. "Once I Smiled" (Grean, Leonard Nimoy)
4. "Spock Thoughts" (Grean, Max Ehrmann¹)
5. "By Myself" (Howard Dietz, Arthur Schwartz)
6. "Follow Your Star" (Grean, Hertz)
7. "Amphibious Assault" (Grean, Mason Williams)

=== Side two ===
1. "The Ballad of Bilbo Baggins" (Grean)
2. "Cotton Candy" (Cliff Ralke)
3. "Gentle on My Mind" (John Hartford)
4. "Miranda" (Bart Howard)
5. "If I Were a Carpenter" (Tim Hardin)
6. "Love of the Common People" (John Hurley, Ronnie Wilkins)

== Production ==
- Produced by Charles R. Grean and Tom Mack
- Arranged and conducted by Charles R. Grean
- The lyrics of "Spock Thoughts" are in fact the prose poem "Desiderata" by Max Ehrmann.
