= The Touch of Leonard Nimoy =

Studio album by Leonard Nimoy
- Released: June 1969
- Genre: Outsider music Folk music
- Label: Dot
- Producer: Charles R. Grean; George Aliceson Tipton

Leonard Nimoy chronology
The Way I Feel (1968)	The Touch of Leonard Nimoy (1969)	The New World of Leonard Nimoy (1970)

The Touch of Leonard Nimoy is the fourth studio album released from Leonard Nimoy. The album was released in 1969, on Dot Records.

== Background ==
Continuing with the folk sound and direction he established with his previous album, the songs range from optimism, political awareness, the human condition, living together, and love.

Nimoy recorded "Just Can't Help Believing", "Trip to Nowhere", "Piece of Hope", and "Maiden Wine" on 7 October 1968, and on the 21st, recorded "Cycles", "Now's The Time", "I Search for Tomorrow", and "Nature Boy". As of November 1968, the record had not yet been titled.

The song "Maiden Wine" was featured in the Star Trek episode, "Plato's Stepchildren". It is the song sung by Spock while he was being manipulated by the Platonians in 2268 (hence the "serenade from the laughing spaceman", as originally named). It had been composed on a vacation weekend at Lake Arrowhead.

== Track listing ==
=== Side one ===
1. "I Search for Tomorrow" (Paul Evans, Paul Parnes)
2. "Maiden Wine" (Leonard Nimoy)
3. "Now's the Time" (Val Stoecklein)
4. "Cycles" (Gayle Caldwell)
5. "I Think it's Gonna Rain Today" (Randy Newman)

=== Side two ===
1. "I Just Can't Help Believin'" (Barry Mann, Cynthia Weil)
2. "Nature Boy" (Eden Ahbez)
3. "Contact" (Nimoy, George Tipton)
4. "The Man I Would Like to Be" (Nimoy, George Tipton)
5. "A Trip to Nowhere" (Don Costa, Johnny Crystal)
6. "Piece of Hope" (Leonard Nimoy)

== Production ==
- Producer: Charles R. Grean
- Arranger and Conductor: George Tipton
- Engineers: Thorne Nogar and Dave Wiechman
- Cover Photography: Tommy Mitchell
- Art Direction: Christopher Whorf
