= The New World of Leonard Nimoy =

Studio album by Leonard Nimoy
- Released: June 1970
- Genres: Folk music Country music
- Label: Dot
- Producer: Steve Clark

Leonard Nimoy chronology
The Touch of Leonard Nimoy (1969)	The New World of Leonard Nimoy (1970)

The New World of Leonard Nimoy is the fifth and final album of Leonard Nimoy. Dot Records released the album in June 1970.

== Background ==
Unlike the four previous albums, there was no production input from Charles R. Grean or George Tipton. Instead, the production was provided by a crew of different producers, arrangers, and engineers who gave the album a country sound. Nevertheless, the album featured Nimoy's theme of songs about the human condition, love, and people living together in the world.

== Track listing ==
=== Side one ===
1. "Time To Get It Together" (Smokey Roberds)
2. "Ruby, Don't Take Your Love to Town" (Mel Tillis)
3. "The Mayor of Ma's Cafe" (Paul Hampton)
4. "I Walk the Line" (Johnny Cash)
5. "I Finally Saw the Two of You Today" (Bruce Belland, David Somerville)
6. "Mary's Near" (Allen Wayne, Henry Capps)

=== Side two ===
1. "Abraham, Martin and John" (Dick Holler)
2. "Proud Mary" (John Fogerty)
3. "Let it Be Me" (Gilbert Bécaud, Pierre Delanoë)
4. "Everybody's Talkin'" (Fred Neil)
5. "The Sun Will Rise" (Leonard Nimoy)
6. "Put a Little Love in Your Heart" (Jackie DeShannon, Randy James Myers, James E. Holiday)

== Production ==
- Produced by Steve Clark
- Arranged by Ben Benay except "The Mayor Of Ma's Cafe," "Proud Mary," "The Sun Will Rise," and "Put A Little Love In Your Heart" by Mike Henderson
- Recorded at Harmony Recorders, Hollywood, California
