= Eddy Arnold Time =

US television program

- The Gordonaires (AKA The Jordanaires), Betty Johnson, and Eddy Arnold as themselves in the episode, "Sunday at Home"
- Genre: Musical
- Written by: Ben Park
- Directed by: Ben Park
- Starring: Eddy Arnold; Betty Johnson; The Gordonaires
- Opening theme: "Bouquet of Roses"
- Country of origin: United States
- Original language: English
- No. of episodes: 26

Production
- Executive producer: Joe Csida
- Producer: Ben Park
- Production locations: Kling Studios, Chicago
- Cinematography: Robert Sable; Haskell Wexler
- Editor: Richard Hertel
- Camera setup: Multi-camera
- Running time: 30 minutes (26 minutes excluding ads)
- Production companies: Csida-Grean Associates; Eddy Arnold Enterprises

Original release
- Network: First-run syndication
- Release: January 1, 1955 – October 1957

Eddy Arnold Time is an American musical television series syndicated to local stations from 1955 through 1957. The show consisted of 26 half-hour filmed episodes starring Eddy Arnold in different roles within a musical narrative. Arnold portrayed, among others, a lumberjack, a traveling salesman, a cowboy, a pet shop owner, himself, and even Stephen Foster.

== Production and cast ==
Produced, directed and written by Chicago NBC veteran Ben Park, the series featured Betty Johnson, who usually played Arnold's romantic interest; and in supporting roles, the Jordanaires, using the name Gordonaires. A promotional booklet for the program explained that the group used the name Jordanaires "only for their recordings." The more complete explanation is that it legally protected the producers in case the group, which owned the name Jordanaires, left the program prematurely. For this show, the group was composed of Hoyt Hawkins, Hugh Jarett, Neal Matthews, Jr. and Gordon Stoker. Guitarist Hank Garland and Roy Wiggins (steel guitar) also made occasional appearances. A young Ed Asner appeared in one episode.

The producers termed the program, filmed at Kling Studios in Chicago, Illinois, a TV filmusical. Production began in October 1954; it was among the earliest syndicated American TV programs. Although popular in some small markets, it suffered from uninspired performances and storylines, a poor soundtrack and inadequate marketing.

In 1959, episodes were edited together with segments from The Old American Barn Dance and Jimmy Dean's Town and Country Time (a local Washington, D.C. program) and syndicated by producer Bernard L. Schubert under the title, Your Musical Jamboree.

== Episodes (22 of 26) ==
- "Poor Lonesome Cowboys"
- "The Bayou Baby and the Traveling Salesman"
- "At the Logging Camp"
- "On a Picnic"
- "The Deacon's Hoedown"
- "At a Canteen"
- "The 'Come as You Are' Party"
- "The Birthday Party Rehearsal"
- "Sunday at Home"
- "The Last of the Bad Men"
- "An Old Fashioned Melodrama"
- "Gamblers, Gunmen and Sarsaparilla"
- "Discovery in a Pet Shop"
- "Wedding Day"
- "At the Church Social"
- "The Stephen Foster Story"
- "Reminiscing in a Record Shop"
- "'Round the Merry-go-round"
- "The Pioneers Head West"
- "Dr. Eddy's Medicine Show"
- "Found: Two Lost Lovers"
- "At the Country Store"
- "The Cornhusking Bee"
- "The Railroaders' Surprise"
