= Jack Paar Tonite =

1973 American late-night talk show

- Genre: Late-night talk show
- Directed by: Hal Gurnee
- Starring: Jack Paar
- Announcer: Peggy Cass
- Music by: Charles Randolph Grean (bandleader)
- Country of origin: United States
- Original language: English
- No. of episodes: ~45

Production
- Producer: Bob Carmen
- Production location: New York City
- Running time: 90 minutes

Original release
- Network: ABC
- Release: January 8, 1973 – November 1973

Related
- Tonight Starring Jack Paar; The Jack Paar Program; ABC's Wide World of Entertainment

Jack Paar Tonite is an American late-night talk show hosted by Jack Paar that aired on ABC in 1973 as part of the network's late-night programming block ABC's Wide World of Entertainment. The series marked Paar's return to late-night television more than a decade after leaving NBC's Tonight Starring Jack Paar, on which he had become one of the pioneers of the modern television talk show.

== Background ==
Paar had hosted NBC's Tonight Show from 1957 until 1962 and subsequently hosted the weekly Jack Paar Program until 1965. ABC brought him back to late-night television as one of the principal hosts of Wide World of Entertainment, a rotating collection of talk shows, comedy and variety specials, documentaries, concerts, and television films.

== Format and schedule ==
Under the original scheduling arrangement, Paar's program occupied one week of the monthly rotation. Other weeks were assigned to The Dick Cavett Show, comedy and variety programming, and mystery films. The format represented ABC's latest effort to compete with NBC's The Tonight Show Starring Johnny Carson rather than relying upon a single nightly host....rather than relying upon a single nightly host.

The series followed the interview and conversational style that had characterized Paar's earlier work on The Tonight Show. Episodes featured celebrity interviews, discussions of current events, and comedy segments. Paar was particularly associated with informal, personality-driven conversations rather than tightly scripted interviews.

Actress and comedian Peggy Cass served as the show's announcer and Paar's on-air sidekick. The program's orchestra was led by bandleader and composer Charles Randolph Grean.

The show was directed by Hal Gurnee, who had been Paar's director on the Tonight show and went on to be David Letterman's director on Late Night with David Letterman and Late Show with David Letterman.

== Notable guests ==
Paar brought back several personalities associated with his earlier television programs. During the show's opening week, guests included comedian Jonathan Winters and French-born entertainer Geneviève, while footage of the late pianist Oscar Levant from one of Paar's earlier programs was also shown.

The program featured the national television debuts of comedians Freddie Prinze and Martin Mull, Prinze appearing before receiving his major breakthrough later in 1973 on The Tonight Show Starring Johnny Carson.

Other guests included the Smothers Brothers, who appeared on the April 30 broadcast in what was publicized as their first national television appearance following the resolution of their lawsuit against CBS. The same week featured Stiller and Meara, former senator Eugene McCarthy, diplomat and writer Clare Boothe Luce, and broadcaster Joe Garagiola.

== Conflict with gay activists ==
In early 1973, the New York–based Gay Activists Alliance (GAA) complained to ABC about anti-gay remarks made by Paar and other television entertainers. GAA president Bruce Voeller wrote to Paar after Paar used disparaging language about gay men, arguing that such remarks reinforced prejudice against homosexuals. Paar subsequently telephoned the organization, apologized for comments that might have caused offence, and invited GAA representatives to appear on the program.

Voeller had also complained to Dick Cavett and ABC executive Grace Johnson about anti-gay jokes and terminology used on television. According to the contemporary gay newspaper Gay, Paar agreed to devote part of his March 8 broadcast to the dispute, although he reportedly objected when the GAA insisted that its delegation include both men and a woman.

The broadcast featured Voeller, Arnie Kantrowitz and Nathalie Rockhill. During the discussion, Paar defended some of his remarks, objected to what he described as homosexual “proselytizing”, and questioned why entertainers should not use terms such as “fairy”. Kantrowitz explained that such language was objectionable because it reduced gay people to stereotypes. A recording of the segment, made by a GAA member using an early home-video recorder, has subsequently circulated publicly.

== End of the series ==
Jack Paar Tonite ended in November 1973 after approximately eleven months. Because the program appeared for only one week each month as part of ABC's rotating schedule, it did not have the continuity of a nightly talk show. At the beginning of the experiment, Time questioned whether audiences accustomed to watching the same program every night would continue to follow hosts and formats that disappeared from the schedule for several weeks at a time, a format that made it difficult to grow and retain an audience because viewers were accustomed to following the same late-night program each evening.
