= Alexander King (author) =

American humorist, memoirist and media personality (1899–1965)

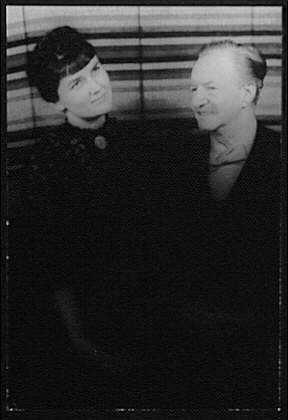
Alexander King and his third wife Margie (Mary Lou Swett) in 1962; she was widowed three years later.

Alexander King (November 13, 1899 – November 16, 1965), born Alexander Rosenfeld, was a humorist, memoirist, and media personality of the early television era, based in the United States.

== Early life ==
Alexander King was born on November 13, 1899, in the Austro-Hungarian city of Vienna. His family moved to the United States just before the First World War.

== Career ==
In 1958, King published the book Mine Enemy Grows Older. Its popularity brought him public acclaim, and he was soon invited onto The Tonight Show that was hosted Jack Paar. He became a frequent guest on the show.

May This House Be Safe From Tigers was published in January, 1960, and I Should Have Kissed Her More exactly a year later. Is There a Life After Birth? appeared in 1963.

On November 15, 1965, Simon & Schuster published King's book Rich Man, Poor Man, Freud and Fruit. Early the following morning he appeared on network television to promote it. He appeared on a live segment of NBC's Today Show, for which King visited the NBC studio where Barbara Walters and Hugh Downs anchored the show.

Despite King's excellent articulation on nationwide television early in the morning, without slurring speech, he became ill shortly after returning from the NBC studio to his Manhattan home, which was at 1225 Park Avenue. Later that day, he entered Lenox Hill Hospital and died of natural causes, age 66. King's New York Times obituary identifies his current wife as "Margie." Other sources identify her as Mary Lou Swett. The Times says this is his third marriage. The Times obituary closes with: "Besides his wife, Mr. King leaves two sons by a previous marriage, Robin and Mervin. The funeral will be private."
