= The Johnson Family Singers =

American singing family

The Johnson Family Singers were an American singing family in the 1940s.

== History ==
The Johnson Family Singers were a musical group that consisted of a father Jesse ("Pa"), mother Lydia ("Ma"), and four children: Kenneth (Red), Betty, and twins Bob and Jim. The family lived in an apartment in Greensboro, North Carolina, and struggled to survive during the Great Depression. Jesse worked as a house painter and mill worker.

In the fall of 1937, Jesse returned from the Stamps-Baxter Music School in Dallas, Texas, where he was inspired by the emerging Gospel music of the day. He became a teacher of shape note music. His first students were his children, at the time 10, 9, and 7 years old respectively. They began to sing at family reunions and churches.

In 1940, the family attended a singing convention at the Armory Auditorium in Charlotte, NC. This led to 50,000-watt radio station WBT asking the family to sing on "Grady Cole's Sunday Morning Farm Club". The family's signature song on the program was "There’s a Little Pine Log Cabin". They would go on to sing on several CBS Radio Network programs.

In the late 1940s, the Johnson Family recorded 52 songs for Columbia Records, under the direction of Art Satherley. Later, a similar number of songs were recorded on the RCA-Victor label. Their contract with Quaker Oats ended their radio career in May 1951.

The family appeared on The Ed Sullivan Show in 1958. Over the next 40 years, Betty Johnson had a solo career of her own.
