= The Way I Feel (Leonard Nimoy album) =

Studio album by Leonard Nimoy
- Released: 1968
- Genre: Folk pop
- Label: Dot
- Producer: Charles R. Grean; George Aliceson Tipton

Leonard Nimoy chronology
Two Sides of Leonard Nimoy (1968)	The Way I Feel (1968)	The Touch of Leonard Nimoy (1969)

The Way I Feel is the third studio album by Leonard Nimoy. It was released in August 1968 by Dot Records, less than a year after Two Sides of Leonard Nimoy was released.

== Background ==
Unlike the first two albums, Nimoy stepped away from his Mr. Spock persona on this album. There are no science fiction or Spock themed songs or outer space sound effects featured on the album. Instead, the album consists of folk and pop songs. However, it is believed that the spoken word tracks, "Consilium" and "Where It's At" loosely tie into the Spock persona.

Recording for the album began in Los Angeles on 24 April 1968, during which was cut (from several takes) "I'd Love Making Love to You", "Please Don't Try to Change My Mind", "Where it's At", and "Hitchhiker." Nimoy's parents were in attendance having flown from Boston for a week-long visit. The second recording session occurred on 15 May, at which "It's Getting Better", "Here We Go 'Round Again" and "If I Had a Hammer" were cut. The third and final recording session was on 17 May, at which "Love is Sweeter", "Sunny", "Consilium", and "Both Sides Now" were cut.

== Track listing ==
=== Side one ===
1. "I'd Love Making Love to You" (David Schudson)
2. "Please Don't Try to Change My Mind" (Don Christopher, Leonard Nimoy)
3. "Sunny" (Bobby Hebb)
4. "Where It's At" (Cy Coben)
5. "Both Sides Now" (Joni Mitchell)
6. "If I Had a Hammer" (Pete Seeger, Lee Hays)

=== Side two ===
1. "Here We Go 'Round Again" (Paul Evans, Paul Parnes)
2. "Billy Don't Play the Banjo Anymore" (Randy Sparks)
3. "It's Getting Better" (Barry Mann, Cynthia Weil)
4. "Consilium" (Leonard Nimoy, Charles R. Grean)
5. "Love Is Sweeter" (John Hartford)
6. "The Hitch-Hiker" (David Somerville, Bruce Belland)

== Production ==
- Produced by Charles R. Grean and Tom Mack
- Arranged by George Tipton ("Both Sides Now", "If I Had A Hammer", "Here We Go 'Round Again" and "It's Getting Better"),
- Arranged by Charles R. Grean ("Where It's At", "Billy Don't Play The Banjo Anymore", "Consilium" and "The Hitch-Hiker"), Ray Pohlman ("I'd Love Making Love To You" and "Please Don't Try To Change My Mind"), and Bill Stafford ("Sunny").
- Engineered by Thorne Nogar.
