= The Ballad of Bilbo Baggins =

1967 song by Charles Randolph Grean

Single by Leonard Nimoy

from the album Two Sides of Leonard Nimoy
- B-side: "Cotton Candy"
- Released: July 1967
- Genre: Filk
- Length: 2:18
- Label: Dot
- Songwriter: Charles Randolph Grean

"The Ballad of Bilbo Baggins" is a song composed by Charles Randolph Grean and performed by Leonard Nimoy, telling the story of Bilbo Baggins and his adventures in J. R. R. Tolkien's 1937 novel The Hobbit. The recording was featured on the 1968 album Two Sides of Leonard Nimoy, the second of Nimoy's albums on Dot Records. It was also released as a single (Dot Records Cat. #45-17028) in July 1967, backed with a "modern thought-image" folk song called "Cotton Candy".

When the single was originally released, Nimoy lip-synched to the recording during a guest appearance on the July 28, 1967 episode of Malibu U, a short-lived variety television series. This segment survives as a "music video" and shows Nimoy (wearing his Star Trek hairstyle as the series was in the midst of production of its second season at the time) and a group of color-coordinated young women, all wearing plastic pointed ears (presumably like Vulcans as Hobbits only had slightly pointed ears in Tolkien's writing), singing and dancing an overtly strange, hopping-waddling dance on a beach. Clothing and random objects would fly up from behind a hill, and a variety of buttons with typical Hobbit/Star Trek slogans ("Hobbits Unite!", "Admit Middle-earth to the U.N.!", "What's a Leonard Nimoy?") were occasionally visible.

According to the Demented Music Database, between 1974 and 2024, the song was played more than 100 times on the Dr. Demento Show. It was also included on the two-disc compilation album, Dementia 2000: Dr. Demento's 30th Anniversary Collection.

Since its rediscovery on the BBC2 documentary Funk Me Up Scotty and propagation over the Internet, it has been treated as an example of 1960s camp. An excerpt from the musical number is included in the documentaries Ringers: Lord of the Fans about The Lord of the Rings fandom, and in For the Love of Spock. The song was also included in the 1993 Nimoy compilation album Highly Illogical.

== References to the song ==
An audio clip of the song was played as part of an answer on an episode of Jeopardy! aired January 5, 2006. The song was sampled by Bentley Rhythm Ace for their track "Theme From 'Gutbuster'" on their album For Your Ears Only, released in 2000. Segments of the song were shown during Bring Back... Star Trek, with Justin Lee Collins citing it as research into Leonard Nimoy.

In a 2013 Audi advertisement featuring Nimoy and Zachary Quinto (who played Spock in the Kelvin timeline films), Nimoy speaks the first few lines of the song, ending with "go Bilbo!".
