= Footlight Varieties =

1951 film directed by Hal Yates

- Directed by: Hal Yates; Doran Cox (assistant)
- Screenplay by: Hal Yates; Felix Adler
- Produced by: George Bilson
- Starring: Jack Paar; Leon Errol
- Cinematography: J. Roy Hunt; Frank Redman; Jack MacKenzie; G. W. Bitzer; Arthur Marvin
- Edited by: Edward W. Williams; Jay Whittredge
- Music by: Constantin Bakaleinikoff
- Production company: RKO Radio Pictures
- Release date: March 21, 1951 (US)
- Running time: 61 minutes
- Country: United States
- Language: English

Footlight Varieties is the third of four titles in RKO Radio Pictures' series of variety features, combining previously filmed shorts with new musical numbers, introduced by master of ceremonies Jack Paar. The new footage was directed by Hal Yates and written by Yates and Felix Adler.

== Summary ==
Footlight Varieties has no storyline; the film simulates a variety hour as might be seen in a theater or on television. Jack Paar delivers an opening monologue, and introduces a big-band number by Frankie Carle and his orchestra (from the 1947 musical short Carle Comes Calling). The Sportsmen quartet sings three selections, and there is a display of comic trick photography by Weegee. Leon Errol is seen in a lengthy extract from his 1944 two-reel comedy He Forgot to Remember. In a comedy sketch, Red Buttons plays a contestant on a radio quiz show, opposite emcee Paar. A silent-movie revival taken from Flicker Flashbacks #12 (1945) presents "Confidence", filmed by D. W. Griffith in 1909, with wisecracking narration by Jack Paar. Liberace performs classical and boogie-woogie piano. Inesita offers a solo flamenco dance. Then-current jukebox favorites Jerry Murad's Harmonicats play "Fantasie Impromptu" and "The Galloping Comedians". Dancer Grace Romanos demonstrates "The Love Rumba", a roughhouse comedy routine with Paar on the receiving end of her sharp slaps and blows. A production number with eccentric dancers Buster West and Melissa Mason (from 1938's Radio City Revels) is followed by a closing song by the Sportsmen.

== Reception ==
"Vaudeville has slowly been returning to some theaters," reported Motion Picture Daily, "and now RKO in films has done something about its return in Footlight Varieties, a spirited revue that has entertainment for everyone, as well as good name value for the marquee." The Exhibitor also liked the film: "This entry should have at least one act to please every taste. Paar does a good job, and things move along at a good pace. The film stresses the value of movie entertainment throughout." Trade reviewer Pete Harrison submitted his opinion: "Some of the acts are pretty good, while others just about get by, but being a variety type of show it has something that should please the tastes of the different picture-goers." Film Bulletin was least impressed: "Presumably the basic idea behind his exhumation of the old vaudeville routines is that it offers the kind of fare now being thrown at the unfortunate owners of television sets. But why should moviegoers have to suffer, too?"

== Follow-ups ==
Footlight Varieties was followed by the fourth and final film in the "musical revue" series, Merry Mirthquakes, a 68-minute feature that received a limited release in 1953. Liberace appeared in new footage showcasing five piano performances, and he introduced three complete RKO comedy shorts: Groan and Grunt (1950) with Gil Lamb, Lord Epping Returns (1951) with Leon Errol, and Waiting for Baby (1950) with Robert Neil and Suzi Crandall as "The Newlyweds". What makes Merry Mirthquakes unique -- and what keeps it apart from the previous three variety features -- is that RKO allowed exhibitors to customize Merry Mirthquakes for their own local audiences. The three short subjects were not permanent parts of the program but only suggested, and theater managers could substitute other shorts available from RKO's local branch offices. RKO even announced the compilation not as a feature, but as part of its annual short-subjects program.

Columbia Pictures would follow RKO's example by packaging its own assortments of two-reel comedies, customizable for the exhibitor's convenience, under the titles Columbia Laff Hour (1956) and Three Stooges Fun-O-Rama (1959).
