= José Melis =

Cuban-American bandleader and television personality

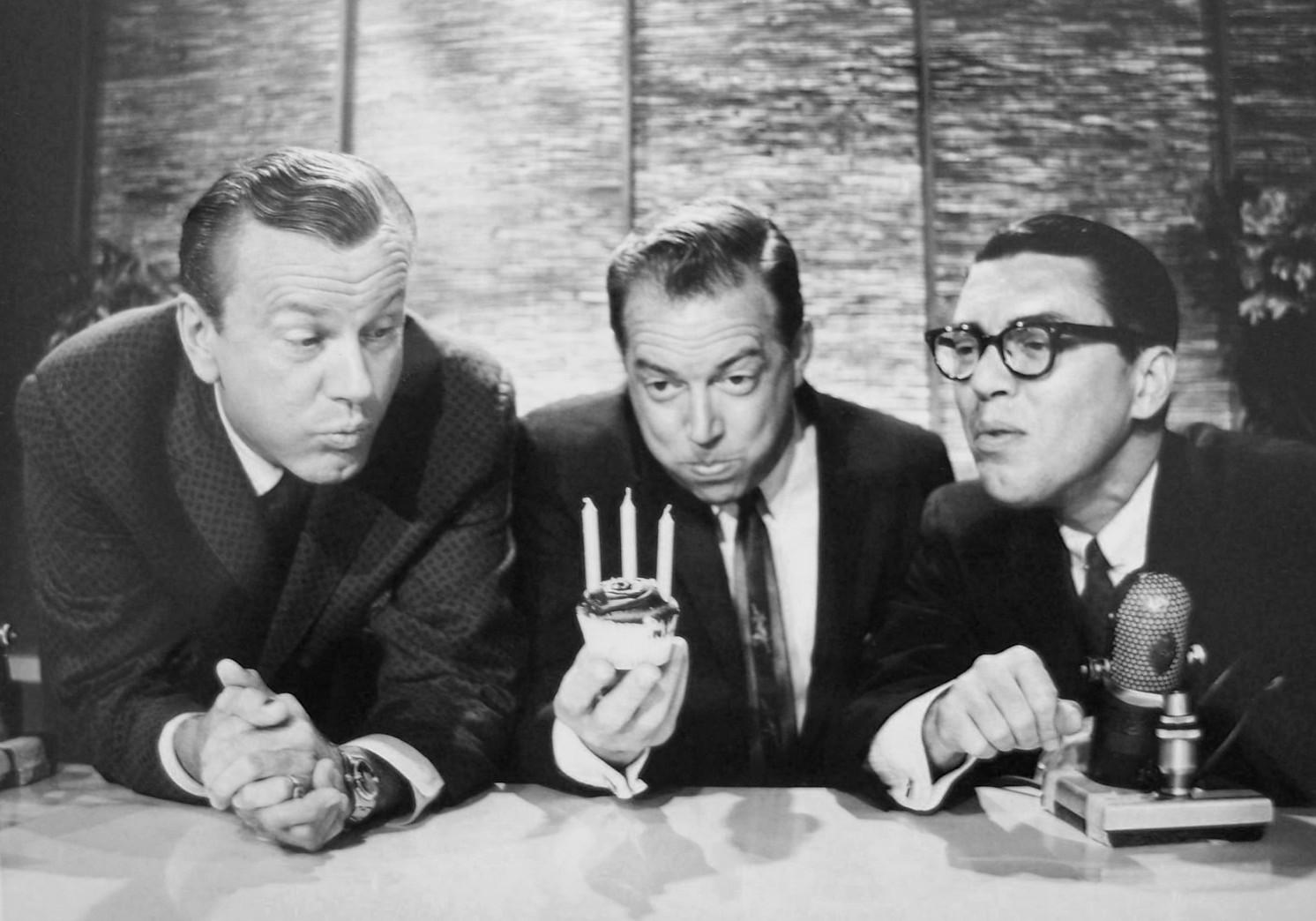
Melis, at far right, with the cast of The Jack Paar Show in 1960

José Melis Guiu (February 27, 1920 – April 7, 2005) was a Cuban-American bandleader and television personality.

== Biography ==
Melis was born in Havana, Cuba. He studied at the Havana Conservatory of Music and a Cuban government scholarship enabled him to continue his education in Paris. When he was 16, he arrived in the United States, graduated from the Juilliard School of Music and worked as a lounge pianist. During World War II, while he was serving as the musical director for the USO's New York City branch of the USO, he met Jack Paar, and the two remained friends for years.

In 1954–55, Melis was the pianist when The Morning Show on CBS was hosted by Paar. Then Paar moved from mornings to late night, and from 1957 to 1962, Melis served as the musical director of The Tonight Show during Jack Paar's tenure as host. He also wrote the music for Paar's theme song, "IM4U" (lyrics by Sev F. Marino), and he performed with Paar on other shows, including Parr's Startime (1960), and The Jack Paar Program. One of his routines on Paar's shows was the "telephone game," in which Melis would improvise a musical number based on the last four digits of an audience member's telephone number.

Melis also appeared on other TV shows, including Ed Sullivan's Toast of the Town, and he portrayed himself in the musical comedy film Senior Prom (1958). He occasionally accompanied Frank Sinatra, and his song "Pasion Orientale" was heard in the Judy Garland version of A Star Is Born (1954). In addition to touring with Mel Torme, he also appeared as a soloist with the Boston Pops and other symphony orchestras.

Melis was 85 when he died of a respiratory infection in Sun City, Arizona, on April 7, 2005.

== Listen to ==
- "Mas Feliz Navidad : Christmas with Melis". Archived from the original on 27 April 2007.

Media offices
Preceded by Skitch Henderson	The Tonight Show bandleader 1957–1962	Succeeded by Skitch Henderson
