= Bally Records =

American record label

Bally Recording Corporation, commonly known as Bally Records, was a record label based in Chicago, Illinois. It was a subsidiary of slot machine and pinball maker Bally Manufacturing. The parent company saw and filled a need to supply records to the juke box industry. The record division was launched in 1955 with much publicity, in such publications as Billboard Magazine, with Chicago entertainer, Lou Breese named as executive vice president. It was short lived and the last records were produced in 1957. As was usual at the time, records were issued in three speeds: 33 1/3, 45, and 78 rpm. Sparton Records of Canada released several Bally records in that country. The best known record issued on Bally is "I Dreamed" by Betty Johnson (Bally 1020), which peaked on the Billboard Hot 100 at No. 9 early in 1957.

== Artists ==
- Betty Johnson
- Bob Carroll
- Caesar Giovannini
- Claude Bolling
- David Bee & His Orchestra
- Ike Cole
- Ted Weems
- Thurl Ravenscroft
- Win Stracke
- Lou Breese
- The Highlights

== Sources ==
- Johnson, Betty, In Her Own Words, (2007) Bliss Tavern Productions, ISBN 978-1-931953-54-2
- Billboard Magazine, Dec. 17, 1955, p. 40
- Billboard Magazine, Oct. 14, 1957, p. 22
- Billboard Magazine, Nov. 26, 1955, p. 100

== See also ==
- List of record labels
