= Charles Randolph Grean =

American composer

Charles Randolph Grean (October 1, 1913 – December 20, 2003) was an American producer and composer.

== Biography ==
=== Professional life ===
Grean's first work was as a copyist in several big bands, including Glenn Miller, Artie Shaw, and Charlie Spivak. He worked at RCA Victor Records under Steve Sholes, producing country and Western recordings by such artists as Eddy Arnold, Pee Wee King, the Sons of the Pioneers, Texas Jim Robertson and Elton Britt.

He was the arranger for the Nat King Cole recording of "The Christmas Song." In 1950, he wrote "The Thing," a popular song which reached number one on the charts in a version sung by Phil Harris. The same year he became the head of A&R at RCA Victor Records, passing over his previous superior, Sholes.

In the early 1950s he formed a production company with Joseph Csida called Csida-Grean, a management company which had handled Arnold's career and produced his syndicated television show, Eddy Arnold Time.

One of Grean's compositions became a focus of litigation in 1958 in the case Dorchester Music v. National Broadcasting Company [171 F. Supp. 580 (S.D. Cal. 1959)]. Fred Spielman, who had composed the song "Rendezvous" in 1953, charged that Grean had plagiarized from his song in writing "I Dreamed," using the access he had as A&R director to the original manuscripts when "Rendezvous" was submitted to RCA for recording. (No charge was made with reference to the lyrics.) The court found in favor of the plaintiff on November 18, 1958.

Grean co-wrote the song "He'll Have to Stay" (answer to 1959's "He'll Have to Go") that went to #4 on the US pop chart by Jeanne Black in 1960.

In the late 60s, much of his success came from working with Leonard Nimoy, for whom he produced and wrote a great portion of Nimoy's music, such as "The Ballad of Bilbo Baggins", released as a single in July 1967. He also produced Betty Johnson's hits "I Dreamed" and "The Little Blue Man." He also produced The Mills Brothers' late 1960s album Fortuosity, which yielded the hit "Cab Driver". In 1969 he reached the charts as a performer, with his group, the Charles Randolph Grean Sounde, doing a version of Robert Cobert's "Quentin's Theme" from Dark Shadows. (Billboard #13 pop, #3 easy listening, Cash Box #8, #5 RPM) In 1973, his group was the stage band for Jack Paar's return to late-night television, Jack Paar Tonite, which aired as one of the rotating programs featured on ABC's Wide World of Entertainment on the ABC television network.

On December 20, 2003, he died from natural causes at age 90.

=== Personal life ===
Grean was married four times, once to Betty Johnson; although the marriage to Johnson was short-lived, the professional relationship continued and he produced a number of her recordings.
