= Jack Paar =

American writer and comedian (1918–2004)

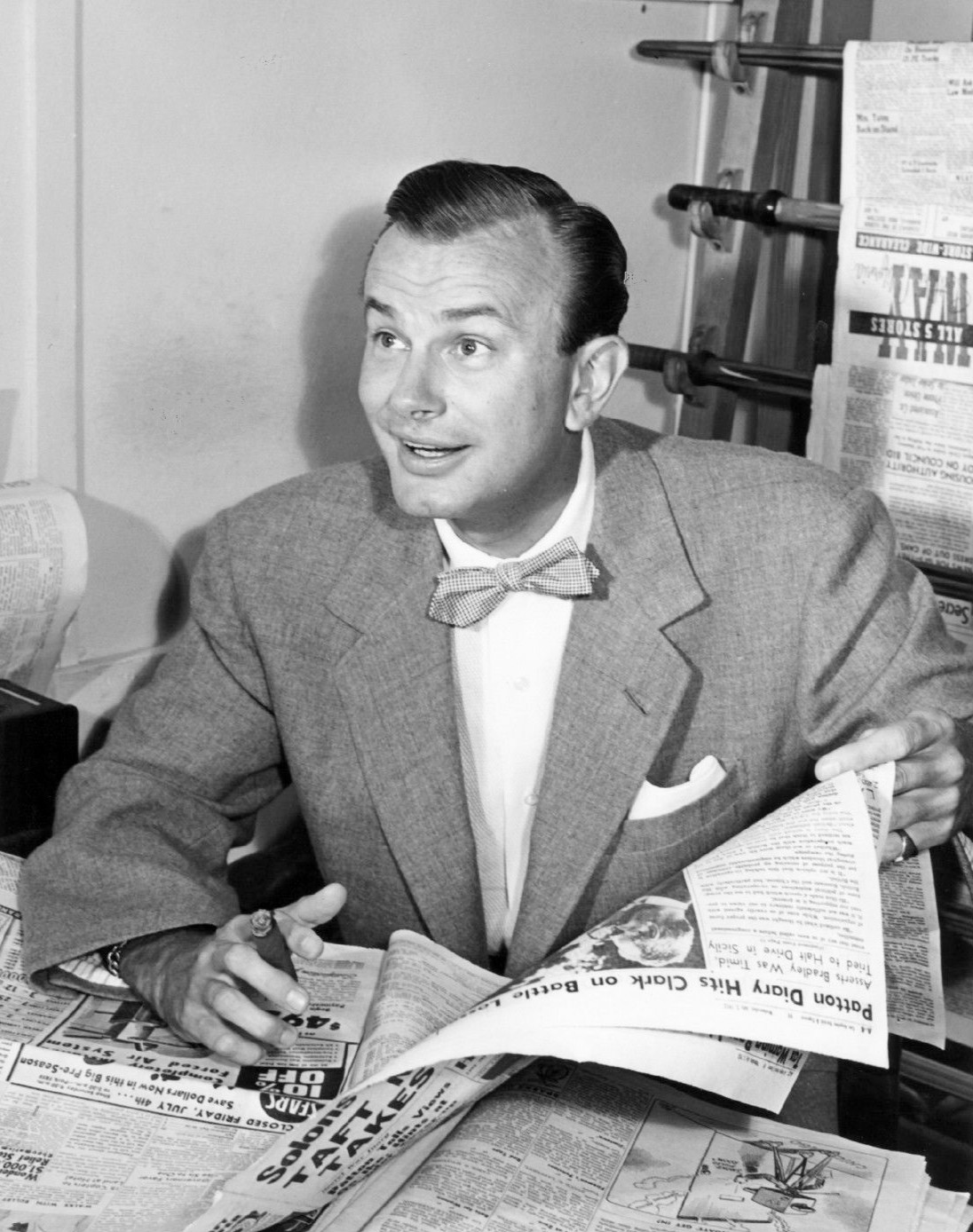
- Paar in the early 1950s
- Born: Jack Harold Paar; May 1, 1918; Canton, Ohio, U.S.
- Died: January 27, 2004 (aged 85); Greenwich, Connecticut, U.S.
- Notable work: Host of Tonight Starring Jack Paar (NBC)
- Spouse(s): Irene Gubbins (twice divorced) Miriam Wagner (m. 1943)
- Children: 1

Comedy career
- Years active: 1947–1998
- Medium: Television, film, memoirs
- Genre: Observational comedy
- Subjects: Everyday life, American culture

Jack Harold Paar (May 1, 1918 – January 27, 2004) was an American talk show host, writer, radio and television comedian, and film actor. He was the third host of The Tonight Show from 1957 to 1962. Time magazine's obituary of Paar reported wryly, "His fans would remember him as the fellow who split talk show history into two eras: Before Paar and Below Paar."

== Early life and education ==
Jack Harold Paar was born on May 1, 1918, in Canton, Ohio, the son of Lillian M. (née Hein) and Howard Paar. He moved with his family to Jackson, Michigan, about 40 miles (64 km) south of Lansing. As a child, he developed a stutter, which he learned to manage. He contracted tuberculosis when he was 14 and left school at 16.

== Career ==
=== Early career ===
After dropping out of Jackson High School, Paar worked as a broadcaster for WIBM, a local radio station. He went on to work as a humorous disc jockey at other Midwest stations, including WJR in Detroit, WIRE in Indianapolis, WGAR in Cleveland, and WBEN in Buffalo. In his book P.S. Jack Paar, he recalled doing utility duty at WGAR in 1938 when Orson Welles broadcast his famous simulated alien invasion, The War of the Worlds, over the CBS network and its WGAR affiliate. Attempting to calm possibly panicked listeners, Paar announced, "The world is not coming to an end. Trust me. When have I ever lied to you?"

In 1943, Paar was drafted into the U.S. Army during World War II, which interrupted his tenure as host of WBEN's morning show The Sun Greeter's Club. He was assigned to the Special Services in the South Pacific to entertain the troops. Paar was a clever, wisecracking master of ceremonies; he narrowly escaped being disciplined when he impersonated senior officers.

=== Radio and films ===
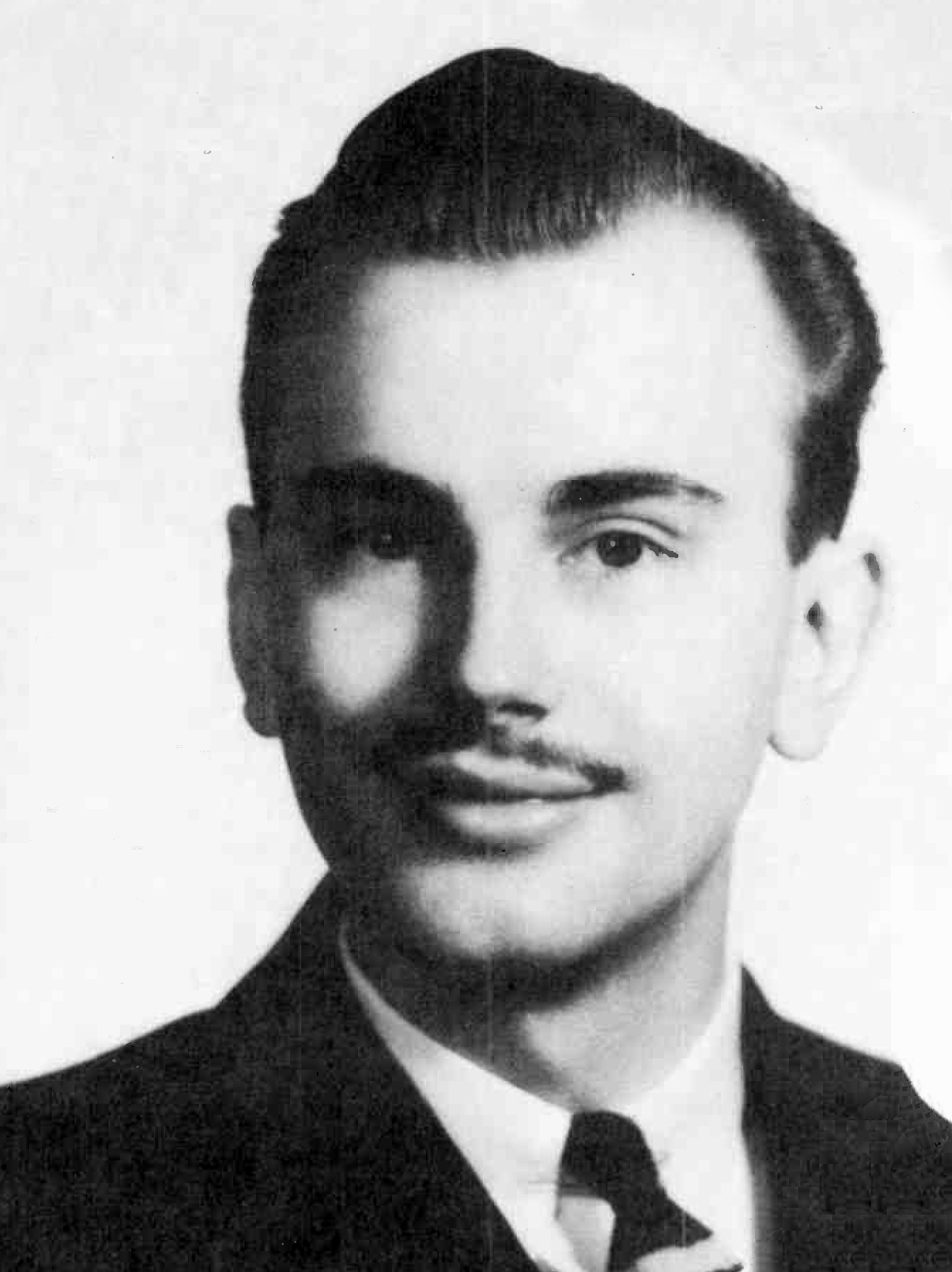
Paar in 1939, at approximately 21 years old

After World War II, Paar opted not to return to WBEN, instead seeking opportunities in network radio and film. He worked in radio as a fill-in on The Breakfast Club show and appeared as a host of Take It or Leave It, a show with a top prize of $64.

In 1947, Jack Benny, who was impressed by Paar's U.S.O. performances, suggested that Paar serve as his 1947 summer replacement. Paar was enough of a hit on Benny's show that Benny's sponsor, the American Tobacco Company, decided to keep him on the air, moving him to ABC for the fall season. Paar later refused American Tobacco's suggestion that he come up with a weekly running gag or gimmick, saying he "wanted to get away from that kind of old-hat comedy, the kind being practiced by Jack Benny and Fred Allen." The show was then terminated, earning Paar the enduring image of "a spoiled kid". A profile of Paar by the Museum of Broadcast Communications suggests that Paar later emulated Benny's mannerisms.

Paar signed as a contract player for Howard Hughes' RKO studio in the immediate postwar period, appearing as the emcee in Variety Time (1948), a low-budget compilation of vaudeville sketches. He later recalled that RKO producers had trouble figuring out what kind of screen characters he could play until one of the executives dubbed him, "Kay Kyser [bandleader who had made films for RKO], with warmth." Another compared his leading man appearance with Alan Ladd. Paar projected a pleasant personality on film, and RKO called him back to emcee another filmed vaudeville show, Footlight Varieties (1951). He also appeared in the 1950 film Walk Softly, Stranger, starring Joseph Cotten. In 1951, he played Marilyn Monroe's boyfriend in the 20th Century Fox film Love Nest.

Paar returned to radio in 1950, hosting The $64 Question for one season, then quitting in a wage dispute after the show's sponsor pulled out and NBC insisted everyone involved take a pay cut.

In 1956, he gave radio one more try, hosting a disc jockey effort on ABC called The Jack Paar Show. Paar once described that show as "so modest we did it from the basement rumpus room of our house in Bronxville."

=== Television ===
Paar got his first taste of television in the early 1950s, appearing as a comic on The Ed Sullivan Show, and hosting two game shows, Up to Paar (1952) and Bank on the Stars (1953), before hosting The Morning Show (1954) on CBS.

Paar had The Jack Paar Show on CBS, a Monday–Friday 1–1:30 p.m. Eastern Time program that ended in May 1956.

Paar guest-starred twice in 1958 on Polly Bergen's short-lived NBC comedy/variety show, The Polly Bergen Show.

==== The Tonight Show ====
With the success of Steve Allen as the first host of The Tonight Show, NBC offered Allen his own prime-time variety hour in June 1956. Over the next seven months, Allen's Tonight Show duties were limited to three nights per week, with Ernie Kovacs hosting on Mondays and Tuesdays. Allen's heavy workload forced him to leave The Tonight Show in January 1957 and concentrate on his prime-time show. For the next six months, NBC revamped the program as Tonight! America After Dark, inspired by the network's Today. The new late-night program, a magazine show with various hosts in different cities, proved to be a great failure. The network soon returned to its proven formula by reviving The Tonight Show and hiring Paar. With Paar as host, the show became a ratings success and generated annual advertising sales as high as $15 million (equivalent to $160 million in 2025). The show was initially titled Tonight Starring Jack Paar, and after 1959, it was officially known as The Jack Paar Show.

Paar often was unpredictable, emotional and principled. When network censors excised a joke about a "water closet" (toilet) from the show's February 10, 1960, broadcast tape before airtime without warning, Paar received national attention by walking off the program the following evening in protest, leaving announcer Hugh Downs to finish the show. Paar did not return until three weeks later after the network had apologized and permitted him to tell the joke. Paar found the everyday routine of planning a 105-minute program difficult to sustain for more than five years, and his weariness caused him to end his tenure as host. He later confided to fellow host Dick Cavett that leaving the program was the greatest mistake of his life. Paar's final show aired on March 29, 1962, during which he derided his enemies in the press, notably gossip columnists Walter Winchell and Dorothy Kilgallen.

Near the end of the run of the show, Abel Green of Variety called Paar "the most vivid personality in TV since Milton Berle became Mister Television" and wrote that Paar was the first popular entertainer since the creators of Amos 'n' Andy to change the habits of a nation, influencing sales of TV sets for the bedroom.

Robert F. Kennedy made a series of appearances on Parr's show in 1959 and 1960, during which he criticized Teamsters union president Jimmy Hoffa. Hoffa responded by suing the pair for libel, demanding $2.5 million. A district court declared the suit null and void.

==== Prime-time ====
Because NBC did not want to lose Paar to another network, it offered him a Friday prime-time hour with full control of content and format. He agreed, deciding on a variation of his late-night format and titling the show The Jack Paar Program. The show, which debuted in the fall of 1962, had a global perspective, debuting acts from around the world and showing films from exotic locations. Most of the films were of travels by guests such as Arthur Godfrey or by Paar himself, including visits with Albert Schweitzer at his compound in Gabon in Central Africa and Mary Martin at her ranch near Anápolis, Goiás, Brazil.

Paar showed film clips of the Beatles performing (November 15, 1963) three months before their famous live appearance on The Ed Sullivan Show (February 9, 1964). During the first half of 1964, a mock feud pitted Paar against his lead-in program, Englishman David Frost's news-satire series That Was the Week That Was.

Paar's prime-time show aired for three years and featured a wide variety of celebrity guests. The final segment of the series, broadcast on June 25, 1965, featured Paar sitting alone on a stool recounting a discussion that he had with his daughter about his departure, which ended with Paar summoning his dog from offstage as he left. In 1998, Garry Shandling featured the clip of Paar's farewell in the series finale of The Larry Sanders Show. He left the show in part so that he could have a larger role at a local television station he had purchased in 1963, WMTW in Poland Spring, Maine (an ABC affiliate), as his NBC contract prevented him from appearing on his own station; Paar would sell WMTW in 1967.

Paar continued to appear in occasional specials for NBC until 1970.

== Later years ==
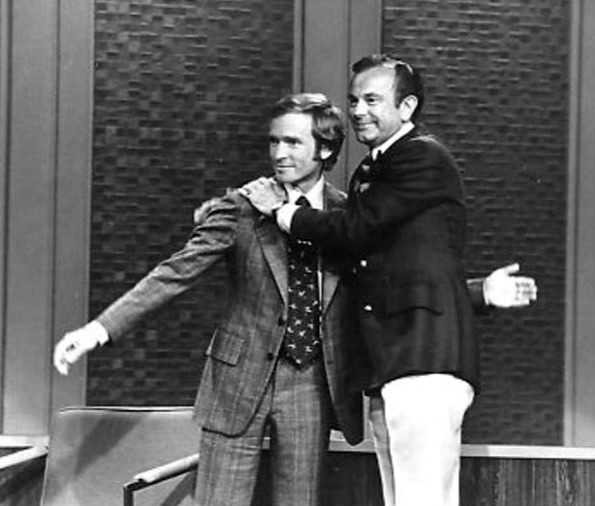
Paar appearing on Dick Cavett's show in January 1973, when he announced his return to television

In the late 1960s, Paar lived in Maine, where he owned and operated television station WMTW, an ABC network affiliate in Poland Spring, Maine.

Paar returned to television in January 1973 with a show titled Jack Paar Tonite, which aired one week per month as one of several rotating shows on ABC's Wide World of Entertainment. Paar said that he was unwilling to appear more frequently and that he would not have appeared at all unless ABC had committed to keeping Dick Cavett, one of his former writers, on the air. Paar's announcer for the program was comic actress Peggy Cass. The show featured the national television debuts of comics such as Freddie Prinze and Martin Mull. Paar stayed on the show, which was in direct competition with the Tonight Show, for one year before quitting, dissatisfied with the Wide World of Entertainment rotation scheme. Paar later expressed discomfort with developments in television media and once said that he had trouble interviewing people dressed in "overalls", a reference to young rock acts.

In the 1980s and 1990s, Paar made rare guest appearances on Donahue, The Tonight Show (hosted by Johnny Carson, then Jay Leno), and Late Night with David Letterman, as well as on Charles Grodin's CNBC talk show. He participated in the 1987 TV retrospective show This Is Your Life honoring Betty White.

=== Criticism of homosexuality ===
In his 1962 book My Saber Is Bent, Paar wrote in a chapter titled "Fairies and Communists": "There used to be a time when it looked like the Communists were taking over show business. Now it's fairies. They operate a lot alike, actually; both have a tendency to colonize. Just as there used to be no such thing as one Communist in a play or movie, now there is no such thing as one fairy. Where you find one, you usually find a baker's dozen swishing around. ... When I hear that some fairy is producing or directing or acting in a play, I can often name some of the rest of the cast, even if I've never heard it... The poor darlings, as they sometimes call themselves, are everywhere in show business. The theater is infested with them and it's beginning to show the effects. 'The New York theater is dying,' the late Ernie Kovacs complained recently, 'Killed by limp wrists.'" Paar also lamented the negative effects of gay men in the fashion industry: "I hope that all red-blooded men will rally to my crusade to have girls look like girls again. If we show our determination I'm sure that women will throw off the tyranny of fairy designers."

On February 11, 1960, during his address to the audience on the Tonight Show, Paar said, "I have turned down on this show so many people who are controversial or indelicate taste ... you can't sell product, you can't have people like you, and at the same time use them and bring on people with delicate problems, like, may I tell you, Christine Jorgensen has tried to get on this show ... no." In her book, "The Next Elvis - Searching for Stardom at Sun Records", author Barbara Barnes Sims recalls "late-night TV host Jack Paar was having a field day at her expense ..."

In March 1973 during the run of Jack Paar Tonite, Paar addressed his remarks and challenged representatives of a pro-homosexual organization to appear on the show to explain why he "and other entertainers should not call homosexuals 'fairies,' 'dykes', and 'fags'."

=== Retrospectives ===
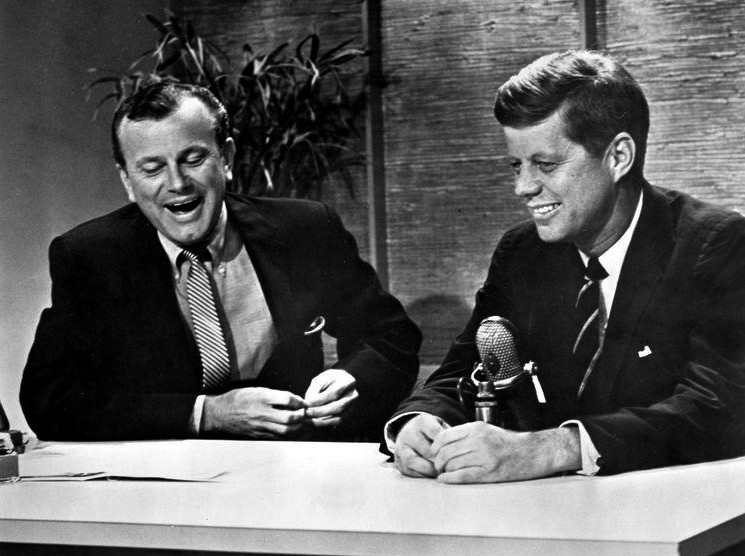
Paar (left) with Senator John F. Kennedy on The Tonight Show in 1959

In 1984, Paar emerged from retirement again for the Museum of Broadcasting's "Tribute to Jack Paar", making two live appearances in New York. This led to his 1986 NBC special Jack Paar Comes Home. The following year, a second special, Jack Paar Is Alive and Well, was broadcast by the network. Both were composed largely of black-and-white kinescope clips used at the tribute from The Tonight Show and from Paar's primetime program, for which he maintained the copyright. Although most of Paar's Tonight Show episodes were videotaped (in color beginning in 1960), only a few episodes and clips are known to exist.

In 1997, PBS television devoted an edition of the American Masters series to Paar's career, and in 2003 revisited the topic with another hour-long examination of his work titled Smart Television.

In 2004, a memorial for Paar was held at the Museum of Television and Radio in New York City featuring Dick Cavett, Turner Classic Movies (TCM) television host Robert Osborne and Paar's daughter Randy.

== Awards ==
Paar was nominated for an Emmy Award for Best Performance by a Continuing Character in a Musical or Variety Series in 1951 and nominated again in 1958 for an Emmy for Best Continuing Performance in a Series by a Comedian, Singer, Host, Dancer, M.C., Announcer, Narrator, or Panelist. He did not win either time.

== Personal life and death ==
Paar was married twice to his first wife, Irene Gubbins. After the first divorce, the couple remarried in 1940 in Ohio, only to divorce again. He then married his second wife, Miriam Wagner, in 1943, and they remained together until his death.

During the 1990s, Paar's health began to decline steadily. He underwent triple-bypass heart surgery in 1998 and suffered a stroke in 2003. On January 27, 2004, he died at his home in Greenwich, Connecticut, at age 85, with Miriam and their daughter Randy at his bedside. Paar's body was cremated and his ashes were returned to his family.

== Publications ==
- Paar, Jack (1960). I Kid You Not. Little, Brown.
- Paar, Jack (1961). My Saber Is Bent. Simon & Schuster.
- Paar, Jack (1965). 3 On a Toothbrush: Adventures and Encounters Around the Globe. Doubleday & Company.
- Paar, Jack (1983). P.S. Jack Paar. Doubleday. ISBN 978-0385187435.

Media offices
Preceded by Steve Allen	Host of The Tonight Show; July 29, 1957 – March 30, 1962	Succeeded by Johnny Carson
