= William O. Harbach =

American television producer, director and author (1919–2017)

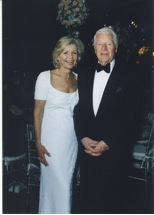
- Harbach and wife Barbara, Winter 1998 photograph by Lucian Capehart
- Born: William Otto Harbach; October 12, 1919; New York City, New York, U.S.
- Died: December 18, 2017 (aged 98); Fairfield, Connecticut, U.S.
- Education: Choate Rosemary Hall; Hun School of Princeton; Brown University; The Neighborhood Playhouse
- Occupations: Television Producer, Director, Author
- Known for: Producer of the original The Tonight Show; The Hollywood Palace and other award-winning series and specials
- Spouse(s): Laurie "Dougie" Douglas (1948-1951); Fay Caulkins Palmer (1954-1973); Barbara Schmid Vought (1981-2016; her death)

William Otto Harbach (October 12, 1919 – December 18, 2017) was an American television producer, director and author. He won four Emmy Awards and a Peabody Award Harbach also produced and directed special events, including eight ASCAP celebrations for renowned composers, lyricists and librettists. He was the son of American lyricist, librettist and ASCAP co-founder Otto Abels Harbach.

== Early life and education ==
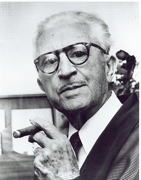
Otto Abels Harbach Father of William O. Harbach

Born on October 12, 1919, to Otto Abels Harbach and Ella Smith Dougal Harbach, William Otto Harbach began life in New York City. His brother Robert (Bob) was born in February, 1921. The family moved to Mamaroneck, New York, when he was six years old. His father was known as the "Dean of American Librettists," and penned tunes including Smoke Gets in Your Eyes.

Harbach attended the Horace Mann School's kindergarten and Pelham Day School. He spent five years at the Choate School (now Choate Rosemary Hall) where he met John F. Kennedy and Alan Jay Lerner. Harbach spent one year preparing for college at the Hun School of Princeton, after which he was accepted at Brown University. He spent one year at Brown before enlisting in the Coast Guard.

== Television career ==
After a brief stint managing the nightclub acts Kay Thompson and the Williams Brothers, Harbach got an entry-level job in 1948 as editor at the NBC New York Studio. Three years later he was offered the position of producer for a new local late-night show, the The Knickerbocker Beer Show. The show starred Steve Allen, who did not like the producer that had been assigned to the show. Harbach replaced him and the two became an award-winning team with the New York-based show being picked up by the full NBC network as Tonight Starring Steve Allen, the first iteration of The Tonight Show franchise. They followed their work on The Tonight Show with The Steve Allen Show, a variety series. During this time, he developed a partnership with Nick Vanoff, with whom he continued a personal and professional relationship and friendship until Vanoff's death in 1991. Harbach and Vanoff produced the acclaimed variety show The Hollywood Palace from 1964 to 1970, as well as multiple specials.

Harbach's other producing credits include:

- Milton Berle Special (1962) with Lena Horne, Jack Benny, Laurence Harvey, Charlton Heston, and Kirk Douglas
- Two Bing Crosby Special productions (produced and directed)
- Last Steve Allen Laugh-Back Series
- 1978 Multiple Sclerosis Telethon (Los Angeles)
- Bob Hope Two-Hour Special (for President Gerald Ford at the opening of the Presidential Library and Museum) in 1981
- Bob Hope's Pink Panther Thanksgiving Gala (1982)
- Shirley MacLaine Special Gypsy in My Soul (1976)

Working with Vanoff, Harbach also served as co-executive producer for:

- Bing Crosby and Carol Burnett: Together Again for the First Time (December, 1969)
- Two Herb Alpert and the Tijuana Brass Specials, including The Brass are Comin' (October 1969)
- John Wayne Special, Sing Out Sweet Land (1970)
- Bing Crosby and Bob Hope Special, Making Movies
- The Don Adams Special: Hooray for Hollywood (1970) with Don Rickles
- The Milton Berle Show
- The Don Knotts Show (1970–1971)

Harbach also served as co-producer with Vanoff on:

- The Big Show (1980) - first of a series
- Democratic Fund Raising Telethon
- The Julie Andrews Hour (1972–1973)

== Post-career ==
He staged and directed the Mary Martin Tribute at the Schubert Theater. He produced and directed the first New York International Festival of the Arts (an ASCAP show) in 1988 and, in the following year, The 75th Anniversary of ASCAP in Los Angeles. That same year he produced An Evening with Alan Jay Lerner at Lincoln Center for the Memorial Sloan Kettering Cancer Center, and produced and directed the Irving Berlin Tribute at the Music Box Theater on February 6, 1990.

On July 23, 2009, Harbach delivered a eulogy for his friend of half a century, Walter Cronkite.

Harbach died in December 2017 at the age of 98 following a brief illness.

== Awards and honors ==
- 1966 Emmy Award for Outstanding Variety Series - The Hollywood Palace
- 1967 Emmy Award for Outstanding Variety Series - The Hollywood Palace
- 1973 Emmy Award for Outstanding Variety Musical Series - The Julie Andrews Hour
- 1976 Emmy Award for Outstanding Special - Comedy-variety Or Music - Gypsy in My Soul
- 1979 Directors Guild of America (DGA) Award for Outstanding Directorial Achievement in Actuality - The Kennedy Center Honors: A Celebration of the Performing Arts (1978)
- 1980 Directors Guild of America (DGA) Award for Outstanding Directorial Achievement in Actuality - The Kennedy Center Honors: A Celebration of the Performing Arts (1979)
- 1976 Christopher Award - Gypsy in My Soul
- 1958 Peabody Award - The Steve Allen Show'
- 1958 Look Magazine TV Award for Best Novelty Series - The Steve Allen Show
- 1958 Look Magazine TV Award for Best Variety Series - The Steve Allen Show
- 1957 Look Magazine TV Award for Best Variety Series - The Steve Allen Show
- 1957 Sylvania TV Award for Outstanding Variety Series - The Steve Allen Show
