= The Fabulous McClevertys =

The Fabulous McClevertys were a calypso band from the US Virgin Islands that performed in the 1950s and 60s.

Saxophonist John McCleverty began performing in the United States in the late 1940s with guitarist Gustav Civil, pianist Cornelius Williams, and drummer David Heyliger, as Johnny McCleverty's Calypso Boys. They were a backup band for The Charmer, who later became known as Louis Farrakhan. In 1955, John's brother Carl "Mac" McCleverty joined the band on vocals to form The Fabulous McClevertys. Jean Bon Anno later joined as an additional vocalist in the 1960s.

The group performed in the United States, Canada, and Mexico, and in 1957, released an LP album, "Calypso," on Verve. They made many radio and television appearances, including The CBS Morning Show with Will Rogers Jr., The Mike Douglas Show, Tonight Starring Steve Allen, The Ernie Kovacs Show, and Name That Tune.

Newspapers sometimes commented on their exuberant dancing, for example, "The Fabulous McClevertys, a calypso troupe that makes scrambled eggs of Newton's laws of gravity" and "The management...has been obliged to reinforce its stage for the engagement of 'The Fabulous McClevertys'...The act is a kinetic one, and the bosses didn't want to take any chances on a splintered stage."

== Discography ==
- The Charmer with The Johnny McCleverty Calypso Boys, Is She Is, Or Is She Ain't / Back To Back, Belly To Belly, Rhythm Records, 1953.
- The Fabulous McClevertys. Calypso! Verve MGV-2034. 1957. Vinyl, LP, Album, Mono, 1957.
- The Fabulous McClevertys, The Big Bamboo/Pretty Little Maid, RITMO Records, 402, 196?.
