= Tonight Starring Ernie Kovacs =

- Genre: Late-night talk show
- Directed by: Barry Shear
- Starring: Ernie Kovacs
- Announcer: Bill Wendell
- Music by: LeRoy Holmes and His Orchestra
- Opening theme: "Oriental Blues"
- Country of origin: United States
- Original language: English

Production
- Producer: Ernie Kovacs
- Production locations: Studio 6B, NBC Studios, New York City
- Camera setup: Multi-camera
- Running time: 105 minutes
- Production company: NBC

Original release
- Network: NBC
- Release: October 1, 1956 – January 22, 1957

Related
- Tonight Starring Steve Allen; The Ernie Kovacs Show

Tonight Starring Ernie Kovacs was the Monday and Tuesday edition of NBC's late-night program Tonight hosted by comedian Ernie Kovacs from October 1, 1956, to January 22, 1957. Kovacs took over the two weekly broadcasts after Steve Allen reduced his Tonight schedule while also hosting the Sunday-night prime-time series The Steve Allen Show.

Although part of the same Tonight series hosted by Allen on the other three weeknights, Kovacs's Monday and Tuesday programs used his own production staff and regular performers. Bill Wendell served as announcer, LeRoy Holmes was musical director, and Barry Shear directed. Writers included Kovacs, Mike Marmer and Rex Lardner. Regular performers included Maureen Arthur, Peter Hanley and Barbra Loden.

== Background ==
NBC launched a prime-time variety series starring Allen in 1956. To reduce Allen's workload, guest hosts appeared on the Monday and Tuesday editions of Tonight before Kovacs became the regular host of those nights beginning October 1. The Television Academy lists both Allen and Kovacs as hosts of the 1954–1957 incarnation of Tonight, with Allen continuing on other nights while Kovacs appeared during the 1956–1957 season.

Kovacs had already hosted a succession of local and network television programs, including Three to Get Ready, Kovacs Unlimited and several versions of The Ernie Kovacs Show. His television work was noted for its unconventional use of the medium, including visual effects, camera tricks, blackouts, improvisation and comedy built around the mechanics of television itself.

== Production ==
Contemporary production listings described Kovacs as the permanent master of ceremonies of the Monday and Tuesday programs beginning October 1, 1956. The broadcasts aired from 11:30 p.m. to 1 a.m. Eastern Time and were packaged by NBC-TV in New York.

The initial production staff included Roger Gimbel as producer, Barry Shear as director and LeRoy Holmes as musical director. Kovacs, Mike Marmer and Rex Lardner were listed as writers, Andy McNey as talent coordinator and Bill Wendell as program announcer. Maureen Arthur and Peter Hanley were singers appearing in support of Kovacs.

The Paley Center holds a surviving excerpt from the December 11, 1956 broadcast. Its catalog credits Kovacs as producer, writer and performer, Shear as director, Marmer and Lardner as writers, Holmes with the music, and Wendell, Arthur, Hanley and Barbra Loden among the cast. Allen Funt was a guest on that broadcast.

== Format and style ==
Kovacs's editions of Tonight featured guests, musical performances and comedy sketches. His sketches included visual gags, unusual camera compositions and sequences with little or no dialogue.

One character developed during Kovacs's tenure on Tonight was Eugene, a mute, Chaplinesque figure used for pantomime comedy. The character subsequently became the focus of Kovacs's January 19, 1957 NBC special commonly known as the "Silent Show", which consisted largely of visual comedy accompanied by music and sound effects.

== End of run ==
Kovacs's final regular Monday–Tuesday broadcast aired on January 22, 1957, while Allen's tenure on the other editions of Tonight ended later that week. NBC subsequently replaced the Allen–Kovacs entertainment format with Tonight! America After Dark, a news and feature program hosted first by Jack Lescoulie and later by Al "Jazzbo" Collins.

Later in 1957, NBC replaced Tonight! America After Dark with Tonight Starring Jack Paar.
