= Reactions to the assassination of John F. Kennedy =

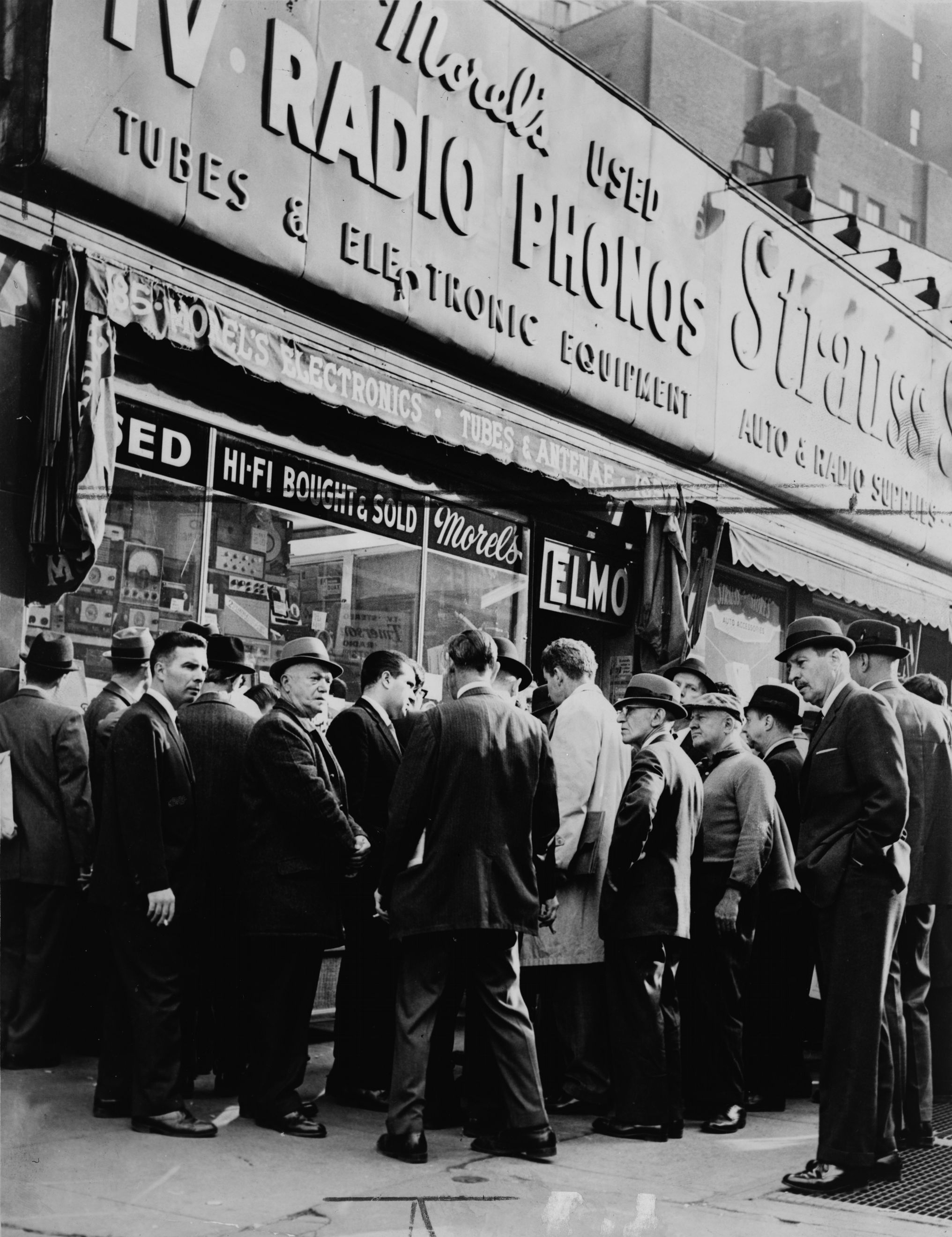
A crowd listens to news about the assassination of John F. Kennedy near a radio shop in Manhattan, New York City on November 22

Around the world, there were shocked reactions to the assassination of John F. Kennedy, the President of the United States, on Friday, November 22, 1963, in Dallas, Texas.

There was great confusion in the hour between Kennedy's shooting and the announcement of his death. Taking place during the Cold War, it was at first unclear whether the shooting might be part of a larger attack upon the U.S., and whether Vice-President Lyndon B. Johnson, who had been riding two cars behind in the motorcade, was safe.

The news shocked the nation. Many people wept openly. Crowds gathered in public places to watch the television coverage. Traffic in some areas came to a halt as the news spread from car to car, even gathering around cars to listen to radio reports. Schools across the U.S. dismissed their students early. Misplaced anger against Texas and Texans was reported by some individuals. Various Cleveland Browns fans, for example, carried signs at next Sunday's home game against the Dallas Cowboys, decrying the city of Dallas as having "killed the president." There were also instances of Kennedy's opponents cheering the assassination. A journalist reported rejoicing in the streets of Amarillo, with a woman crying out, "Hey, great, JFK's croaked!"

The event left a lasting impression on many worldwide. As with the preceding attack on Pearl Harbor of December 7, 1941, and the subsequent September 11 attacks, asking "Where were you when you heard about President Kennedy's assassination?" would become a common topic of discussion.

== Reaction ==
The initial CBS news bulletin of the shooting interrupting a live network program, As the World Turns, at 1:40 p.m. (EST) on November 22

In the United States, Kennedy's assassination dissolved differences among many people as they were brought together in one common theme: shock and sorrow after the assassination. It was seen in statements by the former presidents and members of Congress, etc. Barry Goldwater, the eventual Republican nominee in the 1964 presidential election, considered abandoning his planned campaign after the assassination because of his admiration for Kennedy. The news was so shocking and hit with such impact, according to the Nielsen Audimeter Service, within 40 minutes of the first reporting of the assassination, the television audience doubled, by early evening, 70% were at their television sets.

All three major U.S. television networks suspended their regular schedules and switched to all-news coverage from November 22 through November 26, 1963, being on the air for 4 days, making it the longest uninterrupted news event on American TV until 9/11.

CBS Washington correspondent Roger Mudd summed it up: "It was a death that touched everyone instantly and directly; rare was the person who did not cry that long weekend. In our home, as my wife (E.J.) watched the television, her tears caused our five-year-old son, Daniel, to go quietly and switch off what he thought was the cause of his mother's weeping."

=== Financial ===
The Dow Jones Industrial Average had been up 3.31 points (0.5%) for the day, at the moment shots were fired at Kennedy. Forty minutes later, as news of Kennedy's death was breaking, it had already plunged 21.16 points (-2.8%), on very heavy trading volume. With the stock exchange already running 20 minutes behind floor transactions, the Board of Governors of the New York Stock Exchange announced that they had closed orders for the day. AMEX and commodities exchanges quickly followed. The new president, Lyndon B. Johnson, telephoned NYSE President G. Keith Funston and commended him for closing the exchange upon hearing the news of the assassination. Funston told LBJ in the phone conversation: "Thanks, Mr. President. Nobody has complimented the stock exchange for anything in a long time."

The first trading day after the assassination, November 26, market averages rebounded sharply, recording the largest gains for any single day in history, and the fourth highest single day trading volume in NYSE history to that point.

=== Foreign ===
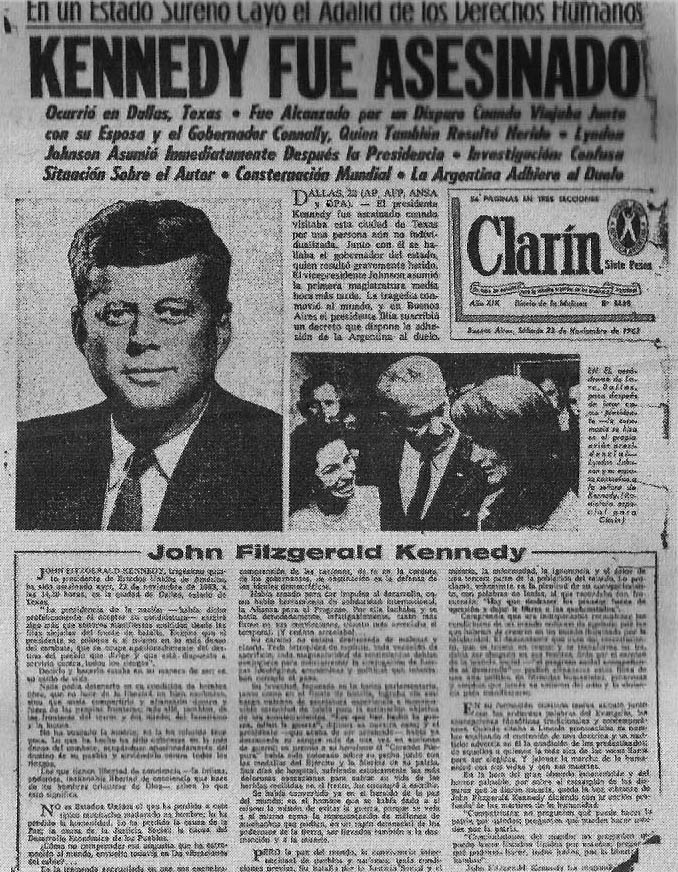
The assassination covered on Argentine newspaper Clarín.

After Kennedy's assassination, many world leaders expressed shock and sorrow, some going on television and radio to address their nations. In countries around the world, state premiers and governors and mayors also issued messages expressing shock over the assassination. Many of them wondered if Johnson would carry on many of Kennedy's policies. Johnson and the world would sympathize from the "concern etched on Mr. Johnson's face."

In many countries, radio and television networks, after breaking the news, either went off the air except for funeral music or broke schedules to carry uninterrupted news of the assassination, and if Kennedy had made a visit to that country, recalled that visit in detail. For example, in London, the BBC Television Service and the Independent Television Authority in London suspended their regular programs upon breaking the news. In several nations, monarchs ordered the royal family into days of mourning.

Fidel Castro announced Cuba mourned Kennedy. When the news that Kennedy had been shot reached Castro, he was being interviewed by the French journalist Jean Daniel. Daniel recalls that when Castro found out about the events in Dallas he said "this is bad news" because Kennedy was "a man you can talk with" and that "anyone else would be worse". Castro mobilized the armed forces of Cuba out of concern that he would be scapegoated as responsible for the assassination, which would serve as an excuse to invade Cuba.

An FBI memorandum written by J. Edgar Hoover in 1966 and declassified in 2017 suggests that the government of the Soviet Union was shocked by the assassination and blamed it on a right-wing conspiracy to overthrow the government, invade Cuba, and start World War III. The KGB began investigating the new President Johnson, who it believed was responsible for the assassination.

First Secretary Nikita Khrushchev and Chairman Leonid Brezhnev sent letters of condolence to Johnson stating, "The villainous assassination of Head of the American State John F. Kennedy is a grievous, indeed a very grievous loss for your country. I want to say frankly that the gravity of this loss is felt by the whole world, including ourselves, the Soviet people" and called the assassination "a heavy blow to all people who hold dear the cause of peace and Soviet-American cooperation."

At U.S. embassies and consulates around the world, switchboards lit up and were overloaded with phone calls (a mass call event). At many of them, shocked personnel let telephones go unanswered. They later opened up condolence books for people to sign. In Europe, the assassination tempered Cold War sentiment, as people on both sides expressed shock and sorrow. In Latin America, Brazilian president João Goulart decreed 3 days of mourning.

News of Kennedy's assassination reached Asia during the early morning hours of November 23, 1963, because of the time difference. In Japan, the news became the first television broadcast from the United States to Japan via the Relay 1 satellite, instead of a prerecorded message from Kennedy to the Japanese people. (Back in the U.S. where it was still November 22, the cancelled broadcast of Kennedy's message was shown on NBC-TV's Huntley-Brinkley Report).

=== Hostile ===
Hostile reactions to the late President Kennedy were registered from far-right elements and Black civil rights activist Malcolm X.

In the South, where Kennedy was not popular because of his position on civil rights, some isolated incidents occurred, where some expressed joy to the death of Kennedy: schools in Mississippi, Louisiana, Alabama and suburbs of Dallas itself.

President of the Memphis Citizens Council Richard Ely told the Nashville White Citizens Council that "I firmly believe Mr. Kennedy died a tyrant's death. He did not set back communism. He encouraged integration, which has the support of communism. He was a tyrant", causing half of the room, some of whom were Peabody College professors, to leave after they unsuccessfully demanded Ely to provide evidence for his claims. In Biloxi, Mississippi, student Thomas Hansen was thrown across a front glass door, after protesting against banners of celebration of the local section of the John Birch Society, before being hit with ultimately abandoned charges of vandalism.

As written by William Manchester in Death of a President:

An Oklahoma City physician beamed at a grief-stricken visitor and said, "Good, I hope they got Jackie." In a small Connecticut city a doctor called ecstatically across Main Street – to an internist who worshiped Kennedy – "The joy ride's over. This is one deal Papa Joe can't fix." A woman visiting Amarillo, the second most radical city in Texas, was lunching in the restaurant adjacent to her motel when a score of rejoicing students burst in from a high school directly across the street. "Hey, great, JFK's croaked!" one shouted with flagrant delight, and the woman, leaving as rapidly as she could, noticed that several diners were smiling back at the boy. In Dallas itself, a man whooped and tossed his expensive Stetson in the air, and it was in a wealthy Dallas suburb that the pupils of a fourth-grade class, told that the President of the United States had been murdered in their city, burst into spontaneous applause.

On December 1, after Malcolm X made a speech, reporters asked him for a comment about the assassination of President Kennedy. The spokesman for the Nation of Islam said that it was a case of "chickens coming home to roost", and added that "chickens coming home to roost never did make me sad; they've always made me glad."

The New York Times wrote, "in further criticism of Mr. Kennedy, the Muslim leader cited the murders of Patrice Lumumba, Congo leader, of Medgar Evers, civil rights leader, and of the Negro girls bombed earlier this year in a Birmingham church. These, he said, were instances of other 'chickens coming home to roost'." The newspaper noted that his comments were greeted by "loud applause and laughter" from the all-black audience. It quoted an unnamed audience member, who told a reporter he applauded Malcolm X's remarks "more for the fact that he had the nerve to say it than that I really approved of it".

Jimmy Hoffa, the President of the Teamsters union, who had been the subject of organized crime crackdowns by the Kennedy administration, was glad to receive the news of the President's death. He jumped up on the table and cheered when he learnt of his death. Hoffa was angered when he discovered that the Teamsters headquarters had been closed and flew into a rage when read a statement of condolences to be issued, ordering that there would not be one. On the day of the funeral most Teamsters branches were closed for business, but in Hoffa's base of Detroit the branches stayed open. Hoffa said of the President's brother and Attorney General that "Bobby Kennedy is just another lawyer now".

== Unofficial mourning ==
Hastily organized memorial services for Kennedy were held throughout the world, allowing many to express their grief. Governments ordered flags to half-staff and days of mourning. A day of national mourning and sorrow was declared in the U.S. for Monday, November 25, the day of the state funeral. Several other countries such as Ireland did the same. Throughout the United States, many states declared the day of the funeral a legal holiday.

Not all recreational and sporting events scheduled for November 22 and during the weekend after were canceled. Those that went on shared the sentiment NFL Commissioner Pete Rozelle expressed in deciding to play NFL games that weekend: "It has been traditional... to perform in times of great personal tragedy." After their win over the Philadelphia Eagles in Philadelphia, players for the Washington Redskins asked Coach Bill McPeak to send the game ball to the White House, thanking Rozelle for allowing the games to be played that weekend, saying that they were "playing... for President Kennedy and in his memory."

One notable sporting response came from Texas A&M University who traditionally burned a bonfire called the "Aggie Bonfire" (Texas A&M students are known as "Aggies") the day before a College football game against their rivals, the University of Texas at Austin (UT). The Bonfire is meant to represent Aggie students' "burning desire to beat the hell outta t.u.", a derogatory nickname for the University of Texas. The game and Bonfire took place around Thanksgiving every year and the 1963 game was due to take place on November 28 with the bonfire on November 27, just days after Kennedy's assassination. When Texas A&M heard that the President Kennedy was shot and killed, as a mark of respect, for the first time ever, they called off that year's Bonfire and dismantled the stack that was due to burn. One person involved Head Yell Leader Mike Marlowe said that "It is the most we have and the least we can give." The game went ahead and UT beat A&M 15-13. This was one of the two times ever that the Aggie Bonfire was called off before it was burned. The only other time was in 1999 when the Bonfire collapsed during construction and killed 12 people, a tragedy that led to the end of the Aggie Bonfire altogether.

== Mourning during the funeral ==
On the day of Kennedy's funeral, November 25, 1963, people around the world attended memorial services. This was a day of national mourning in the United States and in many countries around the world. Events were called off because of the mourning. Town streets were deserted while services were held. Everyone who could followed the proceedings on television. Others heeded the call for the day of national mourning by going to their place of worship for a memorial service.

Around the world, footage of the funeral procession was sent abroad via satellite. Many schools, offices, stores, and factories in the U.S. were closed. Those that were open scheduled a minute of silence. Others permitted employees time off to attend memorial services. During memorial services, church bells tolled. In some cities police officers attached black mourning bands to their badges.

In many states, governors declared the day of national mourning a legal holiday, allowing banks to close. There was silence across the United States at 12:00 EST (17:00 UTC) for five minutes to mark the start of the funeral.

=== Early example of breaking news ===
The somber mood across the U.S. during the weekend following Kennedy's death was evident on the broadcast airwaves. The assassination of President Kennedy was the longest uninterrupted news event in the history of American television until the September 11 attacks. By 3 p.m. (EST) on November 22, nearly every television station canceled their commercial schedules to stay with around-the-clock news coverage provided by the three U.S. television networks in 1963: ABC, CBS, and NBC. From 3 p.m. that day until November 26, all network entertainment and commercial programming ceased on U.S. television. This coverage was one of the earliest examples of what modern television viewers commonly known as a breaking news event.

Overnights included taped footage of earlier news mixed with a few breaking news items. On Sunday night, NBC broadcast continuous live coverage of mourners passing the flag-draped bier in the Capitol rotunda as an estimated 250,000 people filed by. On November 24, a concert performance of Gustav Mahler's Symphony No. 2, with Leonard Bernstein conducting, was telecast by CBS. Near the end of NBC's coverage of the assassination and funeral, which ended past 1:00 a.m. ET, November 26, the network broadcast a live special post-midnight concert by the National Symphony Orchestra, conducted by the director, Dr. Howard Mitchell, at Constitution Hall.

Many radio stations – even many Top 40 rock and roll outlets – also went commercial-free, with many non-network stations playing nothing but classical and/or easy listening instrumental selections interspersed with news bulletins. (It has been reported, though, that some stations, such as WAPE in Jacksonville, Florida, and other stations in parts of the country where Kennedy was unpopular carried on with their normal programming as usual.) Most stations did return to normal programming on the day after the funeral.

== Tributes ==
Tributes to Kennedy abounded in the months following his assassination, particularly in the world of recordings. Many individual radio stations released album compilations of their news coverage of the president's murder; ABC News released a two-LP set of its radio news coverage. Major record labels also released tribute albums; at one point there were at least six Kennedy tribute albums available for purchase in record stores, with the most popular being Dickie Goodman's John Fitzgerald Kennedy: The Presidential Years 1960–1963 (20th Century 3127), which climbed to number eight on the Billboard album chart and stood as the biggest-selling tribute album of all time until the double-CD tribute to Diana, Princess of Wales thirty-four years later.

Two days after the assassination, and one day before the funeral, a special live television program titled A Tribute to John F. Kennedy from the Arts was broadcast by ABC on network television. The program featured dramatic readings from such actors as Christopher Plummer, Sidney Blackmer, Florence Eldridge, Albert Finney, and Charlton Heston, as well as musical selections performed by such artists as Marian Anderson. Actor Fredric March, Eldridge's real-life husband, hosted the program. Plummer and Finney performed Hamlet's dying speech (I am dead, Horatio) with Finney taking the role of Horatio. The program has never been repeated, nor has it ever been released on video in any form.

Perhaps the most successful Kennedy tribute song released in the months after his assassination (although later hit songs such as "Abraham, Martin and John" and "We Didn't Start the Fire" also referenced the tragedy) was the controversial "In the Summer of His Years", introduced by British singer Millicent Martin on a special edition of the BBC-TV comedy series That Was the Week That Was, conceived as a somber and respectful tribute to Kennedy. Martin recorded the song soon afterward, and though it was not deemed suitable for single release in the UK, it was released in the U.S. and "Bubbled Under" the Billboard Hot 100 singles chart at No. 104. A cover version by Connie Francis climbed the Hot 100 chart to number 46 in early 1964 despite being banned by a number of major-market radio stations who felt that capitalizing on a national tragedy was in poor taste. Other versions of the song were recorded by Toni Arden, Kate Smith, Bobby Rydell, and gospel singer Mahalia Jackson.

Phil Spector's Christmas album, A Christmas Gift for You from Phil Spector, was pulled from store shelves at Spector's request, having sold terribly since the public was not in the mood for cheery holiday music; it was put back for sale for the 1964 season but did not chart until 1972.

The highly successful 1962 comedy album The First Family that parodied the Kennedys was quickly pulled from circulation which remained that way for many years.

Also in Britain, where the publishers of "In the Summer of His Years" refused to allow the song a single release by any British artist, Joe Meek, composer of The Tornado(e)s' hit "Telstar", released an instrumental titled "The Kennedy March" on Decca Records, with royalties marked to be sent to Jacqueline Kennedy for her to donate to charity. The Briarwood Singers "Bubbled Under" the Billboard singles chart in December 1963 with a recording of the traditional folk song "He Was a Friend of Mine", which was later recorded, with new lyrics written specially by Jim McGuinn, in 1965 by the popular American band, The Byrds, on their second album, Turn! Turn! Turn!.

In 1964, songwriter William Spivery penned "Mr. John," which became popular in the midwestern United States. Topical folksinger Phil Ochs paid tribute to Kennedy in his song, "That Was the President", written shortly after the assassination, and again two years later in his masterpiece "Crucifixion", connecting Kennedy and Christ.

== See also ==
- Assassination of John F. Kennedy in popular culture
- National unity government
- Breaking news
