= The Ernie Kovacs Show =

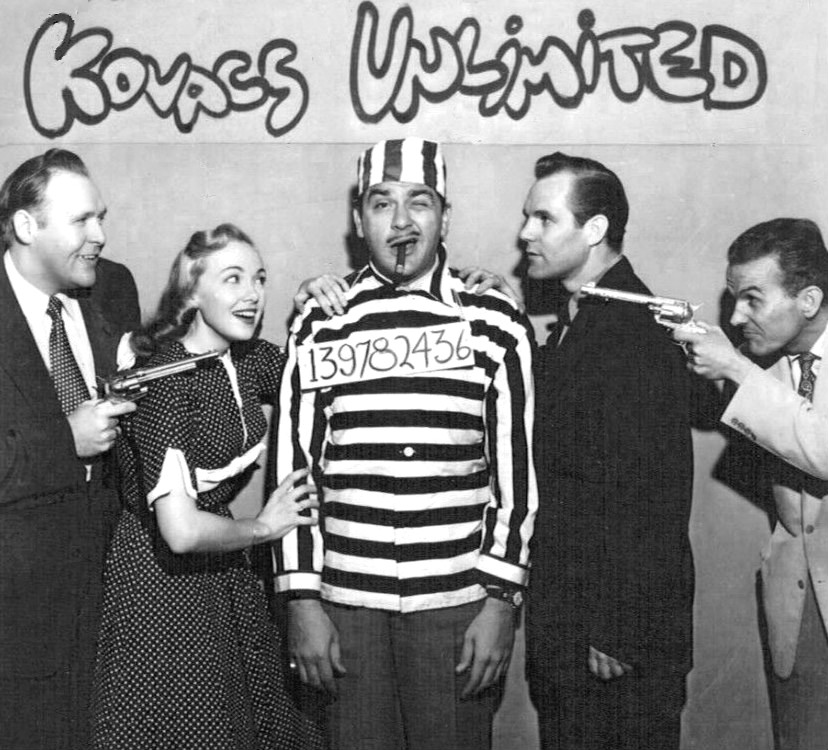
- The cast of Kovacs Unlimited in 1953. From left: Eddie Hatrak, Edie Adams, Ernie Kovacs, Trygve "Trigger" Lund and Andy McKay.
- Also known as: Kovacs Unlimited; The Ernie Kovacs Rehearsal
- Genre: Comedy
- Written by: Louis M. Heyward; Mike Marmer
- Directed by: Barry Shear (DuMont)
- Starring: Boris Karloff; Ernie Kovacs; Bill Wendell; Edie Adams; Jolene Brand
- Announcer: Bill Wendell
- Country of origin: United States
- Original language: English

Production
- Camera setup: Multi-camera
- Running time: 30 minutes/60 minutes

Original release
- Network: NBC
- Release: December 30, 1952 – April 1953
- Network: CBS
- Release: 1953 – 1954
- Network: DuMont
- Release: April 12, 1954 – April 7, 1955
- Network: ABC
- Release: 1961 – 1962

Related
- Tonight Starring Ernie Kovacs

The Ernie Kovacs Show is an American comedy show hosted by comedian Ernie Kovacs, first shown in Philadelphia during the early 1950s, then nationally. The show appeared in many versions and formats, including daytime, prime-time, late-night, talk show, comedy, and as a summer replacement series.

The Ernie Kovacs Show was one of only six TV shows broadcast on all four U.S. television networks during the Golden Age of Television, the others being The Original Amateur Hour, Pantomime Quiz, Down You Go, The Arthur Murray Party, and Tom Corbett, Space Cadet.

== CBS ==
From April 21, 1952, to January 15, 1954, Kovacs had a daytime show under the name Kovacs Unlimited airing Monday through Friday at 8:30 am ET on CBS Television. From December 30, 1952, to April 14, 1953, CBS aired the one-hour The Ernie Kovacs Show on Tuesday evenings at 8pm ET.

== DuMont ==
From April 12, 1954, to April 7, 1955, he also had a late night television talk show on the DuMont Television Network under the title The Ernie Kovacs Show, which aired from 11:15pm to 12:15am ET. Kovacs began to refer to this show as The Ernie Kovacs Rehearsal in its final months.

Of the DuMont-WABD version, three partial episodes and one complete episode are known to survive. The DuMont series, while also a talk show, included many comedy segments. For example, one episode featured a spoof commercial for a product called "Kodadent", a black toothpaste.

== Two NBC series ==
From July 2 to September 10, 1956, NBC ran The Ernie Kovacs Show as a summer replacement series for Caesar's Hour starring Sid Caesar.

Kovacs also served as host of Tonight Starring Ernie Kovacs on Mondays and Tuesdays, substituting for Steve Allen's Tonight Starring Steve Allen from September 1956 until Allen's departure from the show (and its subsequent reformat as a news program) in January 1957.

== ABC-TV specials ==
A series of eight monthly half-hour specials also titled The Ernie Kovacs Show aired Thursdays 10:30 to 11:00 pm ET on ABC from April 1961 to January 1962 with the exception of a two-month summer break in July and August. This latter series is often considered Kovacs' best television work. Shot on videotape using new editing and special effects techniques, it won an Emmy Award in 1961. Kovacs and co-director Joe Behar also won the Directors Guild of America award for a November 1961 installment, based on Kovacs' "Eugene" character.

The eighth and final ABC special, taped on December 3, 1961, aired on what was to have been Kovacs' 43rd birthday on January 23, 1962. The episode was restructured into a posthumous tribute to Kovacs, who had died ten days prior. Two of its features were encore presentations of the dawn-to-dusk urban street scene piece accompanied by Béla Bartók's Concerto for Orchestra and The Nairobi Trio performing to Robert Maxwell's "Solfeggio," the latter's insertion after the closing credits made possible because the sponsor Dutch Masters allowed the special to run commercial-free.

== Production notes ==
The original studio location was on the 4th floor of the WPTZ-TV (now KYW-TV) studio location at 1619 Walnut Street in Philadelphia. That studio was very small and accommodated approximately 45 audience members. The basement studio of the same building is where The Mike Douglas Show was shot from June 1965 until July 1972. This studio was converted for office use for an architectural firm in 2002.

At NBC, the show was broadcast from Studio 6-B at NBC Studios in Rockefeller Center. The studio was subsequently used for various versions of The Tonight Show.

== See also ==
- List of programs broadcast by the DuMont Television Network
- List of surviving DuMont Television Network broadcasts
- List of late-night American network TV programs
- Three to Get Ready (TV series), aired November 27, 1950, to March 28, 1952, Mondays to Fridays mornings on Philadelphia station WPTZ
- Ernie in Kovacsland aired July and August 1951 on NBC as summer replacement for Kukla, Fran and Ollie
- Take a Good Look game show aired October 22, 1959, to July 21, 1960, and October 27, 1960, to March 16, 1961, on Thursdays 10:30-11pm ET on ABC
- Silents Please March 23 to October 5, 1961 on Thursdays 10:30-11pm ET on ABC
