= Tonight Starring Steve Allen =

- Genre: Talk show
- Starring: Steve Allen
- Announcer: Gene Rayburn
- Music by: Skitch Henderson and the Tonight band
- Opening theme: "Mister Moon" (1953—1956), "This Could Be the Start of Something" (1956—1957)
- Composer: Steve Allen
- Country of origin: United States
- Original language: English

Production
- Production locations: Hudson Theatre, New York City
- Running time: 105 minutes

Original release
- Network: NBC
- Release: September 27, 1954 – January 25, 1957

Related
- Broadway Open House; The Knickerbocker Beer Show; Tonight Starring Ernie Kovacs; Tonight! America After Dark; The Steve Allen Show

Tonight Starring Steve Allen is an American television talk show broadcast by NBC. The show is the first installment of The Tonight Show. Hosted by Steve Allen, it aired from September 27, 1954 to January 25, 1957, and was replaced by Tonight Starring Jack Paar. Allen's run as host of the show lasted for two and a half seasons, beginning in fall 1954 and ending with Allen's departure in January 1957.

During its run it originated from the Hudson Theatre in New York City.

== History ==
Originally a local program airing from 11:20 p.m. to 12 midnight on WNBT New York as The Knickerbocker Beer Show, the program was moved to the full NBC network in the Fall of 1954. The first network episode of Tonight aired on September 27, 1954, and ran for 105 minutes instead of the 60-minute duration of modern talk shows (however, the first fifteen minutes was a local lead-in, a truncated version of The Knickerbocker Beer Show, shown in New York before the national broadcast began at 11:30 p.m.). The announcer of the show was Gene Rayburn (who would eventually become a top-game show emcee, best known for his 22 years at the helm of the Match Game) and the bandleader was Skitch Henderson. Allen's version of the show originated such talk show staples as an opening monologue, celebrity interviews, audience participation, and comedy bits in which cameras were taken outside the studio, as well as music; among the members of Allen's musical ensemble were Steve Lawrence and Eydie Gormé, who later became a married couple.

The success of the show led to a separate weekly prime time show hosted by Allen, which aired on Sunday nights. Allen gave up the Monday and Tuesday shows, with guest hosts taking over for the summer of 1956. Beginning that fall, Ernie Kovacs (who came over from the faltering DuMont Television Network) was the regular Monday and Tuesday host of Tonight Starring Ernie Kovacs for the 1956–1957 season with his own cast and regulars, including his own announcer (Bill Wendell; who would later work with David Letterman) and bandleader (LeRoy Holmes).

A kinescope of the very first episode survives and Allen's opening monologue has been rebroadcast many times on Tonight Show anniversary specials, and in documentaries such as Television. In his opening remarks, Allen makes the prescient statement that Tonight! "is going to go on forever" (an apparent reference to the show's run time, then clocking in at 105 minutes with commercials). With several hosts over the decades, it has done just that, albeit with a much different meaning than Allen intended.

== Allen and Kovacs' departure ==
Allen departed Tonight in January 1957, after NBC ordered Allen to concentrate all his efforts on his Sunday night variety program, hoping to combat CBS's The Ed Sullivan Show's dominance of the Sunday night ratings. Kovacs declined to take over the show full-time due to the amount of work that had been involved producing his version of Tonight twice a week, and so a radical format change was implemented.

After Allen's prime time show ended in 1960, he would intermittently return to the format he used on Tonight with syndicated programs bearing the name The Steve Allen Show, from 1962–1964, 1968–1969, and 1971. Allen would also return to occasionally guest host The Tonight Show during the Johnny Carson era of the show; Allen guest hosted 18 times between 1971 and 1982. He made his final Tonight Show appearance as a guest on the show's 40th anniversary broadcast in 1994.

== Tonight! America After Dark (1957) ==
Rather than continuing with the same format after Allen and Kovacs' departures from Tonight, NBC changed the show's format to a news and features show, similar to that of the network's popular morning program Today. The new show, renamed Tonight! America After Dark, was hosted first by Jack Lescoulie and then by Al "Jazzbo" Collins, with interviews conducted by Hy Gardner, and music provided by the Lou Stein Trio (later replaced by the Mort Lindsey Quartet, then the Johnny Guarnieri Quartet). This new version of the show was unsuccessful, resulting in a significant number of NBC affiliates dropping the show. The format returned to a comedy-oriented talk/variety program on July 29, 1957, with Jack Paar being brought in to host his own version of The Tonight Show.

== See also ==
- Late-night talk show
- The Steve Allen Show, Allen's Sunday night variety show he hosted while simultaneously hosting Tonight
