= LeRoy Holmes =

American musician (1913–1986)

- Born: Alvin LeRoy Holmes; September 22, 1913; Pittsburgh, Pennsylvania, U.S
- Died: July 27, 1986 (aged 72) Los Angeles, California, U.S.
- Occupations: Composer, conductor, songwriter
- Labels: MGM Records; United Artists

Alvin LeRoy Holmes (September 22, 1913 – July 27, 1986) was an American songwriter, composer, arranger, orchestra conductor, and record producer.

== Biography ==
Holmes graduated from Hollywood High School, studied music at Northwestern University in Evanston, Illinois and the Juilliard School in New York, before working with a number of bandleaders during the 1930s and early 1940s. These included Ernst Toch, Vincent Lopez, and Harry James, for whose band he wrote "The Mole".

After serving as a pilot and flying instructor, a lieutenant in the US Navy during the Second World War, he moved to Hollywood, where he was hired by MGM Music Studios as a house arranger and conductor. In 1950, he relocated to New York and continued as a record producer for MGM, and later moved to United Artists. During his time with MGM, he backed numerous vocalists, including Judy Garland, and in 1954 made what is possibly his best known recording, a version of the theme to the film The High and the Mighty. It sold over one million copies, and was awarded a gold disc. The song is known for its distinctive accompanying whistling, which was provided by Fred Lowery. Holmes provided the orchestration for Tommy Edwards epic 1958 hit "It's All In The Game", and tried rock and R&B with his backing to the Impalas "Sorry (I Ran All the Way Home)". Holmes also wrote the theme song to the television series International Detective.

Holmes composed and performed Ernie Kovacs' theme song for The Ernie Kovacs Show and led and provided the house band when Kovacs hosted the Tonight Show twice a week the 1956-1957 television season.

He moved to United Artists Records in the early 1960s, where he contributed to many compilations of movie themes, released albums under his own name and backed a succession of singers, notably Connie Francis, Gloria Lynne, Shirley Bassey and Puerto Rican singers like Tito Rodríguez and Chucho Avellanet. In addition, he produced albums for a number of United Artists acts, including the Briarwood Singers. He also worked on the music for the 1977 film The Chicken Chronicles.

Holmes died at Cedars-Sinai Medical Center in Los Angeles, California at the age of 72.
