= The Briarwood Singers =

The Briarwood Singers (aka The Briarwoods) were a 1960s folk band from Miami, Florida consisting of Stan Beach, Barry Monroe, Harry Scholes, Bob Hoffman and Dorinda Duncan. The band is now best known for performing as the opening act of The Beatles' February 12, 1964 concert at Carnegie Hall. In January 1964 the group released the album Well, Well, Well on United Artists Records, produced by LeRoy Holmes. The group also released a cover of the traditional folk song, "He Was a Friend of Mine" in December 1963. The "He Was a Friend of Mine" single was intended as a lament for the recently assassinated John F. Kennedy and peaked as #126 on the Billboard singles chart.

In July 1963, prior to becoming a recording act, the group began playing regularly at the Crossway Inn in Miami. The General Manager of the Crossway Inn, Ray Barbarino, had networking connections and expertise as an entertainment manager and promoter. Utilizing these connections, Barbarino brought his friend and colleague, LeRoy Holmes of United Artists Records, down from New York to listen to the band, successfully securing a recording contract for them with the label. During the mid-1960s, the Crossway Inn hosted appearances by many top celebrities and bands, including Peter, Paul and Mary, The Mamas & the Papas, Fats Domino, and Guy Lombardo & his Orchestra. Over the years, several local Miami talents have become national celebrities following appearances at the Crossway Inn, including The Miami Sound Machine (featuring singer Gloria Estefan) and the popular Latin singer, Willie Chirino. After signing with United Artists, the Briarwood Singers' recorded their one and only album, Well, Well, Well which was issued in late 1963. In early 1964, Barbarino arranged for the band to be the opening act for The Beatles while working with Jackie Gleason and the Miami Beach Convention Center management team.

In the early 1970s, Gabe Kaplan, who at that time was an unknown stand-up comedian, repeatedly pestered Barbarino for a job at the Crossway. As he had done with the Briarwood Singers, Barbarino set Kaplan up with his contacts in New York and within a year Kaplan had become a celebrity. It's possible that the character of Vinnie Barbarino from the U.S. sitcom, Welcome Back, Kotter, played by John Travolta, is a tribute of sorts to Ray Barbarino from Kaplan, who was the show's star.

Barry Monroe currently plays music professionally in Southern Colorado as Barry Monroe and Friends and with his group, Cheap Therapy. Stan Beach is a retired airline captain and lives in the mountains of western North Carolina in the town of Spruce Pine with his wife Marie. Stan continues to pursue his love of music as a solo singing act and as lead male vocalist and lead guitar player for the local group, Chalk Mountain Connection. The Briarwood Singers' only female member, Dorinda Duncan, went on to sign a solo recording contract with United Artists Records in early 1965, following the breakup of The Briarwood Singers. During 1965 she released the John D. Loudermilk-penned single, "They'll Love You", as well as an album of Bob Dylan covers titled The Songs of Bob Dylan Through the Heart of a Girl. Bob Hoffman became a journalist and author. He currently lives in St. Croix, US Virgin Islands, with his wife Lesley.
