= The Tonight Show =

American late-night talk show franchise (since 1954)

- The title card for The Tonight Show Starring Jimmy Fallon, the current incarnation of the show
- Genre: Talk; Variety show
- Created by: Steve Allen; William O. Harbach; Dwight Hemion; Sylvester L. Weaver Jr.
- Starring: Steve Allen; Ernie Kovacs; Jack Paar; Johnny Carson; Jay Leno; Conan O'Brien; Jimmy Fallon
- Country of origin: United States
- Original language: English
- No. of episodes: 569 (under Allen); 32 (under Kovacs); 1,066 (under Paar); 4,531 (under Carson); 3,775 (under Leno, first tenure); 146 (under O'Brien, 1 unaired); 835 (under Leno, second tenure, 4,610 total); 2,362 (under Fallon); Total: 13,359; (list of episodes)

Production
- Camera setup: Multi-camera
- Running time: Varies
- Production companies: NBC Productions (1954–1996); Tonight Show Company, LLC. (1962–1980); Carson Productions (1980–1992); Big Dog Productions (1992–2009, 2010–2014); NBC Studios (1996–2004); NBC Universal Television Studio (2004–2007); Universal Media Studios (2007–2011); Universal Television (since 2011); Conaco (2009–2010); Broadway Video (since 2014); Electric Hot Dog Productions (since 2021)

Original release
- Network: NBC
- Release: September 27, 1954 – present

Related
- The Tomorrow Show (1973–1981); Late Night (since 1982)

The Tonight Show is an American late-night talk show that has been broadcast on NBC since 1954. The program has been hosted by seven comedians: Steve Allen (1954–1957), Ernie Kovacs (1956–1957), Jack Paar (1957–1962), Johnny Carson (1962–1992), Jay Leno (1992–2009 and 2010–2014), Conan O'Brien (2009–2010) and Jimmy Fallon (since 2014).

Besides the main hosts, a number of regular "guest hosts" have been used, notably Ernie Kovacs, who hosted his own version of Tonight two nights per week during 1956–1957, and a number of guest hosts used by Carson, who curtailed his own hosting duties back to three nights per week by the 1980s. Among Carson's regular guest hosts were Joey Bishop, McLean Stevenson, David Letterman, David Brenner, Garry Shandling and Joan Rivers, with his final regular guest host being his eventual successor Jay Leno. The practice of hiring guest hosts has been mostly discontinued by Leno and his successors, who prefer airing reruns to showcasing potential rivals.

The Tonight Show is the world's longest-running talk show and the longest-running regularly scheduled entertainment program in the United States. It is the third-longest-running show on NBC, after the news-and-talk shows Today and Meet the Press. The current incarnation is taped from Studio 6B at NBC Studios in Rockefeller Center in New York, the same studio used during the later Jack Paar era and the first 10 years of Carson. During its initial run under Steve Allen, it originated from the Hudson Theatre on Broadway. From 1973 to 2009, and from 2010 to 2014 the show was taped at one of three different studios at NBC's Burbank, California Studios. During Conan O'Brien's brief tenure, the show was taped at an opulently reworked studio on Stage 1 of Universal Studios Hollywood.

Over the course of almost 70 years, The Tonight Show has undergone only minor title changes. It aired under the name Tonight for several of its early years, as well as Tonight Starring Jack Paar and The Jack Paar Show due to the runaway popularity of its host, eventually settling permanently on The Tonight Show after Carson began his tenure in 1962, albeit with the host's name always included in the title. Beginning with Carson's debut episode, network programmers, advertisers, and the show's announcers would refer to the show by including the name of the host: The Tonight Show Starring Johnny Carson, The Tonight Show with Jay Leno, The Tonight Show with Conan O'Brien and currently, The Tonight Show Starring Jimmy Fallon. In the 1950s and 1960s, TV listings publications such as TV Guide often listed the show as simply Jack Parr or Johnny Carson.

In 1957, the show briefly tried a more news-style format (during which time its title was adjusted to Tonight! America After Dark). It has otherwise adhered to the talk show format introduced by Allen and honed further by Paar.

Carson is the longest-serving host to date, although he is not the host with the most episodes. The Tonight Show Starring Johnny Carson aired for 30 seasons between October 1962 and May 1992. Leno has the record of having hosted the greatest number of total televised episodes. Leno's record is due to the fact that, unlike Carson (who only produced new shows three days a week, these being typically Wednesday, Thursday and Friday, starting in the 1980s), Leno also never used guest hosts on The Tonight Show with Jay Leno (except Katie Couric once) and produced new shows five days a week; Leno himself was also Carson's primary guest host for the last five years of Carson's tenure, adding even more episodes to his credit. Leaving out Leno's five years as permanent guest host, Leno hosted 119 more episodes as full-time host than Carson.

During Carson's first four years, the show ran for 105 minutes and then was reduced to ninety minutes in early 1967 when Carson stopped appearing for the first 15 minutes because most affiliates were carrying their local news during that time slot as they expanded to half an hour. During Carson's 1980 contract negotiations, the show was shortened to sixty minutes beginning that September, where it has remained since. NBC also broadcast The Best of Carson which were repeats of some of Carson's popular older albeit usually recent shows. Prior to the debut of Saturday Night Live in October 1975, NBC aired The Best of Carson on Saturday nights at 11:30 pm. During Leno's tenure as permanent guest host, The Best of Carson usually aired on Mondays with Leno hosting on Tuesdays.

Also featuring prominently on Carson's show was his sidekick Ed McMahon, who introduced Carson and typically appeared alongside him for the entire episode. By the end of Carson's tenure, McMahon usually only appeared in episodes hosted by Carson, and the use of a sidekick in such a manner has not been continued under Leno and his successors.

Apart from the show's brief run as a news show in 1957, its shortest-serving host was Conan O'Brien, who went on to continue hosting a late-night program following his controversial departure. O'Brien hosted 146 episodes over the course of fewer than eight months before Leno was brought back as host, where he served for almost four additional years. Host Fallon debuted on February 17, 2014. Fallon had previously hosted Late Night with Jimmy Fallon, and before Late Night he was a popular member of the cast of Saturday Night Live, co-hosting the "Weekend Update" segment with Tina Fey as well as performing sketches.

== Hosting history ==
From 1950 to 1951, NBC aired Broadway Open House, a nightly variety show hosted primarily by comic Jerry Lester. It was unsuccessful because hosting five nights a week burned through all of Lester's material faster than he could create it, so he was given rotating hosting duties for a weekly prime time variety show in 1951. The network scaled back late-night programming to shorter weekly shows. A spin-off, Dagmar's Canteen, aired the following season on Saturday nights; at some other point in the week, Mary Kay's Nightcap (which mostly consisted of previews of the next day's programming) also aired that season.

The format of The Tonight Show can be traced to a nightly 40-minute local program in New York, hosted by Allen and originally titled The Knickerbocker Beer Show (after the sponsor). It was quickly retitled The Steve Allen Show. This premiered in 1953 on WNBT-TV (now broadcasting as WNBC-TV), the local network affiliate station in New York City. Beginning in September 1954, it was renamed Tonight! and began its historic run on the full NBC network.

Host	Start date	End date	Duration	Episodes
Steve Allen	September 27, 1954	January 25, 1957	2 years, 59 days	569
Ernie Kovacs	October 1, 1956	January 22, 1957	113 days	32
Jack Lescoulie	January 28, 1957	June 21, 1957	144 days	104
Al "Jazzbo" Collins	June 24, 1957	July 26, 1957	32 days	25
Jack Paar	July 29, 1957	March 30, 1962	4 years, 244 days	1,066
Various hosts (Note: Guest hosts between the end of Jack Paar's tenure and the beginning of Carson's included: Art Linkletter (4 weeks), Joey Bishop (2 weeks), Bob Cummings, Merv Griffin (4 weeks), Jack Carter, Jan Murray, Peter Lind Hayes and Mary Healy, Soupy Sales, Mort Sahl, Steve Lawrence, Jerry Lewis (2 weeks), Jimmy Dean, Arlene Francis, Jack E. Leonard, Hugh Downs, Groucho Marx, Hal March and Donald O'Connor. The announcer for the show was Hugh Downs, carrying over from Paar's tenure.)	April 2, 1962	September 28, 1962	179 days	148
Johnny Carson	October 1, 1962	May 22, 1992	29 years, 234 days	4,531 (Note: Not including guest hosted or Weekend Tonight Show/Best of Carson episodes)
Jay Leno (first tenure)	May 25, 1992	May 29, 2009	17 years, 4 days	3,775
Conan O'Brien	June 1, 2009	January 22, 2010	235 days	146
Jay Leno (second tenure)	March 1, 2010	February 6, 2014	3 years, 342 days	835
Jimmy Fallon	February 17, 2014	present	12 years, 256 days	2,362

Notes for hosting history

=== Steve Allen (1954–1957) and Ernie Kovacs (1956–1957) ===
The first Tonight announcer was Gene Rayburn. Allen's version of the show originated talk show staples such as an opening monologue, celebrity interviews, audience participation, and comedy bits in which cameras were taken outside the studio, as well as music including guest performers, a house vocal group (duo Steve and Eydie, who would marry each other in 1957) and a house band under Lyle "Skitch" Henderson.

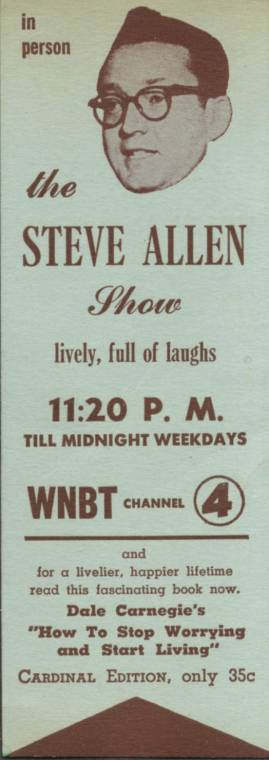
Bookmark promotion for Allen's late-night show

When the show became a success, Allen got a primetime Sunday comedy/variety show in June 1956, leading him to share Tonight hosting duties with Ernie Kovacs during the 1956–57 season. To give Allen time to work on his Sunday evening show, Kovacs hosted Ernie Kovacs Tonight on Monday and Tuesday nights with his own announcer (Bill Wendell) and bandleader (LeRoy Holmes).

During the later Steve Allen years, regular audience member Lillian Miller (usually referred to as "Miss Miller") became such an integral part that she was forced to join American Federation of Television and Radio Artists, the television/radio performers union. She would continue to perform the same service for most of the major talk shows for decades, including those hosted by Paar, Carson, Merv Griffin (until 1986), and Mike Douglas, among others.

Allen and Kovacs departed Tonight in January 1957 after NBC ordered Allen to concentrate all his efforts on his Sunday-night variety program, hoping to combat the dominance of the Sunday night ratings first by CBS's The Ed Sullivan Show then by ABC's Maverick.

Unlike the first installment of Johnny Carson's tenure, which is lost except for audio recordings, a kinescope recording of most of the first Tonight Show under Allen survives. In this recording, Allen states during his opening monologue that "this show is going to go on forever"; although in context (and as part of a series of jokes) Allen refers to the fact the program is scheduled to run late into the night, his statement has come to refer to the longevity of the franchise.

=== Tonight! America After Dark (1957) ===
Rather than continuing with the same format after Allen and Kovacs's departure from Tonight, NBC changed the show's format to a news and features show, similar to that of the network's popular morning program Today. The new show, renamed Tonight! America After Dark, was broadcast by NBC from January 28 to July 26, 1957.

The program departed from the comedy and variety format used by Steve Allen. Instead, it used a late-night magazine format, with interviews, news features, entertainment reports and remote segments from around the United States. Jack Lescoulie was the original host, and was later replaced by radio personality Al "Jazzbo" Collins. Contributors included newspaper columnists and commentators Hy Gardner, Bob Considine, Earl Wilson, Irv Kupcinet and Paul Coates. Music was provided by the Lou Stein Trio (later replaced by the Mort Lindsey Quartet, then the Johnny Guarnieri Quartet).

The show was poorly received and struggled with ratings, sponsorship and affiliate clearance. A later Time profile of Jack Paar quoted NBC chairman Robert Sarnoff as saying that the America After Dark version of Tonight had become "a shambles", with sponsors avoiding the program and some stations leaving NBC's late-night lineup for old movies.

NBC ended the format on July 26, 1957, and three days later relaunched the late-night program as Tonight Starring Jack Paar. Under Paar, the program returned to a comedy, interview and variety format closer to Allen's original Tonight.

=== Jack Paar (1957–1962) ===
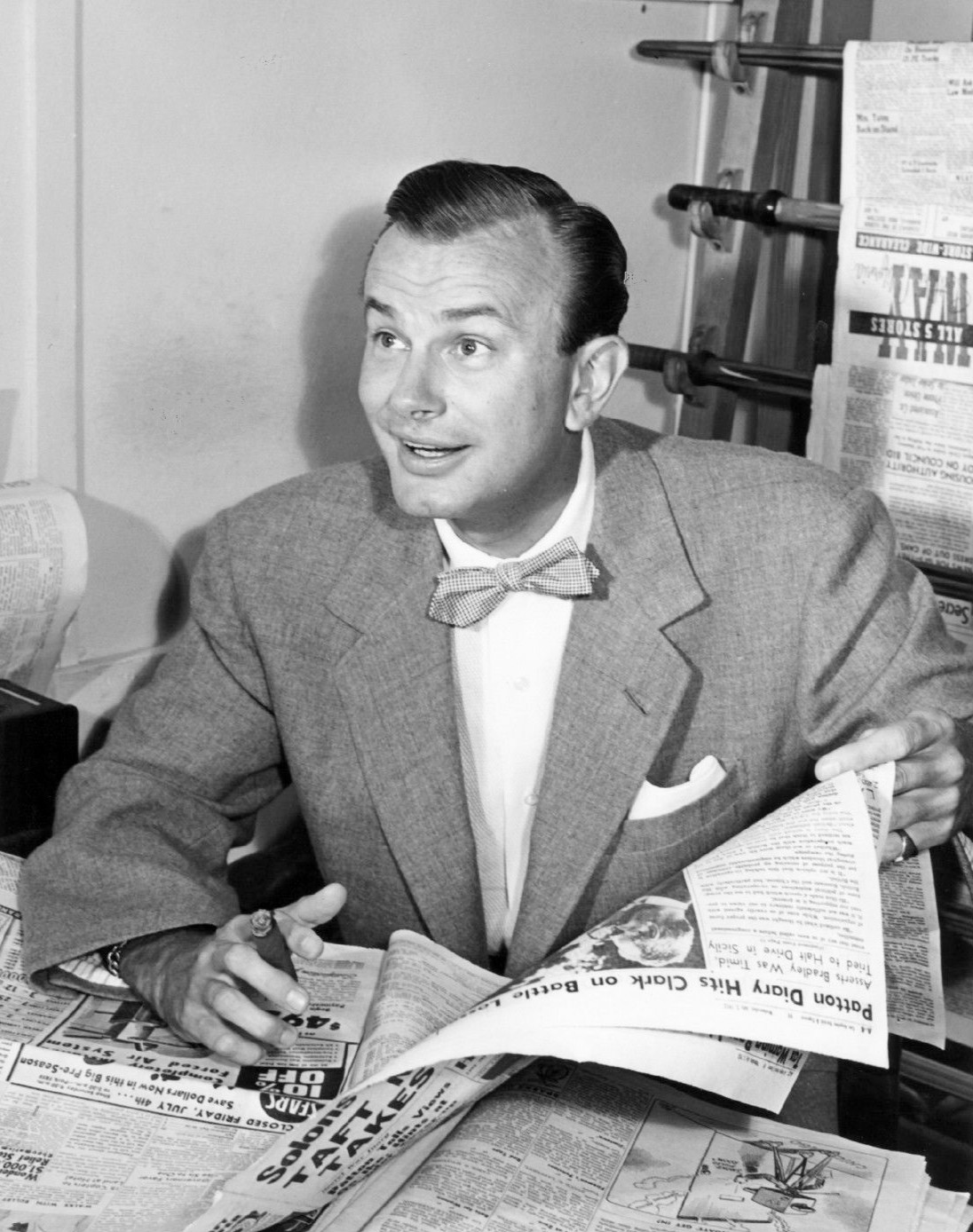
Jack Paar, 1950s

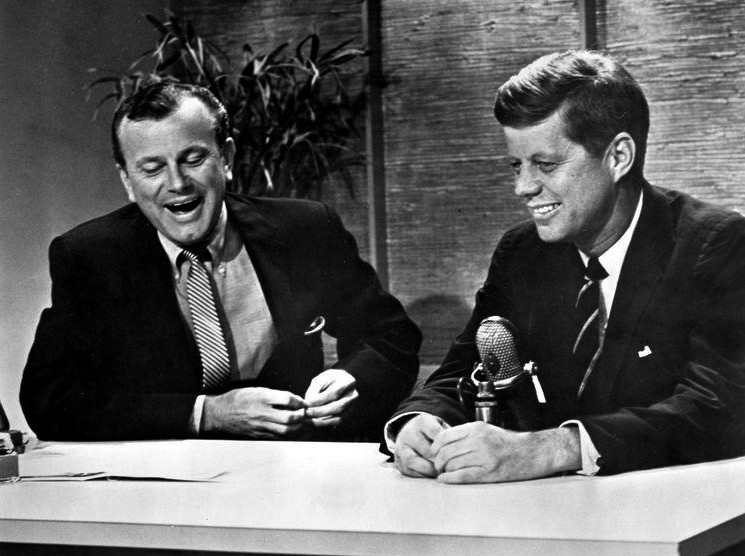
Jack Paar and U.S. Senator John F. Kennedy (D–Massachusetts) in 1959, prior to the 1960 presidential election.

In July 1957, NBC returned the program to a talk/variety show format once again, with Jack Paar (who left his role as morning show host on CBS to join NBC) becoming the new solo host of the show. Under Paar, most of the NBC affiliates that had dropped the show during the ill-fated run of Tonight! America After Dark began airing the show once again. Paar's era began the practice of branding the series after the host, and as such the program, though officially still called Tonight, was also marketed as The Jack Paar Show. A combo band conducted by Paar's Army buddy pianist Jose Melis filled commercial breaks and backed musical entertainers. Paar also introduced the idea of having guest hosts; one of these early hosts was Johnny Carson. It was also one of the first regularly scheduled network shows to be telecast in color beginning sporadically in September 1957, with regular color broadcasts beginning in September 1960.

On February 11, 1960, Jack Paar unexpectedly walked off the show in the midst of the program – an absence that lasted almost a month – after NBC censors edited out a segment taped the night before about a joke involving a "WC" ("water closet", a polite term for a flush toilet) being confused for a "wayside chapel". As he left his desk, he said, "I am leaving The Tonight Show. There must be a better way of making a living than this". Paar's abrupt departure left his startled announcer, Hugh Downs, to finish the late-night broadcast himself.

An English lady is visiting Switzerland. She asks about the location of the "W.C." The Swiss, thinking she is referring to the Wayside Chapel, leaves her a note that said (in part) "the W.C. is situated nine miles from the room that you will occupy. It is capable of holding about 229 people and it is only open on Sunday and Thursday. It may interest you to know that my daughter was married in the W.C. and it was there that she met her husband. I shall be delighted to reserve the best seat for you, if you wish, where you will be seen by everyone'.

— Censored joke dropped from February 11, 1960, show

Paar returned to the show on March 7, 1960, strolled on stage after the opening credits, struck a pose, and said, "As I was saying before I was interrupted..." After the audience erupted in applause, Paar continued: "when I walked off, I said there must be a better way of making a living. Well, I've looked—and there isn't!" However, citing that he would prefer to do one prime-time show per week rather than five late-night installments, Paar eventually left the show two years later in March 1962, at the pinnacle of his success as host. The guests on the last show were Jack E. Leonard, Alexander King, Robert Merrill and Buddy Hackett. Among those appearing in taped farewell messages were Richard Nixon, Robert F. Kennedy, Billy Graham, Bob Hope and Jack Benny. Downs was the announcer, and Melis led the band. The Jack Paar Show was moved to the evening's prime time (as The Jack Paar Program) and aired weekly on Friday nights through the 1965 season. In September 2025, Jimmy Kimmel used the same line to open his first monologue after the suspension of his show.

=== Transition from Paar to Carson (1962) ===
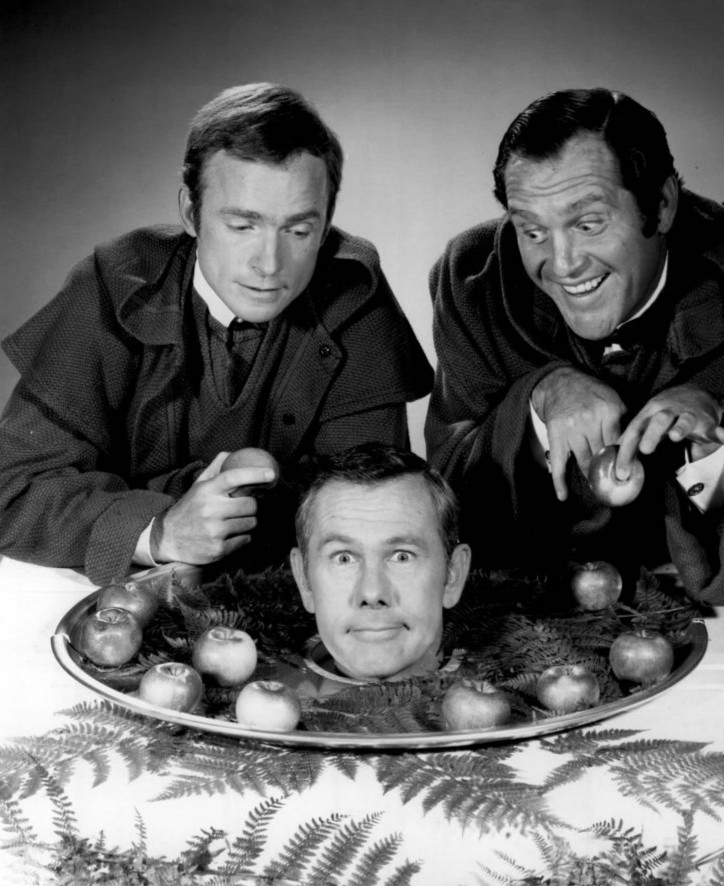
Dick Cavett, Alan King and Johnny Carson

Johnny Carson was chosen as Paar's successor when Paar chose to leave The Tonight Show for a prime time show. Carson was host at the time of the weekday afternoon quiz show Who Do You Trust? on the newest and then lowest-rated radio and television network, the American Broadcasting Company (ABC, as the Blue Network, had been separated from NBC in 1943 owing to government pressure). Because Carson was under contract through September to ABC and producer Don Fedderson (who held him to his contract until the day it expired), he could not take over as host until October 1, 1962. The months between Paar and Carson were filled by a series of guest hosts including Art Linkletter (4 weeks), Joey Bishop (2 weeks), Bob Cummings, Merv Griffin (4 weeks), Jack Carter, Jan Murray, Peter Lind Hayes and Mary Healy, Soupy Sales, Mort Sahl, Steve Lawrence, Jerry Lewis (2 weeks), Jimmy Dean, Arlene Francis, Jack E. Leonard, Hugh Downs, Groucho Marx, Hal March and Donald O'Connor, many of whom later noted they were being led to believe they were auditioning for the job; Francis was among the first women to ever host a late-night talk show. Griffin was so well received as a guest host that NBC gave him his own daytime talk show, the first of three he would host in his broadcasting career, which debuted the same day Carson took over the late-night show, and Lewis's two-week stint was so successful that NBC seriously considered retracting their offer to Carson. Lewis subsequently wound up hosting a lavish 2-hour prime time talk show for ABC entitled The Jerry Lewis Show, which was famously unsuccessful, and continued his more successful movie career. ABC also picked up Dean as a variety show host, airing The Jimmy Dean Show for three years from 1963 to 1966.

The show was broadcast under the title The Tonight Show during this interregnum, with Skitch Henderson returning as bandleader. Hugh Downs remained as announcer/sidekick until taking over hosting duties on Today in September, at which point he was replaced by Ed Herlihy.

=== Johnny Carson (1962–1992) ===
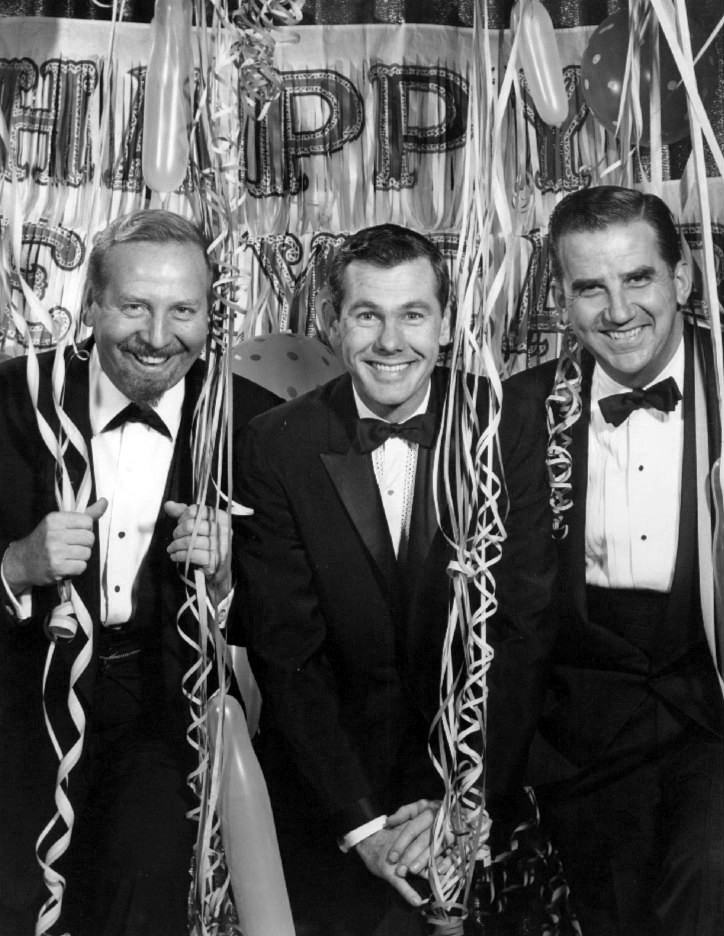
New Year's Eve 1962, with (L-R) Skitch Henderson, Johnny Carson and Ed McMahon.

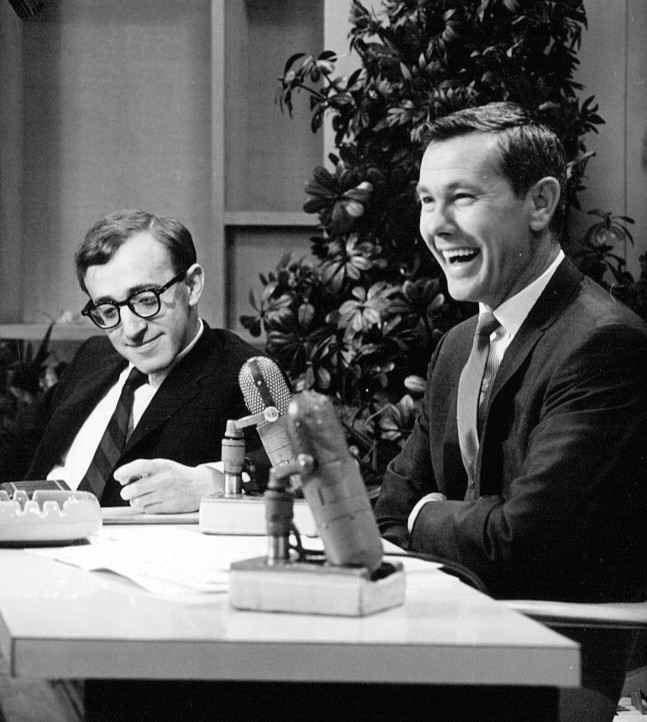
Woody Allen and Carson, 1964

Groucho Marx introduced Carson as the new host on October 1, 1962. Ed McMahon was Carson's announcer and on-screen sidekick, the same role he'd filled on Who Do You Trust? McMahon also introduced Carson with the drawn out catchphrase "Heeeeeeeeeeeeeere's Johnny!" The Tonight Show orchestra was, for Carson's first four years, still led by Skitch Henderson. After a brief stint by Milton Delugg, beginning in 1967 the "NBC Orchestra" was then headed by trumpeter Doc Severinsen who had played in the band during the Henderson era. [See "Music and Announcers" below.] For all but a few months of its first decade on the air, Carson's Tonight Show was based in New York City. In 1972, the show moved to Burbank, California into Studio One of NBC Studios West Coast (although it was announced as coming from nearby Hollywood) for the remainder of his tenure.

Carson lacked the mercurial, electric personality of Paar, and his version of The Tonight Show never riveted the country's attention the way that Paar's had, but his more predictable approach eventually became part of the cultural landscape by virtue of the fact that the viewership, in a basically three-network paradigm, was infinitely more monolithic than it later became. Examples include when he played the game Twister with Eva Gabor in 1966, which increased the sales of the relatively unknown game. In December 1973, when Carson joked about an alleged shortage of toilet paper, panic buying and hoarding ensued across the United States as consumers emptied stores, causing a real shortage that lasted for weeks. Stores and toilet paper manufacturers had to ration supplies until the panic ended.

Carson's ratings usually substantially led his time slot, in spite of the fact that he intermittently faced many other late-night competitors including Les Crane, Bill Dana, David Frost, Regis Philbin, Alan Thicke, Jerry Lewis, Joan Rivers, David Brenner, Pat Sajak, Ron Reagan, Dennis Miller, and most notably Steve Allen, Arsenio Hall, Joey Bishop, Merv Griffin and Dick Cavett (Carson saw his friend Cavett as his real competition but Cavett was on ABC, a much smaller network at the time).

As prime time variety shows such as The Ed Sullivan Show faded in prominence over the course of the 1970s, Carson's Tonight Show emerged as a showcase for all kinds of talent, as well as continuing the tradition of a vaudeville-style variety show. Carson's show continued Paar's tradition of launching the careers of a number of comedians, in Carson's case including Jerry Seinfeld, David Letterman, Joan Rivers, Jeff Foxworthy, Ellen DeGeneres, Freddie Prinze, David Brenner, Tim Allen, Drew Carey and Roseanne Barr.

Carson also frequently used guest hosts, especially after 1981 when he negotiated a contract that gave him numerous weeks off every year, as well as Mondays. Frequent guest hosts (over 50 episodes each) included Joey Bishop (177 times, mostly in the 1960s), Joan Rivers (93, during the 1970s and 1980s), John Davidson (87), Bob Newhart (87), David Brenner (70), McLean Stevenson (58), Jerry Lewis (52, mostly in the 1960s), David Letterman (51, mostly between 1980 and 1981) and Jay Leno. By the late 1980s, Leno was designated the permanent and only guest host, and consequently hosted several dozen episodes each year, for a total of 333 "guest host" appearances during Carson's tenure.

=== Jay Leno (1992–2009) ===
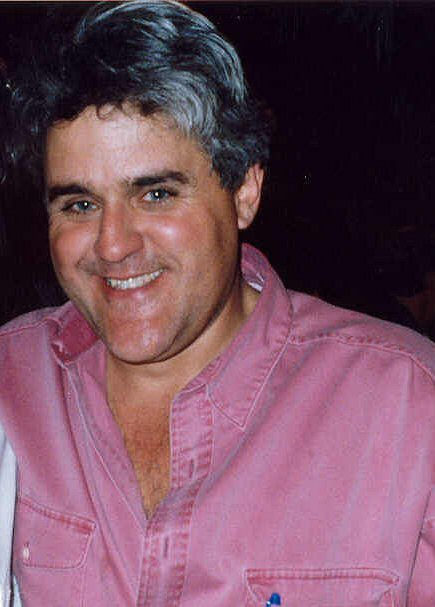
Jay Leno in 1993

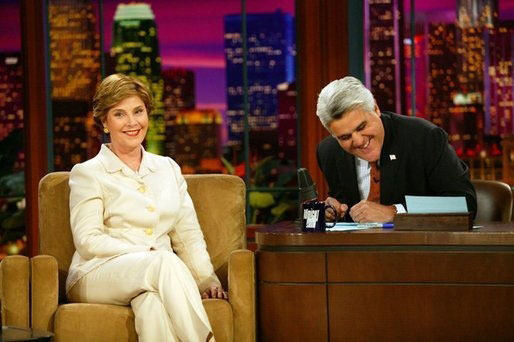
First Lady Laura Bush and Jay Leno

On May 22, 1992, Johnny Carson retired after three decades behind the iconic late-night desk, and was replaced by Jay Leno amid national and media controversy. David Letterman wanted to move into that earlier time slot from his Late Night spot (which had been broadcast following Carson's program) after The Tonight Show, and was considered personally by Carson (whose opinion was not revealed until several years later) as his natural successor despite Leno having been Carson's permanent guest host for several years. Letterman, having had his heart set on the earlier time slot in spite of Leno's ratings success as recurring substitute host, left NBC (on Carson's advice) and joined rival network CBS. Their new program and entry into the late-night television universe, Late Show with David Letterman, aired in the same slot and competed head to head against The Tonight Show for the better part of two decades, although Leno consistently enjoyed higher ratings after the first two years.

On September 27, 2004, the 50th anniversary of the show's premiere, NBC announced that Leno would be succeeded by Conan O'Brien in 2009. The network shocked Leno, who had been consistently number one in the time period, when he was told that he would be fired in five years, with O'Brien taking over the slot at that time. Leno told his audience about this unique network decision at the beginning of his next show, mentioning that he had accepted it, noting that he wanted to avoid repeating the hard feelings that had somehow developed with Letterman, and called O'Brien "certainly the most deserving person for the job" in the wake of his (Leno's) eventual departure. Five years later, what was to have been the final episode of The Tonight Show with Leno as host aired on Friday, May 29, 2009.

Not wanting Leno, who remained number one in the ratings, to move to a competing network, NBC signed the host to a new contract to host a new prime-time talk show beginning in September 2009, entitled The Jay Leno Show, with a format similar to his Tonight Show except that he was contractually prohibited from using a desk on the show. In a departure from network programming conventions of the time, the new show aired every weeknight at 10 p.m. Eastern/Pacific, competing with expensively produced narrative series on other networks and leading into affiliates' local news broadcasts and O'Brien's Tonight Show.

=== Conan O'Brien (2009–2010) ===
Will Ferrell and Conan O'Brien

Conan O'Brien replaced Leno as host on The Tonight Show on Monday, June 1, 2009 from a newly constructed studio inside Stage 1 of the Universal Studios Hollywood backlot, temporarily ending an era (since 1972) of recording the show in Burbank.

==== 2010 timeslot conflict and Leno's return ====
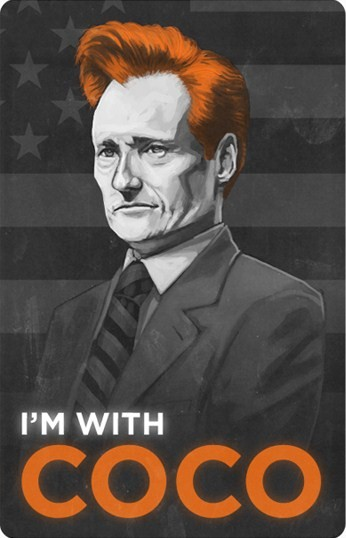
O'Brien quickly gained online support during the controversy.

After a strong debut week, O'Brien's total audience fell precipitously over the summer months, and the program began losing to Late Show with David Letterman in overall ratings. In contrast, O'Brien's performance in the crucial 18–49 demographic was favorable, and it was found that he had brought down the median age of The Tonight Show audience by a decade compared with his predecessor, indicating that a generational shift was taking effect as O'Brien established himself in an earlier timeslot. Taking this into account, columnist Tom Shales assessed in August 2009 that O'Brien was in a better position than Leno had been when he began his Tonight Show run in 1992; Leno consistently lost to Letterman in the ratings for eighteen months before eventually cementing his number one status.

The Jay Leno Show debuted in September 2009, three months into O'Brien's Tonight Show tenure, performing to significantly lower ratings than the primetime dramas it had replaced on NBC and trailing the competition. NBC had expected the drop, having calculated that lower ratings would be balanced by a talk show's correspondingly lower expense compared to more popular scripted programming. In the 11:35 period, The Late Show would largely maintain its lead over The Tonight Show in total viewers in early Fall, during which Letterman was receiving tabloid attention due to a blackmail scandal. In addition, The Tonight Show with Conan O'Brien was in the unusual situation of being a talk show following a talk show hosted by its predecessor on the same network, and the booking war that resulted often left The Tonight Show getting second dibs on guests. One publicist reported that the aggression was such that The Jay Leno Show had signaled to potential guests that doing O'Brien's program before Leno's would be punished with secondary placement in the line-up.

Though NBC claimed that the performance of The Jay Leno Show offered no surprises and that O'Brien was meeting expectations as well, the network had failed to anticipate the impact that Leno's weaker 10 pm lead-in would have on the local 11 pm news, which suffered a drastic drop in ratings (between 25%–50% nationwide) as a demonstrable result. As the affiliates rely on the revenue generated during the news, this generated a furor from the local stations and placed pressure on NBC to quickly fix the 10 pm situation, which was contributing to a cascading effect on the ratings of The Tonight Show with Conan O'Brien and Late Night with Jimmy Fallon, although the ratings of O'Brien's Tonight Show had already nosedived months before Leno's prime time show went on the air.

On January 7, 2010, multiple media outlets reported that beginning March 1, 2010, Leno would move from his 10 p.m. weeknight time slot back to the traditional Tonight Show slot at 11:35. Under this proposal, Leno's show would be shortened from an hour to 30 minutes, which would make the monologue, Leno's most popular segment, the essence of the program. This would move The Tonight Show to 12:05 a.m., a post-midnight start for the first time in its sixty-year history, while Late Night with Jimmy Fallon would be pushed to 1:05 am, and Last Call with Carson Daly would likely be cancelled. Under NBC's (later contested) interpretation of O'Brien's contract, the host was only guaranteed The Tonight Show in name rather than the 11:35 pm slot with which it was synonymous.

On January 10, NBC confirmed it would be moving Leno out of primetime as of February 12 and intended to move him back to late-night as soon as possible. TMZ reported that O'Brien was given no advance notice of this change, and that NBC offered him a choice: The Tonight Show in a 12:05 a.m. time slot, or the option to leave the network. On January 12, O'Brien issued a press release that stated he would not continue with Tonight if it was moved to a 12:05 a.m. time slot, saying, "I believe that delaying The Tonight Show into the next day to accommodate another comedy program will seriously damage what I consider to be the greatest franchise in the history of broadcasting. The Tonight Show at 12:05 simply isn't The Tonight Show."

When Oprah Winfrey later quoted this statement to Leno during an episode of The Oprah Winfrey Show in the aftermath of the fallout, he responded: "Well, if you look at where [Conan's Tonight Show] ratings were, it was already destructive to the franchise". Leno was criticized for his remark, which contradicted his statement that "I think Conan is doing fine" mere months earlier, after which O'Brien's ratings were on an upward trend. Some observers considered the portrayal of O'Brien's ouster as being specifically about the host's ratings to be spin, as it ignored O'Brien's far less expensive contract (and thus far less expensive buyout), O'Brien's improving ratings before the controversy, and O'Brien's younger demographics, all of which suggested profitability.

After the decision was made to reinstate Leno, NBC executives and Leno maintained in the media that O'Brien's ratings were responsible for his removal from the traditional Tonight Show time slot, while O'Brien's supporters argued that the incumbent host had been denied the unambiguous transition, network support and time to grow that his predecessor had received. In addition, it was pointed out that Leno's 10 pm program, rather than O'Brien's performance, had forced the need for line-up changes, while Leno's penalty clause all but guaranteed his continued presence on NBC late night after the cancellation of his primetime show. O'Brien's rating surge during the controversy was also seen by some of his proponents as having the potential to be the host's "Hugh Grant moment" – an allusion to a 1995 interview on The Tonight Show with Jay Leno that aired shortly after the British actor had been caught publicly soliciting a prostitute. Leno's interview with Grant was widely watched due to the scandal, and Leno's fortunes in his rivalry with Letterman permanently turned around in its wake.

The New York Post advanced a theory that O'Brien being the cheaper host to lose was the cardinal factor in NBC's decision to negotiate his departure. The Post claimed that Leno had an "ironclad" guarantee for $150 million if he had been taken off the air, far higher than what it would cost for O'Brien to depart the network. Skip Brittenham, an entertainment attorney and partner at the law firm that had negotiated Leno's contract, was later asked about this claim in an interview. Though Brittenham refused to comment on the veracity of the publicly reported penalty figure, he allowed that "I think the facts speak for themselves."

On January 21, it was announced that NBC had struck a deal with O'Brien in which he would leave The Tonight Show and receive a $33 million payout – effectively a buyout of his three-year contract, which was reputed to be approximately $12 million a year. O'Brien's staff of almost 200 would receive $12 million divided in their departure, making the total of the settlement $45 million. O'Brien's final episode aired on Friday, January 22, ending his relationship with NBC after 22 years. Leno resumed hosting The Tonight Show on March 1, 2010, after NBC's coverage of the 2010 Winter Olympics concluded.

O'Brien returned to late-night television on November 8, 2010 (after his non-compete agreement expired), hosting the self-owned Conan on cable channel TBS. Conan remained partnered with TBS until 2021, although his show was truncated from an hour to thirty minutes in length in 2019 due to ratings issues. Conan's final episode on TBS aired on June 24, 2021.

=== Leno's second tenure (2010–2014) ===
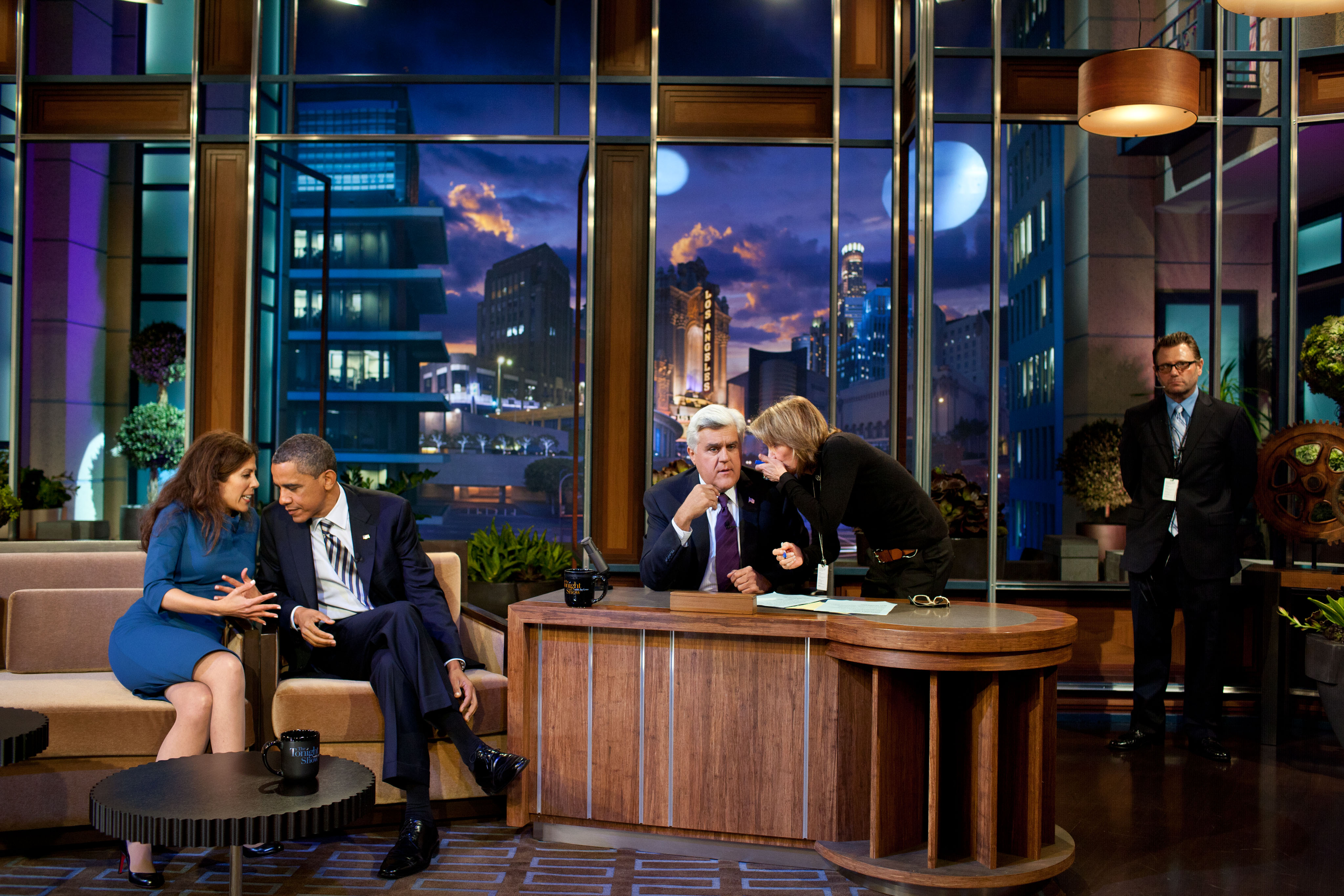
Leno and President Barack Obama on the set of The Tonight Show during a break in taping, October 25, 2011.

On March 1, 2010, Jay Leno returned to The Tonight Show, with Wally Wingert as his announcer. On April 12, 2010, bandleader Kevin Eubanks announced his departure after 18 years (15 years as bandleader) on May 28. Rickey Minor replaced him as bandleader on June 7. On July 1, 2010, Variety reported that only six months into its second life, Leno's Tonight Show posted its lowest ratings since 1992. By September 2010, Leno's ratings had fallen below O'Brien's when he had hosted The Tonight Show, although O'Brien's ratings had spiked during the show's final days during the media publicity onslaught, and this tally pivots upon that anomalous spike in O'Brien's ratings. NBC ratings specialist Tom Bierbaum commented that due to the host being out of late-night television for a period of time and the subsequent 2010 Tonight Show conflict, Leno's ratings fall was "not a surprise at all." In October 2010, David Letterman beat Leno's program in the ratings, for the first time since Leno returned to hosting The Tonight Show. By May 2011, Leno regained the lead over Letterman and held it until leaving the show in February 2014. In August 2012, The Los Angeles Times reported that The Tonight Show was in trouble for a number of reasons, notably that NBC was losing money. The Times later elaborated, noting that advertising revenue from The Tonight Show had dropped more than 40% since 2007, from $255.9 million annually to $146.1 million. Still, despite these problems, during 2012–13, The Tonight Show with Jay Leno was consistently the highest-ranking late-night show, regularly achieving audiences of over 3.5 million, according to Nielsen ratings. Leno's audience became considerably smaller after its peak 2002–03 season, when it routinely attracted 5.8 million viewers a night. This was partly due to the continuing fragmentation of the TV audience, with an increasing number of cable shows, such as The Daily Show with Jon Stewart, The Colbert Report and Conan O'Brien's new show on TBS, in addition to competition with Letterman on CBS and since January 8, 2013, Jimmy Kimmel Live! on ABC, although Leno continued to lead the time slot.

On April 3, 2013, after a dispute with the network over Leno's joking about the network's poor prime time performance in his monologues, NBC announced that Leno would retire in 2014, with Late Night host Jimmy Fallon taking over The Tonight Show after the conclusion of NBC's coverage of the 2014 Winter Olympics. It was Leno's suggestion to use NBC's coverage of the Olympics as a springboard for Fallon's tenure. The date was later moved up a week to February 17, midway through the Olympics.

Leno's last Tonight Show aired on February 6, 2014, featuring guests Billy Crystal (Leno's first guest in 1992) and Garth Brooks. Leno gave a tearful goodbye at the end of the program, calling himself "the luckiest guy in the world", and reflecting on his time as host as "the greatest 22 years of my life."

=== Jimmy Fallon (2014–present) ===
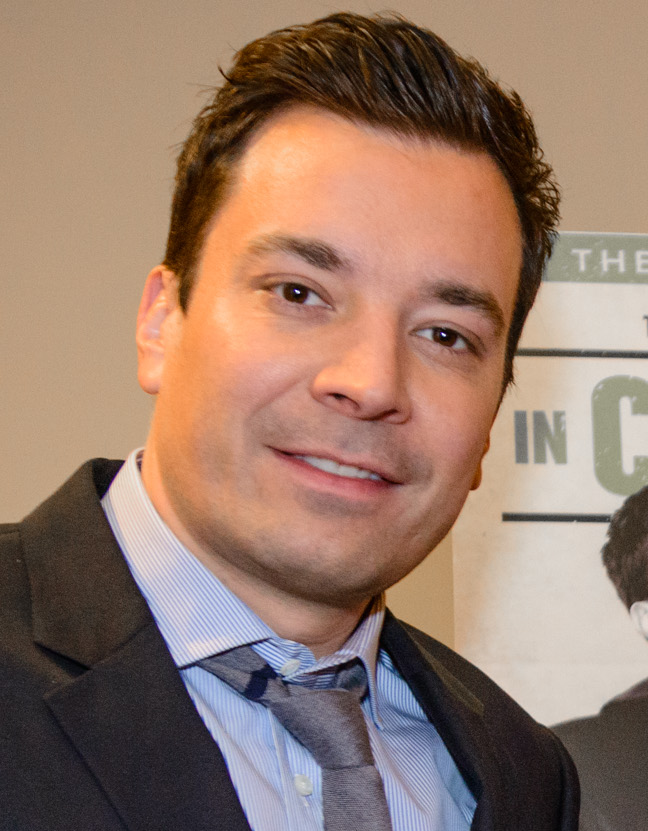
Fallon in late 2013, months before inheriting The Tonight Show.

Jimmy Fallon (who had hosted The Tonight Show's follow-up show, Late Night, since 2009) assumed The Tonight Show hosting role on February 17, 2014, with his initial guests being Will Smith and the rock band U2, plus an assortment of celebrity cameos, including an appearance by one of Fallon's direct broadcast competitors, Stephen Colbert (who would later replace David Letterman on the competing The Late Show in 2015), and another by former permanent guest host Joan Rivers, making her first appearance on Tonight since cutting ties with Carson in 1986. The show's opening sequence was directed by filmmaker Spike Lee.

As part of the transition to Fallon, The Tonight Show would be brought back to New York City after 42 years in Southern California. Approximately $5 million was budgeted to renovate Studio 6B, where Fallon recorded Late Night. The move also enabled NBC to take advantage of a newly enacted New York state tax credit for talk shows that are "filmed before a studio audience of at least 200, as long as they carry a production budget of at least $30 million and have been shot outside New York for at least five seasons." Studio 6B is also where Jack Paar and Johnny Carson hosted The Tonight Show before the show moved to Burbank in 1972. Lorne Michaels (producer of Saturday Night Live, in which Fallon appeared prior to hosting Late Night) became executive producer of The Tonight Show.

Fallon's Tonight Show has gone on the road to produce episodes remotely in its first year, spending four days at Universal Orlando Resort in Florida in June 2014 to promote new attractions at NBCUniversal's theme parks there. In February 2015, Fallon presented a special Sunday night show from Phoenix, Arizona airing after NBC's coverage of Super Bowl XLIX, followed by four days of shows in Stage 1 at Universal Studios Hollywood in Los Angeles (where Conan O'Brien's version was produced).

Aside from the title change and a new set, Fallon's version of The Tonight Show is nearly identical to the format of Late Night he employed, as he imported many of his signature comedy bits and much of his Late Night staff, including house band The Roots and announcer Steve Higgins. Prior to the transition, Fallon said, "In our heads, we've been doing The Tonight Show for five years. We're just on at a later hour."

== Music and announcers ==
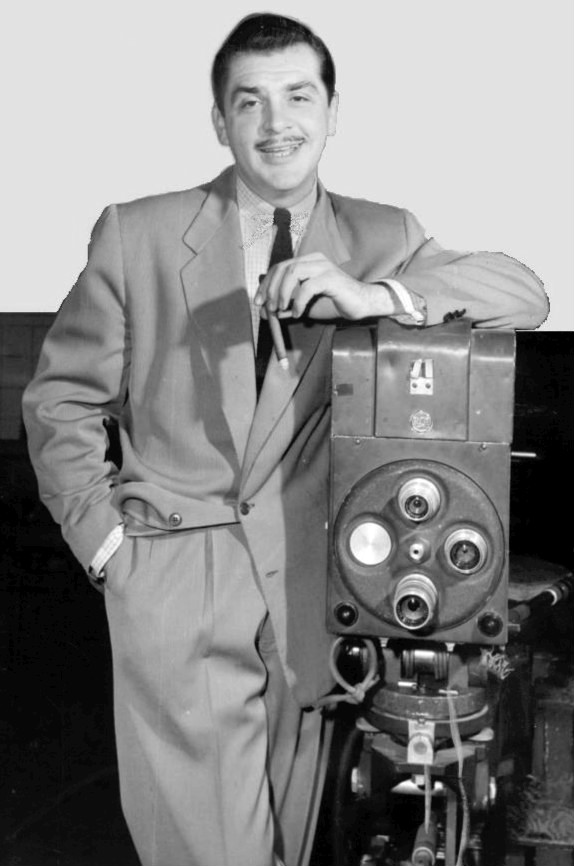
Ernie Kovacs, regular substitute host during the Steve Allen era, and hosting his own version of the show twice a week in his final season.

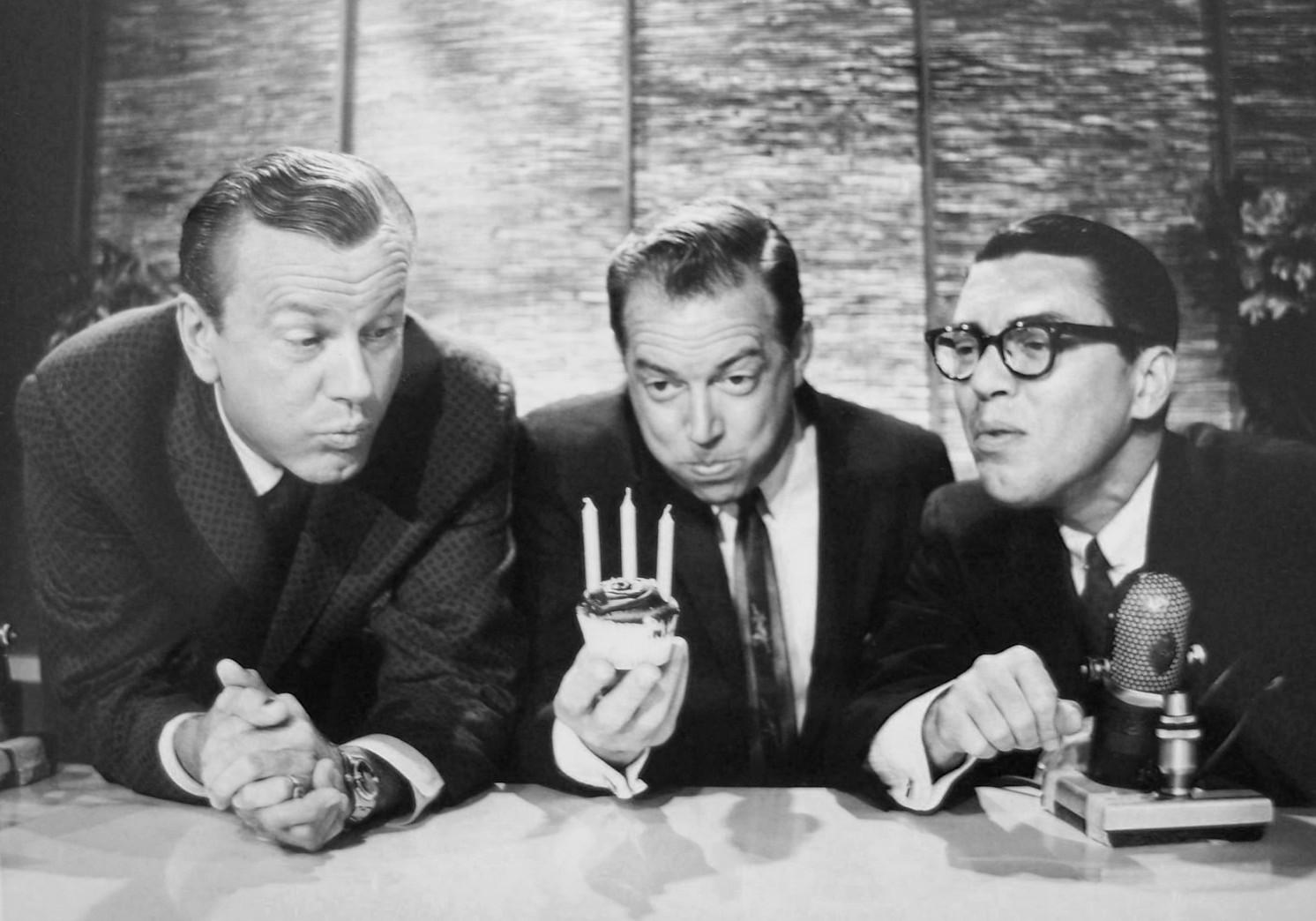
Host Jack Paar, announcer/sidekick Hugh Downs, and bandleader Jose Melis during the Paar era.

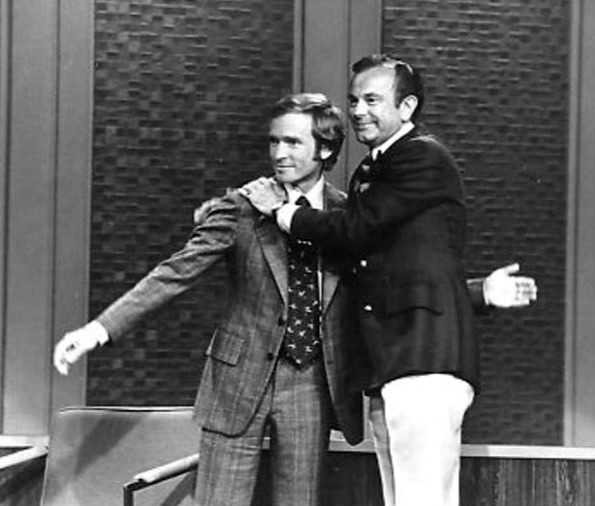
Dick Cavett and Jack Paar, 1973

Music during the show's introduction and commercial segues is supplied by The Tonight Show Band. This ensemble was a jazz big band until the end of Johnny Carson's tenure. Skitch Henderson was the bandleader during the Steve Allen and early Carson years, followed briefly by Milton DeLugg (who had previously led the band on Broadway Open House and later became the musical director of The Gong Show). Gene Rayburn served as Allen's announcer and sidekick and also guest-hosted some episodes all the way through the early part of Carson's run. Bill Wendell, who announced Kovacs's version of Tonight later served as David Letterman's announcer in the 1980s and early 1990s.

The Lou Stein Trio originally provided musical accompaniment during the short run of Tonight! America After Dark, which ran for six months between the Steve Allen/Ernie Kovacs and Jack Paar eras of The Tonight Show, and was later replaced by the Mort Lindsey Quartet, which in turn, was replaced by the Johnny Guarnieri Quartet. José Melis led the band for Jack Paar, and, after a short while of using comic actor Franklin Pangborn, Hugh Downs was Paar's announcer. For most of Johnny Carson's run on the show, the show's band, then called "The NBC Orchestra" was led by Doc Severinsen, former trumpet soloist in Henderson's band for Steve Allen.

When McMahon was away from the show, Severinsen was the substitute announcer and Tommy Newsom would lead the band. (Newsom also took over when Severinsen was absent from the show.) On the rare occasions that both McMahon and Severinsen were away, Newsom would take the announcer's chair and the band would be led by assistant musical director Shelly Cohen.

Severinsen's big band featured several accomplished sidemen in addition to saxophonist Newsom, including trumpeter Snooky Young, pianist Ross Tompkins, drummer Ed Shaughnessy, trumpeter John Audino, trumpeter Conte Candoli, saxophonist Pete Christlieb, and jazz trumpet legend Clark Terry. The band frequently appeared on camera in the "Stump the Band" segments, where an audience member would dare the band to play some obscure song title, and the band would comically improvise something appropriate. The routine was played for full comedy value and the band was not really expected to know the songs; on two occasions the band did answer correctly, much to the maestro's surprise. Severinsen was heard to ask incredulously, "You mean we actually...?"

When Carson's tenure ended in 1992, the orchestra was axed and replaced by a smaller ensemble. The first bandleader during Leno's tenure was Branford Marsalis. In 1992, The Tonight Show Band also welcomed its first female member, Vicki Randle. In 1995, Kevin Eubanks replaced Marsalis, though the Marsalis-written theme was used throughout Leno's first tenure. On March 29, 2004, John Melendez from The Howard Stern Show replaced Leno's long-time announcer Edd Hall.

Conan O'Brien announced on the February 18, 2009, episode of Late Night that The Max Weinberg 7 (rechristened as The Tonight Show Band, and adding a second percussionist), the house band on that program, would be accompanying him to The Tonight Show as his version's house band. It was announced February 23, 2009, that former Late Night sidekick Andy Richter would be O'Brien's announcer. Richter replaced O'Brien's former long-time announcer Joel Godard (who stayed behind in New York) when his rendition of The Tonight Show began.

For the second incarnation of The Tonight Show with Jay Leno, a new bandleader was selected, though original bandleader Kevin Eubanks returned for a few weeks in the transition. He officially announced his departure after 18 years on April 12, 2010, with his final episode airing May 28. Rickey Minor was announced as his replacement, and took over on June 7. The show also inaugurated a new theme tune composed by Minor.

With the return of Leno's Tonight Show in March 2010, Melendez continued in the writing role, which he was assigned to on the prime-time The Jay Leno Show, although the announcing duty went to Wally Wingert.

Jimmy Fallon began hosting The Tonight Show on February 17, 2014; his house band on Late Night, The Roots, joined him, as did announcer Steve Higgins. Fallon has used guest hosts rarely, co-hosting the April 9th, 2018, broadcast with Cardi B, Kevin Hart co-hosting the September 19, 2018, broadcast, Dave Grohl co-hosting the May 24, 2021, broadcast, Jimmy Kimmel hosting the April 1, 2022, broadcast (with Fallon swapping duties to guest host Jimmy Kimmel Live!), Shawn Mendes co-hosting the April 29, 2022, broadcast, Megan Thee Stallion co-hosting the August 11, 2022, broadcast, Demi Lovato co-hosting the August 17, 2022, broadcast, Jack Harlow co-hosting the October 6, 2022, broadcast and Bad Bunny co-hosting the January 13, 2025, broadcast.

== Broadcasting milestones ==
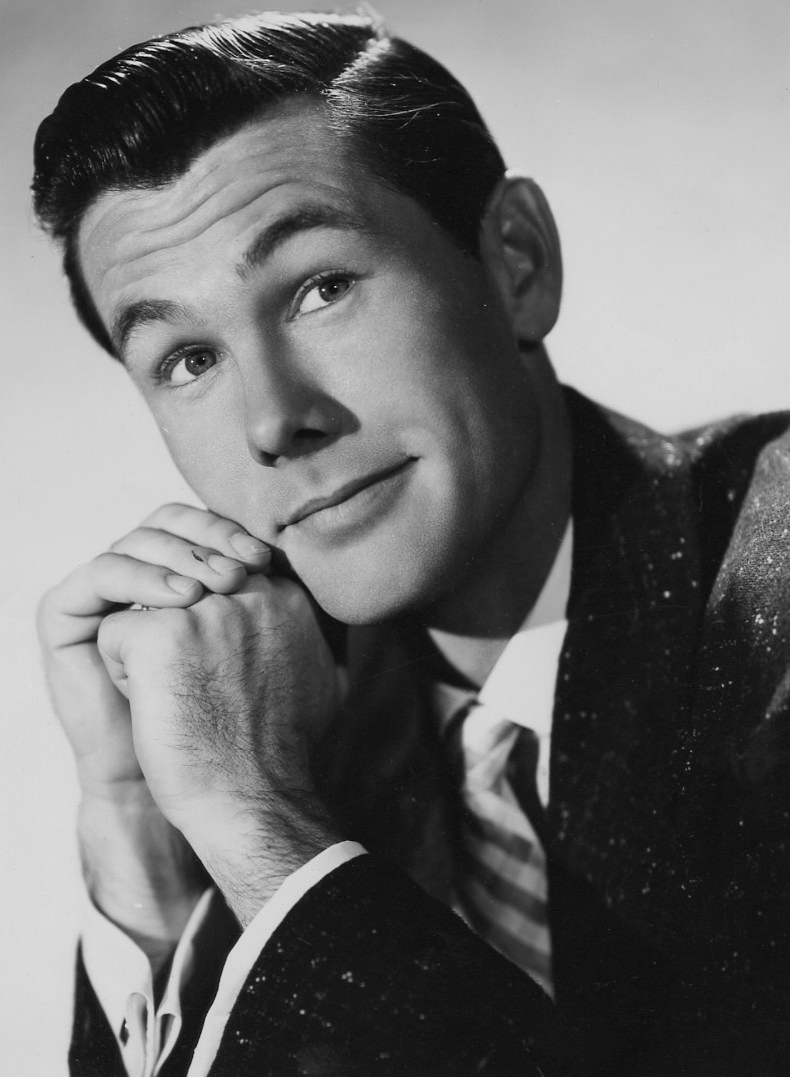
Johnny Carson in 1957

The Tonight Show began its broadcast at 11:15 p.m. ET, following an affiliate's 15-minute news broadcast. As more affiliates lengthened their local news programs to 30 minutes, the show began doing two openings, one for the affiliates that began at 11:15 and another for those who joined at 11:30. By early 1965, only 43 of the 190 affiliated stations carried the entire show. After February 1965, Johnny Carson refused to appear until 11:30, and Ed McMahon "hosted" the 11:15 segment. Carson was not happy with this arrangement since McMahon's monologue covered the same ground as Carson's, and he finally insisted that the show's start time be changed to 11:30. As a result, the two-opening practice was eliminated in December 1966.

When the show began it was broadcast live. On January 12, 1959, the show began to be videotaped for broadcast later on the same day, although initially the Thursday night programs were kept live. Color broadcasts began on September 19, 1960.

The Tonight Show became the first American television program to broadcast with MTS stereo sound in 1984, at first sporadically, by audio engineer Ron Estes. Regular use of MTS began in 1985. In September 1991, the show's start time was shifted by five minutes to 11:35, in order to give network affiliates the opportunity to sell additional advertising during their late local newscasts. On April 26, 1999, the show started broadcasting in 1080i HDTV, becoming the first American nightly talk show to be shot in that format.

On March 19, 2009, The Tonight Show became the first late-night talk show in history to have the sitting President of the United States as a guest, when President Barack Obama visited Jay Leno.

Throughout the years, the starting time and the length of The Tonight Show has changed multiple times.

=== Weeknight episodes ===
Begin date	End date	Nights	Start	End	Notes
September 27, 1954	October 5, 1956	Mon–Fri	11:15	1:00	Allen
October 8, 1956	January 4, 1957	Mon–Fri	11:15	12:30	Allen/Kovacs
January 7, 1957	December 30, 1966	Mon–Fri	11:15^{[§]}	1:00	Allen/Kovacs, Paar, Carson
January 2, 1967	September 5, 1980	Mon–Fri	11:30	1:00	Carson
September 8, 1980	August 30, 1991	Mon–Fri	11:30	12:30	Carson
September 2, 1991	February 6, 2014	Mon–Fri	11:35	12:37	Carson, Leno, O'Brien, Leno
February 17, 2014	present	Mon–Thurs	11:34	12:37	Fallon

^{§} Many NBC affiliates chose not to carry the first fifteen minutes of the show during this period, instead preferring to air a local newscast from 11 p.m. to 11:30 p.m. As of February 1965, Carson refused to host the first 15 minutes of the program, preferring to wait until the full network was in place before delivering his opening monologue; Ed McMahon hosted the program's first 15 minutes instead. This persisted for nearly two years, until the show's start time was finally adjusted to 11:30 p.m. in January 1967.

=== Weekend repeats ===
From 1965 to 1975, until the premiere of Saturday Night Live, weekend repeats of The Tonight Show were staples of the NBC schedule. These repeats ran in the following time slots:

Begin date	End date	Nights	Start	End	Notes
January 9, 1965	January 1, 1967	Sat or Sun	11:15	1:00	Repeats, known as The Saturday/Sunday Tonight Show
January 7, 1967	September 28, 1975	Sat or Sun	11:30	1:00	Repeats; known as The Best of Carson and The Weekend Tonight Show

== Gags, sketches, and segments ==
Allen

- Answer Man: Allen would come up with the answer to an unknown question, then read the question, which would invariably be the punchline to a joke.
- Man on the street interviews: often featured actors Don Knotts, Louis Nye and Tom Poston, though Allen also performed impromptu bits with non-professional civilians.
- ... and Costello: Lou Costello would re-enact his classic Abbott and Costello comedy bits with Poston or Nye in the place of the then-briefly-retired Bud Abbott.
- Crazy Shots: Later known as "Wild Pictures". Allen's supporting cast and guest stars would participate in quick visual gags while Allen played piano accompaniment.
- Steve and Eydie: A vocal duo consisting of up-and-coming singers Steve Lawrence and Eydie Gormé, who performed interludes (in a relic of the old-time radio era when entertainment programs included vocal groups in addition to house bands). The two would marry near the end of Allen's run and remained together until Gormé died in 2013.

Kovacs

- Eugene: A befuddled and bumbling character largely performed in pantomime. The week of Kovacs's last episodes of Tonight, Eugene received a prime-time special, Silent Show.

Paar

- Candid Camera: The off-again, on-again show, hosted by Allen Funt since radio's heyday, was a segment on The Tonight Show in 1958.
- Stump the Band: Audience members are asked to name an obscure song and the band tries to play it. If the band does not know the song, it usually breaks into a comical piece of music. This segment went on to become part of Carson's Tonight Show.
- Telephone Game: Another improvisational music bit, this one had Melis building songs around four-digit numbers (ostensibly the last four digits of an audience member's phone number).

Carson

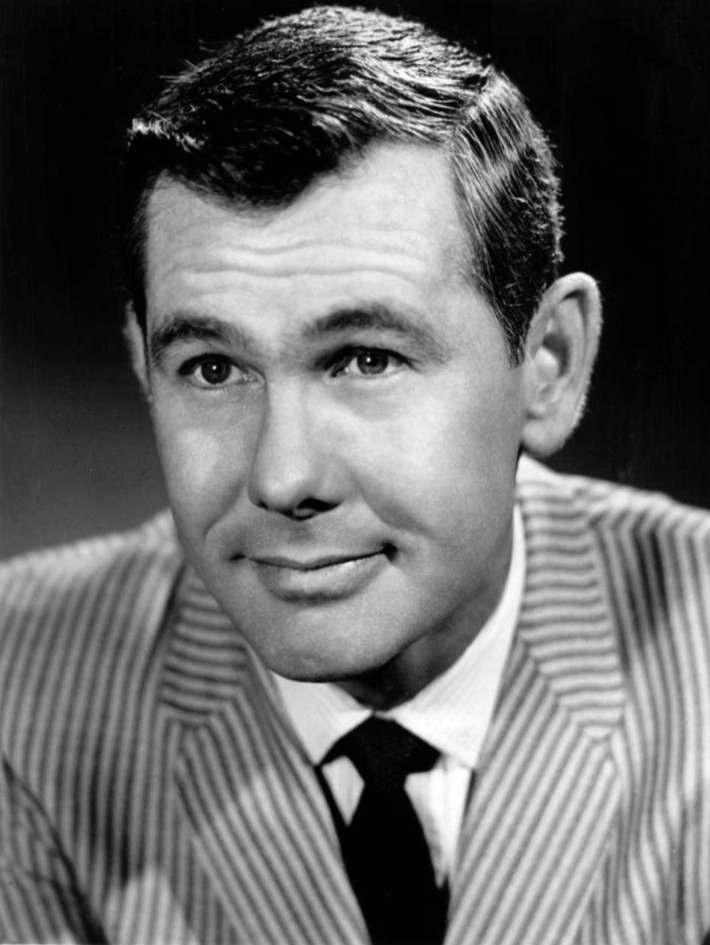
Johnny Carson in 1965

- Carnac the Magnificent: Carson plays a psychic who is given sealed envelopes (that McMahon invariably states, with a flourish, have been kept "hermetically sealed inside a mayonnaise jar underneath Funk & Wagnalls' porch since noon today"). Carnac holds an envelope to his head and recites the punchline to a joke contained within the envelope, he then rips open the envelope and reads the matching question inside. Sample: "Saucepan... Who was Peter Pan's wino brother?" If a joke falls flat with the audience, Carnac invariably passes a comedic curse upon them (e.g., "May a bloated yak change the temperature of your jacuzzi!"). Carnac appears to be modeled after one of Allen's earlier gags, "The Question Man," in which Allen is given an answer to which he then provides the punchline in the form of a question.
- The Tea Time Movie:, with "Art Fern" and the Matinée Lady (originally Paula Prentiss, then a parade of one shots including Edy Williams, Juliet Prowse and Lee Meredith, then for many years Carol Wayne, then Danuta Wesley, and finally Teresa Ganzel). Carson once said that Art Fern was his favorite character: "He's so sleazy!" Huckster Art usually wore a loud suit, lavish toupee, and pencil mustache, and spoke in the high, nasal approximation of Jackie Gleason's "Reginald van Gleason III" character. A parody of 1950s-style, fast-talking advertising pitchmen, the Tea Time Movie consists of a rapid-fire series of fake advertisements for products and companies supposedly sponsoring a mid-afternoon movie. Invariably the jokes refer to his buxom Matinée Lady assistant, and at least once in every skit a variation of the "Slauson Cutoff" joke is made (e.g., "You can find our store by heading down Hwy. 101 until you get to the Slauson Cutoff. Get out of the car, cut off your slauson, get back in the car."), as is a reference to "Drive until you get to... (a map is unfolded to reveal a table fork) the fork in the road!" Art would then return us to today's movie (like "Tarzan and Cheetah Have to Get Married" or "Rin Tin Tin Gets Fixed Fixed Fixed," etc.), followed by an antique, four-second film clip. Back to Art, caught necking with the Matinée Lady before announcing another movie and another commercial.

Leno

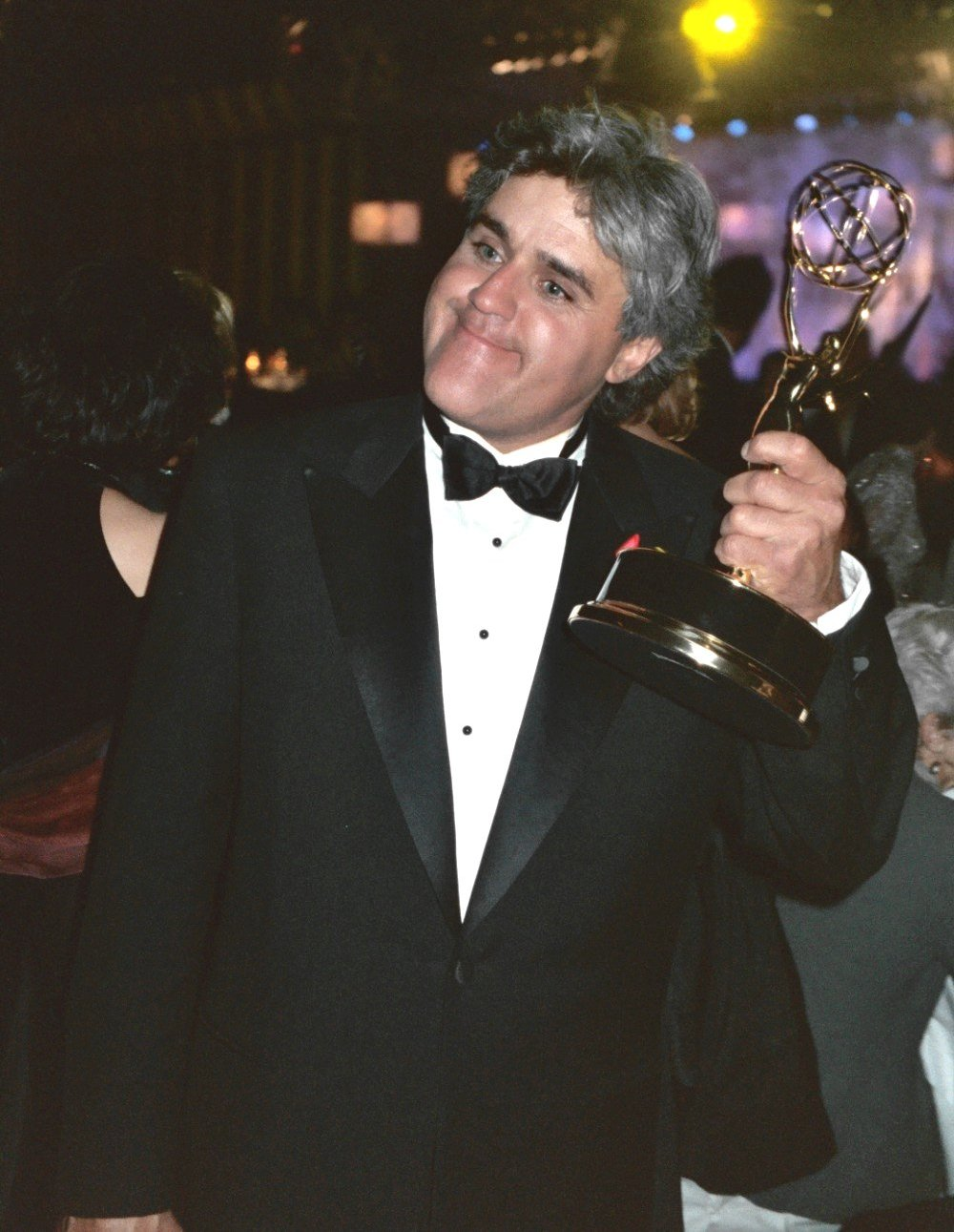
Jay Leno in 1995

- Headlines (Monday): Humorous print items sent in by viewers. These real-life headlines and advertisements usually contain typographical errors, double entendres, mismatched juxtapositions and/or unintentionally inappropriate items (wedding announcements with peculiar name combinations were a recurring theme). The segment usually starts out with a fake, humorous Headline during the introduction for the segment, such as Arabs Wish Bush "A Happy Shoe Year!", usually reflecting some current event.
- Jaywalking: A prerecorded segment, "Jaywalking" is a play on the host's name and the illegal practice of jaywalking. Leno asks people questions about current news and other topics in public areas around Los Angeles (usually Hollywood Boulevard, Melrose Avenue or Universal Studios). Most responses are outrageously incorrect; for example, one person believed that Abraham Lincoln was the first president, and another could not identify a picture of Hillary Clinton. Sometimes the questions are of the "What color is the White House?" level, such as asking in what country the Panama Canal is located. Up to 15 people are interviewed in an hour or less for each segment, with about nine interviews used on the air.
- Stuff We Found on eBay: Outrageous, real-life items available on the auction Web site eBay are shown, with the audience asked to guess whether or not the item was sold.
- Unusual Mother's Day, Father's Day, Christmas gifts: Gift items appropriate for holidays are shown; some real, some phony, all unusual

O'Brien

- Twitter Tracker: In this sketch, Conan is interrupted by an overzealous announcer (voiced by show writer Brian McCann) while lamenting the increasing number of celebrities who are using Twitter. The announcer attempts to prove to Conan that celebrity tweets are exciting by reading some of his favorites, which all describe mundane activities. The sketch is accompanied by increasingly elaborate animations in which the bird from the Twitter logo is repeatedly killed. The announcer tries to persuade Conan to play a game by using a rhyming sentence in which he refers to him as CoCo.
- Wax Fonzie/Wax Tom Cruise: While visiting a warehouse full of poor quality celebrity wax figures, Conan identified two as his favorite and purchased them. One was of Henry Winkler as his Happy Days character Arthur Fonzarelli (whose hand positioning caused Conan to comment that he had just finished up at the urinal), and the other was a creepy-looking figure of Tom Cruise. Both wax figures made appearances on the show, including skits being shot out of a cannon. Wax Tom Cruise for the most part survived, while Wax Fonzie's face became irreplaceable. Wax Fonzie ultimately met its fate when it was obliterated in an explosion, part of a contest involving blowing up the contest winner's old car.
- Ridiculously Expensive Sketches: As an act of mock revenge for NBC forcing him out of The Tonight Show's traditional time slot, O'Brien spent the last few episodes debuting sketches that ostensibly would cost NBC an extremely large amount of money. The sketches used rare and expensive props (usually on loan) and contained media with unusually high licensing fees.

Fallon

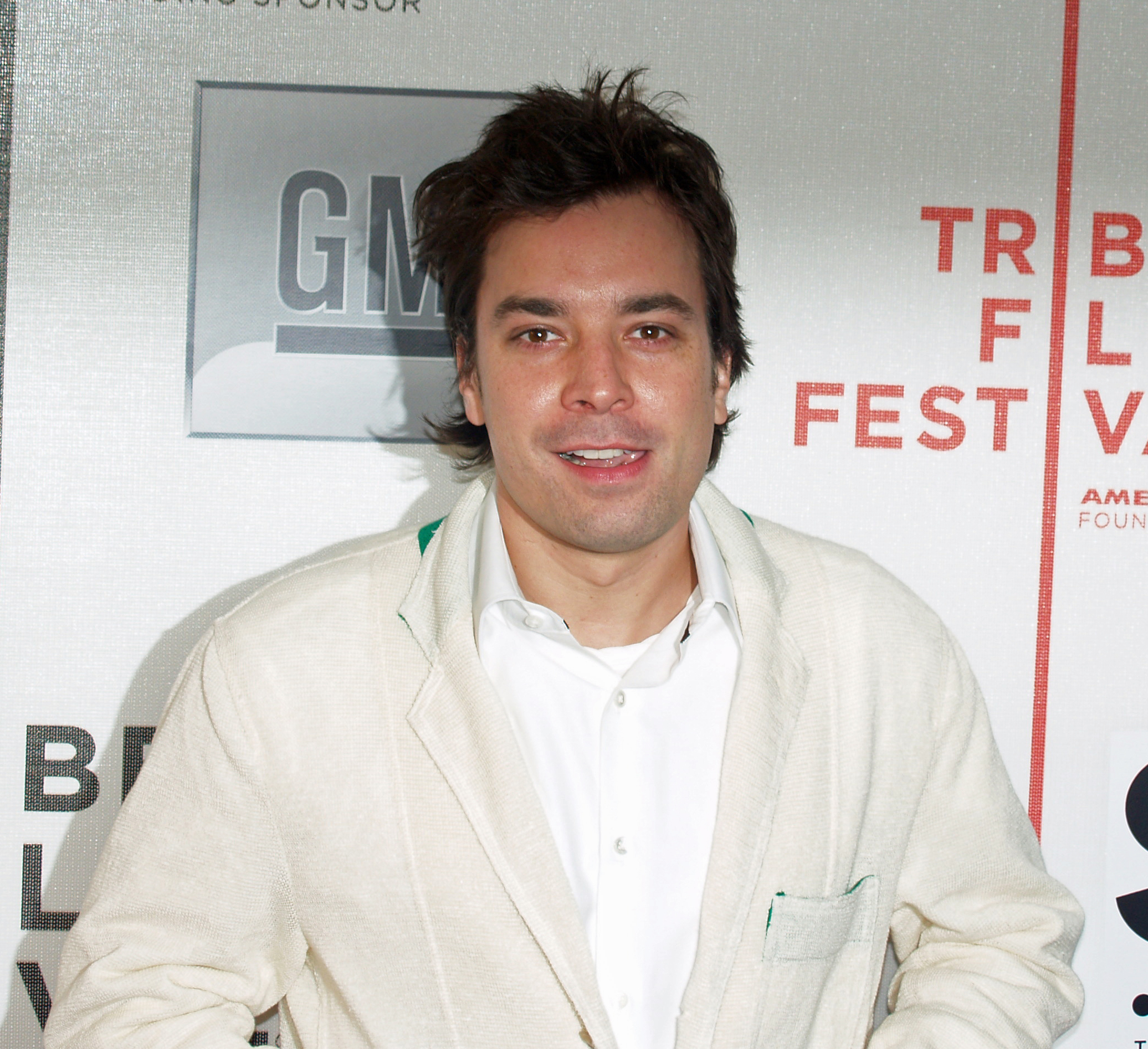
Jimmy Fallon in 2007

Many of Fallon's sketches moved over from Late Night.

- Pros & Cons: Fallon weighs the positives and the negatives on a particular topic of current events, with the "Pro" setting up the punch line, in the form of the "Con".
- Tonight Show Suggestion Box: Fallon responds to written suggestions, purportedly submitted by audience members, about ways to improve the show. As a result, the segment usually features three or four unrelated short comedy bits.
- Tonight Show Hashtags: Fallon puts out a call on Twitter each Wednesday for viewers to submit funny or absurd tweets based around a particular hashtag topic. Fallon then reads a few of the most comedic responses on Thursday's show.
- Thank You Notes: Noting that Friday is when he usually takes care of "personal stuff" and that he ran out of time during the day, Fallon writes his weekly "thank you notes" on the air. Fallon thanks people in the news, current events, inanimate objects, and other random subjects to comedic effect. Each note is accompanied by reflective piano music from The Roots' James Poyser, and usually results in a comedic exchange between Fallon and Higgins.
- Tonight Show Superlatives: Usually done as a tie-in to that week's Sunday Night Football game, Fallon shows photos of athletes and gives them captions styled like those that might be used in a high school yearbook.
- Screen Grabs: Similar to Leno's Headlines bit, viewers submit actual screen shots from various media (phones, internet, television, radio, etc.) that contain typos or similar errors with humorous results.
- Do Not Read List: Jimmy shares real published books found in actual libraries that have awkward titles &/or subject matter, an ironic author's name, or contain some other humorous element.
- Ew!: Jimmy portrays a teenage girl named Sara and invites many celebrities to be in Jimmy's basement. Through the sketch, all "girls" say "ew" a lot. The most popular segment of this sketch is with Seth Rogen and Zac Efron.

== Broadcast ==
The Tonight Show airs on channel 7 in Australia, CTV 2 in Canada, Sky Comedy in the UK, CNBC in Europe, Comedy Central in India, CNBC in Pakistan, Jack TV in the Philippines, OSN in the Middle East and North Africa, and CNBC in Sub-Saharan Africa.

The Tonight Show is also seen around the world. It is broadcast on CNBC Europe, usually three nights after it has been shown in the U.S. The show is screened at 10:30 p.m. AEDST weeknights on The Comedy Channel in Australia, where new episodes are shown hours after its American broadcast. In Sweden, Kanal 5 has shown The Tonight Show (as Jay Leno Show) since the late 1990s with one week's delay. Since October 2006, it is also being aired in India on Zee Café 12 hours after the show is shown in the USA. For the Jimmy Fallon edition of the show, Comedy Central has aired the show 12 hours after the American broadcast since October 27, 2014.

In addition to its broadcast on CNBC Europe, The Tonight Show airs on One in Germany, with German subtitles, weekdays at 11:00 p.m., one day after its American broadcast.

In India and Sri Lanka The Tonight Show airs on Comedy Central India on Weeknights at 11 pm IST/SLST – within 24 hours of the American Broadcast.

Also, in Sri Lanka CNBC Asia (CNBCLife) airs back-to-back editions of the show on weekends.

An early attempt at airing the show by London Weekend Television in the United Kingdom during the early 1980s was unsuccessful, sparking jokes by Carson. On the October 23, 1984, broadcast, guest Paul McCartney had this to say of the show's British run:

Carson: (throwing to commercial) OK, we're gonna have to cut away. We're just gonna see a commercial. We sell things occasionally. It's not like the British telly, you know. You just go forever, ten or twelve [minutes]. British television ends when they – you know, when they want to. McCartney: (jokingly) Yeah, you're just mad because they didn't like your show.

== See also ==
- List of The Tonight Show episodes
- List of late-night American network TV programs
- The Late Shift, a made-for-cable film about Leno and Letterman's vying for host duties on The Tonight Show
