= The Knickerbocker Beer Show =

American local late-night television program

- Also known as: The Steve Allen Show
- Genre: Talk show Variety show
- Starring: Steve Allen
- Announcer: Gene Rayburn
- Music by: Bandleader: Bobby Byrne (1953—1954); Skitch Henderson (1954—1955)
- Opening theme: "Mister Moon"
- Composer: Steve Allen
- Country of origin: United States
- Original language: English

Production
- Production locations: Studio A, 101 West 67th Street, New York City (1953—1954), Hudson Theatre, New York City (1954—1955)
- Running time: 40 minutes (15 minutes after September 24, 1955)

Original release
- Network: WNBT
- Release: July 27, 1953 – October 21, 1955

Related
- Tonight Starring Steve Allen

The Knickerbocker Beer Show is an American late-night talk and variety show hosted by Steve Allen that aired locally in New York City on WNBT from July 27, 1953, to September 24, 1954, and then until 1955 as a truncated local lead-in to the national Tonight show. The 40-minute program aired from 11:20 p.m. to midnight. Named after its sponsor, Knickerbocker Beer, it was often referred to as The Steve Allen Show from shortly after its debut. Gene Rayburn was the announcer, Bobby Byrne led the orchestra, and Steve Lawrence, Helen Dixon and Pat Kirby were regular performers.

Allen played piano, interviewed guests, spoke with members of the studio audience and exchanged jokes with Rayburn and the musical performers. A September 1954 review in Billboard described the local program as the "nucleus" from which NBC's forthcoming Tonight was being built.

When Allen became the host of the national NBC program Tonight on September 27, 1954, the Knickerbocker Beer Show initially continued as a local 15-minute show at 11:15 pm with Allen as host and Skitch Henderson as bandleader, preceding the national Tonight show at 11:30 also hosted by Allen from the same stage. The Knickerbocker Beer Show as a 15-minute local lead-in to Tonight continued until it was replaced on October 24, 1955 by a 5-minute sports news segment, Knickerbocker Powerhouse, leading into The Steve Allen Show, the now 10-minute local lead-in to Tonight. The local Steve Allen Show continued until August 1956 when it was ended.

The show originally originated from Studio A at the former WOR-TV studios at 101 West 67th Street in Manhattan and moved to the Hudson Theatre with the launch of Tonight.
