= Al "Jazzbo" Collins =

US radio announcer

- Also known as: Al "Jazzbeaux" Collins
- Born: Albert Richard Collins; January 4, 1919; Rochester, New York
- Died: September 30, 1997 (aged 78) Marin County, California
- Genres: Jazz
- Occupations: Disc jockey, musician
- Years active: 1940s–1990s

Albert Richard "Jazzbo" Collins (January 4, 1919 – September 30, 1997) was an American disc jockey and musician who hosted Tonight! America After Dark in 1957.

== Early years ==
The son of a musician, Collins was born in Rochester, New York. He was raised on Long Island. His interest in radio developed after he filled in as announcer on the campus radio station at the University of Miami in Florida.

== Career ==
Collins began his professional career as a disc jockey at a bluegrass music station in Logan, West Virginia; by 1943, he was at WKPA in Pittsburgh, moving in 1945 to WIND in Chicago, and in 1946 to KNAK in Salt Lake City. In 1950 he moved to New York City, where he was hired by WNEW. He left there and began working on WRCA radio on December 13, 1954. He became one of the "communicators" on Monitor when it began in 1955. He made several appearances on The Tonight Show with Steve Allen in the early 1950s. In 1953, Allen recited jazz versions of nursery rhymes such as "Little Red Riding Hood".

In 1957, NBC-TV hired him for five weeks as the host of the Tonight show when it was known as Tonight! America After Dark in the period between hosts Steve Allen and Jack Paar. In 1957, Collins starred in an episode of NBC Radio's science fiction radio series X Minus One. By 1959, he was with KSFO in San Francisco. On television, he hosted The Al Collins Show, which aired on KGO-TV. The format included appearances by celebrities such as Moe Howard of The Three Stooges. Later, in the 1960s, he was the host of Jazz for the Asking (VOA), and he worked with several Los Angeles stations late in the decade: KMET (1966), KFI (1967), and KGBS (1968).

Collins changed the spelling of his name to "Jazzbeaux" when he went to WTAE in Pittsburgh in 1969. He moved to WIXZ in Pittsburgh (1973), before returning to the West Coast three years later. While in Pittsburgh, he briefly hosted a late night television show titled Jazzbeauxz Rehearsal, an eclectic sampling of anything that caught Collins's interest. In 1976, he returned to San Francisco, working at KMPX, followed by an all-night program at KGO; he began the program with "Blues in Hoss Flat" by Count Basie. He also worked a late shift at KKIS AM in Pittsburg, California, in 1980. After a stint in New York and WNEW (1981), he was back in San Francisco at KSFO (1983) and KFRC (1986). Then he worked at WNEW (1986–90), KAPX (Marin County, California) in 1990, and hosted a weekly jazz show at KCSM (College of San Mateo, California) from 1993 until his death. Late in life, Collins also narrated Jazzbo's Swingin' Soundies, a series of short 'filler' features for the American Movie Classics cable network, in which he introduced some of the Soundies jukebox musical film shorts from the 1940s.

== Personal life and death ==
Collins was married twice; he had four children and three stepchildren. He died on September 30, 1997, aged 78.

== Discography ==
=== Singles ===
- "Little Red Riding Hood" [matrix: 84492] b/w "Three Little Pigs" [84493] (Brunswick 80226, 7/53)
- "Jack and the Beanstalk" [20181] b/w "Snow White and the Seven Dwarfs" [20182] (Capitol 2580, 8/53)
- "The Invention of the Airplane" [20193] b/w "The Discovery of America" [20194] (Capitol 2624, 10/53)
- "Little Hood Riding Red" [Little Red Riding Hood] [12459] b/w "Pee Little Thrigs" [Three Little Pigs] [12462] (Capitol 2773, 4/54) re-makes of the Brunswick tracks
- "Max" [89216] b/w "Sam" [89217] (Coral 9-61589, 2/56)
- "The Space Man" (with Alan Freed and Steve Allen) [100318] b/w "Jazzbo's Theory" [100319] (Coral 9-61693, 8/56)
- "Prehistoric Hop" [12057] b/w "Beat Love" [12058] (Dot 15944, 4/59)

=== Albums ===
- Spotlight on Percussion (with Kenny Clarke) (Vox, 1955)
- Jazz at the Metropole Cafe (Bethlehem, 1955)
- East Coast Jazz Scene, Vol. 1 (Coral, 1956)
- Presents Swinging at the Opera (Everest, 1960)
- A Lovely Bunch of Al Jazzbo Collins and the Bandidos (Impulse!, 1967)
- Steve Allen's Hip Fables (with Slim Gaillard) (Doctor Jazz/Columbia, 1983)
