= List of late-night American network TV programs =

Late-night television in the United States is the block of television programming intended for broadcast after 11:00 p.m. and usually through 2:00 a.m. Eastern and Pacific Time (ET/PT), but which informally can include programs aired as late as the designated overnight graveyard slot.

By definition, late night programming begins on the Big Three television networks (ABC, NBC and CBS) at or shortly before 11:35 p.m. ET/PT, after the conclusion of local late-evening newscasts on their owned-and-operated and affiliated stations; late night programming on other broadcast networks, including Fox and PBS, and cable television channels start at 11:00 p.m. ET/PT. Some streaming services (such as Netflix, Hulu and Amazon Prime Video) have ventured into the late-night talk format at various times in recent years, though these programs are in-format-only, given that episodes are often released before the start of the designated time period.

The following is a list of programs that are currently airing or have previously aired during the late night daypart on American television networks and streaming services.

== Current ==
Broadcast
Network	Program title	Format	Duration (Note: Total duration includes allocated commercial time, unless otherwise noted.)	Days	Time (ET)	Current host(s)/anchor(s)	Debut	Length of run
ABC	Jimmy Kimmel Live!	Talk show	60 minutes	Monday–Friday (Note: First-run episodes air Monday–Thursdays (except on certain major federal holidays) during weeks when the program is in production; Friday episodes typically reserved for reruns, although recorded first-run episodes occasionally air on certain Fridays.)	11:35 p.m.	Jimmy Kimmel	January 26, 2003	23 years, 292 days
ABC	Nightline	Newsmagazine	30 minutes	Monday–Friday	12:37 a.m.	Byron Pitts, Juju Chang (Note: Since November 2005, Nightline has maintained a rotating anchor format; presenters listed each solo anchor on assigned nights.)	March 24, 1980	46 years, 235 days
ABC	World News Now	Overnight newscast	90 minutes	Monday–Friday	2:30 a.m. (Note: Transmitted in a continuous tape delayed loop until 8:00 a.m. ET/PT for stations in westward time zones to air at accordant airtimes. Local airtimes may vary (usually to be joined in progress) depending on scheduling of late-night syndicated programs, network early-morning newscasts and, except where inapplicable, local morning newscasts as well as delays caused by overruns from network event programming.)	Andrew Dymburt, Rhiannon Ally	January 6, 1992	34 years, 312 days
CBS	Comics Unleashed with Byron Allen	Comedy panel	30 minutes x 2	Monday–Friday	11:35 p.m.	Byron Allen	September 22, 2025	1 year, 53 days
CBS	Funny You Should Ask	Comedy panel/game show	30 minutes x 2	Monday—Friday	12:37 p.m.	Jon Kelley	May 22, 2026	176 days
CBS	CBS News Roundup	Overnight newscast	60 minutes	Monday–Friday	2:00 a.m. (Note: CBS News Roundup is also broadcast on co-owned streaming network CBS News 24/7 starting at 1:00 a.m. ET, one hour before the loop feed is made available to local CBS stations and aired in partial simulcast with them.)	Jessi Mitchell	May 29, 2024	2 years, 169 days
NBC	Saturday Night Live	Sketch comedy	93 minutes	Saturday	11:30 p.m. (Note: Since 2017, Saturday Night Live is broadcast live across the contiguous United States and Alaska. Because the show airs outside of the safe harbor outside of the Eastern and Central Time Zones, a brief broadcast delay is implemented to meet FCC indecency regulations in the event that fleeting expletives or other objectionable material occur during the broadcast.)	Varies by week	October 11, 1975	51 years, 34 days
NBC	The Tonight Show Starring Jimmy Fallon	Talk show	60 minutes	Monday–Friday (Note: First-run episodes air Monday–Thursdays (except on certain major federal holidays) during weeks when the program is in production; Friday episodes are typically reserved for reruns year-round.)	11:35 p.m.	Jimmy Fallon	February 17, 2014	12 years, 270 days (Franchise: 72 years, 48 days)
NBC	Late Night with Seth Meyers	Talk show	60 minutes	Monday–Friday	12:37 a.m.	Seth Meyers	February 24, 2014	12 years, 263 days (Franchise: 44 years, 286 days)
NBC	Early Today	Overnight newscast (Note: On September 11, 2017, NBC began feeding Early Today to its owned and affiliated stations at 3:00 a.m. ET (since moved to 2:30 a.m. ET). The early morning newscast's shift to an earlier live feed—which replaced the second hour of the overnight block formerly branded as "NBC All Night" (then offering a same-day repeat of CNBC's Mad Money) and intended to accommodate expansions of local morning newscasts into the 4:00/4:30 a.m. slot in some markets—resulted in Early Today doubling as a de facto overnight newscast, of which NBC had not offered since the 1998 cancellation of NBC Nightside.)	90 minutes	Monday–Friday	2:30 a.m.	Nikki Battiste	September 9, 1999	27 years, 66 days
PBS	Amanpour & Company	World affairs; topical discussion	60 minutes (Note: Running time does not include commercials (note that certain listed cable networks maintain commercial-free programming formats and listed streaming services maintain ad-free tiers, and therefore the program length mentioned alongside this explanatory note is the total running time).)	Monday–Friday	11:00 p.m.	Christiane Amanpour	September 10, 2018	8 years, 65 days
Retro TV	Off-Beat Cinema	Midnight movie showcase	120 minutes	Saturday	2:00 a.m.	Constance Caldwell, Tony Billoni, Jeffrey Roberts	October 31, 1993	33 years, 14 days
Cable/satellite
Network	Program title	Format	Duration	Days	Time (ET)	Current host(s)	Debut	Length of run
Bravo	Watch What Happens Live with Andy Cohen	Talk show	22 minutes	Sunday–Thursday	10:00 p.m.	Andy Cohen	July 16, 2009	17 years, 121 days
Comedy Central	The Daily Show	News/political satire; talk show	30 minutes	Monday–Thursday	11:00 p.m.	Jon Stewart (Mondays), guest hosts (Tuesdays–Thursdays)	July 22, 1996	30 years, 115 days
Fox News	Gutfeld!	News/political satire; talk show	60 minutes	Monday–Friday	10:00 p.m.	Greg Gutfeld	May 31, 2015	11 years, 167 days
Fox News	Fox News Saturday Night	News/political satire; talk show	60 minutes	Saturday	11:00 p.m.	Jimmy Failla	June 3, 2023	3 years, 164 days
Fox News	Fox News @ Night	Current affairs; Political commentary	60 minutes	Monday–Friday	12:00 a.m.	Trace Gallagher	October 30, 2017	9 years, 15 days
HBO	Real Time with Bill Maher	News/political satire; talk show	60 minutes	Friday	10:00 p.m.	Bill Maher	February 21, 2003	23 years, 266 days
HBO	Last Week Tonight with John Oliver	News/political satire; talk show	~ 33 minutes	Sunday	11:00 p.m.	John Oliver	April 27, 2014	12 years, 201 days
Streaming
Service	Program title	Format	Duration	Release day	Time (ET)	Current host(s)	Debut	Length of run
Netflix	My Next Guest Needs No Introduction with David Letterman	Talk show	44–58 minutes	Friday	Streaming	David Letterman	January 12, 2018	8 years, 306 days
Netflix	Everybody's Live with John Mulaney	Talk show	57–59 minutes	Wednesday	10 p.m., Streaming	John Mulaney	March 12, 2025	1 year, 247 days

In keeping with the broadcast-night convention used for late-night television in the United States, programs beginning at or after midnight are listed under the previous day’s broadcast date.

Upcoming:

BET: Nick Cannon @ Night - October 20

== Past ==
=== Broadcast networks ===
==== ABC ====
- The Les Crane Show (November 9, 1964 – February 25, 1965) – interview/tabloid talk format with audience questions
  - ABC's Nightlife (March 1–November 12, 1965) – talk/variety series serving as a reformatting of The Les Crane Show; originally featured rotating hosts, before Crane returned as host in June 1965
- The Joey Bishop Show (April 17, 1967 – December 26, 1969)
- The Dick Cavett Show (December 29, 1969 – January 1, 1975)
- Wide World of Entertainment (January 8, 1973 – October 22, 1982, retitled ABC Late Night in January 1976) – originally a block of comedy/variety programs, talk shows hosted by Dick Cavett (The Dick Cavett Show) and Jack Paar (Jack Paar Tonite), documentaries and specials; reformatted as ABC Late Night in 1976, featuring reruns of ABC prime time shows (such as Soap, The Love Boat and Starsky & Hutch)
  - In Concert (November 24, 1972 – April 25, 1975) – aired Friday nights
  - Jack Paar Tonite (January 1973 – November 1973) - hosted by former NBC Tonight host Jack Paar
  - Comedy News (January 1973 – summer 1974) - satirical news program with an ensemble cast including Robert Klein, Mort Sahl, and Joan Rivers
  - Good Night America (1973 – 1975) – newsmagazine hosted by Geraldo Rivera
  - Fridays (April 11, 1980 – April 23, 1982) – sketch comedy series
- The Last Word (October 1982–April 1983) – hosted by Phil Donahue and Greg Jackson
- One on One (April–August 1983) – hosted by Greg Jackson
- Eye on Hollywood (August 1983–July 1986) – entertainment news/interview program
- ABC Rocks (June 22, 1984 – August 2, 1985) – music video program; aired Friday nights
- Lifestyles of the Rich and Famous (July – September 1986) – reality/documentary series, hosted by Robin Leach; aired simultaneously on ABC and in syndication
- The Dick Cavett Show (September 22 – December 30, 1986) – revival of his earlier ABC series, aired Tuesdays and Wednesdays
- Jimmy Breslin's People (September 1986 – January 1987) – aired Thursdays and Fridays
- Monday Sportsnite (June – August 1987) – sports discussion program; hosted by Al Trautwig; aired Monday nights
- Into the Night Starring Rick Dees (July 1990 – July 1991)
- ABC In Concert (June 7, 1991 – September 11, 1998) – second run on ABC, aired Friday nights
  - ABC In Concert Country (June 4 – August 10, 1994) – country music-focused spin-off; aired Saturday nights
- Politically Incorrect with Bill Maher (January 7, 1997 – July 15, 2002) – topical panel talk show; moved from Comedy Central
- Nightline Up Close (July 8, 2002 – January 24, 2003) – ABC News spin-off of Nightline, featuring one-on-one interviews conducted by Ted Koppel; temporary replacement for Politically Incorrect following cancellation due to Maher's comments about the perpetrators of the September 11 attacks
- The Alec Baldwin Show (March 4–December 29, 2018)
- Celebrity Family Feud (September 17, 2025 — September 22, 2025) - with Steve Harvey. ABC aired repeats of the prime-time game show while Jimmy Kimmel Live! was suspended due to the controversy over remarks made during Kimmel's monologue following the assassination of Charlie Kirk.

==== CBS ====
- The Faye Emerson Show (October 24, 1949 – June 22, 1951) – 15-minute chat show, began as an East Coast program before expanding to the full network, airing three nights a week, by March 1950; Emerson also concurrently hosted a show on NBC for several months in 1950.
- The Merv Griffin Show (August 18, 1969 – February 11, 1972)
- The CBS Late Movie (February 14, 1972 – September 20, 1985) – originally formatted as a weeknight movie showcase; began incorporating reruns of CBS series as well as some first-run British imported series during the block's timeslot in 1977
- CBS News Nightwatch (October 3, 1982 – March 27, 1992) – overnight topical discussion program; hosted by Harold Dow, Christopher Glenn, Karen Stone, Felicia Jeter, Mary Jo West (1982–84), Charlie Rose and Lark McCarthy (1984–90); various hosts were used from 1990 to 1992
- CBS Late Night (September 23, 1985 – January 6, 1989, October 30, 1989 – March 29, 1991) – reformatting of The CBS Late Movie block featuring reruns of CBS series, imported and first-run programs; block was replaced by The Pat Sajak Show in January 1989, and returned following the reduction of Sajak to an hour-long format (from 90 minutes)
  - Keep on Cruisin' (January – June 1987) – weekly variety series produced by Dick Clark; hosted by Stephen Bishop and Sinbad; aired Fridays
  - In Person from the Palace (June – August 1987) – weekly music series produced by Dick Clark, featuring taped concert performances from the Palace Theater in Hollywood; aired Fridays
  - Top of the Pops (September 1987 – March 1988) – music series based on the BBC pop music show; hosted by Nia Peeples; aired Fridays
  - Overtime... with Pat O'Brien (August 1990) – interview program; canceled after three episodes
  - The Midnight Hour (July – September 1990) – talk/variety show featuring rotating hosts (including comedienne Joy Behar, CBS This Morning weather anchor/co-host Mark McEwen, actor Marc Price, and satirist Bill Maher) and Patrice Rushen as bandleader
- The Pat Sajak Show (January 9, 1989 – April 13, 1990) – featured Dan Miller as announcer/sidekick and Tom Scott as bandleader; originally running for 90 minutes, for its second season, the talk show was reduced to 60 minutes and began utilizing guest hosts substituting for Sajak on Fridays (such as Paul Rodriguez and Rush Limbaugh)
- America Tonight (October 3, 1990 – March 28, 1991) – news and interview program produced by CBS News; hosted by Dan Rather, Charles Kuralt and Lesley Stahl
  - America Tonight Friday (October 7, 1990 – March 29, 1991) – Friday edition hosted by Robert Krulwich and Edie Magnus
- Crimetime After Primetime (April 1, 1991 – January 5, 1995) – weeknight showcase of first-run and Canadian-imported crime dramas
- Personals (September 1991 – December 1992) – dating game show in which a contestant would choose from three potential dates; the final round featured a series of yes or no questions for the winning couple, with a date destination that declined in quality each time their answers were incompatible (ranging from as high as an exotic location to as low as a trip to Pink's Hot Dogs' Los Angeles stand); hosted by Michael Burger
- Night Games (October 1991 – June 1992) – dating show in which three men and three women are asked questions containing sexual innuendo, with the winning contestant choosing whom he or she would take on a date; hosted by Jeff Marder, with Luann Lee as his announcer/assistant
- Up to the Minute (March 30, 1992 – September 18, 2015) – overnight newscast; replaced CBS News Nightwatch
- The Kids in the Hall (September 18, 1992 – January 6, 1995) – sketch comedy series, aired Fridays; moved from HBO
- The Late Show (August 30, 1993 – May 21, 2026)
  - Late Show with David Letterman (August 30, 1993 – May 20, 2015)
  - The Late Show with Stephen Colbert (September 8, 2015 – May 21, 2026)
- The Late Late Show (January 9, 1995 – April 27, 2023)
  - The Late Late Show with Tom Snyder (January 9, 1995 – March 26, 1999)
  - The Late Late Show with Craig Kilborn (March 29, 1999 – August 27, 2004)
  - The Late Late Show with Craig Ferguson (January 3, 2005 – December 19, 2014)
  - The Late Late Show with James Corden (March 23, 2015 – April 27, 2023)
- The Talk After Dark (January 12 – 16, 2015) – nighttime edition of CBS daytime program; temporary replacement for the Late Late Show during transition from Craig Ferguson to James Corden.
- CBS Summer Showcase (May 21 – September 7, 2015) – showcase of CBS drama reruns; temporary replacement for the Late Show during transition from David Letterman to Stephen Colbert as host.
- CBS Overnight News (September 21, 2015 – May 28, 2024) – overnight newscast; replaced Up to the Minute
- After Midnight (January 17, 2024 – June 13, 2025) - with Taylor Tomlinson. Comedy panel game show featuring comedians and celebrities competing for fictional prizes. Aired at 12:30 AM in the former Late Late Show slot following The Late Show with Stephen Colbert and produced by Colbert's production company.

==== NBC ====
- The Faye Emerson Show / Fifteen with Faye (April 15–August 1950) – 15-minute talk show
- Broadway Open House (May 29, 1950 – August 24, 1951) — comedy variety show featuring Jerry Lester, Morey Amsterdam (initially), and Dagmar
- Party Time at Club Roma (October 1950–January 1951) – variety show hosted by Ben Alexander, described as "part Truth or Consequences-type stunt show and part talent contest".
- Dagmar's Canteen (November 30, 1951 – June 14, 1952), continuation of Broadway Open House with a military theme in which Dagmar and service members would take part in sketches
- Mary Kay's Nightcap (June 1951–July 1952) – 15-minute sign-off show in which Mary Kay Stearns would preview NBC's schedule for the following day, with occasional interviews.
- The Tonight Show (September 27, 1954–present)
  - Tonight Starring Steve Allen (September 27, 1954 – January 25, 1957)
    - Tonight Starring Ernie Kovacs (October 1, 1956 – January 22, 1957), aired Monday and Tuesday nights to relieve Allen who was also hosting a weekly prime-time show, while Allen continued hosting Tonight Wednesdays through Fridays.
  - Tonight! America After Dark (January 28 — July 26, 1957)
  - Tonight Starring Jack Paar (July 29, 1957 – March 30, 1962)
  - The Tonight Show Starring Johnny Carson (October 1, 1962 – May 22, 1992)
  - The Tonight Show with Jay Leno (May 25, 1992 – May 29, 2009; March 1, 2010 – February 6, 2014)
  - The Tonight Show with Conan O'Brien (June 1, 2009 – January 22, 2010)
- The Burt Reynolds Late Show (October 13, 1973 — March 9, 1974) - a series of monthly 90-minute late night specials hosted by actor Burt Reynolds, filmed on location. Reynolds had planned to host six specials. The specials aired Saturday nights from 11:30 pm to 1 pm, pre-empting reruns of The Tonight Show Starring Johnny Carson. The specials included "Burt Reynolds at Leavenworth Penitentiary", spotlighting the musical talents of inmates, "Burt Reynolds in London", featuring Michael Caine, Edward Fox, Roger Moore, and Ryan O’Neal, "Burt and the Girls", featuring performances by eight women in show business, and "Burt Reynolds in Nashville", featuring country music singers and southern celebrities
- The Tomorrow Show (October 15, 1973 – December 17, 1981, retitled Tomorrow Coast to Coast in September 1980) – hosted by Tom Snyder and co-hosted by Rona Barrett from October 1980 until mid-1981; aired Monday–Thursday nights following The Tonight Show, with reruns continuing following its cancellation until January 28, 1982
- The Midnight Special (February 2, 1973 – May 1, 1981) – music series; aired Friday nights
- Weekend (October 20, 1974–December 1978) – NBC News newsmagazine hosted by Lloyd Dobyns, and co-hosted in its final year by Linda Ellerbee; aired about one week per month in lieu of Saturday Night Live reruns, before being moved to prime time until it ended in April 1979
- SCTV Network 90 (May 1981–March 1983) – Canadian sketch comedy series; aired Friday nights. Launched the American careers of John Candy, Martin Short, Catherine O'Hara, Eugene Levy, Andrea Martin, Rick Moranis, Dave Thomas, and Joe Flaherty.
- Late Night (February 1, 1982–present)
  - Late Night with David Letterman (February 1, 1982 – June 25, 1993)
  - Late Night with Conan O'Brien (September 13, 1993 – February 20, 2009)
  - Late Night with Jimmy Fallon (March 2, 2009 – February 7, 2014)
- NBC News Overnight (July 5, 1982 – December 3, 1983) – overnight news program; hosted by Lloyd Dobyns (later replaced by Bill Schechner) and Linda Ellerbee
- Friday Night Videos (July 29, 1983 – May 24, 2002, retitled Friday Night in 1994) – weekly series; originally formatted as a music video showcase, converted to a variety format in 1994
  - Late Friday (January 5, 2001 – May 24, 2002) – reformat of Friday Night focused on stand-up comedy routines
- Saturday Night's Main Event (May 11, 1985 – April 27, 1991) – World Wrestling Federation (WWF, now WWE) wrestling showcase; aired occasionally as filler in place of Saturday Night Live reruns
- Later (August 22, 1988 – January 18, 2001) – switched between one-on-one interview (1988–1994, 2000–2001) and conventional late-night talk/monologue formats (1994–2000) during its run; reruns of SCTV Network 90 aired under the Later banner for the latter's final year after its talk format was discontinued in January 2001.
  - Later with Bob Costas (August 22, 1988 – February 25, 1994)
  - Later with Greg Kinnear (February 28, 1994 – October 10, 1996)
  - Later (various hosts) (October 28, 1996 – January 27, 2000)
  - Later with Cynthia Garrett (January 31, 2000 – January 18, 2001)
- NBC Nightside (November 4, 1991 – September 20, 1998) – overnight newscast; produced by Charlotte-based video wire service NBC News Channel
- Poker After Dark (January 1, 2007 – September 23, 2011) – poker tournament program
- The Jay Leno Show (September 14, 2009 – February 9, 2010) - 10 p.m., weeknights. Similar format to Leno's Tonight Show with a monologue, interviews, and a number of the same recurring segments.
- Last Call with Carson Daly (January 8, 2002 – May 24, 2019) – originally maintained conventional late-night talk/comedy format; switched to on-location, documentary-style interview format in 2009
- A Little Late with Lilly Singh (September 16, 2019 – June 3, 2021) – replaced Last Call with Carson Daly in the 1:37 a.m. ET timeslot; format was a mixture of interviews, comedy sketches, and commentary "rants"

==== Fox ====
- The Late Show (October 9, 1986 – October 28, 1988)
  - The Late Show Starring Joan Rivers (October 9, 1986 – May 15, 1987)
  - The Late Show (various hosts) (May 18–December 8, 1987; January 11–October 28, 1988) Arsenio Hall's 13 weeks hosting the show in 1987 led to his being offered The Arsenio Hall Show by Paramount.
- The Wilton North Report (December 11, 1987 – January 8, 1988) – satirical newsmagazine/talk/variety show hosted by Phil Cowan and Paul Robins; aired as a temporary replacement for The Late Show
- Comic Strip Live (August 12, 1989 – January 15, 1994) – weekly stand-up comedy series; depending on the market, it aired on either Saturday or Sunday evening
- The Chevy Chase Show (September 7–October 1, 1993) – critically panned talk show cancelled after a five-week run, which became Fox's last regular weekday late night programming effort to date
- Saturday Night's Main Event (February 8–November 14, 1992) – weekly WWF wrestling showcase; moved from NBC
- Mad TV (October 14, 1995 – May 16, 2009) – sketch comedy series; aired Saturday nights
- Saturday Night Special (April 1–May 18, 1996) – sketch comedy/variety series, aired Saturday nights; produced by Roseanne Barr
- Talkshow with Spike Feresten (September 16, 2006 – May 16, 2009) – aired Saturday nights
- The Wanda Sykes Show (November 7, 2009 – April 24, 2010) – aired Saturday nights
- Animation Domination High-Def (July 21, 2013 – March 5, 2016) – weekly block of adult animated series; aired Saturday nights
- Party Over Here (March 12 – May 21, 2016) – sketch comedy series; aired Saturday nights
- FIFA World Cup on Fox After Hours with James Corden (June 11 - July 19, 2026) - nightly comedic recap of 2026 FIFA World Cup with James Corden, former England captain Rio Ferdinand and comedian Ian Karmel.

==== DuMont Television Network ====
- Monodrama Theater (May 1952–December 7, 1953) – variety series, aired Monday–Friday at 11:00 p.m. ET, featuring an actress or actor performing plays solo in front of a curtain in a form of monodrama
- The Ernie Kovacs Show (April 12, 1954 – April 7, 1955) – the DuMont version of the program aired Monday–Friday 11:15 p.m. to 12:15 a.m. ET, ending as the network began winding down operations; Kovacs moved to NBC and hosted the Tonight Show on Mondays and Tuesdays for one season

==== PBS ====
- Soul! (September 12, 1968 – March 7, 1973) – syndicated by WNDT–WNET/Newark–New York City
- Late Night America (January 4, 1982 – December 20, 1985; March 25–December 30, 1989) – talk and viewer call-in program hosted by Dennis Wholey; originally titled PBS LateNight from 1982 to 1984, formatted as a half-hour weeknight program (1982–1985) and later as a two-hour weekly show (1989); syndicated by WTVS/Detroit
- Charlie Rose (September 30, 1991 – November 17, 2017) – syndicated by WNET/Newark–New York City
- Charlie Rose: The Week (July 19, 2013 – November 24, 2017) – "week-in-review" program featuring interviews from Charlie Rose, and news and cultural summaries; aired Fridays, and syndicated by WNET/Newark–New York City
- Tavis Smiley (January 5, 2004 – December 13, 2017) – syndicated by KCET/Los Angeles (2004–2011) and WNET/Newark–New York City (2011–2017)
- Amanpour on PBS (December 11, 2017 – September 7, 2018) – repurposed version of Christiane Amanpour's CNN International world affairs interview program; syndicated by WNET/Newark–New York City
- Beyond 100 Days (January 2–September 6, 2018) – rebroadcast of BBC World News world affairs newscast primarily covering the early days of the first Donald Trump presidency; syndicated by KCET/Los Angeles
- BBC World News on PBS (January 12–September 7, 2018) – late night international newscast; syndicated by KCET/Los Angeles
- Amanpour & Company (September 10, 2018 – December 2026; soon) – syndicated by WNET/Newark–New York City

==== Telemundo ====
- A Oscuras Pero Encendidos (2000–2001) – hosted by Paul Bouche; moved from Galavisión
- Mas Vale Tarde (November 2007–April 2008) – hosted by Alex Cambert

==== Telefutura/UniMás ====
- Noche de Perros (October 31, 2011 – April 20, 2012)

==== United Network ====
- The Las Vegas Show (May 1–June 5, 1967) – variety show starring Bill Dana

=== Syndication ===
This list does not include the numerous game shows aired during the mid-1980s that often received late-night clearances (such as the 1985 run of The Nighttime Price Is Right) but were not expressly intended for late night audiences, nor does it include talk shows meant for daytime broadcast that air in late night slots in many markets due to either low ratings in their original timeslot, a lack of an available prime daytime slot or as a secondary run.

- Night Train (WLAC-TV/Nashville, October 1964—1968), first nationally syndicated R&B show to feature an all-Black cast. Hosted and produced by Noble Blackwell. Aired late Friday nights and featured performers such as James Brown, Joe Tex, BB King, Jimi Hendrix, Gladys Knight, Otis Redding, and Jackie Shane. Produced by WLAC-TV in Nashville. Production ended in 1966. Originally a local program, 26 episodes were syndicated by Seven Arts Television, mostly in the southeastern United States with repeats airing until 1968.
- The Steve Allen Show (April 1968–November 1969) – a revival of Allen's original Tonight format; syndicated by Filmways
- Don Kirshner's Rock Concert (September 27, 1973 – 1981) – music program
- Mary Hartman, Mary Hartman (January 5, 1976 – July 1, 1977; reruns continuing until 1978) – soap opera parody produced by Norman Lear
- All That Glitters (April 18–July 15, 1977) – soap opera parody produced by Norman Lear
- Fernwood 2 Night (July 4–September 30, 1977) – talk show parody starring Martin Mull and Fred Willard; spin-off of Mary Hartman, Mary Hartman
  - America 2-Night (April 10–July 7, 1978) – continuation series/spinoff of Fernwood 2 Night
- The Love Experts (September 18, 1978 – September 7, 1979) – dating game show hosted by Bill Cullen
- The Uncle Floyd Show (1980–1998) – hosted by Floyd Vivino; regionally distributed in the northeastern United States
- The George Michael Sports Machine (September 2, 1984 – March 25, 2007) – Sunday night sports highlight and interview show hosted by sportscaster George Michael; syndicated by ITC Entertainment (1984–95), Group W Productions (and successors Eyemark Entertainment and King World Productions, 1995–2001), and NBC Enterprises/NBCUniversal Television Distribution (2001–07)
- Almost Live! (September 23, 1984 – May 22, 1999) – weekly sketch comedy/variety series from KING-TV in Seattle; was briefly syndicated in the early 1990s
- Nightlife (September 8, 1986 – June 19, 1987) – hosted by David Brenner; syndicated by King World
- Ask Dr Ruth (January 1987) – sex advice talk show hosted by sex therapist Dr. Ruth Westheimer and Larry Angelo
- Sunday Night (in the second season retitled Night Music) (1988–1990) – weekly music showcase for jazz and eclectic artists; syndicated by Broadway Video
- The Arsenio Hall Show (January 3, 1989 – May 27, 1994, September 9, 2013 – May 21, 2014) – syndicated by Paramount Domestic Television (original run) and CBS Television Distribution (revival)
- The Byron Allen Show (1989–1992) – originally formatted as an hour-long weekly program, converted to a half-hour weeknight format in 1992; syndicated by Genesis Entertainment
- The Howard Stern Show (July 1990–August 1992) – syndicated by All American Television
- My Talk Show (September 1990–March 1991) – talk show parody; syndicated by MCA Television
- The Party Machine with Nia Peeples (January 7–September 15, 1991) – musical variety show; syndicated by Paramount Domestic Television
- The Ron Reagan Show (August 1991) – political talk show; syndicated by MCA Television
- The Dennis Miller Show (January 20–September 1992) – following its cancellation, new episodes aired until July 24, 1992; syndicated by Tribune Entertainment
- The Whoopi Goldberg Show (September 1992–September 1993) – syndicated by Genesis Entertainment
- The Jon Stewart Show (September 12, 1994 – June 23, 1995) – Season 1 originated on MTV; season 2 was syndicated by Paramount Domestic Television
- Last Call (September 12, 1994–September 1995) – discussion show featuring five panelists (which included, among others, John Melendez and Brianne Leary), syndicated by MCA Television
- The Newz (September 12, 1994–March 1995) – sketch comedy series; syndicated by Columbia Pictures Television Distribution
- Lauren Hutton and... (September 1995–May 1996) – syndicated by Turner Original Productions
- Night Stand with Dick Dietrick (September 16, 1995–September 1997) – weekly tabloid talk show parody starring Timothy Stack; syndicated by Worldvision Enterprises
- Kwik Witz (September 20, 1996 – September 1, 1999) – weekly improvisational comedy series; syndicated by Beau & Arrow Productions and Hearst Entertainment
- The Keenen Ivory Wayans Show (August 4, 1997–March 1998) – syndicated by Buena Vista Television
- Vibe (August 4, 1997 – April 17, 1998) – hosted by Chris Spencer until October 1997, and then Sinbad until the series' cancellation; syndicated by Columbia TriStar Television
- The Michael Essany Show (1997–2004) – originally aired on public-access television, then expanded to include a cable telecast on E! for two seasons
- The Magic Hour (June 8–September 4, 1998) – hosted by Magic Johnson; syndicated by 20th Television
- Comics Unleashed with Byron Allen (September 2006–September 2007, 2014; reruns aired on CBS owned-and-operated stations until 2025) – syndicated by Entertainment Studios (now Allen Media Group Television); repeats and some previously unaired episodes aired on the full CBS network from 2023 to 2024 as a temporary replacement for The Late Late Show during the transition to its timeslot successor After Midnight. The show returned to the full CBS network in September 2025 following the cancellation of After Midnight.
- The Edge with Jake Sasseville (February 16–May 17, 2008)
- Late Night Republic with Jake Sasseville (2009–2011)
- The Brian McKnight Show (2009–2010)
- The Kilborn File (June 28–August 6, 2010) – hosted by Craig Kilborn; syndicated by 20th Television; aired as a six-week test run on Fox owned-and-operated stations
- Live from Daryl's House (2011–2025) – online music performance series hosted by Daryl Hall; aired as periodic specials syndicated to local television stations as well as cable networks like RFD TV and MTV Live

==== Metromedia ====
- The Merv Griffin Show (February 14, 1972 – September 5, 1986) – King World assumed syndication rights in 1984, although the show continued to be carried on Metromedia-owned stations until shortly after the group's sale to Fox/News Corporation in 1986. Canceled due to Fox launching The Late Show with Joan Rivers.
- Thicke of the Night (September 5, 1983 – June 15, 1984) – hosted by Alan Thicke; aired on Metromedia-owned stations and syndicated by MGM/UA Television to other markets
- The Jerry Lewis Show (June 18–22, 1984) – aired as a one-week trial run following Thicke of the Night's cancellation

==== Westinghouse Broadcasting (Group W) ====
Programs syndicated by Group W Productions aired on Westinghouse-owned stations and were syndicated to other markets; merged with CBS in 1996 to become Eyemark Entertainment, and folded into King World in 2000 by CBS.

- PM East (with Mike Wallace and Joyce Davidson)/PM West (with Terrence O'Flaherty) (1961–1962)
- The Steve Allen Show (July 1962–October 1964) – a revival of Allen's original Tonight format; unofficially known as "The Steve Allen Westinghouse Show" or "The Steve Allen Playhouse" (in reference to the renamed theater that served as its taping location) to distinguish it from the prime time show of the same name
- That Regis Philbin Show! (1964–1965)
- The Merv Griffin Show (May 10, 1965 – August 15, 1969)
- The David Frost Show (1969–1972)
- The Howard Stern Radio Show (August 22, 1998 – May 19, 2001) – distributed by Group W successor Eyemark Entertainment

=== Local television ===
- Almost Live! (KING-TV/Seattle, September 23, 1984 – May 22, 1999) – weekly sketch comedy/variety series; aired as a local program for most of its run
- A Oscuras Pero Encendidos (WJAN-CA/Miami, 1995–1997) – hosted by Paul Bouche; moved to Galavisión in 1997 and finally to Telemundo in 2000
- Man of the People with Pat Tomasulo (WGN-TV/Chicago, January 2018–July 2019) – weekly series
- Talk Tonight (KTSF/San Francisco, February 13, 2006 – December 27, 2019) – weekly series
- The Nite Show with Danny Cashman (WABI-DT2 1997—1999, WSBK-TV 2001—2002, WABI-TV/Bangor, Maine, October 2010—May 17, 2025), aired late Saturday nights. Original version of show aired on Bangor's WB affiliate and then on its UPN outlet. Final version syndicated throughout Maine. Final guest was David Letterman.

=== Cable/satellite ===
==== AMC ====
- Geeking Out (July 24–October 3, 2016) – pop culture comedy talk show hosted by Kevin Smith and Greg Grunberg
- Talking Bad (August 11–September 29, 2013) – live aftershow discussing episodes of the AMC scripted drama Breaking Bad, hosted by Chris Hardwick
- Talking Saul (February 15, 2016 – August 8, 2022) – live aftershow discussing episodes of the AMC scripted drama Better Call Saul (during seasons 2–3 and 6), hosted by Chris Hardwick
- Talking with Chris Hardwick (2017–2018)
- Friday Night in with the Morgans (2020)

==== Adult Swim ====
- Hot Package (October 4, 2013 – 2015)
- The Eric Andre Show (May 20, 2012 – July 2, 2023)

==== BBC America ====
- The Nerdist (2011-2013)

==== BET ====
- The Mo'Nique Show (October 5, 2009 – August 16, 2011)
- Don't Sleep! hosted by TJ Holmes (2012)
- The Rundown with Robin Thede (October 12, 2017 – April 19, 2018)

==== Biography Channel ====
- Shatner's Raw Nerve (2008–2011)

==== Bravo ====
- Kathy (April 19, 2012 – March 28, 2013) – hosted by Kathy Griffin
- Bravo's Chat Room (2020–2021)

==== CMT ====
- The Josh Wolf Show (June–July 2015)

==== CNN ====
- D. L. Hughley Breaks the News (2008–2009)

==== Comedy Central ====
- The Daily Show (July 22, 1996–present)
  - The Daily Show with Craig Kilborn (July 22, 1996 – December 17, 1998)
  - The Daily Show with Jon Stewart (January 11, 1999 – August 6, 2015)
  - The Daily Show with Trevor Noah (September 28, 2015 – December 8, 2022)
- Night After Night with Allan Havey (1989-1992)
- Politically Incorrect with Bill Maher (July 25, 1993 – November 5, 1996) – topical panel talk show; subsequently moved to ABC, where it continued until September 2002
- The Chris Wylde Show Starring Chris Wylde (August–October 2001)
- Tough Crowd with Colin Quinn (December 9, 2002 – November 4, 2004)
- Insomniac with Dave Attell (August 5, 2001 – November 11, 2004)
- Too Late with Adam Carolla (August 8–November 17, 2005)
- Weekends at the D.L. (July 2005–January 2006) – hosted by D. L. Hughley
- The Colbert Report (October 17, 2005 – December 18, 2014)
- Chocolate News (October 15–December 17, 2008) – news satire program hosted by David Alan Grier
- The Jeff Dunham Show (October 22–December 10, 2009)
- The Benson Interruption (November 5–December 17, 2010) – stand-up comedy program hosted by Doug Benson
- Sports Show with Norm Macdonald (April 12–June 7, 2011) – sports news satire program
- Gabriel Iglesias Presents Stand Up Revolution (October 6, 2011 – November 8, 2014) – stand-up comedy program
- The Jeselnik Offensive (February 19–August 27, 2013)
- @midnight with Chris Hardwick (October 21, 2013 – August 4, 2017) – viral video panel game show; rebooted in January 2024 as After Midnight on CBS
- Adam Devine's House Party (October 2013–May 2016)
- Comedy Underground with Dave Attell (April 12–May 31, 2014)
- The Meltdown with Jonah and Kumail (July 24, 2014 – November 22, 2016) – stand-up comedy program hosted Jonah Ray and Kumail Nanjiani
- The Nightly Show with Larry Wilmore (January 19, 2015 – August 18, 2016) – news satire talk show
- Why? with Hannibal Buress (July 8–August 26, 2015)
- Not Safe with Nikki Glaser (February 9–August 9, 2016)
- The Gorburger Show (April 9–June 4, 2017) – talk show parody hosted by T.J. Miller
- The High Court with Doug Benson (February 28–March 24, 2017) – comedy court show
- Problematic with Moshe Kasher (April 18–June 6, 2017)
- The Opposition with Jordan Klepper (September 25, 2017 – June 28, 2018)
- The Jim Jefferies Show (June 6, 2017 – November 19, 2019)
- The President Show (2017)
- Taskmaster (2018)
- Good Talk with Anthony Jeselnik (2019)
- Klepper (2019)
- Lights Out with David Spade (2019–2020)
- Hell of a Week with Charlamagne tha God (2021–2022)
- Doing the Most with Phoebe Robinson (2021)

==== Discovery Channel ====
- Josh Gates Tonight (2020–2022)

==== E! ====
- The Howard Stern Radio Show (November 27, 1992 – July 8, 2005)
  - The Howard Stern Interview (November 27, 1992–October 1993)
  - Howard Stern (June 18, 1994 – July 8, 2005)
- Chelsea Lately (July 16, 2007 – August 26, 2014) – hosted by Chelsea Handler
- Love You, Mean It with Whitney Cummings (2012-2013)
- Hello Ross (September 6, 2013 – May 16, 2014) – hosted by Ross Mathews
- The Grace Helbig Show (April 3–June 7, 2015)
- We Have Issues (September 18–October 9, 2015) – weekly pop culture comedy series hosted by Julian McCullough and Annie Lederman
- Busy Tonight (October 28, 2018 – May 16, 2019) – hosted by Busy Philipps
- Ladygang (2018 - 2019)

==== Freeform ====
- Truth & Iliza (May 2–June 6, 2017) – hosted by Iliza Schlesinger

==== Fox News ====
- Red Eye (February 6, 2007 – April 7, 2017)
- The Greg Gutfeld Show (May 31, 2015 – March 13, 2021)

==== Foxnet ====
- The Spud Goodman Show (1995–1998)

==== Fuse ====
- White Guy Talk Show (March–May 2015) – pop culture comedy talk show hosted by Saurin Choksi and Grace Parra

==== Fusion TV ====
- The Chris Gethard Show (May 28, 2015 – June 1, 2016) – phone-in comedy/variety talk show; originally a local program on the Manhattan Neighborhood Network in the New York City area from 2011 to 2015, moved to truTV in 2017
- No, You Shut Up! (November 1, 2013 – March 17, 2016) – live-action/puppet parody panel debate show hosted by Paul F. Tompkins

==== FX ====
- Brand X with Russell Brand (June 28, 2012 – May 2, 2013)
- Totally Biased with W. Kamau Bell (August 9, 2012 – June 20, 2013)

==== FXX ====
- Totally Biased with W. Kamau Bell (September 4–November 14, 2013; moved from FX)

==== Galavisión ====
- A Oscuras Pero Encendidos (1997–2000) – hosted by Paul Bouche; moved to Telemundo in 2000

==== G4TechTV ====
- Unscrewed with Martin Sargent (May–November 2004; carried over from TechTV)

==== HBO ====
- Def Comedy Jam (July 1, 1992 – May 2, 1997) – stand-up comedy program
- Dennis Miller Live (April 22, 1994 – August 30, 2002)
- Mr. Show with Bob and David (November 3, 1995 – December 28, 1998) – sketch comedy series starring Bob Odenkirk and David Cross
- The Chris Rock Show (February 7, 1997 – November 25, 2000)
- Reverb (April 13, 1997 – November 28, 2001) – weekly music program
- Def Poetry Jam (December 14, 2001 – February 7, 2007) – spoken word poetry program hosted by Mos Def
- Da Ali G Show (February 21, 2003 – August 22, 2004) – satirical comedy talk show starring Sacha Baron Cohen
- 2 Dope Queens (2018–2019)
- A Black Lady Sketch Show (2019–2023)
- How To with John Wilson (2020–2023)
- Pause with Sam Jay (2021–2022)

==== History ====
- Join or Die with Craig Ferguson (February 18–July 28, 2016)

==== IFC ====
- The Henry Rollins Show (2006–2007)
- Baroness Von Sketch Show (2017–2021), all-female comedy series produced by CBC Television

==== Lifetime ====
- The Conversation with Amanda De Cadenet (2012)
- Undone with Amanda De Cadenet (2014)

==== MSNBC ====
- Up Late with Alec Baldwin (October 11–November 8, 2013)

==== MTV ====
- The Jon Stewart Show (October 25, 1993–August 1994)
- Oddville, MTV (June 1997 – 1999)
- The New Tom Green Show (June 23–September 5, 2003)
- Nikki & Sara Live (January 29–October 29, 2013) – hosted by Nikki Glaser and Sara Schaefer
- The Show with Vinny (2013)
- Middle of the Night Show (October 8–December 10, 2015)

==== MTV2 ====
- Charlamagne and Friends (2013–2014)
- Uncommon Sense with Charlamagne (2015–2017)

==== National Geographic ====
- StarTalk (April 20, 2015 – May 16, 2019)

==== Showtime ====
- Inside Comedy (January 26, 2012 – June 9, 2015) – interview program hosted by David Steinberg
- Desus & Mero (February 21, 2019 – June 23, 2022) – hosted by Desus Nice and The Kid Mero
- Ziwe (2021-2022)

==== Sundance TV ====
- The Writers' Room (July 29, 2013 – June 2, 2014) – documentary series hosted by Jim Rash

==== TBS ====
- Frank TV (2007-2008)
- Lopez Tonight (November 9, 2009 – August 12, 2011), hosted by George Lopez
- Conan (November 8, 2010 – June 24, 2021), hosted by Conan O'Brien
- Deon Cole's Black Box (June 10–July 15, 2013) – comedic viral video commentary series
- The Pete Holmes Show (October 28, 2013 – June 18, 2014)
- Full Frontal with Samantha Bee (February 8, 2016 – June 23, 2022) – news satire show with Samantha Bee

==== TechTV ====
- Unscrewed with Martin Sargent (May 2003–May 2004)

==== TLC ====
- Fashionably Late with Stacy London (November 23–December 28, 2007)
- Late Night Joy (November 4–29, 2015) – hosted by Joy Behar

==== The Nashville Network ====
- Nashville Now (March 7, 1983 – October 15, 1993) – hosted by Ralph Emery
- Music City Tonight (1993–1996) – hosted by Lorianne Crook and Charlie Chase

==== TV Land ====
- ALF's Hit Talk Show (July 7–December 17, 2004)
- Throwing Shade (January 17–March 28, 2017) – weekly television version of the comedy discussion podcast, hosted by Erin Gibson and Bryan Safi

==== TV One ====
- Donnie After Dark (February–December 2016) – talk show hosted by Donnie Simpson

==== TruTV ====
- The Chris Gethard Show (August 3, 2017 – May 29, 2018) – phone-in comedy/variety talk show; moved from Fusion

==== USA Network ====
- USA Up All Night (January 1989–March 1998) – B movie showcase; hosted by Gilbert Gottfried and, for much of its run, Rhonda Shear; title remained in use after the program's cancellation as an umbrella title for USA's late-night movie presentations until 2002

==== VH1 ====
- Late World with Zach (March–May 2002)
- The Jenny McCarthy Show (2013)
- VH1 Live! (July–September 2016)

==== Viceland ====
- Desus & Mero (October 2016–June 2018)

=== Streaming services ===
==== Amazon Video ====
- The Goodnight Show with Michael Essany (August 4, 2017) – three episodes released

==== Apple TV+ ====
- The Problem with Jon Stewart (September 30, 2021 – April 5, 2023)

==== HBO Max/Max ====
- The Not Too Late Show with Elmo (May 27, 2020 – December 30, 2021)

==== Hulu ====
- I Love You, America with Sarah Silverman (October 2017–November 2018)

==== Netflix ====
- Chelsea (May 11, 2016 – December 15, 2017)
- Bill Nye Saves the World (2017–2018)
- The Joel McHale Show with Joel McHale (February 18–July 15, 2018)
- Norm Macdonald Has a Show (September 14, 2018)
- The Break with Michelle Wolf (May 27–July 29, 2018)
- Patriot Act with Hasan Minhaj (October 28, 2018 – June 28, 2020)
- That's My Time with David Letterman (2022)
- John Mulaney Presents: Everybody's in LA (May 3–10, 2024)

==== Peacock ====
- Wilmore (September 18–December 4, 2020) – interview and news satire talk show hosted by Larry Wilmore
- The Amber Ruffin Show (September 25, 2020 – December 16, 2022)

== See also ==
- List of American late night talk show hosts
