= List of American late night talk show hosts =

This is a list of late-night talk show hosts in America.

Host	Shows
Morey Amsterdam	Broadway Open House (May 29, 1950 – 1950)
Jerry Lester	Broadway Open House (May 30, 1950 – May, 1951)
Jennie "Dagmar" Lewis	Broadway Open House (1950 – Aug 24, 1951), Dagmar's Canteen (1952)
Mary Kay Stearns	Mary Kay's Nightcap (1951 – 1952)
Steve Allen	Tonight Starring Steve Allen (Sep 27, 1954 – Jan 25, 1957), The Steve Allen Show (Jun 24, 1957 – Jun 1964), The Steve Allen Comedy Hour (1967)
Ernie Kovacs	Tonight Starring Steve Allen (Oct 1, 1956 – Jan 22, 1957)
Jack Lescoulie	Tonight! America After Dark (Jan 28, 1957 – Jun 21, 1957)
Al "Jazzbo" Collins	Tonight! America After Dark (Jun 24 1957 – Jul 26, 1957)
Jack Paar	Tonight Starring Jack Paar (Jul 29 1957 – Mar 30 1962)
Art Linkletter	The Tonight Show (Apr 2 1962 – Apr 27,1962)
Merv Griffin	The Tonight Show (Apr 30, 1962 – May 25, 1962), The Merv Griffin Show (Oct 1, 1962 – Jun 6, 1986)
Hugh Downs	The Tonight Show (May 28, 1962 – Jun 8, 1962)
Joey Bishop	The Tonight Show (Jun 11, 1962 – Jun 22, 1962), The Joey Bishop Show (Apr 17, 1967 – Dec 26, 1969)
Bob Cummings	The Tonight Show (Jun 25, 1962 – Jun 29, 1962)
Jack Carter	The Tonight Show (Jul 2, 1962 – Jul 6, 1962)
Jan Murray	The Tonight Show (Jul 9, 1962 – Jul 13, 1962)
Peter Lind Hayes	The Tonight Show (Jul 16, 1962 – Jul 20, 1962)
Soupy Sales	The Tonight Show (Jul 23, 1962 – Jul 27, 1962)
Mort Sahl	The Tonight Show (Jul 30, 1962 – Aug 3, 1962)
Steve Lawrence	The Tonight Show (Aug 6, 1962 – Aug 10, 1962)
Jerry Lewis	The Tonight Show (Aug 13, 1962 – Aug 17, 1962)
Jimmy Dean	The Tonight Show (Aug 20, 1962 – Aug 25, 1962)
Arlene Francis	The Tonight Show (Aug 28, 1962 – Aug 31, 1962)
Jack E. Leonard	The Tonight Show (Sep 3, 1962 – Sep 8, 1962)
Groucho Marx	The Tonight Show (Sep 10, 1962 – Sep 15, 1962)
Hal March	The Tonight Show (Sep 17, 1962 – Sep 21, 1962)
Donald O'Connor	The Tonight Show (Sep 23, 1962 – Sep 27, 1962)
Johnny Carson	The Tonight Show Starring Johnny Carson (Oct 1, 1962 – May 22, 1992)
Dick Cavett	The Dick Cavett Show (Mar 4, 1968 – Dec 30, 1986)
Jay Leno	The Tonight Show with Jay Leno (May 25, 1992 – May 29, 2009; Mar 1, 2010 – Feb 6, 2014)
David Letterman	Late Show with David Letterman (Aug 30, 1993 – May 20, 2015)
Jimmy Kimmel	Jimmy Kimmel Live! (Jan 26, 2003 – present)
Conan O'Brien	The Tonight Show with Conan O'Brien (Jun 1, 2009 – Jan 22, 2010)
Jimmy Fallon	The Tonight Show Starring Jimmy Fallon (Feb 17, 2014 – present)
Seth Meyers	Late Night with Seth Meyers (Feb 24, 2014 – present)
John Oliver	Last Week Tonight with John Oliver (Apr 27, 2014 – present)
James Corden	The Late Late Show with James Corden (Mar 23, 2015 – Apr 27, 2023)
Stephen Colbert	The Late Show with Stephen Colbert (Sep 8, 2015 – May 21, 2026)

== See also ==
- List of late-night American network TV programs
