= Chevrolet El Morocco =

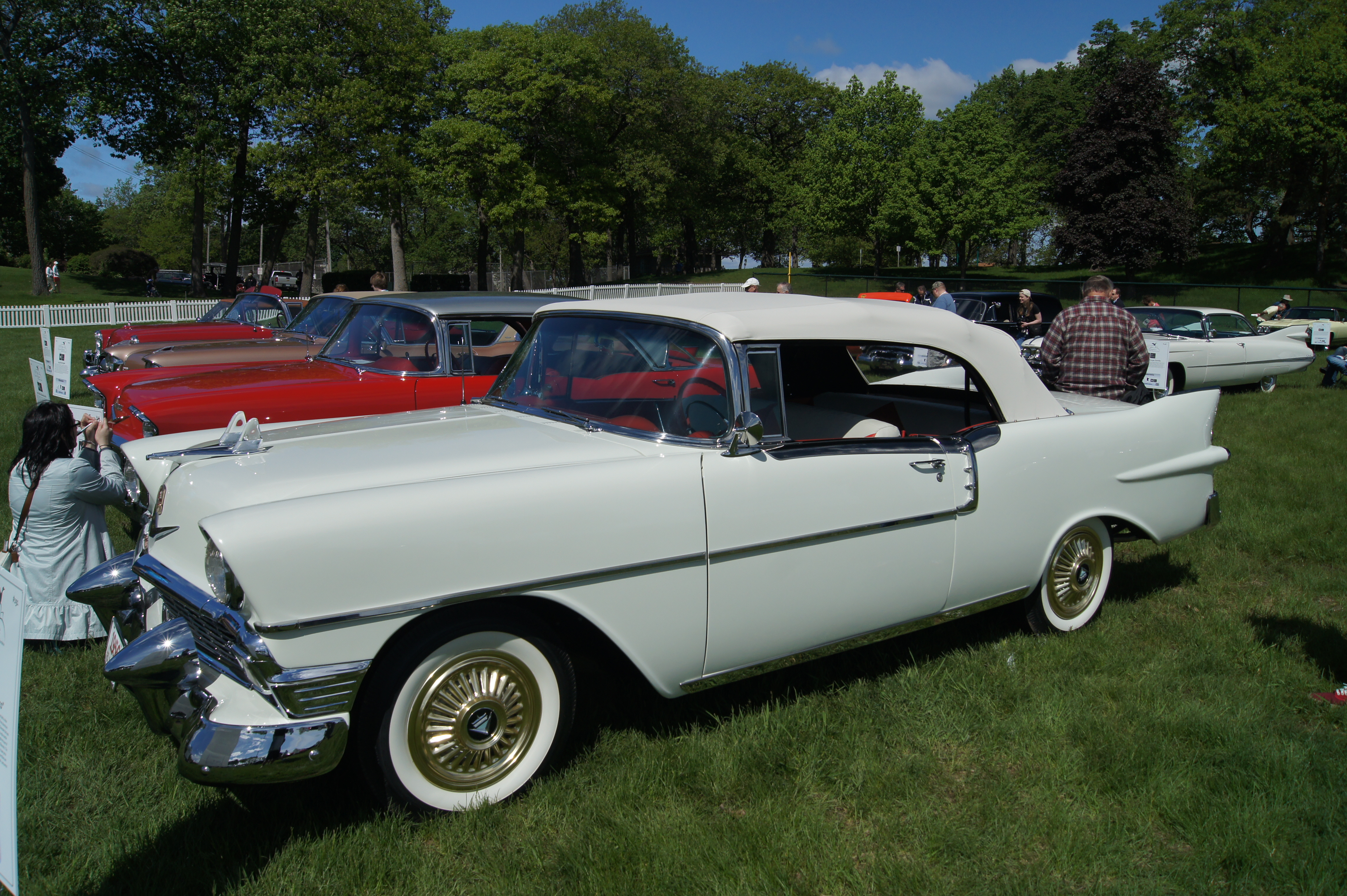
1956 Chevrolet El Morocco

The Chevrolet El Morocco was a customized full-size car produced by Canadian businessman Reuben Allender based on the 1956 and 1957 Chevrolet. The relationship with Chevrolet began with Allender, a wealthy businessman who had built a business in the surplus textile industry and had a dream of building his own car. He was a long-time buyer of Cadillacs, with the ambition to build a smaller, lighter car that would be styled after them.

== History ==
Impressed by his 1955 Cadillac Eldorado, Allender felt that he could recreate its elegance and prestige, but lower the price by basing his dream car on the contemporary Chevrolet Bel Air. He originally chose the 1955 Bel Air as the basis for his project, but work did not begin until 1956. The first-year El Morocco was based on the 1956 Bel Air Sport Coupe and Convertible. Looking for a name that sounded like "Eldorado", but not wanting to get into trouble from Cadillac, he chose "El Morocco," named after a popular Manhattan nightclub. He managed to get the brand legally registered, so all El Moroccos were licensed as such, not as Chevrolets.

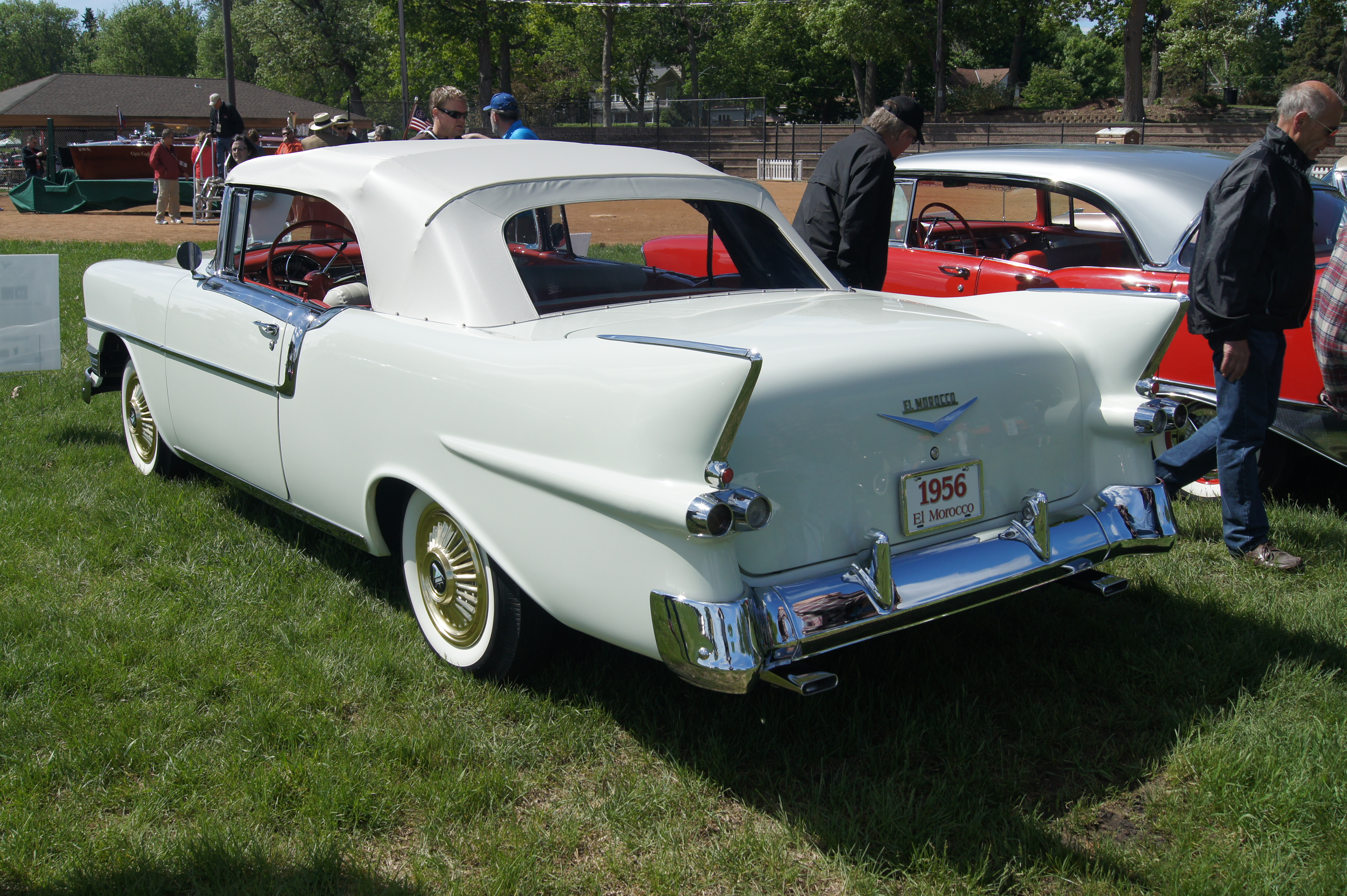
1956 Chevrolet El Morocco rear view

=== Design ===
Allender bolted and epoxied Eldorado-style fibreglass tailfins to the rear deck and used side moldings borrowed from the Eldorado. On the front, he modified the grille by removing the Chevy crest while retaining the "V" emblem on the hood. He also added large Dagmar front bumper guards. DeSoto-style "Sabre-Spoke" gold anodized wheel covers were modified with a custom El Morocco "V" emblem.

For 1957, Allender offered a new El Morocco based on the 1957 Chevrolet Two-Ten Sport Coupe, Sport Sedan, and the Bel Air convertible. He removed the Chevy grille and replaced it with an aluminum egg crate insert. The "Chevrolet" lettering was replaced with El Morocco badges on the front and rear in block letters just over the "V." At the rear, the '57 El Morocco sported metal Eldorado-style rear fins welded to the rear quarters in the wake of a shortage of skilled fibreglass workers. Bright side "scoop" moldings on the rear quarter panels gave the car more of a resemblance to the $13,000 Cadillac Eldorado Brougham.

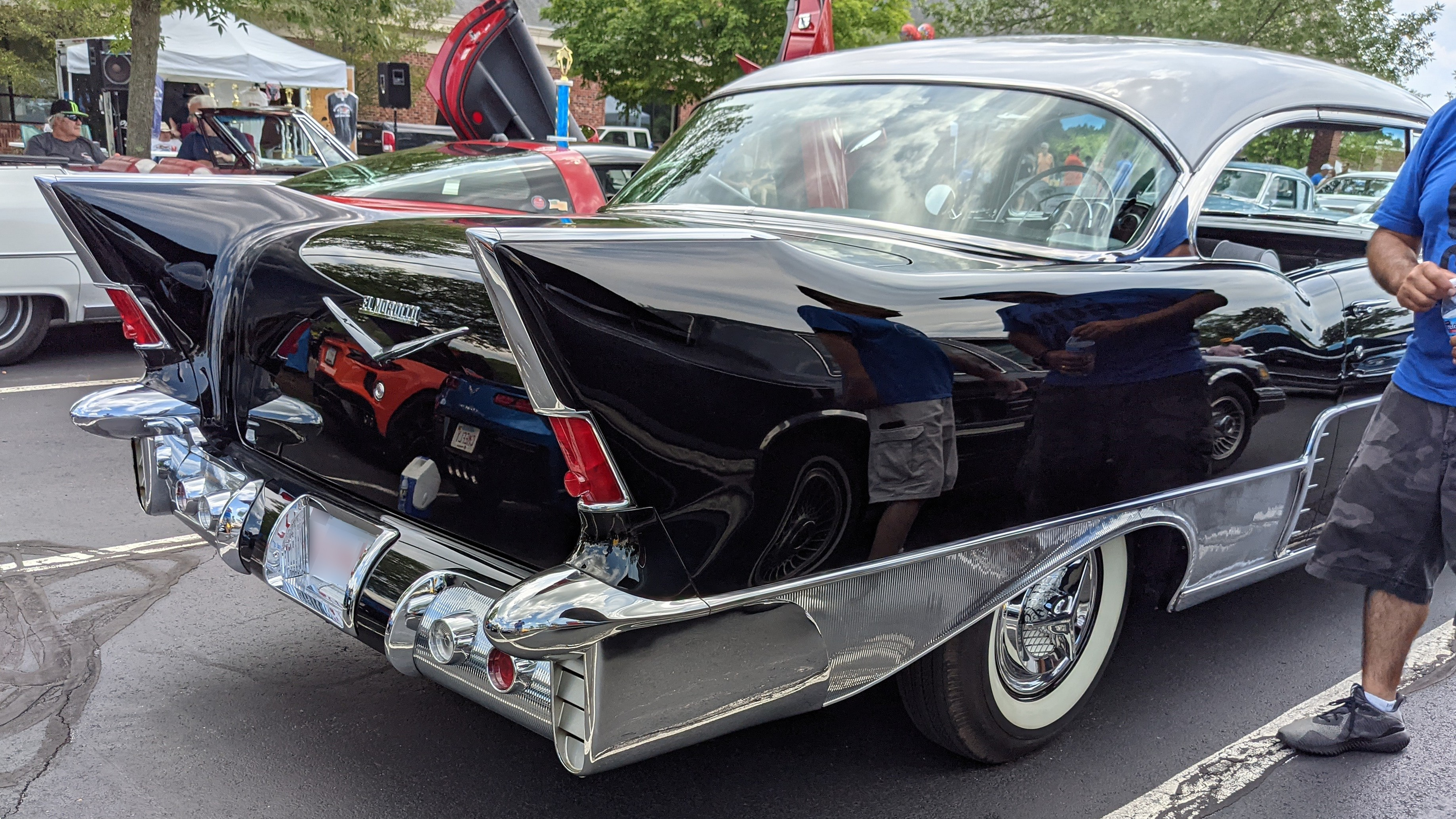
1957 El Morocco rear quarter

Allender's cars were at their core customized Chevrolets, albeit hand-built ones. Allender used stock parts where possible; for example, the Dagmar bumper elements were reversed 1937 Dodge headlight pods, whereas the taillights were 1955 Dodge units. A Frazer horn button served as a front medallion, and "saddle" pieces on the front door came from dash padding on a Willys. Drivetrains for all El Moroccos were strictly stock Chevrolet units. Standard was the Chevrolet small-block V8 with a four-barrel carburetor and Powerglide automatic transmission.

=== Sales ===
It is likely that even though the El Morocco cost significantly less than a Cadillac, it was still pricey for a Chevrolet, which would explain the small demand for the car. The primary reason for its low production numbers was the conversion price, which moved it too far out of reach for most consumers. It was too close to the base price for a Cadillac, plus it is believed that a profit was never made on the El Morocco. Allender sold between 10 and 20 El Moroccos in 1956 and 1957; ten hardtop sedans, two hardtop coupes, and two convertibles are known to have been created in 1957. Each car sold for approximately $1,000 more than an equivalent Bel Air.

Today, the El Morocco is a valuable collector's car, with one selling for $181,500 in 2016. Another pair from a trio offered at Mecum's Kissimmee auction on January 16, 2021, sold for $165,000 & $220,000 respectively, while the third received a highest bid of $195,000 but was not sold immediately.

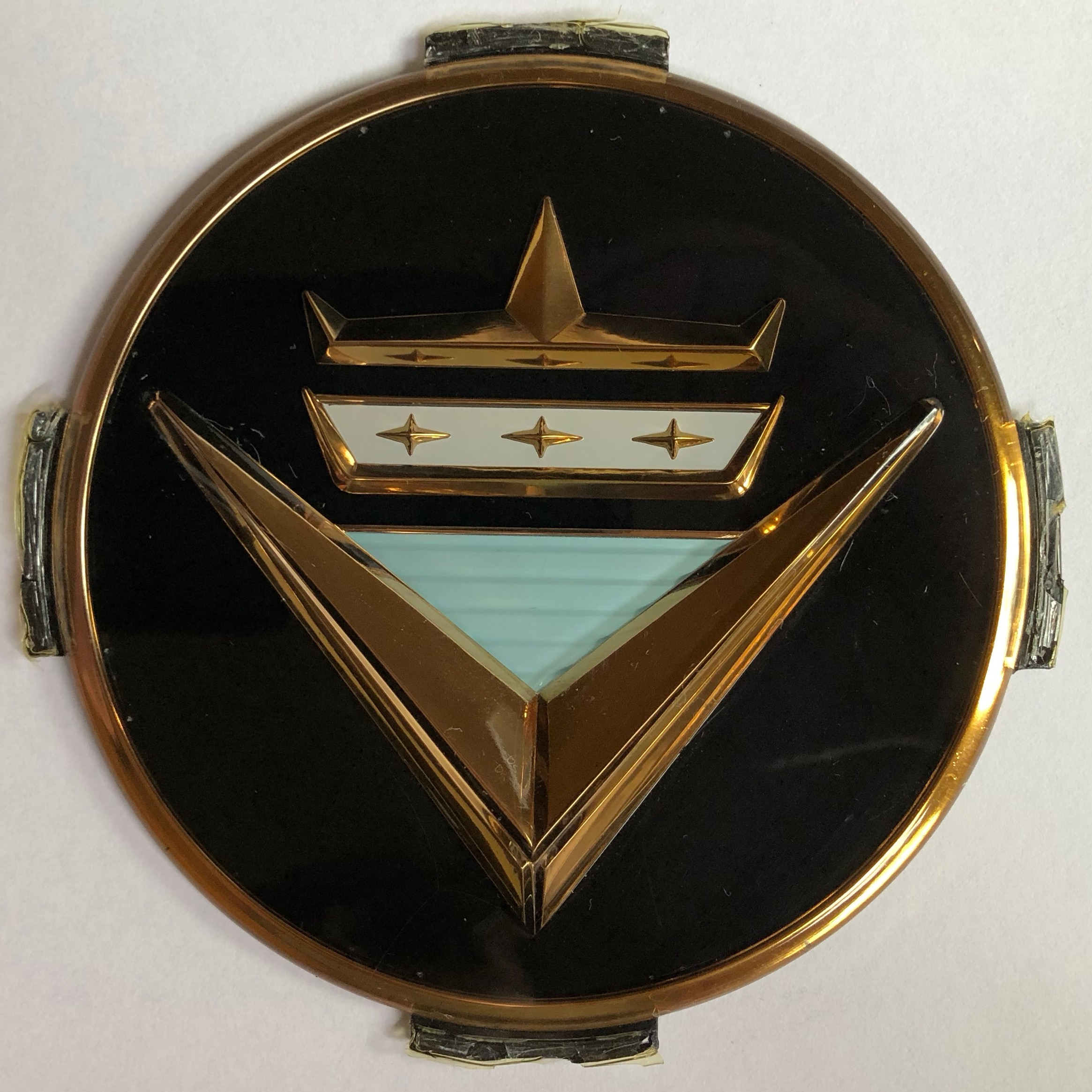
1957 El Morocco hubcap center insert
