= Moonlight in Vermont (film) =

1943 film

- Directed by: Edward C. Lilley
- Cinematography: Jerome Ash
- Distributed by: Universal Pictures
- Release date: December 24, 1943
- Running time: 62 min.
- Country: United States
- Language: English

Moonlight in Vermont is the title of a 1943 upbeat American musical dramatic film.

== Plot ==
A Vermont farm girl Gwen Harding enrolls in the renowned Devereau dance school in New York. Her singing makes her semi-popular, and she is soon noticed by fellow student Richard "Slick" Ellis. Ellis' jealous girlfriend Brenda Allenby is soon involved. Farm problems conflict with dance school life and even though her new friends try to help out, other problems, including a vindictive romantic rival, arise.

== Cast ==
- Gloria Jean as Gwen Harding
- Ray Malone as Richard 'Slick' Ellis
- George Dolenz as Lionel Devereau
- Fay Helm as Lucy Meadows
- Betty McCabe as Joan
- Sidney Miller as Cyril
- Vivian Austin as Brenda Allenby
- Patsy O'Connor as Alice
- Mira McKinney as Elvira
- William 'Billy' Benedict as Abel
- Virginia Brissac as Aunt Bess
- Russell Simpson as Uncle Rufus
