= Michael Essany =

American comedian (born 1982)

- Born: October 22, 1982 (age 44); Valparaiso, Indiana, U.S.
- Occupations: comedian, talk show host, politician
- Years active: 1997–2003
- Website: michaelessany.com

Michael Essany (born October 22, 1982, in Valparaiso, Indiana) is an American comedian and talk show host.

In 2001, Teen People magazine included him on its list of "One of 20 Teens Who Would Change the World".

Essany hosted The Michael Essany Show on local, national and international television for seven years. He has also written a column for The Times of Northwest Indiana, published multiple books, and twice run for public office. He is a 2005 graduate of Valparaiso University.

Essany hosted three episodes of The Goodnight Show with Michael Essany in August 2017.
