= I'm from the City =

1938 film directed by Ben Holmes

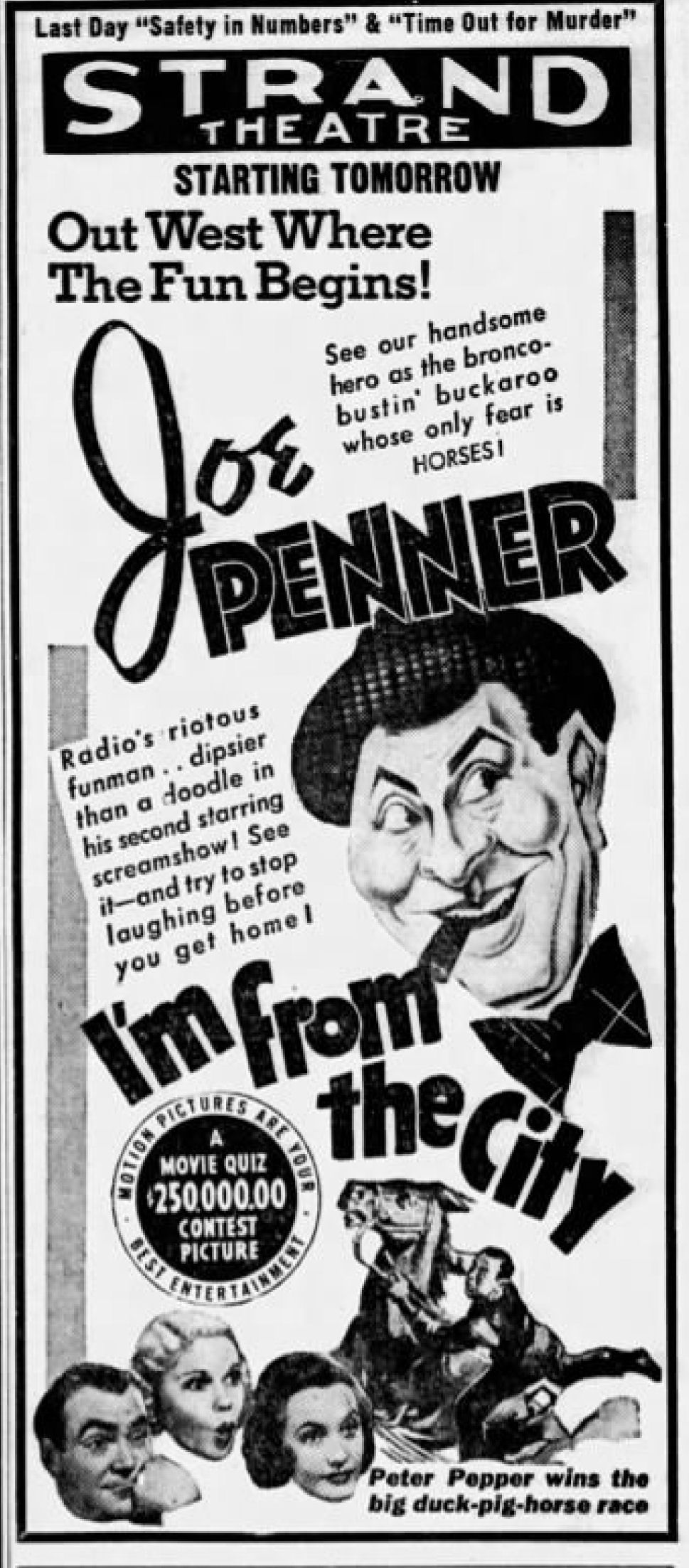
- Newspaper advertisement
- Directed by: Ben Holmes
- Screenplay by: Nicholas T. Barrows; Robert St. Clair; John Grey
- Story by: Ben Holmes
- Produced by: William Sistrom
- Starring: Joe Penner; Richard Lane; Lorraine Krueger
- Cinematography: Frank Redman
- Edited by: Ted Cheesman
- Music by: Roy Webb
- Production company: RKO Radio Pictures
- Release date: August 5, 1938 (US)
- Running time: 66 minutes
- Country: United States
- Language: English

I'm from the City is a 1938 American comedy Western film directed by Ben Holmes, who also wrote the original story that was adapted into a screenplay by Nicholas T. Barrows, Robert St. Clair and John Grey. William Sistrom produced the film for RKO Pictures, which also distributed the film. It premiered on August 5, 1938. The film stars Joe Penner, Richard Lane and Lorraine Krueger.

== Cast ==
- Joe Penner as Peter 'Pete' Pepper
- Richard Lane as Captain Oliver 'Ollie' Fitch
- Lorraine Krueger as Rosie Martindale
- Paul Guilfoyle as Willie
- Kay Sutton as Marlene Martindale
- Kathryn Sheldon as Grandma Hattie Martindale
- Ethan Laidlaw as Jeff, Ranch Foreman
- Lafe McKee as Colonel Bixby (credited as Lafayette McKee)
- Edmund Cobb as Red, Ranch Hand
- Clyde Kenney as Butch, Ranch Hand (credited as Clyde Kinney)
- Hank Bell as Cowboy Near Pig Cage (uncredited)
- Willie Best as Train Porter (uncredited)
- Bud Jamison as Circus Spectator Next to Rosie (uncredited)
- Chris-Pin Martin as Mexican Ranch Hand (uncredited)
- Clarence Nash as Duck (voice) (uncredited)
