= Ray Malone =

Choreographer and dancer

Ray Malone was a tap dancer and choreographer who appeared in films and television programs. He was a regular on Broadway Open House. He had major roles in the films Slightly Terrific and Moonlight in Vermont. He was also a guest on various shows including a handful of appearances on Dagmar's Canteen as well as on the Garry Moore Show. He performed in the Colgate Comedy Hour in a variety of roles. Jerry Lewis introduced Malone in a performance on the show with Eve Young, who sang "Hello, Young Lovers", followed by Malone in a dance and tap performance.

Malone was a dancer and dance director for the musical "Hugs and Kisses". He recorded an album with street performer Moondog.
