= Slightly Terrific =

1944 film directed by Edward F. Cline

- Directed by: Edward F. Cline
- Screenplay by: Edward Dein; Stanley Davis
- Story by: Edith Watkins; Florence McEnany
- Produced by: Alexis Thurn-Taxis
- Starring: Leon Errol; Anne Rooney; Eddie Quillan; Richard Lane; Betty Kean; Ray Malone; Lillian Cornell; Donald Novis; Lorraine Krueger
- Cinematography: Paul Ivano
- Edited by: Norman A. Cerf
- Production company: Universal Pictures
- Distributed by: Universal Pictures
- Release date: May 5, 1944
- Running time: 61 minutes
- Country: United States
- Language: English

Slightly Terrific is a 1944 American comedy film directed by Edward F. Cline and written by Edward Dein and Stanley Davis. The film stars Leon Errol, Anne Rooney, Eddie Quillan, Richard Lane, Betty Kean, Ray Malone, Lillian Cornell, Donald Novis and Lorraine Krueger. The film was released on May 5, 1944, by Universal Pictures.

== Cast ==
- Leon Errol as James P. Tuttle / John P. Tuttle
- Anne Rooney as Julie Bryant
- Eddie Quillan as Charlie Young
- Richard Lane as Mike Hamilton
- Betty Kean as Marie Mason
- Ray Malone as Joey Bryant
- Lillian Cornell as Gypsy Queen
- Donald Novis as Patrick Michael O'Toole
- Lorraine Krueger as Peggy
- Jayne Forrest as Valerie
- Lee Bennett as Freddie Jordan
