= Lorraine Krueger =

American actress (1918–2003)

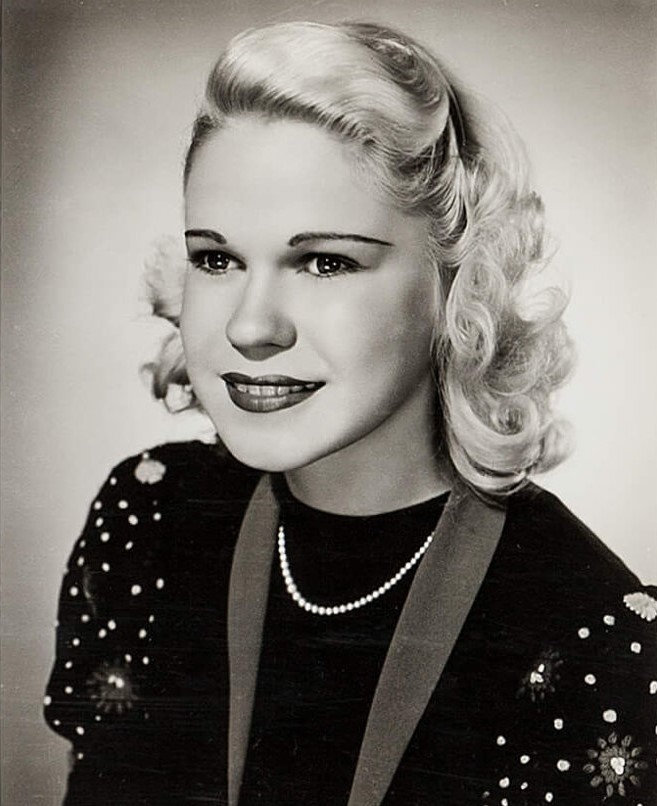
- Krueger in the film Exposed (1938)
- Born: February 27, 1918; St. Louis, Missouri
- Died: July 15, 2003 (aged 85); Westlake Village, California
- Occupation: Actress
- Years active: 1937-1946

Lorraine Krueger (February 27, 1918 – July 15, 2003) was an American actress.

== Filmography ==
Year	Title	Role	Notes
1937	New Faces of 1937	Suzy	
1938	Everybody's Doing It	Bubbles Blane	
1938	Bringing Up Baby	Minor Role	Uncredited
1938	I'm From the City	Rosie Martindale	
1938	Exposed	Betty Clarke	
1938	Idiot's Delight	Les Blondes - Bebe	
1939	All Women Have Secrets	Molly	
1940	The Farmer's Daughter	Valerie	
1940	Golden Gloves	Jenny	Uncredited
1940	Dance, Girl, Dance	Dolly	
1941	Model Wife	Jitterbug	
1941	Unholy Partners	Girl at Party	Uncredited
1943	Hi, Buddy	Lorraine Krueger	
1943	He's My Guy	Specialty	
1943	Sarong Girl	Blonde Bridesmaid	
1943	The Adventures of a Rookie	Eve - Party Guest	Uncredited
1944	Career Girl	Ann	
1944	Slightly Terrific	Peggy	
1944	Henry Aldrich's Little Secret	Check Girl	Uncredited
1944	Here Come the Waves	Wave	Uncredited
1945	Out of This World	Maizie	Uncredited
1946	One Exciting Week	Helen Pickett	(final film role)
