= He's My Guy (film) =

1943 film

- Theatrical release poster
- Directed by: Edward F. Cline
- Screenplay by: M. Coates Webster; Grant Garett
- Story by: Kenneth Higgins
- Produced by: Will Cowan
- Starring: Dick Foran; Irene Hervey; Joan Davis; Fuzzy Knight; Don Douglas; Samuel S. Hinds
- Cinematography: John W. Boyle
- Edited by: Fred R. Feitshans Jr.
- Music by: Charles Previn
- Production company: Universal Pictures
- Distributed by: Universal Pictures
- Release date: March 26, 1943
- Running time: 64 minutes
- Country: United States
- Language: English

He's My Guy is a 1943 American comedy film directed by Edward F. Cline and written by M. Coates Webster and Grant Garett. The film stars Dick Foran, Irene Hervey, Joan Davis, Fuzzy Knight, Don Douglas and Samuel S. Hinds. The film was released on March 26, 1943, by Universal Pictures.

The ballad and jazz standard written by Don Raye and Gene de Paul with the same title as this film was introduced by Foran and Davis.

== Cast ==
- Dick Foran as Van Moore
- Irene Hervey as Terry Allen
- Joan Davis as Madge Donovan
- Fuzzy Knight as Sparks
- Don Douglas as Kirk
- Samuel S. Hinds as Johnson
- William Halligan as Elwood
- Gertrude Niesen as herself
- The Diamond Brothers as Themselves
- Louis DaPron as himself
- The Mills Brothers as Themselves
- Lorraine Krueger as herself
- The Dorene Sisters as Themselves
