= The Jenny McCarthy Show =

Jenny McCarthy has had two shows by the name of The Jenny McCarthy Show:

- The Jenny McCarthy Show (1997 TV series), a 1997 American variety/sketch comedy series starring McCarthy that aired on MTV
- The Jenny McCarthy Show (2013 talk show), a 2013 American pop-culture talk show starring McCarthy that aired on VH1

== See also ==
- Jenny (TV series), a 1997–1998 American sitcom starring McCarthy that aired on NBC
