= Dagmar bumper =

Slang for 1950s bullet shaped automobile bumper guards

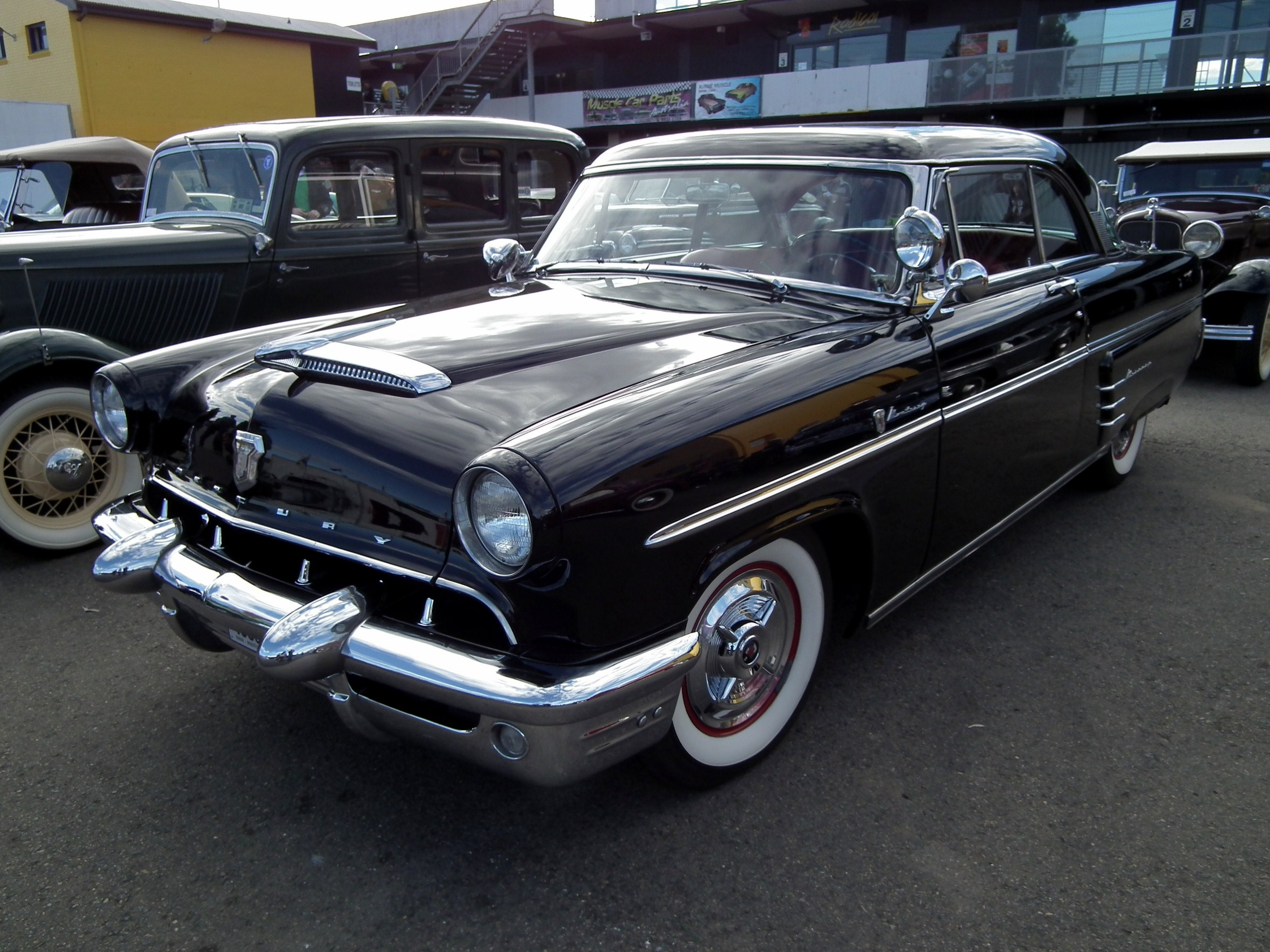
1953 Mercury Monterey with Dagmars

Dagmar bumpers (also known as "bullet bumpers") is a slang term for chrome conical-shaped bumper guards that began to appear on the front bumper or grille assemblies of certain American automobiles following World War II. They reached their peak in the mid-1950s.

== Derivation ==
The term evokes the prominent bosom of Dagmar, a buxom early-1950s television personality featuring low-cut gowns and conical bra cups. She was amused by the tribute.

== History ==
As originally conceived by Harley Earl, GM Vice President of Design, the conical bumper guards would mimic artillery shells. Placed inboard of the headlights on front bumpers of Cadillacs, they were intended to both convey the image of a speeding projectile and protect vehicles' front ends in collisions. The similarity of these features to the then popular bullet bra as epitomized by a buxom television personality Dagmar was inescapable. The term ("Dagmars") appeared in print as early as 1957.

As the 1950s wore on and American automakers' use of chrome grew more flamboyant, they grew more pronounced. The black rubber tips they gained on the 1957 Cadillac Eldorado Brougham and other models were known as pasties.

In the early 1960s, American car designers shed both rear tailfins and prominent bumper guards.

== Use ==
Postwar Cadillacs began sporting conical bumper guards in the 1946 model year. In 1951 models, some were raised into the grille. In 1957, black rubber tips appeared. The element continued to become more pronounced in size through 1958, but were eliminated in the 1959 Cadillac redesign.

Mercury sported Dagmars in 1953 through the 1956 model year. Lincoln added Dagmars in 1960, with a black rubber ring separating the body from the chrome tip.

Buick added Dagmars on its 1954 and 1955 models, in 1954 as part of the bumper assembly, and moved into the grille in 1955.

Packard included large Dagmars on the bumper in 1955 and 1956 models.

Full-sized Chevys in 1961 and 1963 also had small rubber Dagmars on the front bumper, and 1962 Ford Galaxie had small rubber Dagmars as an option.

The GAZ-13 Chaika had similar bumper designs until their discontinuation in the 1980s

== Other iterations ==
In 1974, British motoring press applied the name of statuesque British actress Sabrina to oversized pairs of protruding rubber bumper blocks added to MG MGB, MG Midget, Triumph Spitfire and Triumph TR6 sports cars to meet strengthened US auto safety regulations. The term, which was not common in the U.S., lingered at least to the mid-1990s in some areas.

== Gallery ==
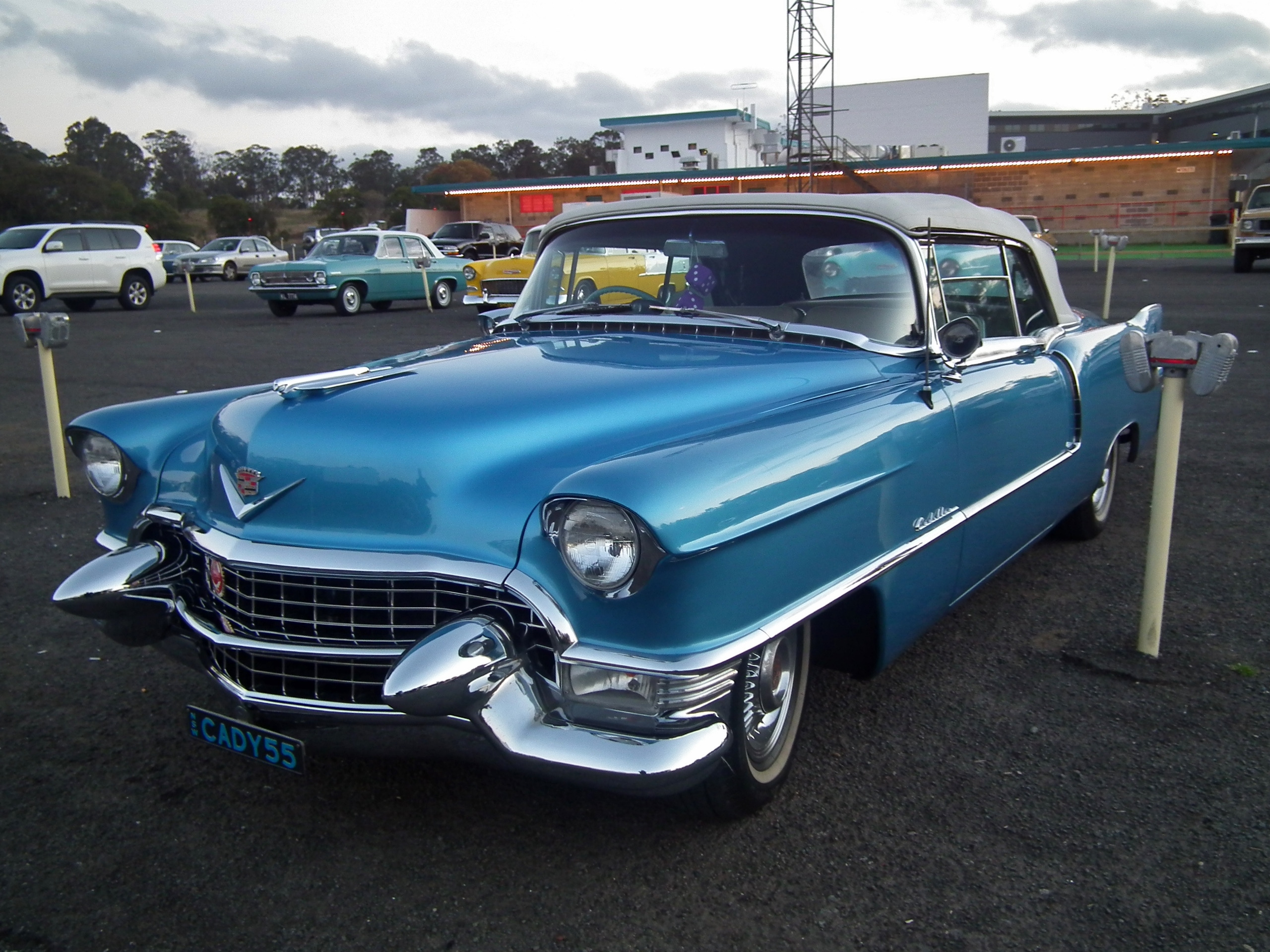
1955 Cadillac Eldorado with Dagmars

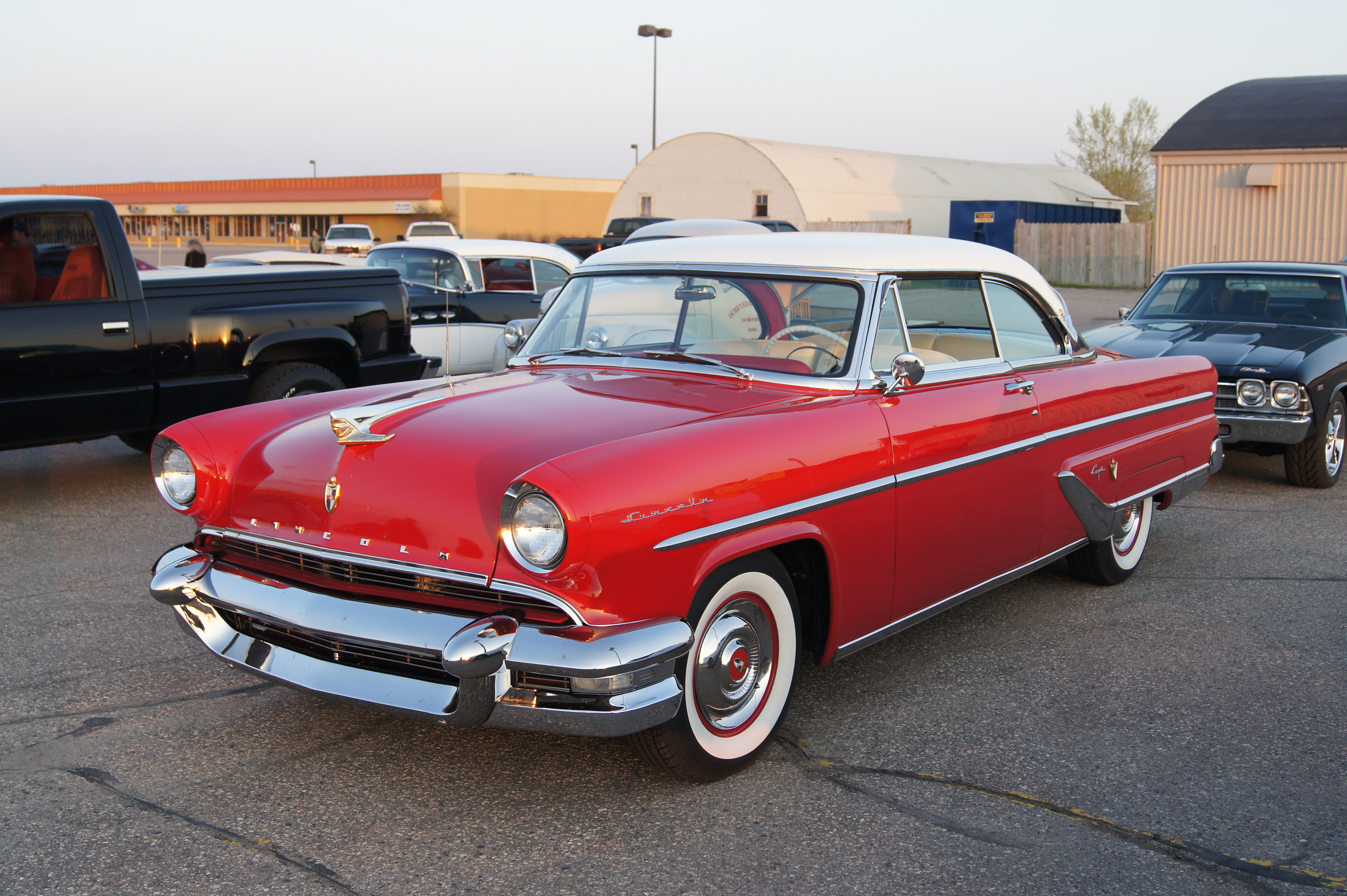
1955 Lincoln Capri with Dagmar bumpers

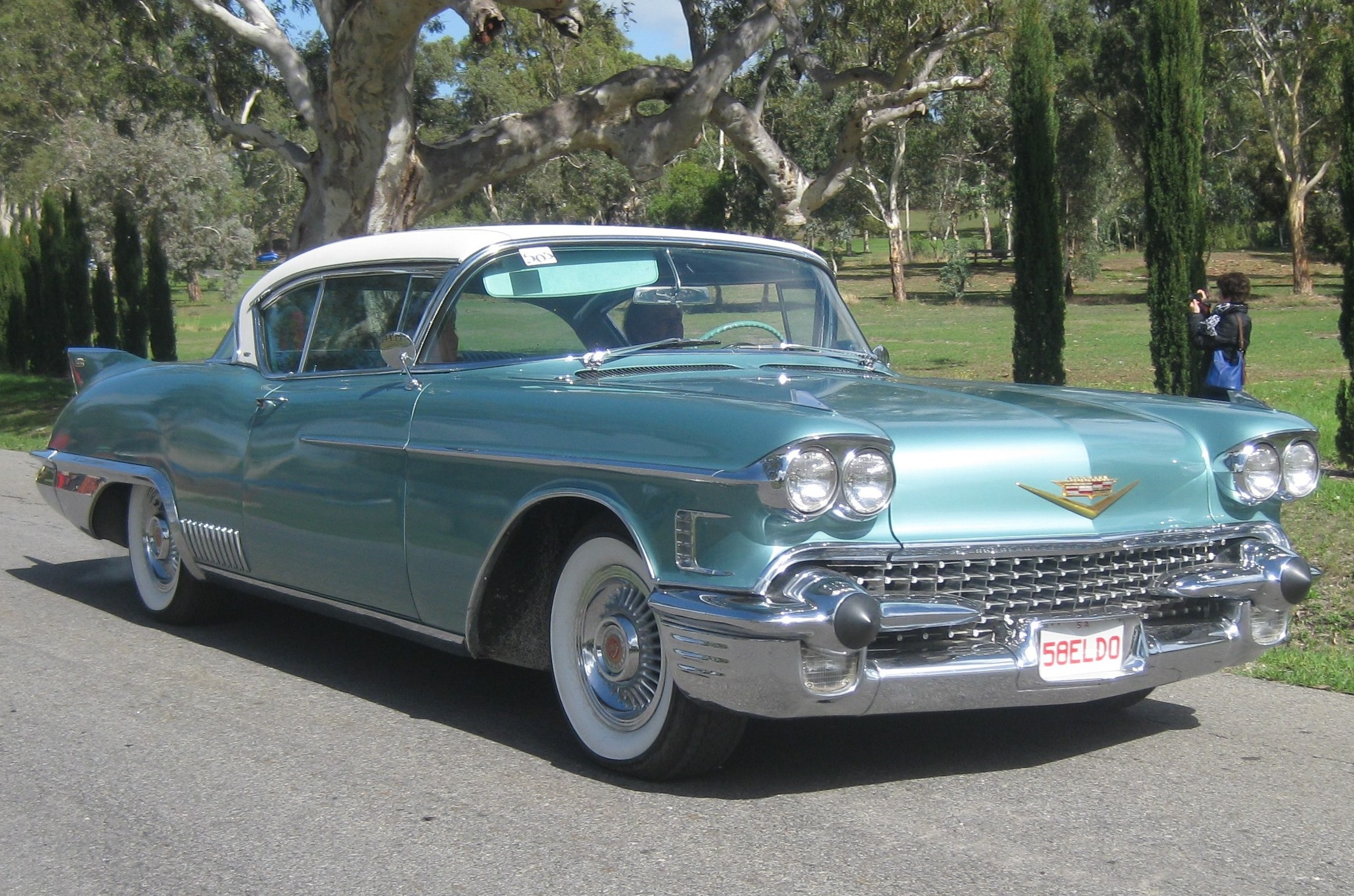
1958 Cadillac Eldorado Seville with rubber-tipped pasties
