= The Michael Essany Show =

- Country of origin: United States

Original release
- Network: E!
- Release: 1997 – 2004

The Michael Essany Show is an American television talk show hosted by Michael Essany that aired on local, national, and international television from 1997 to 2004. Hosted by Valparaiso, Indiana resident Michael Essany, the program was originally broadcast on public access television through TCI Cable before developing a deal with Leeza Gibbons and broadcast for two seasons on E! Entertainment Television. Gibbons, who was the second guest on the cable access show, would later sign Essany to a development deal two years after her appearance on the show. Essany, a teenager when the show began, based the show on The Tonight Show Starring Johnny Carson.

The show, which broadcast out of the Essany family home in Valparaiso, included Essany's mother as the director and makeup artist, as well as his father as the camera operator. Essany's friend Mike Randazzo served as his sidekick on the show.

== Guests ==
The show's small size, especially during its cable access years, led to difficulty booking guests. The first 200 celebrities contacted by the show declined to appear on the show. However, during its run the program featured such notable guests as Gerald Ford, Ray Romano, Kevin Bacon, Walter Cronkite, Carrot Top, Kelly Rowland, Michael Ian Black, Tom Green, Mila Kunis, "Weird Al" Yankovic, and Jay Leno.
