= Jerry Lester =

American actor, comedian and musician (1910–95)

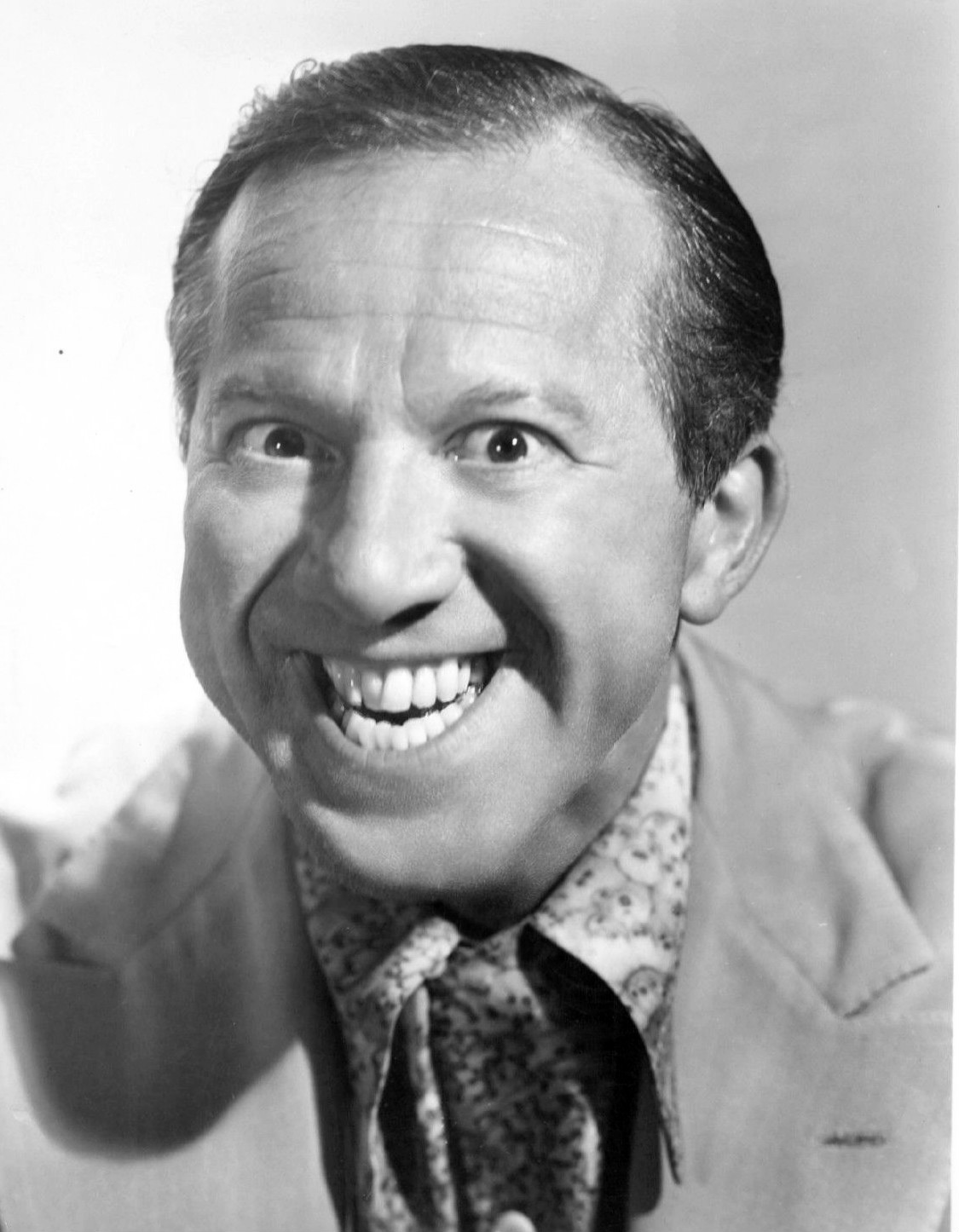
- Lester as host of Broadway Open House on NBC, 1950
- Born: Lester J. Goldberg; February 16, 1910; Chicago, Illinois, U.S.
- Died: March 23, 1995 (aged 85); Miami, Florida, U.S.
- Education: Northwestern University
- Occupations: Actor; comedian; host; singer
- Years active: 1943–1975
- Spouses: Ardelle Unger (m. 1934; div. 1951); Alice Elgie Wall (m. 1951)
- Children: 3
- Relatives: Buddy Lester (brother)

Jerry Lester (born Lester J. Goldberg; February 16, 1910 – March 23, 1995) was an American comedian, singer and performer on radio, television and the stage, known for playing the father of the main characters, Mike Firpo, in the comedy Odds and Evens and who hosted the first network late night television program as host of Broadway Open House on NBC, a vaudeville-esque combination of comedy and music, whose success demonstrated the potential for late-night television and led to the creation of the Tonight Show.

== Early life ==
Lester was born in Chicago, Illinois. His father was a music critic. As a youth, Lester competed in dance contests and performed in various venues. Following his graduation from Northwestern University, he performed nationally in music halls and nightclubs, going on to appear in vaudeville, several Broadway musicals including Beat the Band and Jackpot, and Hollywood films in the 1940s, as well as being a performer on radio.

== Career ==
A CBS radio program starring Lester debuted on July 25, 1943. In 1950, he became host of Cavalcade of Stars on the DuMont Television Network, replacing Jack Carter. After viewers phoned in their appreciation for Lester's guest appearance on an early television talk show, NBC president Pat Weaver invited Lester to be one of the hosts of Broadway Open House, a planned late-night show whose host, Don Hornsby, was stricken with poliomyelitis and died two weeks before the show was scheduled to premiere. Lester quit Cavalcade of Stars and Jackie Gleason was hired as his replacement; the show was soon renamed The Jackie Gleason Show.

Broadway Open House went on the air in May 1950 with Lester hosting three nights a week and Morey Amsterdam hosting two nights, but Lester soon became the show's sole emcee. The program introduced and made stars of Steve Allen, Jack Paar and Johnny Carson, all of whom later hosted the Tonight Show. It also made a star of cast member Dagmar, who became such a sensation that she overshadowed Lester, leading him to walk off the show in May 1951.

In 1952, he appeared frequently as a panelist on the ABC-TV game show The Name's the Same.

Lester was host of The Jerry Lester Show, an afternoon program on ABC-TV in 1953. Later in the 1950s, Lester appeared as a regular on the game show Pantomime Quiz, and variety shows such as Saturday Night Dance Party.

In 1959, he moved to Los Angeles and became host of a local late-night comedy and musical variety show on KTTV.

Lester returned to prominence in theatre in the 1960s, appearing in the lead role of slave Pseudolus in the road production of A Funny Thing Happened on the Way to the Forum, subsequently replacing Zero Mostel on Broadway, and playing Seabee in the 1969 production of South Pacific.

== Death ==
Afflicted with Alzheimer's disease in 1975, he had trouble memorizing his nightclub monologues, and retired from show business. He died in Miami, Florida, in 1995. His brother was actor and comedian Buddy Lester. He had three children.

== Television ==
Year	Title	Role	Notes
1967	The Monkees	Kramm	S1:E31, "Monkees in the Movies"
