= Don "Creesh" Hornsby =

American stand-up comedian, novelty pianist

Don Hornsby (December 6, 1923 - May 22, 1950), aka Creesh Hornsby, was a comedian and novelty pianist who was slated to be the original host of Broadway Open House, American network television's first late night program.

Born in Cooper, Texas, Hornsby attended Hardin Junior College in Wichita Falls for a short time before joining the Marines. Originally a straightforward pianist, eventually Hornsby's nightclub act, which Life described as "a five-hour marathon of surrealist madness", incorporated rubber alligators, magic tricks, acrobatics, dry ice and a live donkey. Hornsby's performance, a continuous set during which he was served meals onstage, also featured custom-made props, including a "tickle-tickle" machine, which a United Press article called "a Buck Rogers contraption with red lights, blue dials and green knobs" that fired "a bombardment of tiny rubber cones", which Hornsby would then scoop up with a butterfly net. One of his specialties was playing the Warsaw Concerto while suspended by his heels above the piano.

His catchphrase "creesh", which he shouted at frequent intervals onstage, is a portmanteau word meaning "constructive escapism". As Hornsby explained it, "creeshism" in action meant that "anything can be funny in the proper situation." Among his fanbase were veteran comedians Fred Allen, Phil Silvers and Groucho Marx.

On the strength of his act—and an endorsement from Bob Hope—Hornsby was signed to a five-year contract with NBC and was set to host the program that would become Broadway Open House, but he was diagnosed with polio the week before the series was originally scheduled to debut. The disease led to his death less than a week later at age 26 in Eastview, New York.

== Personal life ==

Hornsby was married to Dorothy Carr, and they had three children, Dawn, Dave and Dare. They met in 1942 while he was in the Marine Corps when she was a student at San Francisco State College. Hornsby contracted spinal meningitis while in service, and as Dorothy told The American Weekly, during her frequent visits during his ten-month convalescence in a naval hospital, "we more or less grew to accept the fact that we would be married." They were married a few days after his discharge.

She described Hornsby as "brilliant and talented. He understood people and taught me to. He thought the world would be a better place if more people let off steam through laughter, rather than violence. He could see the humorous side of everything, yet he had a deep understanding of the serious things."
