= The Goodnight Show with Michael Essany =

American talk show

The Goodnight Show with Michael Essany is an American television talk show hosted by Michael Essany. The show's three episodes began streaming on Amazon Video in August 2017.
