= Dagmar's Canteen (TV series) =

American variety television series

Dagmar's Canteen is an American variety television series that was broadcast on NBC, first as a single 45-minute episode on November 30, 1951, then as a series of 15-minute episodes from March 22 to June 14, 1952.

Dagmar's Canteen was broadcast from 12:15 a.m. Eastern Time until 12:45 a.m. ET, on Saturdays, starring Dagmar as the hostess of a canteen for military personnel She conducted interviews, sang and danced. A weekly feature was the reading of plays that Dagmar had written, with military people and members of the cast joining her. Each episode also featured a guest star selected from the armed forces.

Besides Dagmar, the 1951 episode featured Ray Malone, comic actor Sid Goode, bandleader Milton Delugg, and Jeanne Lewis (Dagmar's sister). Tim Herbert replaced Sid Goode when the regular series began the next spring. Milton DeLugg led the orchestra. Guest performers who appeared on the show included Joey Faye, Robert Scheerer, and Tim Herbert.

One of NBC's largest TV studios was converted into a canteen for each episode. The facility was set up with sandwiches, soft drinks, hostesses, dancing, tables, and chairs to accommodate 200 men and women from the military.

Hal Friedman was the producer, and Alan Neuman was the director. Lou Meltzer and Allan Walker were the writers. The program was sustaining.

== Reception ==
Critic Jack Gould found little to like about the program in a review in The New York Times. After referring to Dagmar's previous appearances in bit parts on Broadway Open House, he wrote that on Dagmar's Canteen she had to "essentially play the dumb blonde not for just one minute but for thirty." Trying to turn the earlier role "into a career . . . simply does not come off", he wrote. Tap dancer Malone was the only member of the supporting company who found favor in the review.

A review in The Philadelphia Inquirer complimented the work of DeLugg and Malone but said that their efforts alone were not enough to carry the program. It pointed out that the show was an effort by NBC to make use of its contract with Dagmar that extended beyond the ending of Broadway Open House. Critic Merrill Panitt wrote about the star, "Dagmar today is not the Dagmar of yesteryear, and instead of being funny with her incongruous voice inflections and her malapropisms, she's downright ludicrous". He added, ". . . she succeeded only in being a parody of her former self".
