= Dagmar (actress) =

American actress, model, TV personality (1921–2001)

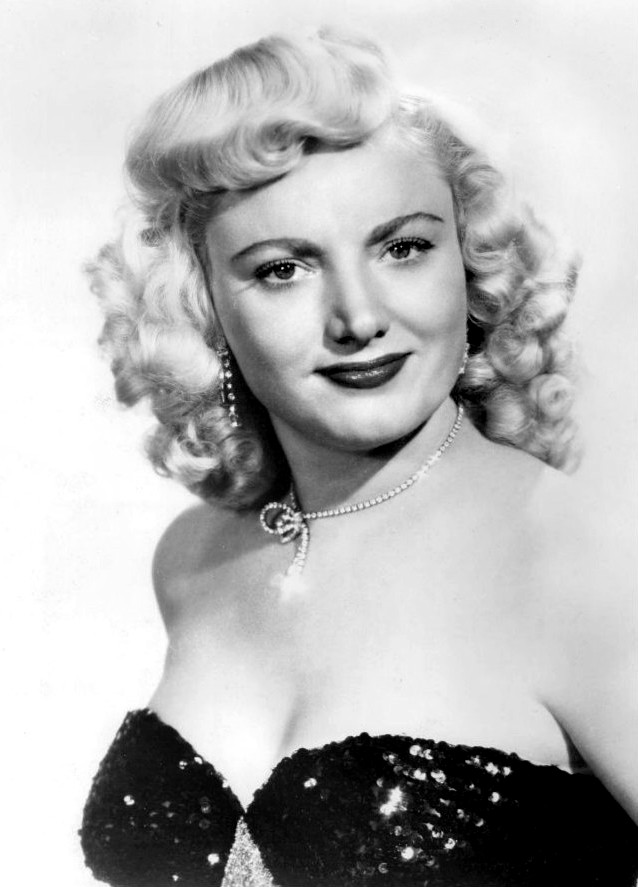
- Publicity photo, 1958
- Born: Virginia Ruth Egnor; November 29, 1921; Yawkey, West Virginia, U.S.
- Died: October 9, 2001 (aged 79); Ceredo, West Virginia, U.S.
- Other names: Virginia Lewis; Jennie Lewis
- Occupations: Actress, model, television personality
- Spouse(s): Angelo Lewis (m. 1941; div. 19??); Danny Dayton (m. 1951; div. 1961); Dick Hinds (m. 1967; div. 19??)

Virginia Ruth "Jennie" Lewis (née Egnor; November 29, 1921 – October 9, 2001), known professionally as Dagmar, was an American actress, model, and television personality. In the 1950s she became one of the first major female stars of television, receiving much press coverage.

== Early life ==
Egnor was born in Yawkey, West Virginia, and went to high school in Huntington, West Virginia, where she was known as Ruthie. She attended Huntington Business School and worked at Walgreens, in the West Virginia Building, as a cashier, waitress, sandwich maker, and soda jerk. After her marriage to Angelo Lewis in 1941, she moved to New York, where he was a naval officer stationed at Navy Ferry Command on Long Island.

== Broadway ==
Egnor adopted Jennie Lewis as her stage name (taken from her real-life married name, Virginia Lewis). To keep herself busy, she became a fashion photographer's model, and in 1944, other models encouraged her to audition for comedians Ole Olsen and Chic Johnson. Although she had no show business experience, she was cast in their Broadway musical revue, Laffing Room Only, a Shubert production at the Winter Garden Theatre. With Olsen and Johnson, she performed in four sketches from December 23, 1944, to July 14, 1945.

Playing a chorus girl named Bubbles, she appeared with Bert Lahr in the Broadway comedy Burlesque, which ran for 439 performances from December 25, 1946, until January 10, 1948. The play was set in the basement dressing-room of a midwest burlesque theater, a New York hotel suite, and a theater in Paterson, New Jersey.

== Television ==
In 1950, when Lewis was hired by Jerry Lester for NBC's first late-night show Broadway Open House (1950–51), he renamed her Dagmar. Lester devised the name as a satirical reference following the huge success on television of the TV series Mama (1949–1957), in which the younger sister, Dagmar Hansen, was portrayed by Robin Morgan. As Dagmar, Lewis was instructed to wear a low-cut gown, sit on a stool, and play the role of a stereotypical dumb blonde. With tight sweaters displaying the 5 ft 8 in (173 cm) Lewis's curvy figure, her dim-bulb character was an immediate success, soon attracting much more attention than Lester. Lewis quickly showed that regardless of appearances, she was quite bright and quick-witted. Her appearances created a sensation, leading to much press coverage and a salary increase from $75 to $1,250. With Dagmar getting all the attention and Lester burned out from having to create new material five nights per week, Lester walked off his own show in May 1951, and Dagmar became the host until the show was cancelled in August 1951.

Alfred Eisenstaedt photographed Dagmar for the July 16, 1951, issue of Life.

Dagmar became one of the leading personalities of early 1950s live television, doing sketch comedy on Milton Berle's Texaco Star Theater, the Bob Hope Show, and other shows. On June 17, 1951, she appeared on the Colgate Comedy Hour with host Eddie Cantor and guests Milton Berle, Phil Foster, and Jack Leonard. In 1951, she made a TV guest appearance with Frank Sinatra, which prompted Columbia Records producer Mitch Miller to record "Mama Will Bark", a novelty duet between Sinatra and Dagmar. The record has often been considered one of the worst of his career; however, it made no. 21 on the Billboard charts.

Dagmar was featured in a Life cover story with Alfred Eisenstaedt's photo of her on the July 16, 1951 issue. For the interior photo essay, Life photographers followed her to rehearsals and accompanied her on a vacation to her home town in West Virginia.

=== Dagmar's Canteen ===
In 1952, she hosted the short-lived, late Saturday evening Dagmar's Canteen (which aired on NBC at 12:15 am Eastern Time), in which she sang, danced, interviewed servicemen, and performed comedy routines. The basic premise of the show was that servicemen from the audience were given roles to act with Dagmar in sketches.

One of Dagmar's sisters, Jean, was a member of the cast of Dagmar's Canteen. Jean previously worked as a chorus girl on Broadway, and served as Dagmar's secretary, handling her sister's fan mail, which sometimes soared to 8,000 letters per month.

=== Later career ===
When her television show ended, Dagmar performed in Las Vegas shows and summer stock theater. Liberace spoke glowingly of her in an interview, stating that she had given him his big break as her accompanist early in his career. In the 1950s, Dagmar was a regular panelist on the game show Who Said That?, with H. V. Kaltenborn, Deems Taylor, Frank Conniff, Peggy Ann Garner, and Boris Karloff. She occasionally made guest appearances on such shows as What's My Line?, The Mike Wallace Interview, and Masquerade Party (once disguised as John L. Lewis), and during the 1960s, she appeared on Hollywood Squares, The Mike Douglas Show, and other shows.

Dagmar was one of a number of performers who posed for pictures in the Patrick Dennis novel First Lady, published in 1965, as the soubrette and presidential courtesan, Gladys Goldfoil.

In 1950s auto design, the slang term Dagmar bumper emerged to describe dual pointed chrome projections on the front ends of Cadillacs, Buicks, Packards, and other U.S. automobiles, an allusion to the actress's physique and trademark attire.

== Personal life and death ==
After her marriage to Angelo Lewis ended, she was married to actor Danny Dayton through much of the 1950s, and then to bandleader Dick Hinds in 1967. After years on the nightclub circuit, she moved to Ceredo, West Virginia, in June 1996 to be near her family. In her last years, she lived with her brother Bob Egnor and his wife. Dagmar died in Ceredo on October 9, 2001, of undisclosed causes, aged 79. In 2006, she was among the early people to be inducted into the newly formed West Virginia Broadcasting Hall of Fame at the Museum of Radio and Technology in Huntington, West Virginia.

== See also ==
- Mononymous persons
- Faye Emerson
- High School Confidential, where Dagmar is mentioned
- Dagmar car, sporty model of the 1920s Crawford
