= Broadway Open House =

- As Dagmar rose to fame on Broadway Open House, Alfred Eisenstaedt photographed her for the July 16, 1951 issue of Life.
- Genre: Variety show
- Created by: Sylvester L. Weaver, Jr.
- Starring: Jerry Lester; Morey Amsterdam; Dagmar
- Announcer: Wayne Howell (1950–1951); Frank Gallop (1951)
- Music by: Milton DeLugg (musical director and bandleader)
- Composer: Milton Delugg
- Country of origin: United States

Production
- Production locations: Studio 6B, NBC Studios; New York City
- Running time: 60 minutes
- Production company: NBC Productions

Original release
- Network: NBC
- Release: May 29, 1950 – August 24, 1951

Related
- The Tonight Show

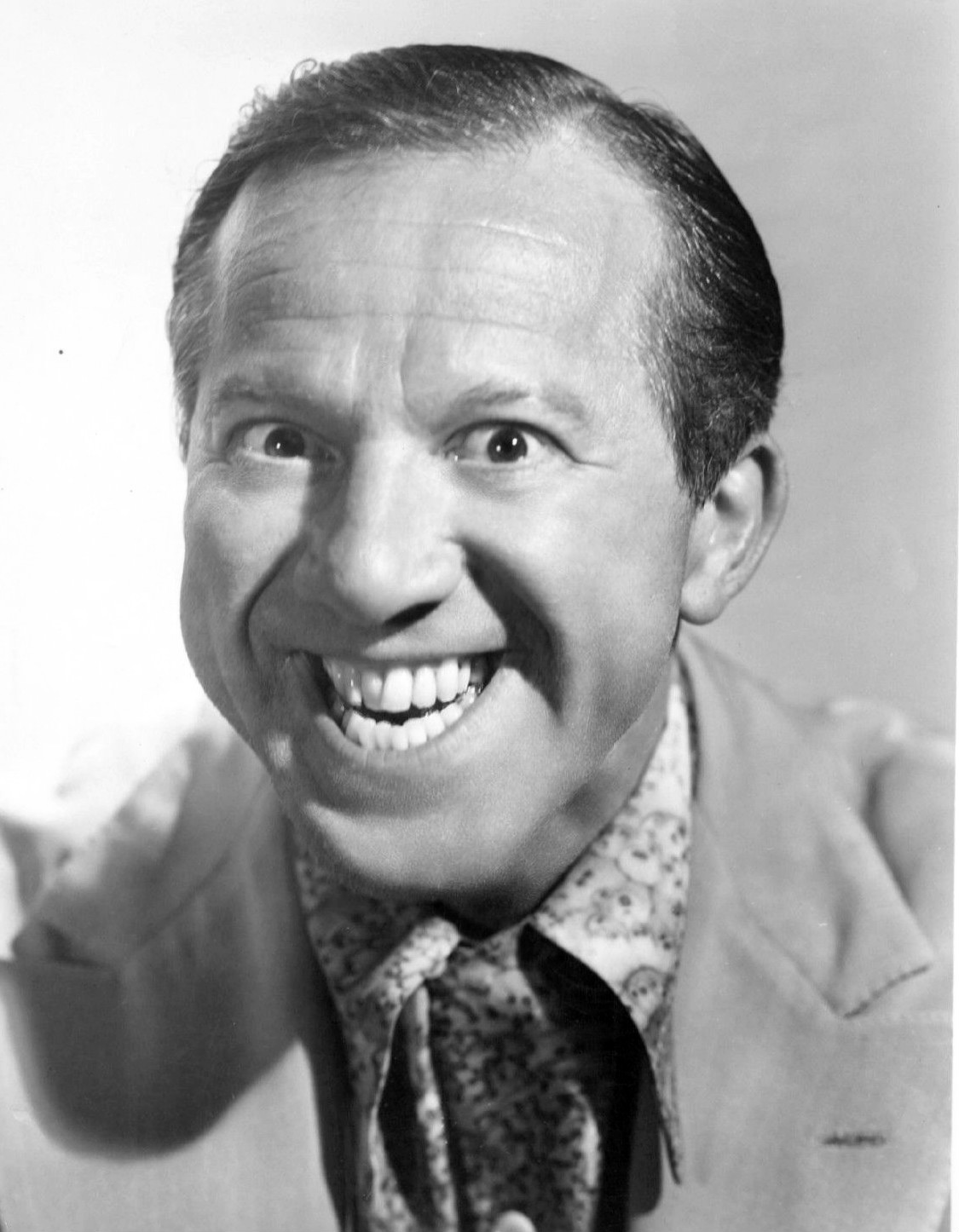
Jerry Lester, first host of Broadway Open House

Broadway Open House is network television's first late-night comedy-variety series. It was telecast live on NBC from May 29, 1950, to August 24, 1951, airing weeknights from 11pm to midnight. One of the pioneering TV creations of NBC president Pat Weaver, it demonstrated the potential for late-night programming and led to the later development of The Tonight Show.

== Hosts ==
The show was originally planned to be hosted by comic Don "Creesh" Hornsby (so named because he yelled "Creesh" often). Hornsby had been brought into the variety show business by Bob Hope, whose topical humor would serve as the basis for most of the late-night talk shows that would follow. One week before he was to begin hosting, the 26-year-old Hornsby suddenly contracted polio, from which he died on the day he was to host his first show, May 22, 1950. Hornsby's sudden demise forced NBC to postpone the show and rush to find new hosts on short notice. For the first few weeks, there were different hosts including Dean Martin & Jerry Lewis, Henny Youngman and Robert Alda, among others, with Morey Amsterdam hosting Mondays and Wednesdays.

Broadway Open House was performed before a live studio audience, in the manner of a stage show. Pat Weaver, an NBC executive at the time, noticed the positive feedback that Jerry Lester (then hosting Cavalcade of Stars for Dumont) and his manic personality had received on a recent appearance on NBC and offered Lester the hosting position almost immediately. Lester initially hosted the Tuesday, Thursday and Friday episodes of Broadway Open House until Amsterdam exited the show, leaving Lester the sole host. Lester performed sketches with his crew of sidekicks (including some of the earliest TV appearances of brassy Barbara Nichols), running through standard nightclub comedy routines and introducing the show's vocal group, the Mello Larks. Lester's signature bit was to twist his eyeglasses at a 45-degree angle on his face. The show had occasional guests, including Lenny Bruce, who appeared May 1950 and Charlie Parker who appeared October 31, 1950 (an audio recording exists of his appearance on the show), and there were also audience participation bits, such as having women from the audience join the female cast members in modeling fur coats. Lester's fondness for bean bags became a running gag on the series. The sponsors included Anchor Hocking glassware and Blatz Beer.

== Cast and crew ==
Other Broadway Open House cast members were tap dancer Ray Malone, accordionist Milton DeLugg, announcer Wayne Howell and vocalists Jane Harvey, Andy Roberts and David Street. The show's opening theme music was "The Beanbag Song" by DeLugg, Lester and Willie Stein. A second theme was the song "It's Almost Like Being in Love." DeLugg often played a song he wrote with Stein, "Orange Colored Sky", which became a hit for both Lester and for Nat King Cole.

Vic McLeod, Paul Munro, Ray Buffum and Jac Hein were among the producers. Hein, Munro and Joseph C. Cavalier directed. Stan Burns, Allan Sherman, Art Henley, Alan Sands, and Cal Howard were the writers. The program was developed by Sylvester "Pat" Weaver, a programming vice-president at NBC who had started his career as a production assistant on Fred Allen's radio show Town Hall Tonight in the 1930s. After the 15-month run of Broadway Open House, Weaver further developed his ideas on a local show over NBC's New York station starring Steve Allen, which eventually took to the network in 1954 as The Tonight Show. There are those who dispute Weaver's credit for The Tonight Show, including hosts Steve Allen and Jack Paar. Years later, Paar said "He didn't invent programs, but wrote great memos."

== Dagmar arrives ==
Network variety shows were broadcast weekly, with the production staff having one week to create each new episode. Broadway Open House was under much more pressure, and it was a continuing challenge to come up with fresh material on a nightly basis. Starlet Jennie Lewis was given no script and told, "You just sit there and act dumb. Your name is Dagmar." With her new name, she sat on a stool with a sign around her neck saying "Girl Singer," did breathing exercises, and soon performed as a reader of poems and plays, while Lester made occasional jokes about her "hidden talents." Her appearances created a sensation, leading to much press coverage and a salary increase from $75 to $1,250. Lester was now in the peculiar position of being the second banana on his own show, and he asked NBC to put him on another program. Lester left Broadway Open House in May 1951, and Dagmar carried on as host. On July 16, 1951, she was featured on the front cover of Life, and the show came to an end one month later.

Lester was retained as a rotating host for a new early prime-time variety show the next season, Chesterfield Sound-Off Time, along with Fred Allen and Bob Hope. NBC filled the late-night time slot for the next year with Mary Kay's Nightcap, a non-comic show in which Mary Kay Stearns previewed the next day's programming. For a short time, Dagmar was given a weekly late-night show entitled Dagmar's Canteen. The show's even later time slot (12:15 a.m. Sunday morning) and the lack of a comic partner for Dagmar to foil were factors in the show being short-lived.

Dagmar's run on Broadway Open House and her appearances on other shows (Colgate Comedy Hour, The Milton Berle Show, Masquerade Party) made her the first major female star of television. She continued making guest appearances during the late 1950s with Jack Paar on The Tonight Show.

== Reception ==
Steve Allen remembered Broadway Open House in a 1997 interview.

NBC had tried unsuccessfully to do late night television with the comedian Jerry Lester and with Morey Amsterdam in the early 1950s, but that did not go over well with the viewers. I'm not certain the quality of the show had anything to do with it. At that point in time, you still had a limited number of television sets and television had still not come to a lot of the medium-sized cities around the country. I think you had a lot of people in the network executive suites who were convinced 11 o'clock was just too late for people to stay up and watch television. If that original show (Broadway Open House) had been done five years later, they may have changed their minds, because they did a lot of the same kind of humor we did later.

— Steve Allen

Broadway Open House was an early influence on the comedy stylings of George Carlin who spoke of the show in an interview with the Television Academy recorded December 17, 2007. Carlin prefaced the description of the show with other variety shows of the time, including The Ed Sullivan Show and The Jackie Gleason Show.

... and nobody mentions this when they talk about The Tonight Show and late night television and where it got its start. Everybody mentions Steve Allen, which is the proper place to begin the genealogy of The Tonight Show itself, but a lot of them leave out Broadway Open House with Jerry Lester. Jerry Lester and Milton DeLugg and the orchestra. Milton played the accordion. Ray Malone was a tap dancer. Dagmar was the sex bombshell who, I guess she could pass for a singer, I don't know, uh, and Jerry Lester. Funny. Broadway Open House. And that one really got my attention. 'Cause that was mixed, planned and unplanned, slapstick and verbal and that was just, you know, for me was, that fed me. I never missed Broadway Open House.

— George Carlin

== Episode status ==
No episodes from Amsterdam's hosting run exist. A limited number of episodes from Lester's run have survived and are archived at the Paley Center for Media.
