= 1954 in American television =

This is a list of American television-related events in 1954.

== Events ==
Date	Event	Ref.
January 1	The Rose Parade was broadcast in NTSC color for the first time ever. The NBC broadcast, possibly one of the earliest color broadcasts in American television history, used a new mobile color television studio truck, and the program is carried across the continent on 21 television stations. Color TV sets were placed in public viewing areas (e.g. hotel lobbies, etc.) by RCA as the first color sets wouldn't become available to the public for another few months.	
February 28	The Westinghouse H840CK15 is first offered for sale, the second consumer all-electronic color television set. The set was discontinued about six months after its introduction.	
March 28	Television arrives in the U.S. insular territory of Puerto Rico with the launch of WKAQ-TV in San Juan.	
April	The American Broadcasting Company broadcasts the Army–McCarthy hearings live and in their entirety.	
April	The RCA CT-100 15-inch color sets hit the market. The CT-100 wasn't the world's first color TV, but it was the first to be mass-produced, with 4400 having been made.	
May 16	National Educational Television launches as the nation's first non-commercial, educational broadcast television network.	
September 11	Lee Ann Meriwether wins the Miss America 1955 Beauty Contest, which is broadcast on national television for the first time. About 27 million viewers watched the future television actress win the crown in the pageant.	

== Television programs ==
=== Debuts ===
Date	Debut	Network
January 2	The Spike Jones Show	NBC
January 3	Look Up and Live	CBS
January 4	The Brighter Day	CBS
January 9	Annie Oakley	First-run syndication
January 23	Stories of the Century	First-run syndication
February 1	The Secret Storm	CBS
February 23	Rocky Jones, Space Ranger	First-run syndication
March 11	The Public Defender	CBS
March 14	Night Editor	DuMont
April 1	The Wallace and Ladmo Show	KPHO-TV
April 2	Meet Corliss Archer	First-run syndication
April 8	Justice	NBC
April 18	The Martha Wright Show	ABC
April 20	Love Story	DuMont
April 26	The Tony Martin Show	NBC
April 30	The Vampira Show	KABC-TV
June 25	The Stranger	DuMont
July 3	Stage Show	CBS
July 5	Concerning Miss Marlowe	NBC
July 6	One Minute Please	DuMont
July 6	Summer Playhouse	NBC
July 16	Gamble on Love	DuMont
July 16	The Best in Mystery	NBC
August 5	So You Want to Lead a Band	ABC
August 21	Waterfront	First-run syndication
August 27	Time Will Tell	DuMont
August 28	The Mickey Rooney Show: Hey, Mulligan	NBC
September	DuMont Evening News	DuMont
September 7	It's a Great Life	NBC
September 7	Stop the Music	ABC
September 9	Captain Midnight	CBS
September 10	Dear Phoebe	NBC
September 12	Lassie	CBS
September 13	Medic	NBC
September 15	The Best of Broadway	CBS
September 18	Willy	CBS
September 19	People Are Funny	NBC
September 21	Studio 57	DuMont
September 27	Caesar's Hour	NBC
September 27	The Tonight Show	NBC
September 30	Shower of Stars	CBS
October 1	Flash Gordon	DuMont
October 1	The Lineup	CBS
October 2	The Imogene Coca Show	NBC
October 2	The Jimmy Durante Show	NBC
October 3	Father Knows Best	CBS
October 4	December Bride	CBS
October 5	The Elgin Hour	ABC
October 7	The Mail Story	ABC
October 7	Climax!	CBS
October 9	The Donald O'Connor Show	NBC
October 15	The Adventures of Rin Tin Tin	ABC
October 18	Producers' Showcase	NBC
October 18	Sherlock Holmes	First-run syndication
October 19	The Halls of Ivy	CBS
October 22	The Jack Carson Show	NBC
October 27	Walt Disney's Disneyland	ABC
November 1	The Ilona Massey Show	DuMont
November 7	Face the Nation	CBS
Unknown date	The Jo Stafford Show	CBS
Unknown date	That's My Boy	CBS

=== Changes of network affiliation ===
Show	Moved from	Moved to
The Ernie Kovacs Show	CBS	DuMont
Better Living TV Theater	ABC	Dumont
The Goldbergs	CBS	Dumont
Boxing From St. Nicholas Arena	NBC	Dumont

=== Ending this year ===
Date	Program	Network	First aired	Notes
January 1	Nine Thirty Curtain	DuMont	October 16, 1953	
January 11	Of Many Things	ABC	October 5, 1953	
January 18	Broadway Television Theatre	WOR-TV	April 14, 1952	
January 18	Keep Posted	DuMont	October 9, 1951	
January 21	Joseph Schildkraut Presents	DuMont	October 28, 1953	
February 5	Guide Right	DuMont	February 25, 1952	
February 2	Melody Street	DuMont	September 25, 1953	
February 24	Answers for Americans	ABC	November 11, 1953	
February 28	The Igor Cassini Show	DuMont	October 25, 1953	
March 9	Pulse of the City	DuMont	September 15, 1953	
April 3	Medallion Theatre	DuMont	July 11, 1953	
April 10	NBA on DuMont	DuMont	September 9, 1953	
April 11	The George Jessel Show	ABC	September 13, 1953	
April 17	On Your Way	DuMont	September 9, 1953	
May	Boxing from Eastern Parkway	DuMont	May 1952	
May	The Abbott and Costello Show	syndication	September 1952	
May 29	Johnny Jupiter	ABC	March 21, 1953 (on DuMont)	
May 29	The Secret Files of Captain Video	DuMont	September 5, 1953	
May 28	The Campbell Playhouse	DuMont	June 6, 1952	
May 30	The Fred Waring Show	CBS	April 17, 1949	
June	ABC Mystery Theater	ABC	October 5, 1951	
June 5	Your Show of Shows	NBC	February 25, 1950	
June 17	Martin Kane, Private Eye	NBC	1949	
June 25	My Friend Irma	CBS	January 8, 1952	
June 27	Man Against Crime	NBC	October 7, 1949 (on CBS)	
June 29	Love Story	DuMont	April 20, 1954	
June 30	Stars on Parade	DuMont	November 4, 1953	
July 2	The Pride of the Family	ABC	October 2, 1953	
July 15	Broadway to Hollywood	DuMont	July 4, 1949	
August 1	Juvenile Jury	NBC	April 3, 1947	
August 2	The Dennis Day Show	NBC	November 23, 1951 (as The RCA Victor Show)	
August 17	Suspense	CBS	January 6, 1949	
August 20	Gamble on Love	DuMont	July 16, 1954	
August 21	Bank on the Stars	NBC	June 20, 1953 (on CBS)	
August 24	Summer Playhouse	NBC	July 6, 1954	Returned in 1957
September 3	The Best in Mystery	NBC	July 16, 1954	
September 8	Night Editor	DuMont	March 14, 1954	
September 8	The Strawhatters	DuMont	May 27, 1953	
September 12	The Plainclothesman	DuMont	October 12, 1949	
September 24	Marge and Jeff	DuMont	September 21, 1953	
September 26	The Web	CBS	July 11, 1950	
October 3	The Man Behind the Badge	CBS	October 11, 1953	
October 10	Author Meets the Critics	DuMont	April 4, 1948 (on NBC)	
October 15	Time Will Tell	DuMont	August 27, 1954	
October 17	The Music Show	DuMont	May 19, 1953	
October 18	The Week in Religion	DuMont	March 16, 1952	
November 16	Rocky Jones, Space Ranger	Syndication	February 23, 1954	
December 5	The Martha Wright Show	ABC	April 18, 1954	
December 24	Meet Corliss Archer	DuMont	April 2, 1954	
December 26	Rocky King Detective	DuMont	January 7, 1950	
December 30	They Stand Accused	DuMont	September 11, 1949	
Unknown date	Ramar of the Jungle	Syndication	October 7, 1952	

=== Television films and specials ===
- December 25 - The Walt Disney Christmas Show on CBS

== Television stations ==
=== Station launches ===
Date	City of License/Market	Station	Channel	Affiliation	Notes/Ref.
January 1	Shreveport, Louisiana	KSLA	12	CBS (primary); ABC/NBC/DuMont (secondary)	
January 1	Traverse City/Cadillac, Michigan	WWTV	9	CBS (primary); DuMont/ABC (secondary)	
January 6	Danville, Virginia	WBTM-TV	24	ABC	
January 13	Mobile, Alabama	WEAR-TV	3	CBS	
January 15	Lansing, Michigan	WMSB	60	NET	Now WMSB on channel 23
February 5	Adams, Massachusetts	WCDC-TV	19	ABC	Satellite station of WTEN/Albany, New York
February 8	Augusta, Georgia	WRDW-TV	12	CBS (primary); ABC (secondary)	
February 8	Fresno, California	KBID-TV	53	Independent	
February 14	Savannah, Georgia	WTOC-TV	11	CBS (primary); NBC/DuMont (secondary)	
February 16	Bay City/Flint, Michigan	WNEM-TV	5	NBC	
February 17	Albany, New York	WTRI	13	CBS	
March 1	Superior, Wisconsin/Duluth, Minnesota	WDSM-TV	6	CBS (primary); ABC (secondary)	
March 9	San Francisco	KSAN-TV	32	Independent	
March 13	Tulsa, Oklahoma	KCEB	23	NBC (primary); DuMont (secondary)	
March 17	Clarksburg, West Virginia	WJPB-TV	15	NBC	
March 17	Fairmont, West Virginia	WJPB-TV	35	ABC (primary); NBC and DuMont (secondary)	
March 20	South Bend, Indiana	WSJV	28	NBC (primary); ABC (secondary)	
March 21	Great Falls, Montana	KFBB-TV	5	CBS (primary); NBC, ABC, and DuMont (secondary)	
March 22	Cheyenne, Wyoming	KFBC-TV	5	ABC (primary); NBC/DuMont (secondary)	
March 23	Fort Myers, Florida	WINK-TV	11	CBS (primary); ABC/NBC/DuMont (secondary)	
March 23	Providence, Rhode Island	WNET	16	ABC (primary); DuMont (Secondary)	
March 27	Jackson, Mississippi	WSLI	12	ABC	
March 28	Manchester, New Hampshire	WMUR-TV	8	ABC	
March 28	San Juan, Puerto Rico	WKAQ-TV	2	Independent	
April 1	Pittsburgh, Pennsylvania	WQED	13	NET	
April 5	San Francisco, California	KQED	9	NET	
April 6	San Francisco, California	KSAN	32	Independent	
April 7	Albany, Georgia	WALB-TV	10	NBC	
April 8	Eau Claire/La Crosse, Wisconsin	WKBT	8	CBS (primary); ABC/DuMont/NBC (secondary)	
April 9	Wilmington, North Carolina	WMFD-TV	6	NBC (primary); DuMont/ABC/CBS (secondary)	
April 10	Weslaco, Texas (Brownsville/McAllen, Texas)	KRGV-TV	5	NBC (primary); ABC (secondary)	
April 15	Des Moines, Iowa	WHO-TV	13	NBC	
April 15	Eugene, Oregon	KVAL	13	NBC (primary); ABC/CBS/DuMont (secondary)	
April 15	Little Rock, Arkansas	KARK-TV	4	NBC (primary); DuMont (secondary)	
April 16	Honolulu, Hawaii	KULA-TV	4	ABC	
April 24	Erie, Pennsylvania	WSEE		CBS	
April 25	Chattanooga, Tennessee	WDEF-TV	12	CBS (primary); ABC/NBC/DuMont (secondary)	
May 1	San Juan, Puerto Rico	WAPA-TV	4	Independent	
May 3	Madison, Wisconsin	WHA-TV	21	NET	
May 15	Mason City, Iowa/Rochester, Minnesota	KGLO-TV	3	CBS (primary); DuMont (secondary)	
May 16	Portland, Maine	WGAN-TV	13	CBS	
May 22	Grand Junction, Colorado	KFXJ-TV	5	CBS (primary); ABC/NBC/DuMont (secondary)	
June 1	Ada, Oklahoma (Sherman, Texas)	KTEN	10	ABC	
July 1	Missoula, Montana	KGVO-TV	13	CBS (primary); ABC/NBC (secondary)	
July 1	Indianapolis, Indiana	WISH-TV	8	ABC (primary); DuMont and NBC (secondary)	
July 1	Orlando, Florida	WDBO-TV	6	CBS (primary); DuMont/ABC/NBC (secondary)	
July 2	Enid/Oklahoma City, Oklahoma	KGEO-TV	5	ABC	License moved to Oklahoma City in 1963
July 4	Huntsville, Alabama	WMSL-TV	48	NBC	
July 8	St. Louis, Missouri	KWK-TV	4	CBS (primary); ABC (secondary)	Later a CBS O&O station (as KMOX-TV) from 1958 to 1986; now CBS affiliate KMOV
July 8	Warrensburg/Sedalia, Missouri (Columbia/Jefferson City, Missouri)	KDRO-TV	6	Independent	
July 12	Fargo, North Dakota	KXJB-TV	4	CBS	
July 15	Salisbury, Maryland	WBOC-TV	16	DuMont	
July 22	Terre Haute, Indiana	WTHI-TV	10	CBS (primary); ABC/NBC/DuMont (secondary)	
July 26	Cincinnati, Ohio	WCET	48	NET	
August 6	Nashville, Tennessee	WLAC-TV	5	CBS	
August 14	Buffalo, New York	WGR-TV	2	NBC (primary); DuMont (secondary)	
August 15	Charleston, West Virginia	WCHS-TV	8	CBS	
August 22	West Palm Beach, Florida	WJNO-TV	5	NBC	
September 2	Durham/Raleigh, North Carolina	WTVD	11	NBC (primary); CBS/ABC (secondary)	
September 6	Stockton/Sacramento, California	KOVR	13	Independent	
September 8	Harrisburg, Pennsylvania	WCMB-TV	27	DuMont	
September 10	Salt Lake City, Utah	KUTV	2	ABC	
September 11	Green Bay, Wisconsin	WMBV-TV	11	NBC	
September 12	Bangor, Maine	WTWO	2	CBS (primary); ABC (secondary)	
September 13	Traverse City/Cadillac, Michigan	WPBN-TV	7	NBC (primary); ABC (secondary)	
September 16	Windsor, Ontario, Canada (Detroit, Michigan, United States)	CKLW-TV	9	CBC Television (primary); DuMont (secondary)	Licensed in Windsor, Ontario, Canada, but serves both sides of the Canada–United States border as per RKO General ownership at time of sign-on
September 18	Asheville, North Carolina	WLOS-TV	13	ABC	
September 18	Muskogee/Tulsa, Oklahoma	KTVX	8	ABC (primary); DuMont (secondary)	
September 20	St. Louis, Missouri	KETC	9	NET	
September 25	Charleston, South Carolina	WUSN-TV	2	NBC	
September 25	Poland Spring/Portland, Maine	WMTW-TV	8	ABC	
September 26	Burlington, Vermont (Plattsburgh, New York)	WCAX-TV	3	CBS	
September 26	Fort Wayne, Indiana	WINT	15	CBS (primary); ABC (secondary)	
September 26	Joplin, Missouri	KODE-TV	12	CBS (primary); ABC (secondary)	
September 29	Alexandria, Louisiana	KALB-TV	5	NBC (primary); CBS/DuMont/ABC (secondary)	
September 29	Lake Charles, Louisiana	KPLC	7	NBC (primary); ABC (secondary)	
October 2	Hartford, Connecticut	WGTH-TV	18	ABC (primary); DuMont (secondary)	
October 3	Cape Girardeau, Missouri	KFVS-TV	12	CBS	
October 10	Sioux City, Iowa	KTIV	4	NBC (primary); ABC/CBS (secondary)	
October 13	Atlanta, Georgia	WQXI-TV	36	Independent	
October 14	Tyler, Texas	KLTV	7	ABC (primary); CBS/NBC (joint primary); DuMont (secondary)	
October 18	Florence, South Carolina	WBTW	13	CBS (primary); ABC (secondary)	
October 19	Wichita, Kansas	KAKE-TV	10	NBC (primary); ABC (secondary)	
October 22	Watertown, New York	WCNY-TV	7	CBS (primary); ABC/NBC (secondary)	
October 23	Wausau, Wisconsin	WSAW-TV	7	CBS (primary); ABC/NBC/DuMont (secondary)	
October 27	Milwaukee, Wisconsin	WISN-TV	12	ABC (primary); DuMont (secondary)	
October 29	Spokane, Washington	KREM	2	ABC (primary); DuMont (secondary)	
November 1	Lincoln, Nebraska	KUON-TV	12	NET	Flagship of Nebraska ETV
November 20	Houston, Texas	KTRK-TV	13	ABC	
November 28	Great Bend/Hays, Kansas (Salina, Kansas)	KCKT	2	NBC	
December	Miami, Florida	WGBS-TV	27	Independent	
December 5	Tulsa, Oklahoma	KVOO-TV	2	NBC	
December 7	Seattle, Washington	KCTS-TV	9	NET	
December 8	Plattsburgh, New York	WIRI	5	NBC (primary); DuMont/ABC (secondary)	
December 14	Oak Hill/Bluefield/Beckley, West Virginia	WOAY-TV	4	ABC (primary); DuMont (secondary)	
December 18	Atlanta, Georgia	WQXI-TV	36	Independent	
December 24	Miami, Florida	WGBS-TV	23	Independent	
December 25	Montgomery, Alabama	WSFA-TV	12	NBC (primary); ABC (secondary)	
December 28	Pasco, Washington	KEPR	19	CBS (primary); NBC/ABC (secondary)	

=== Network affiliation changes ===
Date	City of license/Market	Station	Channel	Old affiliation	New affiliation	Notes/Ref.
March	Duluth, Minnesota	WFTV	38	CBS (primary); NBC (secondary)	ABC (primary); DuMont (secondary)	
May 15	Austin/Rochester, Minnesota	KMMT	6	CBS (primary); DuMont (secondary)	ABC (primary); DuMont (secondary)	
May 15	Rochester, Minnesota	KROC-TV	10	NBC (primary); DuMont/CBS/ABC (primary)	NBC (primary); CBS/DuMont (secondary)	
May 16	Houston, Texas	KUHT	8	Educational independent	NET	
August 6	Nashville, Tennessee	WSIX-TV	8 (now on 2)	CBS (primary); ABC (secondary)	ABC (exclusive)	
August 6	Nashville, Tennessee	WSM-TV	4	NBC (primary); ABC/DuMont (secondary)	NBC (primary); DuMont (secondary)	Became an exclusive NBC affiliate upon the closure of DuMont in 1956.
Unknown date	Oklahoma City, Oklahoma	KMPT (recalled from KLPR)	19	ABC	DuMont	

=== Station closures ===
Date	City of license/Market	Station	Channel	Affiliation	First air date	Notes/Ref.
February 28	Kansas City, Missouri	KCTY	25	DuMont	June 6, 1953	
March 13	Lincoln, Nebraska	KFOR-TV	10	CBS	May 31, 1953	Merged with KOLN-TV
March 31	Little Rock, Arkansas	KRTV	17	CBS (primary); NBC/ABC/DuMont (secondary)	April 5, 1953	Studio purchased by KATV
April	Duluth, Minnesota	WFTV	38	NBC/CBS (joint primary); ABC/DuMont (secondary)	1953	
April 2	Festus/St. Louis, Missouri	KACY	14	Independent	October 31, 1953	
April 21	Pueblo, Colorado	KDZA-TV	3	DuMont	March 16, 1953	
April 29	Matamoros, Tamaulipas, Mexico (Brownsville/McAllen, Texas, United States)	XELD-TV	7	CBS (primary); ABC (secondary)	September 15, 1951	
April 30	Flint, Michigan	WTAC-TV	16	ABC (primary); DuMont (secondary)		
May 1	Monroe, Louisiana	KFAZ	43	Independent	August 11, 1953	
May 5	Phoenix, Arizona	KOY-TV	10	ABC	October 19, 1953	Merged with time-sharing station KOOL-TV, which went full-time on channel
May 17	Atlantic City, New Jersey	WFPG-TV	46	NBC (primary); CBS/ABC/DuMont (secondary)	December 21, 1954	
June 9	Kansas City, Missouri	WHB-TV	9	CBS	August 2, 1953	Merged with time-sharing station KMBC-TV, which went full-time on channel
July 2	Pittsburgh, Pennsylvania	WKJF-TV	53	Independent	July 14, 1953	Returned to the air in 1969 as WPGH-TV
July 11	Duluth, Minnesota	WFTV	38	NBC (primary); CBS/ABC/DuMont (secondary)	May 31, 1953	
July 15	Fresno, California	KBID-TV	53	Independent	February 8, 1954	
July 17	Princeton, Indiana	WRAY-TV	52	Independent	December 6, 1953	
August 1	Mobile, Alabama	WKAB-TV	48	CBS, DuMont	December 30, 1952	
August 3	St. Louis, Missouri	KSTM-TV	36	DuMont	October 20, 1953	
September 19	Butte, Montana	KOPR-TV	4	CBS (primary); ABC (secondary)	August 23, 1953	
October 15	Elmira, New York	WTVE	24	DuMont, CBS, ABC	June 15, 1953	Tower collapse in Hurricane Hazel. Returned May 6, 1956 – February 13, 1957
October 23	Tyler, Texas	KETX	19	NBC (primary); CBS/ABC/DuMont (secondary)	August 24, 1953	
December 16	Portland, Maine	WPMT	53	DuMont	August 27, 1953	
December 25	Tulsa, Oklahoma	KCEB	23	NBC (primary); DuMont (secondary)	March 13, 1954	
December 31	Danville, Virginia	WBTM-TV	24	ABC	January 6, 1954	
Unknown date	Flint, Michigan	WTAC-TV	16	ABC (primary); DuMont (secondary)	1953	

== Sources ==
- Collins, Ace (1993). Lassie: A Dog's Life. New York: Penguin Books. ISBN 978-0-14-023183-0.
- Stevens, Val (February 9, 1964). "News of TV and Radio" (PDF). The New York Times.
