= 1953–54 United States network television schedule =

The following is the 1953–54 network television schedule for the four major English language commercial broadcast networks in the United States. The schedule covers primetime hours from September 1953 through March 1954. The schedule is followed by a list per network of returning series, new series, and series cancelled after the 1952–53 season.

Despite hit filmed programs such as I Love Lucy, both William S. Paley of CBS and David Sarnoff of NBC were said to be determined to keep most programming on their networks live. Filmed programs were said to be inferior to the spontaneous nature of live television. Thus, NBC and CBS continued to schedule many live programs, including two new 1953 fall NBC series The Dave Garroway Show and Bonino. According to Brooks and Marsh (2007), Garroway's show "was faced with overwhelming competition from Mama and Ozzie & Harriet, which were running opposite on CBS and ABC, and it only lasted a single season". Bonino did not even last the full season. CBS had more luck with new live programs Person to Person and My Favorite Husband (which would later make the switch to film).

ABC, perennially in third or fourth place among the four U.S. television networks, had been on the verge of bankruptcy, but the February 1953 merger of United Paramount Theaters with ABC had given ABC a $30 million cash infusion. ABC revamped its schedule for Fall 1953 with big-budget programs. New ABC programs included Make Room for Daddy, and an ABC version of NBC's popular Kraft Television Theatre; the strategy was designed to "take on CBS and NBC with a strong schedule".

In contrast to ABC's revamped schedule, DuMont's Fall 1953 prime time schedule looked weak, with programs that were "doomed from the start by third-rate scripts and cheap production." The 1953–54 season would be the last year DuMont was able to schedule nearly 20 hours of programming in prime time. By the 1954–55 season, DuMont would be forced to cut back its schedule, while the other three networks continued to expand.

During the 1953 season, both DuMont and ABC "made sporadic efforts to compete for the daytime audience, but faced so many problems just filling prime time that they found it much more efficient to focus primarily on weekend sports". DuMont paid $1.3 million in 1953 for the rights to broadcast National Football League games in prime time; starting December 12, DuMont also broadcast a series of NBA basketball games, the first time pro basketball was seen regularly on network TV. Both DuMont and ABC "were especially aggressive in pursuit of sports broadcasts because they were desperately in need of special attractions to bring in viewers".

Each of the 30 highest-rated shows is listed with its rank and rating as determined by Nielsen Media Research.

Yellow indicates the programs in the top 10 for the season.
Cyan indicates the programs in the top 20 for the season.
Magenta indicates the programs in the top 30 for the season.

== Sunday ==
Network		7:00 PM	7:30 PM	8:00 PM	8:30 PM	9:00 PM	9:30 PM	10:00 PM	10:30 PM
ABC		You Asked For It	The Frank Leahy Show (7:30) / Notre Dame Football (7:45)			The Walter Winchell Show (9:00) / The Orchid Award (9:15)	Jukebox Jury		Billy Graham's Hour of Decision (10:30) / Local (10:45)
CBS		Quiz Kids	The Jack Benny Show (16/33.3) / Private Secretary (24/30.3)	Toast of the Town (17/33.0)		The Fred Waring Show / General Electric Theater (27/29.9)	The Man Behind the Badge	The Web	What's My Line? (28/29.6)
NBC		The Paul Winchell Show	Mister Peepers	The Colgate Comedy Hour (10/36.2) (Tied with This Is Your Life) / The Bob Hope Show (once a month)		The Philco Television Playhouse (19/32.5) / Goodyear Television Playhouse (22/31.0)		Letter to Loretta	Man Against Crime
DMN	Fall	Local	Washington Exclusive	Local		Rocky King, Inside Detective	The Plainclothesman	Dollar a Second	Man Against Crime
DMN	Summer	Local	Washington Exclusive	Local		Rocky King, Inside Detective	The Plainclothesman	Dollar a Second	Better Living TV Theatre

- On CBS, The Jack Benny Program alternated with Private Secretary every third week. As of February 14, 1954, Letter to Loretta on NBC became The Loretta Young Show.
- On April 18, 1954, The Martha Wright Show replaced The Jane Pickens Show, starring vocalist Jane Pickens Langley, at the 9:15 p.m. time slot on Sundays on ABC. Pickens had previously replaced The Orchid Award.

== Monday ==
Network	7:00 PM	7:30 PM	8:00 PM	8:30 PM	9:00 PM	9:30 PM	10:00 PM	10:30 PM
ABC	The Walter Winchell Show (7:00) / John Daly and the News (7:15)	Jamie	Sky King	Of Many Things	Junior Press Conference	The Big Picture	This Is the Life	Local
CBS	Local	Douglas Edwards with the News (7:30) / The Perry Como Show (7:45)	The George Burns and Gracie Allen Show (20/32.4)	Arthur Godfrey's Talent Scouts (3/43.6) (Tied with You Bet Your Life)	I Love Lucy (1/58.8)	The Red Buttons Show (12/35.3)	Studio One	
NBC	Local	The Arthur Murray Party (7:30) / Camel News Caravan (7:45)	Name That Tune	The Voice of Firestone	The Dennis Day Show	Robert Montgomery Presents		Who Said That?
DMN	Captain Video (7:00) / Marge and Jeff (7:15)	Local	Twenty Questions	The Big Issue	Boxing From Eastern Parkway			

- On April 26, 1954, The Tony Martin Show replaced The Arthur Murray Party on NBC. Both programs were fifteen minutes in length.
- From April 6, 1953, to December 7, 1953, DuMont aired Monodrama Theater Monday through Friday at 11pm ET.

== Tuesday ==
Network		7:00 PM	7:30 PM	8:00 PM	8:30 PM	9:00 PM	9:30 PM	10:00 PM	10:30 PM
ABC		Local (7:00) / John Daly and the News (7:15)	Cavalcade of America	Local		Make Room for Daddy	The United States Steel Hour / The Motorola Television Hour		The Name's the Same
CBS	Fall	Local	Douglas Edwards with the News (7:30) / The Jane Froman Show (7:45)	The Gene Autry Show	The Red Skelton Show	This Is Show Business	Suspense	Danger	See It Now
CBS	Summer	Local	Douglas Edwards with the News (7:30) / The Jane Froman Show (7:45)	The Gene Autry Show	The Red Skelton Show	This Is Show Business	Suspense	Danger	The Blue Angel
NBC	Fall	Local	The Dinah Shore Show (7:30) / Camel News Caravan (7:45)	The Buick-Berle Show* (5/40.2)		Fireside Theatre (9/36.4)	Armstrong Circle Theater	Judge for Yourself	On the Line with Considine (10:30) / It Happened in Sports (10:45)
NBC	Summer	Local	The Dinah Shore Show (7:30) / Camel News Caravan (7:45)	The Buick-Berle Show* (5/40.2)		Summer Playhouse	Armstrong Circle Theater	Judge for Yourself	On the Line with Considine (10:30) / It Happened in Sports (10:45)
DMN		Captain Video (7:00) / Marge and Jeff (7:15)	Local	Life Is Worth Living	Pantomime Quiz	Local			

(*) Formerly Texaco Star Theater

On ABC, The United States Steel Hour alternated with The Motorola Television Hour.

On NBC, Summer Playhouse was a summer anthology series made up of repeats of episodes from other anthologyseries.

== Wednesday ==
Network		7:00 PM	7:30 PM	8:00 PM	8:30 PM	9:00 PM	9:30 PM	10:00 PM	10:30 PM
ABC		Local (7:00) / John Daly and the News (7:15)	Inspector Mark Saber – Homicide Squad	At Issue (8:00) / Through the Curtain (8:15)	Answers for Americans	Take It from Me	Dr. I.Q.	Wrestling From Rainbo Arena	
CBS		Local	Douglas Edwards with the News (7:30) / The Perry Como Show (7:45)	Arthur Godfrey and His Friends (6/38.9)		Strike It Rich	I've Got a Secret	Pabst Blue Ribbon Bouts (10:00) (23/30.9) / Sports Spot (10:45)	
NBC		Local	Coke Time with Eddie Fisher (7:30) / Camel News Caravan (7:45)	I Married Joan (25/30.2) (Tied with Mama)	My Little Margie	Kraft Television Theater (21/31.3)		This Is Your Life (10/36.2) (Tied with The Colgate Comedy Hour)	Local
DMN	Fall	Captain Video (7:00) / Marge and Jeff (7:15)	Local	The Johns Hopkins Science Review	Joseph Schildkraut Presents	Colonel Humphrey Flack	On Your Way	Stars on Parade	The Music Show
DMN	Winter	Captain Video (7:00) / Marge and Jeff (7:15)	Local	The Johns Hopkins Science Review	Joseph Schildkraut Presents	Colonel Humphrey Flack	On Your Way	The Music Show	
DMN	Spring	Captain Video (7:00) / Marge and Jeff (7:15)	Local	The Johns Hopkins Science Review	Joseph Schildkraut Presents	Colonel Humphrey Flack	On Your Way	The Music Show	Better Living TV Theatre
DMN	Summer	Captain Video (7:00) / Marge and Jeff (7:15)	Local	The Johns Hopkins Science Review	Joseph Schildkraut Presents	Colonel Humphrey Flack	On Your Way	The Music Show	

== Thursday ==
Network		7:00 PM	7:30 PM	8:00 PM	8:30 PM	9:00 PM	9:30 PM	10:00 PM	10:30 PM
ABC		Local (7:00) / John Daly and the News (7:15)	The Lone Ranger	Quick As a Flash	Where's Raymond?	Back That Fact	Kraft Television Theater		Local
CBS	Fall	Local	Douglas Edwards with the News (7:30) / Jane Froman’s U.S.A. Canteen (7:45)	Meet Mr. McNutley	Four Star Playhouse	Lux Video Theatre	Big Town	Philip Morris Playhouse / The Public Defender*	Place the Face
CBS	Summer	Local	Douglas Edwards with the News (7:30) / Jane Froman’s U.S.A. Canteen (7:45)	Meet Mr. McNutley	Four Star Playhouse	Lux Video Theatre	Big Town	The Telltale Clue	Place the Face
NBC	Fall	Local	The Dinah Shore Show (7:30) / Camel News Caravan (7:45)	You Bet Your Life (3/43.6) (Tied with Arthur Godfrey's Talent Scouts)	Treasury Men in Action (15/33.9)	Dragnet (2/53.2)	Ford Theatre (7/38.8)	Martin Kane, Private Eye (29/29.5) (Tied with The Big Story and Your Hit Parade)	Local
NBC	Summer	Local	The Dinah Shore Show (7:30) / Camel News Caravan (7:45)	You Bet Your Life (3/43.6) (Tied with Arthur Godfrey's Talent Scouts)	Treasury Men in Action (15/33.9)	Dragnet (2/53.2)	Ford Theatre (7/38.8)	The Marriage (In COLOR)	Local
DMN		Captain Video (7:00) / Marge and Jeff (7:15)	Local	Pro Football Highlights	Broadway to Hollywood – Headline Clues	What's the Story	Local		

* starting March 11

== Friday ==
Network		7:00 PM	7:30 PM	8:00 PM	8:30 PM	9:00 PM	9:30 PM	10:00 PM	10:30 PM
ABC		Local (7:00) / John Daly and the News (7:15)	The Stu Erwin Show*	The Adventures of Ozzie and Harriet	The Pepsi-Cola Playhouse	The Pride of the Family	The Comeback Story	Showcase Theater	Local
CBS	Fall	Local	Douglas Edwards with the News (7:30) / The Perry Como Show (7:45)	Mama (25/30.2) (Tied with I Married Joan)	Topper	Schlitz Playhouse of Stars	Our Miss Brooks (14/34.2)	My Friend Irma	Person to Person
CBS	Summer	Local	Douglas Edwards with the News (7:30) / The Perry Como Show (7:45)	Mama (25/30.2) (Tied with I Married Joan)	Topper	Schlitz Playhouse of Stars	Our Miss Brooks (14/34.2)	Viceroy Star Theatre	Person to Person
NBC		Local	Coke Time with Eddie Fisher (7:30) / Camel News Caravan (7:45)	The Dave Garroway Show	The Life of Riley (13/35.0)	The Big Story (29/29.5) (Tied with Martin Kane, Private Eye and Your Hit Parade)	Campbell Soundstage	Gillette Cavalcade of Sports (10:00) (18/32.7) / Greatest Fights of the Century (10:45)	
DMN		Captain Video (7:00) / Marge and Jeff (7:15)	Local	Front Page Detective	Melody Street	Life Begins at Eighty	Nine Thirty Curtain	Chance of a Lifetime	Down You Go

* also known as Trouble with Father

== Saturday ==
Network		7:00 PM	7:30 PM	8:00 PM	8:30 PM	9:00 PM	9:30 PM	10:00 PM	10:30 PM
ABC		Paul Whiteman's TV Teen Club	Leave It to the Girls	Talent Patrol	Music at the Meadowbrook	The Saturday Night Fights (9:00) / Fight Talk (9:45)		Madison Square Garden Highlights	Local
CBS	Fall	Meet Millie	Beat the Clock	The Jackie Gleason Show (8/38.1)		Two for the Money	My Favorite Husband	Medallion Theatre	The Revlon Mirror Theater
CBS	Spring	Meet Millie	Beat the Clock	The Jackie Gleason Show (8/38.1)		Two for the Money	My Favorite Husband	That's My Boy	The Revlon Mirror Theater
NBC		Watch Mr. Wizard	Ethel and Albert	Bonino	The Original Amateur Hour	Your Show of Shows / The Martha Raye Show (once a month)			Your Hit Parade (29/29.5) (Tied with The Big Story and Martin Kane, Private Eye)
DMN		Local		National Football League Professional Football					

== By network ==
=== ABC ===
Returning Series

- The Adventures of Ozzie and Harriet
- The Big Picture
- Billy Graham's Hour of Decision
- Cavalcade of America (moved from NBC)
- The Dotty Mack Show (moved from DuMont)
- Fight Talk
- Inspector Mark Saber — Homicide Squad
- Junior Press Conference
- Leave It to the Girls
- The Lone Ranger
- Madison Square Garden Highlights
- Music at Meadowbrook
- The Name's the Same
- The Orchid Award
- Quick As a Flash
- Paul Whiteman's TV Teen Club
- The Saturday Night Fights
- Sky King
- The Stu Erwin Show
- Talent Patrol
- This Is the Life
- The Walter Winchell Show
- Wrestling From Rainbo Arena
- You Asked For It

New Series

- Answers for Americans
- At Issue
- Back That Fact
- The Big Picture
- Center Stage *
- The Comeback Story
- Dr. I.Q.
- The Ern Westmore Hollywood Glamour Show
- The Frank Leahy Show
- The George Jessel Show
- Jamie
- John Daly and the News
- Jukebox Jury
- Kraft Television Theatre
- Leave It to the Girls
- Make Room for Daddy
- The Martha Wright Show
- The Motorola Television Hour
- Notre Dame Football
- Of Many Things
- On Your Way
- The Pepsi-Cola Playhouse
- The Pride of the Family
- Quick as a Flash
- Showcase Theater
- Talent Patrol
- The Trouble With Father
- Through the Curtain
- The United States Steel Hour
- Where's Raymond?

Not returning from 1952–53:

- The Adventures of Ellery Queen
- All-Star News
- America in View
- Anywhere U.S.A.
- Back That Fact
- The Beulah Show
- Both Sides
- Fear and Fancy
- Feature Playhouse
- Hollywood Screen Test
- Live Like a Millionaire
- On Guard
- Perspectives
- Plymouth Playhouse
- Tales of Tomorrow
- This is the Life Presents "The Fisher Family"
- United or Not?

=== CBS ===
Returning Series

- Arthur Godfrey and His Friends
- Arthur Godfrey's Talent Scouts
- Beat the Clock
- Big Town
- The Blue Angel
- Danger
- Douglas Edwards and the News
- Four Star Playhouse
- The Fred Waring Show
- The Garry Moore Show
- The Gene Autry Show
- General Electric Theater
- The George Burns and Gracie Allen Show
- I Love Lucy
- I've Got a Secret
- The Jack Benny Show
- The Jackie Gleason Show
- The Jane Froman Show
- Jane Froman's U.S.A. Canteen
- Lux Video Theatre
- Mama
- Medallion Theatre
- Meet Millie
- My Friend Irma
- Omnibus
- Our Miss Brooks
- Pabst Blue Ribbon Bouts
- The Perry Como Show
- Place the Face
- The Red Buttons Show
- The Red Skelton Show (moved from NBC)
- The Revlon Mirror Theater (moved from NBC)
- Schlitz Playhouse of Stars
- See It Now
- Sports Spot
- Strike It Rich
- Studio One
- Suspense
- This Is Show Business
- Toast of the Town
- Topper
- Two for the Money
- The Web
- What in the World?
- What's My Line
- Your Play Time

New Series

- The Blue Angel *
- The Jo Stafford Show *
- Life with Father
- The Man Behind the Badge
- Meet Mr. McNutley
- My Favorite Husband
- Pentagon U.S.A.
- Person to Person
- The Public Defender
- The Telltale Clue *
- That's My Boy *

Not returning from 1952–53:

- Amos 'n' Andy
- Balance Your Budget
- Battle of the Ages
- Biff Baker, U.S.A.
- City Hospital
- Crime Syndicated
- Footlights Theater
- Heaven for Betsy
- Jane Froman's U.S.A. Canteen
- The Larry Storch Show
- Leave It to Larry
- Life with Luigi
- Mr. and Mrs. North
- Racket Squad
- Willys Theatre Presenting Ben Hecht's Tales of the City
- Your Jeweler's Showcase

=== DuMont ===
Returning series

- Boxing from Eastern Parkway
- Broadway to Hollywood – Headline Clues
- Captain Video
- Chance of a Lifetime
- Concert Tonight
- Down You Go
- Front Page Detective
- Guide Right
- The Johns Hopkins Science Review
- Life Begins at Eighty
- Life is Worth Living
- Man Against Crime (moved from CBS)
- The Music Show
- Pantomime Quiz
- The Plainclothesman
- Pro Football Highlights
- Rocky King, Inside Detective
- The Strawhatters
- They Stand Accused
- Twenty Questions
- Washington Exclusive
- What's the Story?
- What's Your Bid?

New series

- Better Living TV theatre *
- The Big Issue
- Colonel Humphrey Flack
- Concert Tonight *
- Dollar a Second
- Gamble on Love *
- The Igor Cassini Show
- Joseph Schildkraut Presents
- Love Story *
- Marge and Jeff
- Melody Street
- National Football League Professional Football
- Night Editor *
- Nine Thirty Curtain
- On Your Way
- Opera Cameos
- Pulse of the City
- Stars on Parade
- The Stranger

Not returning from 1952–53:

- The Arthur Murray Party
- Author Meets the Critics
- The Big Idea
- Blind Date
- Charlie Wild, Private Detective
- Dark of Night
- Drama at Eight
- Football Sidelines
- Georgetown University Forum
- Guide Right
- Jimmy Hughes, Rookie Cop
- Keep Posted
- The Old American Barn Dance
- One Woman's Experience
- The Pet Shop
- The Power of Women
- Report Card for Parents
- Stage a Number
- Steve Randall
- This Is the Life Presents "The Fisher Family"
- Trash or Treasure
- Where Was I?
- Wisdom of the Ages
- Wrestling From Marigold
- Youth on the March

=== NBC ===
Returning Series

- Armstrong Circle Theatre
- The Arthur Murray Party
- Bank on the Stars (moved from CBS)
- The Big Story
- The Buick-Berle Show
- Camel News Caravan
- Cameo Theatre
- Campbell Soundstage
- Coke Time with Eddie Fisher
- The Colgate Comedy Hour
- The Dave Garroway Show
- The Dennis Day Show
- The Dinah Shore Show
- Dragnet
- Ethel and Albert
- Fireside Theatre
- Ford Theatre
- Gillette Cavalcade of Sports
- Goodyear Television Playhouse
- Greatest Fights of the Century
- I Married Joan
- It Happened In Sports
- The Kate Smith Evening Hour
- Kraft Television Theatre
- The Life of Riley
- Man Against Crime (moved from CBS)
- Martin Kane, Private Eye
- Mister Peepers
- My Little Margie
- Name That Tune
- On the Line with Considine
- The Original Amateur Hour
- The Paul Winchell Show
- The Philco Television Playhouse
- Robert Montgomery Presents
- Texaco Star Theater
- This Is Your Life
- Treasury Men in Action
- The Voice of Firestone
- Watch Mr. Wizard
- Who Said That?
- You Bet Your Life
- Your Favorite Story
- Your Hit Parade
- Your Show of Shows

New Series

- The Best in Mystery *
- The Bob Hope Show
- Bonino
- Cheer Television Theatre *
- The Dave Garroway Show
- The Dennis Day Show
- Inner Sanctum
- It Happened in Sports
- Judge for Yourself
- Letter to Loretta
- Man Against Crime
- The Marriage *
- The Martha Raye Show
- The Spike Jones Show *
- Summer Playhouse *
- The World of Mr. Sweeney

Not returning from 1952–53:

- The Aldrich Family
- The Buick Circus Hour
- The Doctor
- Embassy Club
- Eye Witness
- Ford Festival
- Gang Busters
- Gulf Playhouse
- The Herman Hickmann Show
- My Hero
- My Son Jeep
- The RCA Victor Show Starring Dennis Day
- Scott Music Hall
- Short Short Dramas
- Those Two
- Victory at Sea

Note: The * indicates that the program was introduced in midseason.
