= Getting Married =

Getting Married may refer to:

- Getting Married (play), a 1908 play by George Bernard Shaw
- Getting Married (collection), a volume of short stories by August Strindberg
- Getting Married (1926 film), a Swedish silent drama film
- Getting Married (1955 film), a Swedish drama film directed by Anders Henrikson
- Getting Married (1978 film), a television film
- "Getting Married", a song by Nas from the album Street's Disciple

== See also ==
- Marriage (disambiguation)
- Get Married (disambiguation)
