= Summer Playhouse =

Summer Playhouse may refer to:

- Summer Playhouse (1954 TV series), an American anthology television series broadcast in 1954 and 1957 on NBC
- Summer Playhouse (1964 TV series), an American anthology television series broadcast in 1964 and 1965 on CBS
- CBS Summer Playhouse, an American anthology television series broadcast in 1987, 1988, and 1989 on CBS
