= Marriage (disambiguation) =

Marriage is a socially or ritually recognized union, or legal contract between spouses.

Marriage may also refer to:

== Film ==
- Marriage (1927 film), an American drama film
- Marriage (1928 film), an Austrian-German silent film
- Marriage (1936 film), a Soviet comedy film
- Marriage (1954 film), an Italian comedy film
- Marriages (1998 film), an Italian film
- Marriages (2001 film), a Canadian film directed by Catherine Martin
- The Marriage (2017 film), a Kosovan film
- Vivah (English title: Marriage), a 2006 Indian film by Sooraj R. Barjatya

== Television ==
- The Marriage (American TV series), an American series from the 1950s
- The Marriage (Burmese TV series), a 2023 Burmese series
- Married (TV series), an American comedy series which aired from 2014 to 2015
- Marriage (TV series) a British four-part series, broadcast in 2022
- "Marriage" (Men Behaving Badly), a 1994 episode
- "Marriage" (Not Going Out), a 2009 episode
- "Marriage" (The Old Guys), a 2009 episode
- "Marriage" (Stewart Lee's Comedy Vehicle), a 2014 episode

== Literature ==
- Marriage (novel), a 1912 novel by H. G. Wells
- Marriage (play), an 1842 play by Nikolai Gogol
- The Marriage (Gombrowicz play), a 1948 play by Witold Gombrowicz
- "Marriage", a poem by Gregory Corso

== Music ==
- Marriages (band), a rock band from Los Angeles, California
- Marriage (Attack in Black album), 2007
- Marriage (Deap Vally album), 2021
- Marriage (Deen album), 2012
- The Marriage (Martinů), a 1953 opera by Bohuslav Martinů, based on Gogol's play
- The Marriage (Mussorgsky) or Zhenitba, a Russian opera by Modest Mussorgsky, based on Gogol's play
- "The Marriage", a song by Patrick Wolf from The Magic Position

== Other uses ==
- The Marriage (radio), an American radio series
- The Marriage (video game), a 2006 art game developed by Rod Humble
- Marriage (card game), a Nepali matching card game

== See also ==
- Cohabitation
- Common-law marriage
- Interpersonal relationship
- Mariage (disambiguation)
