= Nelson Case =

American radio and television announcer

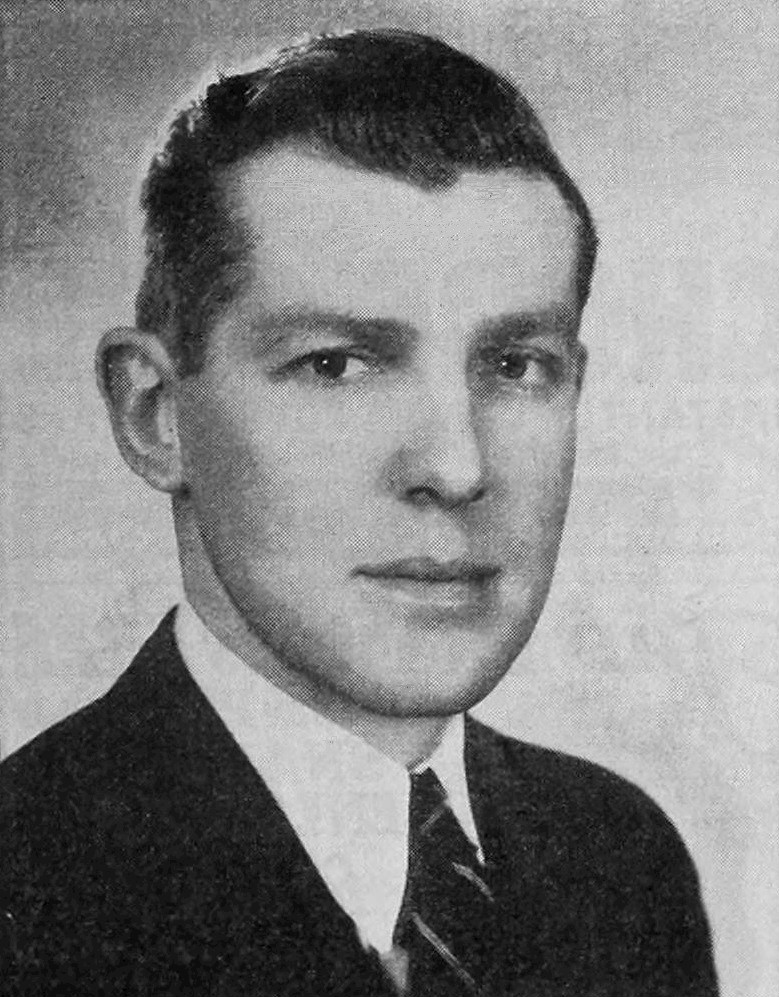
- Nelson Case in 1935
- Born: February 3, 1910; Long Beach, California, United States
- Died: March 23, 1976 (aged 66); Center Bridge, Pennsylvania, United States
- Occupations: Radio and television announcer

Nelson Case (February 3, 1910 – March 23, 1976) was an American radio and television announcer.

Case was the son of Walter and Ethel Case. His father was a newspaperman, and his mother was a driving force in the Long Beach Community Players. He attended Long Beach Polytechnic High School and first worked as an announcer on the school's radio station. One of his early ventures into entertainment came when "as a youngster in Long Beach, he sang and played the uke for a band called the Sunset Symphonic Six."

He was a graduate of the College of William & Mary, in Williamsburg, Virginia, where he met his future wife.

Although Case was best known for being an announcer on popular radio and television programs (in 1953, he was "on radio 20 times a week, on TV three"), a 1941 newspaper article noted that he "covered everything from news and special events to sports." His assignments included "Miss America pageants ... Davis Cup tennis matches and presidential inaugurations." One of his more unusual assignments came February 6, 1936, when he described a simulated air attack on New York City. With United States Army planes in the roles of bombers and defenders, Case flew in a plane to "describe the combat from the air. He [was] attached to the 'defense' squadron ..."

== Career ==
=== Early years ===
Case's career as a professional entertainer began when, at 15, he was a pianist at radio station KFON in Long Beach, California. At 16, he started an orchestra and performed with it over KFON. In 1927, he moved to KGER (also in Long Beach) as an announcer and singer. He also worked at KFI, KFWB, and KGFJ in Los Angeles. Even after taking a position at a network, Case had a weekly program "for his baritone solo work" on KGO in San Francisco.

In 1931, Case was listed as "announcer and singer with the Pacific vagabonds" on an afternoon program on WJZ-NBC.

=== Network radio ===
Case joined NBC in 1931 as an announcer in San Francisco. In 1934, he moved to New York City to be on the NBC staff there. During his years on network radio the programs he announced for included Criminal Casebook, The Story of Mary Marlin, Marriage Club, Inc., The Lanny Ross Show, Against The Storm, Lone Journey, Charlie and Jessie, Crime Doctor, Great Moments From Great Plays, N.T.G. and His Girls, Ask-It-Basket, Wheatenaville, Johnny Presents, Hercule Poirot, Lowell Thomas Show, The Ford Theater, The A&P Gypsies, The Adventures of the Thin Man, Big Sister, Carefree Carnival, The Carnation Contented Hour, The Coty Playgirl, The Dave Garroway Show, The Ed Sullivan Show, Exploring The Unknown, Hilda Hope, MD, Husbands And Wives, Kate Hopkins, Angel of Mercy, Life Can Be Beautiful, Mary And Bob's True Story Hour, NBC Symphony Orchestra, Orphans of Divorce, Philip Morris Playhouse, The Right Thing To Do, The Road of Life, Sky Blazers, True Story Time, and Vaughn Monroe Show.

Case also was announcer for musical broadcasts by bandleaders, including Wayne King, Ray Noble, Phil Spitalny and Guy Lombardo.

=== Television ===
During his years on television, the programs Case announced for included What's It Worth?, Trash Or Treasure? The Ford Television Theater, Lowell Thomas, The Ken Murray Show, Pulitzer Prize Playhouse, Robert Montgomery Presents, The Red Buttons Show, Road of Life, Omnibus, Wide Wide World, State Trooper, Jane Wyman Theater, Sammy Kaye Show, Tic-Tac-Dough, Fibber McGee and Molly, True Story, M Squad, The Arthur Murray Party, Saber of London, and Modern Romances. Case was also host on NBC of Summer Playhouse 1954 and Sneak Preview in 1956.

=== Later years ===
In 1962, Case was one of six people forming Metroscope, a service that furnished recorded commentaries to local radio stations.

=== Style ===
Case became was what he called "a soft sell announcer," using a natural, conversational delivery that he said was "the opposite of the shouting, hammering type." Early in his career, he responded to a newspaper's questionnaire by writing, in part:

The days when a program was introduced by stentorian blasts from the announcer are over. Nowadays he tries to be pleasant, cordial and friendly with his chatter .. both in introducing musical numbers and in giving commercial announcements.

A newspaper columnist wrote, "[H]e broadcasts a feeling of sincerity unlike anyone else and his personality is broadcast to the listener and viewer who gets a feeling, 'Now, there's a guy I can trust.'"

=== Military ===
Case was active in the Civil Air Patrol, being promoted to Flight commander in 1942. At one point he filled in for a sick colleague on a radio broadcast, hurried to Roosevelt Field to practice maneuvers with the CAP, then dashed back to the studio for a rehearsal and broadcast.

During World War II, Case was an aviator in the United States Navy for three years. He later was a Lieutenant Commander in the United States Navy Reserve.

== Professional organizations ==
In 1932, Case was elected president of a group of announcers "within the NBC headquarters in San Francisco." A news brief noted, "Association officials say that they are not organized as a union but are merely grouped together to ask the network for a raise in salaries when they are given spot announcements to make."

Later, in New York, organization became more official and Case became more involved. In 1947, he was elected to a one-year term on the board of directors of the American Federation of Radio Artists' New York local. In 1948, he was elected president of the New York local and a vice-president of AFRA at the national level. For 1949, he was re-elected to the New York local board and re-elected president of the local.

== Hobbies ==
Case enjoyed writing fiction and composing music. He also was described as "a great record fan." When he bought a high fidelity sound system, he bought 130 LP records to play on it. He accumulated "such a tremendous collection of jazz records that record companies, compiling albums of old-time jazz, often do their research in his library."

He was also a writer. In 1952, he wrote a book, History of the Brooklyn Dodgers. In 1953, his article, "Can TV Commercials Be Improved?," was published in Academy Magazine.

In the 1960s, Case and his wife lived on an 84-acre farm in Bucks County, Pennsylvania, where he raised Angus cattle as a hobby.

== Family ==
Case married Sarah Lee, a descendant of Robert E. Lee and Ethan Allen. They had a daughter, Virginia Lee, and a son, Nelson Jr. They were divorced in 1947. His second marriage, on September 5, 1947, was to Nondas Metcalfe, an actress and writer. They moved to New Hope, Pennsylvania, in 1958 and still made their home there when he died.

== Death ==
Case died of a heart attack March 23, 1976, in Doylestown Hospital in Doylestown, Pennsylvania. He was survived by his wife, his son, and his daughter.
