= Get Married =

Get Married can refer to any of the following:

- Marriage
- Get Married (TV series), an American TV series on Lifetime Television
- Get Married (film), a 2007 Indonesian film by Hanung Bramantyo

== See also ==
- Getting Married (disambiguation)
