= Bobby Sherwood =

American guitarist and trumpeter (1914–1981)

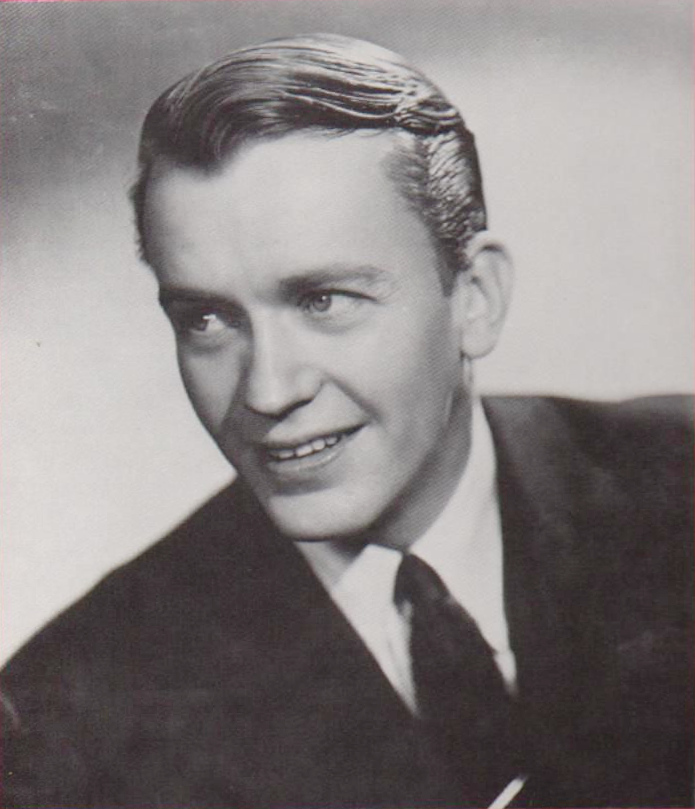
- Bobby Sherwood
- Born: Robert J. Sherwood Jr. May 30, 1914; Indianapolis, Indiana, U.S.
- Died: January 23, 1981 (aged 66); Auburn, Massachusetts
- Occupations: Musician, bandleader, radio host, actor
- Children: Michael; Billy
- Musical career
- Genres: Jazz, swing
- Instruments: Guitar, trumpet
- Labels: Capitol, Mercury, Coral

Robert J. Sherwood Jr. (May 30, 1914 – January 23, 1981) was an American guitarist, trumpeter, bandleader, actor and radio host.

== Early years ==
Sherwood's parents were Bob and Gail Sherwood. When they lived in Kokomo, Indiana, Bob operated a movie theater, and Gail "organized an orchestra which was among the first to play popular syncopated music." Bobby Sherwood began playing banjo with that group when he was 12 years old.

== Career ==
When he was twenty-two, he replaced Eddie Lang as the guitarist for Bing Crosby in 1933 and remained with Crosby until the early 1940s. He worked as a studio musician in Hollywood for MGM.

Beginning on October 2, 1940, he was the bandleader for Eddie Cantor's radio program on NBC. During the same year, he was a regular on the Hillman Hour program on KFWB in Los Angeles, California.

Sherwood married Dorothy Virginia Gumm, the sister of Judy Garland, and worked as a bandleader for Garland during sessions at Decca Records. He started a big band that included Dave Pell and Kitty Kallen and signed with Capitol Records. The band's first single, "The Elk's Parade", was a million seller. He dabbled in acting but led his big band through the 1940s.

In the mid-1940s, he hosted the radio program Bobby Sherwood Orchestra on the Mutual Broadcasting System. In 1953, he had a daily early morning program on WJZ in New York City. For the latter part of his career, he worked as a disc jockey.

In 1950, Sherwood was master of ceremonies on Variety Quiz (later titled Midnight Snack), a late-night variety program on WCBS-TV in New York City. He was a regular performer on The Red Buttons Show on TV in the 1950s. He hosted the DuMont Television Network variety show Stars on Parade (1953–54), was the announcer for DuMont's The Morey Amsterdam Show, and the host for the game show Quick as a Flash from March to May 1953. In the mid-1950s, he was host of Step This Way, a dance-oriented program broadcast on Saturday evenings on WABC-TV in New York City.

Sherwood died of cancer January 23, 1981, at his home in Auburn, Massachusetts. His sons Billy and Michael are both musicians, and his nephew is trumpeter Carl Saunders.

== Awards and honors ==
Sherwood has a star at 1825 Vine Street, in the Television section of the Hollywood Walk of Fame.

== Filmography ==
Year	Title	Role	Notes
1938	Garden of the Moon	Fidler's Announcer	Uncredited
1939	Naughty but Nice	Announcer	Uncredited
1939	Buried Alive	Holmes	Uncredited
1948	Campus Sleuth	Bobby Davis	(as Bobby Sherwood and His Orchestra)
1957	Pal Joey	Ned Galvin	(final film role)
