= Easy Come, Easy Go (unfinished film) =

- Directed by: Barry Shear
- Produced by: Bobby Roberts
- Starring: Jan and Dean; Terry-Thomas
- Production company: Dunhill Productions
- Distributed by: Paramount Pictures
- Country: United States
- Language: English

Easy Come, Easy Go was a proposed film starring Jan and Dean which was abandoned in 1965 due to a train crash.

Alan Rafkin was originally announced to direct. Eventually TV director Barry Shear was selected to make his feature debut. The plot involved a movie star (to be played by Terry-Thomas) who moved in with Jan and Dean and their friends to research a role.

Filming started August 2, 1965. On August 5, the unit was filming background shots involving a train which crashed into a flat car; Barry Shear and Jan Berry were injured, along with several other crew. The injuries to Jan and Shear were so severe that the movie was abandoned.

The cancellation led to Paramount reusing the film title the following year for an unrelated film starring Elvis Presley.
