= Walter Winchell =

American gossip reporter (1897–1972)

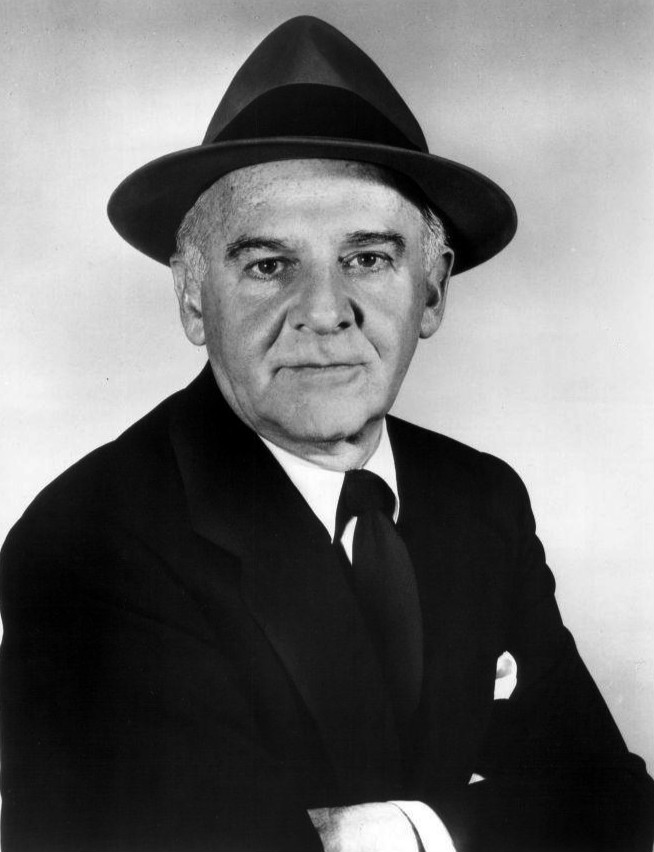
- Winchell in 1960
- Born: April 7, 1897; New York City, U.S.
- Died: February 20, 1972 (aged 74); Los Angeles, California, U.S.
- Resting place: Greenwood/Memory Lawn Mortuary & Cemetery
- Occupations: Journalist; broadcaster
- Spouse: Rita Greene (m. 1919; div. 1928)
- Partner: June Magee (1928–1970)
- Children: 3

Walter Winchell (April 7, 1897 – February 20, 1972) was an American syndicated newspaper gossip columnist and radio news commentator. Originally a vaudeville performer, Winchell began his newspaper career as a Broadway reporter, critic and columnist for New York tabloids. He rose to national celebrity in the 1930s with Hearst newspaper chain syndication and a popular radio program. He was known for an innovative style of gossipy staccato news briefs, jokes, and Jazz Age slang. Biographer Neal Gabler said that his popularity and influence "turned journalism into a form of entertainment".

He uncovered both hard news and embarrassing stories about famous people by exploiting his exceptionally wide circle of contacts, first in the entertainment world and the Prohibition era underworld, then in law enforcement and politics. He was known for trading gossip, sometimes in return for his silence. His outspoken style made him both feared and admired. Novels and movies were based on his wisecracking gossip columnist persona, as early as the play and film Blessed Event in 1932. As World War II approached in the 1930s, he attacked Nazi appeasers, then in the 1950s aligned with Senator Joseph McCarthy in his campaign against Communists, including McCarthy's quest to identify Communists in the entertainment industry. He damaged the reputation of Josephine Baker as well as others who had earned his enmity.

Over the years he appeared in more than two dozen films and television productions as an actor, sometimes playing himself.

== Early life ==
Winchell was born in New York City, the son of Jennie (Bakst) and Jacob Winchell, a cantor and salesman; they were Russian Jewish immigrants. He left school in the sixth grade and started performing in Gus Edwards's vaudeville troupe the Newsboys Sextet, which also featured Eddie Cantor and George Jessel. During this time, Winchell performed as a tap dancer. He served in the U.S. Navy during World War I, and attained the rank of lieutenant commander in the U.S. Navy Reserve.

== Professional career ==
Winchell began his career in journalism by posting notes about his acting troupe on backstage bulletin boards. He joined the Vaudeville News in 1920, then left the paper for the Evening Graphic in 1924, where his column was named Mainly About Mainstreeters. He was hired on June 10, 1929, by the New York Daily Mirror, where he became the author of the first syndicated gossip column, On-Broadway. The column was syndicated by King Features Syndicate.

He made his radio debut over WABC in New York, a CBS affiliate, on May 12, 1930. The show, Saks on Broadway, was a 15-minute feature that provided business news about Broadway. He switched to WJZ (later renamed WABC) and the NBC Blue (later ABC Radio) in 1932 for the Jergens Journal.

Walter Winchell's radio-acting career included an episode of Lux Radio Theatre, when on June 28, 1937 he played the role of newspaper reporter Hildy Johnson in a one-hour adaptation of The Front Page.

=== Underworld connections ===
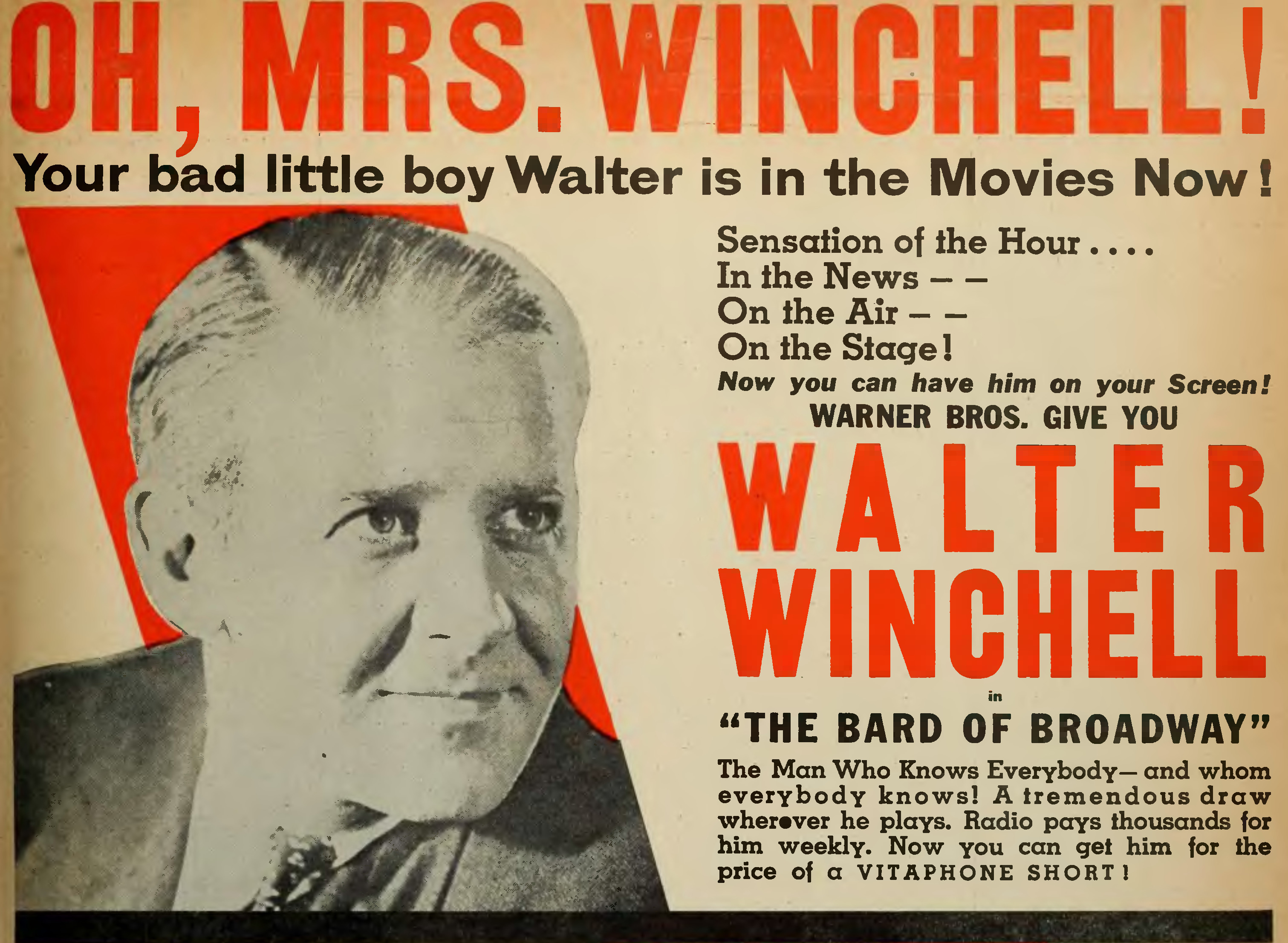
"The Bard of Broadway" with Walter Winchell ad in The Film Daily, 1932

By the 1930s, Winchell was "an intimate friend of Owney Madden, New York's no. 1 gang leader of the prohibition era." Madden gifted him a Stutz Bearcat and they had an agreement that Winchell would keep him out of his gossip column. They had met by chance in a barbershop when Winchell introduced himself to Madden. In 1932 his intimacy with criminals caused him to fear he would be murdered. He fled to California and reportedly "returned weeks later with a new enthusiasm for law, G-men, Uncle Sam, [and] Old Glory".

He had what his biographer described as a "cautious but cordial" relationship with Frank Costello, boss of the Luciano crime family. They both lived in The Majestic at 115 Central Park for roughly a dozen years together. When Costello testified before the US Senate's Kefauver Committee, Winchell argued that Costello's civil rights had been infringed upon. He later interviewed Costello for INS radio. Reception to the interview was overwhelmingly negative and it was one of the few times in his career where he wrote a series of columns defending himself. Costello frequently made large donations to Winchell's Damon Runyon Cancer Fund, which Winchell announced on the radio as coming from an anonymous generous benefactor. In 1939 Winchell served as an intermediary between FBI director J. Edgar Hoover and Costello in negotiations to secure the surrender of Louis Lepke.

His newspaper column was syndicated in a wide array of newspapers worldwide, and he was read by millions every day from the 1920s until the early 1960s. His Sunday night radio broadcast was heard by another 20 million people from 1930 to the late 1950s. In 1948, Winchell had the top-rated radio show when he surpassed Fred Allen and Jack Benny. One indicator of his popularity was being mentioned in Richard Rodgers and Lorenz Hart's 1937 song "The Lady Is a Tramp": "I follow Winchell and read every line."

=== Outspoken views ===
Winchell was one of the first commentators in America to attack Adolf Hitler and American pro-fascist and pro-Nazi organizations such as the German-American Bund, especially its leader Fritz Julius Kuhn. He was a staunch supporter of President Franklin D. Roosevelt and the New Deal throughout the Depression era, and frequently served as the Roosevelt Administration's mouthpiece in favor of interventionism as the European war crisis loomed in the late 1930s. Early on, he denounced American isolationists as appeasing Hitler, and explicitly attacked such prominent isolationists as Charles Lindbergh, whom he dubbed "The Lone Ostrich", and Gerald L.K. Smith, whom he denounced as "Gerald Lucifer KKKodfish Smith". Throughout the 1930s and 1940s, Winchell was also an outspoken supporter of civil rights for African Americans, and frequently attacked the Ku Klux Klan and other racist groups as supporting un-American, pro-German goals.

During World War II, he attacked the National Maritime Union, the labor organization for the civilian United States Merchant Marine, which he said was run by Communists, instancing West Coast labor leader Harry Bridges. In 1948 and 1949, he and influential columnist Drew Pearson attacked Secretary of Defense James Forrestal in columns and radio broadcasts.

Subsequently, Winchell began to denounce Communism as the main threat facing America.

=== Television ===
On October 5, 1952 a simulcast of Winchell's weekly radio broadcast was added to ABC's television schedule (see The Walter Winchell Show). Sponsored by Gruen Watch Company, it originated from WJZ-TV from 6:45 to 7 p.m. ET. He ended that association in 1955 because of a dispute with ABC executives. In 1956, he signed with NBC to host a variety program, also called The Walter Winchell Show, which was canceled after only 13 weeks—a particularly bitter failure in view of the success of his longtime rival Ed Sullivan in a similar format with The Ed Sullivan Show. He was then the host and narrator of The Walter Winchell File, a television crime drama series that initially aired on ABC from 1957 to 1958, dramatizing cases from the New York City Police Department that were covered in the New York Daily Mirror. ABC television rehired him in 1959 as the narrator of the 1930s-set crime drama series The Untouchables.. The Untouchables ran for four seasons. In 1960, an expanded half-hour revival of the 1952-1955 television version of Winchell's radio broadcast aired, but was canceled after six weeks.

In the early 1960s, a public dispute with Jack Paar effectively ended Winchell's career—already in decline due to a shift in power from print to television. Winchell had angered Paar several years earlier when he refused to retract an item alleging that Paar was having marital difficulties. Biographer Neal Gabler described the exchange on Paar's show in 1961:

Hostess Elsa Maxwell appeared on the program and began gibing at Walter, accusing him of hypocrisy for waving the flag while never having voted [which, incidentally, wasn't true; the show later issued a retraction]. Paar joined in. He said Walter's column was "written by a fly" and that his voice was so high because he wears "too-tight underwear" … [H]e also told the story of the mistaken item about his marriage, and cracked that Walter had a "hole in his soul".

On subsequent programs, Paar called Winchell a "silly old man" and cited other examples of his underhanded tactics. No one had previously criticized Winchell publicly, but by then his influence had eroded to the point that he could not effectively respond. The New York Daily Mirror, his flagship newspaper for 34 years, closed in 1963; his readership dropped steadily, and he faded from the public eye.

=== Personal ethics ===
Winchell became known for his attempts to destroy the careers of his political and personal enemies as his own career progressed, especially after World War II. Favorite tactics were allegations of having ties to Communist organizations and accusations of sexual impropriety. He was not above name-calling; for example, he called New York radio host Barry Gray "Borey Pink" and a "disk jerk". Winchell heard that Marlen Edwin Pew of the trade journal Editor & Publisher had criticized him as a bad influence and called him "Marlen Pee-you".

For most of his career, his contracts with newspaper and radio employers required them to hold him harmless from any damages resulting from lawsuits for slander or libel. He unapologetically published material told to him in confidence by friends; when confronted over such betrayals, he typically responded, "I know—I'm just a son of a bitch." By the mid-1950s, he was widely seen as arrogant, cruel, and ruthless.

While on an American tour in 1951, Josephine Baker, who never performed before segregated audiences, criticized the Stork Club's unwritten policy of discouraging black patrons, then scolded Winchell, an old ally, for not rising to her defense. Winchell responded swiftly with a series of harsh public rebukes, including accusations of Communist sympathies. He spurned any attempts by friends to mitigate the heated rhetoric. The ensuing publicity resulted in the termination of Baker's work visa, forcing her to cancel all her engagements and return to France. It was almost a decade before U.S. officials allowed her back into the country. The adverse publicity of this, and similar incidents, undercut his credibility and power.

In his radio and television broadcasts on April 4, 1954, Winchell helped stoke public fear of the polio vaccine. He said, "Good evening, Mr. and Mrs. America ... and all the ships at sea. Attention everyone. In a few moments I will report on a new polio vaccine claimed to be a polio cure. It may be a killer." Winchell claimed that the U.S. Public Health Services found live polio viruses in seven of ten vaccine batches it tested, reporting, "It killed several monkeys ... the United States Public Health Service will confirm this in about 10 days." Jonas Salk, developer of the polio vaccine, immediately responded that the vaccine, which had been recently tested on 7,500 schoolchildren at the University of Pittsburgh, had been triple tested for the absence of live virus by its manufacturers, the National Institutes of Health, and his own research lab, and that similar testing would continue to screen out batches containing live virus.

== Style ==
Many other columnists began to write gossip soon after Winchell's initial success, such as Ed Sullivan, who succeeded him at the New York Evening Graphic, and Louella Parsons in Los Angeles. He wrote in a style filled with slang and incomplete sentences. Winchell's casual writing style famously earned him the ire of mobster Dutch Schultz, who confronted him at New York's Cotton Club and publicly lambasted him for using the phrase "pushover" to describe Schultz's penchant for blonde women. Winchell's best known aphorisms include: "Nothing recedes like success" and "I usually get my stuff from people who promised somebody else that they would keep it a secret".

Herman Klurfeld, a ghostwriter for Winchell for almost three decades, began writing four newspaper columns per week for Winchell in 1936 and worked for him for 29 years. He also wrote many of the signature one-liners, called "lasties", that Winchell used at the end of his radio broadcasts. One of Klurfeld's quips was "She's been on more laps than a napkin". In 1952, the New York Post revealed that Klurfeld was Winchell's ghostwriter. Klurfeld later wrote a biography of Winchell, Winchell, His Life and Times, the basis for the television film Winchell (1998).

Winchell opened his radio broadcasts by pressing randomly on a telegraph key, a sound that created a sense of urgency and importance, and using the catchphrase "Good evening, Mr. and Mrs. America from border to border and coast to coast and all the ships at sea. Let's go to press." He then read each of his stories with a staccato delivery (up to a rate of 197 words per minute, though he claimed a speed of well over 200 words per minute in an interview in 1967), noticeably faster than the typical pace of American speech. His diction can also be heard in his breathless narration of the television series The Untouchables (1959–1963), as well as in several Hollywood films.

== Personal life ==
On August 11, 1919, Winchell married Rita Greene, one of his onstage partners. The couple separated a few years later, and he moved in with Elizabeth June Magee, who had already adopted daughter Gloria and given birth to her and Winchell's first child Walda in 1927. Winchell divorced Greene in 1928, but never married Magee, although they lived together for the rest of their lives.

Winchell and Magee had three children. Daughter Gloria died of pneumonia at age nine and Walda spent time in psychiatric hospitals. Walter Jr. died by suicide in the family garage on Christmas night of 1968. Having spent the previous two years on welfare, Walter Jr. had last been employed as a dishwasher in Santa Ana, California; for a time, he wrote a column in the Los Angeles Free Press, an underground newspaper published from 1964 to 1978.

== Later years ==
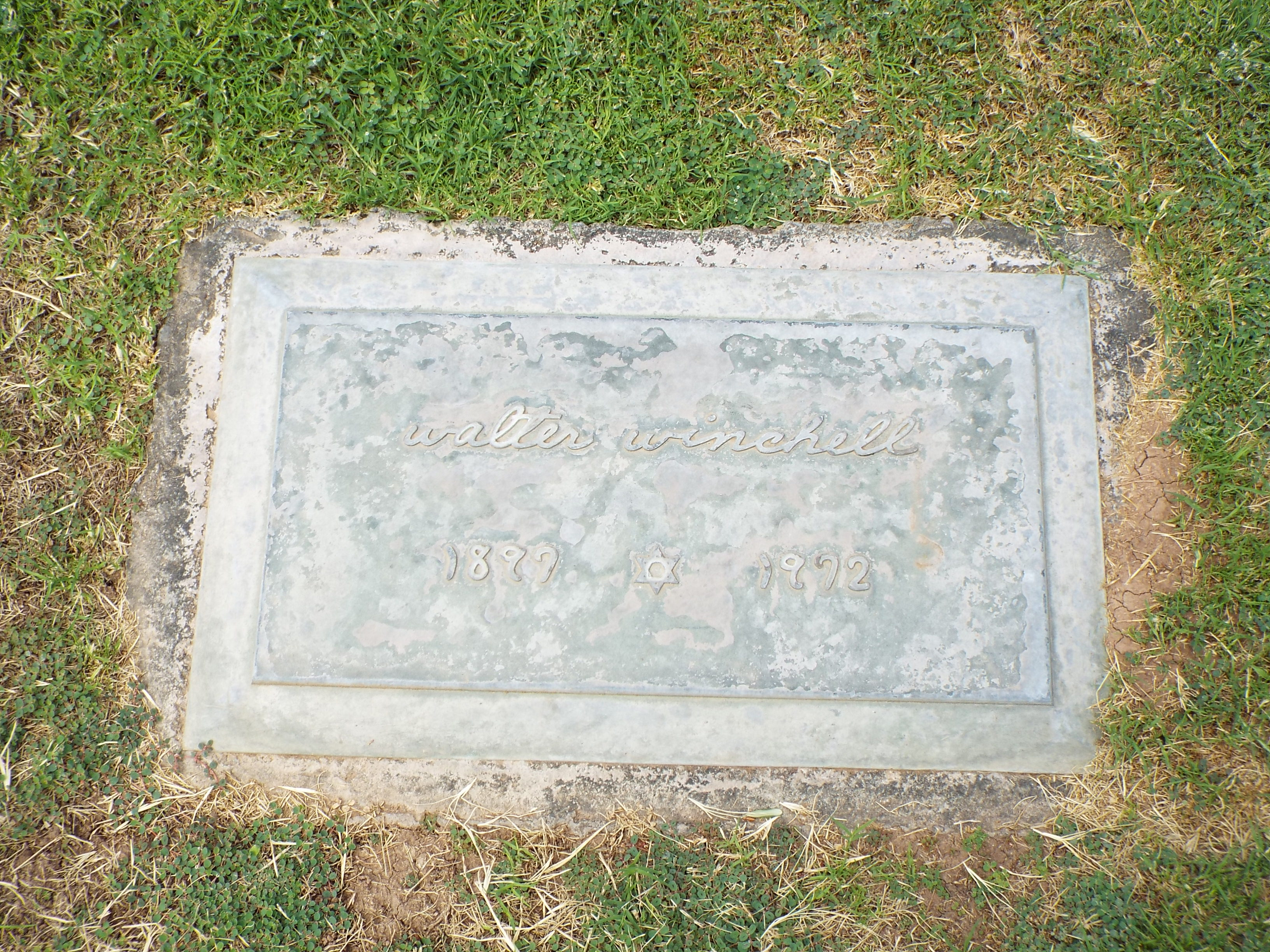
Grave site of Walter Winchell in Greenwood Memory Lawn

In the 1960s, Winchell wrote some columns for the film magazine Photoplay. He announced his retirement on February 5, 1969, citing his son's suicide as a major reason as well as the delicate health of his companion, June Magee. Exactly one year after his retirement, Magee died at a hospital in Phoenix, Arizona, while undergoing treatment for a heart condition.

Winchell spent his final two years as a recluse at the Ambassador Hotel in Los Angeles. He died at age 74 in Los Angeles and is buried at Greenwood/Memory Lawn Mortuary & Cemetery in Phoenix. Larry King, whose column replaced Winchell's in the Miami Herald, recalled:

He was so sad. You know what Winchell was doing at the end? Typing out mimeographed sheets with his column, handing them out on the corner. That's how sad he got. When he died, only one person came to his funeral: his daughter.

Several of Winchell's former co-workers expressed a willingness to go but were turned back by Walda.

=== Filmography ===
| Year | Title | Role | Notes |
|---|---|---|---|
| 1930 | The Bard on Broadway (Short) | Himself | Film debut |
| 1933 | I Know Everybody and Everybody's Racket (Short) | Himself | (Note: While the film's copyright was registered in 1933, the physical print has a 1932 date attached to it. The work will enter the public domain based on the 1932 date) |
| 1933 | Beauty on Broadway (Short) | Himself | |
| 1933 | Broadway Thru a Keyhole | Himself | Also writer |
| 1937 | Wake Up and Live | Himself | |
| 1937 | Love and Hisses | Himself | |
| 1947 | Daisy Kenyon | Himself | |
| 1949 | Sorrowful Jones | Himself | Voice, uncredited |
| 1955 | There's No Business Like Show Business | Himself | Voice, uncredited |
| 1956 | The Walter Winchell Show | Himself | 3 episodes |
| 1957 | A Face in the Crowd | Himself | |
| 1957 | Beau James | Narrator | |
| 1957 | The Helen Morgan Story | Himself | |
| 1957 | Telephone Time | Himself | 1 episode |
| 1957–1959 | The Walter Winchell File | Himself/host/'Two Gun' Crowley | |
| 1959 | Westinghouse Desilu Playhouse | Narrator | Voice, 3 episodes |
| 1959–1963 | The Untouchables | Narrator | Voice, 119 episodes |
| 1960 | The Bellboy | Narrator | Voice, uncredited |
| 1960 | College Confidential | Himself | |
| 1961 | Dondi | Himself | |
| 1962 | Wild Harvest | Narrator | Voice |
| 1964 | Valentine's Day | Radio Announcer | Voice, 1 episode |
| 1966 | The Lucy Show | Narrator | Voice |
| 1967 | The Kraft Music Hall | Himself | |
| 1968 | Single Room Furnished | Himself | Uncredited |
| 1968 | Wild in the Streets | Himself | Final film, uncredited |

== Legacy ==
Even during Winchell's lifetime, journalists were critical of his effect on the media. In 1940, St. Clair McKelway, who had earlier written a series of articles about him in The New Yorker, wrote in Time:

the effect of Winchellism on the standards of the press... When Winchell began gossiping in 1924 for the late scatological tabloid Evening Graphic, no U.S. paper hawked rumors about the marital relations of public figures until they turned up in divorce courts. For 16 years, gossip columns spread until even the staid New York Times whispered that it heard from friends of a son of the President that he was going to be divorced. In its first year, The Graphic would have considered this news not fit to print... Gossip-writing is at present like a spirochete in the body of journalism... Newspapers... have never been held in less esteem by their readers or exercised less influence on the political and ethical thought of the times.

Winchell responded, "Oh stop! You talk like a high-school student of journalism."

Despite the controversy surrounding Winchell, his popularity allowed him to leverage support for causes he valued. In 1946, after the death from cancer of his close friend and fellow writer Damon Runyon, Winchell appealed to his radio audience for contributions to fight the disease. The response led Winchell to establish the Damon Runyon Cancer Memorial Fund, since renamed the Damon Runyon Cancer Research Foundation. He led the charity with the support of celebrities, including Marlene Dietrich, Bob Hope, Milton Berle, Marilyn Monroe, and Joe DiMaggio, until his death from cancer in 1972.

In 1950, Ernest Lehman, a former publicity writer for Irving Hoffman of The Hollywood Reporter, wrote a story for Cosmopolitan titled "Tell Me About It Tomorrow". The piece is about a ruthless journalist, J.J. Hunsecker, and is generally thought to be a thinly veiled commentary on the power Winchell wielded at the height of his influence. It was made into the 1957 film Sweet Smell of Success, with a screenplay by Lehman and Clifford Odets.

Winchell is credited for coining the word "frienemy" in an article published by the Nevada State Journal on 19 May 1953.

== Winchellism and Winchellese ==
Winchell's colorful and widely imitated language inspired the term "Winchellism." An etymologist of his day said, "Winchell has achieved the position of dictator of contemporary slang." His use of slang, innuendo, and invented euphemisms also protected him from libel accusations.

Winchell invented phrases viewed as slightly racy at the time. Some of the expressions for falling in love Winchell used were "pashing it", "sizzle for", "that way", "go for each other", "garbo-ing it", "uh-huh"; and in a similar vein, "new Garbo, trouser-crease-eraser", and "pash". Some Winchellisms for marriage are "middle-aisle it", "altar it", "handcuffed", "Mendelssohn March", "Lohengrin it", and "merged".

== In popular culture ==
- Buddy Greco in 1960 recorded an updated version of the 1937 Rodgers and Hart song "The Lady is a Tramp" to include several 1950s cultural references. Among the lady's peculiar habits and attitudes listed in the lyrics, Greco adds "Why, she even reads Walter Winchell and understands every line. That’s why the lady is a tramp."
- The song "Let's Fly Away" from the 1930 Cole Porter musical The New Yorkers includes the lines "Let's fly away, and find a land that's so provincial, we'll never hear what Walter Winchell might be forced to say."
- Lee Tracy starred in the 1932 movie Blessed Event as a thinly disguised version of Winchell. The movie's title refers to Winchell's way of describing a pregnancy/birth on his radio broadcast.
- The song "Shuffle Off to Buffalo" from the 1933 musical film 42nd Street features the lyrics, "Some day, I hope we'll be elected / To buy a lot of baby clothes / We don't know when to expect it / But it's a cinch that Winchell knows."
- Winchell was a character in the 1992 movie Citizen Cohn.
- Groucho Marx did a Winchell parody in the 1932 Marx Brothers movie Horse Feathers. It included burlesques of Winchell's use of the phrase 'blessed event', his radio sign-off of "O.K., America!", and his use of a toy siren whistle on the program to punctuate items.
- Winchell starred as himself in the movie Wake Up and Live (1937) and its follow-up, Love and Hisses (1937).
- In the Warner Brothers cartoon Porky's Movie Mystery (1939), a radio announcer at the beginning of the short identifies himself as "Walter Windshield."
- Waldo Winchester, newspaper scribe, was a recurring figure in Damon Runyon's fiction.
- In the film Sweet Smell of Success, Burt Lancaster plays J. J. Hunsecker, a tyrannical gossip columnist widely understood by audiences at the time to be based on Winchell.
- In Robert Heinlein's 1961 novel Stranger in a Strange Land, characters refer to syndicated columnist Ben Caxton as a "winchell", the lower case indicating that in the future world of the novel, "winchell" had become a common noun.
- He was caricatured as a bird in the Warner Brothers cartoons The Coo-Coo Nut Grove and The Woods Are Full of Cuckoos in 1936 and 1937 respectively.
- Longtime San Francisco gossip columnist Herb Caen used Winchell as a model, calling the style 'three dot journalism'.
- Winchell is listed in the first verse (concerning the 1950s) of Billy Joel's 1989 song, "We Didn't Start the Fire", between South Pacific and Joe DiMaggio.
- Winchell was portrayed by Vaughn Meader in the 1975 crime biopic Lepke starring Tony Curtis.
- In 1991, Winchell was portrayed by Craig T. Nelson in the HBO biopic The Josephine Baker Story.
- The HBO biopic Winchell (1998) stars Stanley Tucci in the title role and Paul Giamatti as Herman Klurfeld, his sidekick and ghostwriter.
- In Douglas Kennedy's novel The Pursuit of Happiness (2001), Winchell appears in connection with McCarthyism.
- Winchell has a major role in Philip Roth's The Plot Against America (2004, adapted as miniseries 2020), an alternate history novel that depicts Charles Lindbergh winning the 1940 presidential election.
- In the 1991 film Oscar, Sylvester Stallone's character asks, "Why don't you phone it in to Walter Winchell?"
- In the 2001 musical The Producers and its 2005 film adaptation, Matthew Broderick's character mentions wanting to "read my name in Winchell's column."
- In the second season of television series Fargo, released in 2015, Betsy Solverson tells her husband "Good night, Mr Solverson" and Lou replies "Good night, Mrs. Solverson—and all the ships at sea," paraphrasing how Winchell introduced his radio broadcasts.
- In 2020, Walter Winchell: The Power Of Gossip, an episode of American Masters on PBS, profiled Winchell, touching on his career, connections, and controversy.
