= Kate Hopkins, Angel of Mercy =

American old-time radio soap opera

- Other names: Kate Hopkins
- Genre: Soap opera
- Running time: 15 minutes
- Country of origin: United States
- Language: English
- Syndicates: CBS
- Starring: Helen Lewis; Margaret MacDonald; Selena Royle
- Announcer: Nelson Case
- Written by: Gertrude Berg; Chester McCracken
- Original release: October 23, 1939 – April 3, 1942
- Sponsored by: Maxwell House coffee

Kate Hopkins, Angel of Mercy is an American old-time radio soap opera. After beginning as a transcribed program on seven stations on October 23, 1939, it was broadcast weekday afternoons on CBS from October 7, 1940, until April 3, 1942 and sponsored by Maxwell House coffee.

The show's initial premise was that after Kate Hopkins' husband died in a fire, she became a visiting nurse to support herself and her young son in the mythical American town of Forest Falls. Hopkins faced concerns such as "Once started, malicious gossip is hard to stop. Is it wise to face slander openly, or to solve it by running away?"

By July 1941, however, Hopkins had become "a widow of forty at a loose end when her son Tom is drafted into the Army." Hopkins was living on a plantation near New Orleans as companion to Jessie Atwood, "a retired and renowned lady of the theater". In that situation, Hopkins drew the attention of Atwood's son, who planned to marry 18-year-old Diane Pers. As time went on, Hopkins found herself attracted to Atwood's son, while Pers developed "much of a mutual interest" with Hopkins' son.

Production constraints during World War II resulted in the cancellation of the show. After the War Production Board ordered a reduction in use of tin containers, executives of Maxwell House's parent company, General Foods, ended the broadcasts.

== Personnel ==
Characters in the program and the actors and actresses who portrayed them are shown in the table below.

Character	Actor/Actress
Kate Hopkins	Helen Lewis; Margaret MacDonald; Selena Royle
Tom Hopkins	Ned Wever; Clayton "Bud" Collyer
Robert Atwood	Raymond Edward Johnson
Jessie Atwood	Constance Collier
Duke Duncan	Donald MacLaughlin
Smokie	Charles Calvert
Blackie	Joseph Julian
Diane Pers	Delma Byron
Elise	Peggy Allenby
Trudy	Templeton Fox

Nelson Case was the announcer. Writers for the program were Gertrude Berg and Chester McCracken.
