= Mariage =

Mariage may refer to:

- Mariage (card game), a European card game with bonuses for "marrying" king and queen of the same suit
- Mariage, a 1974 film by Claude Lelouch
- Mariage, a 2009 album by Kadril

== See also ==
- Marriage
- Marriage (disambiguation)
