= Stars on Parade (TV series) =

- Starring: Don Russell (host); Bobby Sherwood (host)
- Country of origin: United States

Production
- Running time: 30 minutes

Original release
- Network: DuMont
- Release: November 4, 1953 – June 30, 1954

Stars on Parade is a variety show on the now-defunct DuMont Television Network.

== Broadcast history ==
Stars on Parade was aired Wednesdays at 10pm EST from November 4, 1953, to June 30, 1954. The host for the first two episodes was Don Russell, who was the host of DuMont's series Guide Right and the announcer for DuMont's The Morey Amsterdam Show. The host for the rest of the series was musician and bandleader Bobby Sherwood (1914-1981).

== Episode status ==
One episode known to exist features singer Sarah Vaughan performing "My Funny Valentine" and "Linger Awhile". Two episodes are held in the J. Fred MacDonald collection at the Library of Congress.

== See also ==
- List of programs broadcast by the DuMont Television Network
- List of surviving DuMont Television Network broadcasts
- 1953-54 United States network television schedule

== Bibliography ==
- David Weinstein, The Forgotten Network: DuMont and the Birth of American Television (Philadelphia: Temple University Press, 2004) ISBN 1-59213-245-6
- Alex McNeil, Total Television, Fourth edition (New York: Penguin Books, 1980) ISBN 0-14-024916-8
- Tim Brooks and Earle Marsh, The Complete Directory to Prime Time Network TV Shows, Third edition (New York: Ballantine Books, 1964) ISBN 0-345-31864-1
