= Barry Shear =

American film director and producer (1923–1979)

- Born: March 23, 1923; New York City, U.S.
- Died: June 13, 1979 (aged 56); Los Angeles, California, U.S.
- Resting place: Hollywood Forever Cemetery
- Education: University of Wisconsin
- Occupations: Film and television director and producer
- Years active: 1950–1980

Barry Shear (March 23, 1923 in Brooklyn, New York – June 13, 1979 in Los Angeles) was an American film and television director and producer.

== Career ==
=== Military ===
He served in the United States Army Air Forces from October 1942 to March 1945.

=== Television career ===
Shear began directing for television in the 1950s for the DuMont Television Network news program Newsweek Views the News, and directed episodes of the DuMont series Guide Right, Not for Publication, and Joseph Schildkraut Presents. Shear directed The Hazel Scott Show for DuMont, the first television show to feature a Black woman as the star of a show, performing without sketch comedy or guests. He quickly moved to episodic television. Over his 30-year career in television he directed both series and telefilms. Series that he directed several episodes for include The Man from U.N.C.L.E., The Girl from U.N.C.L.E., The Name of the Game, Ironside, Alias Smith and Jones, Police Story, Police Woman, and The Feather and Father Gang.

=== Film career ===
Shear's first made-for-theaters feature was the 1968 counter culture film Wild in the Streets. He later directed theatrical films in various genres such as The Todd Killings in 1971 (based on the serial killer Charles Schmid), Across 110th Street in 1972, and the western The Deadly Trackers in 1973 (which he overtook from Samuel Fuller). While well received, these features met with only fair box office and Shear returned to work exclusively in television.

On August 5, 1965, both Shear and Jan Berry, of the singing duo Jan and Dean, were injured along with other film crew members while on the first day on the set of a new Paramount motion picture, Easy Come, Easy Go. Paramount would ultimately cancel the film and reuse the film title the following year for an unrelated film starring Elvis Presley.

== Personal life ==
Shear's wife was actress Sondra Shear, (1926–2002) and his daughter is director Wendy Shear.

== Death ==
Barry Shear died of cancer at Cedars-Sinai Medical Center in Los Angeles on June 13, 1979, at the age of 56.
