= Coke Time with Eddie Fisher =

American musical variety TV series

- Episode of the Classic 50's TV series "Coke Time"
- Genre: Music
- Written by: Gordon Auchincloss
- Directed by: Herbert Sussan
- Presented by: Lou Crosby
- Opening theme: "May I Sing to You"
- Country of origin: United States
- Original language: English
- No. of seasons: 3
- No. of episodes: 108

Original release
- Network: NBC
- Release: April 29, 1953 – February 22, 1957

Coke Time with Eddie Fisher is an American musical variety television series starring singer Eddie Fisher which was broadcast by NBC on Wednesday and Friday nights from 7:30 to 7:45 p.m. Eastern Time on Wednesdays and Fridays, from April 29, 1953, to February 22, 1957. It was not seen during the summer months. (A radio edition, recorded from previous TV soundtracks, was also heard on Tuesdays and Thursdays at 7:45 P.M. Eastern Time over the Mutual Broadcasting System from 1953 through 1955). The opening theme was "May I Sing to You".

== Overview ==
The program was initially hosted by Don Ameche with Freddy Robbins as the announcer, but in late October 1953 Ameche left the program and Robbins became its host. As could have been surmised from the title, the program was sponsored by Coca-Cola. The house band was Axel Stordahl and His Orchestra, and beginning in 1956 the singing group The Echoes appeared as a permanent backup group for Fisher and his frequent guest stars. The program was generally presented live, but was occasionally filmed in advance or shot on location. Coke Time with Eddie Fisher was last aired on February 22, 1957, although the series was by then sponsored by Standard Brands' Planters peanuts, as Coca-Cola previously cancelled their sponsorship during 1956 due to a dispute with bottlers over a proposed larger Coke bottle.

One of the primary purposes served by Coke Time was to round out the balance of the half-hour it shared with John Cameron Swayze's Camel News Caravan (The Huntley-Brinkley Report in 1956-'57), which was then, like all such regularly scheduled U.S. national newscasts, only 15 minutes in length. After the 1956-57 season, all such brief entertainment programs were discontinued, even though network news broadcasts remained 15 minutes in length until 1963, and afterwards there were no regularly scheduled prime time entertainment programs of this length remaining on U.S. network television, although there were daytime soap operas of this duration for many more years, and sports programs of roughly this length were often used as fillers to complete the time slots assigned to sports events of uncertain length, particularly boxing matches.

Guest singers on the program included Diahann Carroll, Florence Henderson, the Fontane Sisters and Sandy Stewart. Other guests included George Jessel and Milton Berle.

== Promotion ==
An April 1954 promotion offered people an opportunity to win a trip to New York City, visit with Fisher during a rehearsal, and be his guests for the program's broadcast. The contest also offered autographed special recordings by Fisher. In January 1957, Coca-Cola offered a 45 rpm extended play recording of six songs that Fisher had sung on Coke Time. The RCA Victor record was available for 25 cents by mail with a coupon found on Coca-Cola cartons.
