= Balance Your Budget =

- Genre: Game show
- Presented by: Bob McGready
- Country of origin: Australia
- Original language: English

Original release
- Network: TCN-9
- Release: 9 April 1959 – 16 June 1960

Balance Your Budget was an Australian television game show, which aired from around 9 April 1959 to 16 June 1960 on Sydney television station TCN-9. At the time, most Australian series aired in only a single city, which was likely also the case with Balance Your Budget. Described in TV listings as a "grocery quiz", it originally aired on 1:30PM on Thursdays, though it later moved to 1:00PM. It was hosted by Bob McGready. The archival status of the series is not known, though as game shows were seen as "disposable" by 1950s broadcasters, it is possible the series was wiped.
