= Cheer Television Theatre =

1954 American TV anthology series

Cheer Television Theatre (also known as TV Theatre) is an American anthology series and drama that aired on the NBC Television Network from May 30, 1954, through June 27, 1954.

The series aired on Sunday nights from 7–7:30 PM.

The series aired filmed dramas, most reruns from the Chevron Theatre, from the end of the primetime run of The Paul Winchell Show to the beginning of the 1954 version of College of Musical Knowledge. The series was produced by MCA Television. It was sponsored by the Procter & Gamble Corporation.

== Episodes ==
- Pablo's Well - May 30, 1954
- The Chinese Stick - June 6, 1954
- Pride of the Force - June 13, 1954
- Man on the Bluff - June 20, 1954
- The Boss Comes to Dinner - June 27, 1954
