= The Marriage (radio) =

American radio series (1953–1954)

The Marriage is an American comedy radio series which starred Hume Cronyn and Jessica Tandy. Based on their earlier Broadway play, The Fourposter, the series aired Sunday evenings on NBC at 7:30 p.m. Eastern Time from October 4, 1953 through March 28, 1954. The scripts were mostly written by Ernest Kinoy, and the closing theme was "A Star Is Born", by Robert Farnon.

== Characters and story ==
New York attorney Ben Marriott (Hume Cronyn) was married to former department store fashion buyer Liz (Jessica Tandy), who struggled with her switch to domestic life. The sophisticated couple discussed such subjects as art, theater, literature and philosophy, while raising a son, Pete (David Pfeffer), and an awkward teenage daughter, Emily (Denise Alexander). Bob Denton was the announcer.

== Production ==
Edward King was the director. Written by Ernest Kinoy, the series had an unusual gimmick of alternating viewpoints, as Ben narrated one week and Liz the next. The program was sustaining.

The series was produced after a 1952 audition recording left Bud Barry, vice president at NBC, pleased but thinking that a stronger script was needed.

== Critical response ==
A review of the premiere episode in the trade publication Billboard noted the similarity of the concept to that of The Fourposter and said, "The Cronyns, as usual, endow it with warmth and vitality."

== Television ==
The show was scheduled to move from radio to television, with Cronyn producing as well as acting in the show. However, Tandy suffered a miscarriage, and the show's debut was delayed a week. The TV series of the same name premiered in July 1954 to "warm and enthusiastic reviews." It ran through August, and abruptly ended after eight episodes.

A pilot was made in 1957 in an effort to revive the TV series.
