= The Igor Cassini Show =

- Genre: Talk show
- Starring: Igor Cassini
- Country of origin: United States
- Original language: English
- No. of seasons: 1
- No. of episodes: 19

Production
- Running time: 30 minutes

Original release
- Network: DuMont
- Release: October 25, 1953 – February 28, 1954

The Igor Cassini Show is a DuMont Television Network talk show that was hosted by columnist Igor Cassini. The show aired Sunday evenings from October 25, 1953, to February 28, 1954. It initially ran from 6 to 6:30 p.m. Eastern Time. In January 1954 it was moved to 6:15 to 6:30 p.m. E. T. Exclusively Yours was another name for the program.

== Background ==
A 15-minute local version of the show debuted on WNBT-TV on July 19, 1953. It featured film of Cassini's visiting Gloria Vanderbilt Stokowski at her Mid-Manhattan art studio and a display of still-photograph biography of Douglas Fairbanks Jr. Dumont picked up the program for network distribution, extended its length, and originated it from WTTG-TV in Washington.

== Overview ==
Episodes included interviews of guests, primarily "society and literary types", filimed at their homes and Cassini's reviews of then-current plays and films.

== Episode status ==
As with many DuMont series, no episodes are known to exist.

== Production ==
Geoffrey Jones was the producer, and Wes Harris was the director. Gene Hurley was the writer. The show's competition included Meet the Press on NBC.

== See also ==
- List of programs broadcast by the DuMont Television Network
- List of surviving DuMont Television Network broadcasts
- 1953-54 United States network television schedule

== Bibliography ==
- David Weinstein, The Forgotten Network: DuMont and the Birth of American Television (Philadelphia: Temple University Press, 2004) ISBN 1-59213-245-6
