= WTAC-TV =

Television station in Flint, Michigan (1953–1954)

- Flint, Michigan; United States
- Channels: Analog: 16 (UHF)

Programming
- Affiliations: ABC

Ownership
- Owner: Trendle-Campbell Broadcasting Company

History
- First air date: November 26, 1953
- Last air date: April 30, 1954
- Call sign meaning: Trendle and Campbell

Technical information
- ERP: 13,770 watts

WTAC-TV was a television station broadcasting on ultra high frequency (UHF) channel 16 in Flint, Michigan, United States. It was owned by the Trendle-Campbell Broadcasting Company alongside radio station WTAC (600 AM) and was affiliated with ABC. The station began broadcasting on November 26, 1953, as Flint's first television station and the second in the region, but it ceased operation five months later on April 30, 1954. Early economic difficulties with UHF television in the United States and competition from the very high frequency (VHF) stations in Detroit, whose signals reached Flint, largely precipitated its demise.

== Construction and sign-on ==
After the Federal Communications Commission (FCC) lifted its four-year freeze on television station construction grants in 1952, it left three commercial channels for use in Flint; very high frequency (VHF) channel 12 and ultra high frequency (UHF) channels 16 and 28. The first group to file for channel 16 was W.S. Butterfield Theatres, which had done so by early July. That month, a second group filed for the channel: the Trendle-Campbell Broadcasting Company, a partnership of George W. Trendle and H. Allen Campbell and owners of Flint radio station WTAC (600 AM). Butterfield amended its application to seek channel 12 instead of channel 16 in October; this left WTAC unopposed and led to the FCC giving Trendle-Campbell a construction permit for channel 16 on November 20, 1952.

Construction began on the station site at 2302 Lapeer in June; the transmitter would be located here as well as 12,000 square feet (1,100 m^{2}) of studio and office space. The Television Tips column run by local dealers in The Flint Journal noted that this was a new use for the land; the site had previously been a circus grounds. In August, WTAC-TV signed for affiliation with the ABC network. The possibility of affiliating its television station with ABC, then having just finished a merger with United Paramount Theatres, was cited as one reason why WTAC had exchanged network affiliations with WFDF, which consequently affiliated with NBC, in March 1953. However, WTAC-TV was one of multiple UHF stations whose ABC affiliations were essentially bonuses because they gave away air time to national advertisers for a limited time in hopes of building viewership.

The station began broadcasting test patterns on October 28, 1953. The start of a test pattern was enough to spark interest in television across Flint. A report in the Midland Daily News noted the response, "reminiscent of radio's early days", and noted that station officials were fielding reports from areas as far north as Tawas City and as far south as Detroit. However, the station had a surprise for viewers: on November 14, it broadcast its first program, the college football game between Michigan and Michigan State, followed the next day by an NFL game.

== Regular operation ==
WTAC-TV began airing its first regular scheduled programming on November 26, 1953—Thanksgiving Day. The opening day's schedule featured a mix of ABC network programming and local sports features. Several of the station's staff had once worked at WXYZ-TV in Detroit, including the station manager, program manager, film editor, and production manager.

When WTAC-TV began telecasting a test pattern, the studios and offices were unfinished on the inside, and network programs were received by rebroadcasting the Detroit stations, as received at the station, with their approval. This changed in the first two months of 1954. On January 1, 1954, the station began receiving network programming by way of a private microwave relay that allowed it to carry programming direct from the networks. Interior work was nearly completed on the studios by the end of February 1954, allowing for the expansion of local programming. The station also signed to carry the full television schedule of Detroit Tigers baseball games for the 1954 season.

== Closure ==
WTAC-TV announced that it would leave the air after its evening programming on April 30, 1954, for what it hoped would be a 60- to 90-day period. An announcement by vice president and general manager Campbell attributed the decision to the national environment for UHF stations, which it hoped would be improved by possible federal action such as the deintermixture of UHF and VHF channels. Though 62 percent of Flint TV households could tune UHF, Campbell described to Broadcasting a "blanket aversion" by advertisers to using UHF stations if any VHF outlet reached the area in the question. Even though Flint had no other stations, the primary competition for the station consisted of the three VHF network affiliates in Detroit and one in Lansing. The station also had been losing $10,000 a month, according to Campbell. It was the second closure of a UHF station in Michigan in a week, the other being WBKZ-TV in Battle Creek.

The financial situation of the WTAC stations caused creditors to agitate for their sale. In August 1954, WTAC radio was sold to Radio Hawaii, a division of the Tele-Trip Corporation and owner of station KPOA in Honolulu. That same month, Trendle-Campbell surrendered the WTAC-TV construction permit to the FCC.

After WTAC-TV folded, the television studios on Lapeer were also kept out of the sale of WTAC radio and leased to Detroit radio station WJR, which had just obtained the construction permit for channel 12 as WJRT. The ten-year lease included an option to purchase the property. However, WJRT was bogged down in legal issues over the location of its transmitter site, which would be near Chesaning. During this time, the 467-foot (142 m) tower on the site, the tallest structure in Flint, was damaged by a tornado during an outbreak on May 12, 1956. The WJRT matter was returned to the FCC that year, and the station was not approved to begin broadcasting until 1958. WJRT continues to operate from this site; the building was expanded in 2001 with a new wing.
