= Broadway to Hollywood =

- Also known as: Headline Clues
- Presented by: Don Russell (daytime); George Putnam (night, 1949–1951); Bill Slater (night, 1951–1953); Conrad Nagel (night, 1953–1954)
- Country of origin: United States

Production
- Running time: 30 Minutes

Original release
- Network: DuMont
- Release: July 4, 1949 – May 4, 1951
- Release: July 20, 1949 – July 15, 1954

Broadway to Hollywood is an American television program broadcast on the now-defunct DuMont Television Network. While the daytime version was mainly a talk show with news, celebrity gossip, and home-viewer quizzes, the quiz portion became a full-fledged nighttime version within two weeks of the program's debut.

== Broadcast history ==
The daytime show began on July 4, 1949, and was hosted by Don Russell. Two weeks later on July 20, a nighttime version hosted by George Putnam debuted. Both versions were originally called Headline Clues.

Putnam left in February 1951 and was replaced by Bill Slater until 1953, after which Conrad Nagel took the reins until the show's end on July 15, 1954.

Actors who appeared on Broadway to Hollywood: Headline Clues included Conrad Nagel. Edgar Higgins was a writer for the program.

Tidewater Associated Oil Company sponsored the program, promoting its Tydol and Veedol products.

== See also ==
- List of programs broadcast by the DuMont Television Network
- List of surviving DuMont Television Network broadcasts
- 1949-50 United States network television schedule (Thursdays, 8:30pm ET)
- 1950-51 United States network television schedule (Wednesdays, 10pm ET)
- 1951-52 United States network television schedule (Thursdays, 8:30pm ET)
- 1952-53 United States network television schedule (Thursdays, 8:30pm ET)
- 1953-54 United States network television schedule (Thursdays, 8:30pm ET)

== Bibliography ==
- David Weinstein, The Forgotten Network: DuMont and the Birth of American Television (Philadelphia: Temple University Press, 2004) ISBN 1-59213-245-6
