= Quick as a Flash =

- Logo from the pilot
- Created by: Richard Lewis; Ken Roberts
- Written by: Gene Wang
- Directed by: Richard Lewis
- Presented by: Ken Roberts (radio); Bobby Sherwood (March–May 1953); Bud Collyer (May 1953-1954)
- Starring: Elspeth Eric; Santos Ortega; Joan Alexander
- Narrated by: Frank Gallop; Win Elliott
- Country of origin: United States

Production
- Producers: Richard Lewis; Bernard J. Prockter
- Running time: 30 Minutes

Original release
- Network: Mutual Radio
- Release: July 16, 1944 – 1951
- Network: ABC
- Release: 1953 – February 25, 1954

Quick as a Flash is a 30-minute radio quiz program which featured drama segments with guest actors from radio detective shows.

Created by director Richard Lewis and emcee Ken Roberts, the program debuted over the Mutual Network on Sunday, July 16, 1944. Sponsored by the Helbros Watch Company, the show was produced by Lewis and Bernard J. Prockter with scripts by Gene Wang. Music was by Ray Bloch and the Helbros Orchestra.

Six contestants from the studio audience competed for cash and other prizes. Clues were presented in the form of dramatic sketches covering such subjects as current events, movies, books and historical situations. With a buzzer, a contestant could interrupt at any time to submit an answer.

During the Helbros Derby, a guest detective from a radio mystery program put in an appearance. Frank Gallop and Win Elliott were announcers.

The series ended on June 29, 1951. Approximately one year later, the series made an attempt to go on television.

== Television ==
The show's pilot was filmed in 1952 for NBC and hosted by Bill Cullen.

The series ran on ABC from March 12 to July 2, 1953 and again from September 10, 1953 to February 25, 1954. The series was hosted by Bobby Sherwood from March to May 1953, after which he was replaced by Bud Collyer.
