= Nine Thirty Curtain =

American TV dramatic anthology series (1953–1954)

- Genre: Anthology
- Country of origin: United States
- Original language: English
- No. of seasons: 1
- No. of episodes: 12

Production
- Running time: 30 minutes

Original release
- Network: DuMont
- Release: October 16, 1953 – January 1, 1954

Nine Thirty Curtain is a dramatic anthology television series which aired on the DuMont Television Network from October 13, 1953, to January 1, 1954. The 30-minute show aired on Fridays at 9:30 pm ET. It was broadcast locally in New York after it left the network.

== Overview ==
Filmed dramas shown on Nine Thirty Curtain starred "lesser-known actors and actresses".

== Episode status ==
As with most DuMont series, no episodes are known to survive.

== See also ==
- List of programs broadcast by the DuMont Television Network
- List of surviving DuMont Television Network broadcasts
- 1953-54 United States network television schedule

== Bibliography ==
- David Weinstein, The Forgotten Network: DuMont and the Birth of American Television (Philadelphia: Temple University Press, 2004) ISBN 1-59213-245-6
- Alex McNeil, Total Television, Fourth edition (New York: Penguin Books, 1980) ISBN 0-14-024916-8
