= Joseph Schildkraut Presents =

American TV anthology series (1953–1954)

- Genre: Anthology
- Written by: Tad Mosel
- Directed by: Barry Shear; David Lowe; Frank Telford
- Starring: Joseph Schildkraut (host and performer)
- Country of origin: United States
- Original language: English
- No. of episodes: 13

Production
- Producer: Ray Benson
- Running time: 30 minutes

Original release
- Network: DuMont
- Release: October 28, 1953 – January 21, 1954

Joseph Schildkraut Presents is an anthology television series starring stage and screen actor Joseph Schildkraut that aired on the DuMont Television Network from October 28, 1953, to January 21, 1954.

== Overview ==
Episodes were dramas. In addition to being the series's host, Schildkraut starred in some of the episodes.

== Broadcast history ==
The series originally aired Wednesdays from 8:30 to 9 p.m. Eastern Time. In January 1954 it was moved to Thursdays from 8 to 8:30 p.m. E. T. The original contract with DuMont called for 26 episodes, with Schildkraut hosting all 26, and acting in 14 episodes. The series was cancelled after 13 episodes had aired.

This series is often confused with Personal Appearance Theatre which aired on ABC in the 1951–52 season and on which Schildkraut was also featured. The UCLA Film and Television Archive has some episodes of this earlier series.

== Episode status ==
The UCLA Film and Television Archive lists seven episodes in its collection. However, only one (November 18, 1953) is from the DuMont series. The others are from the earlier ABC series Personal Appearance Theatre (1951–52), which also starred Schildkraut, and which may have also aired on DuMont stations.

== Production ==
Joseph Schildkraut Presents was on film. Ray Benson was the producer, and Barry Shear was the director.

== Critical response ==
The reference book The Complete Directory to Prime Time Network and Cable TV Shows said that Schildkraut "displayed a fairly wide range of talents" on the show, but scripts were inadequate, leading to cancellation of the series.

A review in The New York Times also found fault with the writing for the show. It described the November 11, 1953, episode as "very trite, confusing and maudlin". It said that the series had an expensive cast and was "handsomely mounted", but "the scripts are wretched". It concluded, "Mr. Schildkraut deserves better."

== See also ==
- List of programs broadcast by the DuMont Television Network
- List of surviving DuMont Television Network broadcasts
- 1953-54 United States network television schedule

== Bibliography ==
- David Weinstein, The Forgotten Network: DuMont and the Birth of American Television (Philadelphia: Temple University Press, 2004) ISBN 1-59213-245-6
- Alex McNeil, Total Television, Fourth edition (New York: Penguin Books, 1980) ISBN 0-14-024916-8
- Tim Brooks and Earle Marsh, The Complete Directory to Prime Time Network and Cable TV Shows, Ninth edition (New York: Ballantine Books, 2007) ISBN 978-0-345-49773-4
