= The Walter Winchell Show =

US television program

Columnist Walter Winchell and his The Walter Winchell Show was a mainstay on the early years of ABC television. Beginning on October 5, 1952 ABC added a televised simulcast of his existing 15-minute weekly time radio show. This continued until 1955 when he left ABC in a dispute with executives. The 1960 reboot of The Walter Winchell Show was the result of his agreement to return with a half hour, television-only broadcast.

In his five-year absence from ABC, the number of television programs linked directly to radio had dwindled greatly, as the still-newish medium had developed its own actors, and the remaining radio holdovers had learned how to play to the camera. Winchell would have none of this. Still wearing his felt "reporter" hat on the air, and punching out bogus "Morse Code" with his telegraph key to punctuate his stories, Winchell came across as a relic of another era. Even his trademark opening line, "Good evening Mr. and Mrs. North and South America and all the ships at sea ... let's go to press!" seemed obsolete by 1960. NBC's Jack Paar relentlessly mocked Winchell on his own show Tonight, a feud that effectively ended Winchell's career.

The 1960 revival of the show was a Nielsen ratings disaster and was cancelled after only six broadcasts. Winchell's only real association with ABC or television after this was his continued narration of The Untouchables until that program was cancelled three years later.

== Bibliography ==
- Tim Brooks and Earle Marsh, The Complete Directory to Prime Time Network and Cable TV Shows 1946–Present, Ninth edition (New York: Ballantine Books, 2007) ISBN 978-0-345-49773-4
