= Melody Street =

- Starring: Elliot Lawrence
- Country of origin: United States
- No. of seasons: 1
- No. of episodes: 20

Production
- Running time: 30 minutes

Original release
- Network: DuMont Television Network
- Release: September 25, 1953 – February 5, 1954

Melody Street is an American television series that aired on the DuMont Television Network. The program aired Fridays from September 23, 1953, to February 5, 1954. It initially was broadcast on Wednesdays from 8:30 to 9 p.m. Eastern Time. In November 1953 it was moved to Fridays from 8:30 to 9 p.m. E. T.

Initial host Allan Brown was succeeded by Elliot Lawrence. Guitarist Tony Mottola was the host for the show's final month. Regulars on the show were Lyn Gibbs, Joe Buwen, and Roberta McDonald.

== Criticism ==
Melody Street was hampered by a small budget, even by 1950s standards. Later-day critics, such as Castleman and Podrazik (1982), have cited Melody Street, among other DuMont series, as one of the reasons fewer and fewer viewers tuned in to the ailing DuMont Network. They stated Melody Street was, like several other DuMont programs during the 1953–1954 season, "doomed from the start by third-rate scripts and cheap production" and pointed out that the program "required the performers to lip-sync other people's records."

== Reception ==
John Lester for the Long Island Star-Journal said the program "presents an attractive melange of musical numbers" and that the program had "initiative, ingenuity and imagination".

== Episode status ==
Two complete episodes, January 1, 1954, and another 1954 episode, of the show survive at the UCLA Film and Television Archive, along with an excerpt from another episode.

== See also ==
- List of programs broadcast by the DuMont Television Network
- List of surviving DuMont Television Network broadcasts
- 1953-54 United States network television schedule

== Bibliography ==
- David Weinstein, The Forgotten Network: DuMont and the Birth of American Television (Philadelphia: Temple University Press, 2004) ISBN 1-59213-245-6
