= Marge and Jeff =

- Created by: Marge Greene
- Directed by: Leonard Valenta
- Presented by: Ernest Walling
- Starring: Marge Greene; Jess Cain
- Country of origin: United States
- No. of episodes: 260 (approx.)

Production
- Running time: 15 minutes

Original release
- Network: DuMont
- Release: September 21, 1953 – September 24, 1954

Marge and Jeff is an American sitcom broadcast Monday through Friday on the DuMont Television Network from September 21, 1953, to September 24, 1954.

== Broadcast history ==
The program originated as Marge and Fred on a station in Philadelphia. The title was changed when a new male co-star came on the show.

The show was broadcast every weekday at 7:15 pm Eastern Time, after Captain Video and His Video Rangers during its original run. The show starred and was written by Marge Greene. Each episode was 15 minutes long. Ernest Walling was the producer, and Leonard Valenta was the director.

The series, at one point, received a Neilson rating of 13.6. It ended on September 24, 1954, when Miles Laboratories took over the time slot, replacing the show with Morgan Beatty and the News.

== Format ==
The series focused on a newlywed couple in Manhattan. It was largely set in the living room and kitchen of characters Marge and Jeff, who were often accompanied by their dog Paisley. Costing just $5,000 a week to produce and aired on 40 stations, the series used a mix of rehearsed and ad-lib dialogue, based on a scenario written by Greene.

== Episode status ==
At least 27 episodes exist at the UCLA Film and Television Archive, and four at the Paley Center for Media. UCLA records show that the show probably never had a commercial sponsor and instead featured public service announcements.

Some of the existing episodes survived because it directly followed Captain Video which was regularly kinescoped, with Marge and Jeff apparently preserved on the same 30-minute reel of film.

UCLA records indicate that several episodes were repeated in July 1954. For example, the September 28, 1953, episode was repeated on July 20, 1954. This indicates that DuMont was retaining at least some of the episodes after broadcast. This is noteworthy because DuMont's archive was destroyed by a successor company after the network ceased broadcasting, and there has been speculation as to which shows DuMont had considered worth keeping.

== See also ==
- List of programs broadcast by the DuMont Television Network
- List of surviving DuMont Television Network broadcasts
- 1953-54 United States network television schedule
- Mack & Myer for Hire (another "daily" sitcom)
- The Trouble with Tracy (another "daily" sitcom)
- I Married Joan (similar 1950s sitcom)

== Bibliography ==
- David Weinstein, The Forgotten Network: DuMont and the Birth of American Television (Philadelphia: Temple University Press, 2004) ISBN 1-59213-245-6
- Tim Brooks and Earle Marsh, The Complete Directory to Prime Time Network TV Shows, Third edition (New York: Ballantine Books, 1964) ISBN 0-345-31864-1
