= Pulse of the City =

American TV dramatic anthology series (1953–1954)

- Country of origin: United States

Production
- Running time: 15 mins.

Original release
- Network: DuMont
- Release: September 15, 1953 – March 9, 1954

Pulse of the City is a 15-minute American television anthology drama series on the DuMont Television Network. The series ran from September 15, 1953, to March 9, 1954.

Stars of episodes included Rochelle Hudson.

== Production ==
Robert B. Tobias produced and directed the series. Other directors of the dramas included Robert Altman. Marvin Wald was the writer. Episodes were filmed on location in New York in 16mm color. Ehler's Coffee was the sponsor.

== Critical response ==
Patrick McGilligan, in the book Robert Altman: Jumping Off the Cliff, described Pulse of the City as "a kind of poor man's Dragnet" and said, "Some episodes were takeoff; others were sharply dramatic."

== Episodes ==
=== Partial list of episodes ===
- "Comeback" - September 22, 1953 - Cliff Cothron, Pat Rogers, John Scanlon, Fay Sappington
- "Time Exposure" - October 6, 1953 - Carlotta Sherwood, Edward Cary, Frank Sutton, Bob Herrman
- "The Case of Captain Denning"
- "The Case of Norman Doyle"
- "The Case of Bill Huff"

=== Status ===
Three episodes are in the collection of the UCLA Film and Television Archive.

== See also ==
- List of programs broadcast by the DuMont Television Network
- List of surviving DuMont Television Network broadcasts

== Bibliography ==
- David Weinstein, The Forgotten Network: DuMont and the Birth of American Television (Philadelphia: Temple University Press, 2004) ISBN 1-59213-245-6
- Tim Brooks and Earle Marsh, The Complete Directory to Prime Time Network TV Shows, Third edition (New York: Ballantine Books, 1964) ISBN 0-345-31864-1
