= Man Against Crime =

American TV detective series

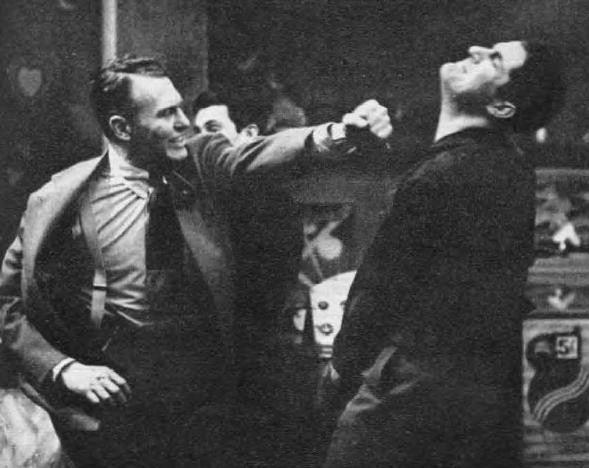
- Ralph Bellamy as Mike Barnett (1951)
- Also known as: Follow That Man
- Genre: Crime drama
- Created by: Lawrence Klee
- Written by: Vin Bogert
- Directed by: Paul Nickel (1949); Edward Montagne (1952-54); William Berke (1953); Frank McDonald (1953); Paul Alter (1953); Francis D. Lyon (1954)
- Starring: Ralph Bellamy (1949–54); Frank Lovejoy; Nita Talbot
- Narrated by: Carl King
- Theme music composer: Fred Steiner
- Country of origin: United States
- Original language: English
- No. of seasons: 5
- No. of episodes: 122

Production
- Producers: Edward Montagne; Lawrence M. Klee
- Editor: Maria Montague (1952-53)
- Running time: 30 mins. (approx)

Original release
- Network: CBS (1949–53); DuMont (1953–54); NBC (1953–54)
- Release: October 7, 1949 – June 27, 1954

Man Against Crime (also known as Follow That Man) starring Ralph Bellamy, is one of the first television programs about private eyes. It ran on CBS, the DuMont Television Network and NBC from October 7, 1949, to June 27, 1954, and was briefly revived, starring Frank Lovejoy, during 1956. The show was created by Lawrence Klee and was broadcast live until 1952. The series was one of the few television programs ever to have been simulcast on more than one network: the program aired on both NBC and DuMont during the 1953–54 television season.

== Synopsis ==
Man Against Crime stars Ralph Bellamy as Mike Barnett, a New York freelance private eye. In the 1951 season, Robert Preston co-starred as Mike Barnett's brother, Pat (who also assumed the lead while Bellamy was on vacation that summer). Mike Barnett did not carry a gun.

Accompanied by a frantic theme song by Fred Steiner [where is the evidence that Steiner wrote the theme? - the theme is named "Manhunt" and originally was in the Filmusic Library, then the Langlois Filmusic Library, then Cinemusic Library, and now in the APM Music Library - it can be found online at www.APMmusic.com and on YouTube], the film noir-style introduction features an unknown man running down a deserted New York City street while being chased by a black car, all of which is viewed from above. As he knocks on Barnett's door, there is a spray of sub-machine gun fire, and the man is killed. Barnett opens the door, hears the click of the bolt on the gun, ducks and is missed by a second, shorter burst of slugs. Barnett then takes off after the killer while Follow That Man appears in bold letters and the title of the episode is shown on a file folder that is propped up against a telephone. The filmed episodes were syndicated as Follow That Man because the sponsor owned the original title [see below].

The show's first prime-time episode aired on CBS on October 7, 1949, and the final prime-time episode was broadcast, on NBC, on August 26, 1956. In the 1950–51 season, the series finished at #13 in the Nielsen ratings, followed by a #29 finish in 1951–52.

== 1956 version ==
Man Against Crime returned to TV on NBC from July 1, 1956, through August 19, 1956, at 10 p.m. Eastern Time as a summer replacement for The Loretta Young Show. Procter & Gamble sponsored this version, which starred Frank Lovejoy and originated in Hollywood, California. It was televised live. Bill Spier was the producer, and George Cahan was the director.

A review of in the trade publication Variety described Lovejoy's acting as "mostly deadpan and businesslike, as perhaps befitting the infallible detective." It said, "Technical credits, including the sets, are good", but "The plots are almost incredible."

== Production ==
The program was initially broadcast live from CBS's studio in the Grand Central Terminal building, but by mid-1953, it was being filmed at the Bedford Park Studios in New York City, while exterior sites included the East River, Grant's Tomb, the Hudson River, the Staten Island Ferry, and subways. The budget was $10,000 - $15,000 per episode for the initial live broadcasts, but expenses increased with the shift to film.

Charles Russell was the producer, Paul Nickell was the director, and Lawrence Klee was the writer. The program originated from WCBS-TV. Philip Reisman Jr. was the script editor. Henry Sylvern provided the music.

== Sponsorship and scheduling ==
Camel cigarettes sponsored the series. That sponsorship produced limitations for writers that included "no disreputable person could smoke, nor could anyone smoke nervously or in any unattractive manner. No coughing (implying cigarettes could cause disease) or arson (suggesting cigarettes could cause fires) was allowed."

In October 1953, Man Against Crime moved to NBC, but that network was unable to clear time for the program in approximately 10 cities, including New York City. DuMont had no program scheduled for the show's Sunday night time slot, so it carried Man Against Crime in those cities. By then, WOR-TV in New York City was broadcasting reruns of earlier episodes of the show on Saturday nights.

== Episodes ==
=== Season 1 (1949–50) ===
No. overall	No. in season	Title	Original release date
1	1	"Episode #1.1"	October 7, 1949
2	2	"Episode #1.2"	October 14, 1949
3	3	"Episode #1.3"	October 21, 1949
4	4	"Episode #1.4"	October 28, 1949
5	5	"Episode #1.5"	November 4, 1949
6	6	"Episode #1.6"	November 11, 1949
7	7	"Episode #1.7"	November 18, 1949
8	8	"Episode #1.8"	November 25, 1949
9	9	"Episode #1.9"	December 2, 1949
10	10	"Episode #1.10"	December 9, 1949
11	11	"Episode #1.11"	December 16, 1949
12	12	"Episode #1.12"	December 23, 1949
13	13	"Episode #1.13"	December 30, 1949
14	14	"Episode #1.14"	January 6, 1950
15	15	"Episode #1.15"	January 13, 1950
16	16	"Episode #1.16"	January 20, 1950
17	17	"Episode #1.17"	January 27, 1950
18	18	"Episode #1.18"	February 3, 1950
19	19	"Episode #1.19"	February 10, 1950
20	20	"Episode #1.20"	February 17, 1950
21	21	"Episode #1.21"	February 24, 1950
22	22	"Episode #1.22"	March 3, 1950
23	23	"Episode #1.23"	March 10, 1950
24	24	"Episode #1.24"	March 17, 1950
25	25	"Episode #1.25"	March 24, 1950
26	26	"Episode #1.26"	March 31, 1950
27	27	"Episode #1.27"	April 7, 1950
28	28	"Episode #1.28"	April 14, 1950
29	29	"Episode #1.29"	April 21, 1950
30	30	"Episode #1.30"	April 28, 1950
31	31	"Episode #1.31"	May 5, 1950
32	32	"Episode #1.32"	May 12, 1950
33	33	"Episode #1.33"	May 19, 1950
34	34	"Episode #1.34"	May 26, 1950
35	35	"Episode #1.35"	June 2, 1950
36	36	"Episode #1.36"	June 9, 1950
37	37	"Episode #1.37"	June 16, 1950
38	38	"Episode #1.38"	June 23, 1950
39	39	"Episode #1.39"	June 30, 1950

=== Season 2 (1950) ===
No. overall	No. in season	Title	Original release date
40	1	"Episode #2.1"	September 8, 1950

=== Season 3 (1951) ===
No. overall	No. in season	Title	Original release date
41	1	"Episode #3.1"	August 10, 1951

=== Season 4 (1952–53) ===
No. overall	No. in season	Title	Directed by	Written by	Original release date
42	1	"Phobia"	Unknown	Unknown	October 1, 1952
43	2	"Murder in Rhyme"	Unknown	Unknown	October 8, 1952
44	3	"Baker Grandee"	Unknown	Unknown	October 15, 1952
45	4	"Joy Ride"	Edward J. Montagne	Checkley Ellis	October 22, 1952
46	5	"Carpathia"	Unknown	Unknown	October 29, 1952
47	6	"Paradise Lost"	Edward J. Montagne	Checkley Ellis	November 5, 1952
48	7	"The Victim Is Venus"	Edward J. Montagne	Vincent Bogert	November 12, 1952
49	8	"Get Out of Town"	Edward J. Montagne	Burton Benjamin	November 19, 1952
50	9	"Fuller's Folly"	Edward J. Montagne	Max Erlich	November 26, 1952
51	10	"Women's Reformatory"	Unknown	Unknown	December 3, 1952
52	11	"Killer Cat"	Edward J. Montagne	William L. Stuart	December 10, 1952
53	12	"Bartholdi"	Unknown	Unknown	December 17, 1952
54	13	"The Day They Kidnapped Santa Claus"	Unknown	Unknown	December 24, 1952
55	14	"Dragon's Blood"	Unknown	Unknown	December 31, 1952
56	15	"Breaking Point"	Unknown	Unknown	January 7, 1953
57	16	"Ferry Boat"	Paul Alter	Vincent Bogert	January 14, 1953
58	17	"Murder in the Studio"	Unknown	Unknown	January 21, 1953
59	18	"The Silken Touch"	Edward J. Montagne	Stanley Niss	January 28, 1953
60	19	"Third Rail"	Edward J. Montagne	Bill Demling	February 4, 1953
61	20	"Exclusive"	Unknown	Unknown	February 11, 1953
62	21	"The Midnight Express"	Unknown	Unknown	February 18, 1953
63	22	"A Bottle of Death"	Unknown	Unknown	February 25, 1953
64	23	"The Iceman"	Edward J. Montagne	Stanley Niss	March 4, 1953
65	24	"Death Takes a Partner"	Edward J. Montagne	Don Sanford	March 11, 1953
66	25	"Sic Transit Gloria"	Edward J. Montagne	Vincent Bogert	March 18, 1953
67	26	"Family Affair"	Edward J. Montagne	Checkley Ellis	March 25, 1953
68	27	"The Hitch Heisters"	Frank McDonald	Stanley Niss	April 1, 1953
69	28	"Free Ride"	Frank McDonald	Art Stark & Irving Elman	April 8, 1953
70	29	"Death Below Decks"	Unknown	Unknown	April 15, 1953
71	30	"High Ambush"	Paul Alter	William L. Stuart	April 22, 1953
72	31	"The Cocoanut's Eye"	William Berke	William L. Stuart	May 6, 1953
73	32	"Room 505"	Frank McDonald	Vincent Bogert	May 13, 1953
74	33	"The Day Man"	William Berke	Paul Alter	May 20, 1953
75	34	"Hot Fur"	Frank McDonald	Paul Alter	May 27, 1953
76	35	"The Doll Bandit"	William Berke	Vincent Bogert	June 10, 1953
77	36	"Washington Story"	William Berke	Burton Benjamin & Robert Shaplen	June 17, 1953
78	37	"Black Leg – White Tie"	Frank McDonald	Stanley Niss	June 24, 1953
79	38	"Fraternity of Five"	William Berke	Story by : Don Sanford; Teleplay by : Hamish McLeod	July 1, 1953
80	39	"Death on the Diamond"	Unknown	Unknown	July 17, 1953
81	40	"The Polecat Shakedown"	Edward J. Montagne	J.P. Miller	July 24, 1953
82	41	"Hide and Seek"	William Berke	Vincent Bogert	August 7, 1953
83	42	"The Wire Tappers"	William Berke	Checkley Ellis	August 14, 1953
84	43	"The Missing Cadet"	Edward J. Montagne	B. Loring	August 28, 1953

=== Season 5 (1953–54) ===
No. overall	No. in season	Title	Original release date
85	1	"Death Wears Lead Shoes: Part 1"	October 11, 1953
86	2	"Death Wears Lead Shoes: Part 2"	October 18, 1953
87	3	"Three Cents Worth of Murder"	October 25, 1953
88	4	"Time Keepers"	November 1, 1953
89	5	"Murder in the Rough"	November 8, 1953
90	6	"Main Bout Is Murder"	November 15, 1953
91	7	"Thirty Dimes"	November 22, 1953
92	8	"Cube Root of Murder"	November 29, 1953
93	9	"Murder Mountain"	December 6, 1953
94	10	"A Very Dead Ringer"	December 13, 1953
95	11	"Petite Larceny"	December 20, 1953
96	12	"Going, Going Gone"	December 27, 1953
97	13	"Don't Feed the Animals"	January 3, 1954
98	14	"Danger for Duffy"	January 10, 1954
99	15	"Terror 12 Stories High"	January 17, 1954
100	16	"Holler Uncle"	January 24, 1954
101	17	"Beauty and the Beasts"	January 31, 1954
102	18	"Little Boy Blues"	February 7, 1954
103	19	"Target with Two Ts"	February 14, 1954
104	20	"Mike's Missing Marbles"	February 21, 1954
105	21	"U.F.O."	February 28, 1954
106	22	"Will o' the Wisp"	March 7, 1954
107	23	"Rigged for Murder"	March 14, 1954
108	24	"Hit and Run"	March 21, 1954
109	25	"Canary Yellow"	March 28, 1954
110	26	"The Plugged Shilling"	April 4, 1954
111	27	"The Chinese Dolls"	April 11, 1954
112	28	"Barometer Falling"	April 18, 1954
113	29	"The Man from Dannemora"	April 25, 1954
114	30	"The Man in the Iron Car"	May 2, 1954
115	31	"The Sunset Farm"	May 9, 1954
116	32	"Where's Mimi?"	May 16, 1954
117	33	"Hot as Three Pistols"	May 23, 1954
118	34	"Concrete Jungle"	May 30, 1954
119	35	"The Young Hoods"	June 6, 1954
120	36	"Next to Closing"	June 13, 1954
121	37	"No Place to Hide"	June 20, 1954
122	38	"Connecticut State Police"	June 27, 1954

== See also ==
- List of programs broadcast by the DuMont Television Network
- List of surviving DuMont Television Network broadcasts

== Bibliography ==
- David Weinstein, The Forgotten Network: DuMont and the Birth of American Television (Philadelphia: Temple University Press, 2004) ISBN 1-59213-245-6
- Alex McNeil, Total Television, Fourth edition (New York: Penguin Books, 1980) ISBN 0-14-024916-8
- Tim Brooks and Earle Marsh, The Complete Directory to Prime Time Network TV Shows, Third edition (New York: Ballantine Books, 1964) ISBN 0-345-31864-1
