= The Best in Mystery =

American television series

The Best in Mystery is an American anthology and mystery television series that ran for three years in the 1950s as a summer replacement series for the crime drama The Big Story.

The series premiered on NBC on July 16, 1954, and aired on Friday nights from 9 to 9:30 p.m. until September 1954. The next summer it aired from July 1955 to September 1955, and the following summer from July 13, 1956, to August 31, 1956. The 1955 broadcasts featured MCA-TV productions, most of which had been broadcast on The Pepsi-Cola Playhouse or Studio 57. Episodes aired in 1956 featured Dick Powell as Willie Dante, owner of the San Francisco night club Dante's Inferno. They were first broadcast as part of Four Star Playhouse on CBS.

The program was sponsored on alternate weeks by Simoniz and American Tobacco Company, with American Tobacco and the Toni Company alternating in 1956.

== Guest stars ==
- Agnes Moorehead
- Tom Drake
- Elizabeth Patterson
- Harry Harvey, Jr.
- Ross Elliott
- Mary Field
- Lloyd Corrigan
- Jay Novello
- George Nader
- Carolyn Jones
- Fay Roope
- Lynne Roberts
- Morris Ankrum
- Kim Spalding
- Marilyn Erskine

== Episodes ==
- Lullabye - July 16, 1954
- Lost Kid - July 23, 1954
- Death Makes a Pass - July 30, 1954
- Account Closed - August 6, 1954
- The Watchers and the Watched - August 13, 1954
- Frozen Escape - August 20, 1954
- Death Has No System - August 27, 1954
- Victim Ann Norville - September 3, 1954
