= On Your Way =

American TV game show (1953–1954)

- Genre: Game show
- Presented by: Bud Collyer (DuMont); John Reed King (ABC) with Kathy Godfrey (ABC)
- Narrated by: Don Morrow
- Country of origin: United States
- Original language: English

Production
- Running time: 27 minutes

Original release
- Network: DuMont (1953-1954); ABC (1954)
- Release: September 9, 1953 – April 17, 1954

On Your Way is an American game show that aired on the DuMont Television Network from September 9, 1953, to January 20, 1954, before moving to ABC from January 23 to April 17, 1954.

The series originated from New York City, and was sponsored by Welch's Family Wine.

== Gameplay ==
In this quiz show the contestants, which consisted of pairs, had the chance to win a trip to any part of the United States. The more questions they won, the further they would get to travel on bus. For example, in one episode a contestant and her partner/friend stated that they would like to travel to Austin, Texas, so that they could improve their education. Occasionally, the full prize would be given to the contestants even if they didn't win, if it was decided that they had a sad enough story.

At the end of each episode, the winning couples would get a chance to fly to their destination on an airplane, then a luxury to most people.

=== Format change ===
After the series moved to ABC, the network only used the game show format on January 23 and 30; on February 6, the program was changed to a talent contest.

== Episode status ==
One of the last three DuMont episodes is known to exist from January 1954, with special guest Jackie Cooper; although the gameplay is intact, all copies found have no last segment.

== See also ==
- Down You Go (another popular DuMont game show)
- List of programs broadcast by the DuMont Television Network
- List of surviving DuMont Television Network broadcasts
- Wiping

== Bibliography ==
- David Weinstein, The Forgotten Network: DuMont and the Birth of American Television (Philadelphia: Temple University Press, 2004) ISBN 1-59213-245-6
- Tim Brooks and Earle Marsh, The Complete Directory to Prime Time Network TV Shows, Third edition (New York: Ballantine Books, 1964) ISBN 0-345-31864-1
