= The Marriage (American TV series) =

American Sitcom

- Genre: Sitcom
- Written by: Ernest Kinoy
- Directed by: Jack Garfein
- Starring: Hume Cronyn; Jessica Tandy
- Country of origin: United States
- Original language: English
- No. of seasons: 1
- No. of episodes: 8

Production
- Producer: Hume Cronyn
- Camera setup: Multi-camera
- Running time: 24 mins.

Original release
- Network: NBC
- Release: July 8 – August 19, 1954

The Marriage is an American sitcom that aired on NBC from July to August 1954. The series is noted as the first prime time network color television series.

== Synopsis ==
Broadcast live by NBC for seven episodes in the summer of 1954, the series stars real-life couple Hume Cronyn (who also produced the show) and Jessica Tandy as a New York lawyer and his wife with two children, played by Susan Strasberg and Malcolm Brodrick.

== Production ==
Replacing The Dave Garroway Show, the half-hour show, written by Ernest Kinoy, debuted on July 8, 1954, originating from the Colonial Theatre in New York City, NBC's color television production facility.

The television series was adapted from an NBC radio series of the same title, also starring Cronyn and Tandy and written by Kinoy, that ran from October 1953 to February 1954. The television show was directed by Jack Garfein and Marc Daniels. It was originally scheduled for 10 - 10:30 p.m. Eastern Time, beginning on July 1, 1954, running until August 26.

== Reception ==
The New York Times television critic called the show "new and different and delightful," and wrote, "'The Marriage' is a sparkling, crisp portrayal of some charming people." The Washington Post called it among the best of the summertime replacement series, praising its "adult approach to situation comedy," with believable situations and intelligent characters. A review in the trade publication Billboard said that the TV program was "a real entertainment job" that was as good as the radio version. It said that the program "has the charm of complete naturalness."

The show was suspended after August 19, when Cronyn and Tandy left to tour on stage. There was talk in late 1954 of resuming the series, but it did not happen.

== 1957 pilot ==
An attempt to revive the series in 1957 resulted in a filmed pilot episode. The cast was the same as in the 1954 series except that Natalie Trundy replaced Strasberg as Emily.
