= Of Many Things =

- Genre: Panel discussion
- Starring: Bergen Evans
- Country of origin: United States
- Original language: English
- No. of seasons: 1/2

Production
- Running time: 30 mins.

Original release
- Network: ABC
- Release: October 5, 1953 – January 11, 1954

Of Many Things is a half-hour panel discussion television series that aired on ABC from October 5, 1953, to January 11, 1954. It was hosted by Dr. Bergen Evans. The title was also used for an Evans radio program and recordings of selected episodes of that show.

== Format ==
Using a set resembling Evans's study, episodes began with him meeting with someone who had a particular interest in the episode's topic. Then someone else came in and posed questions that might have been expected from viewers.

Topics discussed on the program included:

- the art of practical joking (with H. Allen Smith
- the capture of a German submarine during World War II
- popular music in America (with Mitch Miller)
- economic recovery of Pittsburgh, Pennsylvania
- growth of cancer and how it can be controlled
- "The Emancipation of Women Since 1900" (with Frances Perkins)
- "The World's New Continent — Africa" (with Melville J. Herskovits)
- "Art in Everyday Living"
- "Old Cars"
- "The Atomic Submarine" (with Walter Zinn)

== Production ==
Of Many Things originated from WBKB-TV in Chicago. Louis G. Cowan, Incorporated was the packager, with John Lewellen and Jay Sheridan as producers. It was broadcast on Mondays from 8:30 to 9 p.m. Eastern Time. The program had no advertisers, and Evans once described its budget as "one frayed thread out of a shoestring." The staff dealt with a backlog of mail from viewers such that workers were two months behind in handling letters when the show ended.

== Critical response ==
Bill Ladd wrote about the program in the (Louisville, Kentucky) Courier Journal the week after it ended: "I thought Evans did a mighty enjoyable show. The format showed some imagination."

== Radio and recordings ==
Of Many Things was the title of a 15-minute weekly program that Evans had on WNYC radio in New York City. Beginning on November 27, 1955, he presented essays on topics that included "Art of Being Nasty", "Byron and Hemingway", "The New Suburbia", "On Being Funny", "Phrase Origins", and "Some Aspects of Shakespeare". Recordings of 16 of those essays were released on four LP records in 1957 (The Spoken Word, SW-A2). A review in the periodical EdScreen & AV Guide called the recordings "a rare find which will delight instructors in English and in speech in secondary schools and in colleges."
