= The George Jessel Show =

American TV variety series (1953–1954)

- Written by: George Jessel; Sam Carlton
- Directed by: Edward Nugent
- Starring: George Jessel
- Narrated by: Ed Michaels
- Opening theme: "Roses in December"
- No. of seasons: 1
- No. of episodes: 32

Original release
- Network: ABC
- Release: September 13, 1953 – April 11, 1954

The George Jessel Show is a 30-minute television variety program that was broadcast live from New York. It aired on ABC from September 13, 1953, to April 11, 1954.

== Overview ==
After having worked as one of several rotating hosts of Four Star Revue on NBC television during the 1952–1953 U.S. television season, comedian George Jessel gained his own program in 1954. The show used a celebrity roast format, with Jessel drawing on his self-proclaimed "Toastmaster General of the United States" status to give provide a humorous treatment of each week's guest. Guests of honor included Margaret O'Brien, Sophie Tucker and Mitzi Gaynor.

The show's sponsors included Ekco Products Company, B.B. Pen Company, and Gemex Watch Band Company.

== Cast and crew ==
The program also featured Hal Sawyer. Manny Manheim was the producer. Jessel and Sam Carlton were the writers.

== Production ==
Although the program was purported to be live and extemporaneous, it was actually scripted and rehearsed. Writers provided material to supplement Jessel's remarks.

=== Legal issue ===
In January 1955, the B.B. Pen Company, Inc. sued ABC-Paramount Theaters, Inc., charging breach of contract and fraud with regard to the company's sponsorship of the Jessel program. The suit alleged that some local stations pre-empted the program, diminishing the reach of the pen company's advertising. The $1.5 million suit was filed in Los Angeles Federal Court.

== Reception ==
A review in the November 30, 1953, issue of the trade publication Broadcasting panned The George Jessel Show, calling it "As sad a variety program as has passed before the discerning eye of a tv [sic] camera ..." The reviewer held Jessel himself responsible for "this shabby excuse for entertainment." After complimenting the quality of guest performers and production personnel, the reviewer noted "half-hearted applause at the end of the Jessel show" as an indication of the audience's feelings.
