= Summer Playhouse (1954 TV series) =

- Presented by: Nelson Case (1954); Jane Wyman (1957)
- Country of origin: United States
- Original language: English
- No. of seasons: 2

Production
- Running time: 30 minutes

Original release
- Network: NBC
- Release: July 6, 1954 – September 17, 1957

Summer Playhouse is a 30-minute NBC summer anthology television series broadcast in the summers of 1954 and 1957. It consisted of reruns of episodes previously aired on other anthology series.

Summer Playhouse is unrelated to a CBS series of the same name that aired during the summers of 1964 and 1965.

== Broadcast history ==
Summer Playhouse premiered on July 6, 1954, and ran until August 24, 1954, airing on Tuesdays from 9:00 to 9:30 p.m. Eastern Time. It returned three summers later in July 1957, premiering on July 2 and airing on Tuesdays from 9:30 to 10:00 p.m. Eastern Time. Its final episode was broadcast on September 17, 1957.

The premiere episode in 1954 was "The Seven Graces".

== Cast ==
Nelson Case was the host in 1954. Jane Wyman hosted in 1957.
