= Guide Right =

- Directed by: Barry Shear
- Presented by: Donn Russell (host); The Airmen of Note
- Country of origin: United States

Production
- Running time: 24 mins.

Original release
- Network: DuMont
- Release: February 25, 1952 – February 5, 1954

Guide Right is an American musical variety show which aired on the DuMont Television Network from February 25, 1952, to February 5, 1954.

The program was produced by the First Army Recruiting Service and supplied by the United States Air Force as a means of increasing enlistment for the Korean War. It featured military performance groups such as The Airmen of Note (founded by Fred Kepner), and The Singing Sergeants. Each 30-minute episode was hosted by Donn Russell, with Elliot Lawrence conducting the orchestra.

The show featured civilian musical artists in addition to military personnel. Guest performers included Eddie Fisher, June Valli, Sunny Gale, Teresa Brewer and Steve Lawrence.

== Episode status ==
The UCLA Film and Television Archive has 18 episodes in its collection, and the Paley Center for Media has two episodes.

== See also ==
- List of programs broadcast by the DuMont Television Network
- List of surviving DuMont Television Network broadcasts

== Bibliography ==
- David Weinstein, The Forgotten Network: DuMont and the Birth of American Television (Philadelphia: Temple University Press, 2004) ISBN 1-59213-245-6
- Alex McNeil, Total Television, Fourth edition (New York: Penguin Books, 1980) ISBN 0-14-024916-8
- Tim Brooks and Earle Marsh, The Complete Directory to Prime Time Network and Cable TV Shows 1946–Present, Ninth edition (New York: Ballantine Books, 2007) ISBN 978-0-345-49773-4
