= 1955 in American television =

This is a list of American television-related events in 1955.

== Events ==
Date	Event	Ref
March 5	Elvis Presley makes his first television performance on Louisiana Hayride, a program shown locally on KSLA in Shreveport, Louisiana.	
March 15	Andy Griffith stars in his television debut in the play No Time for Sergeants, broadcast by the American Broadcasting Company in The United States Steel Hour series.	
April 1	The DuMont Television Network drastically decreases its programming; just eight series to keep the network operating, in anticipation of its eventual shutdown sixteen months later.	
May 9	Harpo Marx makes a memorable appearance on I Love Lucy.	
May 9	Jim Henson's puppet show Sam and Friends first airs on NBC O&O station WRC-TV in Washington, D.C.	
June 7	The quiz show craze begins with the premiere of The 64,000 Dollar Question. The series spawns many imitations, including Twenty-One the next year.	
September 28	World Series baseball is broadcast in color for the first time in the U.S., with WITN-TV in Washington, North Carolina signing on the air with the first game of the 1955 World Series as their first telecast.	

== Networks and services ==
=== Launches ===
Network	Type	Launch date	Notes	Source
CatholicTV	Cable television	January 1		

== Television programs ==
=== Debuts ===
Date	Debut	Network
January 2	The Bob Cummings Show (also known as Love That Bob)	NBC
January 3	Hollywood Today	NBC
January 5	Norby	NBC
January 17	TV Reader's Digest	ABC
January 19	The Millionaire	CBS
January 22	Ozark Jubilee	ABC
February 3	Star Tonight	ABC
February 27	Key to the Ages	ABC
April	Paul Dixon Show	WLWT
April 9	Science Fiction Theatre	Syndication
May 3	Have a Heart	Dumont
May 9	Sam and Friends	WRC-TV
June 3	It's Alec Templeton Time	Dumont
June 25	The Soldiers	NBC
June 28	Talent Varieties	ABC
July 2	The Lawrence Welk Show	ABC
July 20	Frankie Laine Time	CBS
September 6	The Life and Legend of Wyatt Earp	ABC
September 10	Gunsmoke	CBS
September 10	It's Always Jan	CBS
September 12	Medical Horizons	ABC
September 13	Kings Row	ABC
September 14	Hollywood Preview	DuMont
September 14	MGM Parade	ABC
September 20	Cheyenne	ABC
September 20	Joe and Mabel	CBS
September 26	Jungle Jim	Syndication
September 27	Casablanca	ABC
September 28	Brave Eagle	CBS
September 29	Sergeant Preston of the Yukon	CBS
October 1	The Honeymooners	CBS
October 2	Alfred Hitchcock Presents	CBS
October 3	Captain Kangaroo	CBS
October 3	The Mickey Mouse Club	ABC
October 7	Crossroads	ABC
October 20	Wanted	CBS
October 31	Matinee Theatre	NBC

=== Changing network affiliation ===
Program	Moving from	Moving to
Life Is Worth Living	DuMont	ABC

=== Ending this year ===
Date	Program	Network	First aired	Status	Notes/References
January 1	China Smith	First-run syndication	June 1, 1952	Ended	
January 3	The Ilona Massey Show	DuMont	November 1, 1954	Ended	
January 9	Opera Cameos	DuMont	November 8, 1953	Ended	
January 27	So You Want to Lead a Band	ABC	August 5, 1954	Ended	
February 11	The Stranger	DuMont	June 25, 1954	Ended	
February 17	One Minute Please	DuMont	July 6, 1954	Ended	
February 26	Space Patrol	ABC	March 9, 1950	Ended	
March	Wrestling from Marigold	DuMont	September 17, 1949	Ended	
March 6	The Johns Hopkins Science Review	DuMont	March 9, 1948 (on CBS)	Ended	
March 11	The Jack Carson Show	NBC	October 22, 1954	Ended	
March 11	Stories of the Century	Syndication	1954	Canceled	
March 23	I Married Joan	NBC	October 15, 1952	Canceled	
April 1	Captain Video and His Video Rangers	DuMont	June 27, 1949	Ended	
April 1	DuMont Evening News	DuMont	September 1954	Ended	
April 2	The Vampira Show	ABC	April 30, 1954	Ended	
April 6	Concert Tonight	DuMont	December 30, 1953	Ended	
April 6	Norby	NBC	January 5, 1955	Canceled	
April 7	The Ernie Kovacs Show	DuMont	December 30, 1952 (on NBC)	Canceled	
April 8	Dear Phoebe	NBC	September 1954	Canceled	
April 13	The Stu Erwin Show	ABC	October 21, 1950	Canceled	
April 22	Where's Raymond?	ABC	October 1953	Canceled	
May 3	Twenty Questions	DuMont	November 2, 1949	Canceled	
May 4	The Best of Broadway	CBS	September 15, 1954	Canceled	
May 22	Key to the Ages	ABC	February 27, 1955	Canceled	
May 31	Danger	CBS	September 26, 1950	Ended	
June 12	Mister Peepers	NBC	July 3, 1952	Ended	
June 14	The Elgin Hour	ABC	June 14, 1955	Ended	
June 14	Have a Heart	DuMont	May 3, 1955	Ended	
June 16	Willy	CBS	September 1954	Canceled	
June 18	Foreign Intrigue	Syndication	October 18, 1951	Ended	
June 23	The Public Defender	First-run syndication	1954	Ended	
June 25	The Imogene Coca Show	First-run syndication	1954	Canceled	
June 25	Tom Corbett, Space Cadet	DuMont	October 2, 1950 (on CBS)	Ended	
June 26	The Pepsi-Cola Playhouse	ABC	1953	Canceled	
June 30	The Jane Froman Show	CBS	October 18, 1952	Ended	
July	All About Baby	DuMont	1953	Ended	
July 1	Concerning Miss Marlowe	NBC	July 5, 1954	Ended	
July 1	Hawkins Falls	NBC	June 17, 1950	Ended	
July 1	Treasury Men in Action	NBC	September 11, 1950 (on ABC)	Ended	
July 15	Flash Gordon	DuMont/Syndication	October 15, 1954	Canceled	
July 26	Who Said That?	NBC	December 9, 1948	Ended	
August 24	My Little Margie	NBC	June 16, 1952 (on CBS)	Canceled	
August 26	It's Alec Templeton Time	DuMont	June 3, 1955	Ended	
September 1	Life with Elizabeth	Syndication	October 7, 1953	Canceled	
September 3	The Soldiers	NBC	June 25, 1955	Ended	
September 10	The Donald O'Connor Show	NBC	October 9, 1954	Ended	
September 17	Musical Chairs	NBC	July 9, 1955	Canceled	
September 24	The Man Behind the Badge	CBS	October 11, 1953	Ended	
September 29	The Halls of Ivy	CBS	October 19, 1954	Ended	
September	Frankie Laine Time	CBS	July 20, 1955	Canceled	Returned for a short run in Summer 1956
October 2	The Philco Television Playhouse	NBC	October 3, 1948	Ended	
October 7	The Name's the Same	ABC	December 5, 1951	Ended	
October 17	Sherlock Holmes	ABC	October 18, 1954	Ended	
November 1	Talent Varieties	ABC	June 28, 1955	Ended	
November 22	The Adventures of Kit Carson	Syndication	August 11, 1951	Ended	
December 25	The Colgate Comedy Hour	NBC	September 10, 1950	Ended	
Unknown	The Jo Stafford Show	CBS	1954	Canceled	
Unknown	That's My Boy	CBS	1954	Canceled	
Unknown	Time for Beany	Paramount Television Network	February 28, 1949	Ended	
Unknown	The Red Buttons Show	CBS	October 14, 1952	Ended	
Unknown	NFL on DuMont	DuMont	1951	Ended	
Unknown	Waterfront	Syndication	August 21, 1954	Ended	

== Television stations ==
=== Station launches ===
Date	City of License/Market	Station	Channel	Affiliation	Notes/Ref.
January 1	West Palm Beach, Florida	WEAT-TV	12	ABC	
January 5	Minneapolis, Minnesota	KEYD-TV	9	DuMont	
January 7	Mt. Cheaha/Birmingham, Alabama	WCIQ	7	NET; Alabama Educational Television	
January 8	Chapel Hill, North Carolina (Raleigh/Durham)	WUNC-TV	4	NET/UNC-TV	
January 23	Las Vegas, Nevada	KLRJ-TV	2	NBC (primary); ABC (secondary)	
February 3	Fairbanks, Alaska	KTVF	11	CBS	
February 12	Dothan, Alabama	WTVY	9	CBS	
February 13	Jefferson City/Columbia, Missouri	KRCG	13	CBS (primary); ABC (secondary)	
February 14	St. Petersburg/Tampa, Florida	WXFL	8	NBC	
February 28	Phoenix, Arizona	KTVK	3	ABC	
March 1	Fairbanks, Alaska	KFAR-TV	2	NBC	
March 6	Jackson, Tennessee	WBBJ-TV	7	CBS	
March 8	Portland, Oregon	KLOR	12	ABC (primary); DuMont (secondary)	
March 14	Duluth, Minnesota	KDAL-TV	3	NBC (primary); ABC (secondary)	
March 15	Lexington, Kentucky	WLEX-TV	18	NBC (primary); ABC/DuMont/CBS (secondary)	
March 20	Sacramento, California	KBET-TV	10	CBS	
March 25	Lewiston, Maine	WLAM-TV	17	DuMont	
March 27	Providence, Rhode Island	WPRO-TV	12	CBS	
April 1	Tampa, Florida	WTVT	13	CBS	
April 3	Waco, Texas	KWTX-TV	10	Independent	
April 14	Baton Rouge, Louisiana	WBRZ-TV	2	NBC (primary); ABC (secondary)	
April 24	Beaumont, Texas	KFDM-TV	6	CBS	
April 24	Wailuku, Hawaii	KMAU-TV	9		
April 28	Birmingham, Alabama (Tuscaloosa)	WBIQ	10	NET/Alabama Educational Television	
May 2	Boston, Massachusetts	WGBH-TV	2	NET	
May 15	Hilo, Hawaii	KPUA-TV	9		
May 30	Twin Falls, Idaho	KLIX-TV	11	CBS (primary); ABC/NBC (secondary)	
June 1	Rapid City, South Dakota	KOTA-TV	23	CBS (primary); NBC/ABC (secondary)	
June 3	Lafayette, Louisiana	KLFY	10	CBS (primary); ABC (secondary)	
June 8	Hattiesburg, Mississippi	WDAM-TV	7	NBC (primary); ABC (secondary)	
June 10	San Antonio, Texas	KCOR-TV	41	Spanish independent	
July 15	South Bend, Indiana	WNDU	16	NBC	
July 31	Beckley/Bluefield, West Virginia	WHIS-TV	6	NBC	
July 31	Des Moines, Iowa	KRNT-TV	8	CBS	
August 1	Urbana, Illinois	WILL-TV	12	NET	
August 7	Scottsbluff, Nebraska	KSTF	10	ABC (primary); NBC (secondary)	
August 12	Miami, Florida	WTHS-TV	2	NET	
August 29	Fayetteville/Raleigh, North Carolina	WFLB-TV	18	ABC (primary); NBC/CBS (secondary)	
August 31	Lufkin, Texas	KTRE	9	NBC (as a satellite of KPRC-TV/Houston, Texas)	
September 1	Wichita, Kansas	KARD-TV	3	Independent	
September 3	Sacramento, California	KCRA	3	NBC	
September 3	Shreveport, Louisiana (Texarkana, TX-AR)	KTBS-TV	3	NBC	
September 5	Mobile, Alabama	WKRG-TV	5	CBS	
September 6	Chicago, Illinois	WTTW	11	NET	
September 11	Dallas, Texas	KFJZ-TV	11	Independent	
September 12	San Jose/San Francisco, California	KNTV	11	Independent	
September 15	Thomasville, Georgia/Tallahassee, Florida	WCTV	6	NBC	
September 24	Florence/Aberdeen, South Dakota	KDLO-TV	3	NBC	Satellite of KELO-TV of Sioux Falls
September 28	Washington/Greenville, North Carolina	WITN-TV	7	NBC (primary); ABC (secondary)	
October 2	Huntington, West Virginia	WOWK-TV	13	ABC	
October 3	Detroit, Michigan	WTVS	56	NET	
October 3	Roanoke, Virginia	WDBJ-TV	7	CBS	
October 8	Yuma, Arizona	KIVA	11		
October 12	Mayaguez/Aguadilla, Puerto Rico	WORA-TV	5	Independent	
November 19	Bismarck, North Dakota	KBMB-TV	12	CBS (primary); ABC (secondary)	
November 21	Kirksville, Missouri/Ottumwa, Iowa	KTVO	3	CBS (primary); NBC (secondary)	
November 27	Little Rock, Arkansas	KTHV	11	CBS	
December 3	El Dorado, Arkansas (Monroe, Louisiana)	KRBB-TV	10	NBC (primary); ABC (secondary)	
December 4	Wailuku, Hawaii	KMVI-TV	4	ABC	Satellite of KULA-TV (now KITV) in Honolulu
December 7	Lewiston, Idaho	KLEW-TV	3	CBS (primary); ABC/NBC (secondary)	
December 11	Fargo, North Dakota	KNOX-TV	10	ABC (primary); NBC (secondary)	

=== Network affiliation changes ===
Date	City of license/Market	Station	Channel	Old affiliation	New affiliation	Notes/Ref.
February 27	Milwaukee, Wisconsin	WXIX-TV	19	ABC (primary); DuMont (secondary)	CBS	
March	Wilmington, Delaware	WVUE	12	NBC	Independent	
September	Waco, Texas	KWTX-TV	10	Independent	ABC	
Unknown date	Little Rock, Arkansas	KATV	7	CBS (primary); ABC (secondary)	ABC (exclusive)	
Unknown date	Minneapolis, Minnesota	KEYD-TV	5	DuMont	Independent	
Unknown date	Mobile, Alabama	WEAR-TV	3	CBS	ABC	
Unknown date	Shreveport, Louisiana	KSLA	12	CBS (primary); ABC and DuMont (secondary)	CBS (primary); ABC (secondary)	

== Station closures ==
Date	City of license/Market	Station	Channel	Affiliation	First air date	Notes/Ref.
February 2	Monterey, California	KMBY-TV	8	ABC/CBS/NBC/DuMont	August 17, 1953	Shared time with KSBW-TV
February 4	Oklahoma City, Oklahoma	KMPT	19	Independent	November 22, 1953	
February 12	Charleston, West Virginia	WKNA-TV	49	ABC (primary); DuMont (secondary)	September 17, 1953	
February 26	Milwaukee, Wisconsin	WCAN-TV	25	CBS	September 6, 1953	
February 28	Fairmont, West Virginia	WJPB-TV	35	ABC (primary); NBC/DuMont (secondary)	March 17, 1954	
March 15	Charlotte, North Carolina	WAYS-TV	36	ABC (primary); NBC/DuMont (secondary)		
April 1	Asbury Park, New Jersey	WRTV	58	Independent	December 14, 1953	Not to be confused with today's WRTV in Indianapolis, Indiana
April 3	St. Paul/Minneapolis, Minnesota	WMIN-TV	11	ABC/DuMont	September 1, 1953	Shared time with KARE (now WTCN-TV)
April 15	Des Moines, Iowa	KGTV	17	Independent	November 14, 1953	
April 30	Stockton, California	KTVU	36	NBC	December 15, 1953	Not to be confused with the present-day KTVU in the San Francisco Bay Area.
May 31	Atlanta, Georgia	WQXI-TV	36	Independent	October 13, 1954	
June 30	Reading, Pennsylvania	WEEU-TV	33	NBC	April 9, 1953	
July 1	Newport News/Norfolk, Virginia	WACH-TV	33	Independent	October 8, 1953	
July 15	Providence, Rhode Island	WNET	16	ABC (primary); DuMont (Secondary)	March 23, 1954	
August 1	Jackson, Mississippi	WSLI	12	ABC	March 27, 1954	This station's operations merged with those of CBS affiliate WJTV to allow that station to move from UHF channel 25 to VHF channel 12.
December 15	Oklahoma City, Oklahoma	KTVQ	25	ABC	November 1, 1953	
December 18	Pensacola, Florida	WPFA-TV	15	DuMont	October 16, 1953	

== See also ==
- 1955 in television
- 1955 in film
- 1955 in the United States
- List of American films of 1955
