= 1954–55 United States network television schedule =

The following is the 1954–55 network television schedule for the four major English language commercial broadcast networks in the United States. The schedule covers primetime hours from September 1954 through March 1955. The schedule is followed by a list per network of returning series, new series, and series cancelled after the 1953–54 season.

Fall 1954 marked a big change for television when ABC announced a network deal with a significant Hollywood producer. ABC had contracted with Walt Disney to produce a new series called Disneyland (as part of the deal, the network provided funding towards the construction of Walt's amusement park of the same name, opening in July 1955). The series was an instant hit, and marked the beginning of the networks allowing Hollywood programs into their schedules. Thus, Disney became the third significant Hollywood film producer to venture into television production, after Jerry Fairbanks and Hal Roach.

ABC president Leonard Goldenson decided in early 1954 that a television network was not the place for religious programs; as a result, Billy Graham's religious series, Hour of Decision, did not appear on ABC's fall 1954 schedule. Goldenson told Graham that the series was canceled because the poor ratings the series received were hurting the "flow" of ABC's entertainment programs. However, later critics, such as R.D. Heldenfels (1994), reject the stated reason for the cancellation. According to Heldenfels, since Hour of Decision was the last program that ABC aired on Sunday nights (at 10:30), "flow would not have been an issue"; ABC did not air anything in place of the canceled series and gave the slot back to its local affiliates. Heldenfels believes Goldenson "simply felt uncomfortable about organized religion". Another 1953–54 ABC religious series, This Is the Life, also failed to make the 1954–55 ABC schedule.

DuMont's 1954–55 schedule would be the last year the failing television network planned a seven night program schedule, and even this schedule was full of holes. Heldenfels states that the 1954 DuMont schedule "was a checkerboard of programs and empty spaces for [local] stations to fill". DuMont did not bother to schedule anything against ABC's Disneyland, NBC's new series Caesar's Hour, or either of CBS's Arthur Godfrey programs, conceding those slots (and others) to the bigger networks. However, DuMont continued to air Bishop Fulton Sheen's program Life Is Worth Living against NBC's popular The Buick-Berle Show. DuMont's counter-programming strategy, scheduling a religious program against Milton Berle's bawdy show, had met with success in previous years. The rivalry between the programs had caused Berle to joke, "He uses old material, too." Sheen, for his part, once introduced himself as "Uncle Fultie". Still, DuMont's limited success in counter-programming a few slots would not be enough to save the network; Heldenfels states that the DuMont network's programs "resemble the grasping of program straws as much or more as they look like a strategic plan." DuMont would cancel Life Is Worth Living in April 1955, along with most of its remaining programs.

New fall series are highlighted in bold.

Each of the 30 highest-rated shows is listed with its rank and rating as determined by Nielsen Media Research.

Yellow indicates the programs in the top 10 for the season.
Cyan indicates the programs in the top 20 for the season.
Magenta indicates the programs in the top 30 for the season.

== Sunday ==
Network		7:00 PM	7:30 PM	8:00 PM	8:30 PM	9:00 PM	9:30 PM	10:00 PM	10:30 PM
ABC		You Asked For It	The Pepsi-Cola Playhouse	**Flight No. 7**	The Big Picture	The Walter Winchell Show (9:00) / The Martha Wright Show (9:15)	Soldier Parade	Break the Bank	Local
CBS	Fall	**Lassie**	The Jack Benny Show (7/38.3) / Private Secretary (19/32.2)	Toast of the Town (5/39.6)		General Electric Theater (17/32.6)	**Honestly, Celeste!**	**Father Knows Best**	What's My Line?
CBS	Spring	**Lassie**	The Jack Benny Show (7/38.3) / Private Secretary (19/32.2)	Toast of the Town (5/39.6)		General Electric Theater (17/32.6)	**Honestly, Celeste!**	**Appointment with Adventure**	What's My Line?
NBC	Fall	**People Are Funny**	Mister Peepers	The Colgate Comedy Hour (27/28.0)		The Philco Television Playhouse / Goodyear Television Playhouse		The Loretta Young Show (28/27.7)	The Hunter
NBC	Winter	**People Are Funny**	Mister Peepers	The Colgate Comedy Hour (27/28.0)		The Philco Television Playhouse / Goodyear Television Playhouse		The Loretta Young Show (28/27.7)	**The Bob Cummings Show**
DMN		Local	Opera Cameos	Local		Rocky King, Inside Detective	Life Begins at Eighty	The Music Show	Local

- On NBC, The Roy Rogers Show (30/26.9) aired 6:30–7:00 pm, and the Sunday edition of Max Liebman Presents made its debut as a monthly series, airing 7:30–9:00 pm On CBS, beginning this season, The Jack Benny Program alternated with Private Secretary as a bi-weekly series.
- Appointment with Adventure, an anthology series, appeared for the first of fifty-three episodes on the CBS 1954–1955 Sunday schedule at 10:00 pm EST, beginning April 3, 1955.

== Monday ==
Network		7:00 PM	7:30 PM	8:00 PM	8:30 PM	9:00 PM	9:30 PM	10:00 PM	10:30 PM
ABC	Fall	Kukla, Fran and Ollie (7:00) / John Daly and the News (7:15)	Jamie	**Come Closer**	The Voice of Firestone	**College Press Conference**	Boxing from Eastern Parkway		
ABC	October	Kukla, Fran and Ollie (7:00) / John Daly and the News (7:15)	The Name's the Same	**Come Closer**	The Voice of Firestone	**College Press Conference**	Boxing from Eastern Parkway		
CBS		Local	Douglas Edwards with the News (7:30) / The Perry Como Show (7:45)	The George Burns and Gracie Allen Show (26/29.0)	Arthur Godfrey's Talent Scouts (18/32.5)	I Love Lucy (1/49.3)	**December Bride** (10/34.7)	Westinghouse Studio One	
NBC		Local	The Tony Martin Show (7:30) / Camel News Caravan (7:45)	**Caesar's Hour**		**Medic**	Robert Montgomery Presents		Local
DMN		Captain Video (7:00) / **DuMont Evening News** (7:15)	Local	The Ilona Massey Show	Local	Boxing From St. Nicholas Arena			

Note: On NBC, Producers' Showcase made its debut as a monthly series, airing 8:00–9:30 pm

== Tuesday ==
Network		7:00 PM	7:30 PM	8:00 PM	8:30 PM	9:00 PM	9:30 PM	10:00 PM	10:30 PM
ABC		Kukla, Fran and Ollie (7:00) / John Daly and the News (7:15)	Cavalcade of America	Local	Twenty Questions	Make Room for Daddy	The United States Steel Hour / **The Elgin TV Hour**		Stop the Music
CBS	Fall	Local	Douglas Edwards with the News (7:30) / The Jo Stafford Show (7:45)	The Red Skelton Show	The Blue Angel	Meet Millie	Danger	Life with Father	See It Now
CBS	Follow-up	Local	Douglas Edwards with the News (7:30) / The Jo Stafford Show (7:45)	The Red Skelton Show	**The Halls of Ivy**	Meet Millie	Danger	Life with Father	See It Now
CBS	Summer	Local	Douglas Edwards with the News (7:30) / The Jo Stafford Show (7:45)	The Red Skelton Show	**Music 55**	Meet Millie	**The $64,000 Question**	Life with Father	See It Now
NBC		Local	The Dinah Shore Show (7:30) / Plymouth News Caravan (7:45)	The Buick-Berle Show (11/34.6) / The Bob Hope Show / The Martha Raye Show		Fireside Theatre (20/31.1)	Armstrong Circle Theatre	Truth or Consequences	**It's a Great Life**
DMN		Captain Video (7:00) / **DuMont Evening News** (7:15)	Local	Life Is Worth Living	**Studio 57**	One Minute Please	Local		

Note: Beginning this season, Chrysler's Plymouth division alternated with R.J. Reynolds as sponsor of Camel News Caravan on Tuesdays and Thursdays. The Bob Hope Show and The Martha Raye Show each appeared monthly.

== Wednesday ==
Network		7:00 PM	7:30 PM	8:00 PM	8:30 PM	9:00 PM	9:30 PM	10:00 PM	10:30 PM
ABC		Kukla, Fran and Ollie (7:00) / John Daly and the News (7:15)	**Disneyland** (6/39.1)		The Stu Erwin Show	Masquerade Party	Enterprise	Local	
CBS	Fall	Local	Douglas Edwards with the News (7:30) / The Perry Como Show (7:45)	Arthur Godfrey and His Friends (22/29.8)		Strike It Rich	I've Got a Secret (13/34.0)	Pabst Blue Ribbon Bouts (10:00) (25/29.1) / Sports Spot (10:45) / **The Best of Broadway** (10:00–11:00) (once a month)	
CBS	Winter	Local	Douglas Edwards with the News (7:30) / The Perry Como Show (7:45)	Arthur Godfrey and His Friends (22/29.8)		**The Millionaire** (16/33.0)	I've Got a Secret (13/34.0)	Pabst Blue Ribbon Bouts (10:00) (25/29.1) / Sports Spot (10:45) / **The Best of Broadway** (10:00–11:00) (once a month)	
NBC	Fall	Local	Coke Time with Eddie Fisher (7:30) / Camel News Caravan (7:45)	I Married Joan	My Little Margie (29/27.1)	Kraft Television Theatre		This Is Your Life (12/34.5)	Big Town
NBC	Winter	**Norby** (In COLOR)	Coke Time with Eddie Fisher (7:30) / Camel News Caravan (7:45)	I Married Joan	My Little Margie (29/27.1)	Kraft Television Theatre		This Is Your Life (12/34.5)	Big Town
NBC	Spring	**Kodak Request Performance** (In COLOR)	Coke Time with Eddie Fisher (7:30) / Camel News Caravan (7:45)	I Married Joan	My Little Margie (29/27.1)	Kraft Television Theatre		This Is Your Life (12/34.5)	Big Town
DMN		Captain Video (7:00) / **DuMont Evening News** (7:15)	Local			Concert Tonight (Chicago Symphony)		Down You Go	Local

== Thursday ==
Network		7:00 PM	7:30 PM	8:00 PM	8:30 PM	9:00 PM	9:30 PM	10:00 PM	10:30 PM
ABC		Kukla, Fran and Ollie (7:00) / John Daly and the News (7:15)	The Lone Ranger	The Mail Story	Treasury Men in Action	So You Want to Lead a Band	Kraft Television Theatre		Local
CBS	Fall	Local	Douglas Edwards with the News (7:30) / The Jane Froman Show (7:45)	The Ray Milland Show*	**Climax!** / **Shower of Stars** (once a month)		Four Star Playhouse	The Public Defender	Name That Tune
CBS	Spring	Local	Douglas Edwards with the News (7:30) / The Jane Froman Show (7:45)	The Ray Milland Show*	**Climax!** / **Shower of Stars** (once a month)		Four Star Playhouse	The Public Defender	Willy
CBS	Summer	Local	Douglas Edwards with the News (7:30) / The Jane Froman Show (7:45)	The Bob Cummings Show	**Climax!** / **Shower of Stars** (once a month)		Four Star Playhouse	The Public Defender	Willy
NBC		Local	The Dinah Shore Show (7:30) / Plymouth News Caravan (7:45)	You Bet Your Life (4/41.0)	Justice	Dragnet (3/42.1)	Ford Theatre (In COLOR) (9/34.9)	Lux Video Theatre	
DMN		Captain Video (7:00) / **DuMont Evening News** (7:15)	Local	They Stand Accused		What's the Story	Local		

* formerly Meet Mr. McNutley

Note: On CBS, Willy moved from Saturday to Thursday in April.

== Friday ==
Network	7:00 PM	7:30 PM	8:00 PM	8:30 PM	9:00 PM	9:30 PM	10:00 PM	10:30 PM
ABC	Kukla, Fran and Ollie (7:00) / John Daly and the News (7:15)	**The Adventures of Rin Tin Tin** (23/29.5)	The Adventures of Ozzie and Harriet	The Ray Bolger Show*	Dollar a Second	**The Vise**	Local	
CBS	Local	Douglas Edwards with the News (7:30) / The Perry Como Show (7:45)	Mama	Topper (24/29.4)	Schlitz Playhouse of Stars	Our Miss Brooks	**The Lineup**	Person to Person
NBC	Local	Coke Time with Eddie Fisher (7:30) / Camel News Caravan (7:45)	The Red Buttons Show / The Jack Carson Show (once a month)	The Life of Riley (21/30.9)	The Big Story	**Dear Phoebe**	Gillette Cavalcade of Sports (10:00) / The Greatest Moments in Sports (10:45)	
DMN	Captain Video (7:00) / **DuMont Evening News** (7:15)	Local	The Stranger	Local	Chance of a Lifetime	**Time Will Tell**	Local	

* formerly Where's Raymond?

== Saturday ==
Network		7:00 PM	7:30 PM	8:00 PM	8:30 PM	9:00 PM	9:30 PM	10:00 PM	10:30 PM
ABC	Fall	Local	Compass	The Dotty Mack Show		The Saturday Night Fights (9:00) / Fight Talk (9:45)		The Stork Club	Local
ABC	January	Local	Compass	The Dotty Mack Show		**Ozark Jubilee**		The Stork Club	Local
CBS	Fall	The Gene Autry Show	Beat the Clock	The Jackie Gleason Show (2/42.4)		Two for the Money (14/33.9)	My Favorite Husband	That's My Boy	Willy
CBS	Winter	The Gene Autry Show	Beat the Clock	The Jackie Gleason Show (2/42.4)		Two for the Money (14/33.9)	My Favorite Husband	**Professional Father**	Willy
CBS	Spring	The Gene Autry Show	Beat the Clock	The Jackie Gleason Show (2/42.4)		Two for the Money (14/33.9)	My Favorite Husband	**Professional Father**	**Damon Runyon Theater**
CBS	Summer	The Gene Autry Show	Beat the Clock	**America's Greatest Bands**		Two for the Money (14/33.9)	My Favorite Husband	**Professional Father**	**Damon Runyon Theater**
NBC	Fall	Watch Mr. Wizard	Ethel and Albert	**The Mickey Rooney Show: Hey, Mulligan**	Place the Face	**The Imogene Coca Show**	**Texaco Star Theater**: **The Jimmy Durante Show** / **The Donald O'Connor Show**	**The George Gobel Show** (8/35.2)	Your Hit Parade (15/33.6)
NBC	Summer	Watch Mr. Wizard	Ethel and Albert	**The Soldiers**	**The Amazing Dunninger**	**Musical Chairs**	**Texaco Star Theater**: **The Jimmy Durante Show** / **The Donald O'Connor Show**	**And Here's the Show**	Your Hit Parade (15/33.6)
DMN		Local		National Football League Professional Football					

Note: On NBC, the Saturday edition of Max Liebman Presents debuted as a monthly series, airing 9:00–10:30 pm. On ABC, Ozark Jubilee premiered in January from 9:00–10:00 p.m. On CBS, Willy moved from Saturday to Thursday in April.

The Soldiers, a live military sitcom starring Hal March, Tom D'Andrea, and John Dehner, produced and directed by Bud Yorkin, aired eleven episodes on NBC Saturday schedule between June 25 and September 3, 1955.

== By network ==
=== ABC ===
**Returning Series**

- The Adventures of Ozzie and Harriet
- Bachelor Father
- The Big Picture
- Boxing from Eastern Parkway
- Break the Bank
- Cavalcade of America
- Compass
- Dollar a Second
- The Dotty Mack Show
- Enterprise
- Fight Talk
- Jamie
- John Daly and the News
- Kraft Television Theater
- Kukla, Fran and Ollie
- The Lone Ranger
- Make Room for Daddy
- The Martha Wright Show
- Masquerade Party
- The Name's the Same
- The Pepsi-Cola Playhouse
- The Ray Bolger Show
- The Saturday Night Fights
- So You Want to Lead a Band
- Soldier Parade
- Stop the Music
- The Stork Club
- The Stu Erwin Show
- Treasury Men in Action
- Twenty Questions
- The United States Steel Hour
- The Voice of Firestone
- The Walter Winchell Show
- You Asked For It

**New Series**

- **The Adventures of Rin Tin Tin**
- **College Press Conference**
- **Come Closer**
- **Disneyland**
- **The Elgin TV Hour**
- **Flight No. 7**
- **The Jane Pickens Show**
- **Key to the Ages** *
- **Let's See** *
- **The Mail Story**
- **Mr. Citizen** *
- **Ozark Jubilee**
- **Paris Precinct** *
- **Pond's Theater** *
- **So You Want to Lead a Band**
- **Star Tonight** *
- **TV Reader's Digest** *
- **The Vise**
- **What's Going On** *

Not returning from 1953–54:

- Answers for Americans
- At Issue
- Back That Fact
- Billy Graham's Hour of Decision
- Center Stage
- The Comeback Story
- Dr. I.Q.
- The Ern Westmore Hollywood Glamour Show
- The Frank Leahy Show
- The George Jessel Show
- Jukebox Jury
- Junior Press Conference
- Leave It to the Girls
- Madison Square Garden Highlights
- The Motorola Television Hour
- Music at the Meadowbrook
- The Name's the Same
- Notre Dame Football
- Of Many Things
- The Orchid Award
- Paul Whiteman's TV Teen Club
- The Pride of the Family
- Quick as a Flash
- Showcase Theater
- Sky King
- Take It from Me
- Talent Patrol
- This is the Life
- Through the Curtain
- Wrestling from Rainbo Arena

=== CBS ===
**Returning Series**

- Arthur Godfrey's Talent Scouts
- Beat the Clock
- The Blue Angel
- The Bob Cummings Show
- Danger
- Douglas Edwards with the News
- Four Star Playhouse
- The Garry Moore Show
- The Gene Autry Show
- The George Burns and Gracie Allen Show
- I Love Lucy
- I've Got a Secret
- The Jack Benny Show
- The Jackie Gleason Show
- The Jane Froman Show
- The Jo Stafford Show
- Life with Father
- Mama
- Meet Millie
- My Favorite Husband
- Name That Tune
- Omnibus
- Our Miss Brooks
- Pabst Blue Ribbon Bouts
- The Perry Como Show
- Person to Person
- Private Secretary
- The Public Defender
- The Ray Milland Show
- The Red Skelton Show
- Schlitz Playhouse of Stars
- See It Now
- Sports Spot
- Strike It Rich
- That's My Boy
- Toast of the Town
- Topper
- Two for the Money
- Westinghouse Studio One
- What in the World?
- Willy
- Your Play Time

**New Series**

- **The $64,000 Question** *
- **America's Greatest Bands** *
- **Appointment with Adventure** *
- **The Best of Broadway**
- **Climax!**
- **Damon Runyon Theater** *
- **December Bride**
- **Father Knows Best**
- **Frankie Laine Time** *
- **The Halls of Ivy** *
- **Honestly, Celeste!**
- **Lassie**
- **The Lineup**
- **The Millionaire** *
- **Music 55** *
- **Professional Father** *
- **Shower of Stars**
- **Stage 7** *
- **Stage Show**
- **Windows** *

Not returning from 1953–54:

- The Fred Waring Show
- The Gene Autry Show
- The Jane Froman Show
- The Man Behind the Badge
- Medallion Theatre
- Meet Mr. McNutley
- My Friend Irma
- Pentagon U.S.A.
- The Perry Como Show (returned in 1955 on NBC)
- Philip Morris Playhouse
- The Public Defender
- Quiz Kids
- The Revlon Mirror Theater
- Suspense
- This is Show Business
- The Web

=== DuMont ===
**Returning series**

- Boxing from St. Nicholas Arena
- Captain Video
- Chance of a Lifetime
- Concert Tonight
- Down You Go
- The Ilona Massey Show
- Life Begins at Eighty
- Life is Worth Living
- The Music Show
- National Football League Professional Football
- One Minute Please
- Opera Cameos
- Rocky King, Inside Detective
- The Stranger
- They Stand Accused
- What's the Story?

**New series**

- **DuMont Evening News**
- **Flash Gordon**
- **Have a Heart** *
- **It's Alec Templeton Time** *
- **The Paul Dixon Show** *
- **Studio 57**
- **Time Will Tell**

Not returning from 1953–54:

- Better Living TV theatre
- The Big Issue
- Broadway to Hollywood – Headline Clues
- Colonel Humphrey Flack (returned in 1958 in syndication)
- Front Page Detective
- Gamble on Love
- Guide Right
- The Johns Hopkins Science Review
- The Igor Cassini Show
- Joseph Schildkraut Presents
- Love Story
- Man Against Crime
- Marge and Jeff
- Melody Street
- Night Editor
- Nine Thirty Curtain
- On Your Way
- Pantomime Quiz
- The Plainclothesman
- Pro Football Highlights
- Pulse of the City
- Stars on Parade
- The Strawhatters
- Washington Exclusive

=== NBC ===
**Returning Series**

- Armstrong Circle Theatre
- The Big Story
- Big Town
- The Bob Hope Show
- The Buick-Berle Show
- Camel News Caravan
- Cameo Theatre
- Coke Time with Eddie Fisher
- The Colgate Comedy Hour
- The Dinah Shore Show
- Dragnet
- Ethel and Albert
- Fireside Theatre
- Ford Theatre
- Gillette Cavalcade of Sports
- Goodyear Television Playhouse
- The Greatest Moments in Sports
- The Hunter
- I Married Joan
- The Jack Carson Show
- Justice
- Kraft Television Theatre
- The Life of Riley
- The Loretta Young Show
- Lux Video Theatre (moved from CBS)
- The Martha Raye Show
- Mister Peepers
- My Little Margie
- The Philco Television Playhouse
- Place the Face
- The Red Buttons Show (moved from CBS)
- Robert Montgomery Presents
- The Roy Rogers Show
- Texaco Star Theater
- This Is Your Life
- The Tony Martin Show
- Truth or Consequences
- Watch Mr. Wizard
- The World of Mr. Sweeney
- You Bet Your Life
- Your Favorite Story
- Your Hit Parade

**New Series**

- **The Amazing Dunninger** *
- **And Here's the Show** *
- **The Bob Cummings Show** *
- **Caesar's Hour**
- **Commando Cody: Sky Marshal of the Universe** *
- **The Donald O'Connor Show**
- **The George Gobel Show**
- **The Imogene Coca Show**
- **The Jimmy Durante Show**
- **Make the Connection** *
- **Max Liebman Spectaculars**
- **Medic**
- **The Mickey Rooney Show: Hey, Mulligan**
- **Mister Peepers**
- **Musical Chairs** *
- **Norby** *
- **Producers' Showcase**
- **The Soldiers** *

Not returning from 1953–54:

- Bank on the Stars
- The Best in Mystery
- Bonino
- Campbell Sounstage
- Cheer Television Theatre
- The Dave Garroway Show
- The Dennis Day Show
- Inner Sanctum
- It Happened in Sports
- Judge for Yourself
- The Kate Smith Evening Hour
- Letter to Loretta
- Man Against Crime
- The Marriage
- Martin Kane, Private Eye
- On the Line with Considine
- The Spike Jones Show
- Summer Playhouse (returned in 1957)
- Your Favorite Story
- Your Show of Shows

Note: The * indicates that the program was introduced in midseason.
