= Jo Stafford filmography =

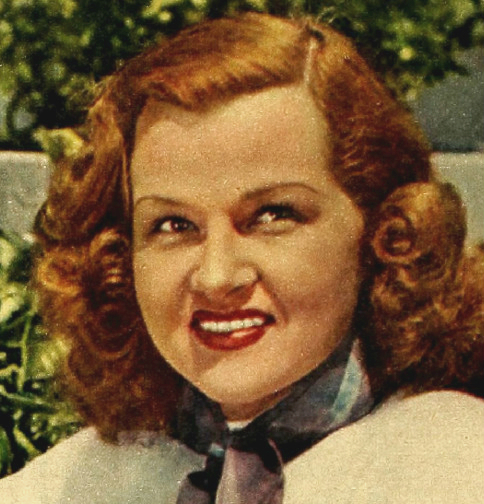
Jo Stafford pictured in 1949

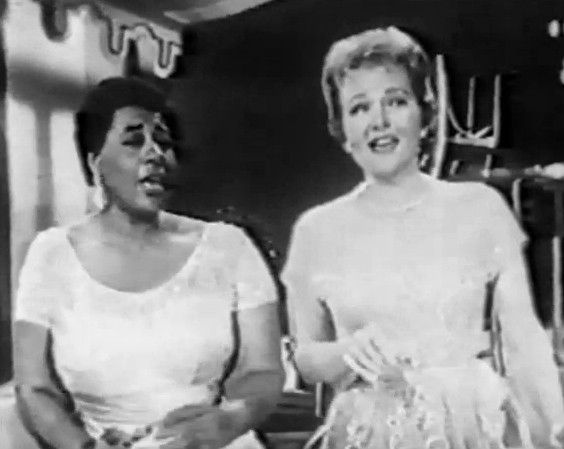
Ella Fitzgerald & Stafford on Swing Into Spring, 1958

The following is a list of film and television appearances by American singer Jo Stafford. Although primarily a singer, Stafford made many film and television appearances throughout her career. Her filmography includes both guest spots and acting roles, spanning the decades from the 1930s when she appeared with her sisters in films such as Avenging Waters (1936) and Alexander's Ragtime Band (1938) through to her final appearance in the Frank Sinatra tribute Sinatra 75: The Best Is Yet to Come in 1990. Along the way Stafford appeared in series such as What's My Line? and Shower of Stars, as well as presenting two separate series titled The Jo Stafford Show which were recorded on two opposite sides of the Atlantic, in 1954 and 1961 respectively.

== As herself ==
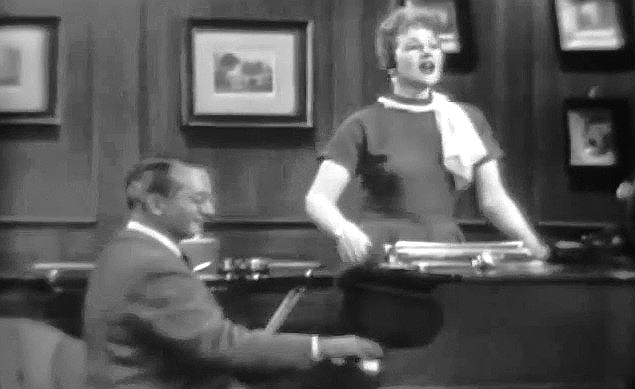
Stafford with husband Paul Weston appearing in a 1958 edition of Shower of Stars as Jonathan and Darlene Edwards.

Year	Title
1990	Sinatra 75: The Best Is Yet to Come
1963-1964	The Danny Kaye Show
1963	The Jimmy Dean Show
1960-1962	The Bell Telephone Hour
1960-1962	The Garry Moore Show
1961	The Bob Newhart Show
1961	The Jo Stafford Show
1960	Startime
1959-1960	The Steve Allen Show
1959	Spectacular/Val Parnell's Spectacular
1959	Val Parnell's Sunday Night at the London Palladium
1959	The Pat Boone Chevy Showroom
1959	The Bing Crosby Special
1959	The Dinah Shore Chevy Show
1958-1959	The Voice of Firestone
1958	Swing Into Spring
1958	The George Gobel Show
1958	The Red Skelton Show/Friends of Red Skelton Variety Show
1957-1958	The Ed Sullivan Show
1958	Shower of Stars
1957	The Tennessee Ernie Ford Show
1956	What's My Line?
1956	The Perry Como Show
1956	The Jackie Gleason Show
1954	The Jo Stafford Show

== Acting roles ==
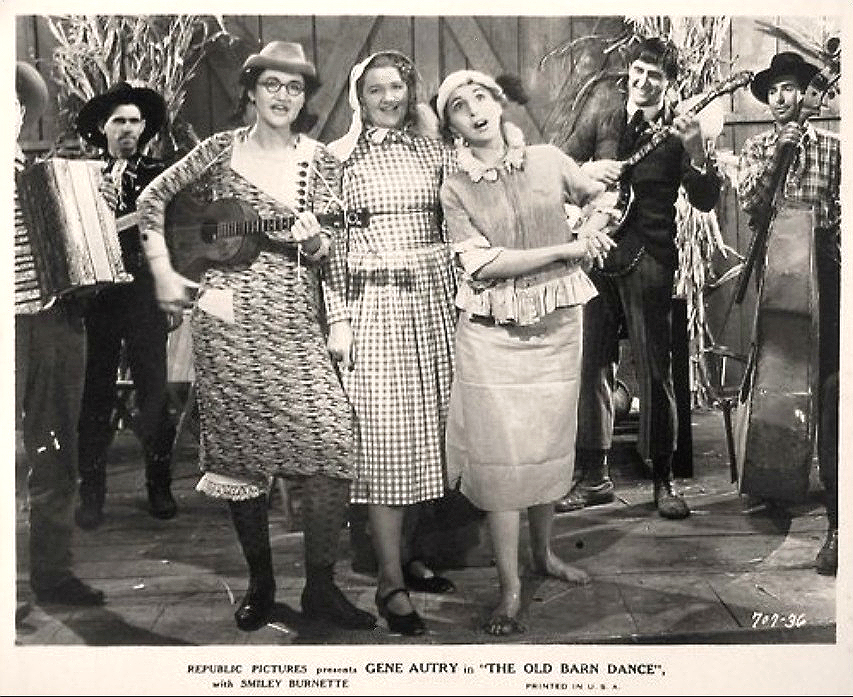
The Stafford Sisters in The Old Barn Dance (1938)

Year	Title	Notes
1962-1964	The Red Skelton Hour	Clara Appleby / Darlene Edwards
1960	The Garry Moore Show	Darlene Edwards
1960	Startime	Cinderella G. Stump
1958	The Sid Caesar Show/Sid Caesar Invites You	
1958	Shower of Stars	Darlene Edwards
1945	Rhythm Round-Up AKA; Honest John	As member of The Pied Pipers
1944	Jam Session	As member of The Pied Pipers
1943	Upbeat in Music	As member of The Pied Pipers
1943	Girl Crazy	As member of The Stafford Sisters (uncredited); As member of The Pied Pipers (uncredited)
1943	Gals, Incorporated	As member of The Pied Pipers
1943	Du Barry Was a Lady	As member of The Pied Pipers (uncredited)
1942	Ship Ahoy	As member of The Pied Pipers
1941	Las Vegas Nights AKA; The Gay City	As member of The Pied Pipers (uncredited)
1939	Honolulu	As member of The Pied Pipers (uncredited)
1938	Goldmine in the Sky	As member of The Stafford Sisters
1938	Alexander's Ragtime Band	As member of The Stafford Sisters (uncredited)
1938	The Old Barn Dance	As member of The Stafford Sisters
1936	Avenging Waters	As member of The Stafford Sisters (uncredited)
