= The Jo Stafford Show =

The Jo Stafford Show could refer to:

- The Jo Stafford Show (1954 TV series), a 1954–55 American musical variety program
- The Jo Stafford Show (1961 TV series), a 1961 British variety television programme
