= Time Will Tell (game show) =

- Presented by: Ernie Kovacs
- Narrated by: Robert Russell
- Country of origin: United States

Production
- Running time: 30 minutes
- Production company: Adams-Davis Productions

Original release
- Network: DuMont
- Release: August 27 – October 15, 1954

Time Will Tell is an early American game show that aired on the DuMont Television Network Fridays at 10:30 pm ET from August 27 to October 15, 1954. The host was Ernie Kovacs. Don Russell was the announcer, and Eddie Hatrak provided music.

Game play involved three contestants answering questions in 90-second rounds, timed with a large hourglass.

The sustaining program, produced and distributed by the network, aired on most DuMont affiliates on Fridays at 10:30 pm Eastern Time, replacing Gamble on Love, the previous game show in that time slot which was initially hosted by Denise Darcel until August when Ernie Kovacs took over that show. After Time Will Tell ended, DuMont replaced the series with local (non-network) programming.

== Episode status ==
DuMont, like NBC and CBS during the 1950s, probably kept at least one or two "example" episodes of each of its main game shows, though DuMont's exact policy is not known. However, DuMont's archive was destroyed after the network ceased broadcasting in 1956. Although a small number of DuMont game show episodes are known to exist in various archives, none are known to exist of either Time will Tell nor Gamble on Love.

== See also ==
- List of programs broadcast by the DuMont Television Network
- List of surviving DuMont Television Network broadcasts
- 1954-55 United States network television schedule

== Bibliography ==
- David Weinstein, The Forgotten Network: DuMont and the Birth of American Television (Philadelphia: Temple University Press, 2004) ISBN 1-59213-245-6
- Tim Brooks and Earle Marsh, The Complete Directory to Prime Time Network and Cable TV Shows 1946–Present, Ninth edition (New York: Ballantine Books, 2007) ISBN 978-0-345-49773-4
- David Schwartz, Steve Ryan and Fred Wostbrock (1995) The Encyclopedia of American Game Shows, Second edition (New York: Facts on File Inc., 1995) ISBN 0-8160-3094-4
