= The Music Show (American TV program) =

- Presented by: Mike Douglas; Henri Noel; Dolores Peterson; Robert Trendler; Jackie Van; Eleanor Warner
- Country of origin: United States

Production
- Producer: WGN-TV
- Running time: 30 minutes

Original release
- Network: DuMont
- Release: May 19, 1953 – October 17, 1954

The Music Show is an early American television program which was broadcast on the now defunct DuMont Television Network from May 1953 to October 1954.

== Broadcast history ==
The series ran from May 1953 to October 1954. The show was a musical program broadcast live from WGN-TV in Chicago, featuring the vocal talents of Mike Douglas, Henri Noel, Eleanor Warner, Jackie Van, and (in 1954) Dolores Peterson.

Robert Trendler conducted a 34-piece orchestra. The Music Show originally aired Tuesday nights at 9 (EST) on most DuMont affiliates. The series moved to 8:30 in July, and to 10:30 on Wednesday nights in October. In January 1954, The Music Show began airing at 10:00. Finally, from September to October 1954, the program was broadcast on Sundays at 10 PM.

The Music Show was only one of several DuMont Network series to be broadcast from Chicago; others included The Al Morgan Show, Concert Tonight, Chicagoland Mystery Players, Music From Chicago, They Stand Accused, This Is Music, Windy City Jamboree, and the Emmy-nominated game show Down You Go. All of these series were broadcast from DuMont affiliate WGN-TV over the DuMont Network.

== See also ==
- List of programs broadcast by the DuMont Television Network
- List of surviving DuMont Television Network broadcasts
- This Is Music
- Music From Chicago
- Concert Tonight

== Bibliography ==
- David Weinstein, The Forgotten Network: DuMont and the Birth of American Television (Philadelphia: Temple University Press, 2004) ISBN 1-59213-245-6
- Alex McNeil, Total Television, Fourth edition (New York: Penguin Books, 1980) ISBN 0-14-024916-8
- Tim Brooks and Earle Marsh, The Complete Directory to Prime Time Network TV Shows, Third edition (New York: Ballantine Books, 1964) ISBN 0-345-31864-1
