= Chicagoland Mystery Players =

American TV police drama (1949–1950)

- Genre: Mystery
- Directed by: Ernest Lukas
- Starring: Robert Smith; Gordon Urquart
- Country of origin: United States
- Original language: English

Production
- Running time: 30 minutes

Original release
- Network: WGN-TV (1947-50); DuMont (1949-50)
- Release: September 11, 1949 – July 23, 1950

Chicagoland Mystery Players, a police procedural, is "television's first crime series". The series began in a local TV market before being picked up nationally, one of several series on the DuMont network which started that way.

== Local origin ==
The live television series was first shown locally in Chicago in 1947, sponsored by the Chicago Tribune.

When the series aired on WGN-TV in Chicago, viewers were not given the solution to the crime. Instead they were told that they could find the solution in the next day's Chicago Tribune, the newspaper that sponsored the program. WGN-TV was owned by the Tribune. During its time on DuMont, the end was included as part of the program.

== Network ==
It was picked up by the DuMont Television Network and first aired on the network September 18, 1949, or September 11, 1949. The 30-minute show aired on Sundays at 8 pm Eastern Time. The show was also known as The Chicagoland Players.

Gordon Urquhart portrayed police officer Jeffrey Hall, who examined each crime scene, questioned witnesses, and interrogated suspects. Bob Smith portrayed Sergeant Holland. The director was Bruno VeSota.

In March 1950 the show's title changed to Chicagoland Players, and the format changed to dramatic presentations that would "cover a wider range of subjects."

DuMont dropped the program on July 23, 1950, and it is unknown if it continued in Chicago for any time.

== Episodes ==
The June 26, 1949, episode was "Adventures of the Curious Cat", written by George Anderson. Other episodes of the series included:

- "The Fangs of Death"
- "Kiss of Death"
- "Tryst with a Dummy"

No episodes of the series are known to have survived.

== Critical response ==
Chris Raczkowski, in the book A History of American Crime Fiction, wrote that dramatizations on the program "were presented with as much of an air of realism as possible". Raczkowski added that publishing the solutions to cases in the newspaper "added even more of an air of reality."

== See also ==
- List of programs broadcast by the DuMont Television Network
- List of surviving DuMont Television Network broadcasts
- 1949-50 United States network television schedule
- This Is Music
- The Music Show
- Concert Tonight

== Bibliography ==
- David Weinstein, The Forgotten Network: DuMont and the Birth of American Television (Philadelphia: Temple University Press, 2004) ISBN 1-59213-245-6
