= The Music Show =

The Music Show may refer to:

- The Music Show, a part of the American television series Classical Baby
- The Music Show (American TV program)
- The Music Show (Australia), an Australian radio program
- The Music Show (Ireland), a music event in Dublin
- The Music Show (Scotland), a Scottish television show

== See also ==
- Music show (disambiguation)
