= Westward the Women =

1951 film by William A. Wellman

- Theatrical film poster
- Directed by: William A. Wellman
- Screenplay by: Charles Schnee
- Story by: Frank Capra
- Produced by: Dore Schary
- Starring: Robert Taylor; Denise Darcel; John McIntire
- Cinematography: William C. Mellor
- Edited by: James E. Newcom
- Music by: Jeff Alexander
- Distributed by: Metro-Goldwyn-Mayer
- Release date: December 31, 1951
- Running time: 118 minutes
- Country: United States
- Language: English
- Budget: $2,203,000
- Box office: $3,996,000

Westward the Women is a 1951 American Western film directed by William A. Wellman and starring Robert Taylor, Denise Darcel and John McIntire.

== Plot ==
In 1851, the working men of Whitman's Valley, California are discontented, as there are no women. Roy Whitman, their employer, tries to prevent his men from leaving by traveling to Chicago to recruit women willing to embark on the arduous journey to California in order to marry. Among the 140 women whom he enlists are middle-aged widow Patience, pregnant and unmarried Rose Meyers and former showgirls Fifi Danon and Laurie Smith. The women select their prospective husbands from an array of daguerreotypes. Roy hires wagon master Buck Wyatt to lead the convoy.

Roy and Buck take the women to St. Joseph, Missouri, where Conestoga wagons and 15 trail hands await them. Kentaro Ito, a Japanese man, persuades Buck to hire him as the cook. Before departing, Buck warns the men and the women to stay away from each other, as he has seen wagon trains torn apart by romantic shenanigans. Four experienced women teach the others how to harness draft animals and drive the wagons, and after a week of training, the group heads westward.

After Buck executes one of the trail hands for raping Laurie, all but two trail hands leave in the middle of the night, along with eight women. While Roy wants to return, they are already halfway to their destination, and Buck believes that they can finish the difficult journey if they train the women to defend themselves. While teaching the women to shoot, Tony Moroni, the young son of Italian widow Mrs. Moroni, is accidentally shot and killed. Distraught, Mrs. Moroni refuses to leave her son's grave. Buck hogties her for fear that she will commit suicide and leaves her with Patience and Rose in their wagon.

Over the coming weeks, the group endures many hardships and losses. An Indian attack kills Roy, Sid and six women. Laurie drowns when a heavy rainstorm causes the collapse of a riverbank, plunging her and Fifi's wagon into the water. Fifi and Buck fall in love. At the edge of the desert, Buck orders the women to leave behind their furniture and fancy clothing to lighten the wagon loads. As many of the women proceed on foot, Rose gives birth to a son.

They stop to rest near a small lake on the border of Whitman's Valley. Not wanting to meet their future spouses in tattered clothing, the women demand that Buck supply them with materials to fashion new dresses, so Buck orders the townsmen to gather fabric. Once properly dressed, the women drive into town. Patience is the first to seek her prospective husband. Mrs. Moroni meets an Italian citrus farmer and Rose and her newborn are greeted warmly by a man who offers to take care of it. While some of the couples dance, others stand in line to be married by the preacher. Ito convinces Fifi to seek out Buck, and they join the marriage line.

== Cast ==
- Robert Taylor as Buck Wyatt
- Denise Darcel as Fifi Danon
- John McIntire as Roy E. Whitman
- Hope Emerson as Patience Hawley
- Julie Bishop as Laurie Smith
- Lenore Lonergan as Maggie O'Malley
- Henry Hiroshi Nakamura as Kentaro Ito
- Marilyn Erskine as Jean Johnson
- Beverly Dennis as Rose Meyers
- Renata Vanni as Mrs. Moroni
- Pat Conway as Sid Cutler (uncredited)
- Guido Martufi as Antonio Moroni (uncredited)
- Claire Carleton as Flashy Woman (uncredited)
- Ted Adams as Bartender (uncredited)

== Production ==
Frank Capra had intended to direct the film and envisioned it as a vehicle for Gary Cooper, but Paramount declined. Capra mentioned the idea to William Wellman, who pitched it to Dore Schary at MGM. Schary approved the project and liked the concept so much that he produced the film himself.

The film was shot at various locations in Kane County, Johnson Canyon, the Gap, Paria and Surprise Valley in Utah. Kane County graded and improved approximately 50 miles of roads through rough and isolated land to permit the film crew to capture places never before seen on film.

MGM sent 175 cast and crew members to film on location, the largest contingent in the studio's history at that time.

== Reception ==
According to MGM records, the film earned $2,640,000 in the U.S. and Canada and $1,356,000 elsewhere, resulting in a profit of $266,000.

== Radio adaptation ==
Westward the Women was presented on Lux Radio Theatre on December 29, 1952. Taylor and Darcel recreated their roles from the film in the one-hour adaptation.

== Legacy ==
In 1985, the Spanish village of Plan, Aragon made headlines when local bachelors organized a caravan of women following a television airing of Westward the Women. There were more than 40 single men and just one single woman in the village, as most of the local women had emigrated. A newspaper advertisement seeking young women wishing to wed resulted in 33 marriages, revitalizing the village. Since then, other Spanish villages have organized similar caravans.
