= Young Man with Ideas =

1952 American film by Mitchell Leisen

- Directed by: Mitchell Leisen
- Written by: Ben Barzman; Arthur Sheekman
- Produced by: Gottfried Reinhardt; William H. Wright
- Starring: Glenn Ford; Ruth Roman; Denise Darcel; Nina Foch
- Cinematography: Joseph Ruttenberg
- Edited by: Fredrick Y. Smith
- Music by: David Rose
- Production company: Metro-Goldwyn-Mayer
- Distributed by: Loew's Inc.
- Release date: May 2, 1952
- Running time: 85 minutes
- Country: United States
- Language: English
- Budget: $1,250,000
- Box office: $848,000

Young Man with Ideas is a 1952 American romantic comedy film directed by Mitchell Leisen and starring Ruth Roman, Glenn Ford and Nina Foch. It was released by Metro-Goldwyn-Mayer. The screenplay concerns a young small-town lawyer, who moves his family from Montana to Los Angeles in the hope of passing the bar in California to ensure that his family can have a more prosperous lifestyle.

== Plot ==
Maxwell Webster is a Montana attorney whose career isn't going as well as wife Julie feels it should be. She gets tipsy at a country club dinner and praises her husband's work in front of colleagues, then urges him to ask boss Edmund Jethrow for a partnership. Instead, he loses his job.

They move to Los Angeles for a fresh start. All they can afford is a modest house where a bookie operation seems to be sharing their telephone line. The kind-hearted Max has only $12 to his name but lends it to a nightclub singer, Dorianne Grey. He shares books with young Joyce Laramie as both study for their California bar exam, which Joyce already has failed twice.

Misunderstandings develop. A gambler named Eddie wrongly believes Max is the bookie who owes him $800. Joyce helps get Max a job with a collection agency, but it turns out to use questionable business tactics. Julie writes home to Montana, trying to get Max's old job back. He is upset by her lack of confidence in him.

Eddie turns up and threatens Max, who slugs him. This leads to mob boss Brick Davis' getting involved and a brawl in Eddie's club, where Dorianne performs. Max is arrested and defends himself in court, over Julie's objections. He wins the case and then Joyce reveals they've both passed the bar. Julie, upset with her own behavior, is delighted to learn that a successful lawyer witnessed Max's work in court and has offered him a job.

== Cast ==
=== Main ===
- Glenn Ford as Max Webster
- Ruth Roman as Julie Webster
- Nina Foch as Joyce Laramie
- Denise Darcel as Dorianne
- Ray Collins as Jethrow
- Sheldon Leonard as Rodwell 'Brick' Davis

=== Supporting ===
- Donna Corcoran as Caroline Webster
- Mary Wickes as Mrs. Jarvis Gilpin
- Bobby Diamond as Willis Gilpin
- Dick Wessel as Eddie Tasling
- Carl Milletaire as Tux Cullery
- Curtis Cooksey as Judge Jennings
- Karl 'Killer' Davis as Punchy (Credited as Karl Davis)
- Fay Roope as Kyle Thornhill
- John Call as Man With Bushy Hair
- Nadine Ashdown as Susan Webster
- Barry Rado as Max, Junior
- Norman Rado as Max, Junior
- Wilton Graff as Mr. Cardy
- Martha Wentworth as Mrs. Hammerty

== Music ==
Denise Darcel sings I Don't Know Why (I Just Do) and Amoure Cherie.

== Reception ==
According to MGM records the film earned $565,000 in the US and Canada and $283,000 elsewhere, resulting in a loss of $754,000.

Bosley Crowther wrote at the time: "this cheerful and unpretentious flurry of straight domestic farce has a lot more to recommend it than you'll find in some of [MGM's] heavier, gaudier films"; the script is "elastic and pleasingly written", its direction is "of a measuredly careless, off-beat sort that clips you with sudden droll surprises", and it is "played with seeming relish by a comparatively second-flight cast that appears to be thoroughly delighted to have something bouncy to do".

According to Turner Classic Movies:

Though Young Man with Ideas is one of Leisen's lesser efforts and represents the beginning of the end of his long career, the film features a good comedic performance by Glenn Ford, some excellent supporting work from Nina Foch, a brisk pace that reveals a light directorial touch, and a reasonable perspective on the trials and tribulations of romance.
