= Twenty Questions (American game show) =

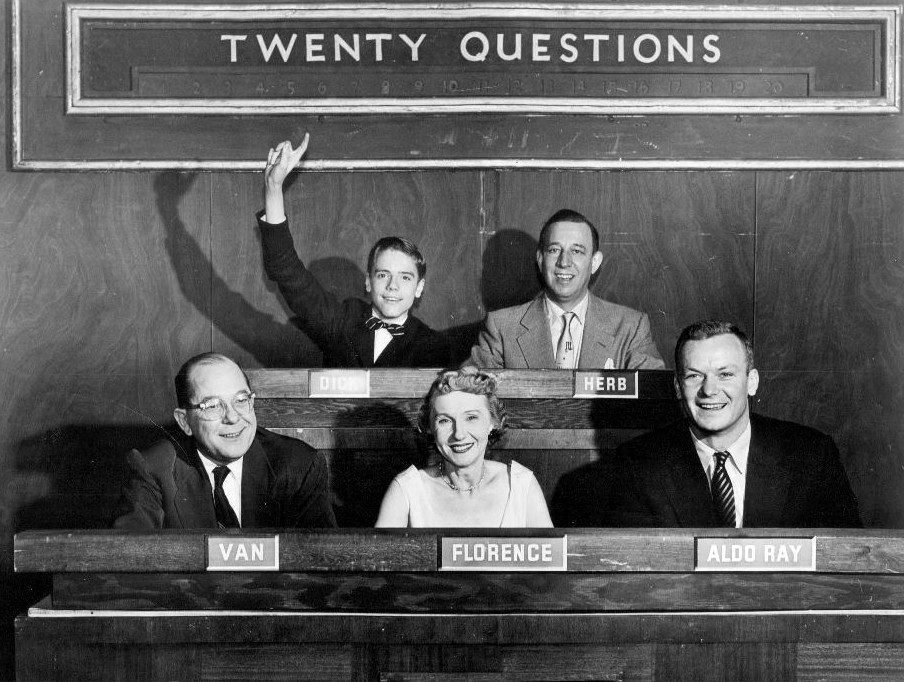
- Photo from DuMont advertising the show, with 14-year-old Dick Harrison, Herb Polesie, Fred Van Deventer, Florence Rinard, and actor Aldo Ray as guest panelist (February 1, 1954)
- Created by: Fred van de Venter (1949-1955); Ron Greenberg by arrangement with Dick Rubin Ltd (1975 pilot)
- Directed by: Roger Bower (1949–1955); Dick Sandwick (1949–1955); Harry Coyle (1949–1955); Bill McCarthy (1949–1955); Arthur Forrest (1975 pilot)
- Presented by: Bill Slater; Jay Jackson; Jack Clark; Dick Wilson
- Announcer: Frank Waldecker; John Gregson; Bob Shepard; Wayne Gossman; Burton Richardson
- Composer: Score Productions (1975 pilot)
- Country of origin: United States
- No. of seasons: 6

Production
- Executive producers: Fred van de Venter (1949–1955); Ron Greenberg (1975 pilot)
- Producers: Norman Livingston (1949–1955); Jack Wyatt (1949–1955); Duane McKinney (1949–1955); George Elber (1949-1955); Gary Stevens (1949–1955)
- Production locations: New Amsterdam Theatre, New York (1949–1955); ABC Television Center, New York (1975 pilot); KTLA Studios, Hollywood (1989 pilot)
- Running time: 25 minutes
- Production companies: Fred van de Venter Productions (1949–1955); Mutual Broadcasting System (1949–1955); Ron Greenberg Productions (1975 pilot); MCA-TV Ltd (1975 pilot)

Original release
- Network: WOR (1949); NBC (1949); ABC (1950–1951, 1954–1955); DuMont (1951–1954)
- Release: November 2, 1949 – May 3, 1955

Related
- 20Q (2009)

Twenty Questions, based on the guessing game Twenty questions, started as a radio quiz show in 1946. The television series ran on NBC in 1949, on ABC from 1950 to 1951 and on the DuMont Television Network from 1951 to 1954. ABC then broadcast it from July 1954 to May 1955.

== Radio show ==
In the 1940s, the game became a popular radio panel quiz show, Twenty Questions, first broadcast at 8 pm, Saturday, February 2, 1946, on the Mutual Broadcasting System from New York's Longacre Theatre on West 48th Street. Radio listeners sent in subjects for the panelists to guess in twenty questions; Winston Churchill's cigar was the subject most frequently submitted. On the early shows, listeners who stumped the panel won a lifetime subscription to Pageant. From 1946 to 1951, the program was sponsored by Ronson lighters. In 1952–1953, Wildroot Cream-Oil was the sponsor.

The show was the creation of Fred Van Deventer (1903–1971), a WOR Radio newscaster with New York's highest-rated news show Van Deventer and the News. Van Deventer was on the program's panel with his wife, Florence Rinard. Their 14-year-old son, Robert Van Deventer (known on the show as Bobby McGuire), and the program's producer, Herb Polesie, completed the regular panel, with daughter Nancy Van Deventer joining the group on occasions. Celebrity guests sometimes questioned.

The Van Deventer family had played the game for years at their home, long before they brought the game to radio, and they were so expert at it that they could often nail the answer after only six or seven questions. On one show, Maguire succeeded in giving the correct answer (the Brooklyn Dodgers) without asking a single question. The studio audience was shown the answer in advance and Maguire based his answer on the audience's reaction; during the 1940s, New York radio studio audiences included many Brooklynites, and they cheered wildly whenever Brooklyn was mentioned in any context.

The initial moderator was sportscaster Bill Slater, who opened each session by giving the clue as animal, vegetable, or mineral. He then answered each query from panel members. This cast remained largely intact throughout the decade-long run of the show. Slater was succeeded at the beginning of 1953 by Jay Jackson, who remained through the final broadcast, and there were two changes in the panel's juvenile chair. When McGuire graduated from high school, his decision to attend the North Carolina–based Duke University meant he could no longer remain on the program, so he asked his high-school friend Johnny McPhee to replace him. Since McPhee was attending Princeton University, near New York. When McPhee graduated he was succeeded by Dick Harrison (real name John Beebe) in September 1953, replaced in early 1954 by 22-year-old Bobby McGuire, appearing as the "oldest living teenager" until the end of the run.

== Television show ==
As a television series, Twenty Questions debuted as a local show in New York on WOR-TV Channel 9 on November 2, 1949. Beginning on November 26, the series went nationwide on NBC until December 24, after which it remained dormant until March 17, 1950, when it was picked up by ABC until June 29, 1951.

Its longest and best-known run, however, is the one on the DuMont Television Network from July 6, 1951, to May 30, 1954. During this time, original host Bill Slater was replaced by Jay Jackson. After this run ended, ABC picked up the series once again from July 6, 1954, to May 3, 1955. The last radio show had been broadcast on March 27, 1954.

In 1975, producer Ron Greenberg made a pilot for a revival on ABC with host Jack Clark, which did not sell. The pilot featured four celebrities: actress Kelly Garrett, movie critic Gene Shalit, comedian Anne Meara, and actor Tony Roberts, along with two contestants who competed against each other.

In 1989, another revival pilot was made for syndication by Buena Vista Television. This version, hosted by Dick Wilson and featuring Markie Post and Fred Willard, also did not sell.

== Recordings of episodes ==
Like many game shows of the era, Twenty Questions was a victim of wiping; most recordings of it were destroyed. Two DuMont episodes from January 18, 1952, and November 16, 1953, as well as the 1975 pilot, circulate among collectors. It is unknown how many radio episodes survive.

== See also ==
- 1950–51 United States network television schedule (ABC, Fridays at 8 p.m. ET)
- 1951–52 United States network television schedule (DuMont, Fridays at 10 p.m. ET)
- 1952–53 United States network television schedule (DuMont, Fridays at 10 p.m. ET)
- 1953–54 United States network television schedule (DuMont, Mondays at 8 p.m. ET)
- 1954–55 United States network television schedule (ABC, Tuesdays at 8:30 p.m.ET)
