= Gamble on Love =

US television program

- Starring: Denise Darcel (July); Ernie Kovacs (August)
- Country of origin: United States
- No. of episodes: 6

Production
- Producer: Rockhill Productions
- Running time: 30 minutes

Original release
- Network: DuMont
- Release: July 16 – August 20, 1954

Gamble on Love is an American game show which ran on the DuMont Television Network from July 16 to August 20, 1954. The series, initially hosted by Denise Darcel, had three opposite-sex couples competing for a prize.

The series aired Friday nights at 10:30 PM Eastern on most DuMont affiliates. Darcel was replaced on August 6 by comedian Ernie Kovacs, who also hosted the show's replacement, Time Will Tell, which started August 27.

== Format ==
Gamble on Love featured "contestants who are married or about to be married" with members of the audience participating. Couples had to answer questions that included "In an early American love story one person was named Priscilla and another John Alden. What was the name of the third?" Correct answers won merchandise, with the prize determined by spinning a "wheel of fortune".

== Episode status ==
DuMont, like CBS and NBC during the 1950s, likely kept at least one or two "example" episodes of each of their main game shows, though DuMont's exact policy is not known. However, DuMont's archive was destroyed after the network ceased broadcasting in 1956. Although a small number of episodes of DuMont game shows have surfaced (including episodes of Okay, Mother, On Your Way, Blind Date, etc.), none are known to exist of either Gamble on Love nor Time Will Tell.

== Production ==
Robert K. Adams was the producer, and Harry Coyle was the director. The production cost was $4,674 per episode. Gamble on Love originated from WABD in New York. It replaced Colonel Humphrey Flack.

== Critical response ==
A review of the premiere episode in The New York Times said, "It was an awkward half hour ...". The review indicated that Darcel ("a glamour girl with a French accent") was not well suited to talking with married couples about how they fell in love.

The trade publication Broadcasting said in a review that Darcel "lacks the English to engage in spontaneous give-and-take with contestants and is totally at sea in her assignment."

A review in the trade publication Variety called the program "a 30 minute hodgepodge of queries and plugs for the contributing prize donors." It said that the format might have succeeded with a different host, but that Darcel was not suited to her role.

== See also ==
- List of programs broadcast by the DuMont Television Network
- List of surviving DuMont Television Network broadcasts

== Bibliography ==
- David Weinstein, The Forgotten Network: DuMont and the Birth of American Television (Philadelphia: Temple University Press, 2004) ISBN 1-59213-245-6
- Alex McNeil, Total Television, Fourth edition (New York: Penguin Books, 1980) ISBN 0-14-024916-8
- Tim Brooks and Earle Marsh, The Complete Directory to Prime Time Network and Cable TV Shows 1946–Present, Ninth edition (New York: Ballantine Books, 2007) ISBN 978-0-345-49773-4
