= Author Meets the Critics =

- Genre: Talk show
- Created by: Phyllis Adams Jenkins
- Presented by: John McCaffery; Faye Emerson; Virgilia Peterson
- Country of origin: United States
- Original language: English

Production
- Producer: Martin Stone
- Camera setup: Multi-camera
- Running time: 24–26 minutes

Original release
- Network: NBC (1948, 1951); ABC (1949); DuMont (1952-1954)
- Release: April 4, 1948 – October 10, 1954

Author Meets the Critics is an American radio and television talk show. After beginning on radio, it was also broadcast on television by the National Broadcasting Company, American Broadcasting Company, and then the DuMont Television Network.

== Overview ==
On the series, two literary critics debated a recently published book, one in favor and the other against. Later, the author of the book appeared to meet the critics. Columnist Jack Gaver outlined the concept in his column "Up and Down Broadway", in 1946: "The author of a current best-seller is tossed in with a couple of guest critics and a commentator and, if he survives 30 minutes of unscripted pro and con, may decide never to write another book. Sometimes the boys get rough and lucky is the writer who draws a couple of critics of such opposed views that they go after each other instead of him."

John K. M. McCaffery was the television moderator from 1948 to 1951 (continuing his radio role). Faye Emerson had a brief stint as moderator during 1952. Then Virgilia Peterson was the moderator during its DuMont run from 1952 to 1954.

The DuMont episodes of the series were produced by Phyllis Adams Jenkins (1923-2004), a pioneer in providing serious programming intended for daytime television audiences. She later produced other series, including What's the Problem?, the daytime series Home featuring Arlene Francis during the 1950s, and Dinah Shore's daytime series during the 1960s.

On his series, Ernie Kovacs parodied it as "Author Heats the Critics", with the author attacking the critics, rather than the other way around.

== Broadcast history ==
Martin Stone first proposed producing the program in 1940, but radio executives found the concept "too highbrow"; the program was first conceived by Stone and "Albany newspaper man" Richard Lewis. It first made air in December 1940, on an Albany station, before moving to Schenectady, and then to New York City. (It was on the AM radio station WHN in New York City, by 1942.) Stone produced the program remotely during much of this era, as he was serving as general counsel for the Lend-Lease Administration and in the United States Navy, during World War II.

After six years on local radio stations, the national radio broadcaster Mutual network began airing the program. It carried the series on radio from June 12, 1946 to April 2, 1947. It was sponsored by the Book-of-the-Month club, on Mutual. In summer 1946, Stone left Mutual "under agreement", airing the show on WQXR on Thursdays with the club sponsorship, and on Mutual without sponsorship. On May 20, Mutual filled his old time slot with Books on Trial, a series sponsored by the Literary Guild, featuring a "prosecuting attorney and jury." Stone took the situation to court, alleging appropriation and effort to confuse. Stone lost in court, as State Supreme Court Justice Bernard Botein found no conflict of ideas. NBC debuted the series as a weekly radio program, on Sundays, beginning June 1, 1947. By that point, "almost 1,000 of the world's top-flight authors and other literary figures" had appeared on the program. In one episode before NBC, author Gontran de Poncins walked out on a debate about Kabloona.

The television series began as a mid-season replacement on NBC on April 4, 1948. General Foods Corporation ended its sponsorship in July 1949. It was transferred to ABC during 1949. The show was transferred back to NBC during 1951, and then to DuMont from January 10, 1952, to October 10, 1954.

== See also ==
- List of programs broadcast by the DuMont Television Network
- List of surviving DuMont Television Network broadcasts

== Bibliography ==
- David Weinstein, The Forgotten Network: DuMont and the Birth of American Television (Philadelphia: Temple University Press, 2004) ISBN 1-59213-245-6
- Alex McNeil, Total Television, Fourth edition (New York: Penguin Books, 1980) ISBN 0-14-024916-8
