= Opera Cameos =

- Genre: Music
- Starring: Giovanni Martinelli
- Country of origin: United States
- Original language: English

Production
- Running time: 30 minutes

Original release
- Network: DuMont
- Release: November 8, 1953 – January 9, 1955

Opera Cameos is a TV series that aired on the DuMont Television Network from November 8, 1953, to January 9, 1955.

== Overview ==
The program aired Sundays at 7:30pm ET, and was hosted by opera singer Giovanni Martinelli. A conductor on the program was Salvatore Dell'Isola. It presented excerpts from operas in their original languages. The program was broadcast locally in New York City before it was picked up by DuMont.

== Episodes status ==
The Paley Center for Media has eight episodes, with the remaining episodes presumed lost.

== See also ==
- List of programs broadcast by the DuMont Television Network
- List of surviving DuMont Television Network broadcasts
- 1954-55 United States network television schedule

== Bibliography ==
- Barnes, Scott "Vintage Portraits", Opera News, November, 2007. Accessed via subscription 27 October 2008.
- Tim Brooks and Earle Marsh, The Complete Directory to Prime Time Network TV Shows, Third edition (New York: Ballantine Books, 1964) ISBN 0-345-31864-1
- Alex McNeil, Total Television, fourth edition (New York: Penguin Books, 1980) ISBN 0-14-024916-8
- David Weinstein, The Forgotten Network: DuMont and the Birth of American Television (Philadelphia: Temple University Press, 2004) ISBN 1-59213-245-6
