= Music show =

Music show may refer to:

- Music Show (foaled 2007), Irish-British racehorse
- Concert, a live performance of music in front of an audience
- Music competition
- Music radio program by a DJ
- DJ's show on music television

== See also ==
- The Music Show (disambiguation)
- Musical theatre, a form of theatrical performance that combines songs, spoken dialogue, acting and dance
- Opera, a form of Western theatre in which music is a fundamental component and dramatic roles are taken by singers
