= John McCaffery =

American television host

John McCaffery (November 30, 1913–October 3, 1983), also known as John K. M. McCaffery, was an American television host who appeared on many game shows and talk shows during the 1940s and 1950s including Americana, Television Screen Magazine, What's the Story, One Minute Please, and Author Meets the Critics.

McCaffery was best known as anchorman of what was called The Eleventh Hour News.

== Early years ==
McCaffery was a native of Moscow, Idaho, who grew up in Madison, Wisconsin. He was a graduate of the University of Wisconsin and Columbia University, with a master's degree from the latter institution. He had two sisters.

== Career ==
McCaffery taught English at City College of New York, Pratt Institute, and St. Joseph's College for Women before he became a public relations practitioner. He worked in advertising for Doubleday, Doran and Company publishers, after which he became an editor for Crowell-Collier Publishing Company. After that, he was a fiction editor for The American Magazine and an editor for Metro-Goldwyn-Mayer. He was a columnist for Publishers Weekly and edited several books.

=== Broadcasting ===
McCaffery was the host of Author Meets the Critics on NBC television. He was host of Room 416, a 15-minute weekday morning program on WNBC radio in 1947.

McCaffery also hosted the following game shows:

- We Take Your Word (CBS Radio - January 29 to April, 1950; CBS primetime - March 9 to June 1, 1951; replaced by John Daly during the rest of the run)
- Information Please (CBS primetime - August 24 to September 21, 1952; replaced Clifton Fadiman)
- Take a Guess (CBS primetime - June 11 to September 10, 1953)
- What's the Story (DuMont primetime - Fall 1953 to September 23, 1955)
- One Minute Please (DuMont primetime - July 6 to November 12, 1954; replaced by Allyn Edwards)
- His last series was Alumni Fun, a primetime game which he hosted from January 20 to April 28, 1963 on ABC.

== Personal life and death ==
McCaffery and his wife, Dorothy, had four sons. He died on October 3, 1983, in Charlotte Hungerford Hospital in Torrington, Connecticut, at the age of 69.
