= They Stand Accused =

American TV court series (1949–1954)

- Also known as: Cross Question
- Genre: Dramatized court show
- Starring: Charles Johnston
- Narrated by: Harry Creighton
- Country of origin: United States
- Original language: English

Production
- Camera setup: Single-camera
- Running time: 48 minutes

Original release
- Network: DuMont
- Release: September 11, 1949 – December 30, 1954

They Stand Accused is an American dramatized court show, the first live courtroom drama on television.

The program began as Cross Question on CBS in January 1949, ending in April 1949. The show was "Chicago's first regular contribution to the CBS television network". The program originated from WGN-TV, and CBS dropped it when that station became an affiliate of the DuMont Television Network. It was broadcast on DuMont from September 11, 1949, to October 5, 1952, and again from September 9 to December 30, 1954.

== Overview ==
The series was recorded in a courtroom presided over by attorney Charles Johnston and broadcast live from Chicago's WGN-TV, with jurors chosen from the studio audience. On most DuMont affiliates, They Stand Accused aired Sundays at 9pm ET during the 1949-1950 television season, then Sundays at 10pm ET, and then Thursdays at 8pm ET during 1954.

Sheldon Cooper, Lloyd Ellingwood were the directors. William C. Wines, assistant attorney general of Illinois, wrote the program's dramatizations.

== Critical response ==
Reviewer Jack Gould wrote in The New York Times that They Stand Accused was "one of the more remarkable and consistently absorbing programs on television". He complimented the program's combination of documentary and dramatic styles and its way of having a natural appearance despite its "careful preparation".

A review in the trade publication Billboard said that episodes would be more interesting if the dramatizations had "a little less naturalism and a little more ingenuity and drama". It said that in the episode reviewed (from September 9, 1951) "the material was unusually dramatic" but that drama was undermined by "some inferior lawyers, inimaginative camera work, and dull writing".

== Episode status ==
At least two episodes exist: the December 23, 1950, episode is held in the J. Fred MacDonald collection at the Library of Congress, while an episode from late 1954 ("The Johnny Roberts Story") can be viewed online at the Internet Archive.

== See also ==
- List of programs broadcast by the DuMont Television Network
- List of surviving DuMont Television Network broadcasts
- 1949-50 United States network television schedule
- 1950-51 United States network television schedule
- 1951-52 United States network television schedule
- 1954-55 United States network television schedule

== Bibliography ==
- David Weinstein, The Forgotten Network: DuMont and the Birth of American Television (Philadelphia: Temple University Press, 2004) ISBN 1-59213-245-6
- Tim Brooks and Earle Marsh, The Complete Directory to Prime Time Network TV Shows, Third edition (New York: Ballantine Books, 1964) ISBN 0-345-31864-1
