= Key to the Ages =

- Presented by: Dr. Theodore Low
- Country of origin: United States

Production
- Running time: 30 minutes

Original release
- Network: ABC
- Release: February 27 – May 22, 1955

Key to the Ages is the name of a half-hour American television series that was broadcast on ABC between February and May 1955 on Sunday nights at 8:00 p.m.

Hosted by Dr. Theodore Low, the program aired from February 27 to May 22, 1955. This literary series originated from ABC affiliate WAAM-TV (now WJZ-TV) in Baltimore and was produced in co-operation with Baltimore's Walters Art Gallery and the Enoch Pratt Free Library. It explored the relationship between great art and great books.

The series should not be confused with the similarly titled Key to the Missing, a documentary series which aired on DuMont from 1948-1949.

None of the episodes are known to still exist.

== See also ==
- List of programs previously broadcast by the American Broadcasting Company

== Bibliography ==
- Tim Brooks and Earle Marsh, The Complete Directory to Prime Time Network and Cable TV Shows 1946–Present, Ninth edition (New York: Ballantine Books, 2007) ISBN 978-0-345-49773-4
