= The Stranger (1954 TV series) =

American TV crime drama series (1954–1955)

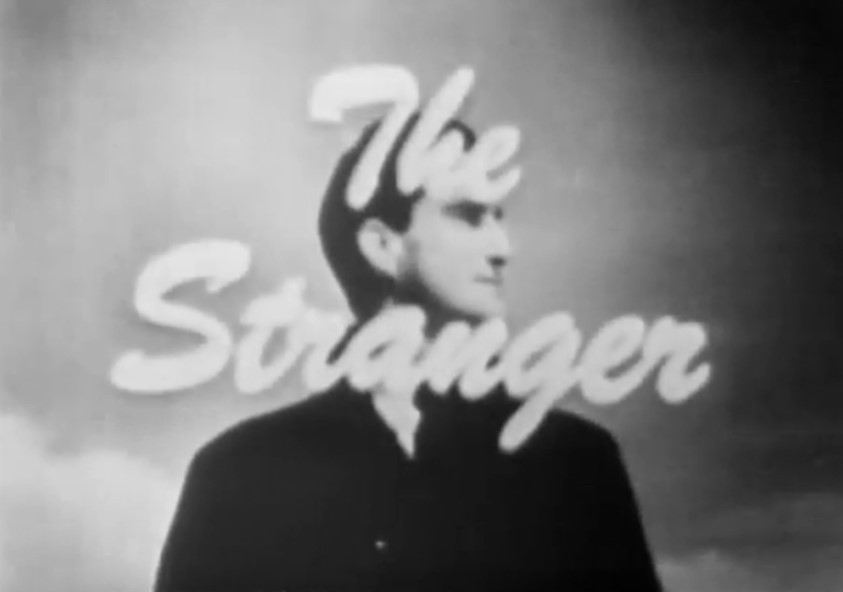
- Created by: Frank Telford
- Starring: Robert Carroll
- Country of origin: United States

Production
- Running time: 30 minutes

Original release
- Network: DuMont
- Release: June 25, 1954 – February 11, 1955

The Stranger is an American television crime drama broadcast on the DuMont Television Network from June 25, 1954, to February 11, 1955.

Robert Carroll played a mysterious man who helped those in distress. The stranger mysteriously appeared when people needed help and disappeared just as mysteriously after each problem was resolved, never taking any pay for his assistance. Some episodes relied more on video than on words, with the stranger "often having scarcely a mouthful of dialogue."

The 30-minute program aired Fridays at 9 PM. The series was produced and directed by Frank Telford, with Nelson Gidding and Carey Wilbur as writers. Most of the program's content was live, with film used for outdoor action. Carroll did his own stunts. Pharmaceuticals Inc. was the sponsor.

Geritol, which sponsored The Stranger, cancelled it because only 23 DuMont affiliates carried the series. Geritol executives wanted to expand coverage by buying time on stations affiliated with CBS and NBC and providing kinescope recordings of episodes for those stations to show. When DuMont officials rejected that proposal, cancellation resulted.

== Criticism ==
The Stranger was hampered by a small budget, even by 1950s standards. Later critics, such as Castleman and Podrazik (1982), cited The Stranger, among other DuMont series, as one of the reasons fewer and fewer viewers tuned into the ailing DuMont Network.

They stated the series was, like several other DuMont programs during the 1953-1954 season, "doomed from the start by third-rate scripts and cheap production" and called the program a "stale pulp adventure". The series did not last long, and the network itself began crumbling by early 1955.

== Episode status ==
Two episodes from 1954 exist at UCLA: The Build Up from September 24 and The Biter Bit from November 12.

== See also ==
- List of programs broadcast by the DuMont Television Network
- List of surviving DuMont Television Network broadcasts
- 1954-55 United States network television schedule

== Bibliography ==
- David Weinstein, The Forgotten Network: DuMont and the Birth of American Television (Philadelphia: Temple University Press, 2004) ISBN 1-59213-245-6
