= Henri Noël =

French footballer (1937–2020)

Personal information
- Date of birth: 11 September 1937
- Place of birth: Mollégès, France
- Date of death: 17 October 2020 (aged 83)
- Position: Defender

Senior career*
Years	Team	Apps	(Gls)
1954–1959	Nîmes B		
1959–1964	Nîmes		
1964–1965	SSMC Miramas		
1965–1969	Avignon		

Managerial career
- 1969–1978: Nîmes B
- 1978–1982: Nîmes
- 1982–1984: Martigues
- * Club domestic league appearances and goals

Henri Noël (11 September 1937 – 17 October 2020) was a French football player and coach.

== Career ==
Born in Mollégès, Noël played as a defender for Nîmes B, Nîmes, SSMC Miramas and Avignon.

He later became a coach, managing Nîmes B, Nîmes and Martigues.

He died of a heart attack on 17 October 2020, aged 83.

In June 2021 a stadium in Nîmes was named after him.
