= The Best of Broadway =

- Created by: Martin Manulis
- Directed by: David Alexander; Sidney Lumet; Paul Nickell; Franklin J. Schaffner; Herbert B. Swope Jr.
- Country of origin: United States
- No. of seasons: 1
- No. of episodes: 9

Production
- Producers: Martin Manulis; Felix Jackson
- Running time: 60 mins

Original release
- Network: CBS
- Release: September 15, 1954 – May 4, 1955

The Best of Broadway is a 60-minute live television anthology series that aired on CBS Television on Wednesdays at 10 p.m. Eastern Standard Time from September 15, 1954, to May 4, 1955, for a total of nine episodes. Each show was broadcast live in color from New York City, was an adaptation of a famous Broadway play, and included commercials for Westinghouse featuring Betty Furness. Using a "giant new studio," plays were presented in front of a studio audience, which contributed a Broadway-like element.

== Production ==
This series ran every fourth week, with Pabst Blue Ribbon Bouts being aired the other three weeks.

The series originated from CBS Television Studio 72 at WCBS-TV. Martin Manulis was the initial producer, and Paul Nickell was the director. David Brookman was in charge of the music. In February 1955, Felix Jackson became the producer when Manulis began producing Climax!.

== Episodes ==
	Play	Author(s)	Broadcast Date	Stars
1	The Royal Family	George S. Kaufman, Edna Ferber	September 15, 1954	Charles Coburn, Claudette Colbert, Helen Hayes, Fredric March, Nancy Olson
2	The Man Who Came to Dinner	George S. Kaufman, Moss Hart	October 13, 1954	Joan Bennett, Margaret Hamilton, Buster Keaton, Bert Lahr, Merle Oberon, ZaSu Pitts, Monty Woolley
3	Panama Hattie	Cole Porter, Herbert Fields, B. G. DeSylva	November 10, 1954	Art Carney, Ethel Merman
4	The Philadelphia Story	Philip Barry	December 8, 1954	Mary Astor, Herbert Marshall, Dorothy McGuire
5	Arsenic and Old Lace	Joseph Kesselring	January 5, 1955	Billie Burke, Helen Hayes, Edward Everett Horton, Boris Karloff, Peter Lorre
6	The Show-Off	George Kelly	February 2, 1955	Carleton Carpenter, Jackie Gleason, Thelma Ritter, Cathy O'Donnell, Alice Ghostley, Russell Collins
7	The Guardsman	Ferenc Molnár	March 2, 1955	Claudette Colbert, Margaret Hamilton, Franchot Tone
8	Stage Door	George S. Kaufman, Edna Ferber (adapted by Gore Vidal)	April 6, 1955	Rhonda Fleming, Elsa Lanchester, Diana Lynn, Victor Moore
9	Broadway	George Abbott, Philip Dunning	May 4, 1955	Joseph Cotten, Piper Laurie, Gene Nelson, Akim Tamiroff, Keenan Wynn

== Critical response ==
A review of "The Show-Off" in the trade publication Variety said that the episode was "pretty feeble stuff" but that Gleason's performance kept it from being "a trying experience, indeed."

== See also ==
- 1954-55 United States network television schedule
