= The Ilona Massey Show =

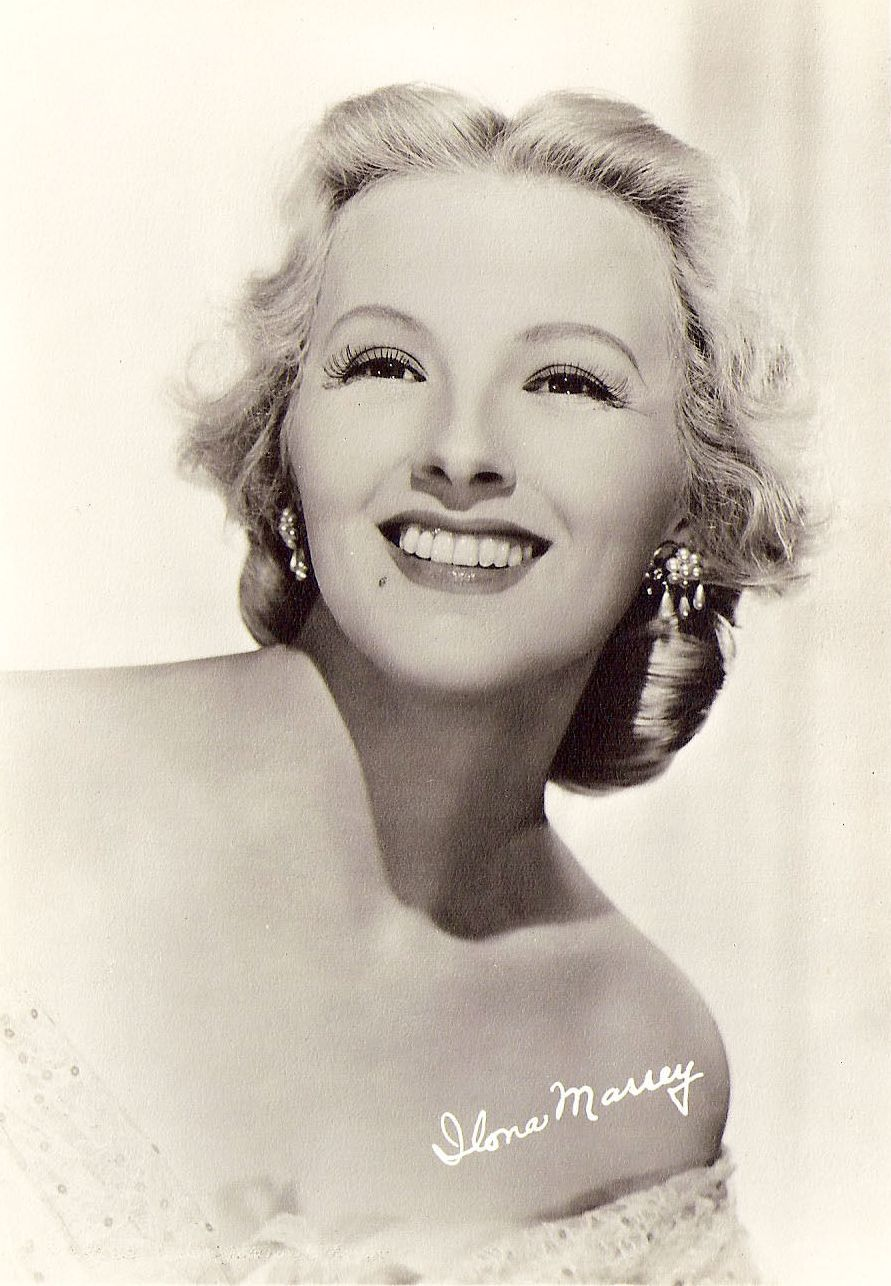
- Ilona Massey
- Genre: Variety show
- Starring: Ilona Massey; Irving Fields
- Country of origin: United States
- Original language: English
- No. of seasons: 1
- No. of episodes: 10

Production
- Running time: 30 minutes

Original release
- Network: DuMont
- Release: November 1, 1954 – January 3, 1955

The Ilona Massey Show is a DuMont Television Network variety show hosted by actress Ilona Massey and featuring musician Irving Fields. Massey sang on a set built to resemble a nightclub. The show aired Mondays from November 1, 1954, to January 3, 1955, for a total of ten episodes.

The show initially was broadcast on Mondays from 8 to 8:30 p.m. Eastern Time. In January 1955 it was moved to Wednesdays from 8:30 to 9 p.m. E. T.

George Paley was the show's first producer and writer; he was replaced by Sherry Cloth in December 1954. Pat Fay was the director.

== Episode status ==
As with many DuMont series, no episodes are known to exist.

== Critical response ==
A review of the premiere episode in the trade publication Variety said that the show "would be palatable for 15-minute dosages" but that in the existing half-hour format it was "stretched to the point of monotony".

== See also ==
- List of programs broadcast by the DuMont Television Network
- List of surviving DuMont Television Network broadcasts
- 1954-55 United States network television schedule

== Bibliography ==
- David Weinstein, The Forgotten Network: DuMont and the Birth of American Television (Philadelphia: Temple University Press, 2004) ISBN 1-59213-245-6
