= Meet Mr. McNutley =

American television series

Meet Mr. McNutley is a TV series starring Ray Milland that ran from 1953 to 1955 on CBS. It was also adapted into a radio serial only running from 1953 to 1954.

The series was also known by the title, The Ray Milland Show.

== Premise ==
Mr. McNutley is an English professor at an all-girls college: Lynnhaven. There, all of his students love him except for the Dean. Luckily, he has an understanding of his wife, Peggy. Later on in the series, he becomes a drama teacher at a co-ed college and his last name is changed to "McNulty."

== Cast ==
- Ray Milland as Professor Ray McNutley
- Phyllis Avery as Peggy McNutley
- Gordon Jones as Pete Thompson
- Minerva Urecal as Dean Josephine Bradley
- Lloyd Corrigan as Dean Dodsworth
- Jacqueline deWit as Ruth Thompson
