= One Minute Please =

American TV quiz show (1954–1955)

- Genre: Panel show
- Created by: Ian Messiter - based on his BBC Radio show of the same name which ran from 1951-52 and 1957
- Starring: John K. M. McCaffery (host); Cleveland Amory; Hermione Gingold; Alice Pearce; Ernie Kovacs; Marc Connelly
- Country of origin: United Kingdom
- Original language: English

Production
- Running time: 30 minutes

Original release
- Network: DuMont
- Release: 6 July 1954 – 17 February 1955

One Minute Please is a panel quiz show which aired at various times on the DuMont Television Network from 6 July 1954 to 17 February 1955. It was adapted for DuMont from the BBC radio series of the same name.

Panelists were given a topic and had to talk about the subject for one minute nonstop. The panelist who talked the most was the winner.

The program received favorable reviews, but DuMont ended it after 33 episodes because it had no sponsors. The trade publication Variety reported that prospective sponsors declined to take the show on because not enough stations in major markets carried it.

John K. M. McCaffery was the initial host. He was succeeded by Allyn Edwards, effective November 19, 1954.

The program initially was seen on Tuesdays from 8:30 to 9 p.m. Eastern Time. In October 1954 it was moved up 30 minutes, from 8 to 8:30 p.m. E. T. on Tuesdays. In November 1954 it was moved to Fridays from 9:30 to 10 p.m. E. T.. Its final slot was on Thursdays from 9:30 to 10 p.m. E. T. beginning in January 1955.

== See also ==
- List of programs broadcast by the DuMont Television Network
- List of surviving DuMont Television Network broadcasts
- 1954-55 United States network television schedule

== Bibliography ==
- David Weinstein, The Forgotten Network: DuMont and the Birth of American Television (Philadelphia: Temple University Press, 2004) ISBN 1-59213-245-6
