= The Jo Stafford Show (1961 TV series) =

1961 British TV variety series

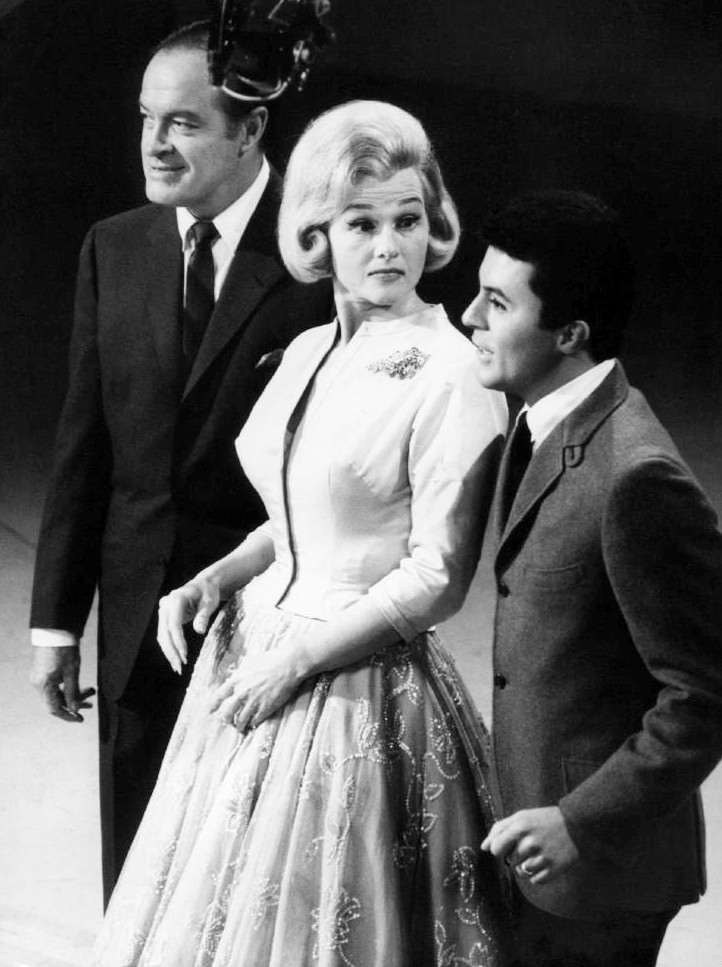
- Stafford with Bob Hope and James Darren.
- Genre: Variety
- Starring: Jo Stafford
- Country of origin: United Kingdom
- Original language: English
- No. of seasons: 1
- No. of episodes: 9

Production
- Running time: 60 minutes
- Production company: ATV

Original release
- Network: ITV
- Release: 9 September 1961

Related
- The Jo Stafford Show (1954)

The Jo Stafford Show is a nine-episode British television programme which aired in the United Kingdom on a fortnightly basis starting 9 September 1961. It was presented by the American singer Jo Stafford, who was joined on stage by guests from the world of music and television; each episode was based on a particular theme. The show was broadcast in the United Kingdom, and was also aired internationally.

== Overview ==
The Jo Stafford Show was produced as a series of one-hour specials. Stafford and her husband, Paul Weston, spent the summer of 1961 in London in order to record the show, and the series was produced by ATV at the ATV Elstree Studios in Hertfordshire. The programme featured Stafford and guests from the world of music and television in both the United Kingdom and United States, with each episode having a different theme, such as love or travel. The first episode featured the singer Ella Fitzgerald and the actress Claire Bloom in a show whose theme was love. Stafford and Fitzgerald performed a musical medley while Bloom recited poetry. This edition also featured a sketch with Kathleen Harrison and George Benson. The travel edition featured Kenneth More and the vintage motor car from the film Genevieve.

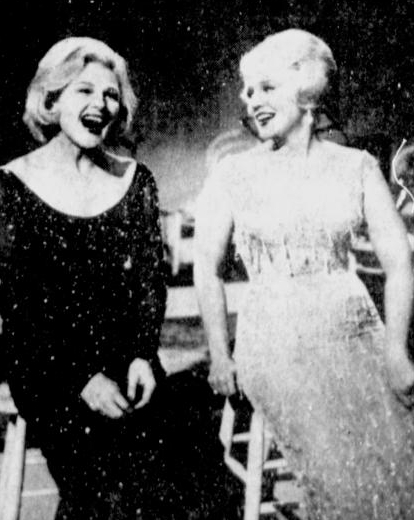
Jo Stafford and Peggy Lee (right).

The website Television Heaven cites a different edition as the series' opening episode, this one centered on the theme of the differences between British and American English. Guests included Graham Stark and Peter Sellers. At Stafford's personal request she was accompanied on stage for the series by the British vocal group, The Polka Dots.

Although the series was produced in the United Kingdom, it was intended for international distribution. The website Cherished Television has called The Jo Stafford Show "the first truly international television musical series". Television Heaven says the show was "billed as the most ambitious series ever launched by a British television production company".

== Episode list ==
The Classic TV Archive mentions an edition of The Jo Stafford Show recorded in London in 1959, suggesting it may have been a pilot for the later series. It is also unclear whether the episode was aired as part of the series when it aired in the United States. A list of episodes is shown below. Note that not all airdates are available.

No.	Title	Original release date
0	"The Swing Era"	11 July 1959
Peggy Lee and song-and-dance man Roy Castle are featured in a toast to swing music of the Thirties and Forties. Songs featured in this edition include "I'll Never Smile Again," "Marie," "Juke Box Saturday Night," and "I'm Not the Guy".
1	"The Language of Language"	9 September 1961
Peter Sellers and Graham Starke detail mishaps brought on by a simple misunderstanding. Jo sings "A Foggy Day," "Isn't It a Lovely Day?" "Thingamajig." Polka Dots, Jack Parnell orchestra
2	"Transportation"	23 September 1961
Actor Kenneth More and song-and-dance man Roy Castle sing and swing on the issue of transportation. Musical selections include: Breezing Along with the Breeze," "Travel On" "Genevieve,"and "Skylark". Featuring The Polka Dots, and the Lionel Blair dancers.
3	"The Language of Love"	7 October 1961
Ella Fitzgerald and Claire Bloom, in a salute to love in song, dance and poetry. Jo and Ella team for "Hooray for Love." Ella sings "Man That Got Away" and "Right to Sing the Blues."
4	"The Great All Star Show"	4 November 1961
Robert Morley and Stanley Holloway take Jo to London's Palladium for a vaudeville show. Songs include "Sam Small," "Small Talk" and "History of the Palladium." Featuring The Polka Dots, the Lionel Blair dancers and Jack Parnell and His orchestra.
5	"The Great All Star Show"	2 December 1961
Jo is joined by a host of guests, including Bob Hope, James Darren, The Polka Dots, Joyce and Lionel Blair, The Lionel Blair Dancers and Jack Parnell and his Orchestra
6	"Ring Out the Bells"	24 December 1961
A Christmas show features Jo's two children, the Westminster Abbey Choir, the George Mitchell Singers, the Corona Stage School Children's Chorus, the Lionel Blair Dancers and comic Harry Secombe.
7	"The Age of Chivalry"	Unknown
Jo Stafford and Actor Peter Lawford recreate "The Age of Chivalry" as they tour Warwick Castle. Joining them on this costumed jaunt are comedians Benny Hill and Kenneth Connor, the Polka Dots, the Lionel Blair Dancers and Jack Parnell and his Orchestra.
8	"The Four Seasons"	Unknown
Jo and guests celebrate the four seasons. Rosemary Clooney performs "Singin' in the Rain", Mel Tormé sings "Winter Wonderland" and Edd Byrnes sings "Falling Leaves". Jo sings "Good Ole Summertime" and "Lovely Day Today." Filmed in England.
