= Tim Brooks (historian) =

American historian, author and retired television executive

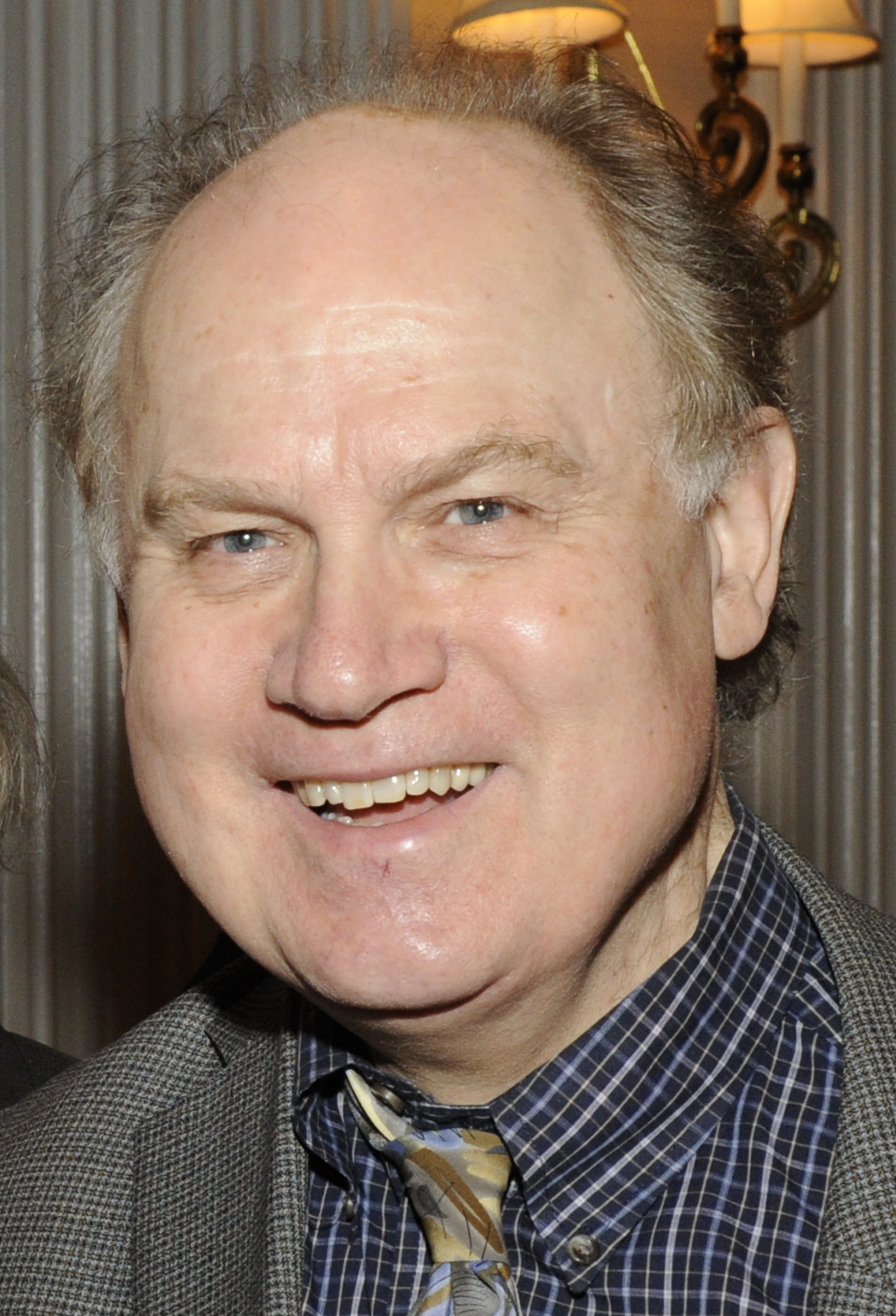
- Born: April 18, 1942 (age 84)
- Education: Dartmouth College 1964, Syracuse University 1969
- Occupations: Business executive, historian, writer
- Writing career
- Language: English
- Genre: History
- Subjects: Television, radio, recording industry
- Notable work: The Complete Directory to Prime Time Network and Cable TV Shows
- Website: www.timbrooks.net

Tim Brooks (born April 18, 1942) is an American television and radio historian, author and retired television executive. He is credited with having helped launch the Sci Fi Channel in 1992 as well as other USA Network projects and channels.

He also served as a research executive for NBC, the N.W. Ayer advertising agency, and Lifetime Television, and as board chairman of industry organizations the Advertising Research Foundation and the Media Rating Council, among others.

He is the author or co-author of nine books about the history of media in the U.S., including television, radio, and the recording industry. He has also been active in urging reform of copyright laws regarding historical recordings, testifying at U.S. Copyright Office hearings in 2011 and chairing the Historical Recording Coalition for Access and Preservation. He was elected president of the Association for Recorded Sound Collections for an unprecedented three terms (serving 1982–84, 2012–14 and 2022-24) and has been chair of its Copyright and Fair Use Committee since 2003.

Comments made by Brooks regarding the Sci Fi Channel's name being changed in 2009 to Syfy led network president Dave Howe to publicly distance himself and his network from Brooks' comments.

== Awards ==
- Association for Recorded Sound Collections Award for Excellence for The Blackface Minstrel Show in Mass Media, 2020.
- Lifetime Achievement Award from the Advertising Research Foundation in 2008.
- Grammy Award for Lost Sounds CD, Best Historical Album, 2007. Also nominated for Best Album Notes in 2007 and 2021.
- Society for American Music Irving Lowens Award for Distinguished Scholarship in American Music, for Lost Sounds, 2006.
- ASCAP Deems Taylor Award for Lost Sounds, 2005.
- Association for Recorded Sound Collections Award for Excellence for Lost Sounds, 2005.
- Lifetime Achievement Award from the Association for Recorded Sound Collections in 2004.
- Association for Recorded Sound Collections Award for Excellence for The Columbia Master Book Discography, 2000.

The Complete Directory by Brooks and Marsh won a 1980 U.S. National Book Award in the one-year category General Reference (paperback). (Note: From 1980 to 1983 in National Book Award history there were dual awards for hardcover and paperback books in many categories. Most of the paperback award-winners were reprints but this one was new.)

Brooks was a member of the Peabody Awards Board of Jurors from 2007 to 2013.

== Publications ==
- The Complete Directory to Prime Time Network and Cable TV Shows 1946–Present (1979), by Brooks and Earle Marsh
- The Complete Directory to Prime Time TV Stars (1987).
- The Columbia Master Book Discography, 1901–1934, with Brian Rust (1999).
- Lost Sounds: Blacks and the Birth of the Recording Industry, published in 2004 with a related double-CD by the same name which won a Grammy Award in 2007.
- Survey of Reissues of U.S. Recordings, for the Council on Library and Information Resources and the Library of Congress (2005).
- Little Wonder Records and Bubble Books, with Merle Sprinzen (2011).
- College Radio Days (2013).
- The Blackface Minstrel Show in Mass Media (2020).
