= Denise Darcel =

French-American actress (1924–2011)

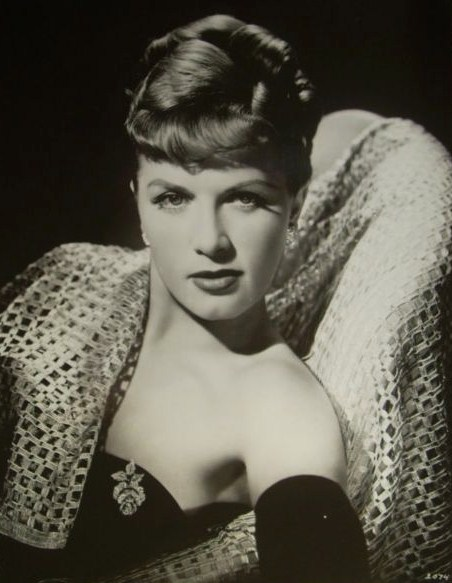
- Darcel in 1949
- Born: Denise Billecard; 8 September 1924; Paris, France
- Died: 23 December 2011 (aged 87); Los Angeles, California, U.S.
- Occupations: Actress; Singer; Vaudevillian
- Years active: 1948–1963
- Spouses: William Shaw (m. 1947; div. 19??); Francis Peter Crosby (m. 1950; div. 1951): Robert Atkinson (m. 1961; div. 19??); Richard Vance (m. 1972; div. 19??); George Simpson Jr. (m. 1990; died 2003)
- Children: 2 sons (Chris and Craig)

Denise Darcel (née Billecard, 8 September 1924 – 23 December 2011) was a French-American vaudevillian, actress and singer, who from 1948 and 1963, appeared in films in Hollywood, and briefly on the stage, television and radio.

== Early years ==
Born as Denise Billecard in Paris, she was one of five daughters of a French baker, and she was college educated, studying at the University of Dijon. According to a friend, whom she met in Paris during World War II, she was a passenger in an L-5 Stinson light observation aircraft on VJ Day to see the celebration from the air. The pilot, James Helinger Sr., a US Army Air Corps glider pilot (a friend) was at the controls, while they flew under several bridges along the Seine and finally, under the Eiffel Tower, with the crowds below.

A winner of the title "The Most Beautiful Girl in France," Darcel was a cabaret singer in Paris after World War II before being spotted by Hollywood. Denise came to the United States in 1947 and became an American citizen in 1952.

On 15 February 1952 she was named "Miss Welder of 1952" by the National Eutectic Welders' Club. Presenting her with a scroll as "the girl we would like most to weld with" was R. D. Wasserman, President of the Eutectic Welding Institute. Wasserman hoped that her photograph would inspire women throughout the nation to join the ranks of the labor force and support the war effort in Korea.

== Stage ==
Darcel's debut on the legitimate stage came in 1950, when she appeared in Pardon Our French, premiering 5 October at the Broadway Theatre.

== Vaudeville ==
In 1950, Darcel had a Vaudeville act, which was panned by at least one reviewer. About Darcel's performance 5 May 1950, at the Strand in New York, the Billboard review said: "Denise Darcel showed her well-stacked chassis ... but her heavily accented English sounded like so much gibberish; it got laughs instead of attention. ... her singing is inadequate, her over-use of hands and arms is clumsy and she shows herself completely at a loss in handling hecklers."

== Film ==
Her first film appearance of note was in Battleground (1949). She made quite an impression in Tarzan and the Slave Girl (1950) opposite Lex Barker, then co-starred with Robert Taylor in Westward the Women (1951) and Glenn Ford in Young Man with Ideas (1952). In 1953, she was seen in the swimming musical Dangerous When Wet, which starred Esther Williams (1953). Her most important film was Vera Cruz (1954) where she played the female lead opposite Gary Cooper and Burt Lancaster. Her last film (1961) was Seven Women from Hell.

== Television ==
Darcel appeared on various TV shows in the 1950s. In 1954, she was hostess/MC of Gamble on Love, a summer program on the DuMont Television Network. Darcel asked questions of married couples who sought to win the grand prize of a mink coat. A review in Billboard described her as "Gallic to the point of unintelligibility." Also in 1954, Colonel Productions produced a pilot of Chez Denise, a 30-minute "comedy-intrigue" program starring Darcel, which apparently did not sell.

== Later years ==
After her film and television career began to wane, Darcel, aged 41, became an ecdysiast (stripper), appearing in West Coast theatres in San Francisco, Las Vegas, Oakland, and Los Angeles. She retired from stripping after a few years and returned to the cabaret circuit, making a few appearances on television. In 1991, she was cast as "Solange La Fitte" in the Los Angeles 20th anniversary revival of the musical Follies, produced by the Long Beach Civic Light Opera. She would later repeat the role of Solange in 1995 for revivals in Houston and Seattle.

== Personal life ==
Darcel's first husband, William Shaw, was an American Army captain whom she married in 1947. Darcel obtained a Mexican divorce from Peter Crosby 12 August 1951. She married Robert Atkinson 24 April 1961. They had two sons, Christopher (born 17 November 1961) and Craig. Husband George Simpson died in 2003.

In the early 1950s, Darcel was linked romantically with singer Billy Eckstine. In 1993, Jet magazine reported, "Eckstine's hot romance with actress Denise Darcel cooled off after their photo appeared on cover of Life Magazine, causing a White backlash."

== Recording ==
Online music store iTunes made Darcel's album, Banned in Boston (recorded in 1958), available for purchase alongside actress Lizabeth Scott's album, Lizabeth.

== Legal problems ==
On 23 June 1968, Darcel was arrested in Miami, Florida, and charged with shoplifting women's undergarments valued at $38.94 ($360 today). She was released on $500 bond. She was found guilty and fined $300 ($2,780 today) in a trial 10 July 1968.

Darcel and her husband, Robert Gerard Atkinson, filed bankruptcy petitions in San Bernardino, California, in 1963. The petitions listed "total assets of $1,508 ($15,860 today) and individual and joint debts of $88,904 for her and $62,223 for him."(total of $1,589,000 today)

== Honors ==
In September 2009, she was honored with the Cinecon Career Achievement Award, presented in Hollywood at a banquet held at the Hollywood Renaissance Hotel. Prior to the ceremony, a new 35mm color print of her 1953 film, Flame of Calcutta, was screened at the Egyptian Theatre. After the screening, at the banquet, she cheerfully announced to the audience, "I'm back".

The world's oldest drag queen, Walter W. Cole took the stage name of Darcelle XV, in honor of Denise Darcel.

In 1968, Denise was name Queen of the Saranac Lake Winter Carnival.

== Death ==
Darcel died in December 2011, aged 87, after emergency surgery to repair a ruptured aneurysm.

== Selected filmography and television appearances ==
- To the Victor (1948) as Bar Singer (uncredited)
- Thunder in the Pines (1948) as Yvette Cheron
- Battleground (1949) as Denise
- Tarzan and the Slave Girl (1950) as Lola
- Westward the Women (1951) as Fifi Danon
- Young Man with Ideas (1952) as Dorianne Gray
- Dangerous When Wet (1953) as Gigi Mignon
- Flame of Calcutta (1953) as Suzanne Roget
- Vera Cruz (1954) as Countess Marie Duvarre
- Gamble on Love (DuMont game show, 1954; replaced by Ernie Kovacs) as Countess Marie Duvarre
- The Milton Berle Show (1956, TV Series)
- Tightrope! (1960, TV Series) as Terri
- Seven Women from Hell (1961) as Claire Oudry
- Naked City (1962, TV Series) as Madeleine Douvay

== Radio appearances ==
Year	Program	Episode/source
1950	Quick as a Flash	NA
1985	Musical Comedy Theater	Going Hollywood
1952	Lux Radio Theatre	Westward the Women
1951	Martin & Lewis Show	NA

== Television appearances ==
Year	Program	Episode/source
1950	This Is Show Business	21 May episode
1951	Don McNeill's Breakfast Club	7 November episode
1954	Droodles	21 June episode
1963	Combat!	19 November 1963 "A Distant Drum"
