= The Soldiers (American TV series) =

American television show

- Genre: Sitcom
- Created by: Hal March; Tom D'Andrea
- Starring: Hal March; Tom D'Andrea; John Dehner; Red Pearson
- Country of origin: United States
- Original language: English
- No. of seasons: 1
- No. of episodes: 11

Production
- Executive producers: Hal March; Tom D'Andrea
- Running time: 30 minutes
- Production company: National Broadcasting Company (1955)

Original release
- Network: National Broadcasting Company
- Release: June 25 – September 3, 1955

The Soldiers is a 1955 NBC 11-episode summer sitcom starring Hal March, Tom D'Andrea, Red Pearson, and John Dehner. The series was sent in mono and black and white. It was directed by Bud Yorkin and written by Hal March and Tom D'Andrea. On television the half-hour series was broadcast on Saturdays from June 25, 1955 to September 3, 1955.

The series featuring the misadventures of two reluctant privates played by March and D'Andrea; John Dehner as the captain, and Red Pearson as the sergeant. Mickey Rooney guest starred in one segment. The Soldiers was Hal March's first starring role in a television series.

March and D'Andrea, who used their first names as series characters, had previously appeared in these same roles on the NBC anthology series, The Colgate Comedy Hour. In one episode a soldier becomes depressed because he cannot see his wife on their anniversary, having sent her a bus ticket to meet him. Without money for the meal, Hal and Tom raise funds for the soldier but wind up in jail doing so.

After the series failed to take root, D'Andrea returned to his role as Jim Gillis on William Bendix's NBC sitcom, The Life of Riley; March became host of CBS's The $64,000 Question.
