= Norby (TV series) =

- Genre: Sitcom
- Created by: David Swift
- Starring: David Wayne
- Country of origin: United States
- Original language: English
- No. of seasons: 1
- No. of episodes: 13

Production
- Producer: David Swift
- Camera setup: Multi-camera
- Running time: 30 minutes

Original release
- Network: NBC
- Release: January 5 – April 6, 1955

Norby is an American sitcom that aired on NBC from January 5 to April 6, 1955. The first television series filmed in color, it was created by David Swift and lasted one season and 13 episodes.

== Premise ==
Pearson Norby is the vice president in charge of small loans at a small-town bank in Pearl River, New York. At the bank, he works with Mr. Rudge, another vice president and efficiency expert, and Wahleen Johnson, the telephone operator. Some sources claim the bank is run by an unnamed president, while others identify Mrs. Maude Endles as its president. Norby lives in Pearl River with his wife Helen, daughter Diane, and son Hank. Bobo and Maureen live next door to the Norbys.

== Cast ==
- David Wayne as Pearson Norby
- Joan Lorring as Helen Norby
- Susan Hallaran as Diane Norby
- Evan Elliott as Hank Norby
- Janice Mars as Wahleen Johnson
- Ralph Dunn as Mr. Rudge
- Carol Veazie as Mrs. Maude Endles
- Jack Warden as Bobo
- Maxine Stuart as Maureen
- Paul Ford as Bank President

== Production ==
Norby was created by writer David Swift. The series was filmed in color, with exterior shots filmed on location in Pearl River, New York. Other filming was done at 20th Century Movietone Studios in New York City, with no laugh track. Eastman Kodak was the sponsor (that company's first venture into TV sponsorship). Kodak also made the film used for the series. The lack of availability of affiliates for the program's time slot "was probably the chief factor behind its early cancellation". Swift was the producer, and he directed some episodes, with Richard Whorf and Rogers Brackett directing others. Writers included George Kirgo, James Lee, Harvey Orkin, David Rayfiel, and Paul West. John Graham and Max Allentuck were associate producers.

== Broadcast history ==
Norby aired at 7:00 p.m. on Wednesdays throughout its 13-episode run. It was replaced by Kodak Request Performance, a film series that included plays from Ford Theatre and from Top Plays of 1955.

== Critical reception ==
Critic Jack Gould, in a review of the first episode of Norby in The New York Times, described the program as being "off to an extremely wobbly start". He wrote that the show made the title character too much like fathers in other TV situation comedies and that situations in the episode strained plausibility. His most positive comments regarded the quality of the episode's color, which he said also resulted in an improved picture on black-and-white TV sets.

A review of the same episode in the trade publication Broadcasting said that the program avoided "much of the nonsense that clutters too many of the series' family contemporaries on TV". If other episodes followed that trend, the review said, "viewers are in for solid, warm entertainment".

== Episodes ==
No.	Title	Directed by	Written by	Original release date
1	"The Promotion"	David Swift	Harvey Orkin, James Lee, David Rayfiel, George Kirgo	January 5, 1955
The pilot episode for the series. Pearson Norby receives a promotion from head teller to vice president in charge of small loans at Pearl River First National Bank in Pearl River, New York.
2	"Overdrawn Account"	Unknown	Unknown	January 12, 1955
Horrified to learn that he has overdrawn his own bank account and harboring doubts about his banking ability, Norby spends a miserable night with an "angel-in-charge-of-hopelessness."
3	"The Picnic"	Unknown	Unknown	January 19, 1955
Norby tries to stop the tree he used to picnic under from being cut down to make room for a motel.
4	"Late Love"	Unknown	Unknown	January 26, 1955
While Diane and Helen wait for Norby, Diane studies the love lives of people at the bank.
5	"Helen's Holiday"	Unknown	Unknown	February 2, 1955
Despite Norby's good mood, Helen begins to feel that life has passed her by.
6	"Wahleen's Romance"	Unknown	Unknown	February 9, 1955
After the women at the bank look enviously at a passing car bearing a "Just Married" sign, Wahleen gets carried away and says that she soon will be married, too.
7	TBA	Unknown	Unknown	February 16, 1955
When Helen dwells on all the golden opportunities she feels she has missed in her life, Norby looks for a way to cure her of her dreams of glory.
8	"The Quiet War"	Unknown	Unknown	February 23, 1955
The Norbys have a minor disagreement that escalates into a color war.
9	TBA	Unknown	Unknown	March 2, 1955
Helen and Maureen sign up for an art appreciation class.
10	"The Cinderella Story"	Unknown	Unknown	March 9, 1955
Norby rewrites the Cinderella story as he thinks it really happened to show that the Prince Charming was framed — in Norby's version, the Prince Charming was a sure prey for the girl in the glass slipper when she set her mind on matrimony.
11	TBA	Unknown	Unknown	March 16, 1955
Diane decides that she wants to be a ballet dancer, and Norby tells her she must earn her own money for ballet lessons.
12	"Dorcus Dilemma"	Unknown	Unknown	March 23, 1955
Too embarrassed to tell anyone that he has lost his gun, Dorcus, the longtime guard at the bank, instead announces his retirement.
13	"Boss and the Lady"	Unknown	Unknown	April 6, 1955
Helen helps out at the bank by filling in as Norby's secretary, and her office behavior convinces Norby that the place for a woman is in the home.
