= The Jane Froman Show =

American musical variety TV series (1952–1955)

- Also known as: USA Canteen; Jane Froman's U.S.A. Canteen
- Genre: Musical variety
- Created by: Irving Mansfield
- Written by: Irving Mansfield; Ervin Drake; Irvin Graham; Jimmy Shirl
- Directed by: Byron Paul
- Starring: Jane Froman
- Theme music composer: Richard Rodgers; Lorenz Hart
- Opening theme: With a Song in My Heart
- Country of origin: United States
- Original language: English
- No. of seasons: 3
- No. of episodes: 173

Production
- Producer: Byron Paul
- Running time: 30 minutes (approx. 25 minutes excluding ads, October–December 1952); 15 minutes (approx. 12 minutes excluding ads, January 1953–1955)

Original release
- Network: CBS
- Release: October 18, 1952 – June 30, 1955

The Jane Froman Show is an American musical variety television series starring singer and actress Jane Froman that aired on CBS from October 18, 1952, to June 23, 1955.

The title USA Canteen was used from the show's premiere on October 18, 1952, until December 30, 1952. When the series became bi-weekly, the name was changed to Jane Froman's U.S.A. Canteen, which remained the title until July 2, 1953. From season two on, it became known as The Jane Froman Show.

== Premise ==
The series starred Jane Froman, a popular singer & actress from the 1930s-1950s, who was famous on radio, TV and Broadway. During World War II she travelled overseas to entertain the United States Armed Forces. She suffered from both initial serious injuries sustained in a 1943 USO plane crash in Portugal, and from the many operations that followed to save her legs from amputation. Appearing on crutches, she was to become an image of bravery and stoicism. A 1952 movie was made about her life entitled With a Song in My Heart.

This 15-minute series was originally titled U.S.A. Canteen tying in with Froman's USO background. Then the name was changed to The Jane Froman Show. It appeared for 3 years. At the beginning of its run, it aired on alternate weeks with The Perry Como Show on NBC, but soon was scheduled bi-weekly on Tuesdays and Thursdays, then weekly on Thursdays. Vocalist John Raitt also appeared on this series.

== Production ==
The series was created by Irving Mansfield and produced and directed by Byron Paul. Writers were Irvin Graham, Jimmy Shirl, Ervin Drake, and Albert Stillman. The choreographer was Peter Birch, and Alfredo Antonini directed the music. The show originated at WCBS-TV. Allyn Edwards was the announcer.

The program was initially 30 minutes long, broadcast on Saturday afternoons. Later it changed to a 15-minute format on Tuesday and Thursday evenings.

== Broadcast history ==
- Saturday at 9:00-9:30 pm on CBS: October 18, 1952 – December 30, 1952
- Tuesday at 7:45-8:00 pm on CBS: January 1, 1953 – January 28, 1954
- Thursday at 7:45-8:00 pm on CBS: January 3, 1953 – June 30, 1955
