= Frankie Laine Time =

American TV variety series (1955–1956)

Frankie Laine Time is a variety show summer replacement television series that replaced Arthur Godfrey and His Friends on CBS. It ran July - September 1955 and August - September 1956.

== Overview ==
The variety series included star Frankie Laine singing songs with other singers, dancers, and comedians. The 1955 version featured The Lynn Duddy Singers, The James Starbuck Dancers, and The Jimmy Carroll Orchestra. Their counterparts in 1956 were The Mellolarks, The Edith Barstow Dancers, and The Russ Case Orchestra. Tony Marvin was the announcer.

Guests on the series included The Treniers, Boris Karloff, Morey Amsterdam Duke Ellington, Ella Fitzgerald and many other celebrities of the era.

Lester Gottlieb produced the 1955 series. Seymour Burns was the director. The writers were Ervin Drake, Jimmy Shirl, David Greggory, and Jay Burton.

The second series began on August 1, 1956, running on Wednesdays from 8 to 9 p.m. Eastern Time. Charlie Andrews was the producer, and Mel Ferber was the director. The writers were Harvey Orkin, Shelly Keller, and Lou Salaman.

Sponsors included Kellogg, Bristol-Myers, Toni Company, Frigidaire, and Pillsbury Mills.

== Related programs ==
Prior to this, Frankie Laine hosted The Frankie Laine Show, a 1954 series which aired in first-run syndication in a half-hour time-slot. A public domain episode of this version appears on the Internet Archive and runs 26 minutes with commercials removed. Unlike most variety series of the era, this show was produced directly on film, in the manner similar to Liberace. Both Liberace and The Frankie Laine Show were productions of Guild Films, also responsible for Life with Elizabeth and several other syndicated series of the 1950s.

The syndicated version was exported to Australia during the late-1950s, where it aired on ABC in Sydney and Melbourne.

A 1950 pilot called The Frankie Laine Show was produced prior to both of these shows, but wasn't picked up.

== Critical response ==
The trade publication Variety called the 1955 series of Frankie Laine Time "a solid variety show". It complimented the regular performers and guest stars and said the premiere episode was "a neatly blended hour of songs, hoofing, and comedy". Commercials drew criticism both for their placement and for having Laine deliver the sales pitch, but the review said that those were "relatively minor flaws in an otherwise Entertaining session".

In contrast, Variety described the 1956 premiere as "an inept job of vaudeo [sic] packaging. Everything was wrong and nothing worked." The review cited flaws for which it blamed off-camera personnel "from the producer down to the writers" because they failed showcase the featured talent properly.

A review of the 1956 premiere in The New York Times described Laine's singing style as "loud but not jagged, jarring but not shattering". The review cited Ellington's piano artistry as a highlight of the show. Production came in for criticism with the comment, "Lots of things happened, but they all appeared to have been fed haphazardly into the cameras."

The trade publication Broadcasting wrote that the show's return in 1956 indicated that it "has possibilities" but not being put on a full-year schedule indicated that it wasn't "ready for the big time". The review complimented Laine's singing but said that the premiere episode showed a lack of "talent for smoothly bridging the gaps between songs". It added that the episode's "contrived gags" diminished the show's overall appeal.
