= So You Want to Lead a Band =

- Genre: Variety show
- Starring: Sammy Kaye
- Country of origin: United States
- Original language: English

Production
- Running time: 30 mins.

Original release
- Network: ABC
- Release: August 5, 1954 – January 27, 1955

So You Want to Lead a Band is a half-hour television variety show hosted by Sammy Kaye. It was also known as The Sammy Kaye Show, The Sammy Kaye Variety Show, Sammy Kaye's Music from Manhattan, and Music from Manhattan.

== Format ==
Members of the studio audience are invited to conduct the band. Then through its applause, the audience chooses the winning amateur conductor. The winner receives a prize. Vocalists on the program included Barbara Benson and Jeffrey Clay.

The series aired on Thursdays at 9pm Eastern Time after Treasury Men in Action and before Kraft Television Theater. The show's competition on NBC was Dragnet.

In 1954, it was replaced by Star Tonight.

== Broadcast schedule ==
Broadcast Schedule
Span on the Air	Network	Day of Week	Time
June - July 1950	NBC	Sunday	8-8:30
July 1951 - July 1952	CBS	Saturday	7-7:30
August - September 1953	NBC	Saturday	8-8:30
August 1954 - January 1955	ABC	Thursday	9-9:30
September 1958 - February 1959	ABC	Saturday	10-10:30
February - April 1959	ABC	Thursday	10-10:30
April - June 1959	ABC	Saturday	10-10:30

Source: The Complete Directory to Prime Time Network and Cable TV Shows 1946-Present
