= Star Tonight =

American TV anthology series (1955–1956)

- Genre: Anthology
- Written by: Ray Bradbury; Roald Dahl; Abby Mann; Rod Serling; Oscar Wilde; Thornton Wilder
- Directed by: Edmund Goulding; Harry Herrmann
- Country of origin: United States
- Original language: English
- No. of seasons: 2
- No. of episodes: 80

Production
- Camera setup: Single-camera
- Running time: 25 minutes

Original release
- Network: ABC
- Release: February 3, 1955 – August 9, 1956

Star Tonight is an American television anthology series, aired on ABC from February 3, 1955, to August 9, 1956. It consisted of 80 total episodes, 30 from 1955 and 50 from 1956. Each episode was a self-contained story, usually adapted from famous plays, short-stories or novels by some of the writers of the day.

== Format ==
Episodes featured "rising young actors and actresses in their first starring roles", and performers with more experience had supporting parts. the pairing of little-know actors with more established professionals was similar to that of Hollywood Screen Test.

Playwrights whose works were presented on Star Tonight included Josefina Niggli.

== Production ==
Harry Herrmann produced the program, which replaced So You Want to Lead a Band. It was sponsored by the Brillo Manufacturing Company and originated from WABC-TV in New York City. The program was broadcast from 9 to 9:30 p.m. Eastern Time on Thursdays. Chester Hadley wrote for the series.

== Episode list, partial ==
- February 3, 1955, "You Need Me"; with Jacqueline Holt, Kevin McCarthy
- February 10, 1955, "The Week-end"; with Darryl Grimes, John Conte, Peg Hillias
- February 17, 1955, "Concerning Death"
- February 24, 1955 "How Beautiful the Shoes"
- March 3, 1955, "Zone of Quiet"
  - March 10, 1955, "Ile"
- ...

== Notable guest stars ==
Theodore Bikel
Leo G. Carroll
Buster Crabbe
Robert Culp
Richard Davalos
Susan Harrison
Signe Hasso
James Holden
Kim Hunter
June Lockhart
Nancy Malone
Kevin McCarthy
Jason Robards
Lois Smith
Rudy Vallee
Jo Van Fleet
Elizabeth Wilson
Joanne Woodward
Efrem Zimbalist Jr

== Critical response ==
A review of the initial episode in the trade publication Variety called the show's concept "one of those laudable ideas" but said that the premiere showed that a good script is needed to make an actor look good. The review said that Holt's "extremely competent performance" was undermined by "a soap-operaish story', so that "the entire effect was wishy-washy".
