= This Is Music (TV program) =

American TV music series (1951–1952)

- Starring: Alexander Gray
- Country of origin: United States

Production
- Producer: WGN-TV
- Running time: 30 minutes

Original release
- Network: DuMont
- Release: November 29, 1951 – October 9, 1952

This Is Music is an American music television series which was broadcast on the DuMont Television Network from November 29, 1951, to October 9, 1952.

== Description and history ==
This Is Music was broadcast live from Chicago, Illinois, and hosted by Alexander Gray. Regulars included Gray, Colin Male, Nancy Carr, Bruce Foote, Lucille Reed, Jackie Van, Jacqueline James and Bill Snary; the series featured the Robert Trendler Orchestra.

The series ran from November 1951 to October 1952. It aired on Thursday nights at 8pm (ET) during most of its run but changed to 10pm during the summer of 1952.

Two episodes of the DuMont series are in the collection of the UCLA Film and Television Archive, and two episodes are in the collection of the Paley Center for Media.

== Unrelated shows with the same or similar name ==
The DuMont show is not to be confused with:

- An ABC Television program that aired in 1958–1959;
- The similarly named syndicated program This Is Your Music (1955); or
- The name used in the United States and Canada, This Is Music, when airing the 1972 British television program Tony Bennett at the Talk of the Town during 1974 and 1976 respectively.

== See also ==
- List of programs broadcast by the DuMont Television Network
- List of surviving DuMont Television Network broadcasts
- 1951-52 United States network television schedule

== Bibliography ==
- David Weinstein, The Forgotten Network: DuMont and the Birth of American Television (Philadelphia: Temple University Press, 2004) ISBN 1-59213-245-6
