= The Complete Directory to Prime Time Network and Cable TV Shows 1946–Present =

Book by Tim Brooks and Earle Marsh

- First edition
- Author: Tim Brooks; Earle Marsh
- Original title: The Complete Directory to Prime Time Network TV Shows 1946–Present
- Language: English
- Subject: Broadcast programming
- Publisher: Ballantine Books
- Publication date: 1979
- Publication place: United States
- Media type: Print
- Pages: 848
- Awards: National Book Award (1980)
- ISBN: 978-0-345-28248-4
- OCLC: 4496779

The Complete Directory to Prime Time Network and Cable TV Shows, 1946–Present is a trade paperback reference work by American television historians Tim Brooks and Earle Marsh, first published by Ballantine Books in 1979.

== History ==
The 1979 book publication was by Tim Brooks at NBC, who was then head of that network's research, and Earle Marsh of CBS, who was a manager there of special research projects, and it was the book's first edition. According to Aaron Barnhart (as told to him by author Tim Brooks), the original volume "almost didn't get printed... because publishers were worried 'that it was too big'" (covering 3,000 shows). Between the sixth and ninth editions, Brooks and Marsh expanded an already "hefty" paperback from 5,000 to 6,500 shows covered ("adding about half an inch to the spine"). According to Barnhart, "no listing has ever been deleted or edited for space in the 30-year history of [T]he Complete Directory".

The title of later editions include the words "and cable". The ninth edition came out in 2007; in it, co-author Tim Brooks said that the ninth edition may be the last one released.

== Awards and recognition ==
The 1979 publication won a 1980 U.S. National Book Award, then known as the "American Book Awards", in the category of General Reference Books—Paperback, as the work was published direct to paperback. (Note: As Barnhart notes, "the National Book Awards were defunded [in 1979] by the consortium of big publishing houses that had sponsored the competition since 1950... too many small, obscure titles were winning for their liking. So the... Association of American Publisher[s] started up a replacement, the American Book Awards. They were called the ABAs until 1987, when a private foundation took over and renamed it the National Book Awards" (see Barnhart 2007). Hence, an original ABA award appears in the listing of the National Book Awards (see NBF 2023). In their awards premier in 1980, the ABAs introduced many new categories, including for general reference paperback, the category that The Complete Directory won; in that year, the awarding agency presented dual awards for hardcover and paperback books in many categories (see NBF 2023). As Barnhart notes, this would be "the first and only time a prize would be given" in the general reference paperback category (see Barnhart 2007).) (This is why the tag, "American Book Award Winner!", appears on the book cover beginning with the second edition.)

== Critical reception ==
As television reporter and critic Aaron Barnhart notes, Brooks and Marsh's work appeared alongside existing references by the acclaimed Erik Barnouw (Tube of Plenty) and by TV writer Les Brown of The New York Times (Encyclopedia of Television); despite these, The Complete Directory was "immediately hailed as the best of the bunch, more comprehensive and a more enjoyable read". Barnhart's praise is uniformly high, referring to it as "one of the seven wonders of show business", and noting that the comprehensive nature of the work is "a testament to the vision of [the] two men who [took] great pride in handcrafting American TV's greatest single reference guide, online or offline".

== Features ==
According to the authors, the book is an attempt to list all commercially broadcast network series ever shown in the evening or nighttime hours (defined as 6:00 p.m. Eastern Standard Time or later) in the United States (i.e., prime time and the two hours preceding it). It also lists programs which were widely syndicated in the U.S., and, effective with the sixth edition in 1995, cable television series if, at the time they were aired, the cable network carrying them was available in at least 50% of U.S. homes.

Other criteria for inclusion from the original design of the book are:

- The series must have been carried on a commercial network. Programs produced for and by public broadcasters such as National Educational Television and the Public Broadcasting Service are excluded unless at some point in their existence they had a prime time network or commercial cable television run.
- The series must have run for at least four weeks on the same night of the week at the same time, or at least have been planned to do so in the event that it was cancelled prior to this.

Thus, specials and miniseries presented on consecutive nights are excluded, with an exception being made for the seminal miniseries Roots, and miniseries like North and South, Book II, which was originally presented in a nightly format but then subsequently rerun on a weekly basis. Also excluded are a very small number of short-run series that were not regularly scheduled, but ran each episode in a different timeslot. (1980's The Six O'Clock Follies, which ran for three episodes on NBC, is one such example.)

The book includes other features such as season-by-season schedule charts from 1946 to 2006, a list of top thirty Nielsen rated programs from October 1950 to May 2007, a list of Emmy Award winners season-by-season, and trivia quiz games. The eighth edition was published in 2003, followed by the ninth edition on October 18, 2007. The ninth edition in 2007 also includes individual listings for cable networks themselves.

Also included is "The Top 100 Series of All Time" (an updated ranking of the authors' first-ever ranking of the most popular TV shows from the book TV's Greatest Hits, published in 1985), a ranking that in the 9th edition includes data through the 2006–2007 season. The ranking is based on points for their audience-size ranks per season, and the number of seasons the shows were aired—thus, crediting series for their popularity and longevity. Some series that had remained on the air between editions had moved up on the list; 60 Minutes, which ranked #9 on the 1985 list, has since risen to #1 by virtue of its continued popularity.
