= Concert Tonight =

American music television series

- Starring: Rafael Kubelik (1953–54); Fritz Reiner (1954–55)
- Country of origin: United States

Production
- Producer: WGN-TV
- Running time: 60 minutes

Original release
- Network: DuMont
- Release: December 30, 1953 – April 6, 1955

Concert Tonight is an American music television series which aired on the now-defunct DuMont Television Network.

== Broadcast history ==
Concert Tonight first aired from December 30, 1953, to March 31, 1954, then was brought back from September 15, 1954, to April 6, 1955. During the 1954–55 season, Concert Tonight aired Wednesdays at 9 pm EST.

DuMont broadcast many music-based programs, including this one, which featured the Chicago Symphony performing an hour of music. The series was broadcast from DuMont affiliate WGN-TV in Chicago.

== Episode status ==
One episode survives at the UCLA Film and Television Archive, while the November 18, 1953 episode survives as part of the Peabody Award collection. Edie Adams, an actress and singer who worked at DuMont before the network ceased broadcasting during 1956, claimed that so little value was given to DuMont's programs that in the late 1970s they were loaded onto three trucks and dumped into Upper New York Bay.

Several episodes from the 1950s of the Chicago Symphony being conducted by Fritz Reiner (as well as by George Szell) have survived and are available on DVD.

== See also ==
- List of programs broadcast by the DuMont Television Network
- List of surviving DuMont Television Network broadcasts
- 1953-54 United States network television schedule
- 1954-55 United States network television schedule

== Bibliography ==
- David Weinstein, The Forgotten Network: DuMont and the Birth of American Television (Philadelphia: Temple University Press, 2004) ISBN 1-59213-245-6
- Alex McNeil, Total Television, Fourth edition (New York: Penguin Books, 1980) ISBN 0-14-024916-8
- Tim Brooks and Earle Marsh, The Complete Directory to Prime Time Network TV Shows, Third edition (New York: Ballantine Books, 1964) ISBN 0-345-31864-1
