= The Jo Stafford Show (1954 TV series) =

- Jo Stafford and husband/conductor Paul Weston on The Jo Stafford Show.
- Genre: Variety
- Starring: Jo Stafford
- Country of origin: United States
- Original language: English
- No. of seasons: 1

Production
- Camera setup: Multi-camera
- Running time: 15 minutes

Original release
- Network: CBS
- Release: 1954 – 1955

Related
- Douglas Edwards with the News (7:30 pm EST, 1954–1955); The Red Skelton Show (8 p.m. EST, 1954–1955); The Tony Martin Show; The Dinah Shore Show

The Jo Stafford Show is a 15-minute musical variety program which aired on CBS in prime time in the 1954–1955 television season. Paul Weston wrote a special theme song for the show.

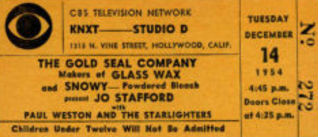
Studio audience ticket from the program, 1954.

The show had the same cast of regular performers Stafford worked with during her Chesterfield Supper Club shows from Hollywood. Paul Weston and his Orchestra and the Starlighters provided the music and vocal accompaniments on the television show just as they had done on Stafford's hosted "Supper Club" radio programs.

The television program was done live. During the year it aired, an episode featured loss of her skirt on one show while singing "Let Me Go, Lover!". One of the cast members tripped, and as he fell, a button on his coat caught in Stafford's costume. Her skirt falling along with the actor, Stafford tried holding onto it while singing "Let me go".

The decision to end Stafford's television program was not hers, but that of CBS. At the time of the cancellation, the show's sponsor, Gold Seal Company, contemplated moving the Stafford program to NBC. The loss of the television show was another factor in Stafford's move from Columbia Records, owned by CBS, back to Capitol Records, where she had her first solo recording contract. Stafford received an Emmy nomination in 1955 as Best Female Singer for her work on the program.
