= Robin Romano =

U. Roberto (Robin) Romano
- Born: Umberto Roberto Romano, Jr. New York City, U.S.
- Died: November 1, 2013 (aged 56–57); New York, U.S.
- Education: Amherst College (1980)
- Occupations: Documentary filmmaker, producer, photographer, educator, human rights activist
- Known for: Faces of Freedom (2009), The Harvest/La Cosecha (2010)

U. Roberto Romano (1956-2013), also known as Robin Romano, was an American documentary filmmaker, producer, photojournalist and human rights activist. He is known for directing Stolen Childhoods (2005), The Dark Side of Chocolate (2010) and The Harvest/La Cosecha (2010) and for campaigning against exploitative labor practices. In addition to filmmaking, Romano's photography documented child and migrant labor worldwide. The Romano archives are housed at the Thomas J. Dodd Research Center at the University of Connecticut.

== Life ==
Romano was born in New York City in 1956. His father was the portrait painter and Works Progress Administration muralist Umberto Romano (died September 27, 1982); his mother was Clorinda Corcia. Romano Sr. was born in Bracigliano, near Salerno, Italy, and migrated to the United States at the age of 9 with his parents. Romano Jr. attended the Lycée Français de New York, Allen-Stevenson School and Horace Mann High School. He graduated from Amherst College as an Interdisciplinary Scholar in 1980. Romano began his filmmaking career as a producer and cameraman for Les Productions de Sagittaire in Montreal. He died at his home of complications related to Lyme disease.

== Career ==
=== Filmmaking ===
Romano's filmmaking documented child labor in rug manufacturing in Pakistan and India, migrant farm labor in the United States and Mexico, and the cocoa industry in the Ivory Coast. He contributed to CNN, PBS, NPR, BBC and European broadcasts on slavery and child labor. Stolen Childhoods was the first theatrically released feature documentary on global child labor. The Harvest was executive produced by the actor Eva Longoria and was premiered at the International Documentary Film Festival in Amsterdam in November 2010.

Romano's documentaries won several awards. The Harvest received the Audience Award at the Festival Internazationale di Cinema in Trento, Italy (2012), the Special Achievement Award at the ALMA Awards (2011), the Outstanding Filmmaker Award at the San Antonio Film Festival (2011) and the Conflict and Resolution Award at the Hamptons International Film Festival (2009). The Dark Side of Chocolate won the Grand Prize at the Festival Internazationale di Cinema (2011) and was a Cinema for Peace finalist at the Berlin Film Festival (2012).

=== Photography ===
Romano's still photography exhibit, "Stolen Childhoods: The Global Plague of Child Labor", was on view at the William Benton Museum of Art in 2006 and his "Faces of Freedom" collection was featured on the CNN Freedom Project in 2011. His work has been used by the Council on Foreign Relations, the Global March Against Child Labor, Human Rights Watch, Amnesty International, the International Labor Organization, The Hunger Project, International Labor Rights Forum, the Farm Labor Organizing Committee and Antislavery International.

In 2015, Romano's total body of work, including his research files, video master tapes and digital files, hundreds of interviews, thousands of digital photos and prints and research files, was donated to the University of Connecticut Archives and Special Collections. The gift was made by Len Morris, Romano's friend and collaborator for over 30 years.

== Activism ==
Due to his efforts to raise the profile of child labor in global consciousness, Romano was invited to speak at many conventions, conferences and universities. He gave the Frank Porter Graham Lecture at the Johnson Center for Academic Excellence, University of North Carolina - Chapel Hill, and the Gene and Georgia Mittelman Distinguished Lecture in the Arts at the University of Connecticut. In 2007, he addressed the Association of Farmworker Opportunity Programs annual conference in Coeur d'Alene. In 2010, he visited Capitol Hill to screen scenes from his film The Harvest, which documented migrant child labor on American farms. Romano lobbied Congress for the passage of the Children's Act for Responsible Employment (CARE Act, HR 3564), first proposed in 2009 by Representative Lucille Roybal-Allard, aimed at strengthening protections for children working in the agriculture industry.

== Filmography ==
- Globalization and Human Rights (PBS film) (1998)
- Stolen Childhoods (2005)
- The Dark Side of Chocolate (2010)
- The Harvest/La Cosecha (2010)
- Death of a Slave Boy
