= Faces of Freedom =

Exhibition of photos taken in South Asia

The "Faces of Freedom" photo exhibition is a collection of photographs captured by photo-journalist, filmmaker and human rights educator U. Roberto (Robin) Romano, during his travels to India, Nepal and Pakistan. Romano explores the exploitation of child labor in the production of handmade rugs in coordination with multiple international organizations, such as the World Bank, UNICEF, International Labour Organization and others to reduce the number of child laborers in that industry. The exhibit has been shown in many United States cities since its first exhibit in 2009. Faces of Freedom has been included in CNN Freedom Projects of modern slavery.

== Child labor ==
To combat exploitation of child labor, the World Bank with UNICEF, International Labour Organization (ILO) and Understanding Children's Work Initiative to bring awareness of the scope of the problem. The World Bank estimates that there are 218 million children who are victim to unfair child labor practices. The children's ages range from five to seventeen years of age. The handmade rug industry is one of industries involved in exploitation of child labor. The World Bank works with country-based and non-governmental organizations (NGOs) in an effort to "combat child labor."

The United Nations and the International Labour Organization consider child labor exploitative, with the UN stipulating, in article 32 of the Convention on the Rights of the Child that:

...States Parties recognize the right of the child to be protected from economic exploitation and from performing any work that is likely to be hazardous or to interfere with the child's education, or to be harmful to the child's health or physical, mental, spiritual, moral or social development. Although globally there is an estimated 250 million children working.

According to the census in 1990 nearly 18% of all the children in America are working in different organizations. The Supreme Court banned child labor in 1916 but the law became visible in 1941. The labor department is also not paying attention to the child labor in USA therefore children are still employed in the organizations. The age of the children who are employed is between 15 years to 17 years. They are nearly 3.7 million children who work in different factories. There is an interesting fact that more than 600 children died in work related accidents.

== Exhibit ==
U. Roberto Romano, a photographer, filmmaker and humans right activist, traveled to India, Nepal and Pakistan to record the plight of child laborers in the handmade rug industry. He also gathered photographs and stories of children who have been rescued by the GoodWeave organization, previously known as Rugmark.

The Faces of Freedom exhibit is a collection of photos by U. Roberto Romano that provides insight into the lives, poor living conditions and faces of child rug-weavers of South Asia. Messages of hope are portrayed in the photographs and stories of children that were assisted by the GoodWeave program to attain school education. A selection of handmade rugs made without child labor is also exhibited.

After initial showings in San Francisco, New York and Washington, D.C., the collection has been exhibited in major cities across the United States since 2009.

== News media ==
In late 2010, the Faces of Freedom exhibit was featured the ABC television network show Good Morning America. On April 18, 2011, Faces of Freedom was covered in CNN Freedom Project's of modern slavery. The piece appears on CNN website with a slideshow of images of GoodWeave's Faces of Freedom photo exhibition.

== Related projects ==
U. Roberto (Robin) Romano is an investigative filmmaker, where he has been director, director of photography, still photographer and/or producer in the following efforts:

The Harvest

The Harvest is a feature documentary on the life of migrant children and their families in America. It revisits Edward R. Murrow’s Harvest of Shame, filmed 40 years ago, and reveals that little has changed over the past 4 decades in the lives of migrant farm workers in America. The Harvest, however, is told from a child’s perspective as we meet 4 of the more than 400,000 children between the ages of 5 and 16 who labor in fields and factories to feed us, lacking the protections offered by the Fair Labor Standards Act that all other American children enjoy. In 2009, Eva Longoria signed on as an Executive Producer of the project. The Harvest premiered at the IDFA festival in Amsterdam in November 2010 and will premier in the US in early 2011.

Dark Side of Chocolate

A feature documentary, The Dark Side of Chocolate explores West African children in cocoa production. The 2010 documentary The Dark Side of Chocolate alleged that Nestlé purchased cocoa beans from Ivory Coast plantations that use child slave labor. The children are usually 12 to 15 years old, and some are trafficked from nearby countries. In September 2001, Bradley Alford, Chairman and CEO of Nestlé USA signed the Harkin–Engel Protocol (commonly called the Cocoa Protocol), an international agreement aimed at ending child labor in the production of cocoa. A 2009 joint police operation conducted by Interpol and Ivorian law enforcement officers resulted in the rescue of 54 children and the arrest of eight people involved in the illegal recruitment of children.

Fields of Peril

Fields in Peril is a 99-page report by Human Rights Watch about child labor in the United States, the least protected are children who work in agriculture. Labor laws for the agriculture industry, such as minimum age, length of a work day and management of hazardous conditions, are more lenient than those for any other industry.

Children in the Fields

Children in the Fields in an educational documentary produced in 2008 by the Association of Farmworker Opportunity Programs about migrant children working in fields in the United States. Through children, their parents and experts the short documentary explores some of the reasons for child labor exploitation in U.S. agriculture and ways to combat the problem. It was filmed in Minnesota, North Dakota, and Texas.

Stolen Childhoods

A feature documentary on global child labor exploitation affecting nearly 250 million children. The film, narrated by actress Meryl Streep, covers factors affecting the children: working conditions, slavery, and bonded labor. Children's stories from eight countries, including the United States, tell of children exposed to pesticides, chained to their work areas, and even kidnapped and forced into slavery or prostitution. In addition to providing background for why this occurs and implications to the global community, it also offers hope through stories of children's lives have been saved and what actions can be taken to combat child labor.
