= CARE Act (disambiguation) =

The CARE Act (Child Abuse Reform and Enforcement Act) is a 2000 US law.

CARE Act or Care Act or similar may also refer to:

- Ryan White CARE Act (Ryan White Comprehensive AIDS Resources Emergency Act), a 1990 US law
- Affordable Care Act (ObamaCare), a 2010 US law
- CARES Act (Coronavirus Aid, Relief, and Economic Security Act), a 2020 US law
- The UK Care Act 2014, relating to adult care, support and health matters
- Children's Act for Responsible Employment, a US bill to bring parity to child agriculture workers with other occupation workers
- Veterans Cannabis Analysis, Research, and Effectiveness Act, a 2021 and 2023–2024 US bill

== See also ==
- Care (disambiguation)
- Act (disambiguation)
