= What's the Story (disambiguation) =

What's the Story was a DuMont Television Network game show (1951-1955), and it also may refer to:

- (What's the Story) Morning Glory?, an album by Oasis
- Hey Tony! What's the Story?, an American pornographic movie
- Kevin Bridges: What's the Story?, a British television programme
- "What's the Story in Balamory", the theme tune to British children's television show Balamory
- What's The Story? a topical radio panel show made by Tidy Productions for BBC Radio Wales, hosted by Tom Price
