= The Harvest (2010 film) =

- Directed by: U. Roberto Romano
- Produced by: U. Roberto Romano, Rory O'Connor
- Cinematography: U. Roberto Romano
- Edited by: Nick Clark
- Music by: Wendy Blackstone
- Production companies: Globalvision; Shine Global
- Distributed by: Cinema Libre Studio
- Release dates: December 2010 (IDFA); July 29, 2011 (United States)
- Running time: 80 minutes
- Country: United States
- Languages: English; Spanish
- Budget: $560,000

The Harvest (Spanish: La Cosecha) is a 2010 documentary film about agricultural child labor in America. The film depicts children as young as 12 years of age who work as many as 12 hours a day, six months a year, subject to hazardous conditions: heat exposure, pesticides, and dangerous work. The agriculture industry has been subject to significantly more lenient labor laws than any other occupation in the United States. As a result, lack of consistent schooling significantly limits their opportunities of succeeding in high school or more. The hazardous conditions threaten their health and lives. The purpose of the documentary is to bring awareness of the harsh working conditions which tens of thousands of children face in the fields of the United States each year and to enact the Children's Act for Responsible Employment (CARE Act, HR 3564) which will bring parity of labor conditions to field workers that are afforded to minors in other occupations.

== Background ==
The Fair Labor Standards Act (FLSA) has different standards for children working in agriculture than in any other industry. The Association of Farmworker Opportunity Programs estimates that there are between 400,000 and 500,000 children working in the farming industry. Children as young as 12 years of age work in the fields. There is no minimum number of hours worked a day, aside from being outside school hours. They are exposed to the sun, harmful pesticides and hazardous conditions. Children are in up to three times greater danger of exposure to pesticides than adults due to their size and stage of development. The fatality rate is six times that in any other industry: children account for 20% of all deaths on farms. Although agriculture is a hazardous occupation, no statistics are maintained on child laborers and serious accidents.

Children who work on farms or in fields spend on average 30 hours a week, even during times of the year when school is in session. Of the children who work on farms, 50% of them will not graduate from high school. The United States Department of Labor estimates that children earn about $1,000 in one year.

== Production ==
The Harvest is a feature documentary film on the life of migrant children and their families in the United States. It revisits Edward R. Murrow’s Harvest of Shame, filmed 53 years ago, and reveals that little has changed over the past five decades in the lives of migrant farm workers in the United States. The Harvest, however, is told from a child's perspective as it presents three of the more than 400,000 children between the ages of 5 and 16 who labor in fields and factories, lacking the protections offered by the Fair Labor Standards Act that all other American children enjoy.

The film profiles several children and their families as they work through the 2009–2010 harvest seasons, facing risks of being separated, deported or death. A twelve-year-old girl, Zulema L., works in a field of strawberries. One of her earliest memories is being taught by her mother to pick and clean strawberries. Zulema struggles academically because of the family's seasonal movement. She has attended eight different schools in eight years. Not confident that she will make it to high school, she has no dreams about what her future could hold. The documentary tracks other children with their own stories of living a life of a child laborer.

Work began on the documentary in June 2007 and through the 2009–2010 harvests. In that time the project has followed harvests in Minnesota, North Dakota, Texas, Florida, Georgia, North Carolina and Ohio. The documentary was shot with cinematic scope. Post-production began in early winter 2010, with the completion of the film in fall 2010.

The Harvest was produced by Shine Global in association with Globalvision, Romano Film and Photography, and Eva Longoria's UnbeliEVAble Productions. Longoria signed on as an executive producer of the project in 2009. It was directed by U. Roberto (Robin) Romano, photographer of Faces of Freedom.

=== Screenings ===
The Harvest premiered at the International Documentary Film Festival IDFA in Amsterdam in November 2010, and at the Guadalajara International Film Festival in Guadalajara, Mexico on March 26, 2011. Distributed by Cinema Libre, The film had its theatrical debut in New York City on July 29, 2011, and became available on DVD October 2011.

== CARE legislation ==
Eva Longoria, director U. Roberto Romano, and associate director Julia Perez visited Capitol Hill to mark the anniversary of Representative Lucille Roybal-Allard's introduction of the CARE Act legislation in September 2009. The Children's Act for Responsible Employment (CARE Act, HR 3564) addresses the harshest conditions that tens of thousands of children as young as 12 years of age may be subject to, such as restrictions in the number of hours that children work in a day. The intention of the bill is to raise the standard for children working in agriculture to that of any other occupation in the United States. As of September 1, 2010, the bill had 103 co-sponsors. While on Capitol Hill, Longoria and Romano showed scenes from the feature-length documentary to illustrate the harsh working conditions and exploitation of children in the fields.

A trailer of the film was first privately screened at a United States Department of Labor panel discussion, hosted by Secretary of Labor Hilda Solis and including Dolores Huerta of the United Farm Workers, filmmaker Robin Romano, Mark Lara from the Department of Labor's Wage and Hour Division, and other experts. During the presentation, details of Roybal-Allard's bill were outlined: a child must be a minimum of 14 years of age to work in the fields, children under the age of 16 are restricted from working in the fields if it affects their health or school performance, and children under the age of 18 are restricted from hazardous work.

== United Nations ==
On August 12, 2014, the film's Associate Director, Julia Perez, spoke before the United Nations Committee on the Elimination of Racial Discrimination on behalf of farm worker rights and child labor in U.S. agriculture. The UN press release mentioned exposure to pesticides, wage theft, sexual assault, police harassment and other illegal working conditions faced by children—largely Latino children who either were born in the United States or migrated with their families.

== See also ==
- International Labour Organization
- Migrant worker
