= Love Story (1954 TV series) =

- Genre: Anthology
- Created by: David Lowe
- Starring: Beatrice Straight; Basil Rathbone; Arthur O'Connell; Mildred Natwick; Leslie Nielsen
- Country of origin: United States

Production
- Running time: 30 minutes

Original release
- Network: DuMont
- Release: April 20 – June 29, 1954

Love Story is an early American anthology series which was broadcast on the DuMont Television Network in 1954.

This show should not be confused with NBC's dramatic anthology series Love Story which aired during the 1973–1974 television season.

== Broadcast history ==
The series, an anthology, ran from April to June of 1954. DuMont's Love Story is not to be confused with another dramatic anthology with the same name which ran on NBC in the 1970s, or a game show also titled Love Story which aired on CBS from 1955–1956.

Love Story aired live on Tuesday nights at 8:30 pm EST on most DuMont affiliates. The series was produced by David Lowe.

== Criticism ==
This series was hampered by a small budget and starred mostly lesser-known actors. Latter-day critics, such as Castleman and Podrazik (1982), have cited Love Story, among other DuMont series, as one of the reasons fewer and fewer viewers tuned in to the ailing DuMont Network. They called the series "a simpering romance anthology" that, like several other DuMont programs during the 1953–1954 season was "doomed from the start by third-rate scripts and cheap production." The series did not last long, and the network itself began crumbling shortly thereafter.

== See also ==
- List of programs broadcast by the DuMont Television Network
- List of surviving DuMont Television Network broadcasts

== Bibliography ==
- David Weinstein, The Forgotten Network: DuMont and the Birth of American Television (Philadelphia: Temple University Press, 2004) ISBN 1-59213-245-6
- Alex McNeil, Total Television, Fourth edition (New York: Penguin Books, 1980) ISBN 0-14-024916-8
- Tim Brooks and Earle Marsh, The Complete Directory to Prime Time Network and Cable TV Shows, Ninth edition (New York: Ballantine Books, 2007) ISBN 978-0-345-49773-4
