= John R. King =

John R. King may refer to:

- John Reed King, American radio and television game show host
- J. Robert King, American author who uses the pen name John R. King
