= Alec Templeton =

British composer (1909/10–1963)

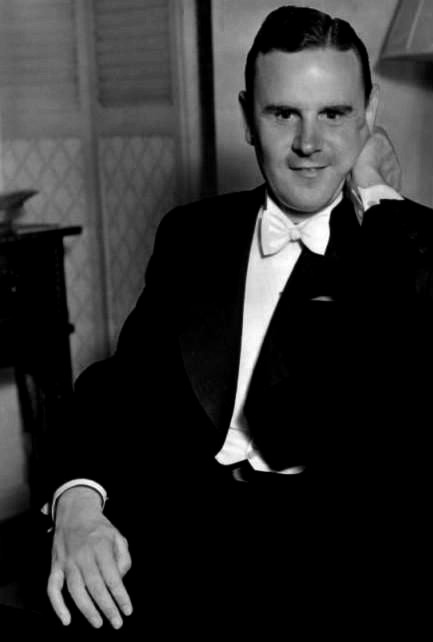
- Templeton in the 1940s

Background information
- Born: 4 July 1910; Cardiff, Wales
- Died: 28 March 1963 (aged 52) Greenwich, Connecticut, US

Alec Andrew Templeton (4 July 1910 – 28 March 1963) was a Welsh composer, pianist, and satirist.

== Early years ==
Templeton was born in Cardiff, Wales. There is some confusion concerning Templeton's year of birth. Most published and Internet biographies give his birth year as 1909, and it was certainly registered in September of that year, but his headstone shows 1910 as his year of birth. Blind from birth and gifted with absolute pitch, he studied from the age of 9 at Worcester College, Oxford with Ivor Atkins (organ) and later at London's Royal Academy of Music, where his piano teachers were Lloyd Powell and Isador Goodman.

== Radio and recordings ==
In 1936, he moved from Wales to the United States as a member of Jack Hylton's Jazz Band, where he played with a number of orchestras and gave his first radio performances on The Rudy Vallée Show, The Chase and Sanborn Hour, Kraft Music Hall and The Magic Key of RCA.

His first recordings were made for The Gramophone Shop Inc. of 18 East 48th St, New York in 1936 for their "Varieties" label. Two sets of 4 10-inch (25 cm) recordings were issued, the first set entitled "Musical Impressions" on nos. 1006–1009 included:- "Impressions of Old-Fashioned Italian Grand Opera," "A Trip Through a Music Conservatory," "The Shortest Wagnerian Opera," "Impressions of Two German Lieder Singers," "The Lost Chord," "An Amateur Performance of Gilbert and Sullivan," "The Music Goes 'Round and Around," and "Improvisations on Five Varied Melodies." The second set entitled "His Own Compositions" on nos. 1010–1013 included:- "Topsy Turvy Suite" nos. 1–3 ("Bach Goes to Town," "Soldier's Minuet," "Undertaker's Toccata"), "Ghost Rhapsody," "Longing," "Pines," "Voyage a La Lune," "Mother's Lullaby," and "Friendship."

Signing a recording contract with RCA Victor in 1939, he made a string of amusing sides including "Man with New Radio" and a pseudo-operatic rendering of "And the Angels Sing" (written by the trumpeter and bandleader Ziggy Elman). A set of three 78-rpm records called "Musical Portraits" was issued by RCA Victor as catalogue number P-19; it continued in the catalogue until the late '40s, and included "Mozart Matriculates." He also did six sides for Columbia in August 1940, including an instrumental entitled "Redwoods at Bohemian Grove" (he had been accepted into that organization). In 1942 he did eight sides for Decca, six of them released as a three-record set with catalogue number A-314.

Templeton's compositions sometimes presented tongue-in-cheek variations on classical composers, including "Mendelssohn Mows 'em Down," "Scarlatti Stoops to Conga," and "Bach Goes to Town," the latter covered by both Benny Goodman's band (1938) and The Chamber Music Society of Lower Basin Street (1941). Templeton was an avid fan of the Lower Basin Street radio show, a weekly hot-jazz jam session, and often appeared as a guest soloist.

Templeton developed his own following on radio. Alec Templeton Time, sponsored by Alka-Seltzer, was first broadcast from 1939 to 1941 (initially as a 1939 summer replacement for Fibber McGee and Molly), returning in 1943 and 1946–47. It was sometimes known as The Alec Templeton Show. Guests included Kay Lorraine and Pearl Bailey. He memorized the scripts for his shows by having them read to him 20 times. Templeton became so familiar as a summertime attraction that a reviewer in Variety called him "that perennial summer replacement favorite." From June 3 to August 26, 1955, his TV show It's Alec Templeton Time aired on the DuMont Television Network. He also appeared in the later DuMont series Jazz Party.

== Later years and death ==
Through the 1950s he played with the Cincinnati Symphony Orchestra playing jazz and classical works. Two of them were recorded for the Remington label, one of Gershwin works and another of improvisations on Offenbach and Strauss.

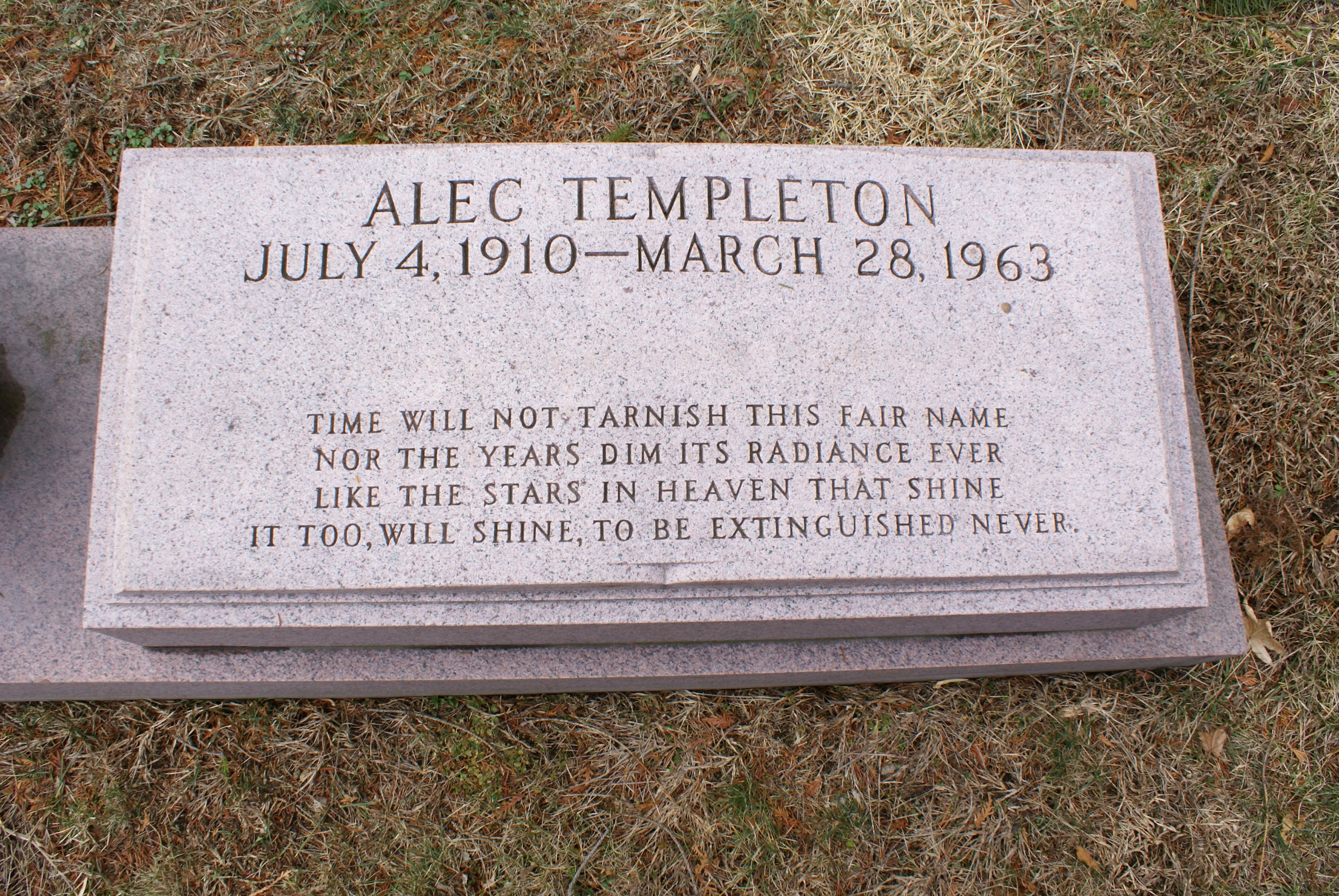
The grave of Alec Templeton, with 1910 given as year of birth

Experimenting with the new recording medium of audio tape, Alec was able to make sounds with the piano similar to what Les Paul was doing with guitar (recording at half-speed so as to play back doubly fast). Two albums were issued using this technique: "Magic Piano" on Atlantic (LP #1222) and "Smart Alec" for ABC-Paramount (ABC-100). He also made two albums for children on the Riverside label: "Children's Concert" and "Mother Goose Songs." There were also two LPs of recordings consisting of the sounds from Alec's music box collection, the first for the "Ficker Recording Service" of Greenwich, Connecticut (mastered by Columbia), and the second recorded for RCA Victor.

He died, aged 52, in Greenwich, Connecticut, from an undisclosed illness and is interred at Putnam Cemetery in Greenwich.
