= Eva Longoria =

American actress (born 1975)

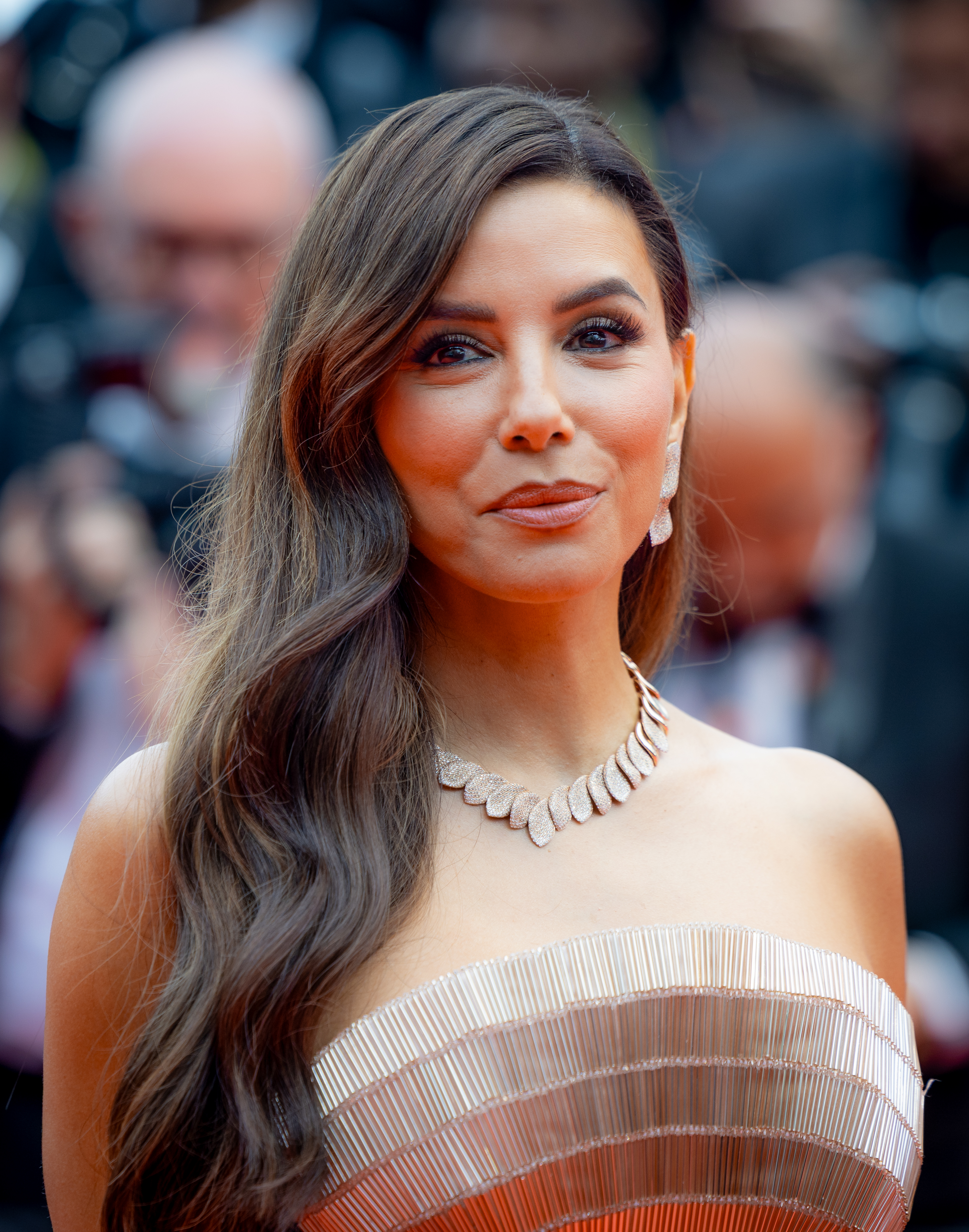
- Longoria in 2025
- Born: Eva Jacqueline Longoria; March 15, 1975 (age 51); Corpus Christi, Texas, U.S.
- Other names: Eva Longoria Christopher; Eva Longoria Parker; Eva Longoria Bastón
- Education: Texas A&M University-Kingsville (BS); California State University, Northridge (MA)
- Occupations: Actress; producer; director; businesswoman
- Years active: 1999–present
- Spouses: Tyler Christopher (m. 2002; div. 2004) Tony Parker (m. 2007; div. 2011) José Bastón (m. 2016)
- Children: 1

Eva Jacqueline Longoria Bastón (née Longoria; born March 15, 1975) is an American actress, producer, director, and businesswoman. After several guest roles on television, she gained popularity for her portrayal of Isabella Braña on the CBS daytime soap opera The Young and the Restless (2001–2003). Her breakthrough role as Gabrielle Solis on the ABC television series Desperate Housewives (2004–2012) earned her two Screen Actors Guild Awards and a Golden Globe nomination. She has appeared in the films The Sentinel (2006), Over Her Dead Body (2008), For Greater Glory (2012), Frontera (2014), Lowriders (2016), and Overboard (2018), winning an Imagen Award for the latter. She guest-starred on the Hulu mystery comedy-drama series Only Murders in the Building (2024), earning her a third Screen Actors Guild Award for Outstanding Performance by an Ensemble in a Comedy Series.

In 2005, Longoria founded UnbeliEVAble Entertainment, a film and television production company. In 2023, the company was acquired by Hyphenate Media Group, a production company co-founded by Longoria and Cris Abrego. She also executive produced the Lifetime television series Devious Maids (2013–2016), the short-lived NBC sitcom Telenovela (2015–2016) in which she starred, and the films The Harvest (2010) and Food Chains (2014). Her directorial ventures include the television series Ashley Garcia: Genius in Love (2020), for which she was nominated at the Daytime Creative Arts Emmys, and the Oscar-nominated film Flamin' Hot (2023).

Eva Longoria received a star on the Hollywood Walk of Fame in 2018. She has appeared in several advertising campaigns, including with L'Oréal, New York & Co, Pepsi, and launched her own fashion and perfumes brand in 2017. Her other business ventures include opening the restaurant Beso in 2008, investing in businesses and films such as John Wick (2014), and publishing a cookbook.

== Early life and education ==
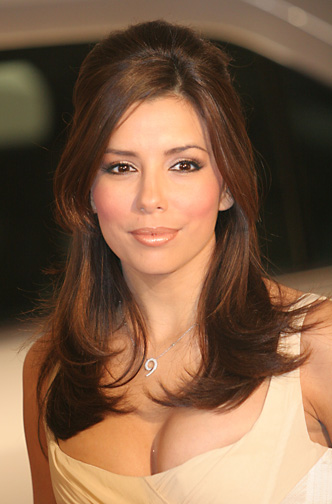
Longoria in 2006

Longoria was born in Corpus Christi, Texas, on March 15, 1975, the youngest of the four daughters of her Tejano parents Ella Longoria (née Mireles) and Enrique Longoria Jr. One of her sisters has special needs. Longoria told Redbook in 2016:

There was never any resentment, because I saw how hard my mother worked and all she did for my sister [with special needs], and I wanted to do whatever I could to help. We all did.

She was raised Roman Catholic. She did not speak Spanish growing up, and did not learn the language until 2009. While in high school, she worked at a Wendy's restaurant part-time for three years, initially so she could raise funds for her quinceañera. Longoria previously told the press how her years in fast food as a teen shaped her work ethic, saying "I couldn't wait to get to work and make my own money." Longoria earned her Bachelor of Science degree in kinesiology at Texas A&M University-Kingsville. At that time (1998), she also won the title of Miss Corpus Christi USA. After completing college, she entered a talent contest that led her to Los Angeles; and shortly thereafter, was spotted and signed by a theatrical agent. While auditioning for roles, she worked as a headhunter for four years. Longoria has publicly credited Jennifer Lopez as being an inspiration to her early in her career. "Jennifer broke down so many doors so that we could walk through them," she told the magazine People. "And she kicked them down. They were not easy doors." She also described Tejana legend Selena as being "my idol, my inspiration" and "the reason I even dared to dream that a better life was possible." After three years at California State University, Northridge, she received her master's degree in Chicano studies in May 2013. "This place was probably the place I grew most in my life… I was exhausted the whole time I was here," she laughs. "I did night school. I would finish filming [Desperate Housewives] and come here 7 to 10 at night, and then, go home and do it all again. Be on set at 5:00 a.m. It fills my heart with my Mexican pride." Her thesis was "Success STEMS From Diversity: The Value of Latinas in STEM Careers".

== Career ==
=== 2000s ===
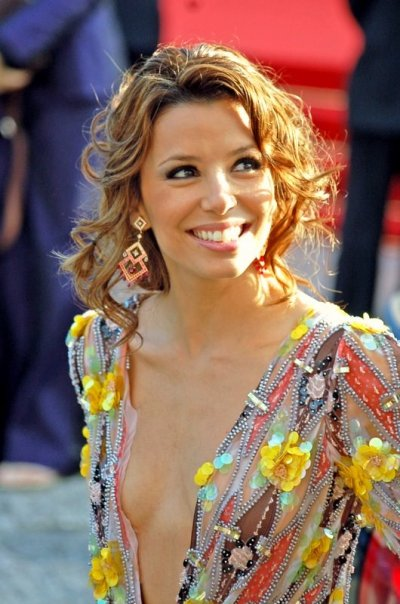
Longoria in 2006 at the Cannes Film Festival premiere of Pan's Labyrinth

Longoria guest-starred in an episode of Beverly Hills, 90210. Another guest appearance on General Hospital the same year led to a contract role on the CBS Daytime soap opera The Young and the Restless, where she portrayed Isabella Braña from 2001 to 2003.

After leaving that show, she appeared in the 2003 revival of Jack Webb's long-running Dragnet media franchise. She then starred in Señorita Justice, a poorly received direct-to-video film; and a television film, The Dead Will Tell.

In 2003, Longoria was cast as Gabrielle Solis in the ABC comedy-drama Desperate Housewives. She later commented, "I think it's funny when people say I'm an overnight sensation, because I've been working at it for 10 years." Shortly after her debut on Desperate Housewives, she starred in a direct-to-video film, Carlita's Secret, for which she was also co-producer.

In 2006, she was nominated for a Golden Globe Award for Best Performance by an Actress in a Television Series – Musical or Comedy, along with her co-stars in Desperate Housewives. That year, she received the ALMA Award, and was named entertainer of the year. She also starred opposite Michael Douglas and Kiefer Sutherland in the thriller The Sentinel (2006)—her first major role in a theatrical feature film—and played Sylvia in Harsh Times, starring Freddy Rodríguez and Christian Bale.

In the 2000s, Longoria appeared in several high-profile advertising campaigns and numerous men's magazines, reaching No. 14 in the FHM "Sexiest Women 2008" poll. She was also featured on the cover of various international women's magazines, including Vogue, Marie Claire and Harper's Bazaar. People en Español listed her among its "Most Beautiful People" for 2003. She continues to be included in lists of Hollywood's Most Beautiful. She was listed as No. 1 in Maxim's Hottest Female Stars of 2005 and 2006, the first woman to top the list in two consecutive years. She was ranked No. 9 in the magazine's Hot 100 of 2007 list. In honor of Maxim's 100th issue in 2006, she was featured on a 75-by-110-foot (23 by 34 m) vinyl mesh replica of its January 2005 cover located in a Clark County, Nevada desert. More recently, she was ranked No. 14 of People's Most Beautiful 2011. People named her one of 2012 Most Beautiful at Every Age.

In January 2007, Longoria was chosen to be the first face of Bebe Sport. She appeared in the Spring/Summer 2007 campaign, photographed by Greg Kadel. She also holds contracts with L'Oréal, and New York & Co. She also contracts with Magnum Ice-Cream and Heineken. She was a part of Microsoft's "I'm A PC" ad campaign. She and Tony Parker have appeared together in campaigns for London Fog. She became a spokesperson for L'Oréal Paris in 2005 and was still being featured in L'Oréal TV commercials and print ads as of 2016.

=== 2010s ===
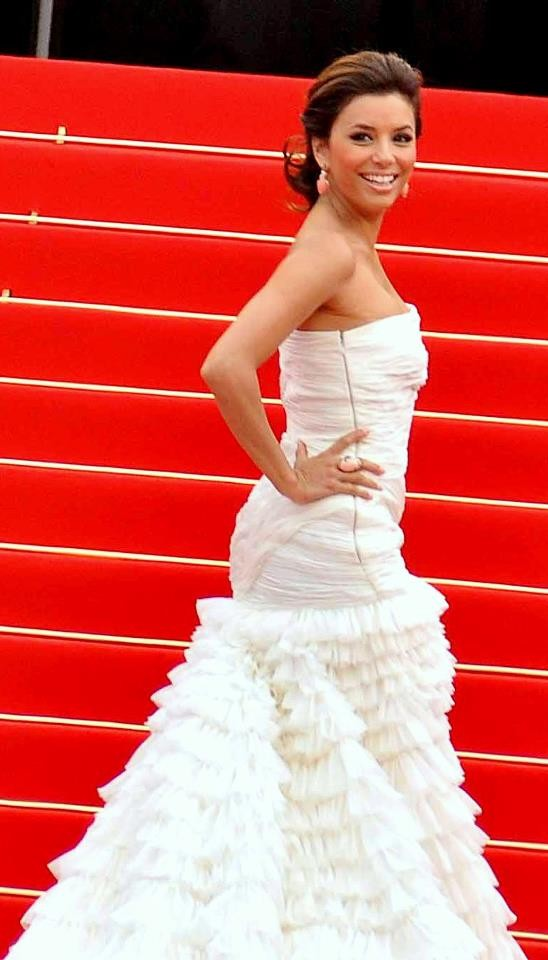
Longoria at the 2010 Cannes Film Festival

In the summer of 2010, she was a judge on The Next Food Network Star; and in October, she hosted the MTV Europe Music Awards 2010 in Madrid, Spain.

Based on her earnings from June 1, 2009, to June 1, 2010, Longoria was ranked No. 4 on Forbes Prime Time's 10 Top-Earning Women with an estimated $12 million. She topped the Forbes magazine's list of the highest-paid TV actresses for 2011.

In 2013, Longoria professed that she was a "cat lady", and appeared as a spokesperson for Sheba Cat Food.

From 2013, she served as one of the executive producers of Devious Maids and directed the season two premiere, "An Ideal Husband". In 2016, she also starred in the fourth season, in the episode "Once More Unto the Bleach". She is also an executive producer of the documentaries The Harvest and Food Chains, for which she won a James Beard Foundation Award.

In 2014, she had a recurring role in the TV show Brooklyn Nine-Nine.

In 2015, NBC announced plans for a sitcom called Telenovela in which Longoria starred as a popular telenovela actress. It was filmed with a single camera. It ran for only one season.

In August 2016, Longoria's production company, UnbeliEVAble Entertainment, signed a two-year first-look deal with Universal Pictures.

In 2017, Longoria directed the season three finale episode of the ABC comedy Black-ish. The same year, she was attached to the pilot of a workplace comedy, Type-A.

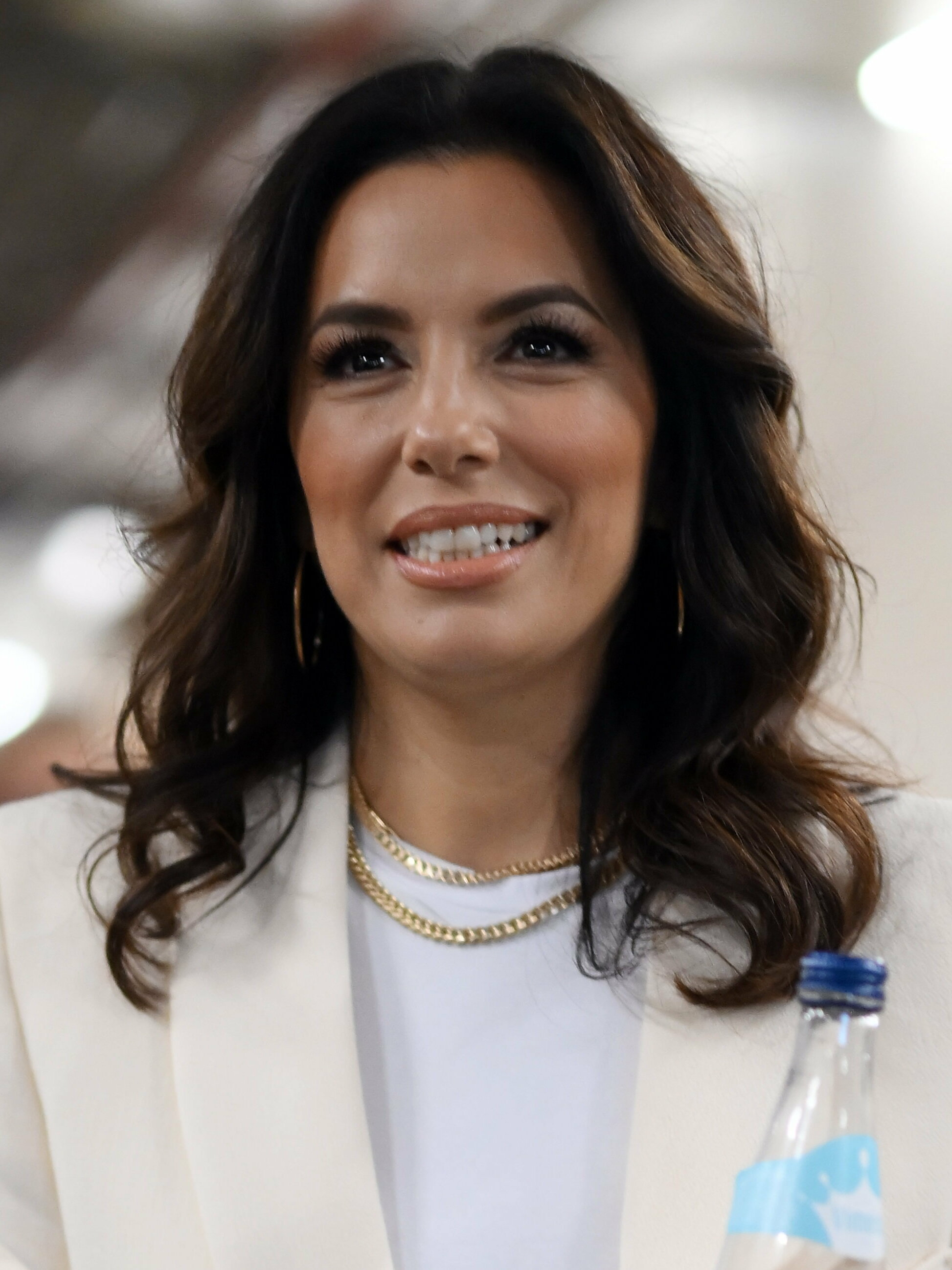
Longoria at the Web Summit in 2022

In 2018, Longoria attended the premiere for her new film, Dog Days with co-stars Vanessa Hudgens (Tara) and Nina Dobrev (Elizabeth) on August 5, 2018.

=== 2020s ===
In August 2019, Longoria was announced as the director of the biopic Flamin' Hot, her feature-length directorial debut. The film was released in 2023, amid a controversy into the authenticity of the subject matter.

In September 2020, UnbeliEVAble Entertainment renewed a three-year first-look deal with 20th Television.

In 2021, Longoria was working with Kenya Barris to develop a possible new television series Brown-ish about a Latino family.

She will produce a Spanish-language adaptation of the television series Call My Agent! for Latin America and the U.S. and direct the first two episodes.

In June 2024, the Los Angeles Times featured Longoria in its "L.A. Influential" series as a "creator who is leaving their mark" in Los Angeles.

== Other ventures ==
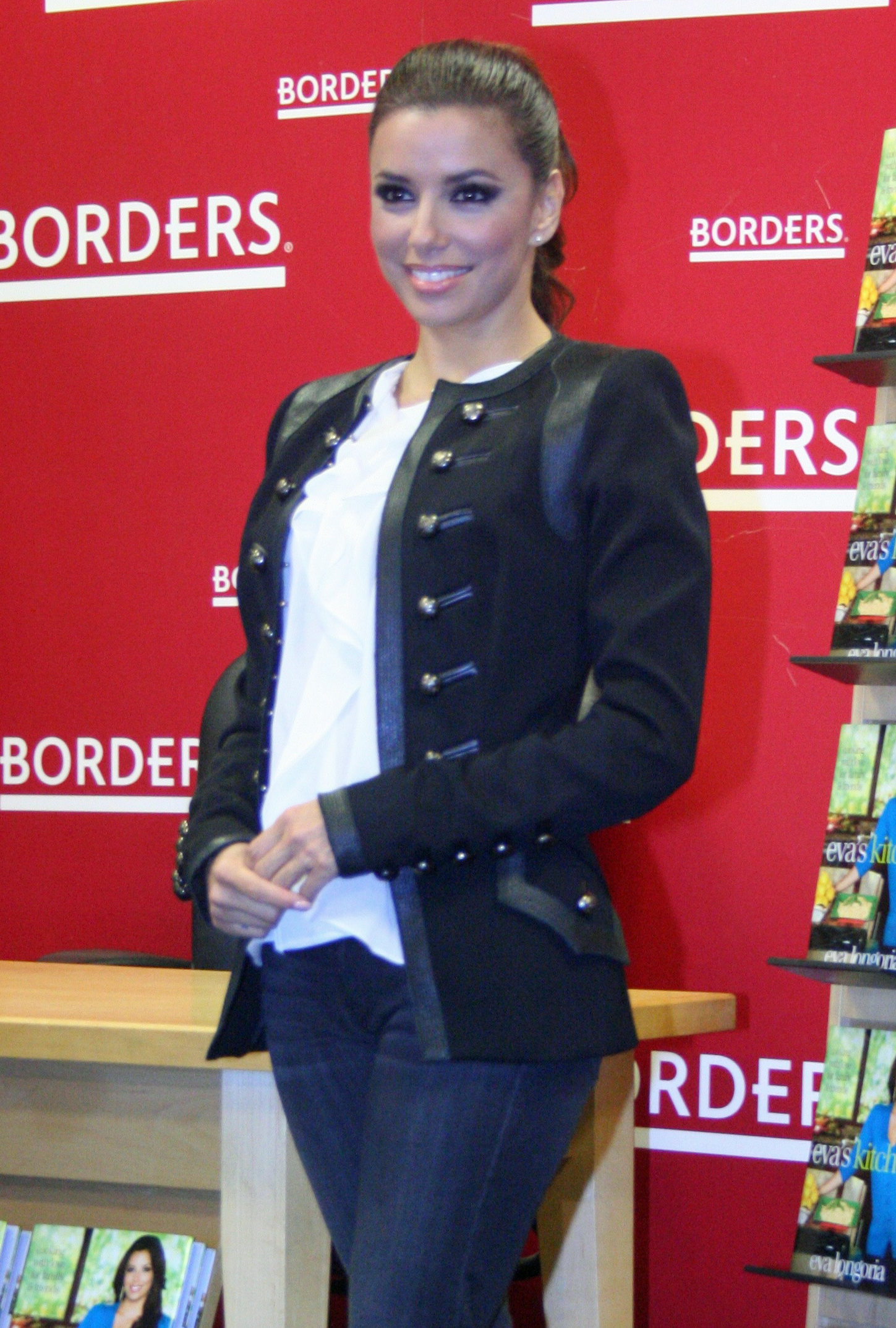
Longoria at a book signing for her book Eva's Kitchen: Cooking with Love for Family and Friends in April 2011

=== Business and endorsements ===
In March 2008, Longoria opened the restaurant Beso (which means "kiss" in Spanish) in Hollywood, along with partner and celebrity chef Todd English. The restaurant is located on Hollywood Boulevard, and is accompanied by Kiss, a Victorian-themed nightclub on the floor above. The Hollywood Beso was scheduled to be the focus of a pilot episode for a tentative reality series called Beso: Waiting on Fame, to air on VH1 in late 2010. In 2009, Longoria and various investor-partners opened a Beso restaurant, with a nightclub called Eve above it, in the Crystals retail and entertainment district of CityCenter in Las Vegas.

In 2011, the corporation Beso LLC, owner of the Vegas restaurant-and-nightclub venture, with listed assets of about $2.5 million and Longoria as a 32 percent shareholder, filed for Chapter 11 protection, entering bankruptcy proceedings, in order to restructure nearly $5.7 million in debt and other liabilities. On July 28, 2011, the U.S. Bankruptcy Court for Nevada ordered Longoria to appear in Las Vegas on August 20 in order to be examined about the bankrupt restaurant's finances.

In terms of food-related promotions, in 2012 and 2013, Longoria paired with Iron Chef Michael Symon for a promotion for PepsiCo's Lay's potato chips contest called "Do Us A Flavor". The promotion encourages consumers to submit new flavor ideas and fans to vote for their favorite on Facebook. The person who creates the winning flavor is awarded $1 million or one percent of chip flavor's net sales.

A week before production of the 2014 film John Wick was due to commence, Longoria provided $6 million in emergency funding according to a Milken Institute conversation with Kevin Yorn. She doubled her investment in 10 years and receives financial returns from the success of the film.

In 2015, Longoria announced that she had teamed up with sportswear manufacturer Sunrise Brands to create a women's apparel collection, set to launch Fall 2016.

In March 2017, Longoria launched her clothing line website on her official site. In December 2023, she was a guest narrator at Disney's Candlelight Processional at Walt Disney World.

After being approached by Natalie Portman, Longoria in 2020 joined the ownership group of Angel City FC of the National Women's Soccer League.

In 2021, Mexican football Club Necaxa received a high-profile investment from NX Football USA, LLC, which acquired a 50 percent ownership stake. Longoria was joined by a mix of investors, including former D.C. United MLS owners, executives from Swansea City A.F.C. and celebrities such as former German international footballer Mesut Özil, retired NBA star Shawn Marion, MLB pitcher Justin Verlander and model and actress Kate Upton. In April 2024, Necaxa's investment team acquired a 5 percent stake in Wrexham AFC, a Welsh football club revived by actors Rob McElhenney and Ryan Reynolds in 2020. As part of the reciprocal partnership, McElhenney and Reynolds also became minority stakeholders in Necaxa.

=== Philanthropy ===
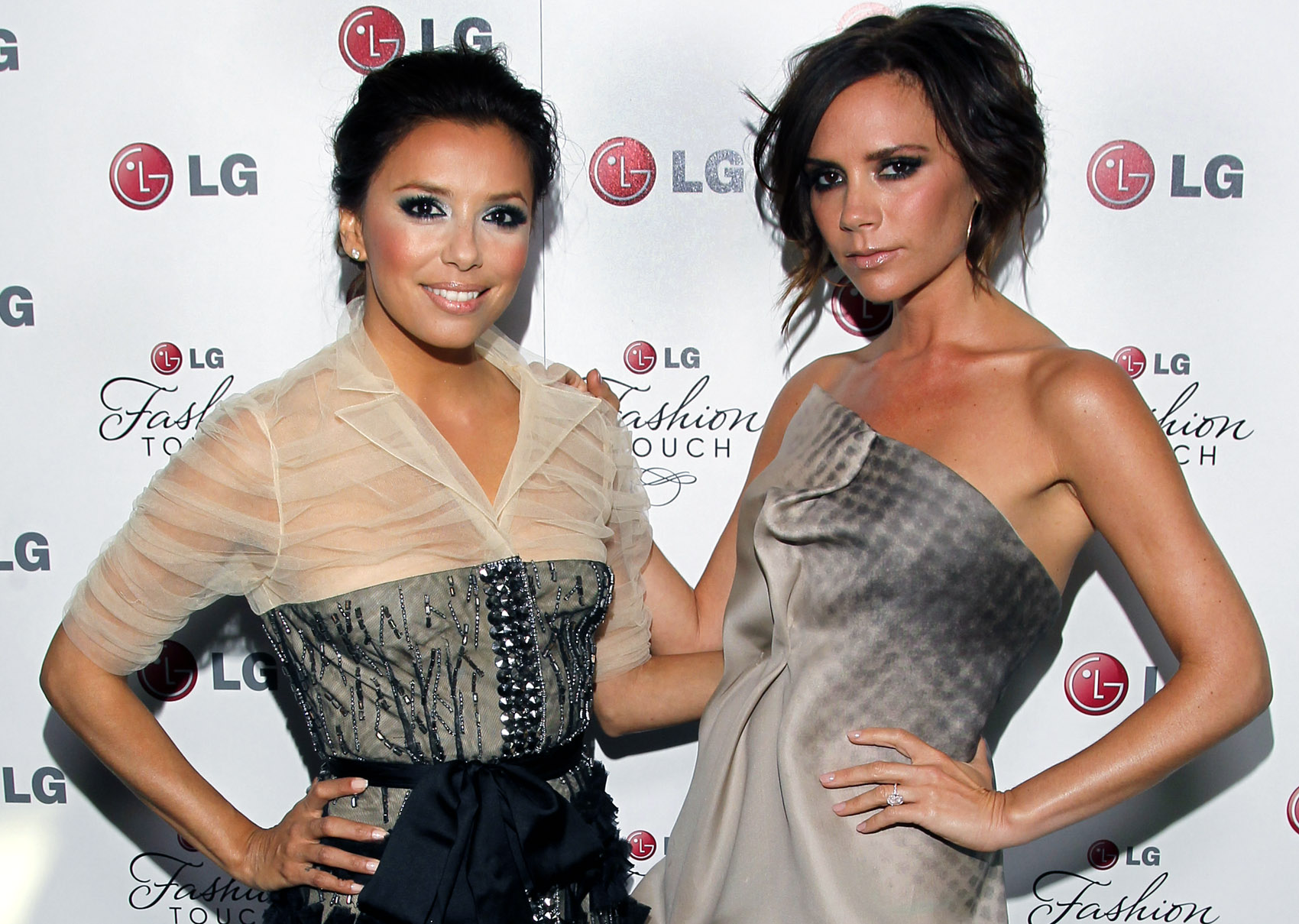
Longoria with Victoria Beckham in 2010

In 2006, Longoria founded Eva's Heroes, a charity which helps young adults with developmental disabilities. Based in San Antonio, Texas, it was inspired by her sister, who has intellectual disabilities.

Longoria is the national spokesperson for PADRES Contra El Cancer. She signed shoes for the Spirit of Women Red Shoe Celebrity Auction. She also supports the Clothes Off Our Back Foundation, OmniPeace, the National Center for Missing and Exploited Children, the National Stroke Association, Project HOME and St. Jude Children's Research Hospital. She is an executive producer of Shine Global Inc.'s documentary The Harvest, which focuses on the 500,000 child migrant farm workers in the U.S. and promotes awareness and support to enact the Children's Act for Responsible Employment (CARE Act).

Her other charity, the Eva Longoria Foundation, aims to close the education gap plaguing Latinas and to confront Latino poverty. She started: "The Eva Longoria Foundation supports programs which help Latinas excel in school and attend college. Additionally, we work to provide Latina entrepreneurs with career training, mentorship, capital and opportunity." The foundation offers nine-week "parent engagement" courses to help Latino parents; has a mentorship program and other activities for Latinas; and provides loans to Latina-owned businesses. It is co-funded by philanthropist Howard Buffett, son of investor Warren Buffett.

Longoria was named Philanthropist of the Year in 2009 by The Hollywood Reporter for her commitment to Latino causes and giving back to the community. She appeared on Fort Boyard in 2009, helping attract more than €20,000 for the Make-A-Wish Foundation.

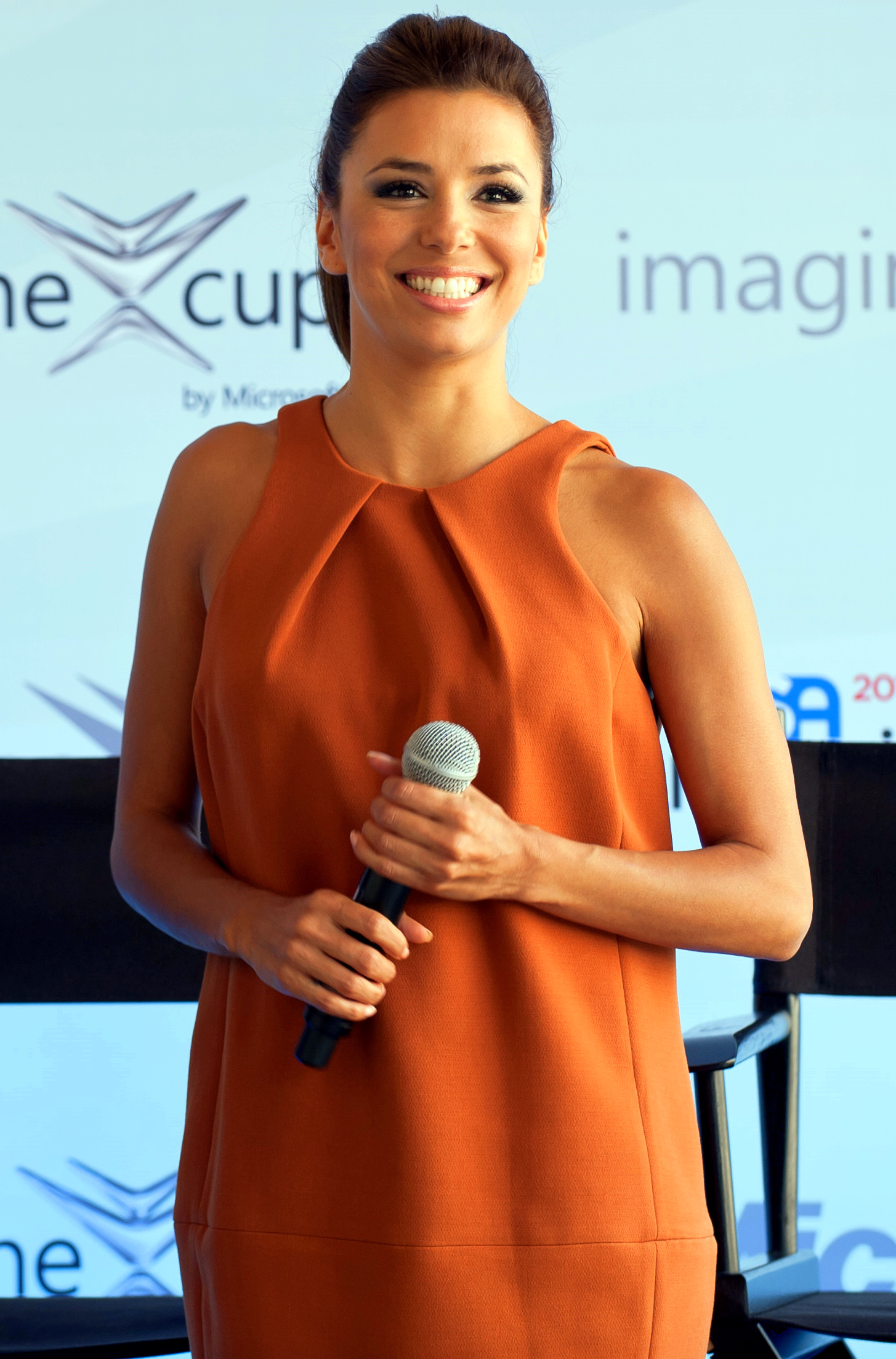
Longoria at Imagine Cup in 2011

In 2009, Longoria enrolled in a Master's program in Chicano studies and political science at Cal State University, Northridge. She said, "Because of my involvement with the NCLR and my charity work, I really wanted a better, more authentic understanding of what my community has gone through so I [could] help create change." She graduated with a master's degree in Chicano studies in May 2013.

In September 2009, Longoria was appointed to a bipartisan commission to establish a National Museum of the American Latino. In October 2012, she spoke at the McAfee Focus 2012 event, where the "theme of safety—beyond computers—emerged. Safety involving financial security, emotional security, and the other results from Longoria's philanthropic efforts."

In March 2017, UK-based company Richtopia included Longoria at No. 42 on its list of 200 Most Influential Philanthropists and Social Entrepreneurs Worldwide.

In spring of 2017, Longoria delivered the commencement address at Knox College in Galesburg, Illinois. She was awarded an honorary Doctor of Letters degree by that institution.

In July 2019, Longoria supported the Special Olympics Texas Summer Games hosted by Toyota Field and Morgan's Wonderland in San Antonio, Texas. In 2020 she assisted the San Antonio Food Bank with their COVID-relief efforts.

Combining her education advocacy with business in collaboration with Mott's Fruit Flavored Snacks, Longoria began promoting Mott's Snacks and Stories program which gives away bilingual children's books. "When you look at the statistics, 45% of children in the U.S. are living in book deserts with limited access to books," she stated on the subject.

In March 2024, Longoria was granted $50-million Courage and Civility Award by Jeff Bezos and his fiancée Lauren Sánchez in recognition of her charity work through the Eva Longoria Foundation supports programs for Latinas.

=== Politics ===
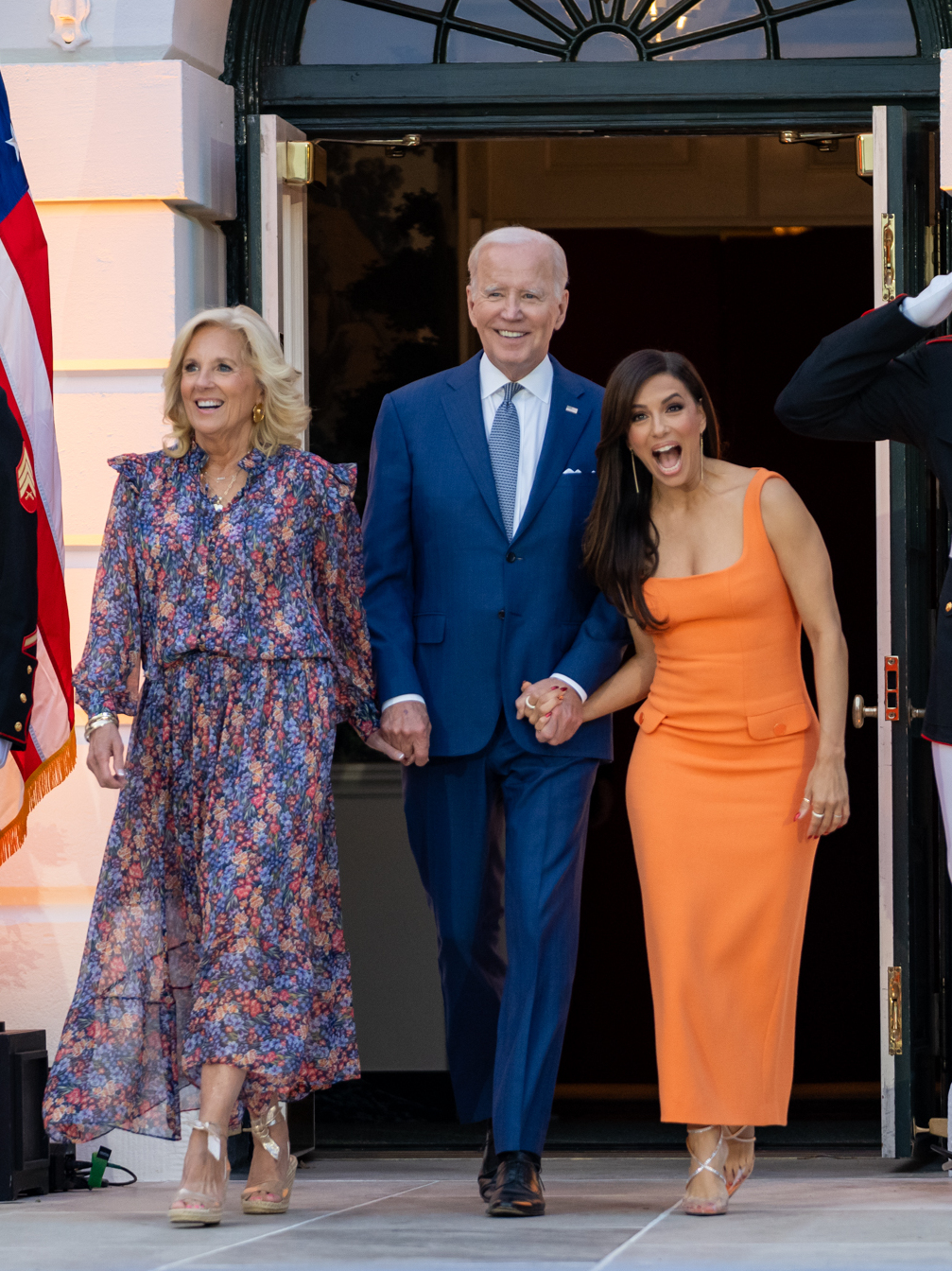
Longoria with President Joe Biden and First Lady Jill Biden in 2023

Longoria has a keen interest in immigration. She accompanied a border patrol in Arizona and has immersed herself in the issues to understand the Mexican and the U.S. points of view. She has described Arizona's SB 1070 immigration law as unconstitutional.

In 2012, Longoria was one of seven Californians named to the post of co-chair of Barack Obama's reelection campaign. On September 6, she spoke at the 2012 Democratic National Convention where she endorsed President Obama's reelection. In May 2014, she initiated the Latino Victory Project to raise funds for candidates and efforts to get out the vote. An executive producer of the documentaries The Harvest and Food Chains, she is a supporter of the Coalition of Immokalee Workers.

In 2014, Longoria endorsed Marianne Williamson for California's 33rd congressional district. In 2018, Longoria endorsed Beto O'Rourke for Senate against Senator Ted Cruz, as well as Colin Allred for Texas's 32nd congressional district against then-incumbent Rep. Pete Sessions.

Longoria spoke at the 2016 Democratic National Convention in Philadelphia on July 26, 2016. In August 2020, she hosted the first night of the 2020 Democratic National Convention, which was held remotely because of the COVID-19 pandemic. Longoria spoke at the 2024 Democratic National Convention in Chicago on August 22, 2024.

In preparation of Georgia's runoff elections, on January 2, 2021, Longoria participated in a VoteRiders textbanking event with America Ferrera to help educate Latina voters regarding the state's voter ID laws. Longoria was touted by Texas Monthly as a potential top Democratic contender in the 2024 United States Senate election in Texas, citing her past refusal to rule out a run for office in the future.

In 2023, following the October 7 attacks, Longoria condemned Hamas and expressed support for Israel. Amid her continued support for Israel's military actions in Gaza, she had a falling out with close friend Huda Kattan.

=== Writing ===
Longoria's first book, Eva's Kitchen: Cooking with Love for Family and Friends, was published in April 2011.

== Personal life ==
=== Marriages and children ===
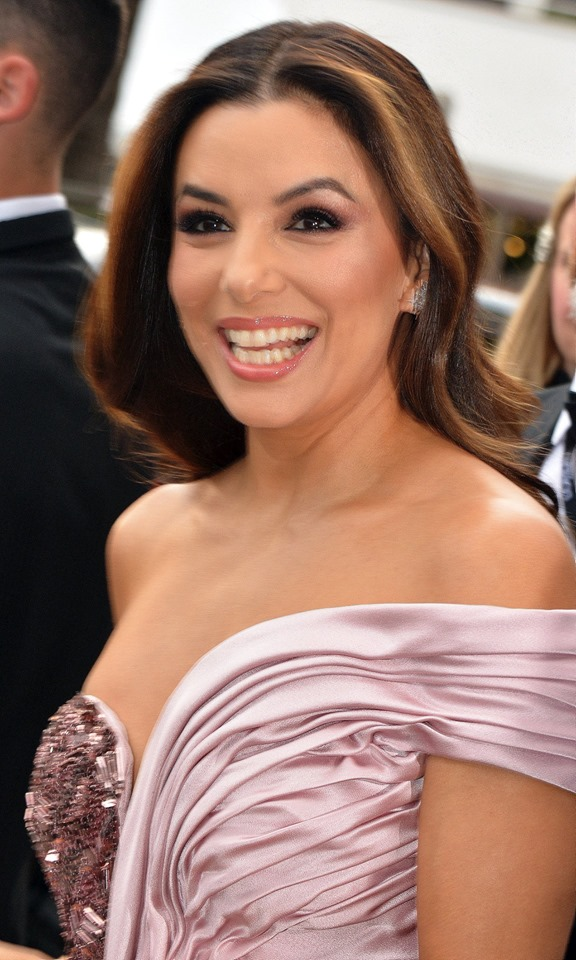
Longoria at the 2019 Cannes Film Festival

Longoria was married to actor Tyler Christopher, star of General Hospital, from 2002 to 2004.

Longoria met Tony Parker, then the point guard for the San Antonio Spurs, in November 2004. On November 30, 2006, they became engaged, and married in a civil service on July 6, 2007, at a Paris city hall. They had a Catholic wedding ceremony at the Saint-Germain l'Auxerrois Church in Paris on July 7, 2007.

In 2010, Longoria told her friend Mario Lopez that she had discovered hundreds of text messages from another woman on her husband's phone. Extra identified the other woman as Erin Barry, then-wife of Brent Barry, Parker's former teammate, and revealed that the Barrys were also divorcing. On November 17, 2010, Longoria filed for divorce from Parker in Los Angeles, citing "irreconcilable differences". In light of her divorce, she canceled her scheduled appearance at the 2010 American Music Awards. In her divorce petition, Longoria requested that her family name be restored, and sought spousal support from Parker. The couple had a prenuptial agreement signed in June 2007, a month before their wedding, and amended two years later in June 2009.

Two days later on November 19, Parker filed for divorce from Longoria in Bexar County, Texas, on the grounds of "discord or conflict of personalities", establishing a legal battle over where the case would be heard. Unlike Longoria's divorce petition, Parker's did not mention a prenuptial agreement and claimed that the parties would "enter into an agreement for the division of their estate". The divorce was finalized in Texas on January 28, 2011, the same day Longoria's lawyer filed papers to dismiss her Los Angeles petition. Longoria later said, "I didn't realize it at the time with Tony, but I had become my own version of a desperate housewife."

On December 13, 2015, Longoria reported her engagement to Mexican businessman José Antonio "Pepe" Bastón Patiño, then the president of Televisa, the largest media company in Latin America. They met on a blind date arranged by a mutual friend in Mexico City; at the time, Bastón did not know who Longoria was, and initially declined the invitation to meet her because of his busy schedule. They would get married in Mexico on May 21, 2016.

On December 19, 2017, it was reported that Longoria was pregnant with her first child. She gave birth to a son in June 2018.

In November 2024, she revealed that she had moved out of the United States with her family, and she said that they split their time between Mexico and Spain.

=== Ancestry ===
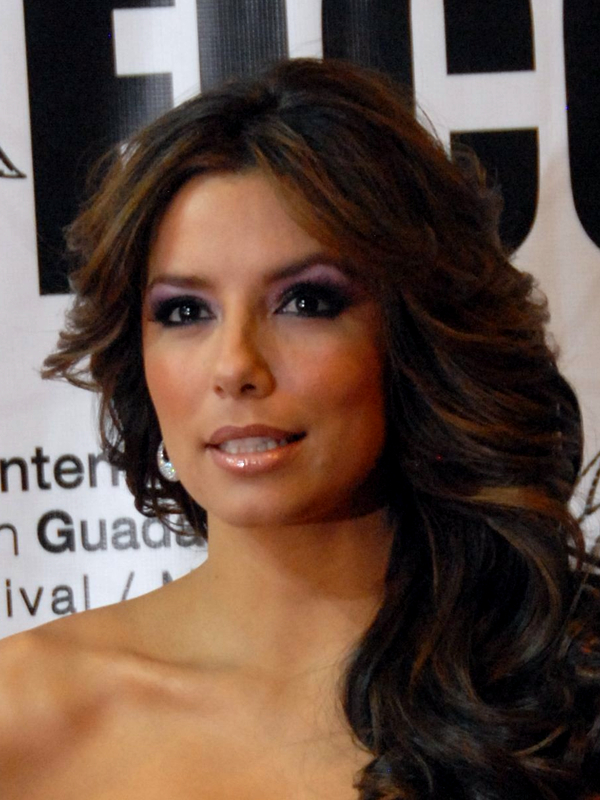
Longoria in 2009 at the Guadalajara International Film Festival

According to research done in 2010 by Harvard professor and Faces of America host Henry Louis Gates Jr., Longoria's oldest identifiable Spanish immigrant ancestor is her ninth great-grandfather, Lorenzo Suárez de Longoria (b. Oviedo, 1592), who was a colonist of the Viceroyalty of New Spain in 1603. His family was based in a small village called Llongoria, Belmonte de Miranda, Asturias, Spain. Longoria is the Castillanized form of this Asturian-language surname.

In 1767, her seventh great-grandfather received almost 4,000 acres (16 km^{2}) of land along the Rio Grande in a land grant from King Charles III of Spain. The family retained this land for more than a century. After the US-Mexican border was moved southwards in the aftermath of the Mexican–American War, the land ended up on the American side of the border. Her family had to deal with the influx of United States settlers following the Mexican–American War and the American Civil War.

According to DNA testing, Longoria's overall genetic ancestry is 70% European, 27% Indigenous American, and 3% African. A computer analysis of the DNA results of Gates's dozen guests showed that Longoria has the same genetic haplogroup as cellist Yo-Yo Ma, who is of Chinese heritage. As women have two X chromosomes and no Y chromosome, Longoria did not inherit her father's Y-DNA, but she did inherit her mother's mitochondrial DNA (genetic information passed from mother to child). Longoria's mtDNA belongs to the Haplogroup A2, making her a direct descendant of a Native American woman, a Mayan from the territory of Mexico long before it was Mexico. Her ancestors include many other Maya on both sides of her family.

Longoria identifies as a "Texican"—a Mexican-American Texan.

In 2010, Longoria appeared on an episode of Dr. Henry Louis Gates genealogy series “Faces of America” where she discovered she is related to actress Meryl Streep.

== Awards and nominations ==
Award	Year	Category	Work	Result	Ref.
ALMA Awards	2002	Outstanding Actress in a Daytime Drama	The Young and the Restless	Won	
ALMA Awards	2006	Person of the Year	Herself	Won	
ALMA Awards	2009	Outstanding Actress in Television - Comedy	Desperate Housewives	Nominated	
ALMA Awards	2012	Outstanding Movie Actress - Drama/Adventure	Cristiada	Nominated	
ALMA Awards	2018	Special Achievement in Film	Herself	Won	
Bambi Awards	2005	TV Series International Award	Desperate Housewives	Won	
Celebration of Cinema and Television	2023	Breakthrough Director – Film	Flamin' Hot	Won	
Daytime Emmy Awards	2021	Outstanding Directing Team for a Daytime Fiction Program	Ashley Garcia: Genius in Love	Nominated	
Golden Globe Awards	2006	Best Actress – Television Series Musical or Comedy	Desperate Housewives	Nominated	
Imagen Awards	2005	Best Actress - Television	Desperate Housewives	Nominated	
Imagen Awards	2007	Best Actress - Television	Desperate Housewives	Nominated	
Imagen Awards	2012	Best Actress - Film	Without Men	Nominated	
Imagen Awards	2016	Best Actress - Television	Telenovela	Nominated	
Imagen Awards	2017	Best Actress - Television	Lowriders	Nominated	
Imagen Awards	2018	Best Actress - Film	Overboard	Won	
Imagen Awards	2023	Best Feature Film	Flamin' Hot	Won	
Imagen Awards	2023	Best Director	Flamin' Hot	Won	
Iris Awards	2025	Best Actress	Land of Women	Nominated	
Miami Film Festival	2022	Best Documentary	La Guerra Civil	Nominated	
Screen Actors Guild Awards	2005	Outstanding Performance by an Ensemble in a Comedy Series	Desperate Housewives	Won	
Screen Actors Guild Awards	2006	Outstanding Performance by an Ensemble in a Comedy Series	Desperate Housewives	Won	
Screen Actors Guild Awards	2007	Outstanding Performance by an Ensemble in a Comedy Series	Desperate Housewives	Nominated	
Screen Actors Guild Awards	2008	Outstanding Performance by an Ensemble in a Comedy Series	Desperate Housewives	Nominated	
Screen Actors Guild Awards	2009	Outstanding Performance by an Ensemble in a Comedy Series	Desperate Housewives	Nominated	
Screen Actors Guild Awards	2025	Outstanding Performance by an Ensemble in a Comedy Series	Only Murders in the Building	Won	
Palm Springs International Film Festival	2023	Directors to Watch Award	Flamin' Hot	Won	
People's Choice Awards	2005	Favorite New TV Drama	Desperate Housewives	Won	
People's Choice Awards	2007	Favorite Female TV Star	Desperate Housewives	Won	
People's Choice Awards	2011	Favorite TV Comedy Actress	Desperate Housewives	Nominated	
People's Choice Awards	2012	Favorite TV Drama Actress	Desperate Housewives	Nominated	
Teen Choice Awards	2005	Choice Breakout Performance – Female	Desperate Housewives	Won	
Teen Choice Awards	2005	Choice TV Actress: Comedy	Desperate Housewives	Nominated	
Teen Choice Awards	2007	Choice TV Actress: Comedy	Desperate Housewives	Nominated	
Teen Choice Awards	2009	Choice TV Actress: Comedy	Desperate Housewives	Nominated	
