= Walter Kiernan =

American journalist, author and television game show host

Walter J. Kiernan
- Born: January 24, 1902; New Haven, Connecticut, U.S.
- Died: January 8, 1978 (aged 75); Daytona Beach, Florida, U.S.
- Occupations: Journalist, author, game show host
- Years active: 1920s–1968
- Spouse: Helen Hastings

Walter J. Kiernan (January 24, 1902 – January 8, 1978) was an American radio, television, and print journalist and author, as well as television game show host during the early days of the medium.

== Early years ==
Kiernan was born on January 24, 1902, in New Haven, Connecticut, and grew up there.

== Career ==
Kiernan began his career as a journalist in New Haven in 1920 as a reporter for the New Haven (Conn.) Union. He was a writer and editor of the New Haven Register from 1926 to 1928. He wrote for The Saturday Evening Post and started The Town Crier newspaper of West Haven, Connecticut in 1930.

Kiernan was an Associated Press (AP) correspondent before he joined the International News Service (INS) as manager of its Hartford bureau in 1935. In 1937 INS transferred him to New York as a feature writer. He served until 1943 as a roving reporter and special assignment writer for INS, during which he spent a remarkable New Year's Eve with British Prime Minister Winston Churchill on a train ride from the United States to Canada during World War II.

While a staff correspondent for the INS, Kiernan wrote the syndicated column Manhattan Side Streets which appeared in papers in Ohio, Pennsylvania, Massachusetts, Indiana and Texas. His column "One Man's Opinion" was also nationally syndicated by INS, and became a daily radio program for ABC. In addition to his fascinating train ride with Winston Churchill, he had previously covered Douglas "Wrong Way" Corrigan's return to New York, as well as the visit of King George VI and Queen Elizabeth during their royal tour of Canada in 1939. He also wrote a "Broadway" column in the Dallas Times Herald.

In 1942, he co-authored with another noted columnist, Damon Runyon, The Life Story of Captain Eddie Rickenbacker As heard at The Paley Center for Media (formerly The Museum of Television and Radio), Kiernan's animated reporting and analysis of V-E Day in 1945 remains one of the era's most stirring historical recordings. Walter Kiernan eventually hosted his own news analysis program, Kiernan's Korner, which ran throughout 1948 for ABC Radio. On ABC Radio in 1948 he had a chat program called That Reminds Me, with former New Jersey Governor Harold Hoffman and "Uncle Jim" Harkins. He had an ABC radio chat show in 1951 called Family Circle. Among his guests was Winston Churchill's actress daughter Sarah.

== Radio and television ==
Kiernan began a news program on WJZ radio in New York City in 1943. He hosted several daytime chat and commentary programs on both radio and television throughout the late 1940s and early 1950s, including Kiernan's Corner (1948), Sparring Partners (1949), What's the Story (1951-1953), Who Said That? (1951-1954), I've Got a Secret (1952), Who's the Boss? (1954), and history show Stroke of Fate (1952–1953). After the relative success of Stroke of Fate, he began co-hosting NBC Radio's long-running news magazine, Monitor. Kiernan co-hosted Monitor from 1955 to 1960, when the program's format was dramatically changed.

A familiar baritone voice on New York radio for many years, Kiernan's commentary program on WOR Radio's, One Man's Opinion, was heard daily, in addition to co-anchoring WOR-TV's local evening news. He was also a past president of the Catholic Actors Guild in New York. In more national issues he was an early outspoken critic of United States policy in Vietnam, raising objections as early as 1965, and later covering the Paris peace talks.

Kiernan was most remembered in political circles for his reporting of every national political convention from 1940 through 1972. Kiernan retired from journalism after covering the 1968 Republican Convention in Miami.

== Personal life and death ==
Kiernan was married to the former Helen Hastings at the time of his death. He had three sons. He died on January 8, 1978, in Daytona Beach, Florida, aged 75.
