= It's Alec Templeton Time =

- Presented by: Alec Templeton
- Country of origin: United States

Production
- Running time: 30 minutes

Original release
- Network: DuMont
- Release: June 3 – August 26, 1955

It's Alec Templeton Time is an American television program broadcast on the now-defunct DuMont Television Network June 3, 1955 - August 26, 1955. It was a musical program hosted by blind satirist and musician Alec Templeton. The program, produced and distributed by DuMont, aired on Friday nights on most DuMont affiliates. Pianist Templeton was accompanied by a trio playing bass viol, drums, and guitar.

It's Alec Templeton Time has the distinction of being one of the last programs to air on the dying DuMont Television Network, along with Have a Heart (ended June 14, 1955), What's the Story (ended September 23, 1955) and Boxing from St. Nicholas Arena (ended August 6, 1956). The struggling network was already beginning to shut down network operations before It's Alec Templeton Time even aired its first episode, and Paramount Pictures would take control of DuMont during the summer; as a result, the series' run was brief, and did not last past the summer months.

== Episode status ==
As is the case with most DuMont programs, nothing remains of the series today.

== See also ==
- List of programs broadcast by the DuMont Television Network
- List of surviving DuMont Television Network broadcasts

== Bibliography ==
- David Weinstein, The Forgotten Network: DuMont and the Birth of American Television (Philadelphia: Temple University Press, 2004) ISBN 1-59213-245-6
