= Harriet Van Horne =

American newspaper columnist and critic (1920–1998)

- Born: May 17, 1920; Syracuse, New York, U.S.
- Died: January 15, 1998 (aged 77); Manhattan, New York City, U.S.
- Education: University of Rochester
- Occupation: Newspaper columnist
- Spouse: David Lowe (m. 1957; died 1965)

Harriet Van Horne (May 17, 1920 – January 15, 1998) was an American newspaper columnist and radio and television critic. She was a writer for many years at the New York World-Telegram and its successors.

== Life and career ==
Harriet Van Horne was born on May 17, 1920, in Syracuse, New York. She graduated from high school in Newark, New York, and from the College for Women of the University of Rochester in 1940.

During the 1940s and 1950s, she appeared frequently on television as a celebrity panelist. Van Horne was a regular on NBC's popular series Leave It to the Girls from 1949 to 1954. She was also a regular on the DuMont Television Network's quiz show What's the Story from 1952 to 1955.

She was a syndicated columnist, appearing in the New York Post and other newspapers around the country. In 1960, she covered the Nixon-Kennedy debates as a television critic for the Scripps-Howard newspaper chain. Her work landed her on the master list of Nixon political opponents.

Van Horne was also a member of the Peabody Awards Board of Jurors from 1958 to 1967.

Van Horne had to deal with prevailing sexism against female journalists. Ray Erwin of Editor & Publisher described syndicated columnist Van Horne as "a dainty, blue-eyed blonde with a sweet-voiced feminine manner-and a harpoon in her typewriter." In 1972, she published the essay collection Never Go Anywhere Without a Pencil.

Her reporting also landed her on President Nixon's master list of Nixon political opponents.

According to Van Horne, "I used to enjoy radio until I realised that by listening to it, I had become almost as sterile and unimaginative as the programs themselves." She said that TV review was arduous work, commenting "Imagine having to review 'I Love Lucy' 20 times or 'Gunsmoke' 10 times." In her later years, she said "For all my criticism, I almost enjoyed 'Playhouse 90' compared to the canned shows from Universal or all that cowboy and cop nonsense."

Van Horne continued writing her newspaper column almost up to her death, eventually replacing TV reviews with any random subject that crossed her mind. While her columns remained popular with readers, few newspapers carried them due to the impossibility of categorization.

== Personal life and death ==
Van Horne married her husband, David Lowe, a television producer, in 1957. He died in 1965. She died of breast cancer at New York Hospital in Manhattan on January 15, 1998, at the age of 77.
