= Love Story (1973 TV series) =

- Genre: Drama anthology
- Opening theme: "(Where Do I Begin?) Love Story"
- Composer: Francis Lai
- Country of origin: United States
- Original language: English
- No. of seasons: 1
- No. of episodes: 12

Production
- Running time: 60 minutes
- Production company: Paramount Television

Original release
- Network: NBC
- Release: October 3, 1973 – January 2, 1974

Love Story is an American drama anthology television series focused on stories of romance. It aired from October 3, 1973, to January 2, 1974, on NBC.

Love Story was the second American television series of the name, the first having been the DuMont Television Network's anthology series Love Story, which aired in 1954.

== Synopsis ==
Each episode of Love Story told a story of romance and was an independent drama, unrelated to any other episode. The episodes were set in various locations around the United States, and told a wide variety of stories, each about problems faced by a heterosexual couple in love.

== Cast ==
As an anthology series, Love Story had no regular cast. Each episode had a different cast as noted in the episodes list below.

== Production ==
In 1970, the novel Love Story; the movie based on the novel, also called Love Story; and the movie's theme song, "Where Do I Begin," all were major hits. Hoping to capitalize on this success, NBC aired the television series Love Story three years later. Although the show shared its name with the novel and movie and used "Where Do I Begin" as its theme song, it otherwise was completely unrelated to the novel and movie, each of its episodes being an entirely original story with an entirely different cast. Generally, less well-known actors and actresses appeared in the show. Episode directors included Michael Landon and Donald Wrye. Writers included Landon and Elinor Karpf.

== Broadcast history ==
Love Story premiered on NBC on October 3, 1973. It faced tough competition in its time slot from CBS's Kojak, and sharing its title and theme song with the movie Love Story did not help it to garner much of an audience, given that it had no characters or storylines in common with either the novel or the movie. With low ratings, it was cancelled after the broadcast of its 12th episode on January 2, 1974. The show aired at 10:00 p.m. on Wednesday throughout its run. It ranked 63rd out of 80 shows that season, with a 14.2 rating.

== Episodes ==
No.	Title	Original release date
1	"Love Came Laughing"	October 3, 1973
A young man falls in love with an unmarried pregnant woman who was abandoned by the father of her unborn child. Michael Brandon, Bonnie Bedelia, and Eileen Heckart star.
2	"All My Tomorrows"	October 10, 1973
A music teacher who is also an aspiring concert pianist marries a dying woman. Robert Foxworth, Susan Anspach, Anne Baxter, and Barnard Hughes star.
3	"The Roller Coaster Stops Here"	October 24, 1973
A restless man who is bored with his marriage risks his home, family, and future when he falls in love with an unconventional woman. Don Murray, Barbara Hershey, and Louise Lasser star.
4	"The Cardboard House"	October 31, 1973
A very organized and tidy secretary and a devil-may-care charmer become romantically involved and try to change each other. Samantha Eggar, Vic Morrow, and Robert Earnhardt star.
5	"Mirabelle's Summer"	November 7, 1973
A young woman is torn between her love for her fiance and her growing fondness for a young disabled man. Pamela Franklin, David Doyle, Martin Sheen, Marcia Strassman and David Huffman star.
6	"The Soft, Kind Brush"	November 21, 1973
College sweethearts reunite and find that they are still powerfully attracted to one another, despite being married to other people. James Farentino, Trish Van Devere, and Lynette Metty star.
7	"Beginner's Luck"	November 28, 1973
Two college students fall in love and explore the new moral standards of college life in the early 1970s. Jan Smithers, Janet Leigh, and Kurt Russell star.
8	"When the Girls Came Out to Play"	December 5, 1973
A womanizing bachelor resides in a swinging singles apartment complex. Frank Langella, Victoria Principal, and Valerie Perrine star.
9	"Joie"	December 12, 1973
An artistically gifted, mentally challenged young man falls in love with a dedicated teacher who clashes with his overprotective mother. Kim Darby, John David Carson, and Sada Thompson star.
10	"The Youngest Lovers"	December 19, 1973
Two 12-year-olds from broken homes fall in love. Jodie Foster, Diane Baker, and Susan Oliver star.
11	"A Glow of Dying Embers"	December 26, 1973
A man who was presumed killed in the Vietnam War returns home to the United States after being held as a prisoner-of-war in North Vietnam and finds that his wife is now happily remarried to another man. Tina Andrews, Ed Bernard, and Clifton Davis star.
12	"Time for Love"	January 2, 1974
An old man's fondness for his great-grandson's pregnant girlfriend complicates the couple's relationship. Bruce Davison, Joan Pringle, and Dean Jagger star.
