= Have a Heart (game show) =

- Starring: John Reed King (host)
- Country of origin: United States

Production
- Running time: 30 minutes

Original release
- Network: DuMont
- Release: May 3 – June 14, 1955

Have a Heart is a game show that was broadcast on the DuMont Television Network. The show ran from May 3, 1955, to June 14, 1955, and was hosted by John Reed King.

The program's format pitted two four-person teams from different places against each other. All prize money was donated to charity.

Have a Heart was one of the last shows broadcast on the DuMont network, along with It's Alec Templeton Time (ended August 26, 1955), What's the Story (ended September 23, 1955), and Boxing From St. Nicholas Arena (ended August 6, 1956).

== Episode status ==
As with most DuMont series, no episodes are known to survive.

== See also ==
- List of programs broadcast by the DuMont Television Network
- List of surviving DuMont Television Network broadcasts

== Bibliography ==
- David Weinstein, The Forgotten Network: DuMont and the Birth of American Television (Philadelphia: Temple University Press, 2004) ISBN 1-59213-245-6
- Tim Brooks and Earle Marsh, The Complete Directory to Prime Time Network TV Shows, Third edition (New York: Ballantine Books, 1964) ISBN 0-345-31864-1
