= Let's See (game show) =

- Presented by: John Reed King
- Country of origin: United States
- Original language: English

Production
- Production locations: Atlantic City Convention Hall, Atlantic City
- Running time: 30 minutes

Original release
- Network: ABC
- Release: July 14 – August 25, 1955

Let's See is an American game show that aired on the ABC Network on Thursday nights from July 14, 1955 to August 25, 1955.

== Premise ==
Filmed at Atlantic City Convention Hall in Atlantic City, New Jersey, the series featured panelists attempting to discover through indirect questions what attractions contestants had seen in Atlantic City. The program was sponsored by the Atlantic City Chamber of Commerce.
