= Who Said That? =

American game show on radio and TV

- Genre: Game show
- Presented by: Robert Trout; Walter Kiernan; John Charles Daly; John Cameron Swayze
- Starring: H. V. Kaltenborn; Boris Karloff; Peggy Ann Garner; Deems Taylor; Frank Conniff; Dagmar
- Country of origin: United States
- Original language: English
- No. of seasons: 7 (3 partial seasons)

Production
- Camera setup: Multi-camera
- Running time: 23-25 minutes

Original release
- Network: Radio
- Release: October 1, 1948 – 1948
- Network: NBC
- Release: January 1949 – 1949
- Release: January 1950 – July 19, 1954
- Network: ABC
- Release: February 2 – July 26, 1955

Who Said That? is a 1948–55 NBC game show that ran on radio and television, in which a panel of celebrities attempted to determine the speaker of a quotation from recent news reports.

== Radio ==
Robert Trout was the moderator when the radio version began on July 2, 1948. Panelists included H. V. Kaltenborn, Robert Ruark, Leland Stowe, and John Swayze. Peter Roberts was the announcer.

=== Production ===
Don Gillis was the director, with Fred and Dorothy Friendly as editors. The program was broadcast at 8:30 p.m. on Fridays, and it was sustaining. NBC planned to cancel the program in the fall of 1948, but it was continued "at the instance of the network's affiliates". The continuation was accompanied by a scheduling change as the show was moved to noon Eastern Time on Sundays.

=== Critical response ===
The trade publication Variety called the 1948 radio version "a refreshing departure from run-of-the-mill entertainment". It commended Trout's work as moderator, saying his "easy, offhand manner in presiding lent a warmly informal atmosphere to the proceedings" and noting his handy use of ad-libs.

== Television ==
One televised version of Who Said That? was broadcast on NBC as early as January 1949. Trout was the master of ceremonies, and John Cameron Swayze was the permanent panel member. Another TV version ran on NBC from January 1950 to July 19, 1954, with Walter Kiernan as emcee. It began a run on ABC on February 2, 1955. John Daly moderated, and Bob Considine was the permanent panelist. Each episode also featured three guest panelists.

=== Production ===
Ann Gillis produced the ABC-TV version, with Eddie Nugent as the director. It originated from WABC-TV in New York City. W. A Sheaffer Pen Company was the sponsor.

=== Critical response ===
A review of the TV version in Variety said that the show's format created "an extreme case of repetitiveness that's likely to break down into monotony at any given moment." It added that the show's future success would depend on the guest panelists for each episode.
