= David Lowe (producer) =

David Lowe (28 February 1913 – 25 September 1965) was an American television producer. He is best known for his work on CBS Reports (including the 1960 documentary Harvest of Shame) and Do You Trust Your Wife.

Lowe died of a heart attack at the New York Friars' Club in Manhattan. His wife was journalist Harriet Van Horne.
