= Veterans Cannabis Analysis, Research, and Effectiveness Act =

Proposed legislation in the United States

Veterans CARE Act
- Long title: To direct the Secretary of Veterans Affairs to conduct and support research on the efficacy and safety of medicinal cannabis, and for other purposes.
- Enacted by: the 118th United States Congress

Legislative history
- Introduced in the House of Representatives as H.R. 3584 by Mariannette Miller-Meeks (R–IA) on May 22, 2023; Committee consideration by House Veterans' Affairs

The Veterans Cannabis Analysis, Research, and Effectiveness (CARE) Act was introduced in the 117th U.S. Congress in 2021 as H.R. 2932 and in the 118th Congress as H.R. 3584 in 2023.

== Provisions ==
The bill requires the Department of Veterans Affairs (VA) to conduct and support research on the efficacy and safety of certain forms of cannabis. Including with different THC and CBD concentrations and cannabis delivery for veterans enrolled in the VA health care system and diagnosed with conditions such as chronic pain or post-traumatic stress disorder (PTSD).

== Legislative history ==
The 2021 bill was announced in April and advanced to committees but did not reach the floor.

The 2023 bill was introduced by Representative Mariannette Miller-Meeks (R‑IA 1st) in May, 2023. In January 2024 the bill gained two bipartisan cosponsors: Representative David Joyce (R‑OH 14th) and Delegate Eleanor H. Norton (D‑DC).

The United States House Veterans' Affairs Subcommittee on Health held hearings on the bill on March 21, 2024. At the hearings, the Veterans Administration (VA) supported the bill with amendments to reject administrative provisions related with reporting of psychedelics.
