= What's the Story =

- Presented by: Walter Raney (1951); Walter Kiernan (1951-1953); Al Capp (1953); John McCaffery (1953-1955)
- Starring: Harriet Van Horne; Jimmy Cannon; Robert Sullivan; Bosley Crowther; Porthos The Dog
- Country of origin: United States
- No. of seasons: 4

Production
- Running time: 25 mins.

Original release
- Network: DuMont
- Release: June 25, 1951 – September 23, 1955

What's the Story is an American television panel show broadcast on the DuMont Television Network from July 25, 1951, to September 23, 1955, and aired in eleven different timeslots.

Originally hosted by Walter Raney, he was replaced in September 1951 by Walter Kiernan, who hosted until June 20, 1953. Al Capp took over from the following week until sometime in the Fall, when John McCaffery took the reins through the show’s end in 1955.

The series is most notable for being the last regular series to air on the DuMont network, after the game show Have a Heart (ended June 14, 1955) and It's Alec Templeton Time (ended August 26, 1955). After the finale of What's the Story on September 23, DuMont aired only a few sporting events and ceased broadcasting altogether with the final broadcast of Boxing from St. Nicholas Arena on August 6, 1956.

== Gameplay ==
A panel of well-known newspaper columnists and/or other celebrities were asked to try to identify famous events from clues given by the moderator and his assistants. Among the regular panelists were Robert Sullivan of the New York Daily News, Jimmy Cannon of the New York Post, and Harriet Van Horne of the New York World-Telegram. Sullivan later co-hosted the DuMont series Meet the Boss (1952–53).

== Episode status ==
Although many DuMont shows survive at the UCLA Film and Television Archive, the Paley Center for Media, and Chicago’s Museum of Broadcast Communications, there are no copies of What’s the Story at any of these archives.

Only one episode is known to exist, and is held in the J. Fred MacDonald collection at the Library of Congress. This episode (from January 14, 1954) features McCaffery, network founder Allen B. DuMont, and television pioneer Thomas T. Goldsmith discussing the future of color television.

== See also ==
- List of programs broadcast by the DuMont Television Network
- List of surviving DuMont Television Network broadcasts

== Bibliography ==
- David Weinstein, The Forgotten Network: DuMont and the Birth of American Television (Philadelphia: Temple University Press, 2004) ISBN 1-59213-245-6
- Alex McNeil, Total Television, Fourth edition (New York: Penguin Books, 1980) ISBN 0-14-024916-8
- Tim Brooks and Earle Marsh, The Complete Directory to Prime Time Network TV Shows, Third edition (New York: Ballantine Books, 1964) ISBN 0-345-31864-1
