= The Dark Side of Chocolate =

- Directed by: Miki Mistrati; U. Roberto Romano
- Produced by: Helle Faber
- Edited by: Andreas Birch Eriksen
- Music by: Jonas Colstrup
- Production companies: Bastard Film & TV
- Release date: 16 March 2010
- Country: Denmark
- Languages: English; German; French

The Dark Side of Chocolate is a 2010 documentary film about the exploitation and slavetrading of African children to harvest chocolate still occurring nearly ten years after the cocoa industry pledged to end it.

== Background ==
Cocoa plantations in Ghana and the Ivory Coast provide 80% of the world's chocolate, according to CorpWatch. Chocolate producers around the world have been pressured to “verify that their chocolate is not the product of child labor or slavery.”

In 2000, BBC aired Slavery: A Global Investigation which brought the issue of child labor in the cocoa industry to light.

In 2001, the Chocolate Manufacturers Association and its members signed a document that prohibited child trafficking and labor in the cocoa industry after 2008. Despite this effort, numerous children are still forced to work on cocoa plantations in Africa.

In 2009, Mars and Cadbury joined the Rainforest Alliance to fight against child labor. By 2020, these major chocolate manufacturers hoped to completely eradicate child labor on any plantations from which they purchase their cocoa. As of 2019, there are still 1.56 million child laborers in Ghana and the Ivory Coast.

== Production ==
The Dark Side of Chocolate was directed by Danish journalist, lawyer and writer Miki Mistrati who investigated the use of child labor and trafficked children in chocolate production. It was filmed by U. Roberto Romano and produced by Helle Faber.

The filming started in Germany, where Mistrati asked vendors where their chocolate comes from. They then flew to Mali, where many of the children are from. Next, they explored the Ivory Coast, Ghana and Nigeria where the cocoa plantations are located. The film ends in Switzerland where both the International Labour Organization (ILO) and the Nestle headquarters are located.

Much of the footage in this documentary is recorded using a secret camera, but some of the material was deleted by the authorities.

The documentary was released in 2010, first in Denmark, and later in Sweden, Ireland, Belgium, and Norway.

== Synopsis ==
In 2001, the Chocolate Manufacturers Association formed an action plan entitled the Harkin–Engel Protocol, an agreement that was signed by the major chocolate companies almost 10 years before the film was made, aimed at ending child trafficking and slave labor in the cocoa industry.

The documentary starts in Cologne, Germany where Mistrati asks several chocolate company representatives whether they are aware of child labour in cocoa farms. In Mali, the film shows that children, having been promised paid work, are taken to towns near the border such as Zégoua, from where another trafficker transports the children over the border on a dirt-bike. Then they are left with a third trafficker who sells the children to farmers for a starting price of 230 Euros each.

The children, ranging in age from 10 to 15, are forced to do hard and often hazardous labor, are often beaten, and according to the film's narrator most are never paid. The narrator also claims that most of them stay with the plantation until they die, never seeing their families again. No documentary evidence is shown to support the claims that the children are not paid or that they are made to work until they die. The Harkin-Engel Protocol promised to end the use of child labour.

When confronted with this issue, corporate representatives denied all rumors of child labor and trafficking, but the investigations of the filmmakers brought to light the continued widespread use of trafficked child slaves on cocoa plantations.

Nestlé and other companies declined an invitation to watch the film and to answer questions. In response, Mistrati set up a large screen next to Nestlé’s headquarters in Switzerland, forcing employees to catch a glimpse of child labor in the cocoa industry.

As a closing edit window to the film, during the credits roll, we see the local police arrive, to ask why they are showing the film outside Nestlé's Head Office in Vevey, Switzerland. The police ask if the film is 'for or against Nestlé'. The reply is "It is not against". After checking their documents the policeman says "we turn it off", referring to showing the film.

== Reception ==
In 2012, The Dark Side of Chocolate was nominated for the Adolf Grimme Award in the category of Information & Culture.

== Personnel ==
- Creators: Miki Mistrati, U. Roberto Romano
- Producer: Helle Faber
- Journalist: Svante Karlshoej Ipsen
- Script: Miki Mistrati
- Editor: Andreas Birch Eriksen
- Research: Ditte Nielsen, Svante Karlshoej Ipsen, Miki Mistrati, U. Roberto Romano, Youchaou * Traor, Assoumane Maiga
- Photographers: Henrik Bohn Ipsen, U. Roberto Romano, Niels Thastum
- Assistant Photographer: Miki Mistrati
- Color Grade: Andreas Birch Eriksen
- Sound: Bobby Hess, Asser Borgen
- Sound Assistant: Ingeborg Holten
- Composer: Jonas Colstrup
- Graphics: Benny Box
- Narrator: David Bateson
- Production Managers: Mathilde Hvid Lippmann, Joel Norup Soegaard
- Production Assistants: Markus Ramlau, Helene Juncher Jensen, Rasmus Odgaard
- Technical Assistance: Jonas Abildgaard
- Translations: Helene Juncher Jensen, Tolkegruppen Koebenhavn (Prestige Network Ltd)
- Webdesign: Kalle Graverholt
- Associates: Osange Silou-Kieffer, Bernard Kieffer, Fabian Abitbol, ProShop Europe
- Partners: Mette Hoffmann (DR2) & Barbara Biemann (NDR)
- Support From: Danida, Media, Monique Dobretz (TSR), Axel Arno (SVT), Arto Hyvonen (YLE), ERR Jaspreet Singh Syan
