= John Reed King =

American radio and television game show host (1914–1979)

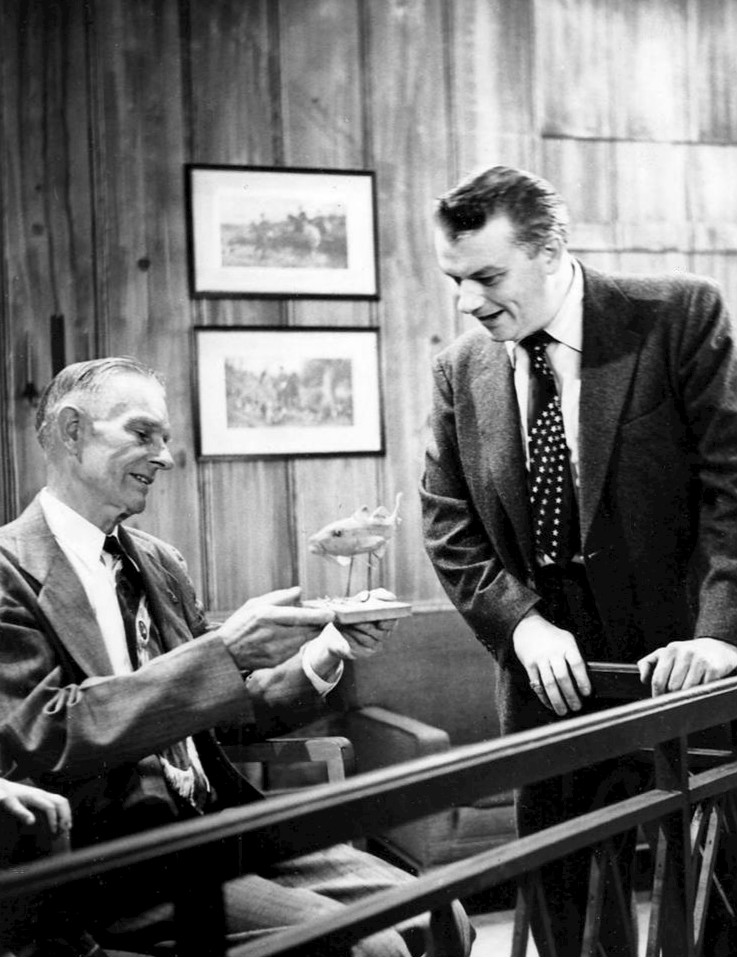
- King at right with a contestant on the television game show There's One In Every Family, 1952.
- Born: October 25, 1914; Wilmington, Delaware
- Died: July 8, 1979 (aged 64); Woodstown, New Jersey
- Occupations: Host on radio and television programs
- Spouse: Jean Abbot King
- Children: 2 daughters, 1 son

John Reed King (October 25, 1914 – July 8, 1979) was an American radio and television game show host who hosted numerous game shows during the 1930s, 1940s, and 1950s.

== Career ==
King was one of the announcers for The American School of the Air on CBS, and he had one of the top-rated radio shows of the 1930s in New York City with Missus Goes A-Shopping. He was also an announcer for the radio version of Death Valley Days and for The Jack Berch Show.

On August 1, 1944, he hosted the live television version of Missus Goes A-Shopping, and on January 29, 1946, he hosted the television version of It's a Gift, making these among the first television quiz shows ever aired, after CBS Television Quiz (1941-1942).

In the late 1940s and early 1950s, King was host of The John Reed King Show, an audience-participation quiz show. It began on WOR-TV and moved to WCBS-TV on February 2, 1950.

He worked at KDKA radio and television in Pittsburgh, Pennsylvania during the 1960s. He was a morning news anchor for the radio station, and hosted a daily talk show on television. In 1970, he was a news anchor at KGO-TV, the ABC owned-and-operated television station in San Francisco, California.

== Personal life ==
He married Jean Elizabeth Abbot (or Abbott). They had two daughters and a son.

== Radio Shows, Host ==
- Missus Goes A-Shopping (1934-1944) CBS Radio and local NYC
- Our Gal Sunday (1937-1940) announcer
- Duffy's Tavern (1941-1942) announcer
- The Gay Nineties Revue (1941) announcer
- What's My Name? (1941)
- Double or Nothing (1944 - 1945)
- Death Valley Days and The Sheriff (1945-1951) announcer
- Give and Take (1945-1953) CBS
- Chance of a Lifetime (1949-1952) ABC
- Sky King (1954) playing the part of Sky King

== Television Shows, Host ==
- Missus Goes A-Shopping (1944-1949) CBS Television
- It's a Gift (1946) CBS
- King's Party Line (1946)
- The John Reed King Show (1949)
- Chance of a Lifetime (1950-1952) ABC; (1953-1955) (DuMont)
- Battle of the Ages (1952)
- Beat the Clock (1952)
- Where Was I? (1952-1953) DuMont
- What's Your Bid? (Feb-April 1953) ABC
- There's One In Every Family (1952-1953) CBS
- Give and Take (1952-1953) CBS
- Why? (1953)
- Let's See (1955) ABC
- Have a Heart (1955) DuMont
- Gunsmoke, episode "Old Comrade" (1962) guest starred as a townsman

== Books ==
- John Reed King's Quiz and Game Book (1949)
