= Lucille Roybal-Allard =

American politician (born 1941)

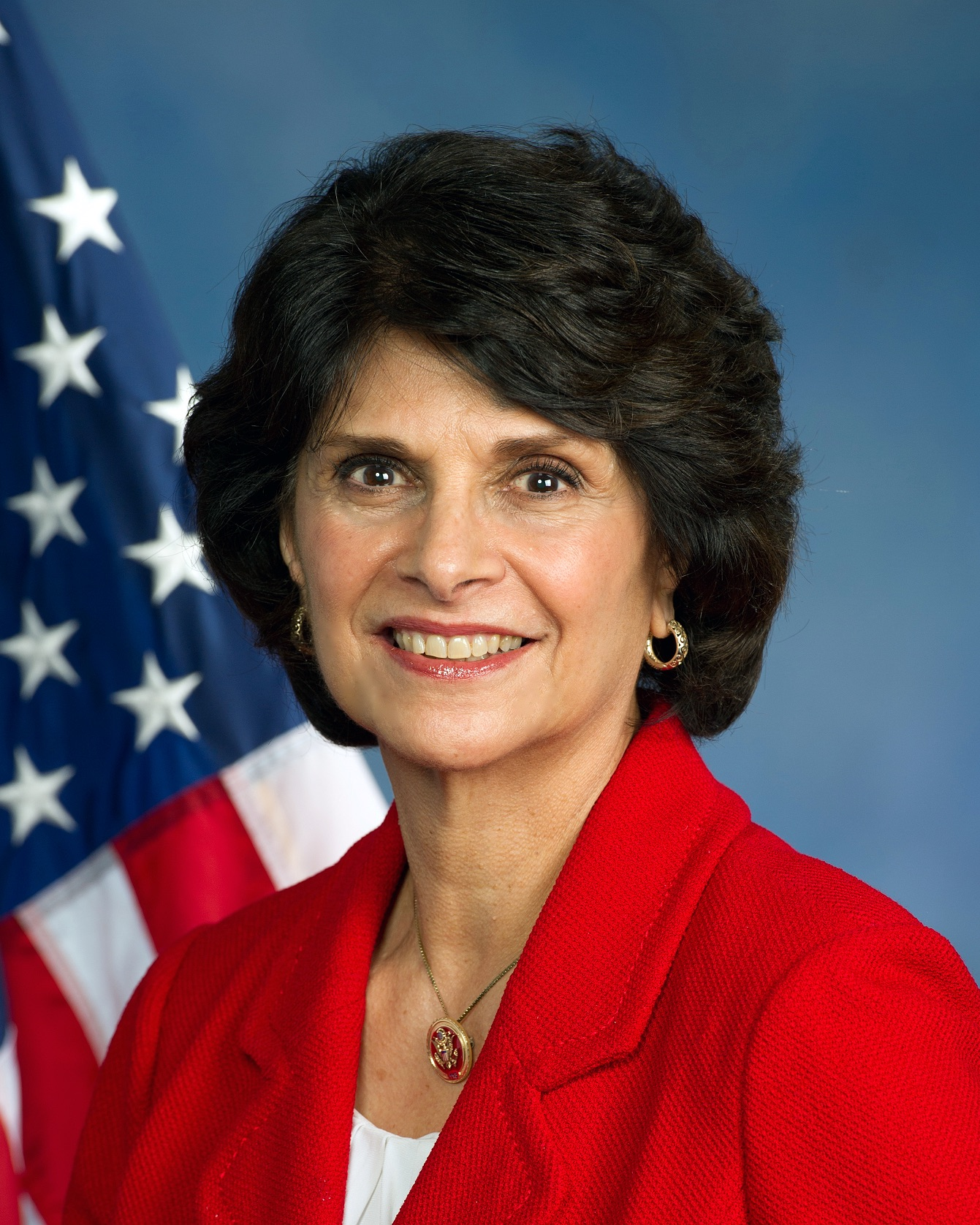
- Official portrait, 2013

Member of the U.S. House of Representatives from California
- In office January 3, 1993 – January 3, 2023
- Preceded by: David Dreier
- Succeeded by: Robert Garcia (redistricted)
- Constituency: 33rd district (1993–2003); 34th district (2003–2013); 40th district (2013–2023)

Member of the California State Assembly from the 56th district
- In office May 18, 1987 – November 30, 1992
- Preceded by: Gloria Molina
- Succeeded by: Bob Epple

Personal details
- Born: Lucille Elsa Roybal; June 12, 1941 (age 85) Boyle Heights, California, U.S.
- Party: Democratic
- Spouse: Edward Allard
- Children: 2
- Relatives: Edward R. Roybal (father)
- Education: California State University, Los Angeles (BA)
- Roybal-Allard's voice Roybal-Allard on the Children's Act for Responsible Employment. Recorded September 15, 2009

Lucille Elsa Roybal-Allard (born June 12, 1941) is an American politician who served as a U.S. representative from California from 1993 to 2023. A member of the Democratic Party, she first entered Congress in 1993. Her district, numbered as the 33rd until 2003, the 34th from 2003 to 2013, and the 40th from 2013 to 2023, included much of southern Los Angeles, as well as several eastern suburbs, such as Downey, Bell and Bell Gardens. On December 20, 2021, Roybal-Allard announced her retirement at the end of the 117th Congress.

== Early life, education, and career ==
Roybal-Allard was born in Boyle Heights, California, the daughter of Edward R. Roybal, who served in Congress from 1963 to 1993, and Lucille Beserra Roybal. She attended Ramona Convent Secondary School in Alhambra, California, graduating in 1959. She also attended California State University, Los Angeles.

Roybal-Allard was a public relations officer and fund-raising executive. She was also a member of the California State Assembly from 1987 to 1992, first elected on May 12, 1987, in a special election to replace Gloria Molina, who resigned after being elected to the Los Angeles City Council.

== U.S. House of Representatives ==
=== Elections ===
In 1992, Roybal-Allard won the Democratic nomination for the newly created 33rd district, which included a sliver of the area her father had represented for 30 years. She won the general election handily and was re-elected 14 times with no substantial opposition in this heavily Democratic, Latino-majority district. Her district was renumbered the 34th after the 2000 census and the 40th after the 2010 census. As of the 2010 census, it is the most Latino district in the nation, with a Latino majority of 86.5%. Until 2013, she represented much of downtown Los Angeles.

=== Tenure ===
Roybal-Allard was the first Latina to serve as one of the 12 "cardinals", or chairs, of a House Appropriations Subcommittee, as well as the first Latina to serve on the House Appropriations Committee. She is also the first woman to chair the Congressional Hispanic Caucus; the first woman to chair the California Democratic congressional delegation; and the founder of the Women's Working Group on Immigration Reform.

Her Sober Truth on Preventing Underage Drinking (STOP) Act has been instrumental in reducing underage drinking and its consequences. From her position on the House Appropriations Committee, she has spearheaded many federal projects that have created jobs and improved her constituents' lives, including the new federal courthouse in Downtown Los Angeles, the Metro Gold Line Lightrail Eastside Extension, the deepening of the Port of Los Angeles, and the ongoing revitalization of the Los Angeles River.

Roybal-Allard chaired the California Democratic congressional delegation in 1998–1999. She has also been active in the Congressional Children's Caucus and on the Democratic Homeland Security and the Livable Communities task forces.

Roybal-Allard was the first Democratic Mexican-American woman to serve in Congress. She and Nydia Velázquez were the third and fourth Latinas elected to Congress, after Barbara Vucanovich and Ileana Ros-Lehtinen. She and Velázquez are the first Latina Democrats to serve in that body, and the first two elected to a full term.

Roybal-Allard introduced the Newborn Screening Saves Lives Reauthorization Act of 2013 (H.R. 1281; 113th Congress) into the House on March 20, 2013. The bill would amend the Public Health Service Act to reauthorize grant programs and other initiatives to promote expanded screening of newborns and children for heritable disorders. Roybal-Allard argued that "newborn screening not only transforms and save lives – it saves money." According to her, in California "newborns are screened for more than 40 preventable and treatable conditions – and for every one dollar California spends on screening, it yields a benefit of over $9 as we prevent disease in children who are diagnosed with these treatable conditions."

Roybal-Allard is the original House author of The Security and Financial Empowerment (SAFE) Act, a bill designed to ensure that survivors of domestic violence, sexual assault, and stalking can get help without fearing the loss of their jobs or economic security. Parts of the SAFE Act were included in the House's 2019 reauthorization of the Violence Against Women Act (VAWA). She also authored The Children's Act for Responsible Employment (CARE) to address abusive and exploitative child labor practices in agriculture.

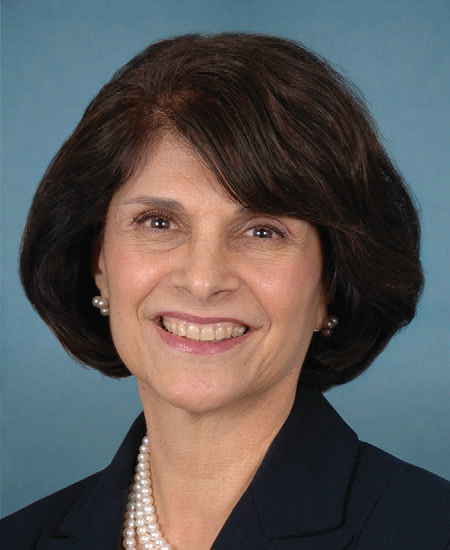
Roybal-Allard during her tenure in the 111th Congress

=== Committee assignments ===
- Committee on Appropriations
  - Subcommittee on Homeland Security (chair)
  - Subcommittee on Labor, Health and Human Services, Education, and Related Agencies

=== Caucus memberships ===
- Congressional Asian Pacific American Caucus (associate member)
- Congressional Arts Caucus
- Congressional Progressive Caucus
- House Baltic Caucus
- Medicare for All Caucus
- Congressional Hispanic Caucus

== Political positions ==
=== Abortion ===
As of 2020, Roybal-Allard has a 100% rating from NARAL Pro-Choice America and an F rating from the Susan B. Anthony List for her abortion-related voting record. She opposed the overturning of Roe v. Wade, calling it an infringement on a woman's right to choose.

== Personal life ==
Roybal-Allard is married to Edward Allard III. They have four children, two of whom are Roybal-Allard's stepchildren. She is Roman Catholic.

Roybal-Allard's archives are in the collection of the California State Archives.

== See also ==
- NALEO
- Children's Act for Responsible Employment (CARE Act), a bill Roybal-Allard introduced to achieve parity between minor workers in the agricultural industry and those in other industries. See also the related film The Harvest.
- List of Hispanic and Latino Americans in the United States Congress
- Women in the United States House of Representatives

U.S. House of Representatives
Preceded by David Dreier	Member of the U.S. House of Representatives from California's 33rd congressional district 1993–2003	Succeeded by Diane Watson
Preceded by Grace Napolitano	Member of the U.S. House of Representatives from California's 34th congressional district 2003–2013	Succeeded by Xavier Becerra
Preceded by Xavier Becerra	Chair of the Congressional Hispanic Caucus; 1999–2001	Succeeded by Silvestre Reyes
Preceded by Ed Royce	Member of the U.S. House of Representatives from California's 40th congressional district 2013–2023	Succeeded by Young Kim
U.S. order of precedence (ceremonial)
Preceded by Dana Rohrabacher as Former U.S. Representative	Order of precedence of the United States as Former U.S. Representative	Succeeded by Collin Peterson as Former U.S. Representative
