= OmniPeace =

- Founded: June 2007
- Founder: Mary Fanaro
- Headquarters: Los Angeles, California
- Key people: Mary Fanaro
- Website: OmniPeace.com

OmniPeace was founded in 2007 by Mary Fanaro, a Los Angeles–based entrepreneur. The foundation is dedicated on building music schools in Rwanda (the Rwanda Rocks Music Schools).

== History ==
In the past ten years, OmniPeace has built nine schools within Dr. Jeff Sachs' (Economist, Global Anti-Poverty Crusader & Head of Earth Institute/Columbia University) Millennium Villages Project; raised funds and awareness for The City of Joy, a rehabilitation center and safe haven for women and children victims of violence of war in Congo; and sent two convoys into Somalia with Super Bowl Champions, The New York Giants, feeding over 10,000 families during one of the worst humanitarian crises in the last 60 years. OmniPeace has previously partnered with organizations including Millennium Promise, UNICEF, the Lalela Project, and buildOn.

== Current work ==
In 2016, OmniPeace Foundation launched its eighth school and first music school in Kigali, Rwanda, a.k.a. the Rwanda Rocks Music School. They launched their ninth school and second music school in the Kiziba Refugee Camp, Rwanda, the first music school inside any camp.

OmniPeace foundation exists to improve the lives of children by building schools to provide basic education. They are now branching out to include music schools in order to give children the opportunity to explore music as a tool of self- expression while nurturing and amplifying the spirit of healing through the power of music.

OmniPeace foundation has also been supported by stars Jennifer Aniston and Courteney Cox.
