= Children's Act for Responsible Employment =

Children's Act for Responsible Employment (CARE Act) is a United States bill that would address the labor conditions of child field workers by imposing the same age, work hour, and pesticide exposure limits as other occupations and increasing the penalties for child labor violations. Representative Lucille Roybal-Allard introduced the Children's Act for Responsible Employment (CARE Act, HR 3564) bill in September 2009 and has subsequently reintroduced it.

== Background ==
Children as young as 12 years of age who work as many as 12 hours a day, six months a year, subject to hazardous conditions: heat exposure, pesticides, and dangerous work. The agriculture industry has been subject to significantly more lenient labor laws than any other occupation in the United States. As a result, lack of consistent schooling significantly limits their opportunities of succeeding in high school or more. The hazardous conditions threaten their health and lives.

The Fair Labor Standards Act (FLSA), which is the cornerstone law of U.S. child labor protection, was originally enacted in 1938 to address the widespread abuse and injury suffered by industrial working children. At the time, family farmwork was common, and so the bill carved out lighter standards for kids working in agriculture. Farm work has grown increasingly mechanized and industrialized since, due to automation and concentration of the farming industry. Today, the FLSA and related legislation adhere to the original standards for agriculture. The Association of Farmworker Opportunity Programs estimates that there are between 400,000 and 500,000 children working in the farming industry. Children as young as 12 years of age work in the fields. There is no maximum number of hours worked a day, aside from being outside of school hours. They are exposed to the extreme heat, harmful pesticides and hazardous conditions. Children are in up to three times greater danger of exposure to pesticides than adults due to their size and stage of biological development. Injuries or fatalities occur due to untrained use of heavy powered equipment. The fatality rate is six times that in any other industry: children account for 20% of all farm deaths. Although agriculture is among the top hazardous occupations for kids, no official statistics are maintained to monitor the depth of serious accidents stemming from child labor.

Children in fields or on farms spend on average 30 hours a week working, including during the school year. This impacts academic achievement, and 50% of children who work on farms will fail to graduate high school. The United States Department of Labor estimates that children net an income of about $1,000 after one year of work.

== CARE legislation ==
Representative Lucille Roybal-Allard introduced of the Children's Act for Responsible Employment (CARE Act, HR 3564) bill in September 2009. The Children's Act for Responsible Employment (CARE Act, HR 3564) addresses the harshest conditions that tens of thousands of children as young as 12 years of age may be subject to, such as restrictions in the number of hours that children work in a day. The intention of the bill is to raise the standard for children working in agriculture to that of any other occupation in the United States. As of September 1, 2010 the bill had 103 co-sponsors.

While on Capitol Hill, Longoria and Romano showed scenes from the feature-length documentary The Harvest to illustrate the harsh working conditions and exploitation of children in the fields.

In September 2009 a panel discussion was hosted by Secretary of Labor Hilda Solis and including Dolores Huerta of the United Farm Workers, filmmaker Robin Romano, Mark Lara from the Department of Labor's Wage and Hour Division, and other experts. During the presentation, details of Roybal-Allard's bill were outlined: a child must be a minimum of 14 years of age to work in the fields, children under the age of 16 are restricted from working in the fields if it affects their health or school performance, and children under the age of 18 are restricted from hazardous work.

== The Harvest documentary film ==
The Harvest (documentary) film was viewed at a United States Department of Labor panel discussion in September, 2009. The film revisits Edward R. Murrow’s Harvest of Shame, filmed 40 years ago, and reveals that little has changed over the past four decades in the lives of migrant farm workers in the United States. The purpose of the documentary is to bring awareness of the harsh working conditions which tens of thousands of children face in the fields of the United States each year and to enact the Children's Act for Responsible Employment (CARE Act, HR 3564) which will bring parity of labor conditions to field workers that are afforded to minors in other occupations.

On the one-year anniversary of the Representative Lucille Roybal-Allard's introduction of the CARE Act legislation in September 2009, Eva Longoria and film director U. Roberto Romano visited Capitol Hill to continue to bring awareness of the bill and the plight of minor children working in the fields.

== See also ==
- The Harvest (documentary)
- Harvest of Shame, Edward R. Murrow's 1960 television documentary that told of the plight of migrant workers in the United States.
- Fair Labor Standards Act
- International Labour Organization
- Child labor
- Migrant worker
