= 1955 in television =

The year 1955 in television involved some significant events. Below is a list of television-related events during 1955.

== Events ==
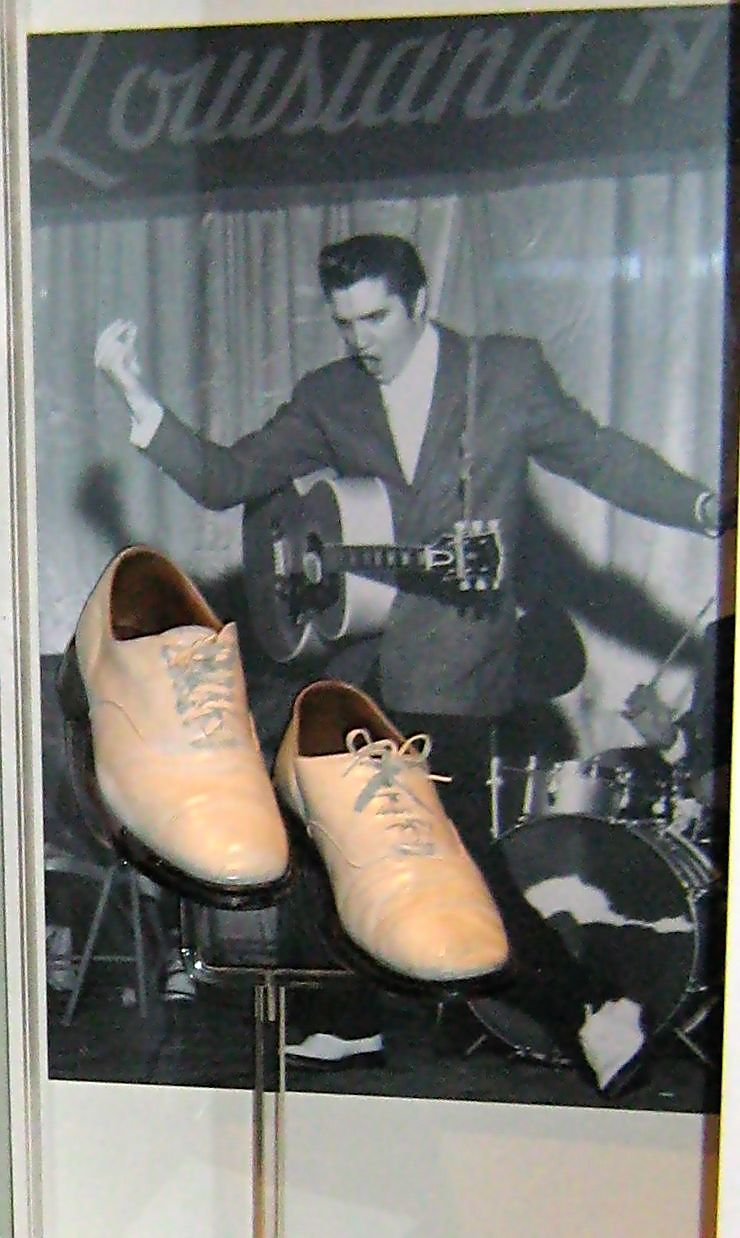
Elvis appears in Louisiana Hayride

- January 10 – Minuto de Dios begins airing on television in Colombia; it will still be running more than 60 years later.
- March 5 – Elvis Presley appears on television for the first time. The program is Louisiana Hayride, televised locally in Shreveport, Louisiana.
- March 12 – The first Flemish children's TV show, Kom Toch Eens Kijken, is broadcast, hosted by Bob Davidse (Nonkel Bob) and Terry Van Ginderen (Tante Terry).
- March 15 – The play No Time for Sergeants is broadcast by the American Broadcasting Company in The United States Steel Hour series, starring Andy Griffith in his television debut.
- April 1 – The DuMont Television Network in the United States drastically decreases its programming; just eight series keep the network operating, in anticipation of its eventual shutdown sixteen months later.
- May 9 – In the United States:
  - Harpo Marx makes a memorable appearance on I Love Lucy.
  - Jim Henson's puppet show Sam and Friends first airs on WRC-TV in Washington, D.C., introducing Kermit.
- May 10 – The first episode of the long-running and popular Flemish TV sitcom Schipper naast Mathilde is broadcast.
- June 7 – The quiz show craze begins with the premiere of The 64,000 Dollar Question in the U.S. The series spawns many imitations, including Twenty-One the next year, which will later be the focus of a quiz show scandal that results in congressional hearings.
- June 24 – Channel 4 Bang Khum Phron is launched by Thai Thorathat (Thai Television, predecessor of MCOT HD), the first official television station in Thailand.
- June 29 – Life with the Lyons, one of the first successful British sitcoms (starring British-domiciled American couple Ben Lyon and Bebe Daniels), premieres on the BBC Television Service, having previously been broadcast only on radio. It will later transfer to ITV.
- July 19 – Eesti Televisioon begins broadcasting from Tallinn in the Estonian Soviet Socialist Republic.
- August 1 – Austrian ORF Television, predecessor of ORF eins, an officially regular broadcasting service, starts in Vienna.
- September 22 – Commercial television starts in the United Kingdom with the Independent Television Authority's first ITV franchise beginning broadcasting in London – Associated-Rediffusion on weekdays, ATV during weekends, ending the previous BBC monopoly. The rest of the UK receives its regional ITV franchises during the next seven years. The first advertisement shown is for Gibbs SR toothpaste.
- September 28 – World Series baseball is broadcast in color for the first time in the U.S. WITN-TV in Washington, North Carolina, signs on the air with game 1 of the 1955 World Series as their first telecast.
- December 10 – The first Saturday morning cartoon series debuts on U.S. television, The Mighty Mouse Playhouse on CBS.
- December 24 – The Lennon Sisters make their television debut on The Lawrence Welk Show on ABC in the U.S.
- December 25 – After being broadcast by radio since 1932, the Royal Christmas Message is broadcast on British television for the first time, in sound only at 3.00pm on both television channels, live from Sandringham House. The first visual Christmas message is shown in 1957.

== Programs/programmes ==
- Adventures of Superman (1952–1958)
- American Bandstand (1952–1989)
- Annie Oakley (1954–1957)
- Aubrey and Gus (1955–1956)
- Beau temps, mauvais temps (1955–1958)
- Bim Bam Boom (1955–1956)
- Bozo the Clown (1949–present)
- Candid Camera (1948–present)
- Cap-aux-sorciers (1955–1958)
- Captain Kangaroo (1955–1984)
- Cisco Kid (1950–1956)
- Climax! (1954–1958)
- Come Dancing (UK) (1949–1995)
- Country Canada (1955–2007)
- Cross-Canada Hit Parade (1955–1960)
- Death Valley Days (1952–1975)
- Disneyland (1954–1958)
- Dragnet (1951–1959)
- Face the Nation (1954–present)
- Father Knows Best (1954-1960)
- General Motors Theatre (Can) (1953–1956, 1958–1961)
- Fury (1955-1960)
- Gillette Cavalcade of Sports (1946–1960)
- Hallmark Hall of Fame (1951–present)
- Hockey Night in Canada (1952–present)
- Howdy Doody (1947–1960)
- I Love Lucy (1951–1960)
- Junior Magazine (1955–1962)
- Kraft Television Theater (1947–1958)
- Kukla, Fran and Ollie (1947–1957)
- Life is Worth Living (1952–1957)
- Love of Life (1951–1980)
- Maggie Muggins (1955–1962)
- Meet the Press (1947–present)
- Musical Chairs (1955) – game show hosted by Bill Leyden
- Our Miss Brooks (1952-1956)
- Panorama (UK) (1953–present)
- Search for Tomorrow (1951–1986)
- Sergeant Preston of the Yukon (1955-1958)
- Talent Varieties (1955) – country music variety show
- The Adventures of Ozzie and Harriet (1952–1966)
- The Brighter Day (1954–1962)
- The Colgate Comedy Hour (1950-1955)
- The Danny Thomas Show (1953-1964)
- The Ed Sullivan Show (1948–1971)
- The George Burns and Gracie Allen Show (1950–1958)
- The Goldbergs (1949–1956)
- The Good Old Days (UK) (1953–1983)
- The Grove Family (UK) (1954–1957)
- The Guiding Light (1952–present)
- The Jack Benny Program (1950–1965)
- The Jane Wyman Show, Fireside Theatre (1949-1958)
- The Jimmy Durante Show (1954–1956)
- The Milton Berle Show (1954–1967)
- The Roy Rogers Show (1951–1957)
- The Secret Storm (1954–1974)
- The Today Show (1952–present)
- The Tonight Show (1954–present)
- The Voice of Firestone (1949–1963)
- This Is Your Life (US) (1952–1961)
- Truth or Consequences (1950–1988)
- What's My Line (1950–1967)
- Your Hit Parade (1950–1959)
- Zoo Quest (UK) (1954–1964)

=== Debuts ===
- January 2 – The Bob Cummings Show (also known as Love That Bob) on NBC (1955–1959)
- January 3 – Hollywood Today on NBC (1955)
- January 5 – Norby on NBC (1955), first regular weekly series broadcast by NBC in its new all-electronic compatible color system
- January 15 – The Benny Hill Show (UK) on BBC Television (later moving to ITV; 1955–1989)
- January 22 – Ozark Jubilee, the first popular country music series on American network television, on ABC (1955–1960), featuring Red Foley
- April 9 – Science Fiction Theatre also known as Beyond the Limits during syndication in the 1960s (1955–1957)
- May 9 – Jim Henson's First Muppet Series: Sam and Friends on WRC-TV (1955–1961)
- May 10 – Schipper naast Mathilde (Belgium) on N.I.R. (1955–1963)
- June 25 – The Soldiers, an 11-episode live military comedy, aired on NBC through September 3.
- June 28 – Talent Varieties on ABC through November 1
- June 29 – Life With The Lyons (UK), one of the first successful British sitcoms (though starring an American, Ben Lyon), on BBC Television (1955–1960)
- July 2 – The Lawrence Welk Show on ABC (1955–1982)
- July 9 – Dixon of Dock Green (UK) on BBC Television (1955–1976)
- July 20 – Frankie Laine Time on CBS (1955–1956)
- July 29 – This Is Your Life (UK) on BBC Television (1955–2003)
- September 10
  - Gunsmoke on CBS (1955–1975)
  - It's Always Jan, starring Janis Paige, on CBS (1955–1956)
- September 12 – Medical Horizons on ABC (1955–1956)
- September 20
  - Cheyenne on ABC (1955–1962)
  - Joe and Mabel on CBS (1955–1956)
- September 26 – Jungle Jim in syndication (1955–1956)
- September 28 – Brave Eagle on CBS (1955–1956)
- September 29 – Sergeant Preston of the Yukon on CBS (1955-1958)
- October 1 – The Honeymooners on CBS, starring Jackie Gleason (1955–1956)
- October 2 – Alfred Hitchcock Presents on CBS (1955–1962)
- October 3
  - Captain Kangaroo on CBS (1955–1984)
  - The Mickey Mouse Club on ABC, featuring "Mouseketeer" Annette Funicello (1955–1959)
- October 20 – Wanted, a crime documentary on CBS (only ran for three months) (1955–1956)
- October 22 – Quatermass II (UK), sequel to 1953's The Quatermass Experiment, on BBC Television (ends on November 26)
- October 31 – Matinee Theatre on NBC, a five-days-a-week live dramatic anthology, with most of the plays in the series broadcast in color (lasted until 1958)

=== Programs ending ===
Date	Show	Debut
January 27	So You Want to Lead a Band	1954
March 11	The Jack Carson Show; Stories of the Century	1954
April 6	Norby	1955
April 8	Dear Phoebe	1954
April 22	The Ray Bolger Show	1953
June 4	The Mickey Rooney Show: Hey, Mulligan	1954
June 16	Willy	1954
June 23	The Public Defender	1954
June 25	The Imogene Coca Show	1954
June 26	The Pepsi-Cola Playhouse	1953
July 1	Hawkins Falls	1951
July 15	Flash Gordon	1954
July 26	Who Said That?	1948
August 24	My Little Margie	1952
September 1	Life with Elizabeth	1952
September 13	Place the Face	1953
September 17	Musical Chairs	1955
Unknown	Frankie Laine Time	1955
Unknown	Muffin the Mule (UK)	1946
Unknown	The Jo Stafford Show	1954
Unknown	That's My Boy	1954

== Births ==
Date	Name	Notability
January 6	Rowan Atkinson	English comic actor (Mr. Bean, Blackadder)
January 9	J. K. Simmons	Actor (The Closer, Oz, Law & Order)
January 10	Jimmy Vivino	Band leader
January 14	Bill Flanagan	Radio host
January 18	Kevin Costner	Actor
January 20	Wyatt Knight	Actor (died 2011)
January 20	Lisa Zeno Churgin	Film editor
January 21	Jeff Franklin	Producer
January 22	John Wesley Shipp	Actor (The Flash, Dawson's Creek)
February 2	Michael Talbott	Actor (Miami Vice)
February 2	Kim Zimmer	Actress (Guiding Light, One Life to Live)
February 7	Miguel Ferrer	Actor (Crossing Jordan, NCIS: Los Angeles) (d. 2017)
February 7	Rolf Benirschke	American former professional football player
February 8	Ethan Phillips	Actor (Benson, Star Trek: Voyager)
February 10	Jim Cramer	American television personality
February 11	Bianca Ferguson	Actress
February 14	James Eckhouse	Actor (Beverly Hills, 90210)
February 15	Christopher McDonald	Actor (Family Law)
February 19	Jeff Daniels	Actor
February 21	Kelsey Grammer	Actor, comedian (Cheers, Frasier)
February 28	Adrian Dantley	NBA basketball player
February 28	Gilbert Gottfried	Actor, comedian (Saturday Night Live, Aladdin, Cyberchase) (died 2022)
March 3	Darnell Williams	British-born soap opera actor (All My Children)
March 3	Andy Breckman	Writer
March 6	James Saito	Actor (Eli Stone)
March 7	Anupam Kher	Actor
March 17	Gary Sinise	Actor, producer, director (CSI: NY)
March 17	Mark Boone Junior	Actor
March 18	Jeff Stelling	TV presenter
March 19	Bruce Willis	Actor (Moonlighting)
March 23	Moses Malone	NBA basketball player (died 2015)
March 28	Reba McEntire	Singer, actress (Reba)
March 29	Marina Sirtis	Actress (Star Trek: The Next Generation)
March 29	Christopher Lawford	Actor (died 2018)
March 29	Brendan Gleeson	Actor
April 5	Akira Toriyama	Manga artist (Dragon Ball, Dragon Ball Z, Dragon Ball GT) (died 2024)
April 7	Alexandra Neil	Soap opera actress
April 11	Michele Scarabelli	Actress (Alien Nation)
April 17	Kristine Sutherland	Actress (Buffy the Vampire Slayer)
April 24	John de Mol Jr.	Dutch media tycoon television producer
April 28	Todd Waring	Actor
April 29	Kate Mulgrew	Actress (Star Trek: Voyager, Orange is the New Black)
May 5	Melinda Culea	Actress (The A-Team)
May 6	Tom Bergeron	American game show host
May 7	Peter Reckell	Actor (Days of Our Lives)
May 10	Larry "Flash" Jenkins	Actor (The White Shadow) (d. 2019)
May 10	Rick Steves	Television personality
May 11	Shabba Doo	Television actor (d. 2020)
May 12	Scott Brazil	Television producer (d. 2006)
May 15	Lee Horsley	Actor (Matt Houston, Paradise)
May 17	Bill Paxton	Actor (Twister, Big Love) (d. 2017)
May 23	Ken Michelman	Actor (The White Shadow)
May 25	Connie Sellecca	Actress (Flying High, The Greatest American Hero, Hotel)
May 25	Bobby Slayton	Actor
May 27	Eric Bischoff	Television producer
May 27	Richard Schiff	Actor (The West Wing)
May 31	Susie Essman	Actress
June 1	Tony Snow	American journalist (d. 2008)
June 2	Dana Carvey	Comic actor (Saturday Night Live)
June 6	Sam Simon	Writer and director (d. 2015)
June 8	Griffin Dunne	Actor and director
June 10	Andrew Stevens	Actor (Dallas), producer, director
June 13	Mara Liasson	American journalist
June 15	Polly Draper	Actress (thirtysomething)
June 15	Ted Harbert	American broadcasting and television executive
June 16	Laurie Metcalf	Actress (Roseanne)
June 18	Leon Herbert	Actor
June 21	Leigh McCloskey	Actor (Dallas)
June 21	David Marshall Grant	Actor
June 24	Betsy Randle	Actress (Boy Meets World)
June 28	Jim Nelford	Golfer
July 3	Bob Thiele Jr.	Musician
July 3	Bruce Altman	Actor
July 3	John Cramer	American television announcer
July 9	Jimmy Smits	Actor (L.A. Law, NYPD Blue, The West Wing)
July 9	Yvonne Hudson	Actress (Saturday Night Live)
July 17	Bill Geddie	American television producer (died 2023)
July 19	Toborr Kristina Tomlinsen	Actress (voice of Rinna Raccoon on the Rocky Raccoon cartoon series)
July 19	Tudi Roche	Actress
July 22	Willem Dafoe	Actor
July 28	Mike Merritt	Musician
August 2	Tim Dunigan	Actor (Captain Power and the Soldiers of the Future)
August 3	Corey Burton	Voice actor (The Transformers, DuckTales, Chip 'n Dale Rescue Rangers, Superman: The Animated Series)
August 7	Wayne Knight	Actor (Seinfeld, 3rd Rock from the Sun)
August 14	Gillian Taylforth	English actress (EastEnders)
August 16	Jeff Perry	Actor
August 19	Peter Gallagher	Actor (The O.C., Covert Affairs)
August 24	Mike Huckabee	Politician and commentator (Huckabee)
August 27	Diana Scarwid	Actress (Truman, Wonderfalls)
September 2	Linda Purl	Actress and singer (Matlock)
September 3	Steve Jones	Actor and singer
September 3	James Duff	Writer
September 7	Mira Furlan	Actress (Babylon 5, Lost) (died 2021)
September 9	Edward Hibbert	English-American actor (Frasier, Earthworm Jim)
September 12	Peter Scolari	Actor (Bosom Buddies, Newhart) (died 2021)
September 16	Jonathan Meath	Producer
September 18	David Mirkin	Producer
September 20	Betsy Brantley	Actress
September 21	Rebecca Balding	Actress (Soap, Charmed)
September 29	Gwen Ifill	Journalist (died 2016)
October 8	Darrell Hammond	Actor (Saturday Night Live)
October 9	Linwood Boomer	Actor
October 14	Arleen Sorkin	Actress (Days of Our Lives, Batman: The Animated Series) (died 2023)
October 16	Ellen Dolan	Actress (Guiding Light, As the World Turns)
October 26	Jonathan Murray	American television producer
October 27	Michael Shamus Wiles	Actor
October 30	Shanna Reed	Actress (Major Dad)
November 13	Whoopi Goldberg	Actress, comedian, talk-show host (The View)
November 17	Bill Macatee	Sportscaster
November 17	Yolanda King	Activist (died 2007)
November 22	George Alagiah	News broadcaster
November 23	Peter Douglas	Actor
November 25	Norman Buckley	Director
November 27	Bill Nye	Educator (Bill Nye the Science Guy)
November 29	Howie Mandel	Actor, host (St. Elsewhere, Deal or No Deal)
November 30	Kevin Conroy	Voice actor (Batman: The Animated Series) (d. 2022)
December 2	Dennis Christopher	Actor
December 3	Melody Anderson	Actress (Manimal)
December 3	Steven Culp	Actor (JAG, The West Wing, Desperate Housewives)
December 5	Byron York	American conservative correspondent
December 6	Steven Wright	Actor
December 16	Xander Berkeley	Actor (24, The Mentalist, Nikita)
December 18	Joel Surnow	American television writer
December 21	Jane Kaczmarek	Actress (Malcolm in the Middle)
December 23	Stefan Arngrim	Actor
December 24	Clarence Gilyard	Actor (died 2022)
December 27	Barbara Olson	Television commentator (died 2001)

== Television debuts ==
- Harry Belafonte – Front Row Center
- Terry Burnham – Climax!
- David Doyle – The Philco Television Playhouse
- Zsa Zsa Gabor – Climax!
- James Garner – Cheyenne
- George Gaynes – NBC Opera Theatre
- James Hong – TV Reader's Digest
- Myrna Loy – General Electric Theater
- Fred MacMurray – General Electric Theater
- Tim McCoy – Indian Agent
- Laurence Olivier – Richard III
- Don Rickles – Stage 7
- John Saxon – Medic
- Maggie Smith – Sunday Night Theatre
- Rod Taylor – Studio 57
- Rudy Vallée – Star Tonight
- Robert Vaughn – Medic
- John Wayne – Gunsmoke
- Johnny Weissmuller – Jungle Jim
- Jane Wyman – General Electric Theater
