= Joker's Favor =

- Batman: The Animated Series episode
- Episode no.: Season 1 Episode 22
- Directed by: Boyd Kirkland
- Written by: Paul Dini
- Based on: Batman by Bob Kane (credited) and Bill Finger (uncredited)
- Original air date: September 11, 1992

Guest appearances
- Mark Hamill as the Joker; Arleen Sorkin as Harley Quinn; Ed Begley Jr. as Charlie Collins; Neil Ross as Henshaw

Episode chronology
← Previous "Feat of Clay: Part 2"	Next → "Vendetta"

"Joker's Favor" is the 22nd episode of Batman: The Animated Series. It was directed by Boyd Kirkland and written by Paul Dini, and first aired on September 11, 1992. The episode features the first appearance of the Joker's sidekick and love interest Harley Quinn, who was later introduced into the Batman comic book and eventually become a popular character in her own right. Batman himself only appears briefly in the episode.

== Plot ==
Charlie Collins, a mild-mannered Gotham City accountant, is coming home from a bad day at work when he curses at a bad driver who turns out to be the Joker. He tries to escape, but the Joker follows him, and he is forced into the woods, where his car stops. He gets out, thinking he has escaped, but the Joker suddenly appears. Pleading for his life, he promises the Joker he will do anything if only he lets him go. Joker agrees to let him go and makes Charlie promise to do him a favor in return, taking his driver's license.

Two years later, Charlie has moved to Springdale, Ohio, and changed his name, but the Joker tracks him down to obtain the favor: helping him and Harley attack a testimonial dinner for Commissioner Gordon. He agrees, but sets up a makeshift Bat-Signal before the testimonial starts. The Joker and Harley arrive, the former hidden in a cake, and deploy nerve gas to immobilize the police. They then place a bomb on Gordon's chest, then bid farewell to Charlie, whose hand is glued to the door handle. Batman arrives in time to get rid of the bomb, which destroys the Joker's getaway van. A small fight ensues between Batman, Joker's goons, and Harley before he faces off with the Joker, who tries setting off another bomb. Batman is able to throw the bomb underground before it detonates.

Joker escapes in the commotion, but Charlie confronts him in an alleyway, punching him in the stomach and threatening to kill them both with a Joker bomb that he stole. He then mocks the Joker, saying that the newspapers will report that the infamous Joker died at the hands of a "nobody". Batman arrives and tells Charlie to stop, but he refuses, insisting that Joker will simply escape if he is jailed again. Horrified, Joker gives up all the information that he has on Charlie to stop him. Charlie throws the bomb at the Joker, but it turns out to be a harmless firework. Amused by Charlie's prank, Batman takes a humiliated Joker into custody, leaving Charlie to happily return to his family.

== Voice cast ==
- Kevin Conroy as Bruce Wayne / Batman
- Bob Hastings as Commissioner Gordon
- Robert Costanzo as Harvey Bullock
- Efrem Zimbalist Jr. as Alfred Pennyworth
- Mark Hamill as The Joker
- Arleen Sorkin as Dr. Harleen Quinzel / Harley Quinn
- Ed Begley Jr. as Charlie Collins
- Neil Ross as Henshaw

== Critical reception ==
The episode has received good reviews from critics, even long after its initial airing. In 2012, Steven Padnick of Tor.com praises Mark Hamill's acting and cites Ed Begley Jr.'s "second great guest performance in a row" as Charlie. Oliver Sava of The A.V. Club called it "the series' first great Joker episode" and gave it a grade of "A−".

== See also ==
- List of Batman: The Animated Series episodes
