= Harley Quinn =

DC Comics character

- Various incarnations of Harley Quinn, as depicted in Harley Quinn (vol. 4) #43. Art by Nicola Scott.

Publication information
- Publisher: DC Comics
- First appearance: Batman: The Animated Series "Joker's Favor" (September 11, 1992)
- First comic appearance: The Batman Adventures #12 (September 1993, non-canon); Batman: Harley Quinn #1 (October 1999, canon)
- Created by: Paul Dini; Bruce Timm

In-story information
- Alter ego: Harleen Frances Quinzel
- Species: Metahuman
- Place of origin: Gotham City; Brooklyn (formerly)
- Team affiliations: Suicide Squad; Gotham City Sirens; Secret Six; Justice League; Batman family
- Partnerships: Joker; Poison Ivy; Catwoman; Batman; King Shark; Peacemaker; Bloodsport
- Notable aliases: Dr. Harleen Quinzel; Holly Chance; Dr. Jessica Seaborn
- Abilities: Highly skilled gymnast and acrobat; Doctor of Medicine in psychiatry; Enhanced strength, agility, reflexes, stamina, and durability; Immunity to toxins; Underwater breathing; Access to gag weaponry

Harley Quinn (Dr. Harleen Frances Quinzel) is a character appearing in American comic books published by DC Comics. She was created by Paul Dini and Bruce Timm for Batman: The Animated Series as a henchwoman for the Joker, and debuted in the series' 22nd episode, "Joker's Favor", on September 11, 1992. Although originally intended to appear in only one episode, Quinn became a recurring character within the DC Animated Universe (DCAU) as the Joker's sidekick and love interest, and was adapted into DC Comics' canon seven years later, beginning with the one-shot Batman: Harley Quinn #1 (October 1999). Quinn's origin story portrays her as a former psychiatrist at Arkham Asylum in Gotham City manipulated by the Joker, her patient, eventually becoming his accomplice and lover.

The character's alias is a play on the stock character Harlequin from the 16th-century Italian theatre commedia dell'arte. Following her introduction into comics in 1999, she has been depicted as a former doctor-turned-sidekick and lover of the Joker, as well as a close friend and love interest of Poison Ivy.

Harley Quinn's abilities include expert gymnastic skills, and fast agility proficiency with weapons and hand-to-hand combat, complete unpredictability, immunity to toxins, and enhanced strength, agility, and durability. She often wields clown-themed gag weapons, with an oversized mallet serving as her signature weapon. Additionally, she has a pair of pet hyenas, Bud and Lou, who sometimes act as her attack dogs. Quinn has become one of DC Comics' most popular and commercially successful characters, appearing in numerous comic book titles and being adapted into various other media and merchandise. DC Comics publisher Jim Lee has described Harley Quinn as the fourth pillar of DC Comics' publishing line, after Superman, Batman, and Wonder Woman.

The character has been adapted into various media incarnations. In film, she has been portrayed by Margot Robbie in the DC Extended Universe (DCEU) films Suicide Squad (2016), Birds of Prey (2020), and The Suicide Squad (2021), and by Lady Gaga in Joker: Folie à Deux (2024). In television, she was portrayed by Mia Sara in Birds of Prey (2002–2003) and had a voice cameo by Tara Strong in Arrow. Arleen Sorkin, the character's original voice and inspiration, along with Tara Strong, Hynden Walch, and Kaley Cuoco (in the eponymous Harley Quinn animated series), are among the many performers who have voiced the character in animation and video games.

== History ==
=== Creation and development ===
Harley Quinn as she appears in the DC Animated Universe, art by Bruce Timm.

Harley Quinn was created by Paul Dini and Bruce Timm for the 1992 Batman: The Animated Series episode entitled "Joker's Favor" while Dini was writing the episode. For the episode, Dini decided to put henchpeople for the title episode character as comic relief to lighten the story, as Dini described as a dark story. Initially written as an animated equivalent of a walk-on role, Harley Quinn was intended to appear in just one episode. Her popularity was unexpected, and the character became a surprise success. As Dini was putting together the story for the episode, he created Harley Quinn because it needed a character for the Joker to have pop out of a cake, and the idea of the Joker doing it seemed too strange, so Dini and the crew devised a female sidekick to be the surprise, but finally decided to put him inside the cake instead while keeping Harley in the episode. Then Dini wanted to introduce a foil for the supervillain the Joker that would emphasize the Joker's comic book personality traits: funny, scary, and egotistical. He then thought of giving Joker a henchwoman, inspired by the molls of the 1960s live-action Batman series, among other TV series, and then decided she would be a "funny counterpart to the Joker to maybe work up a little Punch and Judy attitude between them"; Dini stated, "[...] she could crack a joke and the henchmen would laugh, and the Joker would kind of glare at her". The character idea dated back in 1991, when Dini witnessed his college friend Arleen Sorkin play a jester in an episode of Days of Our Lives. Dini then based Harley Quinn on Sorkin, incorporating aspects such as her mannerisms and "snappy, wisecracking, bubbly blonde" personality. Dini even decided to have Sorkin voice her. In recording Harley Quinn's voice, Sorkin spoke in her normal New York accent while putting in a "little Yiddish sound", since Dini made the character Jewish, another aspect of the character borrowed from Sorkin; Dini described her voice for the character as having "a snappy blonde but also kind of a bad girl": "a little bit of Adelaide from Guys and Dolls, a little bit of Judy Holliday", and "a lot of Arleen", stating that it sounded "very close" to Sorkin's voice.

External media

Images
- Paul Dini's original design for Harley Quinn, a "crazy blond character in a miniskirt" based on actress Barbara Eden and "1940s screwballs" such as Betty Hutton, Gloria Grahame, and Claudette Colbert.

Video
- The dream sequence from Days of Our Lives in which Arleen Sorkin plays a jester, which served as inspiration for the character's creation. Dini came across the scene while watching a VHS tape of Sorkin's "favorite Days moments", which he had received from her.

Dini had several names in mind while naming the character, such as Columbine, and eventually settled on the name "Harley Quinn". Dini chose the name for the character to be in line with other Batman characters's names being puns, and also because he thought "Harley was a fun name for a girl". The name Harley Quinn is a play on Harlequin, a stock character from the sixteenth-century Italian physical comedy theater commedia dell'arte.

In designing the character, Timm did a "simplified supervillain version" of traditional Harlequin gear; from the commedia dell'arte original, he took the jester hat, ruffled collar, diamond pattern, and domino mask and put them on a red-and-black bodysuit, on which the diamonds were strategically placed for easier animation. Timm took Harley Quinn's red and black color scheme from the Golden Age comic book character Daredevil. Dini had previously made a rough design for the character, which Timm improved on.

=== Expanded role ===
"Eventually each of the directors wanted to do a Harley episode, so the character began to appear in stories without the Joker. Over the years she allied herself with best gal pal Poison Ivy for occasional romps through Gotham and has even succeeded in giving Batman a hard time on her own. We now look upon Harley as our series' wild card, capable of showing up anytime to bedevil our heroes with her screwball antics".

— Paul Dini

After seeing Harley Quinn in the rough cut of "Joker's Favor", the producers of Batman: The Animated Series, which include Dini and Timm, were impressed with the result, with Dini wanting to bring the character back for more episodes. Timm and another producer, Alan Burnett, were initially reluctant of this and thought that giving Joker a girlfriend "played more towards his comedic side" and would "humanize him too much", which contrasted their vision for Joker as a character who is "as serious a threat as possible to Batman". Nevertheless, months after "Joker's Favor", Harley made a second appearance on the show in the episode "The Laughing Fish", which she became the Joker's love interest, and "Almost Got 'Im", though, by airdate, the latter episode came out earlier than the first. In "Joker's Wild", which is between "The Laughing Fish" and "Almost Got 'Im" by production and vice-versa by airdate, in the title casino, waiters dressed as Harley appear, along with a photograph of her in a file. Harley Quinn gained popularity with fans of The Animated Series, with the character being featured more on the show and eventually starring in her own episodes, such as 1993's "Harley and Ivy", which introduced a friendship/romance between her and fellow supervillain Poison Ivy, and 1994's "Harlequinade" and "Harley's Holiday", which explored her life without the Joker. Harley Quinn then became a recurring character in the DC Animated Universe, appearing in The Animated Series sequel The New Batman Adventures, the direct-to-video film Batman Beyond: Return of the Joker, and in non-Batman animation such as Superman: The Animated Series, Static Shock, and Justice League. In February 1994, she made her first appearance in a video game in The Adventures of Batman and Robin, an action platformer based on Batman: The Animated Series.

=== Transition to comic books ===
"Tango with Evil" by Alex Ross, from the cover of Harley's canonical debut Batman: Harley Quinn. Widely described as iconic, the artwork depicts Harley dancing with a tuxedo-clad Joker and was later recreated in the 2016 film Suicide Squad.

Because of her popularity, Harley Quinn was adapted into DC's comic books. In September 1993 (cover date), a year following Harley Quinn's first appearance in Batman: The Animated Series, the character made her comic book debut in the 12th issue of The Batman Adventures, a series set in the universe of The Animated Series, and became a regular character. In 1997, she appeared in the story Batman: Thrillkiller, released under Elseworlds, a DC Comics imprint that published out-of-continuity alternate reality stories, as Hayley Fitzpatrick. In 1999, she became a canonical character with the release of Batman: Harley Quinn.

==== Origin story ====
"Bruce and I [...] were talking about what if there was some sort of surprise to her origin? What if she's not just a hench girl? We came up with the idea that she had been a doctor at Arkham Asylum and the Joker had gotten into her head and worked her into being his follower. ...Then we thought, what if Harley's in the role of the long-suffering girlfriend?"

— Paul Dini about the creation of Mad Love

In February 1994, the one-shot The Batman Adventures: Mad Love recounting Harley's origin was released. Written by Dini and drawn by Timm, the story marks their first comic book collaboration. Mad Love introduces Harley Quinn as a former psychologist named Harleen Quinzel who fell in love with the Joker during her internship at Gotham City's Arkham Asylum and details her transformation into the Joker's villainous accomplice Harley Quinn, as well as the Joker's lack of respect for Harley. Widely considered the definitive Harley Quinn story, Mad Love added dimensions to the character, with Dini introducing Harley Quinn's motivations as well as establishing her as a tragic and sympathetic figure. The story received wide praise and won the Eisner and Harvey awards for Best Single Issue in the same year and was later adapted into an episode of the same name in The New Batman Adventures in 1999.

==== Name origin ====
Mad Love establishes Harley Quinn's full name to be Harleen Frances Quinzel. "Harleen Frances" was taken from Sorkin's first and middle name, Arleen Frances, while "Quinzel" came from one of Dini's former Emerson College instructors, who was surnamed Quenzel.

==== Introduction to mainstream DC continuity ====
Harley Quinn was adapted into the mainstream DC Universe with the 1999 one-shot graphic novel Batman: Harley Quinn, written by Dini and illustrated by Yvel Guichet, which put her origin in the middle of the Batman: No Man's Land story line. Dini changed Harley and the Joker's relationship to be darker to match the Joker's character in the comics; in the story, the Joker attempts to kill Harley at the first opportunity. Harley's immunity to toxins and enhanced strength and agility, which were gained from a special formula created by Poison Ivy, were carried over from Batman: The Animated Series, with Dini stating that they would give her a sort of "physical edge" over Batman and other heroes.

=== First ongoing series ===
"[The series] is an interesting assignment because the main character is a) insane and b) a criminal, and both of these things are pretty essential to the character, so we don't want to get rid of either of them. [...] [We] hammered out a direction for the book which [...] will establish a motivation and agenda for Harley. Depending on the storyline, she will be on the side of the angels sometimes, and on the side of the demons and devils on others. Like most great crime characters, she's not concerned with the law. What concerns her is something totally different. What that is will be revealed as the first half dozen issues progress".

— Karl Kesel, 2000

While pursuing new assignments at DC Comics' offices in New York City, Karl Kesel was approached by former DC editor Matt Idelson to create a pitch for Harley Quinn's first ongoing series, which Kesel accepted, being a fan of the character after having read Mad Love. Kesel chose Terry Dodson as the artist for the series, whose art Kesel thought complemented the character's cartoonish roots and worldview. Kesel called Dodson and asked him if he was interested on working on the comic, to which Dodson agreed, and the two worked for a month on their proposal for the series, which was to make a comic about "love gone horribly, terribly wrong". The proposal was accepted by DC Comics, and the pair began work on the series, with Kesel and Dodson both being involved in the storytelling, and Dodson bringing in his wife, Rachel Dodson, to ink. Kesel's run on the series began being published in December 2000, and was about Harley Quinn leaving the Joker and becoming a solo criminal, alongside a supporting cast of henchmen named the Quinntets. Because of underwhelming sales, his 25-issue run ended in December 2002, and DC decided to change the creative team; the series was given to writer A.J. Lieberman and artists Mike Huddleston and Troy Nixey by Idelson, and took on a grittier and darker direction, contrasting Kesel's run. The decision renewed interest in the character, but the sales remained lackluster and the series was cancelled in 2003.

=== Gotham City Sirens ===
After years of scarce appearances in comics, Harley Quinn resurfaced in a leading role in July 2009 with Gotham City Sirens, a team-up title created by Dini. The series brought together Batman's most popular female villains, Harley Quinn, Catwoman, and Poison Ivy, in an unstable alliance. The series also expanded on Harley Quinn's background and early life; in Gotham City Sirens #7, Dini established the character's hometown being Brooklyn, based on her accent and also introduced her dysfunctional family, with her swindling father being described as the main reason for her pursuing psychology.

The first several issues of Gotham City Sirens were written by Dini and illustrated by Guillem March. Other creatives who worked for the series include writers Tony Bedard and Peter Calloway, and artists David López, Andres Guinaldo, Peter Nguyen, Jeremy Haun, and Ramon Bachs. The series was cancelled in August 2011 for The New 52, DC Comics' relaunch of their entire comic line.

=== The New 52 ===
==== Suicide Squad ====
"One thing that we're trying to show with her, and I don't think it gets played with enough with Harley, is here's a woman who was a very intelligent and very manipulative doctor. We're trying to play up that quality. She is crazy, but there is something behind the madness. In the new DCU maybe everyone doesn't get shipped off to Arkham Asylum. Some people may have to do hard time and get shipped off to Belle Reve [the prison the Suicide Squad operates out of], and her presence here doesn't mean she hasn't been or won't end up in Arkham. Basically, we needed a bad girl character, and the best bad girl character in the DCU is Harley Quinn".

— Adam Glass, 2011

As part of The New 52 reboot in September 2011, Harley Quinn was reintroduced by Adam Glass as a prominent member of the supervillain team Task Force X in the relaunched Suicide Squad series. The character was heavily redesigned to fit the tone of the book, and was inspired by Harley's designs in the video games Batman: Arkham Asylum and Batman: Arkham City; her color motif was changed to red and blue, her jester costume was replaced with a revealing ensemble consisting of a corset and hot pants, her skin was bleached white, and her previously blonde hair was altered to half-blue and half-red. Her personality had also been depicted to be more violent and psychopathic than her former iteration.

External images
- Art of Harley's New 52 redesign, from a presentation in 2011's San Diego Comic Con.
- The controversial cover artwork for Suicide Squad (vol. 4) #1, which introduced Harley Quinn's revealing look for the relaunched title, art by Ryan Benjamin.

In the series, Glass separated Harley Quinn from the Joker and explored her "becom[ing] her own person", with the Suicide Squad becoming a family to her; Glass said: "Harley's always wanted to belong to something. And if not Joker, then the team – and she's finding herself in all this. She's finding her place in the world, that she's not just a sidekick".

Suicide Squad was canceled in April 2014 to coincide with the conclusion of the "Forever Evil" storyline.

==== New origin ====
In the seventh issue of Suicide Squad, Glass revised Harley Quinn's origin story, making it reflect the Joker's origins. In the story, the Joker takes Harleen Quinzel to the chemical plant where he originated and pushes her into a vat of chemicals against her will, which bleaches her skin and drives her insane, resulting in her transformation to Harley Quinn. This origin was received negatively by fans, who felt that its removal of Harley Quinn's choice to become the Joker's accomplice willingly, as depicted in her previous origin stories, took out an essential part of her character.

==== Second ongoing series ====
Textless cover art of the second series' first issue featuring Harley Quinn's roller derby-inspired costume, art by Amanda Conner and Paul Mounts. Harley Quinn co-creator Bruce Timm said of the design: "I really like Amanda's design a lot because it's modern and a little bit punk rock, but it's really fun without being trashy. I think the whole roller-derby look is really fun because it's tough but it's still playful. It's not...It's not skanky".

Harley Quinn's second ongoing series, written by husband and wife Jimmy Palmiotti and Amanda Conner, with the interior art illustrated by Chad Hardin and John Timms, explored Harley Quinn leaving Gotham City and starting her own life in her hometown of Brooklyn, depicting her as a landlord in Coney Island, where she shares an apartment building with a supporting cast of "sideshow freaks". Considered to be the most defining writers to work on the character since Dini and Timm, Palmiotti and Conner reinvented Harley Quinn as an antihero who has left her controlling relationship with the Joker behind.

In contrast to Harley Quinn's depiction in Glass' Suicide Squad, Palmiotti and Conner wrote Harley Quinn with a lighthearted, cartoonish, and humorous tone. Her costume has also been changed with a roller derby-inspired costume designed by Conner, which incorporates Conner's favorite aspects of Harley Quinn's early costume and her costume in Glass' run of Suicide Squad. The series also brought back Harley Quinn's red and black motif.

The series began being published in November 2013, starting with Harley Quinn #0, which brought together 17 comic book artists, including Harley Quinn co-creator Bruce Timm, to illustrate a fourth wall-breaking story about Harley thinking of the artists that could illustrate her in her own comic book series. The rest of the series details Harley Quinn's adventures in Coney Island with her supporting cast. In Harley Quinn #25, Palmiotti and Conner reunited Harley Quinn with the Joker; the story depicts Harley Quinn returning to Gotham City to confront the Joker and end their relationship.

With Harley Quinn's longtime friend Poison Ivy being a recurring character in the series, Palmiotti and Conner built on their relationship and hinted at romantic feelings between the two characters; Poison Ivy is shown kissing Harley Quinn multiple times throughout the series, and a sexual relationship between them was alluded to in issue #25. When asked regarding their relationship in a Twitter Q&A, Palmiotti and Conner replied: "Yes, they are girlfriends without the jealousy of monogamy".

The New 52 Harley Quinn series received positive reception, and was also one of DC Comics' top-selling series, inspiring multiple spin-offs. The series was ended for the DC Rebirth relaunch of DC's titles.

==== Controversies ====
The cover of the first issue of the New 52 Suicide Squad title drew controversy for its sexual depiction of Harley Quinn. This also caused some fans of the character to send Adam Glass hate mail and personal threats.

In September 2013, DC Comics announced an art contest entitled "Break into comics with Harley Quinn!", in which contestants were to draw Harley in one of four different suicide scenarios. This contest drew controversy not only because it was announced close to National Suicide Prevention Week, but also because of the sexualized portrayal of Harley Quinn in the fourth scenario, in which the character attempts suicide while naked in her bathtub, which was highly criticised. The American Foundation for Suicide Prevention, American Psychiatric Association, and National Alliance on Mental Illness all responded to the controversy in an emailed group statement to the Huffington Post: "We are disappointed that DC Comics has decided to host a contest looking for artists to develop ways to depict suicide attempts by one of its main villains – Harley Quinn". After seeing the reactions to the contest, DC Comics apologized, saying they should have made it clear it was a dream sequence that was not supposed to be taken seriously. In the final version, the bathtub scene was cut and replaced with Harley Quinn sitting on a rocket while flying in space.

=== DC Rebirth ===
DC's June 2016 relaunch of its entire monthly comics line, DC Rebirth, the character appeared in both the one-shot issue Suicide Squad: Rebirth #1 (October 2016), with a design that included design included pink and blue dyed hair tips and a jacket inspired by Margot Robbie's portrayal of the character in the 2016 film Suicide Squad, a change established in the last issues of her New 52 series.

Harley Quinn returned as a regular character in the relaunched Suicide Squad series, written by Rob Williams. The series was canceled in January 2019.

Harley Quinn's relaunched ongoing series is a direct continuation of the former, with Conner and Palmiotti still writing for the character, and Hardin and Timms illustrating the interior art. After having written 64 issues of Harley Quinn's ongoing series, Conner and Palmiotti's five-year run ended with the 34th issue of the series in December 2017, with writer Frank Tieri and artist Inaki Miranda taking over the title. Tieri's run on the series ended with the series' 42nd issue, followed by a two-issue storyline written by Christopher Sebela and illustrated by Mirka Andolfo. By issue #45 in July 2018, Sam Humphries was the new writer for the series, with John Timms returning to provide art. The series ended in August 2020.

==== Harley Loves Joker ====
In 2017, Harley Quinn co-creator Paul Dini wrote a backup feature for Harley Quinn's Rebirth monthly series entitled Harley Loves Joker, co-written by Palmiotti and illustrated by Bret Blevins, which ran for 9 issues. The story brought back Harley Quinn's classic characterization and focuses on her past with the Joker. Unlike her characterization in Batman: The Animated Series, Dini and Palmiotti wrote Harley Quinn in the story as less of a "doormat", with Harley Quinn and Joker being on equal footing in their relationship. The story concluded with the two-part limited series of the same name, which also expanded on Harley Quinn's past as a former intern in animal research at S.T.A.R. Labs, where she met her pet hyenas Bud and Lou. In the second part of the story, Dini and Palmiotti explained Harley Quinn's change in costume, establishing the character's modern design as a reflection of her having left her relationship with the Joker.

=== Infinite Frontier ===
Concept art for Harley Quinn's Infinite Frontier design by Riley Rossmo, which combines his favorite aspects of Harley's classic jester getup and more recent designs.

In DC's 2021 relaunch of its monthly comics titles, Infinite Frontier, Harley Quinn is moved back to Gotham City as a superheroine, where she frequently interacts with and aids the Batman family, and she is given a new design by Riley Rossmo. Harley Quinn's fourth ongoing series, written by Stephanie Phillips and illustrated by Rossmo, depicts her "actively looking to make up for her past sins", alongside a former Joker henchman named Kevin. Harley Quinn also has a prominent role in the "Fear State" crossover event.

In January 2022, Phillips confirmed Harley would be resuming her previous career as a psychologist.

== Characterization ==
=== Powers, abilities, and equipment ===
Harley Quinn possesses multiple superhuman abilities, having won a gymnastics scholarship at Gotham City's Gotham State University. Following her transition to the main DC canon in 1999, Harley Quinn was established as having immunity to toxins and enhanced strength, agility, durability, and reflexes, which she received after having been injected with a serum concocted by Poison Ivy. "Vengeance Unlimited, Part Five" (Harley Quinn vol. 1 #30) revealed that it also gave her the ability to breathe underwater.

Harley Quinn is skilled in using various weapons, often employing weaponized clown-themed gag items, including pop guns, rubber chickens, and a gun that shoots a boxing glove, as well as oversized pistols and mallets, the latter being her signature weapon. Other weapons she uses include: unconventional weapons, such as a baseball bat; explosive weapons such as bazookas, customized bombs, and dynamites; firearms, such as pistols, assault rifles, and machine guns; Harley Quinn also has a pair of pet hyenas, Bud and Lou, which she can order to attack her opponents.

Despite being mentally unstable and sometimes distracted, Harley is highly intelligent. Her intellect extends to her psychological, tactical and deception abilities, but she does not stand out for particular strategic or scientific skills and often remains subordinate to the Joker, who between the two is the genius and the inventor. Harleen Quinzel earned a bachelor's degree in psychology and as a former Arkham psychologist, was highly qualified in psychoanalysis, criminology, and forensic psychiatry. While not on par with Joker, she is still an expert tactician, deceiver and escapologist, and still shows traces of her psychological experience. Harley Quinn is the only person besides the Joker to concoct Joker Venom, the Joker's signature weapon, and is shown to have reverse-engineered its formula and developed an antitoxin. She also has an indomitable pathological will.

Just like Poison Ivy, sometimes and not as much, Harley uses her feminine charm to attract men but only to manipulate them. Unlike the Joker, she is able to simulate sanity, thus being able to pretend to be a "normal" person. In this way, she disguised herself as a security guard, a lawyer and even Poison Ivy and Batgirl.

=== Bud and Lou ===
Bud and Lou are a pair of spotted hyenas and the pets of Harley Quinn. Their names are references to the comedy duo of Bud Abbott and Lou Costello. Originally created for Batman: The Animated Series alongside Harley Quinn, Bud and Lou have since appeared in other forms of media following their debut. An alternate hyena pet, named Bruce, after Bruce Wayne, appears in the 2020 film Birds of Prey.

=== Romantic interests ===
Harley Quinn has had several love interests, the most notable being the Joker and Poison Ivy. Other love interests include Mason Macabre, a character created by Conner and Palmiotti. Plastic Man was initially intended to be a love interest for Harley Quinn by Kesel, but was not approved by DC.

==== The Joker ====
"So Harley in her earlier incarnation really felt like she was the one for the Joker, that she could catch him and cure him and bring him back to humanity. But actually, in the process, she lost hers. Before she knew it she had fallen head-over-heels in love with him. I think initially he was looking to play her and get what he could out of her, and then realized he had opened Pandora's box and this woman in her madness could match him at just about anything he does. I think he finds that, in some ways, very sexy and attractive. But he's not really set up to love in the way a regular person is. I think there are sparks and intensity and weird passion of a sort to their relationship, but I would not call it a loving relationship in the traditional sense".

— Paul Dini, 2017

The Joker is Harley Quinn's former lover. Harley's solo comics often explore her former association with the Joker through "flashbacks of their past exploits, present-day conflicts", or through Harley as she "laments his absence". Harley often refers to him as "Mistah J" and "Puddin'".

Their relationship is known for its intensely codependent nature, first established in Harley's first origin story Mad Love, where-in the Joker habitually dismisses Harley/leaves her behind when in danger, and Harley always returns to him. In the 1999 one-shot comic Batman: Harley Quinn, the Joker decides to kill Harley, after admitting that he does care for her, that their relationship is romantic, and that these feelings prevent him from fulfilling his purpose. Dini describes their relationship as emotionally abusive, and empathizes with Harley's feelings of abandonment, with Dini basing most of Harley's dialogue on his past experiences.

The Joker's controlling and codependent relationship with Harley Quinn has been analyzed as a means of the Joker reinforcing his own belief in his power in a world where he may be killed or neutralized by another villain or Batman. Joker mirrors his identity through Harley in her appearance, and even though he may ignore or act indifferent towards her, he continues to try to subject her to his control. When Harley successfully defeats Batman in Mad Love, the Joker, emasculated by his own failure, severely injures her out of fear of what the other villains will think of him; however, while Harley recovers, the Joker sends her flowers, which she accepts, reasserting his control over her.

==== Poison Ivy ====
Harley Quinn and Poison Ivy in "New Roots" from Batman: Urban Legends #1, art by Laura Braga.

Poison Ivy is Harley Quinn's current love interest and best friend, and Harley often refers to her as "Red". Ivy was first introduced as a new friend to Harley by Dini in the 1993 Batman: The Animated Series episode "Harley and Ivy". The episode came from Dini wanting to make Harley a stronger character and write a story where she leaves the Joker; Dini decided to pair her up with Ivy because she was "the strongest contrast to Harley". The two later became close friends within the DC Animated Universe. Dini stated that he could see a romantic relationship between the two happening the more he worked with the two characters, but the impossibility of properly portraying their relationship in a children's cartoon at the time prevented it from happening.

Prior to the New 52 reboot, Ivy is shown as having teamed up on occasion with Harley, with Harley being her best friend and recurring ally. Unlike most villain team-ups, their partnership is based on genuine friendship and mutual respect. Ivy sincerely wants to save Harley from her unhealthy relationship with the Joker. Accordingly, Poison Ivy despises the Joker, and the two exchange vicious banter at every opportunity. In the final storyline of the Gotham City Sirens series, Harley suggests that Ivy may be in love with her, an accusation that stuns her. The following issue has Poison Ivy acknowledge that she may indeed love Harley, but the details of her love are never specified, and the series ended with the New 52 reboot before their relationship could be addressed.

Conner and Palmiotti hinted at a romantic relationship in the New 52 Harley Quinn series, and later confirmed that Harley and Ivy are in a non-monogamous relationship. 2017's Harley Quinn #25 marked their first canonical kiss.

== Fictional character biography ==
=== DC Animated Universe ===
Harley Quinn first appeared in Batman: The Animated Series (1992–1995), voiced by Arleen Sorkin, who subsequently reprised her role in other DC Animated Universe series, including Superman: The Animated Series (1996–2000), The New Batman Adventures (1997–1999), Static Shock (2000–2004), and Justice League (2001–2004), as well as the film Batman Beyond: Return of the Joker (2000).

Originally a career-oriented psychiatrist, Dr. Harleen Quinzel's life took a radical turn when she chose to take an internship at Arkham Asylum for a semester of college. Convinced by the Joker himself to do it, Harleen interviewed him and learned he was abused as a child by his alcoholic father (later learning this backstory to have been one of several different stories he had told to others, some with different details each time), and after more interviews, determined Batman was the primary source of the Joker's anger and was to blame for his actions, but that she also had fallen in love with him. Harleen helped the Joker escape and, renaming herself Harley Quinn, became his sidekick in hopes that she could win his love, going on a crime spree across the United States of America.

After assisting Joker in attempting to assassinate Commissioner James Gordon by planting a bomb at a dinner in his honor, she was subdued by Batman, and subsequently an accomplice in virtually all of Joker's criminal schemes. On occasion, she would be kicked out of Joker's gang when unintentionally upstaging or annoying the Joker, on one of these occasions teaming up with Poison Ivy, with the two becoming close friends and a successful crime duo independently. While imprisoned on her own in Arkham Asylum, Batman offered her a pardon in exchange for helping him track down the Joker after he had stolen a nuclear bomb. The day she is declared rehabilitated and paroled, Harley's hyperactivity and unfamiliarity with the "real" world leads to her accidentally kidnapping someone and being returned to Arkham yet again.

In the 31-episode Gotham Girls web series, Harley joins forces with Poison Ivy and Catwoman in a co-starring role.

After several failed attempts at rehabilitation, Harley returns to the Joker's side. However, after another failed attempt to kill Commissioner Gordon leads the Joker to forget their anniversary, Harley re-examines her life and decides that as Batman was the cause of the Joker's obsession, she should capture and kill him herself, doing so by falsely pretending to have found sanity and luring Batman into a trap. Recognizing Harley to have come closer to killing him than Joker has ever done, Batman tricks her into facilitating his escape by making her call the Joker and tell him what she has done, knowing that he would not allow anyone other than himself to kill Batman, pushing her aside and unknowingly knocking her out a window. Recovering in Arkham, Harley decides that the Joker will never truly love her, before returning to her devotion upon seeing that he has left her a rose in a vase by her bedside table, with a note hoping that she gets better soon. Harley later references having convinced the Joker to attend couple's counseling with her.

In the film Batman Beyond: Return of the Joker, flashbacks reveal Harley's apparent final actions after returning to the Joker again were assisting him in kidnapping Tim Drake and torturing him into insanity to transform him into their son "J.J", so that they can start a family together. She later fought Batgirl who angrily chastised her for even helping Joker commit a heinous act but fell deep into an abyss, leading to the latter presuming her dead, though she survived as depicted in the present, where she appears at the end of the film, revealed to have reformed and become the grandmother of the Jokerz members, the Dee Dee Twins, who address her as "Nana Harley".

=== DC Universe ===
The classic and modern iterations of Harley Quinn. Art by Terry and Rachel Dodson.

Harleen Quinzel was a psychologist at Arkham Asylum, and after meeting the Joker, she became his frequent accomplice, took on the name Harley Quinn, and got into a codependent relationship with him. She eventually splits up with him, and becomes a solo criminal, forming a criminal gang called the Quinntets. Following the Quinntet's dissolution, Harley Quinn moves to Metropolis with her best friend Poison Ivy, where she works as a love columnist in the Daily Planet under the alias Holly Chance. She then moves back to Gotham City, where she then voluntarily incarcerates herself in Arkham. Harley Quinn then spends a year applying for parole, only to see her request systematically rejected by Bruce Wayne, the layman member of Arkham's medical commission. She is kidnapped by Peyton Riley, the new female Ventriloquist, who offers her a job; Harley turns the job down out of respect for the memory of Arnold Wesker, the original Ventriloquist, who attempted to cheer her up during her first week in Arkham while the Joker was still on the loose. She then helps Batman and Commissioner Jim Gordon foil the impostor's plans. Although Riley escapes, Bruce Wayne is impressed with Harley's effort at redemption and agrees with granting her parole. She then briefly joins the Secret Six, then decides to quit.

==== Final Crisis ====
During Countdown to Final Crisis, a reformed Harley Quinn resides in an Amazon-run women's shelter. Having abandoned her jester costume and clown make-up, she now only wears an Amazonian stola or chiton. She befriends the former Catwoman replacement Holly Robinson and then succeeds in persuading her to join her at the shelter, where she is working as an assistant. They are both brought to Themyscira by "Athena" (really Granny Goodness) and begin Amazon training. Holly and Harley then meet the real Athena and encounter Mary Marvel. The group reveals Granny's deception, and Holly, Harley, and Mary follow her as she retreats to Apokolips. Mary finds the Olympian gods, whom Granny had been holding prisoner, and the group frees them. Harley is granted powers by Thalia as a reward. Upon returning to Earth, the powers vanish, and Harley and Holly return to Gotham City.

==== Gotham City Sirens ====
Harley Quinn then joins forces with Poison Ivy (Pamela Isley) and Catwoman (Selina Kyle) in the series Gotham City Sirens. In Gotham City Sirens #7, Harley Quinn visits her family in her hometown of Bensonhurst, Brooklyn, during the holiday season. Harley's father is a swindler who is still in jail, and her brother, Barry, is a loser with dead-end dreams of rock stardom. Her mother, Sharon, wants her to stop the "villain and hero stuff". The dysfunctional, "horrible" experience while visiting family causes her to return home to the Sirens' shared Gotham City hideout where Harley, Catwoman, and Poison Ivy spend the rest of Christmas together. Following several adventures with Catwoman and Ivy, Harley betrays them and breaks into Arkham Asylum, intending to kill the Joker. However, Harley ultimately chooses instead to release the Joker from his cell, and together the two orchestrate a violent takeover of the facility that results in most of the guards and staff members either being killed or taken hostage by the inmates. Harley and the Joker are eventually defeated by Batman and Catwoman, and Harley is last seen being wheeled away while bound in a straitjacket and muzzle. Shortly afterward, Poison Ivy breaks into Harley's cell and attempts to kill her for her betrayal, but instead offers to free her if she helps her kill Catwoman, who had left both of her fellow Sirens behind in Arkham. Harley agrees, and the two set out to trap Catwoman. During the ensuing fight, Catwoman says she saw good in them and only wanted to help. As Batman is about to arrest them, Catwoman helps the two of them escape.

==== The New 52 and DC Rebirth ====
In DC's 2011 relaunch of its entirely monthly comics line, The New 52, Harley, as in her previous incarnations, Harleen Quinzel was still the Joker's psychologist, but before she becomes Harley, the Joker pushes her into a vat of chemicals, bleaching her skin white and driving her insane (this story later revealed as a lie Harley tells herself, having jumped into the vat herself). Harley Quinn is forced to join the Suicide Squad by Amanda Waller. Harley Quinn then leaves Gotham City and moves back to her hometown of Brooklyn and resides in Coney Island.

==== Infinite Frontier ====
In DC's 2021 relaunch, Infinite Frontier, Harley Quinn moves back to Gotham City in an attempt to reestablish herself as a hero, aiding the Batman Family and trying to make up for her past "where she often enabled the Joker".

== Cultural impact ==
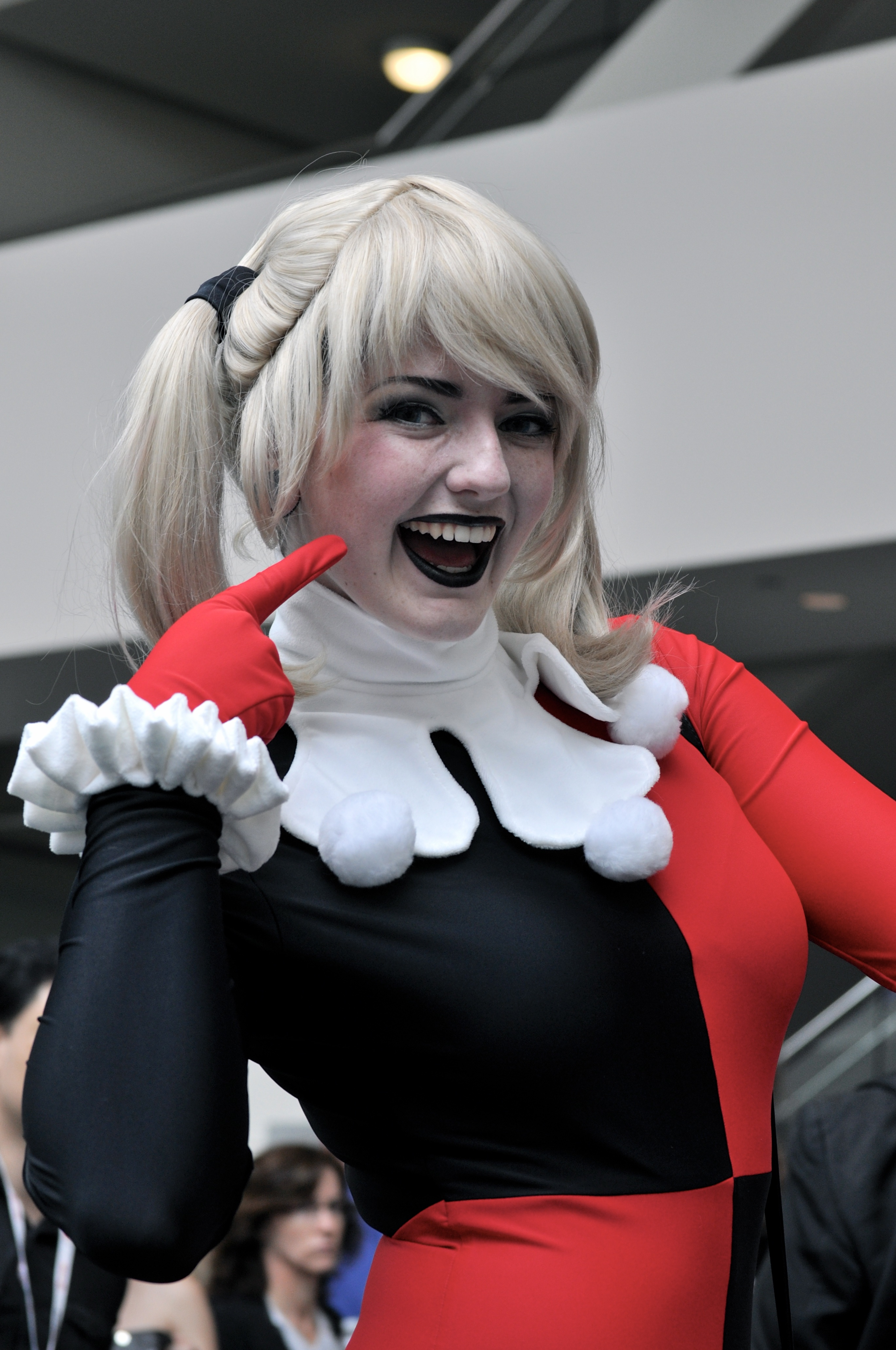
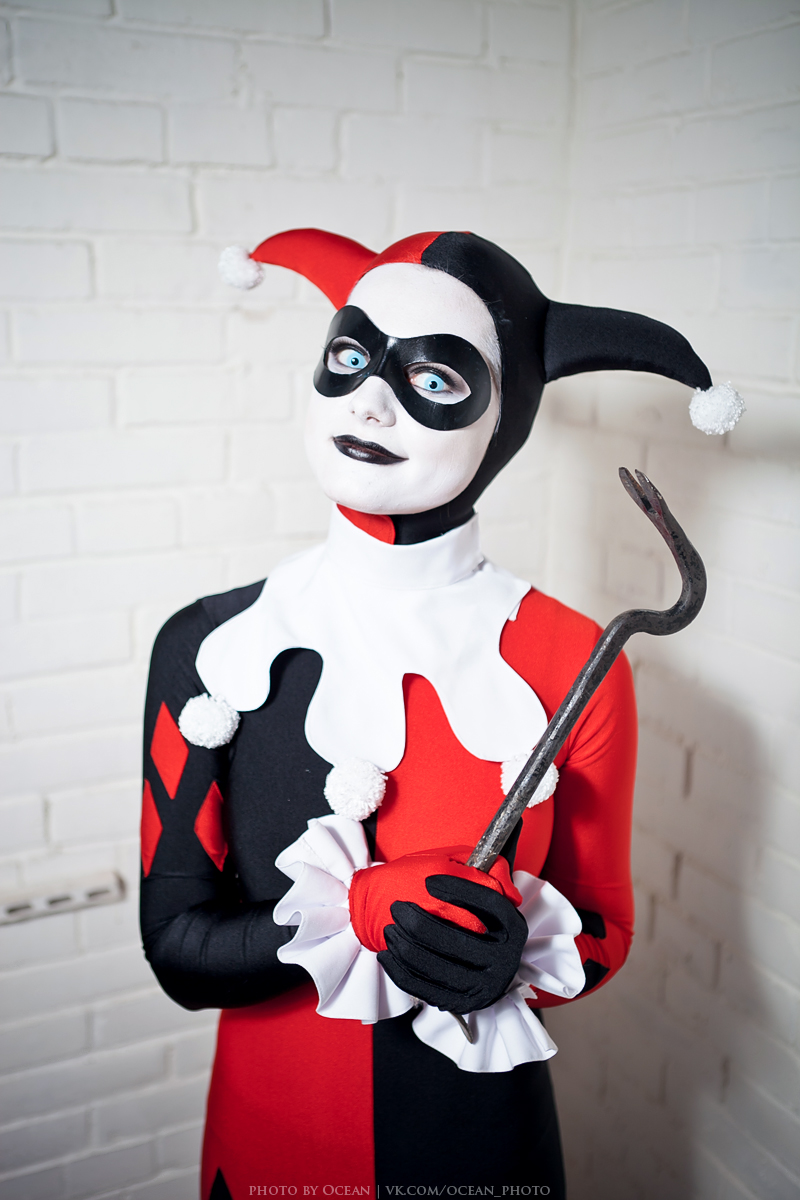
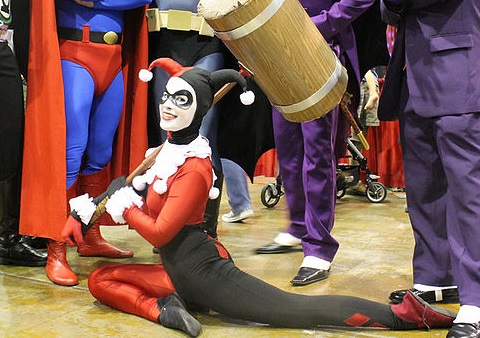
Harley Quinn cosplayers at various comic book conventions

Harley Quinn has become one of DC Comics's most popular characters. The 2016 relaunch of her comic shipped more copies than any other DC Rebirth title and was one of the best-selling comics of the year. DC Comics Publisher Jim Lee refers to Harley Quinn as the fourth pillar in their publishing line, behind Superman, Batman, and Wonder Woman. Harley Quinn currently stars in four separate ongoing series — three eponymous titles and Suicide Squad. Only Batman and Superman have comparable numbers of monthly appearances, making Harley Quinn the most prominent and profitable female character. Kevin Kiniry, vice-president of DC Collectibles, says Harley Quinn is always a top-seller and she "can go toe-to-toe with Batman and the Joker as one of the most fan-requested and sought-after characters". In 2016, Harley Quinn's Halloween costume ranked as the most popular costume in both the United States and the United Kingdom and it remains a popular subject for cosplay. To celebrate the character, DC Comics declared the month of February to be Harley Quinn Month and published 22 Harley Quinn variant covers across their line of comic books. IGN's 2009 list of the Top 100 Comic Book Villains of All Time ranked Harley Quinn as #45. She was ranked 16th in Comics Buyer's Guide's 2011 "100 Sexiest Women in Comics" list. Joker voice actor Mark Hamill attributes the success of Harley Quinn to Sorkin's performance in Batman: The Animated Series. On Twitter, he stated: "In the script she was just an unnamed Joker "hench-wench" [with] no discernible personality. When [Sorkin] began reading her lines in that unforgettable voice so poignant [and] full of heart I nearly fell off my chair! She brought SO much more than was on the page [and] a legend was born".

== Other versions ==
- An alternate universe version of the character appears in Batman: Thrillkiller. This version is a schoolgirl named Hayley Fitzpatrick who aids a female version of the Joker called Bianca Steeplechase.
- Harley Quinn appears in Batman/The Spirit.
- An alternate universe version of Harley Quinn appears in Joker and Batman: Damned.
- An alternate universe version of Harley Quinn from Earth-3 appears in Countdown to Final Crisis.
- An alternate universe version of the character named Yo-Yo appears in Flashpoint.
- Harley Quinn appears in Batman/Teenage Mutant Ninja Turtles.
- Harley Quinn and her successor, Marian Drews, appear in Batman: White Knight.
- An alternate universe version of Harley Quinn appears in DC Comics Bombshells.
- In the Marvel Comics series Gwenpool Strikes Back, a version of Gwen Poole based on Harley Quinn is introduced as a member of the GwenHive.
- An alternate universe version of Harley Quinn appears in DCeased.
- Two versions of Harleen Quinzel appear in an alternate universe; one was a victim of Owlman, and another is an antihero called the Red Hood.
- An alternate universe version of Harley Quinn appears in Absolute Batman. This version is the leader of the Red Hood Gang and an ally of Batman. She has been shown to be the daughter of Jack Grimm (Absolute Joker) in her origin, which is the reason for her hatred against him.
- Harley Quinn appears in the Injustice: Gods Among Us prequel comic.
- An alternate version of Harley Quinn appears in Batman '66.
- An alternate version of Harley Quinn appears in Batman '89.

== In other media ==
=== Television ===
==== Live action ====
- Harley Quinn appears in Birds of Prey, portrayed by Mia Sara.
- Harley Quinn makes a cameo appearance in the Arrow episode "Suicide Squad", portrayed by Cassidy Alexa and voiced by Tara Strong. Series star Stephen Amell revealed in an interview that Quinn was intended to appear in the second-season finale episode "Unthinkable", but was cut due to time. Producer Andrew Kreisberg revealed that there were plans for the character to appear, but Willa Holland said they had been axed due to the Suicide Squad film.
- A character loosely inspired by Harley Quinn named Ecco appears in Gotham, portrayed by Francesca Root-Dodson.

==== Animation ====
- An animated series starring Harley Quinn and Poison Ivy was in development in 2001, but never made it past early pre-production. Character designs for the series were done by Shane Glines.
- Harley Quinn appears in The Batman, voiced by Hynden Walch. This version is a former television pop psychiatrist who ends up being seduced by the Joker, sharing a normal relationship.
- Harley Quinn appears in Batman: The Brave and the Bold, voiced by Meghan Strange.
- Harley Quinn makes primarily non-speaking cameo appearances in Teen Titans Go!, voiced by Tara Strong in the episode "Jam".
- Harley Quinn appears in Justice League Action, voiced again by Tara Strong. This version previously worked at S.T.A.R. Labs and cared for Titano prior to his transformation.
- Harley Quinn appears in DC Super Hero Girls (2019), voiced again by Tara Strong. This version is a fangirl of the Joker and Barbara Gordon's best friend from Gotham City, though they are initially unaware of each other's secret identities. While initially living in Gotham, she moves to Metropolis in "#Frenemies", and becomes friends and partners with Catwoman, Poison Ivy, Giganta, Star Sapphire, and Livewire, while also becoming an enemy of the DC Super Hero Girls.
- Harley Quinn appears in Robot Chicken, voiced again by Tara Strong.
- Harley Quinn appears in Batwheels, voiced by Chandni Parekh.
- Harley Quinn appears in Batman: Caped Crusader, voiced by Jamie Chung. This version is Asian-American and unconnected to the Joker, and is shown to be motivated primarily by a contempt for capitalism and the rich. She works as a psychiatrist to many wealthy and powerful clients, including Bruce Wayne, while using the costumed persona of "Harley Quinn" to kidnap, blackmail, and brainwash them to donate their wealth to various charitable causes and undergo psychological conditioning to become more empathetic.
- Harley Quinn appears in Suicide Squad Isekai, voiced by Anna Nagase and Karlii Hoch in Japanese and English, respectively.

===== Harley Quinn =====
- Harley Quinn appears in a self-titled animated series, voiced by Kaley Cuoco. It focuses on Harley as she attempts to become a solo criminal and step out of the Joker's shadow with the help of Poison Ivy and her crew of supervillains. Additionally, Harley appears in the spin-off Kite Man: Hell Yeah!.

=== Film ===
==== Live action ====
- Harley Quinn was initially set to appear in Batman Unchained, the fifth film planned for the original Batman film series. She was to be featured as the daughter of the Joker (Jack Nicholson) who allies herself with the Scarecrow to get revenge on Batman for her father's death. However, due to the critical and commercial failure of Batman & Robin, this film was cancelled.
- The Batman: Arkham version of Harley Quinn makes a cameo appearance in Ready Player One.
- Harley Quinn appears in Joker: Folie à Deux, portrayed by Lady Gaga. This version is Harleen "Lee" Quinzel, a psychology student posing as a patient at Arkham State Hospital who becomes obsessed with the Joker and forms a deadly romantic relationship with her idol. She eventually becomes pregnant with Arthur's child and leaves upon learning Arthur has disowned the Joker persona, leaving the future of their child unknown. Describing Quinzel, Todd Phillips noted how this version of the character is manipulative, amoral and "more grounded", with the film ignoring the character's classic mannerisms and style to fit into the world created in Joker (2019).

===== DC Extended Universe =====
Margot Robbie as Harley Quinn in Suicide Squad (2016)

Dr. Harleen Quinzel / Harley Quinn appears in films set in the DC Extended Universe, portrayed by Margot Robbie.

- The character debuted in the 2016 film Suicide Squad. Paul Dini, the creator of Harley Quinn, said Robbie "nailed" her role.
- Harley Quinn appears in the 2020 spin-off film Birds of Prey, which Robbie also produced. On Robbie's portrayal of the character in the film, Dini commented: "I think they really got the essence of the character down, and they made her quite a lot of fun and appealing in so many ways. She's not totally the animated version, and it's not totally the Jimmy Palmiotti and Amanda Conner version, but it kind of borrows from all of them and creates its own reality and its own fun. There are so many moments in that movie that I just think are wonderful. [...] When I saw her running, laughing hysterically, pushing a shopping cart full of Peeps, I said, "That's my girl". All those little impish things that she did in the movie – sitting down eating cereal, watching Tweety Bird cartoons, and just kind of skipping through life cheerfully oblivious of the devastation she's caused – that's Harley".
- Harley Quinn appears in The Suicide Squad (2021), a standalone sequel to Suicide Squad.

==== Animation ====
- Harley Quinn makes a non-speaking cameo appearance in Justice League: The New Frontier.
- An alternate universe version of Harley Quinn appears in Justice League: Crisis on Two Earths. This version is a monkey owned by the Jester.
- Harley Quinn appears in Batman: Assault on Arkham, voiced again by Hynden Walch.
- A darker version of Harley Quinn, named Harlequin, appears in Justice League: Gods and Monsters, voiced again by Tara Strong. She is a psychotic serial killer who kidnaps, murders, and turns people into human-sized dolls to create a doll family to play with. After already killing a man (father), a woman (mother), a child (little brother), and an old woman (grandma), she attempts to complete her "family" with the murder of a young woman (older sister) but is stopped by the Batman of this universe, Kirk Langstrom, who kills Harlequin by biting her throat and drinking her blood.
- Harley Quinn appears in Lego DC Comics Super Heroes: Justice League – Gotham City Breakout, voiced again by Tara Strong.
- Harley Quinn makes a non-speaking cameo appearance in Batman: The Killing Joke, via photographs.
- Harley Quinn appears in Batman and Harley Quinn, voiced by Melissa Rauch. She works as a waitress after breaking up with the Joker again, and helps Batman and Nightwing stop Poison Ivy from killing all life on Earth. Afterwards, she begins hosting Ask Dr. Quinzel, a reality show where contestants undergo an obstacle course to win a year of therapy.
- Dr. Harleen Quinzel appears in Batman vs. Two-Face, voiced by Sirena Irwin. This version is Hugo Strange's assistant, who reciprocates the Joker's flirting. In a Blu-ray exclusive bonus scene, Quinzel, dressed as Harley Quinn, breaks the Joker out of prison.
- Harley Quinn appears in DC Super Heroes vs. Eagle Talon, voiced by Kang Ji-young.
- Harley Quinn appears in Scooby-Doo! & Batman: The Brave and the Bold, voiced again by Tara Strong.
- A feudal Japanese version of Harley Quinn appears in Batman Ninja, voiced by Rie Kugimiya and Tara Strong in Japanese and English, respectively.
- Harley Quinn makes a non-speaking cameo appearance in Teen Titans Go! To the Movies.
- Harley Quinn appears in Batman vs. Teenage Mutant Ninja Turtles, voiced again by Tara Strong.
- Dr. Harleen Quinzel makes a non-speaking cameo appearance in Batman: Death in the Family.
- Harley Quinn makes a non-speaking cameo appearance in Space Jam: A New Legacy.
- Harley Quinn appears in Injustice, voiced by Gillian Jacobs.
- Harley Quinn appears in Teen Titans Go! & DC Super Hero Girls: Mayhem in the Multiverse, voiced again by Tara Strong.
- Harley Quinn appears in Scooby-Doo! and Krypto, Too!, voiced again by Tara Strong.
- The Batman Ninja version of Harley Quinn appears in Batman Ninja vs. Yakuza League, voiced again by Rie Kugimiya in Japanese and Karlii Hoch in English.

===== DC Animated Movie Universe =====
- Yo-Yo appears in Justice League: The Flashpoint Paradox, voiced by Hynden Walch.
- Harley Quinn appears in Suicide Squad: Hell to Pay, voiced again by Tara Strong. This version is a member of the Suicide Squad whose appearance is inspired by her counterpart from The New 52.
- Harley Quinn appears in Batman: Hush and Justice League Dark: Apokolips War, voiced again by Hynden Walch. In the latter film, she becomes the new leader of the Suicide Squad following Amanda Waller's death from cancer and seeks to avenge the Joker after Batman kills him while under Darkseid's control.

===== Lego Batman =====
- Harley Quinn appears in Lego Batman: The Movie – DC Super Heroes Unite, an adaptation of the video game Lego Batman 2: DC Super Heroes, with Laura Bailey reprising her role.
- Harley Quinn appears in The Lego Batman Movie, voiced by Jenny Slate.
- Harley Quinn appears in The Lego Movie 2: The Second Part, voiced by Margot Rubin.

=== Web series ===
- Harley Quinn appears in the Gotham Girls (2000–2002), voiced again by Arleen Sorkin.
- Harley Quinn appears in the Batman Black and White motion comics, voiced by Janyse Jaud.
- An alternate universe version of Harleen Quinzel appears as Harlequin in the Justice League: Gods and Monsters Chronicles episode "Twisted", voiced again by Tara Strong. This version is a serial killer who makes toys and dolls out of the bodies of her victims.
- Harley Quinn appears in DC Super Hero Girls (2015) and its tie-in films, voiced again by Tara Strong. This version is a student at Super Hero High and roommate of Wonder Woman.

=== Podcasts ===
- Harley Quinn appears in Batman: The Audio Adventures, voiced again by Gillian Jacobs.
- Harley Quinn appears in Harley Quinn and The Joker: Sound Mind, voiced by Christina Ricci.

=== Video games ===
==== DC Animated Universe games ====
- Harley Quinn appears in The Adventures of Batman & Robin, voiced again by Arleen Sorkin.
- Harley Quinn appears in Batman Vengeance, voiced again by Arleen Sorkin.
- Harley Quinn appears in Batman: Rise of Sin Tzu.

==== DC Universe Online ====
Harley Quinn appears as an unlockable character in DC Universe Online, initially reprised by Arleen Sorkin before being replaced by Jen Brown starting in 2016.

==== Lego series ====
- Harley Quinn appears in Lego Batman: The Videogame, voiced by Grey DeLisle. She appears as an enemy of Batman, the first deputy of the Joker, and the second boss of Chapter 3: "The Joker's Return". She is also a playable character in the villain levels, and wields a pistol and her signature giant mallet.
- Harley Quinn appears as a boss and unlockable playable character in Lego Batman 2: DC Super Heroes, voiced by Laura Bailey.
- Harley Quinn appears as an unlockable playable character in Lego Batman 3: Beyond Gotham, voiced again by Tara Strong.
- Harley Quinn appears as a playable character in Lego Dimensions, voiced again by Tara Strong.
- Harley Quinn appears as a playable character in Lego DC Super-Villains, voiced again by Tara Strong. Her design is based on The New 52.
- Harley Quinn appears as a playable character in the "Mayhem Mode" of Lego Batman: Legacy of the Dark Knight, voiced by Elsie Lovelock.

==== Batman: Arkham series ====
Harley Quinn appears in the Batman: Arkham franchise, voiced initially by Arleen Sorkin and subsequently by Tara Strong.

- In Batman: Arkham Asylum, Harley takes control of the eponymous asylum to facilitate the Joker's escape until she is defeated and incarcerated by Batman.
- In Batman: Arkham City, Harley continues to work with the Joker within the eponymous city-prison. Following the Joker's death, Harley watches in shock as Batman carries his corpse out of the Monarch Theater. Harley also appears in the sequel DLC Harley Quinn's Revenge, where she assumes control of the Joker's gang and seeks revenge on Batman for his death.
- Harley Quinn appears in the mobile game Batman: Arkham City Lockdown, a prequel to Arkham City.
- Harleen Quinzel appears in Batman: Arkham Origins, which takes place before her transformation into Harley Quinn. She interviews the Joker at Blackgate Prison and falls in love with him after he confesses his fascination with someone he considers special to him. She later appears among the prison's staff members held hostage by the Joker when he takes over the facility, until she is rescued by Batman.
- Harley returns in Batman: Arkham Knight. Still in charge of the remains of the Joker's gang and vengeful against Batman, she is recruited by the Scarecrow to aid in his plot to kill Batman. Additionally, Harley appears as a playable character and boss in the game's DLC packs.
- Harley appears as an unlockable playable character in the mobile game Batman: Arkham Underworld.
- Harley appears as a playable character in Suicide Squad: Kill the Justice League. Amanda Waller recruits her into the eponymous group to eliminate Brainiac and the brainwashed Justice League members in Metropolis.
- Harleen Quinzel appears in Batman: Arkham Shadow, which takes place several months after the events of Arkham Origins. Still working as a psychiatrist at Blackgate Prison, she clashes with her colleague Jonathan Crane, who is opposed to her idea of helping the prison's inmates through therapy. She later works with Batman to investigate Crane, discovering he is conducting immoral and illegal experiments on patients, leading to his eventual dismissal.

==== Injustice ====
- Harley Quinn appears as a playable character in Injustice: Gods Among Us, voiced again by Tara Strong. An alternate universe version who established the Joker Clan to honor the Joker following his death also appears.
- Harley Quinn appears as a playable character in Injustice 2, voiced again by Tara Strong. She is a main character in the single-player campaign, wherein she serves as an ally of Batman and assists him and the other heroes in combating Brainiac and the Society. Harley is also shown to have completely overcome her feelings for the Joker, aiming to one day be in the right headspace to raise their daughter Lucy, whom she left with her sister.

==== Batman: The Enemy Within ====
- Harley Quinn appears in Batman: The Enemy Within, voiced by Laura Post. This version was driven insane following her father's long bout with mental illness and eventual suicide. Hoping to avoid her father's fate, she joins a criminal organization called the Pact to steal a virus able to cure her hereditary condition. While her role as a former Arkham Asylum psychiatrist is kept intact, Harley's dynamic with the Joker (named "John Doe" in this version) is initially reversed; John is depicted as being infatuated with Harley, who is aware of his feelings and uses them to manipulate him. As the series progresses, John's confidence increases and, depending on the player's choices, he will either aid Bruce Wayne in capturing Harley or transform into the traditional version of the Joker. In the latter outcome, Harley becomes the Joker's girlfriend, and the two use the virus to threaten Gotham City.

==== Other video games ====
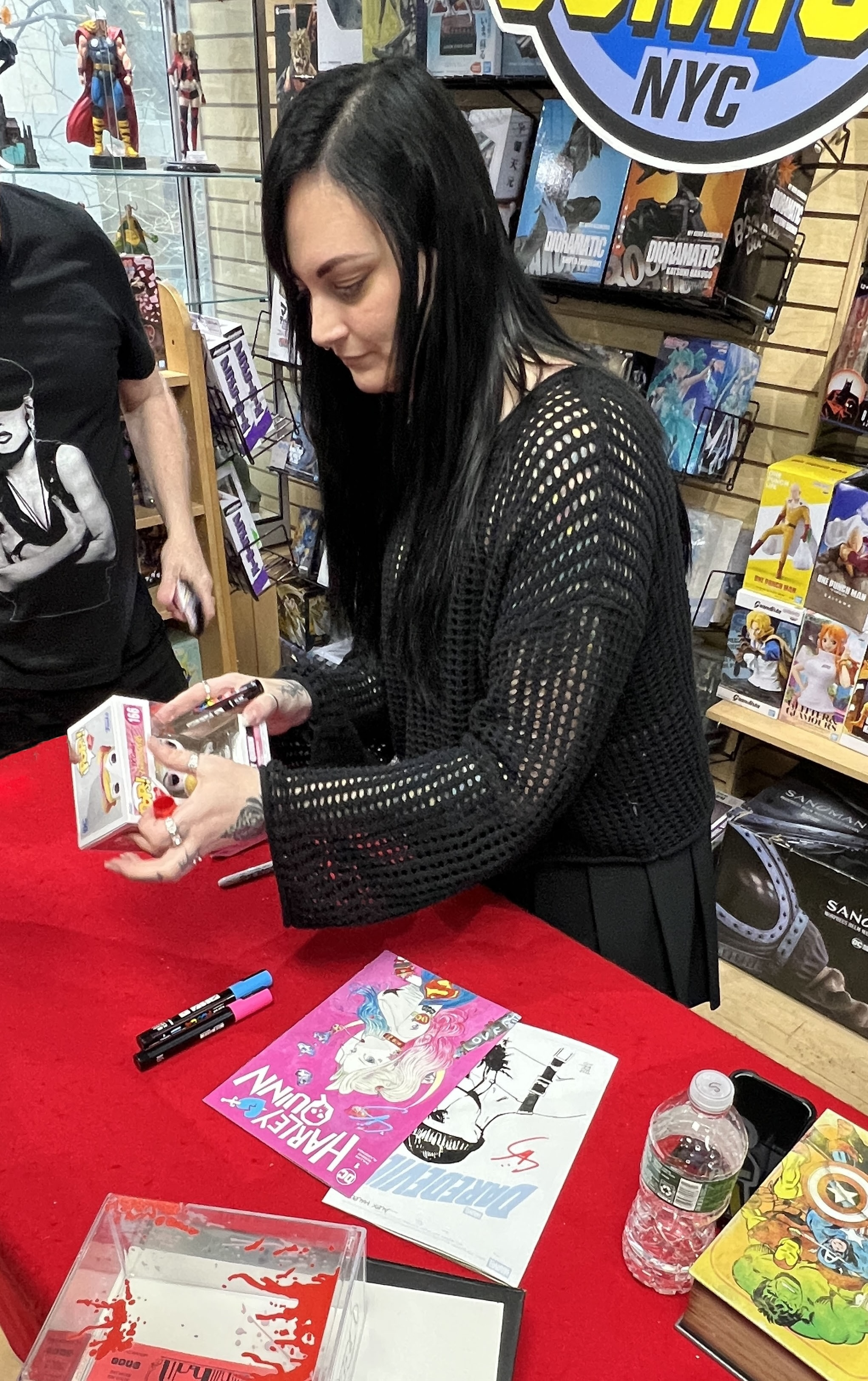
Stephanie Phillips, who wrote the Harley Quinn comics series, autographing an issue of that series and a Funko Pop figure of the character at an April 2026 signing at Midtown Comics in Manhattan

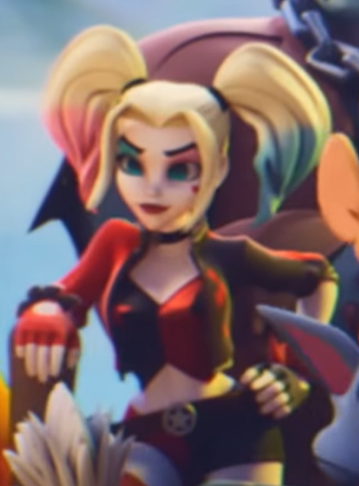
Harley Quinn in the video game MultiVersus

- Harley Quinn appears as a playable character in Infinite Crisis, voiced again by Tara Strong.
- Harley Quinn appears in Scribblenauts Unmasked: A DC Comics Adventure.
- Harley Quinn appears as a playable character in the mobile game, Suicide Squad: Special Ops, based on the 2016 film.
- Harley Quinn appears as a playable character in DC Legends and DC Unchained.
- Harley Quinn appears as a DLC costume for Cassie Cage in Mortal Kombat 11.
- Harley Quinn appears as a playable outfit in Fortnite Battle Royale.
- Harley Quinn appears as a playable character in SINoALICE, voiced by Rie Kugimiya.
- Harley Quinn appears as a playable character in DC Battle Arena, voiced by Kira Buckland.
- Harley Quinn appears as a playable character in MultiVersus, voiced again by Tara Strong.
- Harley Quinn appears in Gotham Knights, voiced by Kari Wahlgren. This version ended her relationship with the Joker and became an informant for Batman, briefly aiding the Gotham Knights before breaking out of Blackgate Penitentiary. She subsequently begins selling neural implants called "ReQ", which allegedly help Gotham's citizens with their poor lives but in reality are a way for Harley to mind-control them. After discovering her scheme, the Knights defeat Harley, and she is arrested.

=== Novels ===
- A novel adaption of Mad Love, written by Pat Cardigan and original co-creator Paul Dini, was published as part of the DC Comic Novels series in November 2018 by Titan Books.
- In 2022, Penguin Random House launched a Harley Quinn line of their young adult DC Icons series, authored by YA author and neuroscientist Rachael Allen.
- Pauline Ketch, a character based on Harley Quinn who goes by the supervillainous alter ego Pretty Polly, appears in The Refrigerator Monologues.

=== Toys and collectibles ===
A number of toys and collectible products of the character have been marketed, alongside busts, multiple Funko Pop figures, 18-inch figures, maquette statues, a Living Dead Doll, and poseable action figures. A number of these figurines have been produced depicting Harley Quinn in the style of the classic animated series, while others have been produced in the style of specific comics artists known for their work with the character, such as Amanda Connor, Babs Tarr, and Joelle Jones. Branded clothing of the character such as hats, robes, and capes have also been sold. In June 2019, DC Collectibles began accepting orders for a life-size, 5 feet, 6 inch-tall fiberglass resin statue of Harley Quinn for release that November at a price of $5,499.99.

== Actresses ==
List indicators

This section includes characters who will appear or have appeared in portrayals by actresses, who are listed chronologically by first portrayal.

- An empty grey cell indicates the character was not in the film, or that the character's official presence has not yet been confirmed.
- ^{V} indicates a voice-only role.

Actor	Animated television	Animated film	Video games	Web series	Live-action television	Live-action film	Live performance	Podcasts	
Actor	Arleen Sorkin	1992–2003^{V}	2000^{V}	1995–2011^{V}	2000–2002^{V}				
Actor	Mia Sara					2002			
Actor	Hynden Walch	2004–2006^{V}	2013-2020^{V}						
Actor	Grey DeLisle			2008^{V}					
Actor	Meghan Strange	2010^{V}							
Actor	Janyse Jaud				2008–2009^{V}				
Actor	Poppy Tierney							2011, 2012	
Actor	Tara Strong	2013–2023^{V}	2011–2022^{V}	2012–2023^{V}	2015–2018^{V}	2014^{V}			
Actor	Laura Bailey		2013^{V}	2012^{V}					
Actor	Cassidy Alexa					2014			
Actor	Margot Robbie						2016–2021		
Actor	Melissa Rauch		2017^{V}						
Actor	Sirena Irwin		2017^{V}						
Actor	Kang Ji-young		2017^{V}						
Actor	Jenny Slate		2017^{V}						
Actor	Rie Kugimiya			2017^{V}					
Actor	Laura Post			2018^{V}					
Actor	Francesca Root-Dodson					2018–2019 (Note: The character's identity is not given but elements such as their story arc or relationships are consistent.)			
Actor	Margot Rubin		2019^{V}						
Actor	Kaley Cuoco	2019–present^{V}							
Actor	Kira Buckland			2021^{V}					
Actor	Gillian Jacobs		2021^{V}						2021–2022^{V}
Actor	Kari Wahlgren			2022^{V}					
Actor	Christina Ricci								2023^{V}
Actor	Lady Gaga						2024		
Actor	Jamie Chung	2024^{V}							

== See also ==
- Hybristophilia
- List of Batman family enemies
