= Batman: Vengeance =

2001 video game

- North American PlayStation 2 box art
- Developer: Ubi Soft Montreal (Note: Ported to PC by Ubisoft Shanghai)
- Publisher: Ubi Soft
- Producer: Reid Schneider
- Designer: Pierre Rivest
- Programmer: Stéphane Morichère-Matte
- Artists: Hugo Dallaire; Stéphane Belin; Alex Drouin
- Series: Batman
- Platforms: PlayStation 2 Game Boy Advance; GameCube; Xbox; Microsoft Windows
- Release: October 23, 2001: PlayStation 2; NA: October 23, 2001; EU: November 9, 2001 Game Boy Advance; NA: October 30, 2001; EU: November 9, 2001 GameCube; NA: November 18, 2001; EU: May 3, 2002 Xbox; NA: December 18, 2001; EU: March 14, 2002 Windows; NA: September 6, 2002; EU: October 8, 2002
- Genre: Action-adventure
- Mode: Single-player

Batman: Vengeance is a 2001 action-adventure game developed by Ubi Soft Montreal and published by Ubi Soft in conjunction with Warner Bros. Interactive Entertainment. Based on the DC Comics character Batman, it is inspired by the television series The New Batman Adventures and features its voice cast reprising their roles. The game has an original storyline, following Batman as he investigates the apparent demise of his nemesis, the Joker, while contending with other villains and their plots that threaten Gotham City.

Batman: Vengeance was released on October 23, 2001, for the PlayStation 2, with ports for the Game Boy Advance, GameCube, Xbox, and Microsoft Windows releasing over the following months. The game received mixed reviews from critics.

== Gameplay ==
The player controls Batman, mostly from a third-person perspective, as he traverses environments that combine platforming, combat, stealth, puzzles, and occasional vehicle or aerial sequences. Most of the time, the player can run or walk, jump, climb ledges, and use Batman's cape to glide from heights, enabling traversal across rooftops or through the environment. Movement is complemented by a variety of gadgets the player can cycle through, which aid Batman in taking down enemies or navigating the environment; when using a gadget, such as aiming a batarang or Batman's grappling hook, the game switches to a first-person perspective.

In-game screenshot showing Batman fighting a Joker henchman.

Combat in Batman: Vengeance uses a beat 'em up style, requiring the player to chain together melee attacks such as punches, kicks, and blocking; more powerful moves are unlocked as the player progresses through the game. Encounters frequently involve ranged gadget use (to disarm or distract enemies) followed by close-quarters hand-to-hand combat; once foes are incapacitated, Batman must quickly handcuff them to prevent them from getting back up and resuming the fight.

Beyond platforming and combat, the game includes driving and flying segments, where the player gets to control the Batmobile and Batwing, respectively, as well as free-falling sequences, in which Batman must save falling civilians. There are also levels that place emphasis on stealth and puzzle-solving; during these segments, Batman must sneak against walls and peek around corners to avoid detection, or navigate laser-fence puzzles requiring key cards or codes.

=== Game Boy Advance ===
The Game Boy Advance version of Batman: Vengeance alternates between several different gameplay styles, primarily 2D side-scrolling action platforming for Batman, overhead-view puzzle/action stages for Robin, and occasional driving or flying segments using the Batmobile or Batwing. It presents a hybrid experience, mixing action-platforming, simple combat, gadget use, light puzzles, and occasional driving or flying stages to offer players a fulfilling "Batman experience".

In the side-scrolling stages, the player controls Batman and can walk, run, jump, perform a cape-glide, crouch, climb, and grab ledges or vines when prompted. Combat moves include punches and kicks (alongside a more powerful jump-kick), and the player can also use gadgets such as batarangs, smoke bombs, health sprays, and a grappling hook, which only works when specific on-screen prompts appear. Taking damage depletes a health bar; falling into pits or losing all health results in a game over screen. Checkpoints and unlimited continues can somewhat ease repetition, and there is a password system to resume progress.

Robin's stages diverge from Batman's; played in overhead view, they emphasize puzzle-solving and navigation rather than action. Robin moves boxes to open paths, collects key cards or passwords, and sometimes uses a remote-controlled device (the "Batcrawler") to access areas otherwise unreachable. These overhead levels occasionally include light combat (usually throwing jabs or batarangs), but the focus remains on puzzle-solving.

Interspersed with these are vehicle and flying segments for added variety. Batmobile levels adopt a top-down perspective: the goal is to reach a destination before a timer expires, maneuvering around traffic and obstacles; the Batmobile can sometimes fire an electric projectile to clear certain obstacles. Batwing stages play out as side-scrolling shooters: the screen scrolls automatically, and the player can shoot enemies and employ a limited-use shield (which recharges over time) to avoid taking damage.

After completing the main Story Mode, an Advance Mode becomes available via passwords. In this mode, stages are tweaked, often adding timed objectives and hidden collectibles (such as data disks) to find before reaching the end of the level.

== Plot ==
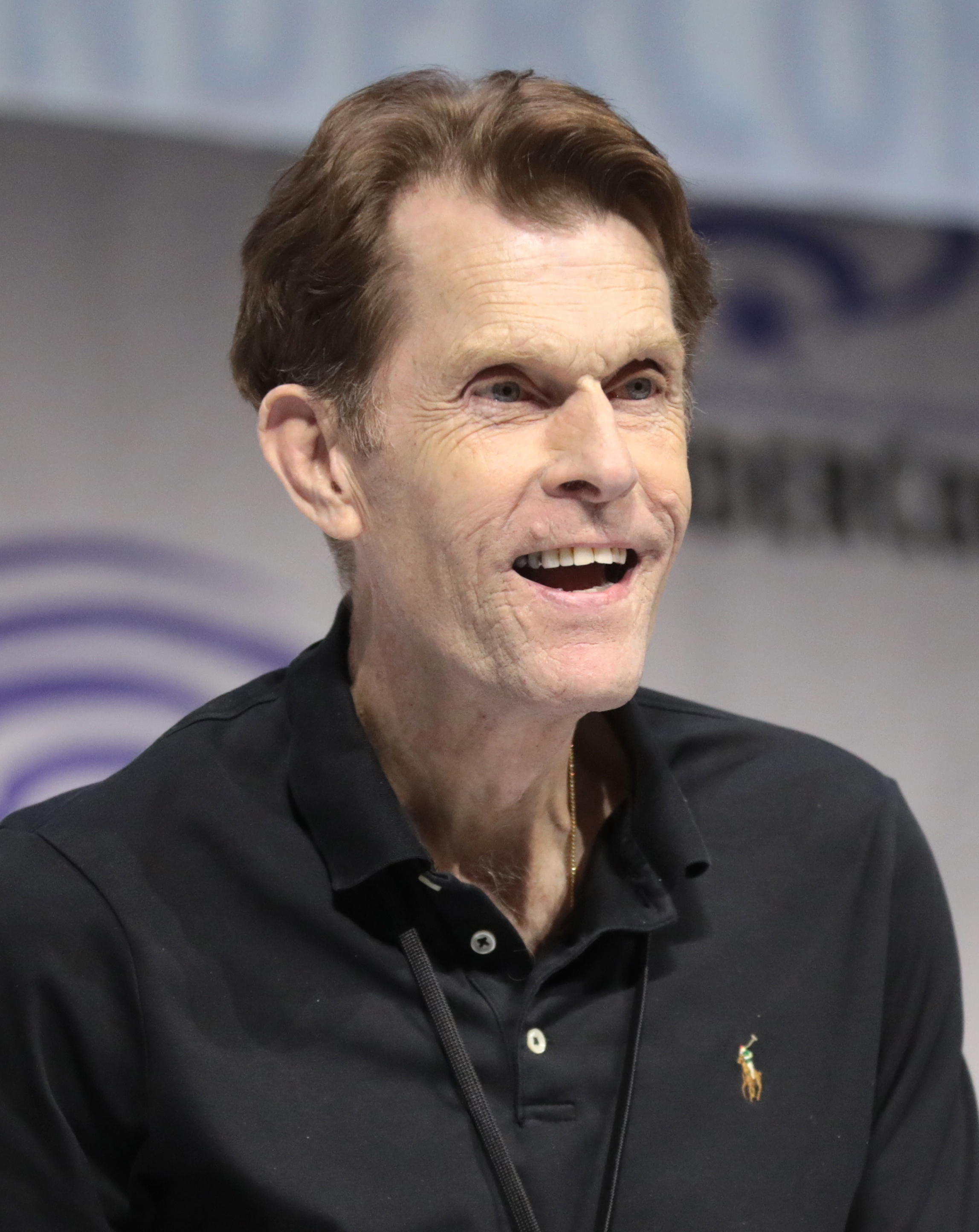
Kevin Conroy (pictured in 2019) reprised his role as Batman from the DC Animated Universe.

Batman saves a woman named Mary from a bomb planted at Gotham Chemicals by the Joker, who is holding her son hostage for ransom. Using a transmitter, Batman tracks the Joker and Mary to a partially demolished Gotham Bridge, where Mary is unmasked as Harley Quinn and the kidnapping scheme is revealed to be a plot to trap Batman. Batman defeats the Joker, but the latter falls off the bridge to his apparent death. Suspicious that the Joker survived, Batman lets Harley escape in order to monitor her using the transmitter.

Batman and Batgirl are later alerted to Mr. Freeze attacking Gotham Industrial Research to kill scientist Isaac Evers, the creator of the miracle drug Promethium for cryogenically frozen people. Freeze seeks revenge against Evers for a promotional Promethium video he believes Evers sent to mock him, due to Freeze having already used the drug on himself and his wife, Nora, to no avail. While pursuing Freeze, Batman uncovers Evers' dealings with the Joker, who funded his research after his government funding was cut because of Promethium's unstable nature. After saving Evers and defeating Freeze, Batman discovers Poison Ivy has created a new species of super-plants infested with deadly worms, and tracks her to the remains of Gotham Chemicals. There, he finds Mayor Hamilton Hill, who explains that Ivy blackmailed him and other wealthy socialites by poisoning them with her worm-infected plants, which were created from a mysterious chemical. Batman defeats Ivy and obtains an antidote to save her victims.

Batman later witnesses the Joker's goons hijacking a blimp and meets with Harley, who informs him that they have been operating on their own since the Joker's supposed death. After foiling their plan to send explosive Joker toys into the city's sewers, Batman finds an abducted Issac Evers. He explains that he had hired the goons to destroy Gotham Industrial for the insurance money, having been unable to collect on the damage left by Freeze without revealing his deals with the Joker; however, the goons turned on him to carry out their plan to destroy Gotham using the toys, and took Evers hostage. As Batman hands Evers over to the police, Commissioner Gordon is hit by a batarang. Framed for the attack, Batman escapes from the police and concludes that Harley is behind everything since the Joker's apparent death. Disguising himself as a drifter to avoid police attention, he investigates the Joker's former hideout and finds evidence hinting at his survival.

After tracking the stolen blimp to the Gotham Gasworks, Batman confronts a still-living Joker, who faked his death to exact his true plan. He reveals that he manipulated Evers, Freeze, Ivy, and Batman himself into aiding his goal to mass-produce a flammable Joker venom developed from Promethium, which he intends to spread throughout the city's sewers. Batman shuts off the pipe network to stop the flow of toxin, while the Joker attempts to escape in the blimp and spread the toxin himself. After subduing Harley, Batman stows aboard the blimp and stops the toxin from being released. As a last resort, the Joker tries to crash the blimp into Gotham, but Batman destroys the blimp and saves the Joker from falling to his death.

In the aftermath, the villains are incarcerated at Arkham Asylum, and Batman meets with an apologetic Gordon, who reveals that Harley's fingerprints were found on the batarang that hit him, clearing Batman's name. After Gordon thanks him for saving Gotham, Batman retreats to look out over the city when the Bat-Signal appears behind him.

== Development ==
Batman: Vengeance took environmental and character designs from The New Batman Adventures. Many voice actors reprised their roles from the show, including Kevin Conroy as Batman, Mark Hamill as the Joker, Tara Strong as Batgirl, Diane Pershing as Poison Ivy, Michael Ansara (in his final acting role) as Mr. Freeze, Efrem Zimbalist Jr. as Alfred Pennyworth, Arleen Sorkin as Harley Quinn, Bob Hastings as Commissioner Gordon, and Lloyd Bochner as Hamilton Hill.

== Reception ==
Reception

Aggregate score
Aggregator	Score				
Aggregator	GBA	GameCube	PC	PS2	Xbox
Metacritic	68/100	70/100	57/100	68/100	70/100

Review scores
Publication	Score				
Publication	GBA	GameCube	PC	PS2	Xbox
Computer Gaming World	N/A	N/A	1.5/5	N/A	N/A
Electronic Gaming Monthly	N/A	N/A	N/A	5.83/10 (Note: Three critics of Electronic Gaming Monthly gave the PlayStation 2 version each a score of 6/10, 5/10, and 6.5/10.)	N/A
EP Daily	8/10	N/A	N/A	7/10	N/A
Game Informer	N/A	6.75/10	N/A	7/10	7/10
GameRevolution	N/A	N/A	N/A	C	N/A
GameSpot	6.7/10	7.4/10	4.5/10	7.4/10	7.4/10
GameSpy	58%	73%	2/5	80%	82%
IGN	6/10	8.1/10	6.8/10	8/10	8.2/10
Next Generation	N/A	N/A	N/A	3/5	N/A
Nintendo Power	3.5/5	3.7/5	N/A	N/A	N/A
Nintendo World Report	N/A	8/10	N/A	N/A	N/A
Official U.S. PlayStation Magazine	N/A	N/A	N/A	3/5	N/A
Official Xbox Magazine (US)	N/A	N/A	N/A	N/A	4.6/10
PC Gamer (US)	N/A	N/A	55%	N/A	N/A

Batman: Vengeance received "mixed or average reviews" across all platforms, according to review aggregator Metacritic. Jeff Lundrigan of NextGen said of the PlayStation 2 version, "While it has a number of things going for it, Batman Vengeance still comes up short in a few key areas."

Jon Thompson of AllGame gave the PlayStation 2 version 3.5 stars out of 5, saying that it was "hampered by its linear nature and lack of mental challenge, but the game is still heads and shoulders above all other Batman titles released in the last few years. Those looking for an entertaining action game as well as those who are huge fans of the Dark Knight will definitely get a kick out of the experience." Later, Chris Holowka gave the GameCube version a similar score of 3.5 stars, saying it was "truly an interactive cartoon, beautifully mimicking the simple, bold animation style that made the animated television series so groundbreaking." Brett Alan Weiss gave the Game Boy Advance version 3 out of 5 stars, saying, "The simplified Metal Gear-type gameplay is marginally appealing and helps tie the package together as an entertaining mixture of well-known play styles with a Batman theme." Computer Games Magazine gave the PC version 2 out of 5 stars, saying, "There's a few clever puzzles scattered throughout the levels; unfortunately, there's also a few incredibly painful flying and driving sequences as well."

Pong Sifu of GamePro said of the PlayStation 2 version, "With some fine tuning, Batman Vengeance could've been legendary. Though many gamers may be put off by the game's shortcomings, Bat-fans looking for a fun-filled romp above the streets of Gotham will be delighted by the film-noir visuals and engaging story line." (Note: GamePro gave the PlayStation 2 version 4/5 for graphics, 5/5 for sound, 2.5/5 for control, and 3.5/5 for fun factor.) The Man in Black said of the Xbox version, "There's much to praise about the effort behind this rough-hewn but imagnative game. If you're a fan, you might tackle this tale of the Dark Knight with a Vengeance." (Note: GamePro gave the Xbox version two 4/5 scores for graphics and sound, and two 3.5/5 scores for control and fun factor.) Michael Lafferty of GameZone gave the Game Boy Advance version 8.4 out of 10, saying, "The graphical elements are very well done, the animation is solid and the various challenges will keep players intrigued." Carlos McElfish gave the Xbox version a score of 7/10, saying, "The gameplay as a whole is lethargic and inaccurate." Lafferty later gave the PC version a similar score of 7/10, calling it "a year-old game newly ported to the PC that plunges players into a world of bad camera angles and overwrought control elements."

The game was nominated for "Outstanding Achievement in Original Musical Composition" at the Academy of Interactive Arts & Sciences' 5th Annual Interactive Achievement Awards, which ultimately went to Tropico. The PlayStation 2 version was also nominated at The Electric Playground's 2001 Blister Awards for "Biggest Disappointment of the Year", but lost to the Xbox version of Shrek.

By the end of 2001, sales of the game had surpassed 540,000 units. Its sales surpassed 670,000 units by the end of March 2002.

== See also ==
- List of video games featuring Batman
- List of video games based on DC Comics
