= Arleen Sorkin =

American actress (1955–2023)

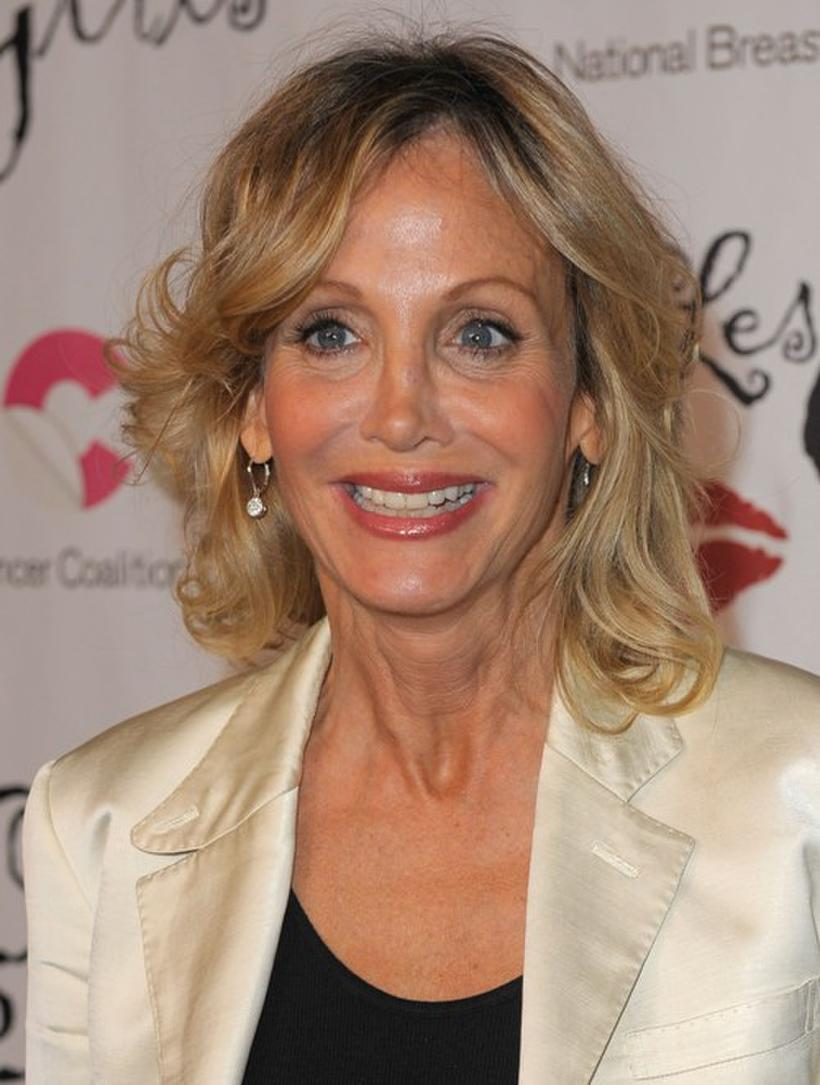
- Sorkin in 2011
- Born: Arleen Frances Sorkin; October 14, 1955; Washington, D.C., U.S.
- Died: August 24, 2023 (aged 67); Los Angeles, California, U.S.
- Occupations: Actress; screenwriter; comedian; presenter
- Years active: 1976–2012
- Spouse: Christopher Lloyd (m. 1995)
- Children: 2
- Relatives: David Lloyd (father-in-law)

Arleen Frances Sorkin (October 14, 1955 – August 24, 2023) was an American actress, screenwriter, television presenter and comedian. Sorkin is known for portraying Calliope Jones on the NBC daytime serial Days of Our Lives and for serving as the inspiration and voice for DC Comics character Harley Quinn, co-created by her friend Paul Dini on Batman: The Animated Series.

== Early life and education ==
Arleen Frances Sorkin was born on October 14, 1955, in Washington, D.C. to Irving and Joyce Sorkin. Her father was a dentist who was a producer on the 2004 film Something the Lord Made. Sorkin had two brothers, Arthur and Robert. Her family is Jewish.

She graduated from Bethesda-Chevy Chase High School in Montgomery County, Maryland and Emerson College in Boston, Massachusetts where she befriended Paul Dini.

== Career ==
Sorkin began her career in cabaret in the late 1970s and early 1980s as a member of the comedy group The High-Heeled Women, alongside Mary Fulham, Tracey Berg, and Cassandra Danz.

One of her more prominent roles was the wacky but lovable Calliope Jones, as seen on the soap opera Days of Our Lives. She played this part from 1984 to 1990 and made return visits in 1992 and 2001. She reprised her role on the soap for the fourth time on February 24, 2006. She returned to Days for a limited run beginning on May 5, 2010.

From 1987 to 1989, Sorkin played Geneva, a sexy maid to yuppie couple Richard and Linda Phillips, on the Fox dramedy series Duet. She would reprise this role on one episode of Open House, the sequel series to Duet.

She was the original female co-host on America's Funniest People in 1990. In 1992, Sorkin was dismissed from America's Funniest People by producer Vin Di Bona. In response, Sorkin filed a lawsuit against Di Bona, claiming she was dismissed from the show due to her race, after ABC Chairman Dan Burke had suggested to Di Bona that Sorkin be replaced by an African-American or a person of another ethnic minority. Sorkin sought $450,000 for lost earnings, and an additional unspecified amount for harm to her professional reputation and emotional injury. She additionally claimed that after she denounced the move as being racially motivated, Di Bona changed plans and hired new cohost Tawny Kitaen, who was also white.

Sorkin's writing included for the Tiny Toon Adventures 1990–1992 television series, and co-writer of the story and screenplay of the 1997 Jennifer Aniston film, Picture Perfect.

Alongside providing the voice, the character of Harley Quinn was based on her, after Paul Dini (her friend since college), saw her play a jester from a dream sequence in Days of Our Lives. Dini then patterned Harley Quinn on Sorkin, incorporating aspects such as her mannerisms and "very snappy, wisecracking, bubbly blonde" personality. In recording Harley Quinn's voice, Sorkin spoke in her normal Brooklyn accent while putting in a "little Yiddish sound", since Dini made the character Jewish, another aspect of the character borrowed from Sorkin. Harley Quinn made her first appearance in the Batman: The Animated Series episode "Joker's Favor" originally intended to appear in a single episode, but reaction to the character and Sorkin's voice performance was positive, so Quinn was written into the show regularly, and appeared in further DC Animated Universe series, including The New Batman Adventures, Static Shock, Justice League, Gotham Girls, and the animated film Batman Beyond: Return of the Joker. Her last performances as Harley Quinn were the video games Batman: Arkham Asylum (2009) and DC Universe Online (2011). The character was also written into the DC mainstream universe comics themselves, beginning with the one-shot Batman: Harley Quinn #1 in 1999.

For the series Frasier (1993–2004), produced by her husband Christopher Lloyd, Sorkin would perform as a caller to Frasier Crane's radio show; the lines would later be dubbed over by a celebrity caller.

== Personal life ==
Sorkin married television writer-producer Christopher Lloyd in 1995, with whom she had two sons, Eli and Owen.

== Death ==
Sorkin died in Los Angeles on August 24, 2023, at the age of 67, of complications from pneumonia and multiple sclerosis. The Season 4 finale of the Harley Quinn TV series, "Killer's Block", was dedicated to Sorkin. A dedication plaque to her and castmate Kevin Conroy were featured as easter egg in the 2024 video game, Suicide Squad: Kill the Justice League.

== Filmography ==
=== Film ===
Year	Title	Role	Notes
1983	Trading Places	Woman at Party	Uncredited
1985	From Here to Maternity	Judy	Television film
1986	Odd Jobs	Diner Waitress	
1987	Paul Reiser Out on a Whim		
1991	Oscar	Vendetti's Manicurist	
1991	Ted & Venus	Marcia	
1991	I Don't Buy Kisses Anymore	Monica	
1993	Perry Mason: The Case of the Killer Kiss	Peg Ferman	Television film
1993	Batman: Mask of the Phantasm	Ms. Bambi (voice)	Uncredited
1994	It's Pat	Herself	
2000	Batman Beyond: Return of the Joker	Harley Quinn / Harleen Quinzel (voice)	Direct-to-video
2004	Comic Book: The Movie	Ms. Q (Studio Secretary)	Direct-to-video

=== Television ===
Year	Title	Role	Notes
1984–1990, 1992, 2006, 2010	Days of Our Lives	Calliope Jones	427 episodes
1986–1989	The New Hollywood Squares	Panelist	
1987	The New Mike Hammer	Traci Baskin	Episode: "The Last Laugh"
1987–1989	Duet	Geneva	50 episodes
1989	Open House	Geneva	Episode: "Parade of Homes"
1989	Family Feud	Herself	
1990	Dream On	Donna di Angelo	Episode: "Angst for the Memories"
1990	Room for Romance		Episode: "Fool's Good"
1990–1992	America's Funniest People	Co-host	49 episodes
1991	Taz-Mania	Veronica (voice)	Episode: "Bewitched Bob"
1992–1994	Batman: The Animated Series	Harley Quinn / Harleen Quinzel (voice)	9 episodes
1997–1999	The New Batman Adventures	Harley Quinn / Harleen Quinzel (voice)	6 episodes
1997	Superman: The Animated Series	Harley Quinn / Harleen Quinzel (voice)	Episode: "World's Finest" (Three-Parter)
2000–2002	Gotham Girls	Harley Quinn / Harleen Quinzel (voice)	25 episodes
2003	Static Shock	Harley Quinn / Harleen Quinzel (voice)	Episode: "Hard as Nails"
2003	Justice League	Harley Quinn / Harleen Quinzel (voice)	Episode: "Wild Cards" (Two-Parter)
2004	Frasier	Rachel	Episode: "Goodnight, Seattle: Part 2"

=== Video games ===
Year	Title	Voice role	Notes
1994	The Adventures of Batman & Robin	Harley Quinn / Harleen Quinzel	Sega CD version
2001	Batman: Vengeance	Harley Quinn / Harleen Quinzel	
2001	Batman: Gotham City Racer	Harley Quinn / Harleen Quinzel	Archive footage
2009	Batman: Arkham Asylum	Harley Quinn / Harleen Quinzel	
2011–2012	DC Universe Online	Harley Quinn / Harleen Quinzel	Final role
2016	Batman: Return to Arkham	Harley Quinn / Harleen Quinzel	Archive sound

=== Writer ===
Year	Title	Notes
1997	Picture Perfect	Screenplay, story

== Awards and nominations ==
Year	Association	Category	Nominated work	Result
2009	Spike Video Game Awards	Best Voice	Batman: Arkham Asylum (as "Harley Quinn")	Nominated
1988	Daytime Emmy Awards	Outstanding Supporting Actress in a Drama Series	Days of Our Lives	Nominated
1989	Daytime Emmy Awards	Outstanding Supporting Actress in a Drama Series	Days of Our Lives	Nominated
1985	Soap Opera Digest Awards	Outstanding Actress in a Supporting Role in a Daytime Serial	Days of Our Lives	Won
1985	Soap Opera Digest Awards	Outstanding New Actress in a Daytime Serial	Days of Our Lives	Won
1986	Soap Opera Digest Awards	Outstanding Comic Relief Role on a Daytime Serial	Days of Our Lives	Won
1988	Soap Opera Digest Awards	Outstanding Comic Performance by an Actress: Daytime	Days of Our Lives	Won
2011	Peabody Awards	Shared with Jessica Hernández (editor)	Bhutto	Won
2011	International Documentary Association	Video Source Award; Shared with Duane Baughman (director/producer); Johnny O'Hara (director/writer); Mark Siegel (producer); Glenn Aveni (executive producer)	Bhutto	Won
