= Aubrey and Gus =

Canadian children's television series

- Genre: Children's television series
- Written by: Dick Thomas
- Starring: Lloyd Jones
- Voices of: Norma MacMillan; Garry Lay
- Narrated by: Dick Thomas
- Country of origin: Canada
- Original language: English
- No. of seasons: 1

Production
- Producer: Don Wilson
- Running time: 15 minutes

Original release
- Network: CBC Television
- Release: September 26, 1955 – June 18, 1956

Aubrey and Gus is a Canadian children's television series that aired on CBC Television between September 26, 1955, and June 18, 1956.

Aubrey is a puppet raccoon who speaks with boy's voice, which prevents his family from understanding him. He befriends a boy named Gus, and together they search for Aubrey's raccoon voice.
