= Kom Toch Eens Kijken =

Flemish children's television series

- 1960 TV screenshot met nonkel Bob en tante Ria.
- Created by: Rik Van Den Abbeele
- Presented by: Bob Davidse; Terry Van Ginderen
- Country of origin: Belgium
- No. of seasons: 5

Production
- Running time: 1 hour

Original release
- Network: NIR 1 (nowadays Eén)
- Release: 12 March 1955 – 1960

Kom Toch Eens Kijken (Come And See) was a Flemish children's TV series, broadcast between 1955 and 1960 on the Flemish public TV channel NIR 1 (nowadays Eén). It was hosted by Bob Davidse and Terry Van Ginderen, who both presented themselves to their young viewers as Nonkel Bob (Uncle Bob) and Tante Terry (Aunt Terry).

It was the first Flemish children's TV show. Since there was only one Flemish TV channel at the time virtually all families with a TV set watched it. It was also the show which launched the careers of Bob Davidse and Terry Van Ginderen.

== History ==
TV maker Rik Van den Abbeele had contacted Bob Davidse, who was already well known in Flanders as a singer and puppeteer. The first episode was broadcast on 12 March 1955. Bob Davidse, nicknamed Nonkel Bob, was first co-hosted by Tante Paula (Aunt Paula, played by TV presenter Paula Sémer. She was later succeeded by Tante Lieve (Lieve Simoens), Tante Rita, Tante Berta and Tante Ria (Mimi Peetermans). Eventually Terry van Ginderen became his permanent co-host as Tante Terry.

== Concept ==
Every episode started out with a song sung by Nonkel Bob, Tante Terry and all children in the studio, while Davidse played his guitar. The melody was based on the Sinterklaas song Oh kom eens kijken wat er in mijn schoentje ligt (Oh, come and look what's in my shoe), but had different lyrics, related to the show: Oh, kom eens kijken / ons uurtje zet nu in/ zo dadelijk zal blijken / iedereen krijgt hier zijn zin (Oh, come and see / our hour will start now / soon it will be proven / that everyone gets his wish). After the song everyone greeted the viewer with the TV Ohee-salute. By using two index fingers they created the letter t and afterwards the letter v with the aid of the index and middle finger (comparable to the V sign) and shouted: Ohee!. Nonkel Bob and Tante Terry then greeted the children in the studio and at home, whereupon everyone shouted Dag Nonkel Bob, Dag Tante Terry (Hi, Nonkel Bob, Hi Tante Terry!).

During the broadcast hour Davidse had the children engage in handicraft or taught them a song on his guitar. The best known songs which debuted in this TV series were Vrolijke Vrienden (Happy Friends, 1958) and Annemarie (1968). Every week the show had an honorary guest, which was usually a child who was allowed to take part in the life of the adults, for instance the fire brigade. The hosts first interviewed him or her and then showed how the child's day was through an earlier recorded report at location.

After debuting in 1961, Tante Terry had a segment where she interreacted with a stuffed squirrel named Kraakje.

== Fanclub ==
Davidse also had a fanclub, the TV-Oheeclub, which was established since every episode had a viewers' contest. Children who answered correctly received an award and after ten good answers they received a special sign, which made them part of the club. Through enthusiastic reactions and easy subscriptions (children just had to send a letter) the club soon had over 55.000 members.

== The Rolling Stones ==
In 1964 Davidse and Van Ginderen interviewed The Rolling Stones in their show.

== Later retitling ==
In 1960 the show was retitled Tip-Top. It ran under that name until 1961. Afterwards it became Televisum, Jevanjong and eventually Kijkuit. Davidse was assisted by Zaki, Kris Smet and Nadine De Sloovere. In 1965 the program made a lot of promotion to drink milk, as part of the Melkbrigade. Even after the show was cancelled, Davidse remained the most prominent children's TV host on Flemish television until 1985.
