= Bim Bam Boom =

Canadian children's television series

- Genre: Children's television series
- Starring: John Allen
- Voices of: Rosemary Malkin; Sam Payne
- Country of origin: Canada
- Original language: English

Production
- Production locations: Vancouver, British Columbia, Canada
- Running time: 15 minutes

Original release
- Network: CBC Television
- Release: November 18, 1955 – January 13, 1956

Bim Bam Boom is a Canadian children's television series that aired on CBC Television between November 18, 1955 and January 13, 1956. The show featured three clowns, named Bim, Bam and Boom, who told fairy tales and performed. The clown Boom was a human actor played by John Allen. Bim and Bam were puppets controlled by Kitty Dutcher and voiced by Rosemary Malkin and Sam Payne.
