= Terry Van Ginderen =

Flemish television presenter and businesswoman (1931–2018)

Esther Van Ginderen-Verbeeck
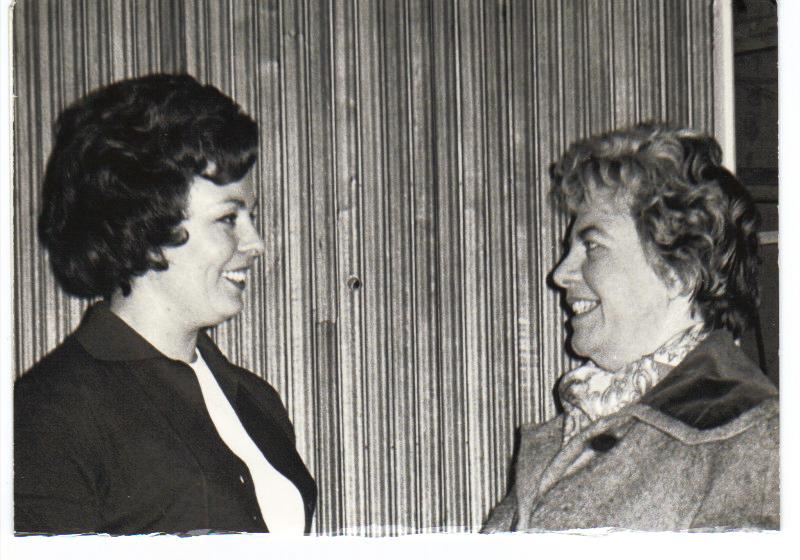
- Terry Van Ginderen and Ke Riema in the sixties
- Born: 8 September 1931; Hoboken, Antwerp, Belgium
- Died: 30 January 2018 (aged 86); Bonheiden, Belgium
- Other name: Tante Terry
- Occupations: Television presenter, businesswoman
- Years active: 1954–2018
- Known for: Kom Toch Eens Kijken, Klein Klein Kleutertje

Esther Van Ginderen-Verbeeck (8 September 1931, Antwerp, Belgium – 30 January 2018, Bonheiden, Belgium), also known as Tante Terry (Aunt Terry), was a Belgian Flemish-speaking television presenter and businesswoman. She was best-known as a host of children's TV shows, often alongside Bob Davidse, better known as Nonkel Bob (Uncle Bob). Their best known show was Kom Toch Eens Kijken.

== Life and career ==
She was born in Hoboken, Antwerp, Belgium. In 1954, she worked for the first Flemish TV channel NIR. As "Aunt Terry", she presented, together with Bob Davidse ("Nonkel Bob"), the children's program Kom Toch Eens Kijken (Come Take a Look), and, from 1961 for eighteen years, Klein Klein Kleutertje (Little Little Toddler). After her resignation in 1979, she became a businesswoman.

From 1989, when the first Flemish commercial TV channel VTM hosted children's programs for them, but also as a jury member in game shows. In 1992, she became manager of Silvy Melody.

== Last years and death ==
On the occasion of her 75th birthday in 2006, Van Ginderen was received at the Antwerp City Hall. She was active as a presenter of fashion shows and active with performances for the elderly, until her death from pneumonia at age 86 in Bonheiden.

== Discography ==
At record company Arcade Records:

- 3 Hansel and Gretel
- 4 The Wolf and the Seven Kids
- 5 Small Thumb
- 6 Rumpelstiltskin
- 7 Snow White (1968)
- 8 The Booted Cat (1968)
- 9 Red Riding Hood (1968)
- 10 Cinderella (1968)
- 13 The Little Boy of Krentekoek
- 14 The Forget-Me-Not (1969))
- 15 The Three Little Piglets (1969)
- 16 Sleeping Beauty (1969)
- 18 The Pied Piper of Hamelin (1971)
- 19 The Emperor's New Clothes (1971)
- 20 Female Hollow (1971)
- 21 The Abduction of Marinel (1971)
- 25 The Smart Pig
- 26 The Steadfast Tin Soldier
- 27 The Bremen Town Musicians

=== International Bestseller Company ===
- Rag Bean 97604
- The ugly duckling 605
- The Bremen Street Musicians 606
- Alladin and the Wonderlamp 607
- The Tin Soldier 608
- The Smart Pig 609
- Table-cover-610
- Sleeping Beauty 611
- Snow White 612

=== The Pili's ===
- The Pili's 1: The snowman - The old postman
- The Pili's 2: Merlin's birthday - The weatherhouse
- The Pili's 3: The rose elephant - The swimming pool

=== Series "Sing and Dance with Aunt Terry" ===
- 1 Hula Thumb - Two Hands - Come a little closer - 1 2 3 4 5 6 7
- 2 Ikkeltje Kramikkeltje - The A-B-C - Come out - De Klepperman
- 11 Little Small Toddler - I saw two bears - Impulse - The Cow - Note here, note there

=== Musti ===
- Musti 1 (1971) (Musti home, Musti on the street)
- Musti 2 (1971) (Musti in the attic, Musti station master)
- Musti 3 (1973) (Musti and the circus, Musti in the rain)

=== LPs ===
- Aunt Terry tells, volume 1
- Aunt Terry tells, volume 2
- Aunt Terry tells, volume 3
- Aunt Terry tells, volume 4
- Aunt Terry tells, volume 5: The smart little pig - The Tin Soldier - Aladdin and the Wonderlamp
- Aunt Terry sings for all good children (songs for Sinterklaas and Christmas
- Musti by Aunt Terry volume 2 (Station master - Home - On the street - In the attic - In the rain - The circus) (1974)
- Sing and dance with Aunt Terry, Louis Neefs & de Biekens (1974?)
- Sing and dance with Aunt Terry 1, with De Karekieten from Dilsen (1975)
- Sing and dance with Aunt Terry 2, with De Meiklokjes (1975)
- Sing and dance with Aunt Terry, with De Karekieten from Dilsen (1975)
- Aunt Terry tells the Pili's (The Snowman - The Birthday of Merlin - The Pink Elephant - The Old Mailman - The Weatherhouse - The Pool)
- Aunt Terry tells (Snow White - The Forget-me-not - Little Red Riding Hood - The Pied Piper of Hamelin) (1975)
- Aunt Terry tells (Cinderella - Sleeping Beauty - The three little piggies - Vrouw Holle) (1975)
- Aunt Terry tells (Hansel and Gretel - De Gelaarsde Kat - The wolf and the seven goats - The little boy and the currant cake) (1975)
- Aunt Terry tells (The ugly duckling De Bremer street musicians - Lappenbontje) (1976)
- Aunt Terry tells (Alladin and the wonder lamp - The smart little pig - The tin soldier)
- Tante Terry tells (Snow White - Tafeltje-dek-je - Doornroosje)
- Aunt Terry sings Sinterklaas songs: the 22 most beautiful Sinterklaas songs!
- Children's songs by Aunt Terry
- Our most beautiful fairy tales (double-lp)
- The color tubes: children's musical (with children's choir Carmina from Ekeren) (1979)
