= 1956 in American television =

This is a list of American television-related events in 1956.

== Events ==
Date	Event	Ref.
January 28	Elvis Presley makes his national television debut on the CBS program, Stage Show, the first of six appearances on the series.	
January 30	NBC swaps its Cleveland radio and TV stations to Westinghouse Broadcasting in exchange for Westinghouse's own Philadelphia radio and TV stations. The trade was eventually reversed in 1965.	
February	U.M. & M. TV Corporation acquires the pre-October 1950 releases of Paramount Pictures cartoons and theatrical shorts, excluding the Popeye the Sailor cartoons (which were sold to Associated Artists Productions in June) and the Superman cartoons. This includes most Fleischer/Famous Studios-produced cartoons. Those assets would eventually be purchased by National Telefilm Associates about fourteen months later.	
April	U.S. Senator Estes Kefauver holds congressional hearings on the rising rates of juvenile crime and publishes an article in Reader's Digest named "Let's Get Rid of Tele-Violence."	
April	NBC owned-and-operated station WNBQ-TV (now WMAQ-TV) in Chicago, Illinois becomes the first television station to locally broadcast in color.	
April 14	The Ampex company demonstrates a videotape recorder at the 1956 NARTB (now National Association of Broadcasters) convention in Chicago. It was the demonstration of the first practical and commercially successful videotape format known as 2" Quadruplex. ABC, NBC, and CBS place orders for the recorders.	
August 6	The DuMont Television Network ends network operations, with a live broadcast of a boxing match being the network's final broadcast.	
May 22	NBC introduces a brightly-hued peacock logo to denote the network's first color broadcasts. An animated version of the peacock would air the following year.	
October	National Telefilm Associates launches the ad-hoc NTA Film Network in the latest attempt to create a fourth television network two months after the demise of the DuMont network.	
October 29	CBS uses its Ampex VTR to record the evening news, anchored by Douglas Edwards, which was then fed to the West Coast stations three hours later. This event marks the first use of videotape in network television programming.	
October 29	Chet Huntley and David Brinkley take over anchor duties of NBC's evening newscast, which is renamed The Huntley-Brinkley Report.	
November 3	CBS televises the first-ever broadcast of the 1939 Metro-Goldwyn-Mayer release The Wizard of Oz. An estimated 45 million people viewed the broadcast.	
November	Jonathan Winters uses videotape and superimposing techniques to be able to play two characters in the same skit for his NBC television show. This occasion marks the first use of videotape for a network television entertainment program.	
December 31	Bob Barker makes his national television debut on the game show Truth or Consequences.	
December 31	Guy Lombardo hosts his first televised New Year's Eve celebration on CBS.	
Unknown date	Portable black-and-white television sets were marketed for the first time.	

=== Other notable events ===
- The Paramount Television Network ends network operations after about eight years.

== Television programs ==
=== Debuts ===
Date	Debut	Network
January 3	Queen for a Day	NBC
January 3	Do You Trust Your Wife?	CBS
February 10	My Friend Flicka	CBS
April 2	As the World Turns	CBS
April 2	The Edge of Night	CBS
April 8	Telephone Time	CBS
May	The Open Mind	NET
May 12	The Gabby Hayes Show	ABC
June 24	The Steve Allen Show	NBC
July 3	G.E. Summer Originals	ABC
July 3	The Kaiser Aluminum Hour	NBC
July 3	Sneak Preview	NBC
August 7	The Golden Touch of Frankie Carle	NBC
September 3	The Adventures of Dr. Fu Manchu	Broadcast syndication
September 18	Conflict	ABC
September 7	The Adventures of Jim Bowie	ABC
September 7	Treasure Hunt	ABC
September 8	Hey, Jeannie!	CBS
September 12	Twenty-One	NBC
September 18	Conflict	ABC
September 21	The Sheriff of Cochise	Broadcast syndication
September 21	Ethel Barrymore Theatre	Dumont
September 23	Circus Boy	NBC
September 24	Stanley	NBC
September 25	Broken Arrow	ABC
September 25	State Trooper	Broadcast syndication
September 29	The Gale Storm Show	CBS
October 1	Dr. Christian	Broadcast syndication
October 3	The Adventures of Hiram Holliday	NBC
October 4	The Ford Show	NBC
October 4	Playhouse 90	CBS
October 4	Wire Service	ABC
October 5	Dick Powell's Zane Grey Theatre	CBS
October 5	The Dinah Shore Chevy Show	NBC
October 5	The West Point Story	CBS
October 14	The Heckle and Jeckle Cartoon Show	CBS
October 21	Tales of the 77th Bengal Lancers	NBC
October 29	The Huntley–Brinkley Report	NBC
November 11	Air Power	CBS
November 26	The Price Is Right	NBC
December 18	To Tell the Truth	CBS
December 22	You're on Your Own	CBS
Unknown	Bingo at Home	DuMont

=== Ending this year ===
Date	Program	Network	First aired	Status	Notes/References
January 12	Wanted	CBS	October 20, 1955	Ended	
January 21	Captain Midnight	CBS	September 9, 1954	Ended	
February 25	Life Begins at Eighty	ABC	January 13, 1950 (on NBC)	Ended	
March 5	Medical Horizons	ABC	September 12, 1955	Canceled	
March 14	Brave Eagle	CBS	September 28, 1955	Ended	
March 19	Jungle Jim	Syndication	September 26, 1955	Canceled	
March 22	The Cisco Kid	Syndication	September 5, 1950	Ended	
March 25	Justice	NBC	April 8, 1954	Ended	
April 24	Casablanca	ABC	September 27, 1955	Ended	
April 28	It's Always Jan	CBS	September 10, 1955	Canceled	
May 2	MGM Parade	ABC	September 14, 1955	Ended	
May 11	Our Miss Brooks	CBS	October 3, 1952	Ended	
May 22	Warner Bros. Presents	ABC	September 20, 1955	Ended	
June 1	Hollywood Preview	DuMont	September 14, 1955	Ended	
June 3	It's a Great Life	NBC	September 7, 1954	Ended	
June 14	Stop the Music	ABC	May 5, 1949	Ended	
June 23	Chance of a Lifetime	Unknown	1952	Ended	
June 23	The Jimmy Durante Show	Unknown	1954	Ended	
July 9	TV Reader's Digest	ABC	January 17, 1955	Ended	
August 7	The Gene Autry Show	CBS	July 23, 1950	Ended	
August 9	Star Tonight	ABC	February 3, 1955	Ended	
August 14	Sneak Preview	NBC	July 3, 1956	Ended	
August 27	Medic	NBC	September 13, 1954	Ended	
August 31	The Best in Mystery	NBC	1954	Ended	
September 3	The Dotty Mack Show	ABC	February 16, 1953 (on DuMont)	Canceled	
September 8	Down You Go	NBC	May 30, 1951	Ended	
September 11	This Is Show Business	NBC	July 15, 1949	Ended	
September 18	Stage Show	ABC	July 3, 1954	Ended	
September 18	G.E. Summer Originals	ABC	July 3, 1956	Ended	
September 22	The Honeymooners	CBS	October 1, 1955	Canceled	
September 25	Joe and Mabel	CBS	September 20, 1955	Ended	
September 27	Combat Sergeant	Syndication	June 29, 1956	Ended	
September 27	Four Star Playhouse	CBS	September 25, 1952	Ended	
October 20	The Golden Touch of Frankie Carle	NBC	August 7, 1956	Ended	
October 26	Camel News Caravan	NBC	February 16, 1949	Ended	
November 2	My Friend Flicka	CBS	February 10, 1956	Ended	
November 26	The Adventures of Dr. Fu Manchu	Syndication	September 3, 1956	Ended	
December 21	Ethel Barrymore Theatre	DuMont	September 21, 1956	Ended	
December 28	Ding Dong School	NBC	November 24, 1952	Ended	
Unknown date	Super Circus	ABC	1949	Ended	

== Networks and services ==
=== Network launches ===
Network	Type	Launch date	Notes
NTA Film Network	Broadcast	October	
Sports Network Incorporated	Cable television	Unknown	

=== Network closures ===
Network	Type	End date	Notes
DuMont Television Network	Broadcast	August	
Paramount Television Network	Broadcast	Unknown date	

== Television stations ==
=== Station launches ===
Date	Market	Station	Channel	Affiliation	Notes/References
January 1	Hastings, Nebraska	KHAS-TV	5	NBC	
January 1	Memphis, Tennessee	WREC-TV	3	CBS	
January 1	Odessa, Texas	KOSA-TV	7	CBS	
January 7	Laredo, Texas	KHAD-TV	8	NBC (primary); ABC/CBS (secondary)	
January 15	Big Spring, Texas (Odessa/Midland, Texas)	KBST-TV	4	ABC	
January 30	Abilene, Texas	KPAR-TV	12	CBS	
January 30	Denver, Colorado	KRMA-TV	6	NET	
February 1	Savannah, Georgia	WSAV-TV	3	NBC (primary); ABC (secondary)	
February 9	Hayes Center, Nebraska	KHPL-TV		CBS	Satellite of KHOL-TV (now KHGI-TV) in Kearney
February 19	Juneau, Alaska	KINY-TV	8	ABC	
February 20	Columbus, Ohio	WOSU-TV	34	NET	
April 1	Roseburg, Oregon	KPIC	19	NBC (primary); ABC/CBS (secondary)	
April 13	Oklahoma City, Oklahoma	KETA-TV	13	NET	Flagship of the Oklahoma Educational Television Authority
April 26	Marquette, Michigan	WLUC-TV	6	CBS (primary); ABC/NBC (secondary)	
April 29	Richmond, Virginia	WRVA-TV	12	CBS	
April 29	Spartanburg, South Carolina	WSPA-TV	7	CBS	
May 4	Las Vegas, Nevada	KSHO-TV	13	ABC	
May 6	Chattanooga, Tennessee	WRGP-TV	3	NBC	
May 10	Fresno, California	KFRE-TV	12	CBS	
May 21	Milwaukee, Wisconsin	WITI-TV	6	Independent	
May 22	Corpus Christi, Texas	KRIS-TV	6	NBC (primary); ABC (secondary)	
June 3	Tucson, Arizona	KDWI-TV	9	ABC	
June 11	Daytona Beach/Orlando, Florida	WESH-TV	2	Independent	
June 24	Madison, Wisconsin	WISC-TV	3	CBS	
June 25	Memphis, Tennessee	WKNO	10	NET	
July 13	Columbus, Mississippi	WCBI-TV	4	CBS (primary); ABC/NBC (secondary)	
July 29	Miami, Florida	WCKT	7	NBC (primary); ABC (secondary)	
August 1	Chico/Redding, California	KVIP-TV	7	NBC	
August 5	Hagåtña, Guam	KUAM-TV	8	NBC (primary); CBS/ABC (secondary)	
August 8	Andalusia, Alabama	WAIQ	2	NET	Part of the Alabama Educational Television network; now Dozier, Alabama-licensed WDIQ
August 12	Knoxville, Tennessee	WBIR-TV	10	NBC (primary); CBS (secondary)	
August 12	Sherman, Texas (Ada, Oklahoma)	KVSO-TV	12	NBC	
August 13	Bristol, Virginia (Bristol/Johnson City/Kingsport, Tennessee)	WCYB-TV	5	NBC (primary); ABC (Secondary)	
August 13	Klamath Falls, Oregon	KOTI	2	NBC (primary); ABC (secondary)	
August 21	Evansville, Indiana	WTVW	7	ABC	
August 24	Carlsbad, New Mexico	KOCT	6	ABC	
September 1	El Paso, Texas	KILT	13	ABC	
September 15	Elmira, New York	WSYE-TV	18	NBC	
September 18	Montrose, Colorado	KFXJ-TV	10	CBS (primary); ABC/NBC/NTA Film Network (secondary)	Now KREY-TV; calls previously used on a station in Grand Junction, Colorado
September 30	Corpus Christi, Texas	KSIX-TV	10	CBS (primary); ABC (secondary)	
October 13	Presque Isle, Maine	WAGM-TV	8	CBS	
October 15	Dickenson, North Dakota	KDIX-TV	2	CBS (primary); ABC/NBC (secondary)	
December 15	Portland, Oregon	KGW	8	ABC	
December 15	Raleigh, North Carolina	WRAL-TV	5	NBC	

=== Network affiliation changes ===
Date	Market	Station	Channel	Old affiliation	New affiliation	References
January 1	Waco, Texas	KWTX-TV	10	ABC	CBS	
March 1	West Palm Beach, Florida	WIRK-TV	21	Independent	August 31, 1953	
Unknown	Denver, Colorado	KBTV	9	DuMont (primary); ABC (secondary)	ABC (secondary)	
Unknown	Windsor, Ontario, Canada; Detroit, Michigan, United States	CKLW-TV	9	CBC Television (primary); DuMont (secondary)	CBC Television (exclusive)	Would become a CBC owned-and-operated station in 1975.

=== Station closures ===
Date	City of license/Market	Station	Channel	Affiliation	First air date	Notes/Ref.
January 21	Columbia, South Carolina	WCOS-TV	25		April 25, 1953	
April 29	Greenville, South Carolina	WGVL	23		July 15, 1953	
April 30	Wichita, Kansas	KEDD-TV	16	Independent	August 15, 1953	
June 16	Ashtabula, Ohio	WICA-TV	15	Independent	August 25, 1953	
September 4	Reading, Pennsylvania	WHUM-TV	61	CBS	February 22, 1953	
Unknown date	Des Moines, Iowa	KGTV	17		1953	
