= 1955–56 United States network television schedule =

The 1955–56 network television schedule for the four major English language commercial broadcast networks in the United States. The schedule covers primetime hours from September 1955 through March 1956. The schedule is followed by a list per network of returning series, new series, and series cancelled after the 1954–55 season.

The $64,000 Question had debuted on CBS during summer 1955 and became the #1 program on U.S. television. The three networks "rushed to copy this latest hit format, quickly filling prime time with similar contests". (It would not be until fall 1958 that it would be confirmed that several of these new quiz shows were rigged.)

For years, ABC had "struggled to cobble together a TV schedule", but following the network's major success with Disney-produced series Disneyland in 1954, other Hollywood film companies began embracing television. MGM assembled clips for MGM Parade on ABC; ABC also hired Warner Bros. for a Tuesday night program called Warner Brothers Presents. The hour-long umbrella series featured TV adaptations of three Warner Brothers movies: Cheyenne, Casablanca, and Kings Row. Of the three new series, only Cheyenne was a hit with viewers, and ABC began contracting with other Hollywood studios for Westerns. Immediately following Warner Brothers Presents, ABC scheduled The Life and Legend of Wyatt Earp. This Western was also produced in conjunction with a Hollywood studio: Desilu Productions.

CBS had its own Western hit with Gunsmoke, which also debuted in fall 1955. Over the next few years, "the rush to Westerns had become a virtual stampede so that, by the fall of 1959, viewers had their choice from a staggering twenty-eight different Western-based prime time series." Around 1955, live drama anthologies, the staple of early television programming, were being phased out by the networks in favor of filmed fare: Westerns, police dramas, quiz shows, and adventure series.

By the mid-1950s, the practice of television executives of ordering dozens of pilots for proposed television series each year — far more than their networks could possibly broadcast as series — had created a sizable body of unsold pilots that had never aired. By 1954, the American television industry had begun to consider the idea of packaging these unsold pilots in anthology series and airing them during the summer, providing television networks with a way of both providing fresh programming during the summer rerun season and recouping at least some of the expense of producing them. During the summer of 1956, ABC and NBC acted on this idea, airing the first series — G.E. Summer Originals on ABC and Sneak Preview on NBC — composed entirely of unsold pilots. On June 8, 1956, when it reported ABC's decision to broadcast G.E. Summer Originals, the New York Times wrote that "the problem of what to do with ‘pilot’ or sample films of projected television series that previously have failed to sell has been solved." Both series premiered on July 3, 1956, at 9:00 p.m. In the following decades, ABC, NBC, and later CBS would air a number of anthology series consisting in whole or in part of unsold pilots.

The struggling DuMont Television Network offered little during the 1955–56 television season. DuMont's final program line-up consisted of What's the Story on Wednesday nights at 9:30 and Boxing From St. Nicholas Arena on Monday nights at 9:00. By September 23, What's the Story was off the air. DuMont honored its few remaining network commitments until August 6, 1956, when it ceased operations as a major television network. DuMont hoped to go into independent television production; the company's studio facilities and Electronicam system were used to produce CBS's The Honeymooners during the 1955–56 season. DuMont's loss was ABC's gain, as some of DuMont's most popular programs, including Life Is Worth Living, Chance of a Lifetime, Life Begins at Eighty, and Down You Go, found their way onto ABC's 1955–56 prime time schedule.

The crumbling and eventual death of the old DuMont Network meant the 1955–56 television season would be the first year in which the three major remaining U.S. television networks would be the only full-time commercial participants in prime time, a situation that was to remain for the next 31 years, until Fox entered prime time on Sunday, April 5, 1987.

This was the first season that CBS and NBC aired some of their prime-time programs in color.

New series are highlighted in bold.

All times are U.S. Eastern and Pacific time (except for some live sports or events). Subtract one hour for Central and Mountain times.

Each of the 30 highest-rated shows is listed with its rank and rating as determined by Nielsen Media Research.

== Legend ==
- Light blue indicates local programming
- Light green indicates sporting events.
- Light purple indicates movies.
- Red indicates series being burned off and other irregularly scheduled programs, including specials.
- Yellow indicates the programs in the top 10 for the season.
- Cyan indicates the programs in the top 20 for the season.
- Magenta indicates the programs in the top 30 for the season.

== Sunday ==
Network	7:00 PM	7:30 PM	8:00 PM	8:30 PM	9:00 PM	9:30 PM	10:00 PM	10:30 PM
ABC	You Asked For It	**Famous Film Festival**			Chance of a Lifetime	The Original Amateur Hour	Life Begins at Eighty	Local Programming
CBS	Lassie	The Jack Benny Show (5/37.2) / Private Secretary (12/32.4) (Tied with Ford Theatre)	The Ed Sullivan Show* (3/39.5)		General Electric Theater (11/32.9)	**Alfred Hitchcock Presents**	Appointment with Adventure	What's My Line?
NBC	It's a Great Life	**Frontier**	Colgate Variety Hour**		Goodyear Television Playhouse / **The Alcoa Hour**		The Loretta Young Show	Justice

* The Ed Sullivan Show was formerly Toast of the Town.
** formerly The Colgate Comedy Hour.

- On NBC, Color Spread (COLOR) aired as a monthly series, 7:30–9 p.m.
- Appointment with Adventure premiered on CBS on April 3, 1955, and ran through September 1955, before starting its regular second season in the same time slot on October 2, 1955. The anthology series had no host.

== Monday ==
Network		7:00 PM	7:30 PM	8:00 PM	8:30 PM	9:00 PM	9:30 PM	10:00 PM	10:30 PM
ABC		Kukla, Fran and Ollie (7:00) / John Daly and the News (7:15)	Topper (repeats)	TV Reader's Digest	The Voice of Firestone	The Dotty Mack Show	**Medical Horizons**	The Big Picture	Local Programming
CBS	Fall	Local (7:00) / Douglas Edwards with the News (7:15)	**The Adventures of Robin Hood** (20/30.1)	The George Burns and Gracie Allen Show (27/28.4) (Tied with People Are Funny)	Arthur Godfrey's Talent Scouts (16/31.1)	I Love Lucy (2/46.1)	December Bride (6/37.0)	Studio One	
CBS	Summer	Local (7:00) / Douglas Edwards with the News (7:15)	**The Adventures of Robin Hood** (20/30.1)	The George Burns and Gracie Allen Show (27/28.4) (Tied with People Are Funny)	Arthur Godfrey's Talent Scouts (16/31.1)	I Love Lucy (2/46.1)	**The Vic Damone Show**	Studio One	
DMN		Local				Boxing From St. Nicholas Arena (9:00) / At Ringside (10:45)			
NBC		Local	The Tony Martin Show (7:30) / Camel News Caravan (7:45)	Caesar's Hour		Medic	Robert Montgomery Presents		Local Programming

Note: On NBC, Producers' Showcase aired as a monthly series 8–9:30 p.m. No longer a network operation, DuMont continued airing its Boxing From St. Nicholas Arena on an occasional basis over individual stations until August 6, 1956. On CBS, in most areas, Douglas Edwards With the News aired at 6:45 p.m., while some cities (including New York) aired the 7:15 p.m. edition.

== Tuesday ==
Network		7:00 PM	7:30 PM	8:00 PM	8:30 PM	9:00 PM	9:30 PM	10:00 PM	10:30 PM
ABC	Fall	Kukla, Fran and Ollie (7:00) / John Daly and the News (7:15)	**Warner Bros. Presents** / **Kings Row** / **Cheyenne** / **Casablanca**		**The Life and Legend of Wyatt Earp**	Make Room for Daddy	Du Pont Cavalcade Theater	**Talent Varieties**	Local Programming
ABC	Summer	Kukla, Fran and Ollie (7:00) / John Daly and the News (7:15)	**Warner Bros. Presents** / **Kings Row** / **Cheyenne** / **Casablanca**		**The Life and Legend of Wyatt Earp**	**G.E. Summer Originals**	Du Pont Cavalcade Theater	**Talent Varieties**	Local Programming
CBS	Fall	Local (7:00) / Douglas Edwards with the News (7:15)	Name That Tune	**Navy Log**	**You'll Never Get Rich** (30/28.1)	Meet Millie	The Red Skelton Show (In COLOR) (14/32.3)	The $64,000 Question (1/47.5)	My Favorite Husband
CBS	November	Local (7:00) / Douglas Edwards with the News (7:15)	Name That Tune	**The Phil Silvers Show** (30/28.1)	**Navy Log**	Meet Millie	The Red Skelton Show (In COLOR) (14/32.3)	The $64,000 Question (1/47.5)	My Favorite Husband
NBC	Fall	Local	The Dinah Shore Show (7:30) / Plymouth News Caravan (7:45)	The Milton Berle Show (In COLOR) / The Martha Raye Show / **The Chevy Show** (29/28.2)		Fireside Theatre (24/29.0)	Armstrong Circle Theatre / **Pontiac Presents Playwrights '56** (alternating)		Big Town
NBC	Summer	Local	The Dinah Shore Show (7:30) / Plymouth News Caravan (7:45)	Dear Phoebe	This Is Show Business	**Sneak Preview**	**The Kaiser Aluminum Hour**		Big Town

Notes: The Martha Raye Show and The Chevy Show appeared monthly. As of November 1, You'll Never Get Rich officially became The Phil Silvers Show, swapping time periods with Navy Log.

On NBC, Dear Phoebe consisted entirely of reruns of the series from the 1954–1955 season.

Premiering on the same evening at the same time, G.E. Summer Originals on ABC and Sneak Preview on NBC were the first U.S. anthology series composed of unsold television pilots.

== Wednesday ==
Network		7:00 PM	7:30 PM	8:00 PM	8:30 PM	9:00 PM	9:30 PM	10:00 PM	10:30 PM
ABC		Kukla, Fran and Ollie (7:00) / John Daly and the News (7:15)	Disneyland (4/37.4)		**MGM Parade**	Masquerade Party	Break the Bank	**The Wednesday Night Fights***	
CBS	Fall	Local (7:00) / Douglas Edwards with the News (7:15)	**Brave Eagle**	Arthur Godfrey and His Friends		The Millionaire (9/33.8)	I've Got a Secret (10/33.5)	The United States Steel Hour / **The 20th Century Fox Hour**	
CBS	Summer	Local (7:00) / Douglas Edwards with the News (7:15)	**CBS Cartoon Theatre**	Arthur Godfrey and His Friends		The Millionaire (9/33.8)	I've Got a Secret (10/33.5)	The United States Steel Hour / **The 20th Century Fox Hour**	
DMN	Fall	Local Programming				**Hollywood Preview**	What's the Story**	Local Programming	
DMN	October	Local Programming				**Hollywood Preview**	Local Programming		
DMN	Winter	Local Programming							
NBC		Local Programming	Coke Time with Eddie Fisher (7:30) / Camel News Caravan (7:45)	**Screen Director's Playhouse**	Father Knows Best	Kraft Television Theater		This Is Your Life (26/28.8)	Midwestern Hayride

* Formerly Pabst Blue Ribbon Bouts on CBS.

** What's the Story aired only until September 23 before being cancelled.

== Thursday ==
Network	7:00 PM	7:30 PM	8:00 PM	8:30 PM	9:00 PM	9:30 PM	10:00 PM	10:30 PM
ABC	Kukla, Fran and Ollie (7:00) / John Daly and the News (7:15)	The Lone Ranger	Life is Worth Living	Stop the Music	Star Tonight	Down You Go	**Outside U.S.A.**	Local
CBS	Local (7:00) / Douglas Edwards with the News (7:15)	**Sergeant Preston of the Yukon**	The Bob Cummings Show	Climax! (22/29.6) / Shower of Stars (once a month)		Four Star Playhouse	**The Johnny Carson Show**	**Wanted**
NBC	Local	The Dinah Shore Show (7:30) / Plymouth News Caravan (7:45)	You Bet Your Life (7/35.4)	**The People’s Choice**	Dragnet (8/35.0)	Ford Theatre (In COLOR) (12/32.4) (Tied with Private Secretary)	Lux Video Theatre (25/28.9)	

== Friday ==
Network		7:00 PM	7:30 PM	8:00 PM	8:30 PM	9:00 PM	9:30 PM	10:00 PM	10:30 PM
ABC	Fall	Kukla, Fran and Ollie (7:00) / John Daly and the News (7:15)	The Adventures of Rin Tin Tin	The Adventures of Ozzie and Harriet	**Crossroads**	Dollar a Second	The Vise	Ethel and Albert	Local
ABC	Summer	Kukla, Fran and Ollie (7:00) / John Daly and the News (7:15)	The Adventures of Rin Tin Tin	**Combat Sergeant**	**Crossroads**	Dollar a Second	The Vise	Ethel and Albert	Local
CBS		Local (7:00) / Douglas Edwards with the News (7:15)	**The Adventures of Champion**	Mama	Our Miss Brooks	**Crusader**	Schlitz Playhouse of Stars	The Lineup (17/30.8)	Person to Person
DMN	Fall	Local Programming							
DMN	Winter	Local Programming							**Hollywood Preview**
DMN	Spring	Local Programming							
NBC	Fall	Local	Coke Time with Eddie Fisher (7:30) / Camel News Caravan (7:45)	Truth or Consequences	The Life of Riley (21/29.9)	The Big Story	**Star Stage**	Gillette Cavalcade of Sports (10:00) / Red Barber's Corner (10:45)	
NBC	Summer	Local	Coke Time with Eddie Fisher (7:30) / Camel News Caravan (7:45)	Truth or Consequences	The Best in Mystery		**Star Stage**	Gillette Cavalcade of Sports (10:00) / Red Barber's Corner (10:45)	
NBC	Follow-up	Local	Coke Time with Eddie Fisher (7:30) / Camel News Caravan (7:45)	Truth or Consequences	**Star Stage**			Gillette Cavalcade of Sports (10:00) / Red Barber's Corner (10:45)	

Note: On NBC, The Best in Mystery consisted entirely of reruns of episodes of Four Star Playhouse seen previously on CBS.

== Saturday ==
Network		7:00 PM	7:30 PM	8:00 PM	8:30 PM	9:00 PM	9:30 PM	10:00 PM	10:30 PM
ABC		Local	Ozark Jubilee			**Lawrence Welk's Dodge Dancing Party**		Tomorrow's Careers	Local
CBS	Fall	The Gene Autry Show	Beat the Clock	Stage Show	**The Honeymooners** (19/30.2)	Two for the Money	**It's Always Jan**	**Gunsmoke**	Damon Runyon Theater
CBS	July	The Gene Autry Show	Beat the Clock	Stage Show	**The Honeymooners** (19/30.2)	Two for the Money	**It's Always Jan**	**Gunsmoke**	**High Finance**
NBC	Fall	Local	**The Big Surprise**	The Perry Como Show (18/30.3)		People Are Funny (27/28.4) (Tied with The George Burns and Gracie Allen Show)	Texaco Star Theater (In COLOR)	The George Gobel Show (15/31.9)	Your Hit Parade (23/29.1)
NBC	Summer	Local	**The Big Surprise**	**The Julius LaRosa Show** (13 weeks)		People Are Funny (27/28.4) (Tied with The George Burns and Gracie Allen Show)	The Jimmy Durante Show	**Encore Theatre**	Your Hit Parade (23/29.1)

Notes:

- On ABC, Grand Ole Opry made its debut as a monthly series, airing 8–9 p.m. from October 15, 1955, to September 26, 1956. On CBS, Ford Star Jubilee made its debut as a monthly series, airing 9:30–11 p.m. On NBC, Max Liebman Presents aired as a monthly series, 9–10:30 p.m.
- High Finance, hosted by Dennis James, debuted on July 7, 1956, at 10:30 on CBS. It ran until December 15, 1956. It replaced The Damon Runyon Theater.
- On NBC, the 1956 version of the summer series Encore Theatre consisted of reruns of episodes of Pepsi Cola Playhouse and Studio 57.

== By network ==
=== ABC ===
**Returning Series**

- The Adventures of Ozzie and Harriet
- The Adventures of Rin-Tin-Tin
- The Big Picture
- Break the Bank
- Chance of a Lifetime (moved from DuMont)
- Cheyenne
- Disneyland
- Dollar a Second
- The Dotty Mack Show
- Down You Go
- Du Pont Cavalcade Theater
- Ethel and Albert
- John Daly and the News
- Kukla, Fran and Ollie
- Life Begins at Eighty
- Life is Worth Living
- The Lone Ranger
- Make Room for Daddy
- Masquerade Party
- The Original Amateur Hour
- Ozark Jubilee
- Paris Precinct
- Star Tonight
- Stop the Music
- Tomorrow's Careers
- TV Reader's Digest
- The Vise
- The Voice of Firestone
- You Asked for It

**New Series**

- **The Alcoa Hour**
- **Casablanca**
- **Cheyenne**
- **Combat Sergeant** *
- **Crossroads**
- **Down You Go**
- **Famous Film Festival**
- **G.E. Summer Originals** *
- **Grand Ole Opry**
- **It's Polka Time** *
- **Kings Row**
- **Lawrence Welk's Dodge Dancing Party**
- **The Life and Legend of Wyatt Earp**
- **Medical Horizons**
- **MGM Parade**
- **Outside U.S.A.**
- **Press Conference** *
- **Talent Varieties**
- **Warner Bros. Presents**

Not returning from 1954–55:

- Boxing from Eastern Parkway
- Cavalcade of America
- College Press Conference
- Come Closer
- The Elgin TV Hour
- Enterprise
- Fight Talk
- Flight No. 7
- Jamie
- The Jane Pickens Show
- Let's See
- The Mail Story
- The Martha Wright Show
- Mr. Citizen
- The Name's the Same
- Pond's Theater
- The Ray Bolger Show
- The Saturday Night Fights
- So You Want to Lead a Band
- Soldier Parade
- Star Tonight
- The Stork Club
- The Stu Erwin Show
- Talent Patrol
- Treasury Men in Action
- Twenty Questions
- What's Going On
- Where's Raymond?

=== CBS ===
**Returning Series**

- The $64,000 Question
- Appointment with Adventure
- Arthur Godfrey and His Friends
- Arthur Godfrey's Talent Scouts
- Beat the Clock
- The Bob Cummings Show (moved from NBC)
- Climax!
- Damon Runyon Theater
- December Bride
- Douglas Edwards with the News
- The Ed Sullivan Show
- Four Star Playhouse
- Frankie Laine Time
- The Gene Autry Show
- General Electric Theater
- The George Burns and Gracie Allen Show
- The Herb Shriner Show
- I Love Lucy
- I've Got a Secret
- The Jack Benny Show
- Lassie
- The Lineup
- Mama
- Meet Millie
- The Millionaire
- My Favorite Husband
- Name That Tune
- Omnibus
- Our Miss Brooks
- Person to Person
- Private Secretary
- The Red Skelton Show
- Schlitz Playhouse of Stars
- Shower of Stars
- Stage Show
- Studio One
- Two for the Money
- The United States Steel Hour (moved from ABC)
- What's My Line?

**New Series**

- **The 20th Century Fox Hour**
- **The $64,000 Challenge** *
- **The Adventures of Champion**
- **The Adventures of Robin Hood**
- **Alfred Hitchcock Presents**
- **Brave Eagle**
- **CBS Cartoon Theatre** *
- **Crusader**
- **Ford Star Jubilee**
- **Gunsmoke**
- **High Finance** *
- **Hollywood Summer Theater** *
- **The Honeymooners**
- **It's Always Jan**
- **Joe and Mabel**
- **The Johnny Carson Show**
- **My Friend Flicka** *
- **Navy Log**
- **Sergeant Preston of the Yukon**
- **Tales of the Texas Rangers**
- **Telephone Time** *
- **The Vic Damone Show** *
- **Wanted**
- **You'll Never Get Rich**

Not returning from 1954–55:

- America's Greatest Bands
- The Best of Broadway
- The Blue Angel
- Danger
- Father Knows Best (moved to NBC)
- The Halls of Ivy
- Honestly, Celeste!
- Life with Father
- Music 55
- Pabst Blue Ribbon Bouts (moved to ABC, renamed to The Wednesday Night Fights)
- The Public Defender
- The Ray Milland Show
- See It Now
- Sports Spot
- Stage 7
- Strike It Rich
- That's My Boy
- Topper
- What in the World?
- Willy
- Windows
- Your Play Time

=== DuMont ===
**Returning series**

- At Ringside
- Boxing from St. Nicholas Arena
- What's the Story

**New series**

- **Hollywood Preview**

Not returning from 1954–55:

- Captain Video
- Chance of a Lifetime
- Concert Tonight
- DuMont Evening News
- Flash Gordon
- The Ilona Massey Show
- It's Alec Templeton Time
- Life Begins at Eighty
- The Music Show
- National Football League Professional Football
- One Minute Please
- Opera Cameos
- The Paul Dixon Show
- Rocky King, Inside Detective
- Studio 57
- The Stranger
- They Stand Accused
- Time Will Tell

=== NBC ===
**Returning Series**

- Armstrong Circle Theatre
- Big Town
- Caesar's Hour
- Camel News Caravan
- The Chevy Show
- Coke Time with Eddie Fisher
- Colgate Variety Hour
- Dragnet
- Father Knows Best (Moved from CBS)
- Fireside Theatre
- Ford Theatre
- The George Gobel Show
- Gillette Cavalcade of Sports
- Goodyear Television Playhouse
- It's a Great Life
- The Jimmy Durante Show
- Justice
- Kraft Television Theatre
- The Life of Riley
- The Loretta Young Show
- Lux Video Theatre
- The Martha Raye Show
- Max Liebman Presents
- Medic
- Midwestern Hayride
- The Milton Berle Show
- People Are Funny
- The Perry Como Show (moved from CBS)
- Producers' Showcase
- Red Barber's Corner
- Robert Montgomery Presents
- Texaco Star Theater
- This Is Your Life
- The Tony Martin Show
- Truth or Consequences
- You Bet Your Life
- Your Hit Parade

**New Series**

- **Adventure Theater** *
- **The Alcoa Hour**
- **The Big Surprise**
- **Encore Theatre** *
- **Frontier**
- **The Golden Touch of Frankie Carle** *
- **Hollywood Today** *
- **The Julius LaRosa Show** *
- **The Kaiser Aluminum Hour** *
- **The NBC Comedy Hour** *
- **The People's Choice**
- **Pontiac Presents Playwrights '56**
- **Screen Directors Playhouse**
- **Sneak Preview** *
- **Star Stage**
- **Wide Wide World**

Not returning from 1954–55:

- The Amazing Dunninger
- And Here‘s the Show
- The Bob Cummings Show (moved to CBS)
- The Bob Hope Show
- The Buick-Berle Show
- Cameo Theatre
- Commando Cody: Sky Marshal of the Universe
- The Donald O'Connor Show
- Goodyear Television Playhouse
- The Greatest Moments in Sports
- The Hunter
- I Married Joan
- The Imogene Coca Show
- The Jack Carson Show
- Make the Connection
- The Mickey Rooney Show: Hey, Mulligan
- Mister Peepers
- Musical Chairs
- My Little Margie
- Norby
- The Philco Television Playhouse
- Place the Face
- The Red Buttons Show
- The Soldiers
- Watch Mr. Wizard

Note: The * indicates that the program was introduced in midseason.
