= 1956 in television =

The year 1956 in television involved some significant events. Below is a list of television-related events during 1956.

== Events ==
- January 1 – Beleteleradio begins transmissions as the first television channel in Belarus.
- January 25–February 5 – The 1956 Winter Olympics staged at Cortina d'Ampezzo in Italy are the first multi-sport event to be televised to an international audience, although the broadcasts are not monetized. Warsaw Pact countries have the technology to be able to broadcast coverage with a communist slant into Finland and parts of West Germany and Austria.
- January 28 – Elvis Presley makes his national television debut on CBS in the United States on the program Stage Show, the first of six appearances on the series.
- January 30 – NBC swaps its Cleveland radio and TV stations to Westinghouse Broadcasting in exchange for Westinghouse's own Philadelphia radio and TV stations. The trade is eventually reversed in 1965.
- February 14 – Television broadcasting begins in Azerbaijan (AzTV), at this time the Azerbaijan Soviet Socialist Republic.
- February 17 – The English Midlands becomes the first part of the United Kingdom outside London to receive Independent Television (ITV), when the Associated Television Network (as ATV Midlands) begins broadcasting their weekday franchise. The weekend franchise, ABC Weekend TV, begins operation a day later.
- February – U.M. & M. TV Corporation acquires the pre-October 1950 Paramount Pictures cartoons and theatrical shorts, except for the Popeye and Superman cartoons.
- March 21 – TES-TV begins regular broadcasting as the first television channel in Finland.
- April 2 – As the World Turns and The Edge of Night premiere on CBS as the first half-hour American soap operas. Previously, all soap operas have been just fifteen minutes in length.
- April 3 – Elvis Presley appears on The Milton Berle Show in the United States.
- April 14 – Ampex company demonstrates a videotape recorder at the 1956 NARTB (later National Association of Broadcasters) convention in Chicago, using the first practical and commercially successful videotape format known as 2" Quadruplex. The three networks place orders for the recorders.
- April
  - WNBQ (modern-day WMAQ-TV) in Chicago becomes the first TV station to broadcast all its local programming in color.
  - United States Senator Estes Kefauver holds congressional hearings on the rising rates of juvenile crime and publishes an article in Reader's Digest named "Let's Get Rid of Tele-Violence."
- May 2 – Baghdad Television (BTV) goes on the air as the first television station in Iraq.
- May 3 – Granada Television begins broadcasting, extending ITV's coverage to Northern England. ABC Weekend TV's weekend franchise begins operation two days later.
- May 6 – Elvis Presley again appears on The Milton Berle Show.
- May 12 – HLKZ-TV began transmissions in South Korea.
- May 21 – Estes Kefauver and Adlai Stevenson participate in the first televised US presidential primary debate.
- May 24 – The European Broadcasting Union (EBU) held the first edition of the Eurovision Song Contest in Lugano, Switzerland, hosted by Radio svizzera italiana (RSI) on behalf of the Swiss Broadcasting Corporation (SRG SSR).
- June 5 – Elvis Presley performs "Hound Dog" on The Milton Berle Show, scandalizing the audience with his suggestive hip movements.
- July 1 – Elvis Presley appears on The Steve Allen Show.
- July 3 – The first two American anthology series composed of unsold television pilots, ABC's G.E. Summer Originals and NBC's Sneak Preview, premiere simultaneously at 9:00 p.m. Eastern Daylight Time.
- July – HSV 7 Melbourne begins test transmissions.
- August 5 – KUAM-TV becomes the first television station in Guam.
- August 6 – Final telecast of the DuMont Television Network. The United States will not have a fourth major network until the launch of the Fox network in 1986.
- September – NBC introduces a still version of its peacock color logo.
- September 4 – Television broadcasting begins in Sweden as Radiotjänst TV goes on the air.
- September 9 – Elvis Presley appears on The Ed Sullivan Show in the United States for the first time.
- September 15 – Gabriel J. Fontana wins a record US$64,000 from the Super Bonus Stunt on Beat the Clock.
- September 16 – TCN-9 Sydney becomes the first Australian television station to begin regular transmission.
- October 1 – Ernie Kovacs becomes the host for NBC's The Tonight Show in the United States on Mondays and Tuesdays.
- October 8 – New York Yankees pitcher Don Larsen throws the first (and to date only) perfect game in World Series history. Mel Allen (representing the Yankees) and Vin Scully (representing the Brooklyn Dodgers) call the game for NBC.
- October 28 – Televisión Española (TVE) begins its regular broadcasts on its first channel, from Madrid, Spain, becoming the country's first regular television station.
- October 29
  - First use of videotape in network television programming; CBS uses its Ampex VTR to record the evening news, anchored by Douglas Edwards. The tape is then fed to West Coast stations three hours later.
  - Chet Huntley and David Brinkley take over anchor duties of the NBC evening newscast in the United States, which is renamed The Huntley-Brinkley Report.
- November 3 – The 1939 MGM movie The Wizard of Oz is shown on television for the first time in the United States, by CBS; the viewing audience is estimated at 45 million people.
- November 4 – HSV 7 officially inaugurates on the air in Melbourne, Australia, soon after the Australia Government starts issuing television licences.
- November 5 – The Australian Broadcasting Corporation makes its first television broadcast from its Sydney studios. It is inaugurated by Prime Minister Robert Menzies.
- November 19 – The Australian Broadcasting Corporation begins broadcast in Melbourne. Along with its Sydney counterpart, they air the 1956 Summer Olympics.
- November – The first use of videotape for a network television entertainment program. Jonathan Winters uses videotape and superimposing techniques to be able to play two characters in the same skit for his NBC television show.
- December 24 – Algeria's TV1 broadcasts for the first time as RTF Television Algiers, making it the first television network in the country.
- December 31 – Game series host Bob Barker makes his national television debut in the United States on the program Truth or Consequences.
- Portable TV sets (black and white) are first marketed.

== Programs/programmes ==
- Adventures of Superman (1952–1958)
- Alfred Hitchcock Presents (1955–1962)
- American Bandstand (1952–1989)
- Annie Oakley (1954–1957)
- Bozo the Clown (1949–present)
- Candid Camera (1948–present)
- Captain Kangaroo (1955–1984)
- Cheyenne (1955–1962)
- Climax! (1954–1958)
- Come Dancing (UK) (1949–1995)
- Disneyland (1954–1958)
- Dixon of Dock Green (UK) (1955–1976)
- Dragnet (1951–1959)
- Face the Nation (1954–present)
- General Motors Theatre (Can) (1953–1956, 1958–1961)
- Gillette Cavalcade of Sports (1946–1960)
- Gunsmoke (1955–1975)
- Hallmark Hall of Fame (1951–present)
- Howdy Doody (1947–1960)
- I Love Lucy (1951–1960)
- Kraft Television Theatre (1947–1958)
- Kukla, Fran and Ollie (1947–1957)
- Life is Worth Living (1952–1957)
- Love of Life (1951–1980)
- Meet the Press (1947–present)
- The Mickey Mouse Club (1955–1959)
- Our Miss Brooks (1952–1956)
- Ozark Jubilee (1955–1960)
- Panorama (UK) (1953–present)
- Search for Tomorrow (1951–1986)
- Sergeant Preston of the Yukon (1955–1958)
- The Adventures of Ozzie and Harriet (1952–1966)
- The Brighter Day (1954–1962)
- The Ed Sullivan Show (1948–1972)
- The George Burns and Gracie Allen Show (1950–1958)
- The Good Old Days (UK) (1953–1983)
- The Grove Family (UK) (1954–1957)
- The Guiding Light (1952–2009)
- The Jack Benny Program (1950–1965)
- The Jane Wyman Show, Fireside Theatre (1949–1958)
- The Lawrence Welk Show (1955–1982)
- The Milton Berle Show (1954–1967)
- The Roy Rogers Show (1951–1957)
- The Secret Storm (1954–1974)
- The Today Show (1952–present)
- The Tonight Show (1954–present)
- The Voice of Firestone (1949–1963)
- This Is Your Life (UK) (1955–1964, 1969–2003)
- This Is Your Life (US) (1952–1961)
- Truth or Consequences (1950–1988)
- What's My Line (1950–1967)
- Your Hit Parade (1950–1959)
- Zoo Quest (UK) (1954–1964)

=== Debuts ===
- January 3 – Queen for a Day (1956–1964)
- February 10 – My Friend Flicka (1956–1958)
- March 5 – The Gordon MacRae Show (1956) on NBC.
- March 20 – Guy Lombardo's Diamond Jubilee (1956)
- April 2
  - As the World Turns (1956–2010)
  - The Edge of Night (1956–1984)
- April 26 – The Eddy Arnold Show on ABC
- July 3
  - G.E. Summer Originals on ABC
  - Sneak Preview on NBC
- July 6 – Hancock's Half Hour, broadcast by BBC Television (1956–1962)
- July 7 – High Finance, hosted by Dennis James, on CBS (1956)
- July 8 – The drama series Armchair Theatre, produced by ABC Weekend TV for the ITV network, begins its long run in the UK (1956–1968)
- July 13 – It's Polka Time on ABC (1956–1957)
- July 30 – NBC Bandstand (simulcast of portion of radio program) on NBC (1956).
- September 7 – The Adventures of Jim Bowie on ABC (1956–1958)
- September 8 – Hey, Jeannie! starring Jeannie Carson on CBS (1956–57, then 1958 in syndication as The Jeannie Carson Show)
- September 15 – The Adventures of Sir Lancelot (UK) on ITV (After being sold to the NBC network in the United States, it later becomes the first British television series ever to be made in colour, in this case it wouldn't premiere in the United States until 9 days later on September 24, 1956) (1956–57)
- September 18 – Noah's Ark, featuring Paul Burke debuts on NBC (1956–1957)
- September 25 – State Trooper featuring Rod Cameron premieres in syndication (1956–1959)
- September 29 – The Gale Storm Show premieres on CBS (1956–1960)
- October 4 – In the USA
  - Playhouse 90 (1956–1961)
  - The Ford Show, "Starring Tennessee Ernie Ford" (1956–1961)
- October 5 - The Walter Winchell Show (1956)
- October 27 – Accent on Strings (1956, Sydney Australia, debuts on the first "official" day of television in Australia)
- October 29 – Fun Farm (1956–1957, first Australian-produced children's television series)
- November 9
  - The Isador Goodman Show (1956–1957, Melbourne Australia)
  - Stairway to the Stars (1956–1958, Melbourne Australia)
- November 11 – Air Power, narrated by Walter Cronkite, on CBS (1956–1957)
- November 15 – TV Channell (1956–1957, Sydney and Melbourne Australia)
- November 21 – Can Do (1956) debuts on NBC.
- November 26 – The Price Is Right game series premieres (1956–1965).
- December 3 – Sydney Tonight (1956–1959, Sydney Australia)
- Opportunity Knocks on ITV (UK) (1956–1978)
- The Steve Allen Show premieres in the US (1956–1960)
- What the Papers Say on ITV (UK) (1956–2008)

=== Ending this year ===
Date	Show	Debut
January 12	Wanted	1955
February 27	The Tony Martin Show	1954
March 5	Medical Horizons	1955
March 19	Jungle Jim	1955
March 25	Justice	1954
April 28	It's Always Jan	1955
June 3	It's a Great Life	1954
June 14	Stop the Music	1954
June 23	The Jimmy Durante Show	1954
August 14	Sneak Preview	1956
August 27	The Gordon MacRae Show	1956
September 11	This Is Show Business	1956
September 18	G.E. Summer Originals	1956
September 22	The Honeymooners	1955
November 2	NBC Bandstand	1956
December 31	Can Do	1956
Unknown	Cisco Kid	1950
Unknown	Super Circus	1949

== Births ==
Date	Name	Notability
January 3	Mel Gibson	American actor
January 6	Holly Fulger	American actress (Anything but Love, Ellen)
January 7	David Caruso	American actor (NYPD Blue, CSI: Miami)
January 9	Imelda Staunton	English actress (Up the Garden Path, The Crown)
January 9	Kimberly Beck	American actress (Peyton Place)
January 13	Janet Hubert	American actress (The Fresh Prince of Bel-Air)
January 20	Bill Maher	American comedian and talk-show host (Real Time with Bill Maher)
January 20	Richard Morecroft	Australian newsreader and television presenter (ABC News NSW)
January 21	Geena Davis	American actress (Buffalo Bill, The Geena Davis Show, Commander in Chief)
January 23	Natalie West	American actress (Roseanne)
January 27	Susanne Blakeslee	American actress (The Fairly OddParents, Rapunzel's Tangled Adventure, DuckTales, The Secret Saturdays)
February 6	Jon Walmsley	British-American actor (The Waltons)
February 11	Catherine Hickland	Actress (One Life to Live)
February 11	Deena Freeman	Actress (Too Close for Comfort)
February 12	Arsenio Hall	Actor, comedian and talk-show host (The Arsenio Hall Show)
February 13	Paul Stojanovich	Producer (died 2003)
February 17	Richard Karn	Actor (Home Improvement), game show host
February 19	Kathleen Beller	Actress (Dynasty)
February 25	Jean Bruce Scott	Actress (Airwolf)
February 27	Tim Brando	Sportscaster
February 29	Jonathan Coleman	Presenter (died 2021)
March 1	Tim Daly	Actor (Wings, Superman: The Animated Series, Private Practice, Madam Secretary)
March 7	Bryan Cranston	Actor (Malcolm in the Middle, Breaking Bad)
March 8	John Kapelos	Actor
March 11	Rob Paulsen	Voice actor (Animaniacs, Pinky and the Brain, Dexter's Laboratory, The Powerpuff Girls, The Fairly OddParents, Time Squad, Kim Possible, The Adventures of Jimmy Neutron, Boy Genius, Danny Phantom, Catscratch, Coconut Fred's Fruit Salad Island, T.U.F.F. Puppy, Teenage Mutant Ninja Turtles)
March 13	Dana Delany	Actress (China Beach, Body of Proof, Superman: The Animated Series)
April 3	Ray Combs	Game show host (Family Feud) (died 1996)
April 5	Diamond Dallas Page	Actor and professional wrestler
April 12	Andy Garcia	Actor
April 18	Melody Thomas Scott	Actress (The Young and the Restless)
April 18	John James	Actor (The Colbys)
April 23	Kevin Meaney	Comedian (died 2016)
April 28	Nancy Lee Grahn	Actress (Santa Barbara, General Hospital)
April 29	Susan Pratt	Actress (General Hospital, Guiding Light, All My Children)
May 1	Byron Stewart	Actor (The White Shadow, St. Elsewhere)
May 9	Mary Mapes	Producer
May 9	Wendy Crewson	Actress
May 17	Bob Saget	Actor and host (Full House, America's Funniest Home Videos) (died 2022)
May 19	Steven Ford	Actor
May 20	Dean Butler	Actor (Little House on the Prairie)
June 1	Tom Irwin	Actor (My So-Called Life, Devious Maids)
June 4	Keith David	Actor (Gargoyles, Adventure Time, Greenleaf)
June 5	Nicolette Goulet	Actress (died 2008)
June 7	L.A. Reid	Record producer
June 18	Brian Benben	Actor (Dream On, Private Practice)
June 22	Tim Russ	Actor (Star Trek: Voyager)
June 23	Randy Jackson	Judge (American Idol)
June 24	Joe Penny	English-born actor (Riptide, Jake and the Fatman)
June 25	Anthony Bourdain	Chef (died 2018)
June 25	Bob West	Actor (Barney & Friends)
June 30	David Alan Grier	Actor and comedian (In Living Color)
July 1	Alan Ruck	Actor (Spin City, The Exorcist)
July 5	Louis Herthum	Actor
July 6	Casey Sander	Actor (Grace Under Fire)
July 9	Tom Hanks	Actor (Bosom Buddies)
July 11	Sela Ward	Actress (Sisters, Once and Again, CSI: NY)
July 12	Mel Harris	Actress (thirtysomething)
July 20	Dwayne Wayans	Composer
July 30	Delta Burke	Actress (Designing Women)
July 31	Michael Biehn	Actor
August 5	Maureen McCormick	Actress (Marcia on The Brady Bunch)
August 6	Stepfanie Kramer	Actress (Hunter)
August 7	Bill Griffeth	Host
August 8	Nathan Wang	Composer
August 10	Peter Robbins	Voice actor (original voice of Charlie Brown in the Peanuts specials) (died 2022)
August 14	Jackée Harry	Actress and comedian (Sister, Sister, Everybody Hates Chris)
August 19	Adam Arkin	Actor (Chicago Hope)
August 21	Kim Cattrall	Actress (Sex and the City)
August 23	Skipp Sudduth	Actor (Third Watch)
August 26	Brett Cullen	Actor (The Chisholms, The Simple Life, Legacy)
August 28	Russell Curry	Soap opera actor
September 1	Sachi Parker	Actress
September 8	Maurice Cheeks	NBA basketball player
September 20	Gary Cole	Actor (Midnight Caller, Harvey Birdman, Attorney at Law, Kim Possible, Veep)
September 20	Debbi Morgan	Actress (All My Children, The Young and the Restless)
September 26	Linda Hamilton	Actress (Beauty and the Beast)
October 1	Theresa May	Politician
October 2	Charlie Adler	Voice actor (Tiny Toon Adventures, Rocko's Modern Life, Aaahh!!! Real Monsters, Cow and Chicken, Brandy & Mr. Whiskers, Pet Alien)
October 8	Stephanie Zimbalist	Actress (Remington Steele)
October 18	Craig Bartlett	Animator and voice actor (Hey Arnold!)
October 21	Jim Watkins	American anchor
November 10	Sinbad	Comedian and actor (A Different World, Houseguest)
November 13	Rex Linn	Actor (CSI: Miami)
November 18	Ramona Singer	American television personality
November 19	Ann Curry	Journalist
November 22	Richard Kind	Actor (Mad About You, Spin City)
November 24	Ruben Santiago-Hudson	Actor (Castle)
November 27	William Fichtner	Actor (Prison Break)
December 2	Steven Bauer	Actor (Breaking Bad, Ray Donovan)
December 4	Bernard King	NBA basketball player
December 7	Larry Bird	NBA basketball player
December 17	Michael J. Weithorn	Writer
December 18	Ron White	Actor
December 24	Stephanie Hodge	Actress (Unhappily Ever After)
December 30	Patricia Kalember	Actress (Sisters)
December 30	Sheryl Lee Ralph	Actress (Moesha, Instant Mom)

== Television debuts ==
- Norman Alden – NBC Matinee Theater
- R. G. Armstrong – The West Point Story
- James Cagney – Robert Montgomery Presents
- Sydney Chaplin – Kings Row
- Sean Connery – Dixon of Dock Green
- Bing Crosby – Ford Star Jubilee
- Bette Davis – The 20th Century-Fox Hour
- Patty Duke – Armstrong Circle Theatre
- Clint Eastwood – TV Reader's Digest
- Nigel Hawthorne – Cry Wolf!
- Rance Howard – Kraft Television Theatre
- George Kennedy – The Phil Silvers Show
- George Leech – ITV Television Playhouse
- Arthur Malet – Playwrights '56
- Jeanette MacDonald – Screen Directors Playhouse
- Vic Morrow – The Millionaire
- Jack Nicholson – NBC Matinee Theater
- Eddie Parker – Tales of the Texas Rangers
- George Peppard – The Big Story
- Claude Rich – Le revizor ou L'inspecteur général
- Paul Scofield – Play of the Week
- Barbara Stanwyck – Ford Theatre
- Rip Torn – Omnibus
- John Vernon – First Performance
