= Conflict (American TV series) =

American anthology TV series (1956–1957)

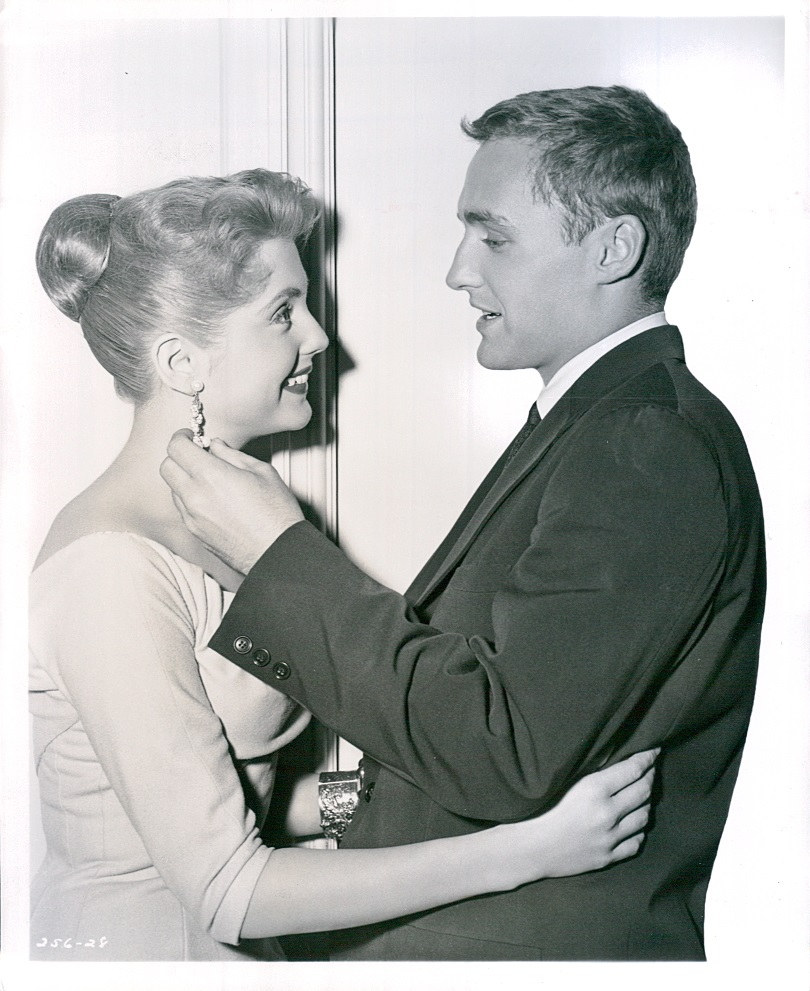
- Karen Sharpe and Dennis Hopper in the April 30, 1957 episode "No Man's Road"
- Genre: Anthology
- Country of origin: United States
- Original language: English
- No. of seasons: 2
- No. of episodes: 20

Production
- Executive producer: William T. Orr
- Producer: Roy Huggins
- Running time: 60 mins.
- Production company: Warner Bros. Television

Original release
- Network: ABC
- Release: 18 September 1956 – 3 September 1957

Related
- Warner Bros. Presents; 77 Sunset Strip Maverick

Conflict is an American anthology television series that was broadcast biweekly on ABC September 18, 1956 to September 3, 1957. Episodes focused on personal conflicts.

It succeeded Warner Bros. Presents. Although Conflict assumed the same time slot as its predecessor, the two do not share the same format. Where Warner Bros. Presents had been a wheel series, Conflict was fully an anthological series. However, since Cheyenne and Conflict alternated the Tuesday 7:30 P.M. time slot, the net effect was that of a proper wheel series—even though Cheyenne and Conflict were not under the same umbrella title.

The name change was imposed upon its production company, Warner Bros., by ABC executives who believed that "conflict" was the missing element in Casablanca and Kings Row from Warner Bros. Presents.

== "Man from 1997" ==
Actor James Garner caught producer Roy Huggins' attention with a comedic performance as a gambler in the series' sixth episode, a time travel scenario entitled "Man from 1997", leading Huggins to cast Garner as the lead the following year in his television series Maverick, according to Huggins' Archive of American Television interview.

In the episode, Charles Ruggles portrays an elderly time-traveling librarian from the future attempting to retrieve a 1997 almanac that he mistakenly left 41 years before it is supposed to exist. Garner portrays "Red," the brother of Maureen (Gloria Talbott); the show also stars Jacques Sernas as Johnny Vlakos.

Huggins noted in his Archive of American Television interview that he subsequently cast Garner as the lead in Maverick due to his comedic facial expressions while playing scenes in "Man from 1997" that were not originally written to be comical, leading staffers in the screening room watching the rushes to unexpectedly laugh. Huggins had written the scenes himself and realized that Garner was definitely adding the humor solely with his performance.

== Schedule ==
The series does not fit neatly into standard American television seasons, technically superseding Warner Bros. Presents after Casablanca concluded its run in April 1956 and apparently providing at least one week of new material at the beginning of the 1957 season, before Sugarfoot, starring Will Hutchins, replaced it. Hutchins was also cast in three episodes of Conflict, including his screen debut as Ed Masters in "The Magic Brew" (October 16, 1956).

== Production ==
William T. Orr was the executive producer, and Roy Huggins was the producer. David Buttolph was the composer of the theme for Conflict and for the scores for all episodes.
