= Nelson Gidding =

American screenwriter

- Born: Nelson Roosevelt Gidding; September 15, 1919; New York City, U.S.
- Died: May 2, 2004 (aged 84); Santa Monica, California
- Occupation: Screenwriter

Nelson Roosevelt Gidding (September 15, 1919 – May 2, 2004) was an American screenwriter specializing in film adaptation. A longtime collaboration with director Robert Wise began with Gidding's screenplay for I Want to Live! (1958), which earned him an Oscar nomination. His long-running course on screenwriting adaptions at the University of Southern California inspired screenwriters of the present generation, including David S. Goyer.

Gidding was born in New York City and attended school at Phillips Exeter Academy; as a young man he was friends with Norman Mailer. After graduating from Harvard University, he entered the Army Air Forces during World War II as the navigator on a Martin B-26 Marauder. His plane was shot down over Italy, but he survived; he spent 18 months as a POW but effected an escape. Returning from the war, in 1946 he published his only novel, End Over End, begun while captive in a German prison camp.

In 1949, Gidding married Hildegarde Colligan; together they had a son, Joshua Gidding, who today is a Seattle writer and college professor.

In Hollywood, Gidding entered work in television, writing for such series as Suspense and Sergeant Preston of the Yukon, and eventually moved into feature films like The Helen Morgan Story (1957), Odds Against Tomorrow (1959), The Haunting (1963), Lost Command (1966), The Andromeda Strain (1971), and The Hindenburg (1975).

After the death of his first wife on June 13, 1995, in 1998 Gidding married Chun-Ling Wang, a Chinese immigrant.

Gidding taught at USC until his death from congestive heart failure at a Santa Monica hospital in 2004.

== Filmography ==
Film

Year	Title	Notes
1953	The Triangle	Segment "American Duel"
1957	The Helen Morgan Story	
1958	Onionhead	
1958	I Want to Live!	
1959	Odds Against Tomorrow	
1962	Lisa	
1963	The Haunting	
1963	Nine Hours to Rama	
1966	Lost Command	
1970	Skullduggery	
1971	The Andromeda Strain	
1975	The Hindenburg	
1979	Beyond the Poseidon Adventure	
1987	The Misfit Brigade	
1991	Journey of Honor	
1993	The Mummy lives	

=== Television ===
Year	Title	Notes
1952	Hallmark Hall of Fame	1 Episode
1952	Hollywood Opening Night	1 Episode
1953	Rheingold Theater	1 Episode
1953	The Web	1 Episode
1954	The Stranger	2 Episodes
1954	Inner Sanctum	3 Episodes
1954	President for a Day	TV movie produced as an episode of Hallmark Hall of Fame
1954–55	The Man Behind the Badge	12 Episodes
1955	Kraft Television Theatre	1 Episode
1955	Warner Bros. Presents	1 Episode
1955–56	Casablanca	5 Episodes
1955–57	Sergeant Preston of the Yukon	52 Episodes; Also story editor
1956	Playwrights '56	1 Episode
1957	Schlitz Playhouse of Stars	2 Episodes
1960	Bourbon Street Beat	1 Episode
1972	Banyon	1 Episode
1983	Casablanca	1 Episode
1983	I Want to Live	TV movie

== Bibliography ==
- End Over End. Viking. 1946. OCLC 1804517.
