= Top-rated United States television programs of 1955–56 =

This table displays the top-rated primetime television series of the 1955–56 season as measured by Nielsen Media Research.

| Rank | Program | Network | Rating |
|---|---|---|---|
| 1 | The $64,000 Question | CBS | 47.5 |
| 2 | I Love Lucy | CBS | 46.1 |
| 3 | The Ed Sullivan Show | CBS | 39.5 |
| 4 | Disneyland | ABC | 37.4 |
| 5 | The Jack Benny Show | CBS | 37.2 |
| 6 | December Bride | CBS | 37.0 |
| 7 | You Bet Your Life | NBC | 35.4 |
| 8 | Dragnet | NBC | 35.0 |
| 9 | The Millionaire | CBS | 33.8 |
| 10 | I've Got a Secret | CBS | 33.5 |
| 11 | General Electric Theater | CBS | 32.9 |
| 12 | Private Secretary | CBS | 32.4 |
| 12 | Ford Theatre | NBC | 32.4 |
| 14 | The Red Skelton Show | CBS | 32.3 |
| 15 | The George Gobel Show | NBC | 31.9 |
| 16 | Arthur Godfrey's Talent Scouts | CBS | 31.1 |
| 17 | The Lineup | CBS | 30.8 |
| 18 | The Perry Como Show | NBC | 30.3 |
| 19 | The Honeymooners | CBS | 30.2 |
| 20 | The Adventures of Robin Hood | CBS | 30.1 |
| 21 | The Life of Riley | NBC | 29.9 |
| 22 | Climax! | CBS | 29.6 |
| 23 | Your Hit Parade | NBC | 29.1 |
| 24 | Fireside Theatre | NBC | 29.0 |
| 25 | Lux Video Theatre | NBC | 28.9 |
| 26 | This Is Your Life | NBC | 28.8 |
| 27 | People Are Funny | NBC | 28.4 |
| 27 | The George Burns and Gracie Allen Show | CBS | 28.4 |
| 29 | The Chevy Show | NBC | 28.2 |
| 30 | The Phil Silvers Show | CBS | 28.1 |
