= Inner Sanctum (TV series) =

American TV anthology series (1954)

Inner Sanctum is an American television anthology series based upon Inner Sanctum Mystery, the radio series of the same name. It was created and produced by Himan Brown. Its unseen host and narrator was Paul McGrath. Thirty-nine episodes were syndicated in 1954.

Guest stars included Kim Stanley, Jack Klugman, Beatrice Straight, Jack Warden, Martin Balsam, Jo Van Fleet, E.G. Marshall, and Mildred Dunnock.

Himan and Mende Brown were the producers. Mende Brown and Alan Neuman directed the show. Writers were Ed Adamson, Sam Elkin, Nelson Gidding, Doug Johnson, John Roeburt, Robert Sloane, and Louis Vittes.

Episodes were filmed in New York and syndicated by NBC Film Division for use on local TV stations.

== Critical response ==
Fred Remington wrote in The Pittsburgh Press that Inner Sanctum on TV brought back pleasant memories of listening to the radio version of the series, but the episodes' focus differed from those on radio. "The new, televised Inner Sanctum no longer deals with the occult", he wrote, "It has abandoned the ghosts of its radio days and decided to go along with the current fascination with neurotic disorders." Nevertheless, he described the episodes as "pretty entertaining yarns."

A review in the trade publication Variety commented that the series had not been adequately adapted for television. Based on viewing of three episodes, the review said that the show "makes use of radio techniques at the expense of screen treatment." It went on to cite "static camera work" and "the apparent talkiness of each episode", summarizing that a viewer could close his or her eyes and not miss anything from the story. The review added, "the actors seem wooden, the sets phony, and the stories trite."
