= Hollywood Preview =

- Starring: Conrad Nagel (host)
- Country of origin: United States
- Original language: English
- No. of seasons: 1
- No. of episodes: 74

Production
- Camera setup: Single-camera
- Running time: 30 minutes

Original release
- Network: DuMont Television Network
- Release: September 14, 1955 – June 1, 1956

Hollywood Preview is a 30-minute show aired on the DuMont Television Network from September 14, 1955, to June 1, 1956. The show, hosted by actor Conrad Nagel, featured Hollywood stars and clips of upcoming films.

== Broadcast history ==
The show had various time slots during its broadcast run. The show began as a weekly show (September 1955 to March 1956), then went to weekdays Monday through Friday for the final months (April to June 1956).

- Wednesday 9-9:30pm (14 September 1955 – 28 December 1955)
- Friday 10:30-11pm (6 January 1956 – 30 March 1956)
- Monday to Friday 4:30-5pm (2 April 1956 – 1 June 1956)

== Production and syndication ==
In the early fall of 1954 WOR-TV in New York carried the program with live interviews. It was produced by Bruce Balaban for Balsan Productions. Flamingo Films distributed the series. By mid-March 1955 the program had been sold in 16 markets. Promotions included tie-ins with local theaters to display billboards showing the station and time of local broadcasts of the program.

The program continued live on WOR with Frank Quinn doing interviews. Immediately after the live broadcast concluded, the syndicated version was filmed with Frank Farrell interviewing the same guests. Stations that carried the syndicated version included WTTG, the Dumont affiliate in Washington, D. C. Sterling Television acquired distribution rights for the series in 1956.

== Preservation status ==
As with most DuMont series, no episodes are known to exist.

== See also ==
- List of programs broadcast by the DuMont Television Network
- List of surviving DuMont Television Network broadcasts
- 1955-56 United States network television schedule

== Bibliography ==
- David Weinstein, The Forgotten Network: DuMont and the Birth of American Television (Philadelphia: Temple University Press, 2004) ISBN 1-59213-245-6
- Alex McNeil, Total Television, Fourth edition (New York: Penguin Books, 1980) ISBN 0-14-024916-8
- Tim Brooks and Earle Marsh, The Complete Directory to Prime Time Network TV Shows, Third edition (New York: Ballantine Books, 1964) ISBN 0-345-31864-1
