= MGM Parade =

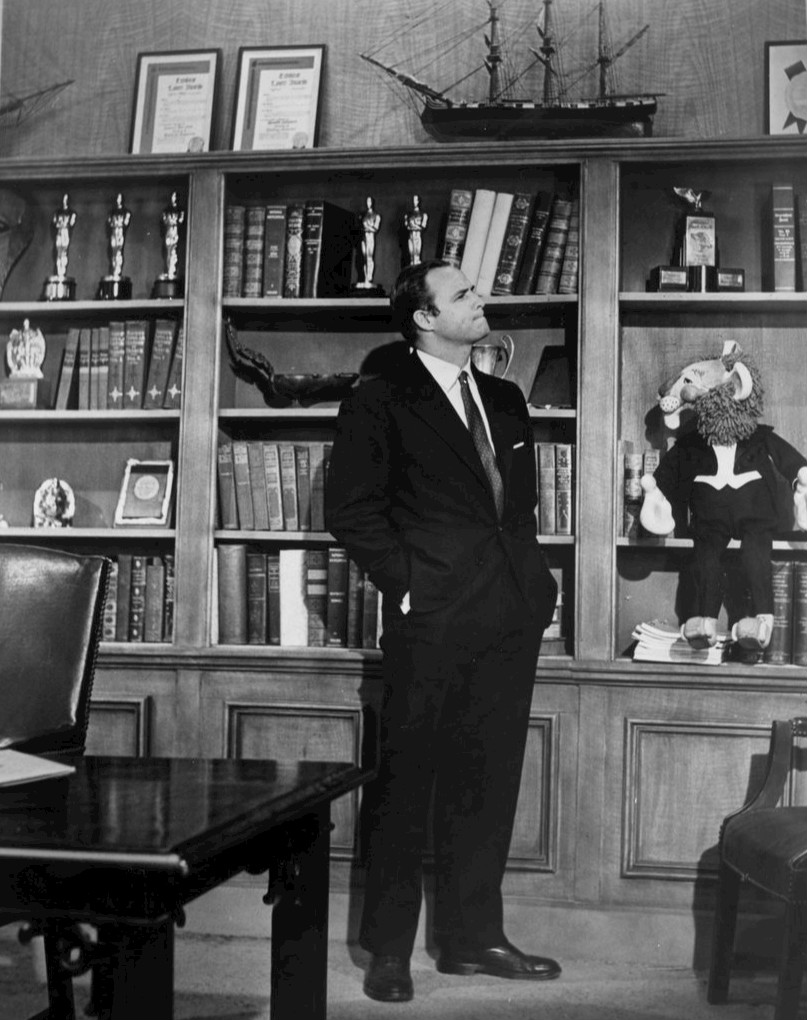
- Marlon Brando in a series episode, with "Little Leo"
- Genre: Documentary
- Starring: George Murphy (1955–56); Walter Pidgeon (1956)
- Theme music composer: Arthur Schwartz; Howard Dietz
- Opening theme: "That's Entertainment"
- Country of origin: United States
- Original language: English
- No. of seasons: 1
- No. of episodes: 34

Production
- Executive producer: Leslie Petersen
- Running time: 26 minutes (minus commercials)
- Production company: MGM Television

Original release
- Network: ABC
- Release: September 14, 1955 – May 2, 1956

MGM Parade is a documentary television series produced by Metro-Goldwyn-Mayer and broadcast by the ABC network during the 1955–56 season on Wednesdays at 8:30pm (E.S.T.), under the alternate sponsorship of American Tobacco (Pall Mall), and General Foods (Instant Maxwell House).

The 30 minute MGM Parade, one of MGM's first TV programs, was produced by MGM's trailer department as one of the compilation and promotional shows that imitated Walt Disney's Disneyland.

== Background ==
Metro-Goldwyn-Mayer first used television for promotional purposes having a tie in with The Ed Sullivan Show (on CBS) in the early 1950s. The Sullivan Show, however, switched to 20th Century Fox in the mid-1950s, so MGM attempted to have a promotional agreement with NBC, but could not come to terms on the specifics. Instead, MGM's trailer department produced what became MGM's first television series, which was called the MGM Parade. Within three years after its cancellation, the company then launched what became MGM Television.

== History ==
The MGM Parade premiered on ABC in the fall of 1955. Hosted by George Murphy (September 14, 1955 – March 7, 1956), Walter Pidgeon (March 14–May 2, 1956) and other MGM stars, the series went into the MGM vaults to offer segments extracted from such past productions as Good News (1947) and The Pirate (1948); in December, a condensed edition of the 1938 version of A Christmas Carol was presented for the first time on television. Exploring the inner workings of the MGM studios, it featured interviews with prominent MGM stars to promote current and upcoming releases. The program also presented "selected short subjects" from the studio's library (Carey Wilson's Miniatures, John Nesbitt's Passing Parade, Pete Smith's Specialties, Tex Avery's cartoons, Robert Benchley, etc).

After Walter Pidgeon became the host, the format was slightly altered to include edited multi-part versions of "classic" MGM feature films, including Captains Courageous and The Pirate, as well as a tribute and biography of Greta Garbo.

An example of its use as a promotional tool can be seen in the 2008 DVD release of the 1955 musical film Kismet, which includes two episodes of MGM Parade in which actors from the film are interviewed, along with excerpts from the film plus behind-the-scenes footage.

Episodes of the series sporadically air between features on the Turner Classic Movies network in the United States.
