= Television pilot =

Trial episode made to sell a television series

A television pilot (also known as a pilot or a pilot episode and sometimes marketed as a tele-movie) in United Kingdom, Ireland and United States television, is a standalone episode of a television series that is used to sell a show to a television broadcaster or other distributor. A pilot is created to be a testing ground to gauge whether a series will be successful. Television networks use pilots to determine whether an entertaining concept can be successfully realized and whether the expense of additional episodes is justified, much like pilot experiments serve as precursors for choosing which full-scale research projects will move forward with an investment of time and money. Variety estimates that, across the big four American networks alone, roughly 100 pilots will be reviewed by network executives each year, with only a little over a quarter proceeding to the series stage, with the remainder never being seen by a viewing audience.

Once a pilot has been successful in getting a show ordered to series, the pilot itself might be used as the series premiere, or as a later episode, or may never be used at all in the series run. Some series are commissioned straight-to-series without a pilot (although an increasing number of such series have their first episodes titled "Pilot"). On some occasions, pilots that were not ordered to series may also be broadcast as a standalone television film or special.

A backdoor pilot is a telefilm that serves as a proof of concept for a full series, but can be broadcast as a standalone film on its own even if the full series is not picked up.

There have also been cases where feature films shown in cinemas like M*A*S*H, The Cowboys and Logan's Run inadvertently became "pilots" which inspired later television series.

== Pilot season ==
Each summer, the major American broadcast television networks – including ABC, CBS, NBC, Fox, The CW, Univision, and Telemundo – receive about 500 brief elevator pitches each for new shows from writers and producers. Few of these pitches move beyond that point; in the long lead-up to the 2010–11 season, each network requested scripts for about 70 pitches and, months later, ordered about 20 pilot episodes. Actors come to Los Angeles from within the area or elsewhere in the United States and around the world to audition for them. By spring, actors are cast and production crews assembled to produce the pilots.

Casting is a long, competitive process. For the 1994 pilot of Friends, casting director Ellie Kanner reviewed more than 1,000 actors' head shots for each of the six main roles. She only called back 75 to audition again for the show's creators. Of this group, the creators chose some to audition again for Warner Bros. Television executives, who chose the final group of a few actors to audition for NBC executives; as they decide whether to purchase a pilot, network executives generally have ultimate authority over casting. Since the networks work on the same shared schedule, directors, actors and others must choose the best pilot to work for with the hopes that the network will choose it. If it is not chosen, they have wasted their time and money and may have missed out on better career opportunities.

Once they have been produced, the pilots are presented to studio and network executives, and in some cases to test audiences; at this point, each pilot receives various degrees of feedback and is gauged on its potential to advance from one pilot to a full-fledged series. Using this feedback, and factoring in the current status and future potential of their existing series, each network chooses about four to eight pilots for series status. The new series are then presented at the networks' annual upfronts in May, where they are added to network schedules for the following season (either for a fall or "mid-season" winter debut), and at the upfront presentation, the shows are shown to potential advertisers and the networks sell the majority of the advertising for their new pilots. The survival odds for these new series are low, as typically only one or two of them survive for more than one season.

== Types of pilots ==
=== Premise pilot ===
A premise pilot introduces the characters and their world to the viewer; it is structured so that it can be run as the first episode of the series if substantial changes are not made between the pilot and greenlighting. In the event the changes being made are so substantial that they would cause confusion to viewers, the pilot (or portions of it) is often re-shot, recast, or rewritten to fit the rest of the series.

The pilot for Gilligan's Island, for instance, showed the castaways when they had just become stranded on the island, but three roles were recast before going to series, with the characters either modified or completely altered to the point where the pilot could no longer be used as a regular episode. As a result, CBS aired Gilligan's second produced episode, which opened with the same scene of the characters just stranded on the island (showing only those not re-cast); the story from the pilot from that point onward was largely reworked into a flashback episode which aired later (with several key scenes re-shot). Even Gilligan's theme song, which was originally done as a calypso number, was rewritten and recomposed to be completely different.

Another example is Star Trek, where footage from the unaired original pilot, "The Cage", was incorporated into the two-part episode, "The Menagerie", with the story justification that it depicts events that happened several years earlier. Conversely, the second pilot for Star Trek, "Where No Man Has Gone Before", aired as the third episode of the show's first season, even though it included some casting and costuming differences that set it apart from the preceding episodes.

If a network orders a two-hour pilot, it will usually broadcast it as a television film to recoup some of its costs even if the network chooses to not order the show. Sometimes, a made-for-TV-movie is filmed as a pilot, but because of actors not being available, the series intro is reshot for the first aired episode. The original Cagney & Lacey film co-starred Loretta Swit (of M*A*S*H fame) as Chris Cagney, but when she could not get out of her contract, they reshot it with Meg Foster, who after the first season was replaced with Sharon Gless; therefore, the original movie is not considered part of the television series, and is not included in the series collections on DVD. In some cases, this does not hamper broadcast, such as Jackie Cooper playing the role of Walter Carlson in the TV movie pilot of the 1975 series The Invisible Man, but being replaced by Craig Stevens for the remainder of the series; the pilot is still considered part of the series and released to DVD as such. Likewise, The Homecoming: A Christmas Story had an almost entirely different cast from the series it was intended to pilot (The Waltons), but both have been rerun for many years.

=== Proof of concept ===
A proof of concept pilot usually takes place chronologically further into a series run than a premise pilot, to give network executives a better feel for how a typical episode would appear (since a premise pilot may have to deviate from a typical episode in order to properly introduce characters). Remington Steele used both a proof of concept and a premise pilot. Proofs of concept were particularly common for game shows; in such cases, the pilot may be entirely or partially scripted (and thus, due to regulations passed after the 1950s quiz show scandals, illegal to broadcast in many jurisdictions) and use fake contestants and "returning champions" to demonstrate those concepts. The adventure series Lassie had both a premise pilot, "The Inheritance", designed specifically to air as the series' first episode, showing how Lassie's series owner, Jeff Miller, came to acquire her; and a proof of concept pilot, "The Well", showcased situations typical to the series, which aired well on into the first season of the series.

=== Backdoor pilot ===
A backdoor pilot is a telefilm or miniseries that serves as a proof of concept for a full series, but may be broadcast on its own even if the full series is not picked up.

=== Put pilot ===
A put pilot is a pilot that the network has agreed to broadcast either as a special or series; if it does not, it will have to pay substantial monetary penalties to the studio. This usually guarantees that the pilot will be picked up by the network.

=== Unsold pilot ===
An unsold pilot, or busted pilot, is a produced episode that is never broadcast or made into a television series. Variety estimated that only a little over a quarter of all pilots made for American television proceed to the series stage.

=== Test run ===
Instead of a single pilot episode, an alternative is a test run, a small number of episodes that air as a short-run series with the potential to go into full production if successful. This is particularly common among shows that are intended to be stripped (airing five days a week).

Talk shows occasionally use test runs. Metromedia and its successor Fox Corporation were particularly associated with using test runs for talk shows, with examples including The Wendy Williams Show, The Huckabee Show (a spin-off of Huckabee that aired for six weeks in summer 2010), the final version of The Jerry Lewis Show, and The Kilborn File, an unsuccessful comeback vehicle for Craig Kilborn.

In 2021, Fox Alternative Entertainment utilized a test market approach for its new reality talent competition format The Big Deal, producing a season of the series for Irish broadcaster Virgin Media One with the intent to use it as a pitch for Fox and other broadcasters.

==== 10/90 ====
In a 10/90 production model, a network broadcasts ten episodes of a new television program without ordering a pilot first. If the episodes achieve a predetermined ratings level, the network orders 90 more to bring the total to 100 episodes, immediately enough to rerun the show in syndication. Series that used the 10/90 model include Tyler Perry's House of Payne, Meet the Browns, For Better or Worse, Debmar-Mercury's Anger Management, and Are We There Yet?. Byron Allen's sitcoms followed a similar model, with Mr. Box Office and The First Family airing 26-episode first seasons with the intention of following them up with a full 104-episode order if successful; both series failed to reach the threshold Allen sought, though they remained in limited production (three to four new episodes a year, mixed in with the first season) for a few years afterward.

==== Other examples ====
An earlier variant was the 13-episode pilot run; in the late 1980s and early 1990s, Disney Channel notably gave a 13-episode pilot order to two series it never picked up, but would go on to longer runs on other networks: Good Morning, Miss Bliss (which also had a traditional pilot on NBC and would be revived by that network as Saved by the Bell) and the Canadian drama Hillside (which would move to Nickelodeon, Disney Channel's primary rival, and air as Fifteen).

== As distinguished from the series premiere ==
A successful pilot is often used as the series premiere, the first aired episode of a new show, or it may be aired as a later episode or never aired at all. For the Canadian supernatural drama Lost Girl, the pilot that sold the series to Showcase, "Vexed", was used as the eighth episode of the first series. In the case of Firefly, the original pilot ("Serenity") which was intended to serve as the series premiere was rejected by the network, and a new first episode, "Train Job", was shot specifically for broadcast.

Sometimes, too, viewers will assign the word "pilot" to a work that represented the first appearances of characters and situations later employed by a series – even if the work was not initially intended as a pilot for the series. A good example of this is "Love and the Television Set" (later retitled "Love and the Happy Days" for syndication), an episode of Love, American Style that featured a version of the Cunningham family. It was in fact a failed pilot for the proposed 1972 series New Family in Town, but was recycled as a successful pilot for 1974's Happy Days. Firmly embedded is the notion of it as a Happy Days pilot, that even series actress Erin Moran (who did not appear in the episode) viewed it as such, as well as its creator, Garry Marshall, since Happy Days itself did not have a separate pilot of its own. In a similar situation, the 1962 pilot Howie was resurrected 13 years later to form the basis of The Paul Lynde Show.

The original Star Trek TV series had two pilots, neither of which became the premiere episode when the series was picked up. The first, titled "The Cage", did not sell, but Desilu head Lucille Ball convinced NBC executives to allow shooting of a second pilot, "Where No Man Has Gone Before", which was accepted by the network. "The Cage" was edited and expanded into a two-part story, shown as "The Menagerie". This turned out to be an auspicious decision, because of various challenges which bogged down series production during the first season. The second pilot was also shown during that first season, as the third episode. The only major character to appear in both pilots was Spock.

On other occasions, the pilot is never broadcast on television at all. Viewers of Temple Houston, for example, would likely have considered "The Twisted Rope" its pilot because "The Man from Galveston" was only publicly exhibited in cinemas four months later. Even then, "The Man from Galveston" had an almost entirely different cast, and its main character was renamed to avoid confusion with the then-ongoing series.

Some television series are commissioned "straight to series" where a network orders a season without viewing any produced episodes, hence no episode is considered a pilot. For instance, "Invasion of the Bane", the first episode of The Sarah Jane Adventures, is not a pilot because the BBC had committed to the first season before seeing any filmed content – yet it is routinely referred to as a pilot. The straight-to-series model is usually used when established talent is attached to a series, or it is based on an established property or franchise. Amazing Stories from 1985 is credited as being one of the first series commissioned without a pilot. The model has seen a rise since Netflix popularized it.

== Theatrical release ==
A number of unsold pilots have been reworked into theatrically released feature films, including Lum and Abner Abroad (1956), which wove together three pilot episodes for a 1956 series that would have starred the comedy duo of Lum and Abner; Agent for H.A.R.M. (1966); and Mulholland Drive (2001), which was composed of an unsold pilot episode appended with an ending shot specifically for the film. The 1966 film release, Tarzan and the Trappers was edited from the unbroadcast pilot of a proposed 1958 Tarzan series.

In addition, a number of unsuccessful pilot episodes have been released as direct-to-video films, including Belle's Magical World (1998), Cruel Intentions 2 (2001) and Atlantis: Milo's Return (2003).

On a few occasions, pilots have been released as a theatrical films prior to the debuts of their respective series. Examples include Battlestar Galactica, whose pilot was theatrically released during the summer of 1978, prior to its broadcast as the opening episodes of the TV series that fall, and 1979's Buck Rogers in the 25th Century, released in early 1979, with the series launching in the fall. In both cases there are substantial differences between theatrical and televised version: both BSG and Buck Rogers' theatrical pilots had recurring characters (Baltar and Tiger Man, respectively) killed off, the BSG pilot was extended for television, and the televised version of the Buck Rogers pilot utilized a different opening credits sequence and featured a newly added epilogue scene intended to lead into the weekly series.

== Use in anthology series ==
By the mid-1950s, the practice of television executives of ordering dozens of pilots for proposed television series each year — far more than their networks could possibly broadcast as series — had created a sizable body of unsold pilots that had never aired. By 1954, the American television industry had begun to consider the idea of packaging these unsold pilots in anthology series and airing them during the summer, providing television networks with a way of both providing fresh programming during the summer rerun season and recouping at least some of the expense of producing them.

On June 8, 1956, The New York Times reported that the American Broadcasting Company (ABC) would begin airing a package of unsold pilots that summer under the title G.E. Summer Originals, adding that "the problem of what to do with 'pilot' or sample films of projected television series that previously have failed to sell has been solved". G.E. Summer Originals premiered on the evening of July 3, 1956, at exactly the same time as another anthology series of unsold pilots, Sneak Preview on NBC, and these thus became the first two series of unsold pilots to air in the United States.

A number of summer anthology series consisting entirely or partly of unsold pilots were broadcast in the United States between 1956 and 1989. These series were:

- G.E. Summer Originals (ABC, 1956)
- Sneak Preview (NBC, 1956)
- Colgate Theatre (NBC, 1958)
- Decision (NBC, 1958)
- New Comedy Showcase (CBS, 1960)
- The Comedy Spot (CBS, 1960 and 1962)
- Westinghouse Preview Theatre (CBS, 1961)
- Vacation Playhouse (CBS, 1963–1967)
- Summer Playhouse (CBS, 1964–1965)
- Preview Tonight (ABC, 1966)
- Summer Fun (ABC, 1966)
- Premiere (CBS, 1968)
- Comedy Playhouse (CBS, 1971)
- Just for Laughs (ABC, 1974)
- Comedy Theatre (NBC, 1976 and 1979)
- Comedy Time (NBC, 1977)
- Comedy Theater (NBC, 1981)
- CBS Summer Playhouse (CBS, 1987–1989)

By the mid-1980s, the rise of cable television outlets had led to an increase of original programming during the summer months and ABC, CBS, and NBC began to experience a decline in summer viewership; the launch of Fox as a fourth major network in 1987 only exacerbated the problem for the former "Big Three" networks. Although CBS viewed CBS Summer Playouse — broadcast during the summers of 1987, 1988, and 1989 — as original programming that addressed this issue, it was the last anthology series of unsold pilots. Unsold pilots aired as one-offs occasionally during the 1990s, but then the practice of broadcasting them ended almost entirely.

== See also ==
- Series premiere
- Season premiere
- Series finale
- Season finale
