= Can Do =

American TV game series (1956)

- Genre: Game show
- Developed by: Elroy Schwartz
- Presented by: Robert Alda
- Country of origin: United States

Production
- Producer: Joe Cates

Original release
- Network: NBC
- Release: November 21 – December 21, 1956

Can Do is an American television game show that was broadcast on NBC from November 21, 1956, until December 31, 1956.

== Format ==
Each contestant had to guess whether a celebrity could perform a specific stunt successfully after hearing statistics from the American Standard Testing Bureau about what percentage of people had successfully completed the stunt during tests. Housed in an isolation booth, the contestant pressed a button to indicate his or her decision. A correct guess in the first round earned $1,500 for the contestant. The person then had to choose whether to leave with what he or she had earned. Continuing meant doubling the earnings with a correct guess, but if the guess was wrong, he or she received approximately 20 percent of his or her winnings. Each successive round offered the same option, with a maximum prize of $50,000.

Robert Alda was the master of ceremonies. Guest celebrities included Martha Raye, Gypsy Rose Lee, Rocky Graziano, Polly Bergen, Rory Calhoun and Sal Mineo. Stunts included pulling a tablecloth from under dishes, shooting at moving targets with table-tennis balls, and hitting balloons with beanbags.

== Production ==
Can Do was broadcast on Mondays from 9 to 9:30 p.m. Eastern Time, replacing Medic. Its competition included I Love Lucy. Revlon was the sponsor. Joe Cates was the producer. He and Elroy Schwartz developed the program. Revlon originally planned to have another new program, Most Beautiful Girl in the World, in the time slot, but three postponements caused the company to change plans.

Can Do's cancellation was under way two weeks after it debuted. Val Adams wrote in The New York Times, "The failure of Can Do to stimulate new interest in Monday-evening viewing has proved a disappointment to Revlon and N. B. C." It was replaced by Twenty-One.

== Critical response ==
Jack Fitzgerald wrote in the Hartford Courant that Can Do did not seem to be a strong program, but it was likely to attract "that large number of viewers that watches any program which doles out big sums of money to contestants." He described Alda as "personable" but "appearing somewhat nervous on the first program". In summary, Fitzgerald said the program "is 30 minutes of clowning and fun, but not a whole lot more."
