= Combat Sergeant =

American TV military series (1956)

- Genre: War drama
- Starring: Michael Thomas; Cliff Clark; Mara Corday; Dominick Delgarde; Frank Marlowe; Bill Slack
- Country of origin: United States
- Original language: English
- No. of seasons: 1
- No. of episodes: 13

Production
- Running time: 30 minutes
- Production company: National Telefilm Associates

Original release
- Network: Syndication
- Release: June 29 – September 27, 1956

Combat Sergeant is an American television program that originally aired on ABC from June 29, 1956, to September 27, 1956.

== Premise ==
The series was set in Africa during World War II. Actual footage of the war was spliced into episodes. Sergeant Nelson's orders, which came from General Harrison, led him into spying on Germans, coordination of efforts of various Allied military forces, and other activities. Romance sometimes resulted.

== Characters and cast ==
- Sergeant Nelson - Michael Thomas
- General Harrison - Cliff Clark
- Abdulla - Dominick Delgarde
- Lieutenant Kruger - Bill Slack
- WAC Corporal Harbin - Mara Corday

== Production and syndication ==
Jack H. Skirball was the producer of Combat Sergeant and George Blair was the director. The writers were DeVallon Scott and Julian Harmon. The show was initially broadcast on Fridays from 8 to 8:30 p.m. Eastern Time. In September 1956 it was moved to Thursdays from 9 to 9:30 p.m. E. T. Thirteen episodes were filmed by Universal-International.

Combat Sergeant was produced by National Telefilm Associates, and had originally been intended as a first-run syndicated program; it was offered to individual television stations in March 1956, but saw no sales. The series was offered to ABC, which purchased the program. After a brief summer run on ABC in 1956, the series was rerun on the syndicated NTA Film Network starting in summer 1957.

== Critical response ==
The trade publication Broadcasting called Combat Sergeant the "purest form" of "the classic TV formula" of good versus bad, as the U. S. Army took on Nazis and their associates. The review noted how Thomas "heroically portrayed" Nelson and concluded, "If another pure-and-simple, rough-and-tumble, ride-and-fight series is what TV needed, this is it."

A review of the episode "Flight Into Eternity" in the trade publication Variety said that it began "as a semi-documentary" but soon had its hero "in and out of more unlikely anti-climactic scrapes than Man Called X, Range Rider, and Hotshot Charlie together." It said "Thomas is a fresh-faced kid who performa adequately, and the rest look like soldiers should."

The trade publication Motion Picture Daily called the premiere episode "a lively, action-laden and authentic appearing story." It said that the episode achieved "a rather high degree of suspense and action" and concluded by calling the show "a good series, well produced, smartly directed."
