= The Golden Touch of Frankie Carle =

American TV musical variety series (1956)

The Golden Touch of Frankie Carle is a 15-minute musical variety television series broadcast in the United States by NBC from August 7, 1956, through October 29, 1956.

The Golden Touch of Frankie Carle featured pianist Frankie Carle and guest singers performing a variety of music, including popular standards and the current hits of the day. Accompaniment was provided by a musical trio.

The program's main purpose was to round out the half-hour prior to the beginning of prime time. It preceded the network's evening news broadcasts, which were, like most network news broadcasts of the era, only 15 minutes long.

Carle's guest on the premiere episode was Joanne Gilbert.

== Production ==
Jim Jordan Jr. produced and directed the series. The writers were Lenny Gaines and Barry Ziff. The show was sustaining and originated from KRCA-TV.

In August 1956 the program was broadcast on Tuesdays from 7:30 to 7:45 p.m. Eastern Time. In September it added Mondays at that same time. In October it cut back to only Mondays, still in the 7:30 time slot. It was replaced by The Nat King Cole Show.

== Critical response ==
A review in the trade publication Broadcasting said that the premiere episode focused too little on the star: "Mr. Carle was all but crowded off the screen" by "visual gimmicks", the guest "gets far more exposure than he does", and "Mr. Carle is permitted to play only snatches of the songs that made him famous."
