= Chance of a Lifetime (TV series) =

- Presented by: Dennis James (ABC); John Reed King (DuMont)
- Country of origin: United States

Production
- Running time: ~25 minutes

Original release
- Network: ABC (1952–1953 and 1955–1956); DuMont (1953–1955)
- Release: 1952 – June 23, 1956

Chance of a Lifetime is an American television competitive talent show that began on ABC on September 6, 1950, and aired on ABC and DuMont between 1952 and 1956.

== Format ==
Three professional performers, usually singers, dancers or instrumentalists, competed. In the early version of the show, there were four contestants with the winner chosen by votes tallied by attendants in the audience.

In the later version, the winner of the first half, determined by an audience applause meter, then competed against a returning champion in the second half. After both champion and challenger, in that order, have performed, the audience applause meter determines the champion, who receives $1000 cash, the opportunity to return the following week, and a week's engagement at a popular nightspot.

== Broadcast history ==
John Reed King was the host of the 1950 version of the show, which debuted on ABC on September 20, 1950. Dennis James replaced King in 1952, and that version ended on August 20, 1953. King returned to host the DuMont version, which ran from September 11, 1953, to June 17, 1955. The show moved to ABC on July 3, 1955, with Dennis James as host. It ran until June 23, 1956. In 1954, comedian Jonathan Winters made his TV debut on the DuMont version of the show. Also in 1954, Diahann Carroll appeared on the show as a contestant three weeks in a row.

== Production ==
The 1950 version of the program originated at WJZ-TV, with Bendix as the sponsor. Robert G. Jennings was the producer, and Charles Harrell was the director.

== Episode status ==
One episode of the DuMont version is held in the J. Fred MacDonald collection at the Library of Congress. Another episode, from the ABC run, is linked below.

Fifteen episodes are held by the UCLA Film and Television Archive. These include two episodes from 1951, eight from 1953, two from 1954, and three from 1955.

== See also ==
- List of programs broadcast by the DuMont Television Network
- List of surviving DuMont Television Network broadcasts

== Bibliography ==
- David Weinstein, The Forgotten Network: DuMont and the Birth of American Television (Philadelphia: Temple University Press, 2004) ISBN 1-59213-245-6
- Alex McNeil, Total Television, Fourth edition (New York: Penguin Books, 1980) ISBN 0-14-024916-8
- Tim Brooks and Earle Marsh, The Complete Directory to Prime Time Network and Cable TV Shows 1946–Present, Ninth edition (New York: Ballantine Books, 2007) ISBN 978-0-345-49773-4
