= Warner Bros. Presents =

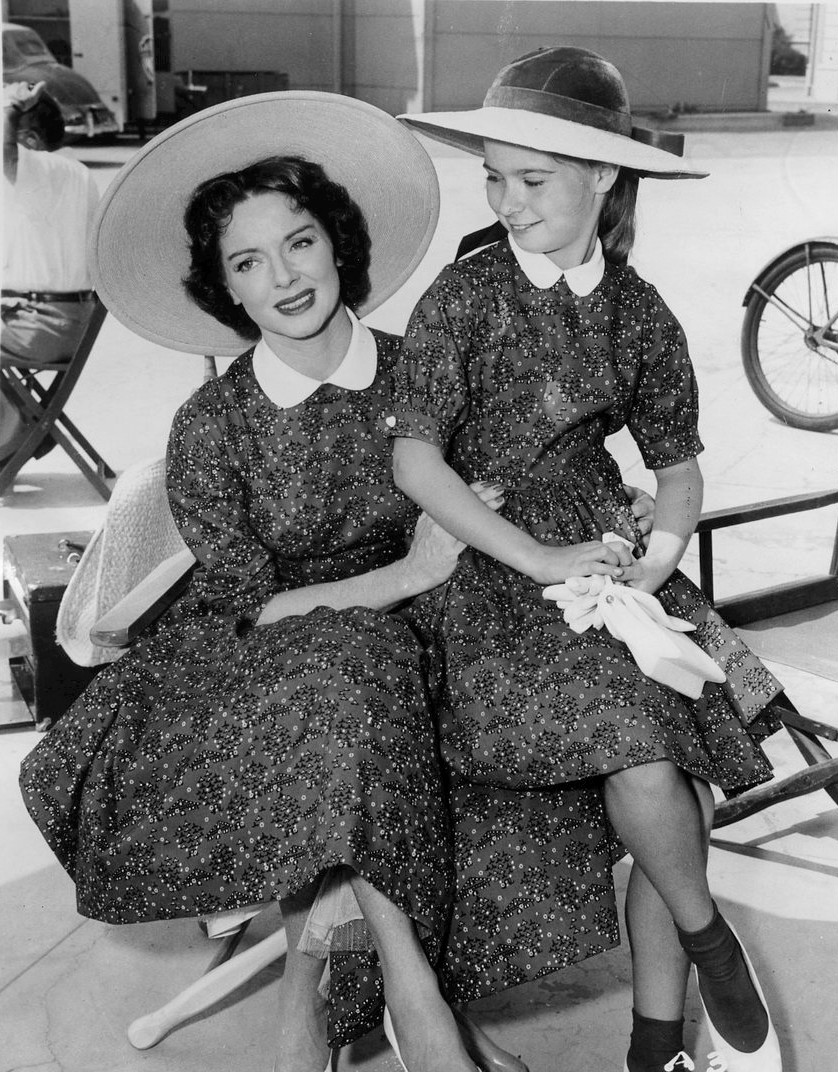
- Arleen Whelan and Lydia Reid in "Shadow on the Sand", 1955
- Genre: Wheel series Anthology; Documentary
- Presented by: Gig Young
- Theme music composer: Opening fanfare by Ray Heindorf main theme, "Dominque's Theme" from The Fountainhead, by Max Steiner
- Country of origin: United States
- Original language: English
- No. of seasons: 1
- No. of episodes: 36

Production
- Executive producer: William T. Orr
- Producer: Roy Huggins
- Camera setup: Single-camera
- Running time: 45–48 minutes
- Production company: Warner Bros. Television

Original release
- Network: ABC
- Release: September 20, 1955 – May 22, 1956

Related
- Conflict; Cheyenne

Warner Bros. Presents is the umbrella title for three series that were telecast as part of the 1955–56 season on ABC: Cheyenne, a new Western series that originated on Presents, and two based on classic Warner Bros motion picture properties, becoming Casablanca and Kings Row. The series ran from September 13, 1955, until September 4, 1956, or September 11, 1956.

While neither a critical nor popular success, this wheel series is an historically important program. Perhaps most significantly, it is the first television program of any kind made by Warner Bros. It was also the original home of Cheyenne, the first hour-long television Western series and the first wholly original television series produced by a major Hollywood studio. It also allowed ABC, then a junior player in American television, to secure its first advertising contracts with commercial giants General Electric and tobacco company Liggett & Myers.

== Historical background ==
At first, Warner Bros., like most other Hollywood studios, had seen television as a threat that it wished would disappear. Jack L. Warner, stung by the failure of Milton Berle's expensive film Always Leave Them Laughing, tried to dismiss it as a mere passing fad, but by 1955, this apparently was hardly the case. ABC, which did not have the contracts with stars and their hit former radio shows on the CBS and NBC networks, approached Warner Bros. about acquiring the rights to broadcast some of its relatively recent theatrical films, which were then not available for television broadcast. Instead, Warner saw a different potential for his company, inspired by ABC's Disneyland. He believed that perhaps television could be used to cross-market upcoming Warner Bros. films. Thus, he created a television department and promoted his son-in-law, William T. Orr, to the new position of Head of Television Production. The initial goal was to provide new short fiction which they could wrap around segments hosted by actor Gig Young, giving information about upcoming Warner's film projects. Orr's first effort in that capacity was this program.

== Program evolution ==
Originally, the hour-long episodes consisted of only about 45 minutes of dramatic programming, followed by a 10- to 15-minute "Behind the Camera" section. During this portion of the program, viewers saw James Dean doing rope tricks on the set of Giant, Billy Wilder and James Stewart explaining the special effects of The Spirit of St. Louis, and other notable Warner Bros. productions, including a four-part feature on the new John Ford Western The Searchers, one of the first attempts to document the making of a major Hollywood film and a similar three-part feature on the making of Helen of Troy.

While completing Giant, and to promote Rebel Without a Cause, Dean filmed a short interview with Gig Young for an episode of Warner Bros. Presents in which Dean, instead of saying the popular phrase "The life you save may be your own", ad-libbed "The life you might save might be mine." Dean's sudden death prompted the studio to refilm the section, and the piece was never aired.

The problem for ABC's newly acquired advertisers was that it amounted to a 15-minute commercial for Warner Bros.' products. They had ABC exert pressure to abolish the segment before the season concluded.

The concept changed in other ways as the season progressed. The dramatic portions of the program were attacked from the beginning as inept. All three series were overhauled, but only Cheyenne emerged as successful. It would have ranked in the top 20 if its ratings had been calculated independently. Despite the relative success of Cheyenne, ABC and Warner Bros. continued to have problems injecting Kings Row and Casablanca with sufficient drama. These efforts failed. Kings Row, starring Jack Kelly and Robert Horton in the roles played by Robert Cummings and Ronald Reagan in the original film, was axed within just a few weeks of its first broadcast, while Casablanca, starring Charles McGraw in the Bogart part, survived almost to the end of the season. However, when they both went, the umbrella of Warner Bros. Presents effectively closed, pushing Cheyenne out on its own. Presents was renamed Conflict by ABC and relaunched as an anthology series. Around this time, the films which inspired the Kings Row and Casablanca segments were sold, along with the rest of WB's pre-1950 theatrical library, to Associated Artists Productions. (Note: WB retained a pair of features from 1949 that they merely distributed, and all short subjects released on or after September 1, 1948; in addition to all cartoons released in August 1948.)

== Aftermath ==
Conflict finished the remainder of the 1955 season and continued on into 1956, but it, too, ultimately failed. By 1957, the only element remaining from the 1955 season was Cheyenne. Nevertheless, Presents may be regarded as a forerunner of an entirely new era of television —- one in which big Hollywood studios actively made original, episodic television. It also began a long-running partnership between Warner Bros. and ABC. Over the course of the following decade, the two companies provided American viewers with a string of popular programs. The relationship pulled ABC from the bottom of the ratings and helped it avoid the fate of the other struggling 1950s broadcaster, the DuMont Network.
