= High Finance (game show) =

- Genre: Game show
- Starring: Dennis James (host)
- Country of origin: United States
- Original language: English
- No. of seasons: 1
- No. of episodes: 24

Production
- Camera setup: Multi-camera
- Running time: 30 minutes

Original release
- Network: CBS
- Release: July 7 – December 15, 1956

High Finance is a quiz show created and hosted by Dennis James which aired on CBS from July 7 to December 15, 1956. It followed Gunsmoke on the CBS schedule. High Finance aired at 10:30 p.m. Saturdays opposite NBC's Your Hit Parade.

== Premise ==
On the program, contestants answered questions about current events. The player would be asked five questions based on three newspapers which he or she studied before the show. Each correct answer earned $300. Three correct answers allowed the player to play the "investment segment" in which he or she wagered any amount of the money won on answering a question. A correct answer won the wager and a prize, plus the option to risk any prizes won and return the next week to play another "investment segment" or keep any prizes won and leave the show. A fourth win would earn that player his or her "dream prize", such as a miniature golf course or a restaurant. A fifth successful "investment segment" won that player an additional $75,000.

Contestants on High Finance included boxer Joe Louis and his wife, who sought to win money to pay part of the more than $1 million that Louis owed the Internal Revenue Service in back taxes. They won $41,000 as they appeared as special guests for eight weeks.

== Production ==
Robert Jennings and James created High Finance. Peter Arnell was the producer; Lou Sposa was the associate producer and director. The program originated live from WCBS-TV, replacing Damon Runyon Theater. Monsanto and Mennen were the sponsors. Mennen sponsored two episodes per month, and Monsanto had one. During each fourth week Ford Star Jubilee pre-empted High Finance. Mennen's sponsorship ended when the show completed its second cycle. The trade publication Billboard said that Mennen was "reportedly unhappy" with the program's summer ratings, which included 11.1 for August. Ratings remained a problem in the fall, diminishing as time went on, when "They should have gone higher to keep even with the sharp general viewing upswing from September to November. At the beginning of the Fall 1957 season, CBS relinquished the 10:30 p.m. Saturday time slot to affiliates.
