= It's Polka Time =

American musical TV series (1956–1957)

- Genre: Music
- Country of origin: United States
- Original language: English

Production
- Running time: 30 minutes

Original release
- Network: ABC
- Release: July 13, 1956 – September 24, 1957

It's Polka Time is an American musical television series broadcast by ABC from July 13, 1956, to September 24, 1957.

Also known as simply Polka Time, the program featured authentic polka music, performed in Chicago, Illinois, primarily by authentic Polish-Americans. Chief among the regular performers seen were:

- Bruno "Junior" Zielinski
- Carolyn DeZuirk
- Richard (Hodyl) and Mildred (Lawnik)
- Wally Moore and Chick Hurt
- Irene Grodzki (formally Gorecki)
- Rusty Gill
- The Polka Chips
- Kanal Siodmy Dancers

It’s Polka Time, hosted by Stan Wolowic and the Polka Chips, began in the summer of 1956. The band included in addition to Stan Wolowic on accordion, Wally Moore, banjo, Tommy Thomas, drums, Jack Cordaro, clarinet, Chick Hurt, Banjo, Jack Taylor Bass. Rusty Gill was featured on vocals and guitar, his wife Carolyn DeZurik was also featured on vocals and yodeling. Most of them were in a group called the Kentucky Ramblers. This group moved to Chicago in the 1930s and joined the WLS staff and became the Prairie Ramblers, before becoming the “Chips”. They claim that Wally Moore wrote lyrics for all of the Polka Chips songs. The Show was on from July 1956 to September 1957. It was produced at WBKB's 190 North State St. studios and broadcast locally over WBKB Channel 7 and nationally over the ABC Network.

The program was initially broadcast on Sundays from 8:30 to 9 p.m. Eastern Time. Beginning on October 30, 1956, it was moved to Tuesdays from 10 to 10:30 p.m. E. T.
