= Casablanca (1955 TV series) =

American spy drama series

- Also known as: Warner Bros. Presents
- Genre: Cold War spy/intrigue
- Starring: Charles McGraw; Marcel Dalio; Dan Seymour
- Country of origin: United States
- Original language: English
- No. of seasons: 1
- No. of episodes: 10

Production
- Executive producer: William T. Orr
- Producer: Roy Huggins
- Production location: California
- Running time: 60 mins.
- Production company: Warner Bros. Television

Original release
- Network: ABC
- Release: September 27, 1955 – April 24, 1956

Casablanca is an hour-long American television series, in the genre of spying and intrigue during the Cold War, which was broadcast on ABC between September 27, 1955 and April 24, 1956 as part of the wheel series Warner Bros. Presents. The third of 20 filmed shows produced for ABC, between 1955 and 1963, by Warner Bros. Television, under the supervision of executive producer William T. Orr, Casablanca is also the only one among those shows to be structured in the form of a non-U.S.-based Cold-War-intrigue storyline, while 14 of the 20 productions were western and detective/adventure series.

== Series elements ==
The series was based on Everybody Comes to Rick's, a play written in 1940 by American authors Murray Burnett and Joan Alison, and the celebrated 1942 film version, Casablanca starring Humphrey Bogart, Ingrid Bergman and Peter Lorre.

The television series stars Charles McGraw as Rick Blaine, the character played in the film by Bogart. After the 7-episode Kings Row, it was the second-least-successful among Orr's twenty ABC series, canceled after the production of only ten episodes. Director John Peyser has attributed the failure to studio head Jack L. Warner's refusal to finalize the hiring of charismatic rising star Anthony Quinn to play Rick and settling instead on McGraw, an actor Peyser said "couldn't act his way out of a hat".

Although the standard length for episodes of hour-long filmed series was 53 or 54 minutes, the first 23 episodes of Warner Bros. Presents, including 8 of the 10 installments of Casablanca, were timed to run 48 minutes, thus enabling Warner Bros Television to append 6-minute segments, hosted by Gig Young, promoting upcoming Warners films and chatting with stars under contract to the studio.

== Background for the creation of the series ==
Buying the rights to the unpublished and unstaged play by Burnett and Allison in January 1942, Warners had, at various intervals, assigned its adaptation to scenarists Julius and Philip Epstein, Howard Koch and the uncredited Casey Robinson, while also putting at the helm one of their top directors, Michael Curtiz. Production began on May 25, with final shooting concluded on August 3. Casablanca's New York City premiere was rushed to take place in November, thus taking advantage of the newspaper headlines announcing Allied capture of North African ports, including Casablanca. Because of the November release, the New York Film Critics included the film in its 1942 award season for best picture (the ultimate winner turned out to be the British wartime naval saga, In Which We Serve), but the Academy of Motion Picture Arts and Sciences insisted that since Casablanca was not released nationally until early 1943, it would compete at the Award ceremony taking place in 1944. Sixteen months after its New York premiere, Casablanca won Best Picture, Best Director and Best Adapted Screenplay for Julius J. Epstein, Philip G. Epstein and Howard Koch. There were five additional nominations: Best Actor (Humphrey Bogart), Best Supporting Actor (Claude Rains), Best Cinematography, Black-and White (Arthur Edeson), Best Film Editing (Owen Marks) and Best Music, Scoring of a Dramatic or Comedy Picture (Max Steiner).

More than a decade later, Warner Bros Television chose its Best Picture nominees for 1943, Casablanca (in addition to the winner, Warners had a second nominee, Watch on the Rhine), and 1942, Kings Row (the studio had one other nominee, Yankee Doodle Dandy), as television's initial two series to be directly derived from theatrical films. King's Row starred Jack Kelly in Robert Cummings' role in the theatrical film and Robert Horton playing Ronald Reagan's part; Kelly and Horton later played leading roles in the television series Maverick and Wagon Train respectively for five seasons beginning two years later in 1957. The third rotating element of Warner Brothers Presents, Cheyenne, the first of seven westerns produced for ABC, was a non-directly-derivative concept (Warners 1947 western, Cheyenne has no connection to the series) which also made history as TV's first hour-long western and also the first western series made for adults, rather than children, who had been watching such half-hour series as The Lone Ranger and The Cisco Kid since the earliest years of full-schedule TV programming. Analogous to the abbreviated time allotted for 8 of Casablanca's 10 installments, the 48-minute episode length was also applicable to 8 of Cheyenne's 15 installments and all 7 installments of Kings Row.

== Casablanca, the series ==
One of the most iconic films in Hollywood history, Casablanca perfectly caught the present-day (1942) wartime spirit of the age, but the TV series set, as it was, during the latter-day (1955) present of the Cold War, with its spies and intrigue, could not compete. Its stories were molded into the style of standard TV drama of the era, omitting any mention of themes which would have been considered inappropriate for an early-evening audience.

== Series characters in 1955 and in the 1983 revival ==
The three top-billed roles in the 1942 film are played by Humphrey Bogart as Rick Blaine, Ingrid Bergman as Ilsa Lund and Paul Henreid as Victor Laszlo. In the series, the last name of Rick, portrayed by Charles McGraw, is Jason, while Ilsa and Victor do not appear as characters. The debut episode, "Who Holds Tomorrow?", showcases single-installment guest star Anita Ekberg playing a version of Ilsa, named Trina, but the storyline's reminiscence of Rick and Trina's past relationship veers into spies, killers and Cold War intrigue.

Billed fourth through seventh in the film's credits are Claude Rains as Captain Louis Renault, Conrad Veidt as Major Strasser, Sydney Greenstreet as Ferrari and Peter Lorre as Ugarte. The TV series retains the French police chief who bears a slightly different surname, Captain Renaud, played by Marcel Dalio (who was unbilled as Emil, Rick's gambling table croupier in 1942). The Nazi major, who had been fatally shot by Rick at the end of the film, was eliminated as a character, but Ferrari, the Fat Man with the powerful connections, was now portrayed by heavily built Dan Seymour (who was unbilled as Abdul the doorman at Rick's in 1942). Like Strasser, Ugarte, who had been reported as killed near the end of the film, is not in the series. Among those further down the film's cast list, S. K. Sakall (credited in a number of his later roles as S. Z. "Cuddles" Sakall) as Carl, Dooley Wilson as Sam and Leonid Kinskey as Sasha are reflected in the series' three supporting regulars — Ludwig Stossel (who had an unbilled part as the refugee Mr. Leuchtag in 1942) portrays the Sakall-styled maître d', Ludwig, Clarence Muse is at the piano as Sam and Michael Fox provides slight comedy relief as Sasha the bartender.

Twenty-seven years after the final first-run episode of Casablanca was broadcast in April 1956, Warner Bros. Television produced another TV series titled Casablanca which premiered on April 10, 1983. The role of Rick, whose surname was returned to its original form, Blaine, was won by David Soul who gained TV stardom as one of the stars of the popular 1975–79 police detective series Starsky & Hutch. His turn as Rick, however, lasted only five episodes.

The setting of the 1983 series returned to the film's period of early World War II, with its action described as taking place over a year earlier than the events depicted in the film. All the personalities depicted in the 1955 series were the same, except for the return of Major Strasser and his aide Lieutenant Heinz. The French police captain's name also returned to its film form, Renault, and the bartender's name was now spelled "Sacha".

== Episodes ==
No.	Title	Directed by	Written by	Original release date
1	"Who Holds Tomorrow?"	John Peyser	David P. Harmon	September 27, 1955
To be determined Guest cast: Anita Ekberg as Trina, Alberto Morin as Portino
2	"Black Market Operation"	Unknown	Unknown	October 18, 1955
To be determined Guest cast: Nicole Maurey as Denise, Peter Van Eyck as Alex Thannis
3	"Labor Camp Escape"	Unknown	Unknown	November 8, 1955
Rick becomes aware of plotting by Soviet spies; the wife (Maureen O'Sullivan) of an American newspaper reporter (William Hopper) captured behind the Iron Curtain is reunited with her husband. In the promotional segment, Gig Young interviews Liberace on the set of his Warners film Sincerely Yours. Guest cast: Maureen O'Sullivan as Helen, William Hopper as William Randoll, Don Randolph as Captain Rudolph
4	"Hand of Fate"	John Peyser	Nelson Gidding	November 29, 1955
Rick attempts to recover an extremely valuable artifact. In the promotional segment, Gig Young interviews Gary Cooper on the set of his Warners film The Court-Martial of Billy Mitchell. Guest cast: Kurt Katch as Ozmajian, David Leonard as Professor Garnier, Harry Nader as Jahmed
5	"Family Dispute"	Unknown	Unknown	December 20, 1955
To be determined In the promotional segment, Gig Young introduces film clips of Al Jolson entertaining soldiers on the sidelines of battlefronts; another segment depicts Mario Lanza performing "Ave Maria". Guest cast: Arleen Whelan, Joe De Santis, Lydia Reed, Patty McCormack
6	"Fateful Night"	John Peyser	S : Robert Libott; T : Nelson Gidding	January 10, 1956
A man who opposed the Vichy government in Casablanca had been betrayed and his father asks for Rick's help in finding who was responsible. In the promotional segment, Gig Young commemorates the 30th anniversary of the John Barrymore vehicle, Don Juan, Warner Bros. first film with recorded sound. Guest cast: Lester Matthews as Colonel Masters, Karin Booth as Sylvia, Jean De Briac as General Dupres, Lisa Daniels as Vicki, Jon Shepodd as Larry, Morris Ankrum as Lou
7	"Satan's Veil"	Alvin Ganzer	S : Eric Ambler; T : Nelson Gidding, Norman Lessing	January 31, 1956
The enticingly named international spy Ghitana Eros uses her beauty and erotic wiles to entrap innocent tourist Allardyce Newton. Guest cast: Elliott Reid as Allardyce Newton, Rossana Rory as Ghitana Eros
8	"The Alley"	Don Weis	Seeleg Lester	February 28, 1956
A man who is fatally stabbed in the alley alongside Rick's place reveals with his last breath that a plan is afoot to assassinate the diplomats gathering that night for a peace conference. Guest cast: Eduard Franz as Ben Hassan, Rena Clark as Rhoda, Corey Allen as Abdel
9	"Siren Song"	Richard L. Bare	Frederick Brady, Seeleg Lester	April 10, 1956
Trying to impress a beautiful international playgirl, retired bullfighter Francisco ignores the advice of his friend Rick and determines that he must return to the ring. Guest cast: Mari Blanchard as Elsa Norden, James Mitchell as Francisco, Roberta Haynes as Maria, Hayden Rorke as Henderson, Ric Roman as Rossano
10	"Deadlock!"	Don Weis	Nelson Gidding	April 24, 1956
To be determined Guest cast: Olive Sturgess as Susette, Peter van Eyck as Chadec, Carl Milletaire as Guillot, Laurie Mitchell as Gaby, Ann Codee as Miss Stohli

== Sources ==
- Anderson, Christopher. Hollywood TV: The Studio System in the Fifties. Austin: University of Texas Press, 1994.
- Balio, Tino, editor. Hollywood in the Age of Television. Boston: Unwin, Hyman, 1990.
- Woolley, Lynn; Malsbary, Robert W. and Strange, Robert G., Jr. Warner Brothers Television: Every Show of the Fifties and Sixties, Episode by Episode. Jefferson, North Carolina: McFarland, 1985.
