= Wanted (1955 TV series) =

American TV documentary series (1955–1956)

- Genre: Documentary
- Directed by: Bruce Anderson
- Narrated by: Walter McGraw
- Country of origin: United States
- Original language: English
- No. of episodes: 20

Production
- Running time: 30 minutes

Original release
- Network: CBS
- Release: October 20, 1955 – January 12, 1956

Wanted is an American documentary television series that was broadcast on CBS from October 20, 1955, through January 12, 1956. It sought to locate fugitives from justice.

== Overview ==
Walter McGraw narrated the series, in which each episode focused on a real-life criminal case (taken from the active-case files of the Federal Bureau of Investigation) from the commission of the crime "through the process of detection". The show used no actors. Informants, police officers, witnesses and other people portrayed themselves as phases of the pursuit of the criminal were re-enacted "clue by clue, witness by witness, hideout by hideout". Those depictions were supplemented with interviews of victims and members of the family of the wanted person in an effort to bring out "the fugitives' background, environment, crime motivations, social relationships and records". Each episode included an appeal for the wanted person to surrender. McGraw said that he wanted the program to counteract "a lot of misunderstanding and glamorizing of crime". He wanted viewers to better understand how people became criminals, how they were usually not happy people and were "seldom the movie gangster type".

In some cases, efficiency of police efforts worked against the program. Production schedules required work on each episode to begin about four weeks before it was to be broadcast. In three cases, police apprehended the subject of an episode before it went on the air. Insurance through Lloyd's of London covered the losses in each case.

The premiere episode focused on Frederick "The Saint" Tenuto. Police sought Tenuto with regard to the murder of a man who had provided information about where Willie Sutton could be found. The December 15, 1955, episode was about James Sheldon Truelove, who had escaped from the state penitentiary in North Carolina, where he was serving a life sentence. About a week later, FBI agents arrested him in Seattle, Washington.

== Production ==
Walter and Peggy McGraw were the producers of Wanted, which was filmed and originated from WCBS-TV. (Although most episodes were entirely on film, some had McGraw narrating live.) Directors included Bruce Anderson. Sponsors included Aerowax, Easy-Off oven cleaner, and Anacin. A staff of almost 70 people worked on the programs with cooperation from police departments in metropolitan areas and sheriffs in rural areas.

CBS originally scheduled Wanted on Thursdays from 8 to 8:30 p.m. Eastern Time as a replacement for Ray Milland's program, but it was broadcast on Thursdays from 10:30 to 11 p.m. E.T., replacing The Halls of Ivy. Its competition included Lux Video Theatre. Production costs were approximately $32,500.

Lakeside Television bought distribution rights for syndication of Wanted in 1956. The deal included all 20 episodes that were made, half of which were not shown on CBS.

== Critical response ==
A review in the trade publication Broadcasting compared Wanted to the radio program Gang Busters and said that it would "more than satisfy" the curiosity of people who wondered what the stories were behind wanted posters that they saw in Post Offices. The review said that the November 3, 1955, episode depicted a murder and subsequent significant scenes with "graphic realism", and it commented, "Wanted is a welcome change from the familiar faces of the tired cop and robber routines."

A brief review in the trade publication Variety commented that McGraw's change to narrating live rather than on film was not an improvement; it said that the presentation was "dull and ponderous". The review called the program "30 minutes of confusing and uninteresting exposition relieved only by the Anacin commercials".

Associated Press writer Charles Mercer called Wanted "The most thoughtful look at crime that has come to television in quite a while". Mercer complimented the show's technique of interviewing criminals' friends and family, and he described video techniques as "penetrating" when the camera "sweeps through slums and stares down grim alleys and peers into the hall bedroom lives that fringe the world of crime."
