= Medical Horizons =

- Genre: Documentary
- Directed by: Fred Carney
- Starring: Don Goddard (host); Quincy Howe
- Country of origin: United States
- Original language: English
- No. of seasons: 1
- No. of episodes: 26

Production
- Producer: Fred Carney
- Camera setup: Multi-camera
- Running time: 30 minutes

Original release
- Network: ABC
- Release: September 12, 1955 – March 5, 1956

Medical Horizons is a public affairs television series, focusing on advancements in medical technology, which aired on ABC from September 12, 1955, to March 5, 1956. The program, broadcast live, sometimes offered surgical scenes as well as information about new medical equipment. Don Goddard was the host after other obligations caused initial host Quincy Howe to leave.

Fred Carney was the producer and Robert "Bob" Foster was the director. Jay Raeben of the J. Walter Thompson agency was the writer. Ciba Pharmaceutical Products, in cooperation with the American Medical Association, sponsored the program. The purpose of the program was to "bring to the attention of the public the contributions of the American health professions" (per "Cibascope," company newsletter, 1956).

Episodes included "Before His Time", which reported on "special measures taken to help premature babies survive the first days of life". It was the first of the series's episodes to be repeated.

The show was broadcast on Mondays from 9:30 to 10 p.m. Eastern Time. It later returned on Sunday afternoons, airing from September 1956 to June 1957.

== Critical reception ==
A review of the November 14, 1955, episode in the trade publication Broadcasting found that broadcast lacking in interest. It began, "The dramatic and increasingly successful fight against tuberculosis managed to become a dull story ..." The review also contained the comment, "Lines intended to reflect spontaneity instead came out as clumsy and plodding ..."`
