= Kings Row (TV series) =

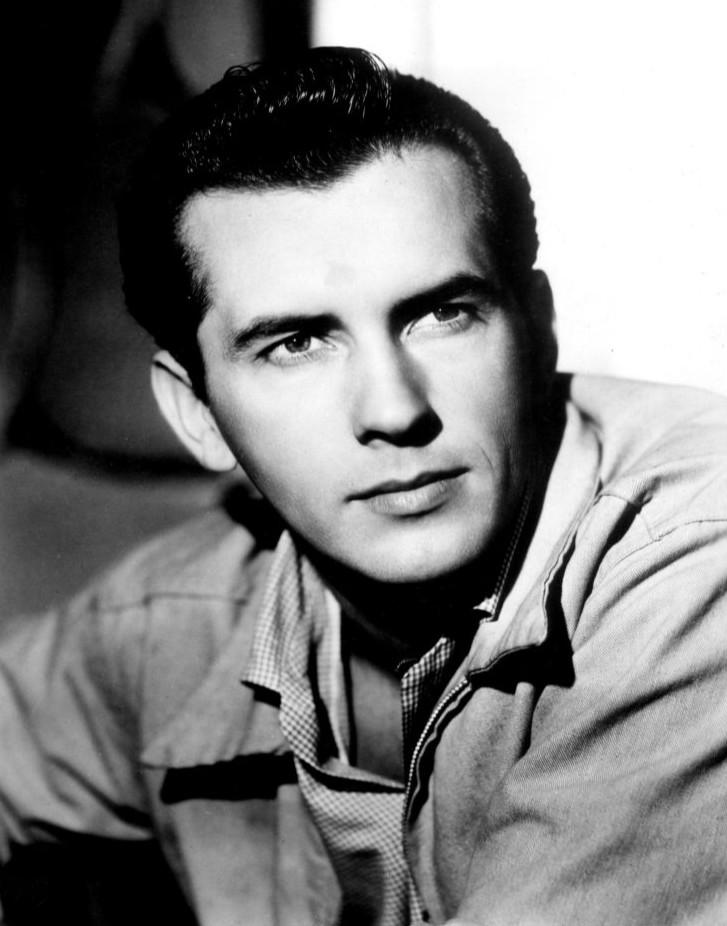
- Series lead Jack Kelly
- Also known as: Warner Bros. Presents
- Genre: Period drama
- Starring: Jack Kelly; Nan Leslie; Robert Horton
- Theme music composer: Max Steiner (end theme)
- Country of origin: United States
- Original language: English
- No. of seasons: 1
- No. of episodes: 7

Production
- Executive producer: William T. Orr
- Producer: Roy Huggins
- Production location: California
- Running time: 60 mins.
- Production company: Warner Bros. Television

Original release
- Network: ABC
- Release: September 13, 1955 – January 17, 1956

Kings Row is an hour-long American television period drama starring Jack Kelly, Nan Leslie and Robert Horton which was broadcast on ABC between September 13, 1955 and January 17, 1956 as part of the wheel series Warner Bros. Presents. It was the first of 20 filmed shows produced for ABC between 1955 and 1963 by Warner Bros Television, under the supervision of executive producer William T. Orr, Kings Row is also the only straight drama among those shows, whereas Westerns and detective/adventure series comprised 14 of the 20 productions.

The series' protagonist is psychiatrist Parris Mitchell, who has recently set up his practice in a small town of the Midwestern United States. He is met with mistrust and prejudice.

== Series elements ==
Based on the 1940 novel by Henry Bellamann and its film version, Kings Row, which was nominated for three Oscars, including Best Picture, at the 15th Academy Awards in March 1943, the TV version starred Jack Kelly, Nan Leslie and Robert Horton, portraying the characters played in the film by Robert Cummings, Ann Sheridan and Ronald Reagan, respectively. It turned out to be the least successful among Orr's twenty ABC series, having been canceled after the production of only seven episodes.

Although the standard length for episodes of hour-long filmed series had subsequently become established at 53 or 54 minutes, the first 23 episodes of Warner Bros. Presents, including all 7 installments of Kings Row, were timed to run 48 minutes, thus enabling Warner Bros Television to run 6-minute segments, hosted by Gig Young, promoting upcoming Warners films and chatting with stars under contract to the studio.

== Background for the creation of the series ==
German-American novelist Henry Bellamann (birth name Heinrich Hauer Bellamann), whose heritage made him a social outcast in the small Missouri city of Fulton where he was born and raised, channeled the bitter memories of his youth into the bestselling novel, Kings Row, copyrighted in 1940 and published in 1941 by Simon and Schuster. The rights to the novel, which chronicles moral decay in a fictional midwestern town at the end of the 19th and the beginning of the 20th century, were immediately purchased by Warner Bros., which put the film version into production between August and October 1941, with the New York City premiere receiving publicity on February 2, 1942. In addition to the Oscar nomination for Best Picture, the film also earned a Best Director nomination for Sam Wood and Best Cinematographer, Black-and-White nomination for James Wong Howe.

More than a decade later, Warner Bros Television chose its Best Picture nominees for 1942, Kings Row (the studio had one other nominee, Yankee Doodle Dandy) and 1943, Casablanca (in addition to the winner, Warners had a second nominee, Watch on the Rhine), as television's initial two series to be directly derived from theatrical films. The third rotating element of Warner Bros. Presents, Cheyenne, the first of seven westerns produced for ABC, was a non-directly-derivative concept (Warners 1947 western, Cheyenne has no connection to the series) which also made history as TV's first hour-long western and also the first western series made for adults, rather than children, who had been watching such half-hour series as The Lone Ranger and The Cisco Kid since the earliest years of full-schedule TV programming. Analogous to the abbreviated time allotted for Kings Row, 8 of Casablanca's 10 installments and 8 of Cheyenne's 15 installments were also 48 minutes in length.

Social historian Otto Friedrich, in his 1986 book, City of Nets: A Portrait of Hollywood in the 1940s, describes the town which, at the beginning of the 1942 film, characterizes itself on a billboard in these words: "Kings Row 1890 — A Good Town — A Good Clean Town — A Good Town to Live In and a good place to Raise Your Children", as a "roiling inferno of fraud, corruption, treachery, hypocrisy, class warfare, and ill-suppressed sex of all varieties: adultery, sadism, homosexuality, incest."

== Kings Row, the series ==
The elements which made the 1942 film difficult to be accepted by Hollywood's Production Code Authority were nowhere in evidence as the TV version went into production. The stories were molded into the style of standard TV drama of the period, omitting any mention of themes which would have been considered inappropriate for an early-evening audience. Actor Paul Stewart, assigned to direct the first episode, told columnist Bob Thomas that "the company will rehearse five days and shoot five days for the 48-minute dramas". "Everything is done in the authentic 1905 era", he remarked, "Some of the stuff is fabulous. I'd estimate we have $30,000 worth of furnishings here. Then we have an exterior set on the back lot of a Midwestern town".

== Series characters ==
Parris Mitchell, portrayed by Jack Kelly, is the central personality who interacts with the conflicts in each episode's storylines, while Randy (Nan Leslie) and Drake (Robert Horton) are positioned as important supporting characters. Other characters from the book, including Dr. Henry Gordon, portrayed by Robert Burton, and Dr. Alexander Tower, portrayed by former second-tier film star Victor Jory, shorn of any unacceptably negative traits that their characters have in the novel and in the film, appear intermittently in the series. Tower becomes the central focus of the storyline in episode 5, "Introduction to Erica". Lillian Bronson, as Parris' grandmother, is retained as a semi-regular in the series.

Two years later, Jack Kelly would begin the role of Bart Maverick, brother to James Garner's Bret Maverick, in the television series Maverick for Warner Bros. and ABC, a part he continued for five seasons on the show. Also in 1957, Robert Horton would play the lead role of wagon train scout "Flint McCullough" in the television series Wagon Train starring Ward Bond and, after Bond's abrupt death, John McIntire. Both Kelly and Horton began their respective new series in 1957, concurrently playing their parts for five seasons before departing from the roles for which they were both most closely identified for the rest of their careers.

== Episodes ==
No.	Title	Directed by	Written by	Guest cast	Original release date
1	"Lady in Fear"	Paul Stewart	Jameson Brewer	Russell Johnson...Mark, Peggy Webber...Eloise, George Chandler...Carstairs, Myrna Fahey...Renee, Jack Macy...Skeffington	September 13, 1955
Parris Mitchell (Jack Kelly) spent years in Vienna studying to become a psychiatrist. Returning to his hometown of Kings Row to set up a practice, he finds the place mistrustful and prejudiced. His attempts to help Eloise resolve problems with her husband Mark (Russell Johnson) meet with resistance. In the promotional segment, host Gig Young interviews Alan Ladd and June Allyson about the upcoming release of their Warners film The McConnell Story.
2	"Two of a Kind"	Richard L. Bare	Charles Lang	Wallace Ford...Uncle Ezra, Peter Votrian...Tim	October 4, 1955
Dr. Mitchell tries to help thirteen-year-old Tim Browton (Peter Votrian) who has been branded a juvenile delinquent. The tall tales spun by glib old man Ezra Sligo (Wallace Ford) help Tim to overcome traumatic memories and become convinced that the elderly talker is an old-time hero. In the promotional segment, Gig Young talks to John Wayne and Lauren Bacall on the set of their new Warners film Blood Alley.
3	"Ellie (a/k/a Possessive Love)"	Paul Stewart	Richard Morris; story by Roy Huggins	Joy Page...Ellie, Kathryn Givney...Millicent Banning	October 25, 1955
Dr. Mitchell's patient, Ellie (Joy Page), suffers emotional problems as a result of lifelong domination by her mother Millicent (Kathryn Givney): Note: actress Joy Page was the stepdaughter of Warners studio head Jack L. Warner and was married to Warner Bros Television executive producer William T. Orr; In the promotional segment, Gig Young talks to Jack Palance and Shelley Winters on the set of their new Warners film I Died a Thousand Times.
4	"Mail Order Bride"	Unknown	Unknown	Lee Patrick...Mrs. Johnson, Rhys Williams...Kevin Monaghan	November 15, 1955
The widowed father (Rhys Williams) of Randy (series regular Nan Leslie) has entered into a lonelyhearts correspondence with a seemingly younger woman (Lee Patrick) and decides to send for her, along with his offer of marriage. Upon her arrival, however, she exhibits signs of being a confidence woman. In the promotional segment, Gig Young interviews Jack Palance on the set of his Warners film I Died a Thousand Times.
5	"Introduction to Erica"	Paul Stewart	Kenneth Higgins	Maria Palmer...Erica Schiller, John Alderson......Mike Polich, Isa Ashdown...Child, Nadine Ashdown...Child	December 6, 1955
Rigidly old-fashioned Doctor Tower (Victor Jory) receives, as a guest from Germany, a beautiful young widow (Maria Palmer) who proposes marriage. She soon becomes unhappy, however, when gossiping townspeople start spreading rumors regarding her relationship with the doctor. In the promotional segment, Gig Young interviews Liberace on the set of his Warners film Sincerely Yours.
6	"Wedding Gift"	Unknown	Unknown	Dennis Hopper...Ted Monaghan, Natalie Wood...Renee Gyllinson	December 27, 1955
After his discharge from the military, Tod Monaghan (Dennis Hopper) becomes unhappy due to perception that his fiancée Renee Gyllinson (Natalie Wood) is running his life.
7	"Carnival"	Unknown	Unknown	Dennis Hopper...Ted Monaghan, Natalie Wood...Renee Gyllinson, Sydney Chaplin...Tiger Hudson, Maggie Mahoney...Louise Thornton, Claire Kelly...Little Egypt	January 17, 1956
A glib carnival announcer is planning a relationship with one of King Row's socially connected women. His dancer girlfriend at the carnival plans revenge.

== Sources ==
- Anderson, Christopher. Hollywood TV: The Studio System in the Fifties. Austin: University of Texas Press, 1994.
- Balio, Tino, editor. Hollywood in the Age of Television. Boston: Unwin, Hyman, 1990.
- Woolley, Lynn; Malsbary, Robert W. and Strange, Robert G., Jr. Warner Brothers Television: Every Show of the Fifties and Sixties, Episode by Episode. Jefferson, North Carolina: McFarland, 1985.
