= Sneak Preview (TV series) =

American television anthology series

- Genre: Anthology series
- Presented by: Nelson Case
- Country of origin: United States
- Original language: English
- No. of seasons: 1
- No. of episodes: 7

Production
- Running time: 30 minutes

Original release
- Network: NBC
- Release: July 3 – August 14, 1956

Sneak Preview is an American anthology television series that aired on NBC in the summer of 1956. The 30-minute episodes consisted of unsold television pilots.

== Background ==
By the mid-1950s, the practice of television executives of ordering dozens of pilots for proposed television series each year – far more than their networks could possibly broadcast as series – had created a sizable body of unsold pilots that had never aired. By 1954, the American television industry had begun to consider the idea of packaging these unsold pilots in anthology series and airing them during the summer, providing television networks with a way of both providing fresh programming during the summer rerun season and recouping at least some of the expense of producing them. NBC was one of the pioneers of the concept, premiering Sneak Preview on the evening of July 3, 1956, at exactly the same time as another anthology series of unsold pilots, G.E. Summer Originals on ABC, thus becoming one of the first two series of unsold pilots to air in the United States. Nelson Case hosted the series.

== Broadcast history ==
Sneak Preview ran for seven episodes over the course of seven weeks in the summer of 1956, airing on NBC from 9:00 to 9:30 p.m. on Tuesday evenings. It premiered on July 3, and its last episode aired on August 14.

== Episodes ==
No. in season	Title	Directed by	Written by	Original release date
1	"Just Plain Folks"	Bob Finkel	Cy Howard	July 3, 1956
A satirical comedy about the behind-the-scenes life of a typical Hollywood married couple: an actress and her writer husband. Starring Zsa Zsa Gabor, Cy Howard, Stephen Bekassy, Norma Varden, and George Baxter.
2	"The Merry-Go-Round"	Ted Post	Mel Dinelli	July 10, 1956
When two young boys try to stop a carousel owner from robbing a widow, they discover a magic merry-go-round that can make its owner younger or older as it spins backward or forward. Starring Whit Bissell, Virginia Christine, Leo Gordon, Peter J. Votrian, Gladys Hurlbut, Barry Froner, and Whitey Haupt. A thriller adapted from the story "The Black Ferris" by Ray Bradbury.
3	"One Minute from Broadway"	Roy Kellino	Sig Herzig & Frederick Stephani	July 17, 1956
Romance blossoms as the manager and residents of a hotel for literary and theatrical people help a young aspiring actress from Pennsylvania to begin her career on the stage. Starring Brian Aherne, Claire Carleton, John Carradine, Gloria Talbott, Eddy Waller, Shirley O'Hara, Jimmy Lydon, Frances Brandt, Creighton Hale, and Michael Colgan.
4	"Real George"	Unknown	Unknown	July 24, 1956
After years of hard work as a stock clerk in a store, a man finally receives a promotion to "salesman, junior grade," only to get in trouble constantly with his nautically minded boss, who runs the store as if it was a United States Navy ship. His woes begin on his first day as a salesman, when he mistakenly sells half a pair of pajamas to a man and the other half to a woman and nearly loses his job. Nonetheless, he wins over a woman he is attracted to. Starring George O'Hanlon and Ray Collins.
5	"The Way Back"	Erle C. Kenton	William P. Rousseau & Richard Saunders	July 31, 1956
Pat Duggan, a parole division chief interested in helping juvenile delinquents who have just been released from prison, works with a young parolee to assist him in getting a job and adjusting to society. The youngster shows signs of sliding back into a life of crime and it takes all of Duggan's efforts to keep him on the right side of the law, and his faith in the young man is so great that he even gives him an unauthorized "break" to keep him out of trouble. Starring Pat O'Brien, Ellen Corby, Douglas Kennedy, Irene Hervey, Darryl Hickman, and Robert Arthur.
6	"Carolyn"	Unknown	Unknown	August 7, 1956
After her best friend dies and leaves her as the guardian of three young children, Carolyn Daniels, a beautiful and successful actress, moves from New York City to a small town and tries to win their trust and affection. Starring Celeste Holm.
7	"Calling Terry Conway"	Unknown	Unknown	August 14, 1956
Terry Conway, the high-pressure director of publicity and public relations for a glamorous, ultramodern hotel in Las Vegas, Nevada, stirs up trouble as she becomes embroiled in a variety of situations while trying to do her job. Starring Ann Sheridan.
