= Stage Show (TV series) =

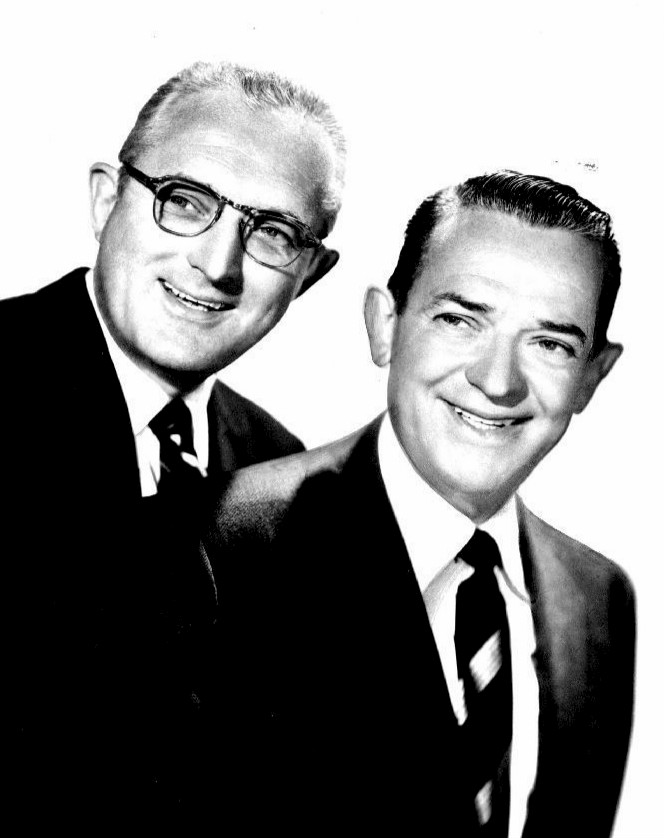
- Tommy and Jimmy Dorsey as hosts, 1955.
- Directed by: Frank Satenstein
- Starring: Tommy and Jimmy Dorsey (hosts 1954–55); Jack Carter (host 1956)
- Country of origin: United States

Production
- Producer: Jackie Gleason Productions
- Camera setup: multi-camera
- Running time: 60 minutes and 30 minutes

Original release
- Network: CBS TV
- Release: July 3, 1954 – September 18, 1956

Stage Show is a popular music variety series broadcast in the United States on the CBS Television Network and originally hosted on alternate weeks by big band leaders and brothers Tommy and Jimmy Dorsey. Produced by Jackie Gleason, it included the first national television appearances by rock music icon Elvis Presley.

The series began as a one-hour show on July 3, 1954, as a summer replacement for The Jackie Gleason Show. In late 1955 it debuted from 8–8:30 p.m. ET, on Saturdays in the time slot prior to The Honeymooners, his own series.

In 1956, Jack Carter, a frequent guest, became the permanent host. The June Taylor Dancers made regular appearances. Bobby Darin made his national TV debut on the program in early 1956, singing "Rock Island Line". Placed against the popular The Perry Como Show on NBC, Stage Show's ratings declined. The final telecast, September 18, 1956, came only two months before the death of Tommy Dorsey. Brother Jimmy died in June of the following year.

Famed jazz saxophonist Charlie Parker died in 1955 while watching the show on television.

== Elvis Presley appearances ==
Elvis Presley made his network television debut on Stage Show. He was introduced by Cleveland, Ohio disc jockey Bill Randle on the January 28, 1956, broadcast performing "Shake, Rattle and Roll", "Flip, Flop and Fly" and "I Got a Woman". He made five more appearances during the next eight weeks:

- February 4: "Baby Let's Play House" and "Tutti Frutti"
- February 11: "Blue Suede Shoes" and "Heartbreak Hotel"
- February 18: "Tutti Frutti" and "I Was The One"
- March 17: "Blue Suede Shoes" and "Heartbreak Hotel"
- March 24: "Money Honey" and "Heartbreak Hotel"

These shows were preserved on kinescope films. Complete songs and segments have been released within various Elvis Presley documentaries and home video compilations.
