= G.E. Summer Originals =

American television anthology series

- A July 3, 1956, advertisement for the premiere episode of G.E. Summer Originals, starring Vivian Blaine.
- Genre: Anthology series
- Country of origin: United States
- Original language: English
- No. of seasons: 1
- No. of episodes: 10

Production
- Running time: 30 minutes

Original release
- Network: ABC
- Release: July 3 – September 18, 1956

G.E. Summer Originals, referred to in some sources as General Electric Summer Originals, is an American anthology television series that aired on the American Broadcasting Company (ABC) in the summer of 1956. The 30-minute episodes consisted of unsold television pilots.

Among stars appearing in the unsold pilots were Ronald Reagan, James Mason, Vera Miles, Hugh Beaumont, and Barbara Billingsley. Their directors included feature directors Budd Boetticher and Don Weis.

== Background ==
By the mid-1950s, the practice of television executives of ordering dozens of pilots for proposed television series each year – far more than their networks could possibly broadcast as series – had created a sizable body of unsold pilots that had never aired. By 1954, the American television industry had begun to consider the idea of packaging these unsold pilots in anthology series and airing them during the summer, providing television networks with a way of both providing fresh programming during the summer rerun season and recouping at least some of the expense of producing them.

On June 8, 1956, The New York Times reported that the American Broadcasting Company (ABC) would begin airing a package of unsold pilots that summer under the title G.E. Summer Originals, adding that "the problem of what to do with ‘pilot’ or sample films of projected television series that previously have failed to sell has been solved." The series premiered on the evening of July 3, 1956, at exactly the same time as another anthology series of unsold pilots, Sneak Preview on NBC, thus becoming one of the first two series of unsold pilots to air in the United States.

== Broadcast history ==
G.E. Summer Originals ran for 10 episodes over the course of 12 weeks in the summer of 1956, airing on ABC from 9:00 to 9:30 p.m. on Tuesday evenings. It premiered on July 3, and its last episode aired on September 18. It was preempted on August 14 and 21 by ABC's coverage of the 1956 Democratic National Convention.

== Episodes ==
No. in season	Title	Directed by	Written by	Original release date
1	"It's Sunny Again"	Unknown	Unknown	July 3, 1956
A popular singer badly needs work and her smooth-talking manager uses trickery to try get her bookings – but his tricks fail, and he gets fired. Starring Vivian Blaine, Jules Munshin, and Shirley Mitchell. Vivian Blaine sings "Singin' in the Rain" and "Manhattan."
2	"Duel at Dawn"	Unknown	Unknown	July 10, 1956
Major Linden, an 18th-century military officer, must choose between fighting a dangerous duel in which he will face almost certain death or being accused of cowardice, and his fiancé begs him to withdraw from the duel. Starring James Mason, Pamela Kellino, and Scott Forbes.
3	"Country Store"	Unknown	Unknown	July 17, 1956
When an immigrant arrives in a small American town, the kindly and understanding owner of a country store gives him a job. The storekeeper gets taken advantage of, but the experience gives him an idea that allows him to teach his fellow townspeople a lesson in American democracy at a town dinner. Starring Joe E. Brown. Based on the 1935 movie Ruggles of Red Gap. Unsold pilot for the proposed series The Joe E. Brown Show.
4	"The Unwilling Witness"	Unknown	Unknown	July 24, 1956
After a boy is charged with the murder of a gambler named Red Bailey and faces the death penalty, the handsome, fast-talking Nevada criminal defense lawyer Reno English takes his case. Convinced of the boy's innocence but lacking evidence with which to defend him, English finds Debora Payne, the only person in a position to witness the murder, but she refuses to provide English with information that would save the boy. English discovers that Debora's brother Paul has disappeared suddenly, and that Paul owed Bailey money, and a tense and suspenseful courtroom drama unfolds. Starring Zachary Scott and Frances Rafferty.
5	"Alias Mike Hercules"	Unknown	Unknown	July 31, 1956
The quick-witted private investigator Mike Hercules and his assistant "The Professor" solve a US$100,000 kidnapping case involving a reformed ex-convict. Starring Hugh Beaumont, Reginald Denny, and Anne Kimbell. Unsold pilot for the proposed series Alias Mike Hercules.
6	"The Green Parrot"	Unknown	Unknown	August 7, 1956
A scientist who worked on atomic fission experiments has died and willed his pet talking parrot Cleopatra – who has a photographic memory and can repeat many of the scientific formulas the scientist worked on – to the United States Department of War. As a representative of the Government of France, a French agent is given the task of conveying Cleopatra to her new owners, but his assignment becomes more complicated when an operative of a hostile foreign power who knows about Cleopatra's talent for conveying formulas tries to get control of her. Starring Claude Dauphin. Filmed in Europe.
7	"Blizzard Bound"	Unknown	Robert Leslie Bellem	August 28, 1956
Fur trapper Steve MacGregor returns to his cabin in the wilds of northern Canada and finds Marie Lebec, a beautiful multiracial woman of white and North American native ethnicity, cleaning it. They become trapped together in the cabin during a blizzard and develop a genuine affection for one another. A romantic relationship begins to develop between them – until a plane crash at the height of the blizzard interrupts their lives. Starring Forrest Tucker, Donna Martell, and Bill Phipps.
8	"Dawn at Damascus"	Unknown	Unknown	September 4, 1956
A servant is responsible for clearing up a murder plot before it can be carried out as love and intrigue play out and distrust develops in an oil camp in the Middle East where the lust for oil is the driving force. Starring Gene Raymond (as an American engineer), Paula Corday, and Donald Murphy.
9	"The Great Lady"	Unknown	Unknown	September 11, 1956
Wealthy actress Julia Courtney retires and opens a theatrical boarding house for young actresses, choosing to live there despite her wealth. When one of the young actresses is murdered at the house, all the residents come under suspicion, with Sarah Larkin as the chief suspect. Julia turns detective and becomes involved in intrigue as she tries try to solve the murder case and help her protégé. Starring Ann Harding and Vera Miles.
10	"The Jungle Trap"	Unknown	Unknown	September 18, 1956
While leading a safari, an embittered man trying to escape the tragic memory of his brother learns that one of the men under his charge is the judge who sentenced his brother to death. Starring Ronald Reagan and Lewis Martin.
