= Five Star Jubilee =

- Genre: country music variety
- Directed by: Fred I. Rains
- Starring: Rex Allen; Snooky Lanson; Tex Ritter; Carl Smith; Jimmy Wakely
- Voices of: Joe Slattery
- Country of origin: United States
- Original language: English
- No. of seasons: summer

Production
- Executive producers: Si Siman; John B. Mahaffey
- Producer: Bryan T. Bisney
- Camera setup: multi-camera
- Running time: 30 minutes
- Production company: Crossroads TV Productions

Original release
- Network: NBC-TV
- Release: March 17 – September 22, 1961

Related
- Jubilee USA

L-R: Tex Ritter, Jimmy Wakely, Snooky Lanson, Carl Smith and Rex Allen at the Landers Theatre. Note the Massey Ferguson tractor at right.

Five Star Jubilee is an American country music variety show carried by NBC-TV from March 17–September 22, 1961. The live program, a spin-off of ABC-TV's Jubilee USA, was the first network color television series to originate outside New York City or Hollywood.

From March 17 to May 5, the weekly show aired on Fridays from 8–8:30 p.m. Eastern Time, but moved to 8:30–9 p.m. from May 12 to September 22. The series featured five rotating hosts: Snooky Lanson (first show March 17), Tex Ritter (March 24), Rex Allen (March 31), Jimmy Wakely (April 7) and Carl Smith (April 14). All five appeared on the May 12 show, which was the first in color.

Produced from the Landers Theatre in Springfield, Missouri, the program was similar to Jubilee USA and featured some of the same cast, including Bobby Lord, Cecil Brower, Speedy Haworth and Slim Wilson's Jubilee Band. Barbara Mandrell (who had toured with Red Foley and a Jubilee USA personal appearance unit) made her network debut on the program at age 12. The final program was hosted by Foley, who also appeared on the July 7 show. In April he had been acquitted of tax evasion charges, which were believed to have originally kept him out of consideration as a host. The sponsor was Massey Ferguson.

== Performers ==
- Roy Acuff and the Smoky Mountain Boys
- Jeanne and Janie Black
- Margie Bowes
- Uncle Cyp and Aunt Sap Brasfield
- Cecil Brower
- Martha Carson
- June Carter
- The Carter Family
- Jimmy Dean
- Jimmy Driftwood
- Ralph Emery
- Flatt and Scruggs
- The Foggy River Boys
- Red Foley
- Sally Foley
- The Four Fuller Brothers
- Don Gibson
- Johnny Gimble
- Betty Ann Grove
- Speedy Haworth
- Betty Johnson
- Grandpa Jones
- Claude King
- Pee Wee King
- Linda Lee
- Bobby Lord
- Barbara Mandrell
- Harold Morrison and Jimmy Gately
- Hank Morton
- Les Paul and Mary Ford
- Minnie Pearl
- Ray Price
- The Queen City Jazz Band
- Carmel Quinn
- Margie Singleton
- Redd Stewart
- Cathie Taylor
- June Valli
- The Wagon Wheelers
- Bun Wilson
- Slim Wilson
- Faron Young

== Production ==
Five Star Jubilee debuted March 17, 1961 in black-and-white, but switched to color on May 12. The first two color programs (May 12 and 19) were videotaped beginning at 1:30 a.m. local time Friday (for playback that evening) after nearby KTTS-AM signed off at 1:00 a.m., because of unforeseen RF interference from its transmitter with the color TV picture. Despite the hour, both shows had audiences at the theater. NBC resolved the problem for the May 26 program, which was the first live color show. The series was aired by 150 NBC affiliates, although not by WNBC-TV in New York.

The program was produced from the Landers Theatre with KYTV-TV's assistance using two new NBC color mobile units (built for World Series coverage) and three RCA TK-41 cameras. Because it was the first color TV series outside New York City or Hollywood, scenic designer Andy Miller created the first color scenic stage sets for television outside those two cities after receiving brief training at NBC in New York. The director was Fred Rains (floor director for Jubilee USA) and the consulting producer was the Jubilee's Bryan Bisney. Scriptwriters were Don Richardson and Bob Tubert.
