= Ozark Jubilee =

First network TV program to feature country music stars

- Also known as: Country Music Jubilee; Jubilee USA
- Created by: Lester E. Cox; Ralph D. Foster; John Mahaffey; Si Siman
- Directed by: Bryan T. Bisney
- Starring: Red Foley
- Voices of: Joe Slattery
- Theme music composer: Hank Garland/Jack Yellen
- Opening theme: "Sugar-Foot Rag"
- Ending theme: "Alabama Jubilee"
- Country of origin: United States
- Original language: English
- No. of seasons: 6
- No. of episodes: 297

Production
- Executive producers: Si Siman; John B. Mahaffey
- Producer: Bryan T. Bisney
- Production locations: Springfield, Missouri, USA
- Camera setup: Multi-camera
- Running time: 60 minutes; also 90 and 30 minutes
- Production companies: RadiOzark Enterprises (1953-54); Crossroads TV Productions (1955-60)

Original release
- Network: ABC-TV; ABC Radio (1954-61)
- Release: January 22, 1955 – September 24, 1960

Related
- Five Star Jubilee; Talent Varieties

Ozark Jubilee is a 1950s American television program that featured country music's top stars of the day. It was produced in Springfield, Missouri. The weekly live stage show premiered on ABC-TV on January 22, 1955, was renamed Country Music Jubilee on July 6, 1957, and was finally named Jubilee USA on August 2, 1958. Originating "from the heart of the Ozarks", the Saturday night variety series helped popularize country music in America's cities and suburbs, drawing more than nine million viewers. The ABC Radio version was heard by millions more starting in August 1954.

A typical program included a mix of vocal and instrumental performances, comedy routines, square dancing and an occasional novelty act. The host was Red Foley, one of the nation's top country music personalities having been ranked by Billboard as the #5 Top Country Artist for the 1940s and #5 in the 1950s. Big names such as Patsy Cline, Eddy Arnold, Johnny Cash and Faron Young were interspersed with a regular cast, including a group of young talent the Jubilee brought to national fame: 11-year-old Brenda Lee, Porter Wagoner, Wanda Jackson, Sonny James, Jean Shepard and The Browns. Other featured cast members were Webb Pierce, Bobby Lord, Leroy Van Dyke, Norma Jean and Carl Smith.

Carl Perkins, singing "Blue Suede Shoes", made his TV debut on the series, which showcased hundreds of popular artists performing everything from rockabilly, country and western, bluegrass and honky tonk to the Nashville sound, gospel and folk. Several now-legendary session musicians provided accompaniment at times during the show's run, including Grady Martin, Hank Garland, Bob Moore, Charlie Haden, Cecil Brower, Tommy Jackson and Bud Isaacs. The genial Foley closed each show from the Jewell Theatre in downtown Springfield with a "song of inspiration" or a recitation from his Keepsake Album; and his sign-off was "Goodnight mama, goodnight papa", before walking into the audience to shake hands as the credits rolled.

The Jubilee was canceled after almost six years as rock and roll grew in popularity, and in part because of publicity surrounding tax evasion charges against Foley, who was later acquitted. On September 24, 1960, the final telecast, like the first in 1955, opened with Foley's singing of "Hearts of Stone". The program concluded with his performance of "May the Good Lord Bless and Keep You". The series was voted Best Country Music Show by Fame magazine's annual TV critics poll in 1957 and 1960. In 1961, NBC-TV carried a spin-off, Five Star Jubilee.

== Earlier country music television programs ==
The first (and first live) country music program on network television was Village Barn, broadcast from 1948–50 by NBC from a New York City nightclub. From the late 1940s through the 1950s, the U.S. networks carried a handful of other country music shows, including Hayloft Hoedown and ABC Barn Dance (ABC); Saturday Night Jamboree (NBC); and Windy City Jamboree and The Old American Barn Dance (DuMont). NBC and later ABC also aired Midwestern Hayride. The shows, however, were generally short-lived summer replacements and had few if any well-known performers.

Ozark Jubilee was the first network TV program to feature America's top country music stars, and as a result, was the first country music program to attract a significant national viewership. At five years and eight months, it also holds the record for the longest-running country music series on network television (Hee Haw was syndicated after two years on CBS, and Austin City Limits presents a much broader variety of music).

== ABC-TV schedules ==
(all times are Eastern Time—all running times include commercial breaks)

- 1954–55 season (Ozark Jubilee) Starting January 22, 1955: Saturday, 9–10 p.m. Starting July 2, 1955: Saturday, 7:30–9 p.m.
- 1955–56 season (Ozark Jubilee): Saturday, 7:30–9 p.m.
- 1956–57 season (Ozark Jubilee) Starting October 4, 1956: Thursday, 10–11 p.m. Starting December 29, 1956: Saturday, 8–9 p.m.
- 1957–58 season (Country Music Jubilee): Saturday, 8–9 p.m.
- 1958–59 season (Jubilee USA) Starting September 29, 1958: Monday, 8–8:30 p.m. Starting November 1, 1958: Saturday, 8–9 p.m.
- 1959–60 season (Jubilee USA) Starting October 3, 1959: Saturday, 10–11 p.m. – September 24, 1960

From October 15, 1955, to September 15, 1956, the program aired from 7:30–8 p.m. every fourth Saturday when ABC televised The Grand Ole Opry live from 8–9 p.m. From March through September 1956, the "Junior Jubilee" edition aired in the 7:30–8 p.m. time slot. In contrast to many network series which went on summer hiatus, the Jubilee was live throughout the year.

== Red Foley and the rise of Springfield ==
During the late 1940s and 1950s, Springfield broadcasters Ralph Foster, Si Siman, John Mahaffey (Foster's nephew), and Lester E. Cox produced nationally syndicated radio shows through their company, RadiOzark Enterprises. The programs were aired locally over KWTO, also a stepping-stone for numerous country stars. Their stable of country music shows and talent grew, and Foster believed Springfield could dethrone Nashville to become the "crossroads of country music." He realized television was the key, and named his new company Crossroads TV Productions, Inc., with Siman, Cox, and Mahaffey as managing vice presidents. In December 1953, they launched Ozark Jubilee on Springfield's KYTV-TV, of which Cox was also co-owner.

Red Foley Jubilee publicity photo

In April 1954, after extensive negotiations, Siman lured Red Foley from Nashville to host the show with a one-year contract, renewed for three more in 1955. It was a major coup; Foley was considered by many to be America's top country music star. In 1946 he replaced Roy Acuff as emcee of the Grand Ole Opry segment carried by NBC Radio, and his popularity during the following eight years was credited with establishing it as the number one country music show. Three months later, in July 1954, ABC-TV agreed to buy the Jubilee; and by August, was carrying a radio version hosted by Foley that had begun in July on KWTO.

To represent the regular performers on KWTO and the Jubilee, in March 1955 Foster established Top Talent, Inc., in partnership with Siman; and to publish their songs, Siman established Earl Barton Music, Inc. with partners Foster, Mahaffey and Cox. Siman also handled talent bookings for the show. Foster, known by cast and crew as "the Skipper", made an appearance on the final broadcast of Jubilee USA, singing "Woodman, Spare that Tree".

By 1956, Springfield, with two other ABC shows, ranked behind only New York and Hollywood for originating network television programming. Top Talent was booking Jubilee artists across the country, and that April, the Jubilee had finished third among men. According to The St. Louis Post-Dispatch that February, "Springfield has become the recognized center of the country music world. In fact, it is generally agreed in television, recording and radio circles, that Springfield, now a city of 90,000, has shaken Nashville, Tennessee, home of The Grand Ole Opry and long-time mecca of hillbilly musicians, to its very foundations." But the 1957 departures of Porter Wagoner and Brenda Lee to the Music City signaled the shift would not be permanent, and Springfield never generated the business or revenues of Nashville.

Publicity surrounding federal income tax evasion charges pending against Foley during 1960 influenced ABC's decision to cancel the program, although his first trial that fall ended in a hung jury; and after a second trial he was quickly acquitted on April 23, 1961. The previous October, ABC had begun airing the popular Fight of the Week in the Jubilee's former time slot (the show had replaced The Saturday Night Fights in 1955).

== Performers ==
=== Cast ===
The Ozark Jubilee cast was originally headlined by Wanda Jackson, Norma Jean, Bobby Lord, Webb Pierce, Marvin Rainwater, Porter Wagoner and Slim Wilson, who was also front man for both the Tall Timber Trio, made up of "Speedy" Haworth (guitar), Bob White (bass guitar) and "Doc" Martin (steel guitar); and the Jubilee Band, composed of Haworth, Martin, White, Johnny Gailey (drums), Paul Mitchell (piano) and Zed Tennis (fiddle). Featured vocalists included Leroy Van Dyke, Suzi Arden, Chuck Bowers, Sonny James, Tommy Sosebee and Tabby West. Singers Hawkshaw Hawkins and Jean Shepard, who met on the show, later married.

Ozark Jubilee cast at the Jewell Theatre, 1956

The versatile Wilson was also half of the show's Flash and Whistler (with Floyd "Goo Goo" Rutledge); and Rutledge was half of Lennie and Goo Goo (with Lennie Aleshire), both country music comedy duos. Other comedians were Pete Stamper, Shug Fisher, KWTO's Bill Ring, Uncle Cyp and Aunt Sap Brasfield, and Luke Warmwater.

The cast also included The Foggy River Boys, a singing quartet later known as The Marksmen (George Richardson, Les Robertson, Don Taylor and Earl Terry); Harold Morrison (banjo) and Jimmy Gately (guitar), a bluegrass duo; and The Wagoner Trio, made up of Wagoner, Haworth and Don Warden (steel guitar).

The house band was first known as The Crossroads Boys, composed of Grady Martin, Billy Burke, Bud Isaacs, Tommy Jackson, Paul Mitchell, Jimmy Selph, Bob Moore and Mel Bly; but the name was soon changed to Bill Wimberly and His Country Rhythm Boys, a seven-piece group that alternated weekly during 1955 with Grady Martin and His Winging Strings, featuring Moore, Jackson, Isaacs and Hank Garland.

Pierce hosted the first half-hour of the 90-minute programs once a month beginning October 15, 1955; Wagoner and James joined him in monthly rotation from January through at least July 1956. Substitute hosts included Wilson, Eddy Arnold, and Jim Reeves (May–July 1958). The on-camera announcer was Joe Slattery, a former Pan Am and US Army Air Forces pilot who later became president of AFTRA.

The Jubilee featured two square dance groups: the Promenaders (with caller Lowell "L. D." Keller), a competitive team originally from Southwest Missouri State College; and a children's group from Camdenton, Missouri, the (Lake of the Ozarks) Tadpoles (with caller Buford Foster). Several other groups, including the Ozark Sashayers (with caller Rex Kreider) and the teenage Wagon Wheelers (with caller Gary Ellison), made guest appearances.

Foley's son-in-law, Pat Boone, occasionally appeared; as did his eldest daughter, Betty. Willie Nelson and his eventual third wife, Shirley Simpson, both auditioned for the show, but only Simpson (given the stage surname Caddell) made it. Many of the regular cast were natives or residents of the Ozarks. Over the years they included:

- Lennie Aleshire
- Suzi Arden
- Chuck Bowers
- Uncle Cyp and Aunt Sap Brasfield
- Cecil Brower
- The Browns
- Smiley Burnette
- Shirley Caddell
- Bill Carlisle
- Thumbs Carllile
- Curly Chalker
- Arlie Duff
- Patsy Elshire
- James "Rusty" Estes
- Buster Fellows
- Shug Fisher
- The Foggy River Boys
- Johnny Gailey
- Alfred "Red" Gale
- Jimmy Gately
- Charlie Haden
- Hawkshaw Hawkins
- "Speedy" Haworth
- Libby Horne
- Bud Isaacs
- Tommy Jackson
- Wanda Jackson
- Sonny James
- Norma Jean
- Brenda Lee
- Merl Lindsay
- Bobby Lord
- Johnny Manson
- Bryan "Doc" Martin
- Grady Martin
- Paul Mitchell
- Bob Moore
- Harold Morrison
- Penny Nichols
- The Philharmonics
- Webb Pierce
- Marvin Rainwater
- Bill Ring
- Floyd "Goo Goo" Rutledge
- Jimmie Selph
- Jean Shepard
- Tommy Sosebee
- Carl Smith
- Pete Stamper
- Zed Tennis
- Leroy Van Dyke
- Porter Wagoner
- Billy Walker
- Don Warden
- Luke Warmwater
- Tabby West
- Bob White
- The Willis Brothers
- Slim Wilson
- Bill Wimberly

=== Guest stars ===
Virtually every country music star of the day appeared on the Jubilee with the notable exception of Hank Snow, who maintained an allegiance to Nashville's Opry. Among them were:

- Roy Acuff
- Rex Allen
- Bill Anderson
- Chet Atkins
- Eddy Arnold
- Gene Autry
- Johnny Bond
- Margie Bowes
- The Carter Sisters
- Johnny Cash
- Don Cherry
- Sanford Clark
- Patsy Cline
- The Collins Kids
- Wilma Lee and Stoney Cooper
- Cowboy Copas
- Jimmie Davis
- Jimmy Dean
- Little Johnny Edwards
- Little Jimmy Dickens
- Jimmy Driftwood
- Tommy Duncan
- Lefty Frizzell
- George Hamilton IV
- Homer and Jethro
- Johnny Horton
- Jan Howard
- Ferlin Husky
- Stonewall Jackson
- Betty Johnson
- George Jones
- Grandpa Jones
- Pee Wee King
- Hank Locklin
- The Louvin Brothers
- Leon McAuliffe
- The Maddox Brothers and Rose
- Patsy Montana
- George Morgan
- Bashful Brother Oswald
- Buck Owens
- The Duke of Paducah
- Minnie Pearl
- Carl Perkins
- Ray Price
- Jim Reeves
- Tex Ritter
- Marty Robbins
- Margie Singleton
- Stringbean
- Hank Thompson
- Mel Tillis
- Merle Travis
- Ernest Tubb
- Conway Twitty
- T. Texas Tyler
- Gene Vincent
- Jimmy Wakely
- Kitty Wells
- Slim Whitman
- The Wilburn Brothers
- Tex Williams
- Bob Wills
- Del Wood
- Faron Young

Other guests included Fran Allison in a recurring role as Aunt Fanny; actors Betty Ann Grove, Jim Brown and Duncan Renaldo; and nationally syndicated columnist Earl Wilson. A young Wayne Newton performed with his brother as the Rascals in Rhythm. On January 14, 1956, the program's first anniversary, Tennessee Gov. Frank Clement, Missouri's U.S. senators Tom Hennings and Stuart Symington, and Missouri Lt. Gov. Jim Blair appeared, as did St. Louis Cardinals baseball star Stan Musial.

=== The Jubilee and Brenda Lee ===
On February 23, 1956, 11-year-old Brenda Lee, living in Augusta, Georgia, turned down $30 to sing on a Swainsboro radio station to see Foley and a visiting Jubilee promotional unit at Bell Auditorium. A local disc jockey convinced Foley to hear her sing before the show. He was stunned and agreed to let Lee perform "Jambalaya" that night. Foley later recalled his reaction:

I still get cold chills thinking about the first time I heard that voice. One foot started patting rhythm as though she was stomping out a prairie fire but not another muscle in that little body even as much as twitched. And when she did that trick of breaking her voice, it jarred me out of my trance enough to realize I'd forgotten to get off the stage. There I stood...after 26 years of supposedly learning how to conduct myself in front of an audience, with my mouth open two miles wide and a glassy stare in my eyes. The way I stood back and enjoyed watching her work I felt guilty for not going out to the box office and buying a ticket.

Jubilee producer-director Bryan Bisney contacted her stepfather, Buell "Jay" Rainwater, who mailed him a tape recording of Lee singing "Jambalaya" on an Augusta radio show with a snapshot of Lee in Cincinnati, Ohio with Jimmie Skinner (who had appeared on the show in 1955). He booked her network debut for March 31, 1956 to sing "Jambalaya" on the second "Junior Jubilee" edition of the show.

The New York Journal American's Jack O'Brien began his April 1 column with, "Didn't catch the name of the 9-year-old [sic] singer on last night's Ozark Jubilee but she belts a song like a star." The show received three times the usual fan mail with nearly every letter asking to see her again, and Lee's family soon moved to Springfield. Although her five-year contract with Top Talent was broken by a 1957 lawsuit brought by her mother and her manager, she made regular appearances on the program throughout its run.

=== Carl Perkins, "Blue Suede Shoes", and Elvis ===
Carl Perkins and the Perkins Brothers Band made their television debut on Ozark Jubilee on March 17, 1956, performing Perkins' No. 1 hit, "Blue Suede Shoes" and the B side, "Honey Don't". The group included Perkins (lead guitar and vocalist), Jay Perkins (rhythm guitar), Clayton Perkins (bass guitar) and W.S. Holland (drums). Coincidentally, Elvis Presley performed the song that same Saturday night on CBS-TV's Stage Show, which overlapped the Jubilee from 8–8:30 p.m. ET (Presley first performed the song February 11 on Stage Show). An automobile accident en route to New York prevented the group from next appearing on The Perry Como Show on March 24. Perkins returned to the Jubilee on February 2, 1957 to again sing "Blue Suede Shoes" and his then-current hit, "Matchbox".

Both Perkins and Presley were fans of the Jubilee. In 1955, Presley saw Charlie Hodge, his eventual friend and stage assistant, perform on the program. He first met Hodge when a Jubilee promotional unit later visited Memphis, Tennessee. That same year, Presley asked Bobby Lord to get him an appearance on the show, but Lord told Presley the producers viewed him as "a flash in the pan."

=== Patsy Cline ===
Patsy Cline made sixteen appearances on the Jubilee, which gave her the opportunity to choose her own material for a national audience. She first appeared in January 1956, returning on April 21. In 1957, she appeared on February 9; and on June 22 (the Oklahoma State Fair remote) she performed "Walkin' After Midnight" and "Try Again". On August 10, 1957 she sang her new single, "Three Cigarettes (In an Ashtray)" and "Try Again". Her December 5 appearance included "Make Believe", a duet with Foley; "I Don't Wanna Know"; and "Then You'll Know". During the program, Foley presented Cline with The Billboard's Most Promising County & Western Female Artist award, and Music Vendor magazine's award for Greatest Achievement in Records in 1957 (for "Walkin' After Midnight").

In 1958, Cline appeared on February 21 and April 26. On November 7, 1959, she sang "Walkin' After Midnight" and "Come on In", then "Let's Go to Church" as a duet with Slim Wilson. On December 7, she sang her "Got a Lot of Rhythm in My Soul" and "Lovesick Blues", released in January 1960; and sang duets with Ferlin Husky ("Let it Snow") and Foley ("Winter Wonderland"). On June 4, 1960, Cline soloed with "Lovesick Blues" and "How Can I Face Tomorrow", released in July; and sang "I'm Hogtied Over You" with Cowboy Copas and "Rueben, Reuben" with June Valli and Eddy Arnold.

== Junior Jubilee ==
Every fourth Saturday from March 31 through September 15 (and on December 13), 1956, a special edition of Ozark Jubilee showcased young country music performers. "Junior Jubilee" aired from 7:30–8 p.m. when ABC televised The Grand Ole Opry from 8–9 p.m. Although Foley appeared, 10-year-old singer Libby Horne of McAlester, Oklahoma was the ostensible emcee. Little Johnny Edwards 6-year-old singer of Sarcoxie, Missouri 1956. Brenda Lee made her first appearances on the program. Other performers included seven-year-old singer "Cookie" McKinney, guitarist John "Bucky" Wilkin, 12-year-old fiddler Clyde Wayne Spears, singer-guitarist Mike Breid, seven-year-old Billy Joe Morris, and child square dancers the Whirli-jiggers. "Junior Jubilee" first appeared as a show segment on November 19, 1955, and returned as a portion of Jubilee USA on November 8, 1958.

== Public service ==
Foley periodically asked viewers to contribute to various charities, including the March of Dimes, Easter Seals, Community Chest, and aid following the 1960 Great Chilean earthquake. Guests in 1956 included the Polio Mother of the Year and the March of Dimes poster family. Groups recognized on the program included the Girl Scouts and the Chiefs of Police.

The Jubilee also staged performances for inmates at the US Medical Center for Federal Prisoners in Springfield, including special Christmas shows.

== Audience and sponsors ==
During the program's 1955 premiere, Foley asked, "If you folks want us to come and visit at your house like this every Saturday night, why don't you drop me a line in Springfield, Missouri?" In the next week 25,258 cards and letters arrived from 45 of the 48 states, and the show typically received 6,000 letters each week. In May 1955, carried by 72 ABC affiliates, it was the only TV show with an audience equally divided among men, women and children, according to the American Research Bureau (ARB). For 1955, ABC reported these achievements for the program, citing ARB data:

- Largest male U.S. television audience
- 28 percent more per-set viewers than the average of all prime time shows
- Largest per-set U.S. television audience, 3.40 persons

By early 1956, the Jubilee had earned a 19.2 Nielsen rating, and ARB estimated its weekly TV audience to be as high as 9,078,000. (The $64,000 Question had the most viewers, 16,577,500.) By 1959 the show was carried by 150 affiliates, but rarely won its time slot, competing with such heavyweights as The Perry Como Show on NBC; and on CBS, The Honeymooners, Perry Mason, and in 1960, the top-rated Gunsmoke. Its ratings were also hampered when a few major-market affiliates such as WABC-TV took advantage of network break-away cues to carry 30- or, when it was 90 minutes, 60-minute portions.

ABC promoted and sold the program as prime family entertainment. Sponsors included the American Chicle Co., Rolaids, Anacin (1956), Williamson-Dickie (1957–60), Massey Ferguson (1958–60), Arrid, Postum (1958), Carter's Little Pills and Sargent's Dog Care Products (1960); and was sold nationally by Ted Bates & Company. Joe Slattery handled station breaks and some commercials, often appearing during Jubilee USA with Massey Ferguson farm tractors and accessories in film clips or on stage.

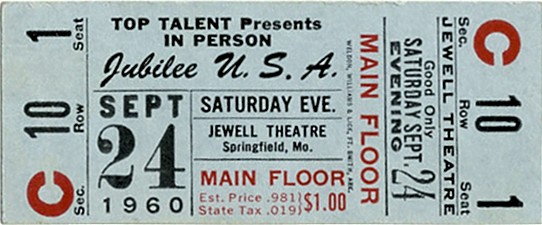
Ticket for the final Jubilee USA

The live audience was briefly part of the broadcasts when a camera would swing around to show the sold-out Jewell Theatre. Attendees, often nearly 90 percent out-of-state, would cheer and hold up signs or banners with the names of their hometowns. Producers estimated 350,000 people (from as many as 30 states on some nights) attended the performances at the Jewell from 1954–1960. Visitors also came from Canada, Mexico, Hawaii and Bermuda. Tickets had to be requested as long as six weeks in advance and it was believed to be the only network TV show with paid admission ($1.00 main floor, 75 cents balcony and 50 cents standing room). Second (non-broadcast) shows were frequently added to accommodate the demand during the summers.

The Jubilee regularly noted it was carried "coast to coast", and to promote the show, "personal appearance units", often including Foley, performed at state fairs and other venues in 42 states, Alaska (then a U.S. territory) and every Canadian province.

== Production ==
Ozark Jubilee's first broadcast was December 26, 1953 with an hour-long telecast from the studio of KYTV before a live audience, hosted by Bill Bailey. The two-and-a-half-hour radio version, hosted by Foley, began July 17, 1954 on KWTO from Springfield's 1,100-seat Jewell Theatre, a former movie theater. ABC Radio began carrying 30 minutes of the program August 7, and added another half-hour on a delayed basis on Tuesday nights starting October 5. The KYTV show followed with 90-minute TV simulcasts from the theater starting September 4, 1954.

Red Foley with producer-director Bryan Bisney and Fran Allison during a 1956 rehearsal

The program debuted on ABC-TV on January 22, 1955, but the first 14 national telecasts were staged at KOMU-TV in Columbia, Missouri because network television transmission capability from Springfield was not available. Columbia had a microwave transmitter, however, for ABC coverage of University of Missouri football games. After AT&T installed a microwave link in Springfield to transmit to Kansas City (which could feed to the network via Chicago), and modifications were made to the Jewell (including extending the stage and adding a control room), the program returned to the theater with the first broadcast April 30. The show was sent to KYTV by a local microwave link from the station's remote van. Rehearsals for Saturday shows were held on Fridays, with run-throughs Saturday afternoons.

The program used equipment and staff from KYTV, which was then a dual ABC-NBC network affiliate. It debuted using two black-and-white RCA TK-11 cameras with a third added a year later. Vocals of some hit songs were lip-synched. Overhead shots of square dancing and for other creative purposes were accomplished using a large mirror angled above the stage. One 1960 show included an elephant from a visiting Adams & Sells Circus quietly performing on stage behind an "oblivious" Uncle Cyp. The program had two remote broadcasts: June 22, 1957 from the Oklahoma State Fair during the state's semi-centennial; and February 21, 1959 from the Masonic Auditorium in Detroit, Michigan for a Massey Ferguson dealers convention.

In July 1957, Dan Lounsbery, producer of NBC's Your Hit Parade, and its art director, Paul Barnes, were hired by ABC to spend several weeks with the show to improve the sets and pacing. July 6 saw the first program under the name Country Music Jubilee, which, according to ABC Vice President James Aubry Jr., "recognizes the wide popularity of country music."

The Jubilee's executive producers were Crossroads vice presidents Si Siman and John Mahaffey, and the producer-director was Bryan "Walt" Bisney. The co-writers were publicist Don Richardson and Bob "Bevo" Tubert. Fred I. Rains was floor director and Bill Ring frequently served as associate producer. The original scenic designer was Don Sebring; his successor, Andy Miller, later did scenic design for nearby Silver Dollar City and Richardson became its public relations director.

== Five Star Jubilee ==
In 1961, NBC-TV carried a summer spin-off called Five Star Jubilee from March 17–September 22. Starting in May, it was the first network color television series to originate outside New York City or Hollywood. The weekly program featured five rotating hosts: Snooky Lanson, Tex Ritter, Jimmy Wakely, Carl Smith and Rex Allen. Produced from Springfield's Landers Theatre, it was similar to Jubilee USA and featured some of the same cast members, including Bobby Lord, the Promenaders and Slim Wilson's Jubilee Band. Barbara Mandrell made her network debut on the program.

== Legacy ==
After cancellation by ABC, live performances from the Jewell Theatre continued over KWTO-AM (with 15 minutes carried by NBC Radio on Saturday afternoons through 1961), and groups of cast members continued making personal appearances. The theater was demolished five months later in February 1961; a marker in Jubilee Park, dedicated in 1988, notes its location at 216 South Jefferson Ave. Cast and production crew members held reunions at the 1988 dedication, in October 1992, and in April 1999.

1960 opening title with Massey Ferguson logo

The Jubilee was culturally significant for giving millions of urban and suburban American viewers their first regular exposure to country music. As Webb Pierce told TV Guide in 1956, "Once upon a time, it was almost impossible to sell country music in a place like New York City. Nowadays, television takes us everywhere, and country music records and sheet music sell as well in large cities as anywhere else." In return, the Jubilee gave many of the biggest names in country music their first experiences performing on television.

The program also gave national exposure to a number of female country music pioneers, including Patsy Cline, Brenda Lee, Wanda Jackson, Jan Howard, Jean Shepard, Kitty Wells and Norma Jean; the show also featured a local African-American group, the Philharmonics. It represented the peak of Red Foley's career, who had been America's top country star since World War II and who remains one of the biggest-selling country artists of all time. Finally, the Jubilee in many ways laid the groundwork for neighboring Branson, Missouri to become America's top country music tourist destination.

The program was the subject of a 1993 book, Remembering the Ozark Jubilee; and in 2003, Ozarks Public Television released an hour-long documentary, Ozark Jubilee: A Living Legacy. Cast and crew gathered once again for its premiere at the Landers Theatre.

Streets in a residential neighborhood of nearby Nixa, Missouri include Ozark Jubilee Drive, Red Foley Court, Slim Wilson Boulevard, Bill Ring Court, Zed Tennis Street and Haworth Court.

== Missouri State University digitization project ==
More than sixty full or partial kinescopes of the program were preserved at the UCLA Film and Television Archive. Missouri State University's Meyer Library has partnered with the UCLA archives to digitize all viable episodes and post them on a dedicated YouTube channel. Digitizing each episode costs $2,500, and sponsorship opportunities are available. As of February 2023, more than 70 episodes or segments have been posted. Meyer Library also houses the Bryan T. E. Bisney Ozark Jubilee Collection of Bisney's logbooks, notes and photos.

== See also ==
- The Eddy Arnold Show
- Talent Varieties
