= Today on the Farm =

Today on the Farm is an American television program broadcast on NBC-TV from October 1, 1960, to December 26, 1961. Hosted by country musician Eddy Arnold, the weekly series includes a variety of features such as agricultural and farm news with Alex Dreier, Mal Hansen as a roving reporter, Carmelita Pope with women's features, and weather with Joe Slattery, who also served as announcer. Long-range weather forecasts were supplied by The Krick Organization.

Regular performers included Arnold (backed by the NBC house orchestra) and The Tall Timber Trio (composed of Slim Wilson, Speedy Haworth and Bob White). Guests, booked by Si Siman, included Betty Johnson, Tex Ritter, Minnie Pearl, Chet Atkins, Bobby Lord, Brenda Lee, Molly Bee, Skeeter Davis, June Carter, Johnny Horton, Robin Clark, Jim Reeves and The Collins Kids.

The show aired live from NBC's Chicago, Illinois studios from 6–6:30 a.m. Central Time on Saturday mornings for the Central and Eastern time zones, and was rebroadcast at 7 a.m. Mountain Time for the Mountain and Pacific time zones. Carried by 190 stations, it was believed to be the first sponsored coast-to-coast TV program aired at that hour on Saturdays (sponsored by Massey Ferguson).

Despite Today in its name, the series was produced not by NBC News but by Crossroads TV Productions based in Springfield, Missouri.
