= Talent Varieties =

- The set for Talent Varieties (November 1955)
- Genre: Talent show
- Directed by: Bryan T. Bisney
- Starring: Slim Wilson; The Tall Timber Trio
- Country of origin: United States
- Original language: English
- No. of seasons: 1 (summer)

Production
- Executive producers: Si Siman; John B. Mahaffey
- Producer: Bryan T. Bisney
- Camera setup: multi-camera
- Running time: 30 minutes
- Production company: Crossroads TV Productions

Original release
- Network: ABC-TV; ABC Radio
- Release: June 28 – November 1, 1955

Related
- Ozark Jubilee

Talent Varieties is a country music talent show on American television and radio in 1955 that featured performers hoping to achieve fame in the entertainment business.

Host Slim Wilson

The weekly ABC-TV program was a live half-hour summer replacement series hosted by Slim Wilson. Wilson introduced the amateur and professional talent, including music and comedy acts (many from the Ozarks); and his Tall Timber Trio, composed of Speedy Haworth (guitar), Bob White (upright bass) and Bryan "Doc" Martin (steel guitar) provided accompaniment. Auditions were handled by Bill Ring. The Westport Kids appeared July 12, and Buck Griffin appeared August 2.

The show aired on Tuesday nights from June 28–November 1. Its original time slot was 7:30–8 p.m. Eastern Time, replacing Cavalcade of America, but moved to 10–10:30 p.m. in September to briefly replace Break the Bank.

ABC Radio simulcast the program under the name Talent Round-Up from 7:30 p.m., as well as carrying an additional half-hour until 8:30.

The program originated from the Jewell Theatre in Springfield, Missouri, home to ABC's Ozark Jubilee; and was produced and directed by the Jubilee's Bryan Bisney, who took over from Ring in September.
