= Ralph D. Foster =

- Foster c. 1956

Background information
- Born: Ralph David Foster; April 25, 1893
- Origin: St. Joseph, Missouri, US
- Died: August 11, 1984 (aged 91)
- Genres: country music
- Occupation(s): radio station owner radio and TV program creator-producer
- Website: Ralph Foster biography

Ralph David Foster (April 25, 1893 – August 11, 1984) was an American broadcasting executive and philanthropist who created the framework for Springfield, Missouri, to challenge Nashville, Tennessee, as the nation's country music capital during the 1950s. His KWTO was a stepping-stone for many top country artists; and with his music businesses, led to creation of Ozark Jubilee, the first U.S. network television program to feature country's top stars.

== Biography ==
Foster was born April 25, 1893, in St. Joseph, Missouri. In 1924, at age 31, he set up a low-power AM radio station with his partner, Jerry Hall, in a corner of their Firestone dealership, Foster-Hall Tire Co., in St. Joseph. It began as a hobby, but as local businesses increasingly sought to advertise on the station, it became a full-time occupation. He increased its power and on June 30, 1926, it was licensed as KGBX on 1040 kHz. Foster built a new service station and glassed-in studios for the radio station a few blocks north. A singer himself, he and Hall performed on the station as The Radio Rubber Twins.

=== "Keep Watching the Ozarks" ===
In 1932 Hall moved to California, and Foster and his brother-in-law, Art Johnson, relocated the station to Springfield under the direction and partnership of local businessman Lester E. Cox (KGBX-AM was licensed for 1310 kHz on November 3). Unable to get its transmitting power increased, the next year he bought the license of a station in Grant City and moved it to Springfield, signing on December 25, 1933, on 560 kHz. KWTO was founded by Cox and began broadcasting on December 25, 1933. Cox applied for and got the call sign KWTO, which stands for "Keep Watching The Ozarks." As president and general manager, Foster made KWTO-AM the dominant station in the region. In 1944, KGBX-AM (operating by then on 1260 kHz) was sold under new FCC ownership rules.

Foster began to realize radio's full potential after World War II. The Assembly of God, with national headquarters in Springfield, sponsored a 30-minute program on KWTO called Sermons in Song. He began transcribing the show for other stations, and eventually 200 carried the program. To expand his business into country music, Foster started RadiOzark Enterprises, Inc. with Si Siman as vice president and Cox as a financial backer. They produced transcription disks of programs starring Smiley Burnette, George Morgan, Bill Ring and Tennessee Ernie Ford (Ring was producer for 260 15-minute episodes of The Tennessee Ernie Show), and ABC Radio picked up Ring's show, sponsored by General Mills. Eventually, more than 1,200 U.S. and Canadian stations aired their programs.

Live broadcasts, however, dominated KWTO's programming. Many country music stars either got their start or performed on the station, including Porter Wagoner, Chet Atkins, the Carter Family, The Browns, Wynn Stewart, Les Paul, Homer and Jethro, and Slim Wilson. Korn’s-A-Krackin’, a weekly “hillbilly variety” program, was carried nationally by the Mutual radio network.

=== Crossroads of country music ===
Foster believed Springfield might overtake Nashville, Tennessee, to become the "crossroads of country music," and knew his best opportunity would be to put his local TV show, Ozark Jubilee, on national television. He named his new enterprise Crossroads TV Productions, Inc., with Siman and Foster's nephew, John B. Mahaffey, as managing vice presidents and KWTO commercial manager Leslie I. Kennon as vice president.

In April 1954, Siman lured Red Foley, considered America's top country music star, from Nashville with the promise of hosting a national TV program. Foster leased the Jewell Theatre and spent nearly $100,000 to outfit it for live TV production. On January 22, 1955, Ozark Jubilee debuted on ABC-TV, the first network television series featuring national country music stars, which ran for almost six years. Known by the cast and crew as "the Skipper," Foster made his only appearance on its final telecast (by then renamed Jubilee USA) on September 24, 1960, singing "Woodman, Spare That Tree".

Crossroads TV also produced the show's spin-off, NBC-TV's Five Star Jubilee (1961); as well as The Eddy Arnold Show (1956) and Talent Varieties (1955), both ABC. From 1960–1961, the company produced Today on the Farm for NBC from Chicago.

The networks, however, passed on two other efforts to expand programming from Springfield: early in 1957, Crossroads produced a pilot for a proposed ABC-TV series called Pig 'N Poke, a quiz show (popular at the time) with a country theme hosted by Smiley Burnette; and in January 1960, Crossroads videotaped a pilot for a pop-variety TV series, Snooky Lanson Time. Guests were Brenda Lee, the Anita Kerr Singers, Betty Ann Grove and Paul Mitchell's instrumental combo.

To represent the regular performers on KWTO and the Jubilee, Foster established Top Talent, Inc. (under general manager W.E. "Lucky" Moeller); and to publish their compositions, he founded Earl Barton Music, Inc. in partnership with Si Siman, John Mahaffey and Lester E. Cox, originally headed by C.R. "Lou" Black, KWTO's program director, who was succeeded after his death in 1956 by Moeller. Crossroads also sold outdoor advertising. The combined companies grossed $2.5 million annually.

=== Later years ===
In 1963, Foster, Siman and Mahaffey formed Tele-Color, Inc., which in 1964 filmed color segments for ABC's Wide World of Sports and other programs.

Foster was a member of the board of directors for the Ozark Empire Fair in Springfield for more than 20 years and was involved in many other civic activities. He died August 11, 1984, in Springfield and was buried in St. Joseph Memorial Park Cemetery. His widow, Harriett, died December 5, 1986.

== Ralph Foster Museum ==
Foster was an avid hunter and fisherman and a strong conservationist. He collected Native American and Western artifacts and firearms for many years, and in the 1960s donated a large collection to the museum at The School of the Ozarks (now College of the Ozarks) in Point Lookout, Missouri, near Branson. In 1969, Foster's financial donations saw to the addition of a new wing, a new entrance, and a new name: the Ralph Foster Museum.

The museum's focus is the history and culture of the Ozarks region. Exhibits include the original vehicle used in the television series The Beverly Hillbillies, antiques, weapons, dolls, circus toys and miniature model circus, metal banks and toys, furniture and household items, glassware, natural history, mounted animal displays, personal hobby collections and a display on Ozark music personalities.
