= Foggy River Boys =

The Foggy River Boys was the name of two related American male singing quartets from southern Missouri specializing in Southern gospel, spiritual, and country music in the 1940s and 1950s.

== 1940s group ==
The original Foggy River Boys traced their lineage to the early 1940s, when Bill and Monty Matthews, joined by their brothers Jack and Matt, formed the Matthews Brothers in Poplar Bluff, Missouri. All were ordained ministers for Disciples of Christ. They had two daily live shows on KWTO-AM in Springfield, Missouri.

In 1947, they appeared with Red Foley on The Prince Albert Show, the nationally broadcast portion of the Grand Ole Opry in Nashville, Tennessee. Matt and Jack left in 1948 to become full-time preachers, and were replaced by Bob Hubbard, also a minister, and bass singer Cully Holt. They first called the new group the Melodizing Matthews, but changed the name to The Jordanaires, after the Jordan Creek in Springfield, Missouri. They signed with RCA Records, and recorded secular music under the name The Foggy River Boys (after a nickname for the Cumberland River). In 1952, piano player Gordon Stoker replaced Bill Matthews as first tenor, Hoyt Hawkins replaced Hubbard and Neal Matthews Jr. (no relation) replaced Monty Matthews, forming the version of the Jordanaires who went on to back Elvis Presley.

== 1950s group ==
The second iteration of The Foggy River Boys formed in Springfield about 1954 with Charlie Hutton as lead vocalist, with brothers Bill and Monty Matthews, Warren Holmes as bass vocalist, and Bill Hedrick as piano accompanist. By the end of the first season on the Ozark Jubilee, Charlie Hodge had replaced Charlie Hutton, Don Taylor had replaced Warren Holmes, and Newman Miller had replaced Bill Hedrick at piano. Hodge was replaced by George Richardson in 1958. They were signed to Decca Records and also recorded on the Mercury, Starday, and Foremost Records labels. They backed Fess Parker, Homer and Jethro, Red Foley, and Bobby Lord.

Les Roberson, replacing Monty Matthews, joined in 1957. That year, they changed their name to The Marksmen, which by then consisted of Roberson (baritone), Richardson (lead), Earl Terry (tenor), and Don Taylor (bass). Robertson, Richardson and Terry were from Los Angeles; Taylor was from Lakeland, Florida. They were regulars on ABC-TV's Ozark Jubilee from 1955 to 1960, and also appeared on The Eddy Arnold Show in 1956 and NBC's Five Star Jubilee in 1961. In May 1957, they performed on NBC-TV's Tennessee Ernie Ford Show and Cliffie Stone's Hometown Jamboree in Los Angeles.
