= Lennie Aleshire =

American singer-songwriter

- Aleshire at WMMN-AM in 1939

Background information
- Birth name: Leonard Harrison Aleshire
- Also known as: The One Finger Fiddler
- Born: April 27, 1890
- Origin: Christian County, Missouri, USA
- Died: October 15, 1987 (aged 97)
- Genres: vaudeville, country music
- Occupation(s): singer, musician, songwriter, dancer, comedian
- Instrument(s): fiddle, guitar, banjo, cowbells
- Labels: RCA Victor
- Formerly of: The Weaver Brothers and Elviry

Leonard Harrison Aleshire (April 27, 1890 – October 15, 1987) was a versatile American vaudeville and later country music performer from the 1920s into the 1960s. A singer, dancer and songwriter, he was also half of a musical comedy duo, Lennie and Goo Goo, with Floyd Rutledge. The pair appeared on local and national radio and television programs originating from Springfield, Missouri, during the 1940s and 50s.

== Biography ==
=== Early years ===
Lennie Aleshire was born April 27, 1890, in Christian County, Missouri, just south of Springfield. He was playing the fiddle by age six and learned the guitar, banjo and other instruments by ear. At 15, he lived with the Creek Indians near Broken Arrow, Oklahoma, though his mother was half Cherokee. After his parents died, he lived with his brother and sister near Dadeville. Aleshire and his brother John played the fiddle; their sister Linda played guitar. The Aleshire Trio staged their first vaudeville shows at a local silent movie theater with Aleshire sometimes performing in blackface.

In 1917, Aleshire was drafted for service in World War I, but was excused because he had lost three fingers on his left hand in a sawmill accident, which led to his nickname, the One Finger Fiddler. He worked for a Kansas City saddlery, a railroad, and played professional baseball for three seasons; but returned to vaudeville, writing the song "Nixa Fling" after working as a boiler engineer at a Nixa, Missouri, cheese factory in 1926, the same year he met his wife, Mae.

Aleshire had a varied vaudeville career: he joined McMae Hill, and the troupe of magician and ventriloquist Professor Sage; and spent two years with the Cauble Brothers Circus traveling through the Midwest. He also appeared with Argentinean magician Dawes the Great, performed as a tap dancer, and toured Oklahoma with saxophonist Roy Wrightsman.

=== Lennie and Goo Goo ===
Aleshire first teamed up with his boyhood friend from Springfield, Floyd Rutledge, in the early 1920s. They developed a hillbilly musical comedy routine, playing traditional as well their homemade instruments which included cowbells strapped to their shoes. The pair toured with the Orpheum Circuit and played at the Palace Theatre in New York City. Aleshire also worked the Bert Levy West Coast vaudeville circuit. In 1928, they joined The Weaver Brothers and Elviry act, based in Springfield, and eventually became known as Lennie and Goo Goo. Aleshire served as straight man for Rutledge's slow-witted Goo Goo.

Aleshire was also a songwriter; his tune "Iva Waltz" was named for his daughter. His "My Old Saddle Pal" was sung by Gene Autry in his 1936 film, The Singing Cowboy. Aleshire also wrote "Sleepy Time Waltz", "Ozark Waltz", "Blackberry Jam" and "Ukulele Melody". In 1939 he co-wrote "Prairie Reveries" with Buddy Starcher.

Aleshire (right) with Floyd Rutledge as Lennie and Goo Goo on Ozark Jubilee, 1955

In 1937, Aleshire joined WWVA-AM's Mountaineer Jamboree in Wheeling, West Virginia, and worked with banjo player Dale Parker as part of the Rhythm Rangers for about a year. He later worked at WLW-AM in Cincinnati, Ohio; and in 1939 at WMMN-AM in Fairmont, West Virginia, where he and Rutledge became close friends with Louis "Grandpa" Jones. Jones formed an act called Grandpa Jones and his Grandsons consisting of Aleshire, Loren Bledsoe and Harold Rensler. Aleshire and Rutledge introduced Jones and Ramona Riggins to cowbells, which they adopted.

The duo returned to Springfield in the early 1940s and appeared on KGBX-AM, and Aleshire toured with Jones. In August 1944, Aleshire, Rutledge and Parker joined KWTO-AM in Springfield and were featured on Korn's-A-Krackin', carried nationally by Mutual Radio, and other shows. When KYTV-TV's Ozark Jubilee moved to ABC in 1955, Aleshire and Rutledge went along as Lennie and Goo Goo and were mainstays on the program for more than five years.

In 1955, RCA Victor released "Ridin' The Fiddle" featuring Aleshire and Parker with King Ganam and His Sons of the West.

=== Later years ===
When Ozark Jubilee was canceled in 1960 (by then renamed Jubilee USA), Aleshire and Rutledge retired in Springfield but continued to perform; Aleshire also worked as an expert piano tuner and Rutledge, who years earlier had briefly been a local policeman, was a taxi driver (he died at age 64 in 1970). Aleshire and wife Mae had one son, Kenneth Chessnut; and daughter Iva.

Aleshire died in Springfield, Missouri, on October 15, 1987, at age 97 and was interred in Palmetto Cemetery in Greene County. His widow, Mae, died September 7, 1996.

Several of Aleshire's and Rutledge's homemade instruments are displayed at the Ralph Foster Museum at the College of the Ozarks in Point Lookout, Missouri, near Branson.
