= Slim Wilson =

American singer-songwriter (1910-1990)

- Wilson c. 1955

Background information
- Also known as: Slim Pickens Wilson
- Born: Clyde Carol Wilson; July 14, 1910
- Origin: Christian County, Missouri, USA
- Died: July 15, 1990 (aged 80) Springfield, Missouri
- Genres: country music
- Occupations: singer, songwriter, musician, bandleader, radio and TV personality
- Instrument: guitar
- Years active: 1932–1990
- Labels: Rocket; Universal
- Formerly of: The Tall Timber Trio; Flash and Whistler; Jubilee Band

Clyde Carol Wilson (July 14, 1910 – July 15, 1990), better known as Slim Wilson, was an American singer, songwriter, bandleader, and radio and TV personality who was a cornerstone of country music in the Ozarks for more than 50 years beginning in the 1930s; both in his own right, and as a member of The Goodwill Family and The Tall Timber Trio. Wilson was a mainstay of ABC-TV’s Ozark Jubilee; and hosted ABC's Talent Varieties in 1955 and his own local television show in Springfield, Missouri, from 1964 to 1975.

== Biography ==
=== Early years ===
Wilson was born in Christian County, Missouri, just south of Nixa to John C. Wilson and Arlena J. Wilson (née Goddard), who had come to Missouri in a covered wagon from the hills of Tennessee. He was the family's first son after six daughters: Cassie, Carrie, Edna, Bertha, Myrtle, and Vancie Martha. The entire family was known for being musical. Wilson attended schools in Harmony, Rosedale and Line, then rode horseback to high school in Nixa.

About 1930, his father rented a house on the family's ranch to the Hancock family from South Dakota. A year later, Wilson married Ada Hancock. By 1934, he was raising dairy and beef cattle on 150 acres (60.7 hectares) north of Bolivar, Missouri, on the Pomme de Terre River. His father bought the adjoining parcel.

The Wilson family’s musicians would sometimes perform “together" using a telephone party line. Ten to 15 families could listen in, and neighbors would eavesdrop on the sessions for entertainment, often placing the earpiece in a bucket for amplification. Wilson soon won second place in a local fiddle competition.

=== Radio career ===
Wilson formed The Goodwill Trio as "Uncle Slim" with his sister Vancie as "Aunt Martha" and her son, Herschel "Junior" Haworth. The trio first appeared on KGBX in Springfield in 1932; but moved to co-owned KWTO, the more powerful station, soon after it signed on in 1933. The group made its first public appearance in 1936 at the county courthouse in Galena as a fundraiser to treat their father's broken leg. The trio later became The Goodwill Family when Guy Smith joined them as "Uncle George."

Unable to afford a car, Wilson hitchhiked to KWTO to appear with Zed Tennis; and later, with Si Perkins and Smokey Lohman. He was a part of many artist combinations on the station, including Slim and Shorty (a Nixa neighbor); and The Tall Timber Trio, with Haworth on guitar and Bob White on bass fiddle. He was also "Whistler" of Flash and Whistler (with Floyd "Goo Goo" Rutledge), a music-comedy duo. The station, heard across the Ozarks, was a stepping-stone during Wilson's years for such musicians as Porter Wagoner, Les Paul, Chet Atkins and The Browns.

Wilson was responsible for giving Wesley West his nickname: he introduced West to the audience as "Speedy" West at a pie social and jam session sponsored by KWTO. He worked briefly at radio stations in Cedar Rapids, Iowa and Denver, Colorado before returning to the Ozarks. By the early 1950s, Wilson was among the top performers on KWTO, hosting the morning show sponsored by Martha White Flour (one advertiser created a Goodwill Family Flour brand). By 1954, he had done his 25,000th broadcast on the station. He also appeared on Red Foley’s network radio programs.

=== Recording career ===
Wilson recorded numerous transcriptions in the 1940s and 1950s but few commercial cuts. He recorded songs on Universal in 1948; and Cattle Records released an LP, Slim Pickens Wilson–The Idol Of The Ozarks (Cattle 121), featuring Rutledge. The Goodwill Family recorded 250 transcriptions for airing on KWTO when they toured.

Wilson appeared on such RadiOzark Transcriptions as The Red Foley Show. Rocket Records released a Wilson 45 single, "The Shepherd Of The Hills" b/w "God Walk These Ozark Hills" (Rocket 103). He also appeared on the albums Christmas RFD (Sony 1991) and Christmas in the Country (United Multimedia, 1994).

=== TV career ===
In 1955, Wilson became a featured cast member on Ozark Jubilee for its nearly six-year run on ABC-TV, and was also a fill-in host for Red Foley. He was a versatile performer on the show, serving as the front man for both the Tall Timber Trio (sometimes known as the Tall Timber Boys), then made up of Herschel "Speedy" Haworth, White, and "Doc" Martin (steel guitar); and the Jubilee Band, composed of Haworth, Martin, White, Johnny Gailey (drums), Paul Mitchell (piano) and Zed Tennis (fiddle). He and Rutledge also teamed up again as Flash and Whistler. On the November 7, 1959, show, Wilson sang "Let's Go to Church" as a duet with Patsy Cline. In the summer of 1955, he hosted his own ABC program, Talent Varieties. Wilson also appeared on NBC-TV’s Five Star Jubilee in 1961, and performed with the Tall Timber Trio on NBC-TV's Today on the Farm from 1960–61.

He hosted The Slim Wilson Show from the studios of Springfield’s KYTV-TV from 1964 to 1975. The hour-long country music variety series aired on Saturdays from 6–7 p.m. CT and featured The Tall Timber Trio, joined by Roger Blevins (steel guitar) and Buster Fellows (fiddle) to comprise the Tall Timber Band; The Goodwill Family; and the Promenaders square dancing group with their caller, L.D. Keller. Haworth’s daughter, Shirley Jean, also appeared, along with other local entertainers. By 1966 it was telecast in color.

In July 1967, Country Music Carousel featuring Wilson was videotaped at KYTV, produced by Hal Smith Television Programs of Nashville, Tennessee. Sixteen 30-minute shows were taped in two nights; the program was unsuccessful.

Wilson had a small role as Man No. 1 in the "Silver Dollar City Fair" episode of The Beverly Hillbillies on CBS-TV, first aired on October 8, 1969.

=== Personal and death ===
Slim and Ada Wilson had one son, John Wesley Wilson, who was also a musician. Wilson enjoyed bowling, fishing and quail hunting and traveled to South Dakota annually in the 1960s to hunt pheasant. He owned a cabin on Table Rock Lake.

Wilson died July 15, 1990, in Springfield (a day after his 80th birthday) and is buried in Eastlawn Cemetery there.

== Legacy ==
Wilson's December 1936 recording of "The Little Old Sod Shanty On The Claim" is part of the Traditional Music and Spoken Word Catalog of the American Folklife Center at the Library of Congress.

Slim Wilson Boulevard is among several streets in a residential neighborhood northeast of downtown Nixa named for performers on Ozark Jubilee, including Red Foley Court, Zed Tennis Street, Haworth Court and Ozark Jubilee Drive.

=== Muppet character ===
Slim Wilson is the name of the guitar player in the Muppet country band, Lubbock Lou and his Jughuggers. Usually performed by Jerry Nelson, the character first appeared in episode 2.08 of The Muppet Show and was the lead singer and sang duets with Lou. Wilson received his name in episode 3.22 in a rodeo sketch.
