= Mighty Haag Circus =

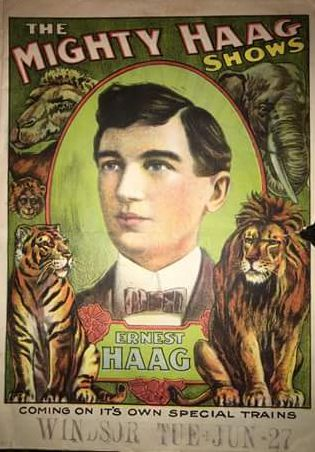
Ernest Haag poster, June 27, 1911

Mighty Haag Circus was started by American entrepreneur Ernest Haag (17 June 1866 - 1 Feb. 1935) in Shreveport, Louisiana. His circus toured continuously for over 40 years, from 1891 to 1938. During these years, the circus used a variety of types of transport: boat, carts, trains, horse-pulled wagons, and trucks. It was one of the largest traveling circuses in the United States.

Many Haag performers had successful careers elsewhere after working in the Haag Circus. Harry James (1916–1983) grew up in the Mighty Haag Circus; his father, Everett Robert James, was its bandleader. Harry James' mother, Myrtle Maybelle (Stewart), was an acrobat and horseback rider in the Circus. Maybelle and Everett James gave their son Harry the middle name of Haag after the circus owner. The James family departed the Circus in 1931 when Harry was 15.

Other notable circus alumni include the following: Laurence Brasfield, of Uncle Cyp and Aunt Sap Brasfield, started in the Haag Circus at age 14. Cornet player Don Essig played in Haag Circus. Starting as Haag performers, Rube Walters and Heinie Emgard became a vaudeville act. Fisher's Performing Elephants continued tours after the Haag Circus ended. Ruby Haag Brown performed for 50 years in the Haag Circus, the Ringling Bros. and Barnum & Bailey Circus, the Circus Hall of Fame and Shrine Circus.

== Beginnings ==
Ernest Haag was born in Plymouth, Indiana in 1866 to German immigrants Joseph N. Haag (July 8, 1840 - 1904), born in Bavaria (Bayern), and Elizabeth (Schoner) Haag (April 1840 – 1906), also born in Germany (probably also from Bavaria, a major source of immigrants in this period.)

Haag was said to have run away from home and farm life at age 12 to join a circus. He traveled to Philadelphia and New York City, where he worked shining shoes and selling newspapers. He first got a job as a musician, playing alto in the short-lived Robinson Two-Car Show. He started a juice business. From Philadelphia he traveled south, converting his juice business into a minstrel show, which failed. After purchasing a small tent from a longtime side-show man, Squire Bowman, Haag produced a side show at the local fair grounds.

In 1890, at the age of 24, Haag purchased a flat-bottomed boat to anchor in the Red River near Shreveport, Louisiana. He used the flatboat as a performing stage for his show, hiring local performers and calling it "The Big Show". Ed Conklin, a local juggler, was one of first performers. In 1895 he renamed the show as the Mighty Haag Shows.

Haag moved the show down the Catawba River to Bayou Teche. From there he moved it down the Atchafalaya River, tying up near Morgan City, Louisiana. At Morgan City Haag moved his show onto carts and later and wagons, and began touring overland. Haag added more carts and wagons to carry the expanded show as he toured Louisiana and Kansas.

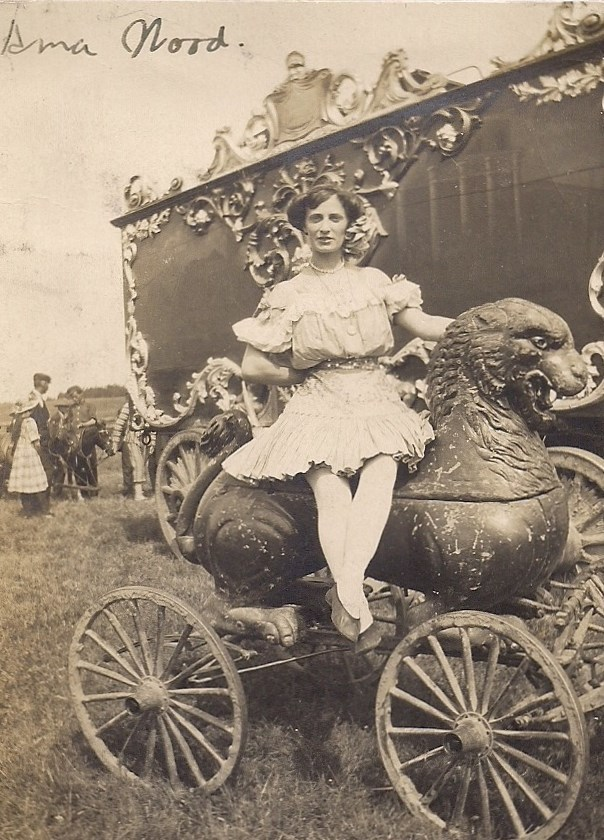
Mighty Haag Circus in 1912

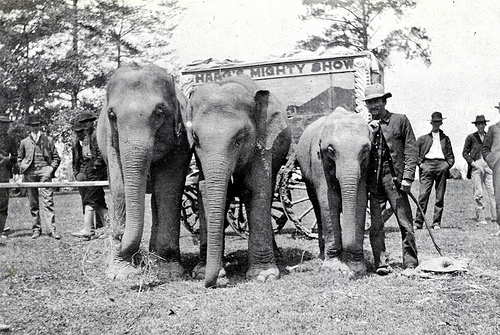
Mighty Haag Circus elephants: Tip, Alice and Babe in 1913. Tip and Alice worked in the Circus for more than 30 years. Alice would pick up Ruby Haag in her mouth

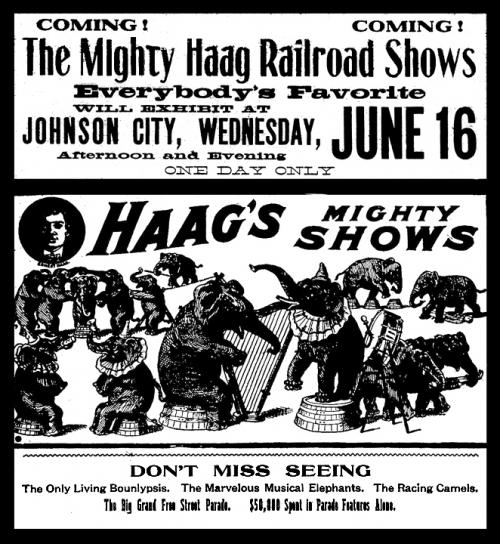
June 1909: a newspaper ad for the Mighty Haag Railroad Shows, appearing in Johnson City, near Spartanburg, South Carolina

== Mighty Haag Circus ==
For a decade the Mighty Haag Shows toured Mississippi, Tennessee and Kentucky and others in the Southern United States. In 1909 the Circus had outgrown the horse and mule-pulled wagons. Haag moved his Circus to 14 railroad cars, calling his production the Mighty Haag Railroad Shows. Carved wagons, cages for animals, Pawnee Bill calliope wagons, and chariots were all placed in rail cars.

The Mighty Haag Railroad Shows toured from 1910 to 1912 in Eastern Canada including: Ontario, Quebec, New Brunswick, Nova Scotia and Prince Edward Island, including Charlottetown. It toured US states as far west as Montana. Its animal acts included elephants, bears, ponies, camels, lions, tiger and blue-faced monkeys, along with a hyena, ocelot and badger. A Tuckapo ponies act was put on by Capt. J. C. Farley.

In 1915 the Circus entrance fee was 35 cents. At the show's peak in 1918, it had 100 workers, to produce a three-ring circus in a 180' by 80' tent. Its 45 vehicles were of all types. Featured acts were the one-legged clown, Roy Fortune; a highwire walker and aerialist; and the sword swallower Marguerite Davis.

In 1915 Haag sold all his railroad cars to the Great Wortham Shows carnival and moved back to wagons, renaming the show as the Mighty Haag Circus. The wagons toured locally in Louisiana and Texas. In the early 1930s, with good roads and trucks now available, Haag moved his Circus and tents to trucks for transport. The elephants were used to help with stuck trucks. Mighty Haag Circus wintered first in Lecompte, Louisiana and then in Shreveport. With the success of the Circus, Haag had a home built for him and his family in Shreveport. In 1920 the Circus moved to winter quarters in Marianna, Florida.

Ruby Haag Brown, daughter of the late Charles William Fisher and Ruth Eleanor Gregory, was a performer in the show. She is known for being picked up in the mouth of Alice the elephant, who carried the woman around the ring. Ruby also did aerial acts in the show. She was married for 29 years to Harry Eugene Haag Sr.

After Ernest Haag's death on 1 Feb. 1935, the operation of the Circus was passed on to family members. For the summer of 1936, Harry Haag, Ruby Haag and the Fisher family, using primarily horses and trained dogs, opened the Bud Hawkins Circus.

In January 1937, the name of the main Haag Circus was changed to the Haag Brothers Circus. The "brothers" were cousins, Henry Haag, son of Ernest, and Roy Haag (23 Nov. 1891-6 Jan. 1947), nephew of Ernest. The Circus' last show was in 1939 in Climax, Georgia.

After the Circus officially closed, Harry Haag, and the Silverlake and Fisher families took Alice, the elephant, and a few other acts. They produced an independent show for one year, called United Amusement Company.

Haag married the former Alice N. Hubbard (1879- 1951). Their son Harry Eugene was born while they were on tour in Oklahoma, and later their daughter Helen was born. Haag purchased real estate in Louisiana, Florida and Oklahoma. He was also selected as a director of the Commercial National Bank of Shreveport.

== Notable performers, acts and employees ==
- Ernest Haag - circus founder and owner
- Alice Haag - Haag's wife, who was sales - manager
- Harry E. Haag Sr. - son of the Haags; inherited part of circus
- Helen Haag (Durrett) - daughter of the Haags; she appeared in an elephant act, and was the first woman to be picked up by elephant trunk)
- Ruby Fisher Haag - acrobat and aerialist, elephant trainer; joined in 1928 (married Harry Haag Sr)
- Roy Haag - Sales, manager and later co-owner with cousin Harry after Ernest's death
- Henry Eugene Haag - sales, manager - manager of the Haag Brothers Circus (what relation?)
- Harry Haag Jr. - horse trainer
- Naomi Haag (Carpenter) - elephant, pony and dog acts [Harry E. & Ruby's daughter]
- Charles Ernest "Doc" Haag - elephant trainer [Harry E. & Ruby's son]
- Ed Conklin - juggler and first performer hired
- Everett James - band leader
- Myrtle Maybelle (Stewart) James - acrobat and horseback rider
- Fisher Family (they joined the circus in 1928):
  - Josephine "Jo" Helen (Fisher) Silverlake - acrobat and aerialist, trick riding (later married Brownie Silverlake)
  - Sarah Mann Fisher, known as "Tootsie" - acrobat and aerialist
  - Ruth Eleanor Fisher - acrobat and aerialist
- Arthur Gregory Fisher - brother to the Fisher sisters, acrobat and aerialist
- Doc Charles Fisher - veterinarian, and elephant and dog trainer
- Silverlake Trio: (Silverlakes aerialists - Flying Silverlake) [Timberlake]
  - Archie Silverlake - aerialist, joined 1928
  - Brownie (Melvin) Silverlake - aerialist, joined 1928
  - Billy Silverlake - aerialist, joins 1928
  - Marcus Silverlake - bareback rider
  - Franklin Silverlake - trapeze
  - Myrna Silverlake - swinging ladder
  - Melvin "Col Mel" Silverlake - rope spinning, whip, gunspinning(Archie's son)
  - Jimmy Silverlake - elephant trainer
  - Joe Silverlake - juggler
- Lulu Del-Fuego (Mrs. Frank Foignet) - side show, tattooed lady
- Ezra Joseph 'Corine' Smith (Hazel) - elephant trainer
- Albert Armor - riding master
- Amores - Impalement arts
- Fennell - tightrope
- The four Alvedo Bros. - aerial bars
- Billy Burton, Roy Barrett, Col. Billy Barlow - clown
- The six De Ivey Troupe, Hodge's Troupe & Matsomoto Troupe, - acrobats
- Fred De Ivey - side show
- Ray Forbes and Roy Fortune; Millie Blondine Irwin & Mlle. Blanc, Bert Deare - wire and rings
- DeMarlo, also labeled as "The Great DeMarlo"- balancing act, world's greatest grotesque artist
- Irene James and Mickey O'Brien - wire & trapeze
- Harry Rhodes - band leader
- The Linsleys - pantomimists and comedy acrobats
- Ned Bottinere - magician
- Mrs. Bottinere - Indian princes [Go-Won-Mo-Hawk]
- Blacky performing lions
- Kitty May Irwin & W.H. Whitlark, Ann Woods - contortionist
- Wm. J. Irwin and Frank Smith - double head balancing trapeze
- Trip Triplett - comedian
- Spider" Mardello - equestrian director
- Doc Grant - jester
- Chas. Duncan - elephant trainer
- Larkin's Troupe - jugglers and wire artists
- The Parentos - novelty acrobats and contortionists
- Mr. and Mrs. Willie C. Clark - foot jugglers and trapeze
- Capt. Pete Loftus - lion act
- Frenchie Miller - horses and phony show
- Earl Moss, Prof Harry Rhoods and Don Essig - bandleader
- George and Georgie - trampoline act
- The Johnsons- aerialists and foot jugglers
- Ab Johnson, C. W. Denney, Al Armer, Roy Forum, C. W. Denney, Frenchie Miller - clown
- Miss Marion Drew- herd of performing elephants
- Miss Drew - clown and juggling act
- Three Moralis Girls - iron jaw
- The Three Georges- acrobats and gymnasts supreme, 60 somersaults in 60 seconds
- Geo and Geo and Mrs. Fern, Tan and Carrie Arakis - revolving ladder
- James O'Neill and Renee Jenelle - acrobats
- LeRoy's performing elephants
- Mrs. Della Larkins, "Curly" Womick - calliope player.
- Fisher's Performing Elephants (Alice and Judy)
  - Alice the Elephant (in show from 1914 to 1942)
  - Tip the Elephant
  - Judy the Elephant (near the end of the shows)
- Babe, Tony and Trilby, the elephants (early shows)
- Dewey, Duke and Major, the riding dogs
- Despot, the small horse, 19 inches high and 26 pounds

== See also ==
- Ringling Brothers Circus
- Ringling Bros. and Barnum & Bailey Circus
- The Greatest Show on Earth (film)
