= Snooky Lanson =

American singer (1914–1990)

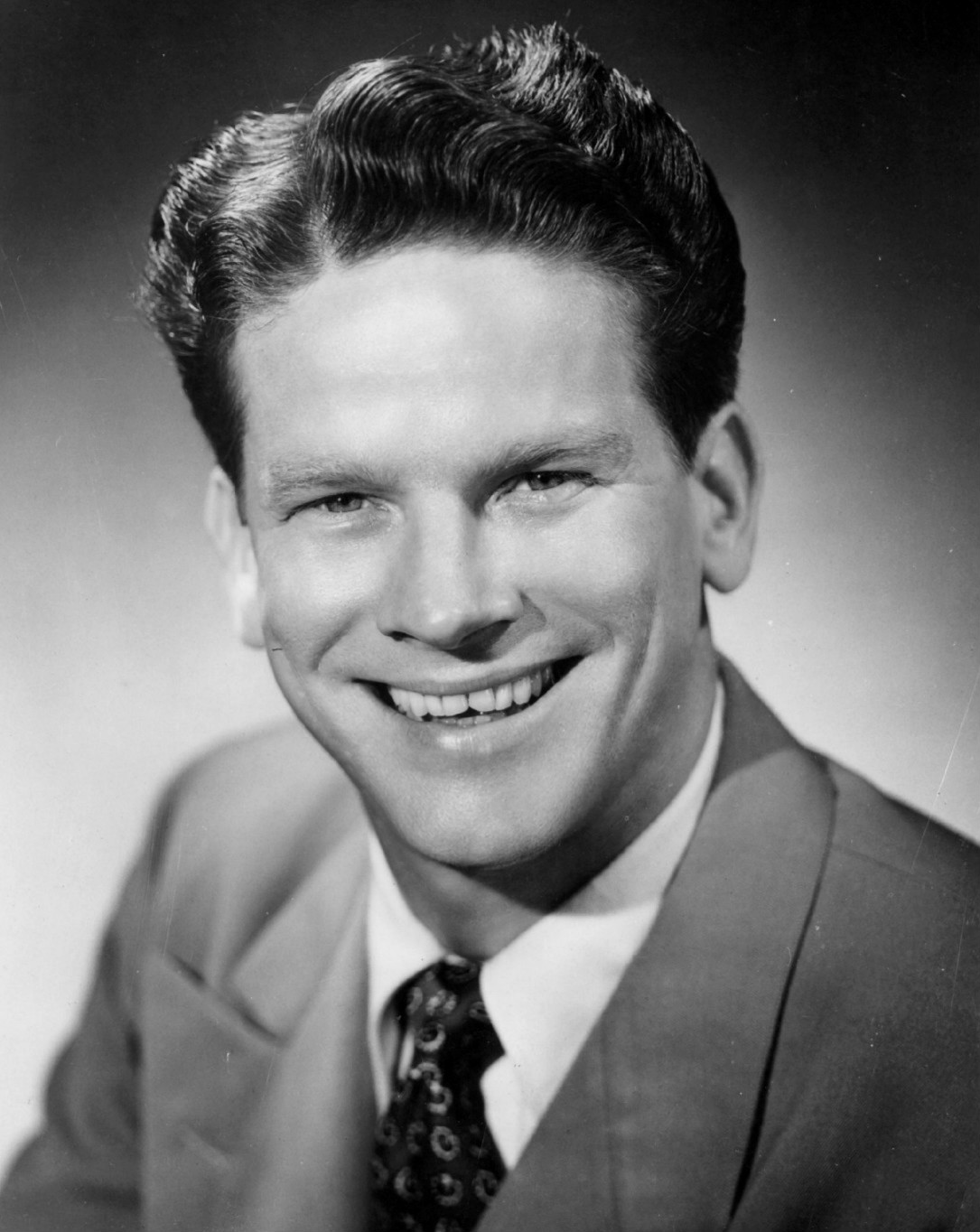
- Lanson c. 1940s
- Born: Roy Landman; March 27, 1914; Memphis, Tennessee, U.S.
- Died: July 2, 1990 (aged 76); New York City, U.S.
- Occupation: Vocalist

Roy Landman (March 27, 1914 – July 2, 1990), better known as Snooky Lanson, was an American singer known for co-starring on the NBC radio program and TV show, Your Hit Parade.

== Life ==
Born in Memphis, Tennessee, Lanson was a band singer with Francis Craig's dance band in the late 1930s. He became a singing star when major bandleader Ray Noble hired him as his orchestra's "boy singer"; Noble and Lanson appear together in three Soundies musical films produced in 1941. Lanson made additional Soundies as a solo artist in 1944.

On radio, Lanson was featured on Appointment with Music, The Saturday Showcase, and Sunday Night Serenade.

NBC's popular Your Hit Parade radio programs featured Frank Sinatra, who left the series in 1950. Snooky Lanson was chosen to replace him, and Lanson became one of America's first TV stars when Your Hit Parade came to television in July 1950. Lanson remained with the series through 1957. Floor manager (and future children's television host) Fred Rogers said that Lanson often played craps behind the set with the stagehands until it was his turn to perform.

In 1956, Lanson starred in The Snooky Lanson Show, a variety program on NBC-TV.

After Hit Parade ended, he performed in nightclubs and on local television shows in Atlanta and Shreveport, Louisiana. He guest-starred in 1958 on The Gisele MacKenzie Show, MacKenzie having been a co-star with Lanson on Hit Parade. In 1961, he was one of five rotating hosts on the NBC-TV program Five Star Jubilee.

In January 1960, Crossroads TV Productions videotaped a pilot in Springfield, Missouri for a proposed pop music-variety series called Snooky Lanson Time. Guests were Brenda Lee, the Anita Kerr Singers, Betty Ann Grove and Paul Mitchell's instrumental combo. From 1967 on he lived in Nashville, where he sang at tea dances and similar functions, had a syndicated radio show that played big-band music, and sold cars and outdoor advertising. He later reunited with several of his Your Hit Parade co-stars on Family Feud, as part of a 1983 celebrity week saluting "TV's All-Time Favorites".

Lanson died on July 2, 1990 at age 76 in New York. He was survived by his widow, Florence, a daughter, two sons, and eight grandchildren.
