= Don Warden =

- Born: March 27, 1929; Mountain Grove, Missouri, US
- Died: March 11, 2017 (aged 87)
- Genres: Country music
- Occupations: Musician, business manager
- Instrument: Steel guitar
- Years active: 1950s–2000s
- Website: Don Warden Music

Don Warden (March 27, 1929 – March 11, 2017) was an American country music steel guitarist and manager best known for his years on The Porter Wagoner Show and as the manager of Wagoner and Dolly Parton.

== Biography ==
=== Early life ===
Born to Reverend and Mrs. Charles Warden in Mt. Grove, Missouri, Warden grew up singing in church. A self-taught player, he was influenced by Leon McAuliffe with Bob Wills and The Texas Playboys. Warden formed his own band during high school, The Rhythm Rangers, playing steel guitar and singing. He also had an afternoon radio show on KWPM-AM in West Plains, Missouri. The band gained popularity, moving on to Kennett, Missouri's KBOA-AM and KHWN-AM in Fort Smith, Arkansas, and gigs in East Texas honky tonks; eventually leading to Louisiana Hayride, backing The Wilburn Brothers and Red Sovine. Warden left the show in 1951 for a two-year stint with the US Army.

Returning to the Hayride after the Army, the Rhythm Rangers continued to back Red Sovine until Sovine left to join the Grand Ole Opry in Nashville, leaving his band behind. Warden moved to St. Louis, Missouri, where he attended flight school and played local clubs in his spare time.

=== With Porter Wagoner ===
While visiting his parents in West Plains, Warden met Porter Wagoner at KWTO-AM in Springfield, Missouri. With Speedy Haworth, they formed the Porter Wagoner Trio and were regulars on ABC television's Ozark Jubilee broadcast from Springfield. In 1957, Warden joined the Grand Ole Opry with Wagoner, and in 1960 began a 14-year television run on the syndicated program, The Porter Wagoner Show.

In 1966, singer Dolly Parton joined the show and Wagoner and Parton, backed by the Wagonmasters, became one of country music's most popular duos. Parton left the show in 1974 to pursue a solo career, and Warden joined her as her full-time manager, a job he held until his death.

Warden was inducted into the Steel Guitar Hall of Fame in 2008.

Warden had been in failing health and died on March 11, 2017, sixteen days before his 88th birthday.
