= Uncle Cyp and Aunt Sap Brasfield =

Vaudeville double act

Boob and Neva Brasfield in 1958

Laurence Lemarr Brasfield (March 1, 1898 – September 9, 1966) and Neva Inez Fisher Brasfield (March 14, 1889 – March 19, 1980), better known as Uncle Cyp and Aunt Sap, were an American country comedy duo. Their acting careers, which began in the late 1910s, spanned the vaudeville era and extended to appearances on network television.

Laurence also performed on Broadway. The married couple had leading roles in hundreds of dramatic and comedic performances on Southern and Midwestern tent repertory show circuits before joining ABC-TV's Ozark Jubilee, where they performed from 1955 to 1960.

== Biographies ==
=== Laurence "Boob" Brasfield ===
Boob Brasfield as Uncle Cyp, c.1945

Laurence Brasfield was born in Smithville, Mississippi. He later said that his mother Nonnie's humor was a major influence in his becoming a comedian. In 1912, at age 14, he joined the Mighty Haag Circus as a roustabout. The next year he did blackface comedy with a horse-and-wagon show. Later he joined a New Orleans, Louisiana stock company. Soon he was traveling with the Redpath Chautauqua tent circuit, which often featured attorney William Jennings Bryan as a speaker. Early in his career, Brasfield adopted the nickname Boob.

For the next ten years, Brasfield performed as an actor and worked as a stage manager in both Broadway productions and the road companies of hit shows. In 1920, he had a part in Miss Lulu Bett. He served as stage manager for Enter Madame, which had a two-year Broadway run. In 1922, he became stage manager for the smash hit Abie’s Irish Rose at the Republic Theatre.

=== Neva Brasfield ===
Neva I. F. Greevi was born in Luther, Michigan. After attending local public schools, she attended Ouachita Baptist College in Arkadelphia, Arkansas for three years. She worked as a cashier for a time before marrying Brasfield in 1919. He was nine years her junior. She became a leading lady with the W. I. Swain tent show.

== Career together ==
Beginning in the mid-1920s, the Brasfields were featured players with (Jess) Bisbee's Comedians, a popular touring tent repertory troupe based in Memphis, Tennessee. It was part of Bisbee's Dramatic Shows. Boob played the requisite "Toby" character as a hillbilly. He established a reputation as "King of Tobys" for his quick ad-libbing ability and comic facial contortions. Brasfield was the highest-paid performer of the Bisbee troupe. He also wrote and directed performances, in addition to appearing in most of its plays. His younger brother, comedian Rod Brasfield, joined him. They performed with the troupe with Rod serving as Boob's straight man.

In 1933, during the Great Depression, their tent show folded in Lewisburg, Kentucky. It was a difficult period for many performing troupes.

Brasfield was the headliner; he organized the performers into his own troupe, known as the Century Players. They were based in Centerville, Tennessee, during the winter of 1933–34. They performed in schoolhouses in such surrounding towns as Little Lot, Bon Aqua and Hohenwald. On their nights in Centerville, hometown girl and native Minnie Pearl often performed. Boob also owned a "circle stock company" from 1939 to 1942 that played in the Gadsden Theatre in Gadsden, Alabama.

=== Uncle Cyp and Aunt Sap ===
In the mid-1940s, Brasfield adopted the Uncle Cyprus character, shortened to "Cyp," when he began performing on radio programs with his brother Rod. Neva became his frequent stage partner as "Aunt Sap." Rod developed the characters for his routines about fictional residents in his adopted hometown of Hohenwald, Tennessee.

Cyp and Sap were portrayed as an older married couple who quibbled over everyday matters, with Cyp often coming off as a henpecked husband. They continued touring the country through the 1940s, doing tent shows and sketch comedy. Boob also wrote Grand Ole Opry skits for Rod and Minnie Pearl, among others. By the early 1950s, the Brasfield couple retired to their ranch called Rancho Pocito in the Rio Grande Valley near Edinburg, Texas. Both Brasfields were designated as Kentucky colonels, an honorary title bestowed by the governor of the state.

In 1955, their long-time friend Red Foley convinced them to return to show business on ABC-TV's Ozark Jubilee, produced in Springfield, Missouri. They became mainstays and were among the few performers with the show for its entire run. The couple, often introduced by the opening bars of "Turkey In The Straw", usually performed small-town domestic sketch comedy together. They sometimes involved others on the show. Uncle Cyp also performed solo, or with Foley, Bill Ring, announcer Joe Slattery, or singer Brenda Lee. Their one child was a daughter, Bonnie Inez Brasfield, who sometimes appeared in their routines. Rod Brasfield appeared once with "Cyp" on the show in 1957. Boob appeared on other TV programs as well, including The Ed Sullivan Show in 1956.

In January 1958, The Billboard reported that the Brasfield couple and Rod had begun filming a series of 52 fifteen-minute comedy programs for syndicated distribution on television. During the summer of 1958, the couple toured with Bisbee's Comedians in Kentucky and Tennessee. During this time, they flew to Springfield on alternate Saturdays to appear on the Jubilee. On August 29, 1959, Uncle Cyp was a fill-in host on the show. and In October 1959, Boob sustained minor injuries from a backstage fall during a Cotton Bowl performance with Foley and a Jubilee touring unit at the Texas State Fair.

After the Jubilee was canceled in 1960, the Brasfields appeared on its spin-off, Five Star Jubilee, in 1961. That summer Boob toured with Foley through 22 states. The couple retired from show business for the final time and returned to Texas. Uncle Cyp was recorded in performance on the 1963 Decca LP record, The Red Foley Show (DL-4341).

=== Deaths ===
Laurence Brasfield died in Raymondville, Texas on September 9, 1966, at age 68 from lung cancer. His widow Neva survived him by more than a decade, dying March 19, 1980 in Raymondville at 91. She was buried next to him in Raymondville Cemetery.
