= The Eddy Arnold Show =

American musical variety program

- Genre: Musical variety
- Directed by: Ben Park (1953); Bryan T. Bisney (1956)
- Starring: Eddy Arnold
- Country of origin: United States
- Original language: English
- No. of seasons: 3

Production
- Executive producers: Si Siman (1956); John B. Mahaffey (1956)
- Producers: Charlie Brown, Bryan T. Bisney (1956)
- Camera setup: Multi-camera
- Running time: 15 minutes (CBS, NBC); 30 minutes (ABC)
- Production company: Crossroads TV Productions (1956)

Original release
- Network: CBS
- Release: July 14 – August 22, 1952

Related
- The Eddy Arnold Show (1953, NBC); The Eddy Arnold Show (1956, ABC)

The Eddy Arnold Show is the name of three similar American television summer variety programs during the 1950s hosted by Eddy Arnold and featuring popular music stars of the day. It was also the name of a radio program starring Arnold.

== CBS ==
The Eddy Arnold Show debuted on CBS-TV on July 14, 1952 from New York City, as a live 15-minute summer replacement for The Perry Como Show on Monday, Wednesday, and Friday nights from 7:45–8 pm ET. Arnold's guitarists Hank Garland and Roy Wiggins (steel guitar) appeared. The program's final broadcast was August 22, 1952.

== NBC ==
From July 7 to October 1, 1953, NBC-TV carried The Eddy Arnold Show as a live 15-minute summer replacement for The Dinah Shore Show. The program aired on Tuesday and Thursday nights from 7:30–7:45 pm ET, and featured Russ Case and the NBC Orchestra, as well as Garland and Wiggins. Guests included the Davis Sisters and the Dickens Sisters. Ben Park was the producer, Dave Parker was the director, and Marvin David was the writer.

=== Critical response ===
A review in the trade publication Variety said, "Arnold is an easy-going host besides being one of the top country performers, and his music is simple and pleasant". It also commended the show's "sets, camera work and other production trappings."

== ABC ==
The Eddy Arnold Show had its longest run on ABC-TV from April 26 to September 26, 1956, as a half-hour series. The live program aired from 8–8:30 pm ET on Thursdays as a summer replacement for Life is Worth Living, then on June 20 moved to 9:30–10 pm on Wednesdays.

This show featured a regular cast of Chet Atkins, Garland, Wiggins, and the instrumental Paul Mitchell (piano) Quartet. The Springfield News & Leader observed, "The show is plain and warm, utilizing virtually no sets but building its numbers around lighting effects."

The program originated from the Jewell Theatre (before an audience of about 500) in Springfield, Missouri, which was equipped for live television production as the home of ABC's Ozark Jubilee. Its original producer and writer was Charlie Brown, who left in August 1956 after he had won the Democratic primary election on his way to becoming a US representative. Jubilee producer-director Bryan Bisney took over, with the Jubilee's Don Richardson becoming writer. Guest stars included:

- Eileen Barton (May 3)
- Pat Boone (scheduled June 20; preempted)
- Shirley Caddell (August 29)
- Cathy Carr (June 27)
- Karen Chandler (May 10)
- Beverly Collins (July 4)
- Johnny Desmond (August 1)
- The Diamonds (July 25)
- Peggy Dietrick (September 5)
- Anita Ellis (July 11)
- The Foggy Rover Boys (September 12)
- Sunny Gale (June 14)
- Julie Gilmer (September 26)
- Dolores Hawkins (April 26)
- The Hilltoppers (June 7)
- Betty Johnson (July 18)
- Betty Madigan (June 7)
- Vaughn Monroe (May 17)
- Lou Monte (August 8)
- Helen O'Connell (May 24)
- The Philharmonics (August 29)
- Lu Ann Simms (May 31)
- Trio Los Borincanos (September 19)
- Fran Warren (August 15)
