= Margie Bowes =

American country music singer (1941–2020)

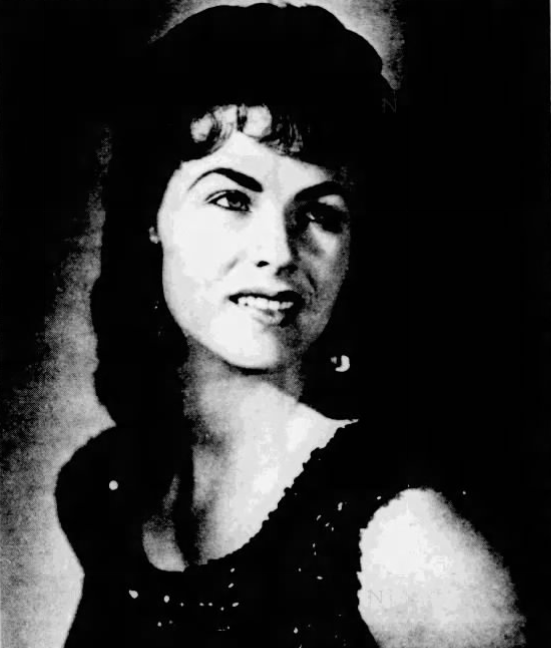
- Bowes in 1967

Background information
- Birth name: Margie Marie Bowes
- Born: March 18, 1941; Roxboro, North Carolina, U.S.
- Died: October 22, 2020 (aged 79); Brentwood, Tennessee, U.S.
- Genres: Country music
- Occupation: Singer
- Instrument: Vocals
- Years active: 1958–2020
- Labels: Hickory, Decca, Stop Records

Margie Marie Bowes (March 18, 1941 – October 22, 2020) was an American country music singer who was popular in the late 1950s. She had a top 10 country hit, "Poor Old Heartsick Me", in 1959. She was briefly married to Doyle Wilburn of the Wilburn Brothers.

== Biography ==
=== Early years ===
Bowes was born on March 18, 1941, in Roxboro, North Carolina. She began singing in elementary school. By the time she was 13 years old, she was appearing on TV programs including WDVA Virginia Barn Dance in Danville, WRXO-AM in Roxboro and other radio programs in North Carolina. In 1958, Bowes participated in the Pet Milk Company's nationwide talent search. She entered the contest in Nashville, Tennessee and won the competition later that year.

=== Recording career ===
Bowes signed with Hickory Records and released her first single in 1958, "Won'tcha Come Back to Me" backed with "One Broken Heart". The singles gained some attention, but failed to chart. Her next two-sided single, "One Time Too Many"/"Violets and Cheap Perfume" also failed to chart, but she made her debut on the Grand Ole Opry later that year. In 1959, she released her third single, "Poor Old Heartsick Me". The song proved very successful for Bowes, and it just made the country top 10 that year. "Poor Old Heartsick Me" remained her signature tune.

In 1959, she released her follow-up, "My Love and Little Me". The song made the country top 20 and demonstrated she was more than a one-hit wonder. Bowes appeared on ABC-TV's Jubilee USA, and between 1959 and 1960 she released three more singles, though none of them gained any further success.

In 1961, Bowes moved to Mercury Records and released a single that year called "Little Miss Belong to No One". The song just missed the top 20. No other singles with Mercury were successful for Bowes. By 1963, she moved to Decca Records and again started releasing singles that year. She had two singles that made the Top 40 with Decca. By 1969, Bowes left the label and recorded one more time for Stop Records in the early 1970s. Margie married Doyle Wilburn, half of the popular Country duo, the Wilburn Brothers on November 11, 1961. They had one daughter born in 1962. She died January 29, 2020. Neither Bowes nor Wilburn ever remarried.

=== Later life ===
In the late 1960s she appeared in a movie called Golden Guitar. In 1995, Bowes was in a car accident, suffering a serious foot injury resulting in numerous operations. Prior to her car accident, she worked for many years in the medical field. Bowes died on October 22, 2020, in Brentwood, Tennessee after an extended illness.

== Discography ==
=== Albums ===
Year	Album details
1966	Margie Bowes Sings: Released: June 1966; Label: Decca
1967	Today's Country Sound: Released: 1968; Label: Decca

=== Singles ===
Year	Single	US Country
1958	"One Broken Heart"	—
1958	"One Time Too Many"	—
1959	"Poor Old Heartsick Me"	10
1959	"My Love and Little Me"	15
1959	"Make a Wish"	—
1960	"Day After Day"	—
1960	"Are You Teasing Me"	—
1961	"Little Miss Belong to No One"	21
1961	"Lonely Pillow"	—
1962	"You're Still a Part of Me"	—
1963	"Think It Over"	—
1963	"Our Things"	33
1964	"Understand Your Gal"	26
1964	"Overnight"	—
1964	"Big City"	—
1965	"I Can't Love That Way"	—
1966	"That Completely Destroys My Plans"	—
1966	"It's Enough to Make a Woman Lose Her Mind"	—
1967	"A Man Around the House"	—
1968	"Broken Hearted, Too"	—
1968	"Gatherin' Dust"	—
1969	"I Have What It Takes"	—
1970	"The Note"	—
