= Lester E. Cox =

Lester Edmund Cox (1895–1968)

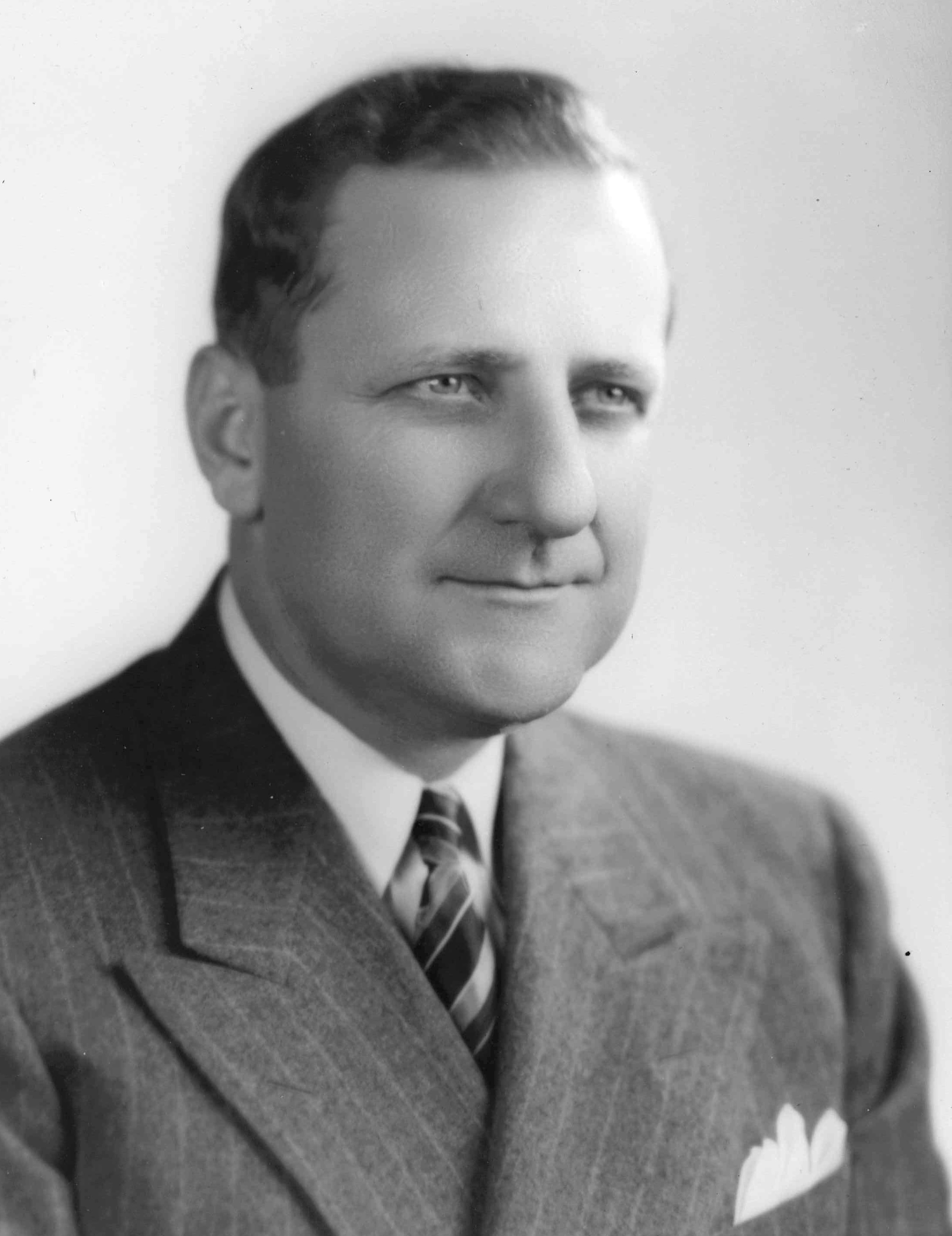
- Born: Lester Edmund Cox; August 22, 1895; Republic, Missouri, U.S.
- Died: August 14, 1968 (aged 72); Springfield, Missouri, U.S.
- Resting place: Hazelwood Cemetery
- Education: Drury College
- Occupation: Business magnate
- Spouse: Mildred Belle Lee Cox (m. 1918)
- Children: Virginia; Lester L; Cathryn
- Military career
- Allegiance: United States
- Branch: United States Army
- Service years: 1917–1932
- Rank: Major
- Unit: US Air Corps
- Conflicts: World War I

Lester Edmund Cox (August 22, 1895 – August 14, 1968) was an American business executive with interests in mass media, distribution, transportation, and banking in southwest Missouri. He is best known for his service to Burge Hospital (CoxHealth), which adopted his namesake upon his death.

== Early life ==
Lester Edmund Cox was born to James Mitchell Cox and Amanda Belle Britain Cox, in Republic, Missouri. He was raised on a farm as a child, finding additional work in the community. In 1915, Cox attended Drury College, becoming close friends with roommate Ernest R. Breech. While attending Drury, Cox bought the advertising rights to the school's newspaper, the Drury Mirror, to then resell to Springfield businesses for a profit. He would also sell shoes on campus that he had purchased in bulk. Cox later joined the US Air Corps in 1917 during WWI, narrowly escaping death in a plane crash which proved fatal for his co-pilot. After the war, he returned home to marry Mildred Belle Lee, daughter of Springfield, MO mayor Robert E. Lee.

== Early career ==
Cox began his professional career at Martin Brothers Piano Company holding the roles of vice-president and general manager, expanding into Fort Scott, Kansas, Rogers, Arkansas, Miami, Oklahoma, and Poplar Bluff, Missouri. In 1921, Cox established the first Boy Scout Band in the country with R. Ritchie Robertson as director, growing the band to 440 members in 1928 and holding the title of the largest Boy Scout Band. He would serve as the band's business manager for 19 years, stepping down in 1939. Cox and Robertson formed the Kiltie Drum Corp at Springfield Senior High School in 1926, it was the first all-female drum corps group in the country.

Lester E. Cox worked with Ralph D. Foster, owner of KGBX of St. Joseph, Missouri, as well as the FRC, bringing the first local radio station to Springfield, MO in 1932. Cox followed up by founding KWTO ("Keep Watching the Ozarks") and later WTMV, co-founding KCMO in Kansas City, and partnering with Victor Baxter in the Pittsburg Broadcasting Company operating KOAM.

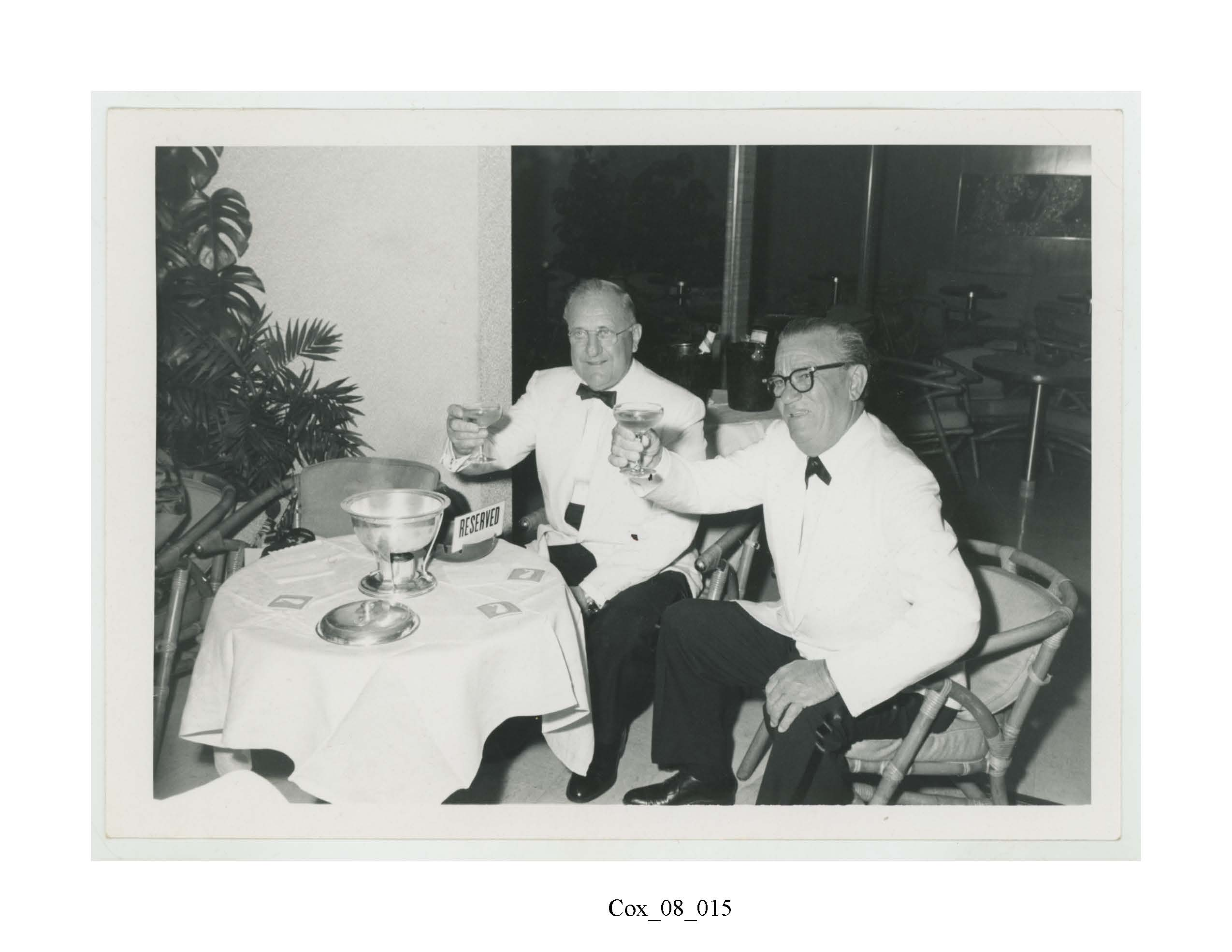
Lester E. Cox and Ralph D. Foster, 1965

== Later career ==
Impressed with the operations of the new Ford 9N tractor at the 1939 World's Fair in New York, Cox would start Ozark Tractor & Implement Company, K.C. Tractor & Implement Company in Kansas City, and Modern Tractor & Supply Company in Oklahoma City, becoming the largest Ford tractor dealer in the country and distributing 15% of the total output of Ford tractors and farm implements during those years. He pioneered a tractor training school southwest of Springfield called Kickapoo Prairie Farm. Ford Tractor would later adopt the model of Kickapoo Prairie nationwide. Kickapoo Prairie, and the original farmhouse, can be found today at Chesterfield Village in Springfield, MO.

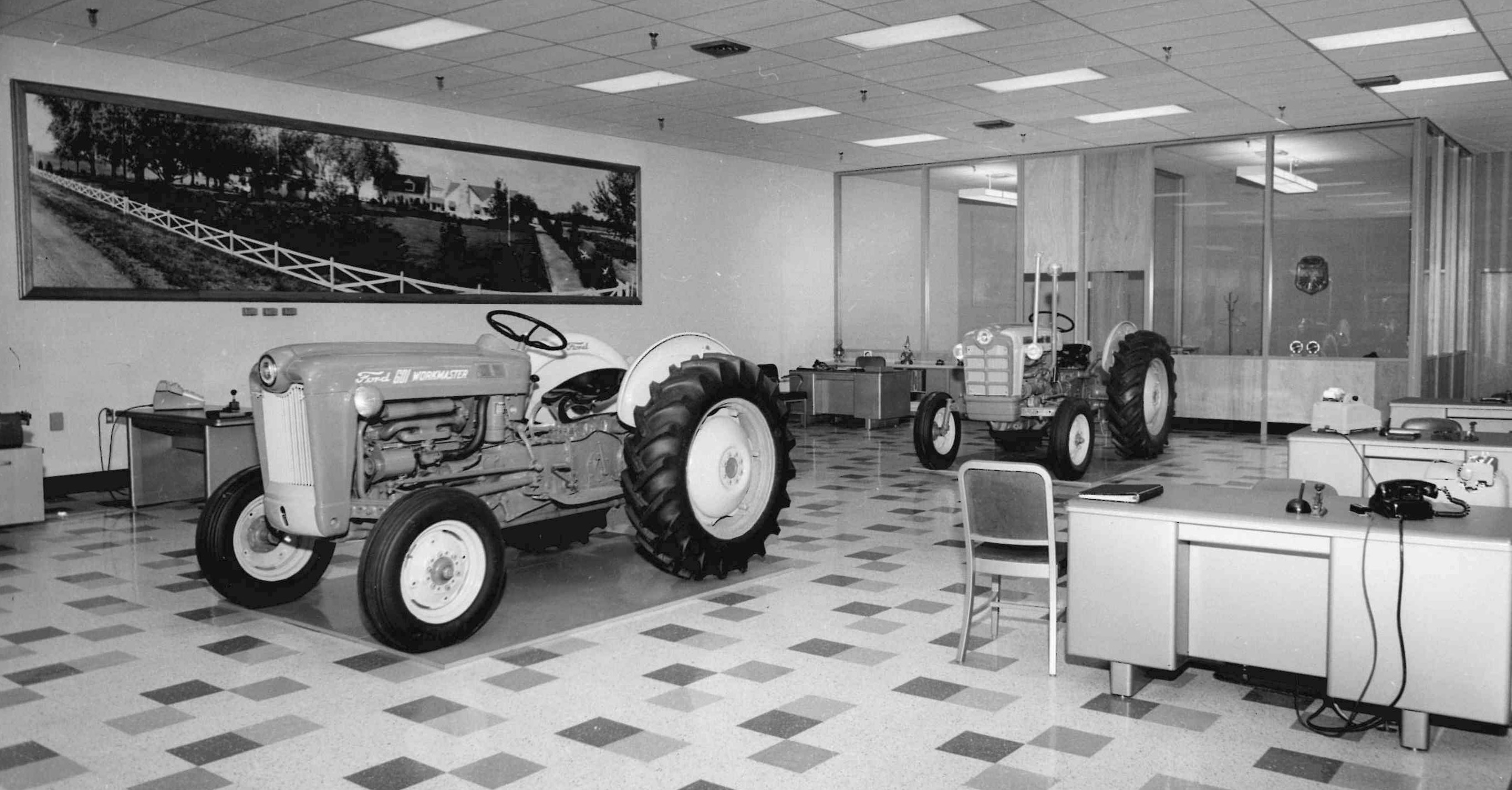
Ozark Tractor and Implement Company showroom in Springfield, MO

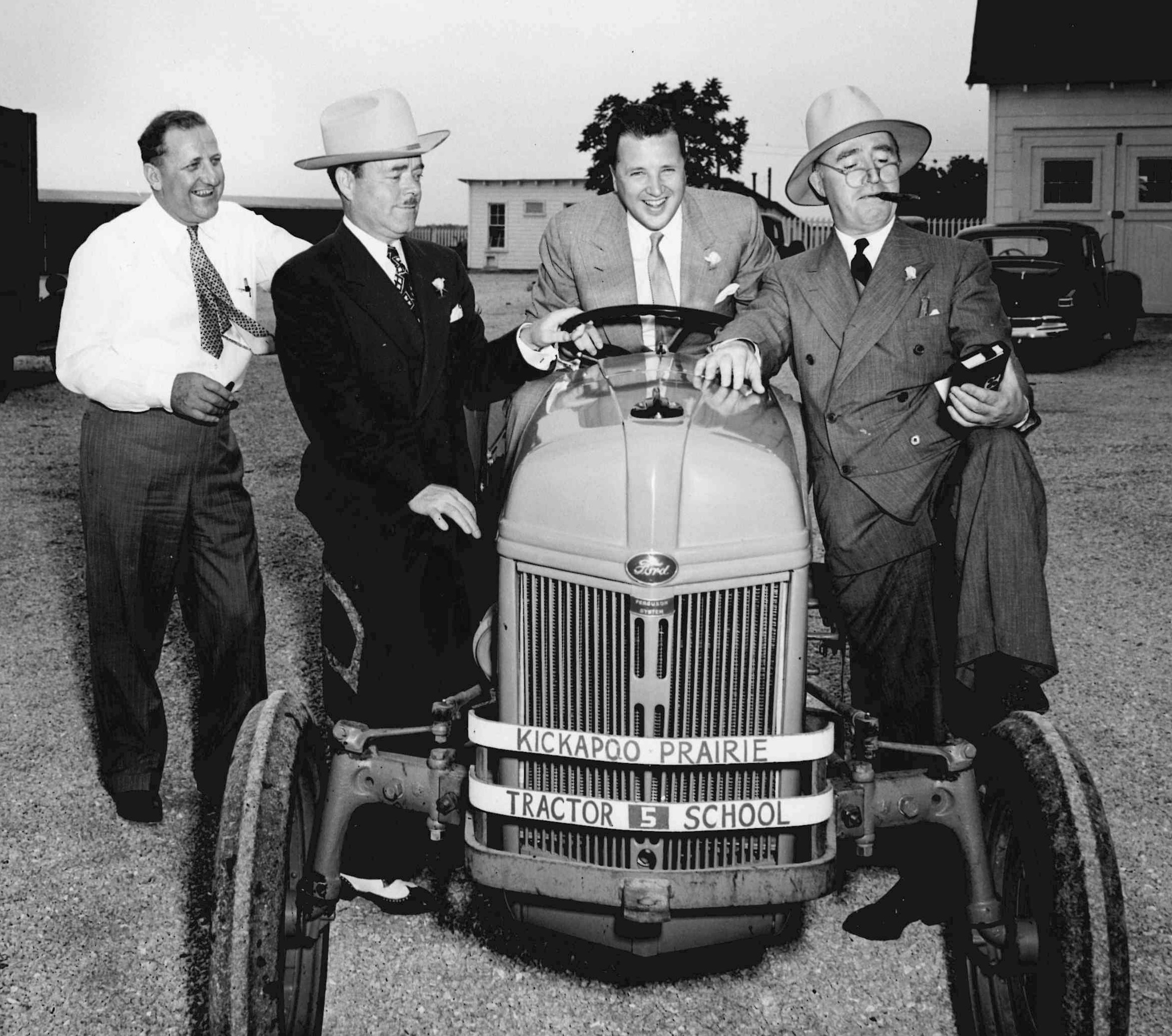
Lester E. Cox, Ernest Breech, Henry Ford II, and J. R. Davis at Kickapoo Prairie Farms.

Other business interests would include: Cox-Davis Dairy Farm, Big Boy Fertilizer, the Springfield Credit Bureau, the Oklahoma Fertilizer and Chemical Company, The Pioneer Advertising Company (eventually becoming the largest OOH conglomerate in Missouri), Superior Outdoor Advertising Company, Overland Outdoor Advertising Company, Gold Label Furniture Company, appliance distribution, warehousing companies in both Oklahoma City and Kansas City, post-war manufactured housing, and a half-dozen radio stations. He would also help start and hold half ownership of KYTV.

During his tenure as president of the Springfield, Missouri Chamber of Commerce, Cox secured the city's first $1,000,000 roadway project, as well as the federal and state funding for the Springfield–Branson National Airport. Lester served on the board of trustees at Drury College, the Board of Curators of the University of Missouri, the Governing Board of SMU, the Missouri Commission on Higher Education, and the Missouri State Board of Health. While serving the University of Missouri, he secured KOMU-TV for the university, established a university power plant, and initiated the establishment of the four-year program at the University of Missouri School of Medicine. Additional, he served on the Frisco Railroad Board of Directors and as Chairman of the Board of Ozark Air Lines.

== Burge Hospital and CoxHealth ==
In 1949, Springfield's Burge Hospital, was on the brink of closure due to financial strain. Joining the board of directors, Cox challenged the Burge doctors to raise funds within the community, which he would personally match. As the President of the Board of Directors, the funds were raised and a $1,000,000 expansion was completed on September 7, 1952.

Under his leadership, the hospital system grew and saw numerous major expansions, growing from an initial 40 bed hospital into a 534-bed hospital in 1968, the year of Cox's death.

He would serve on the hospital board until his death in August 1968. Immediately following his death, Cox's longtime friend, father-in-law of his daughter, and fellow board member, Forest W. Lipscomb proposed renaming the hospital in Cox's honor. Nine months later, Burge Hospital changed its name to Lester E. Cox Medical Center. Today, CoxHealth has over 14,000 employees and remains a leader in healthcare in the region.

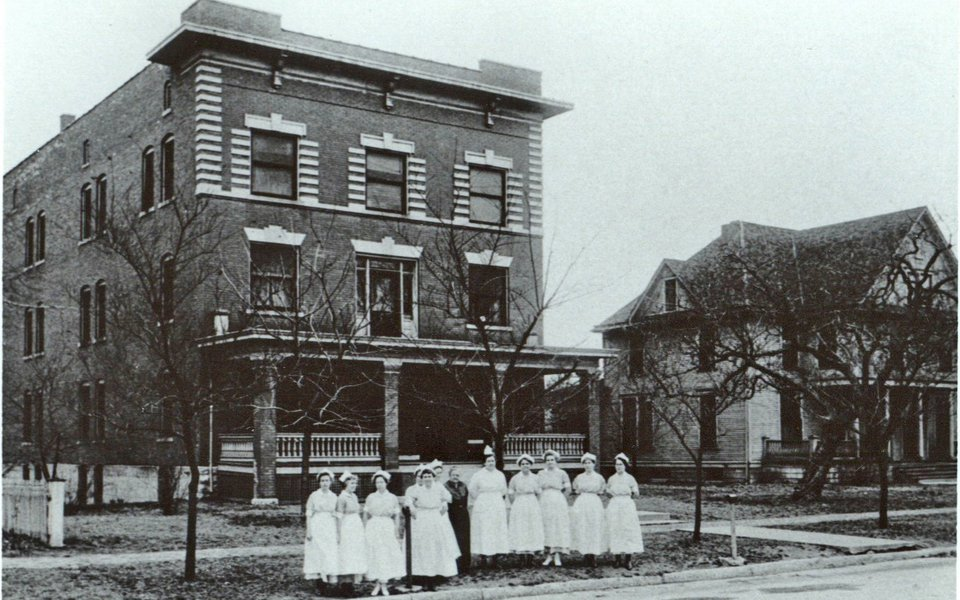
Nurses standing in front of Burge Hospital, Springfield, MO.

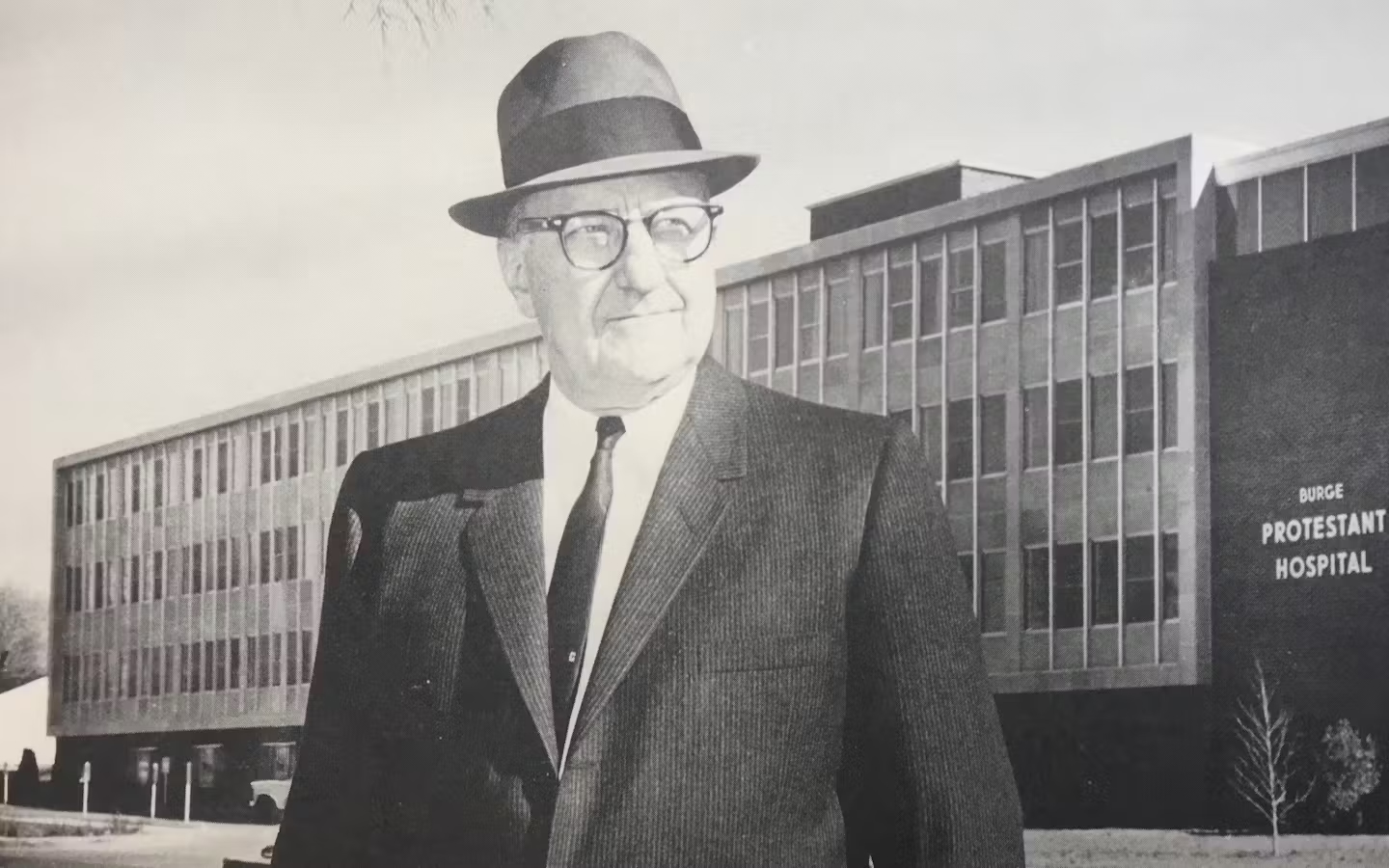
Lester E. Cox standing in front of Burge Hospital in 1966

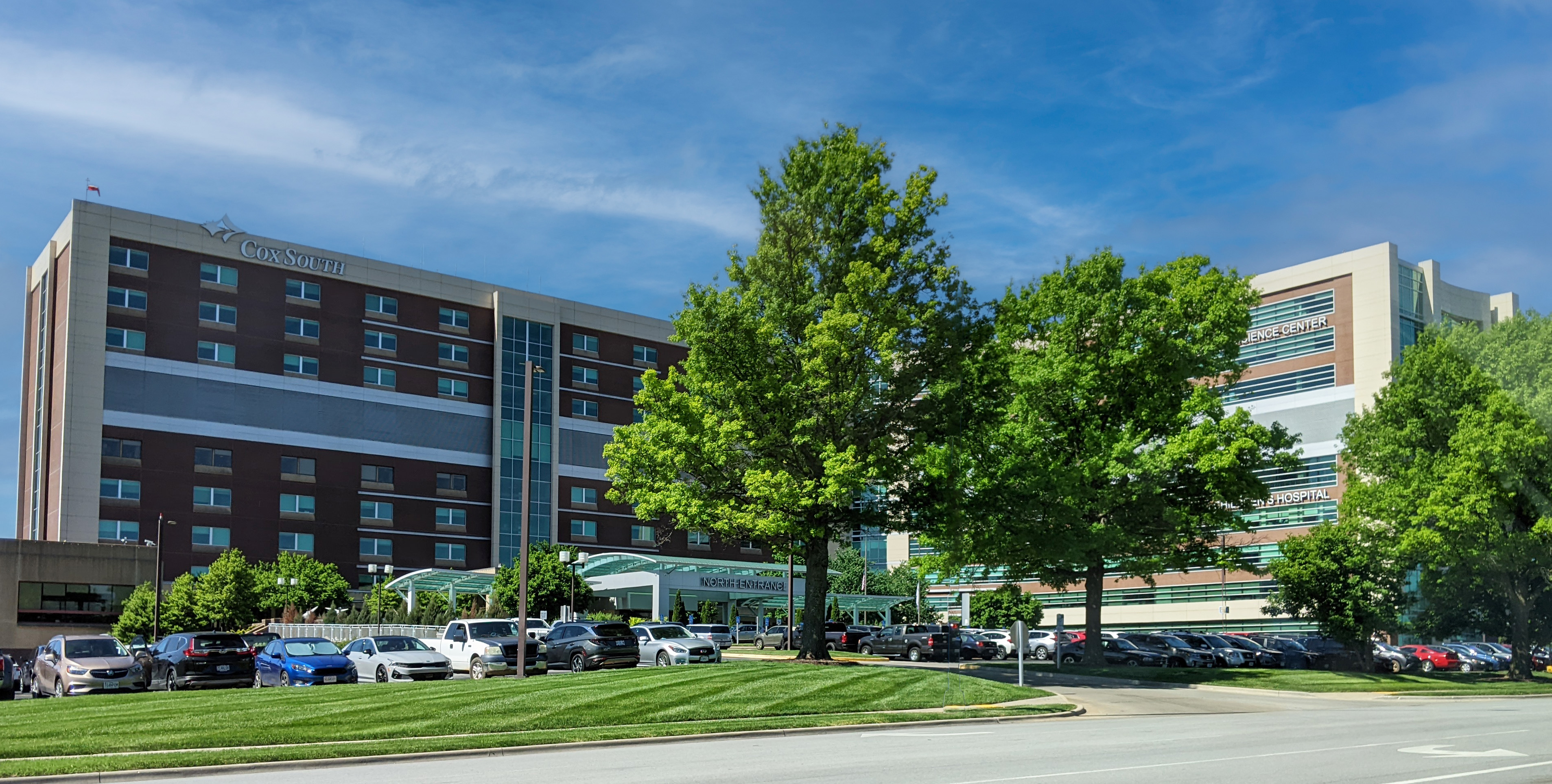
CoxHealth South
