= Porter Wagoner =

American country singer (1927–2007)

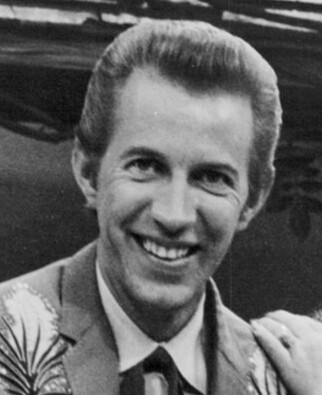
- Wagoner in 1969

Background information
- Also known as: Mr. Grand Ole Opry
- Born: Porter Wayne Wagoner; August 12, 1927; West Plains, Missouri, U.S.
- Died: October 28, 2007 (aged 80) Nashville, Tennessee, U.S.
- Genres: Country music, gospel
- Occupations: Singer, songwriter, musician
- Years active: 1951–2007
- Labels: RCA Victor (1951–1980); Shell Point (2000–2002); TeeVee (2003–2006); Anti (2007)

Porter Wayne Wagoner (August 12, 1927 – October 28, 2007) was an American country music singer known for his flashy Nudie and Manuel suits and blond pompadour.

In 1967 he introduced singer Dolly Parton on his television show, The Porter Wagoner Show. She became part of a well-known vocal duo with him from the late 1960s to the early 1970s.

Known as Mr. Grand Ole Opry, Wagoner charted 81 singles from 1954 to 1983. He was elected to the Country Music Hall of Fame in 2002.

== Biography ==
=== Early life and career ===
Wagoner was born in West Plains, Missouri, United States, the fifth and last child, and second son, of Bertha May (née Bridges) and Charles E. Wagoner, a farmer. His first band, the Blue Ridge Boys, performed on radio station KWPM-AM from a butcher shop in his native West Plains, where Wagoner cut meat. In 1951, he was hired by Si Siman as a performer on KWTO in Springfield, Missouri. This led to a contract with RCA Victor.

With lagging sales, Wagoner and his trio played schoolhouses for the gate proceeds; but in 1953, his song "Trademark" became a hit for Carl Smith, followed by a few hits of his own for RCA Victor. Starting in 1955, he was a featured performer on ABC-TV's Ozark Jubilee in Springfield. He often appeared on the show as part of the Porter Wagoner Trio with Don Warden and Speedy Haworth. Warden, on steel guitar, became Wagoner's long-time business manager. In 1957, Wagoner and Warden moved to Nashville, Tennessee, joining the Grand Ole Opry.

=== Chart success ===
Wagoner's 81 charted records include "A Satisfied Mind" (number one, 1955), "Misery Loves Company" (number one, 1962), "I've Enjoyed as Much of This as I Can Stand" (number seven, 1962–1963), "Sorrow on the Rocks" (number five, 1964), "Green, Green Grass of Home" (number four, 1965), "Skid Row Joe" (number three, 1965–1966), "The Cold Hard Facts of Life" (number two, 1967), and "The Carroll County Accident" (number two, 1968–1969).

Among his hit duets with Dolly Parton were a remake of Tom Paxton's "The Last Thing on My Mind" (1967), "We'll Get Ahead Someday" (1968), "Just Someone I Used to Know" (1969), "Daddy Was An Old Time Preacher Man" (1970), "Better Move It on Home" (1971), "The Right Combination" (1972), "Please Don't Stop Loving Me" (number one, 1974), and "Making Plans" (number two, 1980). He also won three Grammy Awards for gospel recordings.

=== Television series ===
His syndicated television program, The Porter Wagoner Show, aired from 1960 to 1981, with 686 30-minute episodes taped, the first 104 (1960–66) in black-and-white and the remainder (1966–81) in color. At its peak, his show was featured in over 100 markets, with an average viewership over three million. Reruns of the program air on the rural cable network RFD-TV and its sister channel in the UK Rural TV.

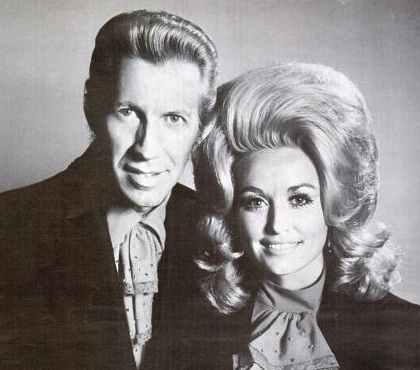
Wagoner and Dolly Parton in 1971

The shows usually featured opening performances by Wagoner with performances by Norma Jean, or later Dolly Parton, and comedic interludes by Speck Rhodes. During Parton's tenure, she and Wagoner usually sang a duet. Each episode also featured a guest who would usually perform one or two songs. A spiritual or gospel performance was almost always featured toward the end of the show, generally performed by either Wagoner, Parton, or the show's guest star, or occasionally the entire cast. After Parton left the show, Porter began taping the show at Opryland USA in various locations around the park.

The shows had a friendly, informal feel, with Wagoner trading jokes with band members (frequently during songs) and exchanging banter with Dolly Parton and Don Howser. In 1974 Parton's song "I Will Always Love You", written about her professional break from Wagoner, went to number one on the country music chart.

Wagoner's stage alter ego was Skid Row Joe. The cast included:

- Singer Norma Jean (1960–1967)
- Singer Jeannie Seely (1965–1966)
- Singer Dolly Parton (1967–1974)
- Singer Barbara Lea (1974–1976)
- Singer Linda Carol Moore (1976–1978)
- Singer Mel Tillis (1968 regular)
- Comedian/stand-up bass Curly Harris (1960–mid 1960s)
- Announcer Don Howser

=== The Wagonmasters ===
==== 1961 ====
Don Warden on steel guitar
"Little" Jack Little on fiddle
Benny Williams on banjo and guitar (1961)
Speck Rhodes Comedian/stand-up bass

==== Mid-1960s ====
Buck Trent on banjo and guitar
George McCormick on rhythm guitar
Mack Magaha on fiddle
Ray Downs on rhythm guitar and vocal
Michael Treadwell on bass guitar
Shannon Randolph Porter on lead guitar

==== After 1974 ====
Bruce Osborn on lead guitar
Fred Newell on banjo/guitar/mandolin
Dave Kirby on guitar
Stu Basore on steel guitar/dobro
Bobby Dyson on bass
Jerry Carrigan on drums
Mack Magaha on fiddle
Colene Walters on vocals/harmonica
Mike Pearson on lead guitar

=== Later work ===
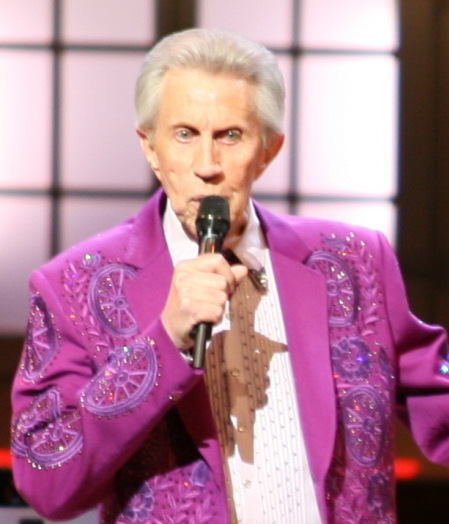
Wagoner in May 2007

Wagoner brought James Brown to the Grand Ole Opry, produced a rhythm and blues album for Joe Simon, and appeared in the Clint Eastwood film Honkytonk Man. During the mid 1980s, Wagoner formed an all-girl group, the Right Combination, named after one of his hit records with Parton, and toured with them for several years. He also hosted Opry Backstage during the 1990s on The Nashville Network. Though Parton's departure was difficult for both, the two reconciled in the late 1980s and appeared together a number of times in the following years. Parton inducted Wagoner into the Country Music Hall of Fame in 2002.

Wagoner made a guest appearance on the HBO comedy series Da Ali G Show in 2004, its second season, interviewed by Borat Sagdiyev.

Wagoner was honored on August 12, 2007, his 80th birthday, at the Grand Ole Opry for his 50 years of membership. It was telecast on GAC's Grand Ole Opry Live that day, with artists including Parton, Marty Stuart, and Patty Loveless. Grand Ole Opry Live host Nan Kelley was part of the birthday celebration.

On June 5, 2007, Wagoner released his final album, called Wagonmaster. Produced by Stuart for the Anti- label, the album received the best reviews of Wagoner's career and briefly appeared on the country chart. A music video was also produced of one of the tracks, a cover of Johnny Cash's "Committed to Parkview". He toured during the summer of 2007 to promote the album, including a late-July appearance on Late Show with David Letterman. One of these performances was to open for the rock group the White Stripes at a sold-out concert at Madison Square Garden in New York City.

== Personal life and death ==
Wagoner was married twice, to Velma Johnson for less than a year in 1943 and to Ruth Olive Williams from 1946 to 1986, though they separated 20 years before the divorce. He fathered three children, Richard, Denise, and Debra.

Wagoner, a heavy smoker, died from lung cancer in Nashville on October 28, 2007, with his family and Dolly Parton at his side. His funeral was held November 1, 2007, at the Grand Ole Opry House. He is buried at Woodlawn Memorial Park in Nashville.

== Legacy ==
Dolly Parton performed a concert at her theme park Dollywood in Wagoner's memory after his death.

Porter Wagoner Boulevard, a road in his native West Plains, Missouri, is named in his honor.

In 2013 the television show Drunk History presented a brief summary of Wagoner's relationship with Parton.

Dan Cooper at AllMusic noted, "As for his music, after signing with RCA in 1952 he produced a wealth of superb hard country, and just as much of the most wretchedly oversentimentalized tripe you'll ever want to hear. The latter, of course, is half the reason he's loved".

== Discography ==
=== Studio albums ===
- Satisfied Mind (1957)
- A Slice of Life: Songs Happy 'n' Sad (1962)
- Porter Wagoner and Skeeter Davis Sing Duets (with Skeeter Davis) (1962)
- Y'all Come (1963)
- The Bluegrass Story (1964)
- The Thin Man from West Plains (1965)
- The Grand Ole Gospel (with the Blackwood Brothers Quartet) (1966)
- Confessions of a Broken Man (1966)
- Soul of a Convict and More Great Prison Songs (1967)
- The Cold Hard Facts of Life (1967)
- More Grand Ole Gospel (with the Blackwood Brothers Quartet) (1967)
- Just Between You and Me (with Dolly Parton) (1968)
- The Bottom of the Bottle (1968)
- Just the Two of Us (with Dolly Parton) (1968)
- In Gospel Country (with the Blackwood Brothers Quartet) (1968)
- The Carroll County Accident (1969)
- Always, Always (with Dolly Parton) (1969)
- Me and My Boys (1969)
- You Got-ta Have a License (1970)
- Porter Wayne and Dolly Rebecca (with Dolly Parton) (1970)
- Once More (with Dolly Parton) (1970)
- Skid Row Joe Down in the Alley (1970)
- Two of a Kind (with Dolly Parton) (1971)
- Simple as I Am (1971)
- Porter Wagoner Sings His Own (1971)
- The Right Combination • Burning the Midnight Oil (with Dolly Parton) (1972)
- What Ain't to Be, Just Might Happen (1972)
- Ballads of Love (1972)
- Together Always (with Dolly Parton) (1972)
- Experience (1972)
- We Found It (with Dolly Parton) (1973)
- Love and Music (with Dolly Parton) (1973)
- I'll Keep on Lovin' You (1973)
- The Farmer (1973)
- Tore Down (1974)
- Porter 'n' Dolly (with Dolly Parton) (1974)
- Highway Headin' South (1974)
- Sing Some Love Songs, Porter Wagoner (1975)
- Say Forever You'll Be Mine (with Dolly Parton) (1975)
- Porter (1977)
- Today (1979)
- When I Sing for Him (1979)
- Porter & Dolly (with Dolly Parton) (1980)
- Porter Wagoner's Greatest (1981)
- Natural Wonder (1982)
- Viva (1983)
- Porter Wagoner (1986)
- The Best I've Ever Been (2000)
- Unplugged (2002)
- 22 Grand Ole Gospel 2004 (2003)
- Something to Brag About (with Pam Gadd) (2004)
- 18 Grand Ole Gospel 2005 (2005)
- Gospel 2006 (2006)
- The Versatile Porter Wagoner (2006)
- Wagonmaster (2007)
- Best of Grand Ole Gospel 2008 (2007)

== Awards ==
Year	Award	Awards	Notes
1966	Best Sacred Recording (Musical)	Grammy Awards	with The Blackwood Brothers
1967	Best Gospel Performance	Grammy Awards	with The Blackwood Brothers
1968	Vocal Duet of the Year	Music City News Awards	with Dolly Parton
1968	Vocal Group of the Year	CMA Awards	with Dolly Parton
1969	Best Gospel Performance	Grammy Awards	with The Blackwood Brothers
1969	Vocal Duet of the Year	Music City News Awards	with Dolly Parton
1970	Vocal Duo of the Year	CMA Awards	with Dolly Parton
1970	Vocal Duet of the Year	Music City News Awards	with Dolly Parton
1971	Vocal Duo of the Year	CMA Awards	with Dolly Parton
1998	Living Legend	TNN/Music City News Country Awards	
2002	Inductee	Country Music Hall of Fame	
2007	WagonMaster Award	Americana Music Association	
