= Speedy Haworth =

American guitarist and singer

- Haworth c. 1960

Background information
- Birth name: Herschel Haworth Jr.
- Also known as: Speedy Haworth, Junior Haworth
- Born: May 16, 1922
- Origin: Springfield, Missouri, USA
- Died: February 26, 2008 (aged 85); Springfield, Missouri
- Genres: country, gospel
- Occupation(s): guitarist, singer, songwriter, radio and TV performer, recording artist
- Instrument(s): Fender Stratocaster acoustic guitar double neck guitar
- Years active: 1932–2008
- Labels: RCA; Universal
- Formerly of: Slim Wilson; Porter Wagoner; Patsy Cline; Don Warden; Shirley Haworth; Stormie Haworth; The Tall Timber Trio; The Goodwill Trio

Herschel Haworth Jr. (May 16, 1922 – February 26, 2008), better known as Speedy Haworth, was an American guitarist and singer who was involved with the golden age of country music broadcasting in the Ozarks. He was a featured cast member of ABC-TV's Ozark Jubilee from 1955–1960 and is a member of the Missouri Country Music Hall of Fame.

== Biography ==
=== Early years ===
Haworth was born on May 15, 1922, in Springfield, Missouri, at home. His father, Herschel Haworth, was a carpenter of English ancestry. His mother was Vancie Martha Haworth (née Wilson), whose family came to Missouri in a covered wagon from the hills of Tennessee and settled in Nixa, Missouri. She had five sisters: Cassie, Carrie, Edna, Bertha and Myrtle; and one brother, Clyde "Slim" Wilson. The family was musical on his mother's side, therefore Haworth learned to play guitar. His mother and her sisters and brothers often sang together at church functions, and there are some folk music recordings of them in the Library of Congress. Haworth won a yodeling contest when he was 10, and was notable by the age of 21.

=== Radio career ===
Haworth started appearing on the radio with George Earle (dropped Wilson for professional name)--no relation to Slim and Aunt Martha. Earle read the Sunday newspaper comics on the air and Haworth sang and played guitar. He was later succeeded on the "funny paper" program by Howard Lee Arthur and "Little Eddie" Smith. His mother, known on-air as "Aunt Martha", Junior (later called "Speedy) and her brother, Slim Wilson, formed The Goodwill Trio with Haworth as "Junior." They first appeared on KGBX-AM in Springfield in 1932, but moved to co-owned KWTO, the more powerful station, soon after it signed on in 1933. The group made its first public appearance in 1936 at the county courthouse in Galena at a fundraiser.

The trio later became The Goodwill Family when Guy Smith joined them as "Uncle George" and in 1935 "Little Eddie" (Smith)--no relation to "Uncle George". The station, heard across the Ozarks, was a stepping-stone during Haworth's years for such musicians as Porter Wagoner, Les Paul, Chet Atkins and The Browns. The Goodwill Family recorded 250 transcriptions for airing on KWTO when they toured.

=== Television career ===
Haworth was one of several KWTO performers who made the transition to television when Springfield's KYTV produced Ozark Jubilee beginning in December 1953. The program moved to ABC-TV in 1955 and introduced Haworth to a national television audience, where he played lead guitar and remained for the program's nearly six-year run. He also appeared on NBC-TV's Five Star Jubilee in 1961.

Beginning in 1964, he appeared on The Slim Wilson Show on KYTV as a member of the Tall Timber Trio with Wilson and Bob White.

=== Chart successes ===
Haworth, on electric guitar, was part of the original Porter Wagoner Trio with Don Warden (steel guitar). The group began touring, and 1954 brought Wagoner his first top 10 hit with "Company's Comin'". "A Satisfied Mind" came next, went to No. 1 for four weeks and stayed on the charts for more than eight months. In 1955, Wagoner also became a part of Ozark Jubilee, but on February 23, 1957, he moved to Nashville, Tennessee, and joined the Grand Ole Opry. Haworth performed in Nashville with Wagoner, Rex Allen, and Leroy Van Dyke, but preferred living in Springfield. Haworth was later inducted into the Missouri Country Music Hall of Fame with Wagoner.

=== Later years and death ===
Later in his career, Haworth sang more gospel music and performed in smaller venues around the Ozarks and Nashville. He fell in Bolivar while going to play his guitar at a dance. He broke his hip and required several weeks of rehabilitation after surgery. He suffered from Parkinson's disease and was in hospice care for several weeks before his death on February 26, 2008. Haworth was buried in Springfield's Eastlawn Cemetery.

== Legacy ==
Haworth Court is among several streets in a residential neighborhood northeast of downtown Nixa, Missouri named for performers on Ozark Jubilee, including Red Foley Court, Zed Tennis Street, Slim Wilson Boulevard and Ozark Jubilee Drive.
