= Betty Ann Grove =

American actress (1929–2015)

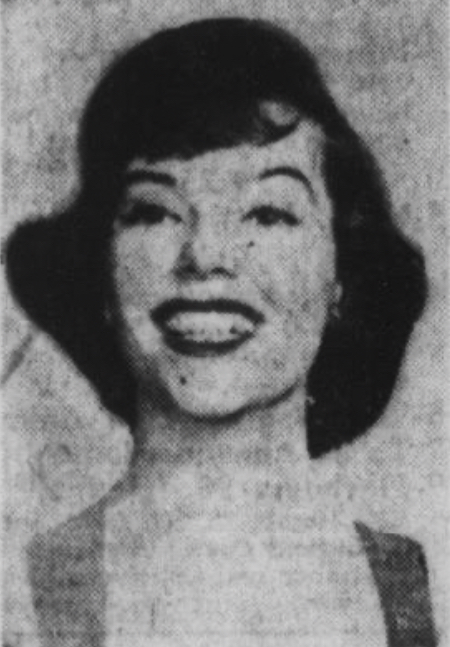
- Grove in a 1957 publication of The Washington Star
- Born: September 9, 1929; Cambridge, Massachusetts, US
- Died: November 13, 2015 (aged 86); Richmond, Virginia, US
- Occupations: Film, television, stage actress
- Spouse: Ed Brown (m. 1955)

Betty Ann Grove (September 9, 1929 – November 13, 2015) was an American actress and singer.

== Early years ==
Grove was born on September 9, 1929, in Cambridge, Massachusetts. Her mother was "an exhibition ballroom dancer" who performed with Ray Bolger and Jack Haley, among others. Grove took her first dancing lessons at age 4 and at 11 was performing professionally by singing and dancing for service clubs in Cambridge.

She attended Longfellow Grammar School and Cambridge High and Latin School. As a high school student, she performed for department stores' fashion shows in Boston.

== Stage ==
In 1950, Grove debuted on Broadway in the 1948 original production of Kiss Me, Kate, playing Lois Lane/Bianca, a lead role that was originated by Lisa Kirk (whom she replaced). She appeared on Broadway in three other shows as well: The 1968 original production of George M!; the 1979 original production of I Remember Mama; and the 1983 revival of On Your Toes.

== Television ==
Grove's network television debut came on The Ed Sullivan Show in 1949. That same year, after three auditions, she became the featured singer on ABC-TV's Stop the Music. A 1951 review of Stop the Music emphasized the "showmanly flair of Miss Grove and [Bert] Parks." In a 1952 magazine article, Parks described Grove's activities during five months in 1950 when she was in both Stop the Music on TV and Kiss Me Kate on Broadway:

At 7:30 every Thursday night she would rush into a dressing room at ABC's Ritz Theatre on West 48th Street, change into her TV costume, tear on stage for her numbers, change again into her first act Kiss Me Kate togs, make a beeline for the Shubert Theatre on West 44th Street, arriving just in time for her on-stage cue. All this following a full day of rehearsing. But audiences never had a hint of her exhausting routine, and night after night her "True To You In My Fashion" and "Why Can't You Behave" were show stoppers.

In 1952, Grove had her own summer replacement program (filling in for Kate Smith's program). She teamed with Merv Griffin in 1954 to co-star in Song Snapshots on a Summer Holiday, the twice-weekly summer replacement for Jo Stafford's program on Tuesdays and Jane Froman's program on Thursdays.

Grove was on The Big Payoff for four years. She said that she resigned from Payoff because "I was getting so lazy, that I knew if I didn't make the break now, I'd be too weak to do it later." She also appeared on such television programs as The Bert Parks Show, The Red Buttons Show and Ozark Jubilee.

== Personal life ==
On September 17, 1955, Grove married Ed Brown, an advertising executive.

She died on November 13, 2015, aged 86, in Richmond, Virginia.

== Partial discography ==
- Waltzing Down the Aisle/I Had a Heart When I Came In (1955 Major 141)
- Stolen Love/You I'm Gonna Marry (1956 Jubilee 5260)
- Your High School Key/The Closer You Are (1956 Jubilee 5254)
