= Bobby Lord =

American country musician (1934–2008)

- Lord c. 1955

Background information
- Birth name: Robert Lester Lord
- Born: January 6, 1934
- Origin: Sanford, Florida, U.S.
- Died: February 16, 2008 (aged 74); Stuart, Florida, U.S.
- Genres: Country; rockabilly
- Occupations: Singer; songwriter; TV host
- Instruments: Vocals; guitar
- Years active: 1952–1989
- Labels: Columbia; Hickory; Decca; Rice

Robert Lester Lord (January 6, 1934 – February 16, 2008) was an American country music singer-songwriter popular in the 1950s and 1960s.

== Biography ==
Lord was born January 6, 1934 in Sanford, Florida, and grew up in Tampa. As a teenager, he entered talent contests, wowing crowds with his edgy rockabilly style. He was popular with Tampa's young crowd, playing concerts at dance halls. At Plant High School, he met his wife, Mozelle, whom he married when he was 20.

After graduating from Plant, he was offered the chance to host his own television show while a freshman at the University of Tampa. The Bobby Lord Homefolks Show was an hour-long program on Saturday nights on WSUN-TV in St. Petersburg and featured Lord singing with a backing band. In 1952, he won a nationwide talent competition sponsored by TV Guide, which led to an appearance on Paul Whiteman's TV Teen Club on ABC-TV from Philadelphia.

Soon after, songwriter Boudleaux Bryant heard one of Lord's demonstration tapes and passed it on to Columbia Records, which signed him in 1953. At age 19, he was the label's youngest recording star. He began releasing country and rockabilly hits for Columbia, and in 1955 joined Ozark Jubilee, an ABC-TV program based in Springfield, Missouri.

In 1960, the Jubilee was canceled and Lord moved to Nashville, where he was immediately offered a spot on the Grand Ole Opry. He continued appearing on the Opry well into the 1970s. He recorded for Hickory Records starting in 1961 and Decca Records from 1967. During this time, he also hosted a daily afternoon show on WSM-TV in Nashville, which was the counterpart to Ralph Emery's morning show on that station, Opry Almanac. Under the auspices of WSM-TV, he also hosted a weekly syndicated half-hour program featuring popular country artists. Lord's backing band on the syndicated show included Jerry Byrd on steel guitar, Jerry Whitehurst on piano, and Spider Wilson on guitar.

In 1969, Lord left Nashville and went into semiretirement from the music industry to devote time to his family and his interests in real estate and insurance. In the 1980s, he hosted TNN's program Country Sportsman, later called Celebrity Outdoors, until 1989. He was also the author of the 1969 book, Hit the Glory Road.

Bobby Lord died on February 16, 2008, in Stuart, Florida, at the age of 74. He was a resident of Jensen Beach, Florida, and was survived by his widow, Mozelle, and three children.

== Discography ==
=== Albums ===
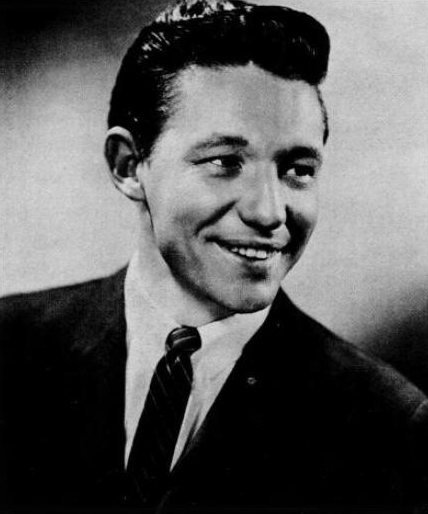
Lord in 1968

Year	Album	Label
1964	Bobby Lord's Best	Harmony
1965	The Bobby Lord Show	Hickory
1970	You and Me Against the World/ Wake Me Up Early in the Morning	Decca

=== Singles ===
Year	Single	Chart Positions		Album
Year	Single	US Country	CAN Country	Album
1955	"No More, No More, No More!"	—	—	singles only
1955	"Ain't You Ever Gonna"	—	—	singles only
1955	"Sittin' Home Prayin'"	—	—	singles only
1955	"Hawkeye"	—	—	singles only
1955	"I Can't Do Without You Anymore"	—	—	singles only
1956	"So Doggone Lonesome"	—	—	singles only
1956	"Beautiful Baby"	—	—	singles only
1956	"Without Your Love"	10	—	singles only
1957	"Your Sweet Love"	—	—	singles only
1957	"High Voltage"	—	—	singles only
1957	"Am I a Fool"	—	—	singles only
1958	"The Fire of Love"	—	—	singles only
1958	"Walking Alone" / "When I've Learned"	—	—	singles only
1959	"Party Pooper"	—	—	singles only
1959	"Too Many Miles"	—	—	singles only
1960	"Give Me a Woman"	—	—	singles only
1960	"Before I Lose My Mind"	—	—	singles only
1961	"Fascination"	—	—	singles only
1961	"I'll Go On Alone"	—	—	The Bobby Lord Show
1962	"The Precious Jewel"	—	—	The Bobby Lord Show
1962	"Don't Shed Any Tears for Me"	—	—	The Bobby Lord Show
1963	"Shopping Center"	—	—	single only
1964	"Life Can Have Meaning"	21	—	The Bobby Lord Show
1964	"Take the Bucket to the Well"	—	—	The Bobby Lord Show
1965	"I'm Going Home Next Summer"	—	—	The Bobby Lord Show
1966	"Cash on the Barrelhead"	—	—	singles only
1966	"It Only Hurts When I'm Laughing"	—	—	singles only
1967	"Look What You're Doing"	—	—	singles only
1967	"One Day Down"	—	—	singles only
1968	"Live Your Life Out Loud"	44	—	You and Me Against the World/ Wake Me Up Early in the Morning
1968	"The True and Lasting Kind"	49	36	You and Me Against the World/ Wake Me Up Early in the Morning
1969	"Yesterday's Letters"	40	—	You and Me Against the World/ Wake Me Up Early in the Morning
1969	"Rainbow Girl"	28	45	You and Me Against the World/ Wake Me Up Early in the Morning
1970	"You and Me Against the World"	15	30	You and Me Against the World/ Wake Me Up Early in the Morning
1970	"Wake Me Up Early in the Morning"	21	32	You and Me Against the World/ Wake Me Up Early in the Morning
1971	"Goodbye Jukebox"	75	—	singles only
1971	"Peace of Mind"	—	—	singles only
1972	"Everybody's Here"	—	—	singles only
1973	"Got Yourself Something"	—	—	singles only
1973	"Hello Wine"	—	—	singles only
1974	"Your Song"	—	—	singles only
