= 1956–57 United States network television schedule =

US primetime television schedule for the fall of 1956

The following is the 1956–57 network television schedule for the three major English language commercial broadcast networks in the United States. The schedule covers primetime hours from September 1956 through March 1957. The schedule is followed by a list per network of returning series, new series, and series cancelled after the 1955–56 season.

This was the first season after DuMont ceased operations, leaving ABC, CBS, and NBC as the only major U.S. television networks (collectively becoming known as the "Big Three") until Fox began airing prime time programming in April 1987.

The 1956–57 network television schedule continued the trend of the previous season, with ABC and CBS scheduling more and more westerns and adventure series during prime time. In addition to its current stable of Westerns, which included Cheyenne, The Lone Ranger, and The Life and Legend of Wyatt Earp, ABC scheduled two new Western TV series: Broken Arrow and The Adventures of Jim Bowie, while CBS added Dick Powell's Zane Grey Theatre to its line-up, which already included Gunsmoke and Sergeant Preston of the Yukon. Castleman and Podrazik (1984) called the rush to schedule Western series on network television during this era "a virtual stampede".

CBS "inherited Sunday afternoon NFL contests from the defunct DuMont network in the fall of 1956". Accordingly, "the expansion into Sunday sports by CBS (and NBC) meant that the traditional afternoon 'egghead' slots for highbrow programming had to be broken up, pushing those shows into the few odd spots still open in the day, or eliminating them completely. This reflected the networks' shift in emphasis during the mid-1950s, slanting television much more toward broad-based popular entertainment. Increasingly, this meant television programming produced in Hollywood [...] In 1957, the amount of prime time programming originating on the West Coast jumped from 40% to 71%." a change in no small part accelerated by the fact DuMont produced a large portion of its programming in Chicago and to a lesser extent Washington in addition to New York.

NBC, behind CBS in the network Nielsen ratings, hired Robert Kintner to revamp NBC's schedule. According to Castleman and Podrazik (1982), NBC's plan was to launch a program which would compete directly with CBS's second most popular series, The Ed Sullivan Show, on Sunday, the most heavily viewed TV night: "Sullivan's show was popular enough to boost the ratings of the programs on both before and after his; as a result, CBS had a chain of hits to begin the evening." NBC's strategy was designed to weaken CBS's Sunday night line-up. NBC's new program, The Steve Allen Show, debuted in the summer to get a head start on the competition. Although the two programs enjoyed a fierce rivalry, Sullivan's program would remain wildly popular, finishing second among all TV programs in the ratings that year, while Allen's show missed the top 30.

Beginning this season, NBC had at least one show in color for every day of the week.

Each of the 30 highest-rated shows is listed with its rank and rating as determined by Nielsen Media Research.

== Legend ==
- Light blue indicates local programming.
- Gray indicates encore programming.
- Blue-gray indicates news programming.
- Light green indicates sporting events.
- Red indicates series being burned off and other irregularly scheduled programs, including specials and movies.
- Light gold indicates programming produced outside of the United States.
- highlight Lime highlights indicates the number-one most watched program of the season.
- highlight Yellow highlights indicates the top-10 most watched programs of the season.
- highlight Cyan highlights indicates numbers 11-20 most watched programs of the season.
- highlight Magenta highlights indicates numbers 21-30 most watched programs of the season.
- highlight Highlights indicates that it falls in multiple of the above categories.

== Schedule ==
- New series are highlighted in **bold**.
- Repeat airings or same-day rebroadcasts are indicated by **(R)**.
- All times are U.S. Eastern and Pacific Time (except for some live sports or events). Subtract one hour for Central, Mountain, Alaska and Hawaii–Aleutian times.

=== Sunday ===
Network	7:00 p.m.	7:30 p.m.	8:00 p.m.	8:30 p.m.	9:00 p.m.	9:30 p.m.	10:00 p.m.	10:30 p.m.
ABC	You Asked for It	The Original Amateur Hour		Press Conference	Omnibus			Local programming
CBS	Lassie (24/29.5)	The Jack Benny Show (10/32.3) / Private Secretary (25/29.0) (Note: Both programs aired on alternating weeks)	The Ed Sullivan Show (2/38.4)		General Electric Theater (3/36.9)	Alfred Hitchcock Presents (6/33.9)	The $64,000 Challenge (22/29.7) (Tied with The Phil Silvers Show)	What's My Line? (26/28.9) (Tied with Climax!)
NBC	**Tales of the 77th Bengal Lancers**	**Circus Boy**	The Steve Allen Show		Goodyear Television Playhouse (In COLOR) / The Alcoa Hour (In COLOR)		The Loretta Young Show	National Bowling Championships

Notes:

- On NBC, Hallmark Hall of Fame (In COLOR) aired as a monthly series, 7:30–9 p.m.
- On CBS, **Air Power**, narrated by Walter Cronkite, aired from 6:30 to 7:30 p.m. on November 11, 1956, and from 6:30 to 7:00 p.m. from November 18, 1956 to May 5, 1957.

=== Monday ===
Network		7:00 p.m.	7:30 p.m.	8:00 p.m.	8:30 p.m.	9:00 p.m.	9:30 p.m.	10:00 p.m.	10:30 p.m.
ABC	Fall	Kukla, Fran and Ollie (7:00) / John Daly and the News (7:15)	**Bold Journey**	The Danny Thomas Show (Note: formerly known as Make Room For Daddy)	The Voice of Firestone	Life Is Worth Living	**Lawrence Welk's Top Tunes and New Talent**		Local programming
ABC	Mid-winter	Kukla, Fran and Ollie (7:00) / John Daly and the News (7:15)	**Wire Service**		The Voice of Firestone	Life Is Worth Living	**Lawrence Welk's Top Tunes and New Talent**		Local programming
CBS	Fall	Local programming (7:00) / Douglas Edwards with the News (7:15) (Note: On CBS, in some areas, Douglas Edwards with the News aired at 6:45 p.m.)	The Adventures of Robin Hood (20/30.3)	The George Burns and Gracie Allen Show (28/27.8)	Arthur Godfrey's Talent Scouts (12/31.9)	I Love Lucy (1/43.7)	December Bride (5/35.2)	Studio One	
CBS	Summer	Local programming (7:00) / Douglas Edwards with the News (7:15)	The Adventures of Robin Hood (20/30.3)	The George Burns and Gracie Allen Show (28/27.8)	**Richard Diamond, Private Detective**	I Love Lucy (1/43.7)	December Bride (5/35.2)	Studio One	
NBC	Fall	Local programming	The Golden Touch of Frankie Carle (7:30) / **Huntley-Brinkley Report** (7:45)	**The Adventures of Sir Lancelot** (Sporadically in COLOR)	**Stanley**	Medic	Robert Montgomery Presents (In COLOR)		Local programming
NBC	Spring	Local programming	The Golden Touch of Frankie Carle (7:30) / **Huntley-Brinkley Report** (7:45)	**The Adventures of Sir Lancelot** (Sporadically in COLOR)	**Tales of Wells Fargo**	Medic	Robert Montgomery Presents (In COLOR)		Local programming

Notes:

- On NBC, Producers' Showcase (COLOR) aired as a monthly series, from 8–9:30 p.m.
- On March 18, 1957, the popular Western series **Tales of Wells Fargo** debuted, replacing Stanley Monday nights on NBC at 8:30 PM EST.
- From July 1 to September 23, 1957, the summer series **Richard Diamond, Private Detective**, starring David Janssen, aired on CBS at 8:30-9 p.m. It returned for a second irregular season on the CBS Thursday schedule from January 2 to June 26, 1958.

=== Tuesday ===
Network		7:00 p.m.	7:30 p.m.	8:00 p.m.	8:30 p.m.	9:00 p.m.	9:30 p.m.	10:00 p.m.	10:30 p.m.
ABC		Kukla, Fran and Ollie (7:00) / John Daly and the News (7:15)	Cheyenne / **Conflict**		The Life and Legend of Wyatt Earp (18/31.0)	**Broken Arrow**	Du Pont Theater	It's Polka Time	Local programming
CBS		Local programming (7:00) / Douglas Edwards with the News (7:15)	Name That Tune (30/27.2)	The Phil Silvers Show (22/29.7) (Tied with The $64,000 Challenge)	**The Brothers**	**The Herb Shriner Show**	The Red Skelton Show (In COLOR)(15/31.4) (Tied with The Lineup)	The $64,000 Question (4/36.4)	Do You Trust Your Wife?
NBC	Fall	Local programming	**The Jonathan Winters Show** (7:30) / **Huntley-Brinkley Report** (7:45)	The Big Surprise	**Noah's Ark** (In COLOR)	The Jane Wyman Show	Armstrong Circle Theatre / The Kaiser Aluminum Hour		Break the $250,000 Bank (In COLOR)
NBC	Spring	Local programming	**The Jonathan Winters Show** (7:30) / **Huntley-Brinkley Report** (7:45)	The Big Surprise	**Panic!**	The Jane Wyman Show	Armstrong Circle Theatre / The Kaiser Aluminum Hour		Break the $250,000 Bank (In COLOR)
NBC	Summer	Local programming	**The Andy Williams and** **June Valli Show** (7:30) / **Huntley-Brinkley Report** (7:45)	The Big Surprise	**Panic!**	The Jane Wyman Show	Summer Playhouse (R)	**The Nat King Cole Show**	Break the $250,000 Bank (In COLOR)

Notes:

- On March 5, 1957, the suspense drama **Panic!** replaced **Noah's Ark**, a Jack Webb production, on the NBC schedule.
- On NBC, Summer Playhouse was a summer anthology series made up of reruns of episodes of other anthology series.

=== Wednesday ===
Network		7:00 p.m.	7:30 p.m.	8:00 p.m.	8:30 p.m.	9:00 p.m.	9:30 p.m.	10:00 p.m.	10:30 p.m.
ABC		Kukla, Fran and Ollie (7:00) / John Daly and the News (7:15)	Disneyland (13/31.8) (Tied with The Millionaire)		Navy Log	The Adventures of Ozzie and Harriet	Ford Theatre	The Wednesday Night Fights	
CBS	Fall	Local programming (7:00) / Douglas Edwards with the News (7:15)	Pick the Winner	The Arthur Godfrey Show (Sporadically in COLOR) (Note: Formerly Arthur Godfrey and His Friends)		The Millionaire (13/31.8) (Tied with Disneyland)	I've Got a Secret (7/32.7) (Tied with Gunsmoke)	The United States Steel Hour / The 20th Century Fox Hour	
CBS	November	Local programming (7:00) / Douglas Edwards with the News (7:15)	**Giant Step**	The Arthur Godfrey Show (Sporadically in COLOR)		The Millionaire (13/31.8) (Tied with Disneyland)	I've Got a Secret (7/32.7) (Tied with Gunsmoke)	The United States Steel Hour / The 20th Century Fox Hour	
CBS	Summer	Local programming (7:00) / Douglas Edwards with the News (7:15)	My Friend Flicka (R)	The Vic Damone Show		The Millionaire (13/31.8) (Tied with Disneyland)	I've Got a Secret (7/32.7) (Tied with Gunsmoke)	The United States Steel Hour / The 20th Century Fox Hour	
NBC		Local programming	Coke Time with Eddie Fisher (7:30) / **Huntley-Brinkley Report** (7:45)	**The Adventures of Hiram Holliday**	Father Knows Best	Kraft Television Theatre (In COLOR)		This Is Your Life	**Twenty-One**

Note:

- On CBS, Pick the Winner aired as an interim U.S. election coverage series in September and October from 7:30 to 8 p.m. It previously had aired in 1952.

=== Thursday ===
Network		7:00 p.m.	7:30 p.m.	8:00 p.m.	8:30 p.m.	9:00 p.m.	9:30 p.m.	10:00 p.m.	10:30 p.m.
ABC	Fall	Kukla, Fran and Ollie (7:00) / John Daly and the News (7:15)	The Lone Ranger	**Circus Time**		**Wire Service**		Ozark Jubilee	
ABC	December	Kukla, Fran and Ollie (7:00) / John Daly and the News (7:15)	The Lone Ranger	**Circus Time**		**Wire Service**		**Air Time '57**	Local programming
ABC	Mid-winter	Kukla, Fran and Ollie (7:00) / John Daly and the News (7:15)	The Lone Ranger	**Circus Time**		The Danny Thomas Show	**Bold Journey**	**Air Time '57**	Local programming
ABC	Spring	Kukla, Fran and Ollie (7:00) / John Daly and the News (7:15)	The Lone Ranger	**Circus Time**		The Danny Thomas Show	**Bold Journey**	**Telephone Time**	Local programming
ABC	Summer	Kukla, Fran and Ollie (7:00) / John Daly and the News (7:15)	The Lone Ranger	**Cowtown Rodeo**		The Danny Thomas Show	Compass / Industries for America (Note: On ABC, Compass and Industries for America shared the 9:30–10:00 p.m. time slot from June to July 1957. Compass aired only in markets where the local affiliate did not choose to air local programming. Industries for America continued to air in the time slot until September 1957.)	Focus	Local programming
CBS		Local programming (7:00) / Douglas Edwards with the News (7:15)	Sergeant Preston of the Yukon	The Bob Cummings Show	Climax! (26/28.9) (Tied with What's My Line?) (In COLOR)		**Playhouse 90**		
NBC	Fall	Local programming	The Dinah Shore Show (7:30) / **Huntley-Brinkley Report** (7:45)	You Bet Your Life (17/31.1)	Dragnet (11/32.1)	The People's Choice	**The Ford Show** (19/30.7)	Lux Video Theatre (In COLOR)	
NBC	Summer	Local programming	**The Andy Williams and** **June Valli Show** (7:30) / **Huntley-Brinkley Report** (7:45)	You Bet Your Life (17/31.1)	Dragnet (11/32.1)	The People's Choice	**The Ford Show** (19/30.7)	Lux Video Theatre (In COLOR)	

Note:

- On CBS, Shower of Stars (In COLOR) aired once a month, 8:30–9:30 p.m.

=== Friday ===
Network		7:00 p.m.	7:30 p.m.	8:00 p.m.	8:30 p.m.	9:00 p.m.	9:30 p.m.	10:00 p.m.	10:30 p.m.
ABC	Fall	Kukla, Fran and Ollie (7:00) / John Daly and the News (7:15)	The Adventures of Rin Tin Tin	**The Adventures of Jim Bowie**	Crossroads	**Treasure Hunt**	The Vise	**The Ray Anthony Show**	
ABC	Spring	Kukla, Fran and Ollie (7:00) / John Daly and the News (7:15)	The Adventures of Rin Tin Tin	**The Adventures of Jim Bowie**	Crossroads	**Treasure Hunt**	The Vise	**The Ray Anthony Show**	Date with the Angels
ABC	Summer	Kukla, Fran and Ollie (7:00) / John Daly and the News (7:15)	The Adventures of Rin Tin Tin	**The Adventures of Jim Bowie**	Crossroads	**Treasure Hunt**	The Vise	**The Big Beat**	Date with the Angels
CBS	Fall	Local programming (7:00) / Douglas Edwards with the News (7:15)	My Friend Flicka	**The West Point Story**	**Dick Powell's Zane Grey Theatre**	Crusader	Schlitz Playhouse (Note: Formerly Schlitz Playhouse Of Stars)	The Lineup (15/31.4) (Tied with The Red Skelton Show)	Person to Person
CBS	Winter	Local programming (7:00) / Douglas Edwards with the News (7:15)	My Friend Flicka	**The West Point Story**	**Dick Powell's Zane Grey Theatre**	**Mr. Adams and Eve**	Schlitz Playhouse	The Lineup (15/31.4) (Tied with The Red Skelton Show)	Person to Person
CBS	Late winter	Local programming (7:00) / Douglas Edwards with the News (7:15)	Various specials	**The West Point Story**	**Dick Powell's Zane Grey Theatre**	**Mr. Adams and Eve**	Schlitz Playhouse	The Lineup (15/31.4) (Tied with The Red Skelton Show)	Person to Person
DMN	Fall	Local programming			**Ethel Barrymore Theatre** (Note: It is disputed between television historians if the Ethel Barrymore Theatre was networked by the by now moribund DuMont Television Network or if it was merely syndicated)	Local programming			
DMN	Winter	Local programming							
NBC	Fall	Local programming	Coke Time with Eddie Fisher (7:30) / **Huntley-Brinkley Report** (7:45)	The Life of Riley (Sporadically in COLOR)	**The Walter Winchell Show**	The Joseph Cotten Show (Note: Formerly known as On Trial)	The Big Story	Gillette Cavalcade of Sports (10:00) / Red Barber's Corner (10:45) (In COLOR)	
NBC	Spring	Local programming	Coke Time with Eddie Fisher (7:30) / **Huntley-Brinkley Report** (7:45)	**Blondie**	**The Walter Winchell Show**	The Joseph Cotten Show	The Big Story	Gillette Cavalcade of Sports (10:00) / Red Barber's Corner (10:45) (In COLOR)	
NBC	Summer	Local programming	Coke Time with Eddie Fisher (7:30) / **Huntley-Brinkley Report** (7:45)	**Blondie**	**The Walter Winchell Show**	The Joseph Cotten Show	**The Big Moment**	Gillette Cavalcade of Sports (10:00) / Red Barber's Corner (10:45) (In COLOR)	

Notes:

- On CBS, **Mr. Adams and Eve** premiered on January 4, 1957.
- On NBC, **The Dinah Shore Chevy Show** (In COLOR) aired once a month, 10–11 p.m.

=== Saturday ===
Network		7:00 p.m.	7:30 p.m.	8:00 p.m.	8:30 p.m.	9:00 p.m.	9:30 p.m.	10:00 p.m.	10:30 p.m.
ABC	Fall	Local programming	Famous Film Festival			Lawrence Welk's Dodge Dancing Party		Masquerade Party	Local programming
ABC	Summer	Local programming	Famous Film Festival			**The Billy Graham Crusade**		Masquerade Party	Local programming
CBS	Fall	Beat the Clock	**The Buccaneers**	The Jackie Gleason Show (29/27.6)		**The Gale Storm Show**	**Hey, Jeannie!**	Gunsmoke (7/32.7) (Tied with I've Got a Secret)	High Finance
CBS	Winter	Beat the Clock	**The Buccaneers**	The Jackie Gleason Show (29/27.6)		**The Gale Storm Show**	**Hey, Jeannie!**	Gunsmoke (7/32.7) (Tied with I've Got a Secret)	Local programming
CBS	Spring	My Friend Flicka (R)	**The Buccaneers**	The Jackie Gleason Show (29/27.6)		**The Gale Storm Show**	**Hey, Jeannie!**	Gunsmoke (7/32.7) (Tied with I've Got a Secret)	Local programming
CBS	Mid-spring	Beat the Clock	**The Buccaneers**	The Jackie Gleason Show (29/27.6)		**The Gale Storm Show**	**Hey, Jeannie!**	Gunsmoke (7/32.7) (Tied with I've Got a Secret)	Local programming
CBS	Summer	Beat the Clock	**The Buccaneers**	The Jackie Gleason Show (29/27.6)		**The Gale Storm Show**	**Hey, Jeannie!**	Gunsmoke (7/32.7) (Tied with I've Got a Secret)	**The Jimmy Dean Show**
NBC	Fall	Local programming	People Are Funny (21/30.2)	The Perry Como Show (9/32.6) (In COLOR)		Caesar's Hour		The George Gobel Show	Your Hit Parade (In COLOR)
NBC	Summer	Local programming	People Are Funny (21/30.2)	The Julius LaRosa Show (In COLOR)		**The George Sanders Mystery Theater**	Dollar a Second	Encore Theatre (R)	Adventure Theater
NBC	Mid-summer	Local programming	People Are Funny (21/30.2)	The Julius LaRosa Show (In COLOR)		**The George Sanders Mystery Theater**	Various programming	Dollar a Second	Adventure Theater

Notes:

- On NBC, **Saturday Color Carnival** (COLOR) aired as a monthly series, 9:00–10:30 p.m.
- The 1957 version of the NBC summer series Encore Theatre consisted of reruns of episodes of Ford Theatre.

== By network ==
=== ABC ===
Returning Series

- The Adventures of Ozzie and Harriet
- The Adventures of Rin-Tin-Tin
- Break the Bank
- Cheyenne
- Compass
- Crossroads
- The Danny Thomas Show
- Disneyland
- Dollar a Second
- Du Pont Theater
- Famous Film Festival
- Focus
- Ford Theatre
- Industries for America
- It's Polka Time
- John Daly and the News
- Kukla, Fran and Ollie
- Lawrence Welk's Dodge Dancing Party
- The Life and Legend of Wyatt Earp
- Life Is Worth Living
- The Lone Ranger
- Masquerade Party
- Navy Log (moved from CBS)
- Omnibus (moved from CBS)
- The Original Amateur Hour
- Ozark Jubilee
- Press Conference (moved from NBC)
- Telephone Time (moved from CBS)
- The Vise
- The Voice of Firestone
- The Wednesday Night Fights
- You Asked for It

New Series

- The Adventures of Jim Bowie
- Air Time '57 *
- The Big Beat *
- The Billy Graham Crusade *
- Bold Journey *
- Broken Arrow
- Circus Time
- Conflict
- Date with the Angels *
- The Gale Storm Show
- Lawrence Welk's Top Tunes and New Talent
- Open Hearing *
- The Ray Anthony Show
- Treasure Hunt
- Wire Service

Not returning from 1955–56:

- The Big Picture
- Casablanca
- Chance of a Lifetime
- Combat Sergeant
- The Dotty Mack Show
- Down You Go
- Ethel and Albert
- G.E. Summer Originals
- Grand Ole Opry
- King's Row
- Life Begins at Eighty
- Medical Horizons
- MGM Parade
- Outside U.S.A.
- Paris Precinct
- Star Tonight
- Stop the Music
- Talent Varieties
- Tomorrow's Careers
- TV Reader's Digest
- Warner Brothers Presents

=== CBS ===
Returning Series

- The 20th Century Fox Hour
- The $64,000 Challenge
- The $64,000 Question
- The Adventures of Robin Hood
- Alfred Hitchcock Presents
- Arthur Godfrey's Talent Scouts
- Arthur Godfrey and His Friends
- Beat the Clock
- The Bob Cummings Show
- Climax!
- Crusader
- December Bride
- Do You Trust Your Wife?
- The Ed Sullivan Show
- General Electric Theater
- The George Burns and Gracie Allen Show
- Gunsmoke
- High Finance
- I Love Lucy
- I've Got a Secret
- The Jack Benny Show
- Joe and Mabel
- Lassie
- The Lineup
- The Millionaire
- My Friend Flicka
- Person to Person
- Pick the Winner
- Private Secretary
- The Red Skelton Show
- Schlitz Playhouse of Stars
- Sergeant Preston of the Yukon
- Shower of Stars
- Studio One
- The United States Steel Hour
- What's My Line?

New Series

- The Brothers
- The Buccaneers
- Dick Powell's Zane Grey Theatre
- Dr. Christian
- The Gale Storm Show
- Giant Step *
- The Herb Shriner Show
- Hey, Jeannie!
- The Jimmy Dean Show *
- Mr. Adams and Eve *
- Playhouse 90
- Richard Diamond, Private Detective *
- The Spike Jones Show *
- To Tell the Truth *
- The Vincent Lopez Show *
- The West Point Story
- You're on Your Own *

Not returning from 1955–56:

- The Adventures of Champion
- Brave Eagle
- CBS Cartoon Theatre
- Damon Runyon Theater
- Four Star Playhouse
- The Gene Autry Show
- Hollywood Summer Theater
- The Honeymooners
- It's Always Jan
- The Johnny Carson Show
- Mama (moved to Sunday afternoons)
- Meet Millie
- My Favorite Husband
- Our Miss Brooks
- Shower of Stars
- Stage Show
- Two for the Money
- Wanted

=== DuMont ===
New series

- Ethel Barrymore Theatre

Not returning from 1955-56

- At Ringside
- Boxing from St. Nicholas Arena
- Hollywood Preview
- What's the Story

=== NBC ===
Returning Series

- The Alcoa Hour
- Armstrong Circle Theatre
- The Big Story
- The Big Surprise
- Break the $250,000 Bank
- Caesar's Hour
- Coke Time with Eddie Fisher
- The Dinah Shore Show
- Dollar a Second
- Dragnet
- Father Knows Best
- The George Gobel Show
- Gillette Cavalcade of Sports
- The Golden Touch of Frankie Carle
- Goodyear Television Playhouse
- The Jane Wyman Show
- The Julius LaRosa Show
- The Kaiser Aluminum Hour
- Kraft Television Theatre
- The Life of Riley
- The Loretta Young Show
- Lux Video Theatre
- Medic
- National Bowling Championships
- People Are Funny
- The People's Choice
- The Perry Como Show
- Producers' Showcase
- Red Barber's Corner
- Robert Montgomery Presents
- Summer Playhouse (last aired in 1954)
- This Is Your Life
- Wide Wide World
- You Bet Your Life
- Your Hit Parade

New Series

- The Adventures of Hiram Holliday
- The Big Moment *
- Blondie *
- Circus Boy
- The Dinah Shore Chevy Show
- The Ford Show
- The George Sanders Mystery Theater *
- The Huntley–Brinkley Report
- The Jonathan Winters Show
- The Joseph Cotten Show
- The Nat King Cole Show
- Noah's Ark
- Panic! *
- Saturday Color Carnival *
- Stanley
- Tales of the 77th Bengal Lancers
- Tales of Wells Fargo *
- Twenty-One
- The Web *

Not returning from 1955–56:

- Adventure Theater
- The Best in Mystery
- Big Town
- Camel News Caravan
- Dear Phoebe (repeats)
- Frontier
- Hollywood Today
- It's a Great Life
- Justice
- The Martha Raye Show
- Max Liebman Presents
- The Milton Berle Show
- The NBC Comedy Hour
- Screen Directors Playhouse
- Sneak Preview
- Star Stage
- The Tony Martin Show
- Truth or Consequences

Note: The * indicates that the program was introduced in midseason.

== See also ==
- 1956–57 United States network television schedule (daytime)
- 1956–57 United States network television schedule (late night)
