= Top-rated United States television programs of 1956–57 =

This table displays the top-rated primetime television series of the 1956–57 season as measured by Nielsen Media Research.

Rank	Program	Network	Rating
1	I Love Lucy	CBS	43.7
2	The Ed Sullivan Show	CBS	38.4
3	General Electric Theater	CBS	36.9
4	The $64,000 Question	CBS	36.4
5	December Bride	CBS	35.2
6	Alfred Hitchcock Presents	CBS	33.9
7	I've Got a Secret	CBS	32.7
7	Gunsmoke	CBS	32.7
9	The Perry Como Show	NBC	32.6
10	The Jack Benny Show	CBS	32.3
11	Dragnet	NBC	32.1
12	Arthur Godfrey's Talent Scouts	CBS	31.9
13	The Millionaire	CBS	31.8
13	Disneyland	ABC	31.8
15	The Red Skelton Show	CBS	31.4
15	The Lineup	CBS	31.4
17	You Bet Your Life	NBC	31.1
18	The Life and Legend of Wyatt Earp	ABC	31.0
19	The Ford Show	NBC	30.7
20	The Adventures of Robin Hood	CBS	30.3
21	People Are Funny	NBC	30.2
22	The $64,000 Challenge	CBS	29.7
22	The Phil Silvers Show	CBS	29.7
24	Lassie	CBS	29.5
25	Private Secretary	CBS	29.0
26	Climax!	CBS	28.9
26	What's My Line?	CBS	28.9
28	The George Burns and Gracie Allen Show	CBS	27.8
29	The Jackie Gleason Show	CBS	27.6
30	Name That Tune	CBS	27.2
