= Wire Service =

American TV drama series (1956–1957)

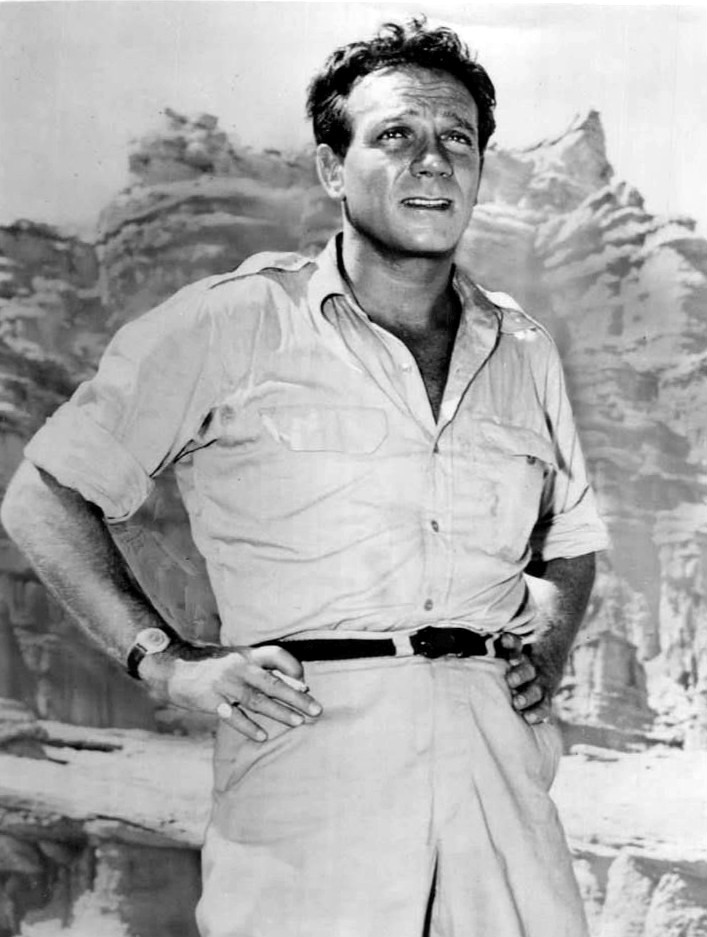
- Dane Clark as Dan Miller, 1956.
- Also known as: Deadline for Action
- Genre: Drama
- Written by: Al C. Ward; Frederick Brady
- Directed by: Lance Comfort; Tom Gries
- Starring: Dane Clark; George Brent; Mercedes McCambridge
- Country of origin: United States
- Original language: English
- No. of seasons: 1
- No. of episodes: 39

Production
- Executive producers: Warren Lewis; Don Sharpe
- Producer: Buck Houghton
- Running time: 45–48 minutes
- Production company: Desilu Productions

Original release
- Network: ABC
- Release: October 4, 1956 – June 17, 1957

Wire Service is an American television drama series that aired on ABC as part of its 1956–57 season lineup.

== Synopsis ==
Wire Service focuses on three reporters for the fictional Trans Globe wire service, which was similar to (and obviously inspired by) real-life news wire services such as the Associated Press and United Press International. It was the first hour-long, weekly scheduled dramatic series with continuing characters to last a full season on network television. However, the three reporters functioned independently of each other, meaning that the series was essentially three different ones sharing a time slot and title.

This program was aired at 9 p.m. (Eastern Time) Thursdays from September 1956 to February 1957, when it was moved to Mondays at 8:30. It was not renewed for a second season, and the last prime time broadcast under this title was in September 1957. However, when a gap developed in the ABC schedule in February 1959, the episodes starring Dane Clark (only) were then rebroadcast under the title Deadline for Action. The last of these repeat episodes was broadcast on September 13, 1959.

The series sometimes delved into topics that were controversial for its era. They included profiteering, nuclear testing, and prison reform.

== Cast ==
- Dane Clark as Dan Miller
- George Brent as Dean Evans
- Mercedes McCambridge as Katherine Wells

== Episodes ==
Episode #	Episode Title	Director	Writer	Original Airdate
1	"The Blood Rock Mine"	Alvin Ganzer	Al C. Ward	October 4, 1956
2	"Campaign Train"	Tom Gries	Story by : Gordon and Mildred Gordon; Teleplay by : Frederick Brady	October 11, 1956
3	"Hideout"	Alvin Ganzer	Story by : Teleplay by : Gabrielle Upton	October 18, 1956
4	"The Johnny Rath Story"	Robert Florey	Story by : Al C. Ward; Teleplay by : Frederick Brady	October 25, 1956
5	"Night of August 7th"	Alvin Ganzer	Al C. Ward	November 1, 1956
6	"Conspiracy"	Reginald LeBorg	Seeleg Lester	November 8, 1956
7	"The Tower"	Reginald LeBorg	Story by : Merwin Gerard; Teleplay by : James Edmiston and Merwin Gerard	November 15, 1956
8	"Deported"	Tom Gries	Story by : Joel Kane; Teleplay by : Jack Jacobs, Joel Kane, and Malvin Wald	November 22, 1956
9	"Until I Die"	TBA	Gabrielle Upton	November 29, 1956
10	"The Avengers"	TBA	Malvin Wald and Jack Jacobs	December 6, 1956
11	"The Deep End"	Tom Gries	Story by : Fredric Brown; Teleplay by : James Edmiston	December 12, 1956
12	"High Adventure"	TBA	TBA	December 20, 1956
13	"Chicago Exclusive"	Alvin Ganzer	Story by : Steve Fisher; Teleplay by : Steve Fisher	January 3, 1957
14	"World of the Lonely"	Tony Leader	Gabrielle Upton	January 10, 1957
15	"The Third Inevitable"	John Peyser	Frank L. Moss	January 17, 1957
16	"Flowers for the General"	Alvin Ganzer	László Görög	January 24, 1957
17	"The Comeback"	Reginald LeBorg	Samuel Elkin	January 31, 1957
18	"Atom at Spithead"	Lance Comfort	Story by : Teleplay by : Frederic Brady	February 11, 1957
19	"El Hombre"	Alvin Ganzer	Story by : Richard M. Bluel and M.L. Lynn; Teleplay by : Frederic Brady	February 18, 1957
20	"Profile of Ellen Gale"	Reginald LeBorg	John Copeland	February 25, 1957
21	"Dateline Las Vegas"	Reginald LeBorg	Al C. Ward	March 4, 1957
22	"Forbidden Ground"	Tom Gries	Story by : Malvin Wald, Jack Jacobs, and Seeleg Lester; Teleplay by : Jack Jacobs and Malvin Wald	March 11, 1957
23	"No Peace in Lo Dao"	Reginald LeBorg	Story by : Lowell Barrington; Teleplay by : Elliot West and Lowell Barrington	March 18, 1957
24	"A Matter of Conscience"	Harold Schuster	Stephen Thornley	March 25, 1957
25	"Misfire"	Tom Gries	Story by : Daniel Mainwaring; Teleplay by : Wilton Schiller	April 1, 1957
26	"The Indictment"	Tony Leader	Seeleg Lester	April 8, 1957
27	"Ninety and Nine"	Harold Schuster	James Edmiston	April 15, 1957
28	"The Oil Man"	Tom Gries	David Chandler and Lowell Barrington	April 22, 1957
29	"Run, Sheep, Run"	Tony Leader	W.R. Harris and Frederic Brady	April 29, 1957
30	"The Death Merchant"	Michael McCarthy	Story by : Jack Laird; Teleplay by : Marc Brandel	May 6, 1957
31	"Violence Preferred"	Tom Gries	Stanley Niss & Lowell Barrington	May 13, 1957
32	"The Last Laugh"	Tony Leader	Andrew Solt and Glen Bohannan	May 20, 1957
33	"Confirm or Deny"	Harold Schuster	John Michael Hayes and E. Jack Neuman	May 27, 1957
34	"Four Minutes to Shot"	Tom Gries	Frank and Doris Hursley	June 3, 1957
35	"The Washington Stars aka The Washington Story"	TBA	TBA	June 10, 1957
36	"A Death at Twin Pines"	Harold Schuster	Story by : Harold Channing Wire; Teleplay by : A.I. Bezzerides	June 17, 1957
37	"The Nameless"	TBA	TBA	September 9, 1957
38	"Rehearsal for Sabotage"	TBA	TBA	September 16, 1957
39	"Escape to Freedom"	TBA	Malvin Wald and Jack Jacobs	September 23, 1957

== Production ==
The producers were Don Sharpe and Warren Lewis. Directors included Lance Comfort. Some episodes were filmed in England. Wire Service initially was broadcast at 9 p.m. Eastern Time on Thursdays. Beginning on February 11, 1957, it was moved to Mondays at 7:30 p.m. ET. R. J. Reynolds Tobacco Company was the sponsor.

The program was produced by Desilu Productions at Desilu Studios in Hollywood, California.

== Home video ==
A DVD set, Wire Service Volume 1, was released by Alpha Video on March 1, 2016.
