= Joan Barton (actress) =

American actress (1925–1976)

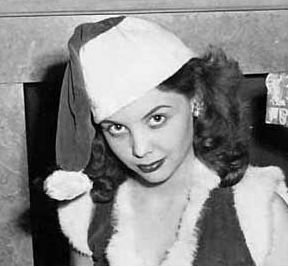
- Barton circa 1946
- Born: Mary Ann Bock; September 20, 1925
- Died: August 27, 1976 (aged 50)
- Occupation: Actress
- Years active: 1946–1952
- Spouses: James Erwin Thomas (div. 1946) F. S. Guggenhelmer (div. 1950) Earl Muntz (m. 1950; div. 1955): Jerry Gray
- Children: 1

Joan Barton (born Mary Ann Bock; September 20, 1925 – August 27, 1976 ) was an American actress, best known for starring in Mary Lou (1948).

== Early years ==
Barton was born Mary Ann Bock, the daughter of Mr. and Mrs. William E. Bock. She was from McKeesport, Pennsylvania. Her father was an attorney, and her mother was an actress whose stage name was Sara Snyder. A whistling star who learned that Barton had a talent for throat whistling gave her lessons when she was a teenager, after which she and her parents went to Hollywood.

== Career ==
In 1946, Barton first appeared in Romance of the West as Melodie and in Lone Star Moonlight later that year. Her first prominent appearance was in Angel and the Badman (1947) with John Wayne and Gail Russell. She also made an appearance in Cigarette Girl (1947). Barton was cast as a lead in musical Mary Lou (1948). She appeared in Strange Gamble (1948).

Television series on which she appeared included Toast of the Town and A Couple of Joes.

From 1951 to 1952, Barton made five uncredited appearances in various films, including Million Dollar Mermaid (1952).

== Personal life ==
On May 25, 1946, Barton was divorced from James Erwin Thomas. Barton's marriage to jeweler F. S. Guggenhelmer ended in divorce in 1950. She married businessman Earl Muntz on September 25, 1950, in Las Vegas. They had a daughter Tee Vee (better known as "Teena") in 1953. She was divorced from Muntz on February 16, 1955. She married actor Doye O'Dell in 1955. Muntz contemplated attending their wedding reception, but decided against it at the last minute. She then married Jerry Gray and they remained together until her death in 1976.

== Filmography ==
Year	Title	Role	Notes
1946	Romance of the West	Melodie	
1946	Lone Star Moonlight	Jean White	
1947	Angel and the Badman	Lila Neal	
1947	Cigarette Girl	Glenda Paige	
1948	Mary Lou	Ann Parker/Mary Lou	
1948	Strange Gamble	Mary Murray	
1949	A Couple of Joes		Television Series
1951	Two Tickets to Broadway	Showgirl	Uncredited
1951	The Lady Says No		Uncredited
1952	Aladdin and His Lamp	Harem Girl	Uncredited
1952	Glory Alley	Chorus Girl	Uncredited
1952	Million Dollar Mermaid	Swimmer	Uncredited
