= The George Sanders Mystery Theater =

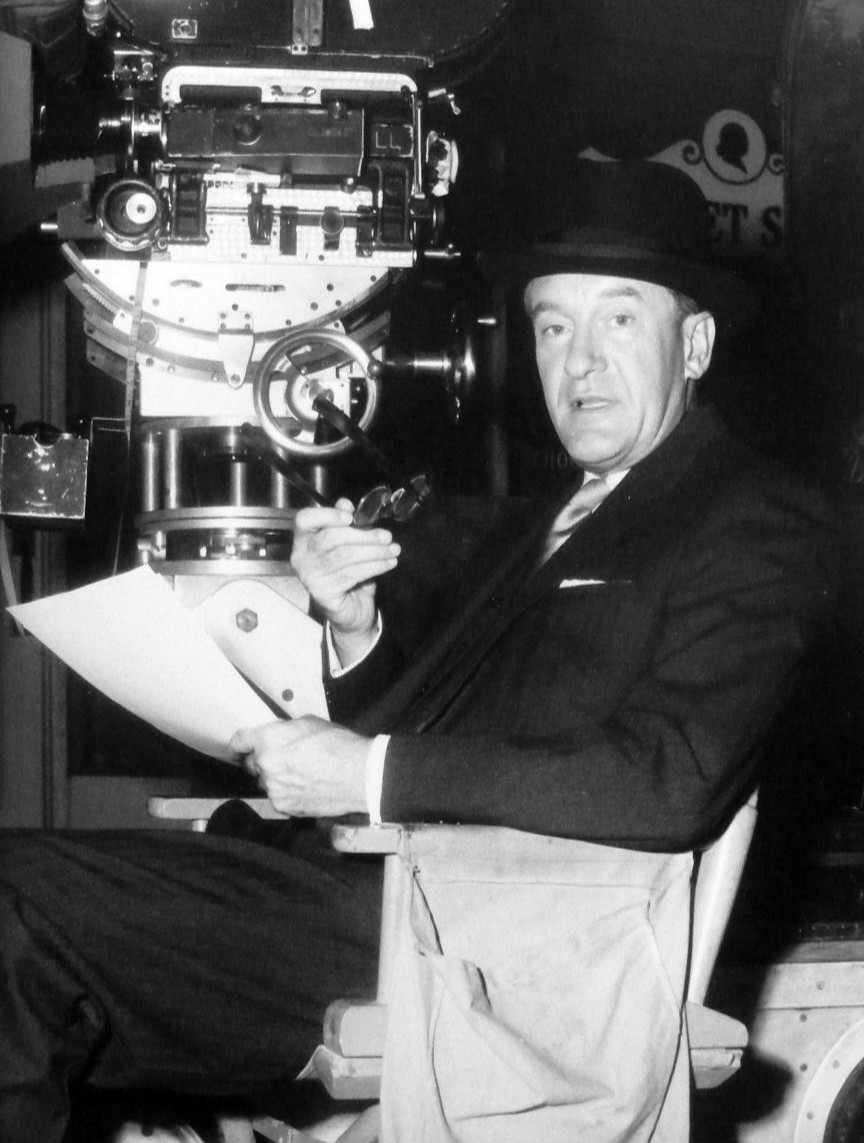
- Sanders as the host of the show.
- Genre: Mystery drama
- Directed by: Fletcher Markle
- Presented by: George Sanders
- Country of origin: United States
- Original language: English
- No. of seasons: 1
- No. of episodes: 13

Production
- Producer: Screen Gems
- Camera setup: Single-camera
- Running time: 24 mins.

Original release
- Network: NBC
- Release: June 22 – September 14, 1957

The George Sanders Mystery Theater is the title of a 30-minute American television mystery drama series hosted by character actor George Sanders which aired Sundays on NBC from June 22, 1957, to September 14, 1957, replacing the first half of Caesar's Hour.

== Overview ==
In addition to being the host of the series, Sanders acted in some episodes. Other actors who were cast in the episodes included: Lyle Talbot, June Vincent, S. John Launer, Paul Petersen, John Archer, Robert Horton, Kathryn Crosby, Elisha Cook, Mae Clarke, and Marion Ross.

== Production ==
Work on the program, which had the working title The Mystery Writers Theater of TV, began two years prior to its debut. After Sanders was signed to be host, the title was changed to use his name. He began working on episodes 16 months prior to the show's debut.

The producers were Sam Bischoff and David Diamond for Screen Gems. Pabst Beer was the sponsor. The show was broadcast on Saturdays from 9 to 9:30 p.m. Eastern Time.

== Episodes ==
| No. | Title | Directed By | Written By | Cast |
|---|---|---|---|---|
| 1 | Man in the Elevator | Fletcher Markle | Leonard Lee | Don Haggerty, Dorothy Green, and Paul Peterson |
| 2 | And the Birds Still Sing | Gerd Oswald | Gene Wang | Tristram Coffin, Havis Davenport, John Beradino, and Richard Benedict |
| 3 | The Call | Fletcher Markle | Halsted Welles | Adam Williams and Marshall Bradford |
| 4 | You Don't Live Here | Fletcher Markle | Eugene Francis | Marion Ross, Jim Hayward, Alex Gerry, Peter M. Thompson, and Freeman Morse |
| 5 | Last Will and Testament | James Neilson | Jerome Bromfield | Robert Horton, Dolores Donlon, Herb Butterfield, Ray Gordon, George Eldredge, and Joseph Hamilton |
| 6 | The Liar | Fletcher Markle | Halsted Welles from a story by Charlotte Armstrong | Robert Nichols, Richard Devon, Marvin Press, Ray Buckley, Nolan Leary, and Kathleen Mulgreen |
| 7 | Broker's Special | Fletcher Markle | Melvin Wald and Jack Jacobs | George Sanders, Mary Lawrence, Grant Richards, Lyle Talbot, and Diana Damis |
| 8 | Try It My Way | Fletcher Markle | Whitfield Cook from a story by Frederick Nebel | Howard Wendell, Phil Arnold, and Gilbert Frye |
| 9 | Round Trip | Fletcher Markle | Charles Faber | Pamela Duncan, Roger Smith, Ella Ethridge, Russ Bender, and Paul Harber |
| 10 | Love Has No Alibi | John Meredyth Lucas | Steve Fisher based on the novel by Octavus Roy Cohen | William Leslie, Kathryn Grant, Don Haggerty, S. John Launer, Paul Haber, and Jack W. Harris |
| 11 | The Night I Died | Fletcher Markle | Brainerd Duffield based on a story by Cornell Woolrich | Paul Gary, Benny Rubin, Howard McNear, Eve McVeagh, Scotty Beckett, and Ted Jacques |
| 12 | Morning Boat to Africa | Oscar Randolph | Maury Hill | George Sanders, Valerie French, and Peter Adams |
| 13 | The People vs. Anne Tobin | Gerd Oswald | Robert P. Presnell Jr. | Arthur Franz, June Vincent, Reba Tassell, Robert Quarry, and Paul Keast |

== See also ==
- 1956-57 United States network television schedule
