= Famous Film Festival =

Famous Film Festival is American television's first prime-time movie series. It aired Sunday nights 7:30-9:00 pm (EST) on ABC during the 1955-56 television season, switching to Saturday nights (7:30-9:00 pm) during its second and final season, 1956-57.

In 1955, ABC obtained permission to broadcast 35 British movies, the rights of which were owned by English film mogul J. Arthur Rank. Titles of these included The Man in Grey (1943), The Lavender Hill Mob (1951), Odd Man Out (1947), Caesar and Cleopatra (1945), The Red Shoes (1948), and Hamlet (1948). However, many of these, such as Hamlet, ran two full hours or longer and were either drastically cut to fit a ninety-minute time slot or shown in two installments a week apart. It was not until November 3, 1956, with CBS's first presentation of MGM's The Wizard of Oz (1939), where an uncut film lasting more than ninety minutes was telecast in one evening on a television network.

ABC broadcast all Famous Film entries in black-and-white, despite several of them being photographed and exhibited theatrically in color. Thus, such films as Stairway to Heaven (1946) and The Life and Death of Colonel Blimp (1943) would not be seen by American viewers in color until years later when they were released for exhibition by local and independent television stations.

Other British films from Rank Film Distributors obtained at the same time—including those from Ealing Rank still controlled the distribution rights before they were sold to Associated British-Pathé in 1958—were shown as part of ABC's daytime Afternoon Film Festival, which aired weekdays from 3:00 to 5:00 pm (ET). This show premiered January 16, 1956, and ended August 2, 1957, replaced by American Bandstand, which introduced Dick Clark to network television audiences and went on to become one of daytime's most popular programs, especially with teenagers.

== Season One (1955-1956 Season) ==
All titles listed below for the series' two seasons were cited from the TV listings of The New York Times via microfilm copies of its backlogged issues, September 1955-May 1957.

1. (09/18/1955) Odd Man Out (1947)
2. (09/25/1955) Adam and Evalyn (1949)
3. (10/02/1955) The Clouded Yellow (1951)
4. (10/09/1955) Island Rescue (1951)
5. (10/16/1955) Madonna of the Seven Moons (1945)
6. (10/23/1955) The Man in Grey (1943)
7. (10/30/1955) Notorious Gentleman (1945)
8. (11/06/1955) Caesar and Cleopatra (part one) (1945)
9. (11/13/1955) Caesar and Cleopatra (part two) (1945)
10. (11/20/1955) The Lavender Hill Mob (1951)
11. (11/27/1955) Tight Little Island (1949)
12. (12/04/1955) The Woman in Question (1950)
13. (12/11/1955) The Promoter (1952)
14. (12/18/1955) The Blue Lagoon (1949)
15. (12/25/1955) The Red Shoes (part one) (1948)
16. (01/01/1956) The Red Shoes (part two) (1948)
17. (01/08/1956) White Corridors (1951)
18. (01/15/1956) Ivory Hunter (1951)
19. (01/22/1956) In Which We Serve (1942)
20. (01/29/1956) The Mikado (1939)
21. (02/05/1956) Stairway to Heaven (1946)
22. (02/12/1956) The Importance of Being Earnest (1952)

The remainder of this first season consisted of reruns of the films above, some of which were repeated twice before the beginning of the second season in October 1956, when the series moved to a new night: Saturdays from 7:30 to 9:00 pm (Eastern Time).

== Season Two (1956-1957 Season) ==
1. (10/06/1956) The Captive Heart (1946)
2. (10/13/1956) Genevieve (1953)
3. (10/20/1956) The Rainbow Jacket (1954)
4. (10/27/1956) The Life and Death of Colonel Blimp (part one) (1943)
5. (11/03/1956) The Life and Death of Colonel Blimp (part two) (1943)
6. (11/10/1956) Tonight at 8:30 (1952)
7. (11/17/1956) Golden Salamander (1950)
8. (11/24/1956) The Titfield Thunderbolt (1953)
9. (12/01/1956) Hamlet (part one) (1948)
10. (12/08/1956) Hamlet (part two) (1948)
11. (12/15/1956) Miranda (1948)
12. (12/22/1956) Desperate Moment (1953)
13. (12/29/1956) School for Secrets (1946)
14. (01/05/1957) Hungry Hill (1947)
15. (01/12/1957) English Without Tears (1944)
16. (01/19/1957) Forbidden Cargo (1954)
17. (01/26/1957) A Queen Is Crowned (1953)
18. (02/02/1957) Madness of the Heart (1949)
19. (02/09/1957) The Girl in the Painting (1948)
20. (02/16/1957) Don't Take It to Heart (1944)
21. (02/23/1957) Broken Journey (1948)
22. (03/02/1957) The Long Dark Hall (1951)
23. (03/09/1957) The Man in Grey (1943) (Rerun from the first season's slate)
24. (03/16/1957) Bitter Springs (1950)
25. (03/23/1957) A Place of One's Own (1945)
26. (03/30/1957) They Were Not Divided (1950)
27. (04/06/1957) The October Man (1947)
28. (04/13/1957) The Cruel Sea (1953)
29. (04/20/1957) One Woman's Story (1949)
30. (04/27/1957) The Stranger In Between (1952)
31. (05/04/1957) Frieda (1947)
32. (05/11/1957) Eureka Stockade (1949)
33. (05/18/1957) The Rocking Horse Winner (1949)
34. (05/25/1957) The Spider and the Fly (1949)

After re-running Tonight at 8:30 on June 8, ABC ceased airing its Famous Film Festival series. Instead, through the summer of 1957, the network used its 7:30-9:00 time-slot on Saturdays to broadcast televised sermons by Billy Graham and then later (beginning July 6), ABC aired Country Music Hayride.

== See also ==
- 1955-56 United States network television schedule
- 1956–57 United States network television schedule
- Afternoon Film Festival
