= Afternoon Film Festival =

- 1956 Trade Advertisement for ABC's Afternoon Film Festival.
- Genre: Film Anthology
- Presented by: Allyn Edwards (1956); Donald Woods (1956-57)
- Country of origin: United States
- Original language: English

Production
- Production location: ABC (American Broadcasting Company) studios (New York City)
- Running time: 2 hours (1956); 90 minutes (1956-57)

Original release
- Network: ABC
- Release: January 16, 1956 – August 2, 1957

Afternoon Film Festival was a series of British theatrical feature-films aired by the American Broadcasting Company (ABC) television network from January 1956 through the summer of 1957 each weekday from 3:00 to 5:00 pm (EST). This anthology was the first (and probably the only) instance of a major over-the-air (non-cable) American television network broadcasting a package of theatrical movies as part of its Monday-through-Friday daytime television programming. Consisting mostly of films from the 1940s and early 1950s, Afternoon Film Festival was actually an offshoot from ABC's prime-time movie series Famous Film Festival, which began in the fall of 1955 on Sunday evenings and featured a package of 35 British titles leased from J. Arthur Rank Film Distributors in England at a cost of $45,700 each.

ABC signed Allyn Edwards—and later, the veteran actor Donald Woods—to host each Afternoon feature, and on Monday, January 16, 1956, the anthology premiered with Alfred Hitchcock's espionage thriller The Lady Vanishes (1938). The next afternoon, the internationally successful war drama The Cruel Sea (1953) was telecast. The Lady Vanishes had originally premiered in 1944 on WNBT in New York, but for almost all the rest this would be the first time these films were ever aired on American television.

== Troubling aspects ==
Unfortunately, the series suffered from several handicaps that were never overcome. One of ABC's competitors, for example, the National Broadcasting Company (NBC), was featuring its Matinee Theater in the same daily time slot as Festival. This was a timely and interesting series of live one-hour television dramas, often highlighting controversial domestic themes, geared to divert housewives from their daily chores. Matinee Theater had one other advantage—NBC was broadcasting it in color (a relative novelty at the time), whereas ABC's series of old films were all aired in black-and-white, including those that had originally been shot and exhibited theatrically in color. (In fact, NBC's 1956 presentation of Olivier's Richard III notwithstanding, color films were not broadcast in color on network TV until the 1961-62 season.)

However, a second disadvantage centered on the Afternoon Film Festival's increased reliance on the limited number of films from the Rank package. This inevitably led to the re-running of films that had debuted just a week or so earlier. Thus, the aforementioned The Cruel Sea, which first ran on January 17, 1956, was broadcast again ten days later. Additionally, the films A Run for Your Money (1949) and Always a Bride (1953), which debuted during the first week's telecasts, were both rerun only two weeks later.

But finally, it was the quality of the product itself that appeared problematic. Although the Afternoon Film Festival did provide an outlet for such prestigious British films as The October Man (1947) and The Way Ahead (1944), a majority of the films held low-to-moderate critical and popular appeal. These lesser works were represented by entries such as those of The Huggetts series (1947-1949), as well as Stop Press Girl (1949), It's Not Cricket (1949), and Third Time Lucky (1949). Indeed, at a meeting of the TV Editorial Advisory Board in the spring of 1956, a questionnaire was distributed to members asking them to respond to ABC's film series and to the notion of networks exhibiting more theatrical films on television in the future. Some of their reactions were less than enthusiastic. In fact, a sizable plurality of respondents expressed concern that "these shows might provide a dumping ground for Grade B, C, and D pictures...Television should be more than a fifth-rate movie house."

In September 1956, the Afternoon Film Festival's time-slot was reduced from two hours to 90 minutes; and at mid-season, there followed an announcement from ABC that the series would be cancelled some time in the near-future. The paring down of broadcast time to 90 minutes, of course, necessitated heavier editing of films to allow for commercials. The anthology finally came to an end the afternoon of Friday, August 2, 1957, with a repeat telecast of the race-car comedy Genevieve (1953). The following Monday, the Afternoon Film Festival was replaced by the premiere of Dick Clark's American Bandstand.

== First broadcasts, week by week (1956) ==
The following list was cited from back issues of The New York Times, archived on microfilm.

Aqua indicates the premiere of a film.
White indicates a rebroadcast.

1956	Monday	Tuesday	Wednesday	Thursday	Friday
01/16 - 01/20:	The Lady Vanishes (1938)	The Cruel Sea (1953)	A Run for Your Money (1949)	Always a Bride (1953)	Curtain Up (1952)
01/23 - 01/27:	The Stranger in Between (1952)	Traveller's Joy (1949)	Marry Me! (1949)	The Spider and the Fly (1949)	The Cruel Sea (1953)
01/30 - 02/03:	The Adventurers (1951)	One Woman's Story (1949)	The Inheritance (1947)	A Run for Your Money (1949)	Always a Bride (1953)
02/06 - 02/10:	The Rocking Horse Winner (1949)	Beware of Pity (1946)	Traveller's Joy (1949)	Operation Disaster (1950)	The Stranger in Between (1952)
02/13 - 02/17:	Frieda (1947)	Curtain Up (1952)	The Spider and the Fly (1949)	The Cruel Sea (1953)	The Inheritance (1947)
02/20 - 02/24:	Operation Disaster (1950)	Floodtide (1949)	One Woman's Story (1949)	Traveller's Joy (1949)	The Rocking Horse Winner (1949)

Thus, in the first six weeks of the Afternoon Film Festival's run, 13 out of 30 broadcasts, or almost half, were reruns. During the next few weeks, four out of every five showings were repeat telecasts. This troubling trend continued until late March, when a spate of fresh titles was finally secured:

1956	Monday	Tuesday	Wednesday	Thursday	Friday
03/26 - 03/30:	Boys in Brown (1949)	One Night with You (1948)	Caravan (1946)	Another Shore (1948)	Take My Life (1947)
04/02 - 04/06:	Turn the Key Softly (1953)	Here Come the Huggetts (1948)	Dance Hall (1950)	Don't Take It to Heart (1944)	Third Time Lucky (1949)

But the supply of new titles dwindled and again the series had to rely heavily on re-broadcasts. On average, new titles would trickle through to the show's viewers at the pace of roughly one per week. Occasionally, an entry of exceptional note, such as Powell and Pressburger's 1945 film I Know Where I'm Going! would make its bow on the series. However, the combined lack of both quantity and quality became the rule and not the exception throughout the Festival's 19-month run.
