= Allyn Edwards =

American radio and TV announcer and host (1914 or 1915 - 1968)

Allyn Edwards (1914 or 1915 - July 9, 1968) was an American announcer and host on radio and television.

== Early years ==
Edwards was born and raised in Brooklyn. He was a student at P. S. 171 and graduated from John Adams High School. He graduated from Louisiana State University (LSU). Although he had planned to study psychology, his interests turned to music. During his time at LSU he organized a dance band that played for events at the university and in the surrounding area. Edwards later graduated from Eastman School of Music, where he studied composition, piano, and theory.

== Career ==
After graduating from Eastman, Edwards played piano and arranged music for several jazz bands that toured in the United States. When he tired of the touring band life he sought less-mobile work, emerging with two possibilities for jobs: selling typewriter ribbons and being a radio announcer. The first offer came from radio, and his career in broadcasting began at WRDW radio in Augusta, Georgia, where he was hired as an announcer (which he said "included every task there is in a radio station, from being my own engineer to servicing accounts") and later was promoted to program manager. He went on to work in radio at WIS in Columbia, South Carolina, from 1939 to 1941. There he had a 6-9 a.m. program, was music director, and provided special-event coverage. In 1941 he went to WTIC in Hartford, Connecticut.

During World War II, Edwards worked with the United States Office of War Information (OWI) and was heard on 7,000 OWI programs each week. In 1945, he joined the staff of WQXR in New York City as an announcer. He later worked at New York City radio stations WNTA and WNBC. In 1950 he worked at WNEW radio in New York City on the programs Let Yourself Go and Weekend Holiday, and in the mid-1950s, he had a morning show on NBC radio. Transcribed syndicated programs on which Edwards was heard included A Date with Music and The Avenger.

Edwards's work on television included being announcer on The Jane Froman Show, host of Afternoon Film Festival, master of ceremonies on A Couple of Joes, and host and narrator of Mr. Citizen. Other TV shows on which he worked included Holiday Hotel, Meet the Press, Paul Whiteman Show, Take a Word, TV Museum, Party Time at Arthur Murray's, and Entertainment Press Conference.

Edwards participated in little theater groups.

A review in the trade publication Sponsor called Edwards "A top quality announcer, one of the few gents who can convey conviction without nervousness", and it described his on-camera work in a commercial as "intimate without being cloying, hard-selling without being overbearing".

== Personal life and death ==
Edwards was married to Peggy Harvey, and they had four daughters. He died in his home of a heart attack on July 9, 1968, aged 53. Memorial services were held on July 12, 1968, in Friends Meeting House in New York City.
