= Lone Star Moonlight =

1946 film

- Theatrical release poster
- Directed by: Ray Nazarro
- Screenplay by: Louise Rousseau
- Story by: Louise Rousseau; Ande Lamb
- Produced by: Colbert Clark
- Starring: Ken Curtis; Joan Barton; Guy Kibbee; Robert Kellard; Claudia Drake; Arthur Loft
- Cinematography: George F. Kelley
- Edited by: Paul Borofsky
- Production company: Columbia Pictures
- Distributed by: Columbia Pictures
- Release date: December 12, 1946
- Running time: 67 minutes
- Country: United States
- Language: English

Lone Star Moonlight is a 1946 American Western film directed by Ray Nazarro and written by Louise Rousseau and Ande Lamb. The film stars Ken Curtis, Joan Barton, Guy Kibbee, Robert Kellard, Claudia Drake and Arthur Loft. It was released on December 12, 1946, by Columbia Pictures.

== Cast ==
- Ken Curtis as Curt Norton
- Joan Barton as Jean White
- Guy Kibbee as Amos Norton
- Robert Kellard as Eddie Jackson
- Claudia Drake as Mimi Carston
- Arthur Loft as Thaddeus White
- Vernon Dent as Sheriff
- Sam Flint as Jim Mahoney
- Ken Trietsch as Hoosier Hotshot Ken
- Paul Trietsch as Hoosier Hotshot Hezzie
- Gil Taylor as Hoosier Hotshot Gil
- Charles Ward as Hoosier Hotshot Gabe
- Merle Travis as Merle Travis
- Judy Clark as Judy Clark
