= Air Time '57 =

Television series

- Written by: Harvey Orkin
- Directed by: Hal Davis
- Country of origin: United States
- No. of seasons: 1
- No. of episodes: 15

Production
- Producer: Allan Stanley
- Running time: 30 minutes

Original release
- Network: American Broadcasting Company
- Release: December 27, 1956 – April 4, 1957

Air Time ’57 (or simply Air Time) is a live musical variety series that aired briefly on ABC television. It was hosted by singer and radio star Vaughn Monroe. Scheduled opposite shows that were more solidly established, the program lasted little more than three months.

== Background ==
Monroe had previously hosted two other network television shows: the one-season half-hour The Vaughn Monroe Show on CBS in 1950 (also known as Camel Caravan and based on the radio show of the same name) and two runs on NBC of the 15-minute The Vaughn Monroe Show during the summers of 1954 and 1955, as Tuesday/Thursday replacements for The Dinah Shore Show. Air Time was an attempt to continue to capitalize on Monroe's successful singing career.

Allen Stanley was the producer, and Hal Davis was the director. The show was presented by the U.S. Air Force Reserve.

== Cast ==
Jazz trumpeter Bobby Hackett and the Elliot Lawrence Orchestra were regulars on the show. One or more guest stars also appeared each week.

Dorothy Collins guested on the first show.

== Broadcast history ==
Air Time was broadcast at 10:00 pm on Thursdays opposite Playhouse 90 on CBS and Lux Video Theatre on NBC.
