= Angel and the Badman =

1947 American Western film by James Edward Grant

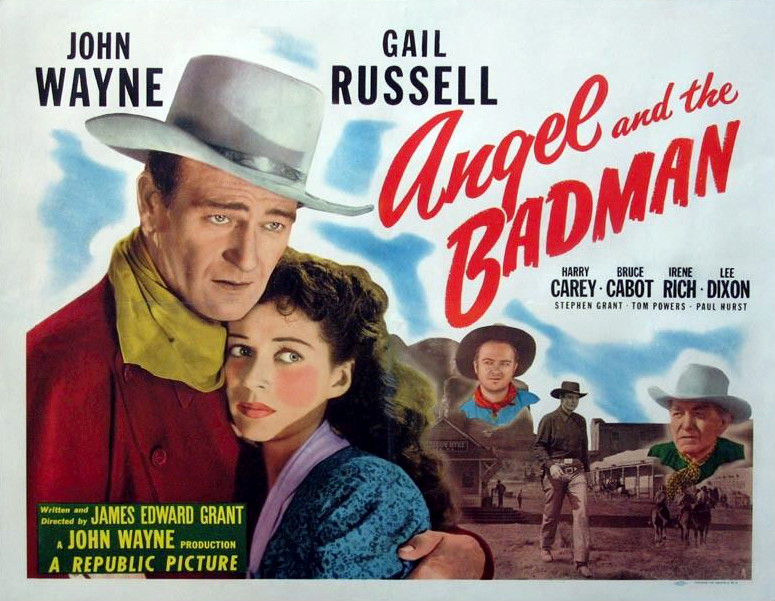
- Theatrical release poster
- Directed by: James Edward Grant
- Written by: James Edward Grant
- Produced by: John Wayne
- Starring: John Wayne; Gail Russell; Harry Carey; Bruce Cabot; Irene Rich; Lee Dixon; Stephen Grant; Tom Powers; Paul Hurst
- Cinematography: Archie J. Stout
- Edited by: Harry Keller
- Music by: Richard Hageman
- Production companies: John Wayne Productions Patnal Productions
- Distributed by: Republic Pictures
- Release date: February 15, 1947 (United States)
- Running time: 100 minutes
- Country: United States
- Language: English
- Budget: $1,313,397
- Box office: $1,794,604 (as at March 27, 1953)

Angel and the Badman is a 1947 American Western film written and directed by James Edward Grant and starring John Wayne, Gail Russell, Harry Carey, and Bruce Cabot. The film is about an injured gunfighter, who is nursed back to health by a young Quaker woman and her family, whose way of life influences him and his violent ways. Angel and the Badman was the first film Wayne produced, and the film was a departure for the genre when it was released. Writer-director James Edward Grant was Wayne's frequent screenwriting collaborator.

In 1975, the film entered the public domain in the United States because National Telefilm Associates did not renew its copyright registration 28 years after its release.

== Plot ==
Wounded Quirt Evans' horse collapses in front of Quaker Thomas Worth's homestead. Quirt says that he must go to the telegraph station. Thomas and his daughter Penelope (Penny) offer to drive him into town in their wagon, to which Quirt agrees. After wiring a claim to the land recorder's office, Quirt passes out, recalling his old friend Hopper in grade school. The telegraph operator, Bradley, tells Penny that Quirt is a famous gunman and a ladies' man. At the Worths' house, the doctor treats a delirious Quirt and warns the family that offering him shelter is dangerous. Once Quirt has regained consciousness, Penny explains the family's belief in nonviolence.

Laredo Stevens and three associates ride into town looking for Quirt. Penny's younger brother Johnny warns Quirt, who prepares to leave. Penny, now smitten with Quirt, offers to run off with him. Quirt checks his gun and discovers that it has been emptied just as Stevens's gang arrives. Training his weapon on the doorway, Quirt calmly greets Laredo and his gang. Thinking that Quirt has the upper hand, Laredo offers to buy his claim. When Quirt sets the price at $20,000, Laredo hands over $5,000 in gold and challenges him to come for the balance when he is able.

Angel and the Badman (full movie, public domain)

Afterward, Quirt prepares to leave, but when Penny begs him to stay, he changes his mind. When Quirt learns that rancher Frederick Carson dammed the stream running through the valley, draining the Worths' irrigation ditches, he intimidates Carson into opening the dam. Afterward, Quirt was surprised when Carson thanked him for forcing him to share his water, as he enjoyed the newfound respect and friendship he had with his neighbors.

Penny asks Quirt to accompany the family to a Quaker meeting. Before they leave, Marshal Wistful McClintock comes to question Quirt about a stagecoach robbery. The family swears that Quirt was with them at the time. McClintock asks Quirt why he resigned as Wyatt Earp's deputy and sold his ranch, soon after Laredo gunned down Walt Ennis in a saloon brawl. When Quirt refuses to answer, McClintock leaves. When Penny begs Quirt to steer clear of Laredo, he says he will. On the way to the meeting, they meet Quirt's friend Randy McCall. At the meeting, Randy tells Quirt that Laredo plans to rustle a herd of cattle and suggests that they then steal the herd from Laredo and let him take the blame. Thomas presents Quirt with a Bible, embossed with his name, in gratitude for his role in ending the water feud with Carson. Fearing that he will never live up to Penny's expectations, Quirt abruptly leaves with Randy.

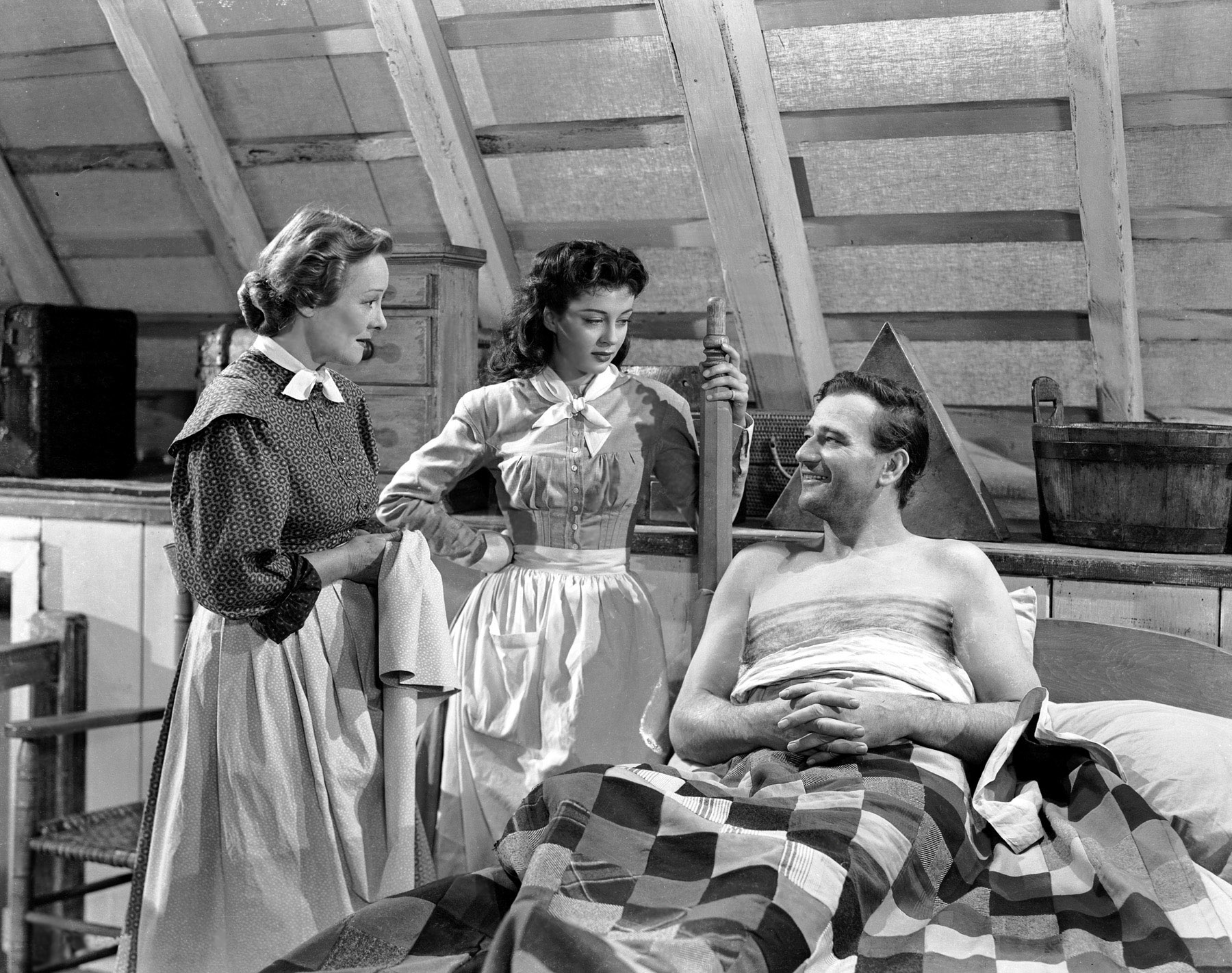
Quirt recovering under the care of the two women (from left to right: Rich, Russell, and Wayne)

Quirt and Randy steal the herd from the original rustlers. They then celebrate with showgirls Lila Neal and Christine Taylor. After a bar fight, Lila teases Quirt about his Bible, who is angered and rides back to the Worth farm. Penny is pleased, but when McClintock arrives to question Quirt about the rustling, Quirt says that Lila can provide him with an alibi. Penny is hurt because she heard Quirt talk about Lila in his delirium, and thinks that Quirt prefers Lila. Quirt kisses her to show who he really prefers.

McClintock warns Quirt that he is the wrong man for Penny, but Quirt proposes to her anyway. Instead of replying, Penny takes Quirt to pick blackberries. When Penny asks how he came by his name, he says that Walt Ennis found and raised him and that later Ennis was murdered in a saloon brawl. On their way home, they are ambushed and chased by Laredo and Hondo. Their wagon plunges over a cliff into the river. Penny develops a fever, and when the doctor tells Quirt no hope remains for her, he straps on his pistol and rides into town. After Quirt leaves, Penny's fever suddenly breaks.

In town, Quirt sends Bradley to tell Laredo and Hondo that he is waiting for them in the street. The Worths arrive and Penny convinces Quirt to surrender his gun to her. As Laredo and Hondo draw their guns, McClintock shoots them both. Quirt, swearing off his former life of violence to McClintock, rides off in the wagon with Penny to become a farmer. McClintock picks up Quirt's discarded weapon and Bradley comments that Quirt may need it, but McClintock says, "Only a man who carries a gun ever needs one."

== Cast ==
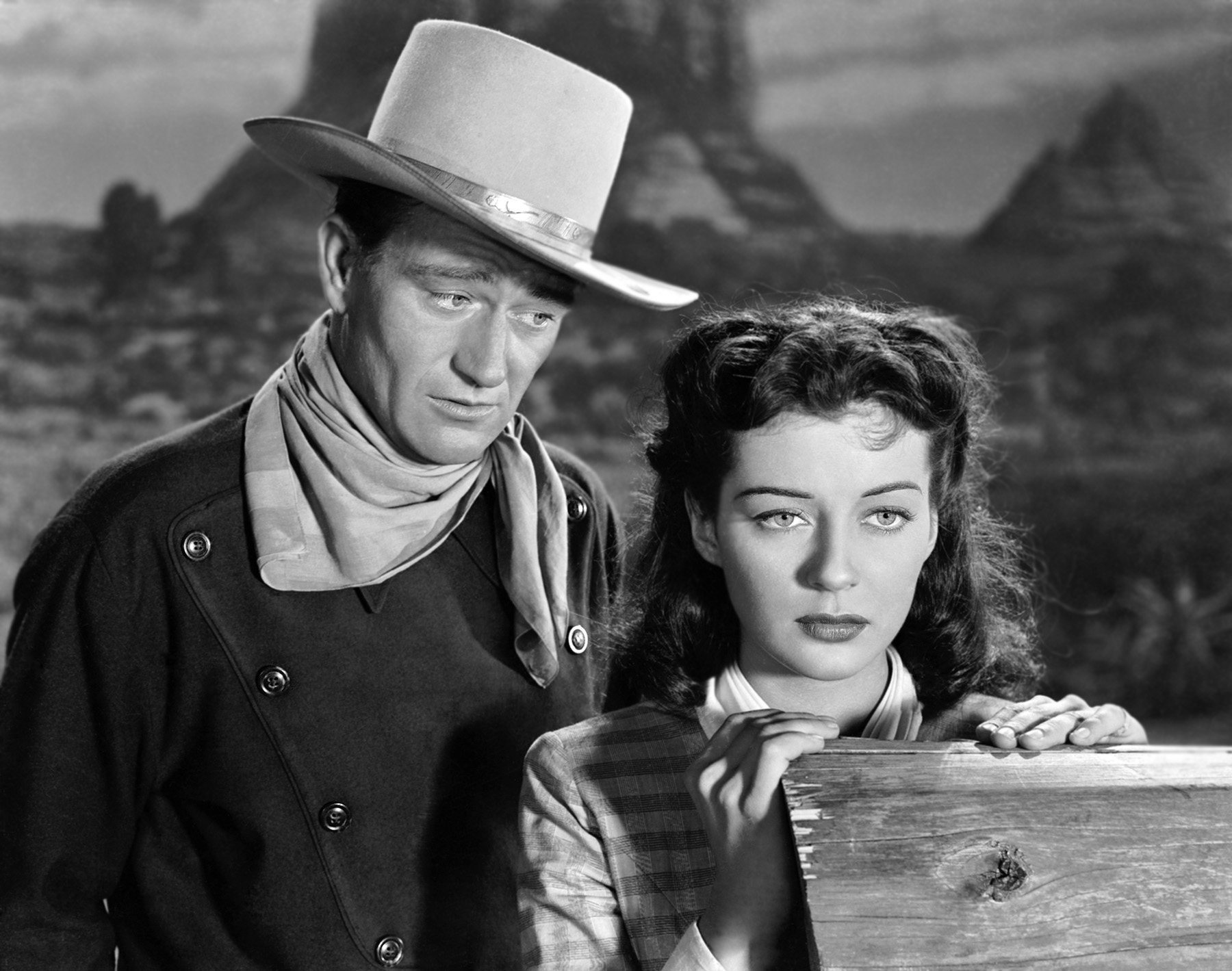
John Wayne and Gail Russell

- John Wayne as Quirt Evans
- Gail Russell as Penelope Worth
- Harry Carey as Marshal Wistful McClintock
- Bruce Cabot as Laredo Stevens
- Irene Rich as Mrs. Worth
- Lee Dixon as Randy McCall
- Stephen Grant as Johnny Worth
- Tom Powers as Dr. Mangram
- Paul Hurst as Frederick Carson
- Olin Howland as Telegraph Operator Bradley
- John Halloran as Thomas Worth
- Joan Barton as Lila Neal
- Craig Woods as Ward Withers
- Marshall Reed as Nelson
- Paul Fix as Mouse Marr (uncredited)
- Hank Worden as Townsman (uncredited)
- Louis Faust as Hondo Jeffries (uncredited)
- Symona Boniface as Dance Hall Madam (uncredited)

== Production ==
=== Filming ===
Principal photography took place from mid-April through late June 1946, in Flagstaff and Sedona, Arizona, and in Monument Valley in Utah.

=== Soundtrack ===
- "A Little Bit Different" (Kim Gannon and Walter Kent) by Joan Barton
- "Darling Nelly Gray" (Benjamin Russell Hamby) by Joan Barton and Lee Dixon

=== Production credits ===
- Director – James Edward Grant
- Producer – John Wayne
- Writer – James Edward Grant
- Music – Richard Hageman (musical score)
- Cinematography – Archie Stout (photography)
- Art direction – Ernst Fegté (production design), John McCarthy Jr., and Charles S. Thompson (set decorations)
- Second unit director – Yakima Canutt
- Editor – Harry Keller
- Musical director – Cy Feuer
- Sound – Vic Appel
- Costume design – Adele Palmer
- Special effects – Howard and Theodore Lydecker
- Makeup supervision – Bob Mark
- Hair stylist – Peggy Gray

== Song ==
In 1993, Johnny Cash wrote and sang a song inspired by this film called "Angel and the Badman".

== Reception ==
Upon the film's release, a The New York Times reviewer wrote, "Mr. Wayne and company have sacrificed the usual roaring action to fashion a leisurely Western, which is different from and a notch or two superior to the normal sagebrush saga." The reviewer continues:

James Edward Grant, who wrote and directed the story, has included the gun fights, slugging melées, and scenic pursuits necessary to fill out the yarn. But, mainly, he has portrayed the change in Quirt Evans, a feared triggerman of the frontier southwest, who when wounded, is not only nursed to health, but [also] subtly won over by Penelope Worth and her Quaker philosophy.

The reviewer concludes, "John Wayne makes a grim and laconic, converted renegade, who is torn by love, a new faith, and the desire for revenge on an arch enemy. Gail Russell, a stranger to Westerns, is convincing as the lady who makes him see the light."

== Remakes ==
The film was remade in 2009 for the Hallmark Channel by Terry Ingram, with Lou Diamond Phillips playing Quirt Evans and Wayne's grandson Brendan in a cameo appearance. The remake also stars Deborah Kara Unger as Temperance, Luke Perry as Laredo, and Terence Kelly as Thomas.

Another remake, starring Zachary Levi, Neal McDonough, and Tommy Lee Jones, was released on October 9, 2026. It was distributed by Angel Studios. The version received negative reviews from critics. To date this film has grossed $3.6 million at the box office.

Angel and the Badman also inspired two other successful "fish out of water" films: Witness (1985) starring Harrison Ford, and The Outsider (2003), starring Tim Daly and Naomi Watts.

== See also ==
- John Wayne filmography
- List of American films of 1947
