= Mary Lou (1948 film) =

1948 film by Arthur Dreifuss

- Directed by: Arthur Dreifuss
- Written by: M. Coates Webster
- Produced by: Sam Katzman
- Starring: Robert Lowery; Joan Barton; Glenda Farrell
- Cinematography: Ira H. Morgan
- Edited by: Viola Lawrence
- Music by: Joseph Dubin
- Production company: Sam Katzman Productions
- Distributed by: Columbia Pictures
- Release date: January 23, 1948
- Running time: 65 minutes
- Country: United States
- Language: English

Mary Lou is a 1948 American musical film starring Robert Lowery, Joan Barton and Glenda Farrell. The film featured Lynn Sousa, granddaughter of John Philip Sousa.

== Cast ==
- Robert Lowery as Steve Roberts
- Joan Barton as Ann Parker
- Glenda Farrell as Winnie Winford
- Abigail Adams as Mary Lou
- Frank Jenks as Mike Connors
- Emmett Vogan as Murry Harris
- Thelma White as Eve Summers
- Pierre Watkin as Airline president

== Production ==
The film was announced in June 1947.
