= Mr. Citizen (TV series) =

American anthology TV series (1955)

Mr. Citizen is a 30-minute American anthology series of dramas based on actual acts of heroism performed by average people. It was produced by Ed Byron and hosted by Allyn Edwards. Among its guest stars were Hal Holbrook, Paul Lukas, James Daly and Anne Seymour. Thirteen episodes aired on ABC from April 10, 1955 to July 13, 1955. Each episode included a prominent American's presentation of the Mister Citizen Award to the person featured.

== Format ==
Episodes began with a dramatization of something that an ordinary citizen did that was heroic in nature. When that segment concluded, a camera was turned to the studio audience, revealing the person who had performed the heroic action. He or she was brought on stage and interviewed, after which the award was presented.

== Episodes ==
- April 20, 1955 - "Late for Supper", starring Holbrook and Nancy Kenyon.
- May 18, 1955 - "A Present for Mary", starring William Gargan.
- June 9, 1955 - "The Friendly Stranger", starring Lukas.

== Production ==
Sponsored by Liggett & Myers, Mr. Citizen replaced that company's Stuart Erwin program. Ed Byron was the producer, and Charles Tate was the director. Howard Rodman and Robert Shaw were the writers, and John Gart led the orchestra.

Mr. Citizen was broadcast live on Wednesdays from 8:30 to 9 p.m. Eastern Time.

== Critical response ==
Gene Plotnik, writing in the trade publication Billboard, noted that Mr. Citizen contained elements "that have already proved successful in other programs", such as The Big Story and This Is Your Life. He cited some flaws in the premiere episode but suggested that the series "will probably do a pretty good selling job" for its sponsor.
