= A Couple of Joes =

American television variety program

- Genre: Variety
- Directed by: Bobby Doyle
- Presented by: Joe Bushkin and Joe Rosenfield

Production
- Producers: Ed Kenner and Allen Kent

Original release
- Network: ABC
- Release: August 1949 – July 12, 1950

A Couple of Joes is an American television variety program that was broadcast locally in New York City beginning in August 1949. It ran on ABC from October 27, 1949, until July 12, 1950. The program featured comedy, music, and participation by viewers.

== Content ==
Episodes of A Couple of Joes included singing, instrumental music, and segments with prizes for viewer participation. The latter included bringing in items like a mustache cup and high-button shoes; viewers calling in musical requests, hoping to stump the two Joes by naming tunes that they could not play; and hosts calling viewers with quiz questions.

== Personnel ==
Initially, Joe Bushkin and Joe Rosenfield were co-hosts of the program. Others featured included Joan Barton, Allyn Edwards, Beryl Richards, and Pat Harrington. Music was provided by Milton DeLugg's orchestra in 1949 and Mike Reilly's orchestra and Bobby Sherwood's orchestra in 1950. By the first episode of 1950, Warren Hull had replaced Rosenfield on the show.

The show also included Morgan, a basset hound who belonged to the producer. Life magazine featured the dog in a story and photographs in its March 27, 1950, issue, reporting that Morgan was a "3-year-old pedigreed basset hound called J. J. Morgan, though his real name is Sir Guy Elwell". On A Couple of Joes, a voice supposed to be that of Morgan made jokes while people talked and bands played. The article in Life described those comments as "a blend of critical disdain worthy of George Jean Nathan and Queen Victoria". The dog also appeared on other TV programs.

== Production ==
The program originated at WJZ-TV in New York City and was produced by World Video, Incorporated. Producers were Ed Kenner and Allen Kent, and Bobby Doyle was the director. Sponsors included Blatz Brewing Company. Tom Shirley was the announcer.

== Critical reception ==
A review of the program's August 19, 1949, episode in the trade publication Billboard compared the broadcast to "a chaotic dress rehearsal". Reviewer June Bundy commented, "Musical portions of the show were vastly superior to the giveaway portions", describing the latter as "all very confusing". She complimented Bushkin for his performances on the piano and his work as master of ceremonies. In contrast, she wrote that Rosenfield's "harassed expression, nervous mannerisms and heavy-handed attempts at comedy were embarrassing to both cast and viewer".
