= The Walter Winchell Show (variety) =

American TV variety show (1956)

The Walter Winchell Show is an American variety television program that was broadcast on NBC from October 5, 1956, to December 28, 1956.

== Overview ==
Columnist Walter Winchell hosted this variety show, which attracted guest performers including those "who owed him favors". It was his first venture into a variety program after having previous broadcasting experience in news programs. In addition to individual performances, the Bil and Cora Baird Marionettes appeared on the October 12, 1956, episode, and the November 23, 1956, episode featured the cast of the Broadway musical Li'l Abner presenting highlights from the show the week after it opened. In addition to people who performed in episodes, "a plush sort of corral for VIPs" included other celebrities — Winchell's counterpart to the way hosts of other programs introduced stars in the audience. The VIP group in the premiere episode consisted of Harry Cohn, Joe DiMaggio, Dorothy Kilgallen, Lee Meriwether, and George Raft.

== Guest stars ==
Guest performers who appeared on the program included:

- Edie Adams
- Don Cherry
- Perry Como
- Jill Corey
- Sammy Davis Jr.
- Jimmy Durante
- Eddie Fisher
- Stubby Kaye
- Lisa Kirk
- Jim Lowe
- Beatrice Lillie
- Frankie Lymon and the Teenagers
- Dick Martin
- Martha Raye
- Dan Rowan
- Barry Sullivan

== Production ==
Broadcast in color from the Colonial Theatre in New York City, the show was presented live on Fridays from 8:30 to 9 p.m. Eastern Time. It initially originated from New York, then moved to Hollywood. The weekly budget was $40,000 for talent and production, including Winchell's fee. Alan Handley produced and directed the program. The writers were Ray Allen, Retlaw Chellwin, Harvey Bullock, and Milt Rosen. The Toni Company and P. Lorillard (for Old Gold cigarettes) were alternate sponsors.

Viewers with black-and-white sets in cities where TV stations did not have direct access to the network encountered technical problems resulting from the use of kinescope recordings. George Tashman, a columnist for The (Richmond, California) Independent, wrote, "the kinescope quality was among the worst I've ever seen" and added that he would have turned the show off had it not been the debut episode. He added that Dinah Shore's program the same night had similar problems with the "'compatible' black-and-white" technology.

By mid-November 1956 the show's ratings were "lagging badly". By January 1957 it was gone.

== Critical response ==
A review in the trade publication Broadcasting noted how much Winchell emphasized himself in the premiere episode: "There simply wasn't a moment during the entire 30 minutes that he let us forget that it was his and his show only." It also explained how appearing on the show was "career insurance" for celebrities: "After all, you can never know tonight what tomorrow's Winchell column will say about you."

A review of the second episode in the trade publication Variety pointed out the number of acts on the show and said that they "made a lot of viewing to crowd into a half-hour, but it went over entertainingly".

Jack O'Brian, in a newspaper column distributed by International News Service, described the premiere episode as "thoroughly conventional", which he said was not good enough for a host of Winchell's status. O'Brian explained that Winchell's intensity as he introduced acts exceeded that of the acts themselves. He pointed out "a simple rule" that Winchell needed to learn: "[Y]ou can't make something what it is not simply by consciously constructing a high-keyed mood of words and enthusiasm." The episode would have been better, he added, "if his vocal and emotional level had been several decibels below a shout, for such forceful drive and fire must be matched in the subsequent size, shape, and impact of the other elements of the show."
