= Dollar a Second =

- Presented by: Jan Murray
- Country of origin: United States

Production
- Running time: 25 mins.
- Production company: Trinity Productions

Original release
- Network: DuMont (1953-1954); NBC (1954, 1955, 1957); ABC (1954-1955, 1955-1956)
- Release: September 20, 1953 – September 28, 1957

Dollar a Second is an American comedy game show hosted by Jan Murray which originally aired from September 20, 1953, to June 14, 1954, on the DuMont Television Network. After its DuMont run several later versions aired, alternating between NBC and ABC runs. It was based on the French radio program Cent Francs par seconde (which had been made into a romantic comedy of the same name at the time of the American debut).

== Game play ==
Contestants (team or solo player) had to perform various tasks, winning $1 (compared to 100F [roughly €4 in 2025] on the original show) for every second they were onstage, and, unless they were paying the penalty, could quit out at any time. If a mistake was made, they had to pay a penalty. For example, a loved one was placed on a slide that went down towards a small above-ground swimming pool, and the contestant had to pick one of five telephone numbers from a rack of envelopes, one of which nobody on the other side would be available to answer. Should someone be there on the other end of the line, the contestant who dialed the number would say "I've got somebody!" and the penalty was beaten, and they would then resume the previous activity before they were interrupted. If they failed to beat the penalty, the game ended, but they kept any money won at that point, and sometimes also won additional money based on the number of correct answers.

However, while all this was happening, there was something else in the background that could also affect the final outcome of the game. The "outside event" was something that when it occurred, the game ended and all money made while playing was lost. For example, contestants had to pick an envelope that contained the number of round trips a model train could take until it reached a certain number, but wouldn't know how many trips that train would make until that mystery number had been attained. In such a case, contestants would still receive a consolation prize based on the number of correct answers put together.

== Broadcast history ==
After the series left DuMont, it bounced back and forth between NBC and ABC—July 4 to August 22, 1954 (NBC); October 1, 1954 to June 24, 1955 (ABC); July 5 to August 30, 1955 (NBC); June 2, 1955 to August 31, 1956 (ABC).

In 1954 it replaced My Favorite Husband.

After this, Dollar a Second remained dormant until NBC picked it up one last time from June 22 to September 28, 1957. It is notable that while NBC only used it to be run during the Summer, ABC (being relatively new as a network) aired it during the regular season.

== 1981 pilot ==
A revival pilot was taped on February 7, 1981, by Chuck Barris Productions and hosted by Bob Eubanks. Despite negative opinions by some fans who saw it, this version actually had very few changes aside from starting the players off with $100, and a $500 bonus once the player reached $500.

Chuck Barris had acquired the rights to both this show and another Jan Murray series, Treasure Hunt. “Second” was produced by veteran producer Willie Stein and Barris producer David M. Greenfield, who had worked with Eubanks on The Newlywed Game. Had Dollar a Second been sold, it would have most likely been partnered with the revamped Hunt in five-a-week syndication.

== Episode status ==
For decades, only two episodes were known to exist of the original series; one is notable for being guest-hosted by Dagmar. A third episode was discovered and uploaded to YouTube in May 2021.

The 1981 pilot was aired on GSN twice - first as part of their Game Show Turkeys marathon of unsold pilots on Thanksgiving 1998, and again as part of their "Raise The Dead" unsold pilot marathon on October 28, 2000 (the latter being hosted by Elvira, Mistress of the Dark).

== International versions ==
Italy is the one country that launched a local format of the show.

Country	Name	Presenter	Channel	Broadcast
Italy	Duecento al secondo	Mario Riva	Programma Nazionale	June 19, 1955 – September 18, 1955
Italy	Un milione al secondo	Pippo Baudo	Rete 4	March 9, 1983 – June 26, 1984

== See also ==
- List of programs broadcast by the DuMont Television Network
- List of surviving DuMont Television Network broadcasts

== Bibliography ==
- David Weinstein, The Forgotten Network: DuMont and the Birth of American Television (Philadelphia: Temple University Press, 2004) ISBN 1-59213-245-6
- Alex McNeil, Total Television, Fourth edition (New York: Penguin Books, 1980) ISBN 0-14-024916-8
- Tim Brooks and Earle Marsh, The Complete Directory to Prime Time Network and Cable TV Shows 1946–Present, Ninth edition (New York: Ballantine Books, 2007) ISBN 978-0-345-49773-4
