= 1956–57 United States network television schedule (late night) =

These are the late-night Monday–Friday schedules on the three networks for each calendar season, beginning September 1956. All times are Eastern and Pacific.

Talk shows are highlighted in yellow, local programming is white.

== Schedule ==
		11:00 PM	11:30 PM	12:00 AM	12:30 AM	1:00 AM	1:30 AM	2:00 AM	2:30 AM	3:00 AM	3:30 AM	4:00 AM	4:30 PM	5:00 AM	5:30 AM
ABC		local programming or sign-off
CBS		local programming or sign-off
NBC	Fall	11:15 PM: Tonight Starring Steve Allen*				local programming or sign-off
NBC	Winter	11:15 PM: Tonight! America After Dark			local programming or sign-off
NBC	Spring	11:15 PM: Tonight! America After Dark				local programming or sign-off
NBC	Summer	11:15 PM: The Tonight Show Starring Jack Paar				local programming or sign-off

- Beginning in October, due to Steve Allen's commitment on his Sunday night NBC variety show, Ernie Kovacs became the host of The Tonight Show on Mondays and Tuesdays.

== Sources ==
- Brooks & Marsh, The Complete Directory To Prime-Time Network TV Shows (3rd ed.), Ballantine, 1984
- Castleman & Podrazik, The TV Schedule Book, McGraw-Hill Paperbacks, 1984
- TV schedules, The New York Times, September 1956–September 1957 (microfilm)
