= The Joseph Cotten Show (TV series) =

American TV courtroom drama anthology series (1956–1959)

- Also known as: On Trial; The Joseph Cotten Show—On Trial
- Genre: Legal drama
- Written by: Don Mankiewicz; Lawrence B. Marcus
- Directed by: Don Weis; Herschel Daugherty; Ida Lupino; Nicholas Ray
- Presented by: Joseph Cotten
- Country of origin: United States
- Original language: English
- No. of seasons: 2
- No. of episodes: 41

Production
- Running time: 22–26 minutes
- Production company: Fordyce Enterprises

Original release
- Network: NBC, CBS
- Release: September 14, 1956 – September 21, 1959

The Joseph Cotten Show is an American courtroom-drama anthology series that was broadcast on NBC beginning on September 14, 1956, and was rebroadcast on CBS, ending on September 21, 1959.

== Overview ==
The Joseph Cotten Show depicted real-life legal cases that had occurred in "various parts of the world and various periods of history". Joseph Cotten was the host and narrator, and he starred in about one-third of the episodes, which were "taken from court records ... slightly dramatized when necessary". The program was developed from a pilot that was broadcast on The Campbell Playhouse.

Legal authenticity of the series's content was verified by a technical advisor who was a member of the New York State Bar Association. Cotten said that the staff avoided getting too technical about legal aspects in scripts, otherwise "we'll just have lawyers in each town looking in." Many of the trials were about murder cases, but some episodes had more human-interest aspects.

== Name changes ==
The program debuted as On Trial. Cotten was so closely associated with it that, effective February 1, 1957, the name was changed to The Joseph Cotten Show—On Trial. Another change occurred in the summer of 1958 when reruns were broadcast on NBC as The Joseph Cotten Show. In 1959, CBS used The Joseph Cotten Show for a set of reruns from this program, General Electric Theater, and Schlitz Playhouse.

== Episodes ==
Partial List of Episodes of The Joseph Cotten Show
Episode	Star(s)
"Case of Sudden Death"	Dick Foran
"Colonel Blood"	Michael Wilding, Henry Daniell
"Death in the Snow"	Hoagy Carmichael
"Dog versus Biddeford"	Cotten, Jan Cheney, L. Q. Jones
"Eleanor"	Charles Laughton
"False Alarm"	Jack Carson, Janice Rule, Joseph Wiseman
"The Fourth Witness"	Dane Clark, Mala Powers
"The Gentle Voice of Murder"	Barbara Bel Geddes
"Last Edition"	Eddie Albert, Tom Helmore
"Libel in the Wax Museum"	John Baragrey, June Lockhart
"The Secret of Polanto"	Cotten, Lita Milan
"Silent Ambush"	Alan Ladd
"The Town That Slept With the Lights On"	Edmond O'Brien, Robert Middleton, Sheppard Strudwick
"The Trial of Mary Surratt"	Virginia Gregg
"Twice in Peril"	Cotten, Joseph Wiseman

== Production ==
Cotten, Collier Young, and Larry Marcus formed Fordyce Enterprises to produce the series. Directors included Ida Lupino and Nicholas Ray. Writers included Don Mankiewicz, whose enthusiasm for that job diminished when his hope to explore "important points of law" was dashed by NBC executives' insistence that episodes focus on murders. Each episode was usually filmed in three days.

The program initially was broadcast on Fridays from 9 to 9:30 p.m. Eastern Time. In June 1958, it was moved to Saturdays from 10 to 10:30 p.m. E.T. Beginning on July 6, 1959, the CBS version was on Mondays from 9:30 to 10 p.m. E.T. (replacing The Ann Sothern Show).

Alternate sponsors on NBC were Campbell Soup Company and Lever Brothers. General Foods Corporation products Post cereals and Instant Maxwell House Coffee alternated as sponsors on CBS.

== Critical response ==
A review of the premiere episode in the trade publication Variety said that the quality of the acting exceeded that of the script, which "left many weaknesses in the storyline". The review complimented the way Robert Stevenson's directing added suspense to Marcus's script. It singled out Cotten as the "uneasy misfit" in the cast, as demonstrated by his "liberal posturing".
