= The Herb Shriner Show =

The Herb Shriner Show is the title of two different American television series shown on prime time by CBS during the late 1940s and 1950s. A similar program, also hosted by Herb Shriner, was Herb Shriner Time, which was aired by ABC as part of its 1951–52 lineup.

The first Herb Shriner Show was essentially a continuation of what Shriner had previously done on radio. It was aired by CBS five nights a week (Monday, Tuesday, Thursday, Friday, and Saturday) from 7:55 to 8:00 P.M. Eastern time and consisted solely of Shriner's folksy monologues, which had already earned him comparisons to Will Rogers. This program was seen only from November 1949 until February 1950.

Herb Shriner Time was a half-hour format aired by ABC on Thursday nights at 9 PM Eastern from October 1951 to April 1952. In addition to the comedy monologues, this format provided time for guest stars, and also allowed for Shriner to play his harmonica and act in comedy sketches.

In the fall of 1952, he became emcee of Two For The Money, Goodson-Todman's answer to Groucho Marx's You Bet Your Life, in which Herb delivered a brief monologue (and occasionally performed a harmonica solo) at the start of the show, then informally interviewed his contestants before a question and answer quiz segment. As a result of the show, Herb's popularity soared during this period, and when Two For the Money ended in the summer of 1956, Herb signed with CBS for another attempt at a variety series.

The final (aka "The [New] Herb Shriner Show" [N.B., "New" was announced, but not written in the title]) was a predecessor of the current "late night" monologue + guest TV shows. It was sponsored by Pharmaceuticals, Inc., the makers of Geritol, and, as Shriner said on the air during episode #2 (? possibly contributing to the show's early demise ? [see below]): "...you know, I've been taking Geritol myself, folks, and I'll tell you one thing: It does put iron in your blood. In fact, I got my blood so full of iron now, I cut myself -- I didn't bleed, I just rusted". Like its previous format on ABC, it had a half-hour time slot, and was aired by CBS on Tuesdays at 9 PM Eastern from October to December 1956. As can be deduced from its short run, it was a near-complete failure in the Nielsen ratings, even though it boasted such guest talent as Jackie Gleason in its first episode, Orson Welles in its second and Burl Ives in its third. The sponsor, itself dissatisfied with the program's ratings, replaced Herb with To Tell the Truth near the end of December. Shriner was never offered the opportunity to host another regular network series; his later television career overall was considerably less successful than that which he had enjoyed in radio and Two For the Money. However, his sons Wil Shriner and Kin Shriner both had considerably more success on television in the 1980s, Wil as a comic and talk show host, Kin as a soap opera actor noted primarily for portraying Scotty Baldwin on ABC's long-running General Hospital.
