= Pick the Winner =

Pick the Winner is a half-hour American political television series about the 1952 and 1956 election contests for President of the United States between Dwight D. Eisenhower and Adlai Stevenson. Both versions of the show were moderated by Walter Cronkite.

== 1952 version ==
The 1952 edition was aired from August 14 weekly until the presidential election on both CBS Television and the DuMont Television Network, and was sponsored on both networks by Westinghouse Electric. The show aired Thursday nights at 9 pm Eastern Time except for the special final pre-election edition which was aired on the Monday night before the election on Tuesday.

Various spokesmen for both the Democratic and Republican parties were on hand to explain the positions, and claimed relative merits of, their respective groups. On the night before the election, various correspondents gave their best guesses as to the winner of the presidency and various other major races on a special late edition broadcast from 10:45 to 11 PM Eastern.

== 1956 version ==
The 1956 edition of the program was very similar to the one outlined above, except that by this time the DuMont network was out of business, so the program was shown solely on CBS. The 1956 version aired from 7:30 to 8 pm ET on Wednesday nights.

Guests on the show included Thomas K. Finletter, a former secretary of the Air Force who talked about tests of hydrogen bombs and ending the draft. It was broadcast on CBS Radio as well as on TV.

The final edition of Pick the Winner was broadcast on October 31, 1956. This format was not renewed by CBS for coverage of subsequent presidential elections, although the network continued to provide extensive prime-time coverage of later races.

== See also ==
- List of programs broadcast by the DuMont Television Network
- List of surviving DuMont Television Network broadcasts

== Bibliography ==
- David Weinstein, The Forgotten Network: DuMont and the Birth of American Television (Philadelphia: Temple University Press, 2004) ISBN 1-59213-245-6
- Alex McNeil, Total Television, Fourth edition (New York: Penguin Books, 1980) ISBN 0-14-024916-8
- Tim Brooks and Earle Marsh, The Complete Directory to Prime Time Network TV Shows, Third edition (New York: Ballantine Books, 1964) ISBN 0-345-31864-1
