= The Dinah Shore Show =

American TV variety series (1951–1957)

- Genre: Variety
- Written by: Charles Isaacs
- Presented by: Dinah Shore
- Country of origin: United States
- Original language: English

Production
- Producer: Alan Handley
- Camera setup: Multi-camera
- Running time: 15 minutes (approx. 12-13 minutes excluding ads)

Original release
- Network: NBC
- Release: November 27, 1951 – July 18, 1957

The Dinah Shore Show is an American television variety show that was broadcast by NBC from November 27, 1951, to July 18, 1957, sponsored by General Motors' Chevrolet division. It aired from 7:30 to 7:45 Eastern Time on Tuesday and Thursday nights, rounding out the time slot which featured the network's regular evening newscast (John Cameron Swayze's Camel News Caravan), which, like all such programs of the era, was then only 15 minutes in length.

== Overview ==
The program, broadcast live, was hosted by namesake actress and singer Dinah Shore, who had come to prominence in her home state as a radio singer and the first Jewish cheerleader at Vanderbilt University before being "discovered" and subsequently appearing on national radio and feature films. She made a relatively easy transition to TV, as noted by the length of this program's run. The series had an annual summer replacement show, as was the case with many live musical and variety programs of the era.

During this program's final season, it was reduced to appearing on Thursday nights only, with the Tuesday night slot going to The Jonathan Winters Show. However, during this season, Shore was given an opportunity to host a full hour-long variety show on Friday nights, The Dinah Shore Chevy Show, which was to run, on varying nights and timeslots, for a total of seven seasons. The 15-minute Thursday night program was discontinued following the 1956-57 season, along with all other such series (although network evening newscasts were not expanded to the half-hour format until 1963).

== Reception ==
In 1951, media critic John Crosby commented, "The Dinah Shore Show is a triumph of simplicity", "it is the most intelligently thought out show that has yet come east from Hollywood" (at the time, Hollywood-produced shows were generally held in far lower regard than New York City-produced shows), and said "it's a very pretty show to watch".

Hal Webman, in the December 8, 1951, edition of Billboard Magazine, praised writer, producer, director Alan Handley for picking "just the right camera angles with which properly to make Dinah appear so agreeable visually", for giving the episode reviewed a "whirlwind pace" and noted he "mercifully confined the Chevrolet commercials to one extremely effective filmed bit, and thus maintained the steady drive, flow and pacing of the entertainment portions of the show".

Publisher Bob Lanigan in the March 9, 1952, edition of the Brooklyn Eagle said "time has justified the original bouquets thrown at Dinah" and commented on the "elaborate and highly individual production numbers which would do justice to any high-budget, one-hour TV variety show".
