= Press Conference (TV program) =

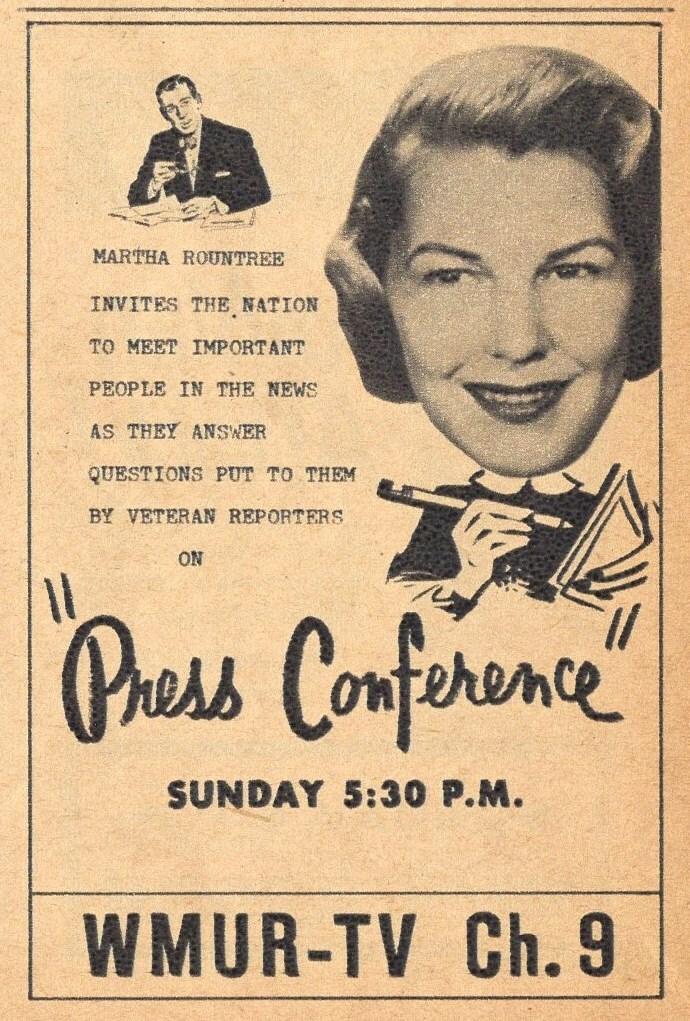
A 1957 ad featuring Martha Rountree

Press Conference was a public-affairs television program aired in the United States in the mid-1950s.

Press Conference was similar in format and content to the long-running Meet the Press and was moderated by one of that program's creators, pioneering female journalist Martha Rountree. On the program, a current newsmaker, generally but not always a politician, was questioned by a panel of newspersons in a typical press conference format. As usually done in a traditional press conference, the subject was allowed to make an opening statement (although not all chose to do so) prior to fielding questions.

Press Conference was launched on NBC in July 1956, but that fall moved to ABC. Initially shown in prime time, the program drew only a minimal, public-affairs oriented audience running against two high-profile Sunday night variety series, The Ed Sullivan Show on CBS and The Steve Allen Show on NBC; however, its appearance helped ABC to meet the public-interest requirements imposed on United States broadcasters by the Federal Communications Commission. Press Conference was moved to Sunday afternoon for three months in early 1957, prior to returning to prime time in April of that year under a new title, Martha Rountree's Press Conference. The program ended in July 1957.
