= Entertainment Productions =

American TV production company

- Formerly: Louis G. Cowan Agency (1931-1940); Louis G. Cowan & Co. (1940-1946); Louis G. Cowan, Inc. (1946-1956)
- Type: Private
- Industry: Television and radio production
- Founded: 1931; 95 years ago
- Founder: Louis G. Cowan
- Defunct: 1959
- Headquarters: New York City, New York; Chicago, Illinois
- Products: Game shows

Entertainment Productions, Inc. is a radio, television and ad agency company that was originally started in 1931 by Louis G. Cowan as an ad agency company in Chicago, before expanding into radio production in 1940 and television production in 1949. The company opened a production office in New York in 1946.

Its most notable programs were Quiz Kids, Stop the Music and The $64,000 Question, and this company, along with Barry & Enright Productions were the companies affected by the game show scandals.

== History ==
=== Early years ===
The company made its start in 1931 when university student at the University of Chicago, Louis G. Cowan was offering jobs by advertising agency companies in Chicago, but as he declined his offer, he formed his own company, Louis G. Cowan Agency. Five years later, the company opened an office in Willoughby Tower.

The company made its expansion into radio in 1940 as the company was renamed to Louis G. Cowan & Company, when Cowan conceived a concept on its own, Quiz Kids. It was a massive success. The success led Paramount Pictures to attempt to adapt Quiz Kids into a short subjects, but never materialized due to World War II.

=== Wartime years and establishment of New York office ===
In late 1941, the United States to join World War II, and shortly afterwards, Cowan was hired to join the Radio Branch of the U.S. Army on a parttime basis as a special consultant on programs and production.

During World War II, as the company took on a hiatus he headed the New York office of the United States Office of War Information. He soon exited the firm in 1945, shortly after the end of World War II. After that he returned to commercial radio, producing first Murder at Midnight and then Fighting Senator. In 1946, he formed his new company to absorb the old Cowan company, Louis G. Cowan, Inc. with offices in New York and Chicago. The company is looking to expand its property beyond the Quiz Kids IP.

Afterwards, the company partnered with Mark Goodson to conceive Stop the Music, which aired from 1948 to 1956 and became another success for the company. The company followed it with another game show Down You Go, for the DuMont Television Network, and became another smash hit for the company.

=== Biggest success, rename and fallout ===
The company made its biggest success in 1955, when CBS debuted a new Cowan series based on the radio show Take It or Leave It, who bought the rights from Milton Biow, The $64,000 Question, and was sponsored by Revlon. It was a success that turned the company around, eventually trailing I Love Lucy to became the #1 show for the 1955-1956 season. The success led Cowan to produce The Big Surprise for NBC and The $64,000 Challenge for CBS, which also turned the company around.

In 1955, in the peak of its success, Cowan moved in to CBS, and the following year, Cowan soon stepped down and the production company was renamed to Entertainment Productions, Inc. (EPI) under the presidency of Harry Fleischman. The company became a victim of the game show scandals when Dale Logue sued NBC and EPI over the outcome of the game show The Big Surprise in 1956, seeking $103,000 in damages. Its biggest setback came in 1958 when networks decided to cancel game shows following the scandals, most notably most of the EPI productions.

The company eventually went defunct in 1959 shortly after Cowan left CBS and after the outcome of the game show scandals. Producer Merrill Heatter, who worked at the company in the late 1950s, had soon started up Heatter-Quigley Productions in late 1959 to produce its first show, Video Village. Cowan, the company founder went on to found Chillmark Press shortly after he left CBS.

== Shows ==
=== Radio ===
Title	Year	Network	Notes
Quiz Kids	1940-1954	NBC, ABC, CBS	
Hollywood Jackpot	1946-1947	CBS	
Stop the Music	1948-1956	ABC, CBS	co-production with Mark Goodson
Hollywood Calling	1949-1950	NBC	

=== Television ===
Title	Year	Network	Notes
Quiz Kids	1949-1956	NBC, CBS	
Stop the Music	1949-1956	ABC	co-production with Mark Goodson
What's My Name?	1950-1953	NBC	
Remember This Date	1950-1951	NBC	
The Bert Parks Show	1950-1952	ABC	
Down You Go	1951-1956	DuMont, CBS, ABC, NBC	
Go Lucky	1951	CBS	
Cosmopolitan Theatre	1951	DuMont	
The Bill Goodwin Show	1951-1952	NBC	
Ask Me Another	1952	NBC	
Super Ghost	1952-1953	NBC	
Fearless Fosdick	1952-1953	NBC	
Balance Your Budget	1952-1953	CBS	
It's About Time	1954	ABC	
The $64,000 Question	1955-1958	CBS	
The Big Surprise	1955-1957	NBC	
The $64,000 Challenge	1956-1958	CBS	
Giant Step	1956-1957	CBS	
What's It For?	1957-1958	NBC	
How Do You Rate?	1958	CBS	
Top Dollar	1958-1959	CBS	
