= Edy Campagnoli =

Italian television personality and actress

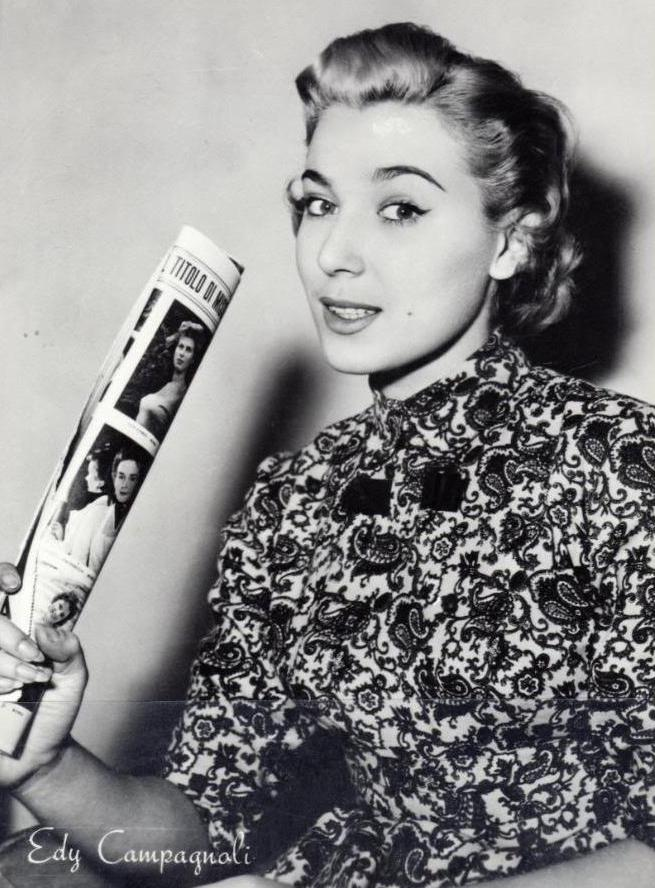
- Born: 12 June 1934; Milan, Kingdom of Italy
- Died: 6 February 1995 (aged 60); Milan, Italy
- Occupations: Television personality; actress

Edda "Edy" Campagnoli (Italian pronunciation: [ˈɛdda ˈɛːdi kampaɲˈɲɔːli]; 12 June 1934 – 6 February 1995) was an Italian television personality and actress.

== Life and career ==
Born in Milan, Campagnoli started her career as a runway model after World War II. In 1954 she played Venus in the opera La Vestale by Luchino Visconti.

Campagnoli made her television debut in the program Vetrine, then, noticed by a RAI manager, in 1955 she was chosen as the assistant of Mike Bongiorno in the popular quiz show Lascia o raddoppia?. In spite of the controversies surrounding her ornamental role, for which she was nicknamed la valletta muta (i.e. "the mute valet"), Campagnoli achieved a large popularity, as to be referred to as "the most famous woman in Italy".

After abandoning the quiz show in 1959, Campagnoli appeared in a number of other television programs, then she left the showbusiness in mid-1960s to pursue a career as a fashion businesswoman. She died at 60 years old from the consequences of a stroke. She had been married to Italian football goalkeeper Lorenzo Buffon for a time, although they later divorced. She had previously also dated Buffon's career rival, goalkeeper Giorgio Ghezzi.

== Filmography ==
Year	Title	Role	Notes
1956	La voce che uccide	Giovanna	
1956	Totò lascia o raddoppia?	Herself	
1956	I miliardari	Herself	
1965	I complessi	Herself	Segment "Guglielmo il Dentone" (final film role)
