= Totò lascia o raddoppia? =

1956 Italian comedy film

- Directed by: Camillo Mastrocinque
- Written by: Vittorio Metz; Marcello Marchesi
- Starring: Totò
- Cinematography: Mario Fioretti
- Music by: Lelio Luttazzi
- Release date: 1956
- Running time: 94 min
- Country: Italy
- Language: Italian

Totò lascia o raddoppia? ("Totò double or nothing?") is a 1956 Italian comedy film directed by Camillo Mastrocinque.

== Plot ==
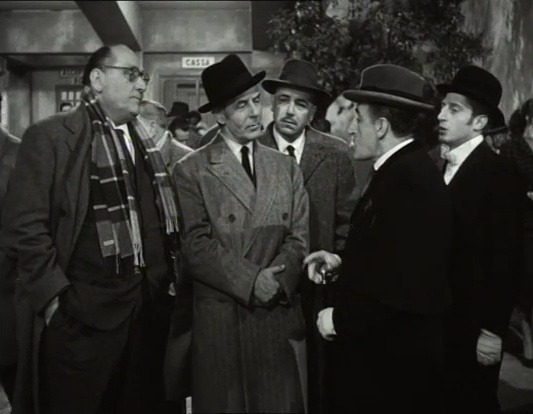

The Duke Gagliardo della Forcoletta decides to participate in the television quiz Lascia o raddoppia? in order to buy a bar for his daughter.

== Cast ==
- Totò: Duke Gagliardo della Forcoletta
- Dorian Gray: Hélène
- Mike Bongiorno: Himself
- Valeria Moriconi: Elsa Marini
- Carlo Croccolo: Camillo
- Rosanna Schiaffino: Colomba
- Bruce Cabot: Nick Molise
- Gabriele Tinti: Bruno Palmieri
- Luigi Pavese: Anastasio
- Elio Pandolfi: Osvaldo
- Rocco D'Assunta: Joe Taccola
- Edy Campagnoli: Herself
- Vincent Barbi : Molise's henchman
