= Teddy Nadler =

American television game show contestant (1909–1984)

Teddy Nadler (December 15, 1909 – May 23, 1984) was the highest-scoring American television game show contestant of the late 1950s.

== Biography ==
Born in St. Louis, Missouri, the former $70-a-week government warehouse clerk became the nation's favourite human encyclopedia by earning $264,000 (equivalent to $2,678,000 in 2022) on The $64,000 Question and its spinoff, The $64,000 Challenge. His record was not surpassed until 1980.

After fixing allegations against other high-scoring contestants were corroborated, many quiz programmes were cancelled. When his prize money started running out, Nadler tried applying for a temporary job with the US census bureau but failed the civil service exam.

An interviewer said Nadler could name all the Roman emperors and English monarchs, and recall the entire US Constitution and the entire script of William Shakespeare's Romeo and Juliet.
