= Stop the Music (American game show) =

- Country of origin: United States
- Language: English
- Home station: ABC Radio Network
- Original release: March 21, 1948 – August 10, 1952

Stop the Music
- Written by: Richard Adler
- Presented by: Bert Parks; Dennis James
- Country of origin: United States

Production
- Running time: 30 minutes
- Production companies: Louis G. Cowan, Inc. Mark Goodson

Original release
- Network: ABC (1949–1952; 1954–1956)
- Release: May 5, 1949 – June 14, 1956

Related
- Name That Tune

Stop the Music is a prime time radio game show that aired on ABC Radio on Sundays, from March 21, 1948 to August 10, 1952. Stop the Music crossed over to ABC television on Thursdays, beginning on May 5, 1949 through April 24, 1952, and again for a half-hour from September 7, 1954, to June 14, 1956.

During its first season, Stop the Music was broadcast on Sundays opposite The Fred Allen Show on NBC. This was the radio series responsible for eclipsing Allen's long-running comedy program in the Hooper ratings and forcing its demise. The concept was created by Mark Goodson, bandleader Harry Salter, and advertising executive Howard Connell. The show's hosts were Bert Parks and Dennis James. Similar to the later Name That Tune on NBC and then CBS, Stop the Music had players identify songs. After a song was played, a home viewer would be called and could win a prize by correctly naming the song. A correct guess won a prize and a chance to identify a short clip from the Mystery Melody for more prizes. If the viewer missed the first song, the viewer received a gift from the sponsor and members of the audience would be asked to identify the song. Among the vocalists and stars who appeared on Stop the Music were Jaye P. Morgan, Jimmy Blaine, June Valli, Broadway dancer Wayne Lamb, Estelle Loring, and Ann Sheridan.

The FCC unsuccessfully attempted to ban Stop the Music and other giveaway shows of its type from television and radio in August 1949. A judicial stay was placed on the FCC's order, and a final ruling would not be brought on the merits of the FCC ban until April 5, 1954, in FCC v. American Broadcasting Co., Inc., 347 U.S. 284 (1954), when giveaway shows like Stop the Music were unanimously ruled by the court to be legal.

When Stop the Music began airing on television in 1949, it aired at 9 pm ET on Thursdays for all five of its television seasons except for the 1954–1955 year, when it was broadcast at 10:30 pm ET on Tuesdays. Stop the Music finished at #23 in the Nielsen ratings for the 1950–1951 season. Its competition in the 1951–1952 year was The George Burns and Gracie Allen Show and Amos 'n' Andy, both on CBS. In its last season from 1955 to 1956, it was aired opposite Jackie Cooper's The People's Choice on NBC.

The show was created by Louis G. Cowan, previously known for creating the radio and TV series Quiz Kids and would later create the big money quiz show The $64,000 Question. During Stop the Music's radio run, one of the co-producers was Mark Goodson who with long-time partner Bill Todman had already created the radio hit Winner Take All, and would go on to create many television hit game shows such as What's My Line?, Beat the Clock, I've Got a Secret, To Tell the Truth, Password, Match Game, Family Feud, Card Sharks, and most notably, The Price Is Right.
