= Stanisława Ryster =

Polish lawyer and presenter

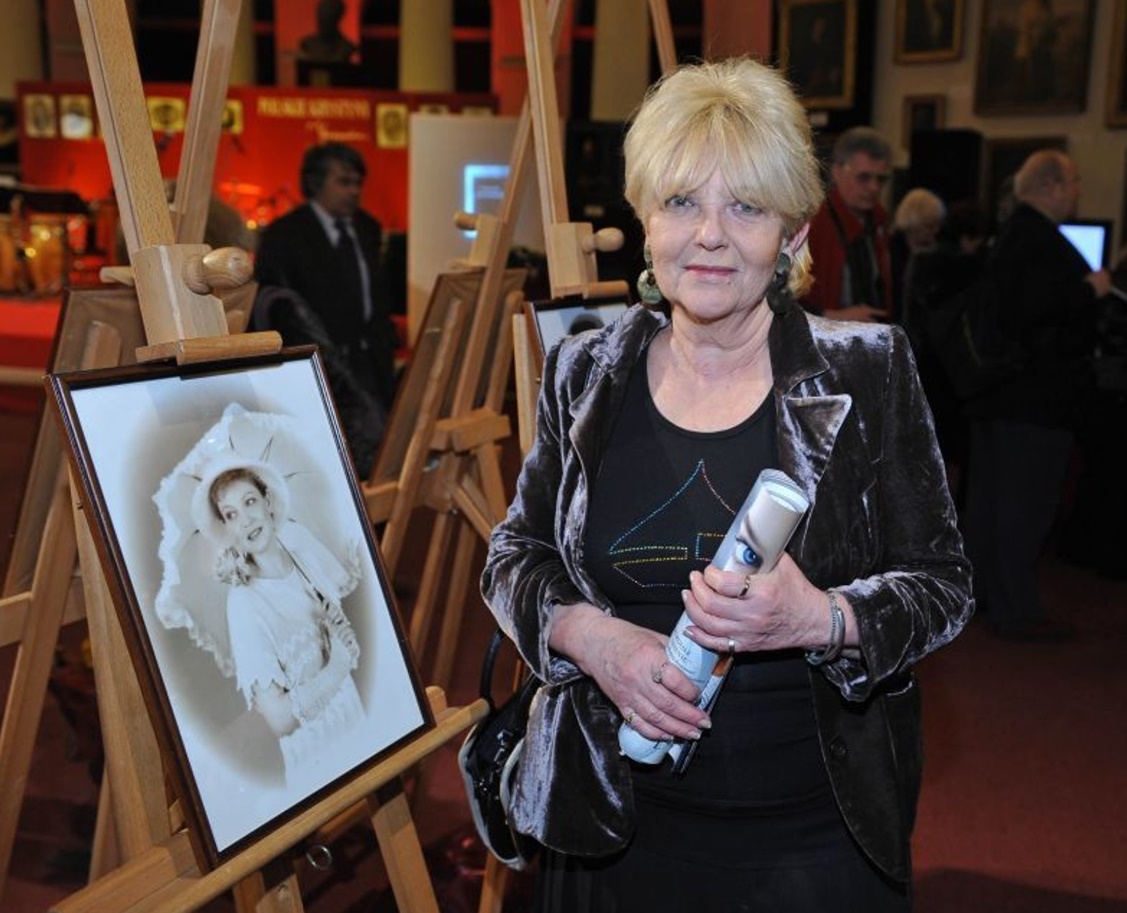

Stanisława Ryster née Tirk (2 May 1942 – 27 March 2024) was a Polish lawyer and presenter associated with the Polish Television (TVP), in the years 1975–2006 she was the host of the game show Wielka gra.

== Biography ==
Born in Lviv. She graduated from the Maria Konopnicka High School in Katowice and then studied law at the University of Warsaw.

In 1966, she began working in television, where she initially hosted youth programs and game shows. In 1975 she became the host of the game show Wielka gra on TVP, which she hosted continuously until 2006. In 2010 she returned to the TVP, hosting the program Wielka gra – na bis on TVP Polonia.

She was buried on 10 April 2024, in the grave of her parents (Norbert and Janina Tirk) at the Powązki Cemetery in Warsaw.

== Awards ==
- 1998 Super Wiktor for a television personality for lifetime achievement
- Fifth place in the 1999 Telekamery
