= The Big Surprise =

American TV quiz show

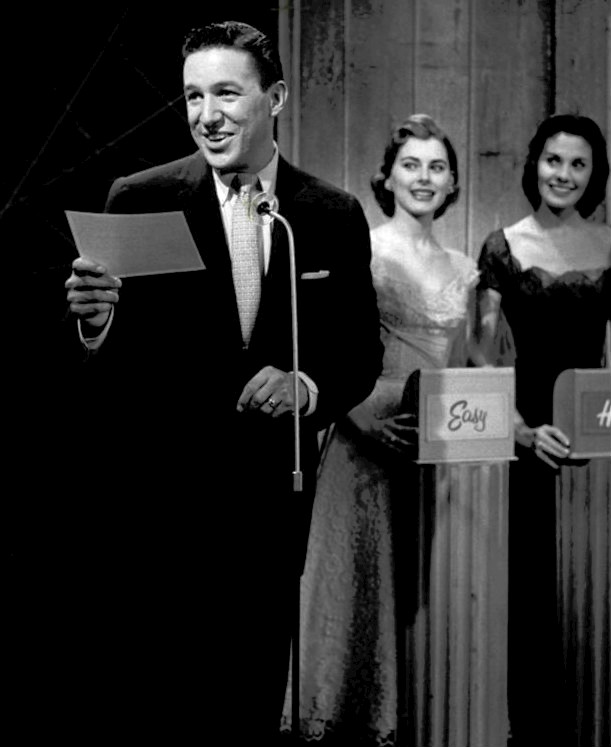
- Mike Wallace with Sue Oakland and Mary Gardiner, 1956.
- Genre: Game show
- Presented by: Jack Barry; Mike Wallace
- Announcer: Jack Clark
- Country of origin: United States
- No. of seasons: 2

Production
- Running time: 30 minutes
- Production companies: Louis G. Cowan, Inc. (1955-1956); Entertainment Productions (1956-1957)

Original release
- Network: NBC
- Release: October 8, 1955 – April 2, 1957

The Big Surprise is a television quiz show broadcast in the United States by NBC from October 8, 1955, to June 9, 1956, and from September 18, 1956, to April 2, 1957. It was hastily created by NBC in response to the ratings success of The $64,000 Question, which had premiered on CBS in summer 1955 and almost instantly became a hit. The Big Surprise offered a grand prize of $100,000.

The series was originally hosted by Jack Barry through March 3, 1956, after which he was replaced by Mike Wallace for the rest of the run. Barry would return to NBC a few months after leaving The Big Surprise with his own co-creations Tic-Tac-Dough and Twenty-One.

The show was initially produced by Louis G. Cowan, Inc., who soon changed its name to Entertainment Productions in 1956 before the show was cancelled.

In late 1959, The Big Surprise was one of the shows admitted to have been controlled by its producers and staff, under the umbrella of the 1950s quiz show scandals.

== Gameplay ==
Contestants who had performed an act of heroism or generosity were accompanied by "reporters" who explained why that contestant should be chosen. The contestant then answered questions about his or her family, friends, hometown, hobbies, and other special interests. Questions started in value at $1 and increased up to $100,000. An incorrect answer on any of the easy questions lost all winnings, while an incorrect answer on any of the hard questions lost half of the winnings.

If a contestant missed a question, another contestant could answer a question correctly and receive 10% of the original contestant's winnings, with the original contestant keeping the other 90%. While there were some alterations in the show's format over the next six months, it was basically a straight quiz with a few gimmicks such as two "insurance questions" which could be used, if answered correctly, to prevent the complete loss of winnings which otherwise occurred in the event of an incorrect answer to the regular questions. The questions were valued at $100, $200, $300, $1,000, $2,000, $3,000, $10,000, $20,000, $30,000, and $100,000.

Unlike The $64,000 Question, the contestant being queried did not stand in an isolation booth.

== Grand Prize winners ==
At least five people won the $100,000 grand prize:

- Ethel Park Richardson was the first grand prize winner; she won for her responses to questions about American folk music and folklore.
- 14-year-old George L. Wright III after correctly identifying a song of the 1920s
- Rear Admiral Redfield B. Mason with his knowledge of mythology
- 11-year-old Leonard Ross with his knowledge of the stock market
- Maisie Chen, native of China, with expertise in the Brooklyn Dodgers

== Broadcast history ==
The Big Surprise never approached the popularity of The $64,000 Question and had ended prior to the disclosure of the quiz show scandal, which forced all big-money game shows off the air in the United States for several years.

=== Episode status ===
Only the April 7, 1956, show is known to exist, which begins with guest contestant Errol Flynn going for $30,000. The rest were likely destroyed no later than the early 1970s along with most other NBC programming that had no rerun value.

== Controversies ==
=== 1956 Lawsuit ===
In late 1956, a contestant on The Big Surprise filed a lawsuit against the show, seeking $103,000 in monetary damages or reinstatement on the show as a contestant. Her claim was that, after being asked a question she did not know in a "warm-up" session, that she was asked the same question again during the televised show. Her assertion was that this was done intentionally, with the express purpose of eliminating her as a contestant. At the time of the lawsuit, Steve Carlin, executive producer of Entertainment Productions, Inc. (the producers of The Big Surprise) called this claim "ridiculous and hopeless".

=== Quiz Show congressional hearings ===
When congressional hearings were convened in 1959 concerning allegations that many of the big money quiz shows were managed, Carlin and an associate producer of the show, Mert Koplin, testified under oath that The Big Surprise had been controlled, and that the primary sponsor of the show, Revlon, knew it. Koplin described controlling The Big Surprise by asking questions of contestants in advance to determine what they knew, and then asking questions during the show accordingly. In some cases, when a contestant didn't know the answer to a question, Koplin would provide them with the answer in advance.
