= The $64,000 Question =

American game show

- Genre: Game show
- Written by: Joseph Nathan Kane
- Directed by: Seymour Robbie
- Presented by: Hal March
- Country of origin: United States
- Original language: English
- No. of seasons: 4

Production
- Executive producer: Steve Carlin
- Producers: Mert Koplin; Joseph Cates
- Production locations: New York City, New York, U.S.
- Camera setup: Multi-camera
- Running time: 22–24 minutes
- Production companies: Louis G. Cowan, Inc. (1955-1956); Entertainment Productions (1956-1958)

Original release
- Network: CBS
- Release: June 7, 1955 – November 2, 1958

The $64,000 Challenge
- Genre: Game show
- Presented by: Sonny Fox; Ralph Story
- Country of origin: United States
- Original language: English
- No. of seasons: 2

Production
- Running time: 22–24 minutes
- Production companies: Louis G. Cowan, Inc. (1956); Entertainment Productions (1956-1958)

Original release
- Network: CBS
- Release: April 8, 1956 – September 7, 1958

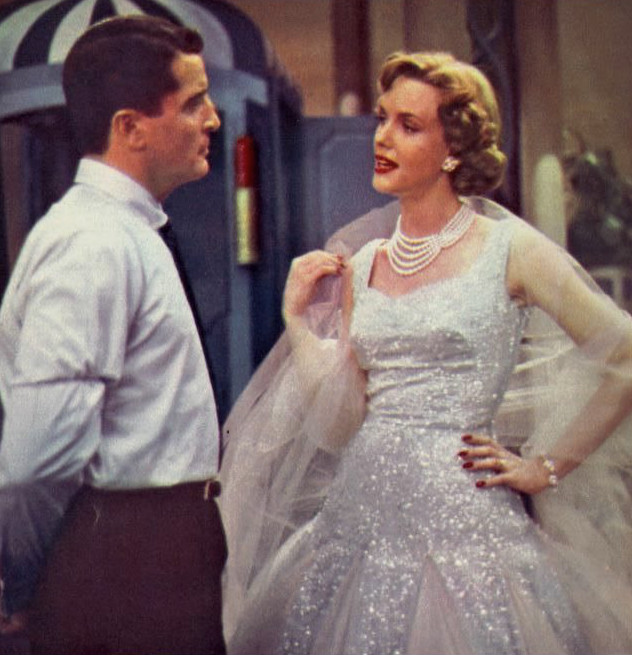
Hal March and Barbara Britton (Revlon spokeswoman) on the show's set (1955)

The $64,000 Question is an American game show broadcast in primetime on CBS from 1955 to 1958, which became embroiled in the 1950s quiz show scandals. Contestants answered general knowledge questions, earning money which doubled as the questions became more difficult. The final question had a top prize of $64,000 (equivalent to $770,000 in 2025), hence the "$64,000 Question" in the show's title.

The $64,000 Challenge (1956–1958) was its spin-off show, where contestants played against winners of at least $8,000 on The $64,000 Question.

The show was initially produced by Louis G. Cowan, Inc., who soon changed its name to Entertainment Productions in 1956 before the show ended. Cowan bought out the rights from Milton Biow, so just to develop the series.

== Origins ==
The $64,000 Question was largely inspired by the earlier CBS and NBC radio program Take It or Leave It, which ran on CBS radio from 1940 to 1947, and then on NBC radio from 1947 to 1952. After 1950, the radio show was renamed The $64,000 Question. The format of the show remained largely the same through its 12-year run; a contestant was asked a series of progressively more difficult questions which began at $1 and ended at a top prize of $64,000.

== Show creation ==
The $64,000 Question was created by Louis G. Cowan, formerly known for radio's Quiz Kids and the television series Stop the Music and Down You Go. Cowan drew the inspiration for the name from Take It or Leave It, and its $64 top prize offering. He decided to expand the figure to $64,000 for the new television program.

Cowan then convinced Charles Revson, owner of Revlon, to sign a sponsoring deal to finance the show for 13 weeks with the right to withdraw when they expired. Charles knew top competitor Hazel Bishop had increased its sales through sponsoring the popular This Is Your Life, and so decided to partner with the show.

The $64,000 Question premiered 7 June 1955, on CBS-TV, sponsored by cosmetics maker Revlon and originating from the start live from CBS-TV Studio 52 in New York (later the disco-theater Studio 54).

To increase the show's drama and suspense, and because of radio host Phil Baker's failure with Who's Whose, it was decided to use an actor rather than a broadcaster as the host. Television and film actor Hal March, familiar to TV viewers as a supporting regular on The George Burns and Gracie Allen Show and My Friend Irma, found fame as the quiz show's host, and Lynn Dollar worked as his assistant. Author and TV panelist Dr. Bergen Evans was the show's expert authority, and actress Wendy Barrie did the "Living Lipstick" commercials. To capitalize on the initial television success, the show was also simulcast for two months on CBS Radio where it was heard from October 4, 1955, to November 29, 1955.

== Gameplay ==
Contestants first chose a subject category (such as "Boxing", "Lincoln", "Jazz" or "Football") from the Category Board. Although this board was a large part of the set, it was seen only briefly, to conceal the fact that categories were sometimes quickly added to match a new contestant's subject. The contestant was then asked questions only in the chosen category, earning money which doubled ($64, $128, $256, $512; then $1,000, $2,000, $4,000, $8,000, $16,000, $32,000, and finally $64,000) as the questions became more difficult. At the $4,000 level, a contestant returned each week for only one question per week. The contestant could quit at any time and retire with their money, but until they reached the safety nets, they lost all winnings for answering a question incorrectly. The first safety net was $512, after four questions. The second safety net, $4,000, offered contestants a new Cadillac Series 62 (whose maximum MSRP was about $5,400). Starting with the $8,000 question, the contestant was placed in the Revlon "isolation booth", where they could hear nothing but the host's words. As long as the contestant kept answering correctly, they stayed on the show until they had won $64,000.

== Public reception ==
Almost immediately, The $64,000 Question beat every other program on Tuesday nights in ratings. Broadcast historian Robert Metz, in CBS: Reflections in a Bloodshot Eye, claimed U.S. President Dwight D. Eisenhower himself did not want to be disturbed while the show was on and that the nation's crime rate, movie theater, and restaurant patronage dropped when the show aired. It earned the #1 rating spot for the 1955–56 season, being the only television show to knock I Love Lucy out of the #1 spot, and finished at #4 in the 1956–57 season and #20 in 1957–58. Among its imitators or inspirations were The Big Surprise, Tic-Tac-Dough, and Twenty-One.

=== The $64,000 Challenge ===
Charles Revson did not execute his withdrawal right and wanted another way to take advantage of The $64,000 Question's audience. In April 8, 1956 The $64,000 Challenge was started (initially co-sponsored by Revlon and Lorillard Tobacco Company's Kent cigarettes), hosted through August 26 by Sonny Fox and then, for the remainder of the show's life, Ralph Story.

It pitted contestants against winners of at least $8,000 on The $64,000 Question in a new, continuing game where they could win another $64,000. The contestants took turns answering questions from the same category starting at the $1,000 level. If they each answered a question correctly, they advanced to the $2,000 level. Starting at the $4,000 level, both contestants answered the same question while each standing in their own isolation booth. If a contestant answered correctly with the other contestant missing a question, the winning contestant either kept the money and faced a new player, or continued playing against the same opponent at the next money level.

In time, the sister show came to include various celebrities, including bandleader Xavier Cugat and child star Patty Duke, as well as former The $64,000 Question champions.

The J. Fred & Leslie W. MacDonald Collection of the Library of Congress contains one kinescoped episode featuring Capt. Richard McCutchen as a contestant, broadcast July 1, 1956.

=== Everyday celebrities ===
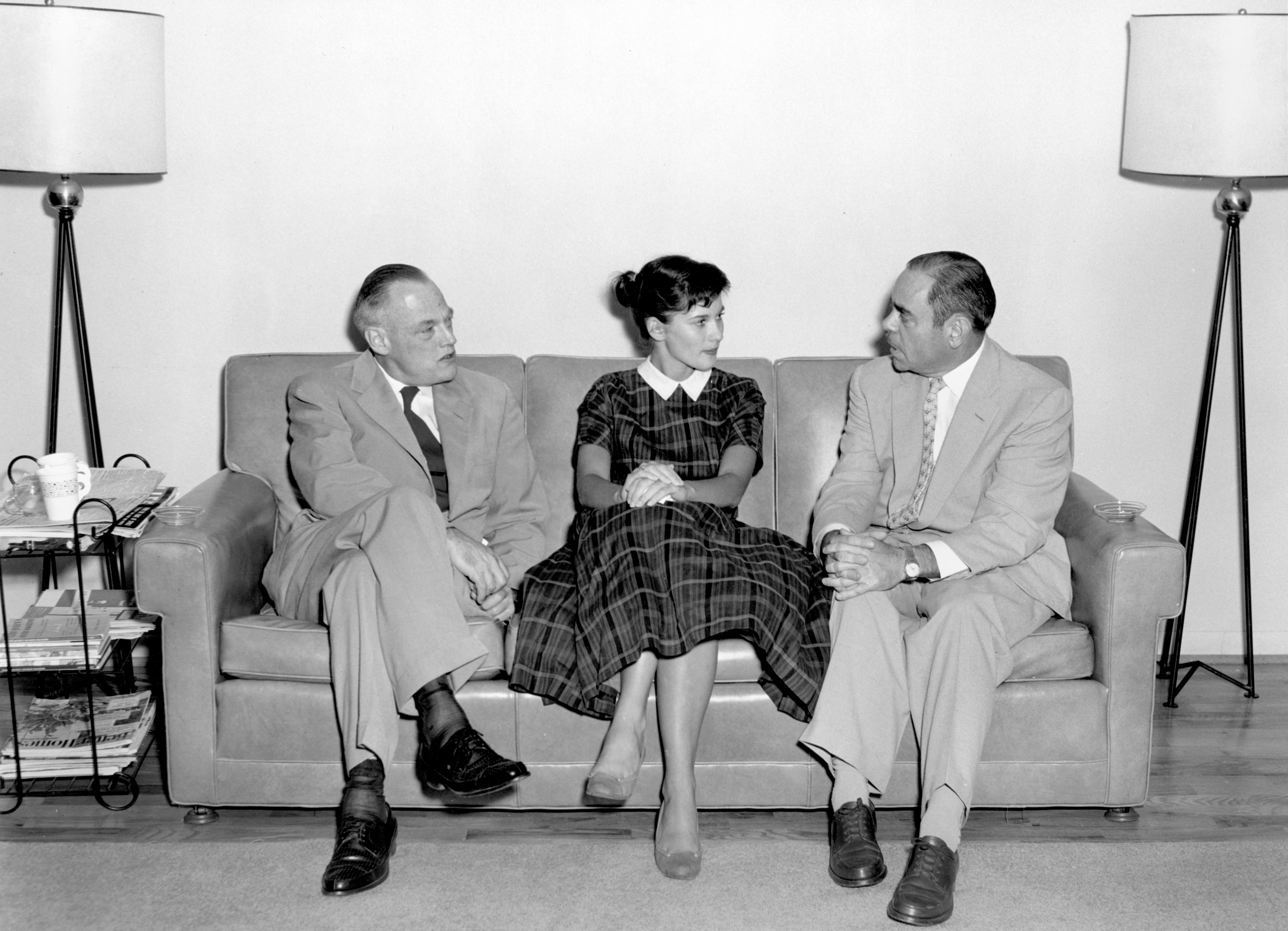
Joyce Myron, 18-year-old show winner who won $32,000 answering questions about atomic energy, pictured with William G. Pollard and Sam Sapirie at Oak Ridge (1957)

The $64,000 Question contestants sometimes became celebrities themselves for a short while, including 11-year-old Robert Strom (who won $192,000) and Teddy Nadler ($252,000 across both shows), the two biggest winners in the show's history. Other such newly made celebrities included Italian-born Bronx shoemaker Gino Prato, who won $32,000 for his encyclopedic knowledge of opera. The longest enduring of these celebrities was psychologist Joyce Brothers. Answering questions about boxing, she became the second top winner, and went on to a career providing psychological advice in newspaper columns and TV shows for the next four decades. Another winner, Pennsylvania typist Catherine Kreitzer, read Shakespeare on The Ed Sullivan Show. TV Guide kept a running tally of the money won on the show, which hit $1 million by the end of November 1956.

The American Experience (PBS) episode probing the scandal noted:

All the big winners became instant celebrities and household names. For the first time, America's heroes were intellectuals or experts–jockey Billy Pearson on art, Marine Captain McCutchen on cooking–every subject from the Bible to baseball. Not only had the contestants become rich overnight, but they were also treated to a whirlwind of publicity tours, awards, endorsements and meetings with dignitaries. Cobbler Gino Prato, whose category was opera, was brought to Italy for a special performance at la Scala and honored by an audience with the Pope. After winning $64,000, spelling whiz Gloria Lockerman, an African American, became a guest speaker at the 1956 Democratic National Convention ... Eleven-year-old stock market expert Lenny Ross was asked to open up the New York Stock Exchange.

=== Merchandising and parodies ===
One category on the Revlon Category Board was "Jazz", and within months of the premiere Columbia Records issued a 1955 album of various jazz artists under the tie-in title $64,000 Jazz (CL 777, also EP B-777), with the following tracks: "The Shrike" (Pete Rugolo), "Perdido" (J.J. Johnson, Kai Winding), "Laura" (Erroll Garner), "Honeysuckle Rose" (Benny Goodman), "Tawny" (Woody Herman), "One O'Clock Jump" (Harry James), "How Hi the Fi" (Buck Clayton), "I'm Comin', Virginia" (Eddie Condon), "A Fine Romance" (Dave Brubeck, Paul Desmond), "I Let A Song Go Out of My Heart" (Duke Ellington), and "Ain't Misbehavin'" (Louis Armstrong).

Other musical tie-ins included the 1955 song "The $64,000 Question (Do You Love Me)", recorded by Bobby Tuggle (Checker 823), Jackie Brooks (Decca 29684), and the Burton Sisters (RCA Victor 47-6265). "Love Is the $64,000 Question" (1956), which used the show's theme music by Norman F. Leyden with added Fred Ebb lyrics, was recorded by Hal March (Columbia 40684), Karen Chandler (Decca 29881), Jim Lowe (Dot 15456), and Tony Travis (RCA Victor 47-6476).

When the show was revived in 1976 as The $128,000 Question, its theme music and cues were performed (albeit with a new disco-style arrangement for the theme) by Charles Randolph Grean, who released a three-and-a-half-minute single, "The $128,000 Question" (the show's music and cues as an instrumental), with the B-side ("Sentimentale") on the Ranwood label (45 rpm release R-1064). For the show's second season, Grean's music package was re-recorded by Guido Basso.

There were numerous parodies of the program, including in the Foghorn Leghorn cartoon "Fox-Terror", Bob and Ray's The 64-Cent Question. The Jack Benny Program featured Hal March as a contestant in an October 20, 1957, spoof with Benny asking the questions. As a gag, Benny actually appeared as a contestant on The $64,000 Question on October 8, 1957, but insisted on walking away with $64 after answering the first question. Hal March finally gave him $64 out of his own pocket.

At the height of its popularity, The $64,000 Question was referenced in the scripts of other CBS shows, usually but not exclusively through punch lines that included references to "the isolation booth" or "reaching the first plateau". Typical of these was spoken by The Honeymooners' Ed Norton (Art Carney), who identified three times in a man's life when he wants to be alone, with the third being "when he's in the isolation booth of The $64,000 Question". At least three other Honeymooners episodes referenced The $64,000 Question: In A Woman's Work Is Never Done Ralph proposes to Alice that he go on the show because he's an expert in the "Aggravation" category. In Hello, Mom Norton tells Ralph that his mother-in-law's category on the show would be "Nasty". In The Worry Wart, Ralph advises Alice to become a contestant because she's an expert in the "Everything" category.

Another episode of The Honeymooners, delivered one of the best known The $64,000 Question references – a parody of the show itself, in one of the so-called "Original 39" episodes of the timeless situation comedy. In that episode, blustery bus driver Ralph Kramden becomes a contestant on the fictitious $99,000 Answer. Regarded as one of the Golden Age of Television's best quiz show parodies, the Honeymooners episode depicted Kramden spending a week intensively studying popular songs, only to blow the first question on the subject when he returned to play on the show. The host of the fictitious $99,000 Answer was one Herb Norris, played by former Twenty Questions emcee and future Tic-Tac-Dough host Jay Jackson.

The show has been referenced on other game shows. On the U.S. version of Deal or No Deal, an episode aired January 15, 2007, in which the banker's offer was $64,000. Host Howie Mandel said, "This is the $64,000 question".

In many money trees of most variations of the television series Who Wants to Be a Millionaire?, the amount of $64,000 is often included as the prize money awarded for correctly answering the 11th question.

== Scandal and cancellation ==
In mid-August 1958, while both The $64,000 Question and The $64,000 Challenge had already been announced as part of CBS's fall lineup, the network's quiz show Dotto was cancelled without explanation. A federal investigation was launched by the end of August on the allegation that a Dotto contestant had been given answers in advance. The probe soon included NBC's Twenty-One, and was expected to expand further.

In the first week of September, a contestant of Challenge, Rev. Charles Jackson, came forward to say he had been given answers in advance. On September 13, Lorillard Tobacco Company pulled its sponsorship of the show; this made the previous airing on September 7 the last for Challenge. The $64,000 Challenge was replaced on CBS with "a special news program" on September 14.

The $64,000 Question, which had not yet begun airing for the new season, assumed Challenge's Sunday time slot on September 21. After the federal probe of quiz shows surfaced, quiz shows suffered badly in the Fall 1958 Nielsen ratings. In late October, strong rumors had surfaced that The $64,000 Question was slated for movement to a less desirable time slot or cancellation. Cancellation was made official after The $64,000 Question's November 2 airing.

The game show ceased operations on November 21, 1958.

=== Scandal ===
The $64,000 Question was closely monitored by its sponsor's CEO, Revlon's Charles Revson, who often interfered with production, especially attempting to bump contestants he himself disliked, regardless of audience reaction. Revson's brother, Martin, was assigned to oversee production, including heavy discussions of feedback the show received.

According to The $64,000 Question producer Joe Cates, an IBM sorting machine was used to present lower dollar value questions, to give the illusion that the questions were randomly selected – in fact, all of the cards were identical.

Nadler's victory was called into question when he failed a civil service exam in 1960 applying a job for the United States Census Bureau. Producers eventually acknowledged he had been shown questions beforehand but not answers, noting that he already knew the answers beforehand; he was deemed innocent.

The most prominent victim may have been the man who initially launched the franchise. Louis Cowan, made CBS Television president as a result of The $64,000 Question's fast success, was forced out of the network as the quiz scandal ramped up, even though it was NBC's quiz shows bearing most of the brunt of the scandal – and even though CBS itself, with a little help from sponsor Colgate-Palmolive, had moved fast in cancelling the popular Dotto at almost the moment it was confirmed that that show had been rigged. Cowan was never suspected of attempting to rig either The $64,000 Question or The $64,000 Challenge; later CBS historians suggested his reputation as an administrative bottleneck may have had as much to do with his firing as his tie to the tainted shows. Cowan may have been wrongly accused in an attempt to stop any further scandal while the network tried to recover, and while president Frank Stanton accepted complete responsibility for any wrongdoing committed under his watch.

=== Aftermath ===
By the end of 1959, all first generation big-money quizzes were gone, with single-sponsorship television following and a federal law against fixing television game shows (an amendment to the 1960 Communications Act) coming. Over the course of the early 1960s, the networks wound down their five-figure jackpot game shows; Jackpot Bowling (1959–1961) and Make That Spare (1960–1964), which both escaped the fallout due to bowling being harder to fix, a period on Beat the Clock (1960) when its Bonus Stunt grew in $100 increments past the $10,000 mark until finally being won for $20,100 on September 23, You Bet Your Life (ended 1961) and the more lavish prize offerings on The Nighttime Price Is Right (1957–1964) were the few remaining shows offering large prizes. Only one traditional big-money quiz show, the short-lived ABC quiz 100 Grand (1963), was attempted in the following years; the networks stayed away from awarding five-figure cash jackpots until the premiere of The $10,000 Pyramid and Match Game 73 in 1973. The disappearance of the quiz shows gave rise to television's next big phenomenon–Westerns.

The scandals also resulted in a shift of the balance of power between networks and sponsors. The networks used the scandals to justify taking control of their programs away from sponsors, eliminating any potential future manipulation in prime-time broadcasting, and giving the networks full autonomy over program content.

None of the people directly involved in rigging the quiz shows faced any penalty other than suspended sentences for perjury before the federal grand jury that investigated the scandal, even if many hosts and producers found themselves frozen out of television for many years. One The $64,000 Question contestant, Doll Goostree, sued both CBS and the producers in a bid to recoup $4,000 she said she might have won if her match of The $64,000 Question had not been rigged. Neither Goostree nor any other quiz contestant who similarly sued won their cases.

- Louis Cowan – In addition to Quiz Kids (1949–1951) and Stop the Music (1949–1952, 1954–1956), Cowan also created Down You Go (1951–1956) and the short-lived Ask Me Another (1952). Cowan briefly served as CBS Television Network president before leaving in the wake of the quiz show scandals. He later joined the faculty of the Columbia University school of journalism. He and his wife Polly were killed in an apartment fire in New York City in 1976. Lou Cowan's son Geoffrey later produced brief revivals of Quiz Kids in the 1970s, 1980s, and 1990s and is currently dean of the University of Southern California Annenberg School for Communication.
- Hal March – The former comic actor who became an overnight star on The $64,000 Question continued to appear as an actor in television and movies during the 1950s and 1960s. Shortly after he signed on as host of It's Your Bet in 1969, he was diagnosed with lung cancer and died in 1970, four months short of his 50th birthday.
- Irwin "Sonny" Fox – The first Challenge host was also known at the time for co-hosting the CBS children's travelogue Let's Take a Trip (Fox described it as "Taking two children on sort of an electronic field trip every week–live, remote location, no audience, no sponsors"), but his fame rests predominantly on his eight-year (1959–1967) stint as the fourth host of New York City's Sunday morning children's marathon, Wonderama. Fox hosted Way Out Games (1976–1977), a Saturday-morning series for CBS, then later spent a year (1977–1978) running children's programming for NBC and eventually became a chairman of the board for Population Communications International, a nonprofit dedicated to "technical assistance, research and training consultation to governments, NGOs and foundations on a wide range of social marketing and communications initiatives". Fox had also been a board chairman for the National Academy of Television Arts and Sciences. He died in 2021.
- Patty Duke – A child star (thanks to her Broadway portrayal of Helen Keller) when she appeared on Challenge, she eventually testified to Congressional investigators – and broke to tears when she admitted she had been coached to speak falsely, an incident Sonny Fox described when interviewed for the PBS program reviewing the quiz scandals. Duke survived to become a television star (The Patty Duke Show) in the early-to-mid-1960s, before moving on to more film and television work (including a role in Valley of the Dolls), becoming an activist in the Screen Actors Guild, writing two memoirs (Call Me Anna and A Brilliant Madness) describing her troubled child acting career and her lifelong battle with manic depression, and becoming an advocate for better protection and benefits for child actors, as both of her biological children, Sean Astin and Mackenzie Astin, became actors themselves. She died on March 29, 2016, from sepsis, resulting from a ruptured intestine.
- Charles Revson – Inspired by cosmetics competitor Hazel Bishop (whose sponsoring of This Is Your Life provided big sales to Bishop) to think about television sponsorship in the first place, Revson was never investigated in his own right for his role in the quiz show scandals despite testifying (as did his brother, Martin) before Congress when the scandals broke in earnest. The cosmetics empire he founded, however, continued its success – and continued to sponsor television programming – for many years after the scandals faded away. Revson's success left him a billionaire when he died in 1975. His charitable foundation has since given over $145 million in grants to schools, hospitals, and service organizations in various Jewish communities.
- Dr. Joyce Brothers – Only the second contestant to win the show's big prize (after successfully preventing numerous attempts to bump her from the show because Martin Revson was said to have disliked her and doubted her credibility as a boxing expert), Brothers enjoyed the most enduring fame and media success among anyone who became famous thanks to The $64,000 Question. Her championship as a boxing expert led to an invitation to become a commentator for CBS' telecast of a championship boxing match between Sugar Ray Robinson and Carmen Basilio. In August 1958, shortly after she earned her license to practice psychology in New York, Brothers was given her own television program, first locally in New York and then in national syndication. Making numerous television and radio appearances as a psychologist, not to mention numerous television comedy roles, Brothers also wrote for a long-running syndicated advice column in newspapers and magazines, which was used as a source for some questions on the 1998–2004 revival of Hollywood Squares. She is still considered, arguably, the first media psychologist. She died from respiratory failure on May 13, 2013, at age 85.
- Ralph Story – He became the host of Ralph Story's Los Angeles (1964–1970), still considered the highest-rated local show in Los Angeles television history. Story has also hosted A.M. Los Angeles and was the narrator for the ABC series Alias Smith and Jones in 1972–1973. He died on September 26, 2006, at the age of 86.

== Revivals ==
Selected PBS outlets showed surviving kinescopes of the original The $64,000 Question in Summer 1976, as a run-up to a new version of the show called The $128,000 Question, which ran for two years. The first season was hosted by Mike Darrow and produced at the Ed Sullivan Theater in New York City, while the second was produced at Global Television Network in Toronto, Ontario, Canada and hosted by Alex Trebek.

In 1999, television producer Michael Davies attempted to revive The $64,000 Question as The $640,000 Question for ABC, before abandoning that project to produce an American version of the British game show Who Wants to Be a Millionaire?.

Who Wants to Be a Millionaire? has a format very similar to The $64,000 Question – 15 questions in which the contestant's money roughly doubles with each correct question until reaching the top prize. However, the quizzes in Millionaire are of a broader variety than The $64,000 Question's one-category line of quizzes and have a different category for each question, all of which are multiple choice. Contestants are allowed to leave the game with their money after a question is revealed but before it is answered, and Millionaire offers three chances for help (called "lifelines"), which were not present in The $64,000 Question.

In 2000, responding to the success of Millionaire, CBS bought the rights to the property in a reported effort to produce another revival attempt, called $64,000 Question (with a top prize of $1,024,000), to be hosted by sportscaster Greg Gumbel. Because of format issues similar to those encountered by Davies for ABC, a pilot was taped on April 19, 2000, but was never broadcast. John Ricci, Jr. and Wink Martindale uploaded that full pilot as part of their ongoing The Game Show Vault (formerly Wink's Vault prior to Martindale's death because of an agreement with Ricci and Sandy Martindale afterwards) series on their YouTube page as a tribute to Gumbel shortly after his death on December 29, 2024.

== United States broadcast history ==
- The $64,000 Question – CBS television; June 7, 1955 – June 24, 1958 (Tuesday 10:00 p.m.); September 14 – November 9, 1958 (Sunday 10:00 p.m.). Simulcast on CBS Radio from October 4 to November 29, 1955.
- The $64,000 Challenge – CBS television; April 8, 1956 – September 14, 1958; Sunday 10:00 p.m.
- The $128,000 Question – syndicated weekly television, September 18, 1976 – September 1978.

== International versions ==
Country	Name	Host	Channel	Years aired
Australia	Coles £3000 Question (1960–1966); Coles $6000 Question (1966–1971); The $7000 Question (1971)	Malcolm Searle (1960–1963); Roland Strong (1963–1971)	Seven Network	1960–1971
Denmark	Kvit eller dobbelt	Svend Pedersen (1957–1959); Otto Leisner (1984–1985); Per Wiking (1990); Alex Nyborg Madsen (1999); Christian Trangbæk (2013)	DR	1957–1959; 1984–1985; 1990; 1999; 2013
Finland	Tupla tai kuitti	Kirsti Rautiainen (1958–1988); Kirsi Salo (2007–2008)	Tesvisio (1958–1965); MTV (1965–1988); MTV3 (2007–2008)	1958–1988; 2007–2008
Italy	Lascia o raddoppia?	Mike Bongiorno (1955–1959, 1979); Bruno Gambarotta with Lando Buzzanca (1989); Bruno Gambarotta with Giancarlo Magalli (1990)	Programma Nazionale; Rete 1; Rai 1	1955–1959; 1979; 1989–1990
Mexico	El Gran Premio de los 64,000 pesos	Pedro Ferriz Santacruz	Various	1956–1994
Poland	Wielka gra	Ryszard Serafinowicz (1962–1969); Joanna Rostocka (1969–1973); Janusz Budzyński (1973–1975); Stanisława Ryster (1975–2006)	TVP1 (1962–1978); TVP2 (1978–2006)	1962–2006
South Korea	The 100,000 Hwan Quiz	Unknown	DBC	Late 1950s
Sweden	Kvitt eller dubbelt (1957–1959, 1981–1982); Utmaningen (1960); Tiotusenkronorsfrågan (1961, 1966); Tiotusenkronorsduellen (1967); Nya tiotusenkronorsfrågan (1973)	Nils Erik Bæhrendtz (1957–1960, 1973); Bengt Feldreich (1961); Bo Teddy Ladberg (1966); Birgitta Sandstedt (1967); Ingvar Holm (1981–1982)	SVT	1957–1961; 1966–1967; 1973; 1981–1982
United Kingdom	The $64,000 Question	Jerry Desmonde (1956–1957, 1957–1958); Robin Bailey (1957); Bob Monkhouse (1990–1993)	ATV (1956–1958); Central (1990–1993)	1956–1958; 1990–1993

=== Australia ===
A similar version of The $64,000 Question was broadcast in Australia from 1960 to 1971 on Seven Network. Initially called Coles £3000 Question, the show changed its name to Coles $6000 Question on February 14, 1966 (the date Australia converted to decimal currency) and was sponsored for most of its run by Coles Stores. In July 1971, Coles dropped its sponsorship and the show became The $7000 Question. It was hosted by Malcolm Searle (1960–1963) and Roland Strong (1963–1971).

=== Denmark ===
A Danish version of the show called Kvit eller dobbelt was made in Denmark. The show originally aired from 1957 to 1959, with a top prize of 10,000 Danish kroner. It was revived in 1984, then again in 1990 and again in 1999. The latest revival in 2013 was aimed at kids and also included kids as participants.

=== Italy ===
The Italian version of this quiz was Lascia o raddoppia? (1955–1959). The prize money doubled from 2,560,000 lire to 5,120,000 lire.

=== Mexico ===
The Mexican version, El Gran Premio de los 64,000 pesos, lasted from 1956 to 1994 with some interruptions, changes of name to compensate peso devaluation, and changes of TV network. Most of the time it was hosted by Pedro Ferriz. A movie was made in which Ferriz asks questions to a character played by Sara García, known then as "Mexican Cinema's Granny".

=== Poland ===
The Polish version of this quiz was Wielka gra ("The Great Game", 1962–2006). Initially the rules and the studio set-up matched the original's, but in 1975 both were changed by Wojciech Pijanowski, creator, producer, writer, and/or host of many quiz shows in Poland in the late 20th century, as the isolation booth was abandoned and a large turntable was added in the center of the studio floor, displaying the prize amount for each round, upon which the envelopes containing the questions were placed. The categories became more specific (e.g., Mozart—life and compositions, Muslim conquests in the 7th–8th centuries), were limited to art, history (most categories), geography, and zoology, and were now chosen by players during the elimination rounds.

After 1975, the game had the following rounds:

- The first round was a duel between two players; it consisted of up to 20 questions and lasted until one player had gotten two questions wrong. Players wore headphones playing loud music in order not to hear during each other's turns.
- The second round was an "exam", in which the player who had won the duel now had to answer three questions from each of three experts in a category. The player could make up to two mistakes. If successful, the player then received a prize.
- In the third, fourth, and final rounds, the player drew envelopes with questions from the big turntable, with the prize doubling each round. The grand prize changed over the years: primarily it was 25,000 złoty (about equal to the average annual wage); later it was 40,000 zlotys (c. $12,000). The hosts were Ryszard Serafinowicz (1962–1969), Joanna Rostocka (1969–1973, previously Serafinowicz's co-host), Janusz Budzyński (1973–1975) and Stanisława Ryster (1975–2006).

Although the show was cancelled due to low viewership, the cancellation was controversial because of how highly regarded it was by many people, especially those who were still watching it, and because some games that were planned or already in progress were not completed.

There were plans to revive the show in 2016 as Większa gra ("The Greater Game") in an altered format, but eventually those plans were cancelled.

=== Sweden ===
The Swedish version of this quiz was Kvitt eller dubbelt (1957–1982).

=== United Kingdom ===
There were three derived versions in the UK: earlier, The 64,000 Question, The 64,000 Challenge (both with no dollar sign), and later, The $64,000 Question.

== Connections ==
=== Spoofed in ===
- The Honeymooners: "The $99,000 Answer" (first aired January 28, 1956); Ralph becomes a contestant on a quiz show, but nervously answers his first question incorrectly.
- The Phil Silvers Show: "It's for the Birds". Bilko discovers one of his platoon is an expert on birds. He signs Pvt. Honnegan (played by Fred Gwynne) up for The $64,000 Question TV show. First broadcast on September 25, 1956.
- Fox-Terror (Looney Tunes short, 1957)
- The Jack Benny Program: Hal March Show (#8.3) (1957). Host Hal March appears in Jack Benny's version of the game show.

== In popular culture ==
The phrase the $64,000 question is an idiom and is routinely used as a way of saying the most important question. It is derived from the fact that the ultimate question on the show was indeed, the $64,000 question.
