= Carmelita Pope =

American actress (1924–2019)

Carmelita Pope (April 15, 1924 – April 3, 2019) was an American actress of stage and screen.

== Early life ==
Born in Chicago, Illinois, Pope was the younger of two daughter of Nicholas Papa who had emigrated from Senerchia, Campania, Italy and his Italian-American wife Marie. Her father was a vaudeville performer who later became a lawyer. Her older sister Clarissa Pope Mancuso was also an actress. The younger Pope sister graduated from Providence High School. She later matriculated at the Goodman School of Drama and Marycrest College.

She became friends with another aspiring actor, Jocelyn Brando, and also became friends with her brother, Marlon Brando. The two developed a close bond. Brando frequently stayed at Pope's home, where they played bocce ball together.

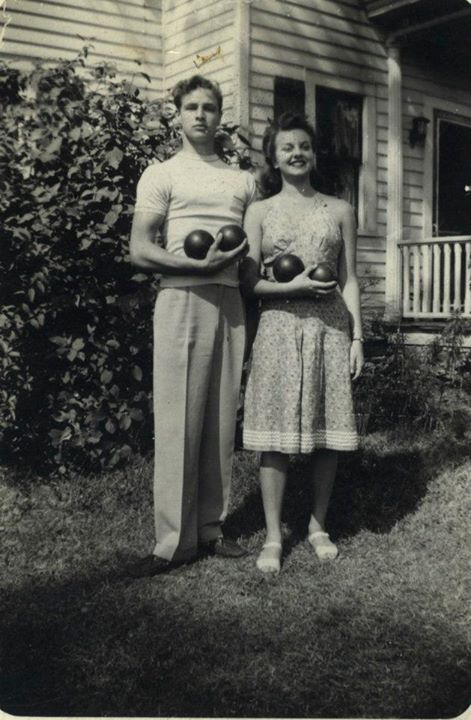
Pope and Brando outside her home in Chicago

== Career ==
Pope's break as an actor came when she was cast by George Abbott as the lead, Corliss Archer, first as a replacement in the Chicago cast and subsequently in the U.S.O. production of his play Kiss and Tell that was to tour Italy and Northern Africa in 1945.

Upon her return stateside, Pope replaced Cecily De Lucas in the role of Daisy Belle in the comedy Maid in the Ozarks at the Belasco Theatre on Broadway

It was Pope's performance as anointed saint Mother Cabrini in the 1947 film Citizen Saint (under her stage name, Carla Dare) that drew the attention of director Elia Kazan. He subsequently cast her as Kim Hunter's understudy in the Broadway production of A Streetcar Named Desire. She was reunited with childhood friend Marlon Brando, who was playing Stanley.

After the announcement that a large portion of the original cast (including Kim Hunter) would be leaving A Streetcar Named Desire in 1949, the producers put out a casting call for actors to replace them. Hunter, who had never missed a performance, told Pope that she would fake an illness and miss a day so that Pope could perform for the producers. Surprising even Pope herself, Hunter did call out sick one day, and Pope went on. She signed her contract to play Stella the next day. Pope remained with the production until it closed.

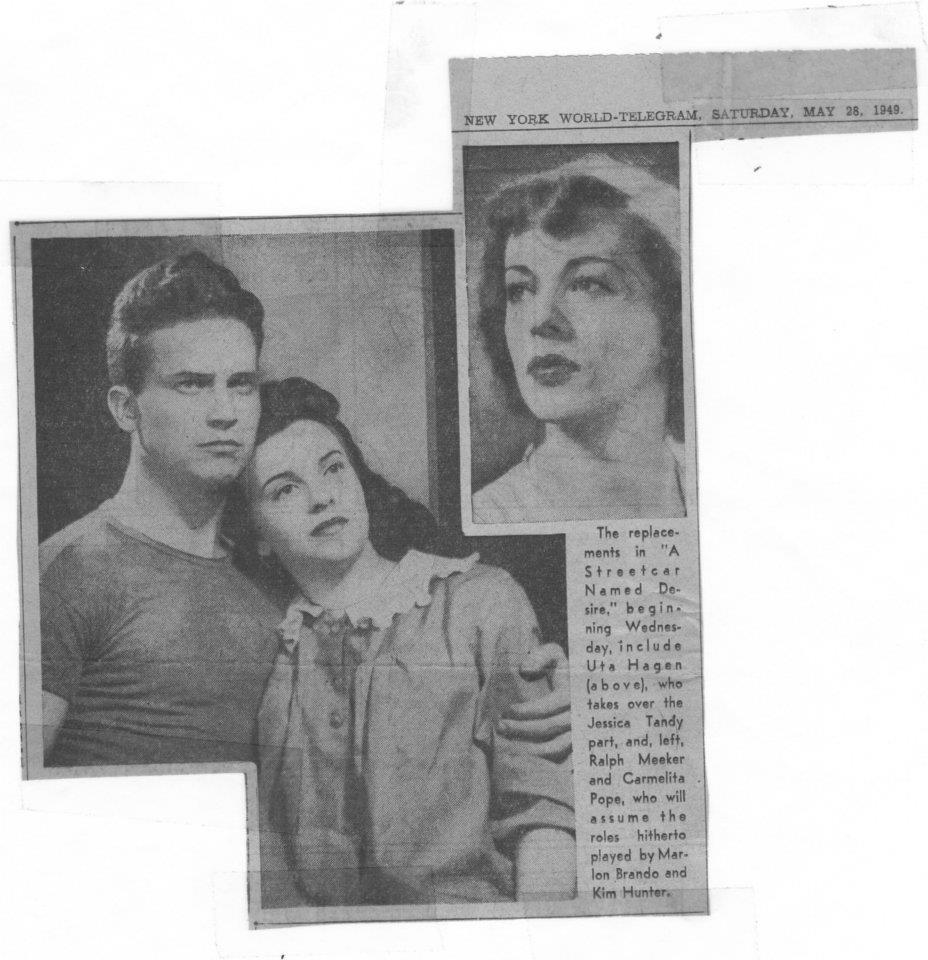
Press Release - New York World

Pope married Chicago ad man Howard Charles Ballenger II in April 1949, and the pair moved to Chicago, where they raised two sons. She starred as a panelist on the television show Down You Go in the 1950s, did numerous radio spots, and was also the spokeswoman for Pam Cooking Spray. She also appeared in the soap operas General Hospital and Days of Our Lives.

== Personal life ==
Following the death of her husband Howard Charles Ballenger II of Highland Park, Illinois in 1975, Pope moved to Los Angeles, where she served as the director of the Hollywood office of the American Humane Association. She remarried in 1988 and retired to Stuart, Florida.

Pope lived in Boise, Idaho, where she volunteered at the Warhawk Air Museum. She died of heart failure at age 94 at her home in Boise on April 3, 2019.
