= Ralph Story =

American journalist (1920–2006)

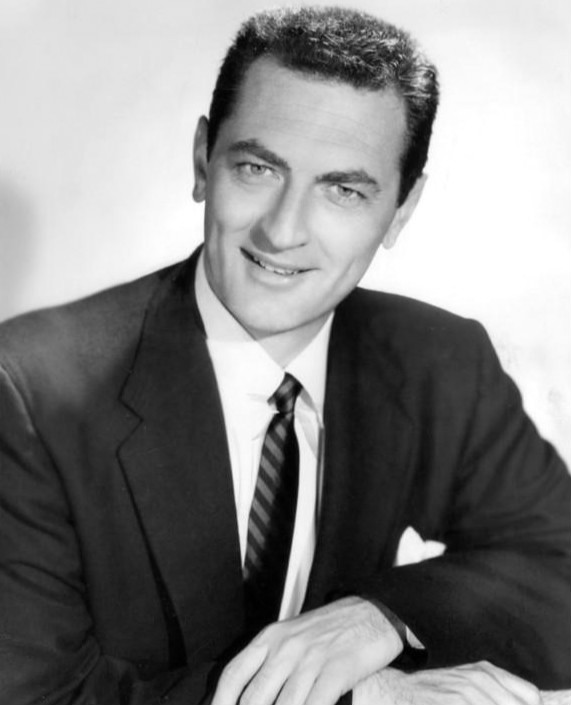
- Story in 1956.
- Born: Ralph Bernard Snyder; August 19, 1920; Kalamazoo, Michigan, U.S.
- Died: September 26, 2006 (aged 86); Santa Ynez, California, U.S.
- Occupation: Broadcaster
- Spouse: Diana (m. 1978)

Ralph Story (born Ralph Bernard Snyder; August 19, 1920 – September 26, 2006) was an American television and radio personality. He was best known as the host of The $64,000 Challenge from 1956 to 1958, and as the writer and host of Ralph Story's Los Angeles from 1964 to 1970.

== Biography ==
Story was born in Kalamazoo, Michigan. He started his broadcasting career in the late 1940s, after serving as a United States Army Air Forces flight instructor and P-51 fighter pilot during World War II. Story had his big break in broadcasting in 1948, when he was hired to host and direct an early morning show on KNX radio in Los Angeles. At the suggestion of the station's managers, he changed his name to Ralph Story. Story's casual style and witty observations about life in Los Angeles made him a popular host and won him national recognition.

Story later moved into network television, where, in 1956, he began hosting the hugely popular game show, The $64,000 Challenge. The CBS show was canceled in 1958 while several networks were embroiled in allegations that popular contestants were supplied with answers in advance.

=== Television journalism ===
Story, who was not implicated in the scandal, returned to local broadcasting in 1960. He returned to KNX, this time anchoring a news program and later joined The Big News, one of the nation's first hour-long local TV newscasts, on KNXT (sister station to KNX radio, owned and operated by CBS). His regular feature, Human Predicament, about people caught in unusual events and situations, became a popular segment. It developed into a local news magazine program about the people and places of Los Angeles called Ralph Story's Los Angeles. It aired for six years.

Ralph Story's Los Angeles aired from 1964 to 1970 on KNXT. Created by producer/director Dan Gingold, it featured the work of two writers, Jere Witter and Nate Kaplan. Wittily hosted by Story, the show examined interesting features, events and sites documenting the history and culture of Los Angeles. Generations of Angelenos developed a passion for their city as a result of this documentary-style show. Select episodes of Ralph Story's Los Angeles are housed at the UCLA Film & Television Archive and are available for public viewing by advance appointment via the Archive Research and Study Center located in Powell Library, room 46 on the UCLA campus. In "Lucy Meets Ken Berry," a 1968 episode of The Lucy Show, Story played himself as the host of Ralph Story's Los Angeles.

Story joined KABC-TV in February 1971, co-hosting Ralph Story's A.M., a morning news show produced by Howard P. Campbell with Stephanie Edwards and newsman Bob Banfield that became the precursor to Good Morning America. In one episode, they explored the way that a new Baskin-Robbins ice cream flavor was developed by creating the Apricot Marmalade flavor (to match the "AM" initials).

When the program evolved into GMA and moved to New York City, Story stayed in Los Angeles, where he continued working as a writer, producer, and reporter for several TV stations. After a brief stint on KNBC, he returned to KNXT (which later became KCBS-TV) in 1978 as an evening anchor for Channel 2 News alongside Marcia Brandwynne and later Sandy Hill. In 1985, Story retired and moved to Santa Barbara County's wine region, where he and his second wife, Diana, operated an art gallery in Los Olivos. In 1989, Ralph appeared in the television film, Ernest Goes to Splash Mountain which was shot in Disneyland. He volunteered for numerous civic groups, serving as a fundraiser for public television stations, narrator for the Hollywood Bowl and judge of the Rose Parade. In 1995, he wrote and hosted a program for KCET about Los Angeles landmarks called Things That Aren't Here Anymore, following it up with a 1998 sequel entitled More Things That Aren't Here Anymore.

== Death ==
Story died on September 26, 2006, in Santa Ynez, California from complications due to emphysema, and was survived by his wife and one son from his first marriage. He was cremated at Neptune Society in Santa Barbara, California. His urn vault was buried in Ballard, California's Oak Hill Cemetery. His memorial service was held at St. Mark's Episcopal Church on October 8, 2006 in Los Olivos, California.

== Awards ==
In 1984, the Academy of Television Arts & Sciences honored him with its highest honor, the Governor's Award. After Story's death, Hollywood columnist Rona Barrett said that "no one told a story on television better than Ralph." Former colleague Warren Olney described Ralph Story as "a master of the craft."
