= Leonard Ross =

American academic (1945–1985)

- Born: July 7, 1945
- Died: May 1, 1985 (aged 39); Santa Clara, California, U.S.
- Education: University of California, Los Angeles; Yale Law School
- Known for: Child prodigy; game show contestant
- Television: The Big Surprise; The $64,000 Question

Leonard "Lenny" M. Ross, (July 7, 1945 – May 1, 1985) was an American teacher, lawyer, and government official who was famous for his celebrity as a child prodigy and television game show contestant. Ross's game show winnings, totaling $164,000 (equivalent to $1,880,000 in 2025), were for two months in the spring of 1957 the highest ever earned on a United States television game show.

== Early years ==
Ross was born to Pauline Ross on July 7, 1945. Ross was known as a prodigy and a genius. At age 7 years, he gained national attention by passing a federal examination for a ham radio operator's license, eventually holding call W6SJR. At 10 years, he became known as the ''whiz kid'' who won $100,000 on The Big Surprise, a television quiz show. Many of the questions he correctly answered concerned the stock market. As a prize, he became the first guest to ring the opening bell at the New York Stock Exchange. At 11 years, on February 10, 1957, Ross won $64,000 on The $64,000 Challenge. This total made Ross the highest winner of game show prize money for two months, until passed by another child contestant, Robert Strom, on April 16.

At 14 years, Ross was graduated from high school and immediately matriculated at Reed College. In his senior year, he transferred to the University of California at Los Angeles to be closer to his family.

In 1963, at the age of 18 years, Ross entered Yale Law School. While there, he was editor-in-chief of the Yale Law Journal. He began seeing a psychoanalyst to manage his neurotic tendencies. He graduated at 20 years, and went on to study at Yale's graduate school of economics for three years. Reports conflict on whether he graduated or if he failed to write his doctoral dissertation.

== Career ==
Ross was awarded a teaching fellowship at Harvard in the early 1970s. He then went on to teach at Columbia Law School. He also became involved in politics and held positions of public service. After resigning from Columbia University, Ross joined the California gubernatorial campaign of Edmund Gerald Brown, Jr., (Jerry Brown), becoming a part of the "issues and ideas staff". Later, he would aid in creating Mr. Brown's first budget. In 1975, Ross accepted an appointment to the California Public Utilities Commission under Brown, making him one of the youngest members of the commission. The appointment was to last six years, but Ross resigned after just two. He then went on to serve President Jimmy Carter in the State Department. There, he worked as an advisor to a former professor at Yale, Richard Cooper, who was the under-secretary for economic affairs. Ross resigned from this position after one year and slipped into a deep depression.

While in Boston in 1978, Ross was awarded a foundation grant to do a monograph on nuclear proliferation. Upset about a failed romance, Ross attempted suicide and was admitted to McLean Hospital, a private psychiatric clinic outside Boston. Upon his release, he moved back to California and joined the faculty at Boalt Hall, the University of California law school on the Berkeley campus. He resigned from the faculty in 1984 following a brief stay in the hospital after students found him under his car, rehearsing his lecture, in the parking lot of the school. He then went on to work for a small law firm in San Francisco, where he was to be the "idea man" with no strenuous legal work, but the deterioration of his mind made concentrating an impossible task.

During his career, Ross tended to co-author books and articles with partners who would see the work through to completion—a task which was near impossible for Ross with his racing mind. He co-wrote a book about students' legal rights during the Vietnam War draft called ''The Lottery and the Draft: Where Do I Stand?''. With Peter Passell, a fellow professor at Columbia University, Ross co-wrote "Retreat from Riches: Affluence and Its Enemies" about a national policy of rapid growth being the only way to reduce poverty in America. In April 1972, Ross co-authored a strenuous attack on the newly published book The Limits to Growth in The New York Times.

In total, Ross co-wrote or wrote three books on economics, articles for the New York Review of Books and The New York Times, and a popular compendium of the best of everything from pizzas to police precincts called ''The Best.''

== Death ==
Ross's life unraveled as his mood swings and impatience with himself and the world became uncontrollable. Ross was aware his mental state was deteriorating and aggressively sought out physical solutions for his mental ailments. Convinced his emotional problems had a physical cause, Ross spent a considerable amount of time in medical libraries researching new and unorthodox treatments to cure himself. Among the treatments he tried were elaborate drug regimens, shock treatments, and brain surgery. The surgery, a cingulotomy, was performed at Massachusetts General Hospital and consisted of snipping a circuit in the limbic system. The surgery failed to alleviate his depression.

Those around Ross attempted to intervene and help. His friends lent him money and tried to find him jobs that were better suited for his mental state. In April 1985, Ross moved in with his brother, Daniel, accepting Daniel's and his mother's help. On May 1, 1985, at 39 years, Ross died by suicide in the pool of Capri Motel in Santa Clara, California.

After his death, a psychiatrist who had treated Ross remarked, "the early fame and brilliant success of his youth ruined him. Being a child prodigy is an enormously powerful event that disrupts normal development."

Ross never married and left no children. He is remembered as a "true genius, a sweet, likable, and generous man."
