= Tupla tai kuitti =

Finnish game show

Tupla tai kuitti (in English Double or Chit) is a Finnish game show in 1958–1988 and 2007–2008. It was based on The $64,000 Question and is the longest running game show in Finland. It was hosted by Kirsti Rautiainen in 1958–1988 and Kirsi Salo in 2007–2008.
