= Take It or Leave It (radio show) =

American radio quiz show from 1940 to 1947

- Other names: The $64 Question
- Country of origin: United States
- Language: English
- Syndicates: CBS Radio (April 21, 1940-July 27, 1947); NBC Radio Network (August 3, 1947-June 1, 1952)
- Original release: April 21, 1940 – June 1, 1952

Take It or Leave It is a radio quiz show, which ran from April 21, 1940, to July 27, 1947, on CBS. It switched to NBC radio in 1947, and on September 10, 1950, the name of the program was changed to The $64 Question.

The program was initially sponsored by Eversharp. RCA became the sponsor in 1950 and changed the name because of the previous name's association with Eversharp.

== Gameplay ==
Contestants selected from the audience were asked questions. After answering a question correctly, the contestant had the choice to "take" the prize for that question or "leave it" in favor of a chance at the next question. The first question was worth $1, and the value doubled for each successive question, up to the seventh and final question worth $64.

== Cultural influence ==
During the 1940s, "That's the $64 question" became a common catchphrase for a particularly difficult question or problem. In addition to the common phrase "Take it or leave it", the show also popularized another phrase, widely spoken in the 1940s as a taunt but now mostly forgotten (except in Warner Bros. cartoons). Chanted in unison by the entire audience when someone chose to risk their winnings by going for the $64 prize, it was vocalized with a rising inflection: "You'll be sorry!"

The popularity of the radio program inspired a 1944 20th Century Fox feature film, Take It or Leave It, about a man who needs $1,000 to pay his wife's obstetrician. When he is chosen as a contestant on the radio quiz show, the prize money is increased beyond the usual $64.

The program was the basis for the later television program, The $64,000 Question.

In the summer of 1943, the show's audience was estimated at 23 million, making it the highest-rated quiz program on radio. Take It or Leave It was inducted into the National Radio Hall of Fame in 1990.

== Personnel ==
The CBS radio version of the show was first hosted by Bob Hawk (1940–41), followed by Phil Baker (1941–47).In 1947, the series switched to NBC, hosted at various times by Baker, Garry Moore (1947–49), Eddie Cantor (1949–50) and Jack Paar (beginning June 11, 1950). Paar continued as host through the change of the series name to The $64 Question, and was followed by Baker (March–December 1951) and Paar (back in December 1951).

David Ross was the announcer, and Ray Block was in charge of the music.

== Broadcast history ==
- Take It or Leave It – CBS Radio; April 21, 1940 – July 27, 1947; Sunday 10:00 p.m.
- Take It or Leave It - NBC - 1949; Sunday 10:00 p.m.
- The $64 Question – NBC Radio Network; September 10, 1950 – June 1, 1952; Sunday 10:00 p.m. (1950–51) and Sunday 9:30 p.m. (1951–52).

Only five recordings of the program are known to survive.

== See also ==
- The $64,000 Question
