= Lascia o raddoppia? =

Italian game show

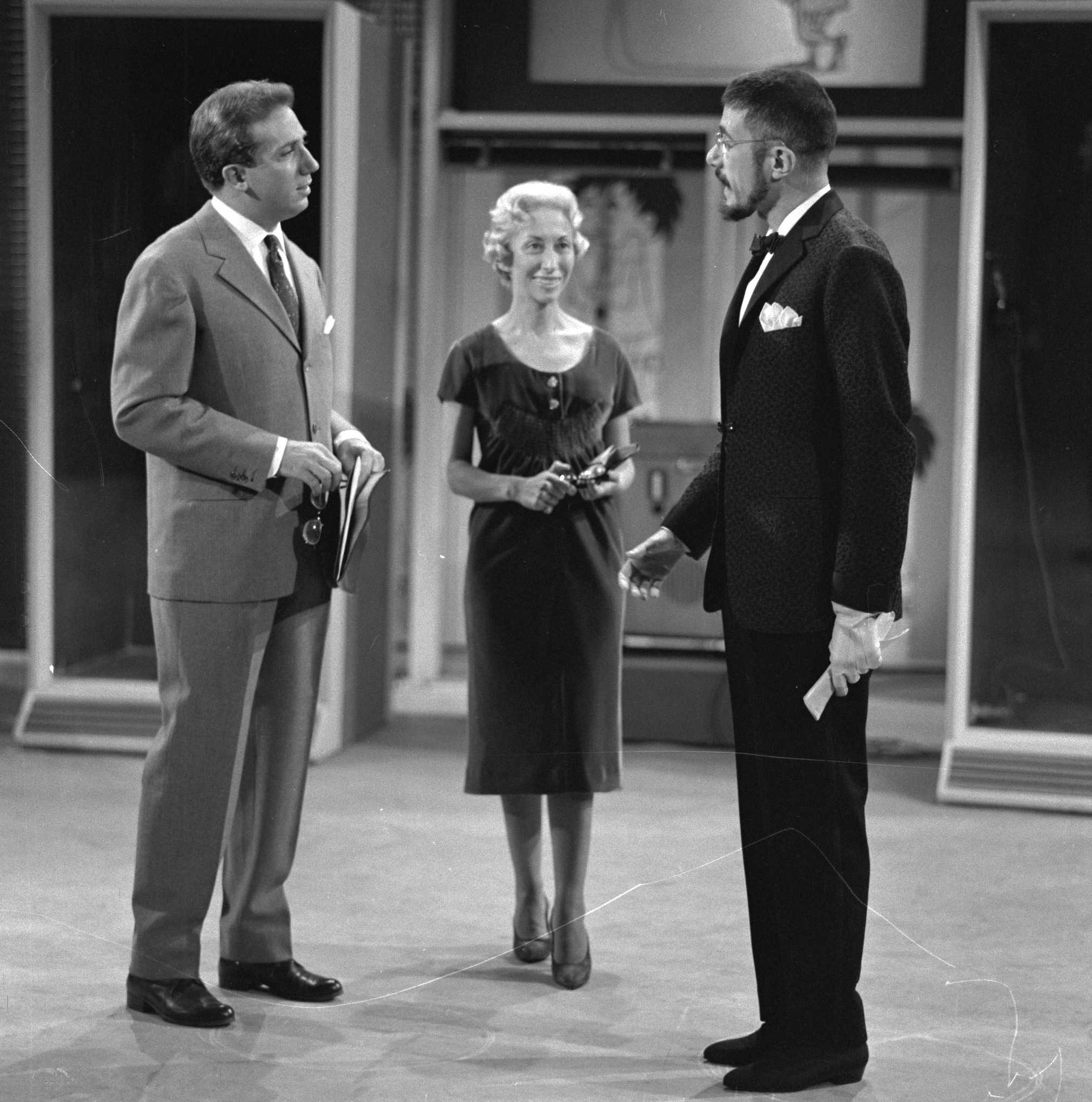
Mike Bongiorno, Edy Campagnoli and Gianluigi Marianini

Lascia o raddoppia? (Italian pronunciation: [ˈlaʃʃa o rradˈdoppja]; "Leave it or double it?") is a game show that aired on Italian television from 1955 to 1959, considered the Italian version of The $64,000 Question. It was hosted by Mike Bongiorno with Edy Campagnoli as valletta (assistant).

Contestants were asked a series of questions on a particular subject that, if answered correctly, would advance them to a prize of Lit. 2,560,000 (about US$4,000 in 1959). The contestant could then stop and walk away with that amount or take a chance on another question with the possibility of doubling their winnings to Lit. 5,120,000 (just over US$8,000 in 1959).

== Controversies ==
Since the programme aired on state-run RAI, the prize money came from the State treasury, making programme officials particularly sensitive to viewer reaction.

Contestants became overnight celebrities and received a high amount of coverage in the Italian press. Most received an average of 2,000 letters each week they were on the show.

Maria Luisa Garoppo, a 23-year-old contestant from North Italy who was quite knowledgeable about Greek drama, scandalized many newspaper editors by wearing a tight red dress that accentuated her 45-inch bust and 19-inch waistline. Garoppo responded to her fashion critics by saying "It's not my fault if God constructed me unlike a telephone pole". The programme coordinator subsequently paid her the prize money but removed her as a contestant, telling viewers she was "under doctor's care for emotional shock".

Paola Bolognani, an 18-year-old philosophy student, was known as "the Marilyn Monroe of Italian soccer" for her knowledge of the game. While she was a contestant, her photo appeared on 22 magazine covers and she received more than 20,000 letters, including 3,500 that were marriage proposals. Bolognani eventually won the top prize by tackling a tough three-part question on soccer, but while she was a contestant a newspaper published an article revealing that she had been an illegitimate child.

== Famous fans of the program ==
Pope Pius XII was known to be a great fan of Lascia o raddoppia?.

Exiled Egyptian King Farouk gave $4,000 to Marisa Zocchi, a 19-year-old contestant who said she would use her winnings to hire a full-time nurse for her sick mother. Zocchi, who had held the title of Miss Tuscany in 1954, had stopped at the $4,000 prize level, sobbing as she explained to viewers she wouldn't risk trying for the full prize for her mother's sake.
