= Mike Bongiorno =

Italian American television host (1924–2009)

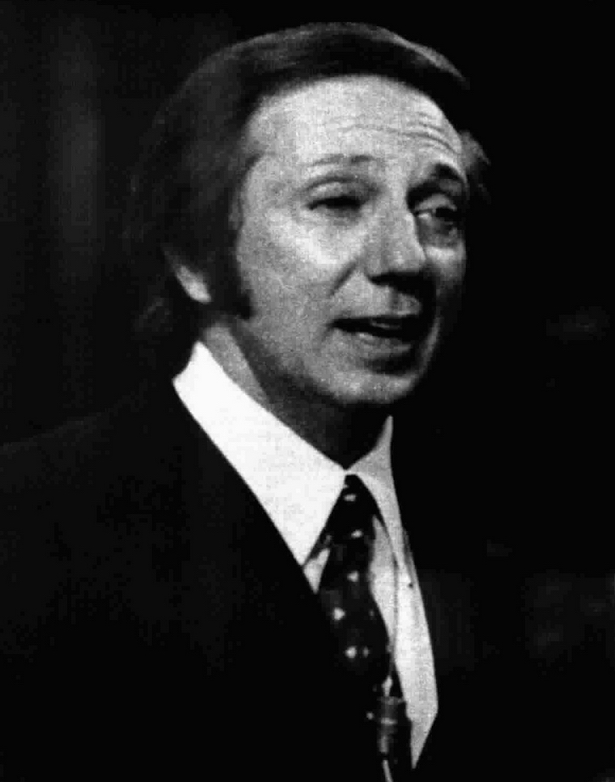
- Mike Bongiorno in 1972
- Born: Michael Nicholas Salvatore Bongiorno; May 26, 1924; New York City, U.S.
- Died: September 8, 2009 (aged 85); Monte Carlo, Monaco
- Occupation: Presenter
- Years active: 1946–2009
- Spouses: Rosalia Maresca (m. 1948; div. 1952) Annarita Torsello (m. 1968; div. 1970) Daniela Zuccoli (m. 1972)
- Children: 3

Michael Nicholas Salvatore Bongiorno (Italian: [bonˈdʒorno, ˌbɔn-]; May 26, 1924 – September 8, 2009) was an American Italian television presenter. After a few experiences in the U.S., he started working on RAI in the 1950s and was considered to be the most popular host in Italy. He was also known by the nickname il Re del Quiz ('The Quiz King'), and the peculiarity of starting all his shows with his trademark greeting: Allegria! ('Cheers!', 'Joy!').

== Early years ==
Bongiorno was born in New York City to parents of Italian descent. He moved to Turin (his mother's native city), when he was young. His father was a Sicilian-American lawyer. During World War II, he abandoned his studies and joined a group of Italian partisans. He was captured and spent seven months in the San Vittore Prison in Milan and was then deported to a German concentration camp. He was liberated before the end of the war due to an exchange of war prisoners between the United States and Germany. He returned to New York and in 1946 started work at the radio headquarters of Il Progresso Italo-Americano ("The Italian American Progress") newspaper.

== Career ==
Bongiorno returned to Italy in 1953. He appeared on the first day of official public TV transmissions in Italy with Arrivi e partenze ('Arrivals and Departures') on the TV channel RAI. From 1955 to 1959, he hosted the quiz show Lascia o raddoppia? ('Leave it or double it?'), the Italian version of U.S.'s The $64,000 Question. Another program was Campanile Sera ('Bell Tower Evening', 1959–1962), in which southern and northern Italian towns challenged each other with questions, and practical games played by citizens in the same towns.

In 1963, Umberto Eco wrote an essay entitled Phenomenology of Mike Bongiorno, a bestseller in which he used advanced academic theories to shed light on Mike Bongiorno and his way of communicating. Eco held that Bongiorno was so good at portraying himself as no better than average in every respect that 100% of his audience could feel good about themselves.

Beginning in 1963, he hosted the first of eleven editions of the Sanremo Music Festival. Then he hosted the quiz programs Caccia al numero ('Number Hunt', 1962), La Fiera dei Sogni ('Dream Fair', 1962–1965) and Giochi in Famiglia ('Games in Family', 1966–1969). But the greatest success came with the quiz program Rischiatutto ('Risk-it-all', 1970–1974), an adapted Italian version of Jeopardy!, with 20 to 30 million watchers every Thursday night, the highest audience in the history of Italian TV. Other programs hosted by Bongiorno were the news talk show Ieri e Oggi ('Yesterday and Today', 1976) and the quiz programs Scommettiamo? (Wanna Bet?, 1976–1978), inspired by horse-racing, and a remake of Lascia o raddoppia? in 1979.

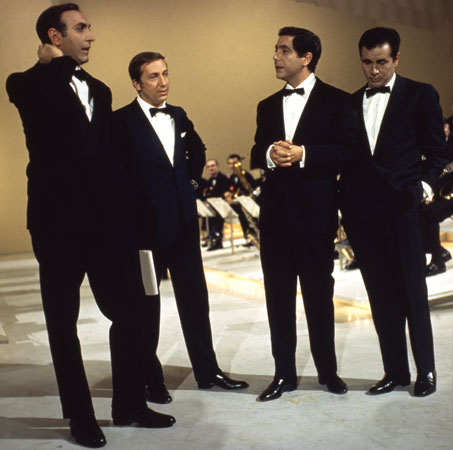
Bongiorno with Pippo Baudo, Corrado Mantoni, and Enzo Tortora

Bongiorno moved to Tele Milano (now Canale 5), one of the first Italian commercial TV channels owned by Mediaset, the media company founded by Silvio Berlusconi, to host I sogni nel cassetto ('The dreams in the drawer', 1979–1980). After a brief return to RAI with the news-game Flash (1980–1982), he continued working for Mediaset quiz programmes Bis (Concentration) (1981–1990), Superflash (1982–1985), Pentatlon (1985–1987), Telemike (1987–1992), Tris (1990–1991), the math game Tutti per uno (Family Feud, 1992) and from 1989 to 2003 La ruota della fortuna (Wheel of Fortune).

From 1991 to 2001, Bongiorno hosted Bravo, Bravissimo, a festival featuring preteen musicians, dancers and singers from all over the world. He won 24 Telegatto, the Italian TV prize. Until 2005, he hosted Genius on Rete 4, an afternoon quiz show aimed at 12- to 14-year-olds. In 2006 and 2007 he hosted his last quiz show Il Migliore (Britain's Brainiest Kid) on Rete 4. He was also a guest on the second episode of the Gianfranco Funari's show Apocalypse Show on Rai 1. On December 13, 2007, Bongiorno was awarded an honorary degree Honoris Causa by IULM University of Milan. On March 26, 2009, Bongiorno signed for Sky Italia after Mediaset decided not to renew his contract, where he planned to host a new game show on Sky Uno called RiSKYtutto (a modern edition of his popular show Rischiatutto), which had been scheduled to air in the autumn of 2009.

== Death ==
On September 8, 2009, at the age of 85, Bongiorno died of a heart attack, while leaving the Hotel Metropole, Monte Carlo, after a short holiday with his wife Daniela Zuccoli. His body lay in repose for a few days at the Triennale in Milan before a state funeral was held in the Milan Cathedral on September 12, 2009. Many Italian TV stars such as Rosario Fiorello, Pippo Baudo, Fabio Fazio, Sandra Mondaini, Alba Parietti, Paola Barale, Carlo Conti, Gerry Scotti, Marco Columbro and several other entertainers attended the service which was held by Bishop Erminio De Scalzi.

Bongiorno was buried in the family tomb, at Dagnente Cemetery, near Arona, Piedmont. On January 25, 2011, the tomb was ransacked and his body, along with the coffin, was stolen. On December 8, 2011, Bongiorno's body was recovered from a field near Milan.

== Acting roles ==
Year	Title	Role
1955	Motivo in maschera	Mike
1955	Girls of Today	Sandro
1955	Il prezzo della gloria	Ruggero Grimaldi
1956	Totò lascia o raddoppia?	Himself
1956	I miliardari	Marco
1961	The Last Judgment	Himself
1968	Il cenerentolo	TV Presenter
1972	Life Is Tough, Eh Providence?	Mike Goodmorning
1974	We All Loved Each Other So Much	Himself
1982	Sogni mostruosamente proibiti	Himself
2000	20 - Venti	Himself

== Honours and awards ==
=== Honours ===
In 1996, Bongiorno was made a Commander of the Order of Saints Maurice and Lazarus by Vittorio Emanuele, Prince of Naples, the last crown prince of the former Kingdom of Italy, and Head of the House of Savoy.

On May 26, 2004, on occasion of his 80th birthday, Bongiorno was appointed a Grand Officer of the Order of Merit of the Italian Republic by the then Italian President Carlo Azeglio Ciampi.

=== Honorary degree ===
In the autumn of 2007, Bongiorno received an honorary degree in Television, Film and Multimedia production from the IULM University of Milan.

=== Awards ===
- 1984 Telegatto – Best TV quiz, for presenting television quiz Superflash on Canale 5
- 1985 Telegatto – Best TV quiz, for presenting television quiz Superflash on Canale 5
- 1986 Telegatto – Best TV quiz, for presenting television quiz Superflash on Canale 5
- 1987 Telegatto – Best TV quiz, for presenting television game show Pentathlon on Canale 5
- 1988 Telegatto – Best TV quiz, for presenting television game quiz Telemike on Canale 5
- 1989 Telegatto – Best TV quiz, for presenting television game quiz Telemike on Canale 5
- 1990 Telegatto – Best TV quiz, for presenting television game quiz Telemike on Canale 5
- 1991 Telegatto – Best TV quiz, for presenting television game quiz Telemike on Canale 5
- 1992 Telegatto – Best quiz and game shows, presenting La ruota della fortuna, the Italian version of Wheel of Fortune
- 1993 Telegatto – Best quiz and game shows, presenting La Ruota Della Fortuna, the Italian version of Wheel of Fortune
- 1994 Telegatto –Best quiz and game shows, presenting La Ruota Della Fortuna, the Italian version of Wheel of Fortune
- 1995 Telegatto – Best quiz and game shows, presenting La Ruota Della Fortuna, the Italian version of Wheel of Fortune
- 1996 Telegatto platinum, for a lifelong career (for the 50-year career in television)
- 1997 Telegatto – Best Music Program, for hosting Festival della canzone italiana
- 2003 Telegatto – What's on TV, for hosting Grand Prix International TV
- 2006 Telegatto platinum, for a lifelong career
- 2008 Premio Club Santa Chiara, for a lifelong career
- 2011 Premio America of the Italy–USA Foundation in memory
