= Down You Go =

American TV game series (1951–1956)

- Created by: Polly Cowan
- Presented by: Bergen Evans; Bill Cullen
- Country of origin: United States
- Original language: English

Production
- Camera setup: Multi-camera
- Running time: 24–26 minutes

Original release
- Network: DuMont (1951–1955); CBS (1955); ABC (1955–1956); NBC (1956)
- Release: May 30, 1951 – September 8, 1956

Down You Go is an American television game show originally broadcast on the DuMont Television Network. The Emmy Award-nominated series ran from 1951 to 1956 as a prime time series primarily hosted by Dr. Bergen Evans. The program aired in eleven different timeslots during its five-year run.

Down You Go is one of only six series — along with The Arthur Murray Party, Pantomime Quiz, Tom Corbett, Space Cadet, The Ernie Kovacs Show, and The Original Amateur Hour — shown on all four major television networks of the Golden Age of Television (ABC, NBC, CBS, and DuMont).

== Gameplay ==
Down You Go was similar to "Hangman", with a group of four celebrity panelists who were asked to guess a word or phrase submitted by a home viewer. The host would give a wordplay-laden clue to the panel, who could then ask a question of any sort about the phrase, for which the host would have to ad lib an answer. After two questions, the second panelist would begin calling out a letter. Guessing a letter in the puzzle kept the panelist alive; if the panelist guessed a letter not in the puzzle, they would be eliminated and would pull down a lever on their lectern replacing their name with the phrase "DOWN YOU GO." Once two of the four panelists went down, the remaining panelists could ask another clue. At any time, a panelist could solve the puzzle and, if correct, end the game. The panel and host would then lightheartedly discuss the phrase for a minute or so before the next round began.

Home viewers received a $5 wire transfer and an encyclopedia set valued at $25 if their puzzle was used on-air, plus an additional $50 bonus if the puzzle was sent in along with a boxtop from one of the show's presenting sponsors and an additional $5 for each panelist they eliminated.

Among the regular panelists were comedian Fran Allison, journalist Phyllis Cerf, editor Francis Coughlin, actress Patricia Cutts, actress Carmelita Pope, actor Boris Karloff, author Jean Kerr, and athlete Phil Rizzuto.

== Broadcast history ==
On DuMont:

- The series debuted on May 30, 1951, on DuMont, airing on Wednesday nights from 9 to 9:30pm ET until July, when it moved to Thursdays.
- The program was moved to Friday at the start of the 1951–1952 television season.
- During the summer of 1952, it aired on Fridays at 8pm ET.
- In October 1952, it would be moved back to a 10:30pm time slot.
- The series was shuffled around DuMont's schedule (Wednesdays at 9:30pm, then 10pm, and finally Fridays at 10:30pm) until May 20, 1955.

Down You Go has been described as "one of the wittiest, most intelligent panel shows on television". The popular series was nominated for a "Best Audience Participation, Quiz, or Panel Program" Emmy in 1953.

After Western Union canceled Down You Go on DuMont, the show moved to CBS as the summer replacement for My Favorite Husband in 1955. Whitehall Pharmacal and Procter & Gamble were alternate sponsors. Host Bergen Evans and some of the panelists stayed for the new version, which aired from June 11 to September 3. After twelve days, Down You Go returned to network television, this time on ABC, where it aired until June 4, 1956.

NBC picked up the program on June 16 and made Down You Go more comedy-oriented, with new host Bill Cullen and a regular celebrity panel of Jayne Mansfield, Jimmy Nelson, Hildy Parks, and Arthur Treacher. The series ended on September 8, 1956.

== British version ==
The BBC aired their own version from January 1, 1953, to 1954. Originally hosted by Marcus Dick, Roy Rich took over the position beginning in April 1953, coinciding with a "refreshing" of the programme. Notably, Evans-era regular Patricia Cutts was a regular on this version as well.

== Episode status ==
One episode is known to exist. The panel for the episode was Francis Coughlin, Patricia Cutts, Jerome Weidman, and Laraine Day. The only indication of the date of the program was a brief and unusual promo advising viewers to tune in "on another network" to watch The Loretta Young Show the following night; as that show was only known by that name after 1954 and aired on Sunday nights, the promo sets this episode of Down You Go during the summer 1955 run on CBS, the only time the show ran on Saturdays. This episode is held by the Museum of Broadcast Communications in Chicago, circulates among collectors, and is available for viewing at the Internet Archive (albeit mistakenly dated September 26, 1951).

No episodes are known to have survived of the British version.

== See also ==
- List of programs broadcast by the DuMont Television Network
- List of surviving DuMont Television Network broadcasts

== Bibliography ==
- David Weinstein, The Forgotten Network: DuMont and the Birth of American Television (Philadelphia: Temple University Press, 2004) ISBN 1-59213-245-6
- Alex McNeil, Total Television, Fourth edition (New York: Penguin Books, 1980) ISBN 0-14-024916-8
- Tim Brooks and Earle Marsh, The Complete Directory to Prime Time Network TV Shows, Ninth edition (New York: Ballantine Books, 2007) ISBN 978-0-345-49773-4
